= List of indoor arenas =

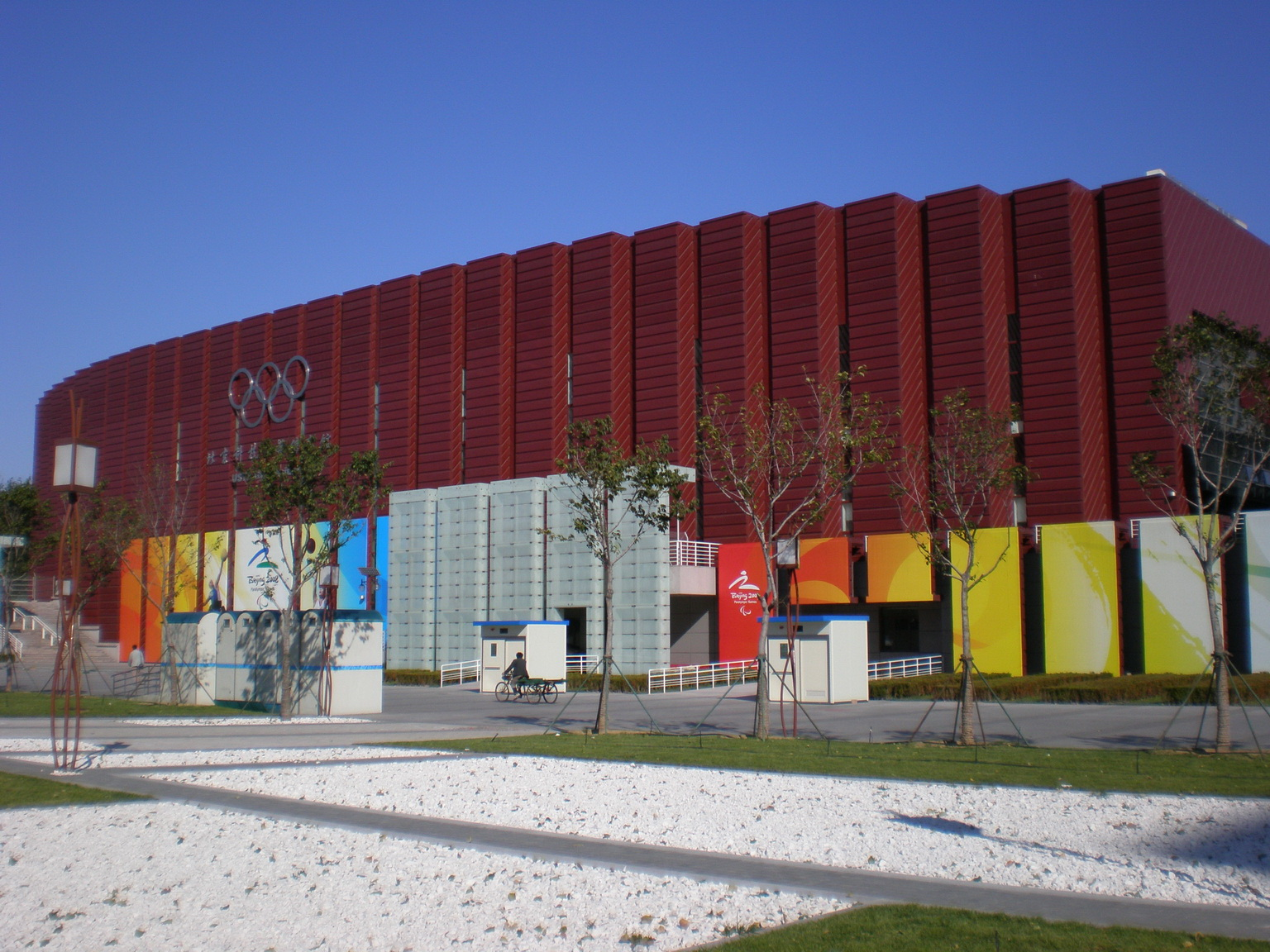
Beijing Science and Technology University Gymnasium

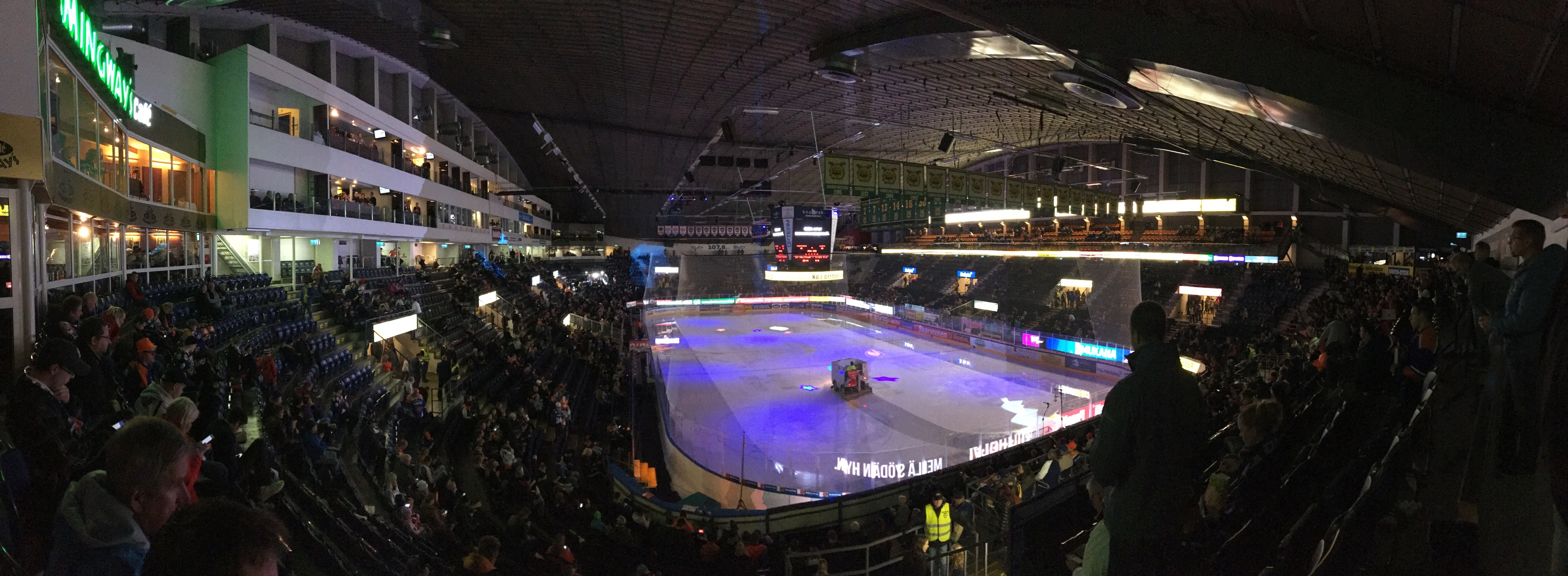
Tampere Ice Stadium

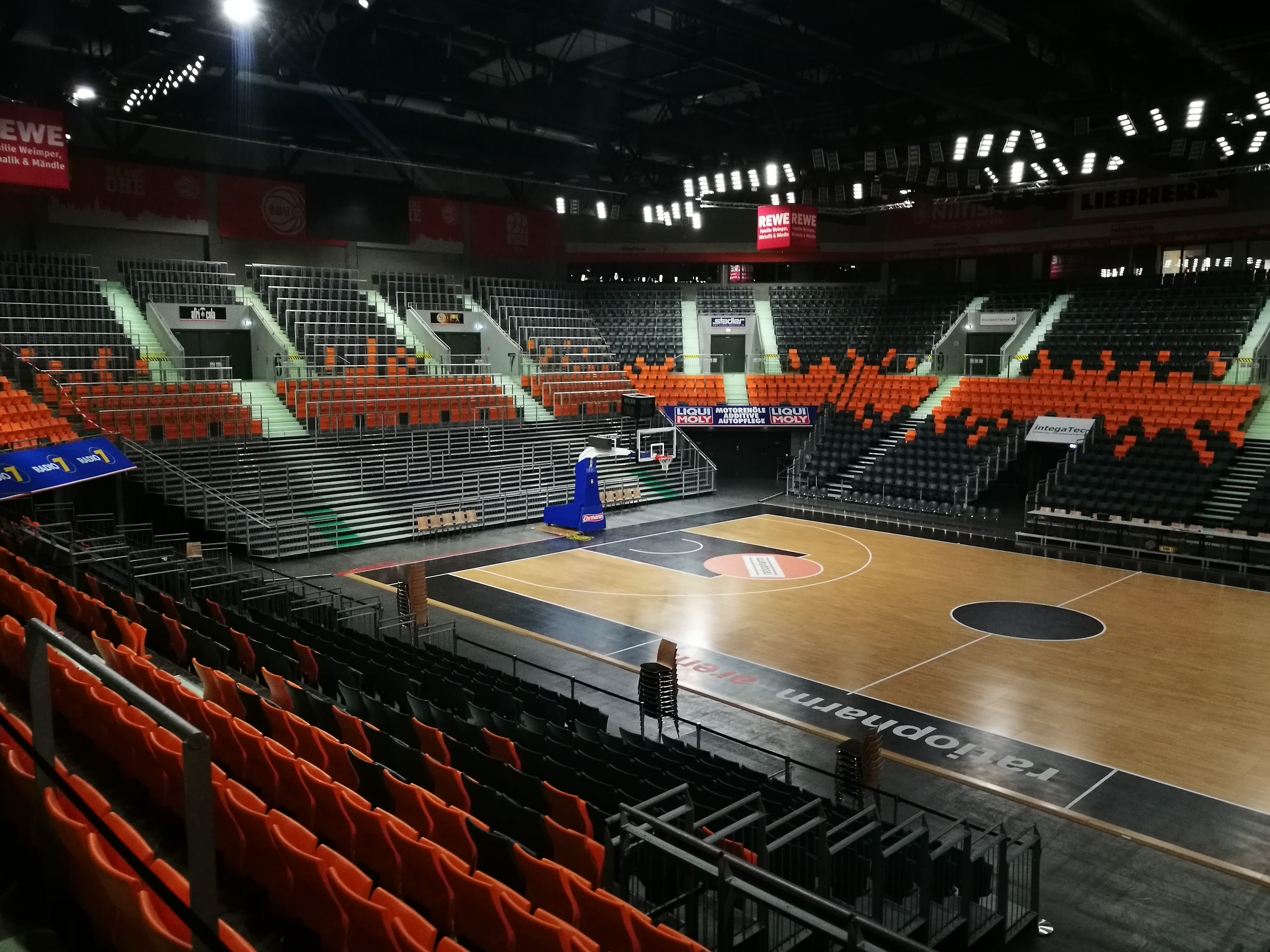
Ratiopharm Arena

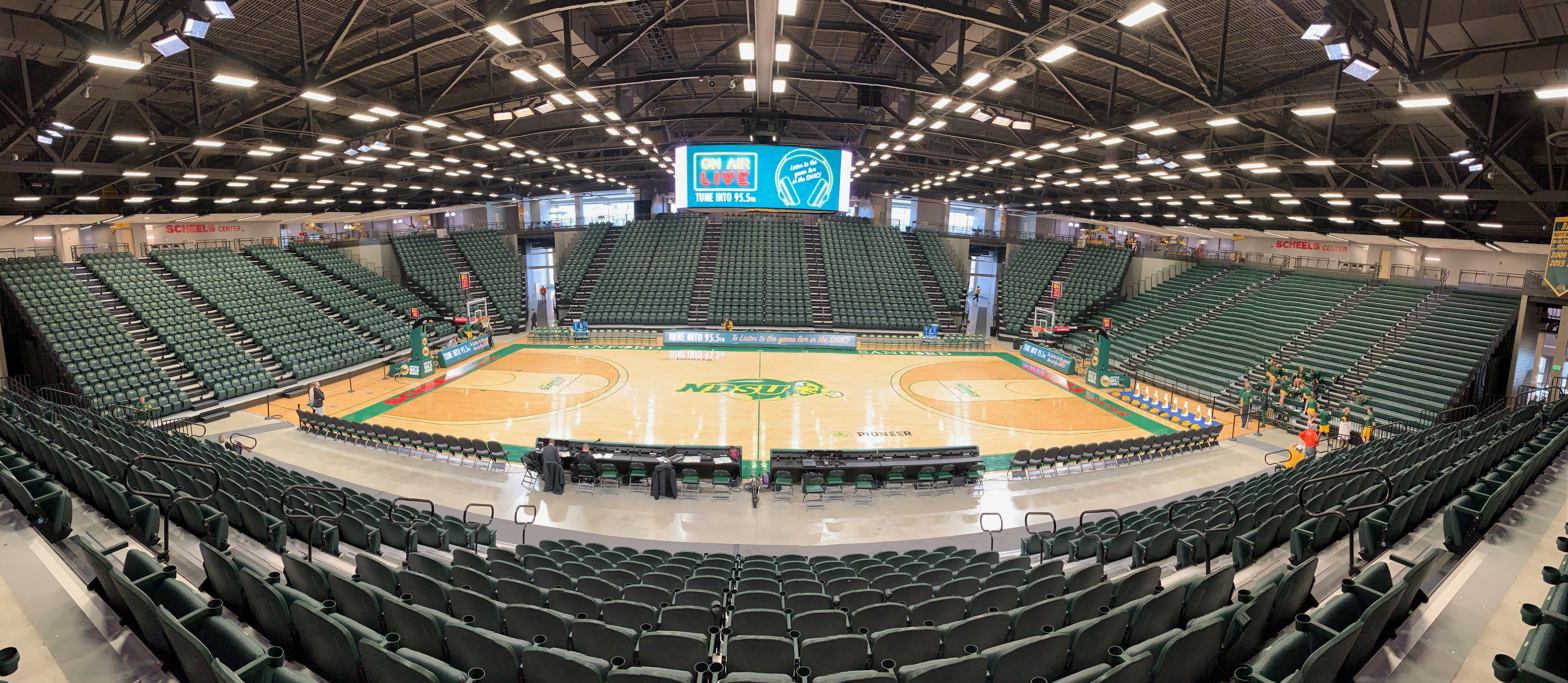
Scheels Center

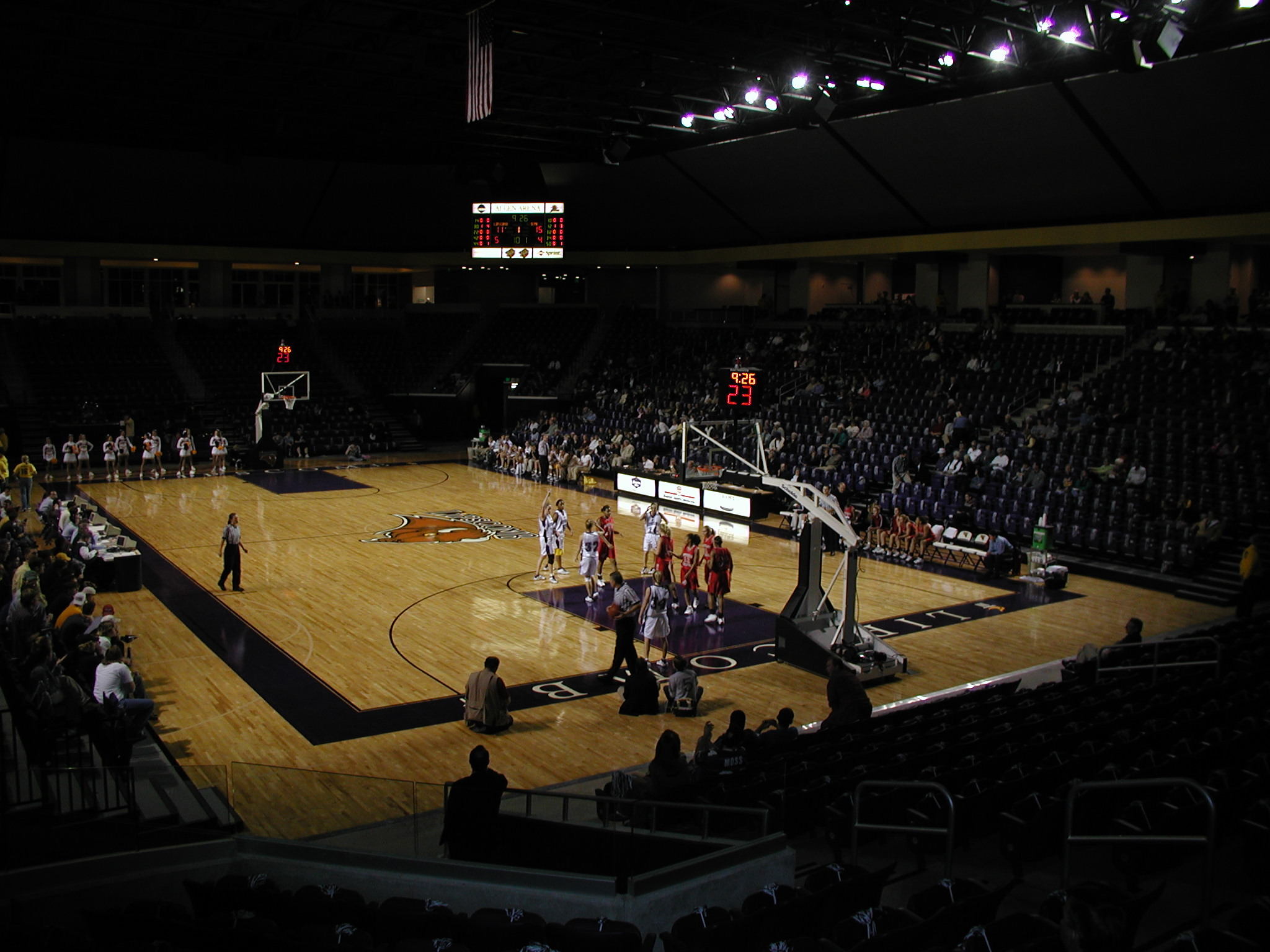
Allen Arena

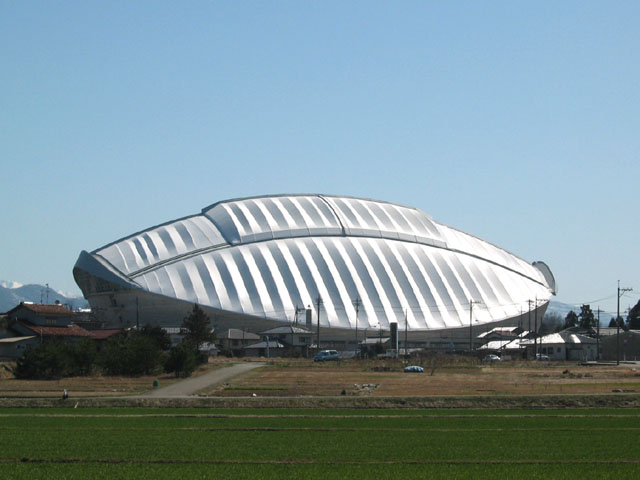
Komatsu Dome

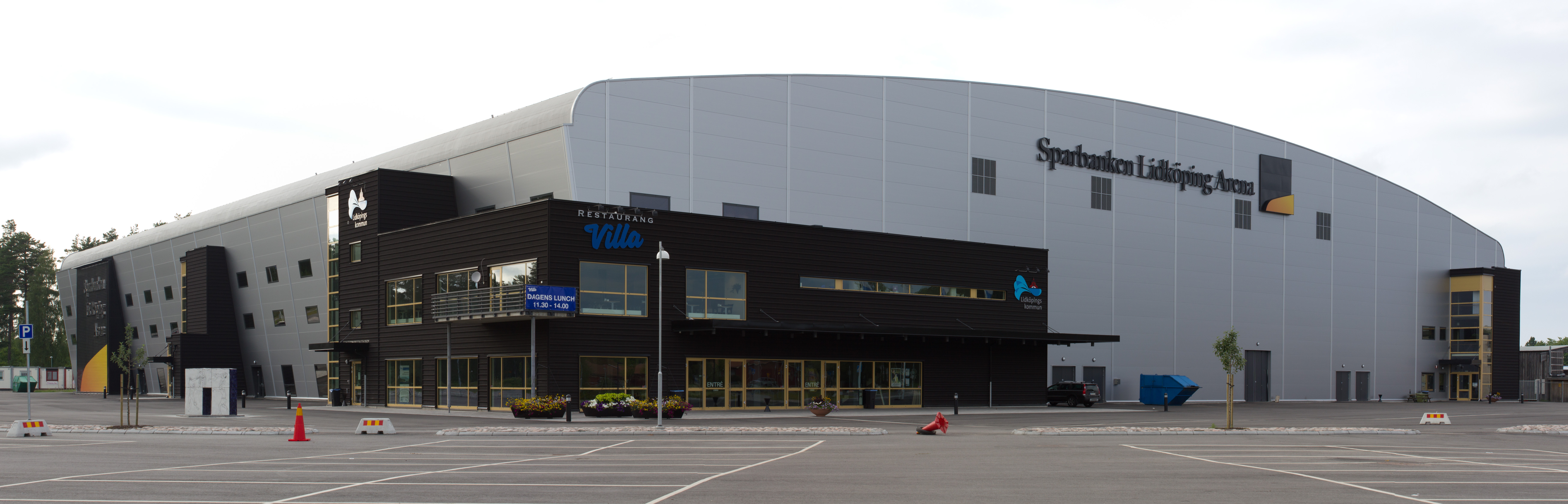
Sparbanken Lidköping Arena

Indoor arenas with a capacity of 1,000 or higher include the following:

== Africa ==
| Country | Location | Arena | Date built | Capacity | Tenant/use |
|---|---|---|---|---|---|
| Algeria | Algiers | Coupole Mohamed Boudiaf | | 15,000 | |
| Algeria | Algiers | La Coupole d’Alger Arena | 1975 | 5,500 | 2004 Pan Arab Games |
| Algeria | Algiers | Salle Hacène Harcha | | 8,000 | GS Pétroliers, 2004 Pan Arab Games, 2005 FIBA Africa Championship |
| Algeria | Oran | Palais des Sports Hamou Boutlélis | 1960 | 5,000 | MC Oran, 1988 African Handball Cup Winners' Cup |
| Angola | Luanda | Pavilhão Anexo | | 1,500 | |
| Angola | Luanda | Pavilhão Anexo II | | 1,500 | |
| Angola | Luanda | Pavilhão da Cidadela | | 6,873 | Petro de Luanda |
| Angola | Luanda | Pavilhão Dream Space | | 2,500 | Recreativo do Libolo |
| Angola | Luanda | Pavilhão Multiusos do Kilamba | 2013 | 12,720 | 2013 Roller Hockey World Championship |
| Angola | Luanda | Pavilhão Victorino Cunha | | 1,500 | 2013 Angola Roller Hockey President's Cup |
| Angola | Benguela | Pavilhão Acácias Rubras | 2007 | 2,100 | 2007 Afrobasket |
| Angola | Cabinda | Pavilhão do Tafe | 2007 | 2,000 | 2007 Afrobasket |
| Angola | Huambo | Pavilhão Serra Van-Dúnem | 2007 | 2,010 | 2007 Afrobasket |
| Angola | Lubango | Pavilhão Nossa Senhora do Monte | 2007 | 2,000 | 2007 Afrobasket |
| Angola | Malanje | Pavilhão Palanca Negra Gigante | 2013 | 3,000 | 2013 Angola Roller Hockey President's Cup |
| Angola | Moçâmedes | Pavilhão Welwitschia Mirabilis | 2013 | 3,072 | 2013 World Roller Hockey World Championship |
| Cameroon | Yaoundé | Yaoundé Multipurpose Sports Complex | 2008 | 5,263 | |
| Congo | Brazzaville | Palais des Sports Kintélé | | 10,134 | 2015 African Games |
| Côte d'Ivoire | Abidjan | Palais des Sports de Treichville | | 3,500 | |
| Egypt | Cairo | Al Ahly Sports Hall | 1991 | 2,500 | Al Ahly SC |
| Egypt | Cairo | The Covered Hall | | 20,000 | 1991 All-Africa Games |
| Egypt | Port Said | Port Said Hall | | 5,000 | 1999 World Men's Handball Championship |
| Gabon | Libreville | Le Palais des Sports de Libreville | 2018 | 6,000 | 2018 African Men's Handball Championship |
| Kenya | Nairobi | Kasarani Indoor Arena | | 5,000 | |
| Libya | Benghazi | Suliman Ad-Dharrath Arena | 1967 | 10,000 | |
| Mali | Bamako | Pavillon des sports Modibo Keita | | 3,000 | 2009 Mali Handball Cup |
| Morocco (list) | Agadir | Salle Al Inbiâate | | 4,000 | |
| Morocco (list) | Casablanca | Salle Mohammed V | | 12,000 | |
| Morocco (list) | El Jadida | Salle Najib Naâmi | | 1,000 | |
| Morocco (list) | Fez | Salle 11th November | | 3,000 | |
| Morocco (list) | Kenitra | Salle Al Wahda | | 2,500 | |
| Morocco (list) | Nador | Salle Omnisports Zaio | | 1,000 | |
| Morocco (list) | Nador | Salle Omnisports Nador | | 4,000 | |
| Morocco (list) | Rabat | Salle Moulay Abdellah | | 10,000 | |
| Morocco (list) | Rabat | Salle Ibn Yassine | | 5,000 | |
| Morocco (list) | Salé | Salle El Bouâzzaoui | | 2,000 | |
| Morocco (list) | Tangier | Salle Badr | | 1,500 | |
| Morocco (list) | Tetouan | Salle Omnisports Tetouan | | 4,000 | |
| Nigeria | Abuja | Abuja Sports Hall | | 3,000 | |
| South Africa | Cape Town | International Convention Centre | 2003 | | 2023 Netball World Cup |
| South Africa | Cape Town | Techtronic Velodrome | 1997 | 7,800 | 1999 World Cycling Federation Championships |
| South Africa | Durban | Inkosi Albert Luthuli International Convention Centre | 1994 | 10,000 | Commonwealth Heads of Government Meeting 1999 |
| South Africa | Johannesburg | Ticketpro Dome | 1997 | 20,000 | NBA Africa Game 2017 |
| South Africa | Johannesburg | Ellis Park Arena | 1990 | 6,300 | NBA Africa Game 2015 |
| South Africa | Pretoria | Heartfelt Arena | 2023 | 3,000 | Men's and Women's FIH Indoor Hockey World Cup |
| South Africa | Pretoria | Sun Arena Time Square | 2017 | 10,500 | |
| Tunisia | Hammamet | Salle d'Hammamet | | 2,500 | |
| Tunisia | Nabeul | Salle Bir Challouf | | 5,000 | |
| Tunisia | Radès | Salle Omnisport de Rades | 2004 | 17,000 | 2005 World Men's Handball Championship, AfroBasket 2015, AfroBasket 2017 |
| Tunisia | Tunis | Salle El Menzah | 1967 | 5,500 | 2005 World Men's Handball Championship, 2014 FIVB Volleyball World League |

== Asia ==
| Country | Location | Arena | Date built | Capacity | Tenant/use |
|---|---|---|---|---|---|
| China (list) | Beijing | Capital Indoor Stadium | 1968 | 17,345 | 2008 Summer Olympics |
| China (list) | Beijing | Beihang University Gymnasium | 2001 | 5,400 | 2008 Summer Olympics, 2008 Summer Paralympics |
| China (list) | Beijing | Beijing Institute of Technology Gymnasium | 2008 | 5,000 | Volleyball: 2008 Summer Olympics; Goalball: 2008 Summer Paralympics |
| China (list) | Beijing | Beijing National Indoor Stadium | 2007 | 18,000 | |
| China (list) | Beijing | Beijing Science and Technology University Gymnasium | 2007 | 8,024 | Judo, Tae Kwon Do: 2008 Summer Olympics; Basketball, Rugby: 2008 Summer Paralympics |
| China (list) | Beijing | Beijing University of Technology Gymnasium | 2007 | 7,500 | Badminton, Rhythmic Gymnastics: 2008 Summer Olympics |
| China (list) | Beijing | Cadillac Arena | 2008 | 18,000 | Hosted several matches of the 2019 FIBA Basketball World Cup, including the bronze medal game and final |
| China (list) | Beijing | China Agricultural University Gymnasium | 2007 | 6,000 | Wrestling: 2008 Summer Olympics |
| China (list) | Beijing | Olympic Sports Center Gymnasium | | 7,000 | |
| China (list) | Beijing | Peking University Gymnasium | 2008 | 8,000 | |
| China (list) | Beijing | Shougang Gymnasium | 2002 | 6,000 | |
| China (list) | Beijing | Workers Indoor Arena | 1961 | 13,000 | |
| China (list) | Changchun | Changchun Gymnasium | 1957 | 4,299 | |
| China (list) | Changchun | Changchun Wuhuan Gymnasium | 1984 | 11,428 | |
| China (list) | Changzhou | Xincheng Gymnasium | 2008 | 6,200 | |
| China (list) | Dalian | Damai Center | 2013 | 18,000 | 2013 National Games of China |
| China (list) | Dongguan | Dalang Arena | 1994 | 4,000 | Shenzhen Leopards (CBA) |
| China (list) | Dongguan | Dongguan Arena | 1994 | 4,000 | Guangdong Southern Tigers (CBA) |
| China (list) | Dongguan | Nissan Sports Center | 2014 | 14,730 | Several matches of the 2019 FIBA Basketball World Cup, including the quarterfinal matches |
| China (list) | Foshan | Foshan Lingnan Mingzhu Gymnasium | 2006 | 8,324 | Foshan Dralions (CBA) |
| China (list) | Guangzhou | Guangzhou Gymnasium | 2001 | 10,000 | 9th National Games of the PRC; 2010 Asian Games |
| China (list) | Guangzhou | Guangzhou International Sports Arena | 2010 | 18,000 | 2010 Asian Games |
| China (list) | Guangzhou | Asian Games Town Gymnasium | | 6,233 | 2010 Asian Games |
| China (list) | Guangzhou | Huangpu Sports Centre Gymnasium | | 5,000 | 2010 Asian Games |
| China (list) | Guangzhou | Nansha Gymnasium | | 8,080 | 2010 Asian Games |
| China (list) | Guangzhou | Guangdong Gymnasium | | 2,800 | 2010 Asian Games |
| China (list) | Guangzhou | Tianhe Gymnasium | | 9,000 | 2010 Asian Games |
| China (list) | Guangzhou | Yingdong Gymnasium | | 2,499 | 2010 Asian Games |
| China (list) | Guangzhou | Zengcheng Gymnasium | | 2,300 | 2010 Asian Games |
| China (list) | Hangzhou | Hangzhou Gymnasium | 1966 | 5,136 | |
| China (list) | Harbin | Baqu Arena | | 5,000 | 2008 Women's World Ice Hockey Championships |
| China (list) | Harbin | Harbin International Sports Center Gymnasium | 2004 | 10,603 | |
| China (list) | Jinan | Jinan Olympic Sports Center | 2009 | 12,226 | |
| China (list) | Jinan | Shandong Arena | 1979 | 8,800 | |
| China (list) | Jinjiang | Zuchang Gymnasium | 2002 | 6,000 | |
| China (list) | Nanning | Guangxi Gymnasium | 2012 | 9,247 | |
| China (list) | Nanjing | Nanjing Youth Olympic Sports Park Gymnasium | | 20,000 | 2018 BWF World Championships, 2019 FIBA Basketball World Cup |
| China (list) | Nanjing | Nanjing Olympic Sports Center Gymnasium | | 13,000 | 2009 World Women's Handball Championship |
| China (list) | Nanjing | Nangang Gymnasium | 1995 | 6,000 | |
| China (list) | Nanjing | Wutaishan Gymnasium | 1973 | 10,000 | |
| China (list) | Ningbo | Beilun Gymnasium | | 8,000 | FIVB World Grand Prix |
| China (list) | Ningbo | Youngor Arena | 1994 | 5,000 | |
| China (list) | Qingdao | Guoxin Gymnasium | | 12,500 | |
| China (list) | Qingdao | Quingdao University Gymnasium | 2005 | 6,000 | |
| China (list) | Shanghai | Luwan Gymnasium | | 3,000 | |
| China (list) | Shanghai | Mercedes-Benz Arena | | 18,000 | Expo 2010 |
| China (list) | Shanghai | Shanghai Oriental Sports Center | | 18,000 | 2011 World Aquatics Championships, Hosted several matches of the 2019 FIBA World Cup |
| China (list) | Shanghai | Qizhong Forest Sports City Arena | | 15,000 | ATP World Tour Masters 1000 |
| China (list) | Shanghai | Shanghai Grand Stage | | 12,000 | |
| China (list) | Shanghai | Shanghai Yuanshen Sports Center | | 5,000 | |
| China (list) | Shanghai | Shanghai International Gymnastic Center | | 4,000 | |
| China (list) | Shanghai | Luwan Indoor Arena | | 3,500 | |
| China (list) | Shanghai | Putuo Indoor Arena | | 3,000 | |
| China (list) | Shenyang | Shenyang Gymnasium | 2007 | 10,000 | |
| China (list) | Shenzhen | Shenzhen Dayun Arena | 2011 | 18,000 | Shenzhen KRS Vanke Rays |
| China (list) | Shenzhen | Shenzhen Bay Gymnasium | 2011 | 12,793 | |
| China (list) | Taiyuan | Riverside Sports Arena | 1998 | 5,331 | |
| China (list) | Tianjin | Tianjin Arena | | 10,000 | |
| China (list) | Ürümqi | Hongshan Arena | 2002 | 3,800 | |
| China (list) | Wuhan | Wuhan Sports Center Gymnasium | | 13,000 | 2013 FIVB World Grand Prix; 2014 FIBA Asia Cup 2019 FIBA Basketball World Cup - Group B (Preliminary round) |
| China (list) | Yingkou | Tiexi Gymnasium | 2008 | 4,500 | |
| China (list) | Yiwu | Yiwu Gymnasium | 2005 | 6,000 | |
| Cambodia | Phnom Penh | Beeline Arena | | 2,500 | |
Hong Kong
| Hong Kong | Kowloon City | Kai Tak Stadium | 2025 | 50,000 | |
| Hong Kong | Kowloon City | Kai Tak Main Arena | 2025 | 10,000 | |
| Hong Kong | Hung Hom | Hong Kong Coliseum | 1983 | 12,500 | 1992 FIFA Futsal World Championship; 2010, 2013, 2014, and 2015 FIVB World Grand Prix; 2009 East Asian Games |
| Hong Kong | Chek Lap Kok | AsiaWorld Arena | 2005 | 12,500 | |
| Hong Kong | Kowloon Bay | Star Hall | 2007 | 3,600 | |
| Hong Kong | Morrison Hill | Queen Elizabeth Stadium | 1980 | 3,500 | 2009 East Asian Games, 2023 Gay Games |
| Hong Kong | Mong Kok | Macpherson Stadium | 2013 | 2,000 | |
| India | Ahmedabad | Mithakhali Multi Sports Complex | 2007 | 7,000 | |
| India | Aizawl | Hawla Indoor Stadium | 2012 | 3,000 | |
| India | Prayagraj | Amitabh Bachchan Sports Complex | | 4,000 | |
| India | Bengaluru | Kanteerava Indoor Stadium | 1995 | 4,000 | |
| India | Bengaluru | Koramangala Indoor Stadium | 1997 | 2,000 | |
| India | Campal | Campal Indoor Complex | 2014 | 3,000 | 2016 National Games of India |
| India | Chennai | Jawaharlal Nehru Indoor Stadium | | 8,000 | |
| India | Cuttack | Jawaharlal Nehru Indoor Stadium | | 6,000 | |
| India | New Delhi | Indira Gandhi Arena | 1982 | 14,348 | 1982 Asian Games, 2010 Commonwealth Games |
| India | New Delhi | Talkatora Stadium | 2010 | 3,035 | 2010 Commonwealth Games |
| India | New Delhi | Thyagaraj Sports Complex | 2010 | 5,694 | |
| India | New Delhi | Yamuna Sports Complex | 1999 | 4,297 | 2010 Commonwealth Games |
| India | Hajipur | Basawan Singh Indoor Stadium | | | |
| India | Hyderabad | Gachibowli Indoor Stadium | 2002 | 5,000 | World Badminton Championships 2009 |
| India | Hyderabad | Kotla Vijay Bhaskar Reddy Indoor Stadium | 2003 | 2,000 | 2003 Afro-Asian Games |
| India | Hyderabad | Saroornagar Indoor Arena | | 2,000 | |
| India | Indore | Abhay Prashal Indoor Stadium | 1994 | 10,000 | |
| India | Jallandhar | Sawai Mansingh Indoor Stadium | 2006 | 2,000 | |
| India | Kochi | Rajiv Gandhi Indoor Stadium | 1993 | 10,000 | |
| India | Kolkata | Netaji Indoor Stadium | 1975 | 12,000 | 1981 Asian Basketball Championship |
| India | Lucknow | Babu Banarasi Das Indoor Stadium | | 5,000 | India Open Grand Prix Gold, Indian Badminton League |
| India | Mumbai | Sadar Patel Indoor Stadium | 1957 | 5,000 | |
| India | Nagpur | Vivekananda Nagar Indoor Sports Complex | 2014 | 5,000 | |
| India | Greater Noida | GBU Indoor Stadium | 2015 | 2,000 | |
| India | Patna | Patliputra Sports Complex | 2011 | 3,500 | Women's World Cup Kabaddi Championship |
| India | Pune | Shree Shiv Chhatrapati Sports Complex | | 3,800 | |
| India | Puttaparthi | Sri Sathya Sai International Centre for Sports | 2006 | 4,000 | |
| India | Raipur | Balbir Singh Juneja Indoor Stadium | | 4,000 | |
| India | Srinagar | University Convocation Complex | 1981 | 2,500 | |
| India | Surat | Pandit Deendayal Upadhyay Indoor Stadium | 1998 | 7,000 | |
| India | Taleigao | Dr Shyama Prasad Mukherjee Indoor Stadium | 2014 | 4,000 | 2014 Lusophony Games |
| India | Tiruchirappalli | Anna Stadium | | 4,000 | |
| India | Thiruvananthapuram | Jimmy George Indoor Stadium | 1987 | 2,000 | |
| India | Thrissur | Triprayar Sports and Games Association Indoor Stadium | 2013 | 4,000 | |
| India | Thrissur | V.K.N. Menon Indoor Stadium | 1987 | 2,000 | |
| India | Visakhapatnam | Port Trust Golden Jubilee Stadium | | 3,000 | |
| India | Yanam | YSR Indoor Stadium | 2010 | 2,000 | |
| Indonesia | Batam | Hi-Test Arena | 2013 | 1,200 | |
| Indonesia | Bandung | C-Tra Arena | 1999 | 5,000 | |
| Indonesia | Bandung | Saparua Sports Hall | | 4,000 | |
| Indonesia | Bogor | Sentul International Convention Center | 2005 | 11,000 | |
| Indonesia | Cirebon | Bima Sports Hall | | | |
| Indonesia | Jakarta | Bulungan Sports Hall | | 900 | 2018 Asian Games |
| Indonesia | Jakarta | Indonesia Arena | 2023 | 16,500 | 2023 FIBA Basketball World Cup |
| Indonesia | Jakarta | Jakarta International Expo | 2010 | 12,000 | |
| Indonesia | Jakarta | Gelora Bung Karno Basketball Hall | 1962 | 2,400 | 1962 Asian Games, 2018 Asian Games, 2018 Asian Para Games |
| Indonesia | Jakarta | Gelora Bung Karno Tennis Indoor Stadium | 1993 | 3,300 | |
| Indonesia | Jakarta | Istora Gelora Bung Karno | 1961 | 7,110 | 1962 Asian Games, 2018 Asian Games, 2018 Asian Para Games |
| Indonesia | Jakarta | Jakarta International Convention Center | 1974 | 5,000 | |
| Indonesia | Jakarta | The BritAma Arena | | 4,000 | |
| Indonesia | Jayapura | Istora Lukas Enembe | 2021 | 3,000 | |
| Indonesia | Jayapura | STT Gidi Sentani | | 3,000 | |
| Indonesia | Mimika | Basket MSCI Hall | 2021 | 3,000 | |
| Indonesia | Palembang | Palembang Sport and Convention Center | 2011 | 4,000 | 2011 Asian Men's Club Volleyball Championship |
| Indonesia | Palembang | Ranau Sports Hall | | 2,000 | |
| Indonesia | Parepare | Gelora B.J. Habibie Sports Hall | | | |
| Indonesia | Semarang | GOR Sahabat | | 1,500 | |
| Indonesia | Surabaya | DBL Arena | 2007 | 4,000 | |
| Indonesia | Surabaya | GOR Kertajaya Surabaya | 1990 | 3,000 | |
| Indonesia | Surakarta | Manahan Sports Hall | | | |
| Indonesia | Tangerang | Indonesia Convention Exhibition | 2015 | 18,000 | |
| Indonesia | Tangerang | Dasana Indah Sports Hall | 2018 | | |
| Indonesia | Tasikmalaya | Susi Susanti Sports Hall | | | |
| Indonesia | Yogyakarta | Among Rogo Sports Hall | | 5,000 | |
| Indonesia | Yogyakarta | Yogyakarta State University Sports Hall | | 5,000 | |
| Iran | Amol | Payambar Azam Arena | | 3,000 | |
| Iran | Ardebil | Rezazadeh Stadium | 2006 | 6,000 | 2017 Asian Men's U23 Volleyball Championship |
| Iran | Isfahan | Naghsh-e-Jahan Arena | 2012 | 6,000 | |
| Iran | Isfahan | Pirouzi Arena | | 4,300 | 2010 AFC Futsal Club Championship |
| Iran | Qarchak | 7th Tir Arena | | 3,000 | Shahid Mansouri |
| Iran | Sari | Sayed Rasoul Hosseini Arena | | 5,000 | |
| Iran | Saveh | Fajr-e Felestin Hall | | 2,500 | Shahrdari Saveh |
| Iran | Tabriz | Shahid Pour Sharifi Arena | 2009 | 6,000 | 2014 Asian Men's Junior Handball Championship |
| Iran | Tehran | Azadi Indoor Stadium | 1974 | 12,000 | 2014 FILA Wrestling World Cup - Men's Greco-Roman |
| Iran | Tehran | Azadi Basketball Hall | 1971 | 3,000 | 2016 FIBA Asia Challenge |
| Iran | Tehran | Azadi Volleyball Hall | 1971 | 3,000 | |
| Iran | Tehran | Shohadaye haftom Tir Indoor Stadium | 1957 | 6,000 | |
| Iran | Tehran | Tehran House of Volleyball | | 1,500 | |
| Iran | Urmia | Ghadir Arena of Urmia | 2007 | 6,000 | 2010 Asian Men's Volleyball Cup |
| Israel (list) | Ashdod | HaKirya Arena | 2000 | 2,200 | Maccabi Ashdod |
| Israel (list) | Ashkelon | Ashkelon Sports Arena | 1999 | 3,000 | Ironi Ashkelon |
| Israel (list) | Be'er Sheva | Conch Arena | 2013 | 3,000 | Hapoel Be'er Sheva |
| Israel (list) | Hadera | Enerbox | 2020 | 2,800 | Maccabi Hadera |
| Israel (list) | Haifa | Romema Arena | 1976 | 5,000 | Maccabi Haifa |
| Israel (list) | Gan Ner | Gan Ner Sports Hall | 2008 | 2,057 | Hapoel Gilboa Galil |
| Israel (list) | Holon | Holon Toto Hall | 2015 | 5,500 | Hapoel Holon |
| Israel (list) | Jerusalem | Malha Arena | 1985 | 2,000 | |
| Israel (list) | Jerusalem | Pais Arena | 2014 | 11,000 | Hapoel Jerusalem |
| Israel (list) | Rishon LeZon | Beit Maccabi Arena | 2008 | 2,200 | Maccabi Rishon LeZion |
| Israel (list) | Tel Aviv | Menora Mivtachim Arena | 1963 | 10,383 | Maccabi Tel Aviv |
| Israel (list) | Tel Aviv | Drive in Arena | 2014 | 3,504 | Hapoel Tel Aviv |
| Japan (List) | Akita | Akita Prefectural Gymnasium | 1968 | 6,000 | |
| Japan (List) | Akita | CNA Arena | 1994 | 5,000 | 2001 World Games |
| Japan (List) | Aomori | Maeda Arena | 2002 | 5,500 | |
| Japan (List) | Asahikawa | Asahikawa City Gymnasium | 1979 | 1,494 | |
| Japan (List) | Chiba | Port Arena | 1991 | 7,512 | |
| Japan (List) | Echizen | Sun Dome Fukui | 1995 | 10,000 | 1995 World Artistic Gymnastics Championships |
| Japan (List) | Fukuoka | Citizens Gymnasium | 1972 | 3,500 | Rizing Zephyr Fukuoka |
| Japan (List) | Fukuoka | Kyuden Kinen Gymnasium | 1964 | 1,992 | |
| Japan (List) | Fukuoka | Marine Messe Fukuoka | 1995 | 15,000 | 2001 World Aquatics Championships |
| Japan (List) | Fukuroi | Ecopa Arena | 2001 | 10,000 | |
| Japan (List) | Funabashi | Funabashi Arena | 1993 | 4,368 | Chiba Jets Funabashi |
| Japan (List) | Ginowan | Okinawa Convention Center | 1987 | 5,000 | |
| Japan (List) | Hachinohe | Niida Indoor Rink | 1984 | 1,576 | Tohoku Free Blades |
| Japan (List) | Hachioji | Esforta Arena | 2014 | 2,000 | Tokyo Hachioji Trains |
| Japan (List) | Hakodate | Hakodate Arena | 2015 | 5,000 | |
| Japan (List) | Hamamatsu | Hamamatsu Arena | 1990 | 8,000 | 2006 FIBA World Championship |
| Japan (List) | Hamamatsu | Green Arena | 2002 | 1,070 | |
| Japan (List) | Hiroshima | Hiroshima Green Arena | 1994 | 10,000 | 2006 FIBA World Championship |
| Japan (List) | Hiroshima | Hiroshima Sun Plaza | 1985 | 6,052 | 2011 FIVB Women's World Cup |
| Japan (List) | Ise | Sun Arena | 1994 | 11,000 | 2011 FIVB Women's World Cup |
| Japan (List) | Izumo | Izumo Dome | 1992 | 2,500 | |
| Japan (List) | Kagoshima | Kagoshima Arena | 1992 | 5,700 | 2003 FIVB Women's World Cup |
| Japan (List) | Kanazawa | Ishikawa Sports Center | 2008 | 5,000 | |
| Japan (List) | Kanazawa | Kanazawa City General Gymnasium | 1985 | 2,312 | Kanazawa Samuraiz |
| Japan (List) | Kawasaki | Todoroki Arena | 1995 | 6,500 | Toshiba Brave Thunders Kanagawa |
| Japan (List) | Kobe | Kobe Green Arena | | 6,000 | 2006 FIVB Women's World Championship, 2008 FIVB World Grand Prix |
| Japan (List) | Kobe | World Memorial Hall | 1964 | 8,000 | |
| Japan (List) | Komatsu | Komatsu Dome | 1997 | 1,500 | |
| Japan (List) | Koriyama | Koriyama General Gymnasium | 1973 | 7,056 | Fukushima Firebonds |
| Japan (List) | Koshigaya | Koshigaya Municipal Gymnasium | 1987 | 4,472 | Otsuka Corporation Alphas |
| Japan (List) | Kumamoto | Kumamoto Prefectural Gymnasium | 1982 | 4,110 | Kumamoto Volters |
| Japan (List) | Kumamoto | Park Dome Kumamoto | 1997 | 2,000 | |
| Japan (List) | Kushiro | Kushiro Ice Arena | 1996 | 3,039 | Nippon Paper Cranes |
| Japan (List) | Maebashi | Yamada Green Dome | 1990 | 20,000 | 1990 UCI Track Cycling World Championships |
| Japan (List) | Maebashi | Yamato Citizens Gymnasium | 1980 | 2,205 | Gunma Crane Thunders |
| Japan (List) | Matsumoto | Matsumoto City Gymnasium | 1991 | 6,000 | 2010 Women's Volleyball World Championship |
| Japan (List) | Misawa | Misawa International Sports Center | 2017 | 1,808 | |
| Japan (List) | Mito | Aoyagi Park Citizens Gymnasium | 1973 | 2,736 | Cyberdyne Ibaraki Robots |
| Japan (List) | Morioka | Morioka Takaya Arena | 1989 | 5,058 | Iwate Big Bulls |
| Japan (List) | Nagano | Aqua Wing Arena | 1997 | 2,000 | 1998 Winter Olympics, 2011 FIVB Women's World Cup |
| Japan (List) | Nagano | M-Wave | 1996 | 18,000 | 1998 Winter Olympics |
| Japan (List) | Nagano | Big Hat | 1995 | 10,104 | 1998 Winter Olympics |
| Japan (List) | Nagano | White Ring | 1996 | 7,000 | 1998 Winter Olympics, 2011 FIVB Women's World Cup |
| Japan (List) | Nagoya | Aichi Prefectural Gymnasium | 1964 | 7,514 | Nagoya Diamond Dolphins |
| Japan (List) | Nagoya | Nippon Gaishi Hall | 1987 | 10,000 | 2013 FIVB Women's World Grand Champions Cup, 2015 FIVB Women's World Cup |
| Japan (List) | Niigata | Higashi General Sports Center | 1998 | 3,120 | |
| Japan (List) | Nikkō | Nikko Kirifuri Ice Arena | 1992 | 2,000 | Nikkō Ice Bucks |
| Japan (List) | Nishinomiya | Nishinomiya City Central Gymnasium | 1965 | 2,356 | Nishinomiya Storks |
| Japan (List) | Nishitōkyō | DyDo Drinco Ice Arena | 1984 | 3,500 | |
| Japan (List) | Noshiro | Noshiro City General Gymnasium | 1993 | 2,012 | |
| Japan (List) | Obihiro | Obihiro City General Gymnasium | 1972 | 4,310 | |
| Japan (List) | Odate | Takumi Arena | 2005 | 2,100 | |
| Japan (List) | Okayama | Okayama General and Cultural Gymnasium | 1982 | 8,000 | 2003 FIVB Volleyball Men's World Cup |
| Japan (List) | Okayama | Momotaro Arena | 2005 | 11,000 | 2015 FIVB Women's World Cup |
| Japan (List) | Okinawa | Okinawa City Gymnasium | 2010 | 2,123 | |
| Japan (List) | Osaka | Edion Arena Osaka | 1987 | 8,000 | 2013 FIVB Men's World Grand Champions Cup |
| Japan (List) | Osaka | Fumin Kyosai Super Arena | 1996 | 7,056 | |
| Japan (List) | Osaka | Namihaya Dome | 1996 | 10,000 | |
| Japan (List) | Osaka | Osaka Municipal Central Gymnasium | | 10,000 | 2012 FIVB World Grand Prix |
| Japan (List) | Osaka | Osaka-jō Hall | 1983 | 16,000 | |
| Japan (List) | Otsu | Ukaruchan Arena | 1973 | 4,896 | Shiga Lakestars |
| Japan (List) | Rifu | Sekisui Heim Super Arena | 1997 | 7,063 | |
| Japan (List) | Saitama | Saitama Super Arena | 2000 | 36,500 | 2015 FIVB World Grand Prix, Knockout stage of 2006 FIBA World Championship, including the bronze medal game and the final |
| Japan (List) | Sapporo | Hokkaido Prefectural Sports Center | 1999 | 8,000 | 2006 FIBA World Championship, 2013 FIVB World Grand Prix |
| Japan (List) | Sapporo | Makomanai Ice Arena | 1970 | 11,500 | ice hockey games from the 1972 Winter Olympics |
| Japan (List) | Sapporo | Tsukisamu Gymnasium | 1972 | 3,371 | 1972 Winter Olympics |
| Japan (List) | Sendai | Kamei Arena | 1984 | 7,000 | 2013 FIVB World Grand Prix, 2015 FIVB Women's World Cup |
| Japan (List) | Sendai | Shellcom Sendai | 2000 | 1,050 | |
| Japan (List) | Sendai | Xebio Arena | 2012 | 4,002 | |
| Japan (List) | Tachikawa | Tachikawa Tachihi Arena | 2017 | 3,000 | |
| Japan (List) | Tendo | Yamagata Prefectural Gymnasium | 1992 | 3,976 | Yamagata Wyverns |
| Japan (List) | Tokorozawa | Tokorozawa Municipal Gymnasium | 2004 | 4,308 | Saitama Broncos |
| Japan (List) | Tokushima | Asty Tokushima | 1993 | 5,000 | 2007 Asian Basketball Championship |
| Japan (List) | Tokyo | Ariake Coliseum | 1987 | 10,000 | 2011 FIVB World Grand Prix, 2014 FIVB World Grand Prix |
| Japan (List) | Tokyo | Komazawa Gymnasium | 1964 | 3,875 | 1964 Summer Olympics Several matches of 2019 FIBA Basketball World Cup Asian Qualifiers |
| Japan (List) | Tokyo | Korakuen Hall | 1962 | 2,005 | |
| Japan (List) | Tokyo | Nippon Budokan | 1964 | 14,471 | 1964 Summer Olympics |
| Japan (List) | Tokyo | Ota City General Gymnasium | 2013 | 4,012 | Earthfriends Tokyo Z |
| Japan (List) | Tokyo | Ryōgoku Sumo Hall | 1985 | 11,098 | |
| Japan (List) | Tokyo | Tokyo Metropolitan Gymnasium | 1954 | 10,000 | 2009 FIVB World Grand Prix |
| Japan (List) | Tokyo | Yoyogi National Gymnasium | 1964 | 13,291 | ice hockey, basketball, 2010 FIVB Women's World Championship |
| Japan (List) | Tomakomai | Hakucho Arena | 1996 | 4,015 | |
| Japan (List) | Toyama | Toyama City Gymnasium | | 5,000 | |
| Japan (List) | Toyama | Toyama General Sports Center | 1984 | 3,024 | |
| Japan (List) | Utsunomiya | Brex Arena | 1979 | 2,900 | Link Tochigi Brex |
| Japan (List) | Yokkaichi | Yokkaichi Dome | 1997 | 4,704 | |
| Japan (List) | Yokohama | Yokohama Arena | 1989 | 17,000 | 2008 FIVB World Grand Prix |
| Japan (List) | Yokohama | Yokohama Cultural Gymnasium | 1962 | 5,000 | |
| Kazakhstan | Almaty | Almaty Arena | 2016 | 12,000 | |
| Kazakhstan | Almaty | Baluan Sholak Sports Palace | 1967 | 5,000 | 2004 Asian Judo Championships |
| Kazakhstan | Astana | Alau Ice Palace | 2011 | 8,000 | 2011 Asian Winter Games, 2015 World Sprint Speed Skating Championships |
| Kazakhstan | Astana | Barys Arena | 2015 | 11,578 | |
| Kazakhstan | Astana | Daulet National Tennis Center | 2008 | 2,700 | Kazakhstan Fed Cup team |
| Kazakhstan | Astana | Kazakhstan Sports Palace | 2001 | 4,070 | |
| Kazakhstan | Astana | Saryarka Velodrome | 2011 | 10,000 | BC Astana |
| Kazakhstan | Karaganda | Akzholtay Sports Palace | 1972 | 2,500 | |
| Kazakhstan | Karaganda | Karagandy Arena | 2011 | 5,500 | Saryarka Karagandy |
| Kazakhstan | Oskemen | Boris Alexandrov Sports Palace | 1968 | 4,400 | Kazzinc-Torpedo |
| Korea (North) | Pyongyang | Pyongyang Arena | 2003 | 12,309 | |
| Korea (North) | Pyongyang | Pyongyang Indoor Stadium | 1973 | 20,100 | |
| Korea (South) (List) | Anyang | Anyang Gymnasium | 2000 | 6,690 | |
| Korea (South) (List) | Busan | Sajik Arena | 1985 | 14,099 | |
| Korea (South) (List) | Changwon | Masan Gymnasium | 1980 | 5,000 | |
| Korea (South) (List) | Changwon | Changwon Indoor Gymnasium | 1996 | 6,000 | |
| Korea (South) (List) | Cheonan | Ryu Gwansun Gymnasium | 2001 | 6,000 | |
| Korea (South) (List) | Daejeon | Choong Mu Gymnasium | 1970 | 6,000 | |
| Korea (South) (List) | Gangneung | Catholic Kwandong University Gymnasium | 2017 | 6,000 | 2018 Winter Olympics |
| Korea (South) (List) | Gangneung | Gangneung Gymnasium | 1998 | 3,500 | 1999 Asian Winter Games |
| Korea (South) (List) | Gangneung | Gangneung Hockey Center | 2016 | 10,000 | 2018 Winter Olympics |
| Korea (South) (List) | Gangneung | Gangneung Ice Arena | 2016 | 12,000 | 2018 Winter Olympics |
| Korea (South) (List) | Goyang | Goyang Gymnasium | 2011 | 6,216 | 2014 Asian Games |
| Korea (South) (List) | Gapyeong-gun | Cheongshim World Peace Center | 2012 | 16 979 | |
| Korea (South) (List) | Gumi | Park Chung-hee Gymnasium | 2001 | 6,277 | |
| Korea (South) (List) | Gwangju | Women's University Universiade Gymnasium | | 8,314 | |
| Korea (South) (List) | Incheon | Namdong Gymnasium | 2013 | 8,828 | |
| Korea (South) (List) | Incheon | Samsan World Gymnasium | 2006 | 7,220 | 2014 Asian Games |
| Korea (South) (List) | Incheon | Gyeyang Gymnasium | 2013 | 4,270 | |
| Korea (South) (List) | Jeonju | Jeonju Indoor Gymnasium | 1973 | 4,730 | |
| Korea (South) (List) | Seongnam | Sangmu Gymnasium | 1986 | 5,000 | 1988 Seoul Olympics |
| Korea (South) (List) | Seoul | Hanyang University Gymnasium | 1986 | 8,000 | 1988 Seoul Olympics |
| Korea (South) (List) | Seoul | Jamsil Arena | 1979 | 11,069 | 1988 Seoul Olympics |
| Korea (South) (List) | Seoul | Jamsil Students' Gymnasium | 1976 | 7,500 | 1988 Seoul Olympics |
| Korea (South) (List) | Seoul | Jangchung Arena | 1963 | 4,507 | 1979 FIBA Women's World Championship |
| Korea (South) (List) | Seoul | Olympic Gymnastics Arena | 1986 | 15,000 | 1988 Seoul Olympics |
| Korea (South) (List) | Seoul | Olympic Handball Gymnasium | 1986 | 5,003 | |
| Korea (South) (List) | Seoul | Seoul Student Gymnaisium | 1977 | 5,400 | 1988 Seoul Olympics |
| Korea (South) (List) | Seoul | Seoul National University Gymnasium | 1986 | 5,000 | 1988 Seoul Olympics |
| Korea (South) (List) | Suwon | Suwon Gymnasium | 1984 | 5,145 | |
| Korea (South) (List) | Ulsan | Dongchun Gymnasium | 2001 | 5,831 | |
| Korea (South) (List) | Wonju | Wonju Sports Complex | 2013 | 4,594 | |
| Kuwait | Kuwait City | Fajhan Hilal Al-Mutairi Court | | 5,000 | Al Qadisiya Kuwait |
| Lebanon | Beirut | Indoor Olympic Stadium | | | |
| Lebanon | Ghazir | Ghazir Club Court | | 5,000 | Ghazir Volleyball |
| Malaysia | Bintulu | Stadium Muhibbah | 1995 | 2,000 | |
| Malaysia | George Town | SPICE Arena | 1997 | 10,000 | |
| Malaysia | George Town | Han Chiang Indoor Stadium | 1966 | 6,000 | |
| Malaysia | Johor Bahru | Arena Larkin | 2020 | 7,000 | |
| Malaysia | Johor Bahru | EduCity Indoor Arena | 2016 | 2,000 | Playoffs MLBB MPL Malaysia S14 (2024) |
| Malaysia | Kuala Lumpur | Unifi Arena | 1998 | 16,000 | MLBB M1 World Championship (2019) & MLBB M6 World Championship (2024) |
| Malaysia | Kuala Lumpur | Stadium Negara | 1962 | 10,000 | |
| Malaysia | Kuala Lumpur | Stadium Badminton Kuala Lumpur | 1990 | 4,500 | |
| Malaysia | Kuching | Stadium Perpaduan | 1988 | 4,525 | |
| Malaysia | Miri | Miri Indoor Stadium | 1998 | 4,000 | |
| Malaysia | Shah Alam | Malawati Stadium | 1998 | 13,000 | |
| Malaysia | Sibu | Bukit Lima Indoor Stadium | 1990 | 2,000 | |
| Malaysia | Sibu | Sibu Indoor Stadium | 2016 | 4,250 | 2016 Sukma Games, 2017 Malaysia Masters Grand Prix Gold |
| | Seremban | Karisma Arena | 2024 | 3,000 | |
| Philippines (list) | Angeles City | Angeles University Foundation Sports Arena | 2012 | 5,000 | Pampanga Giant Lanterns (June 2018–present) |
| Philippines (list) | Antipolo | Ynares Center | | 7,400 | Philippine Basketball Association (2001–present), Rizal Golden Coolers (June 2018–present) Philippine Super Liga |
| Philippines (list) | Argao | Diosdado Macapagal Sports Center | 2008 | 2,000 | |
| Philippines (list) | Bacolod | Bacolod Sports Center | | 2,000 | |
| Philippines (list) | Bacolod | La Salle Coliseum | 1998 | 8,000 | Negros Slashers (1998–2002) |
| Philippines (list) | Bacolod | Negros Occidental Multi-Purpose Activity Center | | 2,000 | |
| Philippines (list) | Bacolod | West Negros University Gym | | | |
| Philippines (list) | Bacoor | Bacoor Sports Gymnasium | 2015 | 4,000 | Bacoor City Strikers (June 2018–present) |
| Philippines (list) | Bago | Bago Coliseum | 1995 | 4,000 | |
| Philippines (list) | Baguio | University of Baguio Gymnasium | | | University of Baguio Basketball Team |
| Philippines (list) | Balanga | Bataan People's Center | | 4,000 | Bataan Risers (January 2018–present) |
| Philippines (list) | Baliuag | Baliuag Star Arena | | 2,000 | Bulacan Kuyas (alternate venue since June 2018–present) |
| Philippines (list) | Batangas City | Batangas City Coliseum | | 4,000 | Batangas City Athletics (January 2018–present) |
| Philippines (list) | Bayugan | Asis Memorial Gymnasium | 2009 | 3,000 | |
| Philippines (list) | Biñan | Alonte Sports Arena | 2013 | 6,500 | |
| Philippines (list) | Bocaue | Philippine Arena | 2014 | 55,000 | Iglesia ni Cristo Centennial Celebration Events; 2023 FIBA Basketball World Cup (opening ceremony, opening game) |
| Philippines (list) | Butuan | FSUU Morelos Gym | 2008 | 2,000 | |
| Philippines (list) | Butuan | Polysports Basketball Arena | 2016 | 4,000 | |
| Philippines (list) | Cabagan | Josefina T. Albano Sports Center | | 3,000 | |
| Philippines (list) | Cabanatuan | Araullo University Gym | | 3,000 | Nueva Ecija Patriots (1999-2001) |
| Philippines (list) | Cagayan | USTP Gymnasium | 2013 | 3,000 | |
| Philippines (list) | Cagayan | Xavier Ateneo Sports Centre | 2017 | 4,500 | |
| Philippines (list) | Cagayan | Xavier University Gym | | 3,500 | |
| Philippines (list) | Caloocan | Caloocan Sports Complex | 2018 | 3,000 | Caloocan Supremos (January 2018–present) |
| Philippines (list) | Cavite City | Recoletos 4th Centennial Gymnasium | 2004 | 3,000 | |
| Philippines (list) | Cebu City | Cebu Coliseum | 1962 | 5,000 | |
| Philippines (list) | Danao | Danao Civic Center | 2003 | 2,000 | |
| Philippines (list) | Dapa | Dapa Municipal Gymnasium | 2014 | 2,000 | |
| Philippines (list) | Dapitan | Dapitan Cultural and Sports Center | 2000 | 5,000 | |
| Philippines (list) | Davao City | Davao City Recreation Center | | 2,500 | Davao Occidental Tigers (alternate venue) |
| Philippines (list) | Davao City | Davao College Gym | 2001 | 3,000 | |
| Philippines (list) | Davao City | Rizal Memorial College Gym | | 2,500 | Davao Occidental Tigers (primary venue since June 2018–present) |
| Philippines (list) | Davao City | USEP Gymnasium | 2012 | 5,000 | |
| Philippines (list) | Digos | Davao del Sur Coliseum | 2010 | 7,000 | |
| Philippines (list) | Dipolog | Zamboanga del Norte Cultural and Sports Center | 2012 | 10,000 | |
| Philippines (list) | Dipolog | Dipolog Sports Center | 2012 | 10,000 | |
| Philippines (list) | Dumaguete | Cong. Lamberto L. Macias Sports and Cultural Center | | 5,000 | |
| Philippines (list) | General Santos | Lagao Gymnasium | | 6,000 | South Cotabato Warriors (June 2018–present) |
| Philippines (list) | Iligan | MSU-IIT Gymnasium | 1968 | 5,000 | |
| Philippines (list) | Iloilo City | San Agustin Gymnasium | 1965 | 6,000 | |
| Philippines (list) | Iloilo City | Central Philippine University Gym | 2005 | 2,000 | |
| Philippines (list) | Imus | Apostle Arsenio T. Ferriol Sports Complex | 2010 | 10,420 | |
| Philippines (list) | Kalibo | ABL Sports & Cultural Complex | 1993 | 3,000 | |
| Philippines (list) | Koronadal | South Cotabato Sports Complex | | 8,000 | |
| Philippines (list) | La Paz | La Paz Municipal Gymnasium | 2017 | 2,000 | |
| Philippines (list) | Laoag | Ilocos Norte Centennial Arena | | 6,000 | 2012 PBA All-Star Weekend |
| Philippines (list) | Lapu-Lapu | Hoops Dome | 2011 | 6,000 | |
| Philippines (list) | Legazpi City | Albay Astrodome | | 4,000 | |
| Philippines (list) | Legazpi City | Ibalong Centrum for Recreation | 2010 | 8,000 | Bicol Volcanoes (2019–present) |
| Philippines (list) | Lingayen | Narciso Ramos Sports Center | 1995 | 5,000 | |
| Philippines (list) | Lipa | De La Salle Lipa Sentrum | 1995 | 2,500 | |
| Philippines (list) | Lucena | Quezon Convention Center | 2001 | 7,000 | Philippine Basketball Association (2016–present), Quezon Huskers (2023–present) |
| Philippines (list) | Makati | Makati Coliseum | 1997 | 3,000 | |
| Philippines (list) | Malolos City | Malolos Sports and Convention Center | 2010 | 5,000 | Philippine Super Liga (spike-on-tour matches); Bulacan Kuyas (alternate venue since 2019) |
| Philippines (list) | Malolos City | Bulacan Capitol Gymnasium | 2010 | 3,000 | Bulacan Kuyas (primary venue since 2018) |
| Philippines (list) | Mandaue | Mandaue City Sports Complex | | 4,000 | |
| Philippines (list) | Manila | Ninoy Aquino Stadium | 1989 | 6,000 | UAAP, NCAA, Alternate venue of 2013 FIBA Asia Championship |
| Philippines (list) | Manila | Rizal Memorial Coliseum | 1934 | 8,000 | UAAP, NCAA, 2005 SEA Games, Alternate venue of 1978 FIBA World Championship |
| Philippines (list) | Manila | Quadricentennial Pavilion | 2011 | 5,792 | UST Growling Tigers |
| Philippines (list) | Manila | San Andres Gym | | 3,000 | Manila Stars (June 2018–present) |
| Philippines (list) | Marikina | Marikina Sports Center | 1969 | 7,000 | |
| Philippines (list) | Mati | DOSCST Gym | | 3,000 | |
| Philippines (list) | Muntinlupa | Fr. Bellarmine Baltasar Gymnasium | 1997 | 1,400 | San Beda College Alabang Red Lions |
| Philippines (list) | Muntinlupa | Muntinlupa Sports Center | | | Muntinlupa Cagers (2018–present) |
| Philippines (list) | Naga | Jesse M. Robredo Coliseum | 2010 | 12,000 | |
| Philippines (list) | Ormoc | Ormoc City Superdome | | | |
| Philippines (list) | Panabo | Panabo Multi-Purpose Tourism Cultural & Sports Center | | 6,000 | |
| Philippines (list) | Parañaque | Olivarez Sports Center | | 3,500 | Olivarez College Basketball Team |
| Philippines (list) | Pasay | Cuneta Astrodome | 1993 | 12,000 | Philippine Basketball Association (1993–1998) |
| Philippines (list) | Pasay | Mall of Asia Arena | 2012 | 20,000 | UAAP, NCAA, Philippine Basketball Association, 2013 FIBA Asia Championship primary venue (including knockout stage) |
| Philippines (list) | Pasig | Pasig City Sports Center | 2015 | 2,500 | Pasig-Rizal Pirates (1998-2000) |
| Philippines (list) | Pasig | PhilSports Arena | 1970's | 10,000 | Philippine Basketball Association (1985–1992, 1999–2002) 2023 FIBA Basketball World Cup (several matches) |
| Philippines (list) | Pasig | Ynares Sports Arena | 2008 | 3,000 | Pasig City MCW Sports |
| Philippines (list) | Polomolok | Polomolok Gymnasium | 2015 | 6,000 | |
| Philippines (list) | Puerto Princesa | Puerto Princesa City Coliseum | 2003 | 8,000 | 2010 PBA All-Star Weekend, 2015 PBA All-Star Weekend |
| Philippines (list) | Quezon City | Blue Eagle Gym | 1949 | 7,500 | Ateneo Blue Eagles & Manila Metrostars (1998–2000), Quezon City Capitals (alternate venue) |
| Philippines (list) | Quezon City | JCSGO Gym | | 2,000 | |
| Philippines (list) | Quezon City | Smart Araneta Coliseum | 1960 | 25,000 | PBA, UAAP 1978 FIBA World Championship (including final) 2017 SEABA Championship 2023 FIBA Basketball World Cup (several matches) |
| Philippines (list) | Roxas | Capiz Gymnasium | | 6,000 | |
| Philippines (list) | Roxas | Dinggoy Roxas Civic Center | | 2,000 | |
| Philippines (list) | San Fernando | Bren Z. Guiao Sports Complex | | 3,000 | Pampanga Giant Lanterns (2018–present) |
| Philippines (list) | San Fernando | Pacoy Ortega Gym | | 2,000 | |
| Philippines (list) | San Fernando | University of the Assumption Gym | | 2,000 | |
| Philippines (list) | San Juan | San Juan Gym | | 2,000 | |
| Philippines (list) | San Juan | Filoil Flying V Center | 2006 | 5,500 | NCAA San Juan Knights (present-day, since 2018) ESports and 3x3 Basketball (2019 Southeast Asian Games) |
| Philippines (list) | Santa Cruz | San Luis Sports Complex | | 2,500 | |
| Philippines (list) | Santa Rosa | Santa Rosa Multi-Purpose Complex | 2017 | 5,700 | 2018 ABL finals, San Miguel Alab Pilipinas |
| Philippines (list) | Santo Domingo | Santo Domingo Coliseum | | 3,000 | |
| Philippines (list) | Sindangan | Sindangan Cultural & Sports Center | 2015 | 8,000 | |
| Philippines (list) | Sindangan | Saint Joseph College Gymnasium | 2000's | 2,000 | |
| Philippines (list) | Sindangan | Sindangan National Agricultural School Gymnasium | 2000's | 1,500 | |
| Philippines (list) | Subic | Subic Gymnasium | | 2,000 | 2020–21 MPBL playoffs |
| Philippines (list) | Surigao City | Surigao Provincial Gymnasium | 2010 | 3,500 | |
| Philippines (list) | Tacloban | Tacloban Metropolitan Arena | 2006 | 5,000 | |
| Philippines (list) | Tubod | Mindanao Civic Center | | 12,000 | |
| Philippines (list) | Tuguegarao | Cagayan Sports Coliseum | 2015 | 5,000 | |
| Philippines (list) | Urdaneta | Urdaneta Sports Center | | 5,000 | |
| Philippines (list) | Victorias | Victorias City Coliseum | 2007 | 8,000 | |
| Philippines (list) | Zamboanga City | One SCC Civic Center | 2016 | 3,500 | |
| Philippines (list) | Zamboanga City | UZ Arena | | 7,000 | |
| Philippines (list) | Zamboanga City | Zamboanga City Coliseum | 2002 | 10,000 | Zamboanga Master Sardines (2019–present) |
| Pakistan | Islamabad | Liaquat Gymnasium | | 10,223 | |
| Pakistan | Karachi | Arena's Ice-skating Rink | 2007 | | |
| Pakistan | Karachi | City Sports Complex | | 5,000 | |
| Qatar | Doha | Ali Bin Hamad al-Attiyah Arena | 2014 | 7,700 | 2015 World Men's Handball Championship |
| Qatar | Doha | Duhail Handball Sports Hall | 2014 | 5,500 | 2015 IHF Super Globe |
| Qatar | Lusail | Lusail Sports Arena | 2014 | 15,300 | 2015 World Men's Handball Championship |
| Saudi Arabia | Riyadh | GPYW Indoor Stadium | | 5,000 | Al-Hilal |
| Singapore | Singapore | Bishan Sports Hall | | 1,920 | 2010 Summer Youth Olympics |
| Singapore | Singapore | Singapore Indoor Stadium | 1989 | 12,000 | Singapore Slingers, Singapore Slammers |
| Singapore | Singapore | Toa Payoh Sports Hall | | 2,000 | |
| Syria | Aleppo | Al-Assad Sports Arena | 1978 | 5,000 | |
| Syria | Aleppo | Al-Hamadaniah Sports Arena | 2012 | 8,000 | |
| Taiwan (Republic of China) | Taipei | Taipei Arena | 2005 | 15,085 | Concerts, basketball games, miscellaneous events |
| Taiwan (Republic of China) | Taipei | Taipei Gymnasium | 1994 | 2,340 | 2006 Taipei International Invitational Futsal Tournament |
| Taiwan (Republic of China) | Taipei | National Taiwan University Sports Center | 2001 | 4,200 | Concerts, basketball games, miscellaneous events |
| Taiwan (Republic of China) | Kaohsiung | Kaohsiung Arena | 2007 | 15,000 | 2009 The World Games |
| Taiwan (Republic of China) | New Taipei City | Xinzhuang Gymnasium | 2002 | 7,125 | 2008 FIVB Volleyball World Grand Prix, 2009 Summer Deaflympics |
| Taiwan (Republic of China) | Taoyuan | Taoyuan Arena | 1993 | 15,000 | |
| Thailand | Bangkok | Impact Arena | 1998 | 12,000 | Miss Universe 2018, Miss Universe 2005, PTT Thailand Open tennis, 1998 Asian Games 13th and concerts |
| Thailand | Bangkok | Hua Mark Indoor Stadium | 1966 | 15,000 | Volleyball, basketball, 2012 FIFA Futsal World Cup, 1998 Asian Games 13th, 2007 Summer Universiade and concerts |
| Thailand | Bangkok | Bangkok Arena | 2012 | 12,000 | 2012 FIFA Futsal World Cup |
| Thailand | Bangkok | Chanchai Acadium | 2012 | 6,000 | 2012 AFF Futsal Championship |
| Thailand | Bangkok | Lumpinee Boxing Stadium | 1956 | 9,500 | King's Cup Boxing, ONE Championship |
| Thailand | Bangkok | Nimibutr Indoor Stadium | 1963 | 5,600 | Concerts, basketball, 2012 FIFA Futsal World Cup, 1998 Asian Games 13th and Volleyball |
| Thailand | Bangkok | Rajadamnern Boxing Stadium | 1945 | 8,000 | |
| Thailand | Bangkok | Thai-Japanese Indoor Stadium | 1982 | 6,600 | 2005–2012 FIVB World Grand Prix |
| Thailand | Chiang Mai | Gymnasium 1 700th Anniversary Stadium | 1995 | 3,000 | 1995 Southeast Asian Games18th |
| Thailand | Chiang Mai | Gymnasium 2 700th Anniversary Stadium | 1995 | 5,000 | 1995 Southeast Asian Games 18th and concerts |
| Thailand | Nakhon Ratchasima | Korat Chatchai Hall | 2007 | 5,000 | 2007 Southeast Asian Games, 2012 FIFA Futsal World Cup |
| Thailand | Nakhon Ratchasima | Liptapanlop Hall | 2007 | 2,000 | 2007 Southeast Asian Games, 2013 FIVB Volleyball Girls' U18 World Championship |
| Thailand | Nakhon Pathom | Nakhon Pathom Gymnasium | | 4,000 | 2011 FIVB World Grand Prix |
| Thailand | Pathum Thani | Gymnasium 1 Thammasat Stadium | 1998 | 8,000 | 1998 Asian Games 13th and 2007 Summer Universiade and concerts |
| Thailand | Pathum Thani | Gymnasium 2 Thammasat Stadium | 1998 | 3,000 | 1998 Asian Games 13th and 2007 Summer Universiade |
| Thailand | Pathum Thani | Gymnasium 3 Thammasat Stadium | 1998 | 3,000 | 1998 Asian Games 13th and 2007 Summer Universiade |
| Thailand | Pathum Thani | Gymnasium 4 Thammasat Stadium | 1998 | 6,000 | 1998 Asian Games 13th and 2007 Summer Universiade |
| Thailand | Pathum Thani | Gymnasium 5 Thammasat Stadium | 1998 | 3,000 | 1998 Asian Games 13th and 2007 Summer Universiade |
| Thailand | Pathum Thani | Gymnasium 6 Thammasat Stadium | 1998 | 4,000 | 1998 Asian Games 13th and 2007 Summer Universiade |
| Thailand | Pathum Thani | Gymnasium 7 Thammasat Stadium | 1998 | | 1998 Asian Games 13th and 2007 Summer Universiade |
| Thailand | Phuket | Phuket Gymnasium | 2011 | 4,000 | Volleyball, basketball and futsal |
| United Arab Emirates | Abu Dhabi | Etihad Arena | 2021 | 18,000 | |
| United Arab Emirates | Dubai | Hamdan Sports Complex | 2010 | 15,000 | 2014 FIBA Under-17 World Championship, 2015 FIVB Volleyball Men's World Championship |
| United Arab Emirates | Dubai | Coca-Cola Arena | 2019 | 17,000 | |
| Uzbekistan | Tashkent | Humo Arena | | 12,500 | |
| Vietnam | Bắc Giang | Bắc Giang Gymnasium | 2019 | 4,500 | |
| Vietnam | Bắc Ninh | Bắc Ninh Gymnasium | | 2,500 | |
| Vietnam | Bắc Ninh | Bắc Ninh Sports University Gymnasium | | 1,500 | |
| Vietnam | Đà Nẵng | Tiên Sơn Sports Palace | 2010 | 7,200 | |
| Vietnam | Hà Nam | Hà Nam Gymnasium | 2014 | 7,500 | |
| Vietnam | Hanoi | Quần Ngựa Sports Palace | 2003 | 5,500 | |
| Vietnam | Hanoi | Hanoi Indoor Games Gymnasium | 2008 | 3,094 | |
| Vietnam | Hanoi | Hoài Đức Gymnasium | 2011 | 2,130 | |
| Vietnam | Ho Chi Minh City | Phú Thọ Indoor Stadium | 2003 | 8,000 | |
| Vietnam | Ho Chi Minh City | Nguyễn Du Gymnasium | 2003 | 3,000 | |
| Vietnam | Ho Chi Minh City | Tân Bình Gymnasium | 1997 | 2,068 | |
| Vietnam | Ninh Bình | Ninh Bình Province Sports Gymnasium | 2003 | 3,040 | |
| Vietnam | Quảng Ninh | Đại Yên Sports Arena | 2018 | 6,660 | |

== Europe ==
| Country | Location | Arena | Date built | Capacity | Tenant/use |
|---|---|---|---|---|---|
| Albania (list) | Durrës | Ramazan Njala Sports Palace | | 2,000 | BC Teuta |
| Albania (list) | Elbasan | Tomorr Sinani Sports Palace | 1982 | 2,200 | BC Elbasani |
| Albania (list) | Korce | Tamara Nikolla Sports Palace | 1975 | 2,400 | KS Skënderbeu |
| Albania (list) | Peshkopi | Bashkim Lala Sports Palace | 2009 | 2,000 | KS Korabi |
| Albania (list) | Shkodër | Qazim Dërvishi Sports Palace | 1969 | 1,200 | BC Vllaznia |
| Albania (list) | Tirana | Asllan Rusi Sports Palace | 1950 | 4,000 | PBC Tirana, BC Partizani Tirana |
| Albania (list) | Tirana | Farie Hoti Sports Palace | 2013 | 1,200 | KB Tirana |
| Albania (list) | Tirana | Tirana Olympic Park | 2017 | 1,200 | |
| Andorra | Andorra la Vella | Poliesportiu d'Andorra | 1991 | 5,000 | BC Andorra |
| Armenia | Yerevan | Karen Demirchyan Complex | 1983 | 8,000 | Junior Eurovision Song Contest 2011; Junior Eurovision Song Contest 2022 |
| Armenia | Yerevan | Mika Sports Arena | 2009 | 1,200 | Armenia national basketball team |
| Austria (list) | Dornbirn | Messestadion | 2002 | 4,270 | Dornbirner EC (EBEL) |
| Austria (list) | Feldkirch | Vorarlberghalle | 1977 | 5,200 | VEU Feldkirch |
| Austria (list) | Graz | Merkur Eisstadion | 1963 | 4,126 | Graz 99ers |
| Austria (list) | Graz | Schwarzl Freizeit Zentrum | | 5,000 | |
| Austria (list) | Graz | Stadthalle | 2002 | 11,030 | |
| Austria (list) | Innsbruck | Olympiahalle | 2004 | 12,000 | 1964 Winter Olympics |
| Austria (list) | Innsbruck | Tiroler Wasserkraft Arena | 2004 | 3,000 | HC Innsbruck |
| Austria (list) | Kapfenberg | Sportzentrum Kapfenberg | | 4,600 | |
| Austria (list) | Klagenfurt | Stadthalle | 1959 | 4,945 | EC KAC |
| Austria (list) | Linz | Keine Sorgen EisArena | 1986 | 4,863 | EHC Black Wings Linz |
| Austria (list) | Linz | TipsArena Linz | 1974 | 6,000 | |
| Austria (list) | Salzburg | Eisarena Salzburg | 1960 | 3,200 | EC Red Bull Salzburg |
| Austria (list) | Vienna | Albert Schultz Eishalle | 1995 | 7,022 | UPC Vienna Capitals |
| Austria (list) | Vienna | Ferry-Dusika-Hallenstadion | 1976 | 7,700 | 1979 European Athletics Indoor Championships |
| Austria (list) | Vienna | Wiener Stadthalle | 1958 | 16,152 | Eurovision Song Contest 2015 Eurovision Song Contest 2026 |
| Austria (list) | Villach | Stadthalle | 1969 | 4,500 | EC VSV |
| Austria (list) | Wels | Bosch-Halle | | 9,060 | |
| Austria (list) | Wiener Neustadt | Arena Nova | 1994 | 5,000 | 1995 World Women's Handball Championship |
| Azerbaijan | Baku | Baku Crystal Hall | 2011 | 27,000 | Eurovision Song Contest 2012 |
| Azerbaijan | Baku | Heydar Aliyev Sports and Concert Complex | 1990 | 8,000 | 2009 Rhythmic Gymnastics European Championships |
| Azerbaijan | Baku | National Gymnastics Arena | 2014 | 9,000 | |
| Belarus (list) | Minsk | Čyžoŭka Arena | 2013 | 9,614 | |
| Belarus (list) | Minsk | Minsk Arena | 2009 | 15,086 | Junior Eurovision Song Contest 2010 / 2018 |
| Belarus (list) | Minsk | Minsk Ice Palace | 1999 | 1,823 | |
| Belarus (list) | Minsk | Minsk Sports Palace | 1966 | 4,842 | |
| Belarus (list) | Babruysk | Babruysk Arena | 2008 | 7,151 | Shinnik Bobruisk |
| Belgium (list) | Aalst | Okapi Forum | | 2,800 | Okapi Aalstar |
| Belgium (list) | Antwerp | Sporthal Arena | 1966 | 2,100 | |
| Belgium (list) | Antwerp | Sportpaleis Antwerpen | 1933 | 23,359 | |
| Belgium (list) | Antwerp | Lotto Arena | 2007 | 8,050 | Port of Antwerp Giants |
| Belgium (list) | Bree | Expodroom | | 4,000 | Quatro Bree |
| Belgium (list) | Brussels | Forest National | 1970 | 8,400 | |
| Belgium (list) | Brussels | Palais 12 | 1989 | 15,000 | |
| Belgium (list) | Charleroi | RTL Spiroudome | 2002 | 6,300 | Spirou Charleroi |
| Belgium (list) | Ghent | Flanders Expo | 1987 | 13,000 | 1988 FIBA Champions Cup Final four |
| Belgium (list) | Ghent | Flanders Sports Arena | 2000 | 5,000 | 2001 World Artistic Gymnastics Championships |
| Belgium (list) | Hasselt | Ethias Arena | 2004 | 21,600 | Junior Eurovision Song Contest 2005 |
| Belgium (list) | Liège | Country Hall Liege | 1972 | 7,200 | |
| Belgium (list) | Mons | Mons.Arena | | 3,700 | |
| Belgium (list) | Ostend | Sleuyter Arena | 2006 | 5,000 | |
| Belgium (list) | Pepinster | Hall du Paire | 2006 | 4,000 | RBC Verviers-Pepinster |
| Bosnia and Herzegovina (list) | Banja Luka | Borik Sports Hall | 1974 | 3,500 | RK Borac Banja Luka |
| Bosnia and Herzegovina (list) | Bugojno | KSC Bugojno | 1983 | 4,200 | KK Iskra |
| Bosnia and Herzegovina (list) | Goražde | Mirsad Huric Hall | | 1,600 | |
| Bosnia and Herzegovina (list) | Laktaši | Laktaši Sports Hall | 2010 | 3,050 | |
| Bosnia and Herzegovina (list) | Ljubuški | Ljubuški Sports Hall | 1998 | 4,000 | HRK Izviđač |
| Bosnia and Herzegovina (list) | Sarajevo | Mirza Delibašić Hall | 1969 | 5,616 | KK Bosna |
| Bosnia and Herzegovina (list) | Sarajevo | Ramiz Salcin Hall | 2007 | 1,500 | |
| Bosnia and Herzegovina (list) | Sarajevo | Zetra Olympic Hall | 1982 | 12,000 | Bosnia and Herzegovina men's national handball team |
| Bosnia and Herzegovina (list) | Široki Brijeg | Pecara Hall | | 4,500 | HKK Široki |
| Bosnia and Herzegovina (list) | Tuzla | Mejdan Hall | 1984 | 5,000 | KK Sloboda Tuzla |
| Bosnia and Herzegovina (list) | Visoko | KSC Mladost | 1986 | 2,500 | |
| Bosnia and Herzegovina (list) | Zenica | Zenica Arena | 2009 | 10,000 | KK Čelik |
| Bulgaria (list) | Blagoevgrad | Skaptopara Hall | 2007 | 1,260 | |
| Bulgaria (list) | Botevgrad | Balkan Hall | 1965 | 1,000 | |
| Bulgaria (list) | Botevgrad | Arena Botevgrad | 2014 | 4,500 | BC Balkan, BC Botev 2012, Bulgaria national basketball team |
| Bulgaria (list) | Burgas | Arena Burgas | 2023 | 15,000 | BC Chernomorets |
| Bulgaria (list) | Burgas | Mladost Hall | 1987 | 1,500 | Neftochimik Burgas, Deya Sport |
| Bulgaria (list) | Dobrich | Dorbrotitsa Hall | 1983 | 2,300 | VC Dobrudja 07 |
| Bulgaria (list) | Dupnitsa | Dupnitsa Sports Hall | 2015 | 1,505 | BC Polyechnica |
| Bulgaria (list) | Gabrovo | Orlovetz Hall | 1991 | 2,400 | HC Beki, Bulgaria men's national handball team |
| Bulgaria (list) | Haskovo | Druzhba Hall | | 1,200 | |
| Bulgaria (list) | Panagyurishte | Asarel Arena | 2015 | 2,000 | BC Panagyurishte |
| Bulgaria (list) | Pazardzhik | PCS Vasil Levski Hall | | 1,700 | BC Hebar |
| Bulgaria (list) | Pernik | Boris Giuderov Hall | | 1,700 | BC Minyor 2015 |
| Bulgaria (list) | Pleven | Balkanstroy Hall | 1976 | 1,200 | BC Spartak Pleven |
| Bulgaria (list) | Plovdiv | Kolodruma | 2015 | 7,500 | |
| Bulgaria (list) | Plovdiv | Plovdiv University Sports Hall | 2012 | 1,037 | WVC Maritsa, VC Lokomotiv Avia |
| Bulgaria (list) | Plovdiv | Stroitel Hall | | 1,000 | |
| Bulgaria (list) | Plovdiv | SILA Hall | 2017 | 1,600 | BC Lokomotiv Plovdiv, BC Academic Bultex 99 |
| Bulgaria (list) | Ruse | Bulstrad Arena | 2015 | 6,300 | BC Dunav |
| Bulgaria (list) | Ruse | Dunav Hall | | 1,200 | WBC Dunav 8806 |
| Bulgaria (list) | Samokov | Arena Samokov | 2008 | 2,500 | BC Rilski Sportist |
| Bulgaria (list) | Samokov | Arena Samelyon | 2025 | 2,700 | BC Rilski Sportist |
| Bulgaria (list) | Sliven | Vasil Levski Hall | | 1,480 | BC Sliven, BC Tony-7, BC Beroe 07 |
| Bulgaria (list) | Silvnitsa | Silvnitsa Arena | 2014 | 1,050 | HC Silvnitsa |
| Bulgaria (list) | Stara Zagora | Municipal Hall | 1959 | 1,600 | BC Beroe |
| Bulgaria (list) | Sofia | Hristo Botev Hall | 1980 | 3,500 | |
| Bulgaria (list) | Sofia | Winter Stadium Slavia | 1974 | 2,100 | HC Slavia |
| Bulgaria (list) | Sofia | National Palace of Culture | 1981 | 3,880 | |
| Bulgaria (list) | Sofia | Festivalna Hall | 1968 | 9,000 | |
| Bulgaria (list) | Sofia | Universiada Hall | 1961 | 4,000 | |
| Bulgaria (list) | Sofia | Winter Sports Palace | 1982 | 4,600 | |
| Bulgaria (list) | Sofia | Arena 8888 Sofia | 2011 | 17,000 | Junior Eurovision Song Contest |
| Bulgaria (list) | Varna | Palace of Culture and Sports | 1968 | 6,000 | Euroins Cherno More, Bulgaria national volleyball team |
| Bulgaria (list) | Veliko Tarnovo | PCS Vasil Levski | 1985 | 1,860 | HC Etar-64 |
| Bulgaria (list) | Vidin | Festivalna Hall | 1969 | 1,200 | BC Vidabascket |
| Bulgaria (list) | Yambol | Diana Sports Hall | 1964 | 3,000 | BC Yambol |
| Croatia (list) | Gospić | Gradska Školska Sportska Dvorana | | 2,000 | |
| Croatia (list) | Karlovac | Mladost Hall | 1967 | 2,800 | HRK Karlovac |
| Croatia (list) | Metković | Metković Sports Hall | 1982 | 3,500 | RK Metković |
| Croatia (list) | Osijek | Gradski vrt Hall | 2008 | 3,538 | KK Vrijednosnice |
| Croatia (list) | Osijek | Jug Sport Hall | 2005 | 1,250 | |
| Croatia (list) | Osijek | Zrinjevac Sport Hall | 1973 | 1,650 | RK Osijek Elektromodul |
| Croatia (list) | Porec | Žatika Sport Centre | 2009 | 3,700 | |
| Croatia (list) | Pula | Mate Parlov Sport Centre | 2007 | 2,312 | |
| Croatia (list) | Rijeka | Centar Zamet | 2009 | 2,350 | RK Zamet |
| Croatia (list) | Rijeka | Dvorana Mladosti | 1973 | 3,960 | RK Zamet |
| Croatia (list) | Šibenik | Dvorana Baldekin | | 1,500 | GKK Šibenik |
| Croatia (list) | Split | Gripe Arena | 1979 | 6,000 | KK Split |
| Croatia (list) | Split | Spaladium Arena | 2008 | 12,339 | KK Split |
| Croatia (list) | Varaždin | Varaždin Arena | 2009 | 5,400 | |
| Croatia (list) | Vukovar | Borovo Sports Hall | 1978 | 3,000 | KK Borovo Vukovar |
| Croatia (list) | Zadar | Jazine Basketball Hall | 1968 | 3,000 | KK Sonik-Puntamika |
| Croatia (list) | Zadar | Krešimir Ćosić Hall | 2008 | 9,000 | KK Zadar |
| Croatia (list) | Zagreb | Arena Zagreb | 2009 | 24,000 | RK Zagreb |
| Croatia (list) | Zagreb | Dražen Petrović Basketball Hall | 1987 | 5,400 | KK Cibona |
| Croatia (list) | Zagreb | Dom Sportova | 1971 | 5,000 | KHL Medveščak |
| Croatia (list) | Zagreb | Trnsko Sports Hall | 1982 | 2,500 | KK Zagreb |
| Cyprus | Larnaca | Kition Athletic Center | | 2,000 | AEK Larnaca B.C. |
| Cyprus | Limassol | Nicos Solomonides | 2005 | 2,500 | |
| Cyprus | Limassol | Spyros Kiprianou Sports Centre | 2005 | 8,000 | Junior Eurovision Song Contest 2008 |
| Cyprus | Limassol | Themistokleio Sports Center | | 3,500 | Anorthosis VC |
| Cyprus | Nicosia | Costas Papaellinas Arena | | 2,000 | Keravnos BC |
| Cyprus | Nicosia | Eleftheria Indoor Hall | 1993 | 6,800 | ETHA Engomis |
| Cyprus | Nicosia | Lefkotheo Indoor Hall | 1980 | 3,000 | APOEL BC |
| Cyprus | Paphos | Aphroditi Sports Hall | 1991 | 2,000 | |
| Czech Republic (list) | Břeclav | Alcapast Arena | 1972 | 4,200 | HC Břeclav |
| Czech Republic (list) | Brno | DRFG Arena | 1982 | 7,700 | HC Kometa Brno |
| Czech Republic (list) | Brno | Sportovní hala Vodova | | 3,000 | 2010 FIBA World Championship for Women |
| Czech Republic (list) | České Budějovice | Budvar Arena | 2002 | 6,421 | HC České Budějovice |
| Czech Republic (list) | Chomutov | CEZ Stadion | 1948 | 6,000 | |
| Czech Republic (list) | Chomutov | SD aréna | 2011 | 5,250 | Piráti Chomutov |
| Czech Republic (list) | Havířov | Zimní stadion Havířov | 1950 | 5,100 | HC Havířov Panthers |
| Czech Republic (list) | Hradec Králové | Zimní stadion Hradec Králové | 1957 | 7,700 | Mountfield HK |
| Czech Republic (list) | Jihlava | Horácký zimní stadion | 1956 | 7,504 | HC Dukla Jihlava |
| Czech Republic (list) | Karlovy Vary | KV Arena | 2009 | 6,000 | HC Karlovy Vary |
| Czech Republic (list) | Karlovy Vary | Zimní stadion Karlovy Vary | 1947 | 4,680 | |
| Czech Republic (list) | Kladno | Zimni Stadion | 1949 | 5,200 | HC Kladno |
| Czech Republic (list) | Kravaře | Buly Arena | 2003 | 1,000 | |
| Czech Republic (list) | Liberec | Home Credit Arena | 2005 | 9,000 | Bílí Tygři Liberec |
| Czech Republic (list) | Litvínov | Ivan Hlinka Stadion | 1965 | 7,000 | HC Litvínov |
| Czech Republic (list) | Mladá Boleslav | Ško-Energo Aréna | 1956 | 4,200 | BK Mladá Boleslav |
| Czech Republic (list) | Olomouc | Zimní stadion Olomouc | 1948 | 5,500 | HC Olomouc |
| Czech Republic (list) | Ostrava | Ostravar Arena | 1986 | 12,500 | HC Vítkovice Steel |
| Czech Republic (list) | Opava | Zimní stadion Opava | 1953 | 5,500 | HC Slezan Opava |
| Czech Republic (list) | Pardubice | Tipsport Arena | 1960 | 10,300 | HC Pardubice |
| Czech Republic (list) | Plzeň | Home Monitoring Arena | 1969 | 8,236 | HC Plzeň 1929 |
| Czech Republic (list) | Prague | Královka Arena | 1965 | 2,500 | USK Praha |
| Czech Republic (list) | Prague | O2 Arena | 2004 | 18,000 | HC Slavia Praha and multi purposes |
| Czech Republic (list) | Prague | Tipsport Arena | 1962 | 13,150 | HC Sparta Praha and multi purposes |
| Czech Republic (list) | Přerov | Zimní stadion Přerov | 1969 | 3,000 | HC ZUBR Přerov |
| Czech Republic (list) | Třinec | Werk Arena | 1976 | 5,200 | HC Oceláři Třinec |
| Czech Republic (list) | Ústí nad Labem | Zlatopramen Arena | 2004 | 6,500 | HC Slovan Ústí nad Labem |
| Czech Republic (list) | Vsetín | Zimní stadion Na Lapači | 1966 | 5,400 | VHK Vsetín |
| Czech Republic (list) | Zlín | Trinity Bank Arena Luďka Čajky | 1957 | 7,500 | PSG Berani Zlín |
| Czech Republic (list) | Znojmo | Nevoga Arena | 1970 | 4,800 | Orli Znojmo |
| Denmark (list) | Aalborg | Aalborghallen | 1953 | 3,000 | |
| Denmark (list) | Aalborg | Gigantium | 1999 | 8,500 | Handball, ice hockey and multipurpose |
| Denmark (list) | Aarhus | Ceres Arena | 2001 | 5,001 | Handball, basketball and multipurpose |
| Denmark (list) | Aarhus | Vejilby-Risskov Hallen | 1969 | 1,152 | SK Aarhus |
| Denmark (list) | Copenhagen | Ballerup Super Arena | 2001 | 9,200 | |
| Denmark (list) | Copenhagen | Bella Center Copenhagen | 1965 | 30,000 | Multi Purpose |
| Denmark (list) | Copenhagen | Brøndbyhallen | 1973 | 4,500 | KIF Kolding-København |
| Denmark (list) | Copenhagen | Frederiksberghallen | | 1,800 | København Håndbold |
| Denmark (list) | Copenhagen | Forum Copenhagen | 1926 | 10,000 | Multi Purpose, Junior Eurovision Song Contest 2003, Congratulations Show (Eurovision) |
| Denmark (list) | Copenhagen | Royal Arena | 2017 | 16,000 | Multi Purpose |
| Denmark (list) | Copenhagen | Valby-Hallen | 1984 | 5,000 | Multi Purpose |
| Denmark (list) | Esbjerg | Blue Water Dokken | 2012 | 2,546 | Team Esbjerg |
| Denmark (list) | Esbjerg | Granly Hockey Arena | 1974 | 4,200 | Esbjerg IK |
| Denmark (list) | Fredericia | Fredericia Idrætscenter | | 2,225 | Fredericia HK |
| Denmark (list) | Haderslev | Syd Energi Arena | 2011 | 5,000 | SønderjyskE Ishockey |
| Denmark (list) | Helsinge | Helsinge-Hallen | | 1,600 | Nordsjælland Håndbold |
| Denmark (list) | Herning | Jyske Bank Boxen | 2010 | 15,000 | Concerts, sports |
| Denmark (list) | Herning | M Hall | 2003 | 9,100 | Concerts, sports, business receptions |
| Denmark (list) | Holstebro | Gråkjær Arena | 2011 | 3,250 | Team Tvis Holstebro |
| Denmark (list) | Holstebro | Idrætscenter Vest | | 2,300 | Team Tvis Holstebro |
| Denmark (list) | Horsens | Horsens Forum | | 5,000 | Horsens HK |
| Denmark (list) | Ikast | Ikast-Brande Arena | | 2,850 | Ikast-Brande Elite Håndbold |
| Denmark (list) | Lemvig | Vestjysk Bank Arena | | 1,400 | Lemvig-Thyborøn Håndbold |
| Denmark (list) | Kolding | Sydbank Arena | 2015 | 5,001 | KIF Kolding-København |
| Denmark (list) | Nykøbing Falster | Power Arena | | 1,300 | Nykøbing Falster Håndboldklub |
| Denmark (list) | Odense | Arena Fyn | 2007 | 5,500 | HC Odense |
| Denmark (list) | Randers | Randers Arena | 1952 | 3,500 | Randers HK |
| Denmark (list) | Ringsted | Ringsted Hallen | 1997 | 1,600 | TMS Ringsted |
| Denmark (list) | Ringkøbing | Rofi Centre | | 1,100 | Ringkøbing Håndbold |
| Denmark (list) | Roskilde | Roskilde Hallerne | | 3,000 | Roskilde Håndbold |
| Denmark (list) | Silkeborg | Jysk Arena | | 3,000 | Bjerringbro Silkeborg |
| Denmark (list) | Skjern | Skjern Bank Arena | | 3,100 | Skjern Håndbold |
| Denmark (list) | Sønderborg | Broager Sparekasse Skansen | 2012 | 2,000 | SønderjyskE |
| Denmark (list) | Viborg | Vibocold Arena | | 3,000 | Viborg HK |
| Estonia (list) | Narva | Narva Ice Hall | 2003 | 1,500 | Narva PSK |
| Estonia (list) | Pärnu | Pärnu Sports Hall | 2009 | 1,820 | KK Pärnu |
| Estonia (list) | Rakvere | Rakvere Sports Hall | 2004 | 3,500 | Rakvere Tarvas |
| Estonia (list) | Rapla | Sadolin Sports Hall | 2010 | 1,000 | Rapla KK |
| Estonia (list) | Tallinn | Audentes Sports Centre | | 1,030 | Audentes/Noortekoondis |
| Estonia (list) | Tallinn | Kalev Sports Hall | 1962 | 1,780 | Basketball |
| Estonia (list) | Tallinn | Saku Suurhall | 2001 | 10,500 | Concerts, basketball, fairs, ice hockey, Eurovision Song Contest 2002 |
| Estonia (list) | Tallinn | Tondiraba Ice Hall | 2014 | 7,700 | Figure skating, ice hockey, basketball |
| Estonia (list) | Tallinn | TalTech Sports Hall | 1975 | 1,000 | Basketball |
| Estonia (list) | Tartu | University of Tartu Sports Hall | 1982 | 2,000 | Basketball |
| Finland (list) | Espoo | Espoo Metro Areena | 1999 | 8,582 | Ice hockey |
| Finland (list) | Forssa | Forssa Ice Hall | 1998 | 3,000 | Forssan Palloseura |
| Finland (list) | Forssa | Feeniks Sports Hall | 1990 | 1,080 | Basketball |
| Finland (list) | Hämeenlinna | Ritari Areena | 1979 | 5,360 | Ice hockey |
| Finland (list) | Heinola | Versowood Arena | 1984 | 2,975 | Peliitat Heinola |
| Finland (list) | Helsinki | Hartwall Arena | 1997 | 15,000 | Jokerit (ice hockey) and concerts, Eurovision Song Contest 2007 |
| Finland (list) | Helsinki | Helsinki Ice Hall | 1966 | 8,200 | HIFK (ice hockey) |
| Finland (list) | Helsinki | Töölö Sports Hall | 1935 | 2,000 | Torpan Pojat |
| Finland (list) | Joensuu | Mehtimäki Ice Hall | 1982 | 4,800 | Jokipojat |
| Finland (list) | Jyväskylä | Synergia Areena | 1982 | 4,628 | Ice hockey |
| Finland (list) | Kajaani | Kajaanin Jäähalli | 1989 | 2,372 | Hokki |
| Finland (list) | Kerava | Keravan Jäähalli | 1987 | 1,500 | HC Keski-Uusimaa |
| Finland (list) | Kokkola | Kokkolan Jäähalli | 1988 | 5,500 | Kokkolan Hermes |
| Finland (list) | Kouvola | Lumon Arena | 1982 | 6,200 | KooKoo |
| Finland (list) | Kuopio | Kuopio Ice Hall | 1979 | 5,064 | Ice hockey |
| Finland (list) | Lahti | Isku Areena | 1973 | 5,530 | Ice hockey |
| Finland (list) | Lappeenranta | Kisapuisto | 1972 | 4,847 | Ice hockey |
| Finland (list) | Lempäälä | Masku Areena | 1995 | 900 | LeKi |
| Finland (list) | Mikkeli | Kalevankankaan Jäähalli | 1982 | 4,487 | Jukurit |
| Finland (list) | Oulu | Oulun Energia Areena | 1975 | 6,614 | Ice hockey |
| Finland (list) | Pori | Porin jäähalli | 1971 | 6,500 | Ice hockey |
| Finland (list) | Rovaniemi | Lappi Areena | 2003 | 5,500 | Ice hockey |
| Finland (list) | Rauma | Äijänsuo Arena | 1970 | 5,400 | Ice hockey |
| Finland (list) | Savonlinna | Talvisalo ice rink | 1979 | 2,833 | SaPKo |
| Finland (list) | Tampere | Tampere Ice Stadium | 1965 | 7,300 | Ice hockey |
| Finland (list) | Tampere | Tampere Sports Centre | 1985 | 10,800 | |
| Finland (list) | Tampere | Tampere Deck Arena | 2021 | 13,455 | |
| Finland (list) | Turku | Gatorade Center | 1990 | 11,820 | Ice hockey and concerts |
| Finland (list) | Turku | Kupittaan jäähalli | 1973 | 3,000 | TuTo |
| Finland (list) | Uusikaupunki | Pohitullin Sports Hall | 1981 | 1,627 | Korihait |
| Finland (list) | Vaasa | Vaasa Arena | 1971 | 4,448 | Vaasan Sport |
| Finland (list) | Vantaa | Energia Areena | 2006 | 3,500 | Finnish national basketball team |
| France (list) | Aix-en-Provence | Aréna du Pays d'Aix | 2017 | 7000 | Pays d'Aix Université Club |
| France (list) | Albertville | Halle Olympique | 1991 | 5,500 | 1992 Winter Olympics |
| France (list) | Amiens | Amiens Coliséum | 1996 | 2,882 | Gothiques d'Amiens |
| France (list) | Antibes | Azur Arena | 2013 | 5,249 | |
| France (list) | Besançon | Palais des sports Ghani-Yalouz | | 4,000 | Besançon Basket Comté Doubs |
| France (list) | Brest | Brest Arena | 2014 | 6,000 | Brest Bretagne Handball |
| France (list) | Brest | Salle Marcel Cerdan | | 2,000 | Étendard de Brest |
| France (list) | Bordeaux | Bordeaux Métropole Arena | 2018 | 11,300 | |
| France (list) | Bordeaux | Patinoire de Mériadeck | 1981 | 4,800 | |
| France (list) | Bordeaux | Vélodrome de Bordeaux | 1989 | 4,560 | 1998 UCI Track Cycling World Championships |
| France (list) | Boulazac | Le Pailio | 2008 | 5,200 | |
| France (list) | Bourg-en-Bresse | Salle des Sports | | 2,300 | Jeunesse Laïque de Bourg-en-Bresse |
| France (list) | Briançon | Patinoire René Froger | 1968 | 2,150 | Diables Rouges de Briançon |
| France (list) | Caen | Patinoire de Caen la mer | 1971 | 1,499 | Drakkars de Caen |
| France (list) | Chalon-sur-Saône | Le Colisée | 2001 | 5,000 | Élan Chalon |
| France (list) | Chambéry | Le Phare | 2009 | 6,200 | Chambéry Savoie Handball |
| France (list) | Chamonix | Centre Sportif Richard Bozon | 1971 | 1,700 | Chamonix Hockey Club |
| France (list) | Cholet | La Meilleraie | 1987 | 5,191 | Cholet Basket |
| France (list) | Clermont-Ferrand | Clermont-Ferrand Sports Hall | | 5,000 | Stade Clermontois BA |
| France (list) | Dijon | Palais des sports | 2010 | 4,628 | Jeanne d'Arc Dijon Bourgogne |
| France (list) | Dunkirk | Stade des Flandres | | 2,500 | Dunkerque Handball Grand Littoral |
| France (list) | Gap | Patinoire Brown-Ferrand | 1955 | 1,800 | |
| France (list) | Gravelines | Gravelines Sportica | | 3,500 | BCM Gravelines Dunkerque |
| France (list) | Grenoble | Palais des Sports | 1967 | 12,000 | Six-day racing |
| France (list) | Grenoble | Patinoire Polesud | 2001 | 3,496 | Brûleurs de Loups |
| France (list) | Hyères | Espace 3000 | | 2,500 | Hyères-Toulon Var Basket |
| France (list) | Le Havre | Dock Océane | | 3,598 | Saint Thomas Basket Le Havre |
| France (list) | Le Mans | Antarès | 1995 | 6,023 | Le Mans Sarthe Basket |
| France (list) | Levallois | Palais des sports Marcel-Cerdan | 1992 | 4,000 | Levallois Metropolitans |
| France (list) | Liévin | Stade Couvert Régional | | 12,000 | 1987 European Athletics Indoor Championships |
| France (list) | Lille | Zénith de Lille | 1994 | 7,000 | |
| France (list) | Limoges | Palais des Sports | 1981 | 6,500 | CSP Limoges |
| France (list) | Lyon | Palais des Sports de Gerland | 1962 | 5,910 | 2006 European Figure Skating Championships |
| France (list) | Lyon | Halle Tony Garnier | 1988 | 17,000 | |
| France (list) | Marseille | Palais des Sports | 1988 | 5,800 | Open 13 |
| France (list) | Méribel | Méribel Ice Palace | 1991 | 2,400 | 1992 Winter Olympics |
| France (list) | Metz | Arènes de Metz | 2002 | 4,500 | Metz Handball |
| France (list) | Montbéliard | Axone | 2009 | 6,400 | |
| France (list) | Montpellier | Sud de France Arena | 2010 | 14,000 | Montpellier Agglomération Handball |
| France (list) | Nancy | Palais des Sports Jean Weille | 1999 | 6,027 | SLUC Nancy Basket |
| France (list) | Nanterre | Palais des Sports Maurice Thorez | 2015 | 3,000 | Nanterre 92 |
| France (list) | Nanterre | Paris La Défense Arena | 2017 | 40,000 (concerts); 30,680 (sports) | |
| France (list) | Nantes | Hall XXL | 2013 | 10,750 | HBC Nantes |
| France (list) | Nantes | Zénith Nantes Métropole | 1984 | 8,500 | |
| France (list) | Nantes | Palais des Sports | 1973 | 5,500 | |
| France (list) | Orléans | Palais des Sports | | 3,222 | Orléans Loiret Basket |
| France (list) | Orléans | Zénith d'Orléans | 1996 | 6,900 | Entente Orléanaise |
| France (list) | Paris | AccorHotels Arena | 1984 | 20,300 | |
| France (list) | Paris | Halle Georges Carpentier | 1960 | 5,009 | Nanterre 92 |
| France (list) | Paris | Adidas Arena | 2024 | 9,000 (concerts); 8,000 (sports) | |
| France (list) | Paris | Le Zénith | 1984 | 9,000 | |
| France (list) | Paris | Palais des Sports | 1960 | 4,600 | |
| France (list) | Paris | Palais des Sports Robert Oubron | | 2,500 | US Créteil Handball |
| France (list) | Paris | Stade Pierre de Coubertin | 1937 | 4,836 | Levallois Metropolitans |
| France (list) | Pau | Palais des Sports de Pau | 1991 | 7,707 | ÉB Pau-Lacq-Orthez |
| France (list) | Pralognan-la-Vanoise | Patinoire olympique de Pralognan-la-Vanoise | | 2,300 | 1992 Winter Olympics |
| France (list) | Reims | Complex Sportif René Tys | | 3,000 | Reims Champagne Basket |
| France (list) | Roanne | Halle André Vacheresse | | 5,000 | Chorale Roanne Basket |
| France (list) | Rouen | Île Lacroix | 1992 | 2,747 | Dragons de Rouen |
| France (list) | Rouen | Kindarena (Palais des sports de Rouen) | 2012 | 6,000 | |
| France (list) | Strasbourg | Patinoire Iceberg | 2005 | 2,400 | Étoile Noire de Strasbourg |
| France (list) | Strasbourg | Rhénus Sport | | 6,200 | Strasbourg IG |
| France (list) | Strasbourg | Zénith de Strasbourg | 2008 | 12,079 | |
| France (list) | Trélazé | Trélazé Arena | 2013 | 6,600 | |
| France (list) | Toulon | Palais des Sports de Toulon | | 4,200 | Hyères-Toulon Var Basket |
| France (list) | Vichy | Gymnase Pierre Coulon | | 3,300 | JA Vichy |
| France (list) | Villeurbanne | L'Astroballe | 1995 | 5,556 | ASVEL Basket |
| Georgia | Tbilisi | Tbilisi Sports Palace | 1961 | 11,000 | Georgia national basketball team |
| Georgia | Tbilisi | Olympic Palace | 2015 | 10,000 | Junior Eurovision Song Contest 2017 |
| Georgia | Shekvetili | Black Sea Arena | 2016 | 10,000 | Concerts |
| Germany (list) | Aschaffenburg | Unterfrankenhalle | 1991 | 5,000 | TV Grosswallstadt |
| Germany (list) | Augsburg | Curt Frenzel Stadium | | 6,218 | Augsburger Panther |
| Germany (list) | Bamberg | Brose Arena | 2001 | 8,000 | Brose Baskets |
| Germany (list) | Bayreuth | Kunsteisstadion | 1976 | 4,730 | Bayreuth Tigers |
| Germany (list) | Bayreuth | Oberfrankenhalle | 1988 | 6,100 | medi Bayreuth |
| Germany (list) | Berlin | Max-Schmeling-Halle | 1996 | 12,000 | Füchse Berlin HBC |
| Germany (list) | Berlin | Mercedes-Benz Arena | 2008 | 17,000 | ALBA Berlin (basketball), Eisbären Berlin (hockey) |
| Germany (list) | Berlin | Treptow Arena | | 7,500 | |
| Germany (list) | Berlin | Velodrom | 1999 | 12,000 | |
| Germany (list) | Berlin | Wellblechpalast | 1963 | 4,695 | |
| Germany (list) | Bietigheim-Bissingen | EgeTrans Arena | 2012 | 4,517 | SG BBM Bietigheim |
| Germany (list) | Bonn | Hardtberghalle | | 3,500 | |
| Germany (list) | Bonn | Telekom Dome | 2008 | 6,000 | Telekom Baskets Bonn |
| Germany (list) | Braunschweig | Volkswagen Halle | 2000 | 8,000 | Phantoms Braunschweig |
| Germany (list) | Bremen | ÖVB Arena | 1964 | 14,500 | |
| Germany (list) | Bremerhaven | Bremerhaven Stadthalle | 1974 | 6,000 | Eisbären Bremerhaven |
| Germany (list) | Chemnitz | Eissportzentrum Chemnitz | 1958 | 3,978 | |
| Germany (list) | Cologne | Eis-und Schwimmstadion | 1936 | 7,200 | |
| Germany (list) | Cologne | GEW Energy Dome | | 3,232 | Köln 99ers |
| Germany (list) | Cologne | Lanxess Arena | 1998 | 20,000 | Kölner Haie, VfL Gummersbach |
| Germany (list) | Crimmitschau | Eisstadion im Sahnpark | 1964 | 5,222 | ETC Crimmitschau |
| Germany (list) | Dessau | Anhalt Arena | | 3,200 | Dessau-Roßlauer HV 2006 |
| Germany (list) | Dortmund | Eissportzentrum | 1952 | 5,000 | EHC Dortmund |
| Germany (list) | Dortmund | Westfalenhalle | 1952 | 16,500 | |
| Germany (list) | Dresden | EnergieVerbund Arena | 2007 | 6,500 | Dresdner Eislöwen |
| Germany (list) | Dresden | Messehalle | | 12,000 | |
| Germany (list) | Duisburg | Kenston Arena | 1970 | 4,800 | Füchse Duisburg |
| Germany (list) | Düsseldorf | Eisstadion an der Brehmstraße | 1935 | 10,285 | DEG Youngsters |
| Germany (list) | Düsseldorf | PSD Bank Dome | 2006 | 15,151 | DEG Metro Stars |
| Germany (list) | Düsseldorf | Mitsubishi Electric Halle | 1971 | 7,500 | RheinEnergie Köln |
| Germany (list) | Eppelheim | Rhein-Neckar-Halle | 1970 | 8,000 | |
| Germany (list) | Erfurt | Messe Erfurt | | 12,000 | Rockets (basketball club) |
| Germany (list) | Essen | Grugahalle | 1958 | 10,000 | |
| Germany (list) | Essen | Sportpark am Hallo | | 2,500 | |
| Germany (list) | Flensburg | Flens Arena | 2001 | 6,000 | SG Flensburg-Handewitt |
| Germany (list) | Frankfurt | Eissporthalle Frankfurt | 1981 | 6,946 | Frankfurt Lions |
| Germany (list) | Frankfurt | Festhalle Frankfurt | 1909 | 13,500 | |
| Germany (list) | Frankfurt | Fraport Arena | 1988 | 5,002 | Skyliners Frankfurt |
| Germany (list) | Freiburg | Franz Siegel Stadion | 1969 | 5,800 | Wölfe Freiburg |
| Germany (list) | Garmisch-Partenkirchen | Garmisch Olympia Stadium | 1935 | 6,929 | SC Riessersee |
| Germany (list) | Gelsenkirchen | Emscher-Lippe-Halle | 1984 | 2,600 | EHC Gelsenkirchen |
| Germany (list) | Giessen | Sporthalle Gießen-Ost | | 4,003 | Giessen 46ers |
| Germany (list) | Göppingen | EWS Arena | 1967 | 6,344 | Frisch Auf Göppingen |
| Germany (list) | Hamburg | Alsterdorfer Sporthalle | 1968 | 7,000 | HSV Hamburg |
| Germany (list) | Hamburg | Barclays Arena | 2002 | 16,000 | HSV Hamburg, Hamburg Freezers |
| Germany (list) | Hanover | Eisstadion am Pferdeturm | 1959 | 4,608 | Hanover Indians |
| Germany (list) | Hanover | Swiss Life Hall | | 5,500 | |
| Germany (list) | Hanover | ZAG-Arena | 2000 | 14,000 | Hanover Scorpions |
| Germany (list) | Heilbronn | Kolbenschmidt Arena | 2002 | 4,000 | Heilbronner Falken |
| Germany (list) | Ingolstadt | Saturn Arena | 2003 | 4,815 | ERC Ingolstadt |
| Germany (list) | Iserlohn | Eissporthalle Iserlohn | 1971 | 4,999 | Iserlohn Roosters |
| Germany (list) | Jena | Sparkassen Arena | 2014 | 3,000 | Science City Jena |
| Germany (list) | Karlsruhe | Dm-Arena | 2003 | 14,000 | |
| Germany (list) | Karlsruhe | Europahalle | 1983 | 9,000 | BG Karlsruhe, Rhein-Neckar Löwen |
| Germany (list) | Kassel | Eissporthalle Kassel | 1977 | 6,100 | Kassel Huskies |
| Germany (list) | Kiel | Sparkassen-Arena | 1951 | 13,500 | THW Kiel |
| Germany (list) | Krefeld | Yayla Arena | 2004 | 9,000 | Krefeld Pinguine |
| Germany (list) | Krefeld | Rheinlandhalle | 1955 | 6,714 | EHC Preussen Krefeld |
| Germany (list) | Landshut | Eisstadion am Gutenbergweg | 1957 | 7,000 | Landshut Cannibals |
| Germany (list) | Leipzig | Arena Leipzig | 2002 | 12,000 | HC Leipzig |
| Germany (list) | Lemgo | Lipperlandhalle | 1977 | 5,000 | TBV Lemgo |
| Germany (list) | Leutershausen | Heinrich Beck Halle | | 1,200 | |
| Germany (list) | Leverkusen | Smidt Arena | 1974 | 3,500 | Bayer Giants Leverkusen |
| Germany (list) | Ludwigsburg | Arena Ludwigsburg | 2009 | 7,201 | EnBW Ludwigsburg |
| Germany (list) | Ludwigsburg | Rundsporthalle | | 3,008 | |
| Germany (list) | Ludwigshafen | Fredrich-Ebert-Halle | 1965 | 2,250 | |
| Germany (list) | Magdeburg | GETEC Arena | 1997 | 8,820 | SC Magdeburg |
| Germany (list) | Mannheim | Eisstadion am Friedrichspark | 1939 | 2,500 | Jungadler Mannheim |
| Germany (list) | Mannheim | SAP Arena | 2005 | 15,000 | Adler Mannheim |
| Germany (list) | Munich | Audi Dome | 1972 | 7,200 | FC Bayern Munich |
| Germany (list) | Munich | Olympia Eishalle | 1967 | 6,256 | EHC München |
| Germany (list) | Munich | Olympiahalle | 1972 | 15,500 | |
| Germany (list) | Münster | Halle Münsterland | | 7,000 | |
| Germany (list) | Neu-Ulm | Ratiopharm Arena | 2011 | 6,100 | Ratiopharm Ulm |
| Germany (list) | Nordhausen | Wiedigsburghalle | | 2,018 | Thüringer HC |
| Germany (list) | Nuremberg | Arena Nürnberger Versicherung | 2001 | 11,000 | HC Erlangen |
| Germany (list) | Nuremberg | Frankenhalle | 1984 | 5,000 | |
| Germany (list) | Oberhausen | König Pilsener Arena | 1998 | 12,650 | Revierlöwen Oberhausen |
| Germany (list) | Oldenburg | EWE Arena | 2013 | 8,000 | EWE Baskets Oldenburg |
| Germany (list) | Oldenburg | Kleine EWE Arena | 2005 | 4,100 | |
| Germany (list) | Oldenburg | Weser-Ems Halle | 1954 | 10,000 | EWE Baskets Oldenburg |
| Germany (list) | Osnabruck | Artland Arena | 2003 | 3,200 | Artland Dragons |
| Germany (list) | Paderborn | Sportzentrum Maspernplatz | | 3,040 | Paderborn Baskets |
| Germany (list) | Recklinghausen | Vestlandhalle | 1957 | 2,500 | |
| Germany (list) | Regensburg | Donau Arena | 1999 | 7,600 | EV Regensburg |
| Germany (list) | Riesa | Sachsen Arena | 2004 | 5,500 | World Dance Championships |
| Germany (list) | Rosenheim | Kathrein-Stadion | 1973 | 6,200 | Starbulls Rosenheim |
| Germany (list) | Schwerin | Sport und Kongresshalle | 1962 | 8,000 | SV Post Schwerin |
| Germany (list) | Sindelfingen | Glaspalast Sindelfingen | 1977 | 5,250 | 1980 European Athletics Indoor Championships |
| Germany (list) | Straubing | Eisstadion am Pulverturm | 1967 | 6,000 | Straubing Tigers |
| Germany (list) | Stuttgart | Hanns-Martin-Schleyer-Halle | 1983 | 15,500 | |
| Germany (list) | Stuttgart | Porsche Arena | 2006 | 7,849 | Porsche Tennis Grand Prix |
| Germany (list) | Trier | Trier Arena | 2003 | 5,495 | TBB Trier |
| Germany (list) | Tübingen | Paul Horn Arena | | 3,132 | Walter Tigers Tübingen |
| Germany (list) | Vechta | Rasta Dome | 2012 | 3,140 | SC Rasta Vechta |
| Germany (list) | Villingen-Schwenningen | Helios Arena | 1976 | 6,215 | Schwenninger Wild Wings |
| Germany (list) | Weißwasser | Eisstadion Weißwasser | 1973 | 2,750 | Lausitzer Füchse |
| Germany (list) | Wetzlar | Rittal Arena | 2005 | 5,000 | HSG Wetzlar |
| Germany (list) | Wolfsburg | Eis Arena | 2006 | 4,660 | EHC Wolfsburg Grizzly Adams |
| Germany (list) | Wuppertal | Uni-Halle | | 4,100 | Bergischer HC |
| Germany (list) | Würzburg | S. Oliver Arena | 1981 | 4,756 | s.Oliver Baskets |
| Germany (list) | Zwickau | Stadthalle | 2000 | 7,000 | |
| Greece (list) | Amaliada | Amaliada Indoor Hall | 1987 | 2,000 | Koroivos BC |
| Greece (list) | Athens; Piraeus | Ano Liosia Olympic Hall | 2004 | 9,300 | |
| Greece (list) | Athens; Piraeus | Athens Olympic Tennis Centre | 2004 | 8,600 | 2004 Summer Olympics |
| Greece (list) | Athens; Piraeus | Faliro Arena | 2004 | 3,836 | 2004 Summer Olympics |
| Greece (list) | Athens; Piraeus | Galatsi Olympic Hall | 2004 | 6,200 | 2004 Summer Olympics |
| Greece (list) | Athens; Piraeus | Giannakopoulos Indoor Hall | 1959 | 2,000 | Panathinaikos women's basketball |
| Greece (list) | Athens; Piraeus | Glyfada Indoor Hall | 1970 | 3,500 | Panionios BC, Panathinaikos VC, Ikaros Esperos BC |
| Greece (list) | Athens; Piraeus | Hellinikon Fencing Hall | 2004 | 5,000 | 2004 Summer Olympics |
| Greece (list) | Athens; Piraeus | Helliniko Olympic Arena | 2004 | 15,000 | AEK Athens B.C., Olympiacos BC |
| Greece (list) | Athens; Piraeus | Korydallos Sports Hall | 1994 | 3,000 | |
| Greece (list) | Athens; Piraeus | Maroussi Indoor Hall | 1998 | 2,000 | Maroussi BC |
| Greece (list) | Athens; Piraeus | Michalis Mouroutsos Indoor Hall | 1992 | 1,200 | Amyntas BC |
| Greece (list) | Athens; Piraeus | Milon Indoor Hall | 1968 | 1,200 | Milon BC |
| Greece (list) | Athens; Piraeus | OAKA Indoor Hall | 1995 | 19,250 | Panathinaikos BC, Eurovision Song Contest 2006 |
| Greece (list) | Athens; Piraeus | Panellinios Indoor Hall | 1976 | 1,800 | Panellinios BC |
| Greece (list) | Athens; Piraeus | Peristeri Arena | 1989 | 4,000 | Peristeri BC |
| Greece (list) | Athens; Piraeus | Peristeri Olympic Boxing Hall | 2004 | 2,305 | 2004 Summer Olympics |
| Greece (list) | Athens; Piraeus | Sporting Sports Arena | 1968 | 2,500 | AO Sporting |
| Greece (list) | Athens; Piraeus | Zofria Indoor Hall | 1998 | 3,000 | 2000 CEV Cup |
| Greece (list) | Athens; Piraeus | Peace and Friendship Stadium | 1985 | 14,940 | Olympiacos |
| Greece (list) | Chalcis | Tasos Kambouris Indoor Hall | 1996 | 1,620 | Kymis BC |
| Greece (list) | Chania | Chania Kladissos Indoor Hall | 2005 | 3,000 | 2017 FIBA Europe Under-20 Championship |
| Greece (list) | Drama | Dimitris Krachtidis Indoor Hall | 1997 | 1,700 | |
| Greece (list) | Heraklion | Heraklion Indoor Sports Arena | 2007 | 5,398 | Irakleio BC |
| Greece (list) | Heraklion | Lido Indoor Hall | 1986 | 1,400 | Ergotelis BC |
| Greece (list) | Heraklion | TEI Indoor Sports Hall | 2004 | 2,400 | Women's FIBA Diamond Ball |
| Greece (list) | Kavala | Kalamitsa Indoor Hall | | 1,650 | Kavala BC |
| Greece (list) | Kozani | Lefkovrisi Indoor Hall | 2014 | 5,000 | |
| Greece (list) | Lamia | Chalkiopoulio Sports Hall | 1995 | 5,000 | |
| Greece (list) | Larissa | Larissa Neapolis Arena | 1995 | 6,500 | GS Larissas |
| Greece (list) | Patras | Apollon Patras Indoor Hall | 1992 | 3,500 | Apollon Patras |
| Greece (list) | Patras | Dimitris Tofalos Arena | 1995 | 5,150 | Promitheas Patras BC |
| Greece (list) | Rethymno | Melina Merkouri Indoor Hall | 1992 | 1,600 | Rethymno BC |
| Greece (list) | Rhodes | Venetokleio Indoor Hall | 1997 | 1,700 | Kolossos Rodou BC |
| Greece (list) | Thessaloniki | Alexandrio Melathron | 1966 | 6,000 | Aris BC |
| Greece (list) | Thessaloniki | Evosmos Sports Hall | | 3,000 | |
| Greece (list) | Thessaloniki | Ivanofeio Sports Arena | 1987 | 2,443 | Iraklis Thessaloniki BC |
| Greece (list) | Thessaloniki | Mikra Arena | 2008 | 1,800 | |
| Greece (list) | Thessaloniki | PAOK Sports Arena | 2000 | 10,200 | PAOK Thessaloniki B.C., PAOK Thessaloniki V.C. |
| Greece (list) | Trikala | Trikala Indoor Hall | 1985 | 2,500 | Aries Trikala BC |
| Greece (list) | Xanthi | Xanthi Arena | 2000 | 5,000 | APS Aspida Xanthi |
| Hungary (list) | Baja | MNÁMK Sportcsarnok | | 1,250 | Bajai Bácska FKE |
| Hungary (list) | Békéscsaba | Municipal Sports Hall | 1988 | 2,300 | Békéscsabai Előre NKSE |
| Hungary (list) | Budapest | MVM Dome | 2021 | 20,022 | Hungary men's national handball team Hungary women's national handball team |
| Hungary (list) | Budapest | BOK Hall | 2006 | 10,000 | |
| Hungary (list) | Budapest | Budapest Sports Arena | 2003 | 12,500 | Hungary men's national ice hockey team |
| Hungary (list) | Budapest | Circuit Hall | 1975 | 2,550 | |
| Hungary (list) | Budapest | Elek Gyula Arena | 1997 | 1,300 | Ferencvárosi TC |
| Hungary (list) | Budapest | National Sports Hall | 1941 | 1,900 | |
| Hungary (list) | Budapest | János Simon Basketball Arena | | 1,200 | Budapesti Honvéd SE |
| Hungary (list) | Budapest | Pestszentimrei Sportkastély | 2006 | 1,100 | PLER KC |
| Hungary (list) | Budapest | Sport11 | 2013 | 1,000 | |
| Hungary (list) | Budapest | Sportmax2 | 2008 | 1,475 | |
| Hungary (list) | Budapest | Tüskecsarnok | 2014 | 3,908 | MAC Budapest |
| Hungary (list) | Budapest | Városi Sportcsarnok | 2010 | 1,000 | Budaörs KC |
| Hungary (list) | Cegléd | Gál János Sportcsarnok | 1983 | 1,200 | Ceglédi KKSE |
| Hungary (list) | Dabas | OBO Arena | 2004 | 2,500 | Dabas VSE KC |
| Hungary (list) | Debrecen | Főnix Hall | 2002 | 8,500 | 2002 World Artistic Gymnastics Championships |
| Hungary (list) | Debrecen | Hódos Imre Sportcsarnok | 1976 | 1,800 | DVSC-TVP |
| Hungary (list) | Debrecen | Oláh Gábor Sportcsarnok | 1978 | 1,490 | Factum Sport Debrecen |
| Hungary (list) | Dunaújváros | Dunaújváros Sportcsarnok | 1973 | 1,200 | Dunaferr SE |
| Hungary (list) | Érd | Erd Arena | 2013 | 2,200 | ÉRD |
| Hungary (list) | Gyöngyös | Városi Sportcsarnok | | 1,500 | Gyöngyösi KK |
| Hungary (list) | Győr | Audi Arena | 2014 | 5,500 | 2014 European Women's Handball Championship |
| Hungary (list) | Győr | Győr Városi Egyetemi Csarnok | 2002 | 3,636 | Győri KC |
| Hungary (list) | Győr | Magvassy Mihály Sportcsarnok | 1976 | 2,800 | Győri ETO KC |
| Hungary (list) | Hódmezővásárhely | Hódtói Sportcsarnok | 1993 | 1,500 | Vásárhelyi KS |
| Hungary (list) | Kaposvár | Kaposvári Sportközpont | 1983 | 1,500 | Kaposvári KK |
| Hungary (list) | Kecskemét | Messzi István Sportcsarnok | 1970 | 1,600 | KTE-Duna Aszfalt |
| Hungary (list) | Kiskunfélegyháza | KESZ Arena | 2005 | 1,500 | Kiskunfélegyházi KC |
| Hungary (list) | Körmend | Városi Sportcsarnok | | 2,000 | BC Körmend |
| Hungary (list) | Miskolc | Generali Arena | 1970 | 1,688 | Aluinvent-DVTK |
| Hungary (list) | Miskolc | Miskolc Ice Hall | 2006 | 2,200 | Miskolci JJSE |
| Hungary (list) | Nyíregyháza | Bujtosi Szabadidő Csarnok | 1988 | 2,500 | Fatum-Nyíregyháza |
| Hungary (list) | Oroszlány | András Sportcsarnok | 2016 | 1,465 | |
| Hungary (list) | Ózd | Városi Sportcsarnok | | 1,000 | Ózdi KC |
| Hungary (list) | Paks | ASE Sportcsarnok | 1986 | 1,520 | Atomerőmű SE |
| Hungary (list) | Pápa | Városi Sportcsarnok | 1999 | 1,600 | Pápai KC |
| Hungary (list) | Pécs | Lauber Dezső Sports Hall | 1976 | 3,000 | PEAC-Pécs |
| Hungary (list) | Salgótarján | Városi Sportcsarnok | 1976 | 1,763 | Salgótarjáni KSE |
| Hungary (list) | Sopron | Sopron Arena | 1987 | 2,500 | UNIQA Sopron |
| Hungary (list) | Szeged | Újszegedi Sportcsarnok | 1974 | 3,200 | MOL-Pick Szeged |
| Hungary (list) | Székesfehérvár | Alba Regia Sportcsarnok | 1978 | 5,000 | FIBA Europe Cup |
| Hungary (list) | Székesfehérvár | Ifjabb Ocskay Gábor Ice Hall | 1991 | 3,500 | Fehérvár AV19 |
| Hungary (list) | Székesfehérvár | Köfém Sportcsarnok | | 1,000 | Fehérvár KC |
| Hungary (list) | Szekszárd | Városi Sportközpont | 1989 | 1,100 | Szekszárdi FGKC |
| Hungary (list) | Szigetszentmiklós | Városi Sportcsarnok | 2012 | 3,000 | Szigetszentmiklósi KSK |
| Hungary (list) | Szolnok | Tiszaligeti Sportcsarnok | 1975 | 2,200 | Szolnoki Olaj KK |
| Hungary (list) | Szombathely | Savaria Arena | 2006 | 8,000 | Falco KC Szombathely |
| Hungary (list) | Tatabánya | Imre Foldi Sports Hall | 1976 | 1,250 | Tatabánya KC |
| Hungary (list) | Veszprém | Március Sportcsarnok | | 2,200 | Veszprém Barabás KC |
| Hungary (list) | Veszprém | Veszprem Arena | 2008 | 6,000 | MKB Veszprém KC |
| Hungary (list) | Zalaegerszeg | Városi Sportcsarnok | 1980 | 2,500 | ZTE KK |
| Iceland | Hafnarfjörður | Ásvellir | 2000 | 2,120 | Haukar Basketball |
| Iceland | Reykjavík | Egilshöll | 2002 | 8,000 | |
| Iceland | Reykjavík | Laugardalshöll | 1965 | 11,000 | Iceland men's national handball team |
| Ireland | Dublin | 3Arena | 2008 | 13,000 | |
| Ireland | Dublin | National Basketball Arena | 1993 | 2,500 | |
| Ireland | Dublin | National Stadium | 1939 | 2,080 | |
| Ireland | Millstreet | Green Glens Arena | 1989 | 8,000 | Eurovision Song Contest 1993 |
| Ireland | Killarney | Gleneagle Arena | 2000 | 4,142 | |
| Italy (list) | Ancona | Banca Marche Palace | 2005 | 6,500 | 2010 FIVB Men's World Championship |
| Italy (list) | Avellino | Palasport Del Mauro | | 5,300 | Air Avellino |
| Italy (list) | Bergamo | PalaNorda | 1965 | 2,250 | Volley Bergamo Foppapedretti |
| Italy (list) | Biella | Biella Forum | 2009 | 5,707 | Pallacanestro Biella |
| Italy (list) | Biella | Palasport Biella | 1993 | 3,508 | |
| Italy (list) | Bologna | Land Rover Arena | 1957 | 5,721 | Amori Bologna |
| Italy (list) | Bologna | Unipol Arena | 1993 | 18,000 | Canadian Solar Bologna |
| Italy (list) | Bolzano | Sparkasse Arena | 1993 | 7,200 | HC Bolzano |
| Italy (list) | Brescia | PalaLeonessa | 2018 | 5,200 | Basket Brescia Leonessa |
| Italy (list) | Brindisi | PalaEilo | 1981 | 3,534 | New Basket Brindisi |
| Italy (list) | Canazei | Stadio del Ghiaccio Gianmario Scola | | 3,500 | Sportiva Hockey Club Fassa |
| Italy (list) | Cantù | Palasport Pianella | 1974 | 3,910 | Pallacanestro Cantù |
| Italy (list) | Caserta | PalaMaggio | 1982 | 6,387 | Juvecaserta Basket |
| Italy (list) | Catania | PalaCatania | 1995 | 5,000 | 2010 FIVB Men's World Championship |
| Italy (list) | Catania | PalaNesima | 1990 | 6,000 | 12th FINA Short Course Swimming World Championship |
| Italy (list) | Cesena | Carisport | 1985 | 3,608 | |
| Italy (list) | Cremona | Palasport Mario Radi | 1980 | 3,519 | Vanoli Cremona |
| Italy (list) | Desio | PalaBanco di Desio | 1992 | 8,000 | Pallacanestro Cantù |
| Italy (list) | Eboli | PalaSele | | 8,000 | |
| Italy (list) | Florence | Nelson Mandela Forum | 1985 | 8,262 | Il Bisonte Firenze |
| Italy (list) | Forlì | Unieuro Arena | 1987 | 7,500 | Pallacanestro Forlì 2.015 |
| Italy (list) | Genoa | 105 Stadium | | 5,500 | |
| Italy (list) | Genoa | Palasport di Genova | 1962 | 10,000 | 1992 European Athletics Indoor Championships |
| Italy (list) | Jesi | UBI Sports Center | 1992 | 3,500 | Aurora Basket Jesi |
| Italy (list) | Livorno | Modigliani Forum | 2004 | 8,033 | Basket Livorno |
| Italy (list) | Messina | PalaFantozzi | 2001 | 3,613 | Orlandina Basket |
| Italy (list) | Milan | Agora Ice Stadium | 1987 | 4,000 | Hockey Milano Rossoblu |
| Italy (list) | Milan | Mediolanum Forum | 1990 | 12,700 | AJ Milano |
| Italy (list) | Milan | PalaLido | 1961 | 5,420 | Olimpia Milano |
| Italy (list) | Modena | PalaPanini | 1985 | 4,968 | Modena Volley |
| Italy (list) | Montichiari | PalaGeorge | 1993 | 5,500 | Brescia Leonessa |
| Italy (list) | Monza | Candy Arena | 2003 | 4,500 | Volley Milano, US ProVictoria Monza |
| Italy (list) | Naples | PalaArgento | 1963 | 8,000 | |
| Italy (list) | Naples | PalaEldo | 2003 | 5,500 | Martos Napoli |
| Italy (list) | Padua | Kioene Arena | 1980 | 3,916 | Pallavolo Padova |
| Italy (list) | Pesaro | Adriatic Arena | 1996 | 13,000 | Scavolini Pesaro |
| Italy (list) | Pistoia | PalaFermi | 1988 | 4,000 | Pistoia Basket 2000 |
| Italy (list) | Porto San Giorgio | PalaSavelli | | 3,800 | Sutor Basket Montegranaro |
| Italy (list) | Reggio Calabria | PalaCalafiore | 1991 | 8,500 | Viola Reggio Calabria |
| Italy (list) | Reggio Emilia | PalaBigi | 1968 | 4,600 | Pallacanestro Reggiana |
| Italy (list) | Rieti | PalaSojourner | 1974 | 3,550 | N.P.C. Rieti |
| Italy (list) | Rome | PalaLottomatica | 1960 | 11,200 | Lottomatica Roma |
| Italy (list) | Rome | Palazzetto dello Sport | 1957 | 3,500 | M. Roma Volley |
| Italy (list) | Sassari | PalaSerradimingi | 1981 | 5,000 | Dinamo Basket Sassari |
| Italy (list) | Scafati | PalaMangano | | 3,700 | Scafati Basket |
| Italy (list) | Siena | Palasport Mens Sana | 1976 | 7,050 | Montepaschi Siena |
| Italy (list) | Teramo | PalaScapirano | 1980 | 3,500 | |
| Italy (list) | Turin | Oval Lingotto | 2005 | 8,500 | 2006 Winter Olympics |
| Italy (list) | Turin | Pala Alpitour | 2005 | 16,600 | 2006 Winter Olympics |
| Italy (list) | Turin | PalaRuffini | 1961 | 4,500 | Auxilium Pallacanestro Torino |
| Italy (list) | Turin | Palavela | 1961 | 12,000 | 2006 Winter Olympics |
| Italy (list) | Turin | Pinerolo Palaghiaccio | | 2,000 | 2006 Winter Olympics |
| Italy (list) | Trento | BLM Group Arena | 2000 | 4,360 | Trentino Volley |
| Italy (list) | Treviso | Palaverde | 1983 | 6,000 | Benetton Basket Bwin, Sisley Volley |
| Italy (list) | Trieste | Allianz Dome | 1999 | 6,943 | Alma Pallacanestro Trieste |
| Italy (list) | Udine | Palasport Primo Carnera | 1970 | 3,850 | Pallalcesto Amatori Udine |
| Italy (list) | Varese | PalA2A | 1964 | 5,300 | Pallacanestro Varese |
| Italy (list) | Venice | Palasport Giuseppe Taliercio | 1978 | 3,509 | Reyer Venezia Mestre |
| Italy (list) | Verona | PalaOlimpia | | 5,350 | Scaligera Verona |
| Kosovo (list) | Ferizaj | Bill Clinton Hall | | 2,000 | KB Kastrioti |
| Kosovo (list) | Gjakova | Shani Nushi Hall | | 2,000 | KB Vllaznimi |
| Kosovo (list) | Gjilan | Bahkim Selishta Hall | | 1,700 | KB Drita |
| Kosovo (list) | Glogovac | Glogovac Sports Hall | 2014 | 1,400 | KB Drenasi |
| Kosovo (list) | Gračanica | Gracanica City Arena | 2017 | 2,000 | |
| Kosovo (list) | Klina | Adem Jashari Arena | 2016 | 2,000 | KB Klina |
| Kosovo (list) | Malisheva | Habib Zogaj Gym | 2012 | 2,100 | KB Malisheva |
| Kosovo (list) | Mitrovica | Minatori Sports Hall | 1984 | 2,500 | KB Trepça |
| Kosovo (list) | Obiliq | Adem Jashari Hall | 2014 | 1,200 | KB AS Kastrioti |
| Kosovo (list) | Peć | Karagac Sports Hall | | 2,000 | KB Peja |
| Kosovo (list) | Pristina | 1 Tetori | | 2,000 | |
| Kosovo (list) | Pristina | Palace of Youth and Sports | 1977 | 8,000 | Sigal Prishtina |
| Kosovo (list) | Prizren | Sezair Surroi Arena | | 2,500 | Bashkimi Prizren |
| Kosovo (list) | Suva Reka | 13 Qershori | 2005 | 1,800 | KB Ylli |
| Kosovo (list) | Vushtrri | Jeton Terstena Hall | 1963 | 1,200 | KB Kosova |
| Latvia (list) | Riga | Riga Arena | 2006 | 14,500 | 2006 Men's World Ice Hockey Championships, Dinamo Riga, Barons LMT |
| Latvia (list) | Riga | Skonto Hall | 1996 | 6,500 | 2006 Men's World Ice Hockey Championships, Eurovision Song Contest 2003 |
| Latvia (list) | Riga | Inbox.lv ledus halle | 2002 | 2,000 | Ice hockey |
| Latvia (list) | Ventspils | Ventspils Olympic Center Basketball Hall | 1997 | 3,085 | BK Ventspils |
| Lithuania (list) | Alytus | Alytus Arena | 2011 | 7,000 | EuroBasket 2011, BC Alytus |
| Lithuania (list) | Elektrėnai | Elektrėnai Ice Palace | 1977 | 2,000 | SC Energija |
| Lithuania (list) | Jonava | Jonava Arena | 2017 | 2,800 | BC Petrochema |
| Lithuania (list) | Kaunas | Garliava Arena | 2011 | 1,800 | |
| Lithuania (list) | Kaunas | Kaunas Sports Hall | 1939 | 5,000 | |
| Lithuania (list) | Kaunas | Žalgiris Arena | 2011 | 20,000 | EuroBasket 2011, BC Žalgiris |
| Lithuania (list) | Kėdainiai | Kėdainiai Arena | 2013 | 3,000 | BC Nevėžis |
| Lithuania (list) | Klaipėda | Švyturys Arena | 2011 | 7,500 | EuroBasket 2011, BC Neptūnas |
| Lithuania (list) | Marijampolė | ARVI Football Indoor Arena | 2008 | 2,660 | Football (FK Sūduva Marijampolė) |
| Lithuania (list) | Mažeikiai | Mažeikiai Ice Arena | | 4,000 | |
| Lithuania (list) | Palanga | Palanga Arena | 2014 | 1,100 | BC Palanga |
| Lithuania (list) | Panevėžys | Sports Palace Aukštaitija | | 2,000 | |
| Lithuania (list) | Panevėžys | Cido Arena | 2008 | 7,323 | EuroBasket 2011 |
| Lithuania (list) | Pasvalys | Pieno žvaigdžės Arena | 2011 | 1,500 | BC Pieno žvaigždės |
| Lithuania (list) | Prienai | Prienai Arena | 2011 | 1,800 | BC Prienai |
| Lithuania (list) | Šiauliai | Šiaulių arena | 2007 | 7,400 | EuroBasket 2011, BC Šiauliai |
| Lithuania (list) | Utena | Utena Arena | 2009 | 3,000 | BC Juventus |
| Lithuania (list) | Vilnius | Siemens Arena | 2004 | 12,500 | EuroBasket 2011, BC Lietuvos Rytas |
| Lithuania (list) | Vilnius | Forum Palace | 2003 | 1,600 | |
| Lithuania (list) | Vilnius | Lietuvos rytas Arena | 2005 | 2,500 | BC Lietuvos Rytas |
| Lithuania (list) | Vilnius | Sportima Arena | 2001 | 3,157 | |
| Lithuania (list) | Vilnius | Pramogų arena | 2002 | 4,000 | 2009 European Wrestling Championships |
| Lithuania (list) | Vilnius | Ūkio banko teatro arena | | 2,000 | |
| Lithuania (list) | Vilnius | Vilnius Palace of Concerts and Sports | 1971 | 4,400 | |
| Luxembourg | Luxembourg City | D'coque | 1982 | 8,300 | |
| Moldova | Chișinău | Manej Sport Arena | 1993 | 2,361 | |
| Moldova | Chișinău | Arena Chișinău | 2022 | 4,500 | |
| Montenegro | Podgorica | Morača Sports Center | 1978 | 4,000 | SUPERKOMBAT World Grand Prix I 2012 |
| Montenegro | Bar | Topolica Sport Hall | 2009 | 3,000 | KK Mornar Bar |
| Netherlands (list) | Alkmaar | Sportpaleis Alkmaar | 1964 | 4,750 | |
| Netherlands (list) | Almere | Topsportcentrum | 2007 | 3,000 | Almere Pioneers |
| Netherlands (list) | Amsterdam | Jaap Eden Hall | 1973 | 4,500 | Amsterdam G's |
| Netherlands (list) | Amsterdam | Ziggo Dome | 2012 | 17,000 | |
| Netherlands (list) | Apeldoorn | Omnisport Apeldoorn | 2008 | 5,000 | Cycling, volleyball, athletics |
| Netherlands (list) | Arnhem | Rijnhal | 1972 | 5,000 | |
| Netherlands (list) | Groningen | MartiniPlaza | 1969 | 4,500 | Basketball (Donar) |
| Netherlands (list) | Heerenveen | Thialf | 1986 | 12,500 | Speed skating, ice hockey, figure skating |
| Netherlands (list) | Leiden | Vijf Meihal | 1968 | 2,000 | ZZ Leiden |
| Netherlands (list) | Rotterdam | Rotterdam Ahoy | 1950 | 15,818 | Junior Eurovision Song Contest 2007, Eurovision Song Contest 2021 |
| Netherlands (list) | Rotterdam | Topsportcentrum | 2000 | 2,500 | Feyenoord Basketball |
| Netherlands (list) | 's-Hertogenbosch | Maaspoort | 1982 | 2,700 | Heroes Den Bosch |
| Netherlands (list) | Zoetermeer | PWA Silverdome | 2002 | 3,500 | Ice hockey |
| Netherlands (list) | Zwolle | Landstede Sportcentrum | 2010 | 1,200 | Landstede Hammers |
| North Macedonia (list) | Bitola | Mladost Sports Hall | 1975 | 5,000 | KK Pelister |
| North Macedonia (list) | Kavadarci | Jasmin Sports Hall | | 2,500 | KK Feni Industries |
| North Macedonia (list) | Kumanovo | Kumanovo Sports Hall | 1980 | 6,500 | KK Kumanovo |
| North Macedonia (list) | Skopje | Avtokomanda | | 2,000 | RK Metalurg |
| North Macedonia (list) | Skopje | Boris Trajkovski Sports Center | 2008 | 12,000 | |
| North Macedonia (list) | Skopje | Gradski Park Hall | 1970 | 2,500 | KK Rabotnički |
| North Macedonia (list) | Skopje | Jane Sandanski Arena | 2014 | 6,500 | |
| North Macedonia (list) | Skopje | Rasadnik Hall | | 1,500 | RK Vardar |
| North Macedonia (list) | Skopje | SRC Kale | | 3,500 | |
| North Macedonia (list) | Strumica | Park Sports Hall | 1981 | 2,300 | KK Strumica |
| North Macedonia (list) | Ohrid | Biljanini Izvori | 1998 | 4,500 | |
| North Macedonia (list) | Veles | 25 Maj Sports Hall | | 4,000 | RK Borec |
| Norway (list) (list of ice rinks) | Asker | Askerhallen | 1969 | 2,400 | Frisk Tigers |
| Norway (list) (list of ice rinks) | Bergen | Bergenshallen | 1968 | 3,000 | Bergen IK |
| Norway (list) (list of ice rinks) | Bergen | Fana Arena | 2018 | 1,206 | Fana Håndball |
| Norway (list) (list of ice rinks) | Bergen | Haukelandshallen | 1970 | 5,000 | |
| Norway (list) (list of ice rinks) | Bergen | Sotra Arena | 2013 | 4,000 | Sotra SK |
| Norway (list) (list of ice rinks) | Bergen | Vestlandshallen | | 9,000 | Sports, concerts |
| Norway (list) (list of ice rinks) | Bergen | Åsane Arena | 2020 | 2,220 | Tertnes HE |
| Norway (list) (list of ice rinks) | Bodø | Bodø Spektrum | 1991 | 5,500 | Football, handball |
| Norway (list) (list of ice rinks) | Drammen | Drammenshallen | 1978 | 6,000 | Drammen HK |
| Norway (list) (list of ice rinks) | Fredrikstad | Stjernehallen | 1970 | 2,473 | Stjernen Hockey |
| Norway (list) (list of ice rinks) | Gjøvik | Gjøvik Olympic Hall | 1993 | 5,830 | 1994 Winter Olympics |
| Norway (list) (list of ice rinks) | Halden | Halden Ishall | 1987 | 2,200 | Comet Halden |
| Norway (list) (list of ice rinks) | Hamar | CC Amfi | 1992 | 7,500 | 1994 Winter Olympics, Storhamar Dragons, Hamar IL |
| Norway (list) (list of ice rinks) | Hamar | Vikingskipet | 1992 | 20,000 | World Allround Speed Skating Championships, 1994 Winter Olympics |
| Norway (list) (list of ice rinks) | Kongsberg | Kongsberg Hallen | 1988 | 5,500 | Kongsberg IF |
| Norway (list) (list of ice rinks) | Kongsvinger | Kongsvinger Ishall | 1992 | 2,000 | Kongsvinger Knights |
| Norway (list) (list of ice rinks) | Larvik | Jotron Arena | 2009 | 4,000 | Larvik HK |
| Norway (list) (list of ice rinks) | Lillehammer | Håkons Hall | 1993 | 11,500 | 1994 Winter Olympics, Junior Eurovision Song Contest 2004 |
| Norway (list) (list of ice rinks) | Lillehammer | Kristins Hall | 1988 | 3,197 | Lillehammer IK |
| Norway (list) (list of ice rinks) | Lillestrøm | LSK-Hallen | | 3,000 | LSK Kvinner FK |
| Norway (list) (list of ice rinks) | Lørenskog | Lorenskog Ishall | 1988 | 2,450 | Lørenskog IK |
| Norway (list) (list of ice rinks) | Oslo | Furuset Forum | 1979 | 2,050 | Furuset Ishockey |
| Norway (list) (list of ice rinks) | Oslo | Lørenhallen | 1986 | 1,500 | Hasle–Løren |
| Norway (list) (list of ice rinks) | Oslo | Manglerudhallen | 1979 | 2,000 | Manglerud Star |
| Norway (list) (list of ice rinks) | Oslo | Oslo Spektrum | 1990 | 10,500 | Eurovision Song Contest 1996 |
| Norway (list) (list of ice rinks) | Oslo | Telenor Arena | 2009 | 23,000 | Eurovision Song Contest 2010 |
| Norway (list) (list of ice rinks) | Oslo | Vallhall Arena | | 12,500 | Vålerenga Fotball |
| Norway (list) (list of ice rinks) | Sarpsborg | Sparta Amfi | 1963 | 3,900 | Sparta Warriors |
| Norway (list) (list of ice rinks) | Skien | Skien Hallen | 2005 | 1,650 | Skien IK |
| Norway (list) (list of ice rinks) | Stavanger | DNB Arena | 2012 | 6,000 | Stavanger Oilers |
| Norway (list) (list of ice rinks) | Stavanger | Sørmarka Arena | 2010 | 4,000 | |
| Norway (list) (list of ice rinks) | Stavanger | Stavanger Idrettshall | 1979 | 4,100 | Handball |
| Norway (list) (list of ice rinks) | Stavanger | Stavanger Ishall | 1968 | 3,090 | Ice hockey |
| Norway (list) (list of ice rinks) | Trondheim | Trondheim Spektrum | 1963 | 12,000 | Byåsen HE |
| Norway (list) (list of ice rinks) | Trondheim | Dalgård Ishall | 1989 | 1,050 | Astor Hockey |
| Norway (list) (list of ice rinks) | Trondheim | Leangen Ishall | 1977 | 3,000 | Nidaros Hockey |
| Poland (list) | Bełchatów | Energia Hall | 2006 | 2,700 | PGE Skra Bełchatów |
| Poland (list) | Bielsko-Biała | Dębowiec Sports Arena | 2010 | 4,500 | BKS Stal Bielsko-Biała |
| Poland (list) | Bielsko-Biała | Hala BKS Stal | 1988 | 1,400 | BKS Stal Bielsko-Biała |
| Poland (list) | Bydgoszcz | Grupa Moderator Arena | 2014 | 1,470 | Astoria Bydgoszcz, Artego Bydgoszcz |
| Poland (list) | Bydgoszcz | Łuczniczka | 2002 | 8,764 | FIBA EuroBasket 2009, EuroBasket Women 2011 |
| Poland (list) | Chorzów | Hala MORiS | 1982 | 1,100 | Clearex Chorzów |
| Poland (list) | Częstochowa | Częstochowa Sports Hall | 2012 | 5,843 | |
| Poland (list) | Częstochowa | Hala Polonia | 1986 | 1,950 | AZS Częstochowa |
| Poland (list) | Dąbrowa Górnicza | Hala Sportowa Centrum | 2004 | 2,944 | MKS Dąbrowa Górnicza |
| Poland (list) | Elblag | Centrum Sportowo | 2006 | 2,500 | EB Start Elbląg |
| Poland (list) | Gdańsk | Ergo Arena | 2007 | 15,000 | 2013 Men's European Volleyball Championship, Trefl Sopot |
| Poland (list) | Gdańsk | Hala Olivia | 1972 | 5,500 | EuroBasket 2009 |
| Poland (list) | Gdynia | Gdynia Sports Arena | 2008 | 5,500 | Asseco Gdynia |
| Poland (list) | Gliwice | Gliwice Arena | 2018 | 17,178 | Junior Eurovision Song Contest 2019 |
| Poland (list) | Gorzów | Hala ZSTiO | 1979 | 1,100 | GTPS Gorzów Wielkopolski |
| Poland (list) | Jastrzębie-Zdrój | Hala Sportowa Jastrzębiu-Zdroju | 1971 | 3,000 | Jastrzębski Węgiel |
| Poland (list) | Kalisz | Kalisz Arena | 2006 | 3,164 | Calisia Kalisz |
| Poland (list) | Katowice | Spodek | 1971 | 11,500 | FIBA EuroBasket 2009, EuroBasket Women 2011 |
| Poland (list) | Kędzierzyn-Koźle | Azoty Hall | 2005 | 3,375 | ZAKSA Kędzierzyn-Koźle |
| Poland (list) | Kielce | Legionów Hall | 2006 | 4,200 | KS Vive Tauron Kielce |
| Poland (list) | Koszalin | Hala Sportowa Koszalinie | 2012 | 4,000 | AZS Koszalin |
| Poland (list) | Kraków | Tauron Arena | 2014 | 22,000 | 2014 FIVB Men's Volleyball World Championship, 2016 European Men's Handball Championship |
| Poland (list) | Legnica | Hala Dolnośląskich Olimpijczyków | 1985 | 1,000 | Miedź Legnica |
| Poland (list) | Łódź | Atlas Arena | 2009 | 13,805 | FIBA EuroBasket 2009, EuroBasket Women 2011, CEV Champions League |
| Poland (list) | Łódź | Hala MOSiR | 1957 | 6,710 | CEV Champions League: Final Four in 2008 |
| Poland (list) | Lublin | Globus Hall | 2008 | 4,119 | SPR Lublin |
| Poland (list) | Lublin | Hala RCS | | 3,714 | MKS Zagłębie Lubin |
| Poland (list) | Mielec | Mielec Sports Hall | 1963 | 2,200 | KPSK Stal Mielec |
| Poland (list) | Muszyna | Muszyna Sports Hall | | 1,200 | Muszynianka Muszyna |
| Poland (list) | Nowy Targ | Miejska Hala Lodowa | 1952 | 3,500 | Podhale Nowy Targ |
| Poland (list) | Olsztyn | Urania Hall | 1978 | 2,500 | Indykpol AZS Olsztyn |
| Poland (list) | Opole | Hala Gwardii | 1975 | 2,000 | Gwardia Opole |
| Poland (list) | Opole | Hala Okrąglak | 1968 | 4,000 | |
| Poland (list) | Ostrowiec | Hala KSZO | 2011 | 3,794 | AZS KSZO |
| Poland (list) | Płock | Orlen Arena | 2010 | 8,000 | Wisła Płock |
| Poland (list) | Poznań | HWS Arena | 1974 | 5,500 | EuroBasket 2009 |
| Poland (list) | Pruszków | BGZ Arena | 2008 | 1,800 | 2009 UCI Track Cycling World Championships |
| Poland (list) | Radom | MOSiR Sports Hall | 1996 | 2,500 | Czarni Radom |
| Poland (list) | Rzeszów | Podpromie Hall | 2002 | 4,304 | Asseco Resovia Rzeszów |
| Poland (list) | Sanok | Sanok Arena | 2006 | 3,000 | KH Sanok |
| Poland (list) | Slupsk | Hala Gryfia | 1982 | 2,500 | Czarni Słupsk |
| Poland (list) | Sopot | Hala Stulecia Sopotu | 2001 | 2,000 | Asseco Prokom Gdynia |
| Poland (list) | Szczecin | Azoty Arena | 2014 | 5,403 | Pogoń Szczecin |
| Poland (list) | Tarnów | Hala Unii | | 3,500 | Unia Tarnów |
| Poland (list) | Toruń | Hala Toruń | 2014 | 9,250 | Pierniki Toruń |
| Poland (list) | Toruń | Tor-Tor | 1960 | 2,997 | TKH Toruń |
| Poland (list) | Tychy | Tychach Sport Hall | 2008 | 1,250 | GKS Tychy |
| Poland (list) | Wałbrzych | Hala Sportowa Aqua Zdrój | 2013 | 3,000 | Górnik Wałbrzych |
| Poland (list) | Warsaw | Torwar Hall | 1953 | 8,000 | UHKS Mazowsze |
| Poland (list) | Warsaw | Ursynów Arena | 2000 | 2,000 | |
| Poland (list) | Włocławek | Hala Mistrzów | 2001 | 4,200 | WTK Anwil Włocławek |
| Poland (list) | Wrocław | Centennial Hall | 1913 | 11,000 | EuroBasket 1963, 2009 Women's European Volleyball Championship |
| Poland (list) | Wrocław | Hala Orbita | 2004 | 3,000 | Śląsk Wrocław |
| Poland (list) | Zabrze | Hala Sportowa Pogoń | | 1,777 | KS Górnik Zabrze |
| Poland (list) | Zgorzelec | Centrum Sportowe | 1986 | 1,300 | |
| Poland (list) | Zgorzelec | PGE Turow Arena | 2014 | 3,500 | Turów Zgorzelec |
| Poland (list) | Zielona Góra | CRS Hall | 2010 | 6,080 | Basket Zielona Góra |
| Portugal (list) | Braga | Braga Forum | 1981 | 12,000 | |
| Portugal (list) | Coimbra | Pavilhão Mário Mexia | 2003 | 2,239 | Académica de Coimbra |
| Portugal (list) | Funchal | Madeira Tecnopolo | | 2,500 | 2003 World Men's Handball Championship |
| Portugal (list) | Guimarães | Pavilhão Multiusos de Guimarães | 2001 | 10,000 | Vitória de Guimarães |
| Portugal (list) | Lisbon | Altice Arena | 1998 | 20,000 | Eurovision Song Contest 2018 |
| Portugal (list) | Lisbon | Campo Pequeno | 1892 | 10,000 | |
| Portugal (list) | Lisbon | Pavilhão da Luz Nº 2 | 2004 | 1,800 | Benfica |
| Portugal (list) | Lisbon | Pavilhão Fidelidade | 2004 | 2,400 | Benfica |
| Portugal (list) | Lisbon | Pavilhão João Rocha | 2017 | 3,000 | Sporting CP |
| Portugal (list) | Porto | Dragão Caixa | 2009 | 2,115 | FC Porto |
| Portugal (list) | Porto | Pavilhão Rosa Mota | 1954 | 5,400 | |
| Portugal (list) | Póvoa | Pavilhão Desportivo da Póvoa | 1998 | 2,500 | Portuguese volleyball team |
| Romania (list) | Bucharest | Dinamo Hall | 2008 | 2,538 | Dinamo Volley Romprest |
| Romania (list) | Bucharest | Mihai Flamaropol Skating Rink | | 8,000 | Steaua Rangers |
| Romania (list) | Bucharest | Palace Hall | 1960 | 4,060 | Concerts |
| Romania (list) | Bucharest | Polyvalent Hall | 1974 | 5,300 | |
| Romania (list) | Bucharest | Romexpo | 1962 | 40,000 | K-1 World Grand Prix |
| Romania (list) | Baia Mare | Lascăr Pană Sports Hall | 1974 | 2,048 | Minaur Baia Mare |
| Romania (list) | Brașov | Brasov Olympic Ice Rink | 2010 | 2,000 | Corona Brașov |
| Romania (list) | Brașov | Brașov Sports Hall | 1975 | 1,700 | Corona Brașov |
| Romania (list) | Călăraşi | Polyvalent Hall | 2011 | 2,500 | |
| Romania (list) | Cluj-Napoca | BT Arena | 2014 | 10,000 | FIBA Eurobasket 2017, European Artistic Gymnastics Championships 2017 |
| Romania (list) | Cluj-Napoca | Horia Demian Sports Hall | 1970 | 2,525 | CS Universitatea Cluj-Napoca |
| Romania (list) | Constanța | Sala Sporturilor Constanța | | 1,500 | CS Farul Constanța |
| Romania (list) | Craiova | Polyvalent Hall | 2012 | 4,215 | SCM Craiova |
| Romania (list) | Galaţi | Dunărea Sports Hall | 1973 | 1,500 | Danubius Galați |
| Romania (list) | Galaţi | Galaţi Skating Rink | 1970 | 5,000 | CSM Dunărea Galaţi |
| Romania (list) | Gheorgheni | Gheorgheni Skating Rink | | 2,000 | |
| Romania (list) | Miercurea Ciuc | Lajos Vakar Ice Hall | 1971 | 4,000 | HSC Csíkszereda |
| Romania (list) | Piatra Neamț | Polyvalent Hall | 2011 | 4,000 | Volei Club Unic Piatra Neamț |
| Romania (list) | Ploiești | Olimpia Sports Hall | 1972 | 3,500 | Tricolorul LMV Ploiești |
| Romania (list) | Oradea | Antonio Alexe Arena | 1970 | 2,500 | CSM Oradea |
| Romania (list) | Oradea | Bazinul Olimpic Ioan Alexandrescu | 2007 | 1,035 | CSM Digi Oradea |
| Romania (list) | Râmnicu Vâlcea | Traian Sports Hall | 1982 | 3,126 | CS Oltchim Râmnicu Vâlcea |
| Romania (list) | Sfântu Gheorghe | Sepsi Arena | 2017 | 3,000 | ACS Sepsi SIC |
| Romania (list) | Sibiu | Sala Transilvania | 1998 | 1,850 | CSU Sibiu |
| Romania (list) | Târgu Mureş | Sala Sporturilor | 1978 | 2,000 | BC Mureș |
| Romania (list) | Timișoara | Constantin Jude Hall | 1968 | 2,200 | BC Timișoara |
| Russia (list) | Balashikha | Balashikha Arena | 2007 | 6,000 | HC MVD Moscow Oblast |
| Russia (list) | Chekhov | Ice Hockey Center | | 3,300 | Vityaz Chekhov |
| Russia (list) | Chelyabinsk | Traktor Ice Arena | 2009 | 7,517 | Traktor Chelyabinsk |
| Russia (list) | Chelyabinsk | Yunost Sports Palace | 1967 | 3,500 | Chelmet Chelyabinsk |
| Russia (list) | Cherepovets | Almaz Sports Hall | | 3,500 | |
| Russia (list) | Cherepovets | Ice Palace | 2007 | 6,000 | |
| Russia (list) | Kaspiysk | Ali Aliyev Sports Complex | 2011 | 6,000 | 2018 European Wrestling Championships |
| Russia (list) | Kazan | Kazan Basket-Hall | 2003 | 8,000 | UNICS Kazan |
| Russia (list) | Kazan | Kazan Volleyball Centre | 2010 | 5,000 | Dinamo Kazan |
| Russia (list) | Kazan | TatNeft Arena | 2005 | 10,400 | Ak Bars Kazan |
| Russia (list) | Khabarovsk | Platinum Arena | 2003 | 7,100 | Amur Khabarovsk |
| Russia (list) | Khabarovsk | Arena Yerofey | 2013 | 10,000 | SKA-Neftyanik |
| Russia (list) | Khanty-Mansiysk | Ugra Arena | 2008 | 5,500 | Yugra Khanty-Mansiysk |
| Russia (list) | Khimki | Khimki Basketball Center | 1970 | 5,025 | Khimki Moscow Region |
| Russia (list) | Kolomna | Kolomna Ice Rink | 2006 | 6,150 | 2008 European Championships |
| Russia (list) | Krasnodar | Krasnodar Basket-Hall | 2011 | 7,500 | Lokomotiv Kuban |
| Russia (list) | Krasnodar | Olympus Arena | | 3,000 | Kuban Krasnodar |
| Russia (list) | Krasnoyarsk | Sever Arena | 2011 | 4,100 | BC Enisey |
| Russia (list) | Krasnoyarsk | Yarygin Sports Palace | 1981 | 5,000 | |
| Russia (list) | Krasnoyarsk | Yenisey Stadium | 2018 | 5,000 | Yenisey Krasnoyarsk (bandy club) |
| Russia (list) | Lyubertsy | Triumph Sports Palace | | 4,000 | Triumph Lyubertsy |
| Russia (list) | Magnitogorsk | Metallurg Arena | 2007 | 7,800 | Metallurg Magnitogorsk |
| Russia (list) | Magnitogorsk | Romazan Ice Palace | 1992 | 3,700 | |
| Russia (list) | Moscow | CSKA Ice Palace | 1964 | 5,600 | HC CSKA Moscow |
| Russia (list) | Moscow | CSKA Universal Sports Hall | 1979 | 5,500 | PBC CSKA Moscow |
| Russia (list) | Moscow | Druzhba Multipurpose Arena | 1979 | 3,500 | 1980 Summer Olympics |
| Russia (list) | Moscow | Dynamo Sports Hall | 1980 | 5,000 | 1980 Summer Olympics |
| Russia (list) | Moscow | Ice Palace Krylatskoye | 2004 | 8,000 | Dynamo Moscow (bandy club) |
| Russia (list) | Moscow | Krylatskoye Sports Palace | 2006 | 5,000 | MFC Dynamo Moscow |
| Russia (list) | Moscow | Luzhniki Palace of Sports | 1956 | 11,500 | |
| Russia (list) | Moscow | Luzhniki Small Sports Arena | 1956 | 8,700 | 1980 Summer Olympics |
| Russia (list) | Moscow | Megasport Arena | 2006 | 13,926 | CSKA Moscow |
| Russia (list) | Moscow | Mytishchi Arena | 2005 | 9,000 | Atlant Moscow Oblast |
| Russia (list) | Moscow | Olympic Stadium | 1980 | 35,000 | |
| Russia (list) | Moscow | Sokolniki Arena | 1956 | 5,000 | HC Spartak Moscow |
| Russia (list) | Moscow | Universal Sports Palace | 1980 | 5,670 | MHC Krylya Sovetov |
| Russia (list) | Moscow | VTB Ice Palace | 2015 | 14,000 | Dynamo Moscow |
| Russia (list) | Nizhnekamsk | Neftekhimik Ice Palace | 2005 | 5,500 | Neftekhimik Nizhnekamsk |
| Russia (list) | Nizhny Novgorod | Konovalenko Sports Palace | 1967 | 4,300 | |
| Russia (list) | Nizhny Novgorod | Trade Union Sports Palace | 1965 | 5,600 | Torpedo Nizhny Novgorod |
| Russia (list) | Novokuznetsk | Metallurgists Sports Palace | 1984 | 8,000 | Metallurg Novokuznetsk |
| Russia (list) | Novosibirsk | Ice Sports Palace Sibir | 1964 | 7,400 | HC Sibir Novosibirsk |
| Russia (list) | Omsk | Arena Omsk | 2007 | 11,000 | Avangard Omsk |
| Russia (list) | Omsk | Blinov Sports and Concerts Complex | 1986 | 5,500 | |
| Russia (list) | Perm | Universal Sports Palace Molot | 1966 | 7,000 | Molot-Prikamye Perm |
| Russia (list) | Podolsk | Vityaz Ice Palace | 2000 | 5,500 | |
| Russia (list) | Rostov | Rostov Palace of Sports | 1967 | 4,000 | Rostov-Don |
| Russia (list) | Saint Petersburg | Ice Palace | 2000 | 12,300 | 2000 IIHF World Championship |
| Russia (list) | Saint Petersburg | SCC Peterburgsky | 1980 | 20,000 | St. Petersburg Open |
| Russia (list) | Saint Petersburg | Sibur Arena | 2013 | 7,120 | BC Spartak St. Petersburg |
| Russia (list) | Saint Petersburg | Yubileyny Sports Palace | 1967 | 7,044 | |
| Russia (list) | Samara | MTL Arena | | 3,500 | BC Samara |
| Russia (list) | Saratov | Kristall Ice Sports Palace | 1969 | 6,100 | Kristall Saratov |
| Russia (list) | Sochi | Adler Arena | 2012 | 8,000 | 2014 Winter Olympics |
| Russia (list) | Sochi | Bolshoy Ice Dome | 2012 | 12,000 | HC Sochi |
| Russia (list) | Sochi | Ice Cube Curling Center | 2012 | 3,000 | 2014 Winter Olympics |
| Russia (list) | Sochi | Iceberg Skating Palace | 2012 | 12,000 | 2014 Winter Olympics |
| Russia (list) | Sochi | Shayba Arena | 2013 | 7,000 | 2014 Winter Olympics |
| Russia (list) | Tolyatti | Lada Arena | 2013 | 6,600 | Lada Togliatti |
| Russia (list) | Tyumen | Tyumen Sports Palace | | 3,500 | Rubin Tyumen |
| Russia (list) | Ufa | Ice Palace Salavat Yulaev | 1967 | 4,043 | Tolpar Ufa |
| Russia (list) | Ufa | Ufa Arena | 2007 | 8,250 | Salavat Yulaev Ufa |
| Russia (list) | Ulyanovsk | Volga-Sport-Arena | 2014 | 5,000 | Volga Ulyanovsk (bandy club) |
| Russia (list) | Vladivostok | Fetisov Arena | 2013 | 7,000 | Admiral Vladivostok |
| Russia (list) | Volgograd | Volgograd Sports Palace | 1975 | 3,700 | Krasny Oktyabr |
| Russia (list) | Yaroslavl | Arena 2000 | 2001 | 9,070 | Lokomotiv Yaroslavl |
| Russia (list) | Yekaterinburg | Yekaterinburg Sports Palace | 1970 | 5,500 | Avtomobilist Yekaterinburg |
| Serbia (list) | Aleksandrovac | Zupa Hall | | 1,500 | |
| Serbia (list) | Apatin | Apatin Hall | | 1,125 | |
| Serbia (list) | Aranđelovac | SRC Šumadija | 1980 | 2,000 | |
| Serbia (list) | Bačka Palanka | Tikvara Hall | | 1,200 | |
| Serbia (list) | Bajina Bašta | SRC Bajina Basta | | 1,050 | |
| Serbia (list) | Bečej | Mladost Sports Center | 1988 | 2,000 | |
| Serbia (list) | Belgrade | Banjica Sports Center | 1974 | 1,800 | |
| Serbia (list) | Belgrade | Kolubara Sports Center | 1978 | 1,700 | |
| Serbia (list) | Belgrade | Nikolic Hall | 1973 | 8,150 | KK Crvena zvezda, KK Partizan |
| Serbia (list) | Belgrade | Obrenovac Hall | 1982 | 1,500 | |
| Serbia (list) | Belgrade | Pionir Ice Hall | 1978 | 2,000 | HK Partizan |
| Serbia (list) | Belgrade | Pinki Hall | 1974 | 5,000 | KK Mladost Zemun |
| Serbia (list) | Belgrade | Rakovica Sports Center | | 1,000 | |
| Serbia (list) | Belgrade | SRC Ljubomir | | 1,620 | |
| Serbia (list) | Belgrade | Stark Arena | 2004 | 20,000-25,000 | Hosts some KK Crvena Zvezda matches. Eurovision Song Contest 2008 |
| Serbia (list) | Belgrade | Sumice Sports Center | 1974 | 2,000 | OKK Beograd |
| Serbia (list) | Belgrade | Vizura Sports Center | 2009 | 1,500 | KK Mladost Zemun |
| Serbia (list) | Belgrade | Železnik Hall | 1995 | 3,000 | Crvena zvezda |
| Serbia (list) | Belgrade | Žeravica Sports Hall | 1968 | 5,000-7,000 | KK Superfund |
| Serbia (list) | Beočin | Beočin Hall | 1991 | 1,000 | |
| Serbia (list) | Bor | Bor Sports Center | 1986 | 3,000 | |
| Serbia (list) | Čačak | Borac Hall | 1969 | 4,000 | KK Borac Čačak |
| Serbia (list) | Čačak | Mladost Sports Center | | 1,000 | |
| Serbia (list) | Dimitrovgrad | Dimitrovgrad Hall | 2012 | 1,000 | |
| Serbia (list) | Gornji Milanovac | Breza Hall | 2008 | 1,500 | |
| Serbia (list) | Jagodina | JASSA Sports Center | 1978 | 2,600 | KK Jagodina |
| Serbia (list) | Kladovo | SRC Jezero | 1996 | 1,800 | |
| Serbia (list) | Kragujevac | Jezero Hall | 1978 | 5,320 | KKK Radnički |
| Serbia (list) | Kraljevo | Kraljevo Sports Hall | 2015 | 3,000-6,000 | KK Sloga |
| Serbia (list) | Kruševac | Kruševac Sports Hall | 1977 | 2,500 | KK Napredak |
| Serbia (list) | Leskovac | SRC Dubocica | 1983 | 4,000 | KK Zdravlje |
| Serbia (list) | Loznica | Lagator Hall | 1984 | 2,236 | KK Loznica |
| Serbia (list) | Majdanpek | Majdanpek Sports Hall | | 1,500 | |
| Serbia (list) | Niš | Čair Sports Center | 1974 | 6,500 | KK Ergonom |
| Serbia (list) | Novi Pazar | Pendik Hall | 2012 | 1,500 | |
| Serbia (list) | Novi Sad | Futog Sports Hall | 2006 | 1,500 | |
| Serbia (list) | Novi Sad | Hram Hall | 2000 | 2,000 | RK Jugović |
| Serbia (list) | Novi Sad | Slana Sports Center | 2007 | 1,500 | |
| Serbia (list) | Novi Sad | Spens Sports Center | 1981 | 11,500 | KK Vojvodina |
| Serbia (list) | Pančevo | Strelište Sports Hall | 1980 | 1,100 | KK Tamiš |
| Serbia (list) | Požarevac | Požarevac Sports Center | 1983 | 2,506 | |
| Serbia (list) | Priboj | Priboj Sports Center | 1991 | 2,100 | |
| Serbia (list) | Prokuplje | Zoran Đinđić Hall | 2006 | 1,000 | |
| Serbia (list) | Raška | Raška Hall | 2008 | 2,000 | |
| Serbia (list) | Ruma | Ruma Sports Center | 1991 | 2,500 | |
| Serbia (list) | Šabac | Zorka Hall | 1976 | 2,300 | |
| Serbia (list) | Smederevo | Smederevo Hall | 2009 | 4,500 | KK Smederevo 1953 |
| Serbia (list) | Sombor | Mostonga Hall | 1981 | 1,500 | |
| Serbia (list) | Sremska Mitrovica | SPC Pinki | 1987 | 2,500 | |
| Serbia (list) | Stara Pazova | Stara Pazova Sports Center | | 1,000 | |
| Serbia (list) | Subotica | Dudova Sports Center | 1968 | 2,500 | |
| Serbia (list) | Užice | Veliki Park Hall | 1975 | 3,500 | KK Sloboda |
| Serbia (list) | Valjevo | Valjevo Sports Hall | 1972 | 2,500 | KK Metalac |
| Serbia (list) | Vranje | Vranje Hall | 1989 | 3,000 | |
| Serbia (list) | Vrbas | Vrbas Sports Hall | 1980 | 1,500 | |
| Serbia (list) | Vrnjačka Banja | Divac Sports Hall | 2008 | 1,300 | |
| Serbia (list) | Vršac | Millennium Centar | 2001 | 5,000 | KK Hemofarm |
| Serbia (list) | Zaječar | SRC Kraljevica | 1976 | 2,360 | RK Zaječar |
| Serbia (list) | Zrenjanin | Medison Hall | 2009 | 2,800 | KK Proleter |
| Slovakia (list) | Banská Bystrica | Banská Bystrica Ice Stadium | 1956 | 3,000 | HC 05 Banská Bystrica |
| Slovakia (list) | Bratislava | Aegon Arena | 2003 | 6,070 | 2005 Davis Cup |
| Slovakia (list) | Bratislava | Orange Arena | 1940 | 10,200 | HC Slovan Bratislava |
| Slovakia (list) | Kežmarok | Winter Sports Stadium | 1994 | 3,000 | MHK Kežmarok |
| Slovakia (list) | Košice | Steel Aréna | 2006 | 8,378 | HC Košice |
| Slovakia (list) | Liptovský Mikuláš | Liptovský Mikuláš Ice Stadium | 1949 | 3,680 | MHk 32 Liptovský Mikuláš |
| Slovakia (list) | Martin | Martin Ice Stadium | 1977 | 4,200 | MHC Martin |
| Slovakia (list) | Nitra | Nitra Arena | 1966 | 4,800 | HK Nitra |
| Slovakia (list) | Piešťany | Easton Arena | 1986 | 5,000 | ŠHK 37 Piešťany |
| Slovakia (list) | Poprad | Poprad Ice Stadium | 1973 | 4,500 | HK Poprad |
| Slovakia (list) | Prešov | City Hall Prešov | 1978 | 4,870 | HT Tatran Prešov |
| Slovakia (list) | Prievidza | Nike Arena | | 3,400 | BC Prievidza |
| Slovakia (list) | Púchov | Puchov Ice Stadium | | 1,400 | HK Orange 20 |
| Slovakia (list) | Skalica | Skalica Ice Stadium | 1969 | 4,100 | HK 36 Skalica |
| Slovakia (list) | Spiš | Spis Arena | 1982 | 5,503 | HK Spišská Nová Ves |
| Slovakia (list) | Trenčín | Demitra Ice Stadium | 1960 | 6,150 | Dukla Trenčín |
| Slovakia (list) | Žilina | Garmin Arena | 1945 | 6,200 | MsHK Žilina |
| Slovakia (list) | Zvolen | Zvolen Ice Stadium | 1969 | 7,038 | HKm Zvolen |
| Slovenia (list) | Celje | Golovec Hall | 1976 | 3,200 | ŽRK Celje |
| Slovenia (list) | Celje | Zlatorog Arena | 2003 | 5,191 | RK Celje |
| Slovenia (list) | Domžale | Komunalni center Hall | 1967 | 2,500 | Helios Suns |
| Slovenia (list) | Jesenice | Podmežakla Hall | 1978 | 4,500 | HDD Jesenice |
| Slovenia (list) | Koper | Arena Bonifika | 1999 | 3,000 | RD Koper 2013, KK Primorska |
| Slovenia (list) | Laško | Tri Lilije Hall | 1995 | 2,500 | KK Zlatorog Laško |
| Slovenia (list) | Ljubljana | Kodeljevo Hall | 1970 | 1,540 | KD Slovan, KK Slovan, RK Krim |
| Slovenia (list) | Ljubljana | Tivoli Hall | 1965 | 5,600 | HK Olimpija |
| Slovenia (list) | Ljubljana | Arena Stožice | 2010 | 12,480 | KK Olimpija |
| Slovenia (list) | Maribor | Tabor Hall | 1984 | 3,261 | OK Maribor, ŽKD Maribor, RK Maribor Branik, ŠD Brezje |
| Slovenia (list) | Maribor | Ljudski vrt Hall | 2006 | 2,100 | AKK Branik Maribor, OK Nova KBM Branik |
| Slovenia (list) | Velenje | Red Hall | 1975 | 2,500 | RK Gorenje Velenje, ŽRK Velenje |
| Spain (list) | Arnedo | Arnedo Arena | 2010 | 6,018 | |
| Spain (list) | Badalona | Palau Municipal d'Esports de Badalona | 1991 | 12,760 | 1992 Summer Olympics, Joventut Badalona |
| Spain (list) | Barcelona | Palau Blaugrana | 1971 | 7,585 | Regal FC Barcelona, 1992 Summer Olympics |
| Spain (list) | Barcelona | Palau dels Esports de Barcelona | 1955 | 3,500 | 1992 Summer Olympics |
| Spain (list) | Barcelona | Palau Sant Jordi | 1991 | 17,960 | 1992 Summer Olympics, 2003 and 2011 Euroleague Basketball Final Four |
| Spain (list) | Bilbao | Bilbao Arena | 2010 | 10,014 | Bilbao Basket |
| Spain (list) | Bilbao | Bizkaia Arena | 2004 | 26,000 | Bilbao Basket, 2014 FIBA World Championship |
| Spain (list) | Burgos | Burgos Coliseum | 1967 | 9,454 | CB Miraflores |
| Spain (list) | Coruña | Coruña Coliseum | 1991 | 11,000 | 2016 Copa del Rey de Baloncesto |
| Spain (list) | Ferrol | Polideportivo de A Malata | 1983 | 5,000 | Ferrol CB |
| Spain (list) | Las Palmas | Centro Insular de Deportes | 1988 | 5,200 | CB Islas Canarias |
| Spain (list) | Las Palmas | Gran Canaria Arena | 2014 | 9,870 | CB Gran Canaria |
| Spain (list) | Lleida | Pavelló Barris Nord | 2001 | 6,100 | Força Lleida |
| Spain (list) | Lugo | Pazo Provincial Dos Deportes | 1992 | 7,500 | CB Breogán |
| Spain (list) | León | Leon Arena | 1948 | 10,000 | |
| Spain (list) | Madrid | Palacio Vistalegre | 2000 | 14,000 | |
| Spain (list) | Madrid | WiZink Center | 1960 | 15,500 | EuroBasket 2007, 2014 FIBA World Championship |
| Spain (list) | Madrid | Madrid Arena | 2003 | 12,000 | WTA Tour Championships |
| Spain (list) | Málaga | Martin Carpena Arena | 1998 | 11,300 | Unicaja Málaga, 2014 FIBA World Championship |
| Spain (list) | Palma | Palma Arena | 2007 | 6,607 | Ícaro Alaró, Portol Palma Mallorca, track cycling |
| Spain (list) | Santander | Palacio de Deportes de Santander | 2000 | 6,000 | |
| Spain (list) | Torrejón de Ardoz | Pabellón Jorge Garbajosa | 1999 | 3,136 | Carnicer Torrejón, Inter Movistar |
| Spain (list) | Vitoria-Gasteiz | Fernando Buesa Arena | 1991 | 16,164 | Caja Laboral |
| Spain (list) | Zaragoza | Príncipe Felipe Arena | 1990 | 10,744 | CAI Zaragoza |
| Sweden (list) | Ängelholm | Catena Arena | 2008 | 6,310 | |
| Sweden (list) | Boden | Björknäshallen | 1965 | 4,000 (1000 seated) | |
| Sweden (list) | Edsbyn | Dina Arena | 2003 | 5,000 | |
| Sweden (list) | Gävle | Gavlerinken Arena | 2006 | 8,500 | 2007 Euro Hockey Tour |
| Sweden (list) | Gothenburg | Frölundaborg | 1967 | 7,670 | |
| Sweden (list) | Gothenburg | Gothenburg Convention Centre | 1918 (1984) | 8,800 | |
| Sweden (list) | Gothenburg | Lisebergshallen | 1982 | 7,000 | |
| Sweden (list) | Gothenburg | Scandinavium | 1971 | 14,000 (concerts); 12,044 (sports) | 2002 Men's World Ice Hockey Championships; 2008 World Figure Skating Championships; 2010 FINA World Masters Championships; 2013 European Athletics Indoor Championships; Eurovision Song Contest 1985 |
| Sweden (list) | Halmstad | Halmstad Arena | 2009 | 4,500 | |
| Sweden (list) | Helsingborg | Idrottens Hus | 1957 | 2,400 | Davis Cup |
| Sweden (list) | Helsingborg | Helsingborg Arena | 2012 | 5,000 | Davis Cup |
| Sweden (list) | Jönköping | Elmia Eventcenter | 1961 | 15,000 (concerts) | DreamHack International Demo Competition |
| Sweden (list) | Jönköping | Kinnarps Arena | 2000 | 7,038 | 2004 Men's Handball World Cup |
| Sweden (list) | Jönköping | Rosenlundshallen | 1958 | 5,000 | |
| Sweden (list) | Karlskoga | Nobelhallen | 1972 | 6,300 | |
| Sweden (list) | Karlskrona | Telenor Arena | 2006 | 5,000 | |
| Sweden (list) | Karlstad | Löfbergs Arena | 2000 | 10,000 | 2000 Karjala Ice Hockey Tournament, 2010 IIHF Men's InLine Hockey World Championship |
| Sweden (list) | Katrineholm | Woodyhallen | 2006 | 3,000 | |
| Sweden (list) | Kiruna | Arena Arctica | 2000 | 5,000 | |
| Sweden (list) | Kiruna | Lombiahallen | 1979 | 4,050 | |
| Sweden (list) | Kristianstad | Kristianstad Arena | 2009 | 5,000 | 2011 World Men's Handball Championships |
| Sweden (list) | Kristinehamn | Environiq Arena | 2007 | 10,000 (concerts) | |
| Sweden (list) | Leksand | Tegera Arena | 2005 | 7,650 | 2007 4 Nations Cup, 2007 World Junior Ice Hockey Championships |
| Sweden (list) | Luleå | Coop Norrbotten Arena | 2002 | 5,800 | 2003 EuroBasket Championships |
| Sweden (list) | Lidköping | Lidköping Arena | 2009 | 12,500 (concerts); 4,500 (bandy) | 2025 Women's Bandy World Championship, Division A of the 2025 Men's Bandy World Championship |
| Sweden (list) | Linköping | Saab Arena | 2004 | 8,500 | 2005 Women's World Ice Hockey Championships |
| Sweden (list) | Lund | FFS Arena | 2008 | 3,000 | 2011 World Men's Handball Championships |
| Sweden (list) | Malmö | Malmö Arena | 2008 | 15,500 (concerts); 12,600 (sports) | 2011 World Men's Handball Championship; 2014 IIHF World Junior Championships; Eurovision Song Contest 2013 |
| Sweden (list) | Malmö | Malmö Isstadion | 1970 | 5,800 | 2003 European Figure Skating Championships, Eurovision Song Contest 1992 |
| Sweden (list) | Malmö | Malmö Convention Centre | 1968 | 6,000 | |
| Sweden (list) | Malmö | Baltiska Hallen | 1964 | 4,000 | |
| Sweden (list) | Mora | FM Mattsson Arena | 2004 | 5,000 | 2007 World Junior Ice Hockey Championships |
| Sweden (list) | Norrköping | Himmelstalundshallen | 1977 | 5,000 | 2011 World Men's Handball Championships |
| Sweden (list) | Nybro | Liljas Arena | 1963 | 2,380 | |
| Sweden (list) | Nyköping | Nyköping Eventcenter | 2003 | 5,500 | |
| Sweden (list) | Örebro | Conventum Arena | 2008 | 5,000 | |
| Sweden (list) | Örnsköldsvik | Hägglunds Arena | 2006 | 7,600 | 2008 European Curling Championships |
| Sweden (list) | Örnsköldsvik | Kempehallen | 1964 | 5,200 | |
| Sweden (list) | Östersund | Jämtkraft Arena | 2007 | 5,000 | |
| Sweden (list) | Sandviken | Göransson Arena | 2009 | 10,000 (concerts) | |
| Sweden (list) | Skellefteå | Skellefteå Kraft Arena | 2007 | 6,001 | |
| Sweden (list) | Solna | Strawberry Arena | 2012 | 65,000 (concerts); 50,000 (sports) | Melodifestivalen finals (excluding 2021) |
| Sweden (list) | Södertälje | AXA Sports Center | 2005 | 7,250 | |
| Sweden (list) | Täljehallen | | 1984 | 12,500 (concerts) | |
| Sweden (list) | Stockholm | Annexet | 1985 | 6,000 | 2006 Men's World Floorball Championships |
| Sweden (list) | Stockholm | Avicii Arena (Globen) | 1989 | 16,000 (concerts); 13,850 (sports) | 1989 Men's European Volleyball Championship; 2002 European Men's Handball Championship; 2004 World Cup of Hockey; 2007 Monster Jam finals 2012 Men's World Ice Hockey Championships; 2013 Men's World Ice Hockey Championships; Eurovision Song Contest 2000 & 2016 |
| Sweden (list) | Stockholm | Hovet | 1955 | 8,300 | 2006 European Women's Handball Championships |
| Sweden (list) | Stockholm | Solnahallen | 1986 | 10,000 (concerts) | |
| Sweden (list) | Stockholm | Solnais | 1956 | 6,000 | |
| Sweden (list) | Stockholm | Stockholm Convention Centre | 1941 | 5,000 | Eurovision Song Contest 1975 |
| Sweden (list) | Stockholm | 3Arena | 2013 | 40,000 (concerts); 30,000 (sports) | |
| Sweden (list) | Timrå | E.ON Arena | 2003 | 6,000 | |
| Sweden (list) | Tingsryd | Dackehallen | 1969 | 4,200 | |
| Sweden (list) | Umeå | SkyCom Arena | 2001 | 6,000 | |
| Sweden (list) | Vänersborg | Arena Vänersborg | 2009 | 3,000 | 2019 Bandy World Championship |
| Sweden (list) | Västerås | Arena Nord | 2007 | 5,800 | 2009 Floorball World Championships |
| Sweden (list) | Västerås | Arena Syd | 2007 | 9,000 | Bandy World Championship 2009 |
| Sweden (list) | Växjö | Vida Arena | 2011 | 5,329 | Växjö Lakers, Melodifestivalen 2012 |
| Sweden (list) | Växjö | Växjö Ishall | 1970 | 4,015 | |
| Switzerland (list) | Växjö | Baar | Waldmannhalle | | |
| Switzerland (list) | Basel | St. Jakob Arena | 2002 | 6,330 | EHC Basel |
| Switzerland (list) | Basel | St. Jakobshalle | 1976 | 9,000 | Eurovision Song Contest 2025 |
| Switzerland (list) | Bern | Bern Arena | 1967 | 17,000 | |
| Switzerland (list) | Bienne | Bienne Eisstadion | 1973 | 7,000 | |
| Switzerland (list) | Chur | Hallenstadion | | 6,545 | |
| Switzerland (list) | Davos | Eisstadion Davos | 1979 | 7,080 | |
| Switzerland (list) | Geneva | Patinoire des Vernets | 1958 | 7,135 | |
| Switzerland (list) | Kreuzlingen | Bodensee Arena | 2000 | 4,000 | |
| Switzerland (list) | Lausanne | CIG de Malley | 1984 | 11,000 | |
| Switzerland (list) | Lausanne | Vaudoise Aréna | 2019 | 10,000 | |
| Switzerland (list) | Luzern | Swiss Life Arena | | 5,000 | |
| Switzerland (list) | Zurich | Eishalle Schluefweg | 1952 | 7,624 | |
| Switzerland (list) | Zurich | Hallenstadion | 1939 | 13,000 | |
| Turkey (List) | Ankara | ASKI Sport Hall | | 6,000 | |
| Turkey (List) | Ankara | Ankara Arena | 2010 | 13,000 | |
| Turkey (List) | Antalya | Antalya Arena | 2010 | 10,000 | |
| Turkey (List) | Bursa | Bursa Atatürk Sport Hall | 1973 | 5,000 | Tofaş S.K. |
| Turkey (List) | Istanbul | Abdi İpekçi Arena | 1989 | 12,500 | Galatasaray Medical Park (all matches); Beşiktaş Milangaz (European matches); Eurovision Song Contest 2004 |
| Turkey (List) | Istanbul | BJK Akatlar Arena | 2004 | 4,500 | Beşiktaş Milangaz |
| Turkey (List) | Istanbul | Sinan Erdem Dome | 2003 | 22,500 | Anadolu Efes |
| Turkey (List) | Istanbul | Ataköy Athletics Arena | 2012 | 7,450 | |
| Turkey (List) | Istanbul | Hamdi Akın Sports Hall | 2006 | 7,500 | |
| Turkey (List) | Istanbul | Ülker Sports Arena | 2011 | 13,800 | Fenerbahçe Ülker |
| Turkey (List) | Istanbul | Haldun Alagas Arena | 2000 | 3,500 | Tekelspor |
| Turkey (List) | Istanbul | Ayhan Şahenk Arena | 1995 | 3,500 | Anadolu Efes (some domestic matches) |
| Turkey (List) | Istanbul | TVF Burhan Felek Sport Hall | 2010 | 7,000 | |
| Turkey (List) | İzmir | Halkapınar Sport Hall | 2004 | 10,000 | |
| Turkey (List) | İzmir | Karşıyaka Arena | 2004 | 5,000 | Pınar Karşıyaka |
| Turkey (List) | Kayseri | Kadir Has Sport Hall | 2008 | 7,500 | |
| Turkey (List) | Samsun | Tekkeköy Yaşar Doğu Arena | 2013 | 7,500 | |
| Turkey (List) | Trabzon | Hayri Gür Arena | 2011 | 7,500 | |
| Ukraine | Kyiv | Palats Sportu | 1960 | 6,500 | Eurovision Song Contest 2005 |
| Ukraine | Mariupol | Sportkompleks Illichivets | 2007 | 12,000 | |
| United Kingdom (list) | Aberdeen | P&J Live | 2019 | 10,264 | BHGE Arena |
| United Kingdom (list) | Belfast | Odyssey Arena | 2000 | 14,000 | |
| United Kingdom (list) | Birmingham | Resorts World Arena | 1982 | 16,000 | |
| United Kingdom (list) | Birmingham | Arena Birmingham | 1991 | 15,800 | Eurovision Song Contest 1998 |
| United Kingdom (list) | Birmingham | International Convention Centre, Birmingham | 1990 | 8,000‡ | ‡ (Hall 3 has a capacity of 3,000) |
| United Kingdom (list) | Birmingham | O2 Academy Birmingham | 2009 | 3,000 | |
| United Kingdom (list) | Birmingham | Symphony Hall, Birmingham | 1991 | 2,500 | |
| United Kingdom (list) | Birmingham | Digbeth Institute | 2010 | 2,500 | |
| United Kingdom (list) | Bournemouth | Bournemouth International Centre | 1984 | 6,500 | |
| United Kingdom (list) | Brighton | The Brighton Centre | 1977 | 5,100 | |
| United Kingdom (list) | Cardiff | Motorpoint Arena Cardiff | 1993 | 7,500 | |
| United Kingdom (list) | Coventry | SkyDome Arena | 1999 | 7,000 | |
| United Kingdom (list) | Exeter | Westpoint Arena | 1995 | 7,500 | |
| United Kingdom (list) | Glasgow | Braehead Arena | 1999 | 6,500 | |
| United Kingdom (list) | Glasgow | SECC | 1985 | 12,900 | |
| United Kingdom (list) | Glasgow | OVO Hydro | 2013 | 18,000 | |
| United Kingdom (list) | Leeds | First Direct Arena | 2013 | 13,500 | |
| United Kingdom (list) | Liverpool | Liverpool Arena | 2008 | 12,000 | Eurovision Song Contest 2023 |
| United Kingdom (list) | London | Alexandra Palace | 1875 | 8,250 (Great Hall) | |
| United Kingdom (list) | London | Crystal Palace National Sports Centre | 1964 | 5,000 | |
| United Kingdom (list) | London | The Royal Albert Hall | 1871 | 5,544‡ | Eurovision Song Contest 1968 ‡ Originally 8000 but only 5,544 permitted due to modern health and safety rules |
| United Kingdom (list) | London | The O2 Arena in The O2 (formerly the Millennium Dome) | 2007 | 23,000 | Tied for the largest in Europe |
| United Kingdom (list) | London | Olympia | 1886 | 8,000 | |
| United Kingdom (list) | London | Wembley Arena | 1934 | 12,300 | |
| United Kingdom (list) | Manchester | Manchester Central (formerly GMEX) | 1986 | 12,500‡ | ‡ (seated and standing config) |
| United Kingdom (list) | Manchester | Manchester Arena | 1995 | 21,000 | |
| United Kingdom (list) | Manchester | Bolton Arena | 2001 | 6,000 | |
| United Kingdom (list) | Nottingham | National Ice Centre | 2000 | 10,000 | |
| United Kingdom (list) | Newcastle upon Tyne | Utilita Arena Newcastle | 1995 | 11,000 | |
| United Kingdom (list) | Plymouth | Plymouth Pavilions | 1991 | 4,000 | |
| United Kingdom (list) | Sheffield | Sheffield Arena | 1991 | 12,500 | |

== North America ==
| Country | Location | Arena | Date built | Capacity | Tenant/use |
|---|---|---|---|---|---|
| Costa Rica | San José | BN Arena | 2013 | 5,000 | |
| Costa Rica | San José | Gimnasio Nacional | 1960 | 4,000 | |
| Costa Rica | Heredia | Palacio de los Deportes | 1989 | 7,500 | |
| Cuba | Havana | Coliseo de la Ciudad Deportiva | 1957 | 9,000 | |
| Cuba | Santiago de Cuba | Sala Polivalente Alejandro Urgelles | 1991 | 5,000 | |
| Dominican Republic | Santo Domingo | Palacio de los Deportes Virgilio Travieso Soto | 1974 | 8,337 | |
| Dominican Republic | Santo Domingo | Coliseo Carlos Teo Cruz | 1996 | 6,000 | |
| Dominican Republic | Santo Domingo | Pabellón de Voleibol Gioriver Arias | 2003 | 4,000 | |
| Dominican Republic | Santiago de los Caballeros | Gran Arena del Cibao | 1978 | 9,000 | |
| Dominican Republic | Puerto Plata | Polideportivo Fabio Rafael González | 1997 | 5,300 | |
| Dominican Republic | La Romana | Polideportivo Eleoncio Mercedes | 1983 | 4,000 | |
| Dominican Republic | San Francisco de Macorís | Pabellón Mario Ortega | 1977 | 4,000 | |
| Dominican Republic | La Vega | Palacio de los Deportes Fernando Teruel | 1976 | 3,600 | |
| El Salvador | San Salvador | Gimnasio Nacional José Adolfo Pineda | 1956 | 12,500 | |
| El Salvador | San Salvador | Palacio de los Deportes Carlos "El Famoso" Hernández | 1980 | 8,000 | |
| Guatemala | Guatemala City | Domo Polideportivo | 2000 | 7,500 | |
| Guatemala | Guatemala City | Gimnasio Nacional Teodoro Palacios Flores | 1950 | 3,825 | |
| Honduras | Tegucigalpa | Coliseo de los Ingenieros | 1997 | 9,000 | |
| Honduras | San Pedro Sula | Gimnasio San Pedro Sula | 1997 | 4,000 | |
| Mexico (List) | Mexico City | Palacio de los Deportes | 1968 | 20,000 | |
| Mexico (List) | Mexico City | Arena Coliseo | 1943 | 5,550-9,550 | |
| Mexico (List) | Mexico City | Arena Mexico | 1956 | 16,500 | |
| Mexico (List) | Mexico City | Mexico City Arena | 2012 | 22,000 | |
| Mexico (List) | Mexico City | Gimnasio Olímpico Juan de la Barrera | 1968 | 5,500 | |
| Mexico (List) | San Luis Potosí | Arena Potosí | 2024 | 20,000 | |
| Mexico (List) | San Luis Potosí | El Domo | 2010 | 11,000 | |
| Mexico (List) | Guadalajara | Arena Guadalajara | 2025 | 20,000 | |
| Mexico (List) | Monterrey | Arena Monterrey | 2003 | 18,000 | |
| Mexico (List) | Tlajomulco de Zúñiga | Arena VFG | 2009 | 15,000 | |
| Mexico (List) | Zapopan | Auditorio Benito Juarez | 1970 | 12,000 | |
| Mexico (List) | Mérida | Foro GNP Seguros | 2014 | 12,000 | |
| Mexico (List) | Mérida | Poliforum Zamna | 1982 | 6,640 | |
| Mexico (List) | Puebla | Auditorio GNP Seguros | 2016 | 12,000 | |
| Mexico (List) | Chihuahua | Gimnasio Manuel Bernardo Aguirre | 1980 | 10,000 | |
| Mexico (List) | Ciudad Madero | Centro de Convenciones Ciudad Madero | 1985 | 10,000 | |
| Mexico (List) | Hermosillo | CUM Hermosillo | 1985 | 10,000 | |
| Mexico (List) | Mazatlán | CUM Mazatlán | 2015 | 10,000 | |
| Mexico (List) | Los Mochis | CUM Los Mochis | 2014 | 10,000 | |
| Mexico (List) | Torreón | Coliseo Centenario | 2008 | 10,000 | |
| Mexico (List) | Ciudad Obregón | CUM Ciudad Obregón | 2009 | 8,000 | |
| Mexico (List) | Ciudad Obregón | Arena ITSON | 2009 | 7,464 | |
| Mexico (List) | Guanajuato | Domo de la Feria | 1980 | 5,240 | Lechugueros de León basketball games, wrestling events, concerts, boxing events, Davis Cup |
| Cancún | Polifórum Benito Juárez | 2008 | 5,800 | | |
| Nicaragua | Managua | Polideportivo Alexis Argüello | 2017 | 8,000 | |
| Panama | Panama City | Roberto Durán Arena | 1970 | 8,417 | |
| Panama | Colón | Gimnasio Teofilo Brown | 1945 | 3,000 | |
| Panama | David | Centro Deportivo La Basita | 2022 | 2,000 | |
| Puerto Rico | Arecibo | Coliseo Manuel Iguina | 2004 | 10,000 | Capitanes de Arecibo |
| Puerto Rico | Bayamón | Coliseo Rubén Rodríguez | 1988 | 12,000 | Vaqueros de Bayamón |
| Puerto Rico | Caguas | Coliseo Héctor Solá Bezares | 1968 | 6,000 | Criollas de Caguas |
| Puerto Rico | Guaynabo | Coliseo Mario Morales | 1963 | 5,500 | Mets de Guaynabo |
| Puerto Rico | Isabela | Coliseo Jose "Buga" Abreu | 1996 | 5,000 | |
| Puerto Rico | Mayagüez | Palacio de Recreación y Deportes German Wilkins Vélez Ramírez | 1981 | 5,500 | Indios de Mayagüez |
| Puerto Rico | Mayagüez | Coliseo Rafael A. Mangual | 1974 | 4,500 | UPRM Tarzans |
| Puerto Rico | Ponce | Coliseo Juan Pachín Vicéns | 1972 | 12,000 | Leones de Ponce |
| Puerto Rico | San Germán | Coliseo Arquelio Torres Ramírez | 1985 | 5,000 | Atléticos de San Germán |
| Puerto Rico | San Juan | Coliseo Roberto Clemente | 1973 | 12,500 | Cangrejeros de Santurce |
| Puerto Rico | San Juan | Coliseo de Puerto Rico, José Miguel Agrelot | 2004 | 19,500 | |
| Puerto Rico | Quebradillas | Coliseo Raymond Dalmau | 2009 | 6,000 | Piratas de Quebradillas |
| US Virgin Islands | Saint Thomas | Sports and Fitness Center | | 3,500 | |

== Oceania ==
| Country | Location | Arena | Date built | Capacity | Tenant/use |
|---|---|---|---|---|---|
| Australia (list) | Adelaide | Adelaide Arena | 1992 | 7,800 | Adelaide 36ers |
| Australia (list) | Adelaide | Adelaide Entertainment Centre | 1991 | 11,000 | |
| Australia (list) | Adelaide | Netball SA Stadium | 2001 | 3,000 | Adelaide Thunderbirds |
| Australia (list) | Brisbane | Brisbane Convention & Exhibition Centre | 1995 | 4,000 | Queensland Firebirds |
| Australia (list) | Brisbane | Brisbane Entertainment Centre | 1986 | 13,500 | |
| Australia (list) | Brisbane | Chandler Arena | 1982 | 2,700 | |
| Australia (list) | Cairns | Cairns Convention Centre | 1997 | 5,300 | Cairns Taipans |
| Australia (list) | Canberra | AIS Arena | 1981 | 5,200 | Canberra Capitals |
| Australia (list) | Gold Coast | Carrara Indoor Stadium | | 2,992 | |
| Australia (list) | Gold Coast | Gold Coast Convention & Exhibition Centre | 2004 | 5,269 | |
| Australia (list) | Hobart | Derwent Entertainment Centre | 1989 | 5,400 | |
| Australia (list) | Melbourne | Melbourne Arena (retractable roof) | 2000 | 10,500 | Australian Open (Court 1), Melbourne United, Melbourne Vixens (ANZ Championship) |
| Australia (list) | Melbourne | Margaret Court Arena (retractable roof) | 1988 | 7,500 | Australian Open (Court 2), Melbourne United, Melbourne Vixens (ANZ Championship) |
| Australia (list) | Melbourne | Marvel Stadium (retractable roof) | 2000 | 56,347 | St Kilda FC (AFL), Western Bulldogs (AFL), Carlton FC (AFL), Essendon FC (AFL), some matches of Melbourne Victory FC (A-League) |
| Australia (list) | Melbourne | Melbourne Sports and Entertainment Centre | 1956 | 7,500 | Collingwood FC Training Centre |
| Australia (list) | Melbourne | Rod Laver Arena (retractable roof) | 1988 | 16,550 | Australian Open (Centre Court) |
| Australia (list) | Melbourne | State Netball & Hockey Centre | 2001 | 3,500 | Melbourne United, Melbourne Vixens (ANZ Championship) |
| Australia (list) | Newcastle | Broadmeadow Basketball Stadium | 1969 | 2,000 | |
| Australia (list) | Newcastle | Newcastle Entertainment Centre | 1992 | 4,658 | |
| Australia (list) | Perth | Arena Joondalup | 1994 | 16,000 | |
| Australia (list) | Perth | Perth Arena (retractable roof) | 2012 | 15,500 | Hopman Cup, Perth Wildcats |
| Australia (list) | Perth | Burswood Dome | 1987 | 13,600 | Hopman Cup |
| Australia (list) | Perth | Perth High Performance Centre | 1986 | 4,500 | Perth Lynx (WNBL) |
| Australia (list) | Perth | WA Basketball Centre | 2010 | 2,000 | Perth Lynx (WNBL) |
| Australia (list) | Sydney | Sydney Entertainment Centre | 1983 | 12,500 | |
| Australia (list) | Sydney | State Sports Centre | 1984 | 5,006 | Sydney Kings, New South Wales Swifts (ANZ Championship) |
| Australia (list) | Sydney | Sydney SuperDome | 1999 | 21,000 | |
| Australia (list) | Townsville | Townsville Entertainment Centre | 1993 | 5,257 | Townsville Crocodiles |
| Australia (list) | Wollongong | Wollongong Entertainment Centre | 1998 | 5,800 | Illawarra Hawks |
| New Zealand (list) | Auckland | ASB Stadium | 1987 | 3,700 | |
| New Zealand (list) | Auckland | Eventfinda Stadium | 1992 | 4,500 | New Zealand Breakers, Northern Mystics (part schedule) |
| New Zealand (list) | Auckland | Sir Woolf Fisher Arena at Due Drop Events Centre | 2005 | 3,000 | |
| New Zealand (list) | Auckland | The Trusts Arena | 2006 | 4,901 | Northern Mystics (part schedule) |
| New Zealand (list) | Auckland | Vector Arena | 2007 | 12,200 | New Zealand Breakers, Northern Mystics (part schedule) |
| New Zealand (list) | Christchurch | Christchurch Arena | 1998 | 9,100 | Canterbury Tactix |
| New Zealand (list) | Hamilton | Claudelands Arena | 2011 | 6,000 | Waikato/Bay of Plenty Magic (part schedule) |
| New Zealand (list) | Hamilton | Mystery Creek Events Centre | 1971 | 5,000 | Waikato/Bay of Plenty Magic (part schedule) |
| New Zealand (list) | Invercargill | Stadium Southland | 2000 | 6,000 | Southern Steel |
| New Zealand (list) | New Plymouth | TSB Stadium | 1992 | 4,560 | |
| New Zealand (list) | Palmerston North | Arena 2 | 1980 | 5,000 | |
| New Zealand (list) | Dunedin | Forsyth Barr Stadium | 2011 | 30,500 | |
| New Zealand (list) | Rotorua | Energy Events Centre | | 3,500 | Waikato/Bay of Plenty Magic (part schedule) |
| New Zealand (list) | Wellington | Te Rauparaha Arena | 2008 | 3,000 | |
| New Zealand (list) | Wellington | TSB Bank Arena | 1995 | 5,600 | Central Pulse |

== South America ==
| Country | Location | Venue | Date built | Capacity | Tenant/use |
|---|---|---|---|---|---|
| Argentina (List) | Greater Buenos Aires | Estadio Mary Terán de Weiss (Parque Roca) | 2006 (fully covered in 2018) | 15,500 | Autonomous City of Buenos Aires |
| Argentina (List) | Greater Buenos Aires | Luna Park | 1932 (covered in 1934) | 8,300 | Sociedad Salesiana de San Juan Bosco y Cáritas Argentina |
| Argentina (List) | Greater Buenos Aires | Estadio Obras Sanitarias | 1978 | 5,000 | Obras Sanitarias |
| Argentina (List) | Greater Buenos Aires | Microestadio Malvinas Argentinas | 2006 | 6,000 | Argentinos Juniors |
| Argentina (List) | Greater Buenos Aires | DirecTV Arena | 2015 | 15,000 | DIRECTV & ALG Sports |
| Argentina (List) | Greater Buenos Aires | Arena Tecnópolis | 2013 | 12,000 | Government of Argentina |
| Argentina (List) | Greater Buenos Aires | Movistar Arena | 2019 | 15,000 | ASM Global |
| Argentina (List) | La Plata | Polideportivo Víctor Nethol | 1978 | 3,000 | Gimnasia y Esgrima La Plata |
| Argentina (List) | Mar del Plata | Polideportivo Islas Malvinas | 1995 | 8,000 | Club Atlético Peñarol |
| Argentina (List) | Olavarría | Parque Carlos Guerrero | 1982 | 6,070 | Estudiantes de Olavarría |
| Argentina (List) | Bahía Blanca | Estadio Osvaldo Casanova | 1932/1939 | 3,950 | Estudiantes de Bahía Blanca |
| Argentina (List) | Pilar | Microestadio Ricardo Rusticucci | 2017 | 4,000 | Pilar Municipality |
| Argentina (List) | Córdoba | Orfeo Superdomo | 2002 | 14,000 | Dinosaurio Group |
| Argentina (List) | Santa Fe | Estadio Ángel Malvicino | 1998 | 6,000 | Unión de Santa Fe |
| Argentina (List) | Rosario | Estadio Claudio Newell | 1978 | 10,000 | Newell's Old Boys |
| Argentina (List) | Rosario | Estadio Salvador Bonilla | 1982 | 5,000 | Club Atlético Provincial |
| Argentina (List) | Sunchales | Estadio Hogar de los Tigres | 1998 | 4,200 | Club Deportivo Libertad |
| Argentina (List) | Puerto General San Martín | Mega Estadio 4 de Junio | 2021 | 3,500 | Puerto General San Martín Municipality |
| Argentina (List) | Mendoza | Aconcagua Arena | 2018 | 14,000 | Mendoza Province |
| Argentina (List) | San Martín | Polideportivo Gustavo Rodríguez | 2011 | 4,000 | San Martín Municipality |
| Argentina (List) | La Rioja | Superdomo | 2015 | 11,000 | La Rioja Province |
| Argentina (List) | San Juan | Estadio Aldo Cantoni | 1967 | 8,000 | San Juan Province, UPCN Vóley Club |
| Argentina (List) | Formosa | Polideportivo Cincuentenario | 2007 | 4,500 | Formosa Province, Club La Unión |
| Argentina (List) | Resistencia | Microestadio Raul Alejo Gronda | 1987 | 4,000 | Club Atlético Sarmiento |
| Argentina (List) | Presidencia Roque Sáenz Peña | Arena UNCAUS | 2013 | 3,500 | Universidad del Chaco Austral |
| Argentina (List) | Salta | Polideportivo Delmi | 1986 | 6,000 | Salta Province |
| Argentina (List) | Neuquen | Estadio Ruca Che | 1995 | 8,000 | Independiente de Neuquén, Gigantes del Sur |
| Argentina (List) | Puerto Madryn | Estadio Lujan Barrientos | 2004 | 3,500 | Deportivo Madryn |
| Bolivia | La Paz | Coliseo Julio Borelli Viterito | 1977 | 10,000 | |
| Bolivia | El Alto | Polideportivo Héroes de Octubre | 2013 | 10,000 | |
| Bolivia | Quillacollo | Polideportivo Evo Morales | 2015 | 12,000 | |
| Bolivia | Sucre | Polideportivo Garcilazo | 2009 | 10,000 | |
| Bolivia | Oruro | Coliseo Eduardo Leclere Polo | 2000 | 10,000 | |
| Bolivia | Cochabamba | Coliseo José Casto Méndez | 1968 (covered in 1992) | 8,000 | |
| Bolivia | Potosí | Coliseo Ciudad de Potosí | 2013 | 8,000 | |
| Bolivia | Tarija | Coliseo Guadalquivir | 2016 | 5,000 | |
| Bolivia | Trinidad | Coliseo Cancha Vieja | 2014 | 5,000 | |
| Bolivia | Cobija | Coliseo Alfredo Huary Gonzales | 2014 | 4,500 | |
| Brazil (List) | Aracaju | Ginásio Constâncio Vieira | 1977 | 5,000 | |
| Brazil (List) | Barueri | Ginásio José Corrêa | 2004 | 5,000 | |
| Brazil (List) | Bauru | Ginásio Paulo Skaf | 2021 | 5,000 | |
| Brazil (List) | Belém | Arena Guilherme Paraense | 2016 | 11,970 | |
| Brazil (List) | Belo Horizonte | Estádio Jornalista Felipe Drummond (Mineirinho) | 1980 | 25,000 | |
| Brazil (List) | Blumenau | Ginásio Sebastião Cruz | 2008 | 3,000 | |
| Brazil (List) | Boa Vista | Ginásio Romero Regueira Jucá | 2009 | 6,500 | |
| Brazil (List) | Brasília | Ginásio Nilson Nelson | 1973 | 16,600 | |
| Brazil (List) | Campina Grande | Ginásio O Meninão | 1992 | 5,000 | |
| Brazil (List) | Campo Grande | Ginásio Poliesportivo Avelino dos Reis | 1984 | 8,000 | |
| Brazil (List) | Cuiabá | Ginásio Aecim Tocantins | 2007 | 12,000 | |
| Brazil (List) | Curitiba | Ginásio do Tarumã | 1965 | 4,555 | |
| Brazil (List) | Fortaleza | Centro de Formação Olímpica do Nordeste | 2014 | 17,100 | |
| Brazil (List) | Fortaleza | Ginásio Paulo Sarasate | 1971 | 8,822 | |
| Brazil (List) | Franca | Polidesportivo do Pedrocão | 1975 | 6,000 | |
| Brazil (List) | Goiânia | Goiânia Arena | 2002 | 15,000 | |
| Brazil (List) | Gurupi | Ginásio de Esportes Idanizete de Paula | 1987 | 5,000 | |
| Brazil (List) | Jaraguá do Sul | Arena Jaraguá | 2007 | 8,000 | |
| Brazil (List) | Joao Pessoa | Ginásio Poliesportivo Ronaldo Cunha Lima | 1994 | 3,500 | |
| Brazil (List) | Lages | Ginásio Jones Minosso | 2002 | 5,000 | |
| Brazil (List) | Londrina | Ginásio do Moringão | 1972 | 13,000 | |
| Brazil (List) | Macapá | Ginásio Avertino Ramos | 1975 | 3,000 | |
| Brazil (List) | Maceió | Ginásio Poliesportivo Lauthenay Perdigão | 1994 | 10,000 | |
| Brazil (List) | Manaus | Amadeu Teixeira Arena | 2006 | 11,800 | |
| Brazil (List) | Maringá | Ginásio Chico Neto | 1976 | 4,538 | |
| Brazil (List) | Natal | Ginásio Nélio Dias | 2008 | 10,000 | |
| Brazil (List) | Porto Alegre | Ginásio Gigantinho | 1973 | 14,586 | |
| Brazil (List) | Porto Velho | Ginásio Cláudio Coutinho | 1982 | 3,000 | |
| Brazil (List) | Recife | Ginásio de Esportes Geraldo Magalhães | 1970 | 15,000 | |
| Brazil (List) | Rio de Janeiro | Ginásio Gilberto Cardoso (Maracanãzinho) | 1954 | 13,163 | |
| Brazil (List) | Rio de Janeiro | HSBC Arena | 2007 | 15,000 | |
| Brazil (List) | Rio de Janeiro | Carioca Arena 1 | 2016 | 16,000 | |
| Brazil (List) | Rio de Janeiro | Carioca Arena 2 | 2016 | 10,000 | |
| Brazil (List) | Rio de Janeiro | Carioca Arena 3 | 2016 | 10,000 | |
| Brazil (List) | Santos | Arena Santos | 2010 | 5,000 | |
| Brazil (List) | São José dos Campos | Farma Conde Arena | 2022 | 5,000 | |
| Brazil (List) | São Luis | Ginásio Georgiana Pflueger | 1981 | 4,500 | |
| Brazil (List) | São Paulo | Ginásio do Ibirapuera | 1954 | 11,000 | |
| Brazil (List) | São Paulo | Ginásio Wlamir Marques | 1963 | 7,000 | |
| Brazil (List) | São Paulo | Ginásio da Portuguesa | 1974 | 5,000 | |
| Brazil (List) | São Paulo | Ginásio do Pacaembu | 1940 | 3,000 | |
| Brazil (List) | Teresina | Ginásio Governador Dirceu Arcoverde | 1978 | 5,000 | |
| Brazil (List) | Uberlândia | Ginásio Municipal Tancredo Neves | 2007 | 12,000 | |
| Chile | Santiago | Movistar Arena | 2006 | 17,000 | |
| Chile | Santiago | Estadio Víctor Jara | 1969 | 4,500 | |
| Chile | Santiago | Teatro Caupolicán | 1936 | 4,500 | |
| Chile | Talcahuano | Coliseo La Tortuga | 1980 | 10,000 | |
| Chile | Antofagasta | Estadio Sokol | 1966 | 6,000 | |
| Chile | Concepción | Gimnasio Municipal de Concepción | 1989 | 3,500 | |
| Chile | Concepción | Gimnasio A de la Casa del Deporte | 1944 | 3,000 | |
| Colombia | Bogotá | Movistar Arena Bogotá | 1973 | 14,000 | |
| Colombia | Bogotá | Coliseo El Salitre | 1973 | 6,000 | |
| Colombia | Bogotá | Coliseo MedPlus | 2022 | 24,000 | Biggest indoor arena in Latin America. |
| Colombia | Cali | Coliseo El Pueblo | 1971 | 12,000 | |
| Colombia | Bucaramanga | Coliseo Bicentenario | 2011 | 7,600 | |
| Colombia | Neiva | Coliseo Álvaro Sánchez Silva | 1986 | 8,000 | |
| Colombia | Medellín | Coliseo Iván de Bedout | 1955 | 8,000 | |
| Colombia | Medellín | Arena Daviarena | 2026 | 17,200 | |
| Colombia | Armenia | Coliseo del Café | 1986 | 8,000 | |
| Colombia | Villavicencio | Coliseo Álvaro Mesa Amaya | 2023 | 8,000 | |
| Colombia | Valledupar | Coliseo Julio Monsalvo | 1999 | 5,000 | |
| Colombia | Barranquilla | Coliseo Sugar Baby Rojas | 2018 | 4,000 | |
| Colombia | Manizales | Coliseo Jorge Arango Uribe | 1936 (covered in 1951) | 4,000 | |
| Colombia | Cúcuta | Coliseo Toto Hernandez | 1953 | 3,000 | |
| Ecuador | Quito | Coliseo General Rumiñahui | 1992 | 16,000 | |
| Ecuador | Quito | Coliseo Julio César Hidalgo | 1953 | 6,000 | |
| Ecuador | Guayaquil | Coliseo Voltaire Paladines Polo | 1963 | 10,000 | |
| Ecuador | Cuenca | Coliseo Jefferson Pérez | 1985 | 5,000 | |
| Ecuador | Portoviejo | Coliseo José Saltos Sánchez | 1980s | 5,000 | |
| Ecuador | Manta | Nuevo Coliseo Lorgio Pinargote | 2014 | 4,500 | |
| Paraguay | Asunción | SND Arena | 1978/2018 | 6,000 | |
| Paraguay | Ypacaraí | Estadio Bicentenario de la Independencia Nacional | 2010 (Still No Roof) | 10,000 | |
| Paraguay | Presidente Franco | Polideportivo Presidente Franco | 2000s (covered in 2011) | 6,000 | |
| Paraguay | Caaguazú | Estadio Tajy Poty | 1978 (covered in 2008) | 6,000 | |
| Paraguay | Pedro Juan Caballero | Estadio Campeones del Abambay | 1989/2021 | 5,000 | |
| Paraguay | Villarica | Estadio Ykua Pyta | 1968 | 5,000 | |
| Paraguay | San Ignacio | Estadio Dos Bocas | 2000s | 4,500 | |
| Paraguay | Puerto Casado | Coliseo Puerto Casado | 2016 | 4,000 | |
| Paraguay | Luque | Estadio Oscar Harrison | 2023 | 3,300 | |
| Paraguay | Villa Elisa | Polideportivo Estanislao Frutos | 2022 | 3,000 | |
| Paraguay | Santa Rosa | Estadio Multideportivo Roseño | 2021 | 3,000 | |
| Peru | Lima | Coliseo Amauta | 1948 (covered in 1968) | 20,000 | |
| Peru | Lima | Coliseo Mariscal Caceres | 1990 | 7,000 | |
| Peru | Lima | Coliseo Eduardo Dibos | 1989 | 6,000 | |
| Peru | Lima | Polideportivo Villa El Salvador | 2019 | 5,000 | |
| Peru | Cusco | Coliseo Casa de la Juventud | 1980 | 12,000 | |
| Peru | Trujillo | Coliseo Gran Chimu | 1971 | 12,000 | |
| Peru | Arequipa | Coliseo Arequipa | 1954 | 9,000 | |
| Peru | Cajamarca | Coliseo Gran Qhapaq Ñan | 2018 | 8,000 | |
| Peru | Iquitos | Coliseo Juan Pinasco Villanueva | 1964 | 9,000 | |
| Peru | Callao | Polideportivo del Callao | 2019 | 6,000 | |
| Peru | Tacna | Coliseo Cerrado Peru | 1954 | 6,000 | |
| Peru | Ica | Coliseo José Oliva Razzetto | 1970s | 6,000 | |
| Peru | Puerto Maldonado | Coliseo Madre de Dios | 2013 | 5,000 | |
| Peru | Huancayo | Coliseo Wanka Angélica Quintana | 1983 | 5,000 | |
| Peru | Huanuco | Coliseo 15 de Agosto | 1980s | 5,000 | |
| Peru | Chiclayo | Coliseo Cerrado de Chiclayo | 1972 | 5,000 | |
| Uruguay | Montevideo | Antel Arena | 2018 | 15,000 | Government of Uruguay |
| Uruguay | Paysandú | Estadio 8 de Junio | 1977 | 5,000 | |
| Venezuela | Caracas | Poliedro de Caracas | 1974 | 20,000 | |
| Venezuela | Caracas | Gimnasio José Beracasa | 1983 | 6,000 | |
| Venezuela | Barquisimeto | Domo Bolivariano | 1982 | 10,000 | |
| Venezuela | Valencia | Forum de Valencia | 1991 | 10,000 | |
| Venezuela | La Asunción | Gimnasio La Asunción | 1993 | 10,000 | |
| Venezuela | La Guaira | Domo José María Vargas | 2008 | 8,000 | |
| Venezuela | Guanare | Coliseo Carl Herrera | 1998 | 7,500 | |
| Venezuela | San Cristóbal | Gimnasio Campeones Mundiales del 97 | 2005 | 7,000 | |
| Venezuela | Puerto la Cruz | Gimnasio Luis Ramos | 1965 | 5,500 | |
| Venezuela | San Juan de los Morros | Domo San Juan de los Morros | 2007 | 5,500 | |
| Venezuela | Ciudad Guayana | Gimnasio Hermanas González | 1980 | 5,000 | |
| Venezuela | Maracaibo | Gimnasio Pedro Elías Belisario Aponte | 1968 | 4,500 | |

== See also ==
- Arena
- Stadium
- Sport venue
- Lists of stadiums
- List of buildings
- List of music venues
- List of indoor arenas by capacity
