= 2026–27 Liga Premier A season =

Liga Premier A
- Season: 2026–27
- Matches: 119
- Goals: 434 (3.65 per match)
- Top goalscorer: Octavio Díaz (13 goals)
- Biggest home win: Acámbaro 8–0 Cañoneros (30 August 2026)
- Biggest away win: Cañoneros 1–7 Calor (10 October 2026)
- Highest scoring: Acámbaro 8–0 Cañoneros (30 August 2026); Cañoneros 1–7 Calor (10 October 2026)
- Longest winning run: 6 matches Artesanos Metepec
- Longest unbeaten run: 10 matches Dragones de Oaxaca
- Longest winless run: 12 matches Cañoneros
- Longest losing run: 12 matches Cañoneros
- Highest attendance: 2,500; Guerreros del Pacífico vs. Ciervos (4 September 2026)
- Lowest attendance: 30; Mineros de Fresnillo vs. Real Apodaca (30 August 2026)
- Total attendance: 32,713
- Average attendance: 574
- Stats are from the regular season only

The 2026–27 Liga Premier A season is part of the third-tier football league of Mexico. The tournament began on 28 August 2026 and will finish in May 2027.

Starting this season the Premier A became the intermediate branch of the Liga Premier de México, with the clubs of medium level and infrastructure that can aspire to promotion in the medium term.

== Changes ==
=== Offseason ===
- On 18 April 2026, Artesanos Metepec was promoted from Liga Premier B to Premier A.
- On 27 April 2026, Avispones de Chilpancingo was relocated to Acapulco and renamed Guerreros del Pacífico.
- On 23 May 2026, Delfines de Coatzacoalcos was promoted from Liga TDP to Premier A.
- On 24 May 2026, Saltillo Soccer was promoted from Liga TDP to Premier A.
- On 24 May 2026, La Tribu de Ciudad Juárez was promoted from Liga TDP to Liga Premier. On August 1, 2026 La Tribu joined to Premier A as an expansion team.
- On 3 June 2026, Tecos went on hiatus due to a financial restructuring of the club and the lack of a stadium suitable for the league.
- On 12 June 2026, Alacranes de Durango, the 2025–26 season runner–up, was promoted to Liga de Expansión MX as a guest team. Since the season champion, Deportiva Venados, failed to meet the requirements to be promoted.
- On 16 June 2026, Dragones de Oaxaca announced that they successfully passed the financial and sporting certification, and were therefore accepted into Premier A.
- On 1 July 2026, Gavilanes de Matamoros went on hiatus due to financial problems.
- On 1 July 2026, Calor announced its departure from Reynosa due to breach of contract by the administration that managed the club in the city. On 24 July, the club was relocated to Oaxtepec, Morelos.
- On 8 July 2026, Dragones Toluca went on hiatus due to a restructuring of the club.
- On 8 July 2026, Acámbaro announced that they successfully passed the financial and sporting certification, and were therefore accepted into Premier A.
- On 9 July 2026, Zitácuaro went on hiatus because the club is looking to relaunch its sports project by focusing on local players, taking a year as a break to strengthen its local squad.
- On 1 August 2026, Atlético Celaya, Chapulineros de Oaxaca, Cordobés, Deportiva Venados, Halcones, Inter Playa del Carmen, Jaguares, La Piedad, Lobos ULMX, Los Cabos United, Montañeses, Pioneros de Cancún, Racing de Veracruz, Tapachula, Tigres de Álica, Tritones Vallarta and Zacatepec were promoted from Liga Premier A to Primera Premier as the teams in that branch with the best conditions to qualify for promotion to Liga de Expansión MX.
- On 1 August 2026, Colima, Cimarrones de Sonora, Ensenada, Neza, Sporting Canamy, Tuzos UAZ and UdeG Premier went on hiatus due to financial problems or restructuring.
- On 1 August 2026, Atlético Hidalgo was relocated to Liga Premier B.
- On 1 August 2026, Halcones Negros, Real Refineros and Vaqueros Reynosa joined the league as expansion teams.
- On 10 August 2026, Héroes de Zaci was relocated from Mexico City to Nuevo Laredo, after the team attempted to establish itself in Reynosa but was unable to use a suitable sports facility in the city.
- On 12 August 2026, Cañoneros announced that it would be relocated from Xalapa to Progreso Industrial, State of Mexico. However, the proposed stadium did not pass the league's review, so the team ultimately established its home ground at Estadio Momoxco in Milpa Alta, Mexico City.

=== Onseason ===
- On 8 October 2026, Calor was relocated from Oaxtepec to Chalco due to administrative issues.

== Teams ==
The 2026–27 Liga Premier A season has the following 20 participating clubs.

Locations clubs in the 2026–27 Liga Premier A season.
Group 1
Group 2

=== Group 1 ===
Club	Manager	City	Stadium	Capacity
Guerreros de Autlán	(Mexico) Sergio Díaz	Autlán	Unidad Deportiva Chapultepec	1,500
Héroes de Zaci	(Mexico) Enrique Garza	Nuevo Laredo	Unidad Deportiva Benito Juárez	5,000
La Tribu de Ciudad Juárez	(Mexico) Jorge Villa	Ciudad Juárez	8 de Diciembre	4,050
Mineros de Fresnillo (Note: Team affiliated with Mineros de Zacatecas.)	(Mexico) Jorge Horta	Zacatecas	Carlos Vega Villalba	20,777
Real Apodaca	(Mexico) Ricardo Rayas	Apodaca	Centenario del Ejército Mexicano	2,000
Saltillo Soccer	(Mexico) Joel de León	Saltillo	Olímpico Francisco I. Madero	7,000
Santiago	(Mexico) Martín Moreno	Allende	La Capilla Soccer Park (Note: The team also plays some matches at the Cancha FCD El Barrial, Santiago, Nuevo León)	1,000
UAT Premier (Note: Team affiliated with Correcaminos UAT.)	(Mexico) Jorge Urbina	Ciudad Victoria	Eugenio Alvizo Porras (Note: The team also plays some matches at the Estadio Marte R. Gómez)	5,000
Vaqueros Reynosa	(Mexico) Marco Angúlo	Reynosa	Unidad Deportiva Solidaridad	15,000
Zapotlanejo	(Mexico) Jorge Mora	Zapotlanejo	Miguel Hidalgo (Note: The team played some of its home matches of the season at the Estadio Gregorio "Tepa" Gómez in Tepatitlán because the Estadio Miguel Hidalgo was damaged by flooding following a storm in the city.)	1,800

=== Group 2 ===
Club	Manager	City	Stadium	Capacity
Acámbaro	(Mexico) Francisco Tena	Acámbaro	Fray Salvador Rangel	3,500
Artesanos Metepec	(Mexico) Gustavo Contreras	Metepec	Unidad Deportiva Alarcón Hisojo	2,000
Calor	(Mexico) Ismael Íñiguez	Chalco de Díaz Covarrubias	Arreola	3,217
Cañoneros	(Mexico) David Zaragoza	Mexico City	Momoxco	3,500
Ciervos	Vacant	Chalco de Díaz Covarrubias	Arreola	3,217
Delfines de Coatzacoalcos	(Mexico) Iván Liévano	Coatzacoalcos	Rafael Hernández Ochoa (Note: The team plays some matches at Estadio Luis "Pirata" Fuente, Veracruz due to renovation works at the Estadio Rafael Hernández Ochoa.)	4,800
Dragones de Oaxaca	(Mexico) Víctor Hernández	Oaxaca	Tecnológico de Oaxaca	14,950
Guerreros del Pacífico	(Mexico) Arturo Juárez	Acapulco	Unidad Deportiva Acapulco	13,000
Halcones Negros	(Mexico) Oscar Lintón	Texcoco	Municipal Claudio Suárez	4,000
Real Refineros	(Chile) Héctor Mancilla	Salamanca	Sección XXIV	10,000

=== Regular season ===
==== Group 1 ====
Pos	Team	Pld	W	D	L	GF	GA	GD	BP	Pts	Qualification or relegation
1	La Tribu de Ciudad Juárez	13	9	0	4	42	14	+28	2	29	Advance to Liguilla (Note: The first 4 places in the two groups qualify for the Liguilla.)
2	Santiago	13	7	3	3	29	9	+20	2	26	Advance to Liguilla
3	UAT Premier (Note: Reserves team; does not participate in the promotion playoffs.)	13	6	4	3	23	15	+8	3	25	Advance to Torneo de Filiales (Note: The first 2 reserves teams qualify for the Torneo Talento Premier Filiales.)
4	Mineros de Fresnillo	13	6	4	3	21	11	+10	1	23	Advance to Torneo de Filiales
5	ACF Zapotlanejo	13	7	1	5	27	29	−2	1	23	Advance to Liguilla
6	Vaqueros Reynosa	12	6	3	3	20	17	+3	1	22	Advance to Liguilla
7	Guerreros de Autlán	12	5	2	5	27	22	+5	1	18	
8	Saltillo Soccer	13	5	1	7	25	31	−6	1	17	
9	Real Apodaca	12	3	2	7	18	20	−2	2	13	
10	Héroes de Zaci	12	0	2	10	4	35	−31	0	2	

Updated to match(es) played on 21 November 2026. Source: Liga Premier FMF

===== Positions by round =====
Qualification to Quarter–finals
Last place in table

Team ╲ Round	1	2	3	4	5	6	7	8	9	10	11	12	13	14	15	16	17	18	19	20	21	22	23	24	25	26	27	28
La Tribu	1	1	1	1	1	1	3	1	1	3	3	1																
Santiago	8	3	6	5	6	8	5	6	4	2	1	2																
Fresnillo	5	6	5	2	4	4	2	2	2	4	4	3																
Zapotlanejo	2	4	3	3	2	2	4	3	3	1	2	4																
UAT Premier	6	7	8	9	10	5	6	5	6	5	5	5																
Vaqueros Reynosa	3	2	2	4	3	3	1	4	5	6	6	6																
Autlán	10	10	7	8	7	6	7	7	7	7	7	7																
Real Apodaca	4	8	10	7	8	9	9	9	9	9	9	8																
Saltillo Soccer	9	5	4	6	5	7	8	8	8	8	8	9																
Héroes de Zaci	7	9	9	10	9	10	10	10	10	10	10	10																

Updated to match(es) played on 15 November 2026. Source: Liga Premier FMF

==== Group 2 ====
Pos	Team	Pld	W	D	L	GF	GA	GD	BP	Pts	Qualification or relegation
1	Dragones de Oaxaca	13	8	4	1	32	14	+18	1	29	Advance to Liguilla (Note: The first 4 places in the two groups qualify for the Liguilla.)
2	Artesanos Metepec	13	8	4	1	23	8	+15	1	29	Advance to Liguilla
3	Acámbaro	12	7	2	3	37	16	+21	3	26	Advance to Liguilla
4	Delfines de Coatzacoalcos	13	5	7	1	20	15	+5	2	24	Advance to Liguilla
5	Guerreros del Pacífico	13	5	4	4	27	21	+6	3	22	
6	Halcones Negros	13	6	1	6	27	23	+4	1	20	
7	Real Refineros CDS	13	4	4	5	25	29	−4	3	19	
8	Calor	13	4	1	8	21	40	−19	2	15	
9	Ciervos	12	1	1	10	13	47	−34	1	5	
10	Cañoneros	13	0	0	13	6	50	−44	0	0	

Updated to match(es) played on 21 November 2026. Source: Liga Premier FMF

===== Positions by round =====
Qualification to Quarter–finals
Last place in table

Team ╲ Round	1	2	3	4	5	6	7	8	9	10	11	12	13	14	15	16	17	18	19	20	21	22	23	24	25	26	27	28
Dragones de Oaxaca	1	1	2	2	2	2	2	2	1	1	1	1																
Acámbaro	2	2	3	3	3	4	4	3	2	3	3	2																
Metepec	3	3	1	1	1	1	1	1	3	2	2	3																
Coatzacoalcos	4	6	5	6	5	5	6	5	4	4	4	4																
Halcones Negros	5	7	4	7	4	3	3	4	5	5	5	5																
Refineros	8	5	6	4	6	8	8	7	8	7	7	6																
Guerreros Pacífico	7	4	7	8	7	6	7	8	6	6	6	7																
Calor	6	8	8	5	8	7	5	6	7	8	8	8																
Ciervos	9	9	9	9	9	9	9	9	9	9	9	9																
Cañoneros	10	10	10	10	10	10	10	10	10	10	10	10																

Updated to match(es) played on 15 November 2026. Source: Liga Premier FMF

==== League table ====
Pos	Team	Pld	W	D	L	GF	GA	GD	BP	Pts	Qualification or relegation
1	La Tribu de Ciudad Juárez	13	9	0	4	42	14	+28	2	29	Advance to Liguilla (Note: The first 4 places in the two groups qualify for the Liguilla.)
2	Dragones de Oaxaca	13	8	4	1	32	14	+18	1	29	Advance to Liguilla
3	Artesanos Metepec	13	8	4	1	23	8	+15	1	29	Advance to Liguilla
4	Acámbaro	12	7	2	3	37	16	+21	3	26	Advance to Liguilla
5	Santiago	13	7	3	3	29	9	+20	2	26	Advance to Liguilla
6	UAT Premier (Note: Reserves team; does not participate in the promotion playoffs.)	13	6	4	3	23	15	+8	3	25	Advance to Torneo de Filiales (Note: The first 2 reserves teams qualify for the Torneo Talento Premier Filiales.)
7	Delfines de Coatzacoalcos	13	5	7	1	20	15	+5	2	24	Advance to Liguilla
8	Mineros de Fresnillo	13	6	4	3	21	11	+10	1	23	Advance to Torneo de Filiales
9	ACF Zapotlanejo	13	7	1	5	27	29	−2	1	23	Advance to Liguilla
10	Guerreros del Pacífico	13	5	4	4	27	21	+6	3	22	
11	Vaqueros Reynosa	12	6	3	3	20	17	+3	1	22	Advance to Liguilla
12	Halcones Negros	13	6	1	6	27	23	+4	1	20	
13	Real Refineros CDS	13	4	4	5	25	30	−5	3	19	
14	Guerreros de Autlán	12	5	2	5	27	22	+5	1	18	
15	Saltillo Soccer	13	5	1	7	25	31	−6	1	17	
16	Calor	13	4	1	8	21	40	−19	2	15	
17	Real Apodaca	12	3	2	7	18	20	−2	2	13	
18	Ciervos	12	1	1	10	13	47	−34	1	5	
19	Héroes de Zaci	12	0	2	10	4	35	−31	0	2	
20	Cañoneros	13	0	0	13	6	50	−44	0	0	Relegation to Liga Premier B (Note: The worst team of the regular season will be relegated to Liga Premier B, the lower branch of the Liga Premier.)

Updated to match(es) played on 21 November 2026. Source: Liga Premier FMF

==== Results ====
Each team will play 28 matches during the season: 18 against their group rivals, playing both home and away, and ten matches against opponents from the other group.

Home \ Away	ACM	ART	CAL	CAÑ	CIE	DCO	DRA	AUT	GPC	HNG	HER	LTJ	FRE	RAP	REF	SSC	SAT	UAT	VAQ	ZAP
Acámbaro	—	2–3		8–0	5–2		1–1	—			5–1	—				—	—		2–2	—
Artesanos Metepec		—	3–0	3–0			0–0	—		2–1	—			—		4–0	—	1–1		—
Calor	3–2		—			1–2			2–4		-	—		0–5		—	—	1–4	—	—
Cañoneros			1–7	—		1–2		—	0–2		—		—	—	0–1		—		1–3	2–4
Ciervos		0–3	0–4	3–1	—		0–2	—		0–5	—	0–7	—	—			0–3	—		
Coatzacoalcos	1–2	1–1				—	3–3	—			6–0	3–1	2–2	—	2–2	—	—			—
Dragones				3–0			—	4–2	5–1	2–1	-	—	2–0		3–2	—		—	—	—
Autlán	—	—	8–1	—	—	—		—	3–1	2–1		2–1						3–0	3–4	
Guerreros Pacífico	0–1				2–0	0–0			—		5–0	—	—			—	1–1	—	—	
Halcones Negros	0–6		7–0			0–0			3–0	—	—	—	—	1–0				—	—	4–2
Héroes de Zaci		—	0–1	—	—	0–1				—	—				—					0–1
La Tribu de Juárez	—	2–0	—	8–0			—		—	—	5–0	—		3–1	4–1		0–2		2–1	4–0
Mineros Fresnillo	3–1	0–1	4–1	—	—			0–0	—	—	2–0		—	0–0	—	3–0	2–0			
Real Apodaca		—		—	—	—	3–0	2–0	3–3					—	—	2–3		0–1	1–2	
Refineros		1–2	0–0		3–3			3–2	3–3	2–3	—		—	—	—	4–1		—	—	
Saltillo Soccer	—		—	2–0	7–2	—	—		—	3–1	2–2	1–4				—		2–0		2–3
Santiago	—	—	—	—		—	1–1	2–2		4–0	3–0			3–0	6–0	4–1	—			
UAT Premier	0–2			4–0	—	2–2	—		—	—	3–0	3–1	0–0		—			—		1–1
Vaqueros Reynosa		0–0	—			0–1	—		—	—	1–1		2–1		—	2–1	1–0	2–4	—	
Zapotlanejo	—	—	—		5–3	—	—	3–0	0–5				2–4	4–1	1–3		1–0			—

Updated to match(es) played on 21 November 2026. Source: Liga Premier FMF
Legend: Blue = home team win; Yellow = draw; Red = away team win.

=== Regular season statistics ===
==== Top goalscorers ====
Players sorted first by goals scored, then by last name.

Rank	Player	Club	Goals
1	(Mexico) Octavio Díaz	La Tribu de Ciudad Juárez	13
2	(Mexico) Alexander Pozos	Acámbaro	11
3	(Mexico) Aldo Encinas	Mineros de Fresnillo	9
3	(Mexico) Fabián Salas	Santiago	9
5	(Mexico) Ariel Morán	Saltillo Soccer	8
6	(Mexico) Carlos Morón	Acámbaro	7
6	(Mexico) Even Padilla	La Tribu de Ciudad Juárez	7
6	(Mexico) Mario Reyes	Ciervos	7
9	(Mexico) Juan Diego Arias	ACF Zapotlanejo	6
9	(Argentina) Luis Campero	UAT Premier	6
9	(Mexico) Hailton Hernández	Delfines de Coatzacoalcos	6
9	(Mexico) Juan Pablo Lara	Real Refineros CDS	6
9	(Mexico) Farid Patjane	Dragones de Oaxaca	6
9	(Mexico) Moisés Percastre	Real Refineros CDS	6
9	(Mexico) Brian Torres	Delfines de Coatzacoalcos	6

Source:Liga Premier FMF

==== Hat-tricks ====
Player	For	Against	Result	Date	Round
(Mexico) Carlos Morón	Acámbaro	Cañoneros	8 – 0 (H)	30 August 2026	1
(Mexico) Ángel González^{4}	Halcones Negros	Calor	7 – 0 (H)	26 September 2026	5
(United States) Darey Zamora	Calor	Cañoneros	1 – 7 (A)	10 October 2026	7
(Mexico) Ryan Olvera	Calor	Cañoneros	1 – 7 (A)	10 October 2026	7
(Mexico) Osmar Duarte	Guerreros del Pacífico	Real Refineros CDS	3 – 3 (A)	17 October 2026	8
(Mexico) Farid Patjane	Dragones de Oaxaca	Héroes de Zaci	6 – 0 (H)	24 October 2026	9
(Mexico) Fabián Salas	Santiago	Real Refineros CDS	6 – 0 (H)	26 October 2026	9
(Mexico) Ariel Morán	Saltillo Soccer	Ciervos	7 – 2 (H)	7 November 2026	11
(Mexico) Octavio Díaz^{4}	La Tribu de Ciudad Juárez	Cañoneros	8 – 0 (H)	7 November 2026	11
(Mexico) Even Padilla	La Tribu de Ciudad Juárez	Cañoneros	8 – 0 (H)	7 November 2026	11
(Mexico) Víctor Sánchez	Acámbaro	Héroes de Zaci	5 – 1 (H)	15 November 2026	12
(Mexico) Gianni Rubli	UAT Premier	Cañoneros	4 – 0 (H)	21 November 2026	13

^{4} Player scored four goals
^{5} Player scored five goals
(H) – Home; (A) – Away

=== Attendance ===
Pos	Team	Total	High	Low	Average	Change
1	Vaqueros Reynosa	5,586	2,086	1,500	1,862	n/a^{4}
2	Guerreros del Pacífico	2,500	2,500	785	1,643	+386.1%^{6}
3	Saltillo Soccer	4,870	2,000	1,050	1,623	n/a^{3}
4	Real Refineros CDS	3,550	2,000	50	1,183	n/a^{4,11}
5	ACF Zapotlanejo	2,510	1,700	560	837	+172.6%^{10}
6	La Tribu de Ciudad Juárez	1,900	1,000	400	633	n/a^{3}
7	Delfines de Coatzacoalcos	1,190	690	447	546	n/a^{3,9}
8	Halcones Negros	1,600	700	300	533	n/a^{3}
9	Guerreros de Autlán	1,359	500	411	453	−19.5%
10	Acámbaro	670	530	330	400	+31.6%^{2}
11	UAT Premier	1,337	601	204	334	+57.5%
12	Real Apodaca	783	473	150	261	+23.1%
13	Dragones de Oaxaca	783	483	100	261	−37.3%^{2}
14	Artesanos Metepec	628	328	100	209	+6.1%^{2}
15	Santiago	603	250	150	201	−0.5%
16	Ciervos	480	180	100	120	−12.4%
17	Cañoneros	200	150	50	100	−49.5%^{1,8}
18	Héroes de Zaci	100	100	100	100	−67.0%^{7,12}
19	Calor	100	100	100	100	−96.2%^{5,13}
20	Mineros de Fresnillo	202	80	30	51	−31.1%
	League total	32,713	2,500	30	574	−33.4%

Source: Liga Premier FMF
Notes:
Only regular season listed:
1: The team played at least one match behind closed doors
2: Team played Liga Premier – Serie B last season.
3: Team played Liga TDP last season.
4: Team did not play last season.
5: Calor played last season at Reynosa.
6: Guerreros del Pacífico played last season as Avispones de Chilpancingo.
7: Héroes de Zaci played last season at Texcoco and Toluca.
8: Cañoneros played last season at Xalapa.
9: Delfines de Coatzacoalcos played some matches at Estadio Luis "Pirata" Fuente, Veracruz.
10: ACF Zapotlanejo played one match at Estadio Gregorio "Tepa" Gómez, Tepatitlán.
11: Real Refineros CDS played one match at Instalaciones FMF, Toluca.
12: Héroes de Zaci played one match at Instalaciones FMF, Toluca.
13: Calor played one match at Estadio Arreola, Chalco.

== See also ==
- 2026–27 Liga MX season
- 2026–27 Liga de Expansión MX season
- 2026–27 Primera Premier season
- 2026–27 Liga Premier B season
- 2026–27 Liga TDP season
