= List of stadiums in Mexico =

The following is a list of stadiums in Mexico. They are ordered by capacity, which is the maximum number of spectators the stadium can accommodate. All Mexican stadiums with a current capacity of 10,000 or more are included in the list.

== Existing stadiums ==
#	Stadium	Capacity	City	State	Year opened	Type	Tenants	Image
1	Azteca	81,070	Tlalpan	Mexico City	1966	Multi-purpose	América, Atlante, Cruz Azul Mexico	Estadio Azteca
2	Olímpico Universitario	58,445	Coyoacán	Mexico City	1952	Multi-purpose	UNAM, Pumas CU	Estadio Olímpico Universitario
3	Jalisco	55,020	Guadalajara	Jalisco	1960	Football	Atlas, Leones Negros UdeG	Estadio Jalisco
4	BBVA	51,348	Guadalupe	Nuevo León	2015	Football	CF Monterrey	Estadio BBVA
5	Cuauhtémoc	47,417	Puebla City	Puebla	1968	Football	Club Puebla	Estadio Cuauhtémoc
6	Akron	46,232	Zapopan	Jalisco	2010	Football	CD Guadalajara	Estadio Akron
7	Universitario	41,886	San Nicolás de los Garza	Nuevo León	1967	Football	Tigres UANL	Estadio Universitario
8	Plaza México	41,262	Benito Juárez	Mexico City	1946	Bullfighting	—	Plaza México
9	Morelos	34,795	Morelia	Michoacán	1989	Football	Atlético Morelia	Estadio Morelos
10	Corregidora	34,107	Querétaro City	Querétaro	1985	Football	Querétaro FC	Estadio Corregidora
11	Ciudad de los Deportes	33,000	Benito Juárez	Mexico City	1946	Football	–	Estadio Ciudad de los Deportes
12	Universitario Alberto "Chivo" Córdoba	32,603	Toluca	Mexico	1964	Football	–	Estadio Universitario Alberto "Chivo" Córdoba
13	León	31,297	León	Guanajuato	1967	Football	Club León	Estadio León
14	Corona	29,101	Torreón	Coahuila	2009	Football	Santos Laguna	Estadio Corona
15	Víctor Manuel Reyna	29,001	Tuxtla Gutiérrez	Chiapas	1982	Football	Jaguares F.C.	Estadio Víctor Manuel Reyna
16	Luis "Pirata" Fuente	27,500	Boca del Río	Veracruz	1967	Football	Piratas FC	Estadio Luis "Pirata" Fuente
17	Nemesio Díez	27,273	Toluca	Mexico	1954	Football	Deportivo Toluca	Estadio Nemesio Díez
18	Caliente	26,158	Tijuana	Baja California	2007	Football	Club Tijuana	Estadio Caliente
19	GNP Seguros	26,000	Iztacalco	Mexico City	1993	Multi-purpose	—	Estadio GNP Seguros
20	Hidalgo	25,922	Pachuca	Hidalgo	1993	Football	CF Pachuca	Estadio Hidalgo
21	Libertad Financiera	25,709	San Luis Potosí City	San Luis Potosí	1999	Football	Atlético San Luis	Estadio Alfonso Lastras
22	Sergio León Chávez	25,000	Irapuato	Guanajuato	1969	Football	CD Irapuato	Estadio Sergio León Chávez
23	Agustín "Coruco" Díaz	24,313	Zacatepec	Morelos	1964	Football	Selva Cañera	Estadio Agustín "Coruco" Díaz
24	Victoria	23,851	Aguascalientes City	Aguascalientes	2003	Football	Necaxa	Estadio Victoria
25	Miguel Alemán Valdés	23,182	Celaya	Guanajuato	1954	Football	Atlético Celaya, Lobos ULMX	Estadio Miguel Alemán Valdés
26	Walmart Park	22,061	Monterrey	Nuevo León	1990	Baseball	Sultanes de Monterrey	Estadio Mobil Super
27	Olímpico Universitario José Reyes Baeza	22,000	Chihuahua City	Chihuahua	2007	Multi-purpose	Caudillos de Chihuahua, Águilas UACH	Estadio Olímpico Universitario José Reyes Baeza
28	El Hogar	22,000	Matamoros	Tamaulipas	2016	Football	–	Estadio El Hogar
29	Ignacio Zaragoza	22,000	Puebla City	Puebla	1952	Football	Guerreros de Puebla	Estadio Ignacio Zaragoza
30	Bullring by the Sea	21,621	Tijuana	Baja California	1960	Bullfighting	—	Bullring by the Sea
31	Alfredo Harp Helú	20,576	Iztacalco	Mexico City	2019	Baseball	Diablos Rojos del México	Estadio Alfredo Harp Helú
32	El Encanto	20,195	Mazatlán	Sinaloa	2020	Football	Dorados de Sinaloa	Estadio El Encanto
33	Dorados	20,108	Culiacán	Sinaloa	2003	Football	—	Estadio Dorados
34	Carlos Vega Villalba	20,068	Zacatecas	Zacatecas	1986	Football	Mineros de Zacatecas, Mineros de Fresnillo	Estadio Carlos Vega Villalba
35	Tomateros	20,000	Culiacán	Sinaloa	2015	Baseball	Tomateros de Culiacán	Estadio Tomateros
36	Neza 86	20,000	Nezahualcóyotl	Mexico	1981	Football	—	Estadio Neza 86
37	Olímpico Benito Juárez	19,703	Ciudad Juárez	Chihuahua	1981	Football	FC Juárez	
38	Tamaulipas	19,668	Tampico & Ciudad Madero ^{Note A}	Tamaulipas	1966	Football	Jaiba Brava	Estadio Tamaulipas
39	Universitario BUAP	19,283	Puebla City	Puebla	1992	Multi-purpose	—	
40	Andrés Quintana Roo	18,844	Cancún	Quintana Roo	2007	Football	Cancún FC	Estadio Andrés Quintana Roo
41	3 de Marzo	18,779	Zapopan	Jalisco	1971	Multi-purpose	–	Estadio Tres de Marzo
42	Héroe de Nacozari	18,747	Hermosillo	Sonora	1985	Football	–	Estadio Héroe de Nacozari
43	Olímpico de Tapachula	18,017	Tapachula	Chiapas	1988	Football	Tapachula	Estadio Olímpico de Tapachula
44	Francisco Zarco	18,000	Durango City	Durango	1957	Football	Alacranes de Durango	Estadio Francisco Zarco
45	Venustiano Carranza	17,600	Morelia	Michoacán	1968	Football	Purépechas	Estadio Venustiano Carranza
46	Farmacias Sta. Mónica	17,000	Mexicali	Baja California	1976	Baseball	Águilas de Mexicali	Estadio Farmacias Sta. Mónica
47	Toros Mobil Park	17,000	Tijuana	Baja California	1977	Baseball	Toros de Tijuana	Toros Mobil Park
48	Plaza Nuevo Progreso	16,561	Guadalajara	Jalisco	1967	Bullfighting	—	Plaza Nuevo Progreso
49	Panamericano	16,500	Zapopan	Jalisco	2011	Baseball	Charros de Jalisco	Panamericano
50	Parque Kukulcán Alamo	16,000	Mérida	Yucatán	1982	Baseball	Leones de Yucatán	Parque Kukulcán
51	Plaza de Toros Monumental de Aguascalientes	16,000	Aguascalientes	Aguascalientes	1974	Bullfighting	—	Plaza Monumental
52	Francisco I. Madero	16,000	Saltillo	Coahuila	1964	Baseball	Saraperos de Saltillo, Dinos de Saltillo	Estadio Francisco I. Madero
53	Gaspar Mass	16,000	San Nicolás de los Garza	Nuevo León	1979	American football	Auténticos Tigres UANL	Estadio Gaspar Mass
54	Mariano Matamoros	16,000	Xochitepec	Morelos	1981	Football	Zacatepec F.C.	Estadio Mariano Matamoros
55	Sonora	16,000	Hermosillo	Sonora	2013	Baseball	Naranjeros de Hermosillo	Estadio Sonora
56	Teodoro Mariscal	16,000	Mazatlán	Sinaloa	1962	Baseball	Venados de Mazatlán	Estadio Teodoro Mariscal
57	Yaquis	16,000	Ciudad Obregón	Sonora	2016	Baseball	Yaquis de Obregón	
58	Carlos Iturralde	15,087	Mérida	Yucatán	1987	Football	Venados	Estadio Carlos Iturralde
59	Unidad Deportiva Solidaridad	15,000	Reynosa	Tamaulipas	2013	Football	Vaqueros Reynosa, Guerreros Reynosa	Estadio Reynosa
60	Héctor Espino	15,000	Hermosillo	Sonora	1972	Baseball	—	Estadio Héctor Espino
61	Juárez Vive	15,000	Ciudad Juárez	Chihuahua	2013	Baseball	Indios de Ciudad Juárez	
62	Gustavo Pacheco Villaseñor	15,000	Tuxtepec	Oaxaca	2023	Football	Conejos de Tuxtepec, Racing de Veracruz	Estadio Gustavo Pacheco Villaseñor
63	Centenario	14,800	Cuernavaca	Morelos	1969	Football	Cruz Azul (women)	Estadio Centenario de Cuernavaca
64	Tecnológico de Oaxaca	14,598	Oaxaca City	Oaxaca	2016	Football	Alebrijes de Oaxaca, Dragones de Oaxaca	Estadio Tecnológico de Oaxaca
65	Monumental Chihuahua	14,500	Chihuahua City	Chihuahua	2004	Baseball	Dorados de Chihuahua	Estadio Monumental de Chihuahua
66	Juan N. López	13,356	La Piedad	Michoacán	1994	Football	CF La Piedad	Estadio Juan N. López
67	Unidad Deportiva Acapulco	13,000	Acapulco	Guerrero	1975	Football	Guerreros del Pacífico	Unidad Deportiva Acapulco
68	Wilfrido Massieu	13,000	Gustavo A. Madero	Mexico City	1959	American football	Águilas Blancas IPN, Burros Blancos IPN	Estadio Wilfrido Massieu
69	IAETAC	13,000	Tecomán	Colima	1970	Football	—	
70	Nicolás Álvarez Ortega	12,271	Tepic	Nayarit	2011	Football	Tigres de Álica	Estadio Arena Cora
71	Hermanos Serdán	12,112	Puebla City	Puebla	1973	Baseball	Pericos de Puebla	Estadio Hermanos Serdán
72	Xalapeño	12,000	Xalapa	Veracruz	1926	Multi-purpose	—	Estadio Xalapeño
73	Olímpico de Villahermosa	12,000	Villahermosa	Tabasco	1964	Football	Napoli Tabasco, Plataneros de Tabasco	Estadio Olímpico de Villahermosa
74	Beisborama 72	12,000	Córdoba	Veracruz	1972	Baseball	—	
75	Colima	12,000	Colima City	Colima	1976	Football	–	Estadio Colima
76	Olímpico Universitario de Colima	11,812	Colima City	Colima	1994	Football	Loros UdeC	Estadio Universitario de Colima
77	Manuel "Ciclón" Echeverría	11,500	Navojoa	Sonora	1970	Baseball	—	
78	Tlahuicole	11,135	Tlaxcala City	Tlaxcala	1961	Football	Tlaxcala FC	Estadio Tlahuicole
79	Centenario	11,134	Los Mochis	Sinaloa	2003	Football	—	Estadio Centenario Mochis
80	Chevron Park	11,000	Los Mochis	Sinaloa	1947	Baseball	Cañeros de Los Mochis	
81	Marte R. Gómez	10,520	Ciudad Victoria	Tamaulipas	1939	Multi-purpose	Correcaminos UAT	Estadio Marte R. Gómez
82	Yu'va	10,500	Oaxaca City	Oaxaca	2026	Baseball	Guerreros de Oaxaca	
83	Banorte	10,057	Monterrey	Nuevo León	2019	American football	Fundidores de Monterrey, Borregos Salvajes Monterrey	Estadio Borregos
84	Ignacio López Rayón	10,000	Zitácuaro	Michoacán	1980	Football	–	Estadio Ignacio López Rayón
85	Heriberto Jara Corona	10,000	Poza Rica	Veracruz	1969	Football	Piratas Poza Rica	Estadio Heriberto Jara Corona
86	Sección XXIV	10,000	Salamanca	Guanajuato	1951	Football	Real Refineros CDS	Estadio Sección XXIV
87	Adolfo López Mateos	10,000	Reynosa	Tamaulipas	1962	Baseball	—	Estadio Adolfo López Mateos

Notes

- Tamaulipas: The halfway line of the pitch at Estadio Tamaulipas lies along the border of Tampico and Madero with the northern half of the pitch belonging to Tampico and the southern half to Madero.

== Proposed stadiums ==
Rank	Stadium	Capacity	City	State	Type	Tenant	Estimated Cost	Status	Inauguration
1	Nuevo Estadio Tigres	65,000	San Nicolás de los Garza	Nuevo León	Football	Tigres UANL	USD$320 million	In development	TBA
2	New Cruz Azul Stadium	45,000	Mexico City		Football	Cruz Azul	USD$300 million	In development	TBA
3	Estadio Ciudad UdeG	40,000	Zapopan	Jalisco	Football	Atlas, Leones Negros UdeG	US$275 million	In development	2030 (projected)

== See also ==
- List of football stadiums in Mexico
- List of indoor arenas in Mexico
- List of stadiums
