= Liga Premier A =

- Organising body: Mexican Football Federation
- Founded: 2008; 18 years ago as Liga Premier de Ascenso
- Country: Mexico
- Number of clubs: 20 (2 groups)
- Level on pyramid: 3
- Promotion to: Primera Premier
- Relegation to: Premier B
- Current champions: Deportiva Venados (1st title)
- Most championships: Loros UdeC; Tampico Madero; Universidad del Fútbol (3 titles each)
- Broadcasters: AYM Sports; Hi Sports; Televisa (Note: Includes Adrenalina Sports Network.); TVC Deportes (Note: Includes TVC Deportes 2.)
- Website: Official website
- Current: 2026–27 Liga Premier A season

Liga Premier A is a professional association football league in Mexico, part of the Liga Premier as the secondary subdivision in the third level of the Mexican football league system. The league is contested by 20 participating clubs with an intermediate infrastructure, divided into two groups by geographic location (each group with 10 clubs). The champions are decided by a final knockout phase and aspire to participate in Primera Premier, if they meet all infrastructure and economic stability requirements.

Formerly known as Liga Premier de Ascenso (2008–2017) and Liga Premier Serie A (2017–2026). From 2008 to 2026, it was the major subdivision for clubs with the best economic and sporting infrastructure, and the winners were crowned champions of the Liga Premier.

== History ==
The Liga Premier de Ascenso was created in the second half of 2008, with the participation and approval of the owners of the clubs in the Second and Third Division. In 2017, the subdivision was rebranded as Liga Premier Serie A.

In 2026, it was renamed as Premier A. Furthermore, this category lost its status as the main branch of the Liga Premier after the creation of the Primera Premier. Therefore, since that season, Premier A has included clubs considered to be of middle class, meaning they could aspire to promotion to Liga de Expansión MX in the medium term.

As of the 2026–27 season Correcaminos UAT and Mineros de Zacatecas all from Liga de Expansión MX, will join the Liga Premier to give young players professional experience.

== Stadiums and locations ==
=== 2026–27 season ===
The 2026–27 Liga Premier A season has the following 20 participating clubs.

Locations of Premier A clubs in the 2026–27 season.
Group 1
Group 2

=== Group 1 ===
Club	Manager	City	Stadium	Capacity
Autlán	(Mexico) Sergio Díaz	Autlán	Unidad Deportiva Chapultepec	1,500
Héroes de Zaci	(Mexico) Enrique Garza	Nuevo Laredo	Unidad Deportiva Benito Juárez	5,000
La Tribu de Ciudad Juárez	(Mexico) Jorge Villa	Ciudad Juárez	8 de Diciembre	4,050
Mineros de Fresnillo (Note: Team affiliated with Mineros de Zacatecas.)	(Mexico) Jorge Horta	Zacatecas	Carlos Vega Villalba	20,777
Real Apodaca	(Mexico) Ricardo Rayas	Apodaca	Centenario del Ejército Mexicano	2,000
Saltillo Soccer	(Mexico) Joel de León	Saltillo	Olímpico Francisco I. Madero	7,000
Santiago	(Mexico) Martín Moreno	Allende	La Capilla Soccer Park (Note: The club also plays some matches at the Cancha FCD El Barrial, Santiago, Nuevo León)	1,000
Correcaminos Premier (Note: Team affiliated with Correcaminos UAT.)	(Mexico) Jorge Urbina	Ciudad Victoria	Eugenio Alvizo Porras (Note: The club also plays some matches at the Estadio Marte R. Gómez)	5,000
Vaqueros Reynosa	(Mexico) Marco Angúlo	Reynosa	Unidad Deportiva Solidaridad	15,000
Zapotlanejo	(Mexico) Jorge Mora	Zapotlanejo	Miguel Hidalgo (Note: The team played some of its home matches of the season at the Estadio Gregorio "Tepa" Gómez in Tepatitlán because the Estadio Miguel Hidalgo was damaged by flooding following a storm in the city.)	1,800

=== Group 2 ===
Club	Manager	City	Stadium	Capacity
Acámbaro	(Mexico) Francisco Tena	Acámbaro	Fray Salvador Rangel	3,500
Artesanos Metepec	(Mexico) Gustavo Contreras	Metepec	Unidad Deportiva Alarcón Hisojo	2,000
Calor	(Mexico) Ismael Íñiguez	Chalco de Díaz Covarrubias	Arreola	3,217
Cañoneros	(Mexico) David Zaragoza	Mexico City	Momoxco	3,500
Ciervos	Vacant	Chalco de Díaz Covarrubias	Arreola	3,217
Delfines de Coatzacoalcos	(Mexico) Iván Liévano	Coatzacoalcos	Rafael Hernández Ochoa (Note: The team played its first home matches of the season at the Estadio Luis "Pirata" Fuente in Veracruz, due to renovation work at the Estadio Rafael Hernández Ochoa.)	4,800
Dragones de Oaxaca	(Mexico) Víctor Hernández	Oaxaca	Tecnológico de Oaxaca	14,950
Guerreros del Pacífico	(Mexico) Arturo Juárez	Acapulco	Unidad Deportiva Acapulco	13,000
Halcones Negros	(Mexico) Oscar Lintón	Texcoco	Municipal Claudio Suárez	4,000
Real Refineros CDS	(Chile) Héctor Mancilla	Salamanca	Sección XXIV	10,000

=== On hiatus ===
Club	Manager	City	Stadium	Capacity
Colima	(Mexico) Juan Cordero (interim)	Colima	Colima	12,000
Deportivo Zitácuaro	(Mexico) Mario Trejo	Zitácuaro	Ignacio López Rayón	10,000
Dragones Toluca	Vacant	Zinacantepec	Unidad Cultural SNTE Sección 17	1,000
Ensenada	(Mexico) José Monzón	Ensenada	Municipal de Ensenada	7,600
Gavilanes de Matamoros	Vacant	Matamoros	El Hogar	22,000
Halcones	Vacant	Uruapan	Unidad Deportiva Hermanos López Rayón	5,000
Neza	(Mexico) Ignacio Negrete	Ciudad Nezahualcóyotl	Municipal Claudio Suárez	4,000
Cimarrones de Sonora	Vacant	Hermosillo	Héroe de Nacozari	18,747
Sporting Canamy	(Mexico) Juan Carlos Rico	Oaxtepec	Olímpico de Oaxtepec	9,000
Tecos	Vacant	Zapopan	Tres de Marzo	18,779
Tuzos UAZ	(Mexico) Rubén Hernández	Zacatecas	Carlos Vega Villalba	20,068
Leones Negros Premier (Note: Affiliated team with Leones Negros UdeG.)	(Mexico) Jairo González	Zapopan	Club Deportivo UdeG Cancha 3	3,000

== Changes ==
=== Offseason ===
- On 18 April 2026, Artesanos Metepec was promoted from Premier B to Premier A.
- On 27 April 2026, Avispones de Chilpancingo was relocated to Acapulco and renamed Guerreros del Pacífico.
- On 23 May 2026, Delfines de Coatzacoalcos was promoted from Liga TDP to Premier A.
- On 24 May 2026, Saltillo Soccer was promoted from Liga TDP to Premier A.
- On 24 May 2026, La Tribu de Ciudad Juárez was promoted from Liga TDP to Liga Premier. On August 1, 2026 La Tribu joined to Premier A as an expansion team.
- On 3 June 2026, Tecos went on hiatus due to a financial restructuring of the club and the lack of a stadium suitable for the league.
- On 12 June 2026, Alacranes de Durango, the 2025–26 season runner–up, was promoted to Liga de Expansión MX as a guest team. Since the season champion, Deportiva Venados, failed to meet the requirements to be promoted.
- On 16 June 2026, Dragones de Oaxaca announced that they successfully passed the financial and sporting certification, and were therefore accepted into Premier A.
- On 1 July 2026, Gavilanes de Matamoros went on hiatus due to financial problems.
- On 1 July 2026, Calor announced its departure from Reynosa due to breach of contract by the administration that managed the club in the city. On 24 July, the club was relocated to Oaxtepec, Morelos.
- On 8 July 2026, Dragones Toluca went on hiatus due to a restructuring of the club.
- On 8 July 2026, Acámbaro announced that they successfully passed the financial and sporting certification, and were therefore accepted into Premier A.
- On 9 July 2026, Deportivo Zitácuaro went on hiatus because the club is looking to relaunch its sports project by focusing on local players, taking a year as a break to strengthen its local squad.
- On 1 August 2026, Atlético Celaya, Chapulineros de Oaxaca, Cordobés, Deportiva Venados, Inter Playa del Carmen, Jaguares, La Piedad, Lobos ULMX, Los Cabos United, Montañeses, Pioneros de Cancún, Racing de Veracruz, Tapachula, Tigres de Álica, Tritones Vallarta and Zacatepec were promoted from Liga Premier A to Primera Premier as the teams in that branch with the best conditions to qualify for promotion to Liga de Expansión MX.
- On 1 August 2026, Colima, Cimarrones de Sonora, Ensenada, Neza, Sporting Canamy, Tuzos UAZ and Leones Negros UdeG Premier went on hiatus due to financial problems or restructuring.
- On 1 August 2026, Atlético Hidalgo was moved to Premier B.
- On 1 August 2026, Halcones Negros, Real Refineros CDS and Vaqueros Reynosa joined the league as expansion teams.
- On 10 August 2026, Halcones went on hiatus because the team was unable to find a stadium suited to its interests.
- On 10 August 2026, Héroes de Zaci was relocated from Mexico City to Nuevo Laredo, after the team attempted to establish itself in Reynosa but was unable to use a suitable sports facility in the city.
- On 12 August 2026, Cañoneros announced that it would be relocated from Xalapa to Progreso Industrial, State of Mexico. However, the proposed stadium did not pass the league's review, so the team ultimately established its home ground at Estadio Momoxco in Milpa Alta, Mexico City.

=== Regular season ===
- On 8 October 2026, Calor was relocated from Oaxtepec to Chalco due to administrative issues.

== See also ==
- Sport in Mexico
- Football in Mexico
- Mexican football league system
- Mexican Football Federation
- Liga Premier
- Primera Premier
- Liga Premier B
- Copa Conecta
- Copa Promesas MX
