= List of football stadiums in Mexico =

The following is a list of association football stadiums in Mexico. Currently stadiums with a capacity of 10,000 or more are included.

== Current stadiums ==
#	Image	Stadium	Capacity	City	State	Home team	Surface	Opened	Owner	League (tier)
1		Azteca	87,000	Tlalpan	Mexico City	América, Atlante, Cruz Azul, Mexico	Grass	1966	Grupo Televisa	Liga MX
2		Olímpico Universitario	69,000	Coyoacán	Mexico City	UNAM	Grass	1952	UNAM	Liga MX
3		Jalisco	53,937	Guadalajara	Jalisco	Atlas, Leones Negros UdeG	Grass	1960	Clubes Unidos de Jalisco	Liga MX, Liga de Expansión MX
4		BBVA	51,348	Guadalupe	Nuevo León	CF Monterrey	Grass	2015	FEMSA	Liga MX
5		Cuauhtémoc	47,417	Puebla City	Puebla	Club Puebla	Grass	1968	State of Puebla	Liga MX
6		Akron	46,232	Zapopan	Jalisco	CD Guadalajara	Grass	2010	Grupo Omnilife	Liga MX
7		Universitario	41,886	San Nicolás de los Garza	Nuevo León	Tigres UANL	Grass	1967	UANL	Liga MX
8		Morelos	34,795	Morelia	Michoacán	Atlético Morelia	Grass	1989	State of Michoacán	Liga de Expansión MX
9		Corregidora	34,107	Querétaro City	Querétaro	Querétaro F.C.	Grass	1985	State of Querétaro	Liga MX
10		Ciudad de los Deportes	33,000	Benito Juárez	Mexico City	–	Grass	1946	OCESA	–
11		Universitario Alberto "Chivo" Córdoba	32,000	Toluca	Mexico	–	Grass	1964	UAEM	–
12		León	31,297	León	Guanajuato	Club León	Grass	1967	Grupo Pachuca	Liga MX
13		Corona	29,101	Torreón	Coahuila	Santos Laguna	Grass	2009	Orlegi Sports	Liga MX
14		Víctor Manuel Reyna	29,001	Tuxtla Gutiérrez	Chiapas	Jaguares	Grass	1982	State of Chiapas	Liga Premier
15		Luis "Pirata" Fuente	27,500	Boca del Río	Veracruz	Piratas	Grass	1967	State of Veracruz	Liga de Expansión MX
16		Caliente	27,333	Tijuana	Baja California	Club Tijuana	Artificial turf	2007	Grupo Caliente	Liga MX
17		Nemesio Díez	30,000	Toluca	Mexico	Deportivo Toluca	Grass	1954	Valentín Díez Morodo	Liga MX
18		Hidalgo	25,922	Pachuca	Hidalgo	CF Pachuca	Grass	1993	State of Hidalgo	Liga MX
19		Libertad Financiera	25,709	San Luis Potosí City	San Luis Potosí	Atlético San Luis	Grass	1999	Atlético de Madrid del Potosí S.A. de C.V.	Liga MX
20		Sergio León Chávez	25,000	Irapuato	Guanajuato	CD Irapuato	Grass	1969	City of Irapuato	Liga Premier
21		Agustín "Coruco" Díaz	24,313	Zacatepec	Morelos	Selva Cañera	Grass	1964	State of Morelos	Liga TDP
22		Victoria	23,851	Aguascalientes City	Aguascalientes	Necaxa	Grass	2003	State of Aguascalientes	Liga MX
23		Miguel Alemán Valdés	23,182	Celaya	Guanajuato	Atlético Celaya, Lobos ULMX	Grass	1954	City of Celaya	Liga Premier
24		Olímpico Universitario José Reyes Baeza	22,000	Chihuahua City	Chihuahua	—	Artificial turf	2007	UACH	—
25		El Hogar	22,000	Matamoros	Tamaulipas	–	Artificial turf	2016	City of Matamoros	–
26		Ignacio Zaragoza	22,000	Puebla City	Puebla	—	Grass	1952	State of Puebla	—
27		El Encanto	20,195	Mazatlán	Sinaloa	Dorados de Sinaloa	Grass	2020	State of Sinaloa	Liga de Expansión MX
28		Dorados	20,108	Culiacán	Sinaloa	—	Grass	2003	State of Sinaloa	—
29		Carlos Vega Villalba	20,068	Zacatecas	Zacatecas	Mineros de Zacatecas, Mineros de Fresnillo	Grass	1986	State of Zacatecas	Liga de Expansión MX, Liga Premier
30		Neza 86	20,000	Nezahualcóyotl	Mexico	—	Grass	1981	UTN	—
31		Olímpico Benito Juárez	19,703	Ciudad Juárez	Chihuahua	FC Juárez	Grass	1981	UACJ	Liga MX
32		Tamaulipas	19,667	Tampico & Ciudad Madero ^{Note A}	Tamaulipas	Jaiba Brava	Grass	1966	STPRM	Liga de Expansión MX
33		Universitario BUAP	19,283	Puebla City	Puebla	—	Grass	1992	BUAP	—
34		Andrés Quintana Roo	18,844	Cancún	Quintana Roo	Cancún FC	Grass	2007	State of Quintana Roo	Liga de Expansión MX
35		3 de Marzo	18,779	Zapopan	Jalisco	–	Grass	1971	UAG	–
36		Héroe de Nacozari	18,747	Hermosillo	Sonora	–	Artificial turf	1985	State of Sonora	–
37		Olímpico de Tapachula	18,017	Tapachula	Chiapas	Tapachula Soconusco F.C.	Grass	1988	City of Tapachula	Liga Premier
38		Francisco Zarco	18,000	Durango City	Durango	Alacranes de Durango	Grass	1957	State of Durango	Liga de Expansión MX
39		Venustiano Carranza	17,600	Morelia	Michoacán	Purépechas FC	Grass	1968	State of Michoacán	Liga Premier
40		Mariano Matamoros	16,000	Xochitepec	Morelos	Zacatepec	Grass	1981	City of Xochitepec	Liga Premier
41		Carlos Iturralde	15,087	Mérida	Yucatán	Venados	Grass	1987	State of Yucatán	Liga de Expansión MX
42		Unidad Deportiva Solidaridad	15,000	Reynosa	Tamaulipas	Vaqueros Reynosa, Guerreros Reynosa	Grass	2013	City of Reynosa	Liga Premier, Liga TDP
43		Gustavo Pacheco Villaseñor	15,000	Tuxtepec	Oaxaca	Racing de Veracruz, Conejos de Tuxtepec	Grass	2023	Diego Francisco Pacheco Cruz	Liga Premier, Liga TDP
44		Centenario	14,800	Cuernavaca	Morelos	Cruz Azul (women)	Grass	1969	State of Morelos	Liga MX Femenil
45		Tecnológico de Oaxaca	14,598	Oaxaca City	Oaxaca	Alebrijes de Oaxaca, Dragones de Oaxaca	Grass	2016	Oaxaca Institute of Technology	Liga de Expansión MX, Liga Premier
46		Juan N. López	13,356	La Piedad	Michoacán	CF La Piedad	Grass	1994	Board of Estadio Juan N. López	Liga Premier
47		Unidad Deportiva Acapulco	13,000	Acapulco	Guerrero	Guerreros del Pacífico	Grass	1975	City of Acapulco	Liga Premier
48		IAETAC	13,000	Tecomán	Colima	—	Grass	1970	UAG	—
49		Nicolás Álvarez Ortega	12,271	Tepic	Nayarit	Tigres de Álica F.C.	Grass	2011	State of Nayarit	Liga Premier
50		Olímpico de Villahermosa	12,000	Villahermosa	Tabasco	Napoli Tabasco, Plataneros de Tabasco	Grass	1964	State of Tabasco	Liga TDP
51		Colima	12,000	Colima City	Colima	–	Grass	1976	State of Colima	Liga Premier
52		Olímpico Universitario de Colima	11,812	Colima City	Colima	Loros UdeC	Grass	1994	University of Colima	–
53		Tlahuicole	11,135	Tlaxcala City	Tlaxcala	Tlaxcala FC	Grass	1961	State of Tlaxcala	Liga de Expansión MX
54		Centenario	11,134	Los Mochis	Sinaloa	—	Grass	2003	City of Ahome	—
55		Marte R. Gómez	10,520	Ciudad Victoria	Tamaulipas	Correcaminos UAT	Grass	1939	State of Tamaulipas	Liga de Expansión MX
56		Ignacio López Rayón	10,000	Zitácuaro	Michoacán	–	Grass	1980	City of Zitácuaro	Liga TDP
57		Heriberto Jara Corona	10,000	Poza Rica	Veracruz	Piratas Poza Rica	Grass	1969	City of Poza Rica	Liga Premier
58		Sección XXIV	10,000	Salamanca	Guanajuato	Real Refineros CDS	Grass	1951	City of Salamanca	Liga Premier

Notes

- Tamaulipas: The halfway line of the pitch at Estadio Tamaulipas lies along the border of Tampico and Madero with the northern half of the pitch belonging to Tampico and the southern half to Madero.

== Proposed stadiums ==
Rank	Stadium	Capacity	City	State	Type	Tenant	Estimated Cost	Status	Inauguration
1	Nuevo Estadio Tigres	65,000	San Nicolás de los Garza	Nuevo León	Football	Tigres UANL	US$320 million	In development	TBA
2	New Cruz Azul Stadium	45,000	Mexico City		Football	Cruz Azul	US$300 million	In development	TBA
3	Estadio Ciudad UdeG	40,000	Zapopan	Jalisco	Football	Atlas, Leones Negros UdeG	US$275 million	In development	2030 (projected)

== See also ==
- List of stadiums in Mexico
- List of indoor arenas in Mexico
- List of North American stadiums by capacity
- List of association football stadiums by capacity
- List of association football stadiums by country
- List of sports venues by capacity
- Lists of stadiums
