= Cristian Oviedo =

Cristian Oviedo may refer to:

- Cristian Oviedo (Costa Rican footballer) (born 1978), Costa Rican football defensive midfielder
- Cristián Oviedo (Chilean footballer) (born 1980), Chilean football centre-back
