= Halcones Negros F.C. =

Mexican football club

Halcones Negros
- Full name: Halcones Negros Fútbol Club
- Nickname: Los Halcones Negros (The Black Falcons)
- Founded: August 2018; 8 years ago
- Ground: Estadio Municipal Claudio Suárez; Texcoco, State of Mexico
- Capacity: 4,000
- Manager: Oscar Linton
- League: Liga Premier (Premier A)
- 2026–27: Pre–season
| Home colours | Away colours |

Halcones Negros Fútbol Club is a Mexican football club based in Texcoco, State of Mexico that competes in the Premier A, the intermediate branch of the Liga Premier de México, the third level division of Mexican football.

== History ==
The club was founded in August 2018 in Mexico City and was registered in the Liga TDP, the bottom division level of Mexican football, for its inaugural season. The team remained in the league from its creation through the 2025–26 season, during which it achieved its best performance by reaching the promotion play-off quarter-finals.

During its early years, the club was notable for not having a fixed home base, as it changed municipalities each season based on offers from various local governments in the eastern region of the State of Mexico; consequently, it played home matches in Chicoloapan, Papalotla, and Texcoco, where it finally managed to establish itself permanently and strengthened its project.

In August 2026, Halcones Negros was promoted to the Liga Premier de México, the third division level of Mexican football, after acquiring an expansion franchise.

== Players ==
=== First-team squad ===
As of 9 September 2026

Note: Flags indicate national team as defined under FIFA eligibility rules; some limited exceptions apply. Players may hold more than one non-FIFA nationality.

| No. | Pos. | Nation | Player |
|---|---|---|---|
| 1 | GK | MEX | Gaddiel Carvajal |
| 2 | DF | MEX | Santiago López |
| 3 | DF | MEX | Isaác Gómez |
| 4 | DF | MEX | Ángel Garibay |
| 5 | DF | MEX | Joaquín Torres |
| 6 | MF | MEX | Diego García |
| 7 | MF | MEX | Jonathan Martínez |
| 8 | MF | MEX | Oliver Almaraz |
| 9 | FW | MEX | Alexis Rodríguez |
| 10 | MF | MEX | Ángel González |
| 11 | DF | MEX | Adrián Victoria |
| 12 | GK | MEX | Santiago Ruelas |
| 13 | MF | MEX | Jafet Vázquez |
| 14 | DF | MEX | Juan Espíndola |
| 15 | DF | MEX | Kevin Santoyo |
| 16 | MF | MEX | Michael Torres |
| 17 | FW | MEX | Diego Coyotecatl |
| 18 | GK | MEX | Denzel Onofre |

| No. | Pos. | Nation | Player |
|---|---|---|---|
| 19 | DF | MEX | André Saucedo |
| 20 | DF | MEX | Armando Amador |
| 21 | MF | MEX | Kevin Sánchez |
| 22 | DF | MEX | Juan Carlos Arana |
| 23 | DF | MEX | Daniel Santillán |
| 24 | DF | MEX | Emmanuel Patiño |
| 25 | GK | MEX | Kevin Bárcenas |
| 26 | FW | COL | Adalberto Viveros |
| 27 | MF | MEX | Leonardo Megchún |
| 28 | MF | MEX | Martín Uribe |
| 29 | FW | MEX | Raúl Nájera |
| 30 | MF | MEX | Erik Rojas |
| 33 | MF | MEX | Alán Castillo |
| 40 | GK | MEX | Alejandro Mateo |
| 45 | MF | MEX | Axel Ramos |
| 49 | FW | MEX | Daniel Ramos |
| 50 | FW | COL | Faiber Perlaza |
