= List of indoor arenas in Mexico =

The following is a list of indoor arenas in Mexico with a capacity of at least 3,000 spectators. Most of the arenas in this list have multiple uses such as individual sports, team sports as well as cultural events and political events. The arenas in the table are ranked by capacity. The arenas with the highest capacities are listed first.

== Current arenas ==
Image	Arena	Capacity	City	Home team(s)	Opened/Renovated
	Mexico City Arena	22,300	Mexico City	Capitanes de la Ciudad de México	2012
	Arena Potosí	22,000	San Luis Potosí		2024
	Arena Guadalajara	20,000	Guadalajara		2025
	Palacio de los Deportes	20,000	Mexico City		1968
	Arena Monterrey	17,600	Monterrey		2003
	Arena México	16,500	Mexico City	Consejo Mundial de Lucha Libre	1956
	Arena VFG	15,000	Tlajomulco de Zúñiga		2009
	Auditorio Amado Nervo	14,000	Tepic		2013
	Auditorio Del Bienestar	14,000	Cancun		2016
	Auditorio Metropolitano	14,000	Estado de Mexico		2017
	Auditorio Benito Juárez	12,000	Zapopan		1970
	Foro GNP Seguros	12,000	Mérida		2014
	Coliseo Centenario	11,500	Torreón		2008
	El Domo	11,000	San Luis Potosí		2010
	Auditorio GNP Seguros	10,500	Puebla		2016
	Centro de Convenciones Ciudad Madero	10,000	Ciudad Madero		1985
	Centro de Usos Múltiples de Hermosillo	10,000	Hermosillo		1985
	Centro de Usos Múltiples de Mazatlán	10,000	Mazatlán		2015
	Gimnasio Manuel Bernardo Aguirre	9,600	Chihuahua	Dorados de Chihuahua	1980
	Centro de Convenciones de Tampico	8,500	Tampico		2009
	Foro Chiapas	8,000	Tuxtla Gutiérrez		2016
	Arena Macuiltépetl	8,000	Xalapa		2025
	Gimnasio Josué Neri Santos	8,000	Ciudad Juárez		1974
	Centro de Usos Múltiples de Ciudad Obregón	8,000	Ciudad Obregón		2009
	Poliforum Zamna	6,640	Mérida		1982/2014
	Gimnasio Santiago González	6,500	Piedras Negras		1982
	Auditorio Bicentenario	6,000	Morelia		2012
	Polideportivo Carlos Martínez	6,000	Pachuca		2001
	Centro de Usos Múltiples de Los Mochis	5,830	Los Mochis	Pioneros de Los Mochis	2014
	Arena Coliseo	5,550	Mexico City	Consejo Mundial de Lucha Libre	1943
	Gimnasio Olímpico Juan de la Barrera	5,242	Mexico City	Diablos Rojos del México, Ángeles de la Ciudad de México, Lucha Libre AAA Worldwide, Mexico City Asuncion	1968/2017
	Polyforum Rodolfo Torre Cantú	5,224	Nuevo Laredo		2013
	Arena Mobil	5,000	Monterrey	Fuerza Regia de Monterrey	2013
	Polifórum Benito Juárez	4,800	Cancún	El Calor de Cancún	2009
	Auditorio PSF	4,779	Mexicali	Soles de Mexicali	1980/2012
	Auditorio Fausto Gutierrez Moreno	4,500	Tijuana		1969
	Gimnasio Nico Varela	4,500	Fresnillo	Gambusinos de Fresnillo	1994
	Domo de la Feria	4,463	León	Abejas de León	1980/2010
	Auditorio Municipal de Torreón	4,363	Torreón	Toros Laguna	1969/2012
	Gimnasio Universitario UACJ	4,347	Ciudad Juárez		1985
	Auditorio Benito Juárez	4,000	Veracruz		1972/2004
	Gimnasio Rodrigo M. Quevedo	4,000	Chihuahua		1982
	Gimnasio Multidisciplinario Nuevo Laredo	4,000	Nuevo Laredo		2007
	Gimnasio Juan Fernández Albarrán	4,000	Toluca		1969/2018
	Gimnasio Miguel Hidalgo	4,000	Puebla	Lobos de Puebla	1974
	Arena Astros	4,000	Guadalajara	Astros de Jalisco	2011
	Auditorio Universidad Michoacana	3,500	Morelia		
	Arena BUAP	3,500	Puebla		1984
	Polifórum Deportivo y Cultural Universitario Morelos	3,500	Aguascalientes		1974/2016
	Arena ITSON	3,500	Ciudad Obregón	Halcones de Ciudad Obregón	2009
	Auditorio del Pueblo	3,500	Durango		1960/2018
	Arena Sonora	3,500	Hermosillo	Rayos de Hermosillo	1969
	Arena Borregos	3,500	Atizapán de Zaragoza		1976
	Gimnasio Marcelino González	3,458	Zacatecas	Mineros de Zacatecas	1986
	Auditorio Miguel Barragán	3,400	San Luis Potosí City	Santos del Potosí	1970
	Insurgentes Ice Rink	3,386	Mexico City		1962
	Arena Zonkeys	3,000	Tijuana	Zonkeys de Tijuana	2019
	Auditorio Hermanos Carreón	3,000	Aguascalientes	Panteras de Aguascalientes	1975
	Mesón de los Deportes UAN	3,000	Tepic		1969
	Fernando Montes de Oca Hall	3,000	Mexico City		1967
	Inforum Irapuato	3,000	Irapuato	Freseros de Irapuato	2000
	Lobodome	3,000	Mazatlán	Venados de Mazatlán	1999

== Proposed ==
City/town	Arena	Opening	Capacity
León	Arena Guanajuato	TBD	20,000
Chihuahua	Arena Chihuahua	TBD	12,500

== Former / demolished ==
City/town	Arena	Date built	Date closed	Capacity	Image
Mexico City	Revolution Ice Rink	1960	1997	8,500	

== See also ==
- List of indoor arenas
- List of stadiums in Mexico
- List of football stadiums in Mexico
- Lists of stadiums
