= Christopher Roberto Ortega =

Mexican footballer (born 1986)

Personal information
- Full name: Christopher Roberto Ortega Fernández
- Date of birth: 4 March 1986 (age 40)
- Place of birth: Mexico City, Mexico
- Position: Midfielder

Youth career
- 2007–2008: Socio Águila

Senior career*
Years	Team	Apps	(Gls)
2007	América	1	(0)
- * Club domestic league appearances and goals as of 27 December 2008 ‡ National team caps and goals as of 27 December 2008

Christopher Roberto Ortega Fernández (born 4 March 1986) is a Mexican former footballer who played as a midfielder.

== Club career ==
Ortega made his Primera División de México debut in the last round of the Apertura 2007 tournament, entering as a second-half substitute in the match against Monterrey on 10 November 2007.

== See also ==
- Football in Mexico
- List of football clubs in Mexico
