= Estadio BBVA =

Association football stadium in Guadalupe, Mexico

- El Gigante de Acero "The Steel Giant"

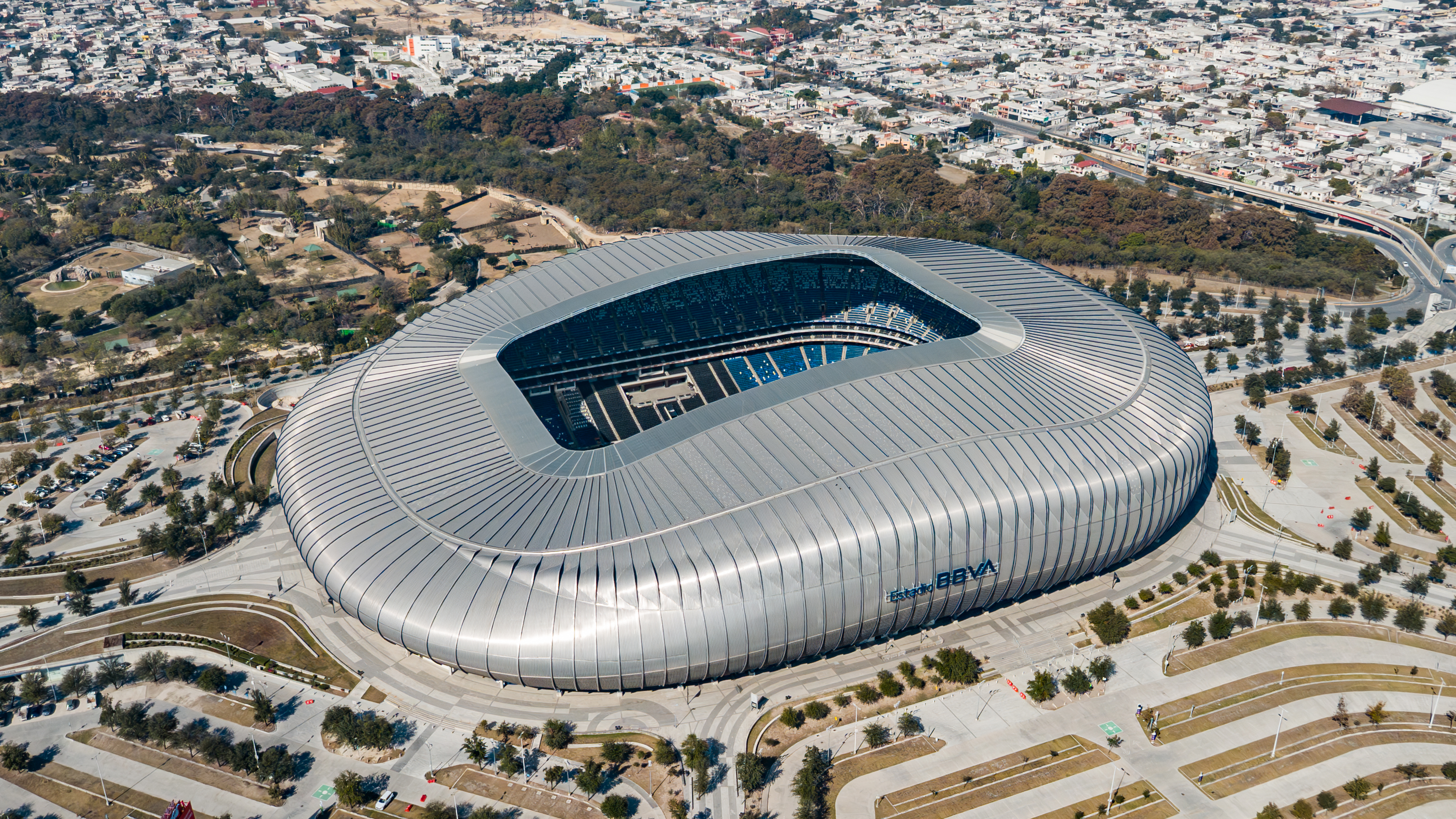
- Aerial view from southeast in 2026
- Interactive map of Estadio BBVA
- Former names: Estadio BBVA Bancomer (2015–2019); Estadio Monterrey (2026 FIFA World Cup)
- Location: Guadalupe, Nuevo León, Mexico
- Coordinates: 25°40′9″N 100°14′40″W
- Elevation: 530 m (1,740 ft) AMSL
- Owner: FEMSA
- Operator: FEMSA
- Capacity: 53,529; 51,243 (2026 FIFA World Cup)
- Surface: GrassMaster
- Public transit: Metrorrey at Exposición

Construction
- Built: 2011–2015
- Opened: 2 August 2015; 11 years ago
- Cost: US$200 million
- Architect: Populous / VFO / Federico Velasco
- Main contractors: Aceros Lozano, GGP, Maíz Mier

Tenant
- C.F. Monterrey (2015–present)

Website
- estadio-bbva.mx

Estadio BBVA (formerly known as Estadio BBVA Bancomer) is an association football stadium located in Guadalupe, a suburb east of Monterrey, Nuevo León, Mexico. Dubbed "El Gigante de Acero" (lit. 'The steel giant'), it replaced the Estadio Tecnológico as the home of C.F. Monterrey, ending the club's 63-year tenure at that venue. Its name is branded after the Spanish bank BBVA, and specifically its Mexican branch BBVA Mexico.

Opened eleven years ago in 2015, the stadium was inaugurated on 2 August with the eighth edition of the Eusébio Cup, where Monterrey defeated Benfica 3–0. During the 2026 FIFA World Cup, it hosted four matches and was temporarily known as Estadio Monterrey during the tournament.

== Design ==
Developed by C.F. Monterrey owner FEMSA, it was designed by multinational architecture firm Populous, along with the Mexican firm VFO. Federico Velasco along with Populous, were the lead designers for the project. Construction began in August 2011 and was completed in July 2015.

The venue opened in 2015 with a capacity of 51,000, making it the fourth largest in Mexico. Built at a cost of US$200 million, it was the most expensive stadium in Mexico at the time of its construction. The owners soon added more seats, expanding the capacity to 53,500 in 2016. It has a grass surface, suites, a club-themed restaurant, a club lounge, and high-end interior and exterior design. The inclination of the grandstand is 34 degrees, and the distance between the field and seats is the minimum allowed by FIFA, providing closeness to the action.

Estadio BBVA received a silver certification from the Leadership in Energy and Environmental Design for its sustainable design. It was the first football stadium in North America to earn the certification.

Dimensions
Length	277 m (909 ft)
Width	232 m (761 ft)
Height - north side	46 m (151 ft)
Height - south side	32 m (105 ft)
Circumference	800 m (2,625 ft)

== Permeable area ==
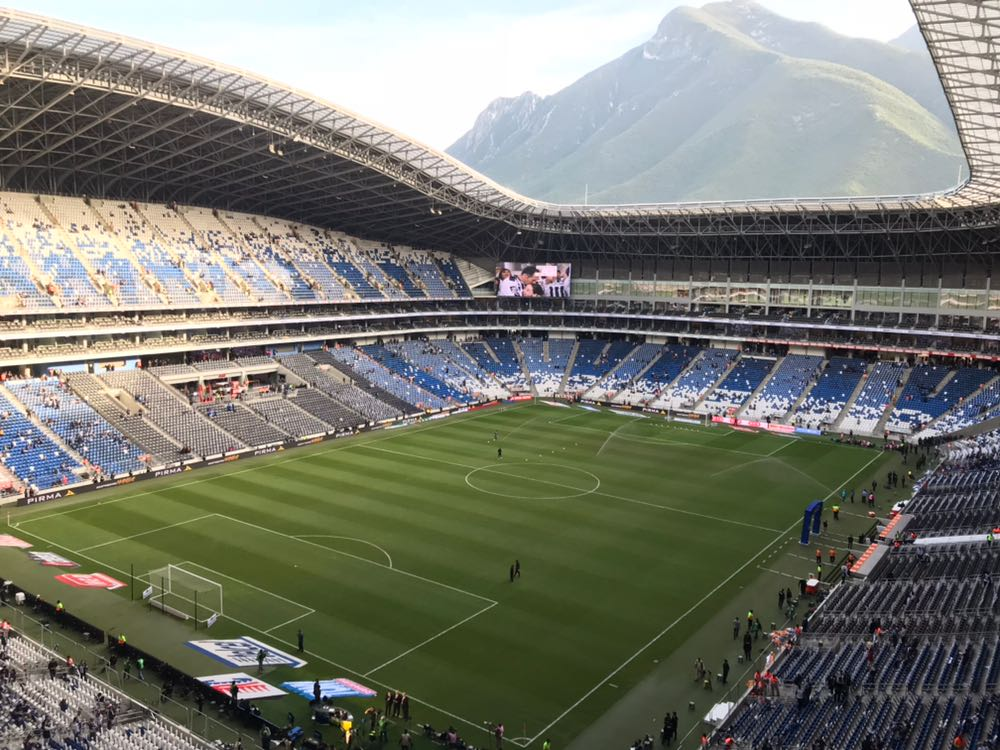
View of Cerro de la Silla from the northwest corner

More than a third of the total land area are green areas. This proportion exceeds the current regulations. These green areas are used to filter rainwater, which will contribute to the recharge of aquifers. Parking lots are evenly distributed around the stadium, including wooded areas to achieve integration with the Ecological Park. These areas are divided into zones, which are integrated into the landscape and topography. The northern boundary to the Rio La Silla is a wooded trail area that connects the stadium with the New Ecological Park. This ecological park and parking are also green areas, with a landscape design that blends with the surrounding environment, with only trees and plants of the region to facilitate preservation and adaptation to the environment.

=== Scenery ===
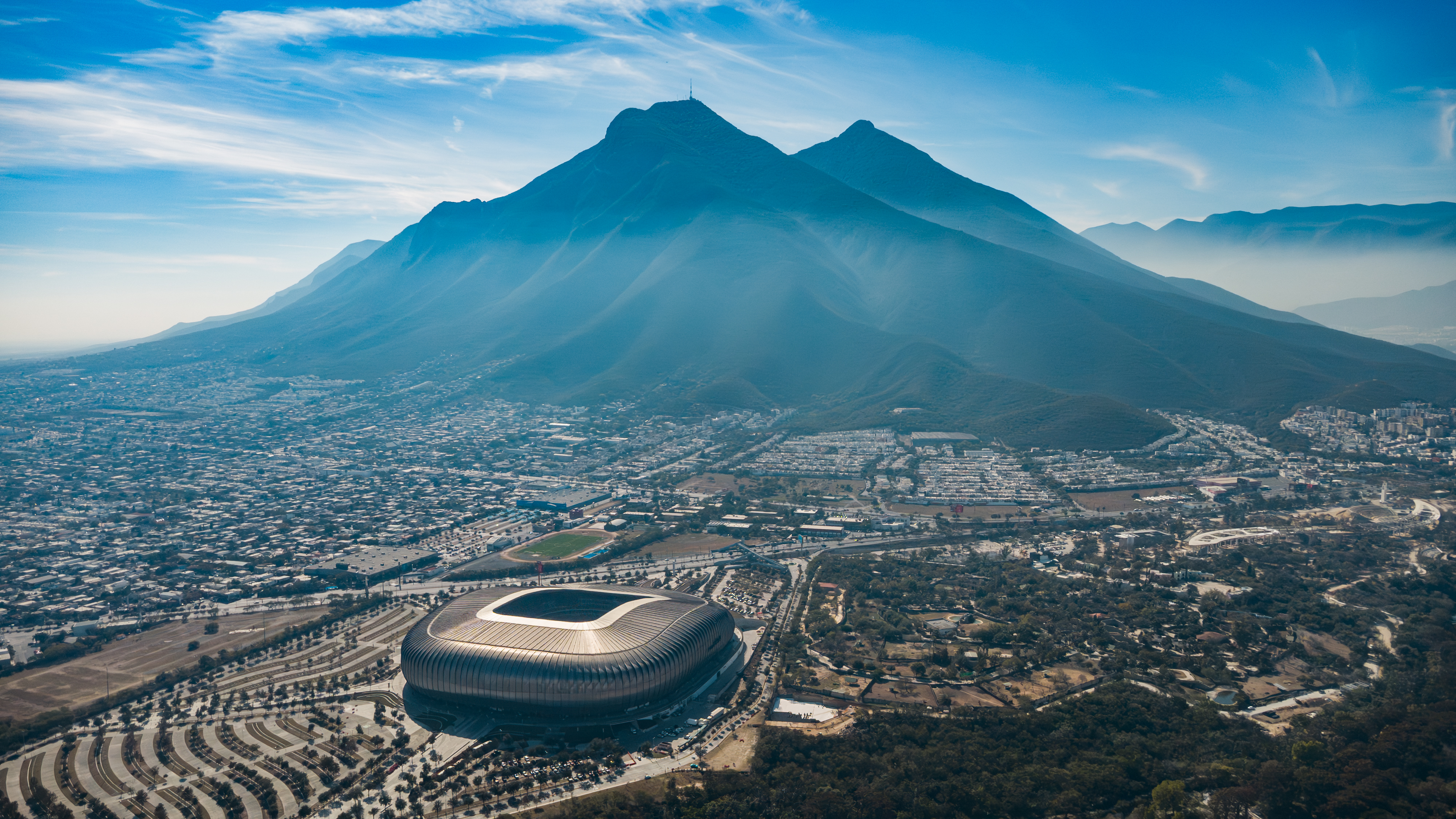
The stadium is situated nearby the Cerro de la Silla

The stadium is notable for its view to the south-southeast of Cerro de la Silla, a prominent peak with a summit elevation of 1,820 m (5,970 ft) above sea level. The mountain can be seen from the northwestern section of the stadium, providing scenic views for fans.

== Association Football events ==
=== 2022 CONCACAF W Championship ===
The 2022 CONCACAF W Championship held in Mexico, the stadium hosted 8 matches:

Date	Time	Team #1	Res.	Team #2	Round	Attendance
5 July 2022	18:00	Costa Rica	3–0	Panama	Group B	4,327
5 July 2022	21:00	Canada	6–0	Trinidad and Tobago	Group B	3,872
7 July 2022	18:00	United States	5–0	Jamaica	Group A	3,150
7 July 2022	21:00	Mexico	0–3	Haiti	Group A	3,375
11 July 2022	18:00	Canada	2–0	Costa Rica	Group B	3,721
11 July 2022	21:00	Jamaica	4–0	Haiti	Group A	4,356
18 July 2022	18:00	Costa Rica	0–1	Jamaica	Third place match	6,889
18 July 2022	21:00	United States	1–0	Canada	Final	17,247

=== 2026 FIFA World Cup ===
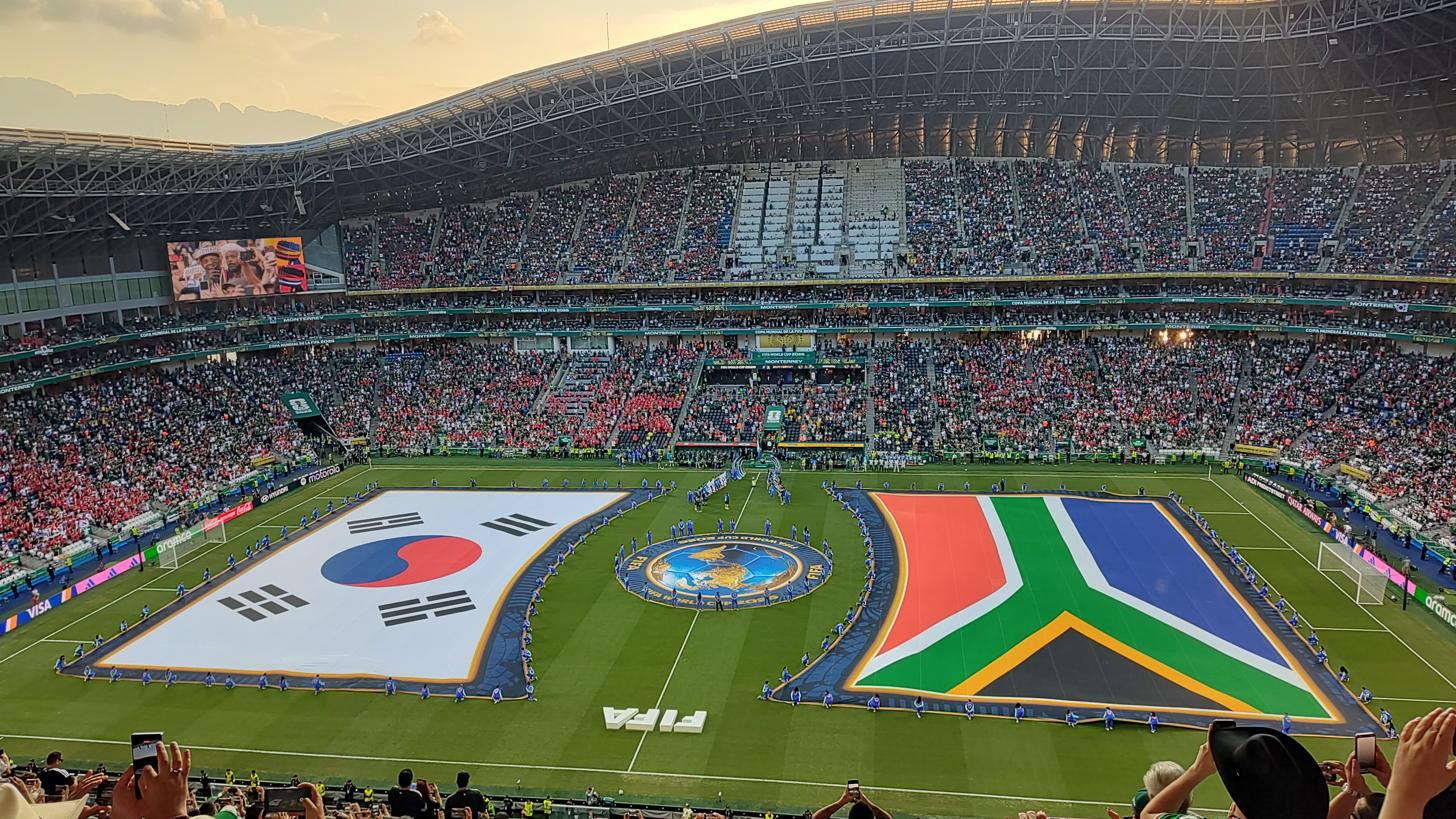
Inside Estadio BBVA prior to a match between South Korea and South Africa at the 2026 FIFA World Cup.

Estadio BBVA was one of three Mexican venues to host multiple matches during the 2026 FIFA World Cup. The stadium hosted four matches: three group stage matches and one Round of 32 match. It was the only one of the three venues in Mexico to not host any of their group games, with Mexico instead playing in the Estadio Azteca and Estadio Akron.

==== 2026 FIFA World Cup inter-confederation play-offs ====
Date	Team #1	Res.	Team #2	Attendance
26 March 2026	Bolivia	2–1	Suriname	33,547
31 March 2026	Iraq	2–1	Bolivia	49,286

==== List of 2026 FIFA World Cup matches ====
Date	Time	Team #1	Res.	Team #2	Round	Attendance
14 June 2026	20:00	Sweden	5–1	Tunisia	Group F	50,987
20 June 2026	22:00	Tunisia	0–4	Japan	Group F	51,243
24 June 2026	19:00	South Africa	1–0	South Korea	Group A	51,243
29 June 2026	19:00	Netherlands	1–1 (a.e.t.); 2–3 (pen.)	Morocco	Round of 32	51,243

== Concerts ==
Date	Artist	Opening Act(s)	Tour / Concert name	Attendance	Revenue
15 February 2017	Justin Bieber	—N/a	Purpose World Tour	45,535 / 45,535	$3,491,598
25 March 2022	Coldplay	Carla Morrison; Danny Lux	Music of the Spheres World Tour	112,262 / 112,262	$8,996,432
26 March 2022	Coldplay	Carla Morrison; Danny Lux	Music of the Spheres World Tour	112,262 / 112,262	$8,996,432
3 December 2022	Bad Bunny	Mr. Pig	World's Hottest Tour	90,084 / 90,084	$17,456,717
4 December 2022	Bad Bunny	Mr. Pig	World's Hottest Tour	90,084 / 90,084	$17,456,717
26 September 2023	The Weeknd	Kaytranada; Mike Dean	After Hours til Dawn Tour	46,791 / 46,791	$5,689,051
8 November 2024	Paul McCartney	—N/a	Got Back		
12 March 2025	Shakira		Las Mujeres Ya No Lloran World Tour	88,201 / 88,201	$12,466,444
13 March 2025	Shakira		Las Mujeres Ya No Lloran World Tour	88,201 / 88,201	$12,466,444
6 November 2026	Karol G		Viajando Por El Mundo Tropitour		
7 November 2026	Karol G		Viajando Por El Mundo Tropitour		
8 November 2026	Karol G		Viajando Por El Mundo Tropitour		

== See also ==
- Estadio Universitario (UANL)
- List of football stadiums in Mexico
- List of stadiums in Mexico
- Lists of stadiums
