= Héroes de Zaci =

Mexican football club

- Full name: Héroes de Zaci Fútbol Club
- Nickname: Los Héroes (The Heroes)
- Founded: April 2015; 11 years ago
- Ground: Unidad Deportiva Benito Juárez; Nuevo Laredo, Tamaulipas
- Capacity: 5,000
- Owner: Isaac Arias
- Chairman: Isaac Arias
- Manager: Enrique Garza
- League: Liga Premier (Premier A)
- 2025–26: Liga Premier (Serie A); Regular phase: 9th (Group III); Final phase: Did not qualify
| Home colours | Away colours |

Héroes de Zaci Fútbol Club, is a Mexican football club based in Nuevo Laredo, Tamaulipas that competes in the Premier A, the intermediate branch of the Liga Premier de México, the third division level of Mexican football.

== History ==
The team was founded in 2015, and until 2017 the club was originally based in Valladolid, Yucatán, the name of the team is based on the old name of its original city and its heroic character. In the 2017-18 season, the team was asked not to play during that season due to problems with the local stadium.

In the 2018–19 season, the team was relocated to Mexico City and returned to participate in the Tercera División de México. In the promotion phase, the team won one of the two places to play the final series, which allowed Héroes de Zaci to be promoted to the Segunda División de México. On June 15, 2019, Héroes de Zaci won its first championship after defeating Atlético San Francisco with a score of 3–2 on aggregate.

Héroes de Zaci was associated with Yalmakán, a team that participated in the Liga Premier – Serie A between 2018 and 2024.

On July 29, 2020, Héroes de Zaci joined the Serie A after being approved after a one year hold because the stadium requirements were not yet met. However, to meet the requirements, the team was relocated again to Acámbaro, Guanajuato, in addition, the franchise was rented to another administration other than the owners. However, the team was subsequently not approved to participate in the season and again it was put on hiatus to try to participate again from the 2021–22 season.

In the 2021–22 season the team returned, but it was enrolled at the Liga TDP. On May 25, 2025, the team again won promotion to the Segunda División de México.

On June 6, 2025, Héroes de Zaci won their second Liga TDP national title after defeating Guerreros de Autlán in the champions trophy match.

On June 27, 2025, the team was officially accepted into the Serie A, however, in order to play in that league the club had to change its field, being relocated once more to the Estadio Municipal Claudio Suárez, located in Texcoco, State of Mexico. During the 2025–2026 season, the team became embroiled in a betting-related match-fixing scandal; although the players refused to participate in the scheme, they faced threats linked to it, forcing the team to play at a neutral venue for protection and leading to the players' dismissal for their own safety.

In August 2026, the team announced its intentions to settle Reynosa, Tamaulipas. However, the team had to settle into Nuevo Laredo, after Héroes de Zaci was unable to use a suitable sports facility in Reynosa.

== Players ==
=== First-team squad ===
As of 6 September 2026

Note: Flags indicate national team as defined under FIFA eligibility rules; some limited exceptions apply. Players may hold more than one non-FIFA nationality.

| No. | Pos. | Nation | Player |
|---|---|---|---|
| 1 | GK | MEX | Mauricio Peniche |
| 3 | DF | MEX | Marlon Villa |
| 5 | DF | MEX | Ronaldo Martínez |
| 6 | FW | MEX | Johan Lara |
| 7 | FW | MEX | Iván Flores |
| 8 | MF | MEX | Emiliano Fernández |
| 9 | FW | USA | Reymundo López |
| 10 | MF | MEX | Roberto Salazar |
| 11 | FW | MEX | César Bustos |
| 12 | DF | MEX | Roberto Pifferi |
| 14 | MF | MEX | Efraín Moreno |
| 15 | MF | MEX | Ángel Maqueda |
| 16 | DF | MEX | Roberto Rivera |

| No. | Pos. | Nation | Player |
|---|---|---|---|
| 18 | DF | MEX | Carlos Hernández |
| 19 | FW | MEX | Edgar Quintero |
| 20 | MF | MEX | Daniel Ponce |
| 21 | MF | MEX | Antonio Álvarez |
| 22 | MF | MEX | Edwin Guerrero |
| 23 | DF | MEX | Antonio Pérez |
| 24 | MF | MEX | Omar Pérez |
| 25 | FW | MEX | Jesús Pérez |
| 26 | MF | MEX | Elioth Mata |
| 27 | MF | MEX | Luis Enrique Sánchez |
| 29 | DF | MEX | Edwin Villegas |
| 30 | GK | MEX | Manuel Plaza |

== Reserves ==
=== Héroes de Zaci B ===
Reserve team that plays in the Liga Premier (Premier B), the third level of Mexican football.

=== Héroes de Zaci CDMX ===
Reserve team that plays in the Liga TDP, the fourth level of Mexican football.

=== Héroes de Zaci Hidalgo ===
Reserve team that plays in the Liga TDP.

== Honors ==
- Liga TDP (2): 2018–2019, 2024–2025

== See also ==
- Football in Mexico
- Liga TDP
