= Héctor Mancilla =

Chilean former footballer (born 1980)

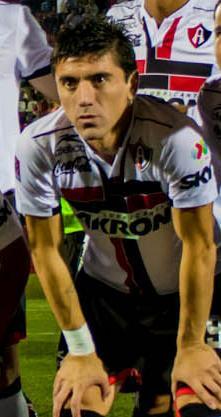
- Mancilla with Atlas in 2012

Personal information
- Full name: Héctor Raúl Mancilla Garcés
- Date of birth: 12 November 1980 (age 46)
- Place of birth: Purranque, Chile
- Height: 1.79 m (5 ft 10 1/2 in)
- Position: Striker

Team information
- Current team: Real Refineros (manager)

Senior career*
| Years | Team | Apps | (Gls) |
| 1999 | Malleco Unido | | |
| 2000–2005 | Huachipato | 144 | (64) |
| 2006 | Colo-Colo | 15 | (12) |
| 2006–2007 | Veracruz | 39 | (15) |
| 2008 | Coatzacoalcos | 16 | (8) |
| 2008–2010 | Toluca | 96 | (55) |
| 2011–2012 | Tigres | 53 | (24) |
| 2012 | Atlas | 17 | (6) |
| 2013–2016 | Morelia | 49 | (23) |
| 2014 | → Cúcuta Deportivo (loan) | 12 | (2) |
| 2015 | → Huachipato (loan) | 12 | (6) |
| 2015 | → Sinaloa (loan) | 13 | (2) |
| 2016 | → Tigres (loan) | 7 | (0) |
| 2017 | Lobos BUAP | 6 | (1) |
| 2018 | Malleco Unido | 4 | (0) |
| Total | | 483 | (219) |

International career
| 2004–2011 | Chile | 10 | (0) |

Managerial career
- 2022: Escorpiones
- 2023: Real Apodaca
- 2024: Morelia (assistant)
- 2025–2026: Chilpancingo
- 2026–: Real Refineros
- * Club domestic league appearances and goals

Héctor Raúl Mancilla Garcés (12 November 1980) is a Chilean former professional footballer and current manager of Liga Premier de México club Real Refineros. He also holds Mexican citizenship.

During his playing career, Mancilla played as a striker, spending the bulk of his career in Mexico, and is a former Chilean international, playing 10 matches for the national side. Mancilla is Huachipato's all-time record goal scorer, with 72 goals.

== Club career ==
Born in Purranque, Mancilla played amateur football for Club Deportivo Santiago Morning de Purranque in his birthtown, and in 1999, aged 18, he left his home city, moving to Malleco, joining Malleco Unido in the Chilean Tercera División.

In his debut season for Malleco in 1999, Mancilla played against Huachipato's reserve team, who also competed in the third tier, and would be scouted by them, joining Huachipato's reserve side that same year. Mancilla would be promoted to Huachipato's main squad the following season.

Mancilla barely played during his debut season for Huachipato in the top flight, only making 3 appearances without scoring, in a very poor season for Huachipato, with the club avoiding relegation to the second tier by one point, by virtue of a draw in the last game of the season.

He would feature more frequently in 2001, under new manager Oscar Garré, making 10 appearances, netting the first professional goal of his career by opening the scoring for Huachipato in a 4–2 away defeat against eventual champions Santiago Wanderers, and scoring for the second and last time that season, netting the equalizing goal in a 2–2 home draw against Coquimbo Unido. Huachipato would finish the season in seventh place, qualifying for the 2001 Liguilla Pre-Copa Libertadores, where Mancilla would play in both legs of the post season qualifiers for the 2001 Copa Libertadores, going scoreless as Huachipato lost 2–6 in aggregate to Cobreloa.

In 2002, which changed the tournament format to include playoffs in order to determine the league champions, Mancilla played 3 times in the 2002 Apertura, with Huachipato qualifying for the playoffs, exiting in a quarterfinal second leg golden goal loss to eventual champions Universidad Catolica. Huachipato would play the post season qualifiers for the 2002 Copa Sudamericana, the Liguilla Pre-Copa Sudamericana, where Mancilla scored his first goal of the year in a single leg 2–3 loss to championship runners-up Rangers.

Mancilla would become a starter for Huachipato in the 2002 Clausura, playing 14 games, but would not manage to score again during the year, in a season that ended with a playoff quarterfinal away goals exit (3–3) to Universidad de Chile.

Mancilla cemented his starting place in the 2003 Apertura, playing 21 times, joint top in appearances for Huachipato in that tournament (with Cristián Oviedo), and netting 5 times in regular season as Huachipato reached the playoffs for the third season running. Mancilla would score in the second leg of a 2–3 first round golden goal defeat to Universidad Católica, but his goal would maintain Huachipato in the tournament as they progressed to the quarterfinals as best losers (alongside Colo-Colo). In the quarterfinals, Huachipato would defeat Puerto Montt, advancing to the semifinals for the first time in the club's history, facing Cobreloa. Mancilla would score in Huachipato's first leg 2–1 home victory, but they would lose 0–2 away to eventual champions Cobreloa in a 2–3 golden goal aggregate loss. Huachipato would play the 2003 Liguilla Pre-Copa Sudamericana, the qualifiers for the 2003 Copa Sudamericana, scoring his only goal in the post season tournament in Huachipato's first round single leg 2–0 away win to Lota Schwager, as Huachipato would be knocked out in the semifinals by eventual qualifiers Osorno.

In the 2003 Clausura, Mancilla remained in the starting eleven, playing 16 matches and scoring 11 goals, in Huachipato's fourth consecutive playoff season, going scoreless in both of legs of a 3–5 quarterfinal exit to Unión Española.

Under new manager Arturo Salah, Mancilla would have his breakout season in the 2004 Apertura, playing 23 times and scoring 16 goals, his best at the club, as Huachipato made the playoffs for the fifth season in a row. In the first round, Mancilla would go scoreless in a 6–2 aggregate win over Coquimbo Unido, and would score the equalizer in a 1–1 home draw against Colo-Colo, as Huachipato would win 1–0 away (2–1 aggregate) to reach the semifinals, once again facing reigning champions Cobreloa. Mancilla would score in the first leg of the semifinal, a 2–2 home draw in Concepción that was abandoned due to fog at half time, and resumed the next day without any further goals, and would score again in the 2–3 golden goal away loss in Calama that eliminated Huachipato. In the 2004 Liguilla Pre-Copa Sudamericana, Mancilla would play both legs of a 2–4 aggregate first round loss to Universidad de Concepción. This would be the last Liguilla game of Mancilla's career.

In the 2004 Clausura, due to injuries, Mancilla's performances would dip, starting 11 games and scoring 6 times, as Huachipato failed to reach the playoffs for the first time.

2005 would prove to be the final year of Mancilla's first stint at Huachipato. In the 2005 Apertura, Mancilla would become the league's top scorer with 13 goals (joint top with Álvaro Sarabia and Joel Estay), becoming the first, and to date, only Huachipato player to ever be the top scorer of a Primera División season. Mancilla would lead Huachipato to the playoffs once again, scoring twice in the 4–0 first leg home win against Colo-Colo, and scoring the only goal in a 1–0 away win at Estadio Monumental, in a 5–0 aggregate win that took Huachipato to the semifinals, facing Coquimbo Unido. He would go scoreless in both legs of the 2–3 aggregate loss that took Coquimbo to their first final, in a second leg marred by refereeing mistakes.

The 2005 Clausura was Mancilla's last season with Huachipato during his first stint at the club, in which Mancilla would maintain his good form, starting 21 matches and scoring 9 times, helping Huachipato reach the playoffs, scoring in both less of their 2–3 aggregate quarterfinal exit to Cobresal.

Mancilla scored 66 goals in 150 appearances during his first stint at Huachipato, becoming the club's record goal top scorer in all competitions.

In 2006, Mancilla was sold to Colo-Colo, scoring twelve goals in his first and only season with the club, where he won the first trophy of his career as Colo-Colo won the 2006 Apertura.

In 2007, Mancilla moved abroad for the first time in his career, as he was sold to CD Veracruz of Mexico for $800,000, where he would remain for two seasons, scoring 15 goals in 39 appearances. On 16 June 2008, Mancilla was transferred for an undisclosed price to Toluca where he would remain for four seasons, winning the 2008 Apertura, as the top goal scorer in the league, and the 2010 Bicentenario. In 2011, he moved to Tigres, being instrumental in winning the 2011 Apertura, scoring in the second leg of the final. In 2012, he was sold to Atlas, and in the following season, Mancilla would join Morelia, where he'd win the last silverware of his career, the 2013 Apertura Copa MX, scoring in the final and in the subsequent penalty shootout which gave Morelia the title.

While still contracted to Morelia, Mancilla was sent in a series of loans lasting the remainder of his contract, first to Cúcuta of Colombia in 2014, returning to South America after 8 years in Mexico, where he'd stay for a single season.

He would move clubs again in 2015, returning to Chile after 9 years, playing one season for Huachipato, scoring 6 times, netting his last goal for Huachipato in a 1–0 home win against Arica that qualified Huachipato to the 2015 Copa Sudamericana, ending the season in third place.

During the same year, he would return to Mexico, on loan to Sinaloa, and Mancilla was subsequently loaned to Tigres in 2016, where he'd make 7 scoreless appearances.

After his contract with Morelia expired in 2016, Mancilla played in 2017 for Lobos BUAP, scoring once in his final stint in Mexican football. Mancilla finished his career by returning to his boyhood club Malleco Unido in the Segunda División Profesional de Chile in 2018, to honour his mother's wishes, retiring from football at the age of 38.

== International career ==
Mancilla was first called up to the Chile national football team in 2004, being named into Chile's Copa America 2004 squad, where he made his international debut in the same competition as a substitute during a 1–0 group stage loss to Brazil, he would play the remainder of Chile's group stage matches, as a half time substitute in a 1–1 with Paraguay and as a starter in the 1–2 defeat to Costa Rica which eliminated Chile from the competition. Mancilla would not be called up again until 2009, where he would feature as a substitute in a 2–0 away win against Paraguay on 6 June 2009 and a 4–0 home win against Bolivia on 10 June 2009 for the 2010 World Cup Qualifiers. Mancila would make 5 friendly match appearances during 2009 and 2010, but would not be considered for Chile's 2010 FIFA World Cup squad, leading to his international retirement in 2010. He would end up finishing his international career in 2011, starting in a 2–0 friendly win against Colombia.

== Style of play ==
Nickanamed Mancigol, Mancilla was a prolific striker, described in his prime as a true threat in the box due to his finishing and ability in short spaces, in spite of being considered a physically unimposing striker. During his career, Mancilla was a regular top scorer both in Chile and in Mexico, but was rarely considered for his national side.

== Managerial career ==
Mancilla started his career as manager of Escorpiones and Real Apodaca in the Liga Premier de México. On 8 October 2024, Mancilla joined the technical staff of Mario García in Morelia as an assistant coach.

In August 2025 he was named head coach of Liga Premier de México team Avispones de Chilpancingo.

After coaching Avispones de Chilpancingo, Mancilla assumed as manager of Real Refineros on 31 July 2026.

== Honours ==
=== Player ===
Colo-Colo

- Primera División de Chile: Apertura 2006

Toluca

- Mexican Primera División: Apertura 2008, Bicentenario 2010

Tigres

- Mexican Primera División: Apertura 2011

Morelia

- Copa MX: Apertura 2013

Individual

- Primera División de México Golden Boot: Apertura 2008, Clausura 2009
- Primera División de México Best Forward: Apertura 2008, Clausura 2009
- Tecate Premios Deportes Best Forward: 2009
- Tecate Premios Deportes Best XI: 2009
