= Estadio Ciudad UdeG =

Planned stadium in Guadalajara, Mexico

- Interactive map of Estadio Ciudad UdeG
- Location: Guadalajara, Jalisco, Mexico
- Coordinates: 20.733715°N 103.375404°W
- Owner: University of Guadalajara; Grupo PRODI
- Capacity: 40,000
- Surface: Grass

Tenants
- Atlas; Leones Negros UdeG

Estadio Ciudad UdeG is a proposed stadium project in Guadalajara, Jalisco, Mexico, intended to serve as the new home of Mexican clubs Atlas and Leones Negros UdeG. The stadium is scheduled to open in 2030, with both teams set to leave Estadio Jalisco upon its completion. It is expected to have a capacity of approximately 40,000 people, although it can be adapted to suit the various events it will host—with football being the primary one. The design was commissioned from Populous Holdings. The approximate investment for it will be US$275 million.

== History ==
In April 2026, Grupo PRODI, a sports enterprise linked to the Portuguese construction company Mota-Engil, completed the acquisition of the Liga MX team Atlas F.C. Among the new owners' proposals was the construction of a new stadium for the team, necessitated by the impossibility of renovating the Estadio Jalisco; this was due to the stadium's ownership structure, which requires the consent of all the teams involved to authorize any major modifications.

Following the announcement, two sites in the Guadalajara area were proposed: the first on land adjacent to the University Center of Exact Sciences and Engineering, part of the University of Guadalajara (UdeG), the state's largest public university; and the second on a esplanade known as Calle 2, used for hosting concerts, fairs, and other large-scale events, which is located in Belenes, a neighborhood of the metropolitan municipality of Zapopan, on another property owned by the university; consequently, UdeG's involvement became essential for greenlighting the construction. Ultimately, the second option was chosen as the site for the new stadium.

Finally, on 7 October 2026, the construction of the new stadium was confirmed as part of an urban development project known as Ciudad UdeG. This project includes the creation of cultural, educational, and entertainment facilities as well as green spaces, and aims to connect the stadium and nearby venues, such as the Telmex Auditorium; the Estadio Panamericano de Béisbol; the Conjunto Santander de Artes Escénicas; the Centro Cultural Universitario and the Public Library of the State of Jalisco, located in the same area proposed for the stadium.

The complex will be financed entirely with private capital, while the university will provide the land and receive rent for its use for 99 years; once that period ends, the facility will become the property of the UdeG.
