= Vaqueros Reynosa F.C. =

Mexican football club

Vaqueros Reynosa
- Full name: Vaqueros Reynosa Fútbol Club
- Nickname: Los Vaqueros (The Cowboys)
- Founded: 2006; 20 years ago 21 July 2026; 56 days ago (refounded)
- Ground: Unidad Deportiva Solidaridad; Reynosa, Tamaulipas
- Capacity: 15,000
- Owner: Guillermo Lara
- Chairman: Noé Becerra
- Manager: Marco Angúlo
- League: Liga Premier (Premier A)
- 2026–27: Pre–season
Home colours	Away colours

Vaqueros Reynosa Fútbol Club is a Mexican professional football club based in Reynosa, Tamaulipas that competes in the Premier A, the intermediate branch of the Liga Premier de México, the third division level of Mexican football.

== History ==
The team was originally founded in 2006, when Vaqueros de Apodaca was relocated from Apodaca, Nuevo León to Reynosa, Tamaulipas due to the city's sports infrastructure and adopted the name Vaqueros de Reynosa. The team had very poor sporting results at the Clausura 2007 season, resulting in its relegation to the Tercera División de México, where it folded in 2008.

The team was refounded in July 2026, an initiative by local businesspeople seeking to ensure the presence of a professional team in Reynosa following the demise of several projects that had attempted to establish themselves in the city.

== Players ==
=== First-team squad ===
As of 7 September 2026

Note: Flags indicate national team as defined under FIFA eligibility rules; some limited exceptions apply. Players may hold more than one non-FIFA nationality.

No.	Pos.	Nation	Player
2	DF	MEX	Christian Conde
3	DF	MEX	Cristian Rodríguez
4	DF	MEX	Jordy Pizano
5	DF	MEX	Diego Escamilla
6	MF	MEX	Diego Araujo
7	DF	MEX	Daniel Barajas
8	FW	MEX	Isaac Medina
9	DF	MEX	Oliver Cabrera
10	FW	MEX	Joel Gómez
11	FW	MEX	Daniel Valencia
12	GK	MEX	Ronaldo Gutiérrez
13	DF	MEX	Javier Ramírez
14	FW	MEX	Emilio Hernández
15	FW	MEX	Martín Jaime
16	DF	MEX	Sergio Cienfuegos

No.	Pos.	Nation	Player
19	FW	MEX	Gael Palmerín
20	MF	MEX	David Peña
21	FW	MEX	Carlos Navarro
22	MF	MEX	Abel Trejo
23	FW	MEX	Isaac Robles
24	MF	MEX	Jordan Luna
25	DF	MEX	Abdiel Huiqui
26	DF	MEX	Héctor Vázquez
27	FW	MEX	Franco Hernández
28	FW	MEX	Farid Hernández
29	GK	MEX	Adalberto Mancilla
30	MF	USA	Joseph Simental
33	FW	MEX	José Ramos
49	GK	MEX	Alan Macías
