= Estadio Municipal Claudio Suárez =

- Interactive map of Estadio Municipal Claudio Suárez
- Full name: Estadio Municipal Claudio Suárez
- Former names: Estadio Municipal de Texcoco (1949–2003)
- Location: Texcoco, State of Mexico, Mexico
- Coordinates: 19°30′46.5″N 98°53′31.5″W
- Owner: Texcoco City Council
- Operator: Texcoco City Council
- Capacity: 4,000
- Surface: Natural grass

Construction
- Opened: 1949
- Renovated: 2014

Tenants
- Deportivo Texcoco (1959–1964, 1965–1970, 1982–1985, 1986–1988); Chapingo Texcoco (1964–1965); Deportivo Neza (1978–1981); Osos Grises (1981–1982); Atlético Veracruz (2015–2016); Faraones de Texcoco (2017–2025); Neza (2023, 2025–2026); Héroes de Zaci (2025–2026); Halcones Negros (2025–present)

The Estadio Municipal Claudio Suárez is a multi-use stadium located in Texcoco, State of Mexico, Mexico. It is currently used mostly for football matches and is the home stadium for Halcones Negros. The stadium has a capacity of 4,000 people.

The stadium was inaugurated in 1949, however, it was not until ten years later that it began to be used regularly for football matches.

The stadium's most important period was from 1978 to 1981, when it became the home of Deportivo Neza, a team participating in Mexico's First Division. This team was established in Texcoco due to the lack of a suitable stadium in Ciudad Nezahualcóyotl. In 1981, the Municipal Stadium hosted three playoff matches. At the end of the season the new stadium in Nezahualcóyotl was inaugurated, thus ending the period of greatest national importance for the Texcoco stadium.

In November 2003, the stadium was renamed Estadio Municipal Claudio Suárez as a tribute to the footballer who holds the second place in number of international caps with the Mexico national football team.
