= Marco Angúlo =

Mexican footballer (born 1991)

Marco Angulo
Personal information
- Full name: Marco Antonio Angulo Álvarez
- Date of birth: 22 May 1991 (age 35)
- Place of birth: Ahome, Sinaloa, Mexico
- Height: 1.77 m (5 ft 10 in)
- Position: Forward

Team information
- Current team: Vaqueros Reynosa (manager)

Youth career
- 2007–2009: Necaxa
- 2009–2010: Inter Tehuacán
- 2010–2012: Cruz Azul

Senior career*
Years	Team	Apps	(Gls)
2012–2015	Cruz Azul	4	(0)
2012–2013	→ Cruz Azul Hidalgo (loan)	17	(0)
2013–2014	→ Cruz Azul Jasso (loan)	26	(0)
2014–2015	→ Cruz Azul Hidalgo (loan)	19	(1)
2015	Atlético Estado de México	11	(1)
2016	Irapuato	13	(2)
2016–2017	Santos de Soledad	28	(4)

Managerial career
- 2020–2022: Titanes de Querétaro
- 2022: Michoacán F.C.
- 2023–2025: Peribán
- 2025: Racing de Veracruz
- 2026: Halcones (assistant)
- 2026–: Vaqueros Reynosa
- * Club domestic league appearances and goals as of 12 September 2022

Marco Antonio Angulo Álvarez (born May 22, 1991) is a Mexican former professional footballer who last played for Santos de Soledad, who currently manages Vaqueros Reynosa.
