= Real Refineros F.C. CDS =

Mexican football club

Real Refineros CDS
- Full name: Real Refineros Fútbol Club CDS
- Nickname: Los Refineros (The Refinery workers)
- Founded: 27 July 2026; 2 months ago
- Ground: Estadio Sección XXIV; Salamanca, Guanajuato
- Capacity: 10,000
- Chairman: Julio López
- Manager: Héctor Mancilla
- League: Liga Premier (Premier A)
- 2026–27: Pre–season
Home colours	Away colours

Real Refineros Fútbol Club CDS is a Mexican football club that plays in the Premier A, the intermediate branch of the Liga Premier de México, the third tier of Mexican football. The club is based in Salamanca, Guanajuato.

== History ==
Football in Salamanca, Guanajuato, has been represented in the lower tiers of Mexican leagues since its early days—most notably by Petroleros de Salamanca, the team that has historically played in the city. However, the club has seen several failed projects in recent years, ultimately folding for the last time in 2025 following multiple attempts at re-founding.

After a year without professional football in the city, the founding of a new local football team, Real Refineros, was announced on 27 July 2026; the team was registered in the Liga Premier, building upon the former Petroleros franchise that had been abandoned in 2025. The team was named in honor of the workers of Refinería Ingeniero Antonio M. Amor, an oil refinery established in Salamanca in 1950 that has become one of the city's economy pillars.

At its presentation, the club named former Chilean footballer Héctor Mancilla as the first head coach in its history.

== Stadium ==
The team will play its home matches at the Estadio Sección XXIV, a multi-use stadium in Salamanca, Guanajuato, Mexico. It is currently used mostly for football matches. The stadium has a capacity 10,000 people and opened in 1951.

== Players ==
=== First-team squad ===
As of 7 September 2026

Note: Flags indicate national team as defined under FIFA eligibility rules; some limited exceptions apply. Players may hold more than one non-FIFA nationality.

No.	Pos.	Nation	Player
1	GK	MEX	Esteban Lecourtois
2	DF	MEX	Eduardo Ruiz
3	DF	MEX	Diego Gutiérrez
4	DF	MEX	Rafael Ramírez
5	DF	COL	David Tamayo
6	MF	MEX	David Ramírez
7	MF	MEX	Juan Pablo Lara
8	MF	COL	Jhon Cano
9	FW	MEX	Sergio García
10	MF	MEX	Francisco Negrete
11	FW	MEX	Moisés Percastre
12	GK	MEX	Bruno Velázquez
13	FW	MEX	Dylan Martínez
14	FW	MEX	Carlos Muñoz

No.	Pos.	Nation	Player
16	DF	MEX	Owen Parra
17	MF	MEX	Kevin González
19	DF	MEX	Paulocesar Castillo
20	FW	MEX	Luis Ángel Hernández
21	MF	MEX	Cristóbal Pichardo
22	MF	MEX	Erik Torres
23	DF	MEX	Christopher Calderón
24	DF	MEX	Bryan Alcántara
26	DF	MEX	Aldo Cornejo
30	FW	MEX	Matías Mancilla
31	MF	MEX	Alexander Vargas
32	MF	MEX	Nicolás Ruiz
33	GK	MEX	Carlos Pineda
35	MF	MEX	Leonel Solorzano

== Reserves ==
=== Real Refineros TDP ===
Reserve team that plays in the Liga TDP, the fourth level of Mexican football.
