= Estadio Jalisco =

Football stadium located in Guadalajara, Jalisco, Mexico

Coordinates: 20°42′18″N 103°19′41″W

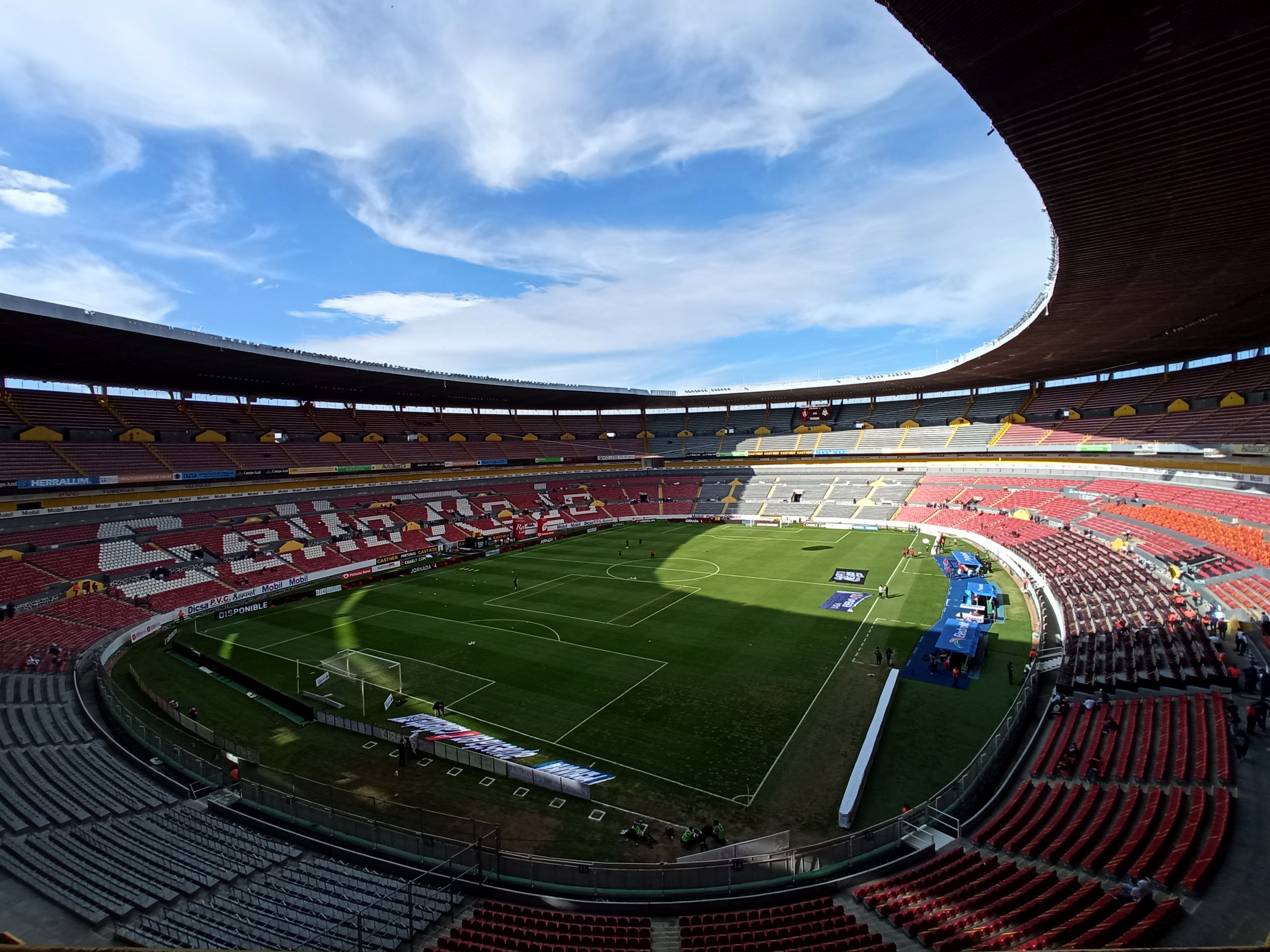
- Interactive map of Estadio Jalisco
- Full name: Estadio Jalisco
- Location: Guadalajara, Jalisco, Mexico
- Owner: Clubes Unidos de Jalisco
- Capacity: 53,937
- Surface: Grass
- Field size: 105 x 70 m

Construction
- Built: 20 November 1952
- Opened: 31 January 1960
- Renovated: 1970 (FIFA World Cup), 1999, and 2017
- Expanded: 1983 (FIFA World Youth Championship)
- Cost: 34 million MXN
- Architects: Constructora Jalisco S.A. de C.V. Constructora ARVA S.A. de C.V.

Tenants
- Atlas (1960–present); U.D.G. (1970–present); Guadalajara (1960–2010); Oro (1960–1970); Nacional (1961–1965); Jalisco (1970–1980); CAFESSA Jalisco (2019–2020)

Website
- estadiojalisco.mx

Jalisco Stadium is a football stadium located in Guadalajara, Jalisco. It is the third-largest Mexican football stadium behind Estadio Azteca and Estadio Olímpico Universitario with a capacity of 53,937 spectators.

== History ==
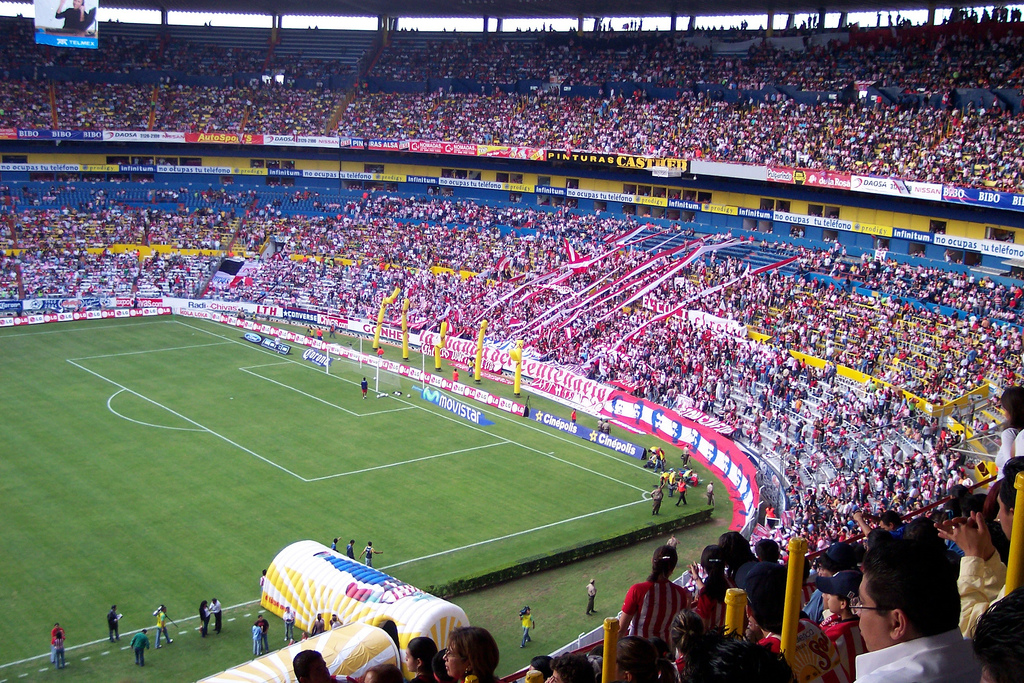
View of the Estadio Jalisco in 2006.

It is the home stadium of Atlas in the Liga MX and Club Universidad de Guadalajara in the Liga de Expansión MX. Several football preliminary matches took place for the 1968 Summer Olympics.

The stadium hosted games in two separate FIFA World Cups in 1970 and 1986. During both of those tournaments the Estadio Jalisco was the temporary home of the Brazilian national team and today remains a liaison between the people of Guadalajara and the Brazilian national team. The stadium is centrally located in the heart of the neighborhood called Colonia Independencia, and is in front of the Plaza de Toros Nuevo Progreso ("New Progress" Bullring).

The stadium also hosted eight games in the 1999 FIFA Confederations Cup, including the third-place game.

=== 1970 FIFA World Cup ===
The stadium hosted eight matches in the 1970 FIFA World Cup, including six group matches, a quarterfinal, and the semifinal in which Brazil defeated Uruguay 3-1.

=== 1986 FIFA World Cup ===
The stadium hosted six matches in the 1986 FIFA World Cup, including all three group matches involving Brazil, a round-of-16 match, a quarterfinal, and a semifinal. Brazil played in every single game the stadium hosted except one of the semifinals where it was hoped Brazil would play as well but it didn't happen as the French men's national football team defeated Brazil on penalties in the quarterfinals.

== Renovations ==
On 31 January 2017, Clubes Unidos de Jalisco announced a renovation project to replace seating at the Jalisco, to replace the deteriorating roof, to remodel dressing rooms and add a large 360 degree screen above the field. The 360 screen was set to debut during the match vs Tigres UANL on 8 September 2017; however, it was determined that the match would be suspended due to the screen being installed merely 8 meters above the field, thus making it impossible for regular gameplay.

== See also ==
- List of football stadiums in Mexico
- Lists of stadiums
