= Cristián Oviedo (Chilean footballer) =

Chilean footballer (born 1980)

Cristian Oviedo
Personal information
- Full name: Cristian Gonzalo Oviedo Molina
- Date of birth: 22 May 1980 (age 46)
- Place of birth: Talcahuano, Chile
- Height: 1.79 m (5 ft 10 1/2 in)
- Position: Centre-back

Senior career*
| Years | Team | Apps | (Gls) |
| 2000 | Deportes Talcahuano | | |
| 2001–2002 | Universidad de Concepción | | |
| 2003–2004 | Huachipato | 40 | (0) |
| 2005 | Naval | | |
| 2006–2007 | Lota Schwager | 89 | (5) |
| 2008–2010 | Everton | 106 | (1) |
| 2011 | O'Higgins | 34 | (0) |
| 2012–2014 | Audax Italiano | 56 | (1) |
| 2014 | Santiago Morning | 13 | (0) |
| 2015–2016 | Deportes Iquique | 40 | (1) |
| 2016 | San Antonio Unido | 12 | (0) |
| 2017–2018 | Cobreloa | 33 | (0) |
| 2019 | Naval | 1 | (0) |
| Total | | 424+ | (8) |
- * Club domestic league appearances and goals

Cristián Gonzalo Oviedo Molina (born 22 May 1980) is a Chilean former professional footballer who played as a centre-back.

During a career spent primarily in Chilean football, he represented clubs including Universidad de Concepción, Huachipato, Lota Schwager, Everton, O'Higgins, Audax Italiano, Deportes Iquique and Cobreloa.

He won the Chilean Primera División with Everton in 2008.

== Club career ==
Oviedo began his senior career in his native Concepción area, playing for Deportes Talcahuano before joining Universidad de Concepción. He later represented Huachipato and Naval, establishing himself as a central defender in Chilean professional football.

In 2006, Oviedo joined Lota Schwager in the Primera B. He was a regular in the club's defence as Lota challenged near the top of the division.

=== Everton ===
Oviedo immediately became a regular starter for Everton under manager Nelson Acosta. He made 17 appearances during the 2008 Apertura, as the Viña del Mar club reached the championship final against Colo-Colo. Oviedo started both legs of the final, including the 3–0 victory at the Estadio Sausalito in the return match that overturned a 2–0 first-leg deficit and gave Everton its first league championship in 32 years.

=== Late career ===
For the 2011 season, Oviedo joined O'Higgins. He immediately established himself in the starting defence, making 18 appearances in the Apertura and 15 in the Clausura. O'Higgins reached the semi-finals of the Apertura, where Oviedo started both matches against eventual champions Universidad de Chile.

In December 2011, Oviedo signed for Audax Italiano. Upon his arrival, he described playing in Santiago as a new challenge after spending most of his career with provincial clubs. He spent three seasons with the club. In August 2012, Oviedo scored against Universidad de Chi3le with a long-range strike in a 2–1 defeat at the Estadio Santa Laura.

After a brief spell with Santiago Morning, Oviedo joined Deportes Iquique ahead of the 2015 Clausura, becoming one of the club's new signings alongside César Pinares and Sebastián Toro. He remained with Iquique until 2016, when he left the club and subsequently played for San Antonio Unido.

In January 2017, Oviedo signed for Cobreloa in the Primera B under manager José Sulantay, arriving from San Antonio Unido. He played for the Calama club during the final stage of his professional career before retiring from professional football.

== Personal life ==
Following the COVID-19 pandemic, Oviedo began to work as a chauffeur for the Biobío Regional Presidential Delegation.

== Honours ==
=== Club ===
Lota Schwager

- Primera B Promotion Playoffs (1): 2006

Everton

- Primera División de Chile (1): 2008 Apertura
