= Estadio Rafael Hernández Ochoa =

Stadium in Coatzacoalcos, Mexico

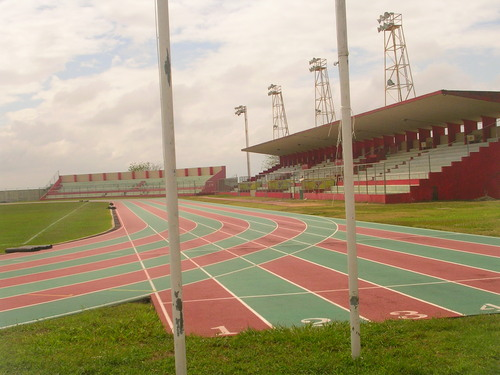
- Interactive map of Estadio Rafael Hernández Ochoa
- Location: Coatzacoalcos, Veracruz, Mexico
- Coordinates: 18.1345°N 94.4611°W
- Owner: Coatzacoalcos City Council
- Capacity: 4,800

Construction
- Opened: 2003

Tenants
- Delfines de Coatzacoalcos (2003–2006, 2024–present); Tiburones Rojos de Coatzacoalcos (2006–2008)

The Estadio Rafael Hernández Ochoa is a multi-use stadium in Coatzacoalcos, Veracruz, Mexico. It is currently used mostly for football matches and is the home stadium for Delfines de Coatzacoalcos. The stadium has a capacity of 4,800 people.
