= Guerreros del Pacífico F.C. =

Mexican football club

Guerreros del Pacífico
- Full name: Guerreros del Pacífico Fútbol Club
- Nickname: Guerreros (The warriors)
- Founded: 28 May 2026; 4 months ago
- Ground: Unidad Deportiva Acapulco; Acapulco, Guerrero
- Capacity: 13,000
- Owner: José Andrés Ríos Ortega
- Chairman: José Andrés Ríos Ortega
- Manager: Arturo Juárez
- League: Liga Premier (Premier A)
- 2026–27: Pre–season
Home colours	Away colours

Guerreros del Pacífico Fútbol Club is a Mexican football club that plays in the Premier A, the intermediate branch of the Liga Premier de México, the third tier of Mexican football. The club is based in Acapulco, Guerrero.

== History ==
Despite the importance of the city of Acapulco within Mexico, no major team has managed to establish itself there; throughout its history, various projects, have come and gone, lasting only a few years in the city despite launching with ambitious plans.

While this was happening in Acapulco, teams had established themselves in Chilpancingo, the capital of Guerrero, and managed to maintain a lasting presence there; however, they face limited growth prospects due to economic, urban, and security issues in the capital. A notable example is C.D. Avispones de Chilpancingo, which earned promotion to the Liga Premier de México in 2022.

On 27 April 2026, it was announced that Avispones de Chilpancingo would begin a relocation process from Chilpancingo to Acapulco due to the existence of better conditions for the team's growth in the city. Finally, on May 28, the new project named Guerreros del Pacífico F.C. was presented, which meant the end of the original Chilpacingo franchise after 38 years of existence. The new team was named Guerreros del Pacífico, reviving a historic name from local football, Guerreros de Acapulco, while also highlighting the city's geographical location on the Pacific coast.

== Stadium ==
Guerreros del Pacífico will play its home matches at the Unidad Deportiva Acapulco (English:Acapulco Sports Complex), which is a sports complex composed of a 13,000-seat football and track and field stadium and a baseball stadium which can seat thousands.

== Players ==
=== First-team squad ===
As of September 5, 2026

Note: Flags indicate national team as defined under FIFA eligibility rules; some limited exceptions apply. Players may hold more than one non-FIFA nationality.

No.	Pos.	Nation	Player
1	GK	MEX	Héctor Ordáz
2	DF	MEX	Ángel Magaña
3	DF	MEX	Pedro del Ángel
4	DF	MEX	Isaác León
5	DF	MEX	Alberto Rodríguez de Castro
6	DF	MEX	Alberto Gamaliel Rodríguez
7	FW	MEX	Julio Quevedo
8	MF	MEX	Edzohl Valdovinos
9	FW	MEX	Jesús Dávila
10	MF	MEX	Osmar Duarte
11	MF	COL	Yefersson Quiroga
12	GK	MEX	Ángel Romero

No.	Pos.	Nation	Player
13	DF	MEX	Oreste Radilla
14	MF	MEX	Fermín Díaz
17	DF	MEX	José Martínez
19	MF	MEX	Josué Mejía
21	MF	MEX	Obed Valdovinos
22	MF	MEX	Wilver Dorantes
24	DF	MEX	José Ortega
26	MF	MEX	Jared García
27	MF	MEX	Jorkaef Candela
28	DF	MEX	Juan Noyola
30	MF	MEX	Ernesto Romero
33	FW	COL	Yerson Rivas

== Reserves ==
=== Guerreros del Pacífico TDP ===
Reserve team that plays in the Liga TDP, the fourth level of Mexican football.
