= Estadio Eugenio Alvizo Porras =

- Interactive map of Estadio Eugenio Alvizo Porras
- Full name: Estadio Eugenio Alvizo Porras
- Location: Ciudad Victoria, Tamaulipas, Mexico
- Coordinates: 23°43′5″N 99°9′2″W
- Owner: UAT
- Capacity: 5,000
- Surface: Natural grass

Construction
- Opened: 1979
- Renovated: 2022

Tenants
- Correcaminos UAT Premier (1980–); Correcaminos UAT (ONEFA)(1996–)

Estadio Eugenio Alvizo Porras is a multi-use stadium in Ciudad Victoria, Tamaulipas, Mexico. It is currently used mostly for football and american football matches. The stadium has a capacity of 5,000 people and opened in 1979.
