= Estadio Luis "Pirata" Fuente =

Football stadium in Veracruz, Mexico

- Coloso del Fraccionamiento Virginia "Colossus of the Virginia neighborhood"
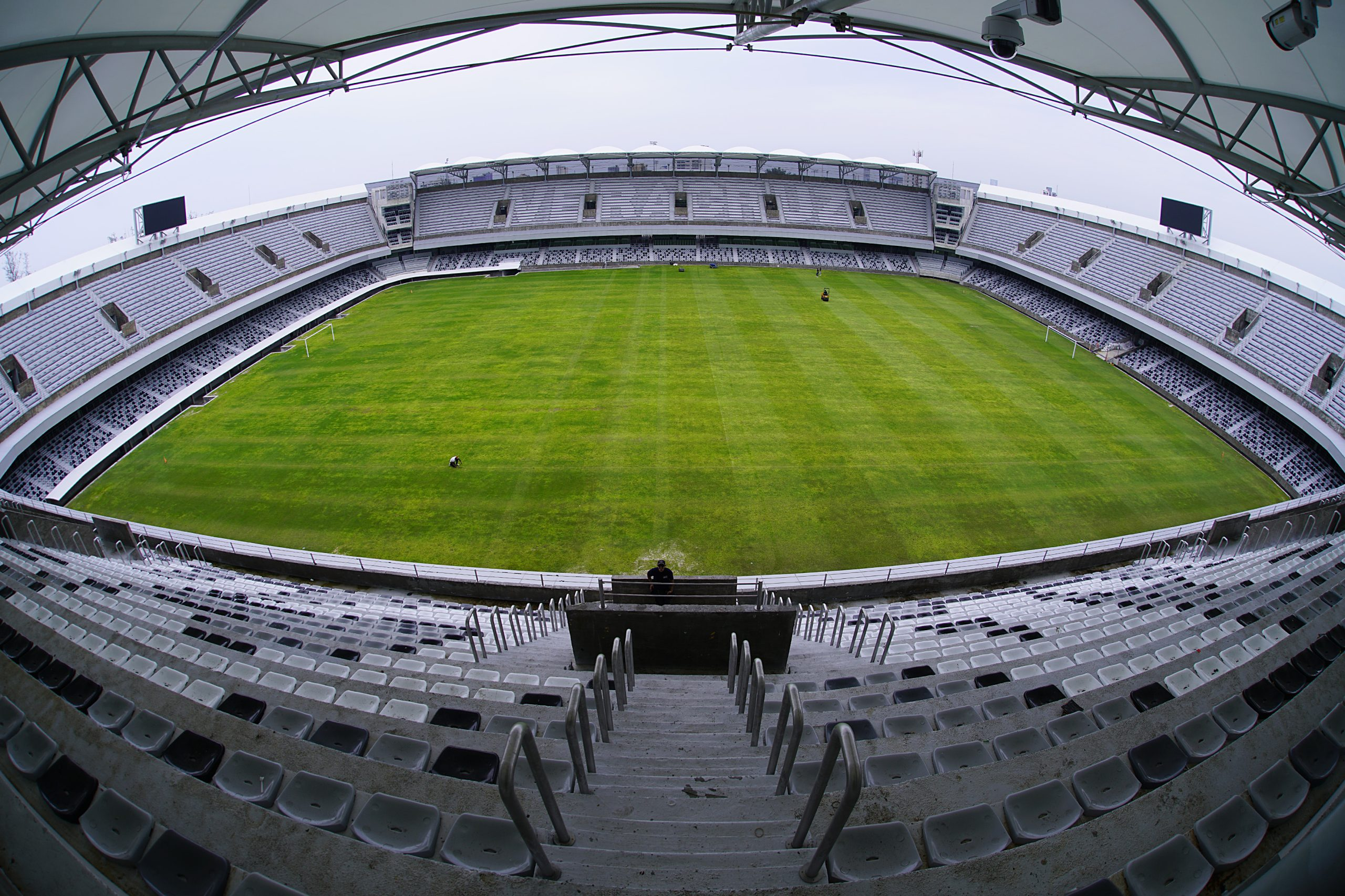
- Interactive map of Estadio Luis "Pirata" Fuente
- Location: Boca del Río, Veracruz
- Coordinates: 19°9′51″N 96°7′30″W
- Capacity: 28,703
- Surface: Grass
- Field size: 105 x 70 m

Construction
- Opened: 17 March 1967
- Renovated: 2025

Tenants
- Veracruz (1967–2019); Piratas de Veracruz (2026–)

The Estadio Luis "Pirata" Fuente is an association football stadium located at the seaside in Boca del Río, Veracruz, Mexico, with a capacity of 27,500. It is named in honour of Luis de la Fuente, a Mexican football star who played with C.D. Veracruz from 1943 to 1952. It was also the home of the Tiburones Rojos lit. 'Red Sharks' before the team's dissolution on 18 December 2019. This stadium is also called the Coloso del Fraccionamiento Virginia (lit. 'Colossus of the Virginia neighborhood').

== History ==
The stadium was inaugurated on March 17, 1967, it initially bore the name “Estadio Veracruzano.” Later, as a tribute to Luis de la Fuente, affectionately known as El Pirata and regarded as the greatest footballer from Veracruz, the venue was renamed Estadio Luis “Pirata” Fuente.

With a seating capacity of 30,000 spectators, El Pirata underwent a major renovation between 2003 and 2004. As part of this modernization, seats were installed throughout all sections, and a giant screen was added to enhance the fan experience.

It intermittently served as the home of Tiburones Rojos until their disaffiliation in 2019.

In December 2022, the government initiated a major reconstruction project aimed at attracting investors interested in bringing a professional football club to Veracruz. Renovations were completed in May 2025.

In 2026, it became the home of Piratas FC.

== Concerts ==
- Luis Miguel – 1 December 1995
- Luis Miguel – 12 March 2006
- Shakira – 18 May 2007
- Timbiriche – 13 July 2007
- Maná – 1 March 2008
- Elton John – 8 May 2010
- Ricky Martin – 26 October 2011
- Max Zamudio – 11 August 2018
- Shakira – 24 September 2025

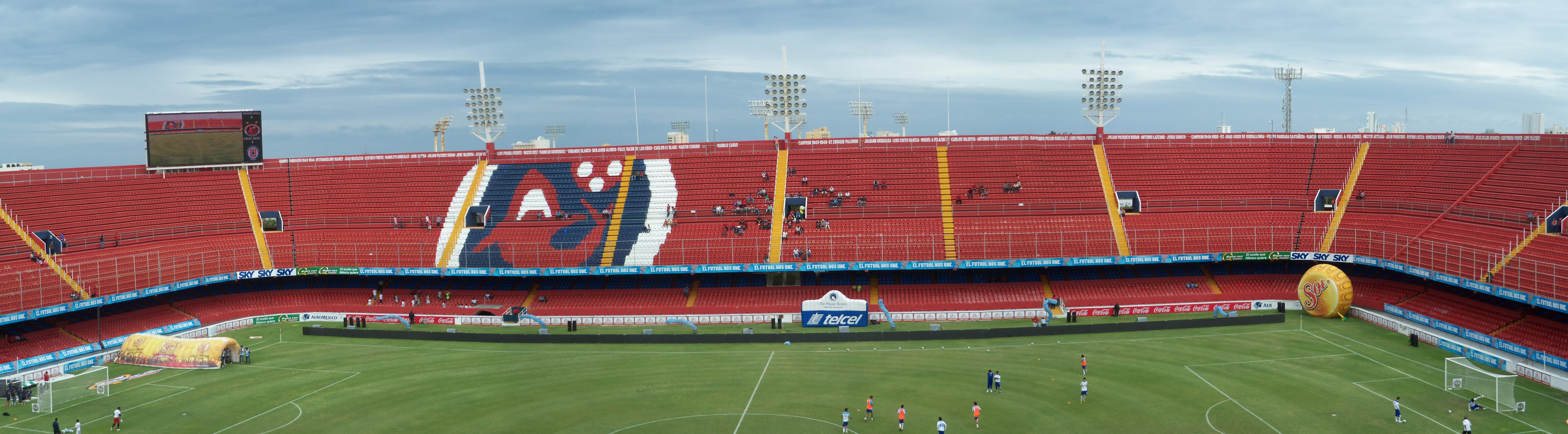

== See also ==
- List of football stadiums in Mexico
- Veracruz's Official site (stadium)
