= Estadio Sección XXIV =

Multi-use stadium in Salamanca, Guanajuato, Mexico

Estadio Olímpico Sección XXIV
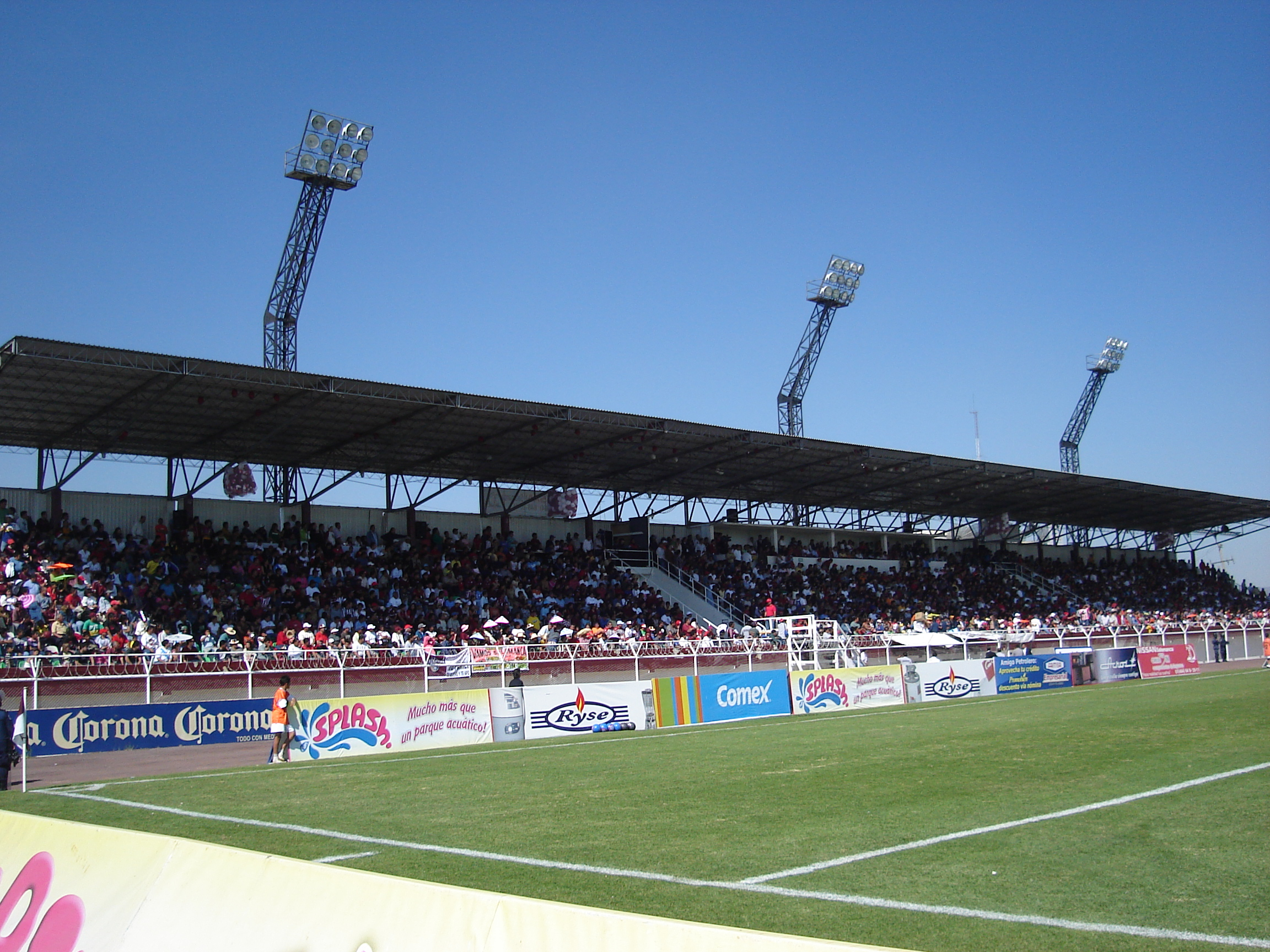
- Interactive map of Estadio Olímpico Sección XXIV
- Full name: Estadio Olímpico de la Sección XXIV del STPRM
- Location: Salamanca, Guanajuato, Mexico
- Coordinates: 20°34′43.38″N 101°11′35.61″W
- Owner: Sindicato de Trabajadores Petroleros de la República Mexicana
- Capacity: 10,000
- Surface: Natural grass

Construction
- Opened: 1951

Tenants
- Trotamundos Salamanca (2004); Petroleros de Salamanca (2005–2010) (2022), (2023–2024); Catedráticos Elite (2023); Real Refineros (2026–present)

Estadio Olímpico Sección XXIV is a multi-use stadium in Salamanca, Guanajuato, Mexico. It is currently used mostly for football matches. The stadium has a capacity 10,000 people and opened in 1951.
