= Unidad Deportiva Acapulco =

Sports complex in Acapulco, Mexico

Coordinates: 16.8649°N 99.9003°W

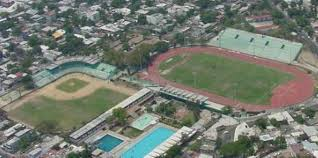
- Interactive map of Unidad Deportiva Acapulco
- Full name: Estadio de la Unidad Deportiva Acapulco
- Location: Acapulco, Guerrero, Mexico
- Owner: Government of Guerrero
- Capacity: 13,000
- Surface: Natural grass

Construction
- Opened: 12 October 1971
- Renovated: 2018, 2026

Tenants
- Inter de Acapulco (1973–1976, 1977–1978, 2014); Guerreros de Acapulco (1990–1991, 1994–1997, 2009–2012); Delfines de Acapulco (1991–1993, 2013–2019); Acapulco F.C. (1994–1997, 2020); Potros Guerrero (2001); Jaguares de Acapulco (2001–2004); Mantarrayas de Acapulco (2003); Cuatetes de Acapulco (2016–2018); Águilas UAGro (2019–2023); Guerreros del Pacífico (2026–)

Unidad Deportiva Acapulco (English:Acapulco Sports Complex) is a sports complex composed of a 13,000-seat football and track and field stadium and a baseball stadium which can seat thousands. The football/track stadium, which originally seated 8,600, is currently home to the Guerreros del Pacífico F.C. football team of the Mexican Segunda División, which began play in 2009. The baseball stadium is currently used for amateur and semi-pro baseball, and skateboarding.

The complex had been in poor condition for several years but has received major renovations in recent years. The grass fields were replaced in 2009 with artificial turf. Additionally, the bathrooms, locker rooms and offices have been refurbished, and a new roof was installed on the football/track stadium's main grandstand. The cost of the renovations was $2.5 million pesos. The complex was completed in 1975.

The complex also includes an Olympic-sized swimming pool and basketball courts.

Other events that have been held at the complex have been track meets, concerts, lucha libre, and boxing. Should Acapulco receive a Mexican Baseball League expansion team, the baseball stadium could either be expanded or rebuilt to seat over 10,000. And should los Guerreros be promoted to the Liga de Ascenso the football/track stadium could be expanded to seat as many as 19,000, and should the team be promoted to the Primera Division de Mexico, additional construction could push the football/track stadium's capacity to as high as twice its current capacity.

The complex was severely damaged by Hurricane Otis when it struck Acapulco in October 2023.
