= List of indoor arenas in India =

This is a list of indoor arenas in India that have been used for major indoor matches. The minimum capacity is 1,000.

== Indoor arena ==
Name	City	State	Est.	Capacity	Tenants	Notes	Image
Abhay Prashal Indoor Stadium	Indore	Madhya Pradesh	1994	10,000			
Anna Stadium	Tiruchirappalli	Tamil Nadu	1970	4,000			
Babu Banarasi Das Indoor Stadium	Lucknow	Uttar Pradesh	n/a	5,000			
Campal Indoor Complex	Campal	Goa	2014	4,000			
DDA Netaji Subhash Sports Complex	New Delhi	NCR	2000	2,000			
Dr. Shyama Prasad Mukherjee Indoor Stadium	Taleigão	Goa	2014	4,000			
G. M. C. Balayogi Indoor Stadium	Hyderabad	Telangana	2002	4,000			
Harivansh Tana Bhagat Indoor Stadium	Ranchi	Jharkhand	2011	4,000			
Hawla Indoor Stadium	Aizawl	Mizoram	2002	3,000			
Howrah Indoor Stadium	Howrah	West Bengal	1976	6,000			
Indira Gandhi Arena	New Delhi	NCR	1982	14,348	Indian Aces		
Indira Gandhi Sports Stadium	Pondicherry	Puducherry	1982	14,348			
ISKATE	Gurgaon	Haryana	2011	3,000			
Jawaharlal Nehru Stadium (Chennai)	Chennai	Tamil Nadu	1993	8,000			
Jaypee Integrated Sports Complex	Greater Noida	Uttar Pradesh	n/a	4,000			
Jimmy George Indoor Stadium	Thiruvananthapuram	Kerala	1987	2,000			
Kanteerava Indoor Stadium	Bengaluru	Karnataka	1995	4,000			
Kalinga Institute of Industrial Technology	Bhubaneswar	Odisha	2012	4,000			
Kotla Vijay Bhaskar Reddy Indoor Stadium	Hyderabad	Telangana	2003	4,000			
Maharana Pratap Khel Gaon	Udaipur	Rajasthan	2010	4,000			
Netaji Indoor Stadium	Kolkata	West Bengal	1950	12,126	Bengal Warriors		
Pandit Deendayal Upadhyay Indoor Stadium	Surat	Gujarat	1998	7,000			
Patliputra Sports Complex	Patna	Bihar	2000	3,500	Patna Pirates		
Port Trust Golden Jubilee Indoor Stadium	Visakhapatnam	Andhra Pradesh	2005	5,000			
Sardar Vallabhbhai Patel Indoor Stadium	Mumbai	Maharashtra	1950	5,000	U Mumba		
Rajiv Gandhi Indoor Stadium	Ernakulam	Kerala	1993	10,000			
SportX, Woxsen University	Hyderabad	Telangana	2023	2,000		[21]	
Saroornagar Indoor Arena	Hyderabad	Telangana	2000	2,000			
Shree Shiv Chhatrapati Sports Complex	Pune	Maharashtra	1993	3,800	Puneri Paltan		
Sri Sathya Sai International Centre for Sports	Puttaparthi	Andhra Pradesh	2006	5,000			
Siri Fort Indoor Arena	New Delhi	Delhi	1982	5,740			
Talkatora Indoor Stadium	New Delhi	NCR	1978	3,035			
Thyagaraj Sports Complex	New Delhi	NCR	2010	5,883	Dabang Delhi		
Triprayar Sports and Games Association Indoor Stadium	Triprayar	Kerala	2010	3,000			
University of Kashmir Convocation Complex	Srinagar	Kashmir	1981	3,000			
V.K.N. Menon Indoor Stadium	Thrissur	Kerala	1981	2,000			
War Heroes Stadium	Sangrur	Punjab	2010	1,000			
Yamuna Sports Complex	New Delhi	NCR	1999	4,297			
YSR Indoor Stadium	Yanam	Puducherry	2010	2,000			
Biju Pattnaik Indoor Stadium	Bhadrak	Odisha	Under Construction				

== See also ==
- List of cricket grounds in India
- List of stadiums in Hyderabad
- List of stadiums in India
- List of international cricket grounds in India
- List of Field hockey venues in India
- List of football stadiums in India
- Venues of the 2010 Commonwealth Games
- Lists of stadiums
