= SPM Swimming Pool Complex =

Sports venue in New Delhi, India

Coordinates: 28°37′20.84″N 77°11′34.53″E

Dr. S. P. Mukherjee Swimming Stadium
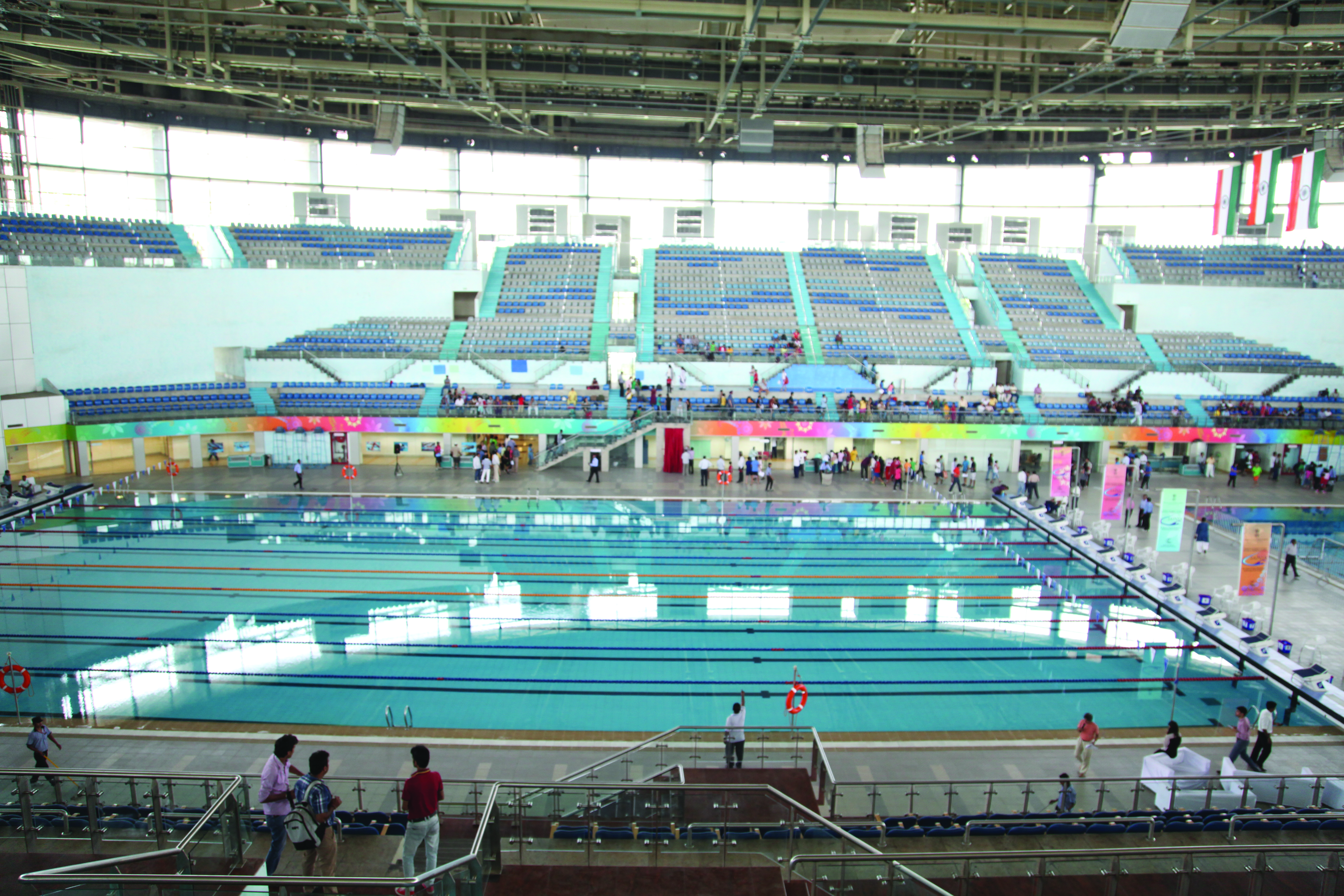
- Interactive map of Dr. S. P. Mukherjee Swimming Stadium
- Address: (India) New Delhi

Construction
- Opened: 18 July 2010

Website
- sportsauthorityofindia.nic.in/sai_new/stadiaSpmsp

The Dr. S. P. Mukherjee Swimming Stadium or SPM Swimming Pool Complex is a swimming complex in New Delhi, India, that hosted the aquatics events for the 2010 Commonwealth Games. Formerly known as Talkatora Swimming Pool, the stadium is situated inside the Talkatora Gardens complex in New Delhi, next to the Talkatora Indoor Stadium. It is owned by the Sports Authority of India (SAI). It was completely redeveloped at a cost of Rs 377 crore (U$84.89 million) for the Commonwealth Games. Today the complex is spread over 15,268 sq. mtrs, with 10-lane Olympic-size swimming pool and a 25-metre diving pool, and a seating capacity of 5,178 which makes it the largest covered aquatic stadium in India.

== History ==
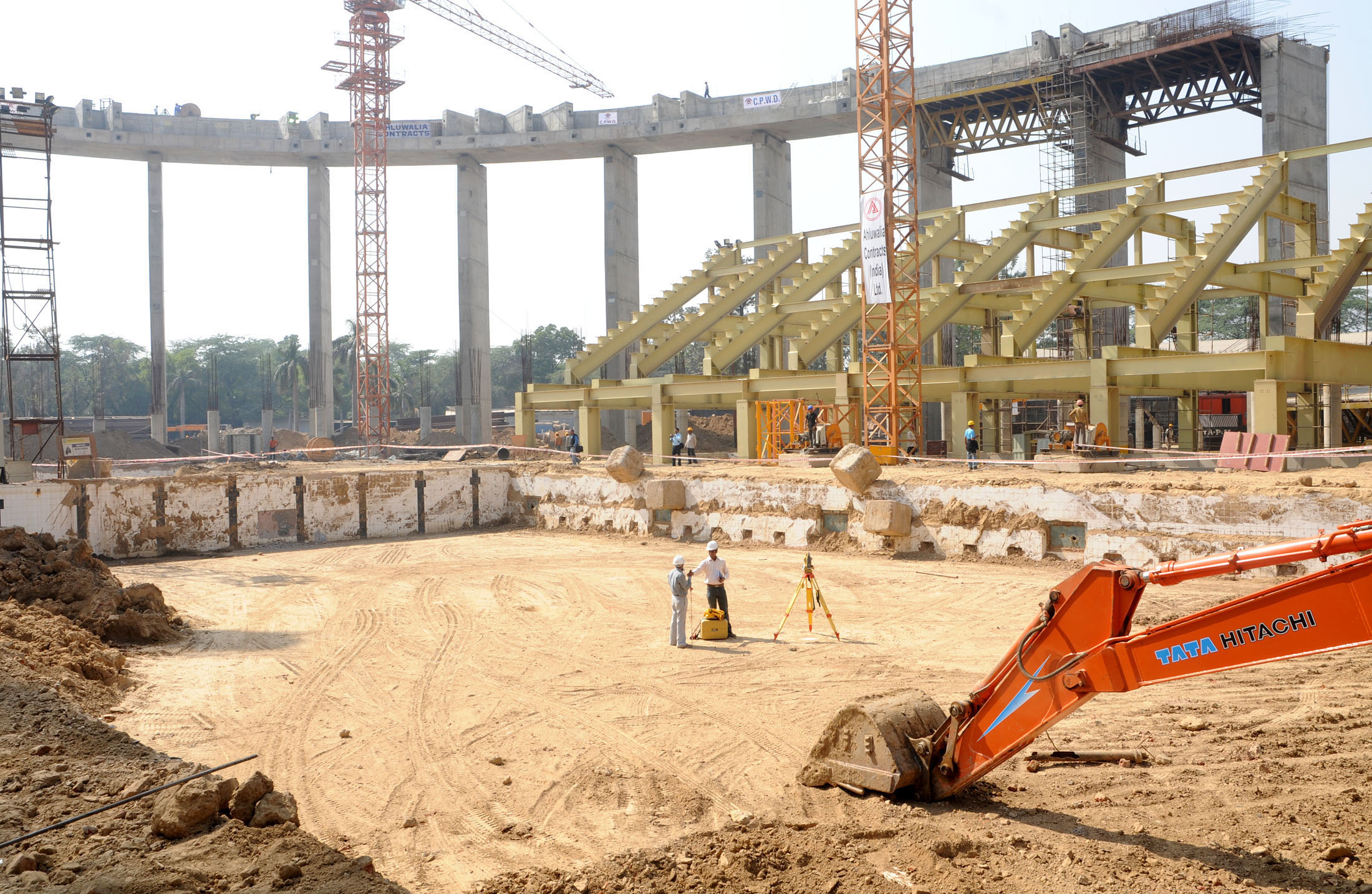
Construction work of the SPM Swimming Pool Complex at Talkatora Stadium, in 2009.

The aquatics complex was originally known as the Talkatora Swimming Pool, built by the New Delhi Municipal Council (NDMC) at Talkatora Gardens for the aquatic events of the 1982 Asian Games. It had two Olympic-size swimming pools, one indoor and one outdoor. Subsequently, it was later renamed the Dr. Syama Prasad Mookherjee Swimming Pool Complex after Syama Prasad Mukherjee. The venue underwent a major redevelopment ahead of the 2010 Commonwealth Games, where it hosted the aquatics events.

After the redevelopment the complex was inaugurated on 18 July 2010, ahead of the Commonwealth Games. It housed an Olympic-size 10-lane swimming pool and a 25-metre diving pool, and a seating capacity of 5,178, it was the largest covered aquatic stadium in India.

== Facilities ==
- One competition pool
- One diving pool
- One warm-up pool
- Skating Rink
- Billiards table
- Snooker
- Volleyball Court

== See also ==
- 2010 Commonwealth Games
- Talkatora Stadium
- DDA Netaji Subhash Sports Complex
- Yamuna Sports Complex
