= Swarnandhra Pradesh Sports Complex =

Sports complex in Gachibowli, Hyderabad, India

- Swarnandhra Pradesh Sports Complex, Gachibowli
- Full name: Swarnandhra Pradesh Sports Complex
- Location: Gachibowli, Hyderabad
- Owner: Government of Telangana
- Operator: Sports Authority of Telangana
- Capacity: 15,000

Construction
- Groundbreaking: 2009
- Built: 2010
- Opened: 2010
- Cost: Rs.3.5 crore.

Tenant
- Telangana Hockey Team

Swarnandhra Pradesh Sports Complex is a sports complex in Gachibowli, Hyderabad, India. It uses a synthetic turf with sophisticated sprinkler system for watering and drainage and has galleries with RC flat slabs and unique suspended steel roof structure. Pavilion housing the Federation Office and amenities including lounges for players, guests and media.

== See also ==
- Gachibowli Athletic Stadium
- Gachibowli Indoor Stadium
- List of stadiums in Hyderabad, India
