= Sports in Hyderabad =

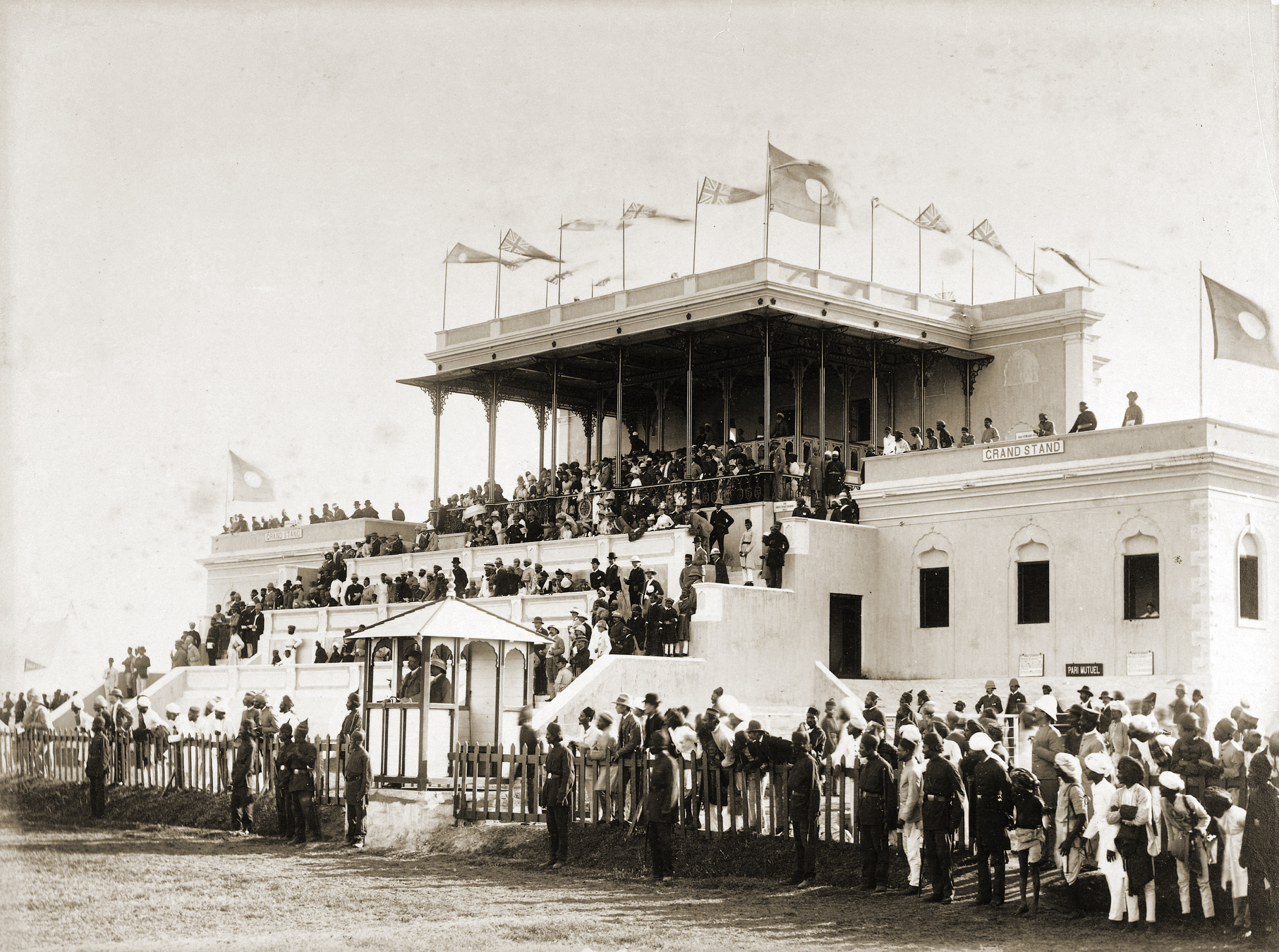
The Grand Stand of the Hyderabad Race Course, c. 1880s

The most popular sports played in Hyderabad are cricket and association football. At the professional level, the city has hosted national and international sporting events.

The city had produced highest number of Olympian footballers in India. Field hockey and cricket are popular among the current generation and apart from modern sports the Indian traditional wrestling (known as Kushti or Pehlwani) is popular among all group of people in Hyderabad.

== History ==
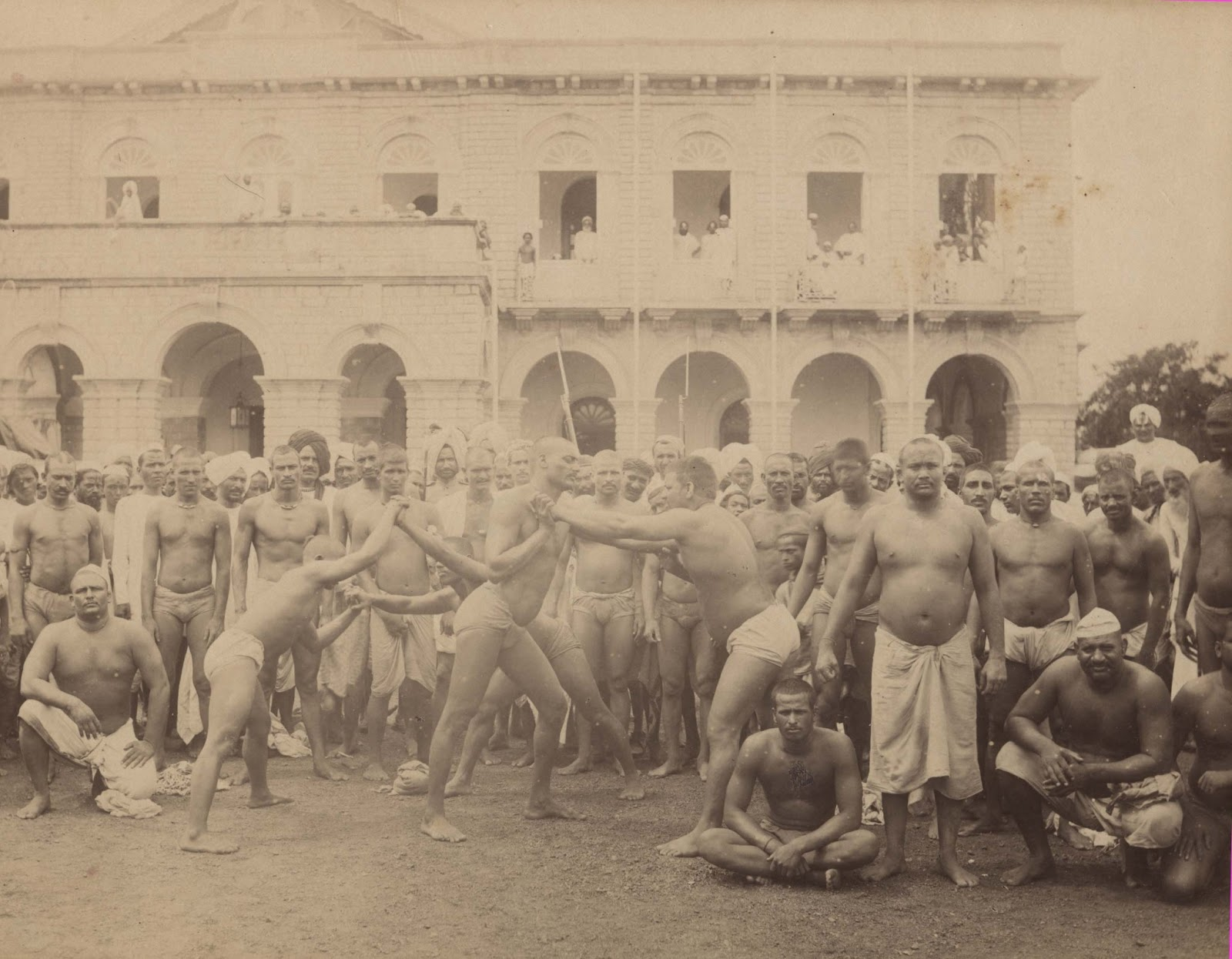
During 1870: Hyderabadi Pahelwans preparing for kushti

During the rule of the Nizams of Hyderabad, the Nizams as well as the nobility patronized the games. The sixth Nizam, or Asaf Jah VI was fond of horse racing and established the Hyderabad Race Club in 1868.

A Paigah nobleman, Moin ud-Dowlah established the Moin-ud-Dowlah Gold Cup Tournament in 1930.

Football became the most popular sport in Hyderabad during the "Golden Period" from the 1950s to the 1970s. During this period, Hyderabad-based players formed the nucleus of the Indian Football Team. The prominent players of this time include Syed Abdul Rahim, Peter Thangaraj and Shabbir Ali.

== Events ==
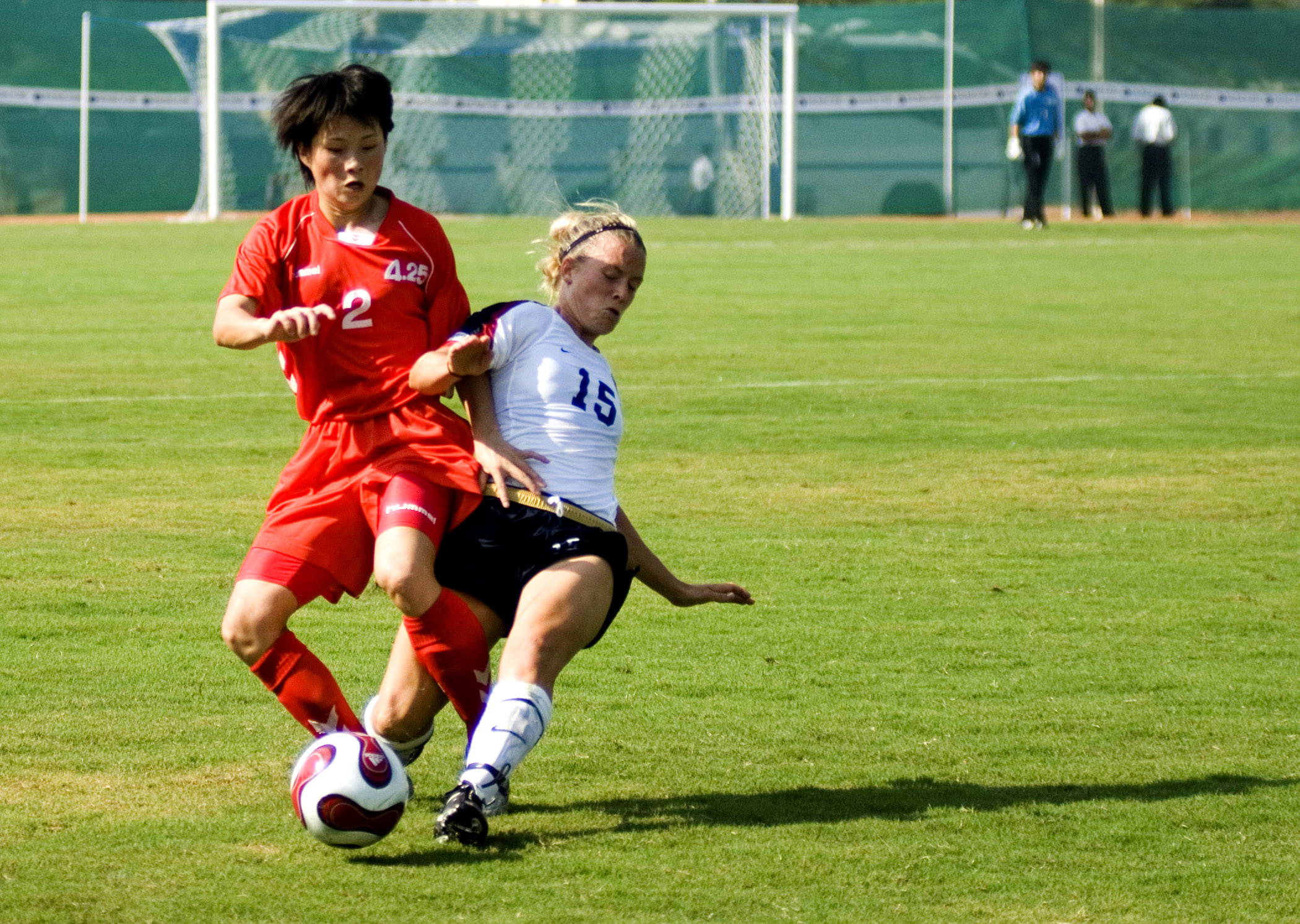
A scene from the 2007 Military World Games.

At the professional level, the city has hosted national and international sports events such as the 2002 National Games of India, the 2003 Afro-Asian Games, the 2004 AP Tourism Hyderabad Open women's tennis tournament, the 2007 Military World Games, the 2009 World Badminton Championships and the 2009 IBSF World Snooker Championship.

Regular events held in Hyderabad are; Moin-ud-Dowlah Gold Cup Tournament and Deccan Derby.

The city is set to host the Hyderabad ePrix from 2022 onwards, as a part of the Formula E calendar

== Sports persons ==
International-level sportspeople from Hyderabad include: cricketers Ghulam Ahmed, M. L. Jaisimha, mahesh devnani, Mohammed Azharuddin, V. V. S. Laxman, Venkatapathy Raju, Shivlal Yadav, Arshad Ayub, Syed Abid Ali, Mithali Raj and Noel David; football players Syed Abdul Rahim, Syed Khaja Moinuddin, Syed Nayeemuddin and Shabbir Ali; tennis player Sania Mirza; badminton players S. M. Arif, Pullela Gopichand, Saina Nehwal, P. V. Sindhu, Jwala Gutta and Chetan Anand; hockey players Syed Mohammad Hadi and Mukesh Kumar; rifle shooters Gagan Narang and Asher Noria and bodybuilder Mir Mohtesham Ali Khan. Abbas Ali Baig. He played ten test matches in a career spanning 21 years, he scored 12,367 runs in first-class cricket at an average of 34.16.

== Sports and Stadiums ==
The Lal Bahadur Shastri Stadium. The new Rajiv Gandhi International Cricket Stadium has a capacity of 55,000 spectators, including an ultra-modern Gymnasium along with a swimming pool. It has been recently accorded Test match status by the International Cricket Council. and serves as a home ground of Hyderabad Cricket Association.

The Swarnandhra Pradesh Sports Complex and the G. M. C. Balayogi Athletic Stadium at Gachibowli are associated specially for Field hockey and football. SAAP Tennis Complex has a central court that holds 4000 spectators and has seven courts with synthetic surface, a sophisticated Velodrome for cycling at Osmania University. The Saroornagar Indoor Arena and The Kotla Vijay Bhaskar Reddy Indoor Stadium are multi-purpose indoor sports facilities for, Table tennis, Basketball, Equestrianism, Boxing, Powerlifting, Gymnastics, Archery, Sepak takraw and Shooting. The Aquatics Complex Stadium at Gachibowli, can host all water sports and synchronized events, with a capacity of 3000 spectators. Water games like rowing, yachting, kayaking, and canoeing are conducted at Hussain Sagar lake. The city also has five Kart racing tracks and a Paintball Field.

- G. M. C. Balayogi Athletic Stadium

This stadium has a capacity of 30,000 spectators. It is an ultra modern stadium with 8 line competition synthetic athletic track and 4-lane synthetic practice track. It uses the latest high-mast lighting for day-night events and provides obstruction-free viewing for all spectators and is a very picturesque stadium amidst breath-taking landscape.

- G. M. C. Balayogi Indoor Stadium

This stadium has a capacity of around 5,000 spectators, fully air-conditioned, and a multi-purpose stadium. It has wooden flooring which is approved by International Federation and is up to DIN standards.

- Aquatics Complex

This stadium has a capacity of 2000 spectators, is an aquatic complex for swimming, diving, water polo and synchronized events. It is a temperature controlled pool through modern heating systems and fibre-reinforced polymer filters.

- Swarnandhra Pradesh Sports Complex

Located in Gachibowli, this sports complex uses a synthetic turf with sophisticated sprinkler system for watering and drainage and has galleries with RC flat slabs and unique suspended steel roof structure. Pavilion housing the Federation Office and amenities including lounges for players, guests and media.

- Fateh Maidan Sports Complex

One of the oldest sports establishments of the city, it is located at Basheerbagh in central Hyderabad. Literally translated, the name 'Fateh Maidan' means 'victory ground'. It consists of the Lal Bahadur Shastri Stadium, the newly constructed ultra-modern SAAP Tennis Complex & a multi-purpose Indoor Stadium among other establishments.

- The Lal Bahadur Stadium

This stadium has a capacity of 25,000 spectators and is equipped with floodlights around the field and provision of internal lights for the spectators. With dimensions 105 m x 70 m field and a 1-inch (25 mm) grass turf. The Stadium is run by the Sports Authority of Telangana, SAAP, was till recently the main cricket stadium for holding International cricket matches in the city.

- SAAP Tennis Complex, Fateh Maidan

This central court has a capacity of 4000 spectators and has a 7 top class synthetic surfaces.

- G. Bhaskar Rao Indoor Stadium

This multi-purpose stadium has a capacity of 2000 spectators and adopts a world class wooden flooring with temperature control.

- Shooting Range, Hyderabad Central University

This is an outdoor shooting range with a capacity of 600 spectators and facilities for 120 competitors at a time, with facilities for 15 different games at a time using latest electronic target equipment.

- Rajiv Gandhi International Cricket Stadium

This is an exclusive cricket stadium in Uppal, Hyderabad. It has a capacity of 55,000 spectators and is built over 16-acre (65,000 m^{2}) space. It provides one of the best facilities for the cricketers and best rest rooms in the world. The first match held in this stadium was between South Africa and India

== City based clubs ==
Club	Sport	League	Stadium	Span
Hyderabad cricket team	Cricket	Ranji Trophy/Vijay Hazare Trophy/Syed Mushtaq Ali Trophy	Rajiv Gandhi International Cricket Stadium	1934–
Hyderabad women's cricket team	Cricket	Senior Women's One-Day Trophy/Senior Women's T20 Trophy	Rajiv Gandhi International Cricket Stadium	2006-07 -
Hyderabad Heroes	Cricket	ICL	Lal Bahadur Shastri Stadium	2007–2009
Deccan Chargers (Hyderabad)	Cricket	IPL	Rajiv Gandhi International Cricket Stadium	2008–2012
Sunrisers Hyderabad	Cricket	IPL	Rajiv Gandhi International Cricket Stadium	2013–
Hyderabad Sultans	Field hockey	PHL	G. M. C. Balayogi Athletic Stadium	2005–2008
Hyderabad Chargers	Volleyball	IVL	Kotla Vijay Bhaskar Reddy Indoor Stadium	2011
Hyderabad HotShots	Badminton	PBL	G. M. C. Balayogi Indoor Stadium	2013–2015
Hyderabad Aces	Tennis	CTL	Lal Bahadur Shastri Stadium, Hyderabad	2014–2015
Hyderabad FC	Football	Indian Super League	G. M. C. Balayogi Indoor Stadium	2019–2025
Fateh Hyderabad A.F.C	Football	I-League 2	Lal Bahadur Shastri Stadium	2015–
Hyderabad Sky	Basketball	UBA Pro Basketball League	G. M. C. Balayogi Indoor Stadium	2015–2017
Hyderabad Hunters	Badminton	PBL	G. M. C. Balayogi Indoor Stadium	2016–
Telugu Titans	Kabaddi	PKL	G. M. C. Balayogi Indoor Stadium	2015–
Telugu Warriors	Cricket	CCL	Rajiv Gandhi International Cricket Stadium	2011–
Hyderabad Kings	Cricket	Telangana Premier League	Lal Bahadur Shastri Stadium	2016
Hyderabad Bulls	Kabaddi	Telangana Premier Kabaddi	G. M. C. Balayogi Indoor Stadium	2017–
Kings Hyderabad	Poker	Poker Sports League		2017–
Hyderabad Hustlers	Cue Sports	Indian Cue Masters League		2017–

== Gallery ==
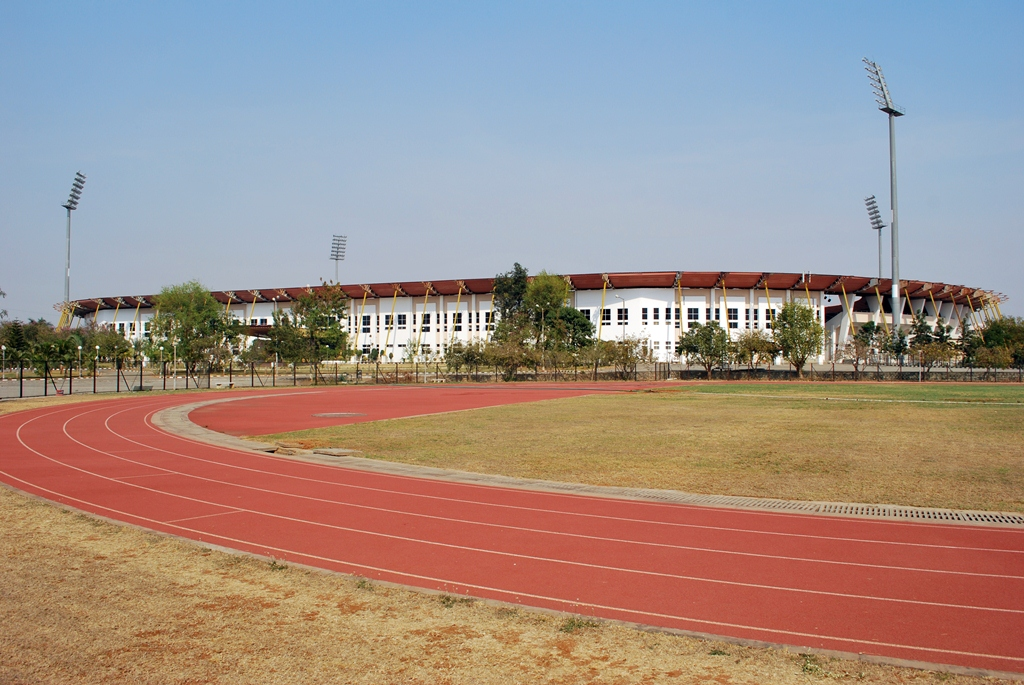
G. M. C. Balayogi Athletic Stadium

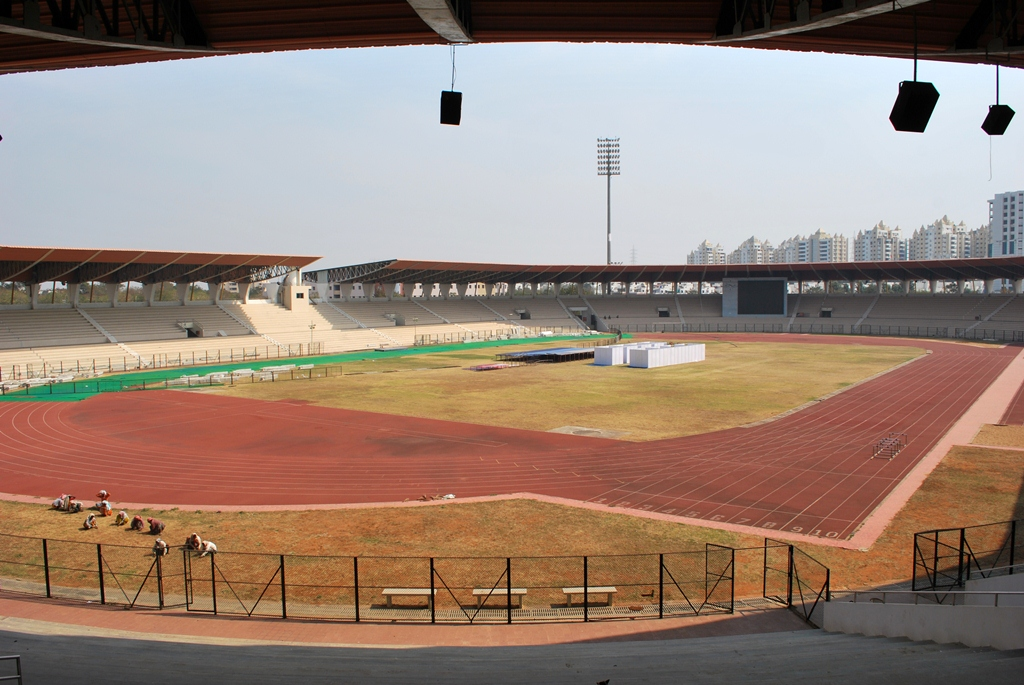
G. M. C. Balayogi Athletic Stadium

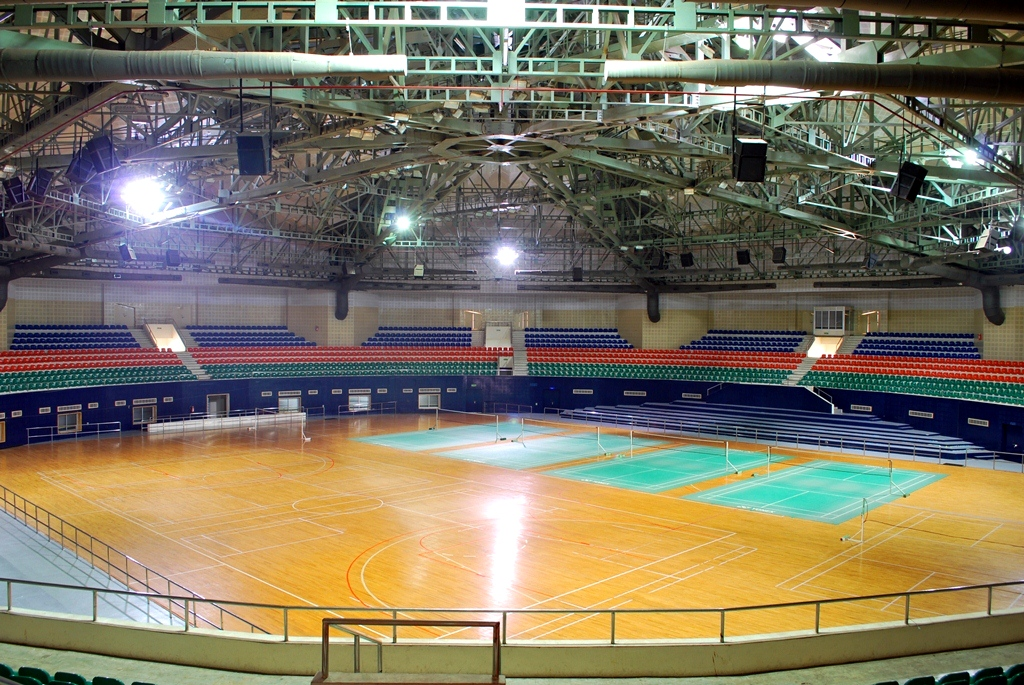
G. M. C. Balayogi SATS Indoor Stadium

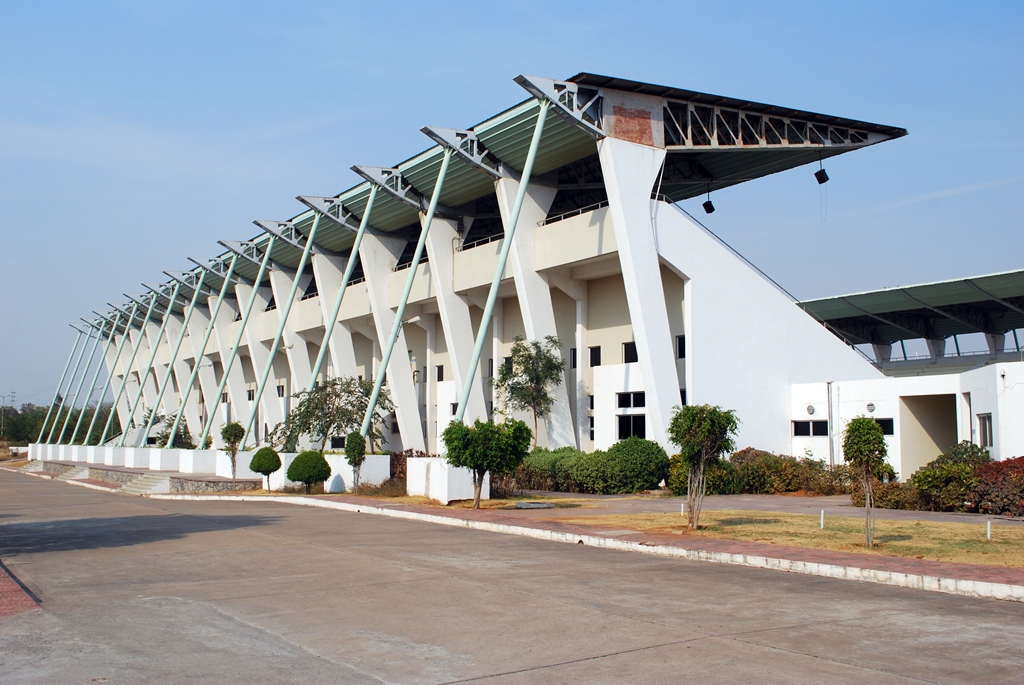
Gachibowli Aquatic Complex

Swarnandhra Pradesh Sports Complex, Gachibowli

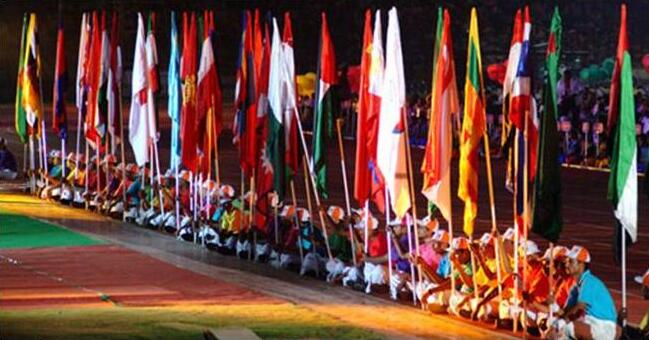
A view of the Participants' flag-bearers.
