= 2020 National Games of India =

Cancelled multi-sport event in Goa, India

- Host city: Goa, India
- Teams: 37 (expected)
- Athletes: 7000 (expected)
- Events: 30
- Opening: 20 October 2020 (planned)
- Closing: 4 November 2020 (planned)

The 2020 National Games of India, also known as Goa 2020, were to have been held between 20 October and 4 November 2020 in Goa.

In May 2020, it was announced that games would be indefinitely postponed as a result of the global COVID-19 pandemic. They were ultimately cancelled with the next national games scheduled to be held between 27 September and 10 October 2022 in Gujarat.

== Expected teams ==
Teams were expected from all 28 states and eight union territories of India as well a team representing Indian Armed Forces. The new union territories of Ladakh and Dadra and Nagar Haveli and Daman and Diu were expected to have made their National Games debut at these games.

== Marketing ==
The official logo of the games and the mascot, Rubigula the Flame-Throated Bulbul, were unveiled in January 2020.

== Venues ==
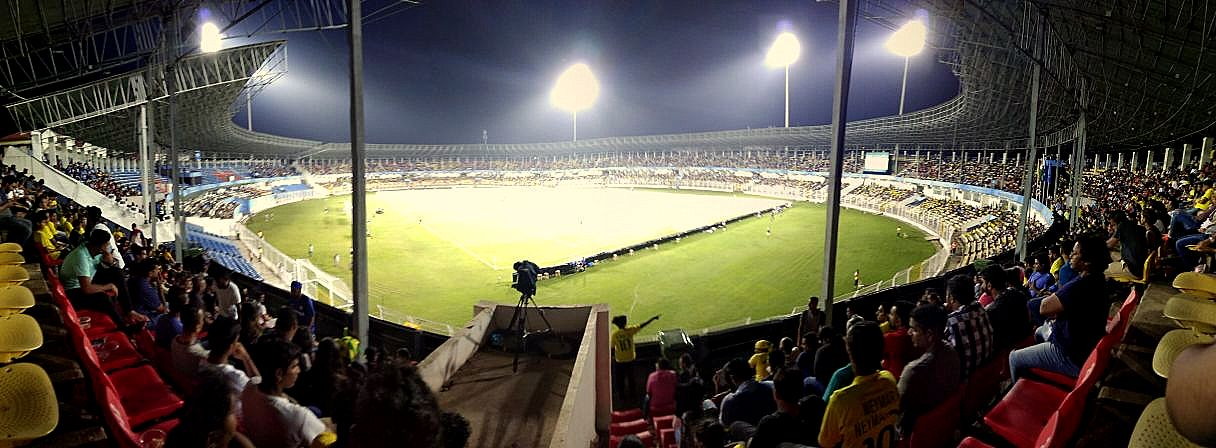
Fatorda Stadium was to have hosted the opening and closing ceremonies

Venues that were to have been used during the 2020 National Games included:

- GMC Athletic Stadium – athletics
- Campal Swimming Pool – aquatics
- Campal Indoor Complex – boxing, table tennis, wrestling
- Dr Shyama Prasad Mukherjee Indoor Stadium – basketball, volleyball
- Fatorda Stadium – opening and closing ceremonies
- Miramar Beach – beach handball, beach volleyball
- Peddem Indoor Stadium – badminton
- Tilak Maidan Stadium – football

== Sports ==
The games would have featured 37 sports as follows:

| Sports event | Number of medals |
|---|---|
| Aquatics | 50 |
| Archery | 15 |
| Athletics | 44 |
| Badminton | 7 |
| Baseball | 2 |
| Basketball | 2 |
| Beach handball | 2 |
| Beach volleyball | 2 |
| Billiards and snooker | 5 |
| Canoeing and kayaking | 36 |
| Cycling | 20 |
| Fencing | 12 |
| Football | 2 |
| Gymnastics | 20 |
| Handball | 2 |
| Field hockey | 2 |
| Judo | 14 |
| Kabaddi | 2 |
| Kho-kho | 2 |
| Lawn bowls | 8 |
| Modern pentathlon | 16 |
| Netball | 2 |
| Rowing | 18 |
| Rugby sevens | 2 |
| Shooting | 38 |
| Squash | 2 |
| Sepak takraw | 4 |
| Table tennis | 7 |
| Taekwondo | 16 |
| Tennis | 7 |
| Triathlon | 4 |
| Volleyball | 2 |
| Weightlifting | 15 |
| Wrestling | 24 |
| Wushu | 15 |
| Yachting | 4 |

== See also ==
- Khelo India Youth Games

| Preceded by 2015 National Games of India | National Games of India | Succeeded by 2022 National Games of India |
