= Hyderabad House (restaurant) =

Indian restaurant chain

Restaurant information
- Established: 1975
- Owner: Food Krafters & Services LLP
- Previous owner: Mir Mazharuddin
- Food type: Hyderabadi cuisine
- Dress code: casual
- Location: Hyderabad, Telangana, India
- Other locations: Texas, Illinois, Ohio, Georgia, Michigan, Arizona

Hyderabad House is a restaurant chain offering Hyderabadi cuisine. The chain is based in Hyderabad, Telangana, India and has over 23 outlets in various locations across South India.

== History ==
=== Origins (1975) ===
The roots of the Hyderabad House brand trace back to a catering and food business started by Mir Babar Ali in 1975. Initially, Mir Babar Ali set up a non-vegetarian food counter at the Hyderabad Race Club, serving appetizers like Lukmi and kebabs. His success quickly led to a flourishing catering service for private parties and canteens for various companies.

=== Founding of the Chain (1998) ===
The contemporary restaurant chain was formally established by Mir Babar Ali's son, Mir Mazharuddin, in 1998 (some sources indicate 1999). Mazharuddin transformed the family's catering business into a commercial restaurant venture, starting with a small take-away outlet in Masab Tank, Hyderabad.

A unique feature introduced by Mazharuddin, inspired by his international travels, was the concept of selling curries and cooked food by weight, rather than by a fixed portion size. This model was unique for Deccani cuisine vendors at the time and contributed to the restaurant's early popularity as a pioneer of takeaway food in the city.

=== Expansion and Acquisition ===
Under Mir Mazharuddin's leadership, Hyderabad House expanded significantly. By 2015, the chain had grown to approximately 40 outlets across India, with an international presence in locations such as Australia, Nepal, Saudi Arabia, and the UAE. The chain's growth attracted corporate interest, and in 2015, the Hyderabad House food chain was acquired by Food Krafters & Services LLP (FKS), a quick service restaurant (QSR) company. FKS, led by Khalil Ahmed, an entrepreneur and co-founder of Shanta Biotech, announced plans to invest heavily in the brand, including the addition of 50 new outlets and rebranding efforts.

=== The Original Outlet Revival (2021) ===
Following operational and financial issues, the original Hyderabad House entity associated with Mir Mazharuddin's family shut down in 2014. However, in late 2021, Mir Mazharuddin's son, Mir Zubair Ahmed, a third-generation owner, along with a partner, relaunched the original brand with a single outlet in Begumpet, Hyderabad. This revival sought to maintain the traditional recipes and the popular sale-by-weight model pioneered by his father.

== Cuisine ==
The restaurant chain is famous for its authentic Hyderabadi cuisine, with its signature dish being Hyderabadi Biryani (particularly Kacche Ghost ki Biryani). Other traditional Hyderabadi and Deccan delicacies offered include marag, kheema lukhmi, Shikampur kebab, and haleem.
