= 2000 ABC Under-18 Championship for Women =

2000 FIBA U18 Women's Asia Cup
15th FIBA Under-18 Women's Asian Basketball Championship

Tournament details
- Host country: India
- Dates: 16–22 December
- Teams: 11
- Venue: 1 (in 1 host city)

Final positions
- Champions: China (8th title)

Tournament statistics
- MVP: (China) Chen Nan

The ABC Under-18 Championship for Women 2000 is the 15th edition of the ABC's junior championship for basketball. The games were held at New Delhi, India from 16–22 December 2000.

== Draw ==
Group A	Group B
China; Japan; Malaysia; Sri Lanka; North Korea; India	Chinese Taipei; South Korea; Uzbekistan; Hong Kong; Thailand

== Preliminary round ==
=== Group A ===
Team	Pld	W	L	PF	PA	PD	Pts
China	5	5	0	502	237	+265	10
Japan	5	4	1	445	252	+193	9
North Korea	5	3	2	465	341	+124	8
Malaysia	5	2	3	242	334	−92	7
India	5	1	4	271	412	−141	6
Sri Lanka	5	0	5	199	548	−349	5

16 December
12:15

India	67–109	North Korea
Scoring by half: 23–61, 44–48

Talkatora Stadium, New Delhi

16 December
15:45

Malaysia	26–91	China
Scoring by half: 14–51, 12–40

Talkatora Stadium, New Delhi

16 December
17:30

Sri Lanka	33–129	Japan
Scoring by half: 12–72, 21–57

Talkatora Stadium, New Delhi

17 December
9:00

China	128–29	Sri Lanka
Scoring by half: 61–16, 67–13

Talkatora Stadium, New Delhi

17 December
13:30

North Korea	77–48	Malaysia
Scoring by half: 42–25, 35–23

Talkatora Stadium, New Delhi

17 December
17:00

Japan	84–35	India
Scoring by half: 39–23, 45–12

Talkatora Stadium, New Delhi

18 December
10:45

Malaysia	65–42	Sri Lanka
Scoring by half: 34–20, 31–22

Talkatora Stadium, New Delhi

18 December
13:30

China	94–29	India
Scoring by half: 52–17, 42–12

Talkatora Stadium, New Delhi

18 December
17:00

North Korea	68–80	Japan
Scoring by half: 38–31, 30–49

Talkatora Stadium, New Delhi

19 December
9:00

Sri Lanka	36–132	North Korea
Scoring by half: 16–53, 20–79

Talkatora Stadium, New Delhi

19 December
13:30

Japan	74–79 (OT)	China
Scoring by half: 31–35, 40–36 Overtime: 3–8

Talkatora Stadium, New Delhi

19 December
15:15

India	46–66	Malaysia
Scoring by half: 21–36, 25–30

Talkatora Stadium, New Delhi

20 December
10:45

Japan	78–37	Malaysia
Scoring by half: 49–16, 29–21

Talkatora Stadium, New Delhi

20 December
13:30

India	94–59	Sri Lanka
Scoring by half: 49–25, 45–34

Talkatora Stadium, New Delhi

20 December
17:00

China	110–79	North Korea
Scoring by half: 57–47, 53–32

Talkatora Stadium, New Delhi

=== Group B ===
Team	Pld	W	L	PF	PA	PD	Pts
South Korea	4	4	0	387	210	+177	8
Chinese Taipei	4	3	1	337	222	+115	7
Thailand	4	2	2	233	254	−21	6
Uzbekistan	4	1	3	251	296	−45	5
Hong Kong	4	0	4	151	377	−226	4

16 December
14:00

South Korea	117–41	Hong Kong
Scoring by half: 48–15, 69–26

Talkatora Stadium, New Delhi

16 December
19:15

Uzbekistan	58–83	Chinese Taipei
Scoring by half: 32–44, 26–39

Talkatora Stadium, New Delhi

17 December
10:45

Chinese Taipei	71–51	Thailand
Scoring by half: 36–31, 35–20

Talkatora Stadium, New Delhi

17 December
15:15

South Korea	107–46	Uzbekistan
Scoring by half: 46–27, 61–19

Talkatora Stadium, New Delhi

18 December
9:00

Thailand	51–81	South Korea
Scoring by half: 30–39, 21–42

Talkatora Stadium, New Delhi

18 December
17:00

Uzbekistan	87–37	Hong Kong
Scoring by half: 45–14, 42–23

Talkatora Stadium, New Delhi

19 December
10:45

Hong Kong	31–111	Chinese Taipei
Scoring by half: 13–57, 18–54

Talkatora Stadium, New Delhi

19 December
17:00

Uzbekistan	60–69	Thailand
Scoring by half: 25–34, 35–35

Talkatora Stadium, New Delhi

20 December
9:00

Thailand	62–42	Hong Kong
Scoring by half: 36–19, 26–23

Talkatora Stadium, New Delhi

20 December
15:15

Chinese Taipei	72–82	South Korea
Scoring by half: 37–38, 35–44

Talkatora Stadium, New Delhi

== Classification 5th–10th ==
=== 9th place ===
21 December
9:00

India	73–40	Hong Kong
Scoring by half: 33–18, 40–22

Talkatora Stadium, New Delhi

=== 7th place ===
21 December
10:45

Malaysia	49–48	Uzbekistan
Scoring by half: 26–22, 23–26

Talkatora Stadium, New Delhi

=== 5th place ===
21 December
13:30

North Korea	78–42	Thailand
Scoring by half: 50–20, 28–22

Talkatora Stadium, New Delhi

== Final round ==
Semifinals
21 December
China	65
Chinese Taipei	35
21 December
Japan (OT)	68
South Korea	65

Final
22 December
China	78
Japan	59
3rd place
22 December
Chinese Taipei	64
South Korea	67

=== Semifinals ===
21 December
17:00

China	65–35	Chinese Taipei
Scoring by half: 38–18, 27–17

Talkatora Stadium, New Delhi

21 December
18:45

Japan	68–65 (OT)	South Korea
Scoring by half: 32–27, 25–30 Overtime: 11–8

Talkatora Stadium, New Delhi

=== 3rd place ===
22 December
13:30

Chinese Taipei	64–67	South Korea
Scoring by half: 31–25, 33–42

Talkatora Stadium, New Delhi

=== Final ===
22 December
15:15

China	78–59	Japan
Scoring by half: 44–35, 34–24

Talkatora Stadium, New Delhi

== Final standing ==
Qualified for the 2001 FIBA Under-19 World Championship for Women

Rank	Team	Record
1st place, gold medalist(s)	China	7–0
2nd place, silver medalist(s)	Japan	5–2
3rd place, bronze medalist(s)	South Korea	5–1
4	Chinese Taipei	3–3
5	North Korea	4–2
6	Thailand	2–3
7	Malaysia	3–3
8	Uzbekistan	1–4
9	India	2–4
10	Hong Kong	0–5
11	Sri Lanka	0–5

== Awards ==
2000 Asian Under-18 champions

China
Eighth title

- Most Valuable Player: (China) Chen Nan
