= 2015 National Games of India =

Multi-sport event in Kerala, India

35th National Games of India
- 2015 National Games logo
- Host city: Thiruvananthapuram, Kollam, Alappuzha, Kochi, Kozhikode, Thrissur, and Kannur
- Motto: Get Set Play
- Teams: 37
- Opening: 31 January 2015
- Closing: 14 February 2015
- Opened by: Venkaiah Naidu (Union Minister of Parliamentary Affairs)
- Closed by: Pranab Mukherjee (President of India)
- Athlete's Oath: Preeja Sreedharan
- Torch lighter: P. T. Usha and Anju Bobby George
- Main venue: Greenfield Stadium, Thiruvananthapuram

The 2015 National Games of India, also known as the 35th National Games of India and informally as Kerala 2015, was a national multi-sport event held from 31 January 2015 to 14 February 2015 across seven districts of Kerala, India. It was the second time that Kerala hosted the national games, the first being when it hosted the 27th National Games in 1987. An estimated total of 11,641 athletes from 37 teams participated in 405 events in 33 sports.

The opening ceremony took place at Greenfield Stadium, on 31 January 2015 at 6.00 PM. Union Minister of Urban Development, Shri Venkaiah Naidu inaugurated the opening ceremony.

Former cricketer Sachin Tendulkar was selected as the goodwill ambassador for the games.

== Mascot ==
Ammu, the great hornbill.

Ammu, the Great Hornbill (the state bird of Kerala) was chosen as the mascot, reflecting a concern for conservation as this is a species facing extinction. It is also an expression of the need to preserve Kerala's rain forests and regenerate the lost habitat of this precious bird. The choice of a feminine name for the mascot is a tribute to the women of Kerala.

== Games Village ==
The Games Village is constructed based on the concept of prefabricated housing technology. The prefabricated housing is a environmentally friendly, lightweight, energy efficient and faster to construct. One major advantage of this technology is that the individual housing units can be dismantled and relocated to other locations after the Games with additional cost in the form of steel Flashing /trims, civil foundation, internal electrification and plumbing, hardware, floor finish, wall cladding etc.

A total of 365 pre-fab houses occupying 5 athletes per room while team officials and coaches will be allocated single or double rooms. Social infrastructures such as kitchen, food courts, reception desks, medical centre, recreational zone, health club, open-air theatre, conference halls etc. are included in the Games Village. Apart from these, it also has house-keeping, solid waste management, security, clean water distribution facilities and even landscaping.

The Games Village is a ‘miniature India' as this venue is supposed to be a vocal and visual representation of India's national integration at the Games.

== Opening ceremony ==
The opening ceremony was held at Greenfield Stadium, Thiruvananthapuram. Union Minister for Urban Development, Venkaiah Naidu declared the Games open in the presence of Kerala Chief Minister, Oommen Chandy, State Sports Minister, Thiruvanchoor Radhakrishnan, Union Minister of State for Sports, Sarbananda Sonowal, IOA president N. Ramachandran and the local M.P., Shashi Tharoor. The games torch, a cauldron shaped like a traditional Kerala lamp, was lit by athletes P. T. Usha and Anju Bobby George, and was passed to them by Sachin Tendulkar. The oath was taken on the behalf of the participants by the Kerala captain, Preeja Sreedharan.

== Sports events ==
There are 33 sports disciplines in 2015 Kerala Games. Yachting is a newly included event. Aquatics (50 disciplines) and athletics (44 disciplines) were the biggest and most popular events in Kerala Games 2015; shooting (38 disciplines) became another big event.

Sports event	Number of medals
Aquatics	50
Athletics	44
Shooting	38
Canoeing	36
Wrestling	24
Cycling	20
Boxing	20
Gymnastics	20
Rowing	18
Archery	15
Weightlifting	15
Wushu	15
Judo	14
Fencing	12
Lawn Bowls	8
Badminton	7
Table Tennis	7
Tennis	6
Triathlon	4
Basketball	2
Beach Handball	2
Beach Volleyball	2
Football	2
Handball	2
Hockey	2
Kabbadi	2
Kho Kho	2
Netball	2
Squash	2
Volleyball	2
Taekwondo	1
Rugby Sevens	1
Yachting	1

== Venues ==
Venue	Sports	District
College of Agriculture, Vellayani Indoor Stadium	Taekwondo, Netball	Thiruvananthapuram
Chandrasekharan Nair Stadium (CSN)	Athletics	Thiruvananthapuram
Cherai Beach	Yachting	Ernakulam
CIAL Convention Center	Fencing	Ernakulam
CIAL Golf Course	Lawn Bowls	Ernakulam
EMS Stadium	Football	Kozhikode
Corporation Stadium, Thrissur	Football	Thrissur
Greenfield Stadium		Thiruvananthapuram
Indoor Stadium, Mundayad	Wrestling, Basketball	Kannur
Jawaharlal Nehru International Stadium	Archery	Ernakulam
Jimmy George Indoor Stadium	Handball, Gymnastics	Thiruvananthapuram
Kerala Police Academy	Shooting	Thiruvananthapuram
Kovalam Bypass	Triathlon	Thiruvananthapuram
Kozhikode Beach	Beach Volleyball	Kozhikode
Lal Bahadur Shastri Corporation Stadium	Rugby	Kollam
LNCPE Velodrome and Indoor Stadium	Cycling, Wushu	Thiruvananthapuram
Medical College Ground	Football	Kozhikode
New Hockey Stadium	Hockey	Kollam
New Tennis Complex	Tennis	Thiruvananthapuram
Pirappancode Aquatics Complex	Aquatics	Thiruvananthapuram
Rajiv Gandhi Indoor Stadium	Table Tennis, Badminton	Ernakulam
Shankumugham Beach	Beach Handball	Thiruvananthapuram
Shooting Range	Shooting	Thiruvananthapuram
Squash Court	Squash	Thiruvananthapuram
Sreepadam Stadium	Kho Kho, Kabadi	Thiruvananthapuram
Triprayar Indoor Stadium	Boxing	Thrissur
University Stadium	Athletics	Thiruvananthapuram
Vembanad lake	Rowing, Canoeing & Kayaking	Alappuzha
V.K.N. Menon Indoor Stadium	Volleyball	Thrissur
V.K.N. Menon Indoor Stadium	Weightlifting, Judo	Thrissur

== Results ==
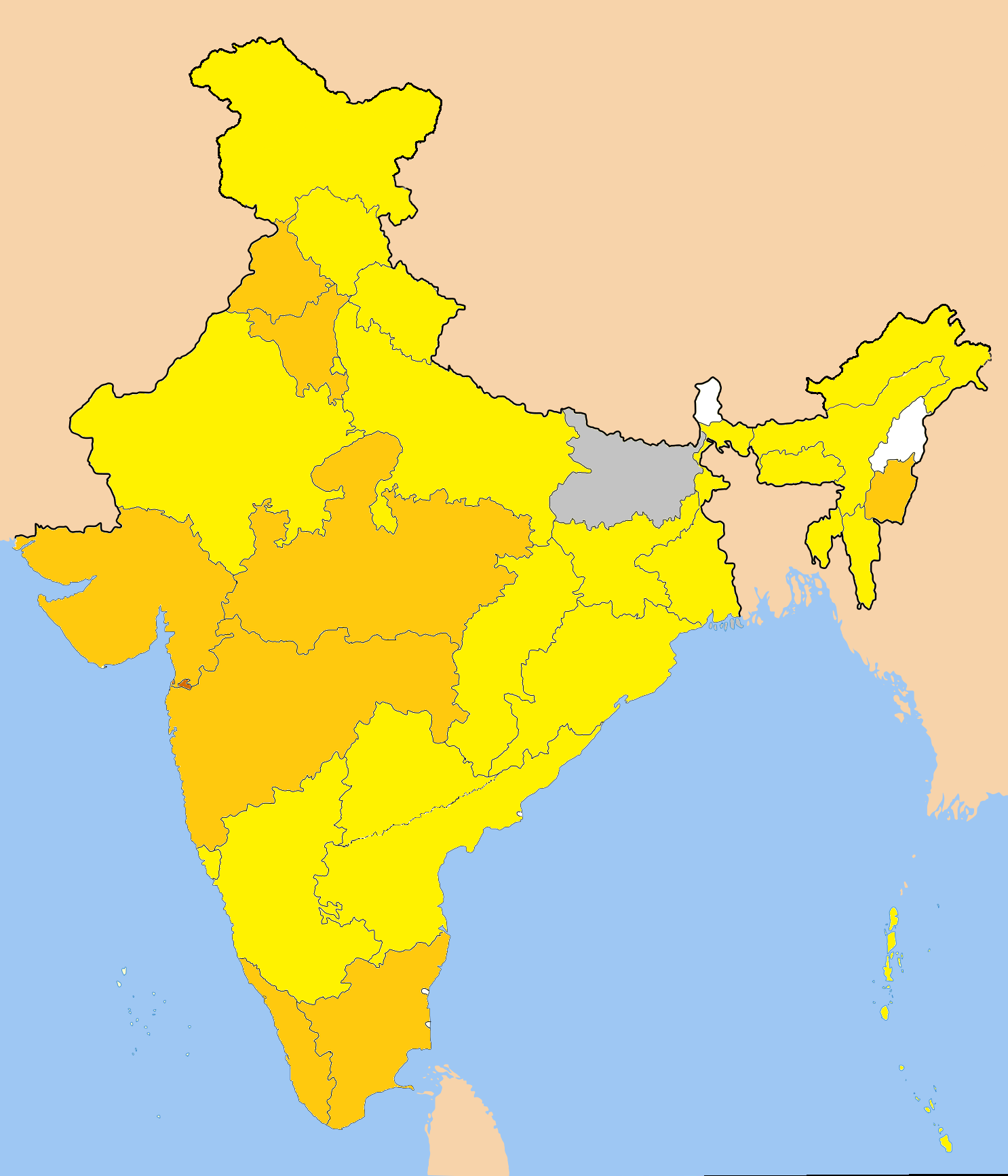
Won ten or more gold medals. Won between one and nine gold medals. Did not win a gold medal but won at least one silver medal. Did not win a gold or silver medal but won at least one bronze medal. Did not win a medal.

All of the states and union territories of India and the Indian Armed Forces' Services Sports Control Board (Services) participated in the event. Telangana made its debut at the National games after becoming a state and finished 11th with 33 medals overall. Athletes from every participating team (except Dadra and Nagar Haveli, Lakshadweep, Nagaland, Puducherry, and Sikkim) won medals. Among the medalling teams, thirty won at least one gold medal. Keralite swimmer Sajan Prakash won six gold medals and two silver medals, making him the most successful athlete of the event. Andaman and Nicobar Islands' Rajina Kiro, Madhya Pradesh's Inaocha Devi Mayanglambam, and Maharashtra's Aakanksha Vora won five gold medals and one silver medal, becoming the most decorated female athletes at these Games. Prakash broke the national record in 400 meters freestyle and 200 meters butterfly. Kerala's Tintu Luka broke the eighteen years old national record in 800 metres. Services' swimmer Madhu PS set a new national record in the 100 and 200 meters backstroke, and won four gold medals.

A total of 1334 medals (405 gold, 406 silver and 523 bronze) were awarded. Athletics, swimming, shooting, canoeing and kayaking, wrestling, cycling, and gymnastics accounted for almost half of the total medals awarded. The Services topped the medal table for a consecutive third time, having collected 91 gold medals. The host state, Kerala, secured the second position with 54 gold medals; it also secured the most silver medals (48), the most bronze medals (60), and the most medals overall (162). Haryana athletes claimed 107 medals in total (including 40 gold), earning third spot on the table.

=== Top 10 medal winners ===
Rank	Sport	Athlete	State	Gold	Silver	Bronze	Total
1	Swimming	Sajan Prakash	Kerala	6	2	0	8
2	Canoeing & Kayaking	Rajina Kiro	Andaman and Nicobar Islands	5	1	0	6
3	Canoeing & Kayaking		Madhya Pradesh	5	1	0	6
4	Swimming	Aakanksha Vora	Maharashtra	5	1	0	6
5	Shooting	Vijay Kumar	Services	5	0	1	6
6	Shooting	Gurpreet Singh	Services	5	0	0	5
7	Gymnastics	Dipa Karmakar	Tripura	5	0	0	5
8	Swimming	Richa Mishra	Madhya Pradesh	4	1	2	7
9	Shooting	Chain Singh Manhas	Services	4	1	1	6
10	Swimming	Aditi Dhumatkar	Maharashtra	4	1	0	5

=== Medals tally ===
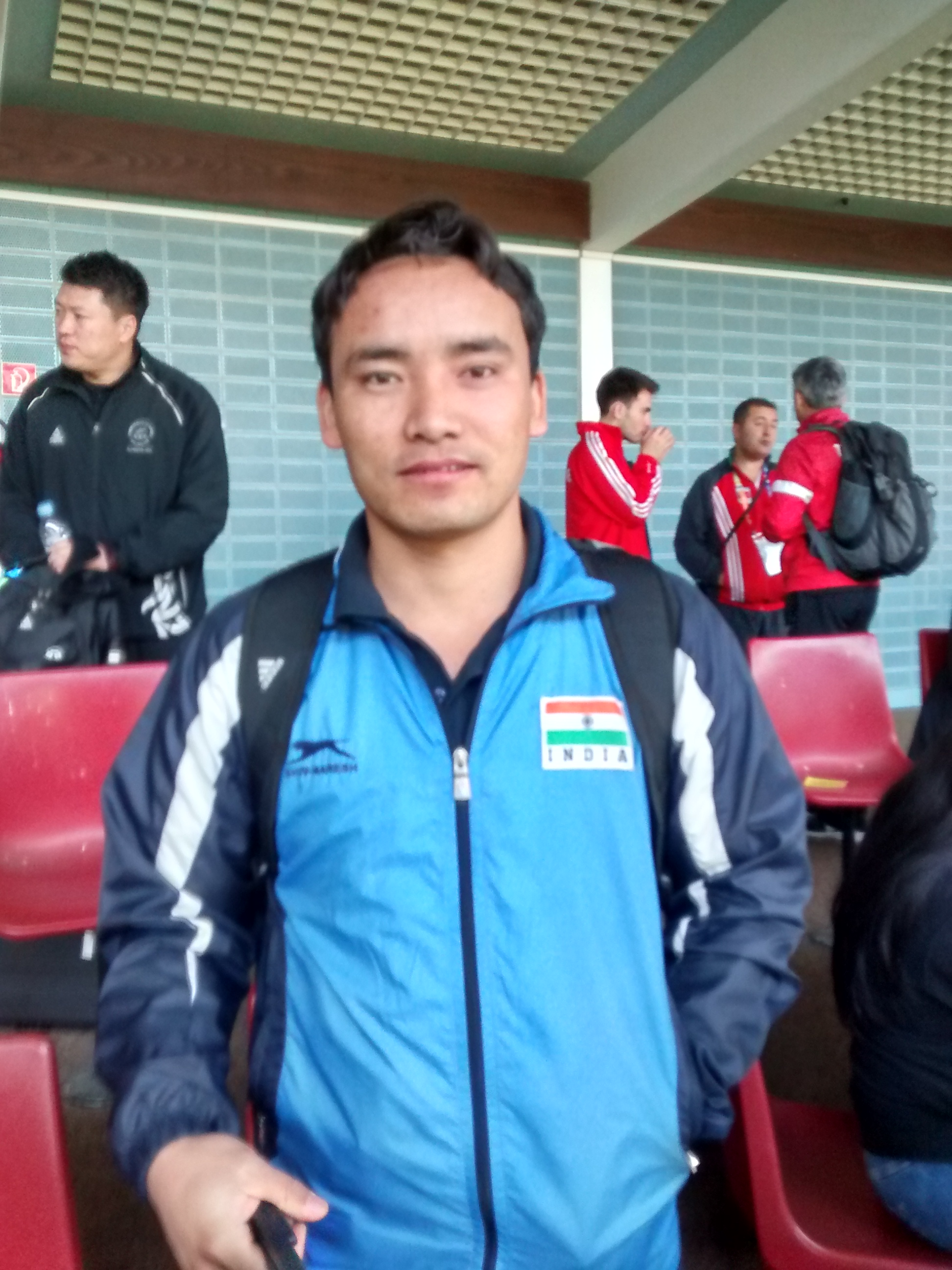
Services' Jitu Rai won three gold and one bronze medal in shooting.

The ranking in this table is consistent with Indian Olympic Association convention in its published medal tables. By default, the table is ordered by the number of gold medals the athletes from a team have won. The number of silver medals is taken into consideration next, followed by the number of bronze medals. If nations are still tied, equal ranking is given; they are listed alphabetically.

The total number of bronze medals is greater than the total number of gold or silver medals because two bronze medals were awarded per event in twelve sports: badminton, boxing, fencing, judo, kabaddi, kho-kho, lawn bowls, squash, table tennis, taekwondo, tennis, wrestling and wushu (in seven events out of fifteen). In the women's high jump event of athletics, a tie for the second position between two athletes from West Bengal and Madhya Pradesh meant that two silver medals (and no bronze) were awarded.

* Host nation (Host state)

Rank	State	Gold	Silver	Bronze	Total
1	Services	91	33	35	159
2	Kerala*	54	48	60	162
3	Haryana	40	40	27	107
4	Maharashtra	30	43	50	123
5	Punjab	27	34	32	93
6	Madhya Pradesh	23	27	41	91
7	Manipur	22	21	26	69
8	Tamil Nadu	16	16	20	52
9	Gujarat	10	4	6	20
10	Assam	9	5	11	25
11	Karnataka	8	21	24	53
12	Telangana	8	14	11	33
13	Jharkhand	8	3	12	23
14	Uttar Pradesh	7	31	30	68
15	West Bengal	6	12	30	48
16	Odisha	6	5	4	15
17	Andaman and Nicobar Islands	6	4	3	13
18	Andhra Pradesh	6	3	7	16
19	Delhi	5	12	29	46
20	Rajasthan	5	6	7	18
21	Tripura	5	0	0	5
22	Jammu and Kashmir	3	2	10	15
23	Uttarakhand	2	5	12	19
24	Goa	1	3	7	11
25	Chandigarh	1	2	13	16
25	Chhattisgarh	1	2	13	16
27	Mizoram	1	2	3	6
28	Arunachal Pradesh	1	2	1	4
29	Himachal Pradesh	1	1	1	3
29	Meghalaya	1	1	1	3
31	Bihar	0	2	5	7
32	Daman and Diu	0	0	1	1
Totals (32 entries)		404	404	532	1,340

== Greening the National Games ==
The 2015 National Games was associated with green protocols. This was initiated by Suchitwa Mission, aiming for "zero-waste" venues. Waste Management programmes were implemented at all 29 venues. To make the event "disposable-free", a ban on the use of disposable water bottles was enforced. The event witnessed the usage of reusable tableware and stainless steel tumblers. Athletes were provided with refillable steel flasks. It is estimated that these green practices prevented the generation of about 120 metric tonnes of disposable waste. Suchitwa Mission requested the help of volunteers to achieve the green objectives, and the service of these 700 volunteers to achieve the green objectives were applauded by the Chief Minister.

Preceded by 2011 National Games of India	National Games of India	Succeeded by ~~2020 National Games of India~~
