= Campal Indoor Complex =

Multi-purpose stadium in Goa, India

- Interactive map of Campal Indoor Complex
- Former names: Multipurpose Indoor Stadium
- Location: Campal, Goa, India
- Coordinates: 15°29′21″N 73°48′41″E
- Owner: Sports Authority of Goa
- Operator: Sports Authority of Goa
- Capacity: 4,000
- Surface: Maple flooring

Construction
- Opened: 2014
- Cost: ₹82 crore

Tenant
- 2020 National Games of India

Campal Indoor Complex is a multi-purposed indoor stadium in Campal, Goa, India. The stadium is a main stadium in the town of Campal. The stadium was constructed for the 36 National Games for events of volleyball and basketball. It has various sports facilities like physical training for boys and ladies, indoor games, swimming pools, outdoor games etc. The stadium is a home of Sports Authority of Goa.

Facilities includes air conditioning, player change rooms and lounge, dope control and medical rooms, media centre, state-of-the-art-acoustics and parking facilities and maple wood flooring at playing field. The stadium can also be used for many non sporting events and it can accommodate any indoor sporting event played at the Olympics.

The stadium will be host of boxing, table tennis, wrestling for 2020 National Games of India.
