= Campal =

Neighborhood in Panjim City, Goa, India

Campal is a neighborhood located in the northern part of the city of Panaji, the capital of the Indian state of Goa. It is completely located on the island of Tiswadi, one of the talukas in the state of Goa.

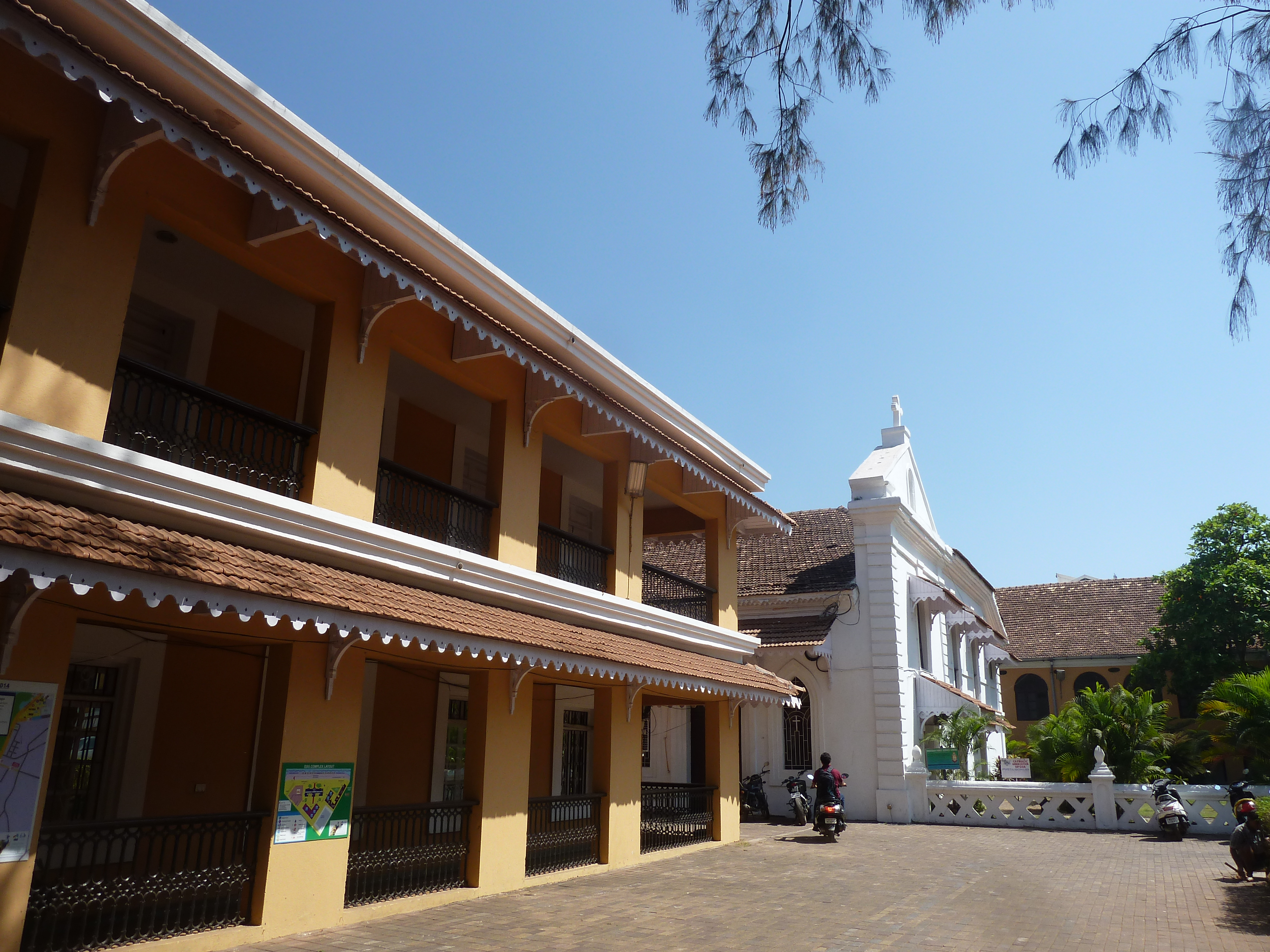
Maquinez Palace at Campal

The neighborhoods name derives from "Campal de Dom Manuel", after Dom Manuel de Portugal e Castro, who developed it as a commercial area in 1830.

== Local landmarks ==
On the left side of the road into Campal there is a large four-metre cannon. Slightly further is a garden containing a statue erected in 1929 of Francisco Luis Gomes, a representative in the Cortes, in Lisbon.

Campal also houses the Kala Academy, a cultural centre with indoor and outdoor auditoriums, which hosted the International Film Festival of India in 2004, as well as a gymkhana surrounded by a large playground with various sports facilities.

Campal Indoor Complex is a multi-purpose indoor stadium, the home of the Sports Authority of Goa.

The INOX four-screen multiplex theater, the Goa Directorate of Health Services, and the Goa College of Architecture are also located in Campal. Various trade fairs and exhibitions also are often held at the Campal grounds.
