= Talkatora Gardens =

Park in New Delh, India

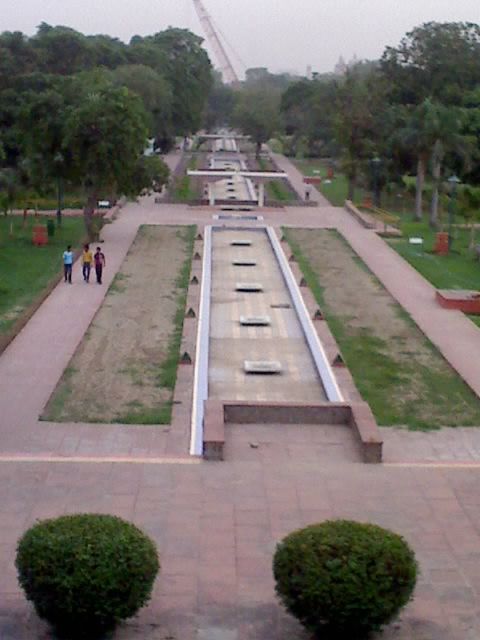
- Talkatora Gardens

- Location within Delhi
- Interactive map of Talkatora Gardens
- Coordinates: 28°37′27″N 77°11′36″E

Talkatora Garden is a Mughal-era garden situated on the Mother Teresa Crescent (previously Willingdon Crescent) in Delhi. During the Mughal era, it used to be a tank and a swimming pool. The Maratha raid on Delhi occurred on 28 March 1737, when the Marathas, led by Bajirao, targeted the Mughals near Talkatora, close to Delhi. Bajirao sought to avenge the Marathas' prior defeat at the Battle of Jalesar by Saadat Ali Khan. The garden lends name to the eponymous Talkatora Stadium bordering its edges.

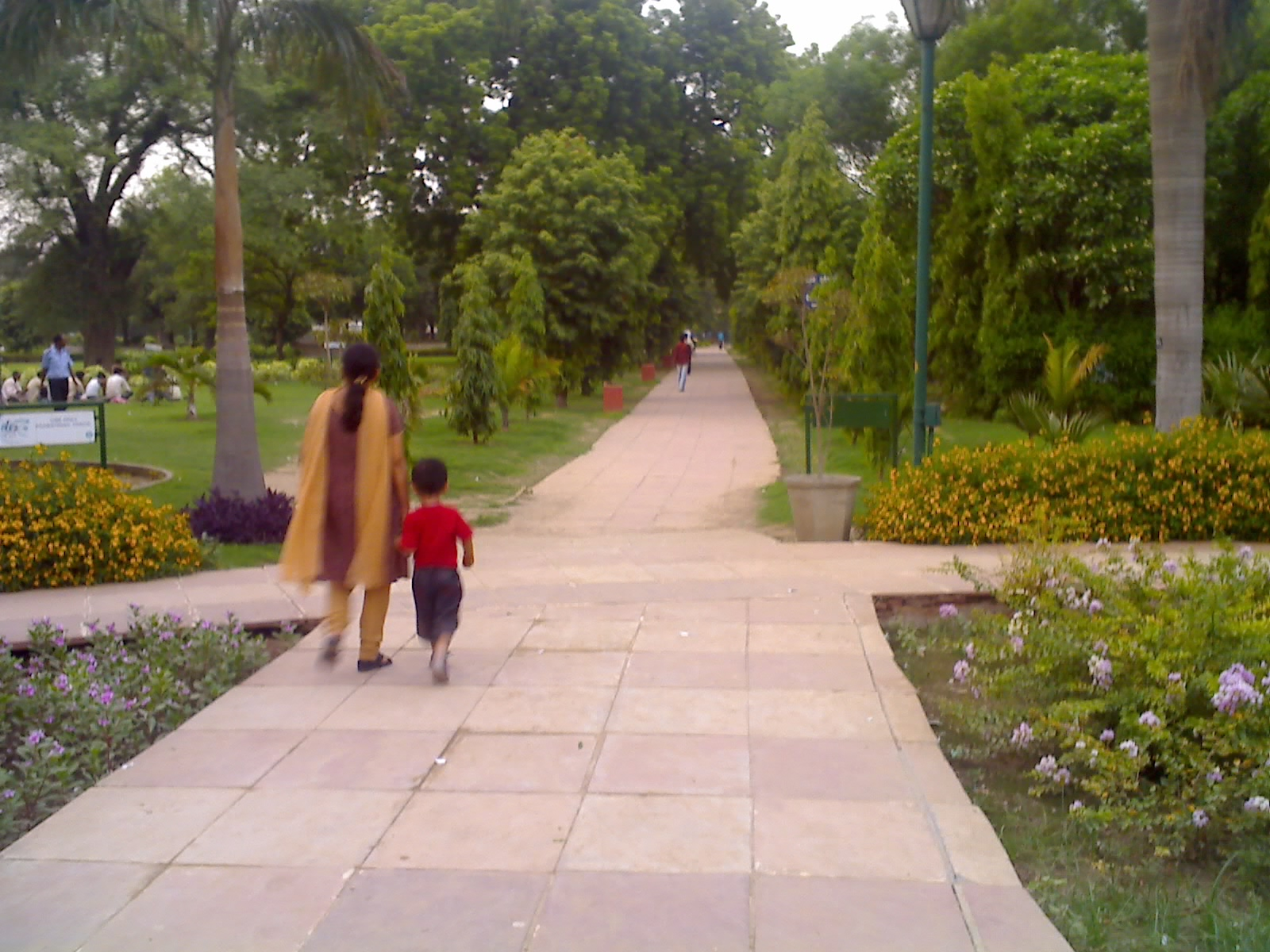
Talkatora Gardens

== Etymology ==
The nearby Talkatora Stadium is also named after the garden. A tal (water tank) located in the western part of the garden is surrounded by hilly terrain, part of the Delhi Ridge, creating a bowl-shaped natural depression, or katora. This unique landscape feature is the origin of the place's name, Talkatora. Footfalls burgeon steadily with the onset of the spring season.The garden not only features a diverse array of flowers but also houses an eponymous stadium where various games and events are held.

== History ==
On the west side of the garden, there once existed a tal (water tank) surrounded by hilly terrain that formed a katora (a bowl-shaped natural depression). Although the tank has long since disappeared, a long wall with domed octagonal pavilions at each end still stands at the garden's northwestern edge. This structure served as an embankment (bund) to contain rainwater flowing into the tank. In 1736–37, the surrounding area was used as a camping ground by the Maratha Army.

== See also ==
- List of parks in Delhi
