= Triprayar Sports and Games Association Indoor Stadium =

Indoor stadium in Triprayar, India

Captain Hawa Singh Plaza
- TSGA Indoor Stadium
- Former names: Triprayar Sports & Games Association Stasium
- Location: Triprayar, Thrissur District, Kerala
- Owner: Triprayar Sports & Games Association
- Operator: Triprayar Sports & Games Association
- Capacity: 4,000

Construction
- Groundbreaking: 2010
- Built: 2013
- Opened: 20 April 2013
- Renovated: 2014
- Cost: ₹1.08 crore

Tenant
- 2015 National Games of India

Captain Hawa Singh Plaza aka Triprayar Sports and Games Association Indoor Stadium is the first of its kind rural Indoor stadium in India, located in Triprayar in Thrissur District, Kerala. The stadium is registered under Charitable Trust Act by Triprayar Sports & Games Association who owns the stadium. 2013 National Games of India Boxing event will be held in this stadium.
