= Abhay Prashal Indoor Stadium =

Indoor arena in Indore, India

- Interactive map of Abhay Prashal Indoor Stadium
- Full name: Abhay Prashal Indoor Stadium
- Former names: Khel Prashal Stadium
- Location: Indore, Madhya Pradesh
- Coordinates: 22.724993°N 75.877749°E
- Capacity: 10,000

Construction
- Groundbreaking: 1994
- Opened: 1994

Website
- Official website

Abhay Prashal Indoor Stadium is an indoor stadium located in Indore, Madhya Pradesh, in India. The stadium was constructed on 3.5 acres of land allotted by the Government of Madhya Pradesh for events of table tennis. The stadium has a seating capacity of 10,000 and was inaugurated by Arjun Singh the then Chief Minister of Madhya Pradesh in December 1994. The venue hosts several political events, music events and sports events such as badminton, basketball, and table tennis.

In 2012, Abhay Prashal was chosen as ITTF Hot Spots table tennis Training Centre in India and only centre in the South Asian Region.
