= G. M. C. Balayogi Indoor Stadium =

Multipurpose outdoor/indoor stadium in Hyderabad, India

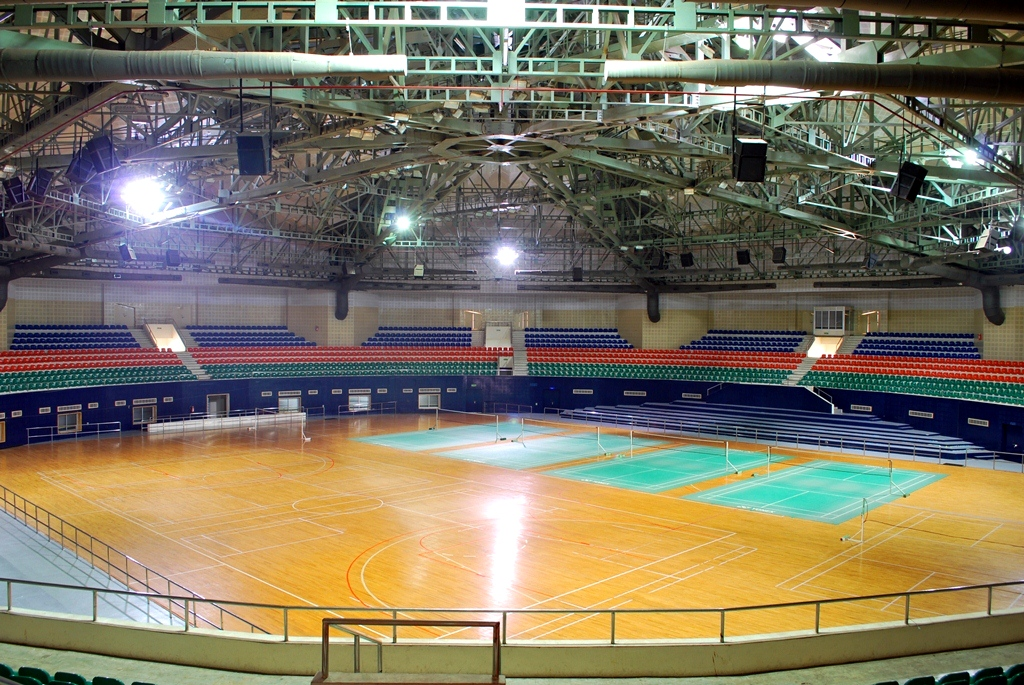
- Interactive map of G. M. C. Balayogi Indoor Stadium
- Former names: Gachibowli Indoor Stadium
- Location: Gachibowli, Hyderabad, Telangana, India
- Coordinates: 17°26′53.38″N 78°20′42.62″E
- Owner: Sports Authority of Telangana
- Capacity: 3,576
- Field size: 60 m radius

Construction
- Built: 2002
- Architect: STUP Consultants
- General contractor: Nagarjuna Construction Company Ltd

Tenant
- Telugu Titans

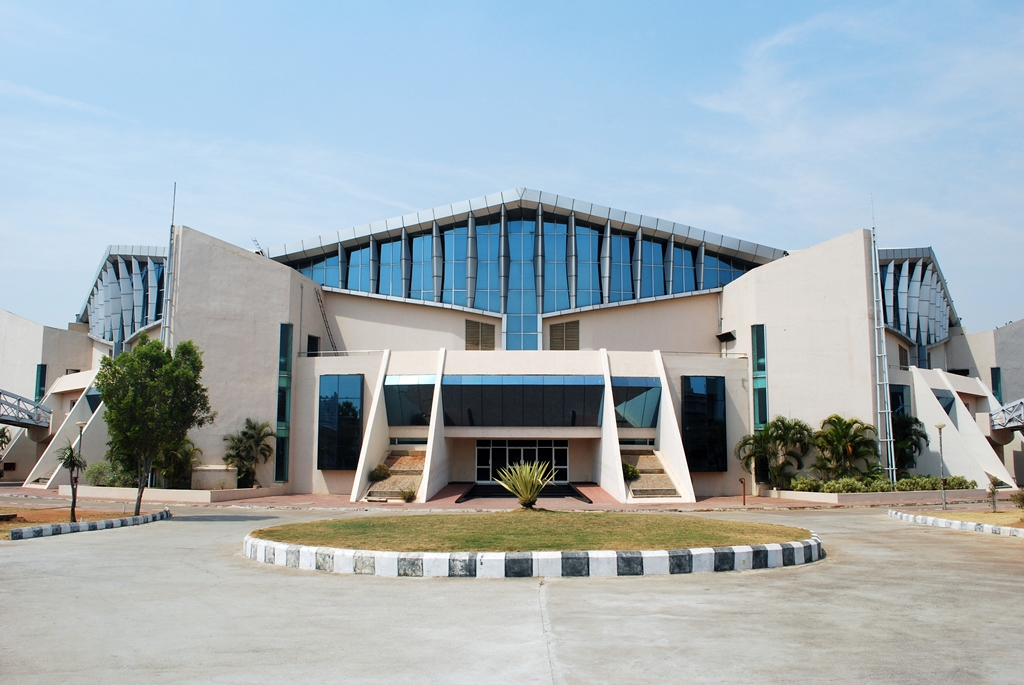
Gachibowli Indoor Stadium

G. M. C. Balayogi Indoor Stadium is an indoor arena located in Hyderabad, India. It holds 5,000 people. It is located in the Gachibowli suburb. The stadium was built in 2002 headed by N. Chandrababu Naidu Government to host the 2003 Afro-Asian games. The indoor stadium is located beside the Hyderabad International Institute of Information Technology, near the general area of G.M.C Balayogi Athletic Stadium.

== Notable Events ==
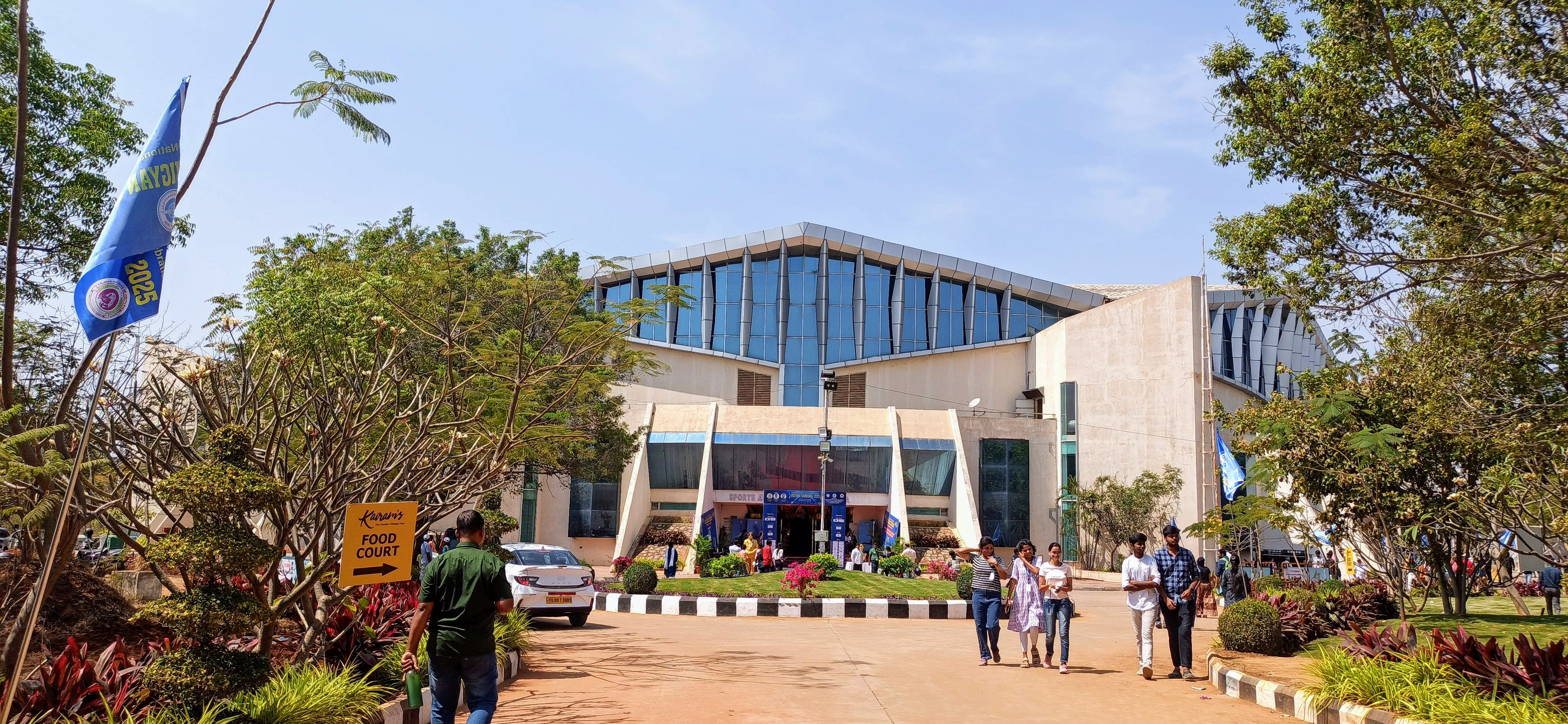
Gachibowli Indoor Stadium Hyderabad Telangana India[[File:Gachibowli Indoor Stadium Hyderabad Telangana India 4.jpg|thumb|Gachibowli Indoor Stadium Hyderabad Telangana India]] [[File:Gachibowli Indoor Stadium Hyderabad Telangana India.jpg|thumb|Gachibowli Indoor Stadium Hyderabad Telangana India]]

The stadium has hosted or currently hosts the following notable events.

- Pro Kabaddi League (2015 - Present, home of Telugu Titans)
- 2017 TEDxHyderabad (3rd edition)
- UBA Pro Basketball League (Season 1 and 2)
- 2009 BWF World Championships
- 2003 Afro-Asian Games
- WWE Superstar Spectacle live event on 8th September 2023

== Central arena ==
The central playing arena measures 60 metres by 40 metres in size and consists of a basketball court and six badminton courts. The indoor stadium can also host other sporting events such as kabaddi, taekwondo, table tennis, boxing, judo, wrestling and weight lifting.

== Pedestrian bridge ==
The design of the indoor stadium involves segregation of spectators' access from the access of sports-persons and officials. Four large pedestrian bridges placed at the four cardinal points allow access to the spectators directly to the stands at the up-per level. A combination of ramps and staircases lead the spectator to a height of 3m from ground level, from where a 4m wide steel-truss bridge of 12m span leads the spectators to a circumferential corridor from where they enter into the stands.

== See also ==
- G. M. C. Balayogi Athletic Stadium
- List of stadiums in Hyderabad, India
- 2002 National Games of India
- 2003 Afro-Asian Games
