= Deccan Derby =

- Location: Hyderabad Race Club
- Date: 2 October

Deccan Derby is an Indian Thoroughbred horse race held every year at the Hyderabad Race Club, Hyderabad, India.

== The Race ==
The annual event, Deccan Derby is held here which attracts the best 3 year olds in the country and is always run on October 2.
