= Dr. Shyama Prasad Mukherjee Indoor Stadium =

Sports facility at Goa University, Goa, India

Coordinates: 15.4579062°N 73.8410878°E

Dr Shyama Prasad Mukherjee Indoor Stadium
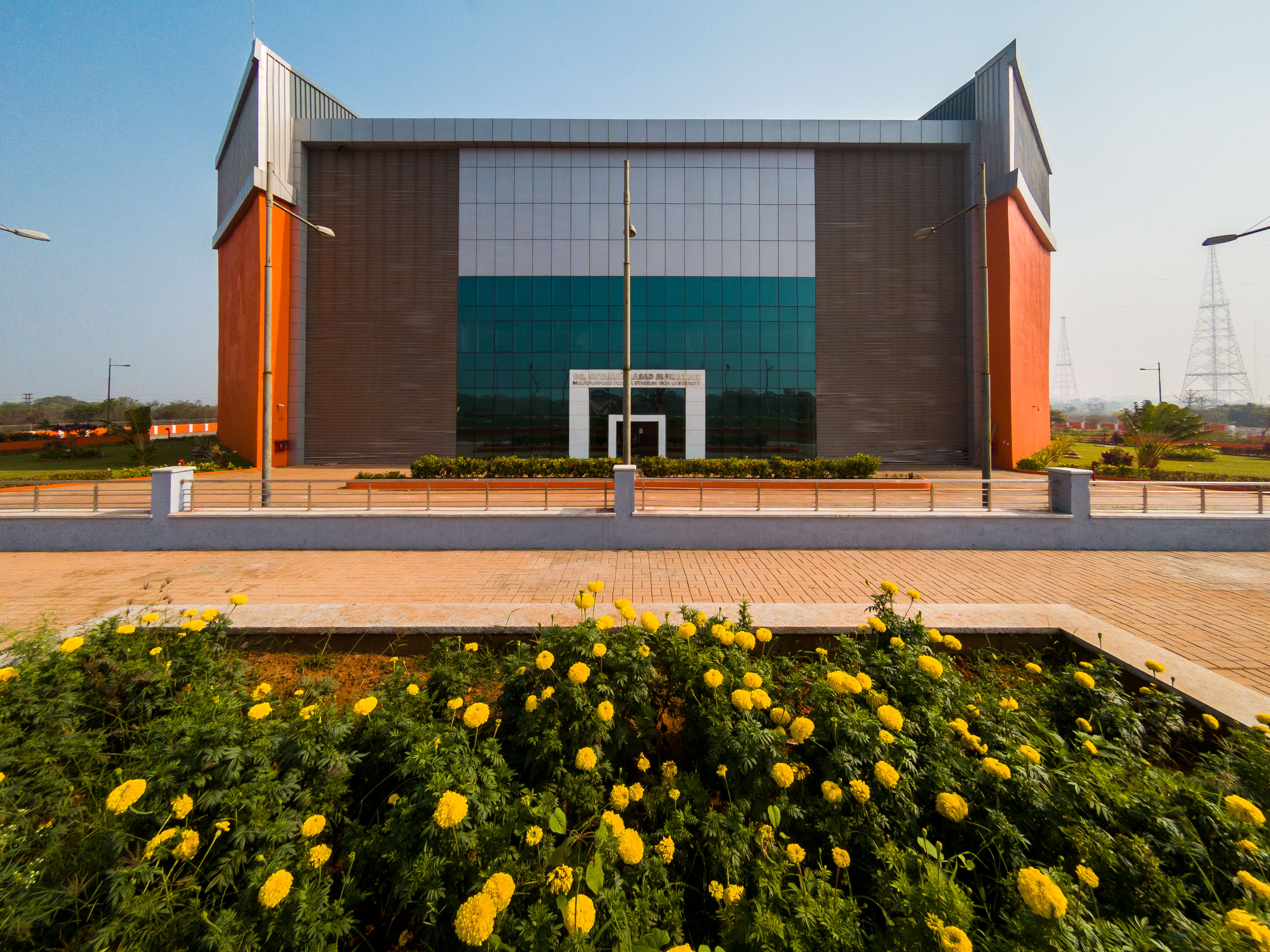
- The stadium in 2018
- Interactive map of Dr Shyama Prasad Mukherjee Indoor Stadium
- Former names: Multipurpose Indoor Stadium
- Location: Goa University, Taleigao, Goa, India
- Owner: Sports Authority of Goa
- Operator: Sports Authority of Goa
- Capacity: 4,000
- Surface: Maple flooring

Construction
- Opened: 2014
- Cost: ₹ 82 crore

Tenant
- 2014 Lusophony Games

Dr Shyama Prasad Mukherjee Indoor Stadium is an indoor stadium located on the campus of Goa University at Taleigao, Goa, India.

The stadium was constructed for the 2014 Lusophony Games for events of volleyball and basketball. The stadium is named after Dr Shyama Prasad Mukherjee former Indian politician and the founder of Bhartiya Jana Sangh.

The stadium has a seating capacity of 4000 and was inaugurated by Governor of Goa Bharat Vir Wanchoo in 2014.

It cost ₹82 crore and was built in 11 months which is a record for the construction of an indoor stadium of international standard. With a 131-metre sheet, the stadium is Asia's first stadium which has the longest single-sheet roof.

Facilities includes air conditioning, player change rooms and lounge, dope control and medical rooms, media centre, state-of-the-art-acoustics and parking facilities and maple wood flooring at playing field. The stadium can also be used for many non sporting events and it can accommodate any indoor sporting event played at the Olympics. Facilities include HD compliant arena lighting, Broadcast room, TV Studio, Player Dressing rooms, Match Delegates area, Dope control rooms, Medical rooms for players and spectators, VIP Lounge, Media Tribune and Media working stations, Press Conference area, Mixed zone area, CCTV camera and parking facilities.
