= Saroornagar Indoor Arena =

Indoor sporting arena in Hyderabad, India

Coordinates: 17°21′15″N 78°32′38″E

- Interactive map of Saroornagar Indoor Arena
- Location: Hyderabad
- Capacity: 2,000

Construction
- Opened: 2003
- Cost: ₹8.7

Saroornagar Indoor Stadium is an indoor sporting arena located in Hyderabad, India. The capacity of the arena is 2,000 people. And it has even got a wide number of sports being taught all along the year and many national and international players have emerged from that stadium. This is constructed in year 2002 for Afro-Asian games with cost of 8.7 Core.

The Telangana Premier Kabaddi began playing in 2018.
