= Hyderabad Race Club =

Thoroughbred racing association and track in India

Coordinates: 17°22′48″N 78°30′28″E

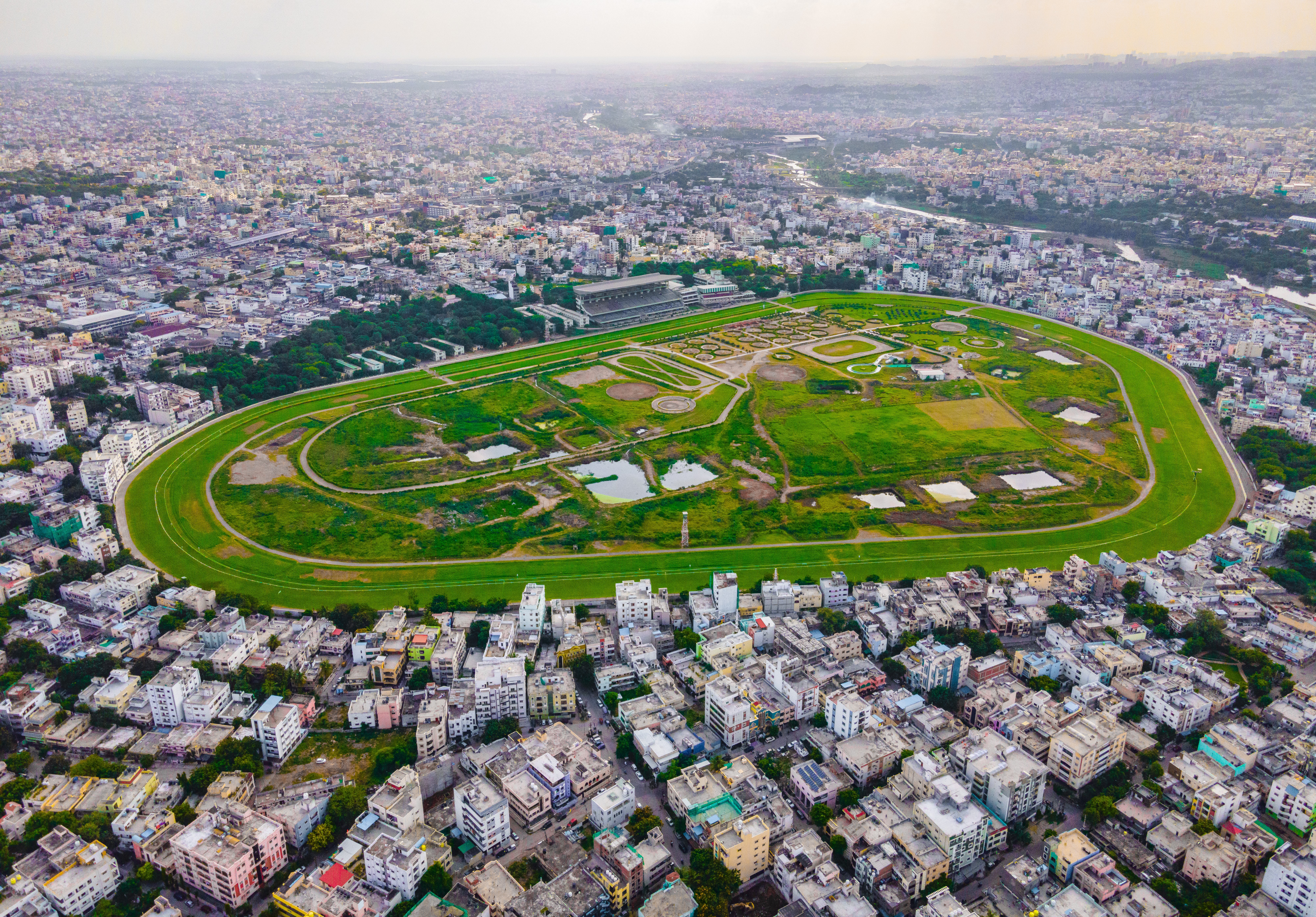
- Aerial View of the Hyderabad Race Club
- Interactive map of Hyderabad Race Club
- Location: Malakpet, Hyderabad, Telangana
- Owned by: Hyderabad Race Club
- Date opened: 1868
- Course type: Flat
- Notable races: Deccan Derby; President of India Gold Cup; Nizam's Gold Cup

The Hyderabad Race Club is a thoroughbred racing association and the race track is at Malakpet, Hyderabad, Telangana, India. This race course is considered one of the top racecourses in India and was inaugurated by the 6th Nizam Mahbub Ali Khan.

== History ==
Horse racing in Hyderabad was started by the Nizam Asaf Jah VI in 1868 at Moula-Ali. In those days the races were called Deccan races and later the Hyderabad races. In 1886 the racing shifted to Malakpet by H.H Nawab Mir Mahboob Ali Khan, Nizam VI as he wanted the race course to be near his palace. Hyderabad Race Club started its operations in 1961 in Secunderabad and shifted to Malakpet in 1968 when the racing was revived under Hyderabad Race Club.

== Deccan Derby ==
An annual event, Deccan Derby is held here which attracts the best 3 year olds in the country and is always run on 2 October.

== Other races ==
The other prestigious races are the President of India Gold Cup and the Nizam's Gold Cup, the Fillies Championship Stakes, the Colts Championship Stakes, which are run during the Monsoon Racing Season. Racing will be conducted from July to October called as Monsoon races and from November to February called Winter races.

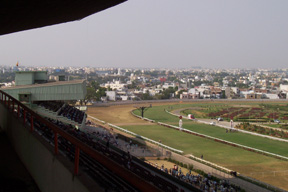
Racecourse view from main grandstand

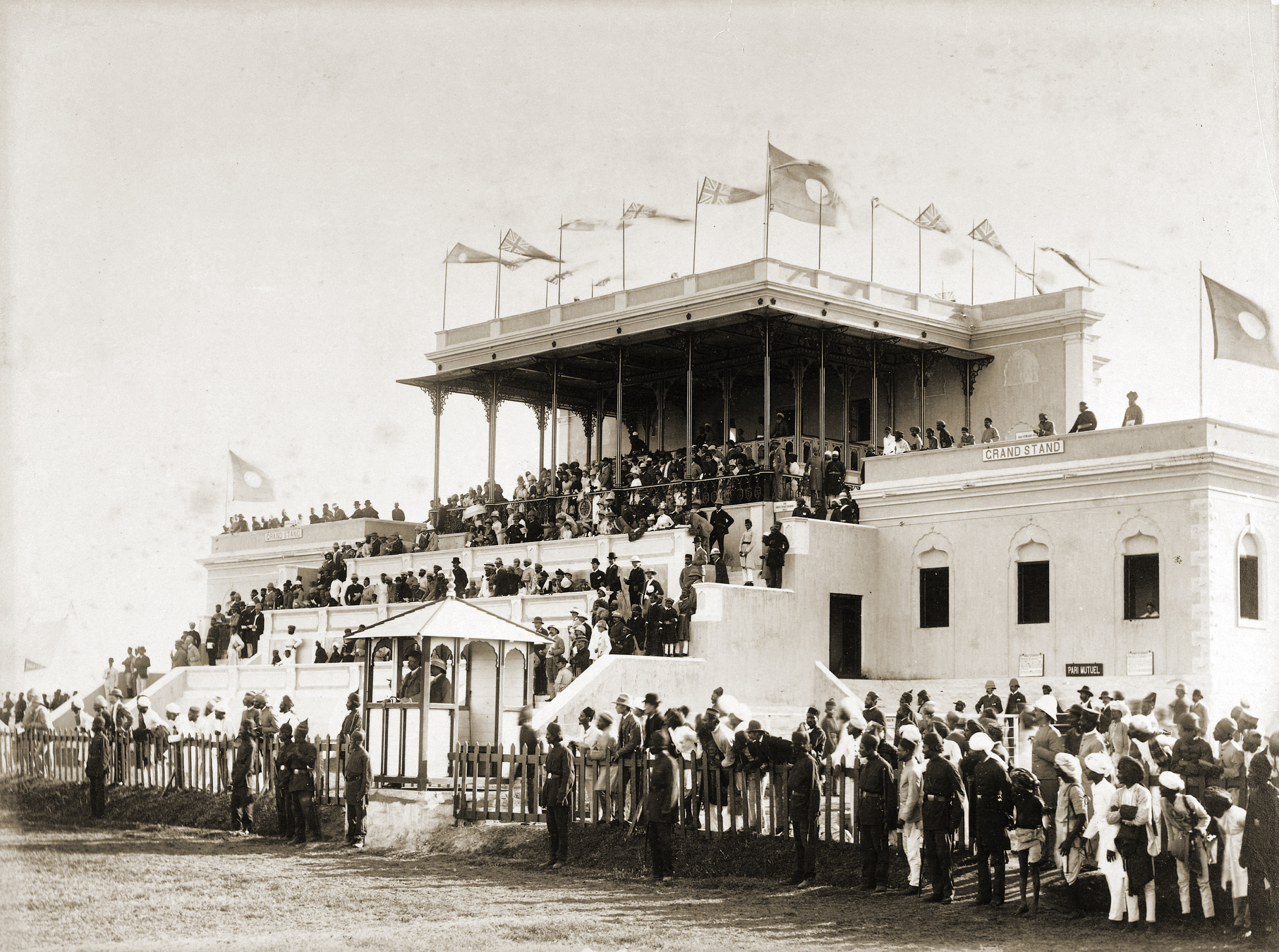
Grand Stand, Hyderabad Race Club. Photographed by Lala Deen Dayal in the 1880s.

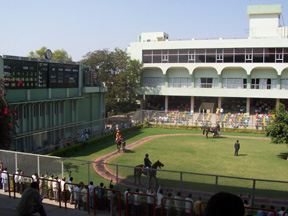
Mounting enclosure at Hyderabad Race Club

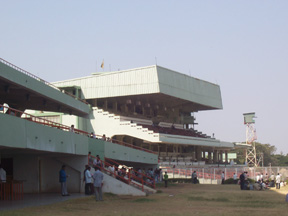
Jockey Club Grandstand at Hyderabad Race Club
