= DDA Netaji Subhash Sports Complex =

Sports venue in New Delhi, India

- Location: Jasola Vihar, New Delhi
- Owner: Delhi Development Authority
- Capacity: n/a
- Opened: 2000

The DDA Netaji Subhash Sports Complex is a sports complex located in Jasola Vihar, New Delhi. Sports complex was inaugurated in 2000.

The sports complex has facilities to host matches of tennis, badminton, table tennis, basketball, skating, jogging track, cricket, football, swimming pool, squash and gym. It is owned by the Delhi Development Authority. It was a venue for the 2010 Commonwealth Games.

The complex is used for the preliminary round matches of DSA Senior Division.

== Feature ==
The total area of the plot is 8.31 hectares of land. It has wooden flooring in match courts and show courts.

- Jogging tracks
- Badminton Hard Court into Synthetic
- Synthetic basketball courts
- Stage Flooring for TT Hall
- Two Squash Courts with maple wood flooring
- Children parks
- Gym with latest state of art equipments

== See also ==
- 2010 Commonwealth Games
- Jawaharlal Nehru Stadium, Delhi
