= Talkatora Indoor Stadium =

Indoor stadium located in New Delhi, India

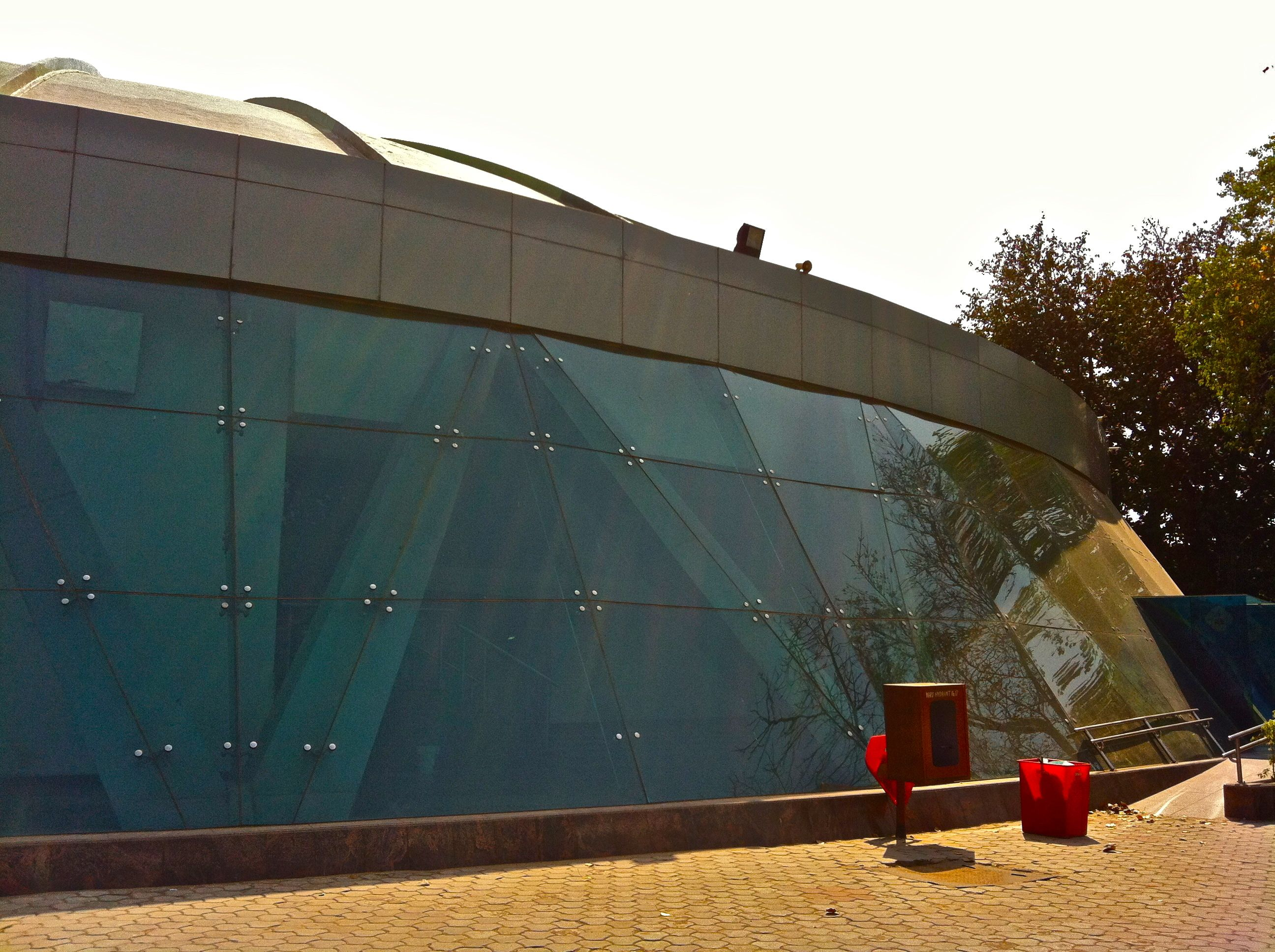
- Interactive map of Talkatora Indoor Stadium
- Location: (India) New Delhi
- Coordinates: 28°37′20.84″N 77°11′34.53″E
- Capacity: 3035

Talkatora Indoor Stadium (Hindi: तालकटोरा स्टेडियम) is an indoor stadium located in New Delhi, India. The stadium has a capacity of 3035 people. The stadium is owned and managed by the New Delhi Municipal Council (NDMC). The stadium complex also includes the Talkatora Swimming Pool (SPM Swimming Pool Complex) in a separate building.

== History ==
It is named after a Mughal-era garden, known as Talkatora Gardens. A tal (tank) situated at the west side of the garden, is surrounded by hilly ground (part of the Delhi ridge, forms a katora, bowl-shaped natural depression), which gives the place its name.

Upgraded Talkatora Indoor Stadium was inaugurated on 25 February 2010. The stadium is a unique piece of architecture with an elegant look. The stadium was a venue for the 2010 Commonwealth Games for the event of boxing. There was a star night to raise funds for the Kargil War relief fund. During November 1978, Leftists organized a national delegate session here which was attended by more than 7,000 trade union delegates.

== Overview ==
The stadium has one competition ring and four warm-up areas. The stadium has a tunnel to facilitate movement of the athletes from the Facility Block to the main stadium. The stadium has been connected to a tunnel which is used by the athletes, it has multiple facilities which include acoustic ceiling of dome, scoreboard, video screens and sports lighting. A number of environment-friendly material and energy-efficient devices have been used in this block to make it a green building.

Adjacent to the main stadium is the "glitzy" Talkatora Swimming Pool building.

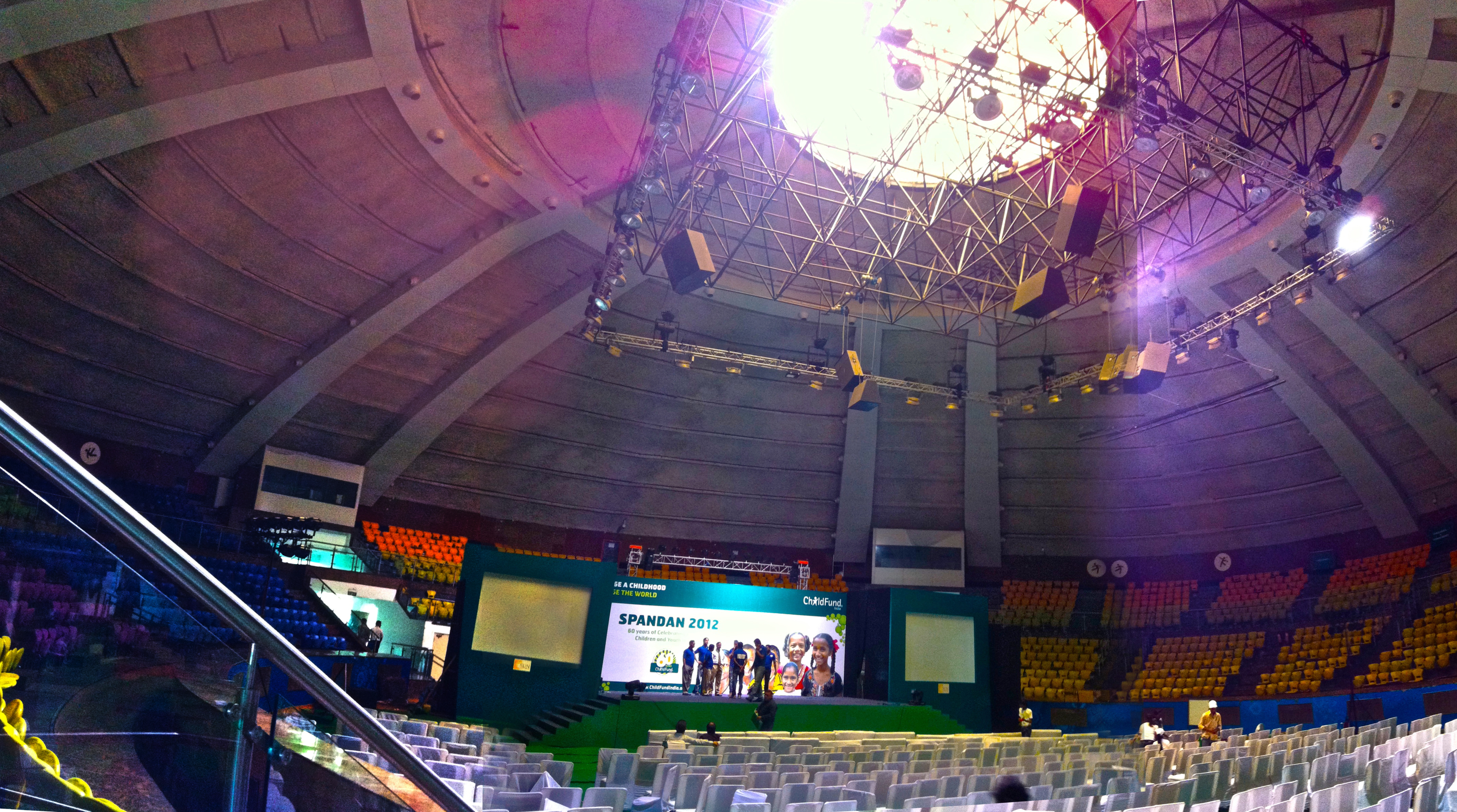
Inner side of Talkatora stadium

== See also ==
- 2010 Commonwealth Games
- Talkatora Swimming Pool
- Jawaharlal Nehru Stadium, Delhi
