= G. M. C. Balayogi Athletic Stadium =

Athletic stadium in India

Ganti Mohana Chandra Balayogi Athletic Stadium
- Gachibowli Stadium
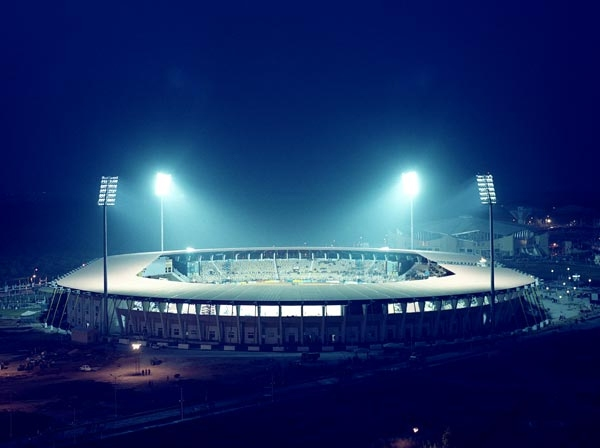
- The interior of the G. M. C. Balayogi Athletic Stadium
- Interactive map of Ganti Mohana Chandra Balayogi Athletic Stadium
- Full name: Ganti Mohana Chandra Balayogi Athletic Stadium
- Location: Gachibowli, Telangana, India
- Coordinates: 17°26′48.42″N 78°20′40.91″E
- Owner: Sports Authority of Telangana
- Capacity: 18,000
- Surface: Grass
- Scoreboard: Yes
- Field size: 105 m × 68 m (344 ft × 223 ft)

Construction
- Built: 2001
- Opened: 2003
- Renovated: 2024
- Cost: ₹35.30 crore

Tenants
- Sreenidi Deccan FC (2025–); Hyderabad FC (2019–2025); Telangana football team

Ganti Mohana Chandra Balayogi Athletic Stadium (G. M. C. Balayogi Athletic Stadium) is a multi-purpose stadium situated in the Gachibowli suburb of Hyderabad, Telangana, India. It is located beside International Institute of Information Technology (IIIT), Hyderabad. The stadium is part of a sports complex built in 2002 by the N. Chandrababu Naidu Government to host the 2003 Afro-Asian Games. It is used mostly for football matches. The stadium has a capacity of 18,000 and contains an eight-lane 400m running synthetic athletic track, a 10-lane 100m sprinting track and a four-lane synthetic warm-up track. Inside the athletic tracks lies a football field 105 m × 68 m (344 ft × 223 ft) in size. It was built at a cost of ₹35.30 crores covering a built-up area of 14,850 m^{2} (159,800 sq ft).

== Structure ==
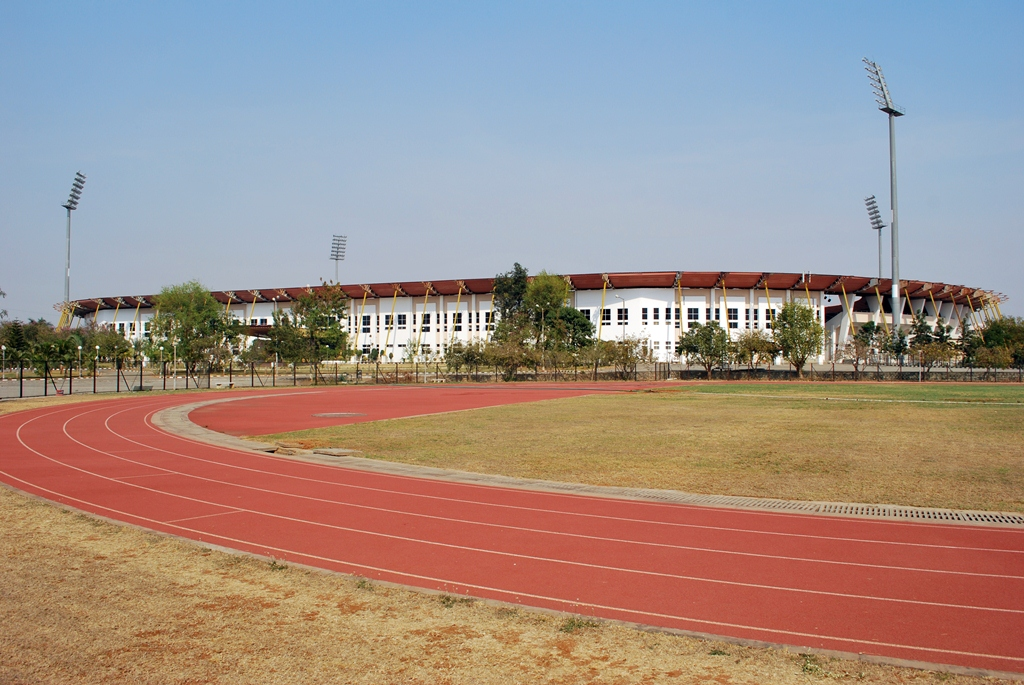
GMC Balayogi Stadium, Gachibowli

The stadium's cantilevered roof covers the spectator stands. This structural design allows a 25 m (82 ft) span cantilever allowing the spectators an unobstructed view of the sporting events. Diagonal yellow steel structural members act as tension members to balance out the forces of the cantilevered roof of the spectator stands. These members not only add to the exterior appearance, but also help in creation of a well-defined ambulatory path along the stadium. Orange coloured corrugated metal sheets wrap around the inner and outer edges of the roof trusses. This cladding enhances the appearance of the stadium greatly.

It is an ultra modern stadium with eight line competition synthetic athletic track and 4-lane synthetic practice track. It uses the latest high-mast lighting for day-night events and provides obstruction-free viewing for all spectators. The stadium was named in the memory of G. M. C. Balayogi, an incumbent Speaker of Lok Sabha who died in an air crash.

The 2003 Afro-Asian Games were held in this stadium. More than 30,000 people came to watch the opening ceremony. The opening ceremony was about two hours and forty minutes long with a laser show son-et-lumiere.

About 2,800 Kuchipudi artistes performed a centuries-old dance on 26 December 2010 to earn a place in the Guinness World Records.

== West block ==
Most of the services and administrative areas of the stadium are hosted in the west block. The west block also contains the entrance porch and lobby. The facilities hosted in the west block are:

- Public address system
- Media Centre & Press Box
- 3 service and one players' entrance
- Score board control & Games management room
- Lighting control rooms
- Public address & announcement rooms
- VIP lounges, pantries & toilets
- Office & conference rooms

== See also ==
- List of stadiums in Hyderabad, India
- 2003 Afro-Asian Games
- List of football stadiums in India
- Lists of stadiums
