= V.K.N. Menon Indoor Stadium =

Indoor stadium in Thrissur, Kerala, India

Coordinates: 10°31′56.59″N 76°13′0.62″E

VKN Menon Indoor Stadium
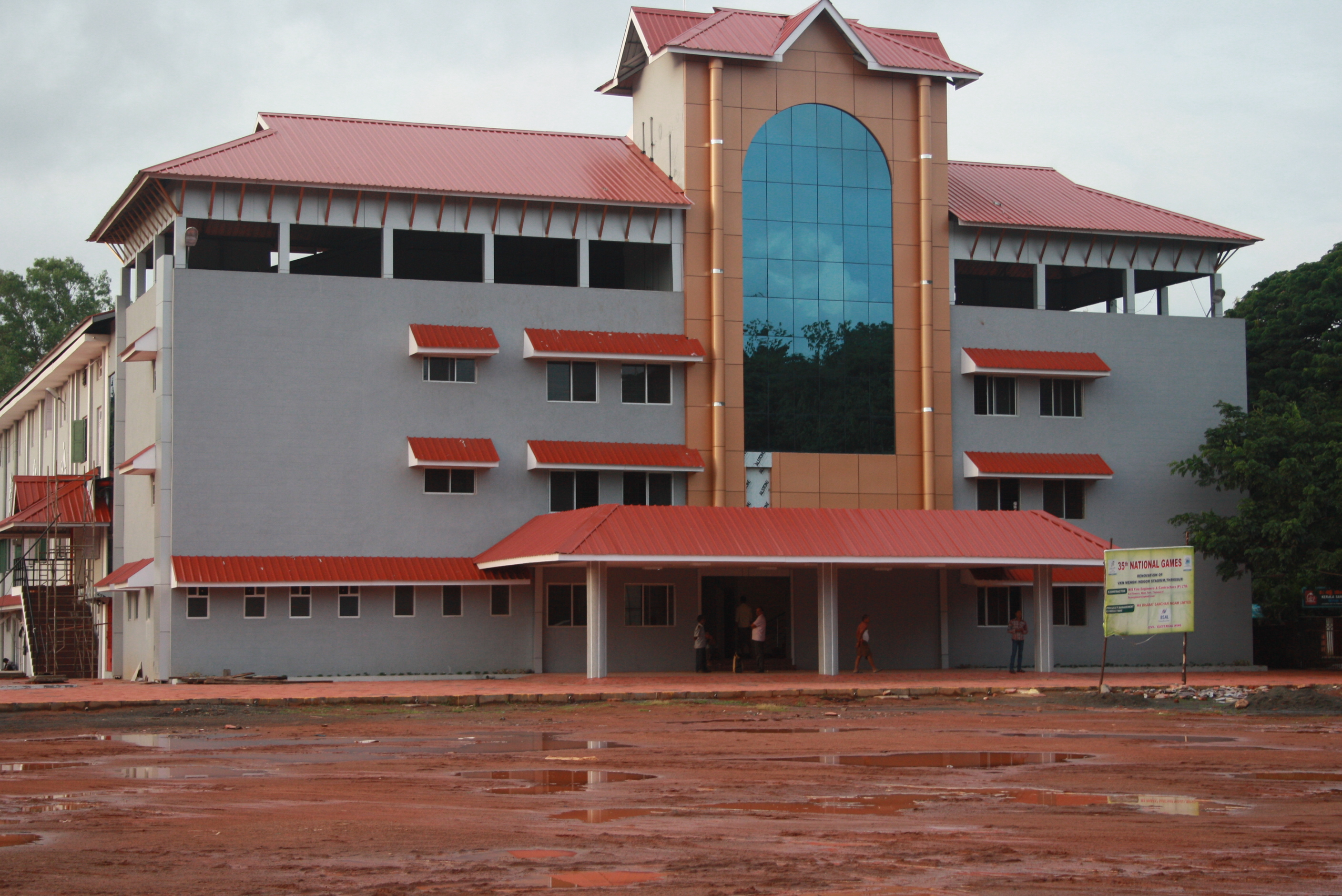
- Interactive map of VKN Menon Indoor Stadium
- Location: Thrissur city, Kerala, India
- Operator: Kerala State Sports Council
- Capacity: 2,000
- Surface: Maple Wood flooring for play area

Construction
- Built: 1981
- Opened: 1987
- Renovated: 2014
- Cost: ₹22 lakhs

VKN Menon Indoor Stadium is an indoor stadium situated in the city of Thrissur in Kerala, India. The stadium is owned by Kerala State Sports Council. The stadium is used for badminton, judo and weightlifting. The stadium has got a complete makeover for 35th National Games with maple wood flooring, advanced acoustics facilities, has 10 courts and stadium also has air- conditioned hall and modern arena lighting.
