= Sports Authority of Goa =

Agency overview
- Type: Sports administration and sports infrastructure development body
- Jurisdiction: Government of Goa
- Headquarters: 1st Floor, Athletic Stadium, Near Cujira School Complex, Opp. Goa Medical College, Bambolim, Goa
- Employees: 661
- Minister responsible: Chief Minister of Goa Dr. Pramod Sawant, Chairman
- Agency executive: Dr. Geeta Nagvekar, Chief executive officer and executive director
- Parent agency: Ministry of Sports Government of Goa
- Website: http://www.tsag.org

The Sports Authority of Goa commonly abbreviated as SAG, is a body owned fully by the Government of Goa. It is responsible for the development of sports in the Indian state of Goa. It owns and maintains 14 sports complexes which include Olympic size swimming pools, FIFA approved football stadiums, jogging tracks and around 98 sports grounds all over the state.

== History ==
The erstwhile state council of sports, renamed the Sports Authority of Goa has since its inception been rendering commendable service for the development of sports and games in Goa.

== Lusofonia Games ==
The Goa Olympic Association won hosting rights for the 3rd edition of the Lusofonia Games from the ACOLOP to be held from 18–29 January 2014. The task of development of sports infrastructure and organization of this international sporting event lies with the Sports Authority of Goa.

The sports infrastructure in the state is said to get a major boost by June 2013 for the hosting of the Lusofonia Games. Construction of new sports complexes of international standards has been proposed and the fatorda sports complex (which includes the Fatorda Stadium) is set to get a multi-crore revamp for these games.

== Administration ==
The Sports Authority of Goa is currently headed by Shri.V.M.PrabhuDesai.
