= List of indoor arenas in Slovakia =

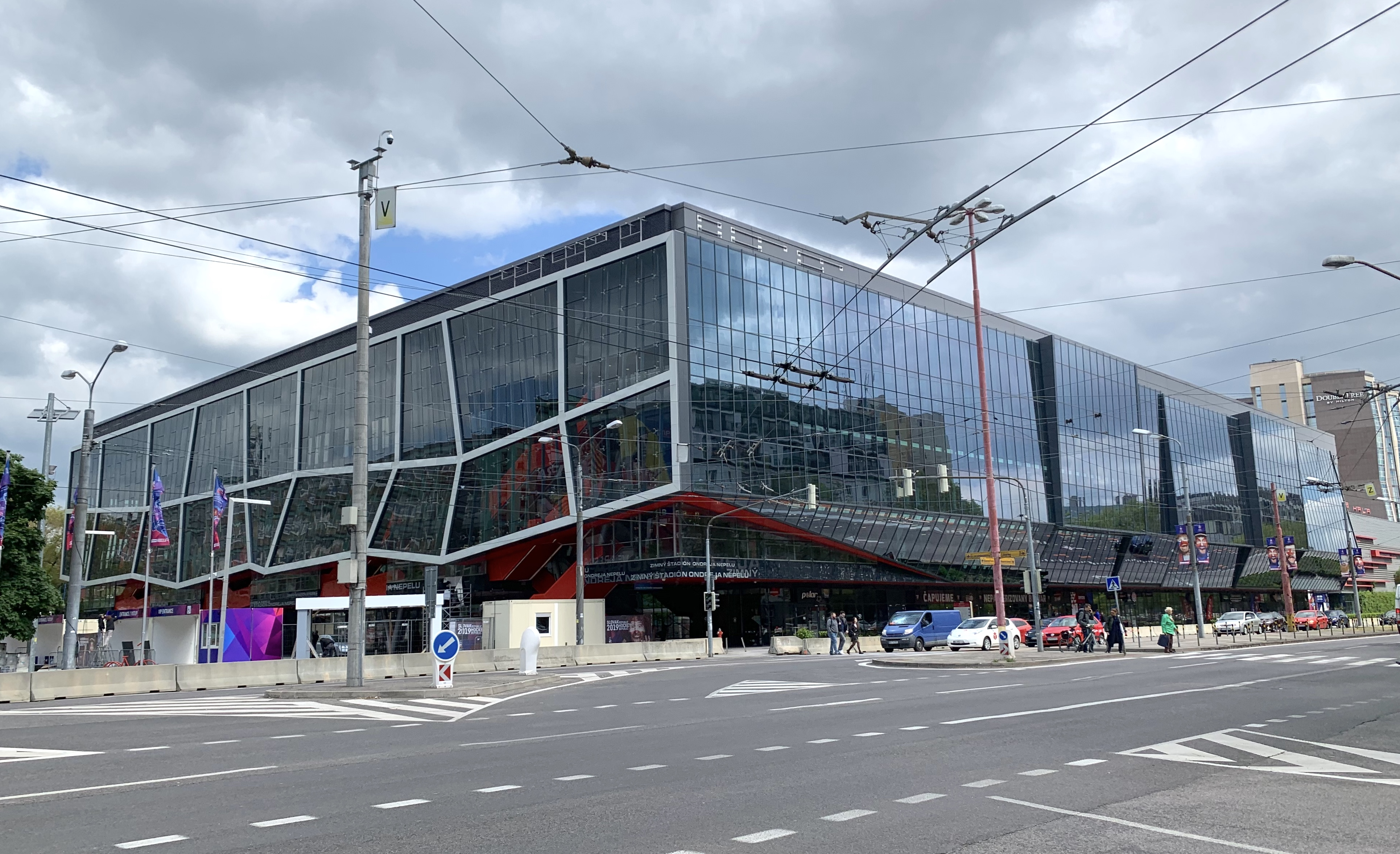
Tipos Arena

The following is a list of indoor arenas in Slovakia with capacity of at least 2,000 spectators. Most of the arenas in this list are for multi use proposes such as individual sports, team sports as well as cultural and political events.

== Currently in use ==
Location	Arena	Date built	Capacity	Tenants
Banská Bystrica	Banská Bystrica Ice Stadium	1956	3,000	HC 05 Banská Bystrica
Bratislava	Aegon Arena	2003	6,070	2005 Davis Cup
Bratislava	Tipos aréna	1940	10,200	HC Slovan Bratislava
Kežmarok	Winter Sports Stadium	1994	3,000	MHK Kežmarok
Košice	Steel Aréna	2006	8,378	HC Košice
Liptovský Mikuláš	Liptovský Mikuláš Ice Stadium	1949	3,680	MHk 32 Liptovský Mikuláš
Martin	Martin Ice Stadium	1977	4,200	MHC Martin
Nitra	Nitra Arena	1966	4,800	HK Nitra
Piešťany	Easton Arena	1986	5,000	ŠHK 37 Piešťany
Poprad	Poprad Ice Stadium	1973	4,500	HK Poprad
Prešov	City Hall Prešov	1978	4,870	HT Tatran Prešov
Prievidza	Nike Arena		3,400	BC Prievidza
Skalica	Skalica Ice Stadium	1969	4,100	HK 36 Skalica
Spiš	Spis Arena	1982	5,503	HK Spišská Nová Ves
Trenčín	Demitra Ice Stadium	1960	6,150	Dukla Trenčín
Žilina	Garmin Arena	1945	6,200	MsHK Žilina
Zvolen	Zvolen Ice Stadium	1969	5,675	HKm Zvolen

== See also ==
- List of football stadiums in Slovakia
- List of indoor arenas by capacity
