= List of Ennio Morricone concerts =

List of concerts

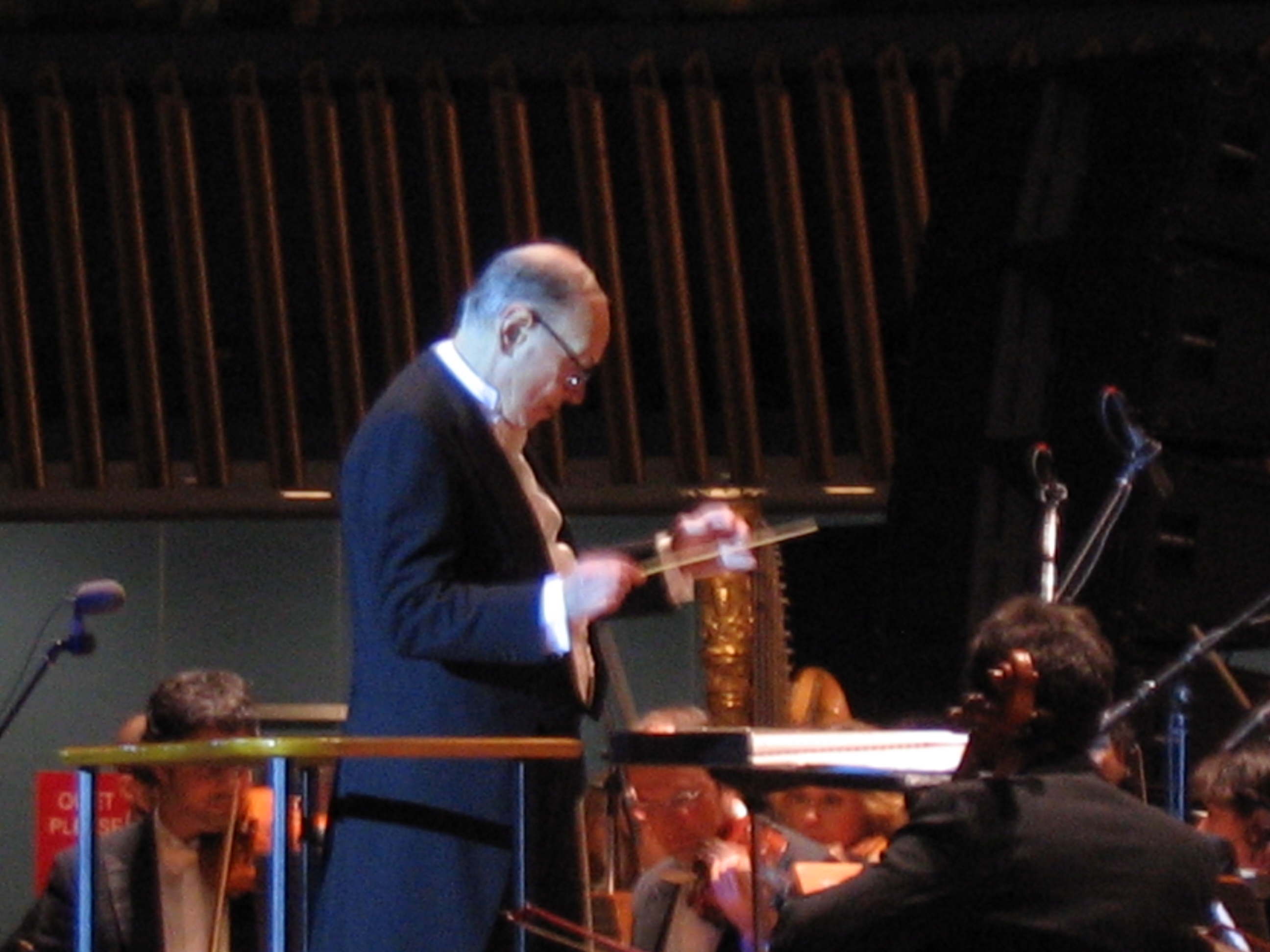
Ennio Morricone at the United Nations Headquarters on 2 February 2007

This is a list of live performances by film score composer, orchestrator, conductor and former trumpet player Ennio Morricone. He composed and arranged scores for more than 500 film and television productions.

Advised to study composition, Morricone specialized in playing trumpet in the late 40s and supported himself by playing in various jazz bands. From 1964 up to their eventual disbandment in 1980, Ennio Morricone was the trumpet player of Gruppo di Improvvisazione Nuova Consonanza (G.I.N.C.), a group of composers who performed and recorded avant-garde free improvisations. The Rome-based avant-garde ensemble was dedicated to the development of improvisation and new music methods. The ensemble functioned as a laboratory of sorts, working with anti-musical systems and noise techniques in an attempt to redefine the new music ensemble and explore "New Consonance." Morricone played a key role in The Group and was among the core members in its revolving line-up; in addition to serving as their trumpet player, he directed them on many occasions and they can be heard on a large number of his scores from the 1970s.

Ennio Morricone has conducted many orchestras worldwide. He is serving as one of the main conductors of the Orchestra Roma Sinfonietta since the mid-90s. He has conducted over 300 concerts worldwide and is still performing regularly.

The composer performed in such prestigious venues as the Great Hall in Beijing, the General Assembly Hall of the UN in New York City, the Royal Albert Hall in London, the Kremlin in Moscow and the Arena di Verona. Morricone made his American debut in 2007 at Radio City Music Hall.

This list includes only performances by Ennio Morricone as conductor of his film music and classical works.

== Performances as conductor ==
Date	City	Country	Venue	Comment
Europe
20 September 1984 [2x]	Paris	France	Salle Pleyel	with the Orchestre national des Pays de la Loire
September 1986	Paris	France		with the Orchestre national des Pays de la Loire
6 June 1987	Corbeil-Essonnes	France		with the Orchestre national d'Île-de-France
15 October 1987	Antwerp	Belgium	Sportpaleis	with the Metropole Orchestra and Alide Maria Salvetta
November 1987	Ghent	Belgium		with the Metropole Orchestra and Alide Maria Salvetta
22 May 1988	Seville	Spain	Lope de Vega Theatre	with the Spanish National Orchestra and Alide Maria Salvetta
18–19 June 1988	Rotterdam	Netherlands	De Doelen	with the Metropole Orchestra and Alide Maria Salvetta
June 1988	Antwerp	Belgium		with the Metropole Orchestra and Alide Maria Salvetta
June 1988	Brussels	Belgium		with the Metropole Orchestra and Alide Maria Salvetta
25 June 1988	Amsterdam	Netherlands	Amsterdam RAI Exhibition and Convention Centre	with the Metropole Orchestra and Alide Maria Salvetta
December 1988	Turin	Italy	Teatro Regio	exact day of December not mentioned in the concert's review
15 April 1989	Liège	Belgium	7e festival international de la guitare	with the Orchestre Philharmonique de Liège
8 September 1990	Rome	Italy		with the RAI National Symphony Orchestra
1995	Tortona	Italy		exact day and month not mentioned in the concert's review
April 1995	Rome	Italy	Teatro Parioli	"Omaggio a Joffé"
8 May 1995	Budapest	Hungary	Hungarian State Opera House	with the Failoni Chamber Orchestra
15 October 1995	Turin	Italy	Teatro Regio	with the Orchestra Roma Sinfonietta
20 October 1995	Rome	Italy	Premio Rota	with the Orchestra Roma Sinfonietta
7, 9–10 November 1998	Rome	Italy	Accademia Nazionale di Santa Cecilia	with the Orchestra dell'Accademia Nazionale di Santa Cecilia and Dulce Pontes. A compilation of the recordings of these concerts was officially released as "Cinema concerto a Santa Cecilia".
21–22 July 1999	Rome	Italy	Villa Giulia	with the Orchestra dell'Accademia Nazionale di Santa Cecilia
3 September 1999	Linz	Austria	Brucknerhaus	with the Bruckner Orchestra Linz
5–6 November 1999	Seville	Spain	Teatro de la Maestranza	with the Royal Seville Symphony Orchestra
27 May 2000	Warsaw	Poland	TP S.A. Music and Film Festival	with the Polish National Radio Symphony Orchestra and Orietta Manente
4 June 2000	Parma	Italy	PalaCassa delle Fiere di Parma	with the Orchestra Sinfonica Arturo Toscanini and Gemma Bertagnolli
9 June 2000	Ghent	Belgium	Kuipke	with the National Orchestra of Belgium and Gemma Bertagnolli
10–11 March 2001	London	United Kingdom	Barbican Centre	with the Orchestra Roma Sinfonietta
22 March 2002	Rome	Italy	Accademia Nazionale di Santa Cecilia	with the Orchestra Roma Sinfonietta
6 July 2002	Taormina	Italy	Ancient theatre of Taormina	with the Orchestra Roma Sinfonietta
7 July 2002	Palermo	Italy	Teatro Massimo	with the Orchestra Roma Sinfonietta
26–27 July 2002	Szeged	Hungary	Szeged Open-air Festival	with the Orchestra Roma Sinfonietta
28 September 2002	Verona	Italy	Verona Arena	with the Orchestra Roma Sinfonietta
21 October 2002	Paris	France	Palais des congrès de Paris	with the Orchestra Roma Sinfonietta
27 July 2003	Naples	Italy	Arena Flegrea	with the Orchestra Roma Sinfonietta
10 November 2003	London	United Kingdom	Royal Albert Hall	with the Orchestra Roma Sinfonietta
27–29 November 2003	Rome	Italy	Accademia Nazionale di Santa Cecilia	
26 March 2004	Milan	Italy	PalaSharp	
11 April 2004	Rome	Italy	Santa Maria in Aracoeli	with the Orchestra Roma Sinfonietta
25 April 2004	Budapest	Hungary	László Papp Budapest Sports Arena	with the Győr Philharmonic Orchestra
16 May 2004	Rome	Italy	Circus Maximus	with the Orchestra Roma Sinfonietta
17 May 2004	Madrid	Spain		
18 May 2004	Valencia	Spain		
Asia
4–6 June 2004	Tokyo	Japan	Tokyo International Forum	
Europe
19 June 2004	Locarno	Switzerland	Piazza Grande	
28 June 2004	Lisbon	Portugal	Monsanto Forest Park	with the Orchestra Roma Sinfonietta
1 July 2004	Rome	Italy	Roman Catholic Archdiocese of Manfredonia-Vieste-S. Giovanni Rotondo	
2 July 2004	Monte San Giovanni Campano	Italy	Piazza Marconi	with the Orchestra Roma Sinfonietta
11 September 2004	Verona	Italy	Verona Arena	with the Orchestra Roma Sinfonietta
18 September 2004	Rome	Italy	Capitoline Hill	with the Orchestra Roma Sinfonietta
20 October 2004	Munich	Germany	Gasteig	with the Munich Radio Orchestra
30 October 2004	Rome	Italy	Goethe-Institut	with the Gruppo Musica d'Oggi
16 November 2004	Rome	Italy	Sapienza University of Rome	with the Orchestra Roma Sinfonietta, concert with Yo-Yo Ma
4 December 2004	Pesaro	Italy	P. B. A. Palas	
16–17 December 2004	Rome	Italy	Accademia Nazionale di Santa Cecilia	with the Orchestra dell'Accademia Nazionale di Santa Cecilia
31 December 2004	Rome	Italy	Quirinal Palace	with the Orchestra Roma Sinfonietta
14 May 2005	Florence	Italy	Nelson Mandela Forum	with the Orchestra Roma Sinfonietta
27 May 2005	Bratislava	Slovakia	Conserthaus	with the Orchestra Roma Sinfonietta
30–31 May 2005	Bilbao	Spain	Euskalduna Conference Centre and Concert Hall	with the Orchestra Roma Sinfonietta
23 June 2005	Moscow	Russia	Grand Kremlin Palace	with the Tchaikovsky Symphony Orchestra
1 July 2005	Lecce	Italy	Cave di Cavallino	with the Orchestra Roma Sinfonietta
4–5 July 2005	Athens	Greece	Parthenon Theatre	with the Orchestra Roma Sinfonietta
Asia
6 October 2005	Osaka	Japan	Festival Hall	with the Orchestra Roma Sinfonietta
8–9 October 2005	Tokyo	Japan	Tokyo International Forum	with the Orchestra Roma Sinfonietta
Europe
14 October 2005	Rome	Italy	Auditorium Via della Conciliazione	with the Orchestra Roma Sinfonietta
13 February 2006	Turin	Italy	Medals Plaza - Olimpiadi Invernali	with the Orchestra Roma Sinfonietta
25–28 February 2006	Rome	Italy	Accademia Nazionale di Santa Cecilia	with the Orchestra dell'Accademia Nazionale di Santa Cecilia
15 July 2006	Monte Porzio Catone	Italy	University of Rome Tor Vergata	with the Orchestra Roma Sinfonietta
24 July 2006	Verona	Italy	Verona Arena	with the Orchestra and Choir of Scala di Milano
25 July 2006	Taormina	Italy	Ancient theatre of Taormina	with the Orchestra and Choir of Scala di Milano
14 October 2006	Rome	Italy	Auditorium Via della Conciliazione	with the Orchestra dell'Accademia Nazionale di Santa Cecilia
21 October 2006	Auxerre	France	Auxerrexpo	with the Orchestra Roma Sinfonietta
10 November 2006	Santander	Spain	Palacio de Deportes de Santander	with the Orchestra Roma Sinfonietta
1–2 December 2006	London	United Kingdom	Hammersmith Apollo	with the Orchestra Roma Sinfonietta
16 December 2006	Milan	Italy	Piazza del Duomo	with the Orchestra Roma Sinfonietta
North America
2 February 2007	New York City	United States	United Nations Headquarters	with the Orchestra Roma Sinfonietta
3 February 2007	New York City	United States	Radio City Music Hall	with the Orchestra Roma Sinfonietta
Europe
3 March 2007	Rome	Italy	Auditorium di Via della Conciliazione	with the Orchestra Roma Sinfonietta
16 April 2007	Milan	Italy	La Scala	with the Orchestra and Choir of Scala di Milano
24 April 2007	Casalecchio di Reno	Italy	Unipol Arena	with the Orchestra Roma Sinfonietta
South America
5 May 2007	Rio de Janeiro	Brazil	Teatro Municipal	with the Orquestra Petrobrás Sinfônica
6 May 2007	São Paulo	Brazil		with the Orquestra Petrobrás Sinfônica
Europe
14 May 2007	Civitavecchia	Italy		with the Orchestra Roma Sinfonietta
21 May 2007	Rome	Italy	Sapienza University of Rome	
7 June 2007	Kraków	Poland	Main Square	with the Orchestra Roma Sinfonietta
16 June 2007	Monza	Italy	Royal Villa of Monza	with the Orchestra Roma Sinfonietta
30 June 2007	Naples	Italy	Arena Flegrea	with the Orchestra Roma Sinfonietta
5 July 2007	Florence	Italy	Piazzale Michelangelo	with the Orchestra Roma Sinfonietta
13 July 2007	Lorca	Spain	Plaza de Toros	with the RTVE Symphony Orchestra
22 July 2007	San Cassiano	Italy		
10–11 September 2007	Venice	Italy	Piazza San Marco	with the Orchestra Roma Sinfonietta
Asia
2–3 October 2007	Seoul	South Korea	Olympic Gymnastics Arena	with the Orchestra Roma Sinfonietta
Europe
21 October 2007	Catanzaro	Italy	Teatro Politeama	with the Orchestra Roma Sinfonietta
27 [2x], 28–30 October 2007	Rome	Italy	Accademia Nazionale di Santa Cecilia	with the Orchestra dell'Accademia Nazionale di Santa Cecilia, with two performances on the 27th (11 AM & 6 PM)
20 November 2007	Rome	Italy	Sala Nervi	with the Orchestra Roma Sinfonietta
21 November 2007	Rome	Italy	Auditorium della Conciliazione	with the Orchestra Roma Sinfonietta
12 December 2007	Vienna	Austria	Wiener Stadthalle	with the Orchestra Roma Sinfonietta
16 December 2007	Brescia	Italy	Teatro Grande	
19 December 2007	Rome	Italy	Basilica di Santa Maria sopra Minerva	with the Orchestra Roma Sinfonietta
13 February 2008	Rome	Italy	Auditorium della Conciliazione	
7 March 2008	Moscow	Russia	Grand Kremlin Palace	
South America
19–20 March 2008	Santiago	Chile	Parque Bicentenario	with the Orchestra Roma Sinfonietta
24 March 2008	São Paulo	Brazil	Teatro Alfa	with the Orchestra Roma Sinfonietta
Europe
22 May 2008	Turin	Italy	Pala Alpitour	with the Orchestra Roma Sinfonietta
23 May 2008	Ravenna	Italy	Pala De André	with the Orchestra Roma Sinfonietta
North America
27 May 2008	Mexico City	Mexico	National Auditorium	with the Orchestra Roma Sinfonietta
29 May 2008	Monterrey	Mexico	Monterrey Arena	with the Orchestra Roma Sinfonietta
31 May 2008	Guadalajara	Mexico	Telmex Auditorium	with the Orchestra Roma Sinfonietta
Europe
1 July 2008	Vilnius	Lithuania	Vingis Park	with the Orchestra Roma Sinfonietta
11 July 2008	Pescara	Italy	Area di Risulta	with the Orchestra Roma Sinfonietta
18 July 2008	Lucca	Italy	Piazza Napoleone	with the Orchestra Roma Sinfonietta
25 August 2008	Sarsina	Italy	Basilica Cattedrale	with the Orchestra Roma Sinfonietta
27 August 2008	Ljubljana	Slovenia	Križanke	with the Orchestra Roma Sinfonietta
13 September 2008	Bari	Italy	Stadio della Vittoria	with the Orchestra Roma Sinfonietta
28–29 September 2008	Athens	Greece	Odeon of Herodes Atticus	with the Orchestra Roma Sinfonietta
11 October 2008	Rome	Italy	Accademia Nazionale di Santa Cecilia	with the Orchestra Roma Sinfonietta
17–18 October 2008	Belfast	United Kingdom	Waterfront Hall	with the Orchestra Roma Sinfonietta
14 November 2008	Bologna	Italy	Land Rover Arena	with the Orchestra Roma Sinfonietta
14 February 2009	Belgrade	Serbia	Kombank Arena	with the Orchestra Roma Sinfonietta
Africa
15 May 2009	Rabat	Morocco	Mawazine	with the Győr Philharmonic Orchestra
Asia
23 May 2009	Beijing	China	Great Hall of the People	with the Győr Philharmonic Orchestra
26–27 May 2009	Seoul	South Korea	Olympic Gymnastics Arena	with the Győr Philharmonic Orchestra
31 May 2009	Taipei	Taiwan	Taipei Dome	with the Győr Philharmonic Orchestra
Europe
25 June 2009	Turin	Italy	Palace of Venaria	with the Győr Philharmonic Orchestra
26 June 2009	Bergamo	Italy	Arena estiva Fiera	with the Győr Philharmonic Orchestra
28 June 2009	Moscow	Russia	Barvikha Concert Hall	with the Győr Philharmonic Orchestra
2 July 2009	Rome	Italy	Accademia Nazionale di Santa Cecilia	with the Orchestra dell'Accademia Nazionale di Santa Cecilia
3 July 2009	Palestrina	Italy	Temple of Fortuna Primigenia	with the Orchestra dell'Accademia Nazionale di Santa Cecilia
12 July 2009	Ohrid	Macedonia	Ancient Theatre of Ohrid	with the Győr Philharmonic Orchestra
16 July 2009	Aosta	Italy	Parco Del Castello Di Fénis	with the Győr Philharmonic Orchestra
21 July 2009	Rome	Italy	Hadrian's Villa	with the Orchestra Roma Sinfonietta
23 July 2009	Milan	Italy	Arena Civica	with the Orchestra Roma Sinfonietta
30 August 2009	Gdańsk	Poland	Gdańsk Shipyard	with the Győr Philharmonic Orchestra
19 October 2009	Catanzaro	Italy	Teatro Politeama	with the Orchestra Roma Sinfonietta
26 November 2009	L'Aquila	Italy	Auditorium Guardia di Finanza	with the Orchestra Roma Sinfonietta
28 November 2009	Florence	Italy	Teatro Comunale Florence	with the Orchestra Roma Sinfonietta
1 December 2009	Milan	Italy	Teatro degli Arcimboldi	with the Orchestra Roma Sinfonietta
18 December 2009	Latina	Italy	Teatro G.D'Annunzio	with the Orchestra Roma Sinfonietta
10 April 2010	London	United Kingdom	Royal Albert Hall	with the Orchestra Roma Sinfonietta
Asia
2 June 2010	Shanghai	China	Red Hall Expo Park	with the Orchestra Roma Sinfonietta
Europe
16–17 June 2010	Rome	Italy	Accademia Nazionale di Santa Cecilia	with the Orchestra dell'Accademia Nazionale di Santa Cecilia
4 September 2010	Bari	Italy	Stadio della Vittoria	with the Orchestra Roma Sinfonietta
11 September 2010	Verona	Italy	Verona Arena	with the Orchestra Roma Sinfonietta
12 September 2010	Palermo	Italy	Teatro Politeama Garibaldi	with the Orchestra Sinfonica Siciliana
4 October 2010	Warsaw	Poland	Grand Theatre	with the Orchestra Roma Sinfonietta
19 November 2010	Milan	Italy	Mediolanum Forum	with the Orchestra Roma Sinfonietta
4 December 2010	Pesaro	Italy	Adriatic Arena	with the Orchestra Roma Sinfonietta
8 March 2011	Moscow	Russia	Crocus City Hall	with the Orfei Radio Symphonic Orchestra and the Moscow Synodal Choir
1 May 2011	Rome	Italy	Piazza San Giovanni	with the Orchestra Roma Sinfonietta
Asia
16–18 May 2011	Seoul	South Korea	Sejong Center	with the Korean Symphonic Orchestra and Choir
South America
18–19 June 2011	Santiago	Chile	Movistar Arena	with the Korean Symphonic Orchestra and Choir
Europe
8 July 2011	Rome	Italy	Accademia Nazionale di Santa Cecilia	with the Orchestra dell'Accademia Nazionale di Santa Cecilia
14–15 July 2011	Prague	Czech Republic	Smetana Hall	with the Czech National Symphony Orchestra
18 September 2011	Vicenza	Italy	Piazza dei Signori	with the Orchestra Roma Sinfonietta
Asia
24 October 2011	Tashkent	Uzbekistan	International Palace Forum	with the National Symphonic Orchestra of Uzbekistan
Europe
4 November 2011	Rome	Italy	Piazza del Popolo	with the Orchestra Roma Sinfonietta
11 November 2011	Catanzaro	Italy	Teatro Politeama	with the Orchestra Roma Sinfonietta
11 December 2011	Moscow	Russia	State Kremlin Palace	with the Orfei Radio Symphonic Orchestra and the Moscow Synodal Choir
15 December 2011	Saint Petersburg	Russia	Oktyabrskiy Big Concert Hall	
20 December 2011	Kyiv	Ukraine	Palace "Ukraine"	
15 January 2012	Rome	Italy	Accademia Nazionale di Santa Cecilia	with the Orchestra Roma Sinfonietta
Oceania
26 February 2012	Perth	Australia	Burswood Theatre	with the WA Youth Orchestra
2 March 2012	Adelaide	Australia	Adelaide Festival/Elder Park	with the Adelaide Symphony Orchestra
Europe
23–24 March 2012	Turin	Italy	Auditorium RAI	with the RAI National Symphony Orchestra
3 April 2012	Rome	Italy	Accademia Nazionale di Santa Cecilia	with the Orchestra Roma Sinfonietta
23 May 2012	Wrocław	Poland	Wrocław Opera	with the Orchestra Roma Sinfonietta
26 May 2012	Milan	Italy	Teatro degli Arcimboldi	with the FuturOrchestra
1 June 2012	Rome	Italy	Auditorium Conciliazione	with the Georges Méliès Orchestra
25–26 July 2012	Rome	Italy	Accademia Nazionale di Santa Cecilia	with the Orchestra dell'Accademia Nazionale di Santa Cecilia
25 August 2012	Rimini	Italy	Piazzale Federico Fellini	with the Orchestra Roma Sinfonietta
8 September 2012	Udine	Italy	Piazza I° Maggio	with the Orchestra Roma Sinfonietta, the TEN 2002-2012 Tour
15 September 2012	Verona	Italy	Verona Arena	with the Orchestra Roma Sinfonietta, the TEN 2002-2012 Tour
3 November 2012	Florence	Italy	Nelson Mandela Forum	with the Orchestra Roma Sinfonietta, the TEN 2002-2012 Tour
8 November 2012	Turin	Italy	Pala Alpitour	with the Orchestra Roma Sinfonietta, the TEN 2002-2012 Tour
10 November 2012	Milan	Italy	Mediolanum Forum	with the Orchestra Roma Sinfonietta, the TEN 2002-2012 Tour
16 November 2012	Rome	Italy	PalaLottomatica	with the Orchestra Roma Sinfonietta, the TEN 2002-2012 Tour
24 November 2012	Casalecchio di Reno	Italy	Unipol Arena	with the Orchestra Roma Sinfonietta, the TEN 2002-2012 Tour
1 December 2012	Padova	Italy	PalaFabris	with the Orchestra Roma Sinfonietta, the TEN 2002-2012 Tour
6 December 2012	Moscow	Russia	State Kremlin Palace	with the Sofia Symphony Orchestra
15 December 2012	Assisi	Italy	Basilica of San Francesco d'Assisi	with the RAI National Symphony Orchestra
22 December 2012	Antwerp	Belgium	Sportpaleis	with the orchestra "Orkest der Lage Landen" and the chorus "Fine Fleur"
23 March 2013	Genova	Italy	Porto di Genova	with the Orchestra Roma Sinfonietta
22 June 2013	Civitavecchia	Italy	Porto di Civitavecchia	with the Orchestra Roma Sinfonietta
4 July 2013	Sordevolo	Italy	Anfiteatro Giovanni Paolo II	with the RAI National Symphony Orchestra and the Verona Lyric Symphonic Choir
25 July 2013	Rome	Italy	Baths of Caracalla	Orchestra Del Teatro Dell'Opera Di Roma
27–28 July 2013	Dublin	Ireland	Royal Hospital Kilmainham/Irish Museum of Modern Art	with the Orchestra Roma Sinfonietta
22 August 2013	Verona	Italy	Verona Arena	with the RAI National Symphony Orchestra
3 November 2013	Kyiv	Ukraine	Palace "Ukraine"	
8 November 2013	Minsk	Belarus	Minsk-Arena	
13–14 November 2013	Moscow	Russia	Crocus City Hall	with the Sofia Symphony Orchestra
South America
24 November 2013	Santiago	Chile	Estadio Bicentenario de La Florida	with the Chilean Symphonic Orchestra
26 November 2013	San Francisco de Mostazal	Chile	Casino Monticello	with the Chilean Symphonic Orchestra
Europe
10 December 2013	Sofia	Bulgaria	Armeets Arena	with the Classic FM Radio Orchestra
25 January 2014	Baku	Azerbaijan	Heydar Aliyev Palace	with the Azerbaijan State Symphony Orchestra and the Azerbaijan State Choir Capella
4 February 2014	Paris	France	AccorHotels Arena	50 Years of Music Tour, with the Budapest Modern Art Orchestra
9 February 2014	Prague	Czech Republic	O_{2} Arena	50 Years of Music Tour, with the Budapest Modern Art Orchestra
11 February 2014	Berlin	Germany	O_{2} World	50 Years of Music Tour, with the Budapest Modern Art Orchestra
13 February 2014	Zürich	Switzerland	Hallenstadion	50 Years of Music Tour, with the Budapest Modern Art Orchestra
15 February 2014	Budapest	Hungary	László Papp Budapest Sports Arena	50 Years of Music Tour, with the Budapest Modern Art Orchestra
16 February 2014	Vienna	Austria	Wiener Stadthalle	50 Years of Music Tour, with the Budapest Modern Art Orchestra
1 February 2015	Amsterdam	Netherlands	Ziggo Dome	My Life in Music Tour, with the Czech National Symphony Orchestra
3 February 2015	Brussels	Belgium	Palais 12	My Life in Music Tour, with the Czech National Symphony Orchestra
5 February 2015	London	United Kingdom	The O_{2} Arena	My Life in Music Tour, with the Czech National Symphony Orchestra
7 February 2015	Dublin	Ireland	3Arena	My Life in Music Tour, with the Czech National Symphony Orchestra
10 February 2015	Berlin	Germany	O_{2} World	My Life in Music Tour, with the Czech National Symphony Orchestra
12 February 2015	Prague	Czech Republic	O_{2} Arena	My Life in Music Tour, with the Czech National Symphony Orchestra
14 February 2015	Kraków	Poland	Tauron Arena Kraków	My Life in Music Tour, with the Czech National Symphony Orchestra
17 February 2015	Zürich	Switzerland	Hallenstadion	My Life in Music Tour, with the Czech National Symphony Orchestra
18 February 2015	Stuttgart	Germany	Hanns-Martin-Schleyer-Halle	My Life in Music Tour, with the Czech National Symphony Orchestra
20 February 2015	Bratislava	Slovakia	Ondrej Nepela Arena	My Life in Music Tour, with the Czech National Symphony Orchestra
7 March 2015	Milan	Italy	Mediolanum Forum	My Life in Music Tour, with the Czech National Symphony Orchestra
12 March 2015	Nice	France	Palais Nikaïa	My Life in Music Tour, with the Czech National Symphony Orchestra
14 March 2015	Toulouse	France	Le Zénith de Toulouse	My Life in Music Tour, with the Czech National Symphony Orchestra
16 March 2015	Nantes	France	Le Zénith Nantes Métropole	My Life in Music Tour, with the Czech National Symphony Orchestra
18 March 2015	Lyon	France	Halle Tony Garnier	My Life in Music Tour, with the Czech National Symphony Orchestra
20 March 2015	Strasbourg	France	Zénith de Strasbourg	My Life in Music Tour, with the Czech National Symphony Orchestra
22 March 2015	Lille	France	Zénith de Lille	My Life in Music Tour, with the Czech National Symphony Orchestra
24 March 2015	Luxembourg	Grand Duchy of Luxembourg	d'Coque	My Life in Music Tour, with the Czech National Symphony Orchestra
26 March 2015	Oberhausen	Germany	König Pilsener Arena	My Life in Music Tour, with the Czech National Symphony Orchestra
28 March 2015	Hamburg	Germany	O_{2} World	My Life in Music Tour, with the Czech National Symphony Orchestra
30 March 2015	Frankfurt	Germany	Festhalle Frankfurt	My Life in Music Tour, with the Czech National Symphony Orchestra
11 April 2015	Zagreb	Croatia	Arena Zagreb	with the Zagreb Philharmonic Orchestra
15 May 2015	Casalecchio di Reno	Italy	Unipol Arena	My Life in Music Tour, with the Orchestra Roma Sinfonietta
16 May 2015	Florence	Italy	Nelson Mandela Forum	My Life in Music Tour, with the Orchestra Roma Sinfonietta
10 June 2015	Rome	Italy	Church of the Gesù	with the Orchestra Roma Sinfonietta, world premiere of the "Mass for Pope Francis"
2 July 2015	Rome	Italy	Accademia Nazionale di Santa Cecilia	with the Orchestra dell'Accademia Nazionale di Santa Cecilia
11 July 2015	Nîmes	France	Arena of Nîmes	My Life in Music Tour, with the Orchestra Roma Sinfonietta
12 September 2015	Verona	Italy	Verona Arena	My Life in Music Tour, with the Orchestra Roma Sinfonietta
15 January 2016	Prague	Czech Republic	O_{2} Arena	60 Years of Music Tour, with the Czech National Symphony Orchestra
17 January 2016	Budapest	Hungary	László Papp Budapest Sports Arena	60 Years of Music Tour, with the Czech National Symphony Orchestra
19 January 2016	Bratislava	Slovakia	Ondrej Nepela Arena	60 Years of Music Tour, with the Czech National Symphony Orchestra
14 February 2016	Dublin	Ireland	3Arena	60 Years of Music Tour, with the Czech National Symphony Orchestra
16 February 2016	London	United Kingdom	The O_{2} Arena	60 Years of Music Tour, with the Czech National Symphony Orchestra
18 February 2016	Cologne	Germany	Lanxess Arena	60 Years of Music Tour, with the Czech National Symphony Orchestra
20 February 2016	Antwerp	Belgium	Sportpaleis	60 Years of Music Tour, with the Czech National Symphony Orchestra
21 February 2016	Amsterdam	Netherlands	Ziggo Dome	60 Years of Music Tour, with the Czech National Symphony Orchestra
23 February 2016	Wrocław	Poland	Centennial Hall	60 Years of Music Tour, with the Czech National Symphony Orchestra
23 June 2016	Woodstock	United Kingdom	Blenheim Palace	60 Years of Music Tour, with the Czech National Symphony Orchestra
25-26 June 2016	Ghent	Belgium	Sint-Pietersplein	60 Years of Music Tour, with the Czech National Symphony Orchestra
24-25 September 2016	Paris	France	Palais des congrès de Paris	60 Years of Music Tour, with the Czech National Symphony Orchestra
5–7 October 2016	Rome	Italy	Accademia Nazionale di Santa Cecilia	with the Orchestra dell'Accademia Nazionale di Santa Cecilia
12 November 2016	Vatican City	Vatican City State	Paul VI Audience Hall	with the Orchestra Roma Sinfonietta
28 November 2016	Stockholm	Sweden	Ericsson Globe	60 Years of Music Tour, with the Czech National Symphony Orchestra
30 November 2016	Helsinki	Finland	Hartwall Arena	60 Years of Music Tour, with the Czech National Symphony Orchestra
2 December 2016	Copenhagen	Denmark	Forum Copenhagen	60 Years of Music Tour, with the Czech National Symphony Orchestra
4 February 2017	Prague	Czech Republic	O_{2} Arena	60 Years of Music Tour, with the Czech National Symphony Orchestra
6 February 2017	Kraków	Poland	Tauron Arena Kraków	60 Years of Music Tour, with the Czech National Symphony Orchestra
8 February 2017	Vienna	Austria	Wiener Stadthalle	60 Years of Music Tour, with the Czech National Symphony Orchestra
5 March 2017	Zürich	Switzerland	Hallenstadion	60 Years of Music Tour, with the Czech National Symphony Orchestra
7 March 2017	Munich	Germany	Olympiahalle	60 Years of Music Tour, with the Czech National Symphony Orchestra
9 March 2017	Mannheim	Germany	SAP Arena	60 Years of Music Tour, with the Czech National Symphony Orchestra
7 July 2017	Rome	Italy	Foro Italico	60 Years of Music Tour, with the Orchestra Roma Sinfonietta
9 July 2017	Lucca	Italy	Piazza Napoleone	60 Years of Music Tour, with the Orchestra Roma Sinfonietta
11 July 2017	Caserta	Italy	Royal Palace of Caserta	60 Years of Music Tour, with the Orchestra Roma Sinfonietta
13 July 2017	Caserta	Italy	Royal Palace of Caserta	60 Years of Music Tour, with the Orchestra Roma Sinfonietta
30-31 August 2017	Verona	Italy	Verona Arena	60 Years of Music Tour, with the Orchestra Roma Sinfonietta
19 September 2017	Rotterdam	Netherlands	Rotterdam Ahoy	60 Years of Music Tour, with the Czech National Symphony Orchestra
21 September 2017	Paris	France	AccorHotels Arena	60 Years of Music Tour, with the Czech National Symphony Orchestra
23 September 2017	Dublin	Ireland	3Arena	60 Years of Music Tour, with the Czech National Symphony Orchestra
14 October 2017	Łódź	Poland	Atlas Arena	60 Years of Music Tour, with the Czech National Symphony Orchestra
16 October 2017	Prague	Czech Republic	O_{2} Arena	60 Years of Music Tour, with the Czech National Symphony Orchestra
18 October 2017	Budapest	Hungary	László Papp Budapest Sports Arena	60 Years of Music Tour, with the Czech National Symphony Orchestra
1 December 2017	Casalecchio di Reno	Italy	Unipol Arena	60 Years of Music Tour, with the Orchestra Roma Sinfonietta
2 December 2017	Milan	Italy	Mediolanum Forum	60 Years of Music Tour, with the Orchestra Roma Sinfonietta
2 March 2018	Florence	Italy	Nelson Mandela Forum	60 Years of Music Tour, with the Orchestra Roma Sinfonietta
4 March 2018	Turin	Italy	Pala Alpitour	60 Years of Music Tour, with the Orchestra Roma Sinfonietta
6 March 2018	Milan	Italy	Mediolanum Forum	60 Years of Music Tour, with the Orchestra Roma Sinfonietta
19 May 2018	Shekvetili	Georgia	Black Sea Arena	60 Years of Music Tour, with the Orchestra Roma Sinfonietta
16-18 June 2018	Rome	Italy	Baths of Caracalla	60 Years of Music Tour, with the Orchestra Roma Sinfonietta
20 June 2018	Locarno	Switzerland	Piazza Grande	60 Years of Music Tour, with the Orchestra Roma Sinfonietta
21 June 2018	Parma	Italy	Parco Cittadella	60 Years of Music Tour, with the Orchestra Roma Sinfonietta
23 June 2018	Nîmes	France	Arena of Nîmes	60 Years of Music Tour, with the Orchestra Roma Sinfonietta
29 June 2018	Rome	Italy	Baths of Caracalla	60 Years of Music Tour, with the Orchestra Roma Sinfonietta
15 July 2018	Prague	Czech Republic	Smetana Hall	with the Czech National Symphony Orchestra
27 September 2018	Rome	Italy	Accademia Nazionale di Santa Cecilia	with the Orchestra dell'Accademia Nazionale di Santa Cecilia
5 November 2018	Saint Petersburg	Russia	Ice Palace	60 Years of Music Tour, with the Czech National Symphony Orchestra
7 November 2018	Moscow	Russia	State Kremlin Palace	60 Years of Music Tour, with the Czech National Symphony Orchestra
23 November 2018	Paris	France	AccorHotels Arena	60 Years of Music Tour, with the Czech National Symphony Orchestra
24 November 2018	Brussels	Belgium	Palais 12	60 Years of Music Tour, with the Czech National Symphony Orchestra
26 November 2018	London	United Kingdom	The O_{2} Arena	60 Years of Music Tour, with the Czech National Symphony Orchestra
19 January 2019	Kraków	Poland	Tauron Arena Kraków	60 Years of Music Tour, with the Czech National Symphony Orchestra
21 January 2019	Berlin	Germany	Mercedes-Benz Arena	60 Years of Music Tour, with the Czech National Symphony Orchestra
23 January 2019	Budapest	Hungary	László Papp Budapest Sports Arena	60 Years of Music Tour, with the Czech National Symphony Orchestra
25 January 2019	Prague	Czech Republic	O_{2} Arena	60 Years of Music Tour, with the Czech National Symphony Orchestra
27 January 2019	Stockholm	Sweden	Ericsson Globe	60 Years of Music Tour, with the Czech National Symphony Orchestra
28 January 2019	Oslo	Norway	Telenor Arena	60 Years of Music Tour, with the Czech National Symphony Orchestra
13 February 2019	Antwerp	Belgium	Sportpaleis	60 Years of Music Tour, with the Czech National Symphony Orchestra
15 February 2019	Dublin	Ireland	3Arena	60 Years of Music Tour, with the Czech National Symphony Orchestra
4 May 2019	Baracaldo	Spain	Bizkaia Arena	60 Years of Music Tour, with the Czech National Symphony Orchestra
6 May 2019	Lisbon	Portugal	Altice Arena	60 Years of Music Tour, with the Czech National Symphony Orchestra
7-8 May 2019	Madrid	Spain	WiZink Center	60 Years of Music Tour, with the Czech National Symphony Orchestra
18-19 May 2019	Verona	Italy	Verona Arena	60 Years of Music Tour, with the Czech National Symphony Orchestra
15-16, 18-19, 21–23 June 2019	Rome	Italy	Baths of Caracalla	60 Years of Music Tour, with the Czech National Symphony Orchestra
28 June 2019	Mantua	Italy	Palazzo Te	60 Years of Music Tour, with the Czech National Symphony Orchestra
29 June 2019	Lucca	Italy	Walls of Lucca	60 Years of Music Tour, with the Czech National Symphony Orchestra
11 January 2020	Rome	Italy	Palazzo Madama	with the Orchestra Roma Sinfonietta
