= Tipos aréna =

Slovak sports arena, opened 1940

Ondrej Nepela Arena
- Zimný štadión Ondreja Nepelu
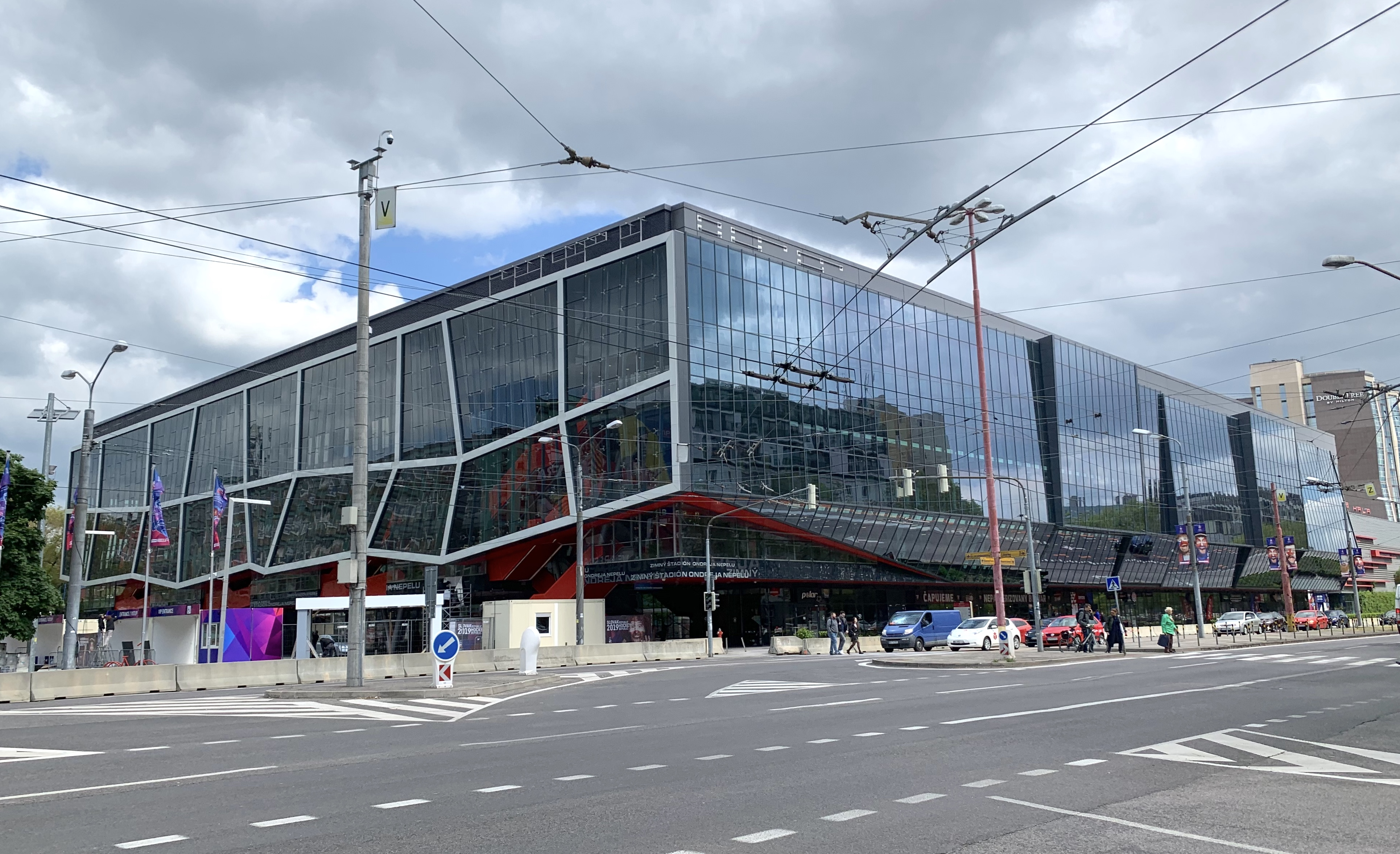
- Interactive map of Ondrej Nepela Arena
- Former names: ST Aréna (2004–2006); T-Com Aréna (2006–2007); Samsung Aréna (2007–2010, 2011); Orange Arena (2011); Slovnaft Arena
- Location: Odbojárov 9 Bratislava, Slovakia
- Coordinates: 48°09′36″N 17°08′10″E
- Owner: City of Bratislava
- Capacity: 10,055 (Ice hockey); 10,200 (concert)

Construction
- Groundbreaking: October 28, 1939
- Opened: December 14, 1940
- Renovated: 1948–1949; 1957; 1989–1992; 2018
- Rebuilt: 2009–2011
- Cost: Rebuild: $108 million ($163 million in 2025 dollars)
- Architects: Kamil Gross, Arnošt Adámek, Juraj Uhlíř and Horváth Eduard; Dušan Fischer (rebuild)
- Main contractor: Ingsteel (rebuild)

Tenants
- HC Slovan Bratislava (Slovak Extraliga) (1940 - present); Bratislava Capitals (ICEHL) (2019 - 2022)

The Ondrej Nepela Arena (Slovak: Zimný Štadión Ondreja Nepelu) (also known as Orange Arena during the 2011 IIHF Championship and later as Tipos Aréna, previously Slovnaft Arena, for sponsorship reasons) is an indoor arena in Bratislava, Slovakia. It is primarily used for ice hockey and it is the home arena of the HC Slovan Bratislava.

== History ==
=== Ice rink and original arena ===
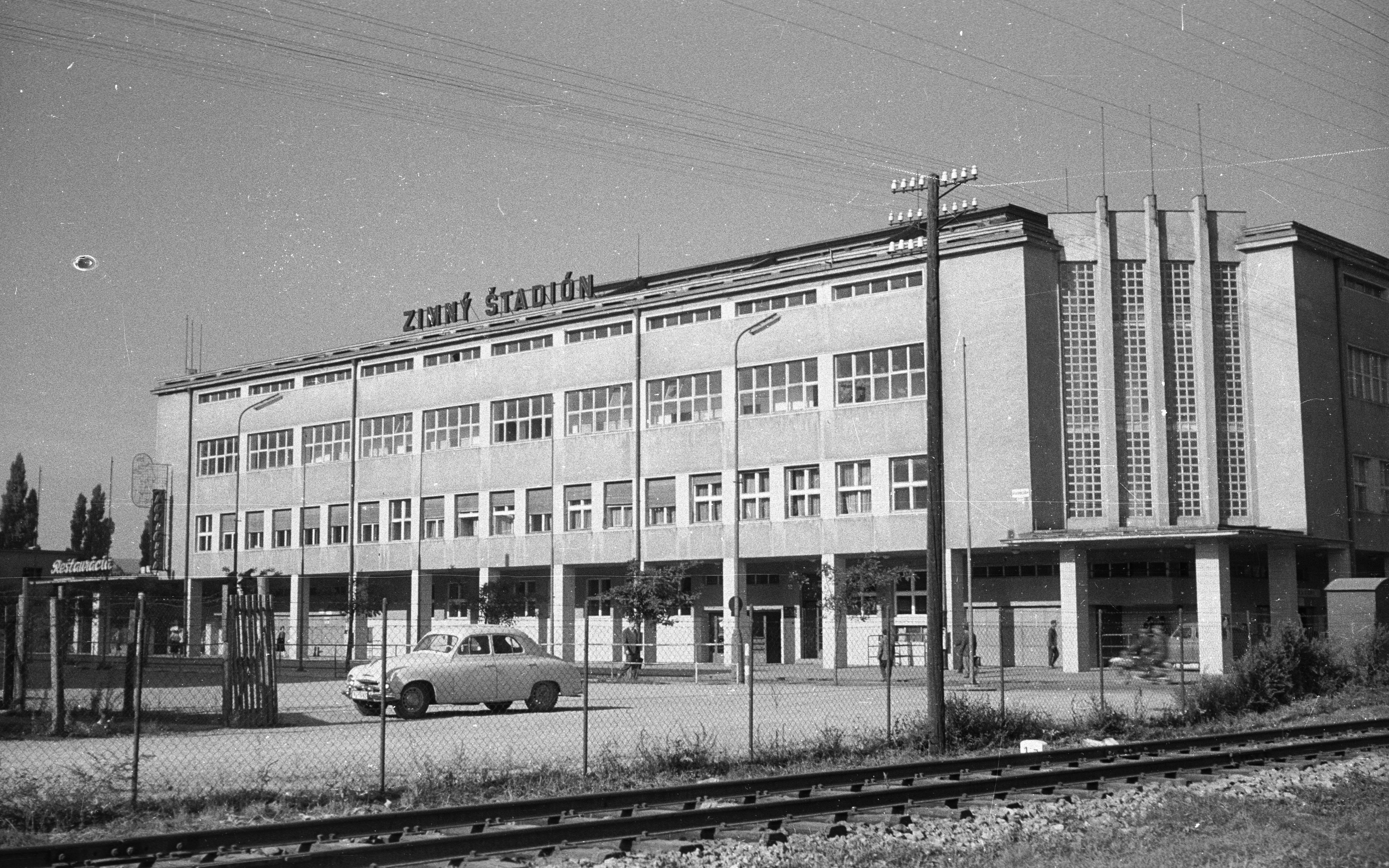
The, now indoor, arena in 1959; a roof was added in 1957

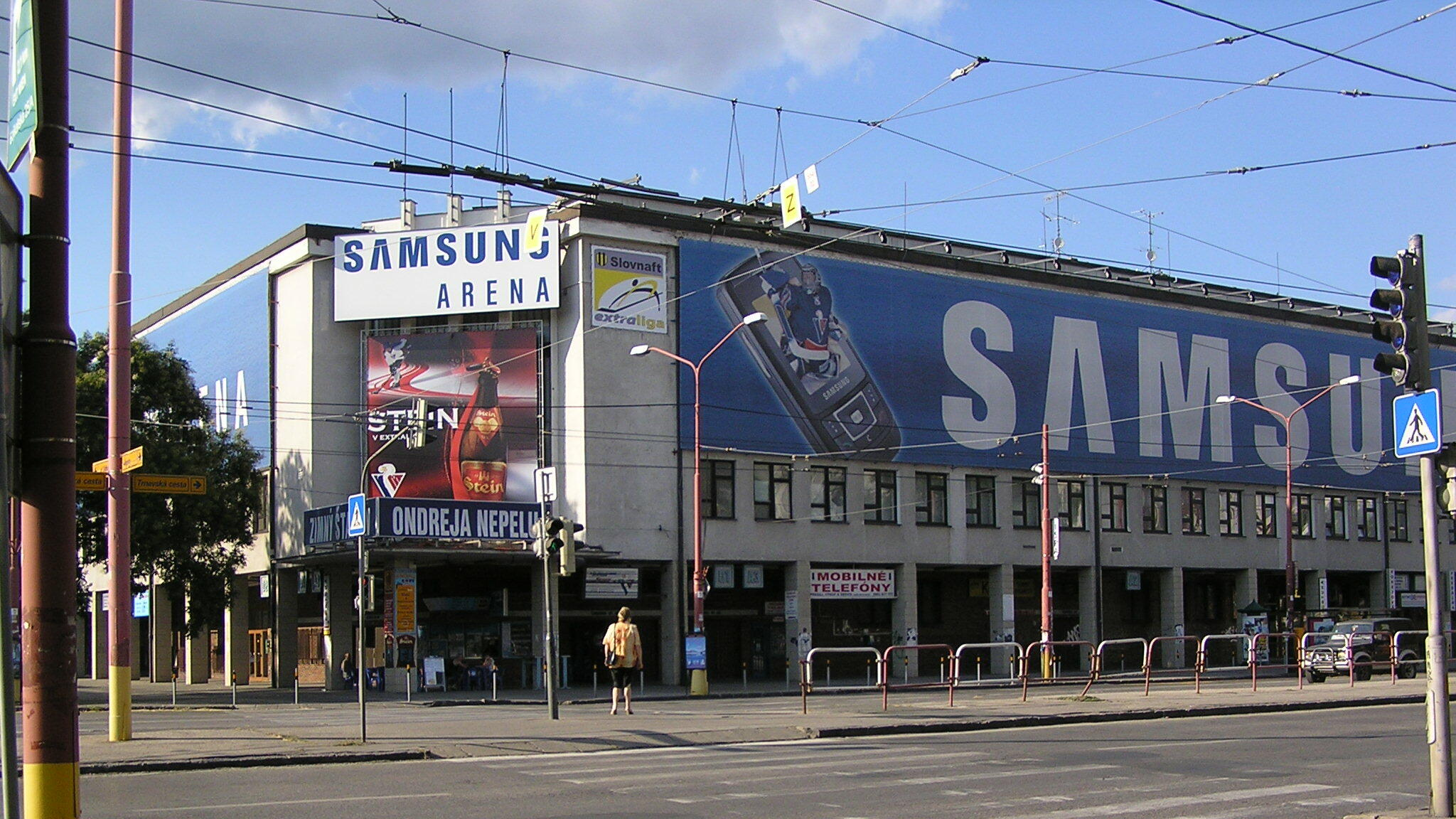
The old arena in August 2007, before reconstruction

The arena was first opened on 15 December 1940 as the first public artificial ice rink in Bratislava. The first official ice hockey game was played on 21 December of the same year. Between 1948 and 1949, new tribunes were built in order to increase the standing capacity from around 300 to 11,000. In 1957 the open-air venue was covered with a steel structure that required supporting columns, and 4,800 temporary seats were installed with the standing capacity reduced to 7,000.

Another significant renovation took place between 1989 and 1992, in time for hosting the 1992 Men's Ice Hockey World Championships, and following this the arena now had a total of 7,747 seats until its full reconstruction started in early 2009. This time the interior was changed significantly (new seats, locker rooms and technical equipment) and the arena received a new reinforced concrete roof.

Since 29 September 1995 the arena is named in honour of Ondrej Nepela, a Slovak figure skater who competed for Czechoslovakia in the late 1960s and early 1970s and who was the Men's figure skating champion at the 1972 Winter Olympics in Sapporo, Japan.

=== New modern arena ===
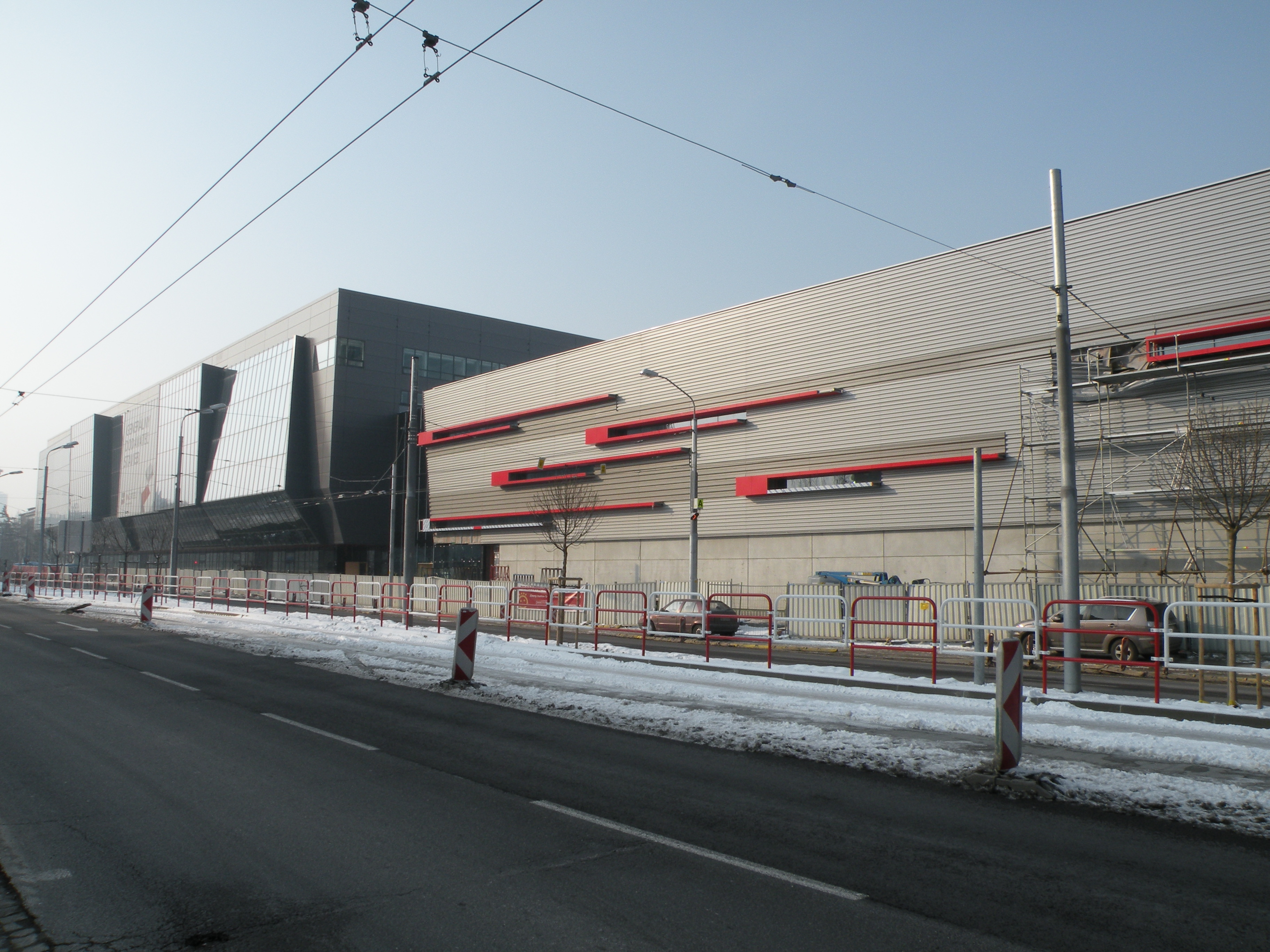
The new arena and practice rinks under construction (January 2011)

In the period from April 2009 to February 2011, the venue was almost entirely rebuilt and upgraded, in line with IIHF, Slovak, and international specifications and largely funded by the Slovak government, as part of preparations for hosting the 2011 IIHF World Championships. More than €87 million was spent to install a new steel roof, modernize facilities, build two new adjacent practice arenas, an underground car park and increase the seating capacity from 8,350 to 10,000. During the reconstruction phase, 80% of the original building was demolished and the resident ice hockey club HC Slovan Bratislava moved to the Vladimír Dzurilla Ice Stadium in the Ružinov borough of Bratislava.

The reconstructed arena opened in April 2011, with one of the most advanced game presentations, LED scoreboards, and security systems ever built. In addition to the arena, a new DoubleTree by Hilton hotel was built, which mainly served as the accommodation for the foreign teams and staff during the championships. Further improvements to the arena's facilities were carried out in 2018 to improve its ability to host the 2019 IIHF World Championship. The work included an upgraded refrigeration system, a refurbished ice rink with new boards and plexiglass, improved team dressing rooms and other areas, and technical upgrades.

== Notable events ==
=== Sport ===
An NHL pre-season game was held at the Samsung Arena between HC Slovan Bratislava and the Tampa Bay Lightning on September 30, 2008. Tampa Bay won 3–2 in overtime. On October 2, 2011, the arena hosted another NHL pre-season game, this time between HC Slovan Bratislava and New York Rangers who beat the home team 4–1.

An overview of some sport events held in the arena:

- 1958 European Figure Skating Championships
- 1959 IIHF World Championship
- 1966 European Figure Skating Championships
- 1973 World Figure Skating Championships
- 1981 FIBA European Championship

1990s

- 1992 IIHF World Championship
- 1995 IIHF World Championship Group B
- 1996 ISBHF Ball Hockey World Championship
- 1996 European Table Tennis Championships
- 1999 European Judo Championships

2000s

- 2001 European Figure Skating Championships
- 2008 IIHF Men's InLine Hockey World Championship

2010s

- 2011 IIHF World Championship
- 2011 ISBHF Ball Hockey World Championship
- 2016 European Figure Skating Championships
- 2016 Women's Youth World Handball Championship
- 2017 IIHF Inline Hockey World Championship
- 2017 Women's World Floorball Championships
- 2019 IIHF World Championship
- 2019 WUKF Karate World Championship
- 2019 Women's European Volleyball Championship

2020s

- Ice hockey at the 2022 Winter Olympics – Men's qualification group D
- 2022 European Men's Handball Championship
- 2026 European Women's Handball Championship
- 2029 IIHF World Championship

=== Music ===
An overview of some musical events from 2011 onwards
Date	Artists	Events
2011
June 29	Sting	Symphonicity Tour
November 6	Rammstein	Made in Germany 1995–2011 (tour)
November 13	Sade	Sade Live Tour
2012
July 10	Elton John	Greatest Hits Tour (Elton John)
December 20	José Carreras	The Singles Tour
2013
April 19	Beyoncé	The Mrs. Carter Show World Tour
May 9	Eros Ramazzotti	Noi World Tour
December 29	Andrea Bocelli	
2014
February 6	Depeche Mode	Delta Machine Tour
May 5	Peter Gabriel	Back To Front Tour
October 19	Kylie Minogue	Kiss Me Once Tour
2015
February 2	Ennio Morricone	My Life in Music Tour 2015
February 27	Katy Perry	Prismatic World Tour
April 18	Robbie Williams	Let Me Entertain You Tour
2016
January 19	Ennio Morricone	60 Years of Music Tour 2016
March 15	Eros Ramazzotti	Perfetto Tour
May 5	Hans Zimmer	
May 27	André Rieu	
November 9	Jean Michel Jarre	Electronica Tour
November 26	Piotr Rubik	
December 16	José Carreras	
2017
May 11	Vanessa Mae	
June 2	Hans Zimmer	
November 19	Andrea Bocelli	
2018
January 13	Piotr Rubik	
August 31	Thirty Seconds to Mars	Monolith Tour
2019
June 30	Sting	Sting: My Songs Tour
October 5	Eros Ramazzotti	Vita Ce N'è Tour
October 31	Enrique Iglesias	All The Hits Live (Enrique Iglesias)
November 20	Scorpions	Crazy World Tour
2020
February 16	Hans Zimmer	The World of Hans Zimmer
February 26	Maluma	Maluma World Tour
2021
November 18	André Rieu	
2022
March 3	Hans Zimmer	
May 7	OneRepublic	
August 3	Slipknot	We Are Not Your Kind

== Transport ==
Ondrej Nepela Arena is located in the third district of Bratislava, Slovakia. The arena can be approached by tram, trolleybus and bus.

Service	Stop	Line
Bus	Zimný Štadión	39, 53, 63, 78, 163
Trolleybus	Zimný Štadión	47, 60, 61
Tram	Česká	4

Service	Stop	Line
Night bus	Zimný Štadión	N74
Night bus	Česká	N53

Drivers can park directly under the arena. There are place for 365 cars. An additional 1,300 parking spaces offer the Central Shopping Center, which is approximately 400 m away from the arena. Next 994 parking spaces are under the Tehelné pole, which is 300 m away.

== Image gallery ==
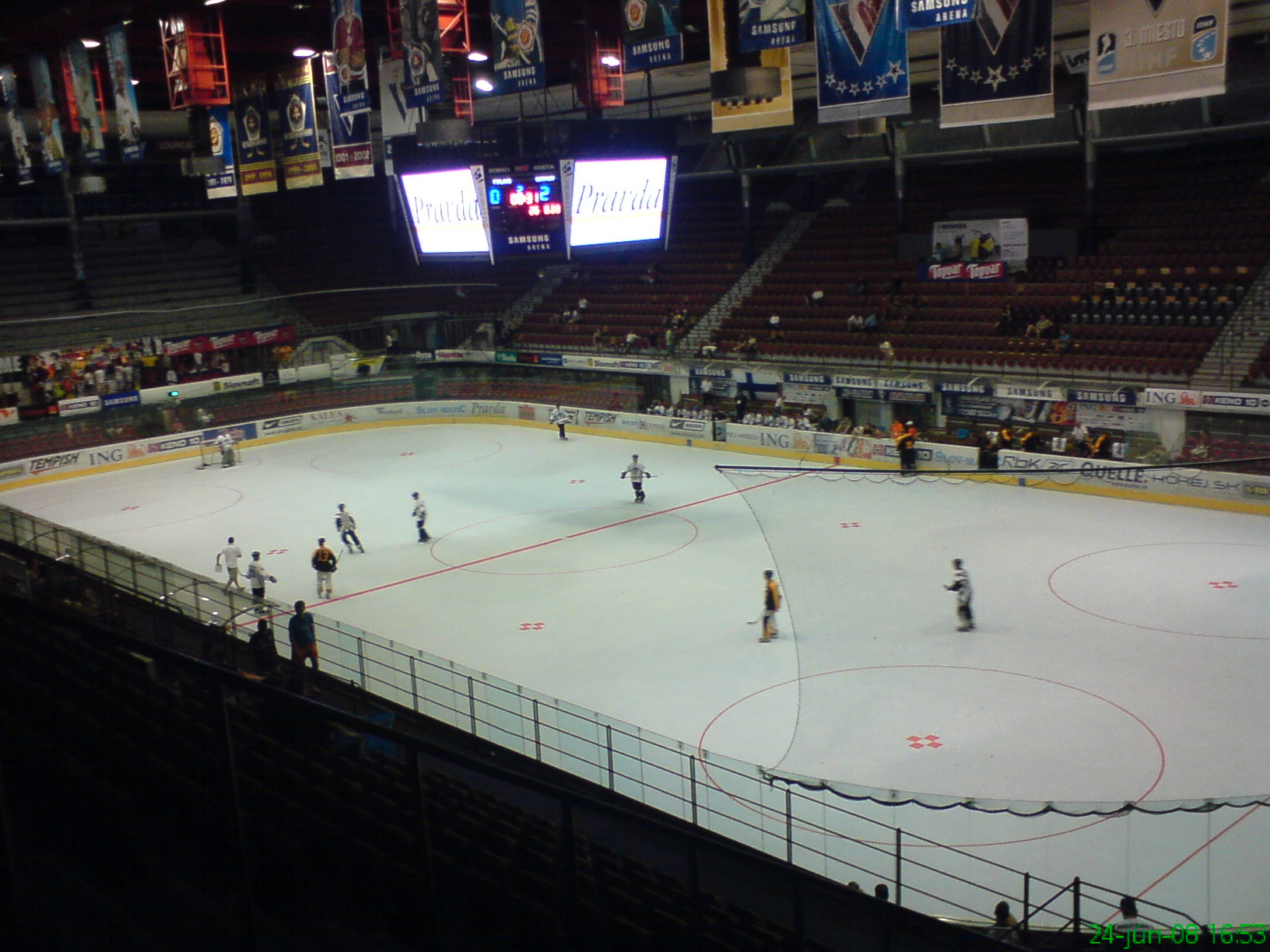
2008 IIHF Inline Hockey World Championship

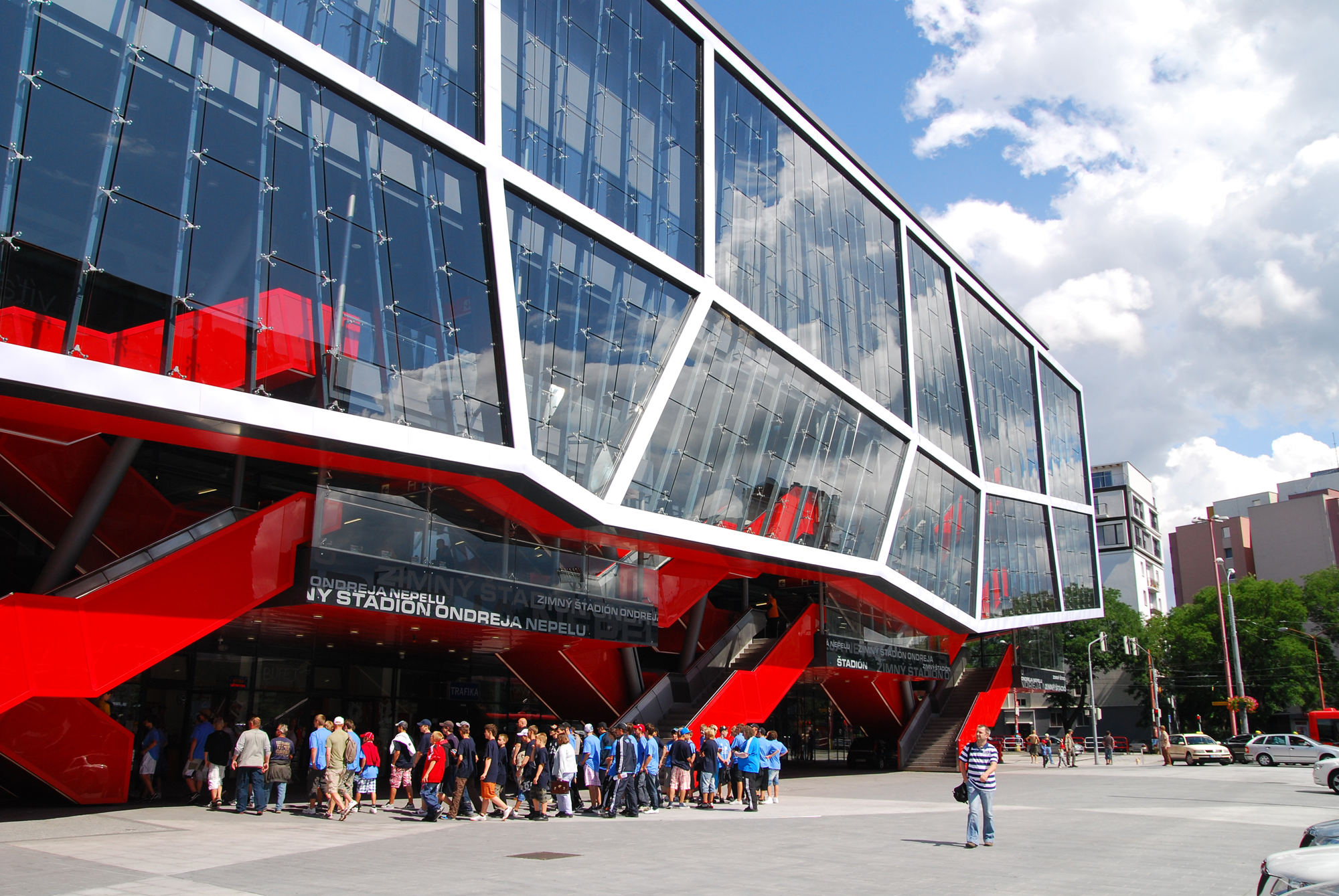
The main entrance after reconstruction in June 2011

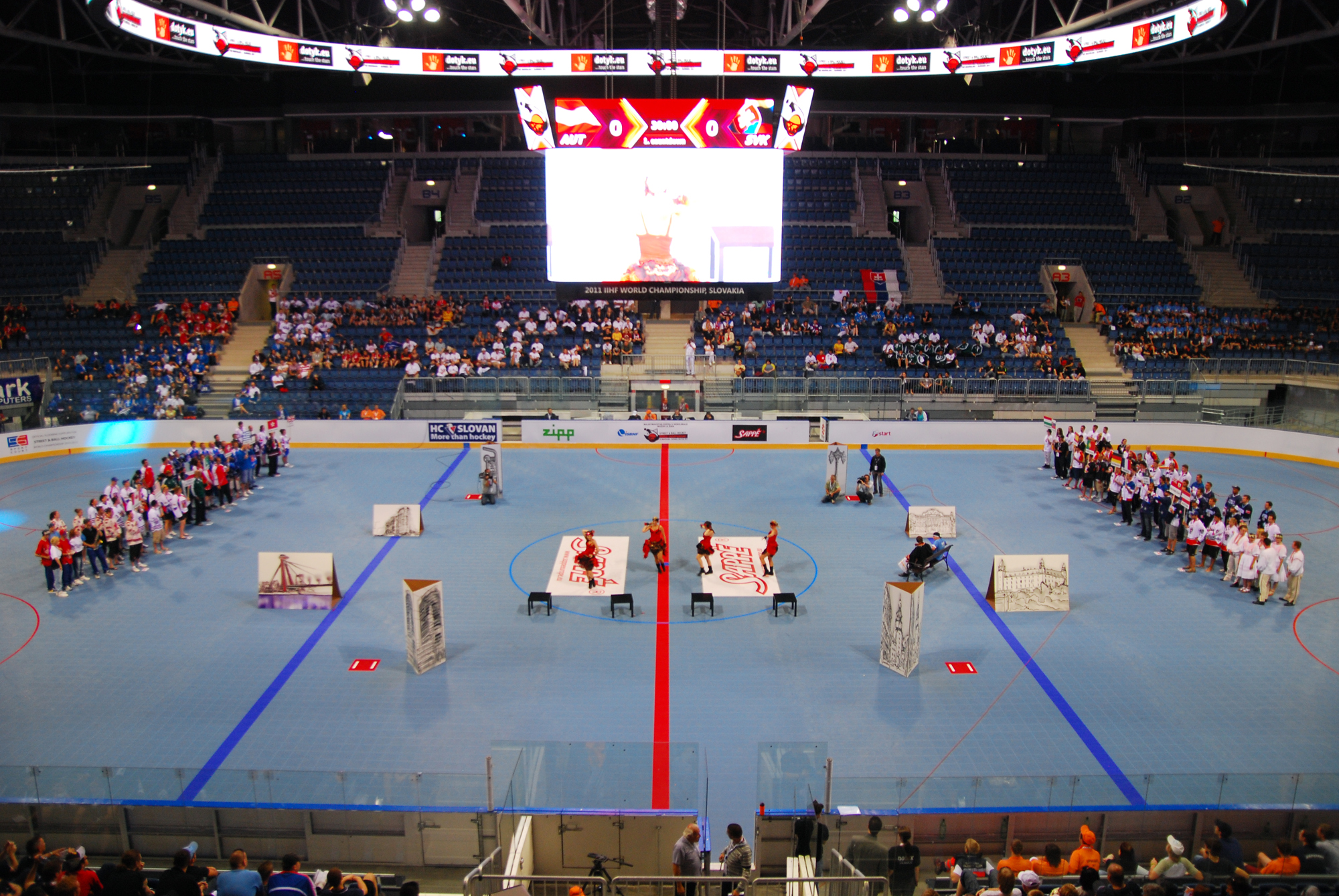
2011 Ball Hockey World Championship

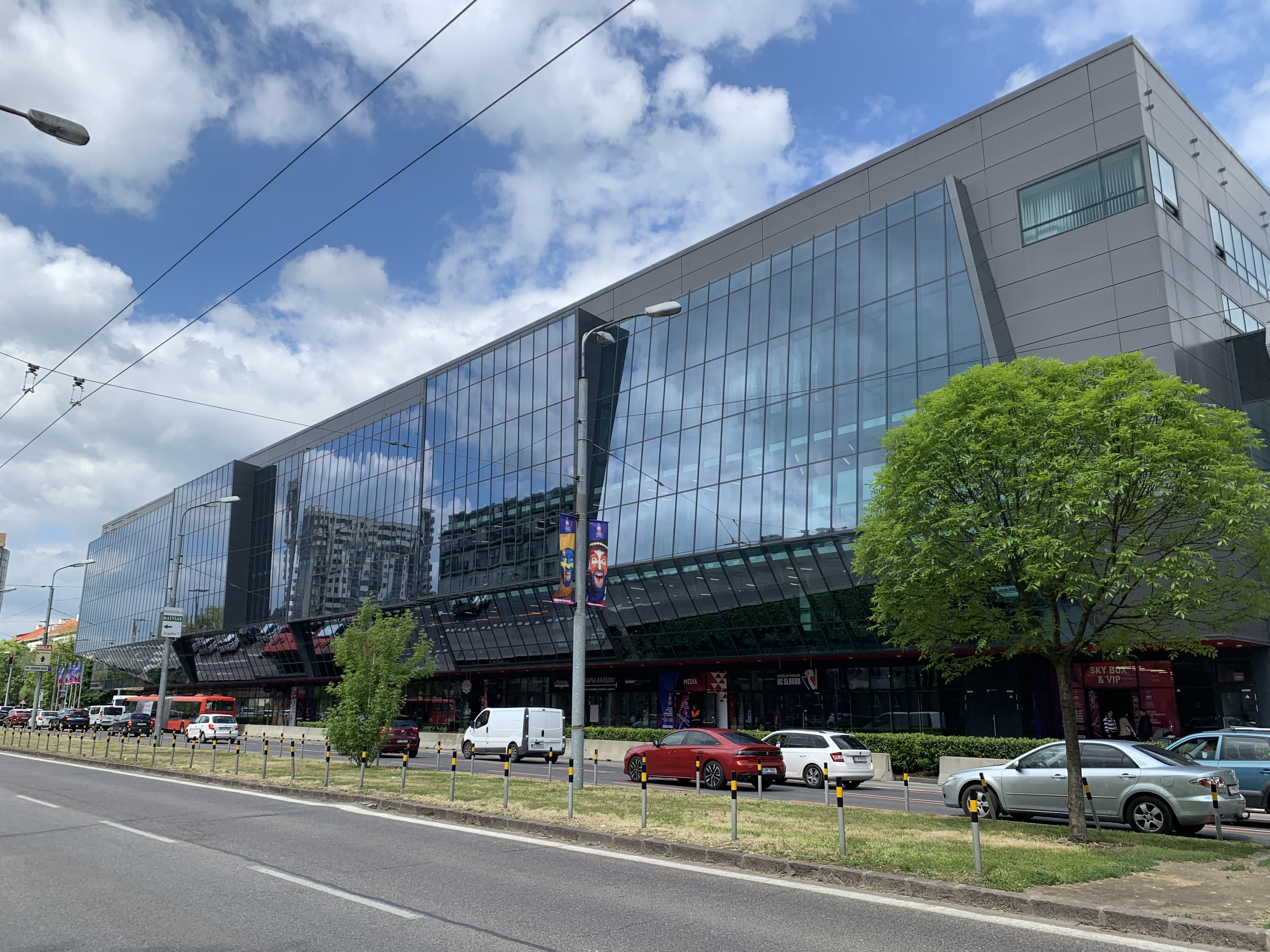
Exterior during the 2019 IIHF World Championship

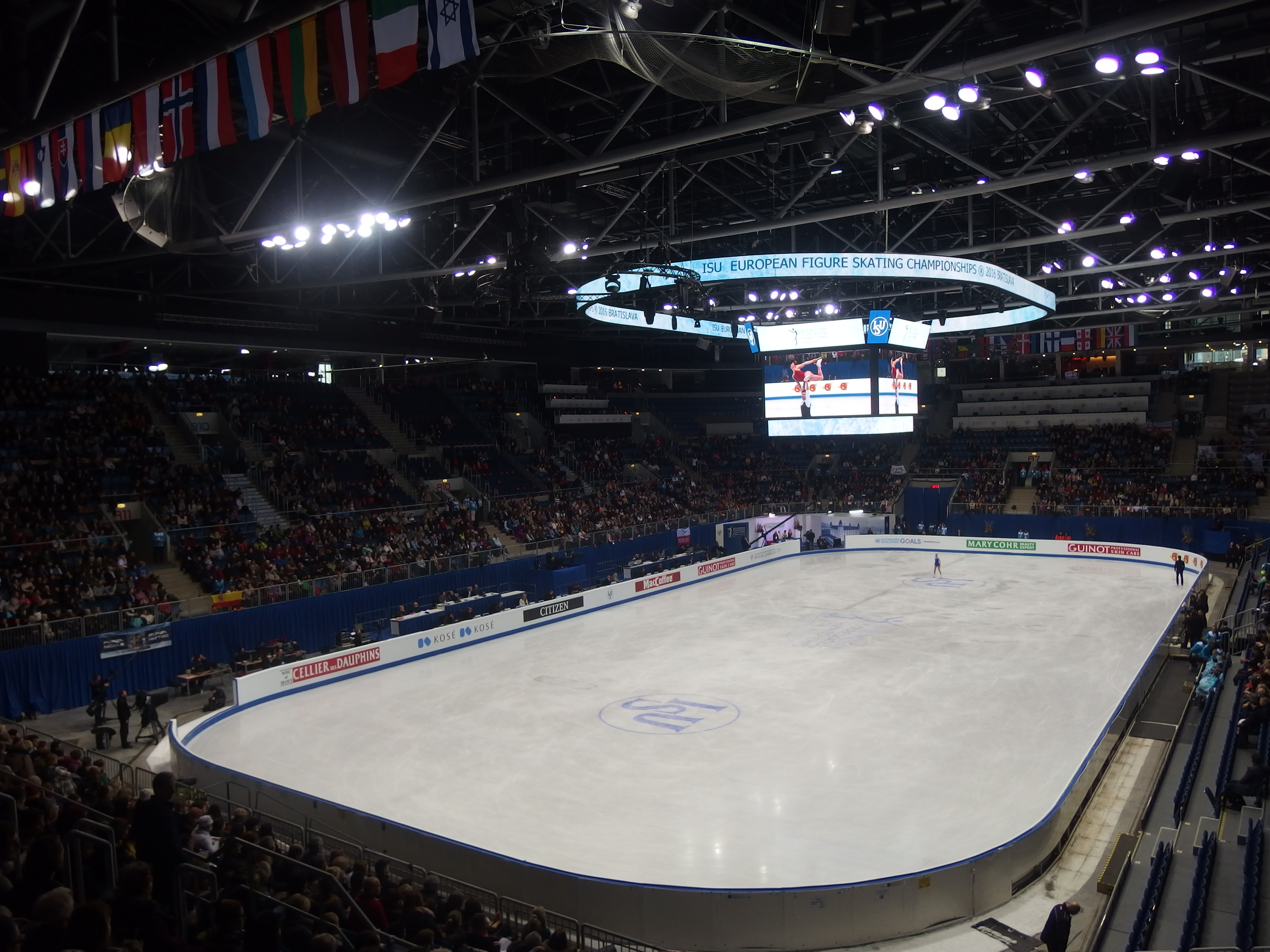
2016 European Figure Skating Championships

== See also ==
- List of indoor arenas in Slovakia
- List of European ice hockey arenas
