= Zvolen Ice Stadium =

Venue used for ice-hockey in Slovakia

- Zimný štadión Zvolen
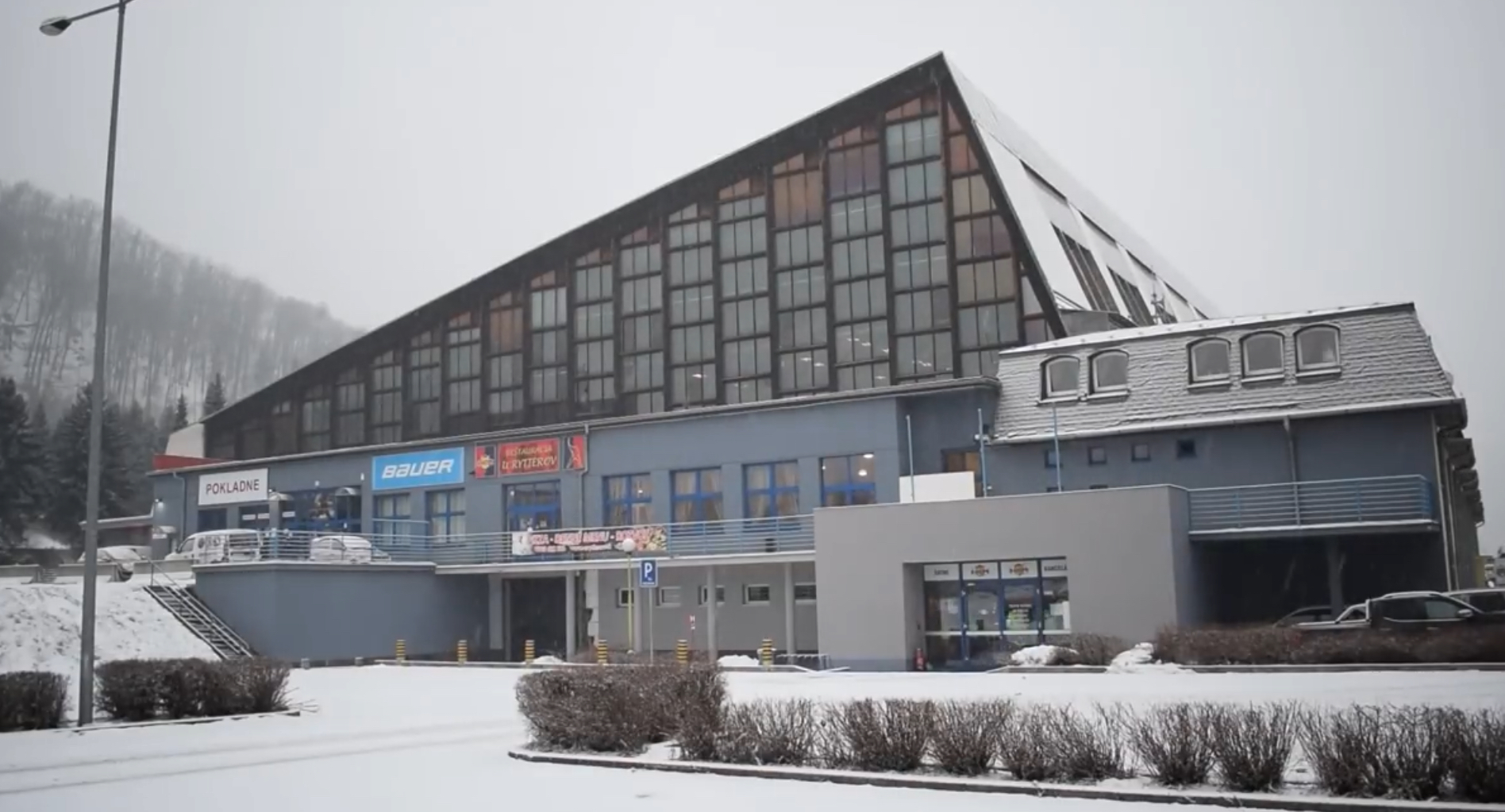
- Interactive map of Zvolen Ice Stadium
- Former names: Steiger aréna
- Address: Zvolen; Slovakia
- Operator: City of Zvolen
- Capacity: 5,345 (3,195 seats)

Construction
- Opened: 1969
- Rebuilt: 1976

Zvolen Ice Stadium (Slovak: Zimný štadión Zvolen) is an ice stadium in the city of Zvolen. The stadium has a capacity of 5,345, with 3,195 seats. It is the home stand of the hockey club HKM Zvolen, which leases the stadium from the city of Zvolen.

The decisive final match in the 2012/13 season attracted 6,104 spectators.

== History ==
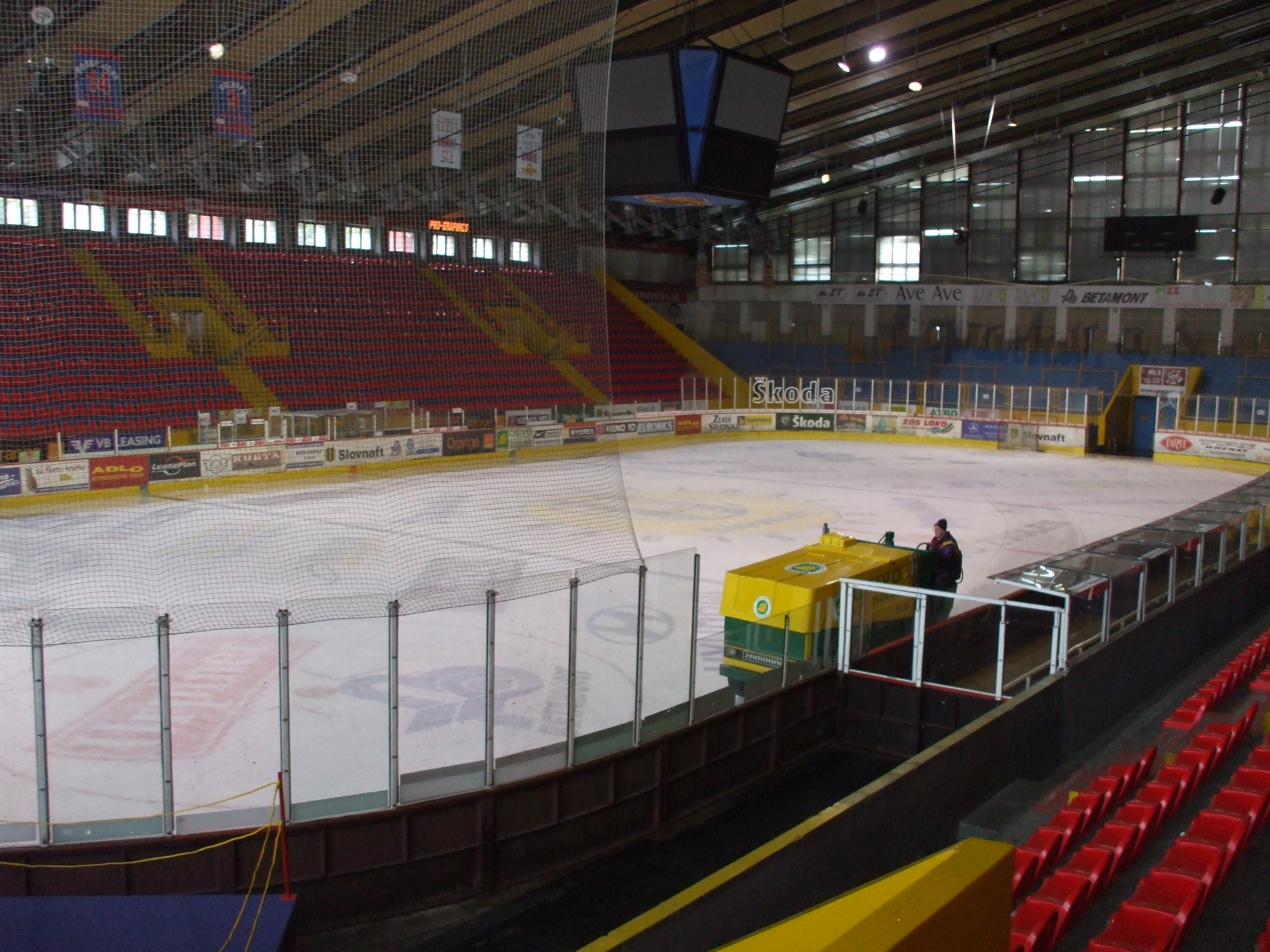
Inside the stadium

It was opened in 1969 when the ice rink and engine room were built. In the following seven years, the stadium was roofed over. In the 1980s, a training hall was built.

In 2018, the stadium was renovated, with 300,000 euros being contributed from the Slovak Ice Hockey Association. A further 200,000 euros were invested by the city. In 2024, the stadium was renamed Tiposbet Arena Zvolen following the club's new partnership with bookmaker company Tipos. In 2025, after HKM Zvolen terminated the contract for the winter stadium lease, the venue was transferred to the city administration. On 4 February 2026, there was an ammonia leak coming from the stadium. According to officials, the leak came from the main cooling tank. All roads leading to the stadium were closed and employees of nearby companies or residents had to be evacuated.

== Competitions ==
The international senior tournament, the Pavel Zábojník Memorial, has been held in Zvolen every August since 1999. So far, the event has hosted teams from 11 countries (Belarus, the Czech Republic, France, Hungary, Germany, Poland, Austria, Romania, Russia, Slovenia and Ukraine) and, in 2012, the KHL club Donbass Donetsk.

== See also ==
- List of indoor arenas in Slovakia
