= Kežmarok Ice Stadium =

Coordinates: 49°8′9″N 20°26′0″E

Winter Sports Stadium Kežmarok is an arena in Kežmarok, Slovakia. It is primarily used for ice hockey and is the home arena of MHK Kežmarok of the Slovak Extraliga. It has a capacity of 3,000 people and opened in 1994. The Phoenix Coyotes played a friendly match in July 1998 against MHK Kežmarok in Winter Sports Stadium Kežmarok.
