= LNBP All-Star Game =

Annual basketball event in Mexico

- Status: Active
- Frequency: Annually
- Inaugurated: 2000
- Most recent: 2022
- Organizer: LNBP

The LNBP All-Star Game is an annual basketball event in Mexico, organised by the Liga Nacional de Baloncesto Profesional (LNBP), one of the country's major basketball leagues. It was launched in 2000. Former NBA players such as Gustavo Ayón, Jamario Moon, and Horacio Llamas have featured in the event.

== History ==
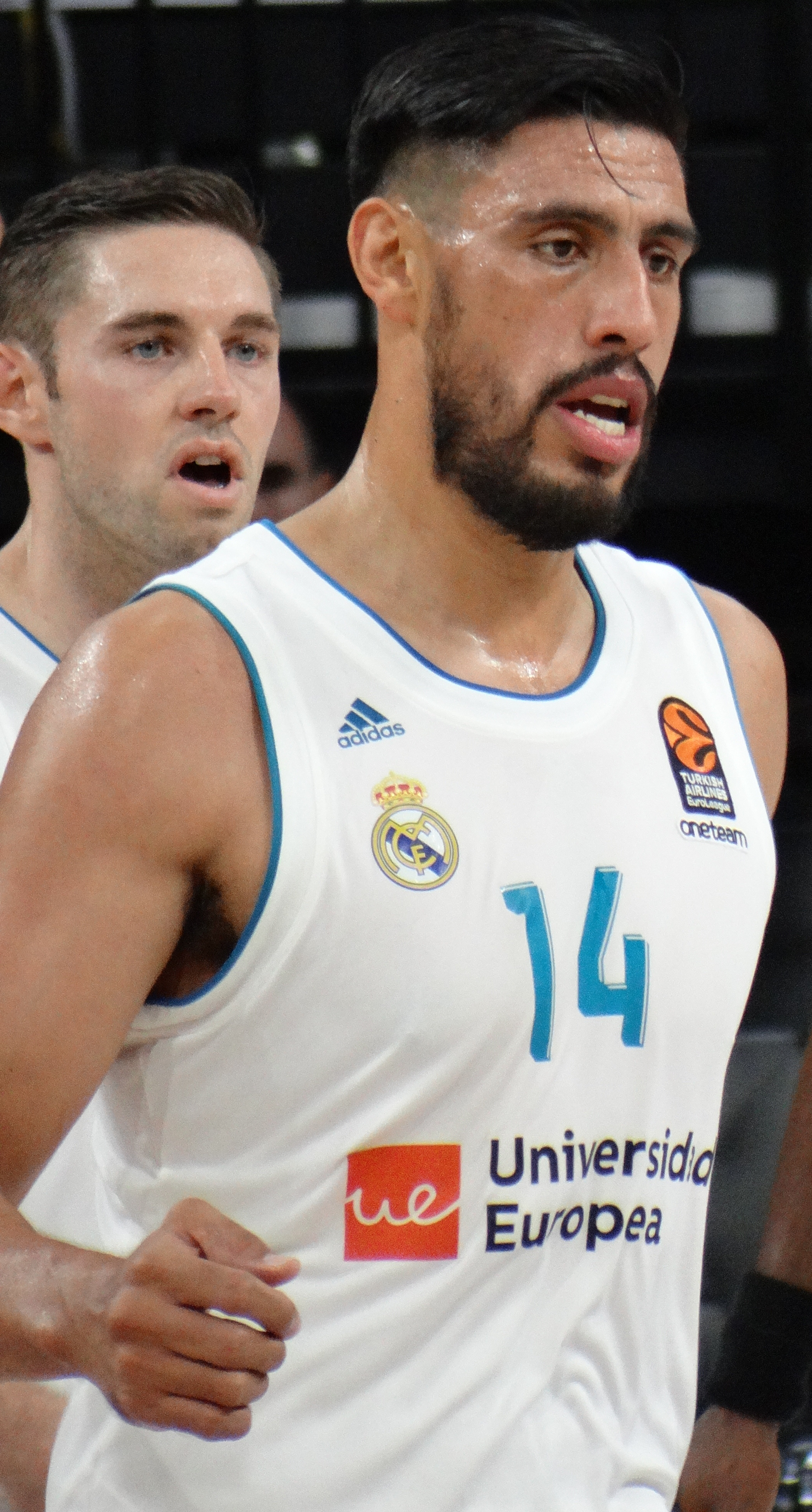
Former NBA player Gustavo Ayón featured in the 2008 All-Star Game.

Along with the Circuito Mexicano de Básquetbol (CIMEBA), which as founded in 1970, a second major basketfall league was founded in 2000 called the LNBP, and it immediately launched its own All-Star Game. The first All-Star Game organised by LNBP, was played in Ciudad Victoria on October 19, 2000, at 20:30, and was broadcast by ESPN2. The game was played between a selection of Mexican players (Mexicanos) and a selection of foreign players (Extranjeros). It was LNBP's first season.

From 2000 until 2005, the game was played between a team of foreign players, and a team of Mexican players. The format was changed in 2006. The game became Zona Norte (North ) vs. Zona Sur (South), with no distinction between foreign and Mexican players. The 2009-10 All-Star Game was suspended, just as like the 2020 and 2021 editions due to COVID-19.

2017 marked the 20th edition of the event.

== List of games ==
Bold: Team that won the game.

Edition	Season	Date	Venue	Team 1	Score	Team 2	MVP	Club
I	2000	October 19, 2000	Gimnasio Multidisciplinario of Autonomous University of Tamaulipas	**Mexicanos**	**104**-98	Extranjeros	(Mexico) José Escobedo	Indios de la UACJ
II	2001 (I)	Auditorio Municipal de Torreón	Torreón	**Mexicanos**	**119**-116	Extranjeros		
III	2001 (II)		Polideportivo Carlos Martínez Balmori. Pachuca	**Mexicanos**	**134**-109	Extranjeros		
IV	2002 (I)	September 15, 2002		**Mexicanos**	**123**-98	Extranjeros		
IV	2002 (II)	October 12, 2002	Gimnasio Olímpico Juan de la Barrera, Mexico City	**Mexicanos**	**102**-88	Extranjeros		
VI	2003 (I)	September 21, 2003	Gimnasio Fresnillo Solidaridad, Fresnillo	Mexicanos	112-**134**	**Extranjeros**		
VII	2003 (II)		Matamoros	Mexicanos	90-**117**	**Extranjeros**	(United States) Tyrone Mc Daniel	Correcaminos UAT
VIII	2004	August 31, 2004	Auditorio Miguel Barragán, San Luis Potosí	**Mexicanos**	**111**-106	Extranjeros		
IX	2005	September 15, 2005	Auditorio Benito Juárez, Veracruz	Mexicanos	96-**105**	**Extranjeros**	(United States) Myron Demond Allen	Lobos Grises de la UAD
X	2006	September 19, 2006	Gimnasio Polifuncional, Mérida, Yucatán	**North**	**122** -104	South	(United States) Galen Robinson	Correcaminos UAT Reynosa
XI	2007	December 10, 2007	Gimnasio Multidisciplinario Nuevo Laredo, Nuevo Laredo	**North**	**123** -113	South	(United States) Leroy Hickerson	Galgos de Tijuana
XII	2008	December 16, 2008	Gimnasio Olímpico Juan de la Barrera , Mexico City	North	122-**123**	**South**	(United States) Leroy Hickerson	Halcones UV Xalapa
XII	2010–11		Gimnasio Olímpico Juan de la Barrera , Mexico City				(United States) Letheal Cook	Algodoneros de la Comarca
XIV	2011-12	January 9, 2012	Gimnasio USBI, Xalapa	**Mexicanos**	**142**-136	Extranjeros	(United States) Leroy Hickerson	Pioneros de Quintana Roo
XV	2012-13	November 16, 2012	Expo Tampico, Tampico	Mexicanos	101-**108**	**Extranjeros**	(United States) Leroy Hickerson (4)	Halcones UV Xalapa
XVI	2013–14		Gimnasio del ITESM, Atizapán de Zaragoza				(Mexico) Alejandro Carmona Sánchez	Panteras de Aguascalientes
XVII	2015 (es)	February 8, 2015	Gimnasio Nuevo León Unido, Monterrey	**Mexicanos**	**124**-120	Extranjeros	(Mexico) P. J. Reyes	Fuerza Regia de Monterrey
XVIII	2016 (es)	February 16, 2016	Gimnasio Nuevo León Unido, Monterrey	**Mexicanos**	**131**-129	Extranjeros	(Mexico) Edgar Garibay	Gigantes del Estado de México
XIX	2016-17 (es)	December 6, 2016	Gimnasio Olímpico Juan de la Barrera , Mexico City	**Mexicanos**	**110**-99	Extranjeros	(United States) Juan Toscano-Anderson	Fuerza Regia de Monterrey
XX	2017	December 3, 2017	Domo de la Feria, León	**Mexicanos**	**163**-136	Extranjeros	(United States) Juan Toscano-Anderson (2)	Fuerza Regia de Monterrey
XXI	2018 (es)	December 9, 2018	Auditorio de Usos Múltiples de la UMSNH, Morelia	**North**	**134**-121	South	(United States) Wendell McKines	Mineros de Zacatecas
XXII	2019 (es)	November 17, 2019		**West**	**129**-117	East	(United States) Derek Reese	Panteras de Aguascalientes
XXIII	2022	28 August 2022	Arena Astros, Guadalajara, Jalisco	**Punto CHG**	**153**-138	Molten	(United States) Brooks DeBisschop	Astros de Jalisco

== Slam-Dunk winners ==
Year	Player	Team
2001 (I)	(United States) Antonio Rivers	Fuerza Regia de Monterrey
2001 (II)	(United States) Samuel Leon Bowie	Gallos de Pelea de Ciudad Juárez
2002	(United States) Gerald Damon Williams	Fuerza Regia de Monterrey
2003 (I)	(United States) Antonio Rivers	Fuerza Regia de Monterrey
2003 (II)	(United States) Antonio Rivers (3)	Fuerza Regia de Monterrey
2004	(United States) Jamaal Andre Thomas	Santos Reales
2005	(United States) Jamaal Andre Thomas	Fuerza Regia de Monterrey
2006	(United States) Jamaal Andre Thomas (3)	Santos Reales
2007	(United States) LeRoy Hickerson	Galgos de Tijuana
2008	(United States) LeRoy Hickerson	Halcones UV Xalapa
2010-11	(United States) Jeremis Stephon Smith	Fuerza Regia de Monterrey
2011-12	(United States) LeRoy Hickerson (3)	Pioneros de Quintana Roo
2012-13	(United States) Marcus Morrison	Huracanes de Tampico
2013-14	(United States) Jerome Anthony Habel	Gigantes del Estado de México
2015	(Mexico) Paul John Hernández Reyes	Fuerza Regia de Monterrey
2016	(United States) Christopher Cayole	Santos del Potosí
2016-17	(Cuba) Ismael Romero	Panteras de Aguascalientes
2017	(United States) Juan Toscano-Anderson	Fuerza Regia de Monterrey
2018	(United States) Mychal Ammons	Laguneros de La Comarca
2019	(Mexico) Manny Hernandez	Aguacateros de Michoacán
2022	(Mexico) Manny Hernandez (2)	Aguacateros de Michoacán

== Three-Point Shoot Contest ==
Year	Player	Team
2001 (II)	(Mexico) Gerald Damon Williams	Fuerza Regia de Monterrey
2003 (I)	(Mexico) Luis Eduardo Liñán Carrillo	Correcaminos UAT Matamoros
2003 (II)	(Mexico) Miguel Acua	Zorros de Morelia
2004	(Mexico) Víctor Mariscal	Lobos de la U.A. de C.
2005	(Mexico) Miguel Alejandro Acuña Andrews	Tecolotes de la UAG
2006	(Mexico) Miguel Alejandro Acuña Andrews (2)	Lobos Grises de la UAD
2007	(Mexico) Raymundo Castillo	Halcones UV Xalapa
2008	(Mexico) Raymundo Castillo (2)	Halcones UV Xalapa
2010-11	(United States) (Mexico) Orlando Méndez-Valdez	Halcones UV Xalapa
2011-12	(United States) (Mexico) Paul Stoll	Halcones Rojos Veracruz
2012-13	(United States) (Mexico) Orlando Méndez-Valdez	Halcones UV Xalapa
2013-14	(Mexico) Jesús Alberto González Martínez	Halcones UV Xalapa
2015	(Mexico) Román Martínez	Soles de Mexicali
2016	(United States) (Mexico) Orlando Méndez-Valdez (3)	Pioneros de Quintana Roo
2016-17	(United States) (Mexico) Justin Ávalos	Indios de la UACJ
2017	(United States) Steven Pledger II	Abejas de León
2018	(United States) (Mexico) Lucas Wayne Martínez Counts	Soles de Mexicali
2019	(Mexico) Moisés Andriassi	Soles de Mexicali
2022	(United States) Gary Ricks	Panteras de Aguascalientes

== Topscorers ==
Year	Player	Points	Team
2003 (II)	(United States) Tyrone Mc Daniel	19	Correcaminos UAT
2008	(United States) Blake Walker	33	Algodoneros de la Comarca
2011-12	(United States) LeRoy Hickerson	34	Pioneros de Quintana Roo
2012-13	(United States) Rodney Alexander	19	Correcaminos UAT
2015	(United States) Eugene Phelps	30	Fuerza Regia de Monterrey
2019	(United States) Derek Reese	31	Panteras de Aguascalientes
2022	(United States) Jordan Loveridge	25	

== Players with most selections (2000-present) ==
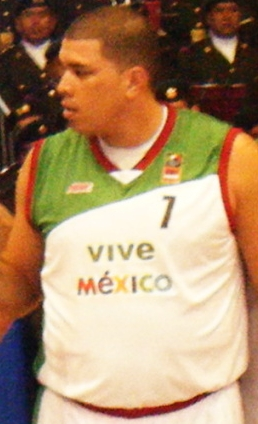
Former NBA player Horacio Llamas featured in both LNBP and CIMEBA All-Star Games.

Player	All-Star	Editions	Notes
(Mexico) Omar Quintero	7	2001, 2002, 2003 (I), 2004, 2005, 2006, 2015	
(Mexico) Horacio Llamas	5	2004, 2005, 2006, 2007, 2008	
(Mexico) Víctor Mariscal	5	2000, 2001 (I), 2003 (I), 2005, 2016	
(Mexico) Omar López	4	2002, 2003, 2004, 2005	
(United States) Antonio Rivers	4	2001, 2003 (I), 2004, 2005	
(Mexico) Víctor Ávila	4	2004, 2005, 2006, 2008	
(United States) Leroy Hickerson	4	2007, 2008, 2012 (I), 2012 (II)	4x MVP
(Mexico) Román Martínez	4	2012 (II), 2015, 2016, 2017	
(United States) Reggie Jordan	4	2003 (I), 2004, 2005, 2006	
(Mexico) Enrique Zúñiga	3	2005, 2006, 2007	
(Mexico) Alonso Izaguirre	3	2003, 2004 (I), 2007	
(Senegal) Boubacar Aw	3	2004, 2005, 2006	
(United States) Devon Ford	3	2006, 2007, 2008	
(United States) Romel Beck	3	2006, 2015, 2016	
(United States) (Mexico) Juan Toscano-Anderson	2	2017, 2018	2x MVP
(Mexico) Florentino Chávez	2	2000, 2001	
(Cuba) Ismael Romero	2	2016, 2018	
(United States) Greg Lewis	2	2006, 2008	

== CIMEBA All-Star Games ==
CIMEBA, Mexico's first and oldest major basketball league, started holding out annual All-Star Games. The 1987 edition took place in Chihuahua City and the 1988 in Aguascalientes with a selection team consisting of: Norberto Mena, Luis "Chango" Lopez, Rico Pontvianne, Anthony Vahn, Larry Connors, Jorge León, Rafael Olguin, Byron Tockarchock, Gordon Betancourt, Billy Bailey and Leonard Mitchell. The 1989 edition was held in Guadalajara at the court of the Leones Negros UdeG, with the South selection including players like Toño Reyes, Quique Ortega, Bucky Chavez and Andy Olivares.

In November 1999 a selection of CIMEBA players named "CIMEBA All-Stars" toured the United States and played games against NCAA Division I college teams such as Illinois, Michigan State, Minnesota, Ohio, and Purdue.

The 2001 All-Star Game was held on 7 October and the Team Mexico beat the Foreign stars with 145–133. Chris Walters (Zacatecas) was the Foreigners MVP, while Oscar Castellanos was named the Mexican team MVP. Willie Sublet (Santos del Potosí) won the dunk contest, and Jesus Ortiz (Mineros de Zacatecas) won the 3-point shootout.

The 2002 All-Star Game was held in Tuxtla Gutiérrez in a Mexicans against Americans format. The Mexican selection coached by Arturo Guerrero were: Omar Lopez, Manuel Cerecedo, Rodrigo Pérez, Victor Avila, Horacio Llamas, Espartaco Rios, Mauricio Ramos, Francisco Martinez, Florentino Ovando, Edwin Sanchez, Omar Quintero, Diablo Castellanos and Enrique Zuñiga. Legendary Arturo Guerrero was selected again as coach for the 2004 edition. CIMEBA folded after the 2006–07 season as Liga Nacional de Baloncesto Profesional and Circuito de Baloncesto de la Costa del Pacífico emerged as Mexico's major basketball leagues.

== See also ==
- Liga Nacional de Baloncesto Profesional
- CIBACOPA All-Star Game
