= 2011–12 LNBP season =

- Season: 12
- Dates: August 30, 2011 – February 13, 2012
- Teams: 14

Finals
- Champions: Halcones Rojos Veracruz
- Runners-up: Toros de Nuevo Laredo

Statistical leaders
Points	(United States) Daryl Dorsey	762
Rebounds	(The Bahamas) Ryan Moss	365
Assists	(United States) Will Funn	235
Efficiency	(The Bahamas) Ryan Moss	819

The 2011–12 LNBP was the 12th season of the Liga Nacional de Baloncesto Profesional, one of the professional basketball leagues of Mexico. It started on August 30, 2011, and ended on February 13, 2012. The league title was won by Halcones Rojos Veracruz, which defeated Toros de Nuevo Laredo in the championship series, 4–1.

== Format ==
14 teams participate. All the teams played against each other and the standings included all 14 teams with no separation in groups. The first 12 teams qualify for the playoffs. The group playoffs have a first round (best-of-5), a second round (best-of-5), semifinals (best-of-7) and finals (best-of-7).

== Teams ==
Team	City	State	Joined	Season No.
Abejas de Guanajuato	Guanajuato City	Guanajuato	2009–10	3
Águilas Rojas de San Juan del Río	San Juan del Río	Querétaro	2011–12	1
Barreteros de Zacatecas	Zacatecas City	Zacatecas	2003	7
Correcaminos UAT Victoria	Ciudad Victoria	Tamaulipas	2000	11
Fuerza Regia de Monterrey	Monterrey	Nuevo León	2001	11
Halcones Rojos Veracruz	Veracruz	Veracruz	2005	7
Halcones UV Xalapa	Xalapa	Veracruz	2003	9
Huracanes de Tampico	Tampico	Tamaulipas	2009–10	3
Lechugueros de León	León	Guanajuato	2004	8
Panteras de Aguascalientes	Aguascalientes City	Aguascalientes	2003	9
Pioneros de Quintana Roo	Cancún	Quintana Roo	2006	6
Soles de Mexicali	Mexicali	Baja California	2005	7
Toros de Nuevo Laredo	Nuevo Laredo	Tamaulipas	2007–08	5
Volcanes del Estado de México	Toluca	State of Mexico	2010–11	2

== Regular season ==
=== Standings ===
Pos	Team	Pld	W	L	PF	PA	PD	Pts	Qualification
1	Halcones Rojos Veracruz	40	34	6	3252	2745	+507	74	2012 LNBP playoffs
2	Fuerza Regia de Monterrey	40	32	8	3587	3163	+424	72	2012 LNBP playoffs
3	Toros de Nuevo Laredo	40	28	12	3415	3159	+256	68	2012 LNBP playoffs
4	Pioneros de Quintana Roo	40	27	13	3727	3319	+408	67	2012 LNBP playoffs
5	Soles de Mexicali	40	27	13	3386	3077	+309	67	2012 LNBP playoffs
6	Halcones UV Xalapa	40	26	14	3544	3150	+394	66	2012 LNBP playoffs
7	Huracanes de Tampico	40	25	15	3437	3131	+306	65	2012 LNBP playoffs
8	Barreteros de Zacatecas	40	17	23	3127	3310	−183	57	2012 LNBP playoffs
9	Abejas de Guanajuato	40	16	24	3443	3585	−142	56	2012 LNBP playoffs
10	Correcaminos UAT Victoria	40	16	24	3394	3351	+43	56	2012 LNBP playoffs
11	Lechugueros de León	40	15	25	3417	3438	−21	55	2012 LNBP playoffs
12	Panteras de Aguascalientes	40	11	29	3094	3417	−323	51	2012 LNBP playoffs
13	Águilas Rojas de San Juan del Río	40	6	34	3298	3990	−692	46	
14	Volcanes del Estado de México	40	0	40	2237	3523	−1286	40	

Source: lnbp.com.mx

== Playoffs ==
=== Preliminary round ===
The team seed is indicated after the team name. The first 4 teams in the standings are automatically qualified for the quarterfinals.

- Barreteros de Zacatecas (8) defeat Abejas de Guanajuato (9), 3–2
- Soles de Mexicali (5) defeat Panteras de Aguascalientes (12), 3–1
- Halcones UV Xalapa (6) defeat Lechugueros de León (11), 3–0
- Huracanes de Tampico (7) defeat Correcaminos UAT Victoria (10), 3–2

=== Playoffs ===
Quarterfinals
1	Halcones Rojos	4
8	Barreteros	0
4	Pioneros	4
5	Soles	1
3	Toros	4
6	Halcones Xal.	2
2	Fuerza Regia	4
7	Huracanes	2

Semifinals
1	Halcones Rojos	4
4	Pioneros	0
3	Toros	4
2	Fuerza Regia	3

Finals
1	Halcones Rojos	4
3	Toros	1
