= 2012–13 LNBP season =

- Season: 13
- Dates: September 4, 2012 – February 27, 2013
- Teams: 16

Finals
- Champions: Toros de Nuevo Laredo
- Runners-up: Halcones UV Xalapa

Statistical leaders
| Points | (Puerto Rico) Ricardo Meléndez | 1023 |
| Rebounds | (Panama) Antonio García | 384 |
| Assists | (United States) Jason Horton | 328 |
| Efficiency | (United States) Leroy Hickerson | 1111 |

The 2012–13 LNBP was the 13th season of the Liga Nacional de Baloncesto Profesional, one of the professional basketball leagues of Mexico. It started on September 4, 2012 and ended on February 27, 2013. The league title was won by Toros de Nuevo Laredo, which defeated Halcones UV Xalapa in the championship series, 4–2.

== Format ==
16 teams participate. All the teams played against each other and the standings included all 16 teams with no separation in groups. The first 12 teams qualify for the playoffs. The group playoffs have a first round (best-of-5), a second round (best-of-5), semifinals (best-of-7) and finals (best-of-7).

== Teams ==
| Team | City | State | Joined | Season No. |
|---|---|---|---|---|
| Abejas de Guanajuato | Guanajuato City | Guanajuato | 2009–10 | 4 |
| Barreteros de Zacatecas | Zacatecas City | Zacatecas | 2003 | 8 |
| Correcaminos UAT Victoria | Ciudad Victoria | Tamaulipas | 2000 | 12 |
| Fuerza Regia de Monterrey | Monterrey | Nuevo León | 2001 | 12 |
| Gansos Salvajes de la UIC | Mexico City | Distrito Federal | 2012–13 | 1 |
| Gigantes del Estado de México | Toluca | State of Mexico | 2012–13 | 1 |
| Guerreros de Guerrero Cumple | Chilpancingo | Guerrero | 2012–13 | 1 |
| Halcones Rojos Veracruz | Veracruz | Veracruz | 2005 | 8 |
| Halcones UV Xalapa | Xalapa | Veracruz | 2003 | 10 |
| Huracanes de Tampico | Tampico | Tamaulipas | 2009–10 | 4 |
| Lechugueros de León | León | Guanajuato | 2004 | 9 |
| Osos de Guadalajara | Guadalajara | Jalisco | 2012–13 | 1 |
| Panteras de Aguascalientes | Aguascalientes City | Aguascalientes | 2003 | 10 |
| Pioneros de Quintana Roo | Cancún | Quintana Roo | 2006 | 7 |
| Soles de Mexicali | Mexicali | Baja California | 2005 | 8 |
| Toros de Nuevo Laredo | Nuevo Laredo | Tamaulipas | 2007–08 | 6 |

== Regular season ==
=== Standings ===
| Pos | Team | Pld | W | L | PF | PA | PD | Pts | Qualification |
|---|---|---|---|---|---|---|---|---|---|
| 1 | Halcones UV Xalapa | 40 | 36 | 4 | 4066 | 3426 | +640 | 76 | 2013 LNBP playoffs |
| 2 | Halcones Rojos Veracruz | 40 | 32 | 8 | 3431 | 2968 | +463 | 72 | 2013 LNBP playoffs |
| 3 | Toros de Nuevo Laredo | 40 | 31 | 9 | 3393 | 3017 | +376 | 71 | 2013 LNBP playoffs |
| 4 | Soles de Mexicali | 40 | 31 | 9 | 3469 | 3091 | +378 | 71 | 2013 LNBP playoffs |
| 5 | Panteras de Aguascalientes | 40 | 28 | 12 | 3597 | 3352 | +245 | 68 | 2013 LNBP playoffs |
| 6 | Pioneros de Quintana Roo | 40 | 28 | 12 | 3612 | 3136 | +476 | 68 | 2013 LNBP playoffs |
| 7 | Fuerza Regia de Monterrey | 40 | 25 | 15 | 3594 | 3400 | +194 | 65 | 2013 LNBP playoffs |
| 8 | Huracanes de Tampico | 40 | 22 | 18 | 3575 | 3452 | +123 | 62 | 2013 LNBP playoffs |
| 9 | Abejas de Guanajuato | 40 | 19 | 21 | 3581 | 3514 | +67 | 59 | 2013 LNBP playoffs |
| 10 | Barreteros de Zacatecas | 40 | 17 | 23 | 3485 | 3530 | −45 | 57 | 2013 LNBP playoffs |
| 11 | Correcaminos UAT Victoria | 40 | 16 | 24 | 3510 | 3641 | −131 | 56 | 2013 LNBP playoffs |
| 12 | Lechugueros de León | 40 | 12 | 28 | 2984 | 3263 | −279 | 52 | 2013 LNBP playoffs |
| 13 | Guerreros de Guerrero Cumple | 40 | 8 | 32 | 3239 | 3749 | −510 | 48 | |
| 14 | Gansos Salvajes de la UIC | 40 | 6 | 34 | 3361 | 4008 | −647 | 46 | |
| 15 | Osos de Guadalajara | 40 | 6 | 34 | 3103 | 3755 | −652 | 46 | |
| 16 | Gigantes del Estado de México | 40 | 3 | 37 | 3196 | 3894 | −698 | 43 | |

Source: lnbp.com.mx

Note: the LNBP gave 70 points to Soles, 51 to Lechugueros, 46 to Guerreros and 44 to Osos.

== Playoffs ==
=== Preliminary round ===
The team seed is indicated after the team name. The first 4 teams in the standings are automatically qualified for the quarterfinals.

- Abejas de Guanajuato (9) defeat Huracanes de Tampico (8), 3–1
- Panteras de Aguascalientes (5) defeat Lechugueros de León (12), 3–0
- Pioneros de Quintana Roo (6) defeat Correcaminos UAT Victoria (11), 3–0
- Fuerza Regia de Monterrey (7) defeat Barreteros de Zacatecas (10), 3–0

=== Playoffs ===
Quarterfinals
1 | Halcones Xal. | 4
9 | Abejas | 0
4 | Soles | 4
5 | Panteras | 2
3 | Toros | 4
6 | Pioneros | 1
2 | Halcones Rojos | 4
7 | Fuerza Regia | 2

Semifinals
1 | Halcones Xal. | 4
4 | Soles | 3
3 | Toros | 4
2 | Halcones Rojos | 3

Finals
1 | Halcones Xal. | 2
3 | Toros | 4
