= 2009–10 LNBP season =

- Season: 10
- Dates: September 10, 2009 – March 10, 2010
- Teams: 20

Finals
- Champions: Halcones UV Xalapa
- Runners-up: Halcones Rojos Veracruz

Statistical leaders
Points	(United States) John Millsap	1000
Rebounds	(United States) Ramel Allen	375
Assists	(United States) Will Funn	257
Efficiency	(United States) Jerome Habel	1030

The 2009–10 LNBP was the 10th season of the Liga Nacional de Baloncesto Profesional, one of the professional basketball leagues of Mexico. It started on September 10, 2009 and ended on March 10, 2010. The league title was won by Halcones UV Xalapa, which defeated Halcones Rojos Veracruz in the championship series, 4–1.

== Format ==
20 teams participate. The format was changed for this season: instead of having 2 groups, all the teams played against each other and the standings included all 20 teams with no separation in groups. The first 16 teams qualify for the playoffs. The playoffs have eighth-finals (best-of-5), quarterfinals (best-of-5), semifinals (best-of-7) and finals (best-of-7).

== Teams ==
Team	City	State	Joined	Season No.
Abejas de Guanajuato	Guanajuato City	Guanajuato	2009–10	1
Ángeles de Puebla	Puebla	Puebla	2007–08	3
Barreteros de Zacatecas	Zacatecas City	Zacatecas	2003	6
Bucaneros de Campeche	Campeche City	Campeche	2006	4
Cosmos de Tijuana	Tijuana	Baja California	2005	5
Fuerza Regia de Monterrey	Monterrey	Nuevo León	2001	9
Halcones Rojos Veracruz	Veracruz	Veracruz	2005	5
Halcones UV Córdoba	Córdoba	Veracruz	2007–08	3
Halcones UV Xalapa	Xalapa	Veracruz	2003	7
Huracanes de Tampico	Tampico	Tamaulipas	2009–10	1
Indios de la UACJ	Ciudad Juárez	Chihuahua	2000	2
Lechugueros de León	León	Guanajuato	2004	6
Libertadores de Querétaro	Querétaro City	Querétaro	2009–10	1
Lobos Grises de la UAD	Durango City	Durango	2005	5
Panteras de Aguascalientes	Aguascalientes City	Aguascalientes	2003	7
Pilares del Distrito Federal	Mexico City	Distrito Federal	2009–10	1
Pioneros de Quintana Roo	Cancún	Quintana Roo	2006	4
Potros ITSON de Obregón	Ciudad Obregón	Sonora	2008–09	2
Soles de Mexicali	Mexicali	Baja California	2005	5
Toros de Nuevo Laredo	Nuevo Laredo	Tamaulipas	2007–08	3

== Regular season ==
=== Standings ===
Pos	Team	Pld	W	L	PF	PA	PD	Pts	Qualification
1	Halcones Rojos Veracruz	40	32	8	3510	3212	+298	72	2010 LNBP playoffs
2	Halcones UV Xalapa	40	32	8	3664	3162	+502	72	2010 LNBP playoffs
3	Pioneros de Quintana Roo	40	31	9	3777	3404	+373	71	2010 LNBP playoffs
4	Toros de Nuevo Laredo	40	30	10	3570	3270	+300	70	2010 LNBP playoffs
5	Soles de Mexicali	40	30	10	3461	3132	+329	70	2010 LNBP playoffs
6	Halcones UV Córdoba	40	28	12	3648	3158	+490	68	2010 LNBP playoffs
7	Lobos Grises de la UAD	40	27	13	3885	3520	+365	67	2010 LNBP playoffs
8	Bucaneros de Campeche	40	23	17	3605	3535	+70	63	2010 LNBP playoffs
9	Panteras de Aguascalientes	40	20	20	3219	3277	−58	60	2010 LNBP playoffs
10	Fuerza Regia de Monterrey	40	19	21	3343	3365	−22	59	2010 LNBP playoffs
11	Lechugueros de León	40	19	21	3464	3447	+17	59	2010 LNBP playoffs
12	Potros ITSON de Obregón	40	18	22	3396	3411	−15	58	2010 LNBP playoffs
13	Ángeles de Puebla	40	17	23	3466	3633	−167	57	2010 LNBP playoffs
14	Barreteros de Zacatecas	40	16	24	3381	3510	−129	56	2010 LNBP playoffs
15	Abejas de Guanajuato	40	16	24	3158	3318	−160	56	2010 LNBP playoffs
16	Huracanes de Tampico	40	13	27	3175	3348	−173	53	2010 LNBP playoffs
17	Libertadores de Querétaro	40	11	29	3187	3598	−411	51	
18	Cosmos de Tijuana	40	8	32	3403	3851	−448	48	
19	Indios de la UACJ	40	8	32	3259	3627	−368	48	
20	Pilares del Distrito Federal	40	2	38	3151	3944	−793	42	

Source: lnbp.com.mx

== Playoffs ==
Eighthfinals
1	Halcones Rojos	3
16	Huracanes	1
8	Bucaneros	2
9	Panteras	3
4	Toros	3
13	Ángeles	1
5	Soles	3
12	Potros	0
2	Halcones Xal.	3
15	Abejas	0
7	Lobos Grises	3
10	Fuerza Regia	1
3	Pioneros	3
14	Barreteros	0
6	Halcones Cór.	3
11	Lechugueros	0

Quarterfinals
1	Halcones Rojos	3
9	Panteras	0
4	Toros	3
5	Soles	2
2	Halcones Xal.	3
7	Lobos Grises	2
3	Pioneros	3
6	Halcones Cór.	2

Semifinals
1	Halcones Rojos	4
4	Toros	2
2	Halcones Xal.	4
3	Pioneros	3

Final
1	Halcones Rojos	1
2	Halcones Xal.	4
