= 2010–11 LNBP season =

- Season: 11
- Dates: September 2, 2010 – March 1, 2011
- Teams: 18

Finals
- Champions: Toros de Nuevo Laredo
- Runners-up: Pioneros de Quintana Roo

Statistical leaders
Points	(Puerto Rico) Ricardo Meléndez	696
Rebounds	(Panama) Antonio García	335
Assists	(Mexico) Paul Stoll	140
Efficiency	(United States) Mike Smith	726

The 2010–11 LNBP was the 11th season of the Liga Nacional de Baloncesto Profesional, one of the professional basketball leagues of Mexico. It started on September 2, 2010 and ended on March 1, 2011. The league title was won by Toros de Nuevo Laredo, which defeated Pioneros de Quintana Roo in the championship series, 4–2.

== Format ==
18 teams participate. All the teams played against each other and the standings included all 18 teams with no separation in groups. The first 12 teams qualify for the playoffs. The playoffs have a first round (best-of-5), a second round (best-of-5), semifinals (best-of-7) and finals (best-of-7).

== Teams ==
Team	City	State	Joined	Season No.
Abejas de Guanajuato	Guanajuato City	Guanajuato	2009–10	2
Algodoneros de la Comarca	Torreón	Coahuila	2000	10
Ángeles de Puebla	Puebla	Puebla	2007–08	4
Fuerza Regia de Monterrey	Monterrey	Nuevo León	2001	10
Halcones Rojos Veracruz	Veracruz	Veracruz	2005	6
Halcones UV Xalapa	Xalapa	Veracruz	2003	8
Huracanes de Tampico	Tampico	Tamaulipas	2009–10	2
Jaguares de la Bahía	Bahía de Banderas	Nayarit	2010–11	1
Lechugueros de León	León	Guanajuato	2004	7
Lobos Grises de la UAD	Durango City	Durango	2005	5
Ola Verde de Poza Rica	Poza Rica	Veracruz	2010–11	1
Panteras de Aguascalientes	Aguascalientes City	Aguascalientes	2003	8
Pioneros de Quintana Roo	Cancún	Quintana Roo	2006	5
Potros ITSON de Obregón	Ciudad Obregón	Sonora	2008–09	3
Soles de Mexicali	Mexicali	Baja California	2005	6
Titanes Capital del Distrito Federal	Mexico City	Distrito Federal	2010–11	1
Toros de Nuevo Laredo	Nuevo Laredo	Tamaulipas	2007–08	4
Volcanes del Estado de México	Toluca	State of Mexico	2010–11	1

== Regular season ==
=== Standings ===
Pos	Team	Pld	W	L	PF	PA	PD	Pts	Qualification
1	Pioneros de Quintana Roo	36	28	8	3268	2709	+559	64	2011 LNBP playoffs
2	Fuerza Regia de Monterrey	36	27	9	3112	2797	+315	63	2011 LNBP playoffs
3	Halcones UV Xalapa	36	26	10	3051	2823	+228	62	2011 LNBP playoffs
4	Halcones Rojos Veracruz	36	25	11	2860	2468	+392	61	2011 LNBP playoffs
5	Toros de Nuevo Laredo	36	25	11	3055	2754	+301	61	2011 LNBP playoffs
6	Ángeles de Puebla	36	24	12	2847	2645	+202	60	2011 LNBP playoffs
7	Lechugueros de León	36	22	14	2979	2818	+161	58	2011 LNBP playoffs
8	Huracanes de Tampico	36	22	14	2947	2857	+90	58	2011 LNBP playoffs
9	Lobos Grises de la UAD	36	22	14	3056	2853	+203	58	2011 LNBP playoffs
10	Soles de Mexicali	36	20	16	2786	2654	+132	56	2011 LNBP playoffs
11	Potros ITSON de Obregón	36	17	19	2971	2905	+66	53	2011 LNBP playoffs
12	Abejas de Guanajuato	35	12	23	2726	2825	−99	47	2011 LNBP playoffs
13	Panteras de Aguascalientes	33	13	20	2899	3024	−125	46	
14	Titanes Capital del Distrito Federal	36	9	27	2570	3020	−450	45	
15	Volcanes del Estado de México	36	2	34	2644	3571	−927	38	
16	Saltillo	33	3	30	2364	2975	−611	36	
17	Ola Verde de Poza Rica†	30	9	21	2595	2601	−6	39	Retired Dec. 20, 2010
18	Algodoneros de la Comarca†	35	8	27	2168	2599	−431	43	Retired Dec. 3, 2010

Source: lnbp.com.mx

Note 1: Ola Verde de Poza Rica and Algodoneros de la Comarca retired before the end of the season, and were therefore ranked at the bottom of the table.
Note 2: Jaguares de la Bahía moved to Saltillo in the state of Coahuila in October and took the name Saltillo.

== Playoffs ==
=== First round ===
The team seed is indicated after the team name.

- Pioneros de Quintana Roo (1) defeats Abejas de Guanajuato (12), 3–0
- Fuerza Regia de Monterrey (2) defeats Potros ITSON de Obregón (11), 3–2
- Halcones UV Xalapa (3) defeats Soles de Mexicali (10), 3–0
- Halcones Rojos Veracruz (4) defeats Lobos Grises de la UAD (9), 3–0
- Toros de Nuevo Laredo (5) defeats Huracanes de Tampico (8), 3–2
- Ángeles de Puebla (6) defeats Lechugueros de León (7), 3–0

=== Second round ===
- Pioneros de Quintana Roo (1) defeats Ángeles de Puebla (6), 3–1
- Toros de Nuevo Laredo (5) defeats Fuerza Regia de Monterrey (2), 3–1
- Halcones UV Xalapa (3) defeats Halcones Rojos Veracruz (4), 3–2

=== Semifinals ===
Note: Fuerza Regia is qualified to the semifinals as the best losing team.

Semifinals
1	Pioneros	4
2	Fuerza Regia	3
3	Halcones Xal.	1
5	Toros	4

Final
1	Pioneros	2
5	Toros	4
