= 2008–09 LNBP season =

- Season: 9
- Dates: September 4, 2008 – March 18, 2009
- Teams: 24

Finals
- Champions: Halcones UV Xalapa
- Runners-up: Soles de Mexicali

Statistical leaders
| Points | (United States) Devon Ford | 1196 |
| Rebounds | (Dominican Republic) Jack Michael Martínez | 588 |
| Assists | (United States) Mark Borders | 257 |
| Efficiency | (United States) Devon Ford | 1215 |

The 2008–09 LNBP was the 9th season of the Liga Nacional de Baloncesto Profesional, one of the professional basketball leagues of Mexico. It started on September 4, 2008, and ended on March 18, 2009. The league title was won by Halcones UV Xalapa, which defeated Soles de Mexicali in the championship series, 4–2.

== Format ==
24 teams participate. The teams are divided in two groups of 12 teams each, called Zonas (zones): Zona Norte (North) and Zona Sur (South). The first 8 teams in each group qualify for the playoffs. The group playoffs have quarterfinals (best-of-5), semifinals (best-of-7) and finals (best-of-7). The winner of each group series qualify for the championship series (best-of-7), named Final de Finales (Final of Finals).

== Teams ==
| Team | City | State | Joined | Season No. |
|---|---|---|---|---|
| Algodoneros de la Comarca | Torreón | Coahuila | 2000 | 9 |
| Ángeles de Puebla | Puebla | Puebla | 2007–08 | 2 |
| Barreteros de Zacatecas | Zacatecas City | Zacatecas | 2003 | 5 |
| Bravos de Piedras Negras | Piedras Negras | Coahuila | 2007–08 | 2 |
| Bucaneros de Campeche | Campeche City | Campeche | 2006 | 3 |
| Correcaminos UAT Victoria | Ciudad Victoria | Tamaulipas | 2000 | 9 |
| Dorados de Chihuahua | Chihuahua City | Chihuahua | 2000 | 4 |
| Estrellas Indebasquet del Distrito Federal | Mexico City | Distrito Federal | 2008–09 | 1 |
| Fuerza Regia de Monterrey | Monterrey | Nuevo León | 2001 | 8 |
| Galgos de Tijuana | Tijuana | Baja California | 2005 | 4 |
| Halcones UV Córdoba | Córdoba | Veracruz | 2007–08 | 2 |
| Halcones UV Veracruz | Veracruz | Veracruz | 2005 | 4 |
| Halcones UV Xalapa | Xalapa | Veracruz | 2003 | 6 |
| Lechugueros de León | León | Guanajuato | 2004 | 5 |
| Lobos de la UAdeC | Saltillo | Coahuila | 2001 | 8 |
| Lobos Grises de la UAD | Durango City | Durango | 2005 | 4 |
| Loros de la Universidad de Colima | Colima City | Colima | 2008–09 | 1 |
| Panteras de Aguascalientes | Aguascalientes City | Aguascalientes | 2003 | 6 |
| Pioneros de Quintana Roo | Cancún | Quintana Roo | 2006 | 3 |
| Potros ITSON de Obregón | Ciudad Obregón | Sonora | 2008–09 | 1 |
| Santos Reales de San Luis | San Luis Potosí City | San Luis Potosí | 2003 | 6 |
| Soles de Mexicali | Mexicali | Baja California | 2005 | 4 |
| Tecos de la UAG | Guadalajara | Jalisco | 2001 | 7 |
| Venados de Nuevo Laredo | Nuevo Laredo | Tamaulipas | 2007–08 | 2 |

== Regular season ==
=== Zona Norte standings ===
| Pos | Team | Pld | W | L | PF | PA | PD | Pts | Qualification |
|---|---|---|---|---|---|---|---|---|---|
| 1 | Soles de Mexicali | 48 | 39 | 9 | 4337 | 3835 | +502 | 87 | 2008–09 LNBP playoffs |
| 2 | Tecos de la UAG | 48 | 39 | 9 | 4404 | 4021 | +383 | 87 | 2008–09 LNBP playoffs |
| 3 | Lobos Grises de la UAD | 48 | 29 | 19 | 4218 | 4003 | +215 | 77 | 2008–09 LNBP playoffs |
| 4 | Algodoneros de la Comarca | 47 | 28 | 19 | 4358 | 4136 | +222 | 75 | 2008–09 LNBP playoffs |
| 5 | Fuerza Regia de Monterrey | 48 | 25 | 23 | 4199 | 4099 | +100 | 73 | 2008–09 LNBP playoffs |
| 6 | Dorados de Chihuahua | 47 | 22 | 25 | 4030 | 3941 | +89 | 69 | 2008–09 LNBP playoffs |
| 7 | Venados de Nuevo Laredo | 48 | 19 | 29 | 4109 | 4314 | −205 | 67 | 2008–09 LNBP playoffs |
| 8 | Lobos de la UAdeC | 48 | 18 | 30 | 3864 | 3870 | −6 | 66 | 2008–09 LNBP playoffs |
| 9 | Correcaminos UAT Victoria | 48 | 17 | 31 | 4132 | 4391 | −259 | 65 | |
| 10 | Galgos de Tijuana | 47 | 15 | 32 | 4074 | 4251 | −177 | 62 | |
| 11 | Bravos de Piedras Negras | 48 | 13 | 35 | 3886 | 4676 | −790 | 61 | |
| 12 | Potros ITSON de Obregón | 48 | 11 | 37 | 4001 | 4506 | −505 | 59 | |

Source: lnbp.com.mx

=== Zona Sur standings ===
| Pos | Team | Pld | W | L | PF | PA | PD | Pts | Qualification |
|---|---|---|---|---|---|---|---|---|---|
| 1 | Halcones UV Xalapa | 48 | 46 | 2 | 4739 | 3927 | +812 | 94 | 2008–09 LNBP playoffs |
| 2 | Halcones Rojos Veracruz | 47 | 34 | 13 | 4240 | 3981 | +259 | 81 | 2008–09 LNBP playoffs |
| 3 | Halcones UV Córdoba | 48 | 31 | 17 | 4597 | 4208 | +389 | 79 | 2008–09 LNBP playoffs |
| 4 | Panteras de Aguascalientes | 47 | 31 | 16 | 4049 | 3840 | +209 | 78 | 2008–09 LNBP playoffs |
| 5 | Barreteros de Zacatecas | 48 | 27 | 21 | 4155 | 4027 | +128 | 75 | 2008–09 LNBP playoffs |
| 6 | Bucaneros de Campeche | 48 | 26 | 22 | 3972 | 3969 | +3 | 74 | 2008–09 LNBP playoffs |
| 7 | Santos Reales de San Luis | 48 | 24 | 24 | 4307 | 4158 | +149 | 72 | 2008–09 LNBP playoffs |
| 8 | Lechugueros de León | 48 | 24 | 24 | 3893 | 3847 | +46 | 72 | 2008–09 LNBP playoffs |
| 9 | Ángeles de Puebla | 48 | 19 | 29 | 4037 | 4318 | −281 | 67 | |
| 10 | Pioneros de Quintana Roo | 47 | 17 | 30 | 4140 | 4179 | −39 | 64 | |
| 11 | Loros de la Universidad de Colima | 48 | 10 | 38 | 3563 | 4173 | −610 | 58 | |
| 12 | Estrellas Indebasquet del DF | 48 | 7 | 41 | 3667 | 4301 | −634 | 55 | |

Source: lnbp.com.mx

== Playoffs ==
First Round | Second round
1 | Soles | 3
8 | Lobos | 0
1 | Soles | 4
6 | Dorados | 2
3 | Lobos Grises | 1
6 | Dorados | 3
Zona Norte
2 | Tecos | 3
7 | Venados | 1
2 | Tecos | 4
4 | Algodoneros | 2
4 | Algodoneros | 3
5 | Fuerza Regia | 0
1 | Halcones Xal. | 3
8 | Lechugueros | 2
1 | Halcones Xal. | 4
4 | Panteras | 1
4 | Panteras | 3
5 | Barreteros | 1
Zona Sur
2 | Halcones Rojos | 3
7 | Santos Reales | 2
2 | Halcones Rojos | 1
3 | Halcones Cór. | 4
3 | Halcones Cór. | 3
6 | Bucaneros | 0

Zone Finals
1 | Soles | 4
2 | Tecos | 2
1 | Halcones Xal. | 4
3 | Halcones Cór. | 1

Final
N1 | Soles | 2
S1 | Halcones Xal. | 4

== All-Star Game ==
The 2008 LNBP All-Star Game was played in Mexico City at the Gimnasio Olímpico Juan de la Barrera on December 16, 2008. The game was played between Zona Norte and Zona Sur. Zona Sur won, 123–122.

=== Teams ===
Zona Norte

- (Mexico) Noé Alonzo (Tecos de la UAG)
- (Mexico) Antonio García (Tecos de la UAG)
- (United States) Keith Gayden (Venados de Nuevo Laredo)
- (United States) Greg Lewis (Soles de Mexicali)
- (Mexico) Horacio Llamas (Soles de Mexicali)
- (Mexico) Omar López (Galgos de Tijuana)
- (Mexico) Rommel Marentez (Galgos de Tijuana)
- (Puerto Rico) Ricardo Meléndez (Tecos de la UAG)
- (Mexico) Anthony Pedroza (Soles de Mexicali)
- (United States) Antoine Stockman (Venados de Nuevo Laredo)
- (United States) Blake Walker (Algodoneros de la Comarca)
- (United States) Gerald Williams (Lobos de la UAdeC)

- Coaches: (Uruguay) Alberto Espasandín (Tecos de la UAG) and (Spain) Iván Déniz (Soles de Mexicali)

Zona Sur

- (Mexico) Víctor Ávila (Halcones UV Xalapa)
- (Mexico) Gustavo Ayón (Halcones UV Xalapa)
- (United States) Kenya Capers (Barreteros de Zacatecas)
- (Mexico) Alfonso Flores (Estrellas Indebasquet del DF)
- (United States) Devon Ford (Panteras de Aguascalientes)
- (United States) Justin Griffin (Barreteros de Zacatecas)
- (Mexico) Juan Herrera (Santos Reales de San Luis)
- (United States) Leroy Hickerson (Halcones UV Xalapa
- (Dominican Republic) Jack Michael Martínez (Halcones UV Veracruz)
- (Venezuela) Hernán Salcedo (Ángeles de Puebla)
- (Mexico) Adrián Sánchez (Lechugueros de León)
- (Mexico) Sergio Sánchez (Halcones UV Córdoba)

- Coaches: (United States) Andy Stoglin (Halcones UV Xalapa) and (Puerto Rico) Manolo Cintrón (Halcones UV Veracruz)
