= 2005 LNBP season =

- Season: 6
- Dates: June 30, 2005 – November 21, 2005
- Teams: 20

Finals
- Champions: Halcones UV Xalapa
- Runners-up: Lobos de la UAdeC

Statistical leaders
Points	(United States) Ryan Moore	993
Rebounds	(United States) Reginald McKoy	523
Assists	(Mexico) Karim Malpica	248
Efficiency	(United States) Justin Howard	1130

The 2005 LNBP was the 6th season of the Liga Nacional de Baloncesto Profesional, one of the professional basketball leagues of Mexico. It started on June 30, 2005 and ended on November 21, 2005. The league title was won by Halcones UV Xalapa, which defeated Lobos de la UAdeC in the championship series, 4–1.

== Format ==
20 teams participate. The teams are divided in two groups of 10 teams each, called Zonas (zones): Zona Norte (North) and Zona Sur (South). The first 8 teams in each group qualify for the playoffs. The group playoffs have quarterfinals (best-of-5), semifinals (best-of-7) and finals (best-of-7). The winner of each group series qualify for the championship series (best-of-7), named Campeón de Campeones (Champion of Champions).

== Teams ==
Team	City	State	Joined	Season No.
Algodoneros de la Comarca	Torreón	Coahuila	2000	6
Barreteros de Zacatecas	Zacatecas City	Zacatecas	2003	3
Cometas de Querétaro	Querétaro City	Querétaro	2003	3
Correcaminos UAT Matamoros	Matamoros	Tamaulipas	2000	6
Correcaminos UAT Reynosa	Reynosa	Tamaulipas	2000	2
Correcaminos UAT Victoria	Ciudad Victoria	Tamaulipas	2000	6
Fuerza Regia de Monterrey	Monterrey	Nuevo León	2001	5
Galgos de Tijuana	Tijuana	Baja California	2005	1
Gambusinos de Fresnillo	Fresnillo	Zacatecas	2002	4
Halcones UV Veracruz	Veracruz	Veracruz	2005	1
Halcones UV Xalapa	Xalapa	Veracruz	2003	3
Lechugueros de León	León	Guanajuato	2004	2
Lobos de la UAdeC	Saltillo	Coahuila	2001	5
Lobos Grises de la UAD	Durango City	Durango	2005	1
La Ola Roja del Distrito Federal	Mexico City	Distrito Federal	2000	6
Panteras de Aguascalientes	Aguascalientes City	Aguascalientes	2003	3
Santos Reales de San Luis	San Luis Potosí City	San Luis Potosí	2003	3
Soles de Mexicali	Mexicali	Baja California	2005	1
Tecos de la UAG	Guadalajara	Jalisco	2001	5
Tuberos de Colima	Colima City	Colima	2002	4

== Regular season ==
=== Zona Norte standings ===
Pos	Team	Pld	W	L	PF	PA	PD	Pts	Qualification
1	Lobos de la UAdeC	40	27	13	4037	3816	+221	67	2005 LNBP playoffs
2	Santos Reales de San Luis	40	25	15	3760	3525	+235	65	2005 LNBP playoffs
3	Fuerza Regia de Monterrey	40	23	17	4019	3840	+179	63	2005 LNBP playoffs
4	Soles de Mexicali	40	21	19	3500	3469	+31	61	2005 LNBP playoffs
5	Lobos Grises de la UAD	40	20	20	3659	3665	−6	60	2005 LNBP playoffs
6	Correcaminos UAT Reynosa	40	19	21	3696	3916	−220	59	2005 LNBP playoffs
7	Correcaminos UAT Victoria	40	19	21	3616	3581	+35	59	2005 LNBP playoffs
8	Correcaminos UAT Matamoros	40	18	22	3472	3598	−126	58	2005 LNBP playoffs
9	Galgos de Tijuana	40	15	25	3640	3729	−89	55	
10	Algodoneros de la Comarca	40	14	26	3828	4009	−181	54	

Source: lnbp.com.mx

Note: the LNBP website calculates 59 points for Lobos Grises de la UAD.

=== Zona Sur standings ===
Pos	Team	Pld	W	L	PF	PA	PD	Pts	Qualification
1	Halcones UV Xalapa	40	32	8	4067	3670	+397	72	2005 LNBP playoffs
2	Halcones UV Veracruz	40	26	14	3764	3461	+303	66	2005 LNBP playoffs
3	Lechugueros de León	40	24	16	3628	3439	+189	64	2005 LNBP playoffs
4	La Ola Roja del Distrito Federal	40	23	17	3560	3508	+52	63	2005 LNBP playoffs
5	Tecos de la UAG	40	22	18	3594	3544	+50	62	2005 LNBP playoffs
6	Panteras de Aguascalientes	40	20	20	3628	3523	+105	60	2005 LNBP playoffs
7	Gambusinos de Fresnillo	40	20	20	3719	3802	−83	60	2005 LNBP playoffs
8	Barreteros de Zacatecas	40	17	23	3650	3848	−198	57	2005 LNBP playoffs
9	Cometas de Querétaro	40	8	32	3228	3601	−373	48	
10	Tuberos de Colima	40	7	33	3371	3892	−521	47	

Source: lnbp.com.mx

== Playoffs ==
The playoffs were played between October 17 and November 21, 2005. The team seed is indicated after the team name. The winning team is bolded.

=== Zone quarterfinals ===
==== Zona Norte ====
- **Lobos de la UAdeC (1)** vs. Correcaminos UAT Matamoros (8)
- **Santos Reales de San Luis (2)** vs. Correcaminos UAT Victoria (7)
- **Fuerza Regia de Monterrey (3)** vs. Correcaminos UAT Reynosa (6)
- **Soles de Mexicali (4)** vs. Lobos Grises de la UAD (5)

==== Zona Sur ====
- **Halcones UV Xalapa (1)** vs. Barreteros de Zacatecas (8)
- **Halcones UV Veracruz (2)** vs. Gambusinos de Fresnillo (7)
- **Lechugueros de León (3)** vs. Panteras de Aguascalientes (6)
- La Ola Roja del Distrito Federal (4) vs. **Tecos de la UAG (5)**

=== Zone semifinals ===
==== Zona Norte ====
- **Lobos de la UAdeC (1)** vs. Soles de Mexicali (4)
- **Fuerza Regia de Monterrey (3)** vs. Santos Reales de San Luis (2)

==== Zona Sur ====
- **Halcones UV Xalapa (1)** vs. Tecos de la UAG (5)
- **Lechugueros de León (3)** vs. Halcones UV Veracruz (2)

=== Zone finals ===
==== Zona Norte ====
- **Lobos de la UAdeC (1)** vs. Fuerza Regia de Monterrey (3)

==== Zona Sur ====
- **Halcones UV Xalapa (1)** vs. Lechugueros de León (3)

=== Championship finals ===
- November 16: **Halcones UV Xalapa 115**, Lobos de la UAdeC 103
- November 17: **Lobos de la UAdeC 90**, Halcones UV Xalapa 88
- November 19: **Halcones UV Xalapa 105**, Lobos de la UAdeC 99
- November 20: **Halcones UV Xalapa 110**, Lobos de la UAdeC 104
- November 21: **Halcones UV Xalapa 107**, Lobos de la UAdeC 92
- **Halcones UV Xalapa** defeats Lobos de la UAdeC, 4–1.

== Copa Independencia ==
The second edition of the Copa Independencia took place in September in Saltillo, and was played between the 8 best ranked teams at the end of the first part of the season (the first 4 ranked of each Zona). The competition was won by Lobos de la UAdeC (their second title), which defeated Correcaminos UAT Victoria in the final game, 101–83.

=== Quarterfinals ===
- September 12: Galgos de Tijuana 109, Santos Reales de San Luis 96
- September 12: Correcaminos UAT Victoria 86, Halcones UV Veracruz 69
- September 12: Tecos de la UAG 93, Halcones UV Xalapa 91
- September 12: Lobos de la UAdeC 135, La Ola Roja del Distrito Federal 85

=== Semifinals ===
- September 13: Correcaminos UAT Victoria 80, Tecos de la UAG 73
- September 13: Lobos de la UAdeC 119, Galgos de Tijuana 97

=== Final ===
- September 14: Lobos de la UAdeC 101, Correcaminos UAT Victoria 83

== All-Star Game ==
The 2005 LNBP All-Star Game was played in Veracruz at the Auditorio Benito Juárez on September 15, 2005. The game was played between a team of Mexican players (Mexicanos) and a team of foreign players (Extranjeros). The Foreigners won, 105–96.

=== Teams ===
Mexicanos

- Víctor Ávila (Halcones UV Xalapa)
- Óscar Castellanos (Halcones UV Veracruz)
- Florentino Chávez (Correcaminos UAT Victoria)
- David Crouse (Lobos de la UAdeC)
- Horacio Llamas (Soles de Mexicali)
- Omar López (Halcones UV Xalapa)
- Richard López (La Ola Roja del Distrito Federal)
- Víctor Mariscal (Halcones UV Xalapa)
- Anthony Norwood (Tecos de la UAG)
- Héctor Nungaray (Santos Reales de San Luis)
- Jorge Rochín (Lechugueros de León)
- Arim Solares (Santos Reales de San Luis)
- Enrique Zúñiga (Lechugueros de León)

- Coaches: Luis Manuel López (Santos Reales de San Luis) and Ángel González (Halcones UV Xalapa)

Extranjeros

- (Senegal) Boubacar Aw (La Ola Roja del Distrito Federal)
- (United States) Samuel Bowie (Halcones UV Xalapa)
- (United States) Robert Brown (Lobos Grises de la UAD)
- (United States) Darryl Hepburn (Tuberos de Colima)
- (United States) Byron Johnson (Algodoneros de la Comarca)
- (United States) Reggie Jordan (Lechugueros de León)
- (United States) Roland Lamont (Correcaminos UAT Matamoros)
- (United States) Reginald McKoy (Galgos de Tijuana)
- (United States) Matthew Mitchell (Panteras de Aguascalientes)
- (United States) Antonio Rivers (Halcones UV Veracruz)
- (United States) Antonio Robertson (Barreteros de Zacatecas)
- (United States) Galen Robinson (Correcaminos UAT Reynosa)
- (United States) Jamaal Thomas (Fuerza Regia de Monterrey)

- Coaches: (Puerto Rico) José Martínez Boglio (Fuerza Regia de Monterrey) and Ricardo Gilberto Benítez (Correcaminos UAT Victoria)
