= 2022 LNBP season =

- League: Liga Nacional de Baloncesto Profesional
- Sport: Basketball
- Duration: July 12 – October 28, 2022
- Games: 20
- Teams: 10

Regular season
- Top seed: Astros de Jalisco

Playoffs

Finals
- Champions: Abejas de León
- Runners-up: Astros de Jalisco
- Finals MVP: Michael Smith (Abejas de León)

Seasons
- ← 2021 2023 →

The 2022 LNBP season is the 22nd season of the Liga Nacional de Baloncesto Profesional (LNBP), the top level basketball league of Mexico. The season began on July 12 and ended on October 28, 2022 with Abejas de León got the championship sweep of 4–0 series win over Astros de Jalisco, giving Abejas their 1st Title.

This season features 10 teams. The format was changed since last season, since an overall table was used to determine the 8 teams that qualify for the playoffs (instead of using the East and West Districts).

Fuerza Regia de Monterrey were the defending champions but got eliminated in the Zone Molten Semifinal by Mineros de Zacatecas.

== Teams ==
Correcaminos UAT Victoria and Mineros de Zacatecas returned to the league. Panteras de Aguascalientes and Leñadores de Durango opted out of the season.

Team	Coach	City	Arena	Capacity
Abejas de León	(Spain) Pablo García	León, Guanajuato	Domo de la Feria	4,463
Astros de Jalisco	(Spain) Sergio Valdeolmillos	Guadalajara, Jalisco	Arena Astros	3,509
Correcaminos UAT Victoria	(Spain) Ángel Fernández	Ciudad Victoria, Tamaulipas	Gimnasio Multidisciplinario UAT Victoria	2,300
Dorados de Chihuahua	(Argentina) Sebastián González	Chihuahua, Chihuahua	Gimnasio Manuel Bernardo Aguirre	9,162
Fuerza Regia de Monterrey	(Argentina) Nicolás Casalánguida	Monterrey, Nuevo León	Gimnasio Nuevo León Independiente	5,000
Halcones de Xalapa	(Spain) Eduardo Torres	Xalapa, Veracruz	Gimnasio de la USBI	2,638
Libertadores de Querétaro	(Uruguay) Miguel Volcan	Querétaro, Querétaro	Auditorio General José María Arteaga	2,982
Mineros de Zacatecas	(Spain) Pedro Carrillo	Zacatecas, Zacatecas	Gimnasio "Profesor Marcelino González"	3,458
Plateros de Fresnillo	(Argentina) Juan José Pidal	Fresnillo, Zacatecas	Gimnasio Solidaridad Municipal	4,500
Soles de Mexicali	(Spain) Iván Déniz	Tijuana, Baja California	Auditorio PSF	4,779

== Regular season ==
=== Standings ===
As of September 21, 2022.

Pos	2022 LNBP overall table							
Pos	Team	Pld	W	L	PF	PA	PD	Pts
1	Astros de Jalisco	20	16	4	1867	1643	224	36
2	Dorados de Chihuahua	20	15	5	1707	1628	79	35
3	Fuerza Regia de Monterrey	20	12	8	1704	1679	25	32
4	Abejas de León	20	11	9	1766	1682	84	31
5	Libertadores de Querétaro	20	11	9	1762	1793	-31	31
6	Mineros de Zacatecas	20	9	11	1707	1691	16	29
7	Plateros de Fresnillo	20	9	11	1723	1729	-6	29
8	Soles de Mexicali	20	8	12	1631	1669	-38	28
9	Halcones de Xalapa	20	5	15	1622	1710	-88	25
10	Correcaminos UAT Victoria	20	4	16	1730	1995	-265	24

== All-Star Game ==
The 2022 LNBP All-Star Game was played in Guadalajara, Jalisco at the Arena Astros on 28 August 2022. Punto CHG defeated Molten by a score of 153–138. Astros de Jalisco player Brooks DeBisschop was named All-Star Game MVP after scoring 22 points.

Gary Ricks of the Fuerza Regia de Monterrey won the three-point shootout while Manny Hernández of the Libertadores de Querétaro won his second consecutive slam dunk contest title.

=== Teams ===
Punto CHG

- (United States) Vander Blue (Libertadores de Querétaro)
- (United States) Ken Brown (Plateros de Fresnillo)
- (United States) Brooks Debisschop (Astros de Jalisco)
- (Mexico) José Estrada (Halcones de Xalapa)
- (United States) Dwayne Morgan (Correcaminos UAT Victoria)
- (United States) Aaron Pérez (Correcaminos UAT Victoria)
- (United States) Joshua Ramírez (Plateros de Fresnillo)
- (United States) Karim Rodríguez (Astros de Jalisco)
- (United States) Michael Smith (Abejas de León)
- (United States) Bo Spencer (Libertadores de Querétaro)
- (United States) Durrell Summers (Mineros de Zacatecas)
- (United States) Jordan Williams (Mineros de Zacatecas)

- Coaches: (Spain) Sergio Valdeolmillos (Astros de Jalisco) and (Spain) Iván Deniz (Soles de Mexicali)

Molten

- (United States) J. J. Avila (Fuerza Regia de Monterrey)
- (United States) Daniel Bejarano (Fuerza Regia de Monterrey)
- (United States) Javion Blake (Astros de Jalisco)
- (Argentina) Juan Brussino (Dorados de Chihuahua)
- (Mexico) Omar de Haro (Dorados de Chihuahua)
- (United States) Shaquille Johnson (Halcones de Xalapa)
- (United States) D.J. Laster (Soles de Mexicali)
- (United States) Jordan Loveridge (Astros de Jalisco)
- (United States) Tre McLean (Abejas de León)
- (United States) Gary Ricks (Fuerza Regia de Monterrey)
- (United States) Donald Sims (Dorados de Chihuahua)
- (United States) Jordan Stevens (Correcaminos UAT Victoria

- Coaches: (Argentina) Sebastián González (Dorados de Chihuahua) and (Argentina) Nicolás Casalánguida (Fuerza Regia de Monterrey)

== Statistics ==
=== Individual statistical leaders ===
As of September 21, 2022.

Category	Player	Team(s)	Statistic
Points per game	Donald Sims	Dorados de Chihuahua	24.3
Rebounds per game	Cameron Forte	Correcaminos UAT Victoria	11.3
Assists per game	Paul Stoll	Fuerza Regia de Monterrey	5.75
Steals per game	Michael Jackson	Correcaminos UAT Victoria	2.4
Blocks per game	Amir Williams	Halcones de Xalapa	2.0

== Awards ==
- National Most Valuable Player: Jorge Gutiérrez, Astros de Jalisco
- Foreign Most Valuable Player: Donald Sims, Dorados de Chihuahua
- Finals Most Valuable Player: Michael Smith, Abejas de León
- Rookie of the Year: Diego Willis, Libertadores de Querétaro
- Revelation of the Year: Moisés Andriassi, Soles de Mexicali
- Coach of the Year: Sergio Valdeolmillos, Astros de Jalisco
