= 2007–08 LNBP season =

2007−08 LNBP season
- Season: 8
- Dates: September 6, 2007 – March 13, 2008
- Teams: 24

Finals
- Champions: Halcones UV Xalapa
- Runners-up: Soles de Mexicali

Statistical leaders
Points	(United States) Kenya Capers	1034
Rebounds	(United States) Ramel Allen	563
Assists	(United States) Dallas Logan	292
Efficiency	(United States) Dallas Logan	1083

The 2007–08 LNBP was the 8th season of the Liga Nacional de Baloncesto Profesional, one of the professional basketball leagues of Mexico. The regular season began September 6, 2007 and ended on January 19, 2008. The playoffs ended on March 13, 2008. The league title was won by Halcones UV Xalapa, which defeated Soles de Mexicali in the championship series, 4–3.

== Format ==
24 teams participate. The teams are divided in two groups of 12 teams each, called Zonas (zones): Zona Norte (North) and Zona Sur (South). The first 8 teams in each group qualify for the playoffs. The group playoffs have quarterfinals (best-of-5), semifinals (best-of-7) and finals (best-of-7). The winner of each group series qualify for the championship series (best-of-7), named Final de Finales (Final of Finals).

== Teams ==
Team	City	State	Joined	Season No.
Algodoneros de la Comarca	Torreón	Coahuila	2000	8
Ángeles de Puebla	Puebla	Puebla	2007–08	1
Bravos de Piedras Negras	Piedras Negras	Coahuila	2007–08	1
Bucaneros de Campeche	Campeche City	Campeche	2006	2
Caballeros de Culiacán	Culiacán	Sinaloa	2007–08	1
Correcaminos UAT Victoria	Ciudad Victoria	Tamaulipas	2000	8
Dorados de Chihuahua	Chihuahua City	Chihuahua	2000	3
Fuerza Regia de Monterrey	Monterrey	Nuevo León	2001	7
Galgos de Tijuana	Tijuana	Baja California	2005	3
Guerreros de Morelia	Morelia	Michoacán	2006	2
Halcones UV Córdoba	Córdoba	Veracruz	2007–08	1
Halcones UV Veracruz	Veracruz	Veracruz	2005	3
Halcones UV Xalapa	Xalapa	Veracruz	2003	5
Lechugueros de León	León	Guanajuato	2004	4
Lobos de la UAdeC	Saltillo	Coahuila	2001	7
Lobos Grises de la UAD	Durango City	Durango	2005	3
Mayas de Yucatán	Mérida	Yucatán	2006	2
Panteras de Aguascalientes	Aguascalientes City	Aguascalientes	2003	5
Pioneros de Quintana Roo	Cancún	Quintana Roo	2006	2
Santos Reales de San Luis	San Luis Potosí City	San Luis Potosí	2003	5
Soles de Mexicali	Mexicali	Baja California	2005	3
Tecos de la UAG	Guadalajara	Jalisco	2001	6
Unión Zacatecas	Zacatecas City	Zacatecas	2007–08	1
Venados de Nuevo Laredo	Nuevo Laredo	Tamaulipas	2007–08	1

== Regular season ==
=== Zona Norte standings ===
Pos	Team	Pld	W	L	PF	PA	PD	Pts	Qualification
1	Lobos Grises de la UAD	48	37	11	4499	3998	+501	85	2007–08 LNBP playoffs
2	Fuerza Regia de Monterrey	48	33	15	4308	4122	+186	81	2007–08 LNBP playoffs
3	Soles de Mexicali	47	33	14	3834	3683	+151	80	2007–08 LNBP playoffs
4	Santos Reales de San Luis	48	31	17	4292	3941	+351	79	2007–08 LNBP playoffs
5	Correcaminos UAT Victoria	48	29	19	4131	4072	+59	77	2007–08 LNBP playoffs
6	Dorados de Chihuahua	48	27	21	4110	3931	+179	75	2007–08 LNBP playoffs
7	Galgos de Tijuana	48	27	21	3971	3933	+38	75	2007–08 LNBP playoffs
8	Algodoneros de la Comarca	48	26	22	4200	4166	+34	74	2007–08 LNBP playoffs
9	Unión Zacatecas	48	20	28	4132	4243	−111	68	
10	Lobos de la UAdeC	48	15	33	4188	4409	−221	63	
11	Venados de Nuevo Laredo	48	12	36	3779	4185	−406	60	
12	Bravos de Piedras Negras	48	11	37	4105	4433	−328	59	

Source: lnbp.com.mx

=== Zona Sur standings ===
Pos	Team	Pld	W	L	PF	PA	PD	Pts	Qualification
1	Halcones UV Xalapa	48	41	7	4660	4067	+593	89	2007–08 LNBP playoffs
2	Halcones UV Córdoba	48	31	17	4674	4407	+267	79	2007–08 LNBP playoffs
3	Tecos de la UAG	48	30	18	4017	3768	+249	78	2007–08 LNBP playoffs
4	Halcones Rojos Veracruz	48	25	23	4031	3996	+35	73	2007–08 LNBP playoffs
5	Pioneros de Quintana Roo	48	24	24	3881	3896	−15	72	2007–08 LNBP playoffs
6	Caballeros de Culiacán	48	23	25	4187	4184	+3	71	2007–08 LNBP playoffs
7	Lechugueros de León	47	23	24	3874	3841	+33	70	2007–08 LNBP playoffs
8	Panteras de Aguascalientes	48	22	26	3946	4132	−186	70	2007–08 LNBP playoffs
9	Bucaneros de Campeche	48	21	27	3957	3985	−28	69	
10	Mayas de Yucatán	48	18	30	3996	4173	−177	66	
11	Ángeles de Puebla	48	13	35	4003	4250	−247	61	
12	Guerreros de Morelia	48	1	47	1696	2616	−920	49	

Source: lnbp.com.mx

== Playoffs ==
First round
1	Lobos Grises	3
8	Algodoneros	2
4	Santos Reales	3
5	Correcaminos	0
2	Fuerza Regia	3
7	Galgos	2
3	Soles	3
6	Dorados	1
1	Halcones Xal.	3
8	Panteras	1
4	Halcones Rojos	3
5	Pioneros	1
2	Halcones Cor	3
7	Lechugeros	0
3	Tecolotes	3
6	Caballeros	2

Second round
1	Lobos Grises	2
4	Santos Reales	3
2	Fuerza Regia	1
3	Soles	3
1	Halcones Xal	3
4	Halcones Rojos	1
2	Halcones Cor	3
3	Tecolotes	1

Zone Finals
4	Santos Reales	0
3	Soles	4
1	Halcones Xal	4
2	Halcones Cor	1

Final
3	Soles	3
1	Halcones Xal	4

== All-Star Game ==
The 2007 LNBP All-Star Game was played in Nuevo Laredo on December 10, 2007, at 21:00 and was broadcast by TVC Deportes. The game was played between Zona Norte and Zona Sur, with no distinction between foreign and Mexican players. Zona Norte won, 123–113, in front of an attendance of 1,800 people.

=== Teams ===
Zona Norte

- (United States) Ramel Allen (Santos Reales de San Luis)
- (United States) Kenya Capers (Unión Zacatecas)
- (United States) Leroy Hickerson (Galgos de Tijuana)
- (United States) Robert Hornsby (Correcaminos UAT Victoria)
- (Mexico) Horacio Llamas (Soles de Mexicali)
- (Mexico) Richard López (Soles de Mexicali)
- (Mexico) Karim Malpica (Algodoneros de la Comarca)
- (Mexico) Sergio Sánchez (Lobos de la UAdeC)
- (United States) Alex Sanders (Venados de Nuevo Laredo)
- (Mexico) Arim Solares (Santos Reales de San Luis)
- (Mexico) Stephen Soriano (Correcaminos UAT Victoria)
- (United States) Antoine Stockman (Venados de Nuevo Laredo)
- (United States) Larry Taylor (Lobos Grises de la UAD)

- Coaches: (United States) Lewis LaSalle Taylor (Lobos Grises de la UAD) and (Argentina) Daniel Óscar Frola (Santos Reales de San Luis)

Zona Sur

- (United States) Harold Arceneaux (Lechugueros de León)
- (Mexico) Raymundo Castillo (Tecos de la UAG)
- (United States) Devon Ford (Panteras de Aguascalientes)
- (Mexico) Alonso Izaguirre (Halcones UV Veracruz)
- (United States) Dallas Logan (Halcones UV Córdoba)
- (United States) Nakiea Miller (Bucaneros de Campeche)
- (Mexico) Adam Parada (Tecos de la UAG)
- (United States) Cedric Patton (Caballeros de Culiacán)
- (United States) Galen Robinson (Pioneros de Quintana Roo)
- (Venezuela) Hernán Salcedo (Ángeles de Puebla)
- (Mexico) Enrique Zúñiga (Lechugueros de León)

- Coaches: (Mexico) Ángel González (Halcones UV Córdoba) and (Uruguay) Alberto Espasandín (Tecos de la UAG)
