= 2017–18 LNBP season =

Liga Nacional de Baloncesto Profesional
- Season: 2017–18
- Duration: 20 October 2017 – 2 March 2018 (Regular season); 6 March 2018 – April 2018 (Playoffs)
- Games played: 220
- Teams: 11

Regular season
- Season MVP: Juan Toscano-Anderson (Fuerza Regia)

Finals
- Champions: Soles de Mexicali (3rd title)
- Runners-up: Mexico City Capitanes

The 2017–18 LNBP season was the 18th season of the Liga Nacional de Baloncesto Profesional (LNBP). The regular season began on 20 October 2017 and ended on 2 March 2018. The playoffs began on 6 March and ended on 10 April 2018.

== Teams ==
=== Changes from last season ===
The league expanded to 11 teams for the 2017–18 season with the additions of the Aguacateros de Michoacán, Mexico City Capitanes and Libertadores de Querétaro.

During the offseason, the Barreteros de Zacatecas were renamed the Mineros de Zacatecas. Garzas de Plata UAEH left the league and Indios de Ciudad Juárez announced they were sitting out the current season.

=== Venues and locations ===
Locations of teams in 2017–18 LNBP

Team	Home city	Arena	Capacity
Abejas de León	León	Domo de la Feria	4,590
Aguacateros de Michoacán	Morelia	Auditorio de Usos Múltiples de la UMSNH	3,500
Mexico City Capitanes	Mexico City	Gimnasio Juan de la Barrera	5,243
Correcaminos UAT Victoria	Ciudad Victoria	Gimnasio Multidisciplinario UAT Victoria	2,200
Fuerza Regia de Monterrey	Monterrey	Gimnasio Nuevo León Independiente	5,000
Libertadores de Querétaro	Querétaro City	Auditorio General Arteaga	3,000
Mineros de Zacatecas	Zacatecas City	Gimnasio Profesor Marcelino González	3,500
Panteras de Aguascalientes	Aguascalientes City	Gimnasio Hermanos Carreón	3,000
Santos de San Luis	San Luis Potosí City	Auditorio Miguel Barragán	3,972
Soles de Mexicali	Mexicali	Auditorio del Estado	4,426
Toros de Nuevo Laredo	Nuevo Laredo	Polyforum Dr. Rodolfo Torre Cantú	5,224

== Regular season ==
=== Standings ===
Pos	Team	Pld	W	L	PF	PA	PD	Pts	Qualification
1	Soles	40	26	14	3576	3220	+356	66	LNBP Playoffs
2	Capitanes	40	26	14	3463	3243	+220	66	LNBP Playoffs
3	Fuerza Regia	40	25	15	3312	3125	+187	65	LNBP Playoffs
4	Mineros	40	25	15	3329	3267	+62	65	LNBP Playoffs
5	Aguacateros	40	22	18	3344	3245	+99	62	LNBP Playoffs
6	Toros	40	22	18	3438	3342	+96	62	LNBP Playoffs
7	Correcaminos	40	22	18	3535	3554	−19	62	LNBP Playoffs
8	Santos	40	19	21	3408	3489	−81	59	LNBP Playoffs
9	Abejas	40	13	27	3430	3727	−297	53	
10	Libertadores	40	11	29	3432	3720	−288	51	
11	Panteras	40	8	32	3339	3674	−335	48	

Source: lnbp.mx

== Playoffs ==
* – Denotes overtime period

Quarterfinals
1 Soles de Mexicali	87	79	93	79
8 C.B. Santos	75	94	71	76
4 Mineros de Zacatecas	95	96	64	113
5 Aguacateros de Michoacán	98*	86	68	125***
2 Mexico City Capitanes	81	91	90	79	86
7 Correcaminos UAT Victoria	86	58	92	74	74
3 Fuerza Regia	77	82	79	83	71
6 Toros de Nuevo Laredo	73	78	84	88	54

Semifinals
1 Soles de Mexicali	81	84	77	74	100	80
5 Aguacateros de Michoacán	83	72	70	88	96	76
2 Mexico City Capitanes	69	75	69	81	70
3 Fuerza Regia	68	62	83	80	68

Finals
1 Soles de Mexicali	4
2 Mexico City Capitanes	1

== All-Star Weekend ==
2017 LNBP All-Star Game
- Event: 2017 LNBP All Star Game
Foreigners	Mexico
(United Nations)	(Mexico)
136	163
	1	2	3	4	Total
Foreigners	32	41	32	31	136
Mexico	27	41	49	46	163
- Date: 3 September 2017
- Venue: Domo de la Feria, Mexico City
- Coaches: Ivan Deniz; Ramón Díaz
- Referees: Rubén Méndez; José Ayala; Omar Bermúdez
- Attendance: 4,463

The 2017 LNBP All-Star Game was an exhibition basketball game that was played on December 3, 2017, in León, Guanajuato at the Domo de la Feria, home of the Abejas de Guanajuato. It was the 20th edition of the event. The Mexicans won the game 163–136. The MVP of the game was Juan Toscano-Anderson, who scored 7 assists, the most ever scored by a player in an All-Star Game.

=== Location ===
There was a lot of speculation over the location of the game. Finally on October 12, Sergio Ganem, the league commissioner announced on a press conference that the chosen location was the Domo de la Feria in León, stating that the region deserved it because of its loyal fans. The commissioner of the LNBP, Sergio Ganem, considered that the All-Star Game will be a great event in a city like León, where basketball is important and in previous editions it had pronounced itself for being the venue. "It is a place that had already demanded in previous years through its president Alejandro Marcocchio the All-Star Game and I think it is a very wise decision to bring to León and Bajío the best basketball in Mexico," he said.

=== All-Star Game ===
==== Coaches ====
With the best record at the time, and also as an assistant coach in the National Team, Spaniard Ramón Díaz was selected as the coach for the Mexicans. The coach with the second best record, Iván Déniz, also Spanish, was selected as a coach for the foreigners.

==== Roster ====
Each roster is selected by a voting process which occurs on social networking sites, such as Twitter, or Facebook, and players selected by the coach of each side, and is composed of 14 players for each team. The Mexicans were led by Lorenzo Mata, Juan Toscano-Anderson, Pedro Meza, Edgar Garibay, and Israel Gutierrez, which were selected to be in the starting lineup. Toscano would end up being the game's MVP for a 2nd consecutive year.

Meanwhile, the foreigners were led by their starters who were: Dominicans Juan Coronado, and Emmanuel Ándujar, Puerto Rican Jonathan Rodríguez, and Americans Reggie Larry and Eugene Phelps.

Mexico's reserves included Fernando Benítez, Raúl Bórquez, Cezar Guerrero, P. J. Reyes, Irwin Ávalos, Ray Barreno, Michael Lizárraga, Roberto Nelson, Jaron Martín.

Mexicans

Player	Team
Israel Gutiérrez	Aguacateros de Michoacán
Juan Toscano-Anderson	Fuerza Regia de Monterrey
Lorenzo Mata	Soles de Mexicali
Pedro Meza	Mexico City Capitanes
Edgar Garibay	Abejas de León
Fernando Benítez	Mexico City Capitanes
Raúl Bórquez	Libertadores de Querétaro
Cezar Guerrero	Correcaminos UAT Victoria
P. J. Reyes	Mineros de Zacatecas
Irwin Ávalos	Santos de San Luis
Ray Barreno	Panteras de Aguascalientes
Michael Lizárraga	Abejas de León
Roberto Nelson	Toros de Nuevo Laredo
Jaron Martín	Panteras de Aguascalientes

- Coach: (Spain) Iván Déniz (Soles de Mexicali)
- Assistant: (Mexico) Luis García (Correcaminos UAT Victoria)

Foreigners

Player	Team
Juan Coronado	Aguacateros de Michoacán
Denis Clemente	Fuerza Regia de Monterrey
Mark Borders	Santos de San Luis
Eric McClellan	Mineros de Zacatecas
Steven Pledger	Abejas de León
Emmanuel Andújar	Mexico City Capitanes
Jonathan Rodríguez	Libertadores de Querétaro
Terrance King	Abejas de León
Eugene Phelps	Soles de Mexicali
Kennedy Jones Jr.	Correcaminos UAT Victoria
Reginald Larry	Abejas de León
Michael Glover	Panteras de Aguascalientes

- Coach: (Spain) Ramón Díaz (Mexico City Capitanes)
- Assistant: (Mexico) Gustavo Pacheco (Aguacateros de Michoacán)

=== Three Point Contest and Slam Dunk Contest ===
The American Steven Pledger of the Abejas de León won the contest of Shots of 3, when prevailing to the Puerto Rican Isaac Sosa of the Panteras de Aguascalientes in the final round. While Juan Toscano-Anderson of Fuerza Regia de Monterrey won the contest of Clavadas, defeating in the last round the American Terrance King of the Abejas de León.

=== Game ===
TDN

December 3, 2017
8:30 pm TC

Report

Foreigners 136, Mexicans 163
Scoring by quarter: 32-27, 41-41, 32-49, 41-46
Pts: Eugene Phelps 29; Rebs: Jonathan Rodríguez 6 Asts: Kennedy Jones Jr. 5	Pts: Cezar Guerrero 35; Rebs: Ray Barreno 6 Asts: Juan Toscano 7

Domo de la Feria, León, Guanajuato
Attendance: 4,463
Referees:
- Rubén Méndez
- José Ayala
- Omar Bermúdez

==== Three Point Contestants ====
1. Steven Pledger (Abejas)
2. Justin Ávalos (Santos)
3. Isaac Sosa (Panteras)
4. Eder Zúñiga (Abejas)
5. Emmanuel Andújar (Capitanes)
6. Mark Borders (Santos)

==== Slam Dunk Contestants ====
1. Juan Toscano-Anderson (Fuerza Regia)
2. P. J. Reyes (Mineros)
3. Terrance King (Abejas)
