= Will Funn =

American former professional basketball player

Personal information
- Born: March 13, 1982 (age 44) Rialto, California
- Listed height: 6 ft 2 in (1.88 m)
- Listed weight: 195 lb (88 kg)

Career information
- High school: Bloomington (Bloomington, California)
- College: San Bernardino Valley CC (2001–2003); Portland State (2003–2005)
- NBA draft: 2005: undrafted
- Playing career: 2005–2014
- Position: Point guard

Career history
- 2005–2007: Gallup Talons / Outlaws
- 2007: Salem Stampede
- 2007–2008: San Diego Wildcats
- 2008: Frayles de Guasave
- 2008–2009: Worcester Wolves
- 2009: Edmonton Energy
- 2009–2010: Bucaneros de Campeche
- 2010: Bucaneros de La Guaira
- 2010: Edmonton Energy
- 2010–2011: Politekhnika-Halychyna
- 2011: Frayles de Guasave
- 2011–2012: Lechugueros de Leon
- 2012: CSU Sibiu
- 2012: Santa Barbara Breakers
- 2012: Pioneros de Los Mochis
- 2013: Lechugueros de Leon
- 2013: Halifax Rainmen
- 2014: Club Deportivo Mavort

Career highlights
- 2× LNBP assists leader (2010, 2012); NCAA assists co-leader (2005)

William Elijah Funn (born March 13, 1982) is an American former professional basketball player. In 2005, he led the NCAA Division I in assists per game, with 8.0, and helped Portland State win the Big Sky Conference championship. Funn then played in the American Basketball Association and was named an All-Star in 2006 and 2007.

== See also ==
- List of NCAA Division I men's basketball season assists leaders
