= Enrique Zúñiga =

Mexican basketball player (born 1976)

Ángeles de la Ciudad de México
- Position: Head coach
- League: CIBACOPA

Personal information
- Born: 7 July 1976 (age 50) Guadalajara, Jalisco, Mexico

Career information
- College: Leones Negros UdeG (1992–1995); Arizona Western (1995–1997); Grand Canyon (1997–1999)
- Playing career: 1999–2015
- Coaching career: 2019–present

Career history

Playing
- 1999–2003: Soles de Jalisco
- 2004: Dombovar KC
- 2005: BC Körmend
- 2005–2008: Lechugeros de León
- 2008–2009: Pioneros de Quintana Roo
- 2010: Panteras de Aguascalientes
- 2010–2012: Lechugeros de León
- 2012–2013: Osos de Guadalajara
- 2013–2014: Gigantes del Estado de México
- 2014: Barreteros de Zacatecas
- 2015: Jefes de Fuerza Lagunera

Coaching
- 2019: Mexico U-17
- 2022: Manzaneros de Cuauhtémoc
- 2022: Borregos Salvajes Puebla
- 2023: Fukushima Firebonds
- 2024: Tijuana Zonkeys
- 2024: Fuerza Guinda de Nogales
- 2025: Indios de Ciudad Juárez
- 2025: Frayles de Guasave
- 2025: Gambusinos de Fresnillo
- 2025: Abejas de León
- 2026–present: Ángeles de la Ciudad de México

Career highlights
- 3× CIMEBA champion (2000–2002)

Enrique Alejandro Zúñiga Castro (born 7 July 1976) is a Mexican professional basketball coach and former player who is the head coach of the Tijuana Zonkeys of the Circuito de Baloncesto de la Costa del Pacífico (CIBACOPA). Born in Guadalajara, Mexico, he played college basketball at Arizona Western and Grand Canyon University. Zúñiga spent the majority of his professional career in Mexico. He was also a member of the Mexico national basketball team.

== Early life and college career ==
Zúñiga was born on 7 July 1976 in Guadalajara, Jalisco. He began playing basketball at the age of eight. Zúñiga played college basketball at Arizona Western College and Grand Canyon University. In October 1997, he helped the Grand Canyon Antelopes capture the 'Lopes Shootout Invitational title by making the game-winning three-pointer in their championship game win over Chapman. Zúñiga earned honorable mention all-California Collegiate Athletic Association (CCAA) honors both in 1998 and 1999. He later helped Team Mexico to a fourth-place finish at the 1999 Summer Universiade held in Spain.

== Professional playing career ==
At age 15, Zúñiga made his professional debut as a member of the Leones Negros de la UdeG of the Circuito Mexicano de Básquetbol (CIMEBA). He then played for the Soles de Jalisco, helping them win three straight CIMEBA titles from 2000 to 2002.

In 2002, Zúñiga played with the Phoenix Eclipse of the American Basketball Association (ABA), where he was a teammate of compatriot Horacio Llamas. He had a brief spell for two teams in Hungary with Dombóvár KC and BC Körmend in 2004 and 2005, respectively. His best season, based on averages, was his first season for Lechugueros de León (2005–06), in which he averaged 18.6 points and 3.4 assists per game. Zúñiga returned to the ABA as a member of the Tijuana Dragons, where he was a teammate of Dennis Rodman. Zúñiga had another successful season for the Lechugueros de Leó in 2007-08, averaging 18.2 points per game. Midway through the 2008-09 season, he moved to Pioneros de Quintana Roo, where he began the 2009-10 season. Zúñiga signed with the Tijuana Zonkeys of the Circuito de Baloncesto de la Costa del Pacífico (CIBACOPA) ahead of their inaugural 2010 season.

Zúñiga joined the Barreteros de Zacatecas for the 2014–15 LNBP season. He signed with the Jefes de Fuerza Lagunera in January 2015. Zúñiga announced his retirement as a player in 2016 to focus on youth coaching. He was inducted into the Jalisco Basketball Hall of Fame.

== National team career ==
Zúñiga was a long-time member of the Mexico national basketball team. He first competed with the team at the 2003 Centrobasket, and subsequently competed for the team at the 2004 Centrobasket and 2006 Centrobasket and the FIBA Americas Championship in 2005, 2007, and 2009.

== Coaching career ==
In December 2021, Zúñiga was hired as the head coach of the Manzaneros de Cuauhtémoc of the Liga de Básquetbol Estatal de Chihuahua (LBE) ahead of the 2022 LBE season. He was hired at the collegiate level in April 2022 as head coach of the Borregos Puebla. In April 2023, Zúñiga was hired as an assistant coach for the Fukushima Firebonds in Japan towards the end of the 2022–23 season. He took over as head coach the following season.

On 9 January 2024, Zúñiga was hired as the head coach of the Tijuana Zonkeys.
