= Orlando Méndez-Valdez =

American basketball player (born 1986)

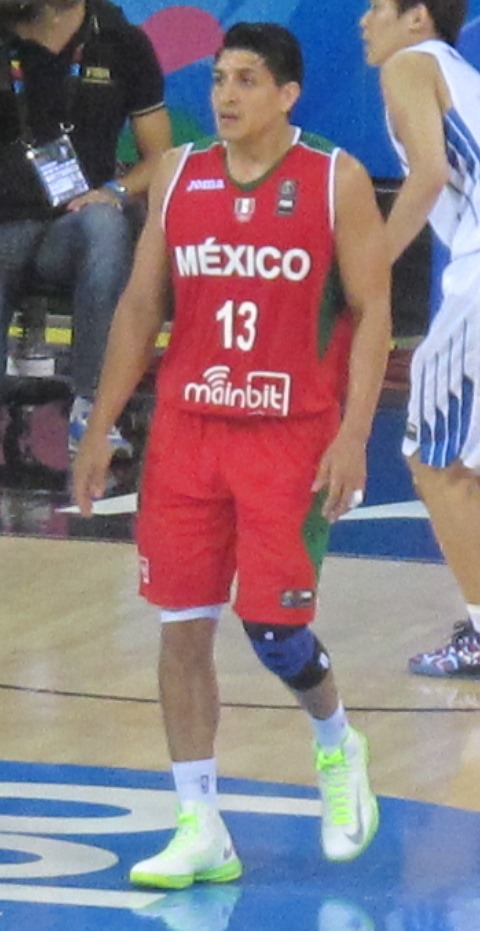
- Méndez-Valdez with Mexico in 2014

Mexico City Capitanes
- Position: General manager
- League: NBA G League

Personal information
- Born: April 29, 1986 (age 40) San Antonio, Texas, U.S.
- Listed height: 6 ft 0 in (1.83 m)
- Listed weight: 185 lb (84 kg)

Career information
- High school: Lanier (San Antonio, Texas); Charis Prep (Goldsboro, North Carolina)
- College: Western Kentucky (2005–2009)
- NBA draft: 2009: undrafted
- Playing career: 2009–2023
- Number: 13, 33

Career history
- 2009–2012: Halcones de Xalapa
- 2012: Pioneros de Quintana Roo
- 2012–2015: Halcones de Xalapa
- 2015–2016: Pioneros de Quintana Roo
- 2016–2017: Maccabi Haifa
- 2017–2019: Soles de Mexicali
- 2019–2020: Capitanes de la Ciudad de México
- 2020: Mineros de Zacatecas
- 2021–2022: Plateros de Fresnillo
- 2022: Peñarol
- 2022–2023: Mexico City Capitanes

Career highlights
- FIBA Americas League champion (2012); 3× LNBP champion (2010, 2016, 2018); LNBP Finals MVP (2018); 3× LNBP All-Star 3-point champion; 10× LNBP All-Star; LNBP Rookie of the year (2010); AP Honorable mention All-American (2009); Sun Belt Player of the Year (2009); First-team All-Sun Belt (2009); Sun Belt Male Athlete of the year (2009)
Medals
Men's basketball
Representing Mexico
Pan American Games
Silver medal – second place	2011 Guadalajara
FIBA AmeriCup
Gold medal – first place	2013 Venezuela

Orlando Homer Méndez-Valdez (born April 29, 1986) is an American-born Mexican former professional basketball player who is currently the General manager of the Mexico City Capitanes of the NBA G League. He played college basketball for the Western Kentucky Hilltoppers.

== High school career ==
Mendez-Valdez attended Lanier High School in San Antonio, Texas, where he graduated in 2004. He was named the San Antonio Player of the year his senior year and first team All State honors, and his jersey number was retired in 2009.

Mendez-Valdez attended prep school at Charis Prep in Goldsboro, North Carolina. He won the MVP award in the Bull City Classic, and led the team to a championship at the tournament.

== College career ==
At the collegiate level, Mendez-Valdez played for Western Kentucky University from 2005 to 2009. He was a member of the 2008 Sweet Sixteen team which included Courtney Lee, Tyrone Brazelton, Ty Rogers, and Boris Siakam. In 2009, he was named the Sun Belt Conference Men's Basketball Player of the Year, and the Sun Belt Conference Male Athlete of the Year. In addition, he received All-American accolades, and recorded the first-ever triple double in Western Kentucky history.

== Professional career ==
After failing to be drafted in the 2009 NBA draft, he played professional basketball in the LNBP from 2009 to 2016. On September 14, 2016, Mendez-Valdez signed with the Israeli team Maccabi Haifa for the 2016–17 season. During his season with the club, Mendez-Valdez won the Three-Point Shootout contest in the Israeli League All-Star event, he also helped Haifa reaching the Israeli League Finals.

He returned to the LNBP on August 25, 2017, signing with Soles de Mexicali for the 2017–18 season.

=== Mexico City Capitanes (2022–2023) ===
On November 4, 2022, Méndez was named to the opening night roster for the Mexico City Capitanes. On January 7, 2023, Méndez-Valdez was waived. On January 19, 2023, Méndez-Valdez was reacquired by the Capitanes de la Ciudad de México.

Méndez-Valdez retired after the end of the 2023 FIBA Basketball World Cup.

== National team career ==
In 2013, Mendez-Valdez helped lead Mexico to victory in the gold medal game against Puerto Rico at the FIBA Americas Championship.

== Honours ==
- Pan American Games 2011 Silver Medal
- FIBA COCABA Championship 2013 Gold Medal
- FIBA Americas Championship 2013 Gold Medal
- Centrobasket 2016 Silver Medal
