= Francisco Martínez (basketball) =

Mexican basketball player

Personal information
- Born: June 20, 1910 Ciudad Juárez, Mexico
- Died: December 1, 1993 (aged 83) El Paso, Texas

Career information
- High school: El Paso (El Paso, Texas)
- College: New Mexico State (1936–1939)
- Position: Guard

Career highlights
- 2x first team All-Border Conference (1938–1939)

Francisco "Kiko" Martínez Cordero (June 20, 1910 – December 1, 1993) was a Mexican basketball player. He competed in the 1936 Summer Olympics.

Born in Ciudad Juárez, Martínez was part of the Mexican basketball team that won the bronze medal. He played in six of the squad's matches.

Following his Olympic experience, Martínez played college basketball at New Mexico A&M University (now New Mexico State University). He played at the school from 1936 to 1939, earning first team All-Border Conference in 1938 and 1939. As a senior, he led the Aggies to the 1939 National Invitation Tournament in New York City.

Martínez' grandson Román Martínez also represented Mexico as a part of the 2013 FIBA Americas Championship. Mexico won the gold medal, qualifying for the 2014 FIBA Basketball World Cup in Spain.
