= Guerreros de Morelia =

Guerreros de Morelia was a team in Morelia, Michoacán, Mexico playing in the Liga Nacional de Baloncesto Profesional (LNBP). Their home arena was Gimnasio Michoacana.

The team joined the LNBP in 2006. In 2007–08, they finished in last place after winning one out of 48 games.

The Guerreros would be the last professional basketball team to play in the state of Michoacán until the Aguacateros de Michoacán joined the LNBP in 2017.
