= Centro de Convenciones de Tampico =

The Centro de Convenciones de Tampico (English: Tampico Convention Center) is an 8,500-seat indoor arena and convention center located in Tampico, Tamaulipas, Mexico. It was built in 2009. It is used primarily for concerts, trade shows, conventions and sporting events.

The main exhibit hall features 9,000 square meters (96,875 square feet) of exhibit space and is notable on the outside for its arched roof, which is high enough to accommodate not just conventions and concerts but also sporting events. The roof at its peak stands at a height of 12 meters (39.5 feet). There are 11 meeting rooms totaling 2,902 square meters (31,237 square feet).

The first entertainment act at the Centro de Convenciones was Plácido Domingo. Many other entertainment acts will be announced in the near future.
