= Román Martínez (basketball) =

American-born Mexican basketball player

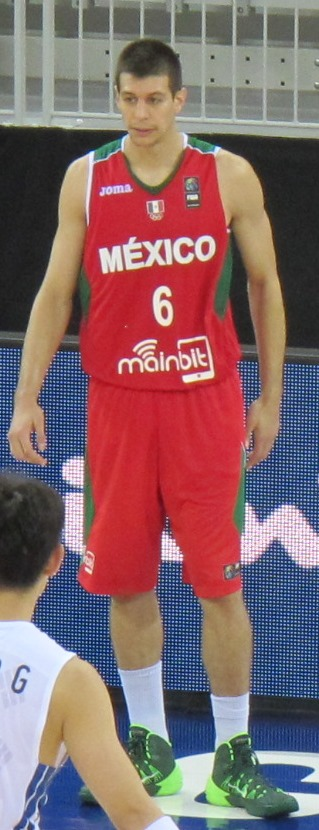

Personal information
- Born: March 5, 1988 (age 38) El Paso, Texas, U.S.
- Listed height: 6 ft 7 in (2.01 m)

Career information
- High school: Montwood (El Paso, Texas)
- College: New Mexico (2006–2010)
- NBA draft: 2010: undrafted
- Playing career: 2010–present
- Position: Small forward

Career history
- 2010–2011: La Palma
- 2011: Gran Canaria
- 2011–2012: La Palma
- 2012–2014: Soles de Mexicali
- 2014: Andorra
- 2014–2022: Soles de Mexicali
- 2023: Halcones de Xalapa

Career highlights
- Second-team Academic All-American (2010); Chip Hilton Player of the Year (2010); Second-team All-MWC (2010)

Román Eduardo Martínez (born March 5, 1988) is an American-born Mexican basketball player for Soles de Mexicali and the Mexico national team, where he participated at the 2014 FIBA Basketball World Cup.

Martinez' grandfather Francisco Martínez competed for Mexico in the 1936 Olympic Games.
