= Liga Nacional de Baloncesto Profesional =

Sports league

National Professional Basketball League
- Current season, competition or edition: 2026 LNBP season
- Sport: Basketball
- Founded: March 11, 2000; 26 years ago
- Commissioner: Alonso Izaguirre
- Motto: Cree en tu juego (Believe in your game)
- No. of teams: 14
- Country: Mexico
- Headquarters: Mexico City, Mexico
- Continent: FIBA Americas
- Most recent champions: Fuerza Regia de Monterrey (6th title)
- Most titles: Fuerza Regia de Monterrey (6 titles)
- Broadcasters: AYM Sports; Basket América TV; Canal 26; Canal 66; Capital 21; Heraldo Televisión; Hi Sports; Multimedios; Nación Deportes; Televisa; TV4; TVC Deportes
- Website: LNBP.mx

The National Professional Basketball League (Spanish: Liga Nacional de Baloncesto Profesional or LNBP), officially known as the Liga Caliente LNBP for sponsorship reasons, is the top professional basketball league in Mexico. The league was founded in 2000 with 10 teams.

Notable basketball players who have played in the league include Jamario Moon, Dennis Rodman and Sun Mingming, among many others.

== History ==
=== Foundation ===
In January 2000, some teams of CIMEBA (Circuito Mexicano de Básquetbol), the national basketball league in Mexico at the time, exited the league, citing CIMEBA's financial difficulties, and decided to form a new league. On March 11, 2000 the league was founded in the city of Durango with 11 teams participating. These were the founding teams, with the respective city and state:

- Algodoneros de la Comarca (Torreon, Coahuila)
- Correcaminos Matamoros de la UAT (Matamoros, Tamaulipas)
- Correcaminos Reynosa de la UAT (Reynosa, Tamaulipas)
- Correcaminos Tampico de la UAT (Tampico, Tamaulipas)
- Correcaminos Victoria de la UAT (Ciudad Victoria, Tamaulipas)
- Dorados de Chiuhuahua (Chihuahua, Chihuahua)
- Garzas de Plata de la UAEH (Pachuca, Hidalgo)
- Indios de la UACJ (Ciudad Juárez, Chihuahua)
- La Ola Roja del Distrito Federal (Mexico City, Distrito Federal)
- Osos de Saltillo (Saltillo, Coahuila)
- Vaqueros de Agua Prieta (Agua Prieta, Sonora)

The first president was Modesto Robledo. The LNBP set out to support and develop professional basketball in Mexico. The first edition of the league started on August 7, 2000 and finished in December, with the regular season finishing on November 11 and the playoffs starting on November 14. The first game was played in Torreón between Algodoneros de Torreón and Dorados de Chihuahua at the Auditorio Municipal: Dorados won, 80–78. The league coexisted in its first seasons with CIMEBA.

== Format ==
=== Regular season ===
The regular season is played in round-robin format in which the 8 best-placed teams qualify to the postseason. For every game won 2 points are added and for every game lost one point is added. For example: If team one played 10 games and won 7, losing the remaining 3, it would have 17 points; 14 points for the 7 games won and 3 points for the games lost.

=== Playoffs ===
The eight top-seeded teams play each other. The 1st-placed team plays the 8th-place team while the 2nd plays the 7th and the 3rd plays the 6th and so on. The semi-finals are played like the quarterfinals while the Serie Final is played by the two teams remaining with the best-placed team having home field advantage.

== Teams ==
Location of the 2026 LNBP teams

| Team | City | Arena | Capacity | Founded | Joined | Head coach |
|---|---|---|---|---|---|---|
| Abejas de León | León, Guanajuato | Domo de la Feria | 4,463 | 2009 | | (Puerto Rico) Jean Serrano |
| Astros de Jalisco | Guadalajara, Jalisco | Arena Astros | 4,000 | 2019 | | (Spain) Iván Déniz |
| El Calor de Cancún | Cancún, Quintana Roo | Polifórum Benito Juárez | 4,800 | 2024 | | (Argentina) Néstor García |
| Correbasket UAT | Ciudad Victoria, Tamaulipas | Gimnasio Multidisciplinario UAT Victoria | 2,600 | 2000 | 2022 | (United States) Lewis LaSalle Taylor |
| Diablos Rojos del México | Benito Juárez, Mexico City | Gimnasio Olímpico Juan de la Barrera | 5,242 | 2024 | | (Brazil) Gustavo de Conti |
| Dorados de Chihuahua | Chihuahua City, Chihuahua | Gimnasio Manuel Bernardo Aguirre | 9,600 | 2000 | 2019 | (Spain) Jorge Elorduy |
| Freseros de Irapuato | Irapuato, Guanajuato | Inforum Irapuato | 3,000 | 2023 | | (Venezuela) Christopher Gutiérrez |
| Fuerza Regia de Monterrey | Monterrey, Nuevo León | Arena Mobil | 5,000 | 2001 | | (Brazil) José Neto |
| Gambusinos de Fresnillo | Fresnillo, Zacatecas | Gimnasio Nico Varela | 4,500 | 2002 | 2025 | (Argentina) Elian Villafañe |
| Lobos de Puebla | Puebla City, Puebla | Gimnasio Miguel Hidalgo | 4,000 | 2004 | 2026 | (Spain) Paco Olmos |
| Mineros de Zacatecas | Zacatecas City, Zacatecas | Gimnasio Marcelino González | 3,458 | 2017 | 2022 | (Argentina) Facundo Müller |
| Panteras de Aguascalientes | Aguascalientes City, Aguascalientes | Auditorio Hermanos Carreón | 3,000 | 2003 | 2023 | (Spain) José Antonio Santaella |
| Santos del Potosí | San Luis Potosí City, San Luis Potosí | Auditorio Miguel Barragán | 3,400 | 2003 | 2023 | (Canada) Doug Plumb |
| Soles de Mexicali | Mexicali, Baja California | Auditorio PSF | 4,779 | 2005 | | (Spain) Pablo García |

== List of champions ==
| Season | Champion | Result | Runner-up |
|---|---|---|---|
| 2000 | Correcaminos UAT Tampico | 4–2 | Correcaminos UAT Victoria |
| 2001 | Gallos de Pelea de Ciudad Juárez | 4–1 | Lobos UAdeC |
| 2002 | Correcaminos UAT Victoria | 4–3 | Correcaminos UAT Matamoros |
| 2003 | Panteras de Aguascalientes | 4–2 | La Ola Roja del Distrito Federal |
| 2004 | Santos de San Luis | 4–2 | Halcones de Xalapa |
| 2005 | Halcones de Xalapa | 4–1 | Lobos UAdeC |
| 2006 | Soles de Mexicali | 4–3 | Halcones de Xalapa |
| 2007–08 | Halcones de Xalapa | 4–3 | Soles de Mexicali |
| 2008–09 | Halcones de Xalapa | 4–2 | Soles de Mexicali |
| 2009–10 | Halcones de Xalapa | 4–1 | Halcones Rojos Veracruz |
| 2010–11 | Toros de Nuevo Laredo | 4–2 | Pioneros de Quintana Roo |
| 2011–12 | Halcones Rojos Veracruz | 4–1 | Toros de Nuevo Laredo |
| 2012–13 | Toros de Nuevo Laredo | 4–2 | Halcones de Xalapa |
| 2013–14 | Halcones Rojos Veracruz | 4–3 | Pioneros de Quintana Roo |
| 2014–15 | Soles de Mexicali | 4–1 | Pioneros de Quintana Roo |
| 2015–16 | Pioneros de Quintana Roo | 4–3 | Soles de Mexicali |
| 2016–17 | Fuerza Regia de Monterrey | 4–2 | Soles de Mexicali |
| 2017–18 | Soles de Mexicali | 4–1 | Capitanes de la Ciudad de México |
| 2018–19 | Fuerza Regia de Monterrey | 4–2 | Capitanes de la Ciudad de México |
| 2019–20 | Soles de Mexicali | 4–3 | Fuerza Regia de Monterrey |
| 2020 | Fuerza Regia de Monterrey | 3–1 | Aguacateros de Michoacán |
| 2021 | Fuerza Regia de Monterrey | 4–0 | Astros de Jalisco |
| 2022 | Abejas de León | 4–0 | Astros de Jalisco |
| 2023 | Fuerza Regia de Monterrey | 4–1 | Astros de Jalisco |
| 2024 | Diablos Rojos del México | 4–1 | Halcones de Xalapa |
| 2025 | Fuerza Regia de Monterrey | 4–1 | Diablos Rojos del México |

== Championships ==
| Team | Championship | Runner-up | Year(s) won |
|---|---|---|---|
| Fuerza Regia de Monterrey | 6 | 1 | 2016–17, 2018–19, 2020, 2021, 2023, 2025 |
| Soles de Mexicali | 4 | 4 | 2006, 2014–15, 2017–18, 2019–20 |
| Halcones de Xalapa | 4 | 4 | 2005, 2007–08, 2008–09, 2009–10 |
| Halcones Rojos Veracruz | 2 | 1 | 2011–12, 2013–14 |
| Toros de Nuevo Laredo | 2 | 1 | 2010–11, 2012–13 |
| Pioneros de Quintana Roo | 1 | 3 | 2015–16 |
| Diablos Rojos del México | 1 | 1 | 2024 |
| Correcaminos UAT Victoria | 1 | 1 | 2002 |
| Correcaminos UAT Tampico | 1 | 0 | 2000 |
| Gallos de Pelea de Ciudad Juárez | 1 | 0 | 2001 |
| Panteras de Aguascalientes | 1 | 0 | 2003 |
| Santos de San Luis | 1 | 0 | 2004 |
| Abejas de León | 1 | 0 | 2022 |
| Astros de Jalisco | 0 | 3 | |
| Capitanes de la Ciudad de México | 0 | 2 | |
| Lobos UAdeC | 0 | 2 | |
| Aguacateros de Michoacán | 0 | 1 | |
| Correcaminos UAT Matamoros | 0 | 1 | |
| Ola Roja del Distrito Federal | 0 | 1 | |

== Copa Independencia winners ==
The Copa Independencia (Independence Cup) was a tournament created by the LNBP.

| Season | Champion | Runner-up |
|---|---|---|
| 2004 | Lobos UAdeC | Lechugueros de León |
| 2005 | Lobos UAdeC | Correcaminos UAT Victoria |
| 2006 | Lobos Grises UAD | Halcones de Xalapa |
| 2007–08 | Lobos Grises UAD | Halcones Rojos Veracruz |

== Copa Value winners ==
The Copa Value is the new Cup tournament established by the LNBP. Replacing the annual All-Star Game.

| Season | Champion | Runner-up |
|---|---|---|
| 2023 | Fuerza Regia de Monterrey | Libertadores de Querétaro |
| 2024 | Halcones de Xalapa | Diablos Rojos del México |
| 2025 | Soles de Mexicali | Diablos Rojos del México |
| 2026 | Mineros de Zacatecas | Astros de Jalisco |

== Top-scorers ==
=== Per game ===
| Season | Player | PPG | Team |
|---|---|---|---|
| 2000 | | | |
| 2001 | (United States) M.Johnson | 26.8 | Matamoros Piratas Bagdad |
| 2002 | | | |
| 2003 | (United States) Devon Ford | 36.5 | Panteras de Aguascalientes |
| 2004 | (United States) Devon Ford | 36.5 | Panteras de Aguascalientes |
| 2005 | (United States) Ryan Moore | 24.8 | |
| 2006 | | | |
| 2007–08 | (United States) Devon Ford | 27.9 | Panteras de Aguascalientes |
| 2008–09 | (United States) Devon Ford (4) | 26.0 | Panteras de Aguascalientes |
| 2009–10 | (United States) John Millsap | 25.4 | Bucaneros de Campeche |
| 2010–11 | (Puerto Rico) Ricardo Melendez | 24.9 | Panteras de Aguascalientes |
| 2011–12 | (United States) Majic Dorsey | 30.5 | Águilas Rojas de San Juan del Río |
| 2012–13 | (United States) Shannon Shorter | 27.7 | Gansos Salvajes |
| 2013–14 | (Puerto Rico) Alejandro Carmona | 25.3 | |
| 2014–15 | (United States) Ollie Bailey | 25.4 | |
| 2015–16 | (United States) Brandon Davis | 25.7 | Bucaneros de Campeche |
| 2016–17 | (United States) Justin Keenan | 24.1 | Soles de Mexicali |
| 2017–18 | (Puerto Rico) Jonathan Rodríguez | 27.0 | Libertadores de Querétaro |
| 2018–19 | (United States) Stedmon Lemon | 23.85 | Panteras de Aguascalientes |
| 2019–20 | (United States) John Taylor | 23.9 | Laguneros de La Comarca |
| 2020 | (United States) Stedmon Lemon (2) | 26.7 | Libertadores de Querétaro |
| 2021 | (United States) Vander Blue | 22.2 | Libertadores de Querétaro |
| 2022 | (United States) Donald Sims | 24.3 | Dorados de Chihuahua |
| 2023 | (United States) Myke Henry | 21.0 | Libertadores de Querétaro |
| 2024 | (United States) Deshawndre Washington | 23.7 | Halcones Rojos Veracruz |
| 2025 | (United States) Michael Bryson | 17.5 | Gambusinos de Fresnillo |

Source: latinbasket.com

=== By total points ===
| Season | Player | Points | Team |
|---|---|---|---|
| 2000 | | | |
| 2001 | (United States) Samuel Bowie | 927 | |
| 2002 | | | |
| 2003 | (United States) Devon Ford | 1502 | Panteras de Aguascalientes |
| 2004 | (United States) Devon Ford | | Panteras de Aguascalientes |
| 2005 | (United States) Ryan Moore | 993 | Galgos de Tijuana |
| 2006 | (United States) Devon Ford | 961 | Panteras de Aguascalientes |
| 2007–08 | (United States) Kenya Capers | 1034 | |
| 2008–09 | (United States) Devon Ford (4) | 1196 | Panteras de Aguascalientes |
| 2009–10 | (United States) John Millsap | 1000 | Bucaneros de Campeche |
| 2010–11 | (Puerto Rico) Ricardo Melendez | 696 | Panteras de Aguascalientes |
| 2011–12 | (United States) Daryl Dorsey | 762 | Águilas Rojas de San Juan del Río |
| 2012–13 | (Puerto Rico) Ricardo Melendez (2) | 1023 | Panteras de Aguascalientes |
| 2013–14 | (Puerto Rico) Alejandro Carmona | 976 | Panteras de Aguascalientes |
| 2014–15 | (United States) Steffphon Pettigrew | 832 | Abejas de León |

Source: latinbasket.com

=== Players with most awards ===
| Player | Awards | Years |
|---|---|---|
| (United States) Devon Ford | 4 | 2003, 2004, 2006, 2009 |
| (Puerto Rico) Ricardo Melendez | 2 | 2011, 2013 |
| (United States) Stedmon Lemon | 2 | 2019, 2020 |

== Awards ==
=== MVP ===
| Season | Player | Team |
|---|---|---|
| 2005 | (United States) Justin Aronel Howard | Fuerza Regia de Monterrey |
| 2006 | (United States) Gregory Devon Lewis | Soles de Mexicali |
| 2007–08 | (United States) Ramel Kinte Allen | Santos del Potosí |
| 2008–09 | (United States) Devon Ford | Panteras de Aguascalientes |
| 2009–10 | (Uruguay) Leandro García Morales | Halcones Xalapa |
| 2010–11 | (United States) Mike Smith | Lechugueros de León |
| 2011–12 | (United States) Daryl Dorsey | Águilas Rojas de San Juan del Río |
| 2012–13 | (United States) Leroy Edjuan Hickerson | Halcones Xalapa |
| 2013–14 | (Puerto Rico) Renaldo Balkman | Halcones Xalapa |
| 2014–15 | (United Kingdom) (Ghana) Matthew Bryan-Amaning | Soles de Mexicali |
| 2015–16 | (United Kingdom) (Ghana) Matthew Bryan-Amaning (2) | Soles de Mexicali |
| 2016–17 | (United States) Justin Keenan | Soles de Mexicali |
| 2017–18 | (United States) Eugene Phelps | Soles de Mexicali |
| 2018–19 | (Dominican Republic) Rigoberto Mendoza | Capitanes de Ciudad de México |
| 2019–20 | (Mexico) (United States) Luke Martínez | Soles de Mexicali |
| 2020 | (United States) Eric Dawson (United States) Jerome Meyinsse | Mineros de Zacatecas; Aguacateros de Michoacán |
| 2021 | (United States) Durrell Summers (United States) Vander Blue | Dorados de Chihuahua; Libertadores de Querétaro |
| 2022 | (United States) Donald Sims (Mexico) Jorge Gutiérrez | Dorados de Chihuahua; Astros de Jalisco |
| 2023 | (Mexico) (United States) Joshua Ibarra (United States) Shaquille Johnson | Plateros de Fresnillo; Halcones de Xalapa |
| 2024 | (Dominican Republic) Rigoberto Mendoza (2) (Mexico) Fabián Jaimes | Capitanes de Ciudad de México; Panteras de Aguascalientes |
| 2025 | (United States) Donald Sims (2) (Mexico) Gabriel Girón | Soles de Mexicali; Halcones Xalapa |

Source: latinbasket.com

=== Finals MVP ===
| Season | Player | Team |
|---|---|---|
| 2014–15 | (United States) (Mexico) Román Martínez | Soles de Mexicali |
| 2015–16 | (Mexico) Héctor Hernández | Pioneros de Quintana Roo |
| 2016–17 | (Mexico) (United States) Juan Toscano-Anderson | Fuerza Regia de Monterrey |
| 2017–18 | (Mexico) (United States) Orlando Méndez-Valdez | Soles de Mexicali |
| 2018–19 | (Puerto Rico) David Huertas | Fuerza Regia de Monterrey |
| 2019–20 | (Mexico) (United States) Luke Martínez | Soles de Mexicali |
| 2020 | (Mexico) (United States) J. J. Avila | Fuerza Regia de Monterrey |
| 2021 | (Mexico) Cristian Cortés | Fuerza Regia de Monterrey |
| 2022 | (United States) Michael Smith | Abejas de León |
| 2023 | (Mexico) Daniel Bejarano | Fuerza Regia de Monterrey |
| 2024 | (United States) Avry Holmes | Diablos Rojos del México |
| 2025 | (United States) Scott Bamforth | Fuerza Regia de Monterrey |

== Former teams ==
- Aguacateros de Michoacán
- Águilas Rojas de San Juan del Río
- Ángeles de Puebla
- Algodoneros de la Comarca
- Ángeles Guerreros de Acapulco
- Astros de Tecate
- Barreteros de Zacatecas
- Bravos de Piedras Negras
- Bucaneros de Campeche
- Caballeros de Culiacán
- Capitanes de la Ciudad de México
- Cimarrones de Ensenada
- Cometas de Querétaro
- Coras de Nayarit
- Correcaminos UAT Matamoros
- Correcaminos UAT Reynosa
- Correcaminos UAT Tampico
- Cosmos de Tijuana
- Estrellas Indebasquet del Distrito Federal
- Gallos de Pelea de Ciudad Juárez
- Gansos Salvajes UIC
- Garzas de Plata UAEH
- Garzas Guerreras UATX
- Gigantes del Estado de México
- Guerreros de Guerrero Cumple
- Guerreros de Morelia
- Guerreros del Norte
- Halcones de Xalapa
- Halcones Rojos Veracruz
- Halcones UV Córdoba
- Huracanes de Tampico
- Indios de Ciudad Juárez
- Indios UACJ
- Jaguares de la Bahía
- Jefes de Fuerza Lagunera
- Laguneros de La Comarca
- Lechugueros de León
- Leñadores de Durango
- Libertadores de Querétaro
- Lobos UAdeC
- Lobos Grises UAD
- Loros UdeC
- Mayas de Yucatán
- Navegantes de Ensenada
- Ola Roja del Distrito Federal
- Ola Verde de Poza Rica
- Osos de Guadalajara
- Petroleros de Ciudad del Carmen
- Pilares del Distrito Federal
- Pioneros de Quintana Roo
- Plateros de Fresnillo
- Potros ITSON de Obregón
- Tecolotes UAG
- Titanes Capital del Distrito Federal
- Titánicos de León
- Toros de Nuevo Laredo
- Tuberos de Colima
- Unión Zacatecas
- Vaqueros de Agua Prieta
- Volcanes del Estado de México
- Zorros UMSNH

== See also ==
- LNBP All-Star Game
- Liga Mexicana de Básquetbol CIBACOPA
- CIMEBA
