= Domo de la Feria =

Arena in Guanajuato

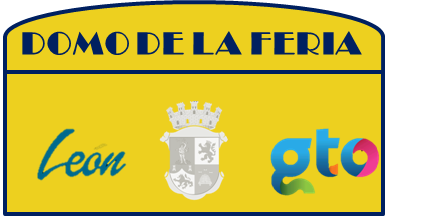

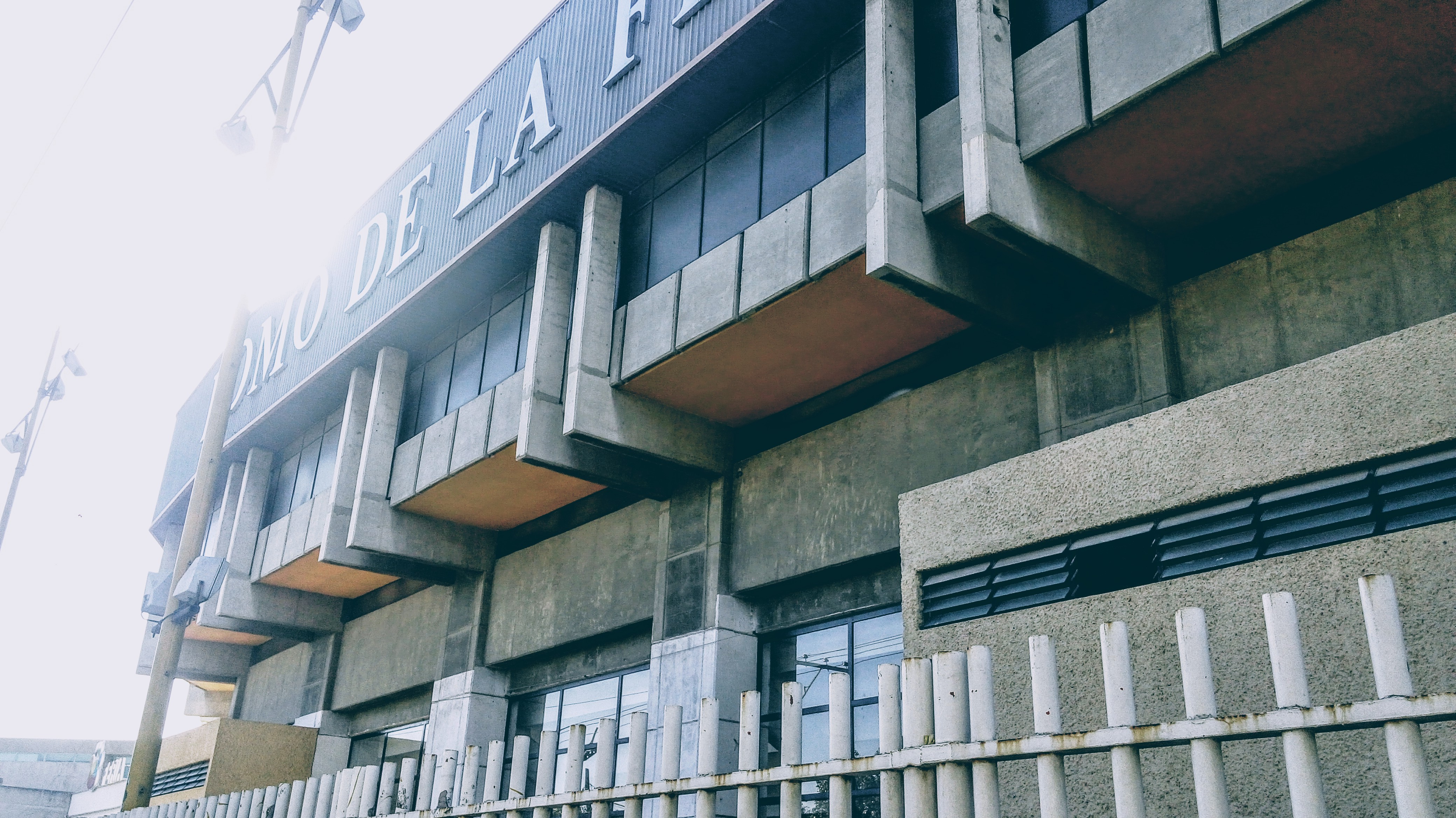
- Interactive map of Domo de la Feria
- Former names: Auditorio Municipal de León (1980-2003)
- Location: Boulevard Adolfo López Mateos Oriente 1820; León, Guanajuato
- Coordinates: 21°6′56″N 101°39′22″W
- Owner: Ayuntamiento de León
- Operator: Feria Estatal de León
- Capacity: 4,463 (basketball); 7,000 (concerts)
- Surface: Multi-surface

Construction
- Opened: June 30th, 1980

Tenants
- Abejas de León (LNBP) (2016–present); Lechugueros de León (CIMEBA) (1980–2014); Titánicos de León (LNBP) (2014–2015)

Domo de la Feria (originally Auditorio Municipal de Leon) is a 4,463-seat indoor arena located in Leon, Guanajuato. Built in the mid-1980s, it is used primarily for basketball, and is home to the Abejas de León basketball team. It is part of the municipal fairgrounds, and is one of the primary venues of the annual Feria Leon. It can seat up to 7,000 for concerts. It is also used for circuses, lucha libre, motorsports, boxing, graduations, ice shows and other events. A 4,500-seat Palenque, dedicated in 2010, is adjacent to the arena.

Among the many acts who have performed at Domo de la Feria have been: Paty Cantú, Rocio Durcal, Lupita D'Alessio, Vicente Fernandez, Joan Sebastian, Juan Gabriel, Maribel Guardia, Lucero, Gloria Trevi, Thalía, Paulina Rubio, Los Tigres del Norte, Lorena Herrera, Mana, Jenni Rivera, Banda del Recodo, Danna Paola, Aracely Arambula, Pepe Aguilar, WWE Live and many others.

Volleyball matches have also been presented, its main event in this sport was the 2017 World Volleyball League organized by the FIVB, where the semi-finals and final of Group 3.7 were played. This venue has also been the venue for sports such as Futsal, Female American Football, Boxing, Handball, Judo, Karate, Olympic Wrestling, Mixed Martial Arts, Taekwondo and Professional Wrestling with WWE, Lucha Libre AAA Worldwide, Consejo Mundial de Lucha Libre, and The Crash Lucha Libre.

The Dome of the Fair has a total of 4,463 seats inside this, which are divided into three zones, the upper area has 1,099 seats, the intermediate area has 1,831 seats and the lower area has 1,533 seats. The surface of the stage is 36m x 22m and its maximum height is 16m. Lighting has 28 lamps of 1000 watts each.

It hosted all matches for the 2023 FIBA Women's AmeriCup.

It also hosted matches for the 2024 FIBA Under-17 Women's Basketball World Cup including the final phase.
