= Mineros de Zacatecas (basketball) =

- League: LNBP
- Founded: 2017; 9 years ago
- History: Barreteros de Zacatecas (2001–2016); Mineros de Zacatecas (2017–present)
- Arena: Gimnasio Marcelino González
- Capacity: 3,458
- Location: Zacatecas, Zacatecas
- Team colors: Red, white, gray
- President: Rubén Ramos Escobedo
- Head coach: Facundo Müller
- Ownership: Grupo ISLO
Home	Away

Mineros de Zacatecas (English: Zacatecas Miners) is a Mexican professional basketball team based in the city of Zacatecas, Zacatecas. The Mineros are part of the Liga Nacional de Baloncesto Profesional, the top professional basketball league in Mexico. The team plays its home games at the Gimnasio Marcelino González, with a capacity of 3,458 spectators.

== History ==
The franchise was originally founded in 2001 as the Barreteros de Zacatecas and started playing in Liga Nacional de Baloncesto Profesional in 2004. In 2017, the team was purchased by the Government of the State of Zacatecas for 2.5 million pesos (around US$130,000) and rebranded as Mineros for the 2018–17 season.

The team's name, colors and logo are very similar to the football club Mineros de Zacatecas of the Liga de Expansión MX, the second level division of Mexican football.

In September 2026. Gimnasio Marcelino González hosted the Copa Value. A mid-season event of the LNBP that brings together the eight top-ranked teams in the league halfway through the regular season.Mineros obtained the championship at their home court after defeating Astros de Jalisco in the final 87-71.

== Players ==
=== Current roster ===
Note: Flags indicate national team eligibility at FIBA-sanctioned events. Players may hold other non-FIBA nationalities not displayed.

Mineros de Zacatecas roster
Players
Coaches

Pos.	No.	Nat.	Name	Ht.	Wt.
PF	0	(The Bahamas)	Miller, Tavario	2.03 m (6 ft 8 in)	100 kg (220 lb)
PG	1	(United States)	Smith, Daishon	1.85 m (6 ft 1 in)	80 kg (176 lb)
SG	3	(United States)	Ferguson, Romeao	1.96 m (6 ft 5 in)	95 kg (209 lb)
PG	4	(Argentina)	Valinotti, Joaquín	1.85 m (6 ft 1 in)	83 kg (183 lb)
PG	5	(Mexico)	Reyes, Miguel
SF	6	(Venezuela)	Cisneros, Anyelo	1.99 m (6 ft 6 in)	100 kg (220 lb)
C	7	(Brazil)	Doria, Lucas	2.03 m (6 ft 8 in)	103 kg (227 lb)
SG	18	(Mexico)	Rivera, Bryan	1.88 m (6 ft 2 in)	82 kg (181 lb)
PF	23	(Mexico)	Vázquez, Gabriel	2.01 m (6 ft 7 in)	100 kg (220 lb)
SG	32	(United States)	Saunders, Wesley	1.98 m (6 ft 6 in)	99 kg (218 lb)
PF	33	(Brazil)	Goncalves, Kayo	2.03 m (6 ft 8 in)	103 kg (227 lb)
SF	99	(Mexico)	Ramos, Marco	1.98 m (6 ft 6 in)	96 kg (212 lb)

Head coach

- (Argentina) Facundo Müller

Assistant coach(es)

- (Uruguay) Mathias Nieto

Legend

- (C) Team captain
- Injured

- Roster
Updated: October 14, 2020

== Notable players ==
- (United States) Adonis Thomas
