= Abejas de León =

- League: LNBP
- Founded: 2009; 17 years ago
- History: Abejas de Guanajuato; 2009–2016; Abejas de León; 2016–
- Arena: Domo de la Feria
- Capacity: 4,463
- Location: León, Guanajuato
- Team colors: Green and white
- President: Alejandro Marcocchio Romero
- Head coach: Jean Serrano
- Ownership: Proabejas A.C.
- Championships: 1 (2022)
- Website: http://abejasdeleon.com
Home	Away	Third

The Abejas de León (English: León Bees) is a Mexican professional basketball team based in León, Guanajuato. It has been a member of the LNBP since the 2009–10 season.

== History ==
=== Foundation ===
The team was previously based in Piedras Negras, Coahuila and was known as the Bravos de Piedras Negras, but the Universidad de Guanajuato bought the team and relocated it to its home town in the city of Guanajuato with the help of the City Hall and several businessmen.

=== First seasons ===
During their first season, they struggled but managed to make it to the postseason in the second-worst seed. They lost against the Halcones UV Xalapa, team who were the eventual champions. In their second season, they entered the postseason for the second year in a row, again losing in the first round, this time being defeated by the Pioneros de Quintana Roo. The following season they occupied the ninth seed, again classifying to the playoffs, but lost in the first round to the worst-qualified team, the Barreteros de Zacatecas.

=== Becoming better ===
At their fourth season, the team made it to the postseason in the 9th seed. This time, they finally made it past the first-round to the quarter-finals. In the first round, the team defeated the Huracanes de Tampico 3 games to 1. They lost in the quarter-finals against the Halcones. This is the best playoff appearance in team history. During the 13–14 season, they placed fourth in regular season marking the best regular season by the team but lost in the quarterfinals against Fuerza Regia de Monterrey.

== Roster ==
=== Current roster ===
Note: Flags indicate national team eligibility at FIBA-sanctioned events. Players may hold other non-FIBA nationalities not displayed.

Abejas de León roster
Players
Coaches

Pos.	No.	Nat.	Name	Ht.	Wt.
SF	0	(United States)	Gaines, Davonte	2.00 m (6 ft 7 in)
SF	2	(United States)	Nuño, Tomas	1.96 m (6 ft 5 in)
PF	5	(Mexico)	Olea, Raúl	1.98 m (6 ft 6 in)
SF	7	(United States)	Payton, Chris	2.00 m (6 ft 7 in)
PG	9	(Puerto Rico)	Santiago, Giovanni	1.83 m (6 ft 0 in)
SG	11	(United States)	Banks, A. J.	1.87 m (6 ft 2 in)
PF	14	(Mexico)	Coria, Jesús	2.04 m (6 ft 8 in)
C	21	(Mexico)	Castro, Alberto	2.03 m (6 ft 8 in)
SG	22	(Mexico)	Leal, Pedro	1.82 m (6 ft 0 in)
PF	23	(Mexico)	Miramontes, Omar	1.99 m (6 ft 6 in)
PG	26	(Puerto Rico)	Morales, Robiel	1.89 m (6 ft 2 in)
PF	35	(United States)	Winston, Justin	2.02 m (6 ft 8 in)
SG	67	(Mexico)	Pinedo, Hanzel

Head coach

- (Puerto Rico) Jean Serrano

Assistant coach(es)

- (Mexico) Ulises Roldán

Legend

- (C) Team captain
- (I) Import player
- Injured

- Roster
Updated: October 14, 2020
