= Huracanes de Tampico =

- League: LNBP
- Founded: 2009
- Dissolved: 2020
- History: Huracanes de Tampico (2009–2020)
- Arena: Centro de Convenciones de Tampico
- Capacity: 8,500
- Location: Tampico, Mexico
- Team colors: Navy blue, sky blue, white
- Head coach: Omar Quintero
Home	Away

Huracanes de Tampico (English: Tampico Hurricanes) is a professional Mexican basketball team, based in Tampico, Tamaulipas. The Libertadores are part of the Liga Nacional de Baloncesto Profesional, the top professional basketball league in Mexico. The team plays their home games at the Expo Tampico, with a capacity of 4,200 spectators.

== History ==
Professional basketball in Tampico started in the 1990s, with the Correcaminos UAT Tampico; the team achieved 4 championships and were runners-up twice in the Conferencia de Básquetbol Profesional.

The Huracanes was established in 2009 as a joint effort of public institutions and private entities to bring professional basketball back to the city of Tampico. Huracanes is also the first LNBP team to have played a friendly match against a European team, FC Barcelona Bàsquet.

After the 2014–15 season, the team went on hiatus, making their comeback for the 2018–19 season.

For the 2018–19 season, Argentine Marcelo Elusich was appointed as head coach.

== Players ==
=== Current roster ===
Note: Flags indicate national team eligibility at FIBA-sanctioned events. Players may hold other non-FIBA nationalities not displayed.

Huracanes de Tampico roster
Players
Coaches

Pos.	No.	Nat.	Name	Ht.	Wt.
F	3	(United States)	Harper, Aaron	2.03 m (6 ft 8 in)	94 kg (207 lb)
SG	7	(Mexico)	Ramírez, Maximiliano	1.85 m (6 ft 1 in)	74 kg (163 lb)
G/F	10	(Mexico)	Herrera, Pedro	1.94 m (6 ft 4 in)	90 kg (198 lb)
G	13	(United States)	Lamonte, Kyle	1.91 m (6 ft 3 in)
C	14	(Mexico)	Carrillo, Hugo	2.03 m (6 ft 8 in)	110 kg (243 lb)
C	15	(United States)	Woodson, Dominic	2.10 m (6 ft 11 in)	127 kg (280 lb)
G	50	(Mexico)	Sosa, Miguel	1.88 m (6 ft 2 in)	80 kg (176 lb)

Head coach

- (Mexico) Omar Quintero

Assistant coach(es)

- (United States) Steven Charles Walton

Legend

- (C) Team captain
- Injured

- Roster
Updated: October 14, 2020

=== Notable players ===
Note: Flags indicate national team eligibility at FIBA-sanctioned events. Players may hold other non-FIBA nationalities not displayed.

Criteria

To appear in this section a player must have either:

- Set a club record or won an individual award while at the club
- Played at least one official international match for their national team at any time
- Played at least one official NBA match at any time.

- (The Bahamas) Michael Carey
- (Mexico) Omar Quintero
- (Mexico) Adrián Zamora
- (Puerto Rico) Timajh Parker-Rivera
- (United States) Eddie Basden
- (United States) Tony Bobbitt
- (United States) Ivan Johnson
- (Venezuela) Néstor Colmenares
