= Toros de Nuevo Laredo =

- Leagues: Mexican League
- Founded: 2007
- Dissolved: 2018
- History: Correcaminos UAT Matamaros (2000–2007); Venados de Nuevo Laredo (2007–2009); Toros de Nuevo Laredo (2009–2012); Toros de Los Dos Laredo (2012–2013); Toros de Nuevo Laredo (2013–2018)
- Arena: Polyforum Dr. Rodolfo Torre Cantú
- Capacity: 5,224
- Location: Nuevo Laredo, Tamaulipas
- Team colors: Red, black and white
- President: José Hernández Villegas
- Head coach: José Ramón Martínez Boglio
- Championships: 2 (2010-11, 2012-13)
- Conference titles: 0
- Division titles: 0
- Retired numbers: 0
- Website: http://lnbp.mx/Toros/
Home	Away

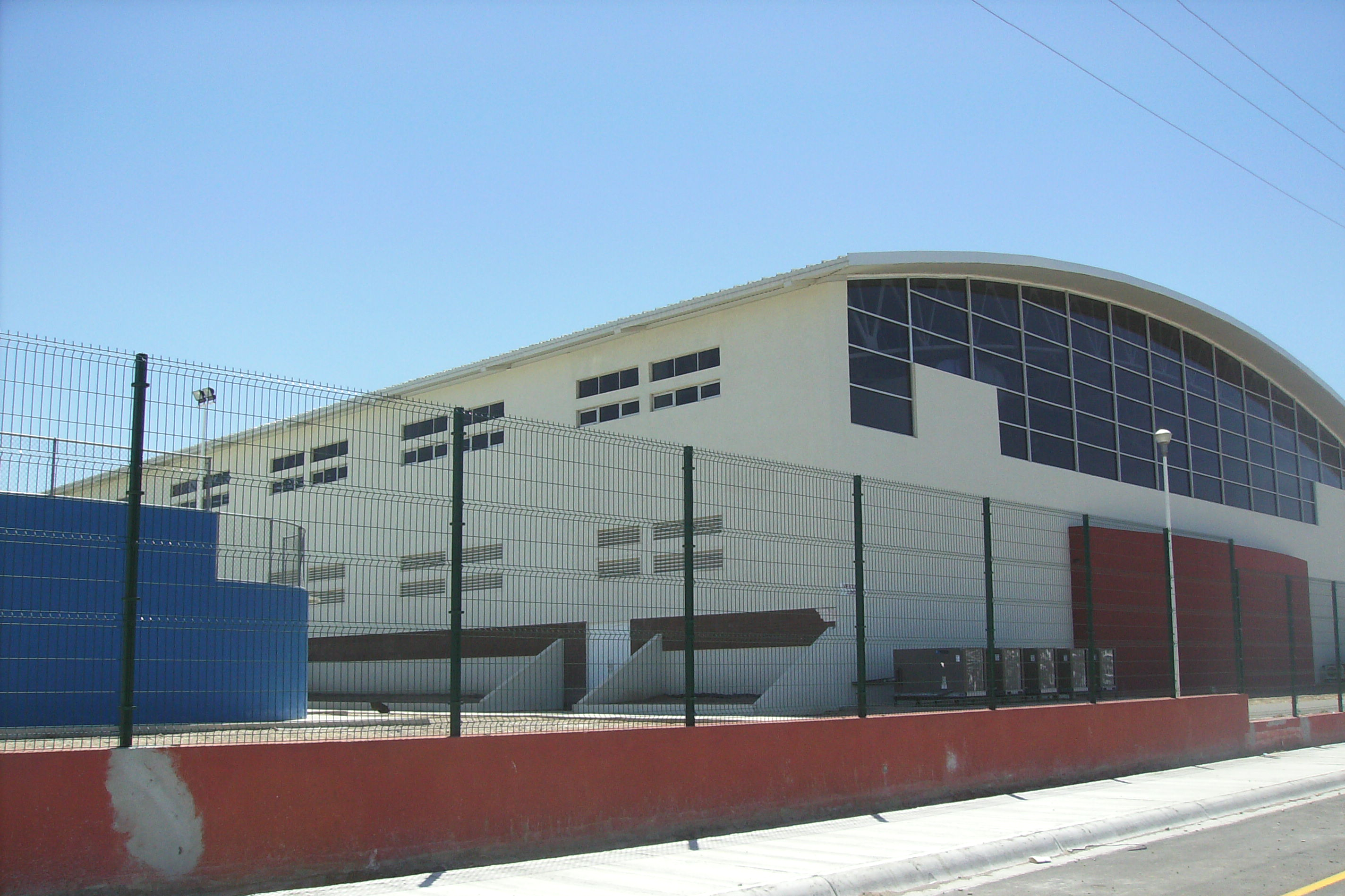
Gimnasio Multidisciplinario Nuevo Laredo is home to the Toros de Nuevo Laredo

The Toros de Nuevo Laredo (Bulls of Nuevo Laredo in English) are a professional basketball team based in Nuevo Laredo, Tamaulipas, Mexico playing in the Northern Division of the Mexican Liga Nacional de Baloncesto Profesional (LNBP).

== History ==
The Correcaminos UAT Matamoros (Matamoros Roadrunners) were transferred to Nuevo Laredo in 2007 and were renamed Venados de Nuevo Laredo. In the 2009-10 season the team was renamed Toros de Nuevo Laredo. During the 2010–2011 season the Toros de Nuevo Laredo won their first League Championship beating the Pioneros de Quintana Roo. During the 2012 - 2013 season the team was renamed the Toros de Los Dos Laredos after an agreement with the city of Laredo, Texas to play home games in the Laredo Energy Arena. The Toros de Los Dos Laredos played their home games in the newly designed sports complex, the Ciudad Deportiva's Gimnasio Multidisciplinario Nuevo Laredo in Mexico and the Laredo Energy Arena in the United States. The Toros de Los Dos Laredos won its second championship in 2013 beating Halcones UV Xalapa. It was announced that for the 2013-2014 the team would be renamed back to Toros de Nuevo Laredo. The reason given was that the team is funded by the state and its budget was cut in half because it played half its games out of state.

== Sponsorship ==
Oradel Industrial Center: Since 2017 the industrial park is a sponsor of Toros de Nuevo Laredo.

== Roster ==
Venados de Nuevo Laredo 2012-13 season.

#	Name	Height	Position
06		192 (5'11")	G/F
22	Lynch Chris	198 (6'6")	G/F
19	Beard Kevin	204 (6'9")	C/F
24	Malpica Yahir	190 (6'3")	G
13	Futch Matt	203 (6'8")	C/F
9	Bermudez Jaime	193 (6'4")	F
6	Montalvo Domingo	204 (6'9")	C
3	Lugo Jesus	N/A	N/A
10	Robles Eder	N/A	N/A
4	Gutierrez J.	182 (6'0")	G
18	Alvarado Jesus	N/A	N/A
12	Gonzalez Jose	N/A	N/A

== Championships ==
=== 2010 / 2011 Championship series ===
Date	Time	Local Team	Result	Visiting Team
February 20, 2011	20:30	Pioneros de Quintana Roo	83 - 79	Toros de Nuevo Laredo
February 21, 2011	20:30	Pioneros de Quintana Roo	66 - 81	Toros de Nuevo Laredo
February 24, 2011	20:30	Toros de Nuevo Laredo	83 - 72	Pioneros de Quintana Roo
February 25, 2011	20:30	Toros de Nuevo Laredo	97 - 86	Pioneros de Quintana Roo
February 26, 2011	20:30	Toros de Nuevo Laredo	95 - 98	Pioneros de Quintana Roo
March 1, 2011	20:30	Pioneros de Quintana Roo	82 - 93	Toros de Nuevo Laredo
Toros won the championship series 4:2

=== 2011 / 2012 Championship series ===
Date	Time	Local Team	Result	Visiting Team
February 7, 2012	20:30	Halcones Rojos	87 - 62	Toros de Nuevo Laredo
February 8, 2012	20:30	Halcones Rojos	93 - 96	Toros de Nuevo Laredo
February 11, 2012	20:30	Toros de Nuevo Laredo	65 - 67	Halcones Rojos
February 12, 2012	20:30	Toros de Nuevo Laredo	61 - 68	Halcones Rojos
February 13, 2012	20:30	Toros de Nuevo Laredo	69 - 92	Halcones Rojos
Halcones Rojos won the championship series 4:1

=== 2012 / 2013 Championship series ===
Date	Time	Local Team	Result	Visiting Team
February 18, 2013	20:30	Halcones UV Xalapa	102 - 80	Toros de Los Dos Laredos
February 19, 2013	20:30	Halcones UV Xalapa	60 - 64	Toros de Los Dos Laredos
February 22, 2013	20:30	Toros de Los Dos Laredos	79 - 89	Halcones UV Xalapa
February 23, 2013	20:30	Toros de Los Dos Laredos	77 - 75	Halcones UV Xalapa
February 24, 2013	20:30	Toros de Los Dos Laredos	94 - 89	Halcones UV Xalapa
February 27, 2013	20:30	Halcones UV Xalapa	83 - 96	Toros de Los Dos Laredos
Toros won the championship series 4:2

Venados old logo (2007–2009)

== See also ==
- Liga Nacional de Baloncesto Profesional
