= Barreteros de Zacatecas =

- Leagues: LNBP
- Founded: 2004
- Dissolved: 2016
- Arena: Gimnasio Marcelino González
- Capacity: 3,458
- Location: Zacatecas, Mexico
- Team colors: Orange, Black, White
- President: Jesus Alba Rodriguez
- Head coach: Andres Contreras
- Championships: 2 LINAC National Championship; 2001, 2003
- Website: barreterosdezacatecas.com.mx
Home	Away	Third

The Barreteros de Zacatecas was a Mexican professional basketball team based in Zacatecas, Zacatecas, Mexico playing in the Southern Division of the Liga Nacional de Baloncesto Profesional (LNBP).

== History ==
Barreteros was founded in the semi-pro league Liga Nacional de Clubes achieving two championships in 2001 and 2003, in 2004 they started playing in LNBP taking the place of Chihuahua Dorados.

The first season of Barreteros in pro basketball was also their best, as they eliminated Algodoneros de la Comarca in the first round of playoffs. However, Fuerza Regia swept Zacatecas in four games in the semifinals. In 2005 Zacatecas was eliminated by the heavily favoured and eventual champions Halcones UV Xalapa in three games on the first round of playoffs.

2006 marked their first elimination in regular season, with a record of 10-26.

In 2007 the team merged with state rivals Gambusinos de Fresnillo to turn into Union Zacatecas and played half of their home games in Fresnillo. The slump continued and the team finished with a 20-28 record. In 2009 Barreteros made the playoffs but was eliminated by regional rivals Panteras Aguascalientes.

In 2010, it was announced that the team would not take part in that year's season, causing great discontent among fans and leaving the state without a professional sports franchise for the first time in more than a decade.

In 2011, they made a comeback, but the franchise was shut down again prior to the 2013-14 season, reappearing in 2014 for only a year, and again in 2016.

In 2017, the Zacatecas State Government acquired the team and renamed it Mineros.

== Coaches ==
2004-06

- Jeff Moore

2007-10

- Alejandro Rivera

2011-...

- Andres Contreras

== 2011 roster ==
- (United States) Chaz Twan Briggs
- (United States) Ramiro Almanza Loera
- (Mexico) Salvador Cuevas
- (Mexico) Pablo González
- (United States) Forrest Ray Fisher III
- (United States) James Lamont Reaves
- (Mexico) Alejandro Aguirre
- (Mexico) Ángel Javier Chacón
- (Mexico) Fernando Sandoval
- (United States) Melvin Council
- (Mexico) Raúl Navarro López

== See also ==
- Tuzos UAZ Cemozac
