= Pioneros de Quintana Roo =

- Leagues: LNBP
- Founded: 2006
- Dissolved: 2016
- Arena: Polifórum Benito Juárez
- Location: Cancún, Mexico
- President: Wilberth E. Flores Coral
- Head coach: Alberto Espasandín D Santo
- Championships: 1 (2016)
- Website: pionerosbasket.com.mx
Home	Away

The Pioneros de Quintana Roo (Quintana Roo Pioneers in English) were a Mexican professional basketball team based in Cancún, Mexico, playing in the Liga Nacional de Baloncesto Profesional (LNBP). During the 2010–2011 season the team made it to the finals. They became runners-up after losing to the Toros de Nuevo Laredo.

The Pioneros requested a temporary leave from the league in August 2016. The team was reported to have re-joined the LNBP in 2019, but this was later disallowed by the league due to unsatisfactory facilities.

== Honours ==
- FIBA Americas League
  - Winner: 2012
  - Runner-up: 2015

== Notable players ==
Note: Flags indicate national team eligibility at FIBA-sanctioned events. Players may hold other non-FIBA nationalities not displayed.

Criteria

To appear in this section a player must have either:

- Set a club record or won an individual award while at the club
- Played at least one official international match for their national team at any time
- Played at least one official NBA match at any time.

- (Jamaica) Akeem Scott
- (Mexico) Noé Alonzo
- (Mexico) Romel Beck
- (Mexico) Francisco Cruz
- (Mexico) Edgar Garibay
- (Mexico) Jorge Gutiérrez
- (Mexico) Héctor Hernández
- (Mexico) Horacio Llamas
- (Mexico) Lorenzo Mata
- (Mexico) Orlando Méndez-Valdez
- (Mexico) David Meza
- (Mexico) Adam Parada
- (Mexico) Enrique Zúñiga
- (Senegal) Boubacar Aw
- (United States) Jabari Smith
