= Lechugueros de León =

Mexican basketball team

- League: LNBP Southern Division
- Founded: 1971
- Dissolved: 2014
- Arena: Domo de la Feria
- Location: León, Guanajuato
- Head coach: Javier Mendoza
- Ownership: Gustavo Saggiante
- Championships: CIMEBA: 2 (1971, 1973) LNBP: 0
Home	Away

The Lechugueros de León was a Mexican professional basketball team based in León, Guanajuato, Mexico playing in the Southern Division of the Liga Nacional de Baloncesto Profesional (LNBP). Lechugueros played in the classic Circuito Mexicano de Básquetbol in the early 1970s, and joined the LNBP in 2004. Their home arena is the Domo de la Feria.

== Notable players ==
- Set a club record or won an individual award as a professional player.
- Played at least one official international match for his senior national team at any time.

- (Mexico) Horacio Llamas
- (Panama) Ernesto Oglivie
