= Halcones de Xalapa =

- Conference: East
- League: LNBP
- Founded: 2003; 23 years ago
- Dissolved: 2026
- History: Halcones UV Xalapa (2003–2013); Halcones de Xalapa (2013–2015, 2021–2026)
- Arena: Gimnasio Universitario Nido del Halcón
- Capacity: 2,000
- Location: Xalapa, Veracruz, Mexico
- Team colors: Purple, white, gold, black
- President: Ángel Fernando Morales Blanchet
- Head coach: Paco Olmos
- Ownership: Promoción Deportiva y Cultural AC
- Championships: 4 (2005, 2008, 2009, 2010)
- Website: halconesdexalapa.com.mx
Home	Away	Third

Halcones de Xalapa (in English: Xalapa Falcons) is a basketball club based in Xalapa, Veracruz, Mexico that plays in the Liga Nacional de Baloncesto Profesional (LNBP). Their home games are played at Gimnasio Universitario de la Unidad Deportiva. Halcones have won four LNBP championships, in 2005, 2008, 2009 and 2010.

Former Michigan star and NBA player, Robert Traylor, played for Halcones UV Xalapa three months before his death in May 2011. In 2015, Halcones withdrew from the LNBP due to financial problems.

In the 2023–24 season, Halcones played in the continental top league Basketball Champions League Americas (BCLA). They became the first Mexican team in the competition's history to make the Final Four.

== Roster ==
Note: Flags indicate national team eligibility at FIBA-sanctioned events. Players may hold other non-FIBA nationalities not displayed.

Halcones de Xalapa roster
Players
Coaches

Pos.	No.	Nat.	Name	Ht.
PG	2	(Mexico)	Ramírez, Víctor	1.80 m (5 ft 11 in)
C	50	(United States)	Lynch, Reggie	2.08 m (6 ft 10 in)

Head coach

- (Spain) Paco Olmos

Assistant coach(es)

- (Mexico) Paulina Graillet

Legend

- (C) Team captain
- Injured

- Roster
Updated: 10 March 2026

=== Notable players ===
- (Mexico) Christopher Hernandez
- (Mexico) Héctor Hernandez
- (Mexico) Víctor Mariscal
- (Mexico) Lorenzo Mata
- (Mexico) Orlando Méndez
- (Mexico) Adam Parada
- (Ivory Coast) Herve Lamizana
- (United States) Samuel Bowie
- (United States) Gerald Brown Jr.
- (United States) Robert Traylor
- (United States) Davin White
- (United States) Lou Roe
- (United States) Brandon Brown
