= 2018–19 LNBP season =

LNBP
- Season: 2018–19
- Teams: 14

Regular season
- Season MVP: Rigoberto Mendoza (Capitanes)

Finals
- Champions: Fuerza Regia; 2nd title
- Runners-up: Capitanes

Statistical leaders
Points	John Taylor	20.6
Rebounds	Mamadou N'Diaye	10.9
Assists	Heissler Guillent	6.6
- All statistics correct as of 14 April 2019.

The 2018–19 LNBP season was the 19th season of the Liga Nacional de Baloncesto Profesional, Mexico's top professional basketball league. It started in October 2018 with the first round of the regular season and ended in April 2019 with the last game of the finals, won by Fuerza Regia de Monterrey.

== Teams ==
A total of 14 teams contest the league, including four new franchises.

=== Venues and locations ===
Locations of the teams in 2018–19 LNBP season
North Division
South Division

Team	Home city	Arena	Capacity
Abejas de León	León	Domo de la Feria	4,463
Aguacateros de Michoacán	Morelia	Auditorio de Usos Múltiples de la UMSNH	3,500
Ángeles de Puebla	Puebla	Gimnasio Miguel Hidalgo	4,000
Capitanes de la Ciudad de México	Mexico City	Gimnasio Olímpico Juan de la Barrera	5,242
Correcaminos UAT Victoria	Ciudad Victoria	Gimnasio Multidisciplinario UAT Victoria	3,500
Fuerza Regia de Monterrey	Monterrey	Gimnasio Nuevo León Independiente	5,000
Huracanes de Tampico	Tampico	Expo Tampico	4,200
Laguneros de La Comarca	Torreón	Auditorio Municipal de Torreón	4,363
Leñadores de Durango	Durango City	Auditorio del Pueblo	3,500
Libertadores de Querétaro	Querétaro City	Auditorio Arteaga	4,138
Mineros de Zacatecas	Zacatecas City	Gimnasio Profesor Marcelino González	3,600
Panteras de Aguascalientes	Aguascalientes City	Auditorio Hermanos Carreón	3,000
Santos de San Luis	San Luis Potosí City	Auditorio Miguel Barragán	4,000
Soles de Mexicali	Mexicali	Auditorio del Estado	4,400

=== Personnel and sponsorship ===
Team	Head coach	Captain	Kit manufacturer	Main front sponsor
Abejas de León	(Puerto Rico) Pepo Martínez	(United States) Gary Mondragón	Pirma	–
Aguacateros de Michoacán	(Mexico) Omar Quintero	(Mexico) Arim Solares	Li-Ning	Michoacán Tourism Board
Ángeles de Puebla	(Spain) Pedro Carrillo	(Puerto Rico) Filiberto Rivera		–
Capitanes de la Ciudad de México	(Spain) Ramón Díaz Sánchez	(Mexico) Héctor Hernández	Spalding	Accendo Banco
Correcaminos UAT Victoria	(Mexico) Luis García	(Mexico) José Farrera	Ardex	–
Fuerza Regia de Monterrey	(Spain) Paco Olmos	(Puerto Rico) Carlos Rivera	Li-Ning	Grupo Autofin
Huracanes de Tampico	(Argentina) Marcelo Elusich	(United States) Timajh Parker-Rivera		–
Laguneros de La Comarca	(Mexico) Andrés Contreras	(Jamaica) Akeem Scott		City of Torreón
Leñadores de Durango	(Argentina) Juan José Pidal	(Mexico) Stephen Soriano		State of Durango
Libertadores de Querétaro	(Argentina) Leandro Ramella	(Mexico) Cezar Guerrero	Li-Ning	Brose
Mineros de Zacatecas	(Puerto Rico) Manolo Cintrón	(Mexico) Joaquín Villanueva	Udi Sport	State of Zacatecas
Panteras de Aguascalientes	(United States) Eric Weissling	(Mexico) Fabián Jaimes	Udi Sport	State of Aguascalientes
Santos de San Luis	(Mexico) Gustavo Quintero	(United States) Jaron Martin	Udi Sport	Canel's
Soles de Mexicali	(Spain) Iván Déniz	(United States) Lance Goulborne		–

== Regular season ==
=== League table ===
North

Pos	Team	Pld	W	L	PF	PA	PD	Pts	Qualification
1	Fuerza Regia	40	31	9	3409	3090	+319	71	LNBP Playoffs
2	Mineros	40	30	10	3646	3355	+291	70	LNBP Playoffs
3	Leñadores	40	25	15	3562	3401	+161	65	LNBP Playoffs
4	Laguneros	40	19	21	3363	3461	−98	59	LNBP Playoffs
5	Correcaminos	40	18	22	3750	3838	−88	58	
6	Santos	40	13	27	3588	3694	−106	53	
7	Huracanes	40	6	34	3240	3759	−519	46	

Source: lnbp.mx

South

Pos	Team	Pld	W	L	PF	PA	PD	Pts	Qualification
1	Capitanes	40	27	13	3681	3311	+370	67	LNBP Playoffs
2	Soles	40	27	13	3679	3461	+218	67	LNBP Playoffs
3	Aguacateros	40	23	17	3426	3456	−30	63	LNBP Playoffs
4	Abejas	40	18	22	3342	3293	+49	58	LNBP Playoffs
5	Panteras	40	17	23	3581	3658	−77	57	
6	Libertadores	40	13	27	3550	3750	−200	53	
7	Ángeles	40	13	27	3080	3370	−290	53	

Source: lnbp.mx

== Playoffs ==
Conference Semifinals
1	Fuerza Regia	4
4	Laguneros	0
North
2	Mineros	1
3	Leñadores	4
1	Capitanes	4
4	Abejas	0
South
2	Soles	4
3	Aguacateros	3

Conference Finals
1	Fuerza Regia	4
3	Leñadores	2
1	Capitanes	4
2	Soles	2

Final
N1	Fuerza Regia	4
S1	Capitanes	2
