= Omar De Haro =

Mexican basketball player (born 1995)

No. 24 – Gambusinos de Fresnillo
- Position: Small forward
- League: Liga Nacional de Baloncesto Profesional

Personal information
- Born: 13 May 1995 (age 31) Guadalajara, Jalisco, Mexico
- Listed height: 6 ft 2 in (1.88 m)
- Listed weight: 187 lb (85 kg)

Career information
- College: ITESM
- Playing career: 2019–present

Career history
- 2019: Gigantes de Jalisco
- 2019: Aguacateros de Michoacán
- 2019: Fuerza Regia de Monterrey
- 2020: Aguacateros de Michoacán
- 2021: Leñadores de Durango
- 2022: Astros de Jalisco
- 2022: Dorados de Chihuahua
- 2023: Santos del Potosí
- 2023: Halcones de Xalapa
- 2024: Tijuana Zonkeys
- 2024: Lobos Plateados de la BUAP
- 2025: Indomables de Ciudad Juárez
- 2025: Toros Laguna
- 202: Zonkeys de Tijuana
- 2026–present: Gambusinos de Fresnillo

Omar De Haro Gutiérrez (born 13 May 1995) is a Mexican professional basketball player for the Toros Laguna of the LBE, and the Mexican national team.

== Career ==
Montano made his debut in the 2019 season with the Gigantes de Jalisco in the CIBACOPA league, later the same year he signed with Aguacateros de Michoacán to play in the LNBP. In the season 2019 he played with Fuerza Regia de Monterrey. In 2021 he played with Leñadores de Durango. In 2023 he signed with Santos del Potosí. In 2025 he signed with Toros Laguna.

== National team career ==
Since 2022, he is member of the Mexican national team. He was part of the squad that participated in the 2022 FIBA AmeriCup.
