= Pedro Carrillo =

Spanish basketball coach (born 1973)

Personal information
- Born: 17 August 1973 (age 53) Zaragoza, Spain
- Position: Head coach
- Coaching career: 2010–present

Career history

Coaching
- 2010–2014: Basket Zaragoza (assistant)
- 2015: Club Baloncesto El Olivar (assistant)
- 2015: Jefes Fuerza Lagunera (assistant)
- 2016: Fuerza Regia de Monterrey (assistant)
- 2017: Aguacateros de Michoacán (assistant)
- 2018: Ángeles de Puebla
- 2019–2020: Mexico City Capitanes (assistant)
- 2022: Mineros de Zacatecas
- 2023: Soles de Mexicali
- 2024: Mineros de Zacatecas
- 2025: Pioneros de Delicias

Pedro Carrillo Ballester (born 17 August 1973) is a Spanish basketball coach. He is the head coach of the Pioneros de Delicias.

== Coaching career ==
Carrillo joined CAI in the 2006–07 season to work at the club's Foundation school. He later teamed up with Carlos Pardo to coach the cadet team and subsequently with Carlos Iglesias. In the 2010–2011 season, he joined the first team as the third coach of the Liga Endesa squad, while continuing his developmental work within the club's youth system. Pedro was part of José Luis Abós’s coaching staff, serving as the scouting coordinator and assistant coach for four seasons in the ACB League. In the 2013–2014 campaign, he also joined the Spanish U15 national team as an assistant coach. In 2015, he agreed to coach Club Baloncesto El Olivar in the LEB Plata league. However, after leaving the Zaragoza-based affiliate team, and following nine seasons within the club's structure, Pedro moved to Mexico to become the assistant coach to Paco Olmos with Jefes Fuerza Lagunera in the LNBP. In the 2016–17 season, he joined Paco Olmos once again to coach Fuerza Regia de Monterrey, where they won the LNBP championship. In 2017, Carrillo was part of the technical staff of Aguacateros de Michoacán. In September 2018, he signed on as head coach of Ángeles de Puebla, marking his first experience as a head coach. In 2019, he joined Ramón Díaz Sánchez’s coaching staff with Mexico City Capitanes.
