= Raúl Olalde =

Mexican basketball player (born 1996)

Personal information
- Born: 21 February 1996 (age 30) Mexico City, Mexico
- Listed height: 6 ft 5 in (1.96 m)
- Listed weight: 200 lb (91 kg)

Career information
- College: ITESM
- Playing career: 2020–present
- Position: Power forward

Career history
- 2020: Aguacateros de Michoacán
- 2021–2024: Toros Laguna
- 2021: Leñadores de Durango
- 2022–2024: Fuerza Regia de Monterrey
- 2023: Ángeles de la Ciudad de México
- 2025: Piratas de Los Lagos
- 2025: Astros de Jalisco
- 2026: Ángeles de la Ciudad de México

Raúl Fernando Olalde Vázquez (born 21 February 1996) is a Mexican professional basketball player.

== Career ==
Olalde made his debut in the 2020 season with the Aguacateros de Michoacán to play in the LNBP. In the season 2021 he played with Toros Laguna in the LBE. In 2022 he signed with Fuerza Regia de Monterrey where he won the 2023 championship. In 2023 he made his debut in CIBACOPA with Ángeles de la Ciudad de México. In 2025 he played in the Liga Ecuatoriana de Baloncesto Profesional with Piratas de Los Lagos.
