= Mychal Ammons =

American basketball player (born 1992)

Personal information
- Born: January 2, 1992 (age 34) Bethesda, Maryland, U.S.
- Listed height: 6 ft 5 in (1.96 m)
- Listed weight: 225 lb (102 kg)

Career information
- High school: Vicksburg (Vicksburg, Mississippi)
- College: South Alabama (2011–2014)
- NBA draft: 2014: undrafted
- Playing career: 2014–2020
- Position: Small forward

Career history
- 2014–2015: Feni Industries
- 2015–2016: Estudiantes Concordia
- 2016: Idaho Stampede
- 2016: Tijuana Zonkeys
- 2016: TNT KaTropa
- 2016: Estudiantes Concordia
- 2017: Levickí Patrioti
- 2017: Garra Cañera de Navolato
- 2017–2018: Al Gharafa Doha
- 2018: Tijuana Zonkeys
- 2018–2019: Laguneros de La Comarca
- 2019: Tijuana Zonkeys
- 2019: NorthPort Batang Pier
- 2020: Tijuana Zonkeys

Career highlights
- LNBP champion (2019); LNBP Slam Dunk Contest champion (2019); CIBACOPA champion (2018); CIBACOPA MVP (2018); 2× CIBACOPA All-Star (2018, 2019)

Mychal Lemar Ammons (born January 2, 1992) is an American former professional basketball player. He played college basketball for South Alabama.

== High school career ==
Ammons attended Vicksburgh High School where he averaged 21.8 points, 8.9 rebounds and 2.1 blocks as a senior and led the Gators to the 6A state championship game. This earned him the MVP award of the Mississippi State tournament and was named First Team All-State by MagnoliaPreps.com.

== College career ==
After graduating, Ammons attended South Alabama where he, as a junior, was third in scoring (9.3 points) and second in rebounds (7.2) while playing an average of 27.9 minutes a game, shooting 43.9 percent from the floor, 37.1 percent from 3-point range and 64.4 percent at the free throw line. On April 16, 2014, he decided to forgo his senior season to play overseas.

== Professional career ==
After applying for early entry to the 2014 NBA draft, Ammons signed a contract with Feni Industries of Macedonia on May 12, 2014. After averaging 9.4 points, 7.2 rebounds, 1.8 assists and 1.3 blocks per game, Ammons parted ways with Feni Industries on July 1, 2015.

On November 1, 2015, Ammons was acquired by the Idaho Stampede of the NBA Development League following a successful tryout with the team. However, he was waived on November 11 before the start of the season. On November 26, he was acquired by Estudiantes Concordia of Argentina. On January 23, 2016, he returned to Idaho, making his debut that night in a 108–101 loss to the Texas Legends, recording two points and four rebounds in seven minutes.

On May 20, 2016, Ammons signed with the Tijuana Zonkeys of the Mexican Circuito de Baloncesto de la Costa del Pacífico (CIBACOPA). That day, he made his debut for the Zonkeys in a 92–87 loss to the Garra Cañera de Navolato, recording nine points, four rebounds, two assists and one steal in 15 minutes off the bench.

On August 12, 2016, Ammons signed with TNT Katropa of the PBA to replace Mario Little as their import for the 2016 PBA Governors' Cup. In his first career PBA game, Ammons recorded a double-double of 18 points and 18 rebounds as TNT won the game, 109–89, against the Blackwater Elite.

Ammons returned to the Tijuana Zonkeys for the 2018 CIBACOPA season, leading the team to a league title and earning league MVP honors.

Ammons joined the Laguneros de La Comarca of the Liga Nacional de Baloncesto Profesional (LNBP) for the 2018–19 season. He helped the team reach the playoffs and won the Slam Dunk Contest.

== Personal life ==
The son of Tony and Katie Ammons, he is the youngest of three children. His sister, Taylor Ammons, is a former member of University of South Alabama women's basketball team. He majored in interdisciplinary studies.
