= Gabriel Vázquez (basketball) =

Mexican basketball player (born 1994)

No. 23 – Mineros de Zacatecas
- Position: Power forward
- League: LNBP

Personal information
- Born: 25 April 1994 (age 32) Mexicali, Baja California, Mexico
- Listed height: 6 ft 7 in (2.01 m)
- Listed weight: 220 lb (100 kg)

Career information
- College: Autonomous University of Baja California
- NBA draft: 2016: undrafted
- Playing career: 2017–present

Career history
- 2017: Caballeros de Culiacán
- 2018: Zonkeys de Tijuana
- 2018: Brujos de Izalco
- 2018: Aguacateros de Michoacán
- 2019: Huracanes de Tampico
- 2019: Fuerza Regia de Monterrey
- 2020: Abejas de León
- 2021: Zonkeys de Tijuana
- 2021–2024: Pioneros de Los Mochis
- 2022: Cerveceros de Meoqui
- 2022: Libertadores de Querétaro
- 2023: Correbasket UAT
- 2024: Lobos Plateados de la BUAP
- 2025: Correbasket UAT
- 2026–present: Soles de Ojinaga
- 2026–present: Mineros de Zacatecas

Gabriel Vázquez Mejía (born 25 April 1994) is a Mexican professional basketball player.

== Career ==
Vázquez made his debut in the 2017 season with the Caballeros de Culiacán to play in the CIBACOPA. He played with Pioneros de Los Mochis in the seasons 2021, 2022, 2023 and 2024. In 2022 he played with Cerveceros de Meoqui in the LBE. He has also played in several teams of the LNBP such as Aguacateros de Michoacán, Huracanes de Tampico, Fuerza Regia de Monterrey, Abejas de León, Libertadores de Querétaro, Correbasket UAT and Lobos Plateados de la BUAP.

== National team career ==
In 2024, he was a member of the preliminary list of the Mexican national team that participated in the 2024 FIBA Men's Olympic Qualifying Tournaments.
