= Alejandro Reyna (basketball) =

Mexican basketball player (born 1997)

No. 17 – Halcones de Ciudad Obregón
- Position: Center
- League: CIBACOPA

Personal information
- Born: 17 February 1997 (age 29) Puerto Peñasco, Sonora, Mexico
- Listed height: 6 ft 8 in (2.03 m)
- Listed weight: 251 lb (114 kg)

Career information
- College: Sonora Institute of Technology
- NBA draft: 2019: undrafted
- Playing career: 2017–present

Career history
- 2017–2018: Halcones de Ciudad Obregón
- 2018: Aguacateros de Michoacán
- 2019: Ciclista Olímpico
- 2020: Aguacateros de Michoacán
- 2021: Dorados de Chihuahua
- 2021–2023: Soles de Mexicali
- 2024: Toros Laguna
- 2024: Halcones Rojos Veracruz
- 2025: Pioneros de Delicias
- 2025: Soles de Mexicali
- 2025: Gambusinos de Fresnillo
- 2025–present: Halcones de Ciudad Obregón

Alejandro Reyna Martínez (born 17 February 1997) is a Mexican professional basketball player for the Halcones de Ciudad Obregón of the CIBACOPA.

== Career ==
Reyna made his debut in the 2017 season with the Halcones de Ciudad Obregón to play in the CIBACOPA. He has played with Aguacateros de Michoacán, Halcones Rojos Veracruz and Soles de Mexicali in the LNBP. He played with Dorados de Chihuahua, Toros Laguna and Pioneros de Delicias in the LBE.

== National team career ==
In 2024, he was a member of the preliminary list of the Mexican national team that participated in the 2024 FIBA Men's Olympic Qualifying Tournaments.
