= Avry Holmes =

American basketball player

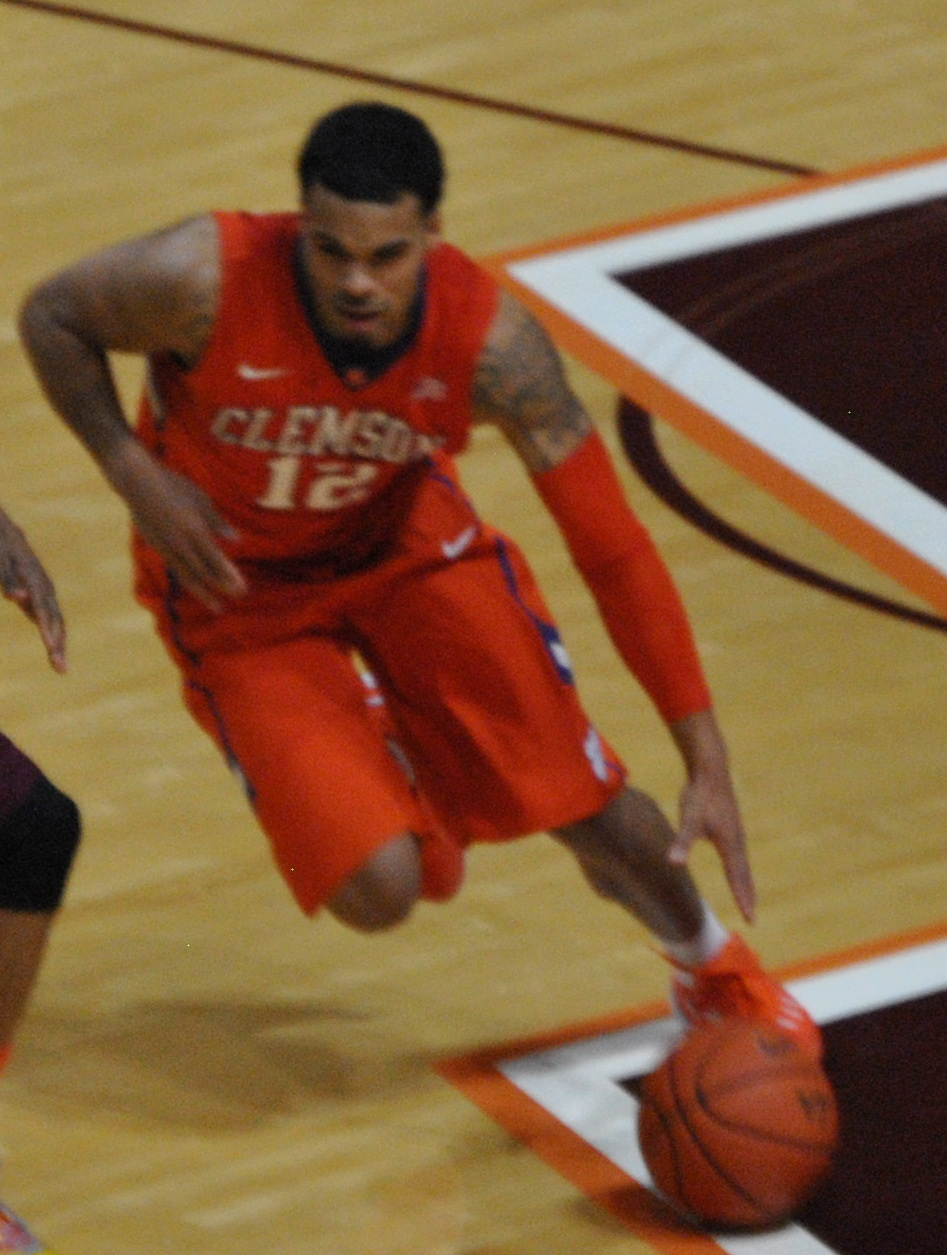
- Holmes playing for Clemson

No. 12 – Fuerza Regia de Monterrey
- Position: Point guard
- League: LNBP

Personal information
- Born: February 20, 1994 (age 32) Salem, Oregon, U.S.
- Listed height: 6 ft 2 in (1.88 m)
- Listed weight: 175 lb (79 kg)

Career information
- High school: North Salem (Salem, Oregon)
- College: San Francisco (2012–2014); Clemson (2015–2017)
- NBA draft: 2017: undrafted
- Playing career: 2017–present

Career history
- 2017: Panionios
- 2017–2018: Santa Cruz Warriors
- 2018: Agua Caliente Clippers
- 2018–2019: Soles de Mexicali
- 2019–2020: Aguacateros de Michoacán
- 2021–2022: Astros de Jalisco
- 2022–2023: Halcones de Xalapa
- 2024: US Monastir
- 2024: Diablos Rojos del México
- 2025: Fuerza Regia de Monterrey
- 2026: Leones de Ponce
- 2026: Toros Laguna
- 2026–present: Fuerza Regia de Monterrey

Avry Holmes (born February 20, 1994) is an American professional basketball player for Fuerza Regia de Monterrey of the Liga Nacional de Baloncesto Profesional (LNBP). He was drafted 66th overall by the Santa Cruz Warriors in the 2017 NBA G-League draft.

== Career ==
Holmes starred at North Salem High School. He was named second-team all-state as a junior and first-team all-state as a senior.

Holmes played two seasons for San Francisco and averaged 12.5 points and 3.1 assists per game as a sophomore. In May 2014, he announced he was transferring to Clemson. He averaged 10 points per game as a junior and started all 31 contests. As a senior at Clemson, Holmes averaged 10.3 points, 2.4 rebounds, and 1.3 assists per game.

On September 26, 2017, Holmes was signed by Panionios in Greece.

Holmes was selected in the third round of the 2017 NBA G League draft by the Santa Cruz Warriors and signed with the team. In his first season for Santa Cruz, he averaged 6.2 points and 1.6 assists per game.

In October 2018 he was traded to the Agua Caliente Clippers of the G League for a 3rd round pick. He was placed on waivers on November 1.

Holmes joined Mexican team Soles de Mexicali in December 2018.

Holmes spent the 2019–20 season in Mexico with Aguacateros de Michoacán. On September 2, 2021, he signed with Astros de Jalisco.

In May 2024, Holmes joined the Tunisian team US Monastir for the 2024 BAL playoffs.
