= Karim Rodriguez =

American-born Mexican basketball player (born 1988)

No. 8 – Lobos de Puebla
- Position: Shooting guard
- League: LNBP

Personal information
- Born: 17 January 1988 (age 38) San Diego, California, U.S.
- Listed height: 6 ft 5 in (1.96 m)
- Listed weight: 190 lb (86 kg)

Career information
- College: Allen University (2007–2010)
- NBA draft: 2010: undrafted
- Playing career: 2012–present

Career history
- 2012–2013: Halcones Rojos Veracruz
- 2013: Tijuana Zonkeys
- 2016: Tijuana Zonkeys
- 2016: Panteras de Aguascalientes
- 2017: Tijuana Zonkeys
- 2017: Fuerza Regia de Monterrey
- 2018: Tijuana Zonkeys
- 2018: Aguacateros de Michoacán
- 2019: Astros de Jalisco
- 2019: Fuerza Regia de Monterrey
- 2020–2023: Astros de Jalisco
- 2024: Apaches de Chihuahua
- 2024: Rayos de Hermosillo
- 2024: Lobos Plateados de la BUAP
- 2025: Apaches de Chihuahua
- 2025–2026: Astros de Jalisco
- 2026–present: Lobos de Puebla

Karim Scott Rodriguez Carrazco (born 17 January 1988) is an American-born Mexican professional basketball player for the Astros de Jalisco of the Liga Nacional de Baloncesto Profesional LNBP, and the Mexican National Team.

== Career ==
Rodriguez made his debut in the 2012 season with the Halcones Rojos Veracruz to play in the LNBP, he also have played for the teams Panteras de Aguascalientes, Fuerza Regia de Monterrey, Aguacateros de Michoacán, Astros de Jalisco and Lobos Plateados de la BUAP from the same league. He also has played in CIBACOPA for Tijuana Zonkeys, Astros de Jalisco and Rayos de Hermosillo.

== National team career ==
He was a member of the Mexican national team that participated in the 2022 FIBA AmeriCup qualification and in the 2025 FIBA AmeriCup qualification.
