= Eugene Phelps =

American basketball player

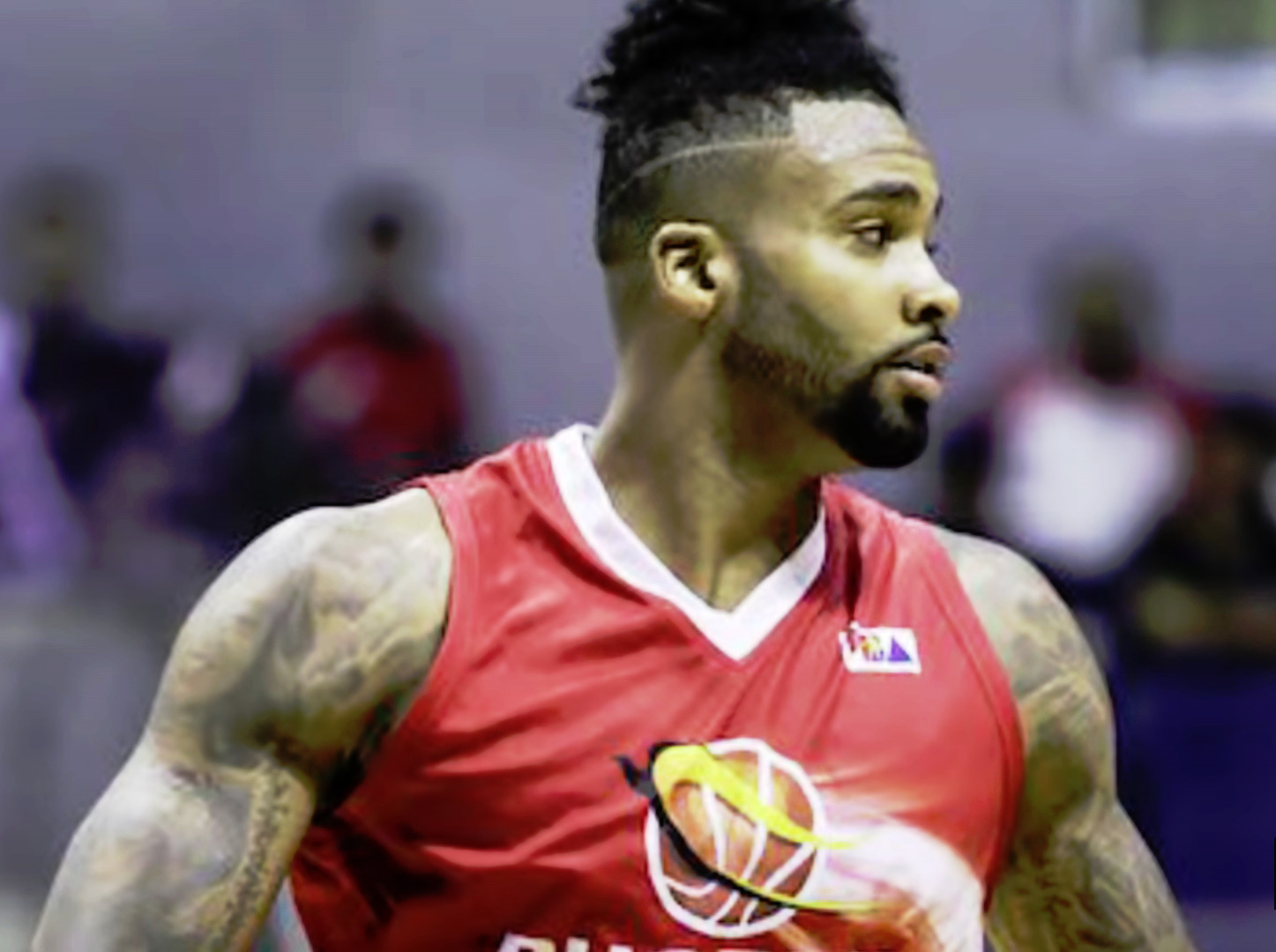

No. 14 – Astros de Jalisco
- Position: Small forward / power forward
- League: LNBP

Personal information
- Born: January 23, 1990 (age 36) Los Angeles, California, U.S.
- Listed height: 6 ft 6 in (1.98 m)
- Listed weight: 225 lb (102 kg)

Career information
- High school: Woodland Christian (Woodland Hills, California)
- College: Long Beach State (2009–2012)
- NBA draft: 2012: undrafted
- Playing career: 2012–present

Career history
- 2012–2013: Abejas de León
- 2013: Frayles de Guasave
- 2013–2014: Soles de Mexicali
- 2014: Capitanes de Arecibo
- 2014–2015: Fuerza Regia
- 2015: Capitanes de Arecibo
- 2015–2016: Fuerza Regia
- 2016: Brujos de Guayama
- 2016: Phoenix Fuel Masters
- 2016–2017: Kinmen Kaoliang Liquor Basketball
- 2017: Brujos de Guayama
- 2017: Phoenix Fuel Masters
- 2017-2018: Soles de Mexicali
- 2018: Phoenix Fuel Masters
- 2018–2019: Seoul Samsung Thunders
- 2019: Atléticos de San Germán
- 2019: Phoenix Fuel Masters
- 2019–2020: Ryukyu Golden Kings
- 2020–2024: Ehime Orange Vikings
- 2024–2026: Toyama Grouses
- 2026–present: Astros de Jalisco

Career highlights
- KBL All-Star (2019); Mexican League champion (2018); Mexican League Finals MVP (2018); 3× Mexican League All-Star (2014–2016); 3× Mexican League All-Imports Team (2014, 2016, 2018); 3× All-LNBP First Team (2014, 2016, 2018); Mexican League Import Player of the Year (2018); SBL All-Star (2017); SBL All-Star MVP (2017); SBL scoring champion (2017); SBL rebounding leader (2017); Second-team All-Big West (2012)

Eugene Hasson Phelps (born January 23, 1990) is an American professional basketball player for the Toyama Grouses of the B2 League.

== College career ==
Eugene Phelps attended Long Beach University for his college years. He became a part of the school's basketball team, the Long Beach State 49ers that fought in the NCAA. In his NCAA debut, Phelps recorded 8 points and 3 rebounds in just 17 minutes of playing time for the 49ers. On his third game, Phelps led the 49ers to an OT win over the visiting Weber State Wildcats. In that game, Phelps recorded 13 points, 6 rebounds and 2 assists in 29 minutes of playing time. On February 6, 2009, Phelps almost recorded a double-double after he racked up 9 points and 9 rebounds in a 76-82 loss to the UC Davis Aggies.

In his freshman season, he led the 49ers to an overall record of 15-15. In the semifinals round, the 49ers were up against the Pacific Tigers. In the first half, the Tigers held a 3-point lead over the 49ers. However, the Tigers again outscored the 49ers in the second half, 36-34. And with that, the 49ers bowed down against the Tigers, 60-65. In that game, Phelps recorded 3 points and 4 rebounds in just 13 minutes of playing time.

He averaged 3.7 points, 2.6 rebounds and 0.5 assists on 50% shooting from the field, in 30 games played in his freshman season.

== Professional career ==
Phelps went undrafted in the 2012 NBA draft. And with that, he was motivated to continue his passion for a basketball career overseas.

=== Abejas de León (2012–2013) ===
Phelps signed with the Abejas de León of the Liga Nacional de Baloncesto Profesional or LNBP in Mexico, for his first assignment of professional basketball.

In his first professional start, Phelps recorded 21 points, 6 rebounds and 6 assists for the Abejas but in a losing effort to the Fuerza Regia. Three games later, he recorded a then career-high of 34 points to go along with 11 rebounds and 2 assists in a 106-84 win over the Gansos Salvajes UIC.

=== Phoenix Fuel Masters (2016-2019) ===
Phelps first played for the Phoenix Fuel Masters in 2016 in the PBA Governor's Cup. He scored 52 points in his debut, which was a win against the Globalport Batang Pier. His team made the playoffs, but lost in the quarterfinals against the TNT Katropa.

Phelps returned for the 2017 Commissioner's Cup. In a double-overtime win, he finished with 53 points and 21 rebounds. That would be his last for the tournament as he left for Mexico after that game. In the Governor's Cup, he only played four games where it was revealed he had a stress fracture, forcing him to miss the remainder of the conference.

In 2018, he was brought back to replace James White after White was placed on the injury list.

Phelps returned for the fourth time in the 2019 Governor's Cup, but after struggling with a 2-5 record, was replaced with Alonzo Gee.

== Career statistics ==
=== International ===
Legend
| GP | Games played | MPG | Minutes per game | FG% | Field goal percentage |
| 3P% | 3-point field goal percentage | FT% | Free throw percentage | RPG | Rebounds per game |
| APG | Assists per game | SPG | Steals per game | BPG | Blocks per game |
| PPG | Points per game | **Bold** | Career high | | Led the league |

| Year | Team | League | GP | MPG | FG% | 3P% | FT% | RPG | APG | SPG | BPG | PPG |
|---|---|---|---|---|---|---|---|---|---|---|---|---|
| 2012-13 | Abejas de León | LNBP | 43 | 31.5 | .532 | .264 | .531 | 8.3 | 2.8 | 1.1 | .5 | 21.6 |
| 2012-13 | Frayles de Guasave | CIBACOPA | 12 | 29.8 | .520 | .000 | .671 | 8.8 | 1.8 | .5 | 1.3 | 16.9 |
| 2013-14 | Soles de Mexicali | LNBP | 45 | 30.9 | .491 | .154 | .556 | 10.3 | 2.2 | .7 | .7 | 17.2 |
| 2013-14 | Capitanes de Arecibo | BSN | 13 | 26.9 | .505 | .000 | .542 | 9.6 | 1.2 | .9 | .5 | 9.7 |
| 2014-15 | Fuerza Regia | LNBP | 39 | 31.6 | .563 | .357 | .570 | 9.9 | 1.9 | .7 | .4 | 21.2 |
| 2014-15 | Capitanes de Arecibo | BSN | 38 | 23.2 | .556 | .000 | .497 | 7.9 | 1.2 | .4 | .5 | 11.7 |
| 2014-15 | Fuerza Regia | Liga das Américas | 3 | 31.3 | .649 | .000 | .650 | 8.0 | 2.3 | .3 | .3 | 20.3 |
| 2015-16 | Fuerza Regia | LNBP | 43 | 31.8 | .549 | .031 | .628 | 10.0 | 2.9 | .7 | .6 | 19.8 |
| 2015-16 | Brujos de Guayama | BSN | 24 | 29.5 | .513 | .250 | .578 | 9.4 | 3.3 | .7 | .6 | 16.9 |
| 2015-16 | Phoenix Fuel Masters | PBA | 10 | 42.9 | .508 | .176 | .729 | **19.5** | 3.8 | .4 | .8 | **36.4** |
| 2016-17 | Phoenix Fuel Masters | PBA | 5 | 35.7 | .526 | .333 | .567 | 16.8 | 2.6 | .0 | 2.2 | 31.8 |
| 2016-17 | Brujos de Guayama | BSN | 4 | 28.2 | .527 | .000 | .697 | 10.8 | 1.3 | .5 | .5 | 20.3 |
| 2016-17 | Kinmen Kaoliang Liquor | SBL | 28 | 39.0 | .488 | .200 | .636 | 16.3 | 2.3 | 1.2 | 1.2 | 29.3 |
| 2017-18 | Soles de Mexicali | LNBP | **54** | 30.8 | .582 | .188 | .560 | 8.6 | 2.0 | .7 | .8 | 21.2 |
| 2017-18 | Phoenix Fuel Masters | PBA | 20 | 42.7 | .483 | .120 | .547 | 18.5 | **4.4** | .8 | **2.5** | 29.1 |
| 2017-18 | Soles de Mexicali | Liga das Américas | 1 | 28.0 | .500 | .000 | .167 | 11.0 | 1.0 | **4.0** | .0 | 9.0 |
| 2018-19 | Seoul Samsung Thunders | KBL | 37 | 34.3 | .523 | .222 | .568 | 13.5 | 3.1 | .6 | 1.6 | 26.2 |
| 2018-19 | Atléticos de San Germán | BSN | 25 | 31.8 | .468 | .000 | .659 | 10.4 | 2.7 | .5 | 1.2 | 17.0 |
| Career | | All Leagues | 416 | 31.4 | .530 | .196 | .578 | 10.4 | 2.5 | .7 | .8 | 20.1 |

== Personal life ==
Eugene Phelps was born in Los Angeles, California. In his college life, he attended the Long Beach State University from 2009 until 2012. He graduated with the degree of communication studies.
