= Facundo Murías =

Argentine basketball coach (born 1992)

Personal information
- Born: 20 February 1992 (age 34) Junín, Buenos Aires, Argentina
- Position: Head coach
- Coaching career: 2011–present

Career history

Coaching
- 2011–2015: Ciclista Juninense (Assistant)
- 2015–2016: Petrolero Argentino (Assistant)
- 2016–2017: Club La Unión (Assistant)
- 2017–2018: CB ABA Ancud (Assistant)
- 2018–2021: Club Florentino Ameghino (Assistant)
- 2021–2023: Plateros de Fresnillo (Assistant)
- 2021–2022: CB ABA Ancud (Assistant)
- 2022: Fuerza Regia de Monterrey (women) (Assistant)
- 2023–2026: Toros Laguna
- 2023: Plateras de Fresnillo
- 2023: Correbasket UAT
- 2023–2025: Halcones de Xalapa (Assistant)
- 2025: Prishtina (Assistant)

Facundo Murías (born 20 February 1992) is an Argentine basketball coach. He is the head coach of the Toros Laguna.

== Coaching career ==
Murías started his coaching career in Argentina as part of the staff of Ciclista Juninense in 2011. In 2023 he was appointed as head coach of Plateras de Fresnillo of LNBPF. On 2023, he signed with Toros Laguna of LBE. In the same year, he joined as head coach of Correbasket UAT of LNBP. From 2023 to 2025 he was part of the staff of Halcones de Xalapa and Prishtina, being a collaborator of Paco Olmos.
