= North Salem High School =

North Salem High School may refer to:

- North Salem Middle/High School, North Salem, New York
- North Salem High School (Salem, Oregon)
