= Timajh Parker-Rivera =

American basketball player (born 1994)

No. 15 – Gigantes de Carolina
- Position: Power forward / center
- League: BSN

Personal information
- Born: February 9, 1994 (age 32) Milford, Connecticut, U.S.
- Listed height: 6 ft 8 in (2.03 m)
- Listed weight: 235 lb (107 kg)

Career information
- High school: St. Joseph's High School (Trumbull, Connecticut)
- College: Towson (2012–2016)
- NBA draft: 2016: undrafted
- Playing career: 2016–present

Career history
- 2016–2017: SSV Lokomotive Bernau
- 2017–2018: S.C. Lusitâni
- 2018–2019: Huracanes de Tampico
- 2019: Halcones de Ciudad Obregón
- 2019: Laguneros de La Comarca
- 2019: Leñadores de Durango
- 2020–2021: Cariduros de Fajardo
- 2021: Caballos de Coclé
- 2021: Gigantes de Carolina
- 2021: Astros de Jalisco
- 2022: Grises de Humacao
- 2022–2023: Urunani
- 2023–2024: Grises de Humacao
- 2024–2025: Santeros de Aguada
- 2026–present: Gigantes de Carolina

Timajh Parker-Rivera (born February 9, 1994) is an American-Puerto Rican professional basketball player for the Gigantes de Carolina of the Baloncesto Superior Nacional (BSN). He played college basketball at Towson University, and was selected by Cariduros de Fajardo with the fourth overall pick in the 2020 BSN draft. Internationally he represents the Puerto Rico national team.

== Early life ==
Parker-Rivera was rated by ESPN as the second-best player in Connecticut for the 2012 high school class. He won two consecutive state championships, and earned two all-state selections. He was named MVP in 2010 after averaging 17.2 points per game and 10.1 rebounds per game and was invited to the Reebok All-American camp in 2011.

== College career ==
As a freshman in 2012-2013, Parker-Rivera averaged 2.8 points per game and 3.1 rebounds per game in 15.3 minutes per game. As a sophomore he started all 36 games, averaging 6.2 points per game and 5.2 rebounds per game. As a junior, Parker-Rivera started 31 of 32 games, offering a senior a chance to start on Senior Night. He averaged 7.1 points per game and 5.9 rebounds per game.

As a senior, he started all 33 games. He averaged 6.7 points per game and 6.6 rebounds per game, along with 1.2 blocks per game. He was named to the Colonial Athletic Association All-Defensive team.

During his senior season, Parker-Rivera became the all-time program leader in victories (75) and games played (132). He is also sixth all-time in blocked shots (128) and seventh in rebounding (687).

== Professional career ==
As a rookie with Fajardo, Parker-Rivera played in five games, and averaged 6.6 points per game and 9.6 rebounds per game in 27 minutes per game. The following year, the team was relocated to Carolina under the same management. In his second season he played in 30 games and averaged 10.8 points per game and 9.3 rebounds per game in 29 minutes per game.

In the off-season, he was traded to Grises de Humacao for the first overall pick in the 2022 BSN draft, which became Tremont Waters.

In November 2022, Parker-Rivera was on the roster of Burundian club Urunani in the 2023 Road to BAL.

== National team career ==
Parker-Rivera has represented Puerto Rico internationally. In the pre-trials for the Tokyo Olympics 2020, he was selected for the team in Serbia. He averaged 1.5 points per game and 3.5 rebounds per game in 16.9 minutes per game.

In the 2022 FIBA World Cup qualifiers, Parker-Rivera played all three games, averaging 16.3 minutes per game. He contributed 2.7 points per game and 3.3 rebounds per game.
