= Eddie Girón =

Mexican basketball player (born 1997)

No. 2 – Soles de Mexicali
- Position: Small forward
- League: LNBP

Personal information
- Born: 17 October 1997 (age 29) Panama City, Panama
- Listed height: 6 ft 5 in (1.96 m)
- Listed weight: 190 lb (86 kg)

Career information
- High school: Harmony Science Academy
- College: Western New Mexico Mustangs (2017–2020)
- NBA draft: 2020: undrafted
- Playing career: 2020–present

Career history
- 2020–2021: Fuerza Regia de Monterrey
- 2021: Leñadores de Durango
- 2022: Halcones de Xalapa
- 2023: Toros Laguna
- 2023: Correbasket UAT
- 2025–present: Toros Laguna
- 2025: Fuerza Regia de Monterrey
- 2026–present: Soles de Mexicali

Eduardo Girón Villarreal (born 17 October 1997) is a Panamanian-born Mexican professional basketball player for Soles de Mexicali of the Liga Nacional de Baloncesto Profesional (LNBP).

== Career ==
Girón made his debut in the 2020 season with the Fuerza Regia de Monterrey to play in the LNBP. In the 2021 season he played with Leñadores de Durango. In 2022 he signed with Halcones de Xalapa. In 2023 he signed with Toros Laguna and Correbasket UAT.

== National team career ==
In 2023, he was a member of the Mexican national team that participated in the 2023 Pan American Games.

== Personal life ==
Girón was born in Mexico to a Panamanian father and Mexican mother. His brothers Gabriel and Daniel are also basketball players. Daniel represents Panama internationally.
