= LNBP Most Valuable Player =

The Liga Nacional de Baloncesto Profesional (LNBP) Most Valuable Player Award is an annual award given to the most valuable player in the Mexican highest professional basketball league. The award is given after the regular season.

== Winners ==
Key
Player (X)	Name of the player and number of times they had won the award at that point (if more than one)
Club (X)	Name of the club and the number of times a player of it has won the award (if more than one)
†	Denotes player whose team won championship that year
	Denotes player who is still active in the LNBP

Season	Player	Position	Nationality	Club	Ref
2017–18	Juan Toscano-Anderson	Small forward	Mexico (Note: Juan Toscano-Anderson was born in Oakland, California and owns the American nationality.)	Fuerza Regia de Monterrey	
2018–19	Rigoberto Mendoza	Guard	Dominican Republic	Capitanes de la Ciudad de México	
2020	Jerome Meyinsse	Center	USA	Aguacateros de Michoacán	West District MVP
2020	Eric Dawson	Center	USA	Mineros de Zacatecas	East District MVP
2021	Vander Blue	Shooting guard	USA	Libertadores de Querétaro	West District MVP
2021	Durrell Summers	Small forward	USA	Dorados de Chihuahua	East District MVP

== Awards won by nationality ==
Country	Total
United States	4
Mexico	1
Dominican Republic	1

== Awards won by club ==
Country	Total
Fuerza Regia de Monterrey	1
Capitanes de la Ciudad de México	1
Aguacateros de Michoacán	1
Mineros de Zacatecas	1
Libertadores de Querétaro	1
Dorados de Chihuahua	1
