= John Taylor (basketball) =

American basketball player (born 1989)

No. 24 – Colegio Los Leones de Quilpué
- Position: Point guard
- League: Liga Sudamericana de Básquetbol; Liga Nacional de Básquetbol de Chile

Personal information
- Born: December 25, 1989 (age 36) Chicago, Illinois
- Listed height: 6 ft 1 in (1.85 m)
- Listed weight: 175 lb (79 kg)

Career information
- High school: North Lawndale (Chicago, Illinois)
- College: Mott CC (2010–2012); Fresno Pacific (2012–2013)
- NBA draft: 2013: undrafted
- Playing career: 2013–present

Career history
- 2013: Team Amsterdam
- 2013: Team Lugano
- 2013: Sacramento Heatwave Sacramento Kings(nba), Bakersfield Jam(nbadl)
- 2019–2020: Laguneros de La Comarca
- 2020–present: Colegio Los Leones de Quilpué

Career highlights
- LNBP top scorer (2019); Illinois 2A State Champion (2008); Illinois City Champion (2009); 2x 1st team All State Illinois; #6 prospect in state of Illinois #1 Point Guard class of 2009

John Taylor (born December 25, 1989) is an American professional basketball player for Pioneros de Los Mochis. He played college basketball at Fresno Pacific where he led the NCAA Division II in scoring his junior year before declaring for the 2013 NBA draft.

== High school career ==
Taylor attended Gary Lew Wallace until his sophomore year then transferred back home to North Lawndale High School in Chicago, Illinois for his last 2 years and led them to a 2A state title as a junior and a City League championship as a senior in 2009. He was the 6th best player in Chicago according to Rivals. And the #1 Point Guard of his class (09).

College recruiting
Name	Hometown	School	Height	Weight	Commit date
John Taylor; Point Guard	Chicago, Illinois	North Lawndale High School	6 ft 1 in (1.85 m)	170 lb (77 kg)	
John Taylor; Point Guard	Recruit ratings: Scout: Rivals: ESPN: (NR)				

== College career ==
Taylor attended Chipola Community College his freshman year then went on to transfer to Mott Community College for his final juco year. He was the JUCO Player of the Year in 2012 after scoring 24.9 points per game and scoring over 40 in three different contests. He also led Mott to a NJCAA DIV2 championship in JUCO his sophomore season. After Mott, Taylor committed to Fresno Pacific in June 2012. He spent one season at the school and he led NCAA Division II in scoring with 27.5 points per game and had a career-high 50 points against Roberts Wesleyan. He was named the PacWest Newcomer of the Year. And holds the record for most points scored (50) in Fresno Pacific history.

== Professional career ==
Taylor declared for the 2013 NBA draft but went undrafted. He went to the 2013 Eurobasket summer league tryouts, but did not make a team. He was then later signed to Team Amsterdam of the Eurobasket S-League and later signed to Team Lugano of the Eurobasket S-League. After that he was signed to the Sacramento Heatwave of the American Basketball Association. After the first game with the Sacramento Heatwave he signed to play in one of Mexico's top leagues (LNBP) with Juarez Indios and became a household name in South America.
