= Laguneros de La Comarca =

- League: LNBP
- Founded: 2018
- Dissolved: 2020
- History: Laguneros de La Comarca (2018–2020)
- Arena: Auditorio Municipal de Torreón
- Capacity: 4,363
- Location: Torreón, Mexico
- Team colors: Purple, white, black
- Head coach: Marcelo Elusich
Home	Away

Laguneros de la Comarca (English: Comarca Lakers) is a professional Mexican basketball team, based in Torreón, Coahuila. The Laguneros are part of the Liga Nacional de Baloncesto Profesional, the top professional basketball league in Mexico. The team plays its home games at the Auditorio Municipal de Torreón, with a capacity of 4,363 spectators.

== History ==
Laguneros was founded in 2018 and joined the Liga Nacional de Baloncesto Profesional for the 2018–19 season, joiningHuracanes de Tampico and Leñadores de Durango as expansion teams.

The team chose purple, black and white as their colors and the nickname Laguneros, which is the demonym for people from the Comarca Lagunera, a region in the states of Coahuila and Durango, that would roughly translate into "people from the lagoons".

Previously, the Laguna region had professional basketball representation in the LNBP with two teams: Algodoneros de la Comarca and Jefes de Fuerza Lagunera, both teams played in the city of Torreón.

== Players ==
=== Current roster ===
Note: Flags indicate national team eligibility at FIBA-sanctioned events. Players may hold other non-FIBA nationalities not displayed.

Laguneros de La Comarca roster
Players
Coaches

Pos.	No.	Nat.	Name	Ht.	Wt.
G	6	(Mexico)	Fernández, Armando	1.90 m (6 ft 3 in)	86 kg (190 lb)
F	7	(Mexico)	Herrera, Diego	1.99 m (6 ft 6 in)	103 kg (227 lb)
F	13	(United States)	Steen, Trenton	2.03 m (6 ft 8 in)	102 kg (225 lb)
F	17	(Mexico)	Cheda, Mauricio	1.98 m (6 ft 6 in)	93 kg (205 lb)
C	20	(Mexico)	Morón, José	2.02 m (6 ft 8 in)	102 kg (225 lb)
G	24	(United States)	Taylor, John	1.85 m (6 ft 1 in)	79 kg (174 lb)
G	27	(Mexico)	Salazar, Chase	1.71 m (5 ft 7 in)	68 kg (150 lb)
F	35	(Puerto Rico)	Matías, Ángel	1.95 m (6 ft 5 in)	102 kg (225 lb)
G	47	(United States)	Lee, Raven	1.90 m (6 ft 3 in)	84 kg (185 lb)

Head coach

- (Argentina) Marcelo Elusich

Assistant coach(es)

- (Argentina) Facundo Burgos

Legend

- (C) Team captain
- Injured

- Roster
Updated: October 14, 2020
