= Pablo García (basketball coach) =

Spanish basketball coach

Soles de Mexicali
- Position: Head coach
- League: LNBP

Personal information
- Born: 8 October 1989 (age 37) Málaga, Spain
- Coaching career: 2010–present

Career history

Coaching
- 2010–2017: Reserves teams of Baloncesto Málaga
- 2017–2020: Soles de Mexicali (assistant)
- 2021: Abejas de León
- 2022: CB Marbella
- 2022: Abejas de León
- 2023–2025: Fuerza Regia de Monterrey
- 2026: Fibwi Palma
- 2026–present: Soles de Mexicali

Pablo García Fernández (born 8 May 1989) is a Spanish basketball coach. He last coached Fibwi Palma of the Spanish Primera FEB.

== Coaching career ==
García started his coaching career in Spain with the reserve teams of Baloncesto Málaga.

In the 2017–20 season, he was the assistant coach for Soles de Mexicali in Mexico. In 2021 he joined Abejas de León, where he won the 2022 championship. In 2022 he signed with CB Marbella.

On 2023, García signed with the Fuerza Regia de Monterrey. In his first season, he won the 2023 championship.

On April 2, 2026, he signed with Fibwi Palma to become the team's new head coach.
