= Juan Contreras =

Mexican basketball player (born 1997)

No. 7 – Soles de Mexicali
- Position: Point guard
- League: LNBP

Personal information
- Born: 18 March 1997 (age 29) Zacatecas City, Zacatecas, Mexico
- Listed height: 6 ft 2 in (1.88 m)
- Listed weight: 205 lb (93 kg)

Career information
- College: ITESM
- Playing career: 2021–present

Career history
- 2021: Indios de Ciudad Juárez
- 2021–2026: Caballeros de Culiacán
- 2021–2026: Abejas de León
- 2026–present: Soles de Mexicali

Juan Ángel Contreras Muro (born 18 March 1997) is a Mexican professional basketball player for Soles de Mexicali of the Liga Nacional de Baloncesto Profesional (LNBP).

== Career ==
Contreras made his debut in the 2021 season with the Abejas de León to play in the LNBP, he won the championship in the 2022 season. In 2021 he signed with Caballeros de Culiacán in the CIBACOPA. In 2024 he signed with Apaches de Chihuahua in the LBE.

== National team career ==
In 2024, he was a member of the preliminary list of the Mexican national team that participated in the 2024 FIBA Men's Olympic Qualifying Tournaments.
