= Juan Toscano-Anderson =

Mexican-American basketball player (born 1993)

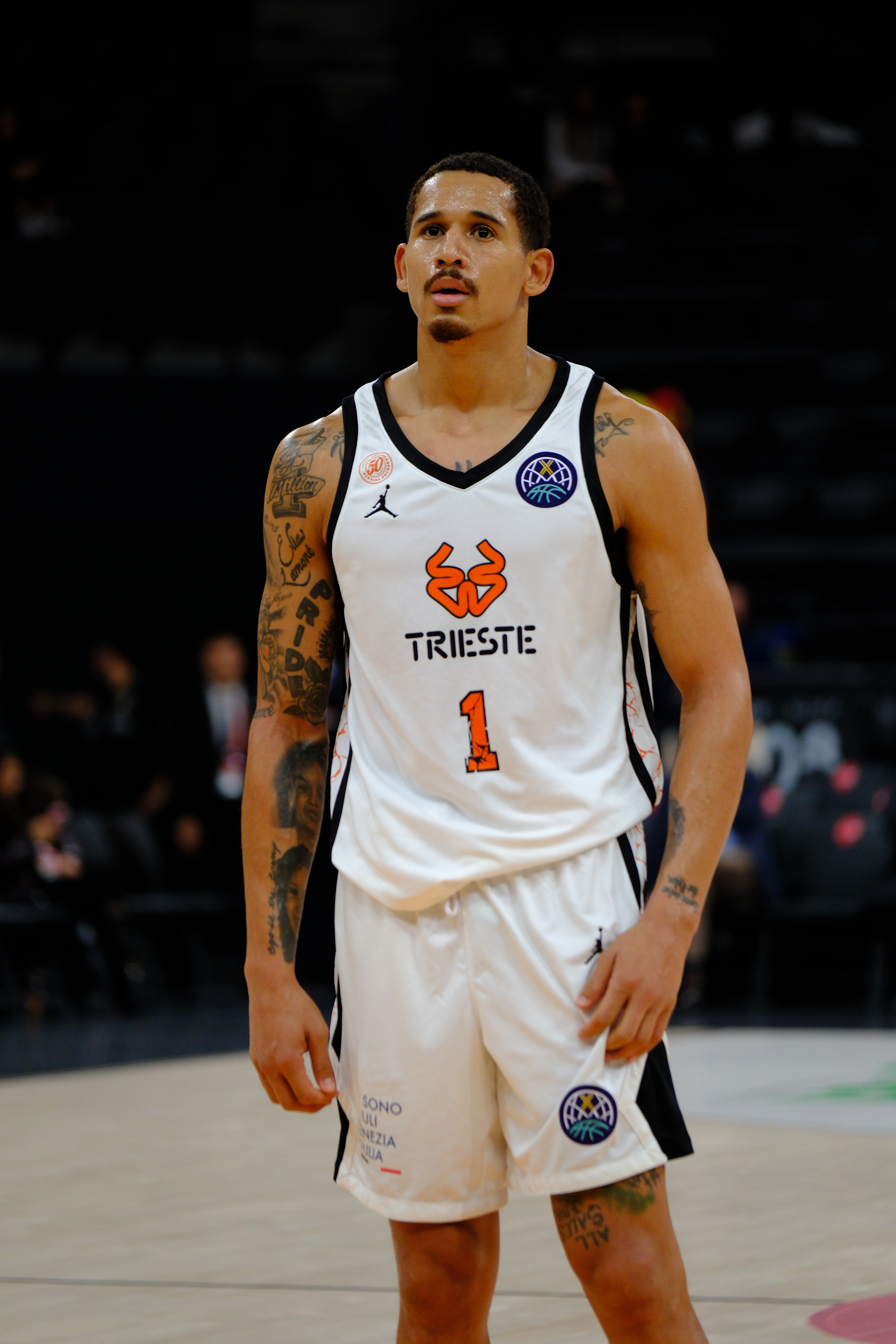
- Toscano-Anderson with Pallacanestro Trieste in 2025

Free agent
- Position: Small forward / power forward

Personal information
- Born: April 10, 1993 (age 33) Oakland, California, U.S.
- Listed height: 6 ft 6 in (1.98 m)
- Listed weight: 209 lb (95 kg)

Career information
- High school: Castro Valley (Castro Valley, California)
- College: Marquette (2011–2015)
- NBA draft: 2015: undrafted
- Playing career: 2015–present

Career history
- 2015–2016: Soles de Mexicali
- 2016: Bucaneros de La Guaira
- 2016–2018: Fuerza Regia
- 2018–2020: Santa Cruz Warriors
- 2020–2022: Golden State Warriors
- 2022–2023: Los Angeles Lakers
- 2023: Utah Jazz
- 2023: Mexico City Capitanes
- 2023–2024: Sacramento Kings
- 2024–2025: Mexico City Capitanes
- 2024: NBA G League United
- 2025–2026: Pallacanestro Trieste

Career highlights
- NBA champion (2022); 2× LNBP champion (2017, 2019); LNBP Most Valuable Player (2018); 2× LNBP All-Star (2016, 2017); 2× LNBP All-Star Game MVP (2016, 2017)
- Stats at NBA.com
- Stats at Basketball Reference

Juan Ronel Toscano-Anderson (born April 10, 1993) is a Mexican-American professional basketball player who last played for Pallacanestro Trieste of the Lega Basket Serie A (LBA). He played college basketball for the Marquette Golden Eagles. He won an NBA championship with the Golden State Warriors in 2022. He has also played in the NBA for the Los Angeles Lakers, Utah Jazz, and Sacramento Kings.

== Early life and career ==
Toscano was born in East Oakland, California to an African-American father and Mexican-American mother; his maternal grandfather immigrated to the U.S. from Michoacán in the 1960s. Toscano-Anderson grew up speaking Spanish and celebrating both Mexican and American holidays. His current jersey number of 95 is a tribute to his boyhood home on Oakland's 95th Avenue.

During his high school and college years, Toscano-Anderson self identified as Juan Anderson for simplicity reasons. As a senior, he led Castro Valley High School to a record-setting campaign in the 2010-11 season, posting the program's most wins in a season with a record of 30-2 and claimed its first league and North Coast Section titles. The team also advanced to the Northern California Division I title game. Toscano-Anderson averaged 16.6 points, 7.0 rebounds, and 5.0 assists per game during the season and was subsequently named first team all-league, all-metro, and third team all-state. Toscano-Anderson was ranked 61st in the country by Rivals.com among all 2011 basketball recruits.

== College career ==
=== Freshman year ===
Toscano-Anderson began playing for Marquette in the 2011-12 NCAA season. He was inactive for Marquette's first three games of the regular season due to an NCAA suspension, and he made his collegiate debut against Mississippi on November 20, 2011. During a game versus Wisconsin, Toscano-Anderson made his first collegiate field goal during seven minutes off the bench, and added five rebounds and an assist in a win. Toscano-Anderson missed a game against Green Bay scheduled on December 10 due to a shoulder injury. Toscano-Anderson picked up his first collegiate steal and scored two points versus St. John's on January 11, 2012. Toscano-Anderson played a then career-high 10 minutes versus Rutgers on February 22, contributing two points, two rebounds, two steals and his first collegiate blocked shot. Against West Virginia on February 24, Toscano-Anderson picked up three defensive rebounds in just 11 minutes of playing time.

=== Sophomore year ===
Toscano-Anderson played 21 minutes in the season-opener versus Colgate on November 11, 2012 and contributed nine points and nine rebounds, which were career-highs. He made his first collegiate start versus Butler on November 19 during the 2012 Maui Invitational Tournament, pitching in five points and six rebounds in a then career-high 22 minutes. Toscano-Anderson blocked a career-high two blocks and added three rebounds against Green Bay on December 19, 2012. Toscano-Anderson scored a season-high nine points versus North Carolina Central on December 29, scoring three field goals and three free throws, which both were career-highs. During a game versus Providence on January 26, 2013, Toscano-Anderson shot 75% from the field, including a career-best two 3-pointers to score nine points while collecting a game-high three steals. While playing a game versus DePaul on February 9, Toscano-Anderson grabbed four rebounds and collected one block. Toscano-Anderson started the game versus Davidson during the second round of the 2013 NCAA tournament, seeing 16 minutes of action, grabbing a pair of rebounds in Marquette's 59-58 over Davidson on March 23. Toscano-Anderson subsequently received the Darius Johnson-Odom "Sacrifice For The String" Award during team's postseason banquet.

=== Junior year ===
Toscano-Anderson shot 4-of-6 from the field and had a career-high 11 points and five assists in just 16 minutes of action versus Grambling State on November 12, 2013. During the game versus New Hampshire on November 21, Toscano-Anderson got 5 rebounds, with four of his five rebounds coming on the offensive glass while simultaneously adding three steals and three assists. Toscano-Anderson played a career-high 26 minutes at Wisconsin on December 7, 2013, matching his career-high with four field goals, finishing with eight points, six rebounds and a steal. Toscano-Anderson scored 10 points while matching a career-high with a team-best nine rebounds versus George Washington on December 29.

=== Senior year ===
Toscano-Anderson scored 16 points and also led the team with seven rebounds and a game-high four steals versus UT Martin on November 14, 2014. He scored a career-high 23 points on 11-of-15 shooting from the field versus Omaha on November 22, leading the team in rebounds (8), blocks (2), and steals (3), while adding four assists. Toscano-Anderson matched a career-high 9 rebounds while registering a game-high 20 points, including a career-best 8-of-13 free throws versus NJIT on November 24. During the Orlando Classic, playing against Georgia Tech on November 27, Toscano-Anderson posted 12 points, 6 rebounds, and 2 steals in the win. He also set a career-high 7 assists in a win over Arizona State on December 16 and a career-high 13 rebounds against North Dakota on December 22. Toscano-Anderson recorded 12 points and seven boards, four of which were offensive, in 38 minutes versus Butler on January 31, 2015. Toscano-Anderson was inactive for the first time all year versus Villanova on February 21, but returned to play limited minutes in the next three games, culminating with a return to the starting lineup on senior day to help the Golden Eagles win over DePaul on March 7. Toscano-Anderson went 3-of-3 for regular field goals, grabbing five boards, and passing for two assists as Marquette won against Seton Hall, 78-56 during the first round action of the 2015 Big East tournament on March 11. Toscano-Anderson subsequently concluded the 2014-15 NCAA season as the team's leading rebounder at 5.7 per game, placed second in total blocks with 12, and ranked third on the team in total steals at 35. His overall field goal percentage of 49 percent placed him second on the team, but the most of any Marquette player that attempted a 3-pointer throughout the season.

== Professional career ==
=== Soles de Mexicali (2015–2016) ===
After going undrafted in the 2015 NBA draft, on September 2, 2015, Toscano-Anderson was reported to have joined Soles de Mexicali of the Liga Nacional de Baloncesto Profesional (LNBP).

=== Bucaneros de La Guaira (2016) ===
Toscano-Anderson appeared on the Venezuelan basketball team Bucaneros de La Guaira of the Liga Profesional de Baloncesto (LPB). In his first game with Bucaneros, he recorded 15 points, 3 rebounds, and 3 assists in a 68–91 losing effort to the Marinos B.B.C.

=== Fuerza Regia de Monterrey (2016–2018) ===
Toscano-Anderson was reported to be playing for Fuerza Regia de Monterrey in his second professional basketball season.

=== Santa Cruz Warriors (2018–2020) ===
On October 22, 2018, Toscano-Anderson was included in the training camp roster of the Santa Cruz Warriors via local tryout. On November 1, 2018, he was included in the opening night roster of the Santa Cruz Warriors. He re-joined the Santa Cruz Warriors for the 2019–20 season.

=== Golden State Warriors (2020–2022) ===
On February 6, 2020, Toscano-Anderson signed a three-year deal with the Golden State Warriors. On February 23, 2020, Toscano-Anderson recorded an NBA career high 16 points against the Pelicans.

On December 19, 2020, the Warriors released Toscano-Anderson. However, they re-signed him to a two-way contract on December 22. On February 9, 2021, Toscano-Anderson was awarded the 2019–20 NBA G League’s Community Assist Award for his continued commitment to positively impacting the lives of children and families throughout the 2019–20 season.

On May 13, 2021, Toscano-Anderson's two-way contract was converted to a standard NBA contract.

On February 19, 2022, Toscano-Anderson participated in the Slam Dunk Contest; he was the first NBA player of Mexican descent to do so.

On June 16, 2022, Toscano-Anderson won the 2022 NBA Finals with the Warriors. As a member of the Warriors, he became the second basketball player of Mexican descent to win an NBA championship ring. (He was preceded by Mark Aguirre, who won with the Detroit Pistons in 1989.)

=== Los Angeles Lakers (2022–2023) ===
On July 1, 2022, Toscano-Anderson signed with the Los Angeles Lakers. Upon his return to Golden State as an opponent on October 18, 2022, Toscano-Anderson received a standing ovation from the Bay Area crowd.

=== Utah Jazz (2023) ===
On February 9, 2023, Toscano-Anderson was traded to the Utah Jazz in a three-team trade involving the Minnesota Timberwolves. He made his Jazz debut on February 15, recording seven points and ten rebounds in a 117–111 loss to the Memphis Grizzlies.

On August 8, 2023, the Golden State Warriors held a free agent workout with Toscano-Anderson.

=== Mexico City Capitanes (2023) ===
On September 30, 2023, Toscano-Anderson signed with the Mexico City Capitanes of the NBA G League.

=== Sacramento Kings (2023–2024) ===
On December 15, 2023, Toscano-Anderson signed with the Sacramento Kings, but was waived on January 7, 2024. Two days later, he signed a 10-day contract with the Kings.

=== Return to Mexico City Capitanes (2024–2025) ===
On February 21, he re-joined the Capitanes.

On October 17, 2024, Toscano-Anderson returned to the Capitanes.

=== Pallacanestro Trieste (2025–2026) ===
On August 16, 2025, Toscano-Anderson signed with Pallacanestro Trieste of the Italian Lega Basket Serie A (LBA).

== National team career ==
Toscano-Anderson was a member of the Mexico national basketball team at the 2016 FIBA World Olympic qualifying tournament in Turin, Italy. On the Mexico national team, he played as Juan Toscano because that was the name on his Mexican passport and jersey.

== Career statistics ==
Legend
GP	Games played	GS	Games started	MPG	Minutes per game
FG%	Field goal percentage	3P%	3-point field goal percentage	FT%	Free throw percentage
RPG	Rebounds per game	APG	Assists per game	SPG	Steals per game
BPG	Blocks per game	PPG	Points per game	**Bold**	Career high
†	Won an NBA championship

=== NBA ===
==== Regular season ====
Year	Team	GP	GS	MPG	FG%	3P%	FT%	RPG	APG	SPG	BPG	PPG
2019–20	Golden State	13	6	**20.9**	.460	.348	.600	4.0	2.0	**1.0**	.4	5.3
2020–21	Golden State	53	**16**	**20.9**	**.579**	**.402**	.710	**4.4**	**2.8**	.8	**.5**	**5.7**
2021–22†	Golden State	**73**	6	13.6	.489	.322	.571	2.4	1.7	.7	.2	4.1
2022–23	L.A. Lakers	30	7	12.2	.500	.200	.733	2.0	.8	.3	.2	2.7
2022–23	Utah	22	2	15.2	.403	.174	**.889**	2.9	1.8	.3	.1	3.4
2023–24	Sacramento	11	0	4.8	.250	.250	—	1.3	.4	.1	.1	.6
Career		202	37	15.5	.502	.329	.646	3.0	1.8	.6	.3	4.1

==== Playoffs ====
Year	Team	GP	GS	MPG	FG%	3P%	FT%	RPG	APG	SPG	BPG	PPG
2022†	Golden State	14	0	3.5	.400	.400	.333	.7	.6	.1	.1	.8
Career		14	0	3.5	.400	.400	.333	.7	.6	.1	.1	.8

=== Domestic leagues ===
Season	Team	League	GP	MPG	FG%	3P%	FT%	RPG	APG	SPG	BPG	PPG
2015-16	Soles de Mexicali	Mexico LNBP	54	28.7	.535	.309	.712	6.4	3.4	1.4	.6	11.1
2016-17	Bucaneros	Venezuela LPB	4	27.8	.463	.429	.900	4.0	.8	.8	.0	14.8
2016-17	Fuerza Regia	Mexico LNBP	45	26.9	.500	.379	.644	5.0	3.2	1.4	.3	11.1
2016-17	Fuerza Regia	Liga Americas	8	28.3	.523	.250	.440	5.6	2.9	1.0	.4	10.5
2017-18	Fuerza Regia	Mexico LNBP	46	29.5	.484	.280	.667	5.9	4.3	1.5	.9	13.9
2017-18	Fuerza Regia	Liga Americas	6	27.3	.446	.308	.529	4.7	3.5	1.2	.8	10.5
2018-19	Fuerza Regia	Mexico LNBP	8	22.6	.560	.250	.625	4.6	2.5	.6	.0	9.4

=== College ===
Year	Team	GP	GS	MPG	FG%	3P%	FT%	RPG	APG	SPG	BPG	PPG
2011–12	Marquette	24	0	4.5	.385	—	.667	.8	.2	.2	.0	.7
2012–13	Marquette	**35**	**31**	13.0	.330	.286	.567	2.9	.9	.6	.3	2.7
2013–14	Marquette	31	19	13.5	.378	.192	**.731**	3.3	1.0	1.0	.2	3.2
2014–15	Marquette	31	27	**28.5**	**.490**	**.348**	.553	**5.7**	**1.7**	**1.1**	**.4**	**8.3**
Career		121	77	15.4	.421	.289	.593	3.3	1.0	.8	.3	3.8
