= Fernando Benítez =

Mexican basketball player (born 1989)

No. 13 – Mineros del Parral
- Position: Center
- League: LBE

Personal information
- Born: August 6, 1989 (age 37) Nayarit, Mexico
- Listed height: 6 ft 8 in (2.03 m)
- Listed weight: 240 lb (109 kg)

Career information
- Playing career: 2011–present

Career history
- 2011–2016: Halcones Rojos Veracruz
- 2016–2017: Panteras de Aguascalientes
- 2017–2018: Capitanes de Ciudad de México
- 2018–2021: Mineros de Zacatecas
- 2021: Plateros de Fresnillo
- 2022: Indomables de Ciudad Juárez
- 2023: Astros de Jalisco
- 2024: Lobos Plateados de la BUAP
- 2025: Pioneros de Los Mochis
- 2026–present: Mineros del Parral
Medals
Men's basketball
Representing Mexico
FIBA AmeriCup
Bronze medal – third place	2017 Argentina

Fernando de Jesus Benitez Gomez (born August 6, 1989) is a Mexican professional basketball player for the Astros de Jalisco and the Mexico national basketball team.

He participated at the 2017 FIBA AmeriCup.
