= Gabriel Girón =

Mexican basketball player (born 1988)

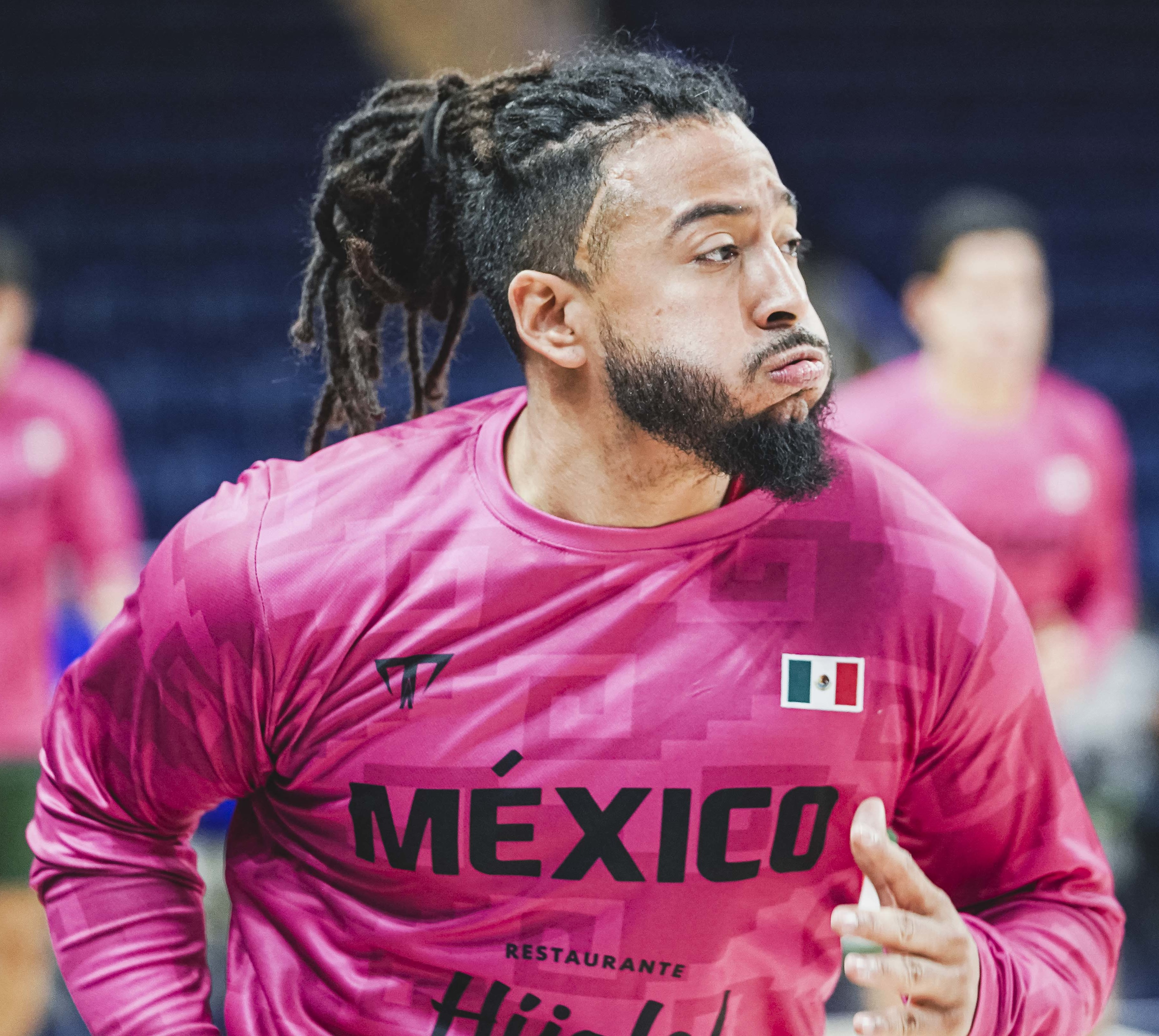
- Girón with the Mexico national basketball team in 2022

No. 24 – Panteras de Aguascalientes
- Position: Shooting guard / small forward
- League: LNBP

Personal information
- Born: 27 February 1988 (age 38) Monterrey, Mexico
- Listed height: 6 ft 4 in (1.93 m)

Career information
- Playing career: 2010–present

Career history
- 2010–2017: Fuerza Regia
- 2017–2019: Capitanes de Ciudad de México
- 2019–2020: Dorados de Chihuahua
- 2020–2021: Leñadores de Durango
- 2021–2022: Fuerza Regia
- 2022–2023: Libertadores de Querétaro
- 2024: Toros Laguna
- 2024: Halcones de Xalapa
- 2025: Real Estelí
- 2025: Toros Laguna
- 2025: Halcones de Xalapa
- 2026: Toros Laguna
- 2026–present: Panteras de Aguascalientes

Career highlights
- LNBP Sixth Man of the Year (2017)
Medals
Men's basketball
Representing Mexico
FIBA AmeriCup
Bronze medal – third place	2017 Argentina

Gabriel Oscar Girón Villarreal (born 27 February 1988) is a Mexican-Panamanian professional basketball player for the Toros Laguna of the Mexican CIBACOPA. He was a part of the 2017 Mexican championship winning Fuerza Regia team, and was a member of the Mexico national team at the 2016 Olympic qualifiers, in Turin, Italy.

== Personal life ==
Girón was born in Mexico to a Panamanian father and Mexican mother. His brothers Daniel and Eduardo are also basketball players. Daniel represents Panama internationally.
