= Adrián Zamora =

American-born Mexican basketball player

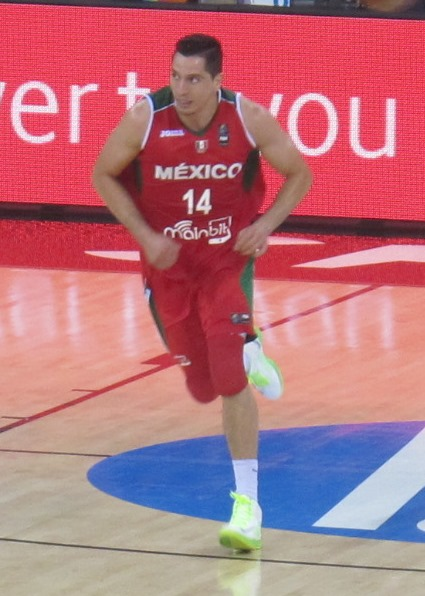

Personal information
- Born: October 28, 1986 (age 40) Watsonville, California
- Listed height: 6 ft 9 in (2.06 m)
- Listed weight: 233 lb (106 kg)

Career information
- High school: Watsonville (Watsonville, California)
- College: Gavilan College (2004–2006); Montana State (2006–2008)
- NBA draft: 2008: undrafted
- Playing career: 2008–2020
- Position: Center / Power Forward

Career history
- 2008–2011: Halcones de Xalapa
- 2011–2012: Soles de Mexicali
- 2012–2013: Huracanes de Tampico
- 2013–2016: Halcones Rojos Veracruz
- 2016–2018: Fuerza Regia
- 2018–2019: Aguacateros de Michoacán
- 2019–2020: Dorados de Chihuahua
- 2020: Aguacateros de Michoacán

Rodrigo Adrián Zamora Fernández (born 28 October 1986) is an American-born Mexican former basketball player.

Zamora is the youngest of five siblings born to Francisco Zamora and Alberta Fernández. His family is originally from Gómez Farías, Michoacán. He averaged 19.3 points, 10 rebounds and four blocks per game at Gavilan College before transferring to Montana State.

Zamora debuted with the Mexico national team in 2010.
