= Daniel Girón =

Mexican basketball player (born 1989)

No. 27 – Fuerza Regia de Monterrey
- Position: Point guard
- League: LNBP

Personal information
- Born: 29 December 1989 (age 36) Monterrey, Nuevo León, Mexico
- Listed height: 6 ft 2 in (1.88 m)
- Listed weight: 187 lb (85 kg)

Career information
- Playing career: 2014–present

Career history
- 2014: Correbasket UAT
- 2015: Halcones Rojos Veracruz
- 2016–2017: Correbasket UAT
- 2018–2019: Mexico City Capitanes
- 2020: Aguacateros de Michoacán
- 2022: Astros de Jalisco
- 2023: Plateros de Fresnillo
- 2024: Diablos Rojos del México
- 2025: Pioneros de Delicias
- 2025–present: Fuerza Regia de Monterrey
- 2026: Soles de Ojinaga
- 2026: Zonkeys de Tijuana

Daniel Girón Villarreal (born 29 December 1989) is a Mexican-born Panamanian professional basketball player.

== Career ==
Girón made his debut in the 2014 season with the Correbasket UAT to play in the LNBP. In the 2018 season he played with Mexico City Capitanes. In 2022 he signed with Astros de Jalisco. In 2024 he signed with Diablos Rojos del México.

== National team career ==
Since 2018, he has been member of the Panama men's national basketball team.

== Personal life ==
Girón was born in Mexico to a Panamanian father and Mexican mother. His brothers Gabriel and Eduardo are also basketball players.
