= 2016 PBA Governors' Cup =

- Duration: July 15 – October 19, 2016
- TV partner(s): Local: Sports5; TV5; PBA Rush (HD); International: AksyonTV International

Finals
- Champions: Barangay Ginebra San Miguel
- Runners-up: Meralco Bolts

Awards
- Best Player: Jayson Castro (TNT KaTropa)
- Best Import: Allen Durham (Meralco Bolts)
- Finals MVP: LA Tenorio (Barangay Ginebra San Miguel)

PBA Governors' Cup chronology
- < 2015 2017 >

PBA conference chronology
- < 2016 Commissioner's 2016–17 Philippine >

The 2016 Philippine Basketball Association (PBA) Governors' Cup, also known as the 2016 Oppo-PBA Governors' Cup for sponsorship reasons, was the third and last conference of the 2015–16 PBA season. Due to the preparations of the Philippines men's national basketball team for the 2016 FIBA World Olympic Qualifying Tournament, which was held in Manila, the tournament started on July 15 and ended on October 19, 2016. The tournament allowed teams to hire foreign players or imports with a height limit of 6 ft 5 in (1.96 m) for the top eight teams of combined results of the Philippine Cup and Commissioner's Cup, while the bottom four teams are allowed to hire imports with a height limit of 6 ft 9 in (2.06 m). The teams are allowed to hire an additional Asian import with a height limit of 6 ft 3 in (1.91 m).

== Format ==
The tournament format for this conference is as follows:

- Single-round robin eliminations; 11 games per team; Teams are then seeded by basis on win–loss records.
- Top eight teams will advance to the quarterfinals. In case of tie, playoff games will be held only for the #4 and #8 seeds.
- Quarterfinals (higher seed with the twice-to-beat advantage):
  - QF1: #1 seed vs #8 seed
  - QF2: #2 seed vs #7 seed
  - QF3: #3 seed vs #6 seed
  - QF4: #4 seed vs #5 seed
- Semifinals (best-of-5 series):
  - SF1: QF1 vs. QF4 winners
  - SF2: QF2 vs. QF3 winners
- Finals (best-of-7 series)
  - Winners of the semifinals

== Elimination round ==
=== Team standings ===
Pos	Team	W	L	PCT	GB	Qualification
1	TNT KaTropa	10	1	.909	—	Twice-to-beat in the quarterfinals
2	San Miguel Beermen	8	3	.727 (Note: Head-to-head record: San Miguel 1–0 Barangay Ginebra)	2	Twice-to-beat in the quarterfinals
3	Barangay Ginebra San Miguel	8	3	.727	2	Twice-to-beat in the quarterfinals
4	Meralco Bolts	6	5	.545 (Note: Head-to-head quotient: Meralco 1.039, Mahindra 1.017, Alaska 0.950; fourth seed playoff: Meralco 104–99 Mahindra)	4	Twice-to-beat in the quarterfinals
5	Mahindra Enforcer	6	5	.545	4	Twice-to-win in the quarterfinals
6	Alaska Aces	6	5	.545	4	Twice-to-win in the quarterfinals
7	NLEX Road Warriors	5	6	.455 (Note: Head-to-head quotient: NLEX 1.04, Rain or Shine 1.03, Phoenix 0.93; eighth seed playoff: Phoenix 105–94 Rain or Shine)	5	Twice-to-win in the quarterfinals
8	Phoenix Fuel Masters	5	6	.455	5	Twice-to-win in the quarterfinals
9	Rain or Shine Elasto Painters	5	6	.455	5	
10	GlobalPort Batang Pier	4	7	.364	6	
11	Star Hotshots	2	9	.182	8	
12	Blackwater Elite	1	10	.091	9	

Source: PBA.ph

=== Schedule ===
Team ╲ Game	1	2	3	4	5	6	7	8	9	10	11
Alaska Aces	MER	BGSM	TNT	MAH	ROS	SH	SMB	BW	GP	PHX	NLEX
Barangay Ginebra San Miguel	GP	ALA	NLEX	MER	BW	SMB	ROS	SH	MAH	PHX	TNT
Blackwater Elite	NLEX	SH	ROS	BGSM	TNT	MER	MAH	ALA	PHX	GP	SMB
GlobalPort Batang Pier	BGSM	MAH	SH	PHX	MER	SMB	ROS	TNT	ALA	NLEX	BW
Mahindra Enforcer	SH	GP	SMB	ALA	PHX	NLEX	BW	TNT	ROS	BGSM	MER
Meralco Bolts	PHX	ALA	TNT	BGSM	ROS	GP	BW	NLEX	SMB	SH	MAH
NLEX Road Warriors	BW	SMB	BGSM	TNT	SH	MAH	MER	PHX	ROS	GP	ALA
Phoenix Fuel Masters	MER	SMB	ROS	GP	MAH	TNT	NLEX	SH	BW	ALA	BGSM
Rain or Shine Elasto Painters	TNT	PHX	BW	MER	ALA	BGSM	GP	MAH	NLEX	SMB	SH
San Miguel Beermen	PHX	NLEX	MAH	SH	BGSM	GP	ALA	MER	TNT	ROS	BW
Star Hotshots	MAH	BW	GP	SMB	NLEX	ALA	BGSM	PHX	MER	TNT	ROS
TNT KaTropa	ROS	MER	ALA	NLEX	BW	PHX	MAH	GP	SMB	SH	BGSM

= Win; = OT win; = Loss; = OT loss

=== Results ===
Team	ALA	BGSM	BWE	GP	MAH	MER	NLEX	PHX	ROS	SMB	SH	TNT
Alaska		109–100*	107–87	133–106	95–101	96–100	100–85	103–87	114–117	103–106	85–69	118–120
Barangay Ginebra	—		107–95	93–81	93–86	107–93	85–72	96–87	101–87	105–111**	116–103	92–104
Blackwater	—	—		126–139	88–97	90–105	90–96	81–93	92–98	101–107	100–98	89–109
GlobalPort	—	—	—		98–108	126–123**	98–114	107–120	101–99	98–92	102–105*	120–122
Mahindra	—	—	—	—		83–86	81–82	94–100	88–103	105–103	100–92*	107–104
Meralco	—	—	—	—	—		101–95	108–103	109–102	106–110	103–104	95–98
NLEX	—	—	—	—	—	—		91–95*	111–99	93–94	88–85	95–101
Phoenix	—	—	—	—	—	—	—		89–106	113–124	106–93	117–124
Rain or Shine	—	—	—	—	—	—	—	—		75–82	108–97	98–101
San Miguel	—	—	—	—	—	—	—	—	—		109–100	85–105
Star	—	—	—	—	—	—	—	—	—	—		105–115
TNT	—	—	—	—	—	—	—	—	—	—	—	

Legend: Blue = left column team win; Red = top row team win.
Matches with lighter background shading were decided after overtime.

== Fourth seed playoff ==
September 21

Boxscore

Meralco Bolts 104, Mahindra Enforcer 99
Scoring by quarter: 26–29, 15–24, 28–18, 35–28
Pts: Durham 34; Rebs: Durham 7 Asts: Newsome 8	Pts: White 22; Rebs: White 13; Asts: Revilla, White 5

Smart Araneta Coliseum, Quezon City
Referees: S. Pineda, J. Oliva, R. Dacanay, G. Narandan

== Eighth seed playoff ==
September 21

Boxscore

Phoenix Fuel Masters 105, Rain or Shine Elasto Painters 94
Scoring by quarter: 29–16, 25–22, 31–33, 20–23
Pts: Phelps 40; Rebs: W. Wilson 15; Asts: Baguio, Phelps 6	Pts: Dollard 20; Rebs: Dollard 7 Asts: Chan, Lee 3

Smart Araneta Coliseum, Quezon City
Referees: A. Herrera, N. Guevarra, E. Tangkion, M. Flordeliza

== Bracket ==
Quarterfinals (Top 4 twice-to-beat)
1	TNT	136
8	Phoenix	124
4	Meralco	105
5	Mahindra	82
2	San Miguel	114
7	NLEX	110
3	Barangay Ginebra	109
6	Alaska	104

Semifinals (Best-of-5)
1	TNT	1
4	Meralco	3
2	San Miguel	2
3	Barangay Ginebra	3

Finals (Best-of-7)
4	Meralco	2
3	Barangay Ginebra	4

== Quarterfinals ==
=== (1) TNT vs. (8) Phoenix ===
September 24

Boxscore

TNT KaTropa 136, Phoenix Fuel Masters 124
Scoring by quarter: 32–34, 38–33, 37–26, 29–31
Pts: Castro 42; Rebs: Ammons 13; Asts: Rosales 4	Pts: Phelps 39; Rebs: Phelps 17; Asts: Baguio 4
TNT wins series in one game

Ynares Center, Antipolo
Referees: A. Herrera, N. Guevarra, S. Pineda, J. Nicandro

=== (2) San Miguel vs. (7) NLEX ===
September 23

Boxscore

San Miguel Beermen 114, NLEX Road Warriors 110
Scoring by quarter: 24–23, 39–25, 23–34, 28–28
Pts: Millsap 39; Rebs: Fajardo 13; Asts: Fajardo 5	Pts: Walker 45; Rebs: Walker 17; Asts: Taulava 5
San Miguel wins series in one game

Smart Araneta Coliseum, Quezon City
Referees: P. Balao, J. Oliva, M. Montoya, E. Boticario

=== (3) Barangay Ginebra vs. (6) Alaska ===
September 23

Boxscore

Barangay Ginebra San Miguel 109, Alaska Aces 104
Scoring by quarter: 23–23, 30–18, 33–25, 23–38
Pts: Tenorio 32; Rebs: Brownlee 12; Asts: Thompson 9	Pts: Henton 27; Rebs: Henton 15; Asts: Banchero, Jazul 5
Barangay Ginebra wins series in one game

Smart Araneta Coliseum, Quezon City
Referees: E. Tangkion, R. Dacanay, G. Narandan, M. Flordeliza

=== (4) Meralco vs. (5) Mahindra ===
September 24

Boxscore

Meralco Bolts 105, Mahindra Enforcer 82
Scoring by quarter: 18–26, 32–19, 34–16, 21–21
Pts: Durham 24; Rebs: Durham 16; Asts: Durham 6	Pts: White 20; Rebs: White 10; Asts: Bagatsing, Revilla 3
Meralco wins series in one game

Ynares Center, Antipolo
Referees: N. Quilinguen, J. Mariano, J. Marabe, J. Narandan

== Semifinals ==
=== (1) TNT vs. (4) Meralco ===
September 27

Boxscore

TNT KaTropa 113, Meralco Bolts 95
Scoring by quarter: 24–23, 21–20, 39–24, 29–28
Pts: Madanly 22; Rebs: Ammons 11; Asts: Castro 9	Pts: Durham 26; Rebs: Durham 21; Asts: Durham 7

Smart Araneta Coliseum, Quezon City
Referees: P. Balao, M. Montoya, S. Pineda, B. Oliva

September 29

Stats

TNT KaTropa 91, Meralco Bolts 106
Scoring by quarter: 15–29, 25–25, 20–26, 31–26
Pts: Castro 24; Rebs: Ammons, Carey 7 Asts: Castro, de Ocampo 4	Pts: Durham 31; Rebs: Durham 21; Asts: Hugnatan, Newsome 5

Smart Araneta Coliseum, Quezon City
Referees: A. Herrera, P. Balao, J. Marabe, B. Oliva

October 1

Boxscore

TNT KaTropa 113, Meralco Bolts 119
Scoring by quarter: 23–28, 24–22, 37–32, 29–37
Pts: Castro 28; Rebs: Ammons 9 Asts: Castro 10	Pts: Durham 23; Rebs: Durham 13; Asts: Newsome 8

Smart Araneta Coliseum, Quezon City
Referees: N. Quilinguen, J. Mariano, N. Guevarra, M. Montoya

October 3

Boxscore

TNT KaTropa 88, Meralco Bolts 94
Scoring by quarter: 23–18, 21–22, 17–24, 27–30
Pts: Castro 25; Rebs: Ammons 9 Asts: Castro 6	Pts: Hodge 32; Rebs: Durham 16; Asts: Hugnatan, Newsome 4
Meralco wins series, 3–1

Smart Araneta Coliseum, Quezon City
Referees: A. Herrera, E. Tangkion, D. Dacanay, M. Montoya

=== (2) San Miguel vs. (3) Barangay Ginebra ===
September 26

Boxscore

San Miguel Beermen 108, Barangay Ginebra San Miguel 115
Scoring by quarter: 36–24, 21–22, 19–33, 32–36
Pts: Millsap 29; Rebs: Fajardo 15; Asts: Millsap 11	Pts: Brownlee 39; Rebs: Brownlee 16; Asts: Thompson 6

Smart Araneta Coliseum, Quezon City
Referees: A. Herrera, J. Marabe, E. Tangkion, J. Nicandro

September 28

Boxscore

San Miguel Beermen 95, Barangay Ginebra San Miguel 92
Scoring by quarter: 24–18, 27–22, 21–31, 23–21
Pts: Millsap 25; Rebs: Fajardo 23; Asts: Cabagnot 8	Pts: Tenorio 22; Rebs: Brownlee 13; Asts: Tenorio 7

Smart Araneta Coliseum, Quezon City
Referees: N. Quilinguen, N. Guevarra, J. Mariano, E. Boticario

September 30

Boxscore

San Miguel Beermen 96, Barangay Ginebra San Miguel 97
Scoring by quarter: 28–29, 27–22, 22–27, 19–19
Pts: Millsap 24; Rebs: Fajardo, Millsap 12; Asts: Cabagnot 6	Pts: Brownlee 25; Rebs: Thompson 11; Asts: Thompson 10

Smart Araneta Coliseum, Quezon City
Attendance: 14,253
Referees: S. Pineda, R. Dacanay, M. Flordeliza, E. Boticario

October 2

Boxscore

San Miguel Beermen 101, Barangay Ginebra San Miguel 72
Scoring by quarter: 30–22, 25–7, 27–23, 19–20
Pts: Lassiter 25; Rebs: Millsap 17; Asts: Ross 5	Pts: Brownlee 28; Rebs: Cruz 8 Asts: Mercado 5

Smart Araneta Coliseum, Quezon City
Attendance: 22,196
Referees: A. Herrera, P. Balao, J. Mariano, J. Nicandro

October 4

Stats

San Miguel Beermen 92, Barangay Ginebra San Miguel 117
Scoring by quarter: 12–33, 26–12, 15–36, 39–36
Pts: Santos 24; Rebs: Fajardo 12; Asts: Cabagnot 6	Pts: Brownlee 26; Rebs: Thompson 15; Asts: Tenorio 10
Barangay Ginebra wins series, 3–2

Smart Araneta Coliseum, Quezon City
Attendance: 20,374
Referees: N. Guevarra, S. Pineda, M. Flordeliza, J. Narandan

== Finals ==
TV5

October 7
7:00pm

Boxscore

Barangay Ginebra San Miguel 109, Meralco Bolts 114 (OT)

Smart Araneta Coliseum, Quezon City

TV5

October 9
6:30pm

Boxscore

Barangay Ginebra San Miguel 82, Meralco Bolts 79

Smart Araneta Coliseum, Quezon City

TV5

October 12
7:00pm

Boxscore

Barangay Ginebra San Miguel 103, Meralco Bolts 107

Smart Araneta Coliseum, Quezon City

TV5

October 14
8:10pm

Boxscore

Barangay Ginebra San Miguel 88, Meralco Bolts 86

Smart Araneta Coliseum, Quezon City

TV5

October 16
6:30pm

Boxscore

Barangay Ginebra San Miguel 92, Meralco Bolts 81

Smart Araneta Coliseum, Quezon City

TV5

October 19
7:00pm

Boxscore

Barangay Ginebra San Miguel 91, Meralco Bolts 88
Barangay Ginebra wins series, 4–2

Smart Araneta Coliseum, Quezon City

== Imports ==
The following is the list of imports, which had played for their respective teams at least once, with the returning imports in italics. Highlighted in gold are the imports who stayed with their respective teams for the whole conference. Players with an asterisk indicates the Asian imports.

Team	Name	Debuted	Last game	Record
Alaska Aces	(United States) LaDontae Henton	July 17 (vs. Meralco)	September 23 (vs. Ginebra)	6–6
Barangay Ginebra San Miguel	(United States) Paul Harris	July 16 (vs. GlobalPort)	July 16 (vs. GlobalPort)	1–0
Barangay Ginebra San Miguel	(United States) Justin Brownlee	July 24 (vs. Alaska)	October 19 (vs. Meralco)	15–7
Blackwater Elite	(United States) Eric Dawson	July 16 (vs. NLEX)	August 21 (vs. Mahindra)	1–5
Blackwater Elite	No regular import	August 17 (vs. Meralco), August 28 (vs. Alaska)		0–2
Blackwater Elite	(United States) Keala King	September 7 (vs. Phoenix)	September 18 (vs. San Miguel)	0–3
Blackwater Elite	(Palestine) Imad Qahwash*	July 29 (vs. Rain or Shine)	August 28 (vs. Alaska)	0–6
GlobalPort Batang Pier	(United States) Dominique Sutton	July 16 (vs. Ginebra)	July 20 (vs. Mahindra)	0–2
GlobalPort Batang Pier	(United States) Mike Glover	July 24 (vs. Star)	September 14 (vs. Blackwater)	4–5
Mahindra Enforcer	(United States) James White	July 15 (vs. Star)	September 24 (vs. Meralco)	6–7
Mahindra Enforcer	(Iran) Iman Zandi*	July 15 (vs. Star)	August 12 (vs. Phoenix)	4–1
Meralco Bolts	(United States) Allen Durham	July 15 (vs. Phoenix)	October 19 (vs. Ginebra)	13–10
Meralco Bolts	(Iran) Mohammad Jamshidi*	July 15 (vs. Phoenix)	August 10 (vs. Rain or Shine)	3–2
NLEX Road Warriors	(United States) Henry Walker	July 16 (vs. Blackwater)	September 23 (vs. San Miguel)	5–7
NLEX Road Warriors	(Lebanon) Rodrigue Akl*	July 16 (vs. Blackwater)	September 23 (vs. San Miguel)	5–7
Phoenix Fuel Masters	(United States) Marcus Simmons	July 15 (vs. Meralco)	July 23 (vs. Rain or Shine)	0–3
Phoenix Fuel Masters	(United States) Eugene Phelps	July 31 (vs. GlobalPort)	September 24 (vs. TNT)	6–4
Phoenix Fuel Masters	(South Korea) Lee Gwan-hee*	July 15 (vs. Meralco)	September 24 (vs. TNT)	6–7
Rain or Shine Elasto Painters	(United States) Dior Lowhorn	July 20 (vs. TNT)	August 27 (vs. GlobalPort)	3–4
Rain or Shine Elasto Painters	(United States) Jason Forte	September 2 (vs. Mahindra)	September 4 (vs. NLEX)	1–1
Rain or Shine Elasto Painters	(United States) Josh Dollard	September 10 (vs. San Miguel)	September 21 (vs. Phoenix)	1–2
San Miguel Beermen	(United States) Arizona Reid	July 17 (vs. Phoenix)	August 19 (vs. GlobalPort)	4–2
San Miguel Beermen	No regular and Asian import	August 24 (vs. Alaska)		1–0
San Miguel Beermen	(United States) Mike Singletary	August 31 (vs. Meralco)	September 10 (vs. Rain or Shine)	2–1
San Miguel Beermen	(United States) Elijah Millsap	September 18 (vs. Blackwater)	October 4 (vs. Ginebra)	4–3
San Miguel Beermen	(Jordan) Mahmoud Abdeen*	September 3 (vs. TNT)	September 18 (vs. Blackwater)	2–1
Star Hotshots	(United States) Marqus Blakely	July 15 (vs. Mahindra)	July 31 (vs. San Miguel)	1–3
Star Hotshots	(United States) Joel Wright	August 12 (vs. NLEX)	September 16 (vs. Rain or Shine)	1–6
TNT KaTropa	(United States) Mario Little	July 20 (vs. Rain or Shine)	August 3 (vs. NLEX)	4–0
TNT KaTropa	(United States) Mychal Ammons	August 13 (vs. Blackwater)	October 3 (vs. Meralco)	8–4
TNT KaTropa	(Syria) Michael Madanly*	July 20 (vs. Rain or Shine)	October 3 (vs. Meralco)	12–4

=== Import handicapping ===
#	Team	Philippine Cup	Commissioner's Cup	Total	Import height limit
1	San Miguel Beermen	0.6	1.2	1.8	6'5"
2	Alaska Aces	1.2	0.8	2.0	6'5"
3	Rain or Shine Elasto Painters	2.4	0.4	2.8	6'5"
4	Barangay Ginebra San Miguel	3.0	2.0	5.0	6'5"
5	TNT KaTropa	3.6	2.4	6.0	6'5"
6	GlobalPort Batang Pier	1.8	4.8	6.6	6'5"
7	NLEX Road Warriors	4.2	2.8	7.0	6'5"
8	Star Hotshots	5.4	3.2	8.6	6'5"
9	Meralco Bolts	7.2	1.6	8.8	6'9"
10	Barako Bull/Phoenix	4.8	4.4	9.2	6'9"
11	Blackwater Elite	6.0	4.0	10.0	6'9"
12	Mahindra Enforcer	6.6	3.6	10.2	6'9"

- Philippine Cup final ranking comprises 60% of the points, while the elimination round ranking in the Commissioner's Cup is 40%. The four teams with most points gets to have an import of unlimited height.

== Statistics ==
=== Individual statistic leaders ===
Category	Player	Team	Statistic
Points per game	Terrence Romeo	GlobalPort Batang Pier	25.00
Rebounds per game	June Mar Fajardo	San Miguel Beermen	12.88
Assists per game	Jayson Castro	TNT KaTropa	7.44
Steals per game	Chris Ross	San Miguel Beermen	2.00
Blocks per game	Japeth Aguilar	Barangay Ginebra San Miguel	2.30
Turnovers per game	Terrence Romeo	GlobalPort Batang Pier	3.6
Minutes per game	Terrence Romeo	GlobalPort Batang Pier	40.40
FG%	Bradwyn Guinto	Mahindra Enforcer	66.7%
FT%	Aldrech Ramos	Mahindra Enforcer	100.00%
3FG%	Chris Tiu	Rain or Shine Elasto Painters	52.4%
Double-doubles	June Mar Fajardo	San Miguel Beermen	14
Triple-doubles	Scottie Thompson	Barangay Ginebra San Miguel	1

== Awards ==
=== Conference ===
- Best Player of the Conference: Jayson Castro (TNT KaTropa)
- Bobby Parks Best Import of the Conference: Allen Durham (Meralco Bolts)
- Finals MVP: LA Tenorio (Barangay Ginebra San Miguel)

=== Players of the Week ===
Week	Player	Ref.
July 18–24	RR Garcia (Star Hotshots)	
July 25–31	Jayson Castro (TNT KaTropa)	
August 1–7	Keith Agovida (Mahindra Enforcer)	
August 8–14	Anthony Semerad (GlobalPort Batang Pier)	
August 15–21	Stanley Pringle (GlobalPort Batang Pier)	
August 22–28	June Mar Fajardo (San Miguel Beermen)	
August 29–September 4	Jayson Castro (TNT KaTropa)	
September 5–11	Arwind Santos (San Miguel Beermen)	
September 12–18	Jayson Castro (TNT KaTropa)	
September 19–25	Jayson Castro (TNT KaTropa)	
September 26–October 2	Reynel Hugnatan (Meralco Bolts)	
