= Circuito Mexicano de Básquetbol =

CIMEBA
- Founded: 1970
- First season: 1970–71
- Folded: 2007
- Country: Mexico
- Confederation: FIBA Americas (Americas)
- Level on pyramid: 1
- Last champions: Guerreros de Chilpancingo (1st title)
- Most championships: Leñadores de Durango (4)

The Circuito Mexicano de Básquetbol, also known with the acronym CIMEBA, was a professional basketball league in Mexico. The first edition was the 1970–71 season, and it continued until the 2006–07 season, after which the league was discontinued. The league coexisted with the Liga Nacional de Baloncesto Profesional (LNBP) from 2000 to 2007, and with the Circuito de Baloncesto de la Costa del Pacífico (CIBACOPA) from 2001 to 2007.

== History ==
CIMEBA was founded in 1970, with the first season being played between 1970 and 1971. The league held an annual All-Star Game. In November 1999 a selection of CIMEBA players named "CIMEBA All-Stars" toured the United States and played games against NCAA Division I college teams such as Illinois, Michigan State, Minnesota, Ohio, and Purdue.

In the late 1990s and the early 2000s, CIMEBA rules established a maximum number of 3 foreign players per team. In the early 2000s the league also organized another tournament, Conferencia de Básquetbol de Desarrollo CIMEBA (CIMEBA Development Basketball Conference), also known as COBADE, which was played at the same time as CIMEBA.

CIMEBA was the main basketball league in Mexico until the creation of the LNBP (2000) and the CIBACOPA (2001). In the early 2000s the league experienced financial difficulties. Some of the teams left for the LNBP, while others retired at mid-season. The last edition was the 2006–07 season, won by Guerreros de Chilpancingo. The last CIMEBA president was Agustín Villa.

== List of champions ==
Season	Champion
1970–71	Lechugueros de León
1971–72	Santos de San Luis
1972–73	Lechugueros de León
1973	Panteras de Aguascalientes
1974	Panteras de Aguascalientes
1975	Dragones de Tijuana
1979	Leñadores de Durango
1980	Santos de San Luis
1981	Leñadores de Durango
1982	Dorados de Chihuahua
1983	Abejas de Tabasco
1984	Águilas del IMSS
1985	Dorados de Chihuahua
1986	Abejas de Puebla
1987	Abejas de Puebla
1988	Leñadores de Durango
1989	Leones Negros de la UdeG
1990	Dorados de Chihuahua
1990–91	Tecolotes de la UAG
1991–92	Indios de la UACJ
1992–93	Pioneros de Delicias
1993–94	Leñadores de Durango
1994–95	No data available
1995–96	Dorados de Chihuahua
1997–98	Santos de San Luis
1998–99	Correcaminos UAT Tampico
1999–00	Soles de Jalisco
2000–01	Soles de Jalisco
2001–02	Soles de Jalisco
2002–03	Mineros de Zacatecas
2003–04	Jaguares de Chiapas
2006–07	Guerreros de Chilpancingo

== Championships ==
Team	Championships	Year(s) won
Leñadores de Durango	4	1979, 1981, 1988, 1994–95
Dorados de Chihuahua	4	1982, 1985, 1990, 1996
Santos de San Luis	3	1971–72, 1980, 1997–98
Soles de Jalisco	3	1999–00, 2000–01, 2001–02
Lechugueros de León	2	1970–71, 1972–73
Panteras de Aguascalientes	2	1973, 1974
Jaguares de Chiapas	1	2003–04
Abejas de Tabasco	1	1983
Águilas de IMSS	1	1984
Abejas de Puebla	1	1986
Leones Negros de la UdeG	1	1989
Tecolotes de la UAG	1	1990–91
Indios de la UACJ	1	1991–92
Pioneros de Delicias	1	1992–93
Mineros de Zacatecas	1	2002–03
Guerreros de Chilpancingo	1	2006–07

== See also ==
- LNB
- CIBACOPA
