= Jefes de Fuerza Lagunera =

- Leagues: LNBP
- Founded: 2014
- Dissolved: 2016
- Arena: Auditorio Municipal de Torreón
- Capacity: 4,363
- Location: Torreón, Coahuila
- President: José Ganem A.
- Head coach: TBD
- Website: Official site
Home	Away	Third

The Jefes de Fuerza Lagunera is a Mexican professional basketball team based in Torreón, Coahuila, Mexico. The team is a member of the Liga Nacional de Baloncesto Profesional (LNBP). The team was founded in 2014 and plays their home games in the Auditorio Municipal de Torreón.

== Franchise history ==
In their initial season (2014–15), the Jefes went 20–20 in the regular season and finished tied for 6th place under head coach Daniel Jaule. The team also had two players selected for the All-Star game: Rayes Gallegos and Jordan Glynn. With the 7th-place finish the Jefes qualified for the playoffs and lost to the Pioneros in the quarterfinals 4–1.

For their second season the Jefes had Francisco Olmos Hernández as head coach. The team opened the season 17–16 and were making a playoff push until they were forced to forfeit their last 6 games due to not meeting roster regulations because of player suspensions. The suspensions were due to an on-court fight against players from rival Correcaminos. After the suspensions and the ruling of game forfeitures by the league, head coach Olmos resigned and went on to coach the Atenienses de Manatí, of Puerto Rico's National Superior Basketball (BSN) league. Assistant coach Pedro Carrillo took over as interim head coach and the team ended the season at 17–22, last in the league.

== Season-by-season results ==
Jefes de Fuerza Lagunera
Season	Head coach	Regular Season	Standing	Playoffs
2014–15	Daniel Jaule (Argentina)	20–20	7th	Lost Quarterfinals to Pioneros, 1–4
2015–16	Francisco Olmos Hernández; Pedro Carrillo (last 6 games)	17–22	11th	DNQ

== Current roster ==
Note: Flags indicate national team eligibility at FIBA-sanctioned events. Players may hold other non-FIBA nationalities not displayed.

Jefes de Fuerza Lagunera roster
Players
Coaches

Pos.	No.	Nat.	Name	Ht.	Wt.	Age
SG	1	(Mexico)	Jenkins Sánchez, Tomás	1.90 m (6 ft 3 in)	84 kg (185 lb)
SG	2	(United States)	Pinson, Mychal	1.83 m (6 ft 0 in)	84 kg (185 lb)
F	3	(Panama)	Ayarza, Josimar	2.05 m (6 ft 9 in)	102 kg (225 lb)	38 – 3 May 1987
C	4	(Mexico)	Carrillo, Hugo	2.05 m (6 ft 9 in)	110 kg (243 lb)	42 – 11 December 1983
SF	5	(United States)	Cannon, Jalen	1.98 m (6 ft 6 in)	102 kg (225 lb)	32 – 5 May 1993
PG	10	(Puerto Rico)	Pagán Roque, Wilfredo (C)	1.84 m (6 ft 0 in)	84 kg (185 lb)	49 – 22 February 1976
SF	11	(Mexico)	Ávalos, Irvin	2.01 m (6 ft 7 in)	93 kg (205 lb)
PF	13	(United States)	Gwynne, Matthew	2.08 m (6 ft 10 in)	114 kg (251 lb)	38 – 29 April 1987
SG	15	(Mexico)	Gallegos, Rayes	1.88 m (6 ft 2 in)	82 kg (181 lb)	35 – 15 November 1990
PF	17	(Mexico)	Esteva, Juan	1.96 m (6 ft 5 in)	98 kg (216 lb)	43 – 13 February 1983
F/C	18	(United States)	McGhee, Aaron	2.03 m (6 ft 8 in)	121 kg (267 lb)	46 – 28 June 1979
PG	20	(Mexico)	Malpica, Karim	1.90 m (6 ft 3 in)	80 kg (176 lb)	47 – 24 August 1978
G	35	(United States)	Joseph, Andrew	1.90 m (6 ft 3 in)	77 kg (170 lb)
SG	44	(Puerto Rico)	Mojica, Javier	1.90 m (6 ft 3 in)	82 kg (181 lb)	41 – 31 August 1984
SF	55	(Puerto Rico)	Gierbolini, Joel	2.03 m (6 ft 8 in)	109 kg (240 lb)	36 – 19 November 1989

Head coach

- Francisco Olmos Hernández (Spain)

Assistant coach(es)

- Pedro Carrillo Ballesteros (Spain)

Legend

- (C) Team captain
- Injured

- Roster
Updated: December 1, 2015

== See also ==
- Liga Nacional de Baloncesto Profesional
- FIBA Americas League
