= North Salem High School (Salem, Oregon) =

Public school in Salem, Oregon, United States

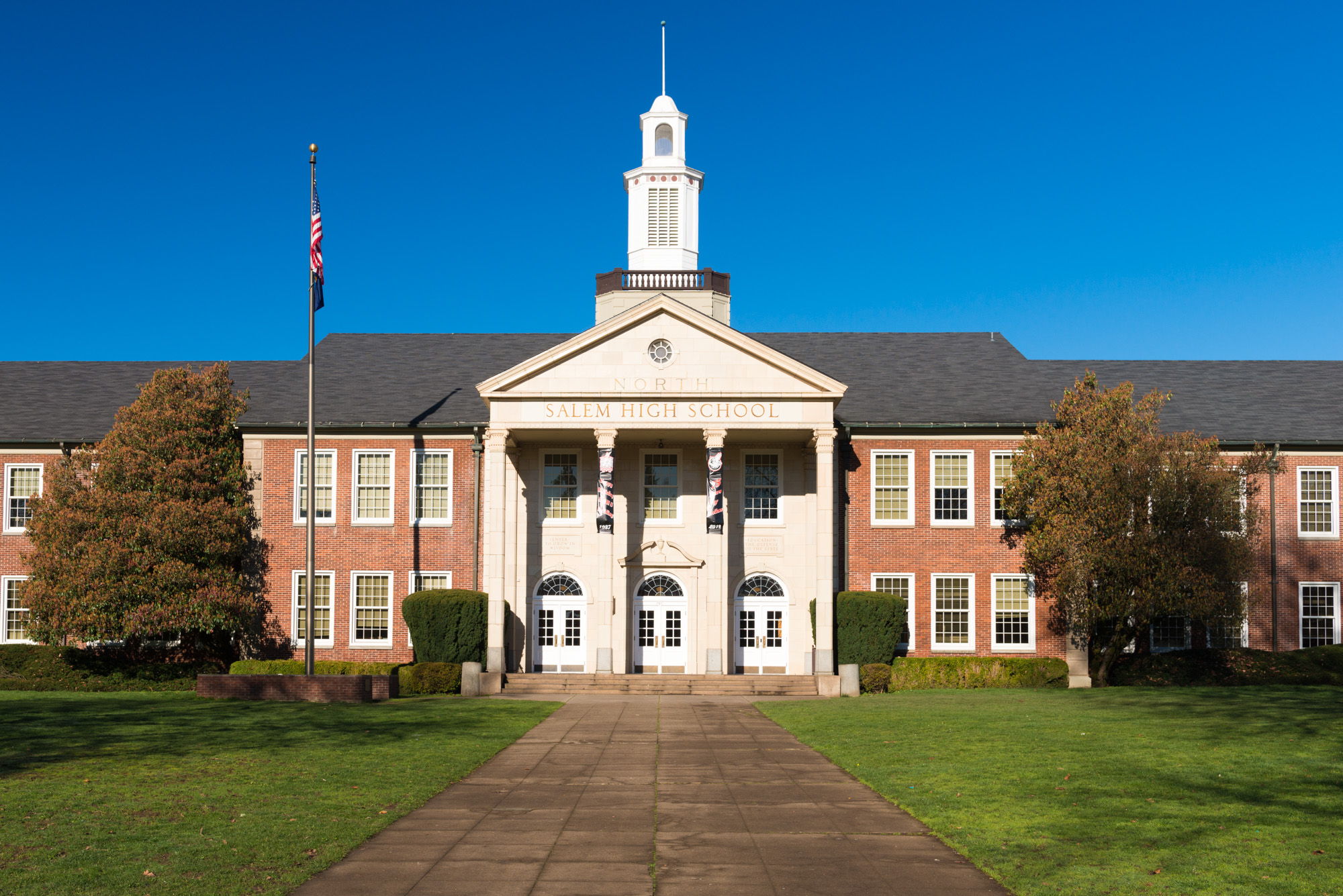

Location
- 765 14th St NE; Salem, (Marion County), Oregon 97301; United States; 44.944541°N 123.021026°W

Information
- Type: Public
- Opened: 1906
- School district: Salem-Keizer School District
- Principal: Dustin Purnell
- Staff: 106.71 (FTE)
- Enrollment: 2,176 (2023–2024)
- Student to teacher ratio: 20.39
- Colors: Red and black
- Athletics conference: OSAA Central Valley Conference 6A-6
- Mascot: Viking
- Rival: South Salem High School
- Feeder schools: Houck Middle School, Parrish Middle School, Waldo Middle School
- Website: north.salkeiz.k12.or.us

North Salem High School (NSHS, originally Salem High School) is a public high school in Salem, Oregon, United States, founded in 1906. It was known as Salem High School until 1954.

== History ==
Opened in 1906, the original Salem High School building was at the location of the former Meier & Frank building in downtown Salem (most recently a Macy's). A decision was made to move the school to a more spacious building, and in 1937, the new Salem High School building was opened on the corner of 14th and D street. The new building was a project of the Public Works Administration, and at the time of its founding was on the fringes of developed Salem. The school's name was changed in 1954 to North Salem High School when South Salem High School opened that year. Over the years, many additions have been made to the building, with the latest addition, the West Wing, being completed in 2001. In 2019, North Salem High School began construction on new gyms and classrooms, before being complete in 2021.

== Demographics ==
Demographics For North Salem High School

- 63.8% Hispanic Enrollment
- 22.2% White Enrollment
- 4.6% Two or More Races Enrollment
- 4.3% Native Hawaiian/Pacific Islander Enrollment
- 2.2% Black Enrollment
- 1.6% Asian Enrollment
- 0.8% American Indian/Alaska Native enrollment

== Academics ==
Like many Marion County schools, North Salem High School has historically had a high dropout rate, regularly exceeding the state average. During the 2001–02 school year, the dropout rate stood at 29.83%. This, however, has been improving steadily since 1997, when the dropout rate was 39.90%.

In 2024, 82% of the school's seniors received a high school diploma. Of 572 students, 554 graduated and 82 dropped out. North Salem's test scores are below state averages, although they have been improving slowly. In 2023-24, North Salem finished with 23% meeting English standards, 13% in Math, and 17% in Science, all of which are below the state average in each respective category.

== Music ==
North Salem has been nationally recognized by the GRAMMY Foundation as a "Grammy Signature School" multiple times.

In 2003, the Marching Band won the Northwest Marching Band Circuit, taking their number one ranking among Washington, Oregon, Southern Idaho, Northern California, and Western Nevada marching bands. In 2005, the band tied with South Salem High School to win the OSAA 4A State Band Championship.

== State championships ==
- Boys' cross country: 1949, 1952, 1953
- Boys' basketball: 1920, 1925, 1926, 1933, 1939, 1940, 1950
- Baseball: 1967
- Boys' golf: 1953
- Boys' tennis: 1953
- Boys' track & field: 1927
- Girls' Track & Field: 1997, 2019
- Football: 1963

== Notable alumni ==
- Staryl C. Austin, U.S. Air Force general
- Lute Barnes, former MLB player for New York Mets
- Rocky Gale, Major League Baseball player, San Diego Padres
- Amory "Slats" Gill (1901–1966), basketball coach at Oregon State University
- Edith Starrett Green, United States Representative 1955–74
- Elizabeth Halseth, Nevada state senator
- Avry Holmes, basketball player
- Mark Hatfield, Governor of Oregon 1959–67, U.S. Senator 1967–97
- Frank Herbert, author of Dune
- Jed Lowrie (born 1984), Major League Baseball player, Oakland Athletics
- Leonard Stone (born Leonard Steinbock), actor

==
