= Lobos de Puebla =

- League: Liga Nacional de Baloncesto Profesional
- Founded: 2004; 22 years ago
- History: Lobos Plateados de la BUAP; 2004–2025; Lobos de Puebla; 2026–present
- Arena: Gimnasio Miguel Hidalgo
- Capacity: 4,000
- Location: Puebla City, Puebla, Mexico
- Team colors: Forest green, sage, silver and white
- President: Ángel Fernando Morales Blanchet
- Head coach: Paco Olmos
- Ownership: Promoción Deportiva y Cultural AC
Home	Away

Lobos de Puebla (English: Puebla Wolves) are a Mexican professional basketball team based in Puebla City, Puebla. The Lobos are members of the Liga Nacional de Baloncesto Profesional (LNBP) and play their games in the Gimnasio Miguel Hidalgo.

== History ==
The team was founded in 2004, they only played one season before being dissolved. On 11 June 2024, the team was presented at a press conference as an expansion team in the Liga Nacional de Baloncesto Profesional (LNBP), with Giovanni Martínez serving as team president. It was also announced by Lilia Cedillo Ramírez, the rector of the BUAP, that the Lobos Plateados would be playing at the Arena BUAP. They would also be the first professional basketball team to play in the state since the Ángeles de Puebla in 2019.

Lobos Plateados hired Puerto Rican coach Allans Colón as the team's inaugural head coach in late June, but was replaced by Claudio Arrigoni at the beginning of September due to poor results.

== Players ==
=== Current roster ===
Note: Flags indicate national team eligibility at FIBA-sanctioned events. Players may hold other non-FIBA nationalities not displayed.

Lobos de Puebla roster
Players
Coaches

Pos.	No.	Nat.	Name	Ht.	Wt.
SF	2	(United States)	King, Elias	2.02 m (6 ft 8 in)	100 kg (220 lb)
PG	3	(Mexico)	Willis, Diego	1.93 m (6 ft 4 in)	82 kg (181 lb)
PG	6	(Panama)	Luzcando, Eugenio	1.90 m (6 ft 3 in)	90 kg (198 lb)
SG	8	(Mexico)	Rodriguez, Karim	1.96 m (6 ft 5 in)	90 kg (198 lb)
PG	9	(Mexico)	Montano, Iván	1.80 m (5 ft 11 in)	77 kg (170 lb)
PG	10	(Mexico)	Ramírez, Víctor	1.80 m (5 ft 11 in)	80 kg (176 lb)
PG	11	(Senegal)	Hannah, Clevin	1.70 m (5 ft 7 in)	71 kg (157 lb)
PF	15	(Mexico)	Camacho, Jorge	2.01 m (6 ft 7 in)	93 kg (205 lb)
SF	21	(United States)	Williams, Cecil	1.98 m (6 ft 6 in)	88 kg (194 lb)
SG	22	(United States)	Johnson, Shaquille	1.90 m (6 ft 3 in)	90 kg (198 lb)
PF	23	(Jamaica)	De Lattibeaudiere, Tyran	2.02 m (6 ft 8 in)	102 kg (225 lb)
PF	24	(United States)	Myers, Mike	2.06 m (6 ft 9 in)	108 kg (238 lb)
C	25	(Mexico)	Gutiérrez, Israel	2.08 m (6 ft 10 in)	113 kg (249 lb)
PG	32	(United States)	Cotton, Tekele	1.88 m (6 ft 2 in)	92 kg (203 lb)
PG	33	(United States)	Washington, Eric	1.83 m (6 ft 0 in)	82 kg (181 lb)
PF	41	(United States)	Jefferson, Davon	2.03 m (6 ft 8 in)	102 kg (225 lb)

Head coach

- (Spain) Paco Olmos

Assistant coach(es)

- (Spain) Tino Ugidos
- (Spain) Jordi Guàrdia

Legend

- (C) Team captain
- Injured

- Roster
Updated: December 7, 2019

=== Notable players ===
Note: Flags indicate national team eligibility at FIBA-sanctioned events. Players may hold other non-FIBA nationalities not displayed.

Criteria

To appear in this section a player must have either:

- Set a club record or won an individual award while at the club
- Played at least one official international match for their national team at any time
- Played at least one official NBA match at any time.

- (Mexico) Fernando Benítez
- (Democratic Republic of the Congo) Christian Eyenga
- (United States) John Fields
- (United States) Julian Gamble
- (United States) Daniel Hamilton
- (United States) Justin Keenan
