= Auditorio Municipal de Torreón =

Arena in Coahuila, Mexico

- Interactive map of Auditorio Municipal de Torreón
- Location: Torreón, Mexico
- Coordinates: 25.5337°N 103.4481°W
- Owner: City of Torreón
- Capacity: 4,363

Construction
- Opened: 1969
- Renovated: 2012

Tenants
- Toros Laguna (CIBACOPA) (2018–present); Laguneros de La Comarca (LNBP) (2018–2020); Jefes de Fuerza Lagunera (LNBP) (2014–2016); Algodoneros de la Comarca (LNBP) (2000–2011)

The Auditorio Municipal de Torreón is an arena in Torreón, Coahuila, Mexico. The arena was opened on 1969. The arena is the home venue of the Toros Laguna of the CIBACOPA.
