= Gimnasio Miguel Hidalgo =

Arena in Puebla, Mexico

Coordinates: 19°4′31″N 98°9′44″W

- Gimnasio Miguel Hidalgo
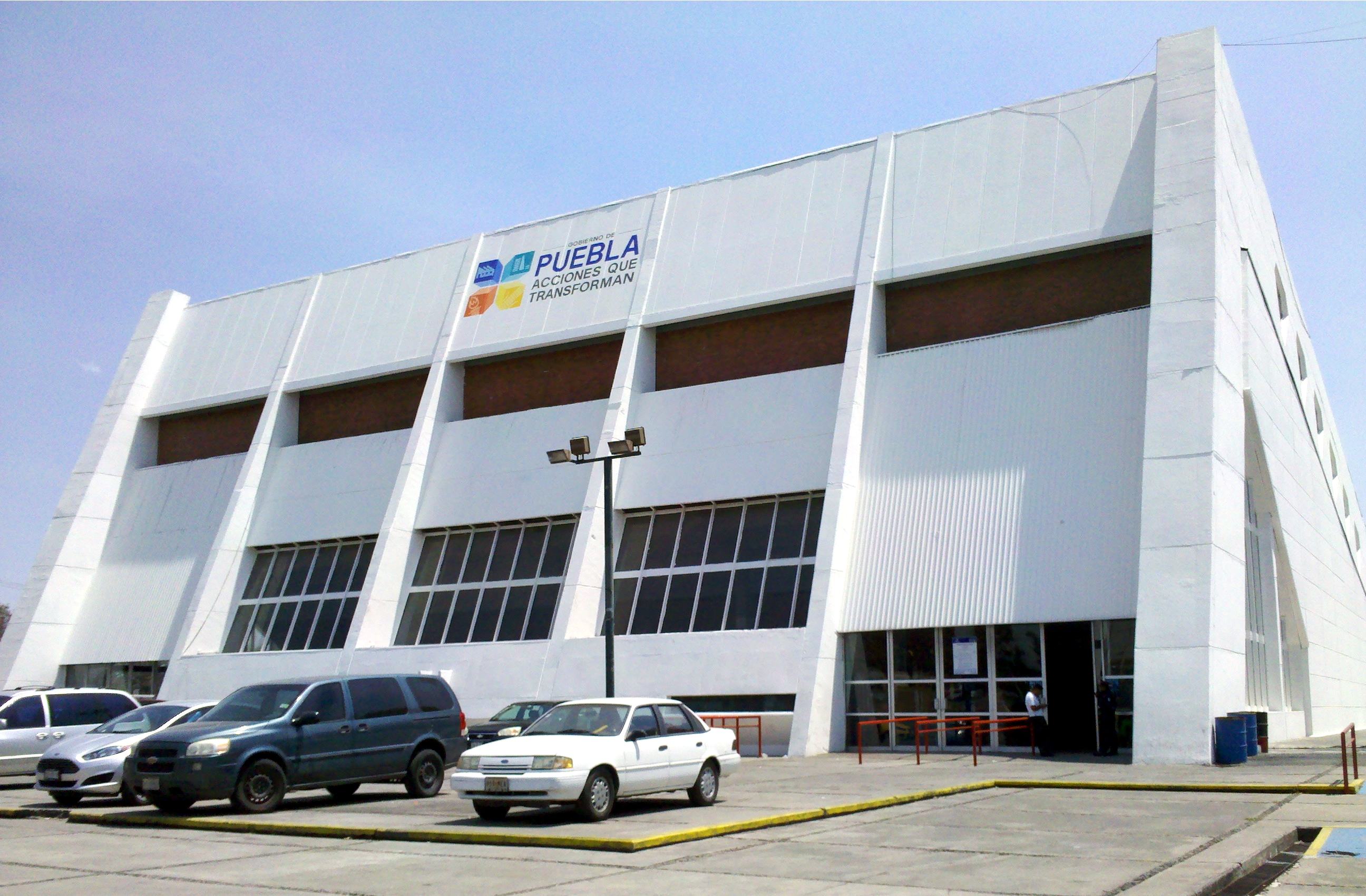
- Interactive map of Gimnasio Miguel Hidalgo
- Address: Puebla; Mexico
- Capacity: 4,000
- Type: Arena
- Events: Sporting events Concerts

Construction
- Built: 1974
- Renovated: 2008

Tenants
- Ángeles de Puebla (LNBP) (2007–2020); Lobos de Puebla (LNBP) (2026–)

Gimnasio Miguel Hidalgo is a 4,000-seat indoor arena located in the city of Puebla, Mexico. Built in 1974, it is part of a sports complex that also includes Estadios Cuauhtémoc and Hermanos Serdán. The arena, which is the home to the Angeles de Puebla basketball team, was the largest indoor performance venue in the city until the completion of much larger Centro Cultural Siglo XXI.

In addition to basketball, the Gimnasio is used for boxing, lucha libre, and other sporting events and for occasional concerts. It is the largest indoor venue to be named in memory of Miguel Hidalgo. The Gimnasio underwent a $12 million peso renovation in 2008 that included a state-of-the-art lighting system, refurbished restrooms, and a refurbished office.
