= Ángeles de Puebla (basketball) =

- Leagues: LNBP
- Founded: 2007
- Dissolved: 2020
- Arena: Gimnasio Miguel Hidalgo
- Capacity: 4,000
- Location: Puebla, Mexico
- Team colors: Blue and White
- President: Luis Ontañón León
- Head coach: Israel Zermeño
- Website: Official site
Home	Away

Ángeles de Puebla (English: Puebla Angels) was a Mexican professional basketball team based in Puebla, Mexico that played in the Liga Nacional de Baloncesto Profesional (LNBP). The team played their home games in the Gimnasio Miguel Hidalgo.

== Franchise history ==
The Ángeles were founded in 2007 by Luis Ontañón León, a local business man who has been in charge of the club since then. The club's original colors were red and white, these were later changed to blue and white.

== Players ==
=== Current roster ===
Note: Flags indicate national team eligibility at FIBA-sanctioned events. Players may hold other non-FIBA nationalities not displayed.

Ángeles de Puebla roster
Players
Coaches

Pos.	No.	Nat.	Name	Ht.	Wt.
F	3	(Panama)	Grant, Alejandro	1.98 m (6 ft 6 in)	78 kg (172 lb)
F	6	(Mexico)	Rivera, Roberto	1.95 m (6 ft 5 in)	90 kg (198 lb)
F	7	(Mexico)	Yáñez, Manuel	1.94 m (6 ft 4 in)	87 kg (192 lb)
F	10	(United States)	Green, William	2.01 m (6 ft 7 in)	98 kg (216 lb)
F	16	(Puerto Rico)	Burgos, Jeffrey	1.95 m (6 ft 5 in)	103 kg (227 lb)
G	28	(Mexico)	Ybarra, Julio	1.80 m (5 ft 11 in)	85 kg (187 lb)
C	32	(United States)	Elliott, Travis	2.03 m (6 ft 8 in)	115 kg (254 lb)
G	41	(United States)	Rice, G'Mitri	1.90 m (6 ft 3 in)	90 kg (198 lb)
G	77	(Mexico)	Hernández, Nassary	1.75 m (5 ft 9 in)	80 kg (176 lb)

Head coach

- (Mexico) Israel Zermeño

Assistant coach(es)

- (Mexico) Ulises Roldán

Legend

- (C) Team captain
- Injured

- Roster
Updated: October 14, 2020

== See also ==
- Liga Nacional de Baloncesto Profesional
- FIBA Americas League
