= Toros Laguna =

- Nickname: "The Bulls"
- League: CIBACOPA
- Founded: 2018; 8 years ago
- History: Industriales de la Laguna; 2018–2021; Toros de Torreón; 2021; Toros Laguna; 2022–present
- Arena: Auditorio Municipal de Torreón
- Capacity: 4,363
- Location: Torreón, Mexico
- Team colors: Red, Black, and White
- President: Axdruval Ávila Elizalde
- Head coach: Vacant
Home	Away

Toros Laguna (English: Laguna Bulls) are a Mexican professional basketball team based in Torreón, Coahuila. The Toros Laguna are members of the CIBACOPA and play their games in the Auditorio Municipal de Torreón.

== History ==
In 2018, they began their history as a franchise under the name Industriales de la Laguna, competing in the Liga de Básquetbol Estatal de Chihuahua. They initially played in Gómez Palacio at the Gimnasio Auditorio Centenario, but later moved to Torreón to the Auditorio Municipal de Torreón for a period of time. For the 2021 season, they changed their name to Toros de Torreón. Toros Laguna is the name of the franchise that was created starting in 2022 and participated in the 2023 season of the Liga de Básquetbol Estatal de Chihuahua, becoming part of a new era in the history of professional basketball in La Laguna. In 2023 Facundo Murías signed as head coach of the team. After seven years playing in the Liga de Básquetbol Estatal de Chihuahua, where they won a championship in 2023, the management of the La Laguna team took a new direction by joining the CIBACOPA for the 2026 season.

== Players ==
=== Current roster ===
Note: Flags indicate national team eligibility at FIBA-sanctioned events. Players may hold other non-FIBA nationalities not displayed.

Toros Laguna roster
Players
Coaches

Pos.	No.	Nat.	Name	Ht.	Wt.
SG	2	(United States)	Bejarano, Daniel	1.92 m (6 ft 4 in)	95 kg (209 lb)
SF	3	(Mexico)	Girón, Eddie	1.96 m (6 ft 5 in)	86 kg (190 lb)
SG	4	(Mexico)	Andriassi, Josué	1.85 m (6 ft 1 in)	86 kg (190 lb)
SF	7	(United States)	Glynn, Jordan	2.01 m (6 ft 7 in)	105 kg (231 lb)
PG	12	(United States)	Holmes, Avry	1.88 m (6 ft 2 in)	79 kg (174 lb)
PG	16	(Mexico)	Montano, Iván	1.80 m (5 ft 11 in)	77 kg (170 lb)
SF	21	(United States)	Soto, Daniel	1.96 m (6 ft 5 in)	96 kg (212 lb)
SF	22	(United States)	Washington, Jy'lan	2.05 m (6 ft 9 in)	103 kg (227 lb)
SF	24	(Mexico)	Girón, Gabriel	1.93 m (6 ft 4 in)	95 kg (209 lb)
PF	35	(United States)	Barber, Raven	2.06 m (6 ft 9 in)	107 kg (236 lb)
C	41	(United States)	Devaughn, Gerard	2.06 m (6 ft 9 in)	110 kg (243 lb)
SF	99	(United States)	Hellems, Jericole	2.01 m (6 ft 7 in)	93 kg (205 lb)

Head coach

- Vacant

Assistant coach(es)

- (Argentina) Tadeo Traglia
- (Mexico) Ulises Roldán

Legend

- (C) Team captain
- (I) Import player
- Injured

- Roster
