= Paco Olmos =

Spanish basketball coach

Lobos de Puebla
- Position: Head coach
- League: LNBP

Personal information
- Born: July 10, 1970 (age 56) Valencia, Spain
- Coaching career: 1997–present

Career history

Coaching
- 1997–1999: CB Calpe
- 1999–2000: Bàsquet Inca
- 2000–2001: CB Ciudad de Huelva
- 2001–2002: CB Villa de Los Barrios
- 2002–2004: Valencia BC
- 2005–2006: CB Calpe
- 2006–2009: Club Melilla Baloncesto
- 2009–2011: Menorca Bàsquet
- 2011–2012: Valencia BC
- 2013–2015: Cangrejeros de Santurce
- 2013–2014: Puerto Rico
- 2015–2016: Atenienses de Manatí
- 2016: Vaqueros de Bayamón
- 2016–2021: Fuerza Regia
- 2021–2022: Breogán
- 2022: San Pablo Burgos
- 2024–2025: Halcones de Xalapa
- 2025: Prishtina
- 2026: Golden Eagle Ylli
- 2026–present: Lobos de Puebla

Career highlights
- AEEB Spanish Coach of the Year (2003)

Francisco Olmos Hernández (born July 10, 1970), usually known as Paco Olmos, is a Spanish professional basketball coach, currently the head coach of Golden Eagle Ylli in the Kosovo Basketball Superleague.

== Coaching career ==
Olmos coached inferior teams of Valencia BC until 1997, when he signed for CB Calpe of the EBA League. In 1999 he made his debut in the second Spanish division LEB League with CB Inca; in the following year he continued in the same division, signing for CB Ciudad de Huelva (2000–01) and for CB Los Barrios (2001–2002).

After that, Olmos signed for Pamesa Valencia of ACB League, where he stayed during two years and achieved the best results of the club history: finalist of the 2002–2003 ACB League and 2002–03 ULEB Cup champions.

In June 2005 he became the coach of the Spain national under-20 basketball team. Then he return to the LEB again, first coaching Aguas de Calpe (2005–2006), then Club Melilla Baloncesto (2006–2008) and afterwards, in July 2009, he became head coach of Menorca Basquet, reaching the second position in the regular league and winning the 2010 LEB Playoff, thus promoting the team to the ACB League.

On July 18, 2013 was named national coach of the Puerto Rico Men's National Basketball Team to form the template that will participate in the qualifying tournament "Pre-World" FIBA to be held in Caracas, Venezuela from August 30, 2013.

In 2016, Olmos signs with Vaqueros de Bayamón.

After ending the season with the Venezuelan squad, he signed for Mexican Fuerza Regia. In his first season at the helm of the squad from Monterrey, Olmos ended as champion of the National League.

On January 10, 2022, he has signed with San Pablo Burgos of the Liga ACB.

In January, 2026, he was named head coach of Kosovo Basketball Superleague team Ylli.

== Titles & awards ==
=== Titles ===
- National competitions:
    - 1 LNBP with Fuerza Regia: 2016–17

- 1 LEB Playoffs and promotion with Menorca Basquet: 2009–10.

- International competitions:

- 1 ULEB Cup with Pamesa Valencia : 2002–03.
- 1 Liga Unike With Golden Eagle Ylli : 2025-26

=== Awards ===
- AEEB Coach of the Year: 2002–03.
