= Leñadores de Durango =

- Conference: East
- League: LNBP
- Founded: 1979
- Dissolved: 2022
- History: Leñadores de Durango (1979–2022)
- Arena: Auditorio del Pueblo
- Capacity: 3,500
- Location: Durango City, Durango, Mexico
- Team colors: Navy blue, white, red, gold
- Head coach: Sebastián Sucarrat
- Championships: 4 CIMEBA
Home	Away

Leñadores de Durango (English: Durango Lumberjacks) is a professional Mexican basketball team, based in Durango City. The Leñadores are part Liga Nacional de Baloncesto Profesional, the top professional basketball league in Mexico. The team play their home games at the Auditorio del Pueblo, with a capacity of 3,500 spectators.

The team was founded in 1979 and started playing at the now defunct Circuito Mexicano de Básquetbol till 1998, winning four championships. From 2002 to 2004, the Leñadores participated in the newly established Liga Nacional de Baloncesto Profesional. After an absence of more than ten years, Durango returned to professional basketball for the 2018–19 season.

== History ==
The Leñadores were founded in 1979 by Duranguense businessmen who wanted to bring professional basketball to the Mexican state of Durango. Initially, the nickname Alacranes was proposed, due to scorpions being the most notable animal from Durango, nevertheless, ultimately, after a poll, the name Leñadores was chosen.

The team played in the Circuito Mexicano de Básquetbol, the top level of Mexican basketball in those years, from its establishment in 1979 till 1998, winning four titles in 1979, 1981, 1984 and 1994.

In 2002, Leñadores joined Liga Nacional de Baloncesto Profesional, where they played for only three seasons. The team was disbanded after the 2004 season. Previously, the franchise intended to withdraw after the 2003 season, but it stayed for one more season after securing several sponsorship agreements.

In 2018, it was announced that Leñadores would return to professional basketball after 13 years of absence.

The team has always played at the Auditorio del Pueblo as their home arena.

== Players ==
=== Current roster ===
Note: Flags indicate national team eligibility at FIBA-sanctioned events. Players may hold other non-FIBA nationalities not displayed.

Leñadores de Durango roster
Players
Coaches

Pos.	No.	Nat.	Name	Ht.	Wt.
F	0	(Dominican Republic)	Peña, Antonio	2.04 m (6 ft 8 in)	104 kg (229 lb)
G/F	1	(Mexico)	Herrera, Eder	1.95 m (6 ft 5 in)	88 kg (194 lb)
F	2	(Mexico)	Sáenz, Marco	1.99 m (6 ft 6 in)	100 kg (220 lb)
G	2	(Mexico)	Smith, Michael	1.90 m (6 ft 3 in)	97 kg (214 lb)
G	8	(Argentina)	Machuca, Jonathan	1.84 m (6 ft 0 in)	85 kg (187 lb)
G	10	(Mexico)	Matrón, Alan	1.89 m (6 ft 2 in)	91 kg (201 lb)
G	11	(Mexico)	Álvarez, James	1.80 m (5 ft 11 in)	81 kg (179 lb)
F	13	(Mexico)	Davis, Leroy	1.99 m (6 ft 6 in)	104 kg (229 lb)
G/F	21	(Mexico)	Garay, Santiago	1.95 m (6 ft 5 in)	93 kg (205 lb)
F	23	(Mexico)	Richards, Omar	2.03 m (6 ft 8 in)	103 kg (227 lb)
G	24	(Mexico)	Girón, Gabriel	1.92 m (6 ft 4 in)	96 kg (212 lb)
G/F	30	(Argentina)	Ruíz, Enzo	1.94 m (6 ft 4 in)	103 kg (227 lb)
C	31	(Argentina)	Basualdo, Iván	2.03 m (6 ft 8 in)	102 kg (225 lb)

Head coach

- (Argentina) Sebastián Sucarrat

Assistant coach(es)

- (Argentina) Manuel Urrutia

Legend

- (C) Team captain
- Injured

- Roster
Updated: October 14, 2020

== Honours ==
=== Domestic competitions ===
- Circuito Mexicano de Básquetbol

Winners (4): 1979, 1981, 1984, 1994
