= Soles de Mexicali =

- League: LNBP
- Founded: 2005
- History: Soles de Mexicali; 2005–present
- Arena: Auditorio PSF
- Capacity: 4,779
- Location: Mexicali, Baja California, Mexico
- Team colors: Orange, black and white
- President: Carlos Cota Arce
- Head coach: Pablo García
- Championships: 4 (2006, 2015, 2018, 2020)
- Website: solesmexicali.com
Home	Away

The Soles de Mexicali (English: Mexicali Suns) is a Mexican professional basketball team based in Mexicali, Baja California, Mexico, playing in the Northern Division of the Liga Nacional de Baloncesto Profesional (LNBP). The team was founded in 2005, and has established as one of Mexico's most successful basketball franchises. They currently play their home games in the Auditorio del Estado and are getting their home auditorium remodeled to match their recent title.

After only two years of existence, the team won their first national championship against the Halcones de Xalapa.

== International tournaments ==
The Soles have represented Mexico in some renowned and important international basketball competitions in such as the Harlem Week Basketball in the Netherlands.

On December 4, 2007, Soles de Mexicali was one of the 16 teams to participate in the first annual FIBA Americas League in Mexicali, Baja California, Mexico that ended on February 9, 2008. The Soles gave an impressive performance ending in second place while Argentina's Peñarol Mar del Plata came in first.

== 2008-2009 season ==
They defeated Lobos Universidad de Coahuila (U. de C.) to advance to the Final Eight.

In the Final Eight they defeated Dorados de Chihuahua in 6 games to advance to the Zona Norte Finals (Final Four).

On February 23, 2009, they will play Tecos de U.A. de G. in the Zona Norte Final, they will need win 4 of 7 games.

== Honors ==
=== Domestic ===
- Liga Nacional de Baloncesto Profesional:
  - Winner (4): 2006, 2015, 2018, 2020
    - Runner-up (3): 2008, 2016, 2017
    - Zona Norte Finals (1): 2009 (Final Four)

=== International ===
- FIBA Americas League:
  - Runner-up (1): 2008

== Players ==
=== Current roster ===
Note: Flags indicate national team eligibility at FIBA-sanctioned events. Players may hold other non-FIBA nationalities not displayed.

Soles de Mexicali roster
Players
Coaches

Pos.	No.	Nat.	Name	Ht.	Wt.
PF	0	(Puerto Rico)	Piñeiro, Isaiah	2.01 m (6 ft 7 in)	100 kg (220 lb)
G/F	1	(Brazil)	Pereira, Guilherme	1.91 m (6 ft 3 in)	90 kg (198 lb)
SF	2	(Mexico)	Girón, Eddie	1.96 m (6 ft 5 in)	86 kg (190 lb)
PF	3	(United States)	Zinaich, Connor	1.98 m (6 ft 6 in)	100 kg (220 lb)
SF	4	(Argentina)	Thomas, Erik	1.96 m (6 ft 5 in)	98 kg (216 lb)
PG	5	(United States)	Hunter, Kaleb	1.92 m (6 ft 4 in)	93 kg (205 lb)
PF	6	(Mexico)	Martínez, Brayan	2.05 m (6 ft 9 in)	110 kg (243 lb)
PG	7	(Mexico)	Contreras, Juan	1.88 m (6 ft 2 in)	88 kg (194 lb)
C	8	(Serbia)	Apić, Dragan	2.06 m (6 ft 9 in)	105 kg (231 lb)
SG	11	(United States)	Webster, Joshua	1.90 m (6 ft 3 in)	91 kg (201 lb)
PG	16	(Mexico)	Mendoza, Eduardo	1.90 m (6 ft 3 in)	90 kg (198 lb)
C	18	(Democratic Republic of the Congo)	Sakho, Jordan	2.07 m (6 ft 9 in)	105 kg (231 lb)
SG	23	(Canada)	Scrubb, Philip	1.94 m (6 ft 4 in)	84 kg (185 lb)
G	24	(United States)	Thomasson, Joe	1.93 m (6 ft 4 in)	75 kg (165 lb)
PG	44	(United States)	Campbell, Terrance	1.75 m (5 ft 9 in)	86 kg (190 lb)

Head coach

- (Spain) Pablo García

Assistant coach(es)

- (Spain) Carlos Alonso

Legend

- (C) Team captain
- (I) Import player
- Injured

- Roster
Updated: 10 November 2026

=== Depth chart ===
Pos.	Starting 5	Bench 1	Bench 2
C	Jordan Sakho	Dragan Apić	Brayan Martínez
PF	Erik Thomas	Isaiah Piñeiro	Eddie Girón
SF	Philip Scrubb	Connor Zinaich	Guilherme Pereira
SG	Joe Thomasson	Joshua Webster	Kaleb Hunter
PG	Terrance Campbell	Juan Contreras	Eduardo Mendoza

=== Notable players ===
Note: Flags indicate national team eligibility at FIBA-sanctioned events. Players may hold other non-FIBA nationalities not displayed.

Criteria

To appear in this section a player must have either:

- Set a club record or won an individual award while at the club
- Played at least one official international match for their national team at any time
- Played at least one official NBA match at any time.

- (Canada) Diego Kapelan
- (United Kingdom) Matthew Bryan-Amaning
- (Iran) Aaron Geramipoor
- (Mexico) Daniel Amigo
- (Mexico) Moisés Andriassi
- (Mexico) Horacio Llamas
- (Mexico) Karim Malpica
- (Mexico) Román Martínez
- (Mexico) Lorenzo Mata
- (Mexico) Orlando Méndez-Valdez
- (Mexico) David Meza
- (Mexico) Anthony Pedroza
- (Mexico) Alex Pérez
- (Mexico) / (United States) Juan Toscano-Anderson
- (Mexico) Adrián Zamora
- (Nigeria) Chamberlain Oguchi
- (Panama) Javier Carter
- (Panama) Rubén Garcés
- (Puerto Rico) Devon Collier
- (Puerto Rico) Alex Franklin
- (United States) Branden Dawson
- (United States) Justin Keenan
- (United States) Walter Sharpe
- (United States) Greg Smith
- (United States) James Thomas
- (United States) DeJuan Wheat
- (Venezuela) David Cubillán
- (Venezuela) Miguel Marriaga
- (Venezuela) Anthony Pérez
- (Venezuela) José Gregorio Vargas
- (United States Virgin Islands) Ivan Aska

== See also ==
- Liga Nacional de Baloncesto Profesional
- FIBA Americas League
