= Aguacateros de Michoacán =

- Conference: West
- League: LNBP
- Founded: 2017
- Dissolved: 2021
- History: Garzas de Plata de la UAEH (1995–2016); Aguacateros de Michoacán (2017–2021)
- Arena: Auditorio de Usos Múltiples de la UMSNH
- Capacity: 3,500
- Location: Morelia, Michoacán, Mexico
- Team colors: Green, yellow, white, black
- President: Juan Manuel González Flores
- Head coach: Nicolás Casalánguida
- Championships: 0
Home	Away

Aguacateros de Michoacán (English: Michoacán Avocado Growers) was a professional Mexican basketball team, based in Morelia, Michoacán. The Aguacateros were part of the Liga Nacional de Baloncesto Profesional, the top professional basketball league in Mexico. The team played their home games at the Auditorio de Usos Múltiples de la UMSNH, with a capacity of 3,500 spectators.

Aguacateros was founded in 2017, when the Garzas de Plata de la UAEH were moved to Morelia for the 2017–18 season.

== History ==
Professional basketball in Michoacán dates back to 2006, when the Guerreros de Morelia team was established. The team, nevertheless, folded after the 2007–08 season.

In 2017, Garzas de Plata de la UAEH, a team that was part of the Autonomous University of the State of Hidalgo, had to leave the institution due to financial problems. The franchise then moved to Morelia and was rebranded as Aguacateros, meaning avocado growers.

The movement was officially announced on 11 October 2017, by Silvano Aureoles Conejo, Governor of Michoacán, who also stated that team was not being publicly funded by the State's government but privately by a group of businessmen.

== Players ==
=== Current roster ===
Note: Flags indicate national team eligibility at FIBA-sanctioned events. Players may hold other non-FIBA nationalities not displayed.

Aguacateros de Michoacán roster
Players
Coaches

Pos.	No.	Nat.	Name	Ht.	Wt.
G	8	(United States)	Sims, Donald	1.85 m (6 ft 1 in)	77 kg (170 lb)
F	10	(Argentina)	Piñero, Facundo	2.02 m (6 ft 8 in)	101 kg (223 lb)
G	12	(United States)	Holmes, Avry	1.89 m (6 ft 2 in)	85 kg (187 lb)
F	13	(United States)	Spurlock, Tristan	2.04 m (6 ft 8 in)	104 kg (229 lb)
F	16	(United States)	Green, Rodney	2.00 m (6 ft 7 in)	100 kg (220 lb)
C	17	(Mexico)	Reyna, Alejandro	2.06 m (6 ft 9 in)	114 kg (251 lb)
F	20	(Mexico)	Olalde, Raúl	1.96 m (6 ft 5 in)	91 kg (201 lb)
G	23	(Mexico)	Pérez, Michael	1.90 m (6 ft 3 in)	89 kg (196 lb)
F	24	(Mexico)	De Haro, Omar	1.88 m (6 ft 2 in)	87 kg (192 lb)
G	25	(Mexico)	Cortés, Cristian	1.85 m (6 ft 1 in)	84 kg (185 lb)
F	27	(Mexico)	Girón, Daniel	1.92 m (6 ft 4 in)	94 kg (207 lb)
C	33	(Mexico)	Zamora, Adrián	2.06 m (6 ft 9 in)	110 kg (243 lb)

Head coach

- (Argentina) Nicolás Casalánguida

Assistant coach(es)

- (Venezuela) Ronald Guillén

Athletic trainer(s)

- (Mexico) Jesús Tejeda

Legend

- (C) Team captain
- Injured

- Roster
Updated: 5 December 2020

=== Notable players ===
- Jerome Meyinsse (born 1988)
