= 2003 LNBP season =

- Season: 4
- Dates: July 29, 2003 – December 13, 2003
- Teams: 16

Finals
- Champions: Panteras de Aguascalientes
- Runners-up: La Ola Roja del Distrito Federal

Statistical leaders
Points	(United States) Devon Ford	1502
Rebounds	(United States) Kevin Beard	428
Assists	(Mexico) Daniel Anaya	280

The 2003 LNBP was the 4th season of the Liga Nacional de Baloncesto Profesional, one of the professional basketball leagues of Mexico. It started on July 29, 2003 and ended on December 13, 2003. The league title was won by Panteras de Aguascalientes, which defeated La Ola Roja del Distrito Federal in the championship series, 4–2.

== Format ==
16 teams participate. The first 8 teams in the regular season standings qualify for the playoffs. The playoffs have quarterfinals (best-of-5), semifinals (best-of-7) and finals (best-of-7).

== Teams ==
Team	City	State	Joined	Season No.
Algodoneros de la Comarca	Torreón	Coahuila	2000	4
Barreteros de Zacatecas	Zacatecas City	Zacatecas	2003	1
Cometas de Querétaro	Querétaro City	Querétaro	2003	1
Correcaminos UAT Matamoros	Matamoros	Tamaulipas	2000	4
Correcaminos UAT Victoria	Ciudad Victoria	Tamaulipas	2000	4
Fuerza Regia de Monterrey	Monterrey	Nuevo León	2001	3
Gambusinos de Fresnillo	Fresnillo	Zacatecas	2002	2
Halcones UV Xalapa	Xalapa	Veracruz	2003	1
Leñadores de Durango	Durango City	Durango	2002	2
Lobos de la UAdeC	Saltillo	Coahuila	2001	3
La Ola Roja del Distrito Federal	Mexico City	Distrito Federal	2000	4
Panteras de Aguascalientes	Aguascalientes City	Aguascalientes	2003	1
Santos Reales de San Luis	San Luis Potosí City	San Luis Potosí	2003	1
Tecos de la UAG	Guadalajara	Jalisco	2001	3
Tuberos de Colima	Colima City	Colima	2002	2
Zorros de la UMSNH	Morelia	Michoacán	2002	2

== Regular season ==
=== Standings ===
Pos	Team	Pld	W	L	PF	PA	PD	Pts	Qualification
1	Fuerza Regia de Monterrey	48	40	8	4715	4328	+387	88	2003 LNBP playoffs
2	Correcaminos UAT Victoria	48	31	17	4746	4474	+272	79	2003 LNBP playoffs
3	Cometas de Querétaro	48	29	19	4208	4065	+143	77	2003 LNBP playoffs
4	La Ola Roja del Distrito Federal	48	28	20	4419	4312	+107	76	2003 LNBP playoffs
5	Correcaminos UAT Matamoros	48	28	20	4695	4534	+161	76	2003 LNBP playoffs
6	Halcones UV Xalapa	48	28	20	4699	4474	+225	76	2003 LNBP playoffs
7	Panteras de Aguascalientes	48	27	21	4718	4514	+204	75	2003 LNBP playoffs
8	Lobos de la UAdeC	48	25	23	4804	4721	+83	73	2003 LNBP playoffs
9	Tecos de la UAG	48	24	24	4496	4415	+81	72	
10	Gambusinos de Fresnillo	48	24	24	4538	4471	+67	72	
11	Algodoneros de la Comarca	48	21	27	4599	4756	−157	69	
12	Barreteros de Zacatecas	48	21	27	4324	4393	−69	69	
13	Santos Reales de San Luis	48	20	28	4713	4753	−40	68	
14	Zorros de la UMSNH	48	19	29	4689	4909	−220	67	
15	Leñadores de Durango	48	11	37	4411	4864	−453	59	
16	Tuberos de Colima	48	8	40	4120	4911	−791	56	

Source: lnbp.com.mx

== Playoffs ==
The playoffs were played between November 18 and December 13, 2003.

- Semifinals (best-of-7, November 26 – December 4, 2003):

- Semifinal 1

- November 26: Halcones UV Xalapa 110, Panteras de Aguascalientes 84
- November 27: Halcones UV Xalapa 91, Panteras de Aguascalientes 82
- November 29: Panteras de Aguascalientes 103, Halcones UV Xalapa 92
- November 30: Panteras de Aguascalientes 96, Halcones UV Xalapa 83
- December 1: Panteras de Aguascalientes 96, Halcones UV Xalapa 85
- December 3: Halcones UV Xalapa 101, Panteras de Aguascalientes 77
- December 4: Panteras de Aguascalientes 103, Halcones UV Xalapa 84

Panteras de Aguascalientes wins the series 4–3 and qualify for the finals.

- Semifinal 2

- November 26: La Ola Roja del Distrito Federal 103, Lobos de la UAdeC 92
- November 27: La Ola Roja del Distrito Federal 91, Lobos de la UAdeC 82
- November 29: Lobos de la UAdeC 121, La Ola Roja del Distrito Federal 101
- November 30: Lobos de la UAdeC 102, La Ola Roja del Distrito Federal 96
- December 1: Lobos de la UAdeC 96, La Ola Roja del Distrito Federal 94
- December 3: La Ola Roja del Distrito Federal 109, Lobos de la UAdeC 72
- December 4: La Ola Roja del Distrito Federal 114, Lobos de la UAdeC 112

La Ola Roja del Distrito Federal wins the series 4–3 and qualify for the finals.

- Finals (best-of-7, December 6– December 13, 2003):

- December 6: La Ola Roja del Distrito Federal 89, Panteras de Aguascalientes 83
- December 7: La Ola Roja del Distrito Federal 87, Panteras de Aguascalientes 84
- December 9: Panteras de Aguascalientes 101, La Ola Roja del Distrito Federal 87
- December 10: Panteras de Aguascalientes 81, La Ola Roja del Distrito Federal 80
- December 11: Panteras de Aguascalientes 85, La Ola Roja del Distrito Federal 78
- December 13: Panteras de Aguascalientes 100, La Ola Roja del Distrito Federal 91

- Panteras de Aguascalientes wins the LNBP finals, 4–2.

== All-Star Game ==
In 2003, two All-Star Games were played. The first game was played in Fresnillo on September 21 and was won by the Foreigners team, 134–112. The second game was played in Matamoros and saw the Foreigners win, 117–90.

=== Teams ===
Teams for the first All-Star Game:

Mexicanos

- Miguel Acuña (Zorros de la UMSNH)
- Víctor Buelna (Zorros de la UMSNH)
- Isaac Gildea (Algodoneros de la Comarca)
- Javier González Rex (La Ola Roja del Distrito Federal)
- Abel Huerta (Tuberos de Colima)
- Alonso Izaguirre (Fuerza Regia de Monterrey)
- Eduardo Liñán (Correcaminos UAT Matamoros)
- Omar López (Tecos de la UAG)
- José Lozoya Portillo (Santos Reales de San Luis)
- Víctor Mariscal (Lobos de la UAdeC)
- Omar Quintero (Correcaminos UAT Victoria)
- Octavio Robles (Halcones UV Xalapa)
- Edwin Sánchez (Gambusinos de Fresnillo)
- Felipe Sánchez (Fuerza Regia de Monterrey)
- Francisco Siller (Lobos de la UAdeC)

- Coaches: Héctor Santos (Fuerza Regia de Monterrey)

Extranjeros

- (United States) Quincy Alexander (Correcaminos UAT Victoria)
- (United States) Chad Allen (Algodoneros de la Comarca)
- (United States) Kevin Beard (Correcaminos UAT Matamoros)
- (United States) Samuel Bowie (Tecos de la UAG)
- (United States) Devon Ford (Panteras de Aguascalientes)
- (United States) Rodney Gidney (Barreteros de Zacatecas)
- (United States) Reggie Jordan (Cometas de Querétaro)
- (United States) Carmelo Antrone Lee (Leñadores de Durango)
- (United States) Eric Martin (La Ola Roja del Distrito Federal)
- (United States) Jason McCutcheon (Lobos de la UAdeC)
- (United States) Tayron McDaniel (Correcaminos UAT Victoria)
- (United States) Eric Redeaux (Gambusinos de Fresnillo)
- (United States) Antonio Rivers (Fuerza Regia de Monterrey)
- (United States) Gerald Williams (Fuerza Regia de Monterrey)

- Coaches: (Argentina) Eduardo Opezzo (Gambusinos de Fresnillo)
