= 2004 LNBP season =

- Season: 5
- Dates: July 1, 2004 – December 8, 2004
- Teams: 20

Finals
- Champions: Santos Reales de San Luis
- Runners-up: Halcones UV Xalapa

The 2004 LNBP was the 5th season of the Liga Nacional de Baloncesto Profesional, one of the professional basketball leagues of Mexico. It started on July 1, 2004 and ended on December 8, 2004. The league title was won by Santos Reales de San Luis, which defeated Halcones UV Xalapa in the championship series, 4–2.

== Format ==
20 teams participate. The teams are divided in 2 groups of 10 teams each, called Zonas (zones): Zona Norte (North) and Zona Sur (South). The first 8 teams of each group qualify for the playoffs. The group playoffs have quarterfinals (best-of-5), semifinals (best-of-7) and finals (best-of-7). The winner of each group series qualify for the championship series (best-of-7), named Campeón de Campeones (Champion of Champions).

== Teams ==
Team	City	State	Joined	Season No.
Algodoneros de la Comarca	Torreón	Coahuila	2000	5
Barreteros de Zacatecas	Zacatecas City	Zacatecas	2003	2
Cometas de Querétaro	Querétaro City	Querétaro	2003	2
Coras de la UAN	Tepic	Nayarit	2004	1
Correcaminos UAT Matamoros	Matamoros	Tamaulipas	2000	5
Correcaminos UAT Tampico	Tampico	Tamaulipas	2000	2
Correcaminos UAT Victoria	Ciudad Victoria	Tamaulipas	2000	5
Fuerza Regia de Monterrey	Monterrey	Nuevo León	2001	4
Gambusinos de Fresnillo	Fresnillo	Zacatecas	2002	3
Garzas de Plata de la UAEH	Pachuca	Hidalgo	2000	3
Halcones UV Xalapa	Xalapa	Veracruz	2003	2
Lechugueros de León	León	Guanajuato	2004	1
Leñadores de Durango	Durango City	Durango	2002	3
Lobos de la UAdeC	Saltillo	Coahuila	2001	4
Lobos Plateados de la BUAP	Puebla	Puebla	2004	1
La Ola Roja del Distrito Federal	Mexico City	Distrito Federal	2000	5
Panteras de Aguascalientes	Aguascalientes City	Aguascalientes	2003	2
Santos Reales de San Luis	San Luis Potosí City	San Luis Potosí	2003	2
Tecos de la UAG	Guadalajara	Jalisco	2001	4
Tuberos de Colima	Colima City	Colima	2002	3

== Regular season ==
=== Zona Norte standings ===
Pos	Team	Pld	W	L	PF	PA	PD	Pts	Qualification
1	Santos Reales de San Luis	40	32	8	3960	3448	+512	72	2004 LNBP playoffs
2	Fuerza Regia de Monterrey	40	29	11	4039	3776	+263	69	2004 LNBP playoffs
3	Barreteros de Zacatecas	40	27	13	3996	3846	+150	67	2004 LNBP playoffs
4	Lobos de la UAdeC	40	24	16	4002	3907	+95	64	2004 LNBP playoffs
5	Correcaminos UAT Victoria	40	20	20	3762	3717	+45	60	2004 LNBP playoffs
6	Algodoneros de la Comarca	40	17	23	3870	3888	−18	57	2004 LNBP playoffs
7	Correcaminos UAT Matamoros	40	17	23	3780	3910	−130	57	2004 LNBP playoffs
8	Gambusinos de Fresnillo	40	16	24	3826	3905	−79	56	2004 LNBP playoffs
9	Correcaminos UAT Tampico	40	6	34	3367	3908	−541	46	
10	Leñadores de Durango	40	3	37	3353	4380	−1027	43	

Source: lnbp.com.mx

=== Zona Sur standings ===
Pos	Team	Pld	W	L	PF	PA	PD	Pts	Qualification
1	Halcones UV Xalapa	40	36	4	4182	3615	+567	76	2004 LNBP playoffs
2	Panteras de Aguascalientes	40	28	12	3895	3663	+232	68	2004 LNBP playoffs
3	Lechugueros de León	40	26	14	3871	3449	+422	66	2004 LNBP playoffs
4	La Ola Roja del Distrito Federal	40	24	16	3912	3682	+230	64	2004 LNBP playoffs
5	Tecos de la UAG	40	21	19	4036	3751	+285	61	2004 LNBP playoffs
6	Cometas de Querétaro	40	21	19	3724	3557	+167	61	2004 LNBP playoffs
7	Tuberos de Colima	40	16	24	3648	3898	−250	56	2004 LNBP playoffs
8	Coras de la UAN	40	13	27	3667	3932	−265	53	2004 LNBP playoffs
9	Garzas de Plata de la UAEH	40	16	24	3782	3975	−193	56	
10	Lobos Plateados de la BUAP	40	8	32	3456	3921	−465	48	

Source: lnbp.com.mx

Note: The LNBP website calculates 51 points for Garzas de Plata de la UAEH, thus ranking the team below Coras de la UAN.

== Playoffs ==
First round
N1	Santos Reales	3
N8	Gambusinos	0
N4	Lobos de la UAdeC	3
N5	UAT Victoria	0
N2	Fuerza Regia	3
N7	UAT Matamoros	1
N3	Barreteros	3
N6	Algodoneros	0
S1	Halcones UV	3
S8	Coras UAN	0
S4	La Ola	3
S5	Tecos UAG	2
S2	Panteras	3
S7	Tuberos	1
S3	Lechugueros	3
S6	Cometas	1

Zone Semifinals
N1	Santos Reales	3
N4	Lobos de la UAdeC	2
N2	Fuerza Regia	4
N3	Barreteros	3
S1	Halcones UV	4
S4	La Ola	3
S2	Panteras	0
S3	Lechugueros	4

Zone Finals
N1	Santos Reales	4
N2	Fuerza Regia	3
S1	Halcones UV	4
S3	Lechugueros	3

Final
N1	Santos Reales	4
S1	Halcones UV	2

== Copa Independencia ==
The first edition of the Copa Independencia, a tournament that took place in September, was played between the 8 best ranked teams at the end of the first part of the season. The tournament was won by Lobos de la UAdeC, which defeated Lechugueros de León, 94–88 in the final game played at Gimnasio Hermanos Carreón in Aguascalientes.

=== Quarterfinals ===
- September 5: Lecugueros de León 103, Fuerza Regia de Monterrey 92
- September 5: Halcones UV Xalapa 96, La Ola Roja del Distrito Federal 83
- September 6: Santos Reales de San Luis 105, Cometas de Querétaro 101
- September 6: Lobos de la UAdeC 129, Panteras de Aguascalientes 117 (2OT)

=== Semifinals ===
- September 7: Lechugueros de León 102, Santos Reales de San Luis 89
- September 7: Lobos de la UAdeC 122, Halcones UV Xalapa 116

=== Final ===
September 8, 2004
20:30

Boxscore

Lobos de la UAdeC 94, Lechugueros de León 88
Scoring by quarter: 30–23, 32–22, 19–27, 13–16
Pts: Cedric Patton 24; Rebs: James Penny 11; Asts: Enrique Zúñiga 6	Pts: Jason McCutcheon 27; Rebs: Jason McCutcheon 12; Asts: 2 players 5

Gimnasio Hermanos Carreón, Aguascalientes City, Aguascalientes

== All-Star Game ==
The 2004 LNBP All-Star Game was played in San Luis Potosí at the Auditorio Miguel Barragán on August 31, 2004. The game was played between a team of Mexican players (Mexicanos) and a team of foreign players (Extranjeros). The Mexican won, 111–106.

=== Teams ===
Mexicanos

- Miguel Acuña (Tecos de la UAG)
- Víctor Ávila (Halcones UV Xalapa)
- Enrique González (Halcones UV Xalapa)
- Javier González Rex (La Ola Roja del Distrito Federal)
- Alonso Izaguirre (Lobos de la UAC)
- Horacio Llamas (Lechugueros de León)
- Omar López (Tecos de la UAG)
- Víctor Mariscal (Lobos de la UAC)
- José Portillo (Santos Reales de San Luis)
- Omar Quintero (Fuerza Regia de Monterrey)
- Gabriel Sandoval (Lechugueros de León)
- Enrique Zúñiga (Lechugueros de León)

- Coaches: Ángel González (Halcones UV Xalapa) and Francisco Torres (Lechugueros de León)

Extranjeros

- (Senegal) Boubacar Aw (La Ola Roja del Distrito Federal)
- (United States) Devon Ford (Panteras de Aguascalientes)
- (United States) Reggie Jordan (Cometas de Querétaro)
- (Puerto Rico) Keenan Jourdon (Correcaminos UAT Victoria)
- (United States) Roland Lamont (Correcaminos UAT Matamoros)
- (United States) Andre Laws (Halcones UV Xalapa)
- (United States) Jason McCutcheon (Lobos de la UAC)
- (United States) Tyrone McDaniel (Correcaminos UAT Victoria)
- (United States) Matt Mitchell (Panteras de Aguascalientes)
- (United States) Antonio Rivers (Fuerza Regia de Monterrey)
- (United States) Jamaal Thomas (Santos Reales de San Luis)

- Coaches: (Mexico) Carlos Díaz Rodríguez (Garzas de Plata de la UAEH) and (Mexico) Luis Manuel López (Santos Reales de San Luis)
