= 2006 LNBP season =

- Season: 7
- Dates: July 6, 2006 – November 17, 2006
- Teams: 24

Finals
- Champions: Soles de Mexicali
- Runners-up: Halcones UV Xalapa

Statistical leaders
Points	(United States) Devon Ford	961
Rebounds	(United States) Galen Robinson	304
Assists	(Mexico) Jacinto Álvarez	166
Efficiency	(United States) Greg Lewis	968

The 2006 LNBP was the 7th season of the Liga Nacional de Baloncesto Profesional, one of the professional basketball leagues of Mexico. It started on July 6, 2006 and ended on November 17, 2006. The league title was won by Soles de Mexicali, which defeated Halcones UV Xalapa in the championship series, 4–3.

== Format ==
24 teams participate. The teams are divided in two groups of 12 teams each, called Zonas (zones): Zona Norte (North) and Zona Sur (South). The first 8 teams in each group qualify for the playoffs. The group playoffs have quarterfinals (best-of-5), semifinals (best-of-7) and finals (best-of-7). The winner of each group series qualify for the championship series (best-of-7), named Final de Finales (Final of Finals).

== Teams ==
Team	City	State	Joined	Season No.
Algodoneros de la Comarca	Torreón	Coahuila	2000	7
Astros de Tecate	Tecate	Baja California	2006	1
Barreteros de Zacatecas	Zacatecas City	Zacatecas	2003	4
Bucaneros de Campeche	Campeche City	Campeche	2006	1
Cimarrones de Ensenada	Ensenada	Baja California	2006	1
Cometas de Querétaro	Querétaro City	Querétaro	2003	4
Correcaminos UAT Matamoros	Matamoros	Tamaulipas	2000	7
Correcaminos UAT Reynosa	Reynosa	Tamaulipas	2000	3
Correcaminos UAT Victoria	Ciudad Victoria	Tamaulipas	2000	7
Fuerza Regia de Monterrey	Monterrey	Nuevo León	2001	6
Galgos de Tijuana	Tijuana	Baja California	2005	2
Gambusinos de Fresnillo	Fresnillo	Zacatecas	2002	5
Guerreros de Morelia	Morelia	Michoacán	2006	1
Halcones UV Veracruz	Veracruz	Veracruz	2005	2
Halcones UV Xalapa	Xalapa	Veracruz	2003	4
Lechugueros de León	León	Guanajuato	2004	3
Lobos de la UAdeC	Saltillo	Coahuila	2001	6
Lobos Grises de la UAD	Durango City	Durango	2005	2
La Ola Roja del Distrito Federal	Mexico City	Distrito Federal	2000	7
Mayas de Yucatán	Mérida	Yucatán	2006	1
Panteras de Aguascalientes	Aguascalientes City	Aguascalientes	2003	4
Pioneros de Quintana Roo	Cancún	Quintana Roo	2006	1
Santos Reales de San Luis	San Luis Potosí City	San Luis Potosí	2003	4
Soles de Mexicali	Mexicali	Baja California	2005	2

== Regular season ==
=== Zona Norte standings ===
Pos	Team	Pld	W	L	PF	PA	PD	Pts	Qualification
1	Soles de Mexicali	36	32	4	3361	2944	+417	68	2006 LNBP playoffs
2	Lobos Grises de la UAD	36	28	8	3649	3364	+285	64	2006 LNBP playoffs
3	Correcaminos UAT Reynosa	36	25	11	3607	3394	+213	61	2006 LNBP playoffs
4	Lobos de la UAdeC	36	22	14	3607	3448	+159	58	2006 LNBP playoffs
5	Correcaminos UAT Victoria	36	21	15	3409	3310	+99	57	2006 LNBP playoffs
6	Correcaminos UAT Matamoros	36	20	16	3129	3043	+86	56	2006 LNBP playoffs
7	Fuerza Regia de Monterrey	36	17	19	3259	3305	−46	53	2006 LNBP playoffs
8	Santos Reales de San Luis	36	17	19	3500	3484	+16	53	2006 LNBP playoffs
9	Galgos de Tijuana	36	15	21	3374	3342	+32	51	
10	Algodoneros de la Comarca	36	10	26	3448	3606	−158	46	
11	Cimarrones de Ensenada	36	10	26	3180	3411	−231	46	
12	Astros de Tecate	36	0	36	2755	3735	−980	36	

Source: lnbp.com.mx

=== Zona Sur standings ===
Pos	Team	Pld	W	L	PF	PA	PD	Pts	Qualification
1	Halcones UV Xalapa	36	30	6	3722	3252	+470	66	2006 LNBP playoffs
2	Lechugueros de León	36	24	12	3409	3265	+144	60	2006 LNBP playoffs
3	Cometas de Querétaro	36	24	12	3173	2979	+194	60	2006 LNBP playoffs
4	Halcones UV Veracruz	36	23	13	3571	3260	+311	59	2006 LNBP playoffs
5	Panteras de Aguascalientes	36	21	15	3144	3114	+30	57	2006 LNBP playoffs
6	La Ola Roja del Distrito Federal	36	21	15	3057	3042	+15	57	2006 LNBP playoffs
7	Mayas de Yucatán	36	19	17	3290	3353	−63	55	2006 LNBP playoffs
8	Bucaneros de Campeche	36	18	18	3247	3259	−12	54	2006 LNBP playoffs
9	Pioneros de Quintana Roo	36	10	26	3116	3280	−164	46	
10	Barreteros de Zacatecas	36	10	26	3142	3390	−248	46	
11	Gambusinos de Fresnillo	36	9	27	3417	3536	−119	45	
12	Guerreros de Morelia	36	6	30	3298	3748	−450	42	

Source: lnbp.com.mx

== Playoffs ==
First round
N1	Soles	3
N8	Santos Reales	0
N4	Lobos	3
N5	Correcaminos Vic.	1
N2	Lobos Grises	3
N7	Fuerza Regia	0
N3	Correcaminos Rey.	3
N6	Correcaminos Mat.	0
S1	Halcones Xal.	3
S8	Bucaneros	1
S4	Halcones Ver.	2
S5	Panteras	3
S2	Lechugueros	3
S7	Mayas	1
S3	Cometas	3
S6	Ola Roja	2

Zone Semifinals
N1	Soles	3
N4	Lobos	0
N2	Lobos Grises	3
N3	Correcaminos Rey.	0
S1	Halcones Xal.	3
S5	Panteras	0
S2	Lechugueros	3
S3	Cometas	1

Zone Finals
N1	Soles	4
N2	Lobos Grises	0
S1	Halcones Xal.	4
S2	Lechugueros	1

Final
N1	Soles	4
S1	Halcones Xal.	3

== Copa Independencia ==
The third edition of the Copa Independencia took place between July 18 and October 3, 2006. The LNBP changed the format of the competition: all the 24 teams played, divided in groups of 4 teams each. The two best teams of each group advanced to the following round.

The competition was won by Lobos Grises de la UAD, which defeated Halcones UV Xalapa over 2 games: the first saw Lobos Grises win, 114–108; the second game went to overtime and saw Halcones win, 107–102, but the Lobos Grises won the series, having scored more points overall.

=== Quarterfinals ===
==== First leg ====
All games played on August 29.

- Soles de Mexicali 92, Lobos Grises de la UAD 85
- Correcaminos UAT Reynosa 91, Galgos de Tijuana 83
- Halcones UV Xalapa 106, Pioneros de Quintana Roo 102
- Guerreros de Morelia 102, Panteras de Aguascalientes 80

==== Second leg ====
All games played on September 5.

- Lobos Grises de la UAD 114, Soles de Mexicali 78
- Correcaminos UAT Reynosa 105, Galgos 101
- Halcones UV Xalapa 96, Pioneros de Quintana Roo 87
- Panteras de Aguascalientes 86, Guerreros de Morelia 84

Qualified for the semifinals: Correcaminos UAT Reynosa, Guerreros de Morelia, Halcones UV Xalapa, Lobos Grises de la UAD.

=== Semifinals ===
==== First leg ====
All games played on September 12.

- Correcaminos UAT Reynosa 113, Lobos Grises de la UAD 106
- Halcones UV Xalapa 124, Guerreros de Morelia 102

==== Second leg ====
All games played on September 19.

- Lobos Grises de la UAD 118, Correcaminos UAT Reynosa 99
- Halcones UV Xalapa 124, Guerreros de Morelia 87

Qualified for the final game: Halcones UV Xalapa, Lobos Grises de la UAD.

=== Final ===
- September 26: Lobos Grises de la UAD 114, Halcones UV Xalapa 108
- October 3: Halcones UV Xalapa 107, Lobos Grises de la UAD 102 (OT)

Lobos Grises de la UAD wins the 2006 Copa Independencia.

== All-Star Game ==
The 2006 LNBP All-Star Game was played in Mérida, Yucatán at the Gimnasio Polifuncional on September 19, 2006. The game format was changed: from 2000 to 2005, the game was played between a team of foreign players, and a team of Mexican players; in 2006 the game became Zona Norte vs. Zona Sur, with no distinction between foreign and Mexican players. Zona Norte won, 122–104. The game MVP was Galen Robinson.

=== Teams ===
Zona Norte

- (Mexico) Miguel Acuña (Lobos Grises de la UAD)
- (United States) Myron Allen (Lobos Grises de la UAD)
- (Mexico) Noé Alonzo (Correcaminos UAT Matamoros)
- (United States) Romel Beck (Correcaminos UAT Victoria)
- (United States) Steven Esselink (Cimarrones de Ensenada)
- (Puerto Rico) Alex Falcón (Lobos de la UAdeC)
- (United States) Nick Jones (Lobos Grises de la UAD)
- (United States) Greg Lewis (Soles de Mexicali)
- (United States) Horacio Llamas (Soles de Mexicali)
- (United States) Jamario Moon (Fuerza Regia de Monterrey)
- (United States) Galen Robinson (Correcaminos UAT Reynosa)
- (United States) Jamaal Thomas (Santos Reales de San Luis)

- Coaches: (United States) Lewis LaSalle Taylor (Lobos Grises de la UAD) and (Mexico) José Luis Yebra (Correcaminos UAT Reynosa)

Zona Sur

- (Mexico) Víctor Ávila (Halcones UV Xalapa)
- (Senegal) Boubacar Aw (La Ola Roja del Distrito Federal)
- (United States) Samuel Bowie (Halcones UV Xalapa)
- (Mexico) Juan Pablo Bravo (Guerreros de Morelia)
- (United States) Charles Byrd (Halcones UV Veracruz)
- (United States) Daryl Dorsey (Mayas de Yucatán)
- (United States) Devon Ford (Panteras de Aguascalientes)
- (United States) Reggie Jordan (Cometas de Querétaro)
- (Mexico) Yahir Malpica (Bucaneros de Campeche)
- (Mexico) Omar Quintero (Pioneros de Quintana Roo)
- (Mexico) Jorge Rochín (Halcones UV Veracruz)
- (Mexico) Enrique Zúñiga (Lechugueros de León)

- Coaches: (Mexico) José Luis Arroyos (Halcones UV Veracruz) and (United States) Reggie Fox (Cometas de Querétaro)
