= 2002 LNBP season =

- Season: 3
- Dates: July 30, 2002 – December 7, 2002
- Teams: 12

Finals
- Champions: Correcaminos UAT Victoria
- Runners-up: Correcaminos UAT Matamoros

The 2002 LNBP was the 3rd season of the Liga Nacional de Baloncesto Profesional, one of the professional basketball leagues of Mexico. It started on July 30, 2002 and ended on December 7, 2002. The league title was won by Correcaminos UAT Victoria, which defeated Correcaminos UAT Matamoros in the championship series, 4–3. Gallos de Pelea de Ciudad Juárez then defeated Correcaminos UAT Victoria in the Campeón de Campeones series, 4–0.

== Format ==
12 teams participate. The first 8 teams in the regular season standings qualify for the playoffs. The playoffs have quarterfinals (best-of-5), semifinals (best-of-7) and finals (best-of-7).

Since Gallos de Pelea de Ciudad Juárez had been absent from the playoffs due to scheduling conflicts, for this season a special additional playoff series named Campeón de Campeones (Champion of Champions) was played. After Correcaminos UAT Victoria had won the playoff final series against Correcaminos UAT Matamoros, 4–3, an additional series was played between Correcaminos UAT Victoria and Gallos de Pelea de Ciudad Juárez to name the league champion.

== Teams ==
Team	City	State	Joined	Season No.
Algodoneros de la Comarca	Torreón	Coahuila	2000	3
Correcaminos UAT Matamoros	Matamoros	Tamaulipas	2000	3
Correcaminos UAT Victoria	Ciudad Victoria	Tamaulipas	2000	3
Fuerza Regia de Monterrey	Monterrey	Nuevo León	2001	2
Gallos de Pelea de Ciudad Juárez	Ciudad Juárez	Chihuahua	2001	2
Gambusinos de Fresnillo	Fresnillo	Zacatecas	2002	1
Leñadores de Durango	Durango City	Durango	2002	1
Lobos de la UAdeC	Saltillo	Coahuila	2001	2
La Ola Roja del Distrito Federal	Mexico City	Distrito Federal	2000	3
Tecos de la UAG	Guadalajara	Jalisco	2001	2
Tuberos de Colima	Colima City	Colima	2002	1
Zorros de la UMSNH	Morelia	Michoacán	2002	1

== Regular season ==
=== Standings ===
Pos	Team	Pld	W	L	PF	PA	PD	Pts	Qualification
1	Gallos de Pelea de Ciudad Juárez	44	34	10	4167	3746	+421	78	
2	Tecos de la UAG	44	33	11	4410	4032	+378	77	2002 LNBP playoffs
3	Correcaminos UAT Victoria	44	29	15	4374	4143	+231	73	2002 LNBP playoffs
4	Fuerza Regia de Monterrey	44	28	16	4266	4025	+241	72	2002 LNBP playoffs
5	Lobos de la UAdeC	44	28	16	4142	3990	+152	72	2002 LNBP playoffs
6	Correcaminos UAT Matamoros	44	26	18	4283	4071	+212	70	2002 LNBP playoffs
7	La Ola Roja del Distrito Federal	44	22	22	4255	4316	−61	66	2002 LNBP playoffs
8	Gambusinos de Fresnillo	44	17	27	3917	4019	−102	61	2002 LNBP playoffs
9	Leñadores de Durango	44	16	28	4126	4313	−187	60	2002 LNBP playoffs
10	Zorros de la UMSNH	44	16	28	4195	4337	−142	60	
11	Algodoneros de la Comarca	44	12	32	4199	4459	−260	56	
12	Tuberos de Colima	44	3	41	4008	4891	−883	47	

Source: lnbp.com.mx

== Playoffs ==
The playoffs were played between November 5 and December 1, 2002. After the championship finals, an additional series named Campeón de Campeones was played, ending on December 7 with the Gallos de Pelea de Ciudad Juárez defeating Correcaminos UAT Victoria, 4–0.

- Finals (best-of-7, November 23 – December 1, 2002):

- November 23: Correcaminos UAT Victoria 94, Correcaminos UAT Matamoros 83
- November 24: Correcaminos UAT Matamoros 94, Correcaminos UAT Victoria 78
- November 26: Correcaminos UAT Victoria 99, Correcaminos UAT Matamoros 90
- November 27: Correcaminos UAT Matamoros 103, Correcaminos UAT Victoria 99
- November 28: Correcaminos UAT Matamoros 85, Correcaminos UAT Matamoros 80
- November 30: Correcaminos UAT Victoria 91, Correcaminos UAT Matamoros 78
- December 1: Correcaminos UAT Victoria 81, Correcaminos UAT Matamoros 69

Correcaminos UAT Victoria wins the LNBP finals, 4–3.

- Campeón de Campeones (best-of-7):

- Game 1: Gallos de Pelea de Ciudad Juárez 108, Correcaminos UAT Victoria 79
- Game 2: Gallos de Pelea de Ciudad Juárez 101, Correcaminos UAT Victoria 98
- Game 3: Gallos de Pelea de Ciudad Juárez 88, Correcaminos UAT Victoria 83
- Game 4 (December 7): Gallos de Pelea de Ciudad Juárez 101, Correcaminos UAT Victoria 86

Gallos de Pelea de Ciudad Juárez wins the Campeón de Campeones series, 4–0.

== All-Star Game ==
In 2002, two All-Star Games were played. The first game was played in Monterrey on September 15 and was won by the Mexican team, 123–98. The second game was played on October 12, 2002 at the Gimnasio Olímpico Juan de la Barrera in Mexico City, and saw the Mexican win, 102–88.

=== Teams ===
Teams for the second All-Star Game:

Mexicanos

- Víctor Buelna (Zorros de la UMSNH)
- Florentino Chávez (Correcaminos UAT Victoria)
- César Fierros (Gambusinos de Fresnillo)
- Enrique González (Gallos de Pelea de Ciudad Juárez)
- Javier González Rex (La Ola Roja del Distrito Federal)
- Omar López (Tecos de la UAG)
- Daniel Macías (La Ola Roja del Distrito Federal)
- Fernando Moreno (Tuberos de Colima)
- Anthony Norwood (Tecos de la UAG)
- Omar Quintero (Correcaminos UAT Victoria)
- Francisco Siller (Lobos de la UAdeC)

- Coaches: Jorge León Flores (Tecos de la UAG) and Raúl Palma (Gallos de Pelea de Ciudad Juárez)

Extranjeros

- (United States) Samuel Bowie (Gallos de Pelea de Ciudad Juárez)
- (United States) Gerald Burris (Tuberos de Colima)
- (United States) Nicolas Cordero (Zorros de la UMSNH)
- (United States) Lester Hood (Correcaminos UAT Matamoros)
- (United States) Michael Johnson (Correcaminos UAT Matamoros)
- (Puerto Rico) Keenan Jourdon (Correcaminos UAT Victoria)
- (Puerto Rico) Wilfredo Pagán (Leñadores de Durango)
- (United States) Marshall Phillips (La Ola Roja del Distrito Federal)
- (United States) Artha Reeves (Gambusinos de Fresnillo)
- (United States) Jermaine Tate (La Ola Roja del Distrito Federal)
- (United States) Todd Williams (Tecos de la UAG)

- Coaches: (Venezuela) Carlos Mercado (Lobos de la UAdeC) and (Argentina) Marcelo Richotti (Leñadores de Durango)
