= 2001 LNBP season =

- Season: 2
- Dates: July 31, 2001 – November 29, 2001
- Teams: 12

Finals
- Champions: Gallos de Pelea de Ciudad Juárez
- Runners-up: Lobos UAdeC

Statistical leaders
| Points | (United States) Samuel Bowie | 927 |
| Assists | (United States) Jeff Clifton | 157 |

The 2001 LNBP was the 2nd season of the Liga Nacional de Baloncesto Profesional, one of the professional basketball leagues of Mexico. It started on July 31, 2001 and ended on November 29, 2001. The league title was won by Gallos de Pelea de Ciudad Juárez, which defeated Lobos UAdeC in the championship series.

== Format ==
12 teams participate. The first 8 teams in the regular season standings qualify for the playoffs. The playoffs have quarterfinals (best-of-5), semifinals (best-of-7) and finals (best-of-7).

== Teams ==
| Team | City | State | Joined | Season No. |
|---|---|---|---|---|
| Algodoneros de la Comarca | Torreón | Coahuila | 2000 | 2 |
| Correcaminos UAT Matamoros | Matamoros | Tamaulipas | 2000 | 2 |
| Correcaminos UAT Victoria | Ciudad Victoria | Tamaulipas | 2000 | 2 |
| Dorados de Chihuahua | Chihuahua City | Chihuahua | 2000 | 2 |
| Fuerza Regia de Monterrey | Monterrey | Nuevo León | 2001 | 1 |
| Gallos de Pelea de Ciudad Juárez | Ciudad Juárez | Chihuahua | 2001 | 1 |
| Garzas de Plata de la UAEH | Pachuca | Hidalgo | 2000 | 2 |
| Garzas Guerreras de la UATX | Tlaxcala City | Tlaxcala | 2001 | 1 |
| León (Morelia) | Morelia | Michoacán | 2001 | 1 |
| Lobos de la UAdeC | Saltillo | Coahuila | 2001 | 1 |
| La Ola Roja del Distrito Federal | Mexico City | Distrito Federal | 2000 | 2 |
| Tecos de la UAG | Guadalajara | Jalisco | 2001 | 1 |

== Regular season ==
=== Standings ===
| Pos | Team | Pld | W | L | PF | PA | PD | Pts | Qualification |
|---|---|---|---|---|---|---|---|---|---|
| 1 | Correcaminos UAT Victoria | 44 | 31 | 13 | 4462 | 4131 | +331 | 75 | 2001 LNBP playoffs |
| 2 | Fuerza Regia de Monterrey | 44 | 31 | 13 | 4321 | 3902 | +419 | 75 | 2001 LNBP playoffs |
| 3 | Tecos de la UAG | 44 | 29 | 15 | 4364 | 4141 | +223 | 73 | 2001 LNBP playoffs |
| 4 | Correcaminos UAT Matamoros | 44 | 28 | 16 | 4235 | 3966 | +269 | 72 | 2001 LNBP playoffs |
| 5 | Algodoneros de la Comarca | 44 | 27 | 17 | 4371 | 4239 | +132 | 71 | 2001 LNBP playoffs |
| 6 | Gallos de Pelea de Ciudad Juárez | 44 | 26 | 18 | 4306 | 4099 | +207 | 70 | 2001 LNBP playoffs |
| 7 | Lobos de la UAdeC | 44 | 23 | 21 | 4350 | 4198 | +152 | 67 | 2001 LNBP playoffs |
| 8 | Garzas de Plata de la UAEH | 44 | 21 | 23 | 4167 | 4082 | +85 | 65 | 2001 LNBP playoffs |
| 9 | La Ola Roja del Distrito Federal | 44 | 18 | 26 | 4231 | 4371 | −140 | 62 | |
| 10 | Dorados de Chihuahua | 44 | 14 | 30 | 3790 | 4105 | −315 | 58 | |
| 11 | León (Morelia) | 44 | 12 | 32 | 4129 | 4792 | −663 | 56 | |
| 12 | Garzas Guerreras de la UATX | 44 | 4 | 40 | 4083 | 4783 | −700 | 48 | |

Source: lnbp.com.mx

== Playoffs ==
- Finals (best-of-7, November 24 – December 2):

November 24, 2001: Gallos de Pelea de Ciudad Juárez 102, Lobos de la UAdeC 97
November 25, 2001: Gallos de Pelea de Ciudad Juárez 101, Lobos de la UAdeC 90
November 27, 2001: Lobos de la UAdeC 99, Gallos de Pelea de Ciudad Juárez 89
November 28, 2001: Gallos de Pelea de Ciudad Juárez 95, Lobos de la UAdeC 90
November 29, 2001: Gallos de Pelea de Ciudad Juárez 101, Lobos de la UAdeC 86

Gallos de Pelea de Ciudad Juárez wins the championship series, 4–1.

== All-Star Game ==
The second LNBP All-Star Game was played in Torreón. The game was played between a team of Mexican players (Mexicanos) and a team of foreign players (Extranjeros). The Mexican won, 119–116.

=== Teams ===
Mexicanos

- Guillermo Cepeda (Algodoneros de la Comarca)
- Florentino Chávez (Correcaminos UAT Victoria)
- Cristian González (Dorados de Chihuahua)
- Enrique González (Gallos de Pelea de Ciudad Juárez)
- Eduardo Lin (Correcaminos UAT Matamoros)
- Daniel Macías (La Ola Roja del Distrito Federal)
- Víctor Mariscal (Lobos de la UAdeC)
- Alberto Martínez (Algodoneros de la Comarca)
- Arturo Montes (Tecos de la UAG)
- Erick Ortiz (León)
- Omar Quintero (Correcaminos UAT Victoria)
- Octavio Robles (Garzas Guerreras de la UATX)
- Felipe Sánchez (Fuerza Regia de Monterrey)
- Rafael Sandoval (La Ola Roja del Distrito Federal)
- Francisco Siller (Lobos de la UAdeC)

- Coaches: Jorge León Flores (Tecos de la UAG) and Adolfo Sánchez (Correcaminos UAT Matamoros)

Extranjeros

- (United States) Samuel Bowie (Gallos de Pelea de Ciudad Juárez)
- (United States) Quincy Brewer (Dorados de Chihuahua)
- (United States) Jeff Clifton (La Ola Roja del Distrito Federal)
- (United States) Romano Dees (León)
- (United States) Chris Doyal (Lobos de la UAdeC)
- (Mexico) Javier González Rex (Garzas de Plata de la UAEH)
- (United States) Carlus Groves (Fuerza Regia de Monterrey)
- (Puerto Rico) Bobby Joe Hatton (Correcaminos UAT Victoria)
- (Dominican Republic) Tito Horford (Garzas de Plata de la UAEH)
- (United States) Michael Johnson (Correcaminos UAT Matamoros)
- (United States) Alvin Mobley (Tecos de la UAG)
- (United States) Antonio Rivers (Fuerza Regia de Monterrey)
- (United States) Matt Watts (Algodoneros de la Comarca)
- (United States) Frank Wilkins (Garzas Guerreras de la UATX)
- (United States) Gerald Williams (Fuerza Regia de Monterrey)

- Coaches: (Mexico) Oswaldo Paredes (Fuerza Regia de Monterrey) and (Mexico) Antonio Segura (Algodoneros de la Comarca)
