= Gustavo Quintero (basketball) =

Mexican basketball coach

Mexico (Assistant)
- Position: Head coach

Personal information
- Born: 17 December 1976 (age 49) Nogales, Sonora, Mexico
- Coaching career: 2016–present

Career history

Coaching
- 2016: Halcones de Ciudad Obregón (Assistant)
- 2018: Soles de Ojinaga
- 2019: Santos del Potosí
- 2020: Soles de Ojinaga
- 2020: Huracanes de Tampico (Assistant)
- 2021: Soles de Ojinaga
- 2021: Libertadores de Querétaro (Assistant)
- 2021–: Mexico (Assistant)
- 2022: Halcones de Xalapa (women)
- 2022–2023: Libertadores de Querétaro (Assistant)
- 2024: Ángeles de la Ciudad de México
- 2025–2026: Caballeros de Culiacán

Gustavo Quintero Pereda (born 17 December 1976) is a Mexican basketball coach. He is the head coach of the Caballeros de Culiacán.

== Coaching career ==
Quintero started his coaching career with Halcones de Ciudad Obregón in the CIBACOPA league. He has coached teams such as Halcones de Xalapa (both men's and women's squads), Libertadores de Querétaro, Huracanes de Tampico, and Santos de San Luis. Quintero has served as an assistant coach for Halcones de Ciudad Obregón and Zonkeys de Tijuana, and as head coach for Ángeles de la Ciudad de México in 2024. Served as an assistant coach during tournaments such as the FIBA AmeriCup and the FIBA World Cup. Appointed head coach for Mexico during the 2023 Central American and Caribbean Games in San Salvador (where the team won a silver medal) and the Pan American Games in Santiago. In 2023, Gustavo Quintero Pereda was awarded “Athlete of the Year” in the Best Coach category in his hometown, Nogales, in recognition of his contributions to the sport and his impact on the basketball community. As of January 2025, Quintero is the head coach of Caballeros de Culiacán in the Liga Chevron CIBACOPA.

== Personal life ==
Gustavo Quintero is the older brother of fellow basketball coach Omar Quintero.
