= 2000 LNBP season =

- Season: 1
- Dates: August 7, 2000 – December 10, 2000
- Teams: 11

Finals
- Champions: Correcaminos UAT Tampico
- Runners-up: Correcaminos UAT Victoria

The 2000 LNBP was the 1st season of the Liga Nacional de Baloncesto Profesional, one of the professional basketball leagues of Mexico. It started on August 7, 2000 and ended in December 2000. The league title was won by Correcaminos UAT Tampico, which defeated Correcaminos UAT Victoria in the championship series.

== Format ==
11 teams take part in the season. Since the number of teams is odd, one team rests each week. The teams are divided in two groups (A and B), and their ranking among these groups depends on their position in the regular season standings. The first 4 teams of each group qualify for the postseason.

== Teams ==
| Team | City | State | Joined | Season № |
|---|---|---|---|---|
| Algodoneros de la Comarca | Torreón | Coahuila | 2000 | 1 |
| Correcaminos UAT Matamoros | Matamoros | Tamaulipas | 2000 | 1 |
| Correcaminos UAT Reynosa | Reynosa | Tamaulipas | 2000 | 1 |
| Correcaminos UAT Tampico | Tampico | Tamaulipas | 2000 | 1 |
| Correcaminos UAT Victoria | Ciudad Victoria | Tamaulipas | 2000 | 1 |
| Dorados de Chihuahua | Chihuahua City | Chihuahua | 2000 | 1 |
| Garzas de Plata de la UAEH | Pachuca | Hidalgo | 2000 | 1 |
| Indios de la UACJ | Ciudad Juárez | Chihuahua | 2000 | 1 |
| La Ola Roja del Distrito Federal | Mexico City | Distrito Federal | 2000 | 1 |
| Osos de Saltillo | Saltillo | Coahuila | 2000 | 1 |
| Vaqueros de Agua Prieta | Agua Prieta | Sonora | 2000 | 1 |

== Regular season ==
=== Standings ===
| Pos | Team | Pld | W | L | PF | PA | PD | Pts |
|---|---|---|---|---|---|---|---|---|
| 1 | Osos de Saltillo | 40 | 30 | 10 | 4253 | 3993 | +260 | 70 |
| 2 | Indios de la UACJ | 40 | 26 | 14 | 3461 | 3364 | +97 | 66 |
| 3 | Correcaminos UAT Tampico | 40 | 26 | 14 | 3486 | 3339 | +147 | 66 |
| 4 | Correcaminos UAT Matamoros | 40 | 26 | 14 | 3468 | 3381 | +87 | 66 |
| 5 | Correcaminos UAT Victoria | 40 | 25 | 15 | 3606 | 3376 | +230 | 65 |
| 6 | Vaqueros de Agua Prieta | 40 | 22 | 18 | 3945 | 3740 | +205 | 62 |
| 7 | Algodoneros de la Comarca | 40 | 18 | 22 | 3722 | 3653 | +69 | 58 |
| 8 | Dorados de Chihuahua | 40 | 17 | 23 | 3417 | 3588 | −171 | 57 |
| 9 | Correcaminos UAT Reynosa | 40 | 13 | 27 | 3352 | 3598 | −246 | 53 |
| 10 | La Ola Roja del Distrito Federal | 40 | 10 | 30 | 3517 | 3800 | −283 | 50 |
| 11 | Garzas de Plata de la UAEH | 40 | 7 | 33 | 3548 | 3943 | −395 | 47 |

Source: lnbp.com.mx

=== Groups ===
==== Group A ====
| Pos | Team | Pld | W | L | PF | PA | PD | Pts | Qualification |
|---|---|---|---|---|---|---|---|---|---|
| 1 | Osos de Saltillo | 40 | 30 | 10 | 4253 | 3993 | +260 | 70 | 2000 LNBP playoffs |
| 2 | Indios de la UACJ | 40 | 26 | 14 | 3461 | 3364 | +97 | 66 | 2000 LNBP playoffs |
| 3 | Correcaminos UAT Matamoros | 40 | 26 | 14 | 3468 | 3381 | +87 | 66 | 2000 LNBP playoffs |
| 4 | Algodoneros de la Comarca | 40 | 18 | 22 | 3722 | 3653 | +69 | 58 | 2000 LNBP playoffs |
| 5 | Dorados de Chihuahua | 40 | 17 | 23 | 3417 | 3588 | −171 | 57 | |

Source: lnbp.com.mx

==== Group B ====
| Pos | Team | Pld | W | L | PF | PA | PD | Pts | Qualification |
|---|---|---|---|---|---|---|---|---|---|
| 1 | Correcaminos UAT Tampico | 40 | 26 | 14 | 3486 | 3339 | +147 | 66 | 2000 LNBP playoffs |
| 2 | Correcaminos UAT Victoria | 40 | 25 | 15 | 3606 | 3376 | +230 | 65 | 2000 LNBP playoffs |
| 3 | Vaqueros de Agua Prieta | 40 | 22 | 18 | 3945 | 3740 | +205 | 62 | 2000 LNBP playoffs |
| 4 | Correcaminos UAT Reynosa | 40 | 13 | 27 | 3352 | 3598 | −246 | 53 | |
| 5 | La Ola Roja del Distrito Federal | 40 | 10 | 30 | 3517 | 3800 | −283 | 50 | 2000 LNBP playoffs |
| 6 | Garzas de Plata de la UAEH | 40 | 7 | 33 | 3548 | 3943 | −395 | 47 | |

Source: lnbp.com.mx

== Playoffs ==
Note: for reasons not specified on the LNBP website, La Ola Roja del Distrito Federal was the fourth team qualified from the Group B, despite being ranked 5th. The team playing the first game at home is listed first.

- Quarterfinals (best-of-5, played November 14 – November 20):

- Osos de Saltillo (A1) vs. La Ola Roja del Distrito Federal (B4)
- Indios de la UACJ (A2) vs. Vaqueros de Agua Prieta (B3)
- Correcaminos UAT Matamoros (A3) vs. Correcaminos UAT Victoria (B2)
- Correcaminos Tampico (B1) vs. Algodoneros de la Comarca (B4)

- Semifinals (best-of-7, played November 22 – November 30):

- Correcaminos UAT Victoria vs. * Indios de la UACJ
- Correcaminos UAT Tampico vs. * Osos de Saltillo

- Finals (best-of-7, played December 2 – December 10):

- Correcaminos UAT Tampico vs. Correcaminos UAT Victoria

== All-Star Game ==
The first LNBP All-Star Game was played in Ciudad Victoria at the Gimnasio Multidisciplinario de la Universidad Autónoma de Tamaulipas de Ciudad Victoria on October 19, 2000 at 20:30, and was broadcast by ESPN2. The game was played between a team of Mexican players (Mexicanos) and a team of foreign players (Extranjeros). The Mexican won, 104–98. The game MVP was Mexican José Escobedo.

=== Teams ===
Mexicanos

- David Amaya (Correcaminos UAT Matamoros)
- Rafael Bellamy (Garzas de Plata de la UAEH)
- Florentino Chávez (Correcaminos UAT Tampico)
- José Escobedo (Indios de la UACJ)
- Erick Langford (Correcaminos UAT Matamoros)
- Eduardo Liñan (Vaqueros de Agua Prieta)
- Víctor Mariscal (Osos de Saltillo)
- Arturo Montes (Dorados de Chihuahua)
- Omar Quintero (Correcaminos UAT Victoria)
- Antonio Reyes (Correcaminos UAT Reynosa)
- Rafael Sandoval (La Ola Roja del Distrito Federal)
- Francisco Siller (Osos de Saltillo)
- Rafael Solís (Correcaminos UAT Victoria)

- Coaches: Lewis Lasalle Taylor (Dorados de Chihuahua) and Luis Manuel López (Correcaminos UAT Tampico)

Extranjeros

- (United States) Richard Cannon (La Ola Roja del Distrito Federal)
- (Puerto Rico) James Carter (Correcaminos UAT Tampico)
- (United States) Chris Doyal (Osos de Saltillo)
- (Puerto Rico) Alex Falcón (Algodoneros de la Comarca)
- (Puerto Rico) Bobby Joe Hatton (Correcaminos UAT Victoria)
- (Puerto Rico) Keenan Jourdon (Vaqueros de Agua Prieta)
- (Panama) Guillermo Myers (Correcaminos UAT Tampico)
- (United States) Berry Randle (Correcaminos UAT Reynosa)
- (United States) DeRon Rutledge (Dorados de Chihuahua)
- (United States) Dwight Stewart (Correcaminos UAT Victoria)
- (United States) Larry Washington (Garzas de Plata de la UAEH)
- (United States) Matt Watts (Algodoneros de la Comarca)
- (United States) Steve Wise (Indios de la UACJ)

- Coaches: (Spain) José Claros (Correcaminos UAT Victoria) and (Spain) Antonio Forteza (Osos de Saltillo)
