= Raúl Palma =

Mexican basketball player (born 1950)

Raúl Palma Cano (born 16 April 1950) is a Mexican former basketball player and coach. In 2001 and 2002 he coached Gallos de Pelea de Ciudad Juárez of the Liga Nacional de Baloncesto Profesional.
