= 2003 Tournament of the Americas =

Basketball tournament

Tournament details
- Host country: Puerto Rico
- Dates: August 20–31
- Teams: 10
- Venue: 1 (in 1 host city)

Final positions
- Champions: United States (5th title)
- Runners-up: Argentina
- Third place: Puerto Rico
- Fourth place: Canada

Tournament statistics
- MVP: (Canada) Steve Nash
- Top scorer: (Mexico) Omar Quintero (21.1 points per game)

The 2003 Tournament of the Americas in basketball, later known as the FIBA Americas Championship and the FIBA AmeriCup (also known as Las Americas Tournament for Men, FIBA Americas Olympic Qualifying Tournament, or Panamerican Olympic Qualifying Tournament for Men), was hosted by Puerto Rico, from August 20 to August 31, 2003. The games were played in San Juan, at the Roberto Clemente Coliseum. This FIBA AmeriCup was to earn the three berths allocated to the Americas for the 2004 Olympics in Athens, Greece. The United States won the tournament, the country's fifth AmeriCup championship.

== Venues ==
All games were played at the Roberto Clemente Coliseum.

San Juan
Roberto Clemente Coliseum
Capacity: 10,000
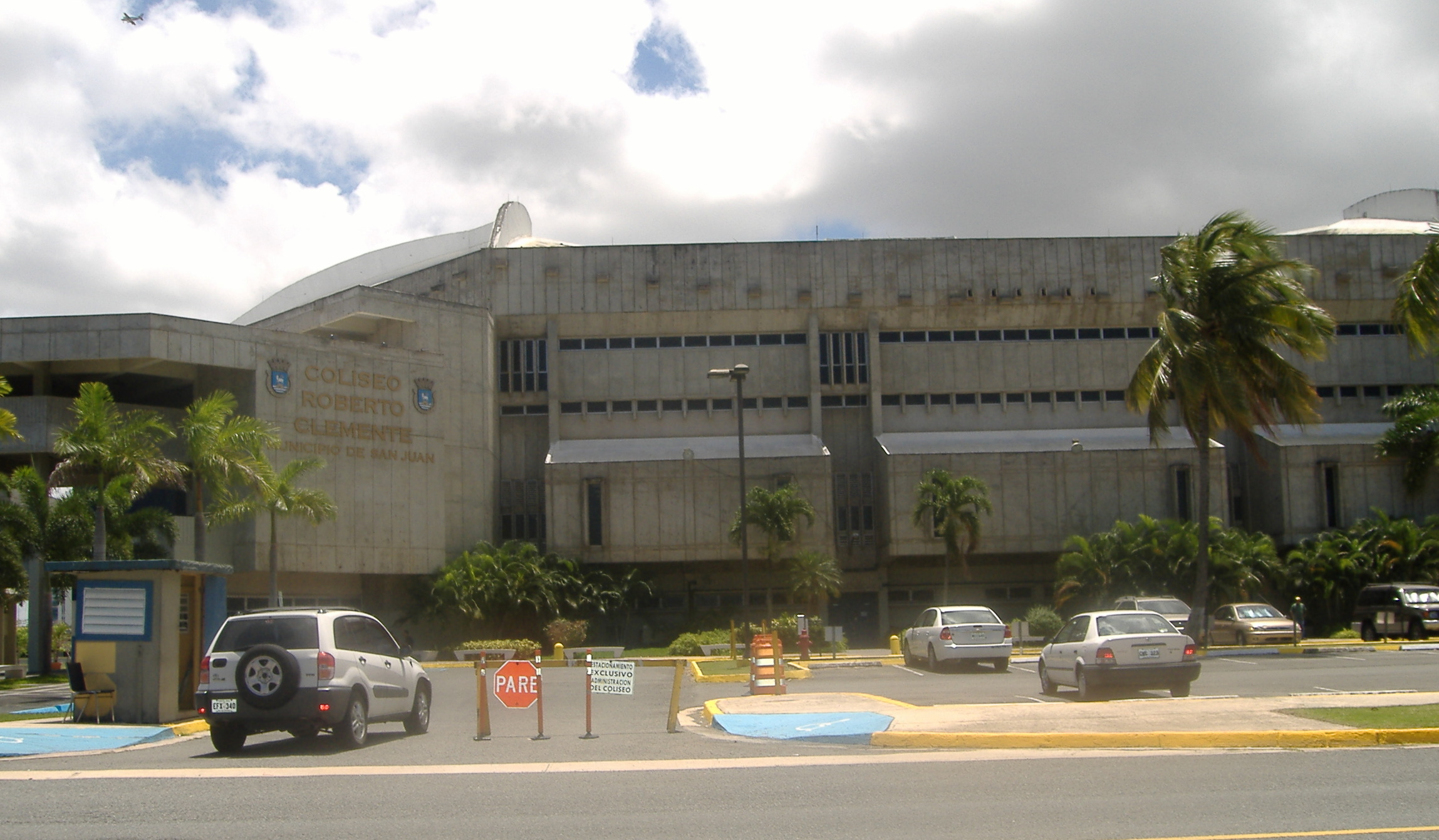

== Qualification ==
Eight teams qualified during the qualification tournaments held in their respective zones in 2003; two teams (USA and Canada) qualified automatically since they are the only members of the North America zone.

- North America: Canada, United States
- Caribbean and Central America:Dominican Republic, Mexico, Puerto Rico, Virgin Islands
- South America: Argentina, Brazil, Uruguay, Venezuela

The draw split the tournament into two groups:

Group A

Argentina
Canada
Mexico
Puerto Rico
Uruguay

Group B

Brazil
Dominican Republic
United States
Venezuela
Virgin Islands

== Format ==
- The top four teams from each group advance to the quarterfinals.
- Results and standings among teams within the same group are carried over.
- The top four teams at the quarterfinals advance to the semifinals (1 vs. 4, 2 vs. 3).
- The winners in the knockout semifinals advance to the Final, where both were granted berths in the 2004 Olympic Tournament in Athens. The losers figure in a third-place playoff where the winner was granted the third berth.

=== Tie-breaking criteria ===
Ties are broken via the following the criteria, with the first option used first, all the way down to the last option:

1. Head to head results
2. Goal average (not the goal difference) between the tied teams
3. Goal average of the tied teams for all teams in its group

== Preliminary round ==
| Qualified for the quarterfinals |

Times given below are in Atlantic Standard Time (UTC-4).

=== Group A ===
| Team | Pld | W | L | PF | PA | PD | Pts | Tie |
|---|---|---|---|---|---|---|---|---|
| Argentina | 4 | 3 | 1 | 359 | 321 | +38 | 7 | 1–0 |
| Canada | 4 | 3 | 1 | 377 | 329 | +48 | 7 | 0–1 |
| Puerto Rico | 4 | 2 | 2 | 342 | 322 | +20 | 6 | 1–0 |
| Mexico | 4 | 2 | 2 | 313 | 357 | −44 | 6 | 0–1 |
| Uruguay | 4 | 0 | 4 | 290 | 352 | −62 | 4 | |

August 20
2:30 p.m.

Boxscore

| Argentina | 89–91 | Mexico |
Scoring by quarter: 19–24, 22–21, 19–28, 29–18
| Pts: Nocioni, Scola 17; Rebs: Ginóbili 6 Asts: Ginóbili 7 | | Pts: Nájera 20; Rebs: Llamas 10; Asts: Mariscal, Nájera 4 |

Roberto Clemente Coliseum, San Juan

August 20
7:30 p.m.

Boxscore

| Uruguay | 78–91 | Puerto Rico |
Scoring by quarter: 14–17, 32–28, 16–21, 16–25
| Pts: Owens 22; Rebs: Muro, Szczygielski 4 Asts: Muro 5 | | Pts: Arroyo, Ortiz 20; Rebs: Ortiz 12; Asts: Ortiz 4 |

Roberto Clemente Coliseum, San Juan

August 21
2:30 p.m.

Boxscore

| Uruguay | 60–91 | Argentina |
Scoring by quarter: 11–19, 17–24, 16–24, 16–24
| Pts: Mazzarino 13; Rebs: Aguiar, Owens 4 Asts: Muro 4 | | Pts: Nocioni 14; Rebs: Fernández 12; Asts: Montecchia 6 |

Roberto Clemente Coliseum, San Juan

August 21
8:00 p.m.

Boxscore

| Puerto Rico | 79–89 | Canada |
Scoring by quarter: 26–18, 25–26, 13–22, 15–23
| Pts: Casiano 24; Rebs: Fajardo 6 Asts: Arroyo 4 | | Pts: Barrett 32; Rebs: Newton 14; Asts: Nash 7 |

Roberto Clemente Coliseum, San Juan

August 22
2:30 p.m.

Boxscore

| Mexico | 80–68 | Uruguay |
Scoring by quarter: 26–18, 25–26, 13–22, 15–23
| Pts: Nájera 21; Rebs: Nájera 9 Asts: Llamas 4 | | Pts: Owens 17; Rebs: Bouzot 8 Asts: Mazzarino 5 |

Roberto Clemente Coliseum, San Juan

August 22
5:00 p.m.

Boxscore

| Argentina | 94–90 | Canada |
Scoring by quarter: 21–14, 27–25, 17–27, 29–24
| Pts: Scola 21; Rebs: Nocioni 9 Asts: Ginóbili 6 | | Pts: Nash 24; Rebs: Newton 5 Asts: Nash 10 |

Roberto Clemente Coliseum, San Juan

August 23
2:30 p.m.

Boxscore

| Canada | 90–84 | Uruguay |
Scoring by quarter: 28–33, 16–19, 21–11, 25–21
| Pts: Barrett 22; Rebs: Guarasci, Young 6 Asts: Nash 6 | | Pts: Owens 22; Rebs: Owens, Szczygielski 6 Asts: Owens 5 |

Roberto Clemente Coliseum, San Juan

August 23
7:30 p.m.

Boxscore

| Mexico | 70–92 | Puerto Rico |
Scoring by quarter: 10–24, 21–18, 21–24, 18–26
| Pts: Quintero 24; Rebs: Benítez 10; Asts: Nájera 6 | | Pts: Casiano 19; Rebs: Ortiz 9 Asts: Santiago 5 |

Roberto Clemente Coliseum, San Juan

August 24
2:30 p.m.

Boxscore

| Canada | 108–72 | Mexico |
Scoring by quarter: 31–27, 32–18, 30–18, 15–9
| Pts: Barrett 27; Rebs: Kwiatkowski 5 Asts: Nash 7 | | Pts: Quintero 27; Rebs: Parada 6 Asts: Mariscal 4 |

Roberto Clemente Coliseum, San Juan

August 24
7:30 p.m.

Boxscore

| Puerto Rico | 80–85 | Argentina |
Scoring by quarter: 20–16, 12–28, 20–21, 28–20
| Pts: Arroyo 22; Rebs: Santiago 9 Asts: Hourruitiner 4 | | Pts: Ginóbili, Wolkowyski 16; Rebs: Montecchia 7 Asts: Ginóbili 10 |

Roberto Clemente Coliseum, San Juan

=== Group B ===
| Team | Pld | W | L | PF | PA | PD | Pts |
|---|---|---|---|---|---|---|---|
| United States | 4 | 4 | 0 | 432 | 273 | +159 | 8 |
| Brazil | 4 | 3 | 1 | 376 | 345 | +31 | 7 |
| Dominican Republic | 4 | 2 | 2 | 292 | 356 | −64 | 6 |
| Venezuela | 4 | 1 | 3 | 321 | 356 | −35 | 5 |
| Virgin Islands | 4 | 0 | 4 | 278 | 369 | −91 | 4 |

August 20
5:00 p.m.

Boxscore

| Venezuela | 76–78 | Dominican Republic |
Scoring by quarter: 19–17, 14–25, 17–24, 26–12
| Pts: Torres 17; Rebs: Torres 8 Asts: Aguilera, Díaz, Julio, Torres 2 | | Pts: Western 25; Rebs: Vargas 14; Asts: Ramírez 4 |

Roberto Clemente Coliseum, San Juan

August 20
10:00 p.m.

Boxscore

| United States | 110–76 | Brazil |
Scoring by quarter: 23–29, 26–18, 31–8, 30–21
| Pts: Brand, Duncan 17; Rebs: Brand, Duncan 6 Asts: Bibby 7 | | Pts: Nenê 17; Rebs: Nenê 9 Asts: da Silva 4 |

Roberto Clemente Coliseum, San Juan

August 21
7:30 p.m.

Boxscore

| Brazil | 100–74 | Virgin Islands |
Scoring by quarter: 23–21, 20–16, 25–18, 31–19
| Pts: Giovannoni 18; Rebs: Splitter 11; Asts: Varejão 4 | | Pts: Sheppard 18; Rebs: Victor 7 Asts: Sheppard 6 |

Roberto Clemente Coliseum, San Juan

August 21
10:00 p.m.

Boxscore

| United States | 111–73 | Dominican Republic |
Scoring by quarter: 29–25, 31–11, 28–18, 23–19
| Pts: McGrady 17; Rebs: O'Neal 7 Asts: Kidd 10 | | Pts: Filion 18; Rebs: Filion 6 Asts: Ramírez 6 |

Roberto Clemente Coliseum, San Juan

August 22
7:30 p.m.

Boxscore

| Virgin Islands | 65–69 | Dominican Republic |
Scoring by quarter: 17–16, 15–18, 14–13, 19–22
| Pts: Heywood 21; Rebs: Heywood 13; Asts: Richards 3 | | Pts: Western 18; Rebs: Peterson 8 Asts: Ortega 4 |

Roberto Clemente Coliseum, San Juan

August 22
10:00 p.m.

Boxscore

| Venezuela | 68–98 | United States |
Scoring by quarter: 11–26, 24–26, 24–25, 10–21
| Pts: Díaz 16; Rebs: Aguilera 6 Asts: Aguilera, R. Guevara, Mijares, Morris 2 | | Pts: McGrady 16; Rebs: Duncan 13; Asts: Iverson 7 |

Roberto Clemente Coliseum, San Juan

August 23
5:00 p.m.

Boxscore

| Virgin Islands | 55–113 | United States |
Scoring by quarter: 19–26, 13–34, 16–30, 7–23
| Pts: Heywood 13; Rebs: Richards 9 Asts: Richards 2 | | Pts: Iverson 17; Rebs: Martin 13; Asts: Iverson 10 |

Roberto Clemente Coliseum, San Juan

August 23
10:00 p.m.

Boxscore

| Venezuela | 89–96 | Brazil |
Scoring by quarter: 23–31, 17–21, 25–20, 24–24
| Pts: Díaz 24; Rebs: Torres 9 Asts: Julio 4 | | Pts: Machado 20; Rebs: Splitter 8 Asts: da Silva 10 |

Roberto Clemente Coliseum, San Juan

August 24
5:00 p.m.

Boxscore

| Venezuela | 87–84 | Virgin Islands |
Scoring by quarter: 20–25, 28–20, 21–16, 18–23
| Pts: Díaz 27; Rebs: Torres, Julio 6 Asts: D. Guevara 5 | | Pts: Sheppard 24; Rebs: Richards 13; Asts: Richards 7 |

Roberto Clemente Coliseum, San Juan

August 24
10:00 p.m.

Boxscore

| Dominican Republic | 72–104 | Brazil |
Scoring by quarter: 10–29, 16–29, 23–21, 23–25
| Pts: Filion 35; Rebs: Peterson 8 Asts: Filion, Ramírez 4 | | Pts: Barbosa 22; Rebs: de Souza, Nenê 8 Asts: Varejão 5 |

Roberto Clemente Coliseum, San Juan

== Quarterfinal group ==
| Qualified for the semifinals |

The top four teams in both Group A and Group B advanced to the quarterfinal group. Then each team played the four from the other group once to complete a full round robin. Records from the preliminary groups carried over. The top four teams advanced to the semifinals.

| Team | Pld | W | L | PF | PA | PD | Pts | Tie |
|---|---|---|---|---|---|---|---|---|
| United States | 8 | 8 | 0 | 824 | 564 | +260 | 16 | |
| Argentina | 8 | 5 | 3 | 715 | 658 | +57 | 13 | 2–0 |
| Canada | 8 | 5 | 3 | 713 | 705 | +8 | 13 | 1–1 |
| Puerto Rico | 8 | 5 | 3 | 657 | 603 | +54 | 13 | 0–2 |
| Venezuela | 8 | 4 | 4 | 668 | 713 | −45 | 12 | 1–0 |
| Mexico | 8 | 4 | 4 | 679 | 734 | −55 | 12 | 0–1 |
| Brazil | 8 | 3 | 5 | 709 | 696 | +13 | 11 | |
| Dominican Republic | 8 | 2 | 6 | 591 | 730 | −139 | 10 | |

August 25
2:30 p.m.

Boxscore

| Mexico | 100–91 | Dominican Republic |
Scoring by quarter: 27–20, 22–14, 24–22, 27–35
| Pts: Llamas, Mariscal, Quintero 21; Rebs: Benítez 14; Asts: Quintero 6 | | Pts: Peralta 17; Rebs: Vargas 7 Asts: Filion, Lalane, Ortega, Ramírez 3 |

Roberto Clemente Coliseum, San Juan

August 25
5:00 p.m.

Boxscore

| Argentina | 76–74 | Brazil |
Scoring by quarter: 25–19, 17–19, 17–18, 17–18
| Pts: Nocioni, Oberto 14; Rebs: Sánchez, Oberto, Wolkowyski 6 Asts: Ginóbili, Oberto 4 | | Pts: Varejão 17; Rebs: Nenê 11; Asts: 5 players 2 |

Roberto Clemente Coliseum, San Juan]

August 25
7:30 p.m.

Boxscore

| Puerto Rico | 84–59 | Venezuela |
Scoring by quarter: 17–15, 10–9, 30–21, 27–14
| Pts: Ayuso 19; Rebs: Latimer 7 Asts: Arroyo 10 | | Pts: Torres 13; Rebs: Aguilera 14; Asts: R. Guevara 4 |

Roberto Clemente Coliseum, San Juan

August 25
10:00 p.m.

Boxscore

| Canada | 71–111 | United States |
Scoring by quarter: 28–21, 11–30, 20–31, 12–29
| Pts: Barrett 15; Rebs: Kwiatkowski, Newton 7 Asts: Nash 5 | | Pts: Iverson 28; Rebs: Martin 7 Asts: Bibby 9 |

Roberto Clemente Coliseum, San Juan

August 26

Boxscore

| Venezuela | 98–95 | Mexico |
Scoring by quarter: 32–35, 26–20, 17–20, 23–20
| Pts: Díaz 26; Rebs: Blanco 7 Asts: Blanco, Díaz 6 | | Pts: Quintero 28; Rebs: Zúñiga 14; Asts: Nájera 6 |

Roberto Clemente Coliseum, San Juan

August 26
5:00 p.m.

Boxscore

| United States | 94–86 | Argentina |
Scoring by quarter: 27–23, 17–17, 26–25, 24–21
| Pts: O'Neal 22; Rebs: O'Neal 10; Asts: Kidd 7 | | Pts: Oberto 17; Rebs: Nocioni 6 Asts: Sánchez 5 |

Roberto Clemente Coliseum, San Juan

August 26
7:30 p.m.

Boxscore

| Dominican Republic | 61–94 | Puerto Rico |
Scoring by quarter: 17–29, 8–18, 13–20, 23–27
| Pts: Filion 15; Rebs: Peterson, Pichardo 6 Asts: Filion 3 | | Pts: Latimer 22; Rebs: Latimer 12; Asts: Hatton 5 |

Roberto Clemente Coliseum, San Juan

August 26
10:00 p.m.

Boxscore

| Brazil | 97–101 | Canada |
Scoring by quarter: 33–29, 30–35, 20–21, 14–16
| Pts: Machado 39; Rebs: Nenê, Varejão 9 Asts: Varejão 6 | | Pts: Nash 24; Rebs: Swords 7 Asts: Nash 9 |

Roberto Clemente Coliseum, San Juan

August 27
2:30 p.m.

Boxscore

| Canada | 78–75 | Dominican Republic |
Scoring by quarter: 17–18, 24–23, 14–17, 23–17
| Pts: Brown 16; Rebs: Brown, Kwiatkowski, Young 6 Asts: Nash 8 | | Pts: Vargas 17; Rebs: Vargas 10; Asts: Ortega 5 |

Roberto Clemente Coliseum, San Juan

August 27
5:00 p.m.

Boxscore

| Argentina | 92–97 | Venezuela |
Scoring by quarter: 24–15, 22–23, 27–23, 19–36
| Pts: Nocioni 17; Rebs: Kammerichs 6 Asts: Sánchez 6 | | Pts: Torres 20; Rebs: Marriaga 7 Asts: R. Guevara 6 |

Roberto Clemente Coliseum, San Juan

August 27
7:30 p.m.

Boxscore

| Puerto Rico | 72–70 | Brazil |
Scoring by quarter: 18–17, 20–24, 16–19, 18–10
| Pts: Ayuso 19; Rebs: Ortiz 7 Asts: Sánchez 6 | | Pts: Nenê 15; Rebs: Nenê 14; Asts: da Silva 7 |

Roberto Clemente Coliseum, San Juan

August 27
10:00 p.m.

Boxscore

| Mexico | 69–96 | United States |
Scoring by quarter: 26–19, 14–30, 11–21, 18–26
| Pts: Quintero 21; Rebs: Benítez 10; Asts: Llamas 4 | | Pts: Duncan 16; Rebs: O'Neal 7 Asts: Carter 5 |

Roberto Clemente Coliseum, San Juan

August 28
2:30 p.m.

Boxscore

| Venezuela | 93–86 (OT) | Canada |
Scoring by quarter: 36–23, 18–12, 14–24, 11–20, Overtime: 14–7
| Pts: Díaz 23; Rebs: Marriaga 9 Asts: D. Guevara 8 | | Pts: Brown, Karangwa 20; Rebs: Brown 8 Asts: Nash, Thomas 3 |

Roberto Clemente Coliseum, San Juan

August 28
5:00 p.m.

Boxscore

| Brazil | 92–102 | Mexico |
Scoring by quarter: 20–25, 25–21, 21–31, 26–25
| Pts: Nenê 26; Rebs: Nenê 14; Asts: Ferraciú, Giovannoni, Pinto 3 | | Pts: Quintero 23; Rebs: Benítez 12; Asts: Quintero 5 |

Roberto Clemente Coliseum, San Juan

August 28
7:30 p.m.

Boxscore

| Dominican Republic | 72–102 | Argentina |
Scoring by quarter: 18–25, 13–24, 13–28, 28–25
| Pts: Western 17; Rebs: Filion 7 Asts: Ortega 4 | | Pts: Ginóbili, Scola 18; Rebs: Ginóbili, Kammerichs 5 Asts: Sánchez 7 |

Roberto Clemente Coliseum, San Juan

August 28
10:00 p.m.

Boxscore

| United States | 91–65 | Puerto Rico |
Scoring by quarter: 22–20, 23–16, 19–12, 27–17
| Pts: Duncan 16; Rebs: Duncan, O'Neal 9 Asts: Duncan 4 | | Pts: Fajardo 19; Rebs: Fajardo, Latimer, Rivera 6 Asts: Arroyo 4 |

Roberto Clemente Coliseum, San Juan

== Knockout stage ==
Semi-finals
August 30, 2003 – 20:00
Argentina | 88
Canada | 72
August 30, 2003 – 22:00
United States | 87
Puerto Rico | 71

Final
August 31, 2003 – 22:00
Argentina | 73
United States | 106
Third place
August 31, 2003 – 20:00
Canada | 66
Puerto Rico | 79

=== Semifinals ===
August 30
8:00 p.m.

Boxscore

| Argentina | 88–72 | Canada |
Scoring by quarter: 26–20, 25–14, 24–10, 13–28
| Pts: Ginóbili 26; Rebs: Wolkowyski, Scola 5 Asts: Ginóbili, Montecchia, Sánchez 4 | | Pts: Brown 13; Rebs: Guarasci 6 Asts: Nash 4 |

Roberto Clemente Coliseum, San Juan

August 30
10:00 p.m.

Boxscore

| United States | 87–71 | Puerto Rico |
Scoring by quarter: 26–17, 23–20, 22–16, 16–18
| Pts: Allen 15; Rebs: O'Neal 10; Asts: McGrady 6 | | Pts: Fajardo 14; Rebs: Fajardo 7 Asts: Arroyo 5 |

Roberto Clemente Coliseum, San Juan

=== Third place game ===
August 31
8:00 p.m.

Boxscore

| Canada | 66–79 | Puerto Rico |
Scoring by quarter: 13–24, 17–20, 17–22, 19–13
| Pts: Barrett 18; Rebs: Newton 9 Asts: Nash 7 | | Pts: Ortiz 21; Rebs: Santiago 11; Asts: Ortiz 10 |

Roberto Clemente Coliseum, San Juan

=== Final ===
August 31
10:00 p.m.

Boxscore

| United States | 106–73 | Argentina |
Scoring by quarter: 35–15, 25–12, 23–20, 23–26
| Pts: Duncan 23; Rebs: Duncan 14; Asts: Bibby 7 | | Pts: Ginóbili, Victoriano 16; Rebs: Kammerichs 6 Asts: Victoriano 4 |

Roberto Clemente Coliseum, San Juan

== Awards ==
- Topscorer: (Mexico) Omar Quintero 169 pts

2003 Tournament of the Americas winners

United States
Fifth title

Most Valuable Player
(Canada) Steve Nash

== Statistical leaders ==
=== Individual Tournament Highs ===
Points

| Pos. | Name | PPG |
|---|---|---|
| 1 | (Mexico) Omar Quintero | 21.1 |
| 2 | (Venezuela) Víctor Díaz | 19.1 |
| 3 | (Canada) Rowan Barrett | 18.1 |
| 4 | (United States) Tim Duncan | 15.6 |
| 5 | (Dominican Republic) Franklin Western | 14.6 |
| 6 | (Mexico) Eduardo Nájera | 14.5 |
| 7 | (United States) Allen Iverson | 14.3 |
| 7 | (Venezuela) Óscar Torres | 14.3 |
| 9 | (Argentina) Manu Ginóbili | 14.1 |
| 10 | (Brazil) Nenê | 13.3 |

Rebounds

| Pos. | Name | RPG |
|---|---|---|
| 1 | (Brazil) Nenê | 9.1 |
| 2 | (United States) Tim Duncan | 8.0 |
| 3 | (Mexico) Jesus Benítez | 7.9 |
| 4 | (Mexico) Eduardo Nájera | 6.7 |
| 5 | (Puerto Rico) José Ortiz | 6.3 |
| 6 | (Canada) Greg Newton | 6.2 |
| 6 | (United States) Jermaine O'Neal | 6.2 |
| 8 | (Venezuela) Óscar Torres | 6.0 |
| 8 | (Dominican Republic) José Vargas | 6.0 |
| 10 | (Dominican Republic) Jaime Peterson | 5.7 |

Assists

| Pos. | Name | APG |
|---|---|---|
| 1 | (Canada) Steve Nash | 6.6 |
| 2 | (United States) Jason Kidd | 5.0 |
| 3 | (United States) Mike Bibby | 4.8 |
| 4 | (Puerto Rico) Carlos Arroyo | 4.7 |
| 5 | (Argentina) Manu Ginóbili | 4.4 |
| 6 | (Argentina) Juan Ignacio Sánchez | 3.8 |
| 6 | (United States) Allen Iverson | 3.8 |
| 8 | (Puerto Rico) José Ortiz | 3.5 |
| 8 | (Mexico) Eduardo Nájera | 3.5 |
| 10 | (United States) Tim Duncan | 3.4 |
| 10 | (Brazil) Válter da Silva | 3.4 |

Steals

| Pos. | Name | SPG |
|---|---|---|
| 1 | (Mexico) Omar Quintero | 1.9 |
| 2 | (Venezuela) Óscar Torres | 1.8 |
| 3 | (Puerto Rico) Larry Ayuso | 1.6 |
| 3 | (United States) Allen Iverson | 1.6 |
| 3 | (Dominican Republic) Franklin Western | 1.6 |
| 6 | (United States) Mike Bibby | 1.5 |
| 6 | (Argentina) Luis Scola | 1.5 |
| 7 | (Brazil) Marcelinho Machado | 1.5 |
| 7 | (Brazil) Anderson Varejão | 1.5 |
| 10 | (Mexico) Eduardo Nájera | 1.5 |

Blocks

| Pos. | Name | BPG |
|---|---|---|
| 1 | (Puerto Rico) José Ortiz | 2.1 |
| 1 | (Brazil) Anderson Varejão | 2.1 |
| 3 | (United States) Tim Duncan | 1.6 |
| 4 | (Dominican Republic) Jaime Peterson | 1.3 |
| 5 | (United States) Jermaine O'Neal | 1.2 |
| 5 | (Brazil) Nenê | 1.1 |
| 7 | (Puerto Rico) Daniel Santiago | 1.0 |
| 8 | (United States) Kenyon Martin | 0.9 |
| 8 | (Venezuela) Rosmel Blanco | 0.9 |
| 10 | (Brazil) Tiago Splitter | 0.8 |

Minutes

| Pos. | Name | MPG |
|---|---|---|
| 1 | (Mexico) Omar Quintero | 33.3 |
| 2 | (Venezuela) Víctor Díaz | 30.5 |
| 2 | (Mexico) Víctor Mariscal | 30.5 |
| 4 | (Puerto Rico) Carlos Arroyo | 29.7 |
| 5 | (Mexico) Horacio Llamas | 28.0 |
| 6 | (Dominican Republic) Franklin Western | 27.8 |
| 7 | (Mexico) Eduardo Nájera | 27.7 |
| 7 | (Venezuela) Luis Julio | 27.3 |
| 9 | (Brazil) Nenê | 27.0 |
| 10 | (Argentina) Manu Ginóbili | 26.2 |

=== Individual Game Highs ===
| Department | Name | Total | Opponent |
|---|---|---|---|
| Points | (Brazil) Marcelinho Machado | 39 | Canada |
| Rebounds | 8 Players | 14 | |
| Assists | 7 Players | 10 | |
| Steals | (United States) Mike Bibby (Mexico) Eduardo Nájera | 5 | Virgin Islands; Venezuela |
| Blocks | (Puerto Rico) José Ortiz | 7 | Canada |
| Turnovers | (United States) Allen Iverson | 8 | Venezuela |

=== Team Tournament Highs ===
Offensive PPG

| Pos. | Name | PPG |
|---|---|---|
| 1 | United States | 101.7 |
| 2 | Brazil | 88.6 |
| 3 | Argentina | 87.6 |
| 4 | Canada | 85.1 |
| 5 | Mexico | 84.9 |

Defensive PPG

| Pos. | Name | PPG |
|---|---|---|
| 1 | United States | 70.8 |
| 2 | Puerto Rico | 75.6 |
| 3 | Argentina | 83.6 |
| 4 | Brazil | 87.0 |
| 5 | Canada | 87.2 |

Rebounds

| Pos. | Name | RPG |
|---|---|---|
| 1 | Virgin Islands | 39.2 |
| 2 | United States | 38.8 |
| 2 | Mexico | 37.5 |
| 4 | Brazil | 36.5 |
| 5 | Puerto Rico | 35.7 |

Assists

| Pos. | Name | APG |
|---|---|---|
| 1 | United States | 29.3 |
| 2 | Argentina | 21.8 |
| 3 | Puerto Rico | 20.4 |
| 4 | Brazil | 19.9 |
| 5 | Venezuela | 18.5 |

Steals

| Pos. | Name | SPG |
|---|---|---|
| 1 | United States | 10.1 |
| 2 | Argentina | 9.7 |
| 3 | Brazil | 8.5 |
| 4 | Venezuela | 8.4 |
| 5 | Canada | 7.3 |

Blocks

| Pos. | Name | BPG |
|---|---|---|
| 1 | United States | 5.5 |
| 2 | Puerto Rico | 4.9 |
| 3 | Brazil | 4.4 |
| 4 | Virgin Islands | 3.0 |
| 5 | Dominican Republic | 2.8 |

=== Team Game highs ===
| Department | Name | Total | Opponent |
|---|---|---|---|
| Points | United States | 113 | Virgin Islands |
| Rebounds | Virgin Islands | 53 | Dominican Republic |
| Assists | Brazil | 26 | Canada |
| Steals | United States | 40 | Canada |
| Blocks | Argentina; Puerto Rico; United States | 9 | Puerto Rico; Canada; Dominican Republic |
| Field goal percentage | United States (2 times) | 65.6% | Virgin Islands; Canada |
| 3-point field goal percentage | United States | 77.8% | Canada |
| Free throw percentage | Argentina | 93.3% | Venezuela |
| Turnovers | Brazil; Dominican Republic | 25 | United States; Argentina |

== Final standings ==
| Qualified for the 2004 Summer Olympics |

| Rank | Team | Record |
|---|---|---|
| 1st place, gold medalist(s) | United States | 10–0 |
| 2nd place, silver medalist(s) | Argentina | 6–4 |
| 3rd place, bronze medalist(s) | Puerto Rico | 6–4 |
| 4 | Canada | 5–5 |
| 5 | Venezuela | 4–4 |
| 6 | Mexico | 4–4 |
| 7 | Brazil | 3–5 |
| 8 | Dominican Republic | 2–6 |
| 9 | Uruguay | 0–4 |
| 10 | Virgin Islands | 0–4 |

| 1st | 2nd | 3rd | 4th |
| United States Allen Iverson; Jason Kidd; Tracy McGrady; Jermaine O'Neal; Vince Carter; Nick Collison; Mike Bibby; Kenyon Martin; Ray Allen; Tim Duncan; Elton Brand; Richard Jefferson | Argentina Juan Ignacio Sánchez; Manu Ginóbili; Alejandro Montecchia; Fabricio Oberto; Lucas Victoriano; Gabriel Fernández; Leonardo Gutiérrez; Luis Scola; Federico Kammerichs; Andrés Nocioni; Leandro Palladino; Rubén Wolkowyski | Puerto Rico José Ortiz; Eddie Casiano; Bobby Joe Hatton; Carlos Arroyo; Rick Apodaca; Raymond Dalmau; Larry Ayuso; Antonio Latimer; Rolando Hourruitiner; Sharif Fajardo; Jorge Rivera; Daniel Santiago | Canada Novell Thomas; Denham Brown; Prosper Karangwa; Steve Nash; Shawn Swords; Rowan Barrett; Greg Francis; Andrew Kwiatkowski; Jesse Young; Peter Guarasci; Michael King; Greg Newton |
