= Carlos Zesati =

Mexican basketball player (born 1994)

No. 11 – Gambusinos de Fresnillo
- Position: Small forward
- League: Liga Nacional de Baloncesto Profesional

Personal information
- Born: 20 June 1994 (age 32) Monterrey, Nuevo León, Mexico
- Listed height: 6 ft 9 in (2.06 m)
- Listed weight: 207 lb (94 kg)

Career information
- College: Universidad Regiomontana
- Playing career: 2015–present

Career history
- 2015: Vaqueros de Agua Prieta
- 2015: Lobos UAD Mazatlán
- 2015: Halcones Rojos Veracruz
- 2016: Zonkeys de Tijuana
- 2016: Garzas Guerreras UATX
- 2017: Libertadores de Querétaro
- 2018: Ángeles de Puebla
- 2019: Plateros de Fresnillo
- 2019: Aguacateros de Michoacán
- 2019: Fuerza Regia de Monterrey
- 2020: Leñadores de Durango
- 2021–2022: Pioneros de Los Mochis
- 2021: Abejas de León
- 2022: Mineros de Zacatecas
- 2023: Pergamino Basquet
- 2023: Correbasket UAT
- 2024: El Calor de Cancún
- 2025–present: Gambusinos de Fresnillo
- 2026: Indios de Ciudad Juárez

José Carlos Zesati Espinoza (born 20 June 1994) is a Mexican professional basketball player.

== Career ==
Reyna made his debut in the 2015 season with the Vaqueros de Agua Prieta to play in the CIBACOPA, later he played with Pioneros de Los Mochis. He has played with Aguacateros de Michoacán, Halcones Rojos Veracruz, Fuerza Regia de Monterrey, El Calor de Cancún and Gambusinos de Fresnillo in the LNBP. He played with Indios de Ciudad Juárez, Soles de Ojinaga and Pioneros de Delicias in the LBE. On 2023, he was confirmed as a reinforcement for Pergamino Basquet in the Liga Nacional de Básquet.

== National team career ==
In 2024, he was a member of the preliminary list of the Mexican national team that participated in the 2024 FIBA Men's Olympic Qualifying Tournaments.
