= La Ola Roja del Distrito Federal =

Mexican basketball team

- League: LNBP
- Established: 2000
- Folded: 2007
- Arena: Gimnasio Olímpico Juan de la Barrera
- Location: Mexico City, Mexico
- Team colors: red, white, blue
- President: Armando Baraldi

The Club Deportivo La Ola del Distrito Federal, also known simply as La Ola or La Ola Roja (the red wave) were a professional basketball team based in Mexico City. The team participated in the first edition of the Liga Nacional de Baloncesto Profesional in 2000, and reached the championship game in 2003, losing to Panteras de Aguascalientes.

== History ==
The team was founded in 2000. The first coach was Francisco Ramírez, and the first import players were Americans Richard Cannon and Sean Wright. The first season in 2000 saw the team end the regular season with a losing record, 10–30. Nevertheless, the team was admitted to the playoffs, where they faced Osos de Saltillo. Richard Cannon and Mexican Rafael Sandoval were selected in the first LNBP All-Star Game in 2000.

In 2001 the new coach was Héctor Macías Calleja; he was later replaced by José Bravo Roblés. The import players for the season were Americans Mark Body, Richard Cannon and Jeff Clifton. The team ended the 2001 LNBP season with an 18–26 record; players Daniel Macías, Rafael Sandoval (Mexicans) and Jeff Clifton (Import) were selected for the All-Star Game. Clifton also ranked third in the league in scoring at 24.4 points per game.

In 2002 Luis Fernando Wong had his first stint as a coach; the team signed Jermaine Tate, who had played college basketball at Ohio State and Cincinnati. The team ended the season in 7th place with a 22–22 record. For the 2003 season the imports were American Eric Martin, Nakiea Miller and Jermaine Tate; the coach was Argentinian Daniel Maffei. Tate was later replaced by Senegalese center Boubacar Aw. The team ended the regular season in 4th place, with a 28–20 record. La Ola Roja reached the championship games, where they lost to Panteras de Aguascalientes.

In the 2004 season, La Ola were put in the Zona Sur (South Zone), one of the two groups in which the LNBP teams were separated. In that season, players Javier González Rex (Mexican) and Boubacar Aw (Import) were selected as All-Stars. The team also signed former Los Angeles Lakers small forward Alex Blackwell. The team, coached by Luis Fernando Wong, who had returned to the club in June 2004, finished with a 24–16 record. The team ended in the 7th place in the 2005 LNBP season. In 2006, La Ola ended in the 11th place. The 2006 season was the last one played by La Ola, which stopped participating in the LNBP and ceased operations in 2007.

== Season-by-season records ==
Year	Wins	Losses	Winning percentage	Head coach	Ref
2000	10	30	.333	(Mexico) Francisco Ramírez	
2001	18	26	.450	(Mexico) Héctor Macías, then (Mexico) José Bravo Roblés	
2002	22	22	.500	(Mexico) Luis Fernando Wong	
2003	28	20	.583	(Argentina) Daniel Maffei	
2004	24	16	.600	(Mexico) Luis Fernando Wong	
2005	23	17	.575	(Mexico) Luis Fernando Wong	
2006	20	14	.588	(Uruguay) Alberto Espasandín	
