= Trahson Burrell =

American basketball player (born 1992)

No. 45 – Ángeles de la Ciudad de México
- Position: Small forward
- League: CIBACOPA

Personal information
- Born: November 16, 1992 (age 33) Albany, New York, U.S.
- Listed height: 6 ft 7 in (2.01 m)
- Listed weight: 190 lb (86 kg)

Career information
- High school: Bishop Maginn (Albany, New York); St. Thomas More (Oakdale, Connecticut); Summit Christian (East Lansing, Michigan)
- College: Lee (2012–2014); Memphis (2014–2016)
- NBA draft: 2016: undrafted
- Playing career: 2016–present

Career history
- 2016–2017: Long Island Nets
- 2017–2018: Memphis Hustle
- 2018: Maccabi Haifa
- 2018–2020: Texas Legends
- 2021: Syracuse Stallions
- 2021–2022: Edmonton Stingers
- 2022: Libertadores de Querétaro
- 2026–present: Ángeles de la Ciudad de México

Trahson Burrell (born November 16, 1992) is an American professional basketball player for Libertadores de Querétaro of the Liga Nacional de Baloncesto Profesional (LNBP). He played college basketball for Lee College and the Memphis Tigers.

== Early life and high school career ==
Burrell was born and grew up in Albany, New York and initially attended Bishop Maginn High School. Following his sophomore year, Burrell transferred to the St. Thomas More School in Oakdale, Connecticut and to Summit Christian Academy in East Lansing, Michigan for his senior year.

== College career ==
=== Lee ===
Burrell began his collegiate career at Lee College. As a sophomore, Burrell averaged 25.2 points (3rd-highest in the NJCAA), 7.5 rebounds and 5.6 assists per game and was ranked as one of the top junior college recruits in his class. He ultimately committed to Memphis to continue his college career.

=== Memphis ===
Burrell spent his final two seasons of college eligibility playing for the Memphis Tigers. As a junior, he averaged 9.1 points, 5.2 rebounds and 1.9 assists per game. As a senior, Burrell averaged 10 points, 6.2 rebounds, and 2.7 assists per game.

== Professional career ==
=== Long Island Nets ===
Burrell was selected with the 14th pick in the 2nd round of the 2016 NBA Development League draft by the Long Island Nets. In his first professional season, Burrell averaged 13.1 points, 6.8 rebounds, 3.3 assists and 1.39 steals per game in 49 games (36 starts). He also participated in the Slam Dunk Contest at the 2017 D-League All-Star Game.

=== Memphis Hustle ===
The Nets traded Burrell to the Memphis Hustle before the start of the 2017–18 NBA G League season. He averaged 13.3 points and 8.5 rebounds per game in 32 games with the Hustle before being waived on February 8, 2018.

=== Maccabi Haifa ===
Burrell signed with Maccabi Haifa B.C. of the Israeli Basketball Premier League on April 5, 2018. He averaged 2.8 points and 2.8 rebounds over four games.

=== Texas Legends ===
Burrell was selected by the Texas Legends out of the G-League available player pool on December 3, 2018. Burrell was suspended twice during the 2018–19 NBA G League season, receiving a three-game suspension in February due to a postgame altercation and missing another in March due to his involvement in an on-court altercation. Burrell averaged 7.1 points, 4.1 rebounds, and 1.7 assists in 27 games, all off the bench, for the Legends. Following his performance with the Legends Burrell was named to the Dallas Maverick's Summer League roster. Burrell was waived by the Legends on February 13, 2020.

=== Edmonton Stingers ===
Burrell joined the Edmonton Stingers for the 2021–22 BCL Americas. He led the Edmonton Stingers to the club's first international victory against Nicaraguan club Real Estelí on December 13, 2021.
