= Gimnasio Nico Varela =

Arena in Zacatecas, Mexico

- Location: Fresnillo, Zacatecas, Mexico
- Capacity: 4,500

Construction
- Opened: 1994
- Renovated: 2025

Tenants
- Gambusinos de Fresnillo (LNBP) (2002–2007) (2025–present); Plateros de Fresnillo (LNBP) (2019–2024); Plateras de Fresnillo (LNBPF) (2022–2023)

The Gimnasio Nico Varela is an arena in Fresnillo, Mexico. The arena was opened on 1994 it was named due to the renowned basketball-playing player Nicolás Varela. The arena is the home venue of the Gambusinos de Fresnillo.
