= Elian Villafañe =

Argentine basketball coach (born 1991)

Gambusinos de Fresnillo
- Position: Head coach
- League: LNBP

Personal information
- Born: 27 May 1991 (age 35) San Francisco, Córdoba, Argentina
- Coaching career: 2013–present

Career history

Coaching
- 2013–2017: Reserve teams of Atenas
- 2017–2018: Atenas (Assistant)
- 2019–2022: Club Atlético Barrio Parque
- 2022–2023: Fuerza Regia de Monterrey (Assistant)
- 2023–2024: Veltex Shizuoka (Assistant)
- 2024–2025: Diablos Rojos del México (Assistant)
- 2026: Rayos de Hermosillo
- 2026–present: Gambusinos de Fresnillo

Elian Villafañe (born 27 May 1991) is an Argentine basketball coach. He is the head coach of the Rayos de Hermosillo.

== Coaching career ==
Villafañe started his coaching career in 2013 as part of the reserve teams of Atenas. In 2019 he was appointed as head coach of Club Atlético Barrio Parque. From 2024 to 2025 he was part of the staff of Diablos Rojos del México, the team won the champioship in th 2024 season. On 2026, he signed with Rayos de Hermosillo of CIBACOPA.
