= Jorge Rivera (basketball) =

Puerto Rican basketball player

Medal record

Representing Puerto Rico

Men's basketball

FIBA AmeriCup
Bronze medal – third place	2003 San Juan	

Centrobasket
Gold medal – first place	2003 Culiacan	
Silver medal – second place	2004 Santo Domingo	

Pan American Games
Bronze medal – third place	2003 Santo Domingo	

Jorge Rivera (born December 9, 1973) is a former basketball player from San Juan, Puerto Rico. He played for Puerto Rico on the BSN for the Santurce Crabbers and was a member of the 2004 Puerto Rican National Basketball Team that competed at the 2004 Athens Olympics.
