= Boubacar Aw =

Senegalese basketball player

Personal information
- Born: June 22, 1975 (age 51) Thiès, Senegal
- Listed height: 6 ft 7 in (2.01 m)
- Listed weight: 228 lb (103 kg)

Career information
- High school: East Columbus (Lake Waccamaw, North Carolina)
- College: Georgetown (1994–1998)
- NBA draft: 1998: undrafted
- Playing career: 1998–2008
- Position: Power forward / center

Career history
- 1998–2000: Belgrano de San Nicolás
- 2000: Gimnasia La Plata
- 2000–2001: Belgrano de San Nicolás
- 2001–2002: Regatas San Nicolás
- 2003: La Ola Roja del Distrito Federal
- 2004: Universidad Católica
- 2004: Quilmes
- 2004: La Ola Roja del Distrito Federal
- 2004–2005: Estudiantes de Olavarría
- 2005: Fuerza Guinda de Nogales
- 2006–2007: La Ola Roja del Distrito Federal
- 2007–2008: Pioneros de Quintana Roo

Career highlights
- 3× LNBP All-Star (2004, 2005, 2006)
Medals
Men's basketball
Representing Senegal
FIBA Africa Championship
Gold medal – first place	1997 Dakar	Team competition

Boubacar Richard Aw (born June 22, 1975) is a Senegalese former professional basketball player. After growing up in Thiès, Aw moved to the United States in 1993 and he played high school basketball in Lake Waccamaw, North Carolina; he then went on to play 4 years in college at Georgetown. After graduating from college, Aw had a 10-year professional career in Central and South America. He was also a member of the Senegalese national basketball team, with which he won the gold medal during the 1997 FIBA Africa Championship and participated in the 1998 FIBA World Championship. After retiring from playing basketball, Aw has become a teacher and youth basketball coach.

== High school career ==
Aw was born in Thiès, Senegal into a numerous family: his father had three wives, and Aw had 19 half-siblings. Growing up in Senegal he spoke French and Wolof. He played soccer in his childhood, but when he became significantly taller than his peers he turned to basketball, playing at US Rail in Thiès. During a youth basketball tournament, Aw met Craig Esherick, who at the time was an assistant coach at Georgetown, and was invited to move to the United States to attend Georgetown. Helped by John Jacques, a basketball player from Delco, North Carolina who was playing at Georgetown, Aw moved to the United States in 1993, being hosted by Gary Battle, a teacher and basketball coach at East Columbus High School in Lake Waccamaw, North Carolina. Aw did not know English when he arrived in the US, but he nevertheless graduated from high school in one year, and in 1993–94 he was named All Columbus Basketball Player of the Year.

== College career ==
Aw signed to play for Georgetown in 1994. There he found another Senegalese player, Cheikh Yaya Dia, who was a sophomore in 1994–95. In his first season at Georgetown under coach John Thompson, Aw played 30 games, playing as a backup forward. He was the 6th best rebounder (2.5) and the 8th best scorer (4 points per game) on the team in his freshman year, and had his highest-scoring performance with 17 points against UConn on February 14, 1995.

In his sophomore season, coach Thompson promoted Aw to a starting role, alongside Jerome Williams. That season, two more African players joined Georgetown: Nigerian Godwin Owinje and Cameroonian Joseph Touomou, bringing the total of African players in the team roster to 4 (Aw, Dia, Owinje and Touomou). Aw started 37 games during the season, with his best performance coming again against UConn on February 19, 1996 (11 points and 5 rebounds). He averaged 4.5 points and 3 rebounds, playing 18.8 minutes per game, and participated in the 1996 NCAA tournament, during which Georgetown reached the Elite Eight, where they lost to UMass. During the NCAA Tournament, Aw scored a tournament-high 8 points against Texas Tech on March 21, after posting 6 rebounds against New Mexico on March 17.

As a junior, Aw had a more relevant role in the team, following the graduation of seniors Othella Harrington and Jerome Williams. He started all 30 games, playing 20.7 minutes, and had a season high 16 points, along with 9 rebounds, in the March 14, 1997 game against Charlotte during the 1997 NCAA tournament. Aw saw an improvement in his offensive contribution, increasing his scoring average to 7.4 points per game, and was the third-best rebounder on the team with 5 per game (behind Dia and Jahidi White); he also shot a career-high 53.9% from the field.

In his senior season, Aw was named team captain. On January 20, 1998 Aw posted new career highs with 21 points and 18 rebounds against Seton Hall. He then recorded a new career high in scoring with 24 points on February 17, 1998 against Pittsburgh. Aw's senior season was marked by increased offensive assignments, due to injuries to Jahidi White and freshman Cameroonian center Ruben Boumtje-Boumtje, and Aw had career-highs in points (11.4, second on the team behind Shernard Long) and rebounds (6.2, second behind White).

=== College statistics ===
Year	Team	GP	GS	MPG	FG%	3P%	FT%	RPG	APG	SPG	BPG	PPG
1994–95	Georgetown	30	0	16.1	.522	.000	.581	2.5	0.9	0.8	0.1	4.0
1995–96	Georgetown	37	37	18.8	.507	.000	.417	3.0	1.1	1.2	0.3	4.5
1996–97	Georgetown	30	30	20.7	.539	.000	.544	5.0	1.2	1.3	0.3	7.4
1997–98	Georgetown	31	31	27.4	.516	.000	.550	6.2	1.0	1.0	0.3	11.4
Career		128	98	20.7	.521	.000	.532	4.1	1.0	1.1	0.3	6.7

== Professional career ==
After his senior season at Georgetown, Aw was automatically eligible for the 1998 NBA draft, but he was not selected by an NBA franchise. In December 1998 he signed a professional contract for Belgrano de San Nicolás of the Argentine Liga Nacional de Básquet. In his first season as a professional, Aw averaged 20 points and 5.8 rebounds while shooting 58% from the field over 32 games (35.4 minutes per game). He stayed with Belgrano also for the following season, during which he posted averages of 18.5 points and 6 rebounds per game, with a 65% field goal percentage. In 2000 he played for Gimnasia La Plata in the Torneo Nacional de Ascenso, the second tier of Argentine basketball, and averaged 19.8 points and 6.2 rebounds per game. He then went back to Belgrano for the 2000–01 season, playing 24 games (18.1 points, 5.9 rebounds per game).

In 2001 he joined Regatas San Nicolás, another LNB team, and he appeared in 32 league games, averaging 17.3 points and 5.4 rebounds in 34.8 minutes of playing time. In 2003 he moved to Mexico for the first time in his career, and signed for La Ola Roja del Distrito Federal, a team of Mexico City which played in the Liga Nacional de Baloncesto Profesional, participating in the 2003 season. In early 2004 he left to join Chilean club Universidad Católica, participating in the 2004 Liga Sudamericana de Básquetbol during which he averaged 22.3 points, 4.7 rebounds and 2.7 assists per game. In February 2004 he signed for Quilmes, playing 23 games (13.1 points, 6.7 rebounds) in the Argentine LNB.

After playing another season in Mexico with Ola Roja in 2004, and earned an all-star selection. He then signed for Estudiantes de Olavarría in late December 2004, and played 9 games in Argentina (18.3 points, 5.6 rebounds) before leaving the team in February 2005. Later that year he signed for Fuerza Guinda de Nogales, a Mexican team that participated in the CIBACOPA, averaging 22.7 points per game.

In 2006 he signed again for Ola Roja, taking part in the 2006 LNBP season and receiving an All-Star selection. Aw then spent the 2007–08 LNBP season with Pioneros de Quintana Roo, with which he also played in the 2008–09 FIBA Americas League (14.5 points, 5.5 rebounds per game).

== National team career ==
With the Senegalese national team, Aw was part of the squad that won the gold medal at the 1997 FIBA Africa Championship. He then took part in the 1998 FIBA World Championship, playing 5 games averaging 5 points, 2.4 rebounds and 1.8 blocks: he scored 10 points against Italy and South Korea. According to Senegalese press agency Agence de Presse Sénégalaise, Aw and teammate Cheikh Yaya Dia did not accept any call-up from the national team after 1998.
