= Bobby Joe Hatton =

Puerto Rican basketball player

Personal information
- Born: 11 October 1976 (age 50) Ponce, Puerto Rico
- Listed height: 6 ft 2 in (1.88 m)
- Listed weight: 175 lb (79 kg; 12.5 st)

Career information
- High school: Colegio Ponceño
- College: Marist (1995–1999)
- NBA draft: 1999: undrafted
- Playing career: 1994–2012
- Position: Point guard

Career history
- 1994–2000: Atléticos de San Germán
- 2000–2001: Correcaminos UAT Victoria
- 2001–2004: Leones de Ponce
- 2004–2005: CAB Madeira
- 2005: Leones de Ponce
- 2005: Strasbourg
- 2005–2006: Spartak Saint Petersburg
- 2006–2007: Leones de Ponce
- 2008: Capitanes de Arecibo
- 2008–2009: Halcones Rojos Veracruz
- 2009–2012: Leones de Ponce

Career highlights
- BSN Most Valuable Player (2005); 5× BSN Champion (1994, 1997, 2002, 2004, 2008); 2× LNBP All-Star (2000, 2001); Second-team All-MAAC (1999)
Medals
Men's basketball
Representing Puerto Rico
FIBA AmeriCup
Bronze medal – third place	2003 Puerto Rico
Centrobasket
Gold medal – first place	2003 Mexico
Silver medal – second place	2004 Dominican Republic
Bronze medal – third place	2006 Panama

Roberto José Hatton Negrón (born 11 October 1976) is a Puerto Rican professional basketball player. Hatton has most notably played for Marist College in the NCAA and for the Arecibo Captains, San Germán Athletics, and Ponce Lions in Puerto Rico's Baloncesto Superior Nacional. Hatton has also played professionally in Portugal, Russia, Mexico and France. Hatton has been a member of the Puerto Rico national basketball team since 1993, taking part in both the 2004 Olympic Games, famous for their defeat of the United States team, as well as the 2006 FIBA World Championship. At the youth level he won a silver medal at the 1997 FIBA Under-22 World Championship.

His #10 jersey was retired by his former team Leones de Ponce in 2017.
