= Alex Blackwell (basketball) =

American basketball player (born 1970)

Personal information
- Born: June 27, 1970 (age 56) Toms River, New Jersey, U.S.
- Listed height: 6 ft 6 in (1.98 m)
- Listed weight: 250 lb (113 kg)

Career information
- High school: Toms River High School North (Toms River, New Jersey); Oak Hill Academy (Mouth of Wilson, Virginia)
- College: Monmouth (1989–1992)
- NBA draft: 1992: undrafted
- Playing career: 1992–2009
- Position: Small forward
- Number: 30

Career history
- 1992–1993: Los Angeles Lakers
- 1993: Trabzonspor
- 1993–1995: Omaha Racers
- 1995–1996: Connecticut Pride
- 1996: Connecticut Skyhawks
- 1996: Santeros de Aguada
- 1996: Rockford Lightning
- 1996–1997: Yakima Sun Kings
- 1997: Fort Wayne Fury
- 1997: Avancinos de Villalba
- 1997–1998: Andino
- 1998: CB Murcia
- 1998–1999: Andino
- 1999: Cangrejeros de Santurce
- 1999: Welcome
- 2000: Guaiqueríes de Margarita
- 2000: Vaqueros de Bayamón
- 2000: Cangrejeros de Santurce
- 2000–2001: Los Barrios
- 2001: Guaiqueríes de Margarita
- 2001: Rosalía de Castro
- 2002: Guaiqueríes de Margarita
- 2002: Club San Carlos
- 2003–2004: Paisas de Medellín
- 2004: Trotamundos de Carabobo
- 2004: La Ola Roja del Distrito Federal
- 2004: Comunal Ancud
- 2004–2005: Libertad de Sunchales
- 2005–2007: Uberlândia
- 2007–2008: Club Malvín
- 2008: Guruyu Watson
- 2008–2009: Español de Talca
- 2009: Universidad de Los Lagos

Career highlights
- All-CBA Second Team (1996)
- Stats at NBA.com
- Stats at Basketball Reference
Medals
Men's basketball
Representing United States
Summer Universiade
| Gold medal – first place | 1991 Sheffield | National team |

Robert Alexander Blackwell (born June 27, 1970) is an American former professional basketball player, who had a brief stint with the Los Angeles Lakers of the NBA. A 6'6", 250 lb forward born in Toms River, New Jersey, he attended Monmouth College (now Monmouth University) in West Long Branch, New Jersey.

Raised in Toms River, New Jersey, Blackwell played at Toms River High School North before transferring to Oak Hill Academy for his senior year.

During the 1992–93 NBA season, Blackwell was used sparingly by the Lakers, playing 27 games, averaging 1.3 points and 0.9 rebounds per game.

Blackwell played in the Continental Basketball Association (CBA) for the Omaha Racers, Connecticut Pride, Fort Wayne Fury, Rockford Lightning and Yakima Sun Kings from 1993 to 1997. He was selected to the All-CBA Second Team in 1996.
