= Amaury Filion =

Dominican basketball player

Personal information
- Born: August 1, 1981 (age 45) Santiago de los Caballeros, Dominican Republic
- Listed height: 2.06 m (6 ft 9 in)
- Listed weight: 103 kg (227 lb)

Career information
- High school: Artesia (Lakewood, California)
- NBA draft: 2003: undrafted
- Playing career: 1997–2017
- Position: Power forward / center

Career history
- 1997: Mauricio Báez
- 2000: Mauricio Báez
- 2001–2002: Cupes de Los Pepines
- 2002: Metros de Santiago
- 2002–2003: Cupes de Los Pepines
- 2003: Gallitos de Isabela
- 2003–2004: JA Vichy
- 2004: Criollos de Caguas
- 2005: Sameji
- 2005: Metros de Santiago
- 2006: Sameji
- 2006: Metros de Santiago
- 2006–2007: Guaiqueríes de Margarita
- 2007: Don Bosco
- 2007: Metros de Santiago
- 2008: Club San Sebastián
- 2008: Bohemios
- 2008: Metros de Santiago
- 2009: San Martín de Porres
- 2009: Don Bosco
- 2009: Sameji
- 2010: Huellas del Siglo
- 2010: Metros de Santiago
- 2011: Club San Sebastián
- 2011: Metros de Santiago
- 2012: Guaiqueríes de Margarita
- 2013: Indios de San Francisco de Macorís
- 2014: José Horacio Rodríguez
- 2014–2015: Sameji
- 2016: Metros de Santiago
- 2016–2017: Sameji
- 2017: Metros de Santiago

Career highlights
- 2× LIDOBA champion (2006–2007); LIDOBA Finals MVP (2007); Liga Profesional de Baloncesto champion (2007)
Medals
Men's basketball
Representing Dominican Republic
Pan American Games
Silver medal – second place	2003 Dominican Republic
Centrobasket
Gold medal – first place	2004 Santo Domingo
Silver medal – second place	2003 Culiacán

Amaury Apolinar Filion Fernández (born August 1, 1981) is a Dominican former professional basketball player. A left-handed 2.06 m (6 ft 9 in) forward-center, Filion debuted in 1997 with Mauricio Báez, a club of Santo Domingo. He then moved to the United States, where he played at Artesia High School in Lakewood, California before going back to the Dominican Republic. Throughout his 20-year professional career, Filion has played in the Dominican Republic, France, Puerto Rico, Uruguay and Venezuela; in 2007 he was named the LIDOBA Finals MVP. A long-time member of the Dominican national team, he won the silver medal at the 2003 Pan American Games and the gold medal at the 2004 Centrobasket.

== High school career ==
Filion moved to the United States in 1998, and enrolled at Artesia High School in Lakewood, California; at the time, he was known as Apolinar Fernández, i.e. with his middle name and his mother's surname, which were part of his full name in accordance to the naming customs of Hispanic America. Filion was highly recruited in high school, and he participated in the 1999 ABCD Camp, where he was named the Underclassmen co-MVP together with T. J. Ford. In 2000, he was named the CIF Division II co-Player of the Year together with Marques Crane of Ocean View High School. While in high school he played alongside Jason Kapono and fellow Dominican Jack Michael Martínez.

In early 2000, it was reported that Filion, together with teammates Martínez and Jon Steffenson, were to leave Artesia due to issues with their immigration documents submitted to the Immigration and Naturalization Service. Artesia was put under investigation. Filion ended up going back to the Dominican Republic, where he signed with Mauricio Báez, a local professional team.

== Professional career ==
Filion had started his career in 1997 with Mauricio Báez, a club of Santo Domingo which participated in the Baloncesto Superior del Distrito Nacional, the basketball league for clubs of the Distrito Nacional. From 1998 to early 2000, he was in the United States with Artesia High School; he then returned to the Dominican Republic and played again for Mauricio Báez, winning the Distrito Nacional league title. In 2001 and 2002 he played for Cupes de Los Pepines, a club of the Baloncesto Superior de Santiago, the local league for teams of the Santiago de los Caballeros area; in 2002 he also played with Metros de Santiago, and was named one of the league's best players.

In 2003 he initially played with Cupes de Los Pepines, and then moved to Puerto Rico, signing for Gallitos de Isabela: in the 2003 season he appeared in 19 games and averaged 17.8 points, 7.2 rebounds and 1.8 assists in the Baloncesto Superior Nacional. In late 2003 he signed for JA Vichy of the LNB Pro A, the top level of basketball in France: he played 8 games (5 starts), averaging 8.4 points, 5 rebounds and 1.1 assists in 23.5 minutes of playing time.

In 2004 he went back to Puerto Rico and signed with Criollos de Caguas, another BSN team, and averaged 11.5 points, 4.9 rebounds and 0.9 assists in 18 games. In 2005 he played for Sameji in the Baloncesto Superior de Santiago, winning the league title and being named in the All-Star team; he scored 23 points in the 7th and final game of the championship series against Club Domingo Paulino. He later played with Metros de Santiago in the first edition of the LIDOBA, the Dominican national basketball league, and averaged 15.5 points, 8.7 rebounds, 3.6 steals and 1.8 blocks per game.

In 2006 he played the first part of the season with Sameji, and repeated as Baloncesto Superior de Santiago league champion; he then played in the LIDOBA with Metros de Santiago. In 2007 he played for Don Bosco of the Asociación de Baloncesto de Espaillat (ASOBAE), and then for Guaiqueríes de Margarita in the Venezuelan Liga Profesional de Baloncesto (LPB), winning the league title.

In 2008 he played for San Sebastián in the ASOBAE, and then moved to Uruguay where he played in the Liga Uruguaya de Básquetbol (LUB) with Bohemios. In 2009 he spent the season with San Martín de Porres in San Francisco de Macorís, Don Bosco in the ASOBAE, and Sameji in the Baloncesto Superior de Santiago. In 2010 he played for Huellas del Siglo, and was league champion in the Distrito Nacional. He also played with Metros de Santiago, later in 2010.

In 2011 he spent part of the season with San Sebastián, before going back to Metros de Santiago. In 2012 he returned to Venezuela, signing again for Guaiqueríes de Margarita. In 2013 he played for Indios de San Francisco de Macorís, and in 2014 he played for Club José Horacio Rodríguez in the ASOBAE. He then played for Sameji in the Baloncesto Superior de Santiago; in 2016, he participated in the 2016 FIBA Americas League with Metros de Santiago. He ended his career in 2017 with Metros de Santiago.

== National team career ==
Filion debuted with the Dominican national team at youth level, and was one of the best players of his team during the 2001 FIBA Under-21 World Championship in Saitama, Japan: he averaged 15.1 points, 3 rebounds and 1.4 assists per game. The Dominican Republic Under-21 team ended the tournament in 4th place. He then made his debut with the senior national team in 2003 and played during the 2003 Centrobasket, averaging 7 points and 3.7 rebounds per game, winning the silver medal. Filion was then called up with the national team for the 2003 Pan American Games in early August; during the competition he averaged 12.1 points, 4 rebounds and 1.9 assists per game, and the Dominican Republic won the silver medal. Later that month, Filion participated with his team in the 2003 Tournament of the Americas, where he had an 18-point, 6-rebound performance against the United States, and a 15-point performance against Puerto Rico.

Filion took part in the 2004 Centrobasket averaging 12.6 points, 6 rebounds and 2.6 assists; he won the gold medal in the tournament. In 2005 he was part of the Dominican squad at the 2005 FIBA Americas Championship, where he found limited playing time and averaged 3.9 points and 1.9 rebounds per game. He then appeared in the 2006 Centrobasket, posting averages of 5.6 points and 2.2 rebounds. In 2010 he again appeared during the Centrobasket. In 2014 he was called up for the Central American and Caribbean Games, where he averaged 1 point and 0.5 rebounds per game.
