= Gimnasio Olímpico Juan de la Barrera =

Indorr arena in Mexico City, Mexico

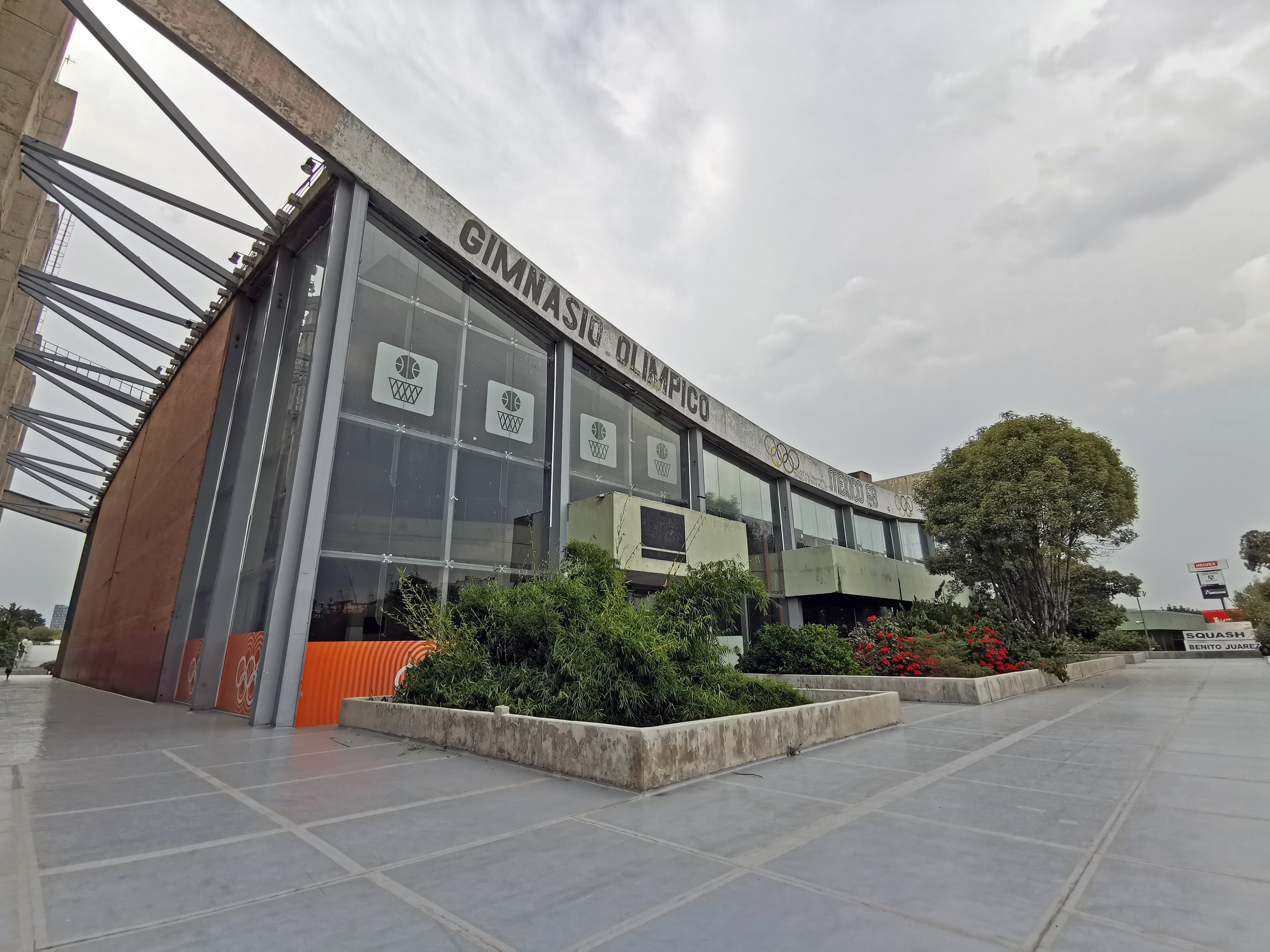
- The gymnasium in 2021

- Location within Mexico
- Address: Av. Division del Nte. 2333
- Location: Mexico City
- Coordinates: 19°21′36″N 99°09′17″W
- Owner: Mexico City
- Operator: LNBP; CIBACOPA; AAA
- Capacity: 5,242 (basketball)
- Surface: Multi-surface
- Field size: 11,152 m^{2}

Construction
- Groundbreaking: August 24, 1967
- Opened: October 12, 1968
- Architect: Manuel Rossen Morrison
- Structural engineer: E. Gutiérrez Bringas

Tenants
- La Ola Roja del Distrito Federal (LNBP) (2000–2007); Capitanes de la Ciudad de México (LNBP) (2017–2020); Ángeles de la Ciudad de México (CIBACOPA) (2023–present); Diablos Rojos del México (LNBP) (2024–present)

The Gimnasio Olímpico Juan de la Barrera is an indoor arena located in Mexico City, Mexico. At the 1968 Summer Olympics, it hosted the volleyball competitions, and it is located next to the Olympic pool. It was the home of La Ola Roja del Distrito Federal of the LNBP from 2000 to 2007 and the professional basketball team Capitanes de la Ciudad de México from 2017 to 2020. The arena seats 5,242 people in two stand levels. For years, it has been the traditional home of professional basketball in Mexico City.
