= Reggie Jordan =

American basketball player and coach (born 1968)

Personal information
- Born: January 26, 1968 (age 58) Chicago, Illinois, U.S.
- Listed height: 6 ft 4 in (1.93 m)
- Listed weight: 195 lb (88 kg)

Career information
- High school: Proviso East (Maywood, Illinois)
- College: Southwestern College (1987–1989); New Mexico State (1989–1991)
- NBA draft: 1991: undrafted
- Playing career: 1991–2010
- Position: Point guard / shooting guard
- Number: 23, 22, 31, 10

Career history

Playing
- 1991–1993: Grand Rapids Hoops
- 1994: Los Angeles Lakers
- 1994–1995: Yakima Sun Kings
- 1995: Apollon Patras B.C.
- 1995–1996: Sioux Falls Skyforce
- 1996: Atlanta Hawks
- 1996–1997: Portland Trail Blazers
- 1997–1999: Minnesota Timberwolves
- 1999–2000: Washington Wizards
- 2000–2001: Chicago Skyliners
- 2001–2002: Dafnis B.C.
- 2002–2003: Rockford Lightning
- 2003–2004: Las Vegas Rattlers
- 2004–2005: Michigan Mayhem
- 2005: Lechugueros de León
- 2005–2006: Cometas de Querétaro
- 2007–2008: Halcones Rojos Veracruz
- 2008–2009: Lobos UAdeC Saltillo
- 2009: Rayos de Hermosillo
- 2009–2010: Lobos Grises UAD

Coaching
- 2010–2012: Fuerza Regia
- 2010–2012: Fuerza Regia de Monterrey
- 2022–present: Ensenada Lobos (assistant)

Career highlights
- 4× LNBP All-Star (2003–2006); CIBACOPA All-Star (2009); CBA champion (1995); All-CBA First Team (1996); CBA All-Defensive Team (1996); CBA steals leader (1996); First-team All-Big West (1991)
- Stats at NBA.com
- Stats at Basketball Reference
Medals
Men's basketball
Representing United States
FIBA Americas Championship
Gold medal – first place	1993 San Juan	Team competition
Gold medal – first place	1997 Montevideo	Team competition

Reginald Jordan (born January 26, 1968) is an American former professional basketball player and coach. Born in Chicago, he attended Proviso East High School, in Maywood, Illinois. The 6-foot-4-inch (1.93 m), 195-pound (88 kg) guard went to Southwestern Junior College, and then to New Mexico State University. Jordan was never drafted by an NBA team but played in the Continental Basketball Association (CBA) and won 2 championships with the Yakima Sun Kings and the Sioux Falls Skyforce. Jordan also played in Greece's top league for 2 seasons 1994–95, 2002. Jordan also managed to play in 6 NBA seasons from 1993 to 1994 and from 1996 to 2000. He played for the Los Angeles Lakers, Atlanta Hawks, Portland Trail Blazers, Minnesota Timberwolves and Washington Wizards. In the CBA, he also played for the Grand Rapids Hoops and Rockford Lightning.

In his NBA career, Jordan played in 186 games. On February 3, 1994, in his fifth NBA game, Jordan scored a career-high 28 points for the Lakers versus the Utah Jazz while on a 10-day contract. Jordan was selected to the All-CBA First Team and All-Defensive Team in 1996. He was part of the inaugural roster of the Rayos de Hermosillo in 2009. Jordan finished his professional career playing five seasons in Mexico before retiring in May 2010.

Jordan served as the head coach of the Fuerza Regia de Monterrey from 2010 to 2012. Afterwards, he served as a basketball trainer in Chicago. In 2022, he was hired as an assistant coach for the Ensenada Lobos of the Circuito de Baloncesto del Pacífico (CIBAPAC).
