= Libertadores de Querétaro =

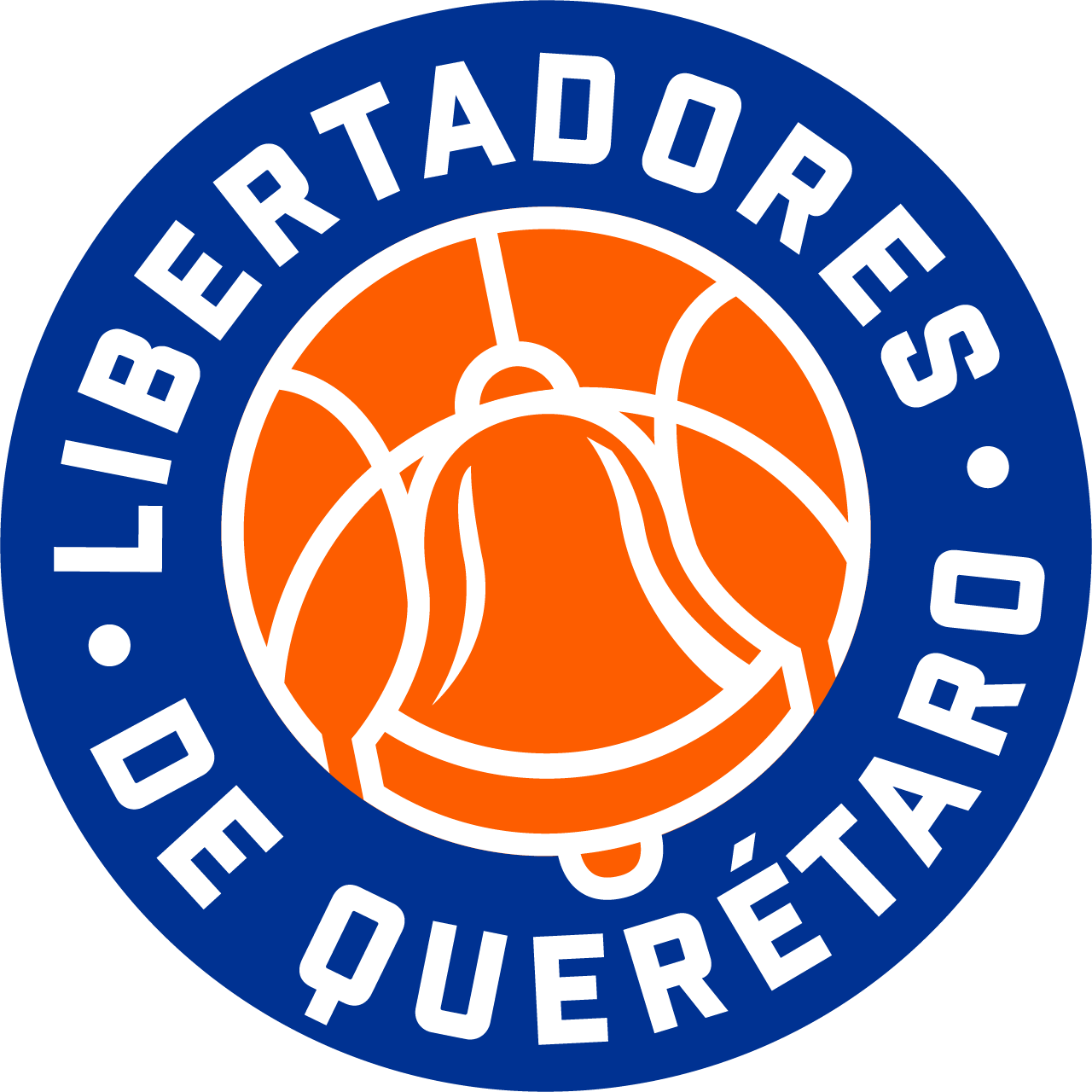
- Conference: West
- League: LNBP
- Founded: 2009
- Dissolved: 29 February 2024; 2 years ago
- History: Libertadores de Querétaro (2009–2010, 2017–present)
- Arena: Auditorio General Arteaga
- Capacity: 2,982
- Location: Querétaro City, Querétaro, Mexico
- Team colors: Blue, white, orange
- President: Roberto Alvarado
- Head coach: Iván Déniz
- Ownership: Grupo Xoy Capital
- Championships: 0
- Website: libertadores.mx
Home	Away	Third

Libertadores de Querétaro (English: Querétaro Liberators) was a professional Mexican basketball team, based in Querétaro City, Querétaro. The Libertadores were part of the Liga Nacional de Baloncesto Profesional, the top professional basketball league in Mexico. The team plays their home games at the Auditorio General Arteaga, with a capacity of 4,139 spectators.

Libertadores was established in 2009 and joined Liga Nacional de Baloncesto Profesional for the 2009–10 season, but it folded after the end of the season. The team came back for the 2017–18 season.

== History ==
Libertadores de Querétaro was founded in 2009 and they joined the top-level of Mexican basketball, the Liga Nacional de Baloncesto Profesional, for the 2009–10 season. The team decided not to participate for the next season due to financial problems, allegedly, because the State's government decided to end their monetary support to the team.

In 2017, after six years of absence, the team announced their return to professional basketball for the 2017–18 season. Amongst the team's plans for their comeback to the LNBP was a renovation of the Auditorio General Arteaga.

== Players ==
=== Current roster ===
Note: Flags indicate national team eligibility at FIBA-sanctioned events. Players may hold other non-FIBA nationalities not displayed.

Libertadores de Querétaro roster
Players
Coaches

Pos.	No.	Nat.	Name	Ht.	Wt.
G	0	(United States)	Frazier, Branden	1.91 m (6 ft 3 in)	80 kg (176 lb)
PF	3	(Colombia)	Palacios, Juan	2.06 m (6 ft 9 in)	110 kg (243 lb)
PG	4	(Mexico)	Stoll, Paul	1.80 m (5 ft 11 in)	80 kg (176 lb)
G	7	(Mexico)	Gutiérrez, Jorge	1.91 m (6 ft 3 in)	88 kg (194 lb)
G	9	(Mexico)	Willis, Diego	1.93 m (6 ft 4 in)	80 kg (176 lb)
PF	12	(Mexico)	Hernández, Héctor	2.06 m (6 ft 9 in)	102 kg (225 lb)
C	20	(Cuba)	Justiz, Javier	2.10 m (6 ft 11 in)	120 kg (265 lb)
SG	24	(Mexico)	Girón, Gabriel	1.92 m (6 ft 4 in)	90 kg (198 lb)
F	31	(Mexico)	Avila, J. J.	2.03 m (6 ft 8 in)	113 kg (249 lb)
C	44	(Mexico)	Amigo, Daniel	2.08 m (6 ft 10 in)	111 kg (245 lb)
G/F	45	(United States)	Burrell, Trahson	2.01 m (6 ft 7 in)	86 kg (190 lb)
G	55	(United States)	Spencer, Bo	1.85 m (6 ft 1 in)	86 kg (190 lb)

Head coach

- (Spain) Iván Déniz

Assistant coach(es)

- (Spain) Xavi Monferrer
- (Mexico) Christopher Silva

Legend

- (C) Team captain
- (I) Import player
- Injured

- Roster
Updated: March 1, 2023

Pos.	Starting 5	Bench 1	Bench 2
C	Daniel Amigo	Juan Palacios	Javier Justiz
PF	J. J. Avila	Héctor Hernández
SF	Gabriel Girón	Trahson Burrell
SG	Branden Frazier	Diego Willis
PG	Paul Stoll	Jorge Gutiérrez	Bo Spencer

=== Notable players ===
Note: Flags indicate national team eligibility at FIBA-sanctioned events. Players may hold other non-FIBA nationalities not displayed.

Criteria

To appear in this section a player must have either:

- Set a club record or won an individual award while at the club
- Played at least one official international match for their national team at any time
- Played at least one official NBA match at any time.

- (Mexico) Jorge Gutiérrez
- (United States) Jordan Adams
- (United States) Anthony Roberson
