= Juárez Gallos de Pelea =

Mexican professional minor league basketball team

- Founded: 2000
- Location: Juarez, Mexico

The Juarez Gallos de Pelea are a Mexican basketball team that has competed in various leagues in the United States and Mexico since 2000. The team won a Liga Nacional de Baloncesto Profesional championship in 2001.

In 2003-2004, the Juarez Gallos were a Mexican franchise in the American Basketball Association (finishing in third place with an 18 win, 12 loss record), but left the league the following year (many sources show the team with an official record of zero wins, zero losses in the final 2004-2005 league standings). In 2007, the team joined the Texas Pro Basketball League.
