= Omar Quintero =

Mexican basketball player (born 1981)

Mexico
- Position: Head Coach

Personal information
- Born: 26 September 1981 (age 45) Nogales, Sonora, Mexico
- Listed height: 6 ft 0 in (1.83 m)
- Listed weight: 185 lb (84 kg)

Career information
- College: Southern Nazarene (2002–2003)
- Playing career: 2002–2017

Career history

Coaching
- 2017–2018: Aguacateros de Michoacán (assistant)
- 2018–2019: Aguacateros de Michoacán
- 2019–2020: Huracanes de Tampico
- 2020–2023: Libertadores de Querétaro
- 2021–: Mexico

Career highlights
- 2× CIBACOPA champion (2014, 2017); 6× LNBP All-Star (2000–2004, 2006); FIBA AmeriCup Top Scorer (2003)
Medals
Men's basketball
Representing Mexico
Pan American Games
Silver medal – second place	2011 Guadalajara
Centrobasket
Bronze medal – third place	2003 Culiacán
FIBA COCABA Championship
Gold medal – first place	2009 Cancún

Omar Quintero Pereda (born 26 September 1981) is a Mexican professional basketball coach and former player. He played the point guard position for teams in Mexico, Spain, Italy, Venezuela, and Puerto Rico. He also played for the Dallas Mavericks in the NBA Summer League. Quintero represented the Mexico national basketball team, winning several international medals.

Quintero has coached the Mexico men's national team since 2021.

== Early life and college career ==
A native of Nogales, Sonora, Quintero started playing basketball at the age of nine with his older brother Gustavo. He attended the Autonomous University of Tamaulipas (UAT), where he played basketball for the Correcaminos UAT and set the Mexican collegiate record by scoring 87 points in a single game.

Quintero attended one year of college (2002–03) in the United States, with NAIA school Southern Nazarene University, where he played with the Crimson Storm. Quintero averaged a school record and conference-leading 24.1 points per game for Southern Nazarene. He turned pro after one season at the school, playing for Fuerza Guinda de Nogales in Mexico.

== Professional career ==
In addition to playing for local teams in Mexico, Quintero's pro career has also taken him to the Spanish Liga ACB and Venezuelan League. He was the first Mexican to play in the Liga ACB. In the 2004–05 season, he played in the EuroLeague with Spanish side TAU Ceramica, scoring nine points in two games off the bench for the team. He played under head coach Aleksandar Petrović in 2006 with Fabriano Basket, later calling him the best coach of his career. In 2008, he played in the BSN league of Puerto Rico, with Cariduros de Fajardo. In 2009, he played with Gigantes de Guayana of the Venezuelan League.

Quintero played with the Huracanes de Tampico from 2009 to 2014.

Quintero announced his retirement from professional basketball in December 2017, accepting a position on the coaching staff of the Aguacateros de Michoacán as an assistant coach.

== National team career ==
Quintero was long-time a member of the senior Mexico national basketball team. He was the leading overall scorer at the 2003 FIBA AmeriCup, averaging 21.1 points per game, and the sixth overall scorer, with an average of 18.5 points per game, at the 2005 FIBA AmeriCup.

== Coaching career ==
After one season as an assistant coach for the Aguacateros de Michoacán, Quintero was promoted to head coach in December 2018.

In June 2019, he was announced as the new head coach of the Huracanes de Tampico.

Quintero was hired as the head coach of the Libertadores de Querétaro in January 2020.

In February 2021, Quintero was announced as the new head coach of the Mexico men's national basketball team.
