= Santos del Potosí =

Professional basketball team

- Nickname: Santos, Los Celestiales
- League: LNBP
- Founded: 1969 57 years
- History: Santos de San Luis; 1969–2003; Santos Reales de San Luis; 2003–2009; C.B. Santos San Luis; 2015–2019; Santos del Potosí; 2023–present
- Arena: Auditorio Miguel Barragán
- Capacity: 3,400
- Location: San Luis Potosí City, San Luis Potosí, Mexico
- Team colors: Green, gold, white
- President: Juan Carlos Jiménez Rivera
- Head coach: Doug Plumb
- 2025 LNBP position: 12th
- Championships: CIMEBA: 3 (1971-1972), (1980), (1997-1998); LNBP: 1 (2004)
- Website: Santos
Home	Away	Third

The Santos del Potosí (English: San Luis Saints) are a Mexican professional basketball team based in San Luis Potosi City, that participates in the top Mexican league, the Liga Nacional de Baloncesto Profesional (LNBP).

== History ==
They started in 1969, when entrepreneurs from San Luis Potosí decided to create a professional basketball team, not just to participate in the Circuito Mexicano de Básquetbol (CIMEBA), to become one of the best teams in the country.

Their beginning was rather shaky, but shortly thereafter they found a winning strategy and gameplay, which was then seen in their results. The Santos were always among the best teams in CIMEBA, and in the 1971-1972 season they achieved their first national championship.

The second national championship came in 1980 and, after the season finished, three players were selected to be part of the national team. The third championship was obtained in the 1997-1998 season.

The team's most important achievement was in the 2004 season, now playing in the Liga Nacional de Baloncesto Profesional (LNBP), when they were crowned after winning against the Halcones UV Xalapa and took the trophy back to San Luis Potosí.

Another memorable match was away from home court in 2004, between Los Santos Reales and Fuerza Regia de Monterrey, the latter having Dennis Rodman in their team. The Santos Reales won the match with a score 95-84.

At 2009, due to economic issues, the team was forced to leave every professional sport competition.

At 2015, with a new administration and more financial support, the team returned to the LNBP to play the 2015-2016 season, but under the new name of C.B. Santos San Luis.

At 2020, due to the absence of people at the stadium, consequence of the COVID-19 pandemic, the team decided not to participate in the 2020 LNBP season, hoping to return for the next one.

In July 2023, the return to the LNBP was announced, now under the name of Santos del Potosí.

== Stadium ==
C.B. Santos San Luis team plays its local game at the Auditorio Miguel Barragán, located in San Luis Potosi City. This indoor court is available to admit 3,400 spectators.

== Players ==
=== Current roster ===
Note: Flags indicate national team eligibility at FIBA-sanctioned events. Players may hold other non-FIBA nationalities not displayed.

Santos del Potosí roster
Players
Coaches

Pos.	No.	Nat.	Name	Ht.	Wt.
PG	1	(Mexico)	García, Luis	1.93 m (6 ft 4 in)	93 kg (205 lb)
PG	3	(United States)	Mart, Rayshawn	1.91 m (6 ft 3 in)	86 kg (190 lb)
PG	4	(United States)	White, Jahlil	2.01 m (6 ft 7 in)	101 kg (223 lb)
PG	9	(Mexico)	Diego, Astudillo	1.88 m (6 ft 2 in)	88 kg (194 lb)
PG	10	(United States)	Calloway, Jacob	2.03 m (6 ft 8 in)	98 kg (216 lb)
PG	13	(Syria)	Coleman, Javion	1.92 m (6 ft 4 in)	92 kg (203 lb)
F	15	(Mexico)	Vázquez, Jesús	2.00 m (6 ft 7 in)	100 kg (220 lb)
PG	19	(United States)	Harrison, Andrew	1.98 m (6 ft 6 in)	97 kg (214 lb)
PG	20	(Mexico)	Barriga, Alejandro
SG	23	(United States)	Anthony, Marco	1.93 m (6 ft 4 in)	93 kg (205 lb)
SF	25	(United States)	Ramirez, Juan	1.93 m (6 ft 4 in)	89 kg (196 lb)
PF	32	(United States)	Ward, Nick	2.06 m (6 ft 9 in)	111 kg (245 lb)
C	33	(United States)	Vogt, Chris	2.13 m (7 ft 0 in)	113 kg (249 lb)

Head coach

- (Canada) Doug Plumb

Assistant coach(es)

- (Canada) Juan Mendez
- (United States) Bobby Gonzalez

Legend

- (C) Team captain
- Injured

- Roster
Updated: August 17, 2026

=== Notable players ===
Note: Flags indicate national team eligibility at FIBA-sanctioned events. Players may hold other non-FIBA nationalities not displayed.

Criteria

To appear in this section a player must have either:

- Set a club record or won an individual award while at the club
- Played at least one official international match for their national team at any time
- Played at least one official NBA match at any time.

- (Mexico) Irwin Ávalos
- (Mexico) Omar Quintero
- (Mexico) Diego Willis
- (United States) Gabe Pruitt
