= Gambusinos de Fresnillo =

- League: LNBP
- Founded: 2002; 24 years ago
- History: Gambusinos de Fresnillo (2002–)
- Arena: Gimnasio Nico Varela
- Capacity: 4,500
- Location: Fresnillo, Zacatecas
- Team colors: Midnight blue, violet, hot pink
- President: Miguel Ángel Romo
- Head coach: Elian Villafañe
Home	Away

Gambusinos de Fresnillo (English: Fresnillo Miners) is a Mexican professional basketball team based in Fresnillo, Zacatecas. The Gambusinos are part Liga Nacional de Baloncesto Profesional, the top professional basketball league in Mexico. The team play their home games at the Gimnasio Nico Varela, with a capacity of 4,500 spectators.

== History ==
The Gambusinos de Fresnillo were originally formed as a team in the Circuito Mexicano de Básquetbol. In 2002, they joined the Liga Nacional de Baloncesto Profesional (LNBP), where they remained until 2007. That year, before the new season began, they were merged with the Barreteros de Zacatecas to form Unión Zacatecas. Their return to the LNBP was announced in 2011, but it ultimately did not happen. They finally announced their return in the 2025 season taking the spot of Plateros de Fresnillo.

== Players ==
=== Current roster ===
Note: Flags indicate national team eligibility at FIBA-sanctioned events. Players may hold other non-FIBA nationalities not displayed.

Gambusinos de Fresnillo roster
Players
Coaches

Pos.	No.	Nat.	Name	Ht.	Wt.
SG	2	(United States)	Cooper, Thomas	1.96 m (6 ft 5 in)	91 kg (201 lb)
SG	3	(Argentina)	González, Luciano	1.88 m (6 ft 2 in)	78 kg (172 lb)
PG	4	(Mexico)	Argomaníz, Miguel	1.85 m (6 ft 1 in)	85 kg (187 lb)
PG	5	(United States)	Gaddy, Kiandre	1.96 m (6 ft 5 in)	96 kg (212 lb)
PG	8	(United States)	Medford, Lester	1.78 m (5 ft 10 in)	79 kg (174 lb)
SF	11	(Mexico)	Zesati, Carlos	2.05 m (6 ft 9 in)	98 kg (216 lb)
PG	14	(Mexico)	Álvarez, Víctor	1.83 m (6 ft 0 in)	82 kg (181 lb)
SF	15	(Mexico)	García, Emilio
SG	20	(United States)	Ifeanyi, Christian	1.93 m (6 ft 4 in)	93 kg (205 lb)
PF	21	(United States)	Mitchell, Charles	2.03 m (6 ft 8 in)	122 kg (269 lb)
SG	24	(Mexico)	De Haro, Omar	2.05 m (6 ft 9 in)	98 kg (216 lb)
C	33	(United States)	Kramer, Kelby	2.08 m (6 ft 10 in)	110 kg (243 lb)
PF	87	(Mexico)	Baldenebro, Juan	1.98 m (6 ft 6 in)	98 kg (216 lb)

Head coach

- (Argentina) Elian Villafañe

Assistant coach(es)

- (Mexico) Jeovanni Lara
- (Mexico) Adán Saldaña

Legend

- (C) Team captain
- (I) Import player
- Injured

- Roster
Updated: 26 March 2020

=== Notable players ===
Note: Flags indicate national team eligibility at FIBA-sanctioned events. Players may hold other non-FIBA nationalities not displayed.

Criteria

To appear in this section a player must have either:

- Set a club record or won an individual award while at the club
- Played at least one official international match for their national team at any time
- Played at least one official NBA match at any time.

- (United States) Cedric Moodie
- (Mexico) Irwin Ávalos
