= Cometas de Querétaro =

Mexican basketball team

Cometas de Querétaro was a basketball team in Santiago de Querétaro, Querétaro, Mexico playing in the Liga Nacional de Baloncesto Profesional (LNBP). Their home arena was Auditorio General Arteaga which holds 3,000 people and opened in 1985.

== Roster ==
- Reggie Jordan
- Albert Burditt
- Luis Rivas
- Ricky de Aragon
- Ronald Pittman
- Will Porter
- Jorge Morales
- Richard Carroll
- Stephanoni
- Carlos Zavala
- Ernesto Pérez
- Luis Villar
