= Víctor Mariscal =

Mexican basketball player (born 1972)

Personal information
- Born: 24 May 1972 (age 54) San Luis Potosí City, San Luis Potosí, Mexico
- Listed height: 6 ft 9 in (2.06 m)
- Listed weight: 200 lb (91 kg)

Career information
- Playing career: 1995–2016

Career history
- 2011–2013: Halcones de Xalapa
- 2013–2014: Ángeles Guerreros de Acapulco
- 2015–2016: Santos del Potosí

Víctor Mariscal Mata (born 24 May 1972) is a Mexican former professional basketball player.

== Career ==
Mariscal played in the Halcones de Xalapa and in the Santos del Potosí of the Liga Nacional de Baloncesto Profesional.

== National team career ==
He was member of the Mexican national team that won the silver medal in the 2011 Pan American Games.
