= Correbasket UAT =

- Nickname: Correcaminos (Roadrunners)
- League: LNBP
- Founded: 1995
- History: Correcaminos UAT; 1995–2015; Correbasket UAT; 2016–present
- Arena: Gimnasio Multidisciplinario UAT Victoria
- Capacity: 2,600
- Location: Ciudad Victoria, Tamaulipas, Mexico
- Team colors: Orange, blue, and black
- President: Rodolfo Hernández Díaz
- Head coach: Lewis LaSalle Taylor
- Ownership: UAT
- Championships: 1 (2002)
Home	Away

Correbasket UAT is a Mexican professional basketball team. It has been a member of the LNBP since the 2000 season.

== History ==
The team was founded as Correcaminos UAT in 1995 as a founding member of the Conferencia de Básquetbol Profesional (CBP). They joined Circuito Mexicano de Básquetbol (CIMEBA) in 1997, and then the Liga Nacional de Baloncesto Profesional in 2000. It was the champion in 2002 and reached the league finals twice.

The team was renamed Correbasket UAT in 2016. Correbasket is owned by the Autonomous University of Tamaulipas. In 2017, it was profiled in an ESPN article, during which season it finished last in the league. However, forward Grandy Glaze led the league in rebounding.

== Gymnasium ==
Correbasket UAT plays their home games in the Multidisciplinario Stadium UAT, also known as "El Nido", which has a capacity for 2,600 people.

== Players ==
=== Current roster ===
Note: Flags indicate national team eligibility at FIBA-sanctioned events. Players may hold other non-FIBA nationalities not displayed.

Correbasket UAT roster
Players
Coaches

Pos.	No.	Nat.	Name	Ht.	Wt.
SG	0	(United States)	Moore Jr., Tim	1.98 m (6 ft 6 in)
SG	1	(Mexico)	Barrón, Francisco
PG	3	(United States)	Clark, Kareem	1.90 m (6 ft 3 in)
PG	4	(United States)	Daniels, Damien	1.70 m (5 ft 7 in)
SG	6	(Mexico)	Cruz, Iván	1.78 m (5 ft 10 in)
PG	8	(Mexico)	Bujanos, Rey
PG	13	(Mexico)	Castillo, Carlos
PG	20	(United States)	Reyna III, Juan	1.91 m (6 ft 3 in)
PF	25	(Puerto Rico)	Torres, Julián	2.08 m (6 ft 10 in)
PF	26	(Mexico)	Haro, Andrey	2.03 m (6 ft 8 in)
PF	30	(United States)	Carlisle, Donoven	2.03 m (6 ft 8 in)
SF	31	(United States)	Hunter, Chance	1.98 m (6 ft 6 in)
C	33	(United States)	Bradshaw, Joseph	2.03 m (6 ft 8 in)

Head coach

- (United States) Lewis LaSalle Taylor

Assistant coach(es)

- (Mexico) Pedro Ramos

Legend

- (C) Team captain
- Injured

- Roster
Updated: October 14, 2020

=== Notable players ===
Note: Flags indicate national team eligibility at FIBA-sanctioned events. Players may hold other non-FIBA nationalities not displayed.

Criteria

To appear in this section a player must have either:

- Set a club record or won an individual award while at the club
- Played at least one official international match for their national team at any time
- Played at least one official NBA match at any time.

- (United States) J. R. Giddens
- (United States) Oliver Lafayette
