= 2017 LNBP Playoffs =

Tournament details
- Season: 2016–17
- Teams: 8

Final positions
- Champions: Fuerza Regia (1stth title)
- Runner-up: Soles de Mexicali
- Semifinalists: Garzas de Plata; Toros de Nuevo Laredo

The 2017 LNBP Playoffs is the postseason tournament of the Liga Nacional de Baloncesto Profesional's 2016–17 season.

== Bracket ==
First round
1	Fuerza Regia	3
8	Santos	0
4	Toros	3
5	Panteras	1
3	Garzas de Plata	3
6	Barreteros	0
2	Soles	3
7	Indios	0

Semifinals
1	Fuerza Regia	4
4	Toros	2
3	Garzas de Plata	2
2	Soles	4

Finals
1	Fuerza Regia	4
2	Soles	2

=== First round ===
All times are in Central Zone (UTC−06:00)

14 February 2017
20:00

Boxscore

Fuerza Regia	84–80	Santos San Luis
Scoring by quarter: 17–18, 13–29, 26–17, 28–16
Pts: Jeleel Akindele 19; Rebs: Héctor Hernández 7 Asts: Carlos Rivera 12		Pts: Brandon West 19; Rebs: Brandon West 11; Asts: Luis Pulido 5
Fuerza Regia leads series, 1–0

Gimnasio Nuevo León Unido, Monterrey, Nuevo León

14 February 2017
20:00

Boxscore

Garzas de Plata	93–81	Barreteros de Zacatecas
Scoring by quarter: 28–16, 18–21, 21–25, 26–19
Pts: Tyrone White 25; Rebs: Tyrone White 7 Asts: Brody Manjarres 10		Pts: Paul Marigney 24; Rebs: Sergio Escobar 6 Asts: Benjamin Puckett 7
Garzas de Plata leads series, 1–0

Gimnasio Polideportivo Carlos Martínez Balmori, Pachuca, Hidalgo

14 February 2017
20:15

Boxscore

Soles de Mexicali	87–83	Indios de Ciudad Juárez
Scoring by quarter: 21–26, 30–15, 15–24, 21–18
Pts: Alex Perez 32; Rebs: Alex Perez 9 Asts: Alex Perez 9		Pts: Anthony Bennett Jr 19; Rebs: Jorge Camacho 10; Asts: Anthony Bennett Jr 7
Soles leads series, 1–0

Auditorio del Estado, Mexicali, Baja California

14 February 2017
20:30

Boxscore

Toros de Nuevo Laredo	77–70	Panteras de Aguascalientes
Scoring by quarter: 18–19, 22–11, 18–23, 19–17
Pts: Wilfredo Pagan 13; Rebs: Marco Ramos 9 Asts: Alex Franklin 4		Pts: Karim Scott 22; Rebs: Fernando Benitez 11; Asts: Karim Malpica 6
Toros leads series, 1–0

Polyforum Dr. Rodolfo Torre Cantú, Nuevo Laredo, Tamaulipas

15 February 2017
20:00

Boxscore

Fuerza Regia	94–73	Santos San Luis
Scoring by quarter: 18–21, 27–13, 21–20, 28–19
Pts: Andrew Panko 17; Rebs: Jeleel Akindele 5 Asts: Juan Toscano 7		Pts: Brandon West 21; Rebs: Irwin Avalos 7 Asts: Xavier Roberson 4
Fuerza Regia leads series, 2–0

Gimnasio Nuevo León Unido, Monterrey, Nuevo León

15 February 2017
20:00

Boxscore

Garzas de Plata	100–86	Barreteros de Zacatecas
Scoring by quarter: 27–25, 22–28, 24–16, 27–17
Pts: William Orozco 36; Rebs: William Orozco 19; Asts: Tyrone White 7		Pts: Carl Jones 27; Rebs: Benjamin Puckett 10; Asts: Brandon Provost 5
Garzas de Plata leads series, 2–0

Gimnasio Polideportivo Carlos Martínez Balmori, Pachuca, Hidalgo

15 February 2017
20:15

Boxscore

Soles de Mexicali	92–73	Indios de Ciudad Juárez
Scoring by quarter: 24–20, 23–19, 26–10, 19–24
Pts: Lucas Martinez 25; Rebs: Lucas Martinez 7 Asts: Pedro Meza 7		Pts: Leon Gibson 22; Rebs: Leon Gibson 10; Asts: Anthony Bennett Jr 7
Soles leads series, 2–0

Auditorio del Estado, Mexicali, Baja California

15 February 2017
20:30

Boxscore

Toros de Nuevo Laredo	70–54	Panteras de Aguascalientes
Scoring by quarter: 21–17, 20–10, 15–11, 14–16
Pts: Alex Franklin 18; Rebs: René Rougeau 6 Asts: Roberto Nelson 5		Pts: Karim Scott 15; Rebs: Isaac Gutierrez 6 Asts: Fernando Benitez 4
Toros leads series, 2–0

Polyforum Dr. Rodolfo Torre Cantú, Nuevo Laredo, Tamaulipas

18 February 2017
19:00

Boxscore

Santos San Luis	80–90	Fuerza Regia
Scoring by quarter: 19–27, 17–19, 23–21, 21–23
Pts: Gregory Smith 23; Rebs: Brandon West 8 Asts: Luis Pulido 4		Pts: Héctor Hernández 17; Rebs: Jeleel Akindele 7 Asts: Carlos Rivera 6
Fuerza Regia wins series, 3–0

Auditorio Miguel Barragán, San Luis Potosí City, San Luis Potosí

18 February 2017
19:00

Boxscore

Indios de Ciudad Juárez	78–103	Soles de Mexicali
Scoring by quarter: 23–32, 17–24, 21–31, 17–16
Pts: Marcus Morrison 32; Rebs: Jorge Camacho 6 Asts: Anthony Bennett Jr 6		Pts: Justin Keenan 34; Rebs: Lucas Martinez 6 Asts: Pedro Meza 6
Soles win series, 3–0

Gimnasio Josué Neri Santos, Ciudad Juárez, Chihuahua

18 February 2017
19:00

Boxscore

Panteras de Aguascalientes	79–70	Toros de Nuevo Laredo
Scoring by quarter: 18–17, 26–16, 19–8, 16–29
Pts: Isaac Gutierrez 21; Rebs: Isaac Gutierrez 12; Asts: Karim Scott 4		Pts: Adrian Henning 16; Rebs: Juan Esteva 5 Asts: Roberto Nelson 8
Toros lead series, 2–1

Gimnasio Hermanos Carreón, Aguascalientes City, Aguascalientes

18 February 2017
20:30

Boxscore

Barreteros de Zacatecas	75–98	Garzas de Plata
Scoring by quarter: 12–24, 28–26, 21–24, 14–24
Pts: Benjamin Puckett 19; Rebs: Brandon Provost 7 Asts: Carl Jones 6		Pts: Stephen Soriano 23; Rebs: William Orozco 11; Asts: Tyrone White 8
Garzas de Plata wins series, 3–0

Gimnasio Profesor Marcelino González, Zacatecas City, Zacatecas

19 February 2017
18:00

Boxscore

Panteras de Aguascalientes	59–71	Toros de Nuevo Laredo
Scoring by quarter: 18–16, 18–23, 8–24, 15–8
Pts: Fernando Benitez 14; Rebs: Fernando Benitez 10; Asts: Karim Scott 4		Pts: Adrian Henning 16; Rebs: Lorenzo Mata 10; Asts: René Rougeau 4
Toros win series, 3–1

Gimnasio Hermanos Carreón, Aguascalientes City, Aguascalientes

=== Semifinals ===
1 March 2017
20:00

Boxscore

Fuerza Regia	70–83	Toros de Nuevo Laredo
Scoring by quarter: 15–23, 17–20, 15–20, 23–20
Pts: Jeleel Akindele 26; Rebs: Jeleel Akindele 9 Asts: Carlos Rivera 4		Pts: Lorenzo Mata 17; Rebs: Lorenzo Mata 10; Asts: Roberto Nelson 5
Toros lead series, 1–0

Gimnasio Nuevo León Unido, Monterrey, Nuevo León

1 March 2017
20:15

Boxscore

Soles de Mexicali	87–83	Garzas de Plata
Scoring by quarter: 17–23, 25–23, 15–23, 30–14
Pts: Justin Keenan 25; Rebs: Javier Carter 7 Asts: Alex Perez 8		Pts: Stephen Soriano 18; Rebs: Stephen Soriano 9 Asts: Brody Manjarres 4
Soles lead series, 1–0

Auditorio del Estado, Mexicali, Baja California

2 March 2017
20:00

Boxscore

Fuerza Regia	96–71	Toros de Nuevo Laredo
Scoring by quarter: 27–13, 25–12, 14–22, 30–24
Pts: Juan Toscano 18; Rebs: Jeleel Akindele 15; Asts: Juan Toscano 8		Pts: Roberto Nelson 17; Rebs: Adrian Henning 5 Asts: Marco Ramos 5
Series tied, 1–1

Gimnasio Nuevo León Unido, Monterrey, Nuevo León

2 March 2017
20:15

Boxscore

Soles de Mexicali	81–80	Garzas de Plata
Scoring by quarter: 23–11, 24–26, 17–27, 17–16
Pts: Alex Perez 27; Rebs: Justin Keenan 15; Asts: Alex Perez 7		Pts: Martin Samarco 29; Rebs: Brody Manjarres 6 Asts: Tyrone White 4
Soles lead series, 2–0

Auditorio del Estado, Mexicali, Baja California

5 March 2017
17:00

Boxscore

Toros de Nuevo Laredo	72–84	Fuerza Regia
Scoring by quarter: 10–19, 20–25, 21–20, 21–20
Pts: René Rougeau 15; Rebs: Lorenzo Mata 6 Asts: Wilfredo Pagan 4		Pts: Juan Toscano 20; Rebs: Andrew Panko 6 Asts: Jordan Glynn 3
Fuerza Regia leads series, 2–1

Polyforum Dr. Rodolfo Torre Cantú, Nuevo Laredo, Tamaulipas

5 March 2017
20:00

Boxscore

Garzas de Plata	96–83	Soles de Mexicali
Scoring by quarter: 20–24, 30–16, 24–18, 22–25
Pts: Romel Beck 20; Rebs: Tyrone White 10; Asts: Brody Manjarres 8		Pts: Lucas Martinez 28; Rebs: Justin Keenan 8 Asts: Alex Perez 5
Soles lead series, 2–1

Gimnasio Polideportivo Carlos Martínez Balmori, Pachuca, Hidalgo

6 March 2017
20:00

Boxscore

Garzas de Plata	92–100	Soles de Mexicali
Scoring by quarter: 23–33, 27–26, 21–20, 21–21
Pts: Martin Samarco 29; Rebs: Israel Gutiérrez 10; Asts: Brody Manjarres 9		Pts: Lucas Martinez 27; Rebs: Jason Robinson 8 Asts: Alex Perez 10
Soles lead series, 3–1

Gimnasio Polideportivo Carlos Martínez Balmori, Pachuca, Hidalgo

6 March 2017
20:30

Boxscore

Toros de Nuevo Laredo	76–87	Fuerza Regia
Scoring by quarter: 26–16, 14–27, 14–23, 22–21
Pts: Quentin Gonzales 25; Rebs: Quentin Gonzales 5 Asts: Adrian Henning 4		Pts: Jeleel Akindele 24; Rebs: Héctor Hernández 7 Asts: Carlos Rivera 7
Fuerza Regia leads series, 3–1

Polyforum Dr. Rodolfo Torre Cantú, Nuevo Laredo, Tamaulipas

8 March 2017
20:00

Boxscore

Garzas de Plata	88–85	Soles de Mexicali
Scoring by quarter: 15–24, 22–18, 23–26, 28–17
Pts: Romel Beck 19; Rebs: Israel Gutiérrez 11; Asts: Brody Manjarres 5		Pts: Lucas Martinez 23; Rebs: Alex Perez 8 Asts: Alex Perez 9
Soles lead series, 3–2

Gimnasio Polideportivo Carlos Martínez Balmori, Pachuca, Hidalgo

8 March 2017
20:30

Boxscore

Toros de Nuevo Laredo	81–71	Fuerza Regia
Scoring by quarter: 19–14, 18–15, 21–25, 23–17
Pts: Alex Franklin 25; Rebs: Alex Franklin 7 Asts: Wilfredo Pagan 6		Pts: Andrew Panko 16; Rebs: Jeleel Akindele 6 Asts: Christian Cortez 4
Fuerza Regia leads series, 3–2

Polyforum Dr. Rodolfo Torre Cantú, Nuevo Laredo, Tamaulipas

11 March 2017
18:15

Boxscore

Soles de Mexicali	100–68	Garzas de Plata
Scoring by quarter: 31–12, 28–16, 22–21, 19–19
Pts: Justin Keenan 29; Rebs: Alex Perez 9 Asts: Alex Perez 11		Pts: Martin Samarco 16; Rebs: Israel Gutiérrez 7 Asts: Stephen Soriano 4
Soles win series, 4–2

Auditorio del Estado, Mexicali, Baja California

11 March 2017
20:00

Boxscore

Fuerza Regia	73–58	Toros de Nuevo Laredo
Scoring by quarter: 19–18, 4–13, 29–13, 21–14
Pts: Jeleel Akindele 26; Rebs: Jeleel Akindele 10; Asts: Jeleel Akindele 5		Pts: Alex Franklin 13; Rebs: Wilfredo Pagan 5 Asts: Roberto Nelson 6
Fuerza Regia wins series, 4–2

Gimnasio Nuevo León Unido, Monterrey, Nuevo León

=== Finals ===
24 March 2017
20:00

Boxscore

Fuerza Regia	75–78	Soles de Mexicali
Scoring by quarter: 24–16, 20–11, 25–33, 6–18
Pts: Andrew Panko 23; Rebs: Jeleel Akindele 6 Asts: Andrew Panko 6		Pts: Justin Keenan 34; Rebs: Jason Robinson 7 Asts: Alex Perez 9
Soles lead series, 1–0

Gimnasio Nuevo León Unido, Monterrey, Nuevo León

25 March 2017
20:00

Boxscore

Fuerza Regia	66–49	Soles de Mexicali
Scoring by quarter: 17–10, 16–11, 21–14, 12–14
Pts: Carlos Rivera 12; Rebs: Andrew Panko 11; Asts: Andrew Panko 7		Pts: Justin Keenan 13; Rebs: Santiago Ibarra 7 Asts: Carlos Perez 2
Series tied, 1–1

Gimnasio Nuevo León Unido, Monterrey, Nuevo León

28 March 2017
20:15

Boxscore

Soles de Mexicali	84–86	Fuerza Regia
Scoring by quarter: 15–27, 23–18, 23–24, 23–17
Pts: Justin Keenan 23; Rebs: Santiago Ibarra 6 Asts: Alex Perez 5		Pts: Héctor Hernández 19; Rebs: Andrew Panko 8 Asts: Christian Cortez 5
Fuerza Regia leads series, 2–1

Auditorio del Estado, Mexicali, Baja California

29 March 2017
20:15

Boxscore

Soles de Mexicali	68–73	Fuerza Regia
Scoring by quarter: 14–19, 15–15, 16–22, 23–17
Pts: Justin Keenan 28; Rebs: Lucas Martinez 6 Asts: Alex Perez 6		Pts: Andrew Panko 27; Rebs: Héctor Hernández 11; Asts: Héctor Hernández 4
Fuerza Regia leads series, 3–1

Auditorio del Estado, Mexicali, Baja California

31 March 2017
20:15

Boxscore

Soles de Mexicali	90–70	Fuerza Regia
Scoring by quarter: 23-17, 20-17, 22-26, 25-10
Pts: Justin Keenan 31; Rebs: Javier Carter 7 Asts: Alex Perez 8		Pts: Héctor Hernández 19; Rebs: Jeleel Akindele 7 Asts: Andrew Panko 3
Fuerza Regia leads series, 3–2

Auditorio del Estado, Mexicali, Baja California

3 April 2017
20:00

Boxscore

Fuerza Regia	82–68	Soles de Mexicali
Scoring by quarter: 20–20, 25–19, 19–7, 18–22
Pts: Héctor Hernández 18; Rebs: Juan Toscano 8 Asts: Juan Toscano 6		Pts: Alex Perez 24; Rebs: Carlos Perez 6 Asts: Alex Perez 3
Fuerza Regia wins LNBP Finals, 4–2

Gimnasio Nuevo León Unido, Monterrey, Nuevo León
