= Palacio Contador Gastón Guelfi =

Sports venue in Montevideo, Uruguay

Palacio Peñarol
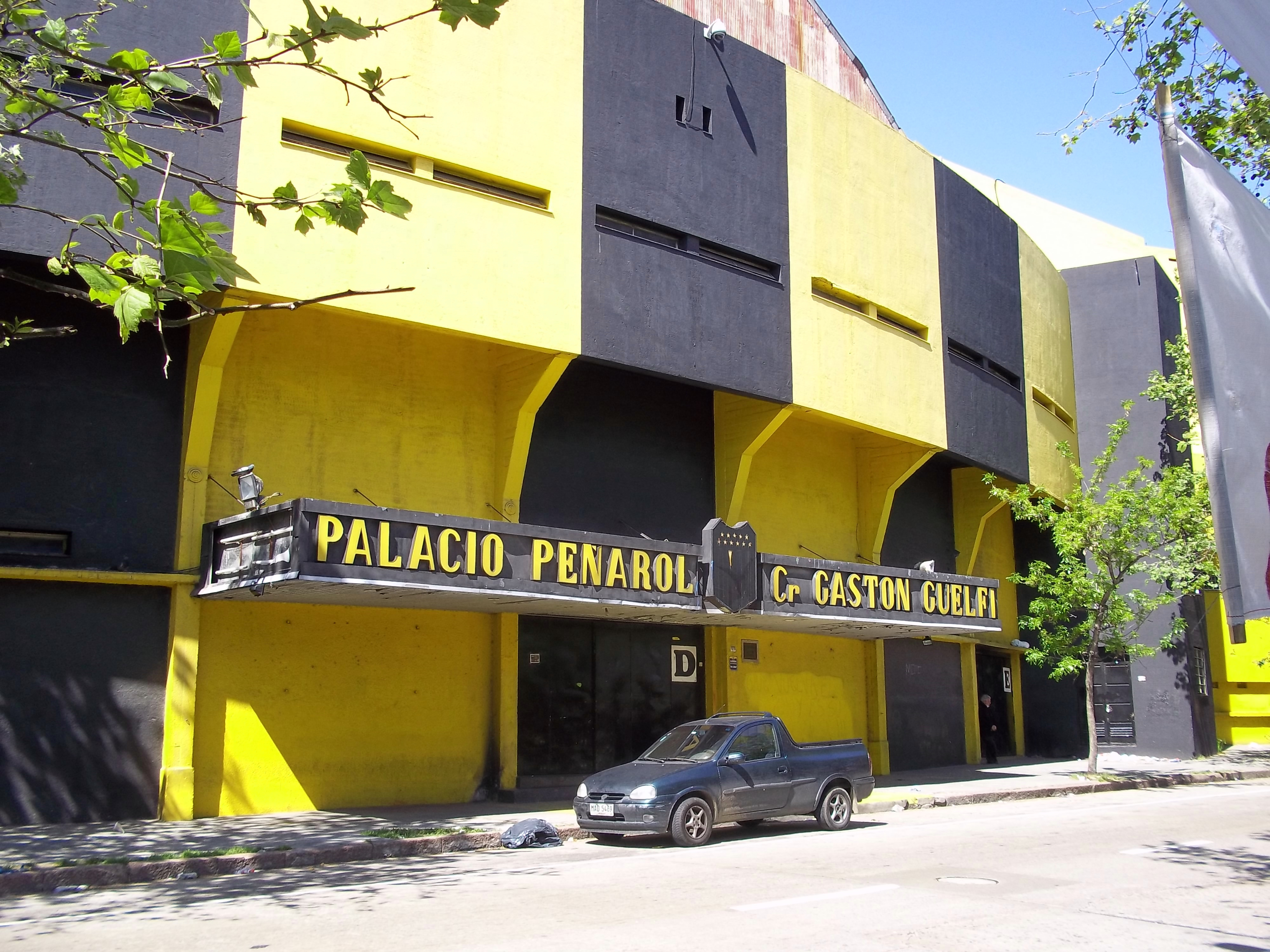
- Exterior of the arena, as seen in 2011
- Interactive map of Palacio Peñarol
- Full name: Palacio Peñarol Contador Gastón Guelfi
- Location: Magallanes 1721, 11200; Montevideo, Uruguay
- Owner: Club Atlético Peñarol
- Capacity: Basketball: 4,700; Concerts: 5,400
- Surface: Parquet

Construction
- Opened: 1955
- Renovated: 2010, 2011

Tenants
- Peñarol basketball team Uruguay national basketball team

Website
- peñarol.org/palacio-gastonguelfi

The Palacio Peñarol Contador Gastón Guelfi, commonly known as Palacio Peñarol, is an indoor sporting arena that is located in Montevideo, Uruguay. With a seating capacity for basketball games is 4,700 spectators, it is mainly used to host basketball games.

It was one of the host arenas for the 2017 FIBA AmeriCup, the official Americas Basketball Championship.

The arena also contains the club museum and club offices for Club Atlético Peñarol.

== History ==
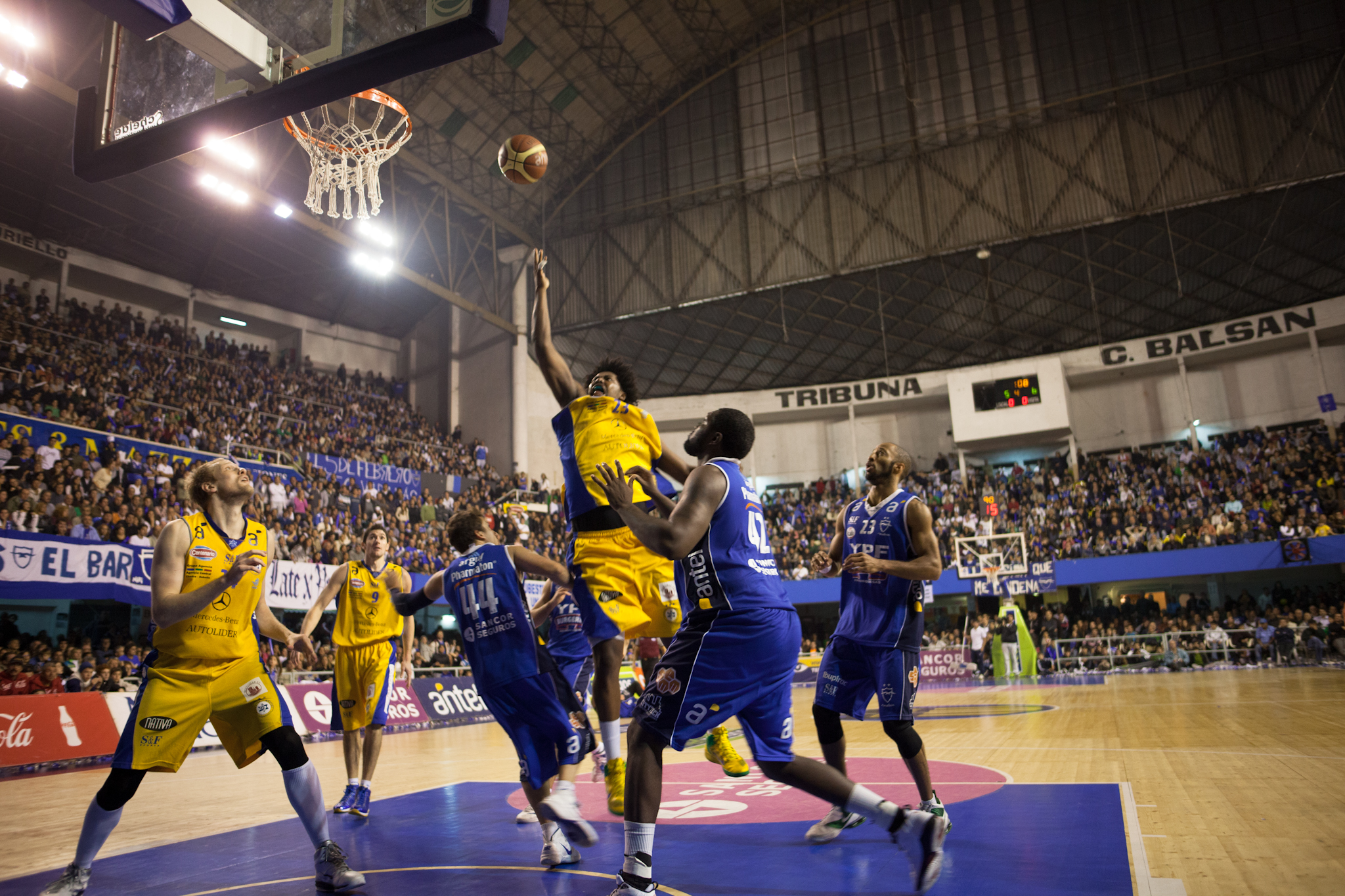
Uruguayan League 2011–12 season final, between Hebraica and Macabi and Malvín.

Palacio Contador Gastón Guelfi was originally opened in 1955. In 1994 The Ramones performed there. The arena was renovated in 2010 and 2011. The arena was used as a host venue of the 2017 FIBA AmeriCup.

=== Group C ===
Pos	Team	Pld	W	L	PF	PA	PD	Pts	Qualification
1	United States	3	3	0	243	178	+65	6	Semifinals
2	Uruguay (H)	3	2	1	211	199	+12	5	
3	Dominican Republic	3	1	2	199	202	−3	4	
4	Panama	3	0	3	188	262	−74	3	

Source: FIBA
Rules for classification: 1) Points; 2) Head-to-head results; 3) Points difference; 4) Points scored.
(H) Hosts

All times are local (UTC−3).

28 August 2017
18:00

Boxscore

United States	97–56	Panama
Scoring by quarter: 27–10, 22–15, 21–13, 27–18
Pts: Hilliard, Holmes 17; Rebs: Plumlee 12; Asts: Drew II 7		Pts: Forbes 19; Rebs: Bishop 10; Asts: Forbes 3

Palacio Contador Gastón Guelfi, Montevideo, Uruguay
Referees: Fernando Sampietro (ARG), Omar Bermúdez (MEX), José Melgarejo (COL)

28 August 2017
20:30

Boxscore

Dominican Republic	57–66	Uruguay
Scoring by quarter: 7–23, 25–9, 10–14, 15–20
Pts: Santana 15; Rebs: Rojas, Santana 6 Asts: three players 2		Pts: Granger 23; Rebs: Batista 9 Asts: Granger 8

Palacio Contador Gastón Guelfi, Montevideo, Uruguay
Referees: Guilherme Locatelli (BRA), Matthew Kallio (CAN), Fabricio Vito (ARG)

29 August 2017
18:00

Boxscore

Panama	64–86	Dominican Republic
Scoring by quarter: 22–27, 19–18, 6–18, 17–23
Pts: Bishop 20; Rebs: Levy 9 Asts: Carter 4		Pts: Liz 19; Rebs: Delgado 13; Asts: Solano 8

Palacio Contador Gastón Guelfi, Montevideo, Uruguay
Referees: Fabricio Vito (ARG), Omar Bermúdez (MEX), Fernando Oliveira (BRA)

29 August 2017
20:30

Boxscore

Uruguay	66–74	United States
Scoring by quarter: 20–11, 12–23, 18–16, 16–24
Pts: Batista 22; Rebs: Batista 14; Asts: Granger 6		Pts: C. Williams 16; Rebs: Warney 14; Asts: Drew II, Munford 4

Palacio Contador Gastón Guelfi, Montevideo, Uruguay
Referees: Guilherme Locatelli (BRA), Matthew Kallio (CAN), Fernando Sampietro (ARG)

30 August 2017
18:00

Boxscore

Dominican Republic	56–72	United States
Scoring by quarter: 13–20, 15–18, 12–16, 16–18
Pts: Deleon 15; Rebs: Rojas 11; Asts: Deleon, Solano 3		Pts: C. Williams 15; Rebs: Warney 9 Asts: Drew II, Marshall 4

Palacio Contador Gastón Guelfi, Montevideo, Uruguay
Referees: Guilherme Locatelli (BRA), Omar Bermúdez (MEX), Matthew Kallio (CAN)

30 August 2017
20:30

Boxscore

Panama	68–79	Uruguay
Scoring by quarter: 15–20, 14–22, 15–29, 24–8
Pts: Bishop 19; Rebs: Carter 14; Asts: Luzcando 8		Pts: Granger 20; Rebs: Granger 6 Asts: Granger 6

Palacio Contador Gastón Guelfi, Montevideo, Uruguay
Referees: Fernando Sampietro (ARG), Fernando Oliveira (BRA), Fabricio Vito (ARG)
