= 2017 FIBA AmeriCup =

Tournament details
- Host countries: Argentina; Colombia; Uruguay
- Dates: 25 August – 3 September
- Teams: 12
- Venues: 4 (in 4 host cities)

Final positions
- Champions: United States (7th title)
- Runners-up: Argentina
- Third place: Mexico
- Fourth place: Virgin Islands

Tournament statistics
- MVP: (United States) Jameel Warney
- Top scorer: (Venezuela) John Cox (20.3 points per game)

The 2017 FIBA AmeriCup was the 18th edition of the FIBA AmeriCup, which is the main tournament for senior men's basketball national teams of the FIBA Americas. The tournament was held in Medellín, Colombia, Montevideo, Uruguay, and Bahía Blanca and Córdoba, in Argentina, from 25 August, to 3 September 2017.

Unlike previous editions, the tournament did not award spots for the FIBA World Cup or the Summer Olympic Games, but the top seven teams qualified to the 2019 Pan American Games.

The United States, with a team of NBA G League players, won their seventh gold medal at the tournament, after defeating Argentina, by a score of 81–76, in the final, while Mexico took home the bronze, by beating the U.S. Virgin Islands, 79–65.

== Qualified teams ==
The top five teams at the 2016 Centrobasket and 2016 South American Championship qualified to the tournament, plus Canada and United States as the only countries in their subregion.

- Host nations
  - Argentina
  - Colombia
  - Uruguay
- Central American and Caribbean Subzone:
  - Dominican Republic
  - Mexico
  - Panama
  - Puerto Rico
  - Virgin Islands
- North American Subzone:
  - Canada
  - United States
- South American Subzone:
  - Brazil
  - Venezuela

== Hosts selection ==
On 5 April 2017 FIBA Americas announced that Argentina, Colombia and Uruguay were chosen as the hosts of the AmeriCup.

== Venues ==
2017 FIBA AmeriCup (South America)
2017 FIBA AmeriCup (South America)	Medellín	Montevideo
2017 FIBA AmeriCup (South America)	Coliseo Iván de Bedout	Palacio Contador Gastón Guelfi
2017 FIBA AmeriCup (South America)	Capacity: 6,000	Capacity: 4,700
2017 FIBA AmeriCup (South America)	Bahía Blanca	Córdoba
2017 FIBA AmeriCup (South America)	Estadio Osvaldo Casanova	Orfeo Superdomo
2017 FIBA AmeriCup (South America)	Capacity: 3,950	Capacity: 14,000

== Draw ==
The draw was held in Buenos Aires, Argentina on 20 April 2017.

Recipient 1	Recipient 2	Recipient 3	Recipient 4
Argentina; Colombia; Uruguay	United States; Venezuela; Puerto Rico	Dominican Republic; Mexico; Canada	Panama; Virgin Islands; Brazil^{a}

^a Suspended at the time of the draw.

== First round ==
=== Group A ===
Pos	Team	Pld	W	L	PF	PA	PD	Pts	Qualification
1	Mexico	3	3	0	250	212	+38	6	Advance to semifinals
2	Puerto Rico	3	2	1	246	221	+25	5	
3	Brazil	3	1	2	232	262	−30	4	
4	Colombia (H)	3	0	3	216	249	−33	3	

Source: FIBA
Rules for classification: 1) Points; 2) Head-to-head results; 3) Points difference; 4) Points scored.
(H) Hosts

All times are local (UTC−5).

25 August 2017
17:30

Boxscore

Puerto Rico	66–69	Mexico
Scoring by quarter: 15–12, 16–27, 20–16, 15–14
Pts: Rosario 14; Rebs: Díaz 10; Asts: Abreu 6		Pts: Pérez 24; Rebs: Hernández 7 Asts: three players 3

Coliseo Iván de Bedout, Medellín, Colombia
Referees: Juan Fernández (ARG), Andrés Bartel (URU), Jorge Cabrera (CUB)

25 August 2017
20:00

Boxscore

Brazil	76–74	Colombia
Scoring by quarter: 20–17, 16–16, 14–15, 26–26
Pts: Meindl 19; Rebs: Caboclo 11; Asts: De Assis 6		Pts: Tello 17; Rebs: Angola 11; Asts: three players 3

Coliseo Iván de Bedout, Medellín, Colombia
Referees: Alejandro Sánchez (URU), Matthew Myers (USA), Carlos Peralta (ECU)

26 August 2017
17:30

Boxscore

Mexico	99–76	Brazil
Scoring by quarter: 22–19, 19–14, 30–23, 28–20
Pts: Cruz, Mata 17; Rebs: Mata 7 Asts: Pérez 7		Pts: Meindl 19; Rebs: Batista 6 Asts: De Assis 7

Coliseo Iván de Bedout, Medellín, Colombia
Referees: Alejandro Sánchez (URU), Andrés Bartel (URU), Carlos Peralta (ECU)

26 August 2017
20:00

Boxscore

Colombia	72–91	Puerto Rico
Scoring by quarter: 26–26, 10–21, 14–23, 22–21
Pts: Jackson 20; Rebs: Tello 7 Asts: Tello 4		Pts: Rivera 15; Rebs: Andújar, Davis 7 Asts: Abreu, Rivera 4

Coliseo Iván de Bedout, Medellín, Colombia
Referees: Juan Fernández (ARG), Matthew Myers (USA), Richard Pereira (URU)

27 August 2017
15:30

Boxscore

Brazil	80–89	Puerto Rico
Scoring by quarter: 14–18, 17–17, 23–27, 26–27
Pts: Meindl 17; Rebs: Meindl 6 Asts: De Assis 8		Pts: Rodríguez 23; Rebs: Andújar, Gaston 7 Asts: three players 3

Coliseo Iván de Bedout, Medellín, Colombia
Referees: Alejandro Sánchez (URU), Carlos Peralta (ECU), Richard Pereira (URU)

27 August 2017
18:00

Boxscore

Mexico	82–70	Colombia
Scoring by quarter: 17–15, 21–22, 22–21, 22–12
Pts: J. Gutiérrez 24; Rebs: Mata 7 Asts: J. Gutiérrez 5		Pts: Angola 16; Rebs: Mosquera 7 Asts: Atencia 9

Coliseo Iván de Bedout, Medellín, Colombia
Referees: Andrés Bartel (URU), Jorge Cabrera (CUB), Matthew Myers (USA)

=== Group B ===
Pos	Team	Pld	W	L	PF	PA	PD	Pts	Qualification
1	Argentina (H)	3	3	0	263	206	+57	6	Advance to semifinals
2	Virgin Islands*	3	1	2	225	261	−36	4 (Note: Virgin Islands 3 Pts, +10 PD; Canada 3 Pts, –3 PD; Venezuela 3 Pts, −7 PD)	Advance to semifinals
3	Canada	3	1	2	232	241	−9	4	
4	Venezuela	3	1	2	214	226	−12	4	

Source: FIBA
Rules for classification: 1) Points; 2) Head-to-head results; 3) Points difference; 4) Points scored.
(H) Hosts
Notes:

* Two qualifying spots were available from Group B as Argentina were guaranteed to progress, regardless of their performance, due to their status as the "main organiser" of the tournament.

All times are local (UTC−3).

27 August 2017
19:30

Boxscore

Virgin Islands	83–71	Canada
Scoring by quarter: 20–16, 15–14, 28–19, 20–22
Pts: Hodge 25; Rebs: Ju. Gray 8 Asts: Hodge 8		Pts: Hanlan 10; Rebs: Rathan-Mayes 10; Asts: Rathan-Mayes 6

Estadio Osvaldo Casanova, Bahía Blanca, Argentina
Referees: Julio Anaya (PAN), Rodrigo Mejía (COL), Jonathan Sterling (USA)

27 August 2017
22:00

Boxscore

Argentina	67–62	Venezuela
Scoring by quarter: 12–14, 16–18, 18–11, 21–19
Pts: Deck 16; Rebs: Deck 6 Asts: Campazzo 9		Pts: Cox 16; Rebs: Cox, Graterol 7 Asts: G. Vargas 4

Estadio Osvaldo Casanova, Bahía Blanca, Argentina
Referees: Marcos Benito (BRA), Jesed Díaz (PUR), Krishna Domínguez (MEX)

28 August 2017
19:30

Boxscore

Canada	86–92 (OT)	Argentina
Scoring by quarter: 16–25, 24–17, 15–11, 24–26, Overtime: 7–13
Pts: Heslip 24; Rebs: Nicholson 18; Asts: Rathan-Mayes 5		Pts: Campazzo 23; Rebs: Deck 9 Asts: Campazzo 6

Estadio Osvaldo Casanova, Bahía Blanca, Argentina
Referees: Marcos Benito (BRA), Krishna Domínguez (MEX), Rodrigo Mejía (COL)

28 August 2017
22:00

Boxscore

Venezuela	86–84	Virgin Islands
Scoring by quarter: 23–21, 24–21, 16–14, 23–28
Pts: Cox 23; Rebs: Colmenares 14; Asts: Cox, Guillént 5		Pts: Hodge 24; Rebs: Simmons 6 Asts: Hodge 7

Estadio Osvaldo Casanova, Bahía Blanca, Argentina
Referees: Julio Anaya (PAN), Jesed Díaz (PUR), Fabiano Huber (BRA)

29 August 2017
19:30

Boxscore

Venezuela	66–75	Canada
Scoring by quarter: 16–13, 11–16, 21–19, 18–27
Pts: Cox 22; Rebs: Colmenares 13; Asts: Guillént, G. Vargas 4		Pts: Rathan-Mayes 22; Rebs: Pierre 11; Asts: Rathan-Mayes 8

Estadio Osvaldo Casanova, Bahía Blanca, Argentina
Referees: Marcos Benito (BRA), Fabiano Huber (BRA), Jonathan Sterling (USA)

29 August 2017
22:00

Boxscore

Virgin Islands	58–104	Argentina
Scoring by quarter: 10–29, 17–19, 17–35, 14–21
Pts: Simmons 13; Rebs: Adams 10; Asts: Adams, Hart 3		Pts: Redivo 19; Rebs: Brussino 6 Asts: Vildoza 7

Estadio Osvaldo Casanova, Bahía Blanca, Argentina
Referees: Julio Anaya (PAN), Jesed Díaz (PUR), Rodrigo Mejía (COL),

=== Group C ===
Pos	Team	Pld	W	L	PF	PA	PD	Pts	Qualification
1	United States	3	3	0	243	178	+65	6	Advance to semifinals
2	Uruguay (H)	3	2	1	211	199	+12	5	
3	Dominican Republic	3	1	2	199	202	−3	4	
4	Panama	3	0	3	188	262	−74	3	

Source: FIBA
Rules for classification: 1) Points; 2) Head-to-head results; 3) Points difference; 4) Points scored.
(H) Hosts

All times are local (UTC−3).

28 August 2017
18:00

Boxscore

United States	97–56	Panama
Scoring by quarter: 27–10, 22–15, 21–13, 27–18
Pts: Hilliard, Holmes 17; Rebs: Plumlee 12; Asts: Drew II 7		Pts: Forbes 19; Rebs: Bishop 10; Asts: Forbes 3

Palacio Contador Gastón Guelfi, Montevideo, Uruguay
Referees: Fernando Sampietro (ARG), Omar Bermúdez (MEX), José Melgarejo (COL)

28 August 2017
20:30

Boxscore

Dominican Republic	57–66	Uruguay
Scoring by quarter: 7–23, 25–9, 10–14, 15–20
Pts: Santana 15; Rebs: Rojas, Santana 6 Asts: three players 2		Pts: Granger 23; Rebs: Batista 9 Asts: Granger 8

Palacio Contador Gastón Guelfi, Montevideo, Uruguay
Referees: Guilherme Locatelli (BRA), Matthew Kallio (CAN), Fabricio Vito (ARG)

29 August 2017
18:00

Boxscore

Panama	64–86	Dominican Republic
Scoring by quarter: 22–27, 19–18, 6–18, 17–23
Pts: Bishop 20; Rebs: Levy 9 Asts: Carter 4		Pts: Liz 19; Rebs: Delgado 13; Asts: Solano 8

Palacio Contador Gastón Guelfi, Montevideo, Uruguay
Referees: Fabricio Vito (ARG), Omar Bermúdez (MEX), Fernando Oliveira (BRA)

29 August 2017
20:30

Boxscore

Uruguay	66–74	United States
Scoring by quarter: 20–11, 12–23, 18–16, 16–24
Pts: Batista 22; Rebs: Batista 14; Asts: Granger 6		Pts: C. Williams 16; Rebs: Warney 14; Asts: Drew II, Munford 4

Palacio Contador Gastón Guelfi, Montevideo, Uruguay
Referees: Guilherme Locatelli (BRA), Matthew Kallio (CAN), Fernando Sampietro (ARG)

30 August 2017
18:00

Boxscore

Dominican Republic	56–72	United States
Scoring by quarter: 13–20, 15–18, 12–16, 16–18
Pts: Deleon 15; Rebs: Rojas 11; Asts: Deleon, Solano 3		Pts: C. Williams 15; Rebs: Warney 9 Asts: Drew II, Marshall 4

Palacio Contador Gastón Guelfi, Montevideo, Uruguay
Referees: Guilherme Locatelli (BRA), Omar Bermúdez (MEX), Matthew Kallio (CAN)

30 August 2017
20:30

Boxscore

Panama	68–79	Uruguay
Scoring by quarter: 15–20, 14–22, 15–29, 24–8
Pts: Bishop 19; Rebs: Carter 14; Asts: Luzcando 8		Pts: Granger 20; Rebs: Granger 6 Asts: Granger 6

Palacio Contador Gastón Guelfi, Montevideo, Uruguay
Referees: Fernando Sampietro (ARG), Fernando Oliveira (BRA), Fabricio Vito (ARG)

== Final round ==
Semifinals
2 September
United States	90
Virgin Islands	62
2 September
Argentina	84
Mexico	67

Final
3 September
United States	81
Argentina	76
Third place game
3 September
Virgin Islands	65
Mexico	79

All times are local (UTC−3).

=== Semifinals ===
2 September 2017
18:30

Boxscore

United States	90–62	Virgin Islands
Scoring by quarter: 22–10, 22–17, 18–15, 28–20
Pts: Munford 20; Rebs: Munford 10; Asts: Drew II 7		Pts: Martinez 12; Rebs: three players 5 Asts: Hodge, Rivera 6

Orfeo Superdomo, Córdoba, Argentina
Referees: Julio Anaya (PAN), Alejandro Sánchez (URU)

2 September 2017
21:00

Boxscore

Argentina	84–67	Mexico
Scoring by quarter: 21–18, 18–18, 23–15, 22–16
Pts: Garino 20; Rebs: Brussino, Deck 8 Asts: Campazzo 9		Pts: Cruz 19; Rebs: Benítez 7 Asts: Cruz 4

Orfeo Superdomo, Córdoba, Argentina
Referees: Jesed Díaz (PUR), Matthew Kallio (CAN)

=== Third place game ===
3 September 2017
18:30

Boxscore

Virgin Islands	65–79	Mexico
Scoring by quarter: 7–20, 19–19, 23–22, 16–18
Pts: Hodge 20; Rebs: Edwin 7 Asts: three players 3		Pts: Cruz 22; Rebs: Hernández 11; Asts: Pérez 6

Orfeo Superdomo, Córdoba, Argentina
Referees: Jesed Díaz (PUR), Matthew Kallio (CAN)

=== Final ===
3 September 2017
21:00

Boxscore

United States	81–76	Argentina
Scoring by quarter: 15–22, 12–20, 23–14, 31–20
Pts: Warney 21; Rebs: Warney 7 Asts: Marshall 7		Pts: Brussino 26; Rebs: Garino 8 Asts: Brussino 6

Orfeo Superdomo, Córdoba, Argentina
Referees: Julio Anaya (PAN), Alejandro Sánchez (URU)

== Final standings ==
Rank	Team	Record
1st place, gold medalist(s)	United States	5–0
2nd place, silver medalist(s)	Argentina	4–1
3rd place, bronze medalist(s)	Mexico	4–1
4	Virgin Islands	1–4
5	Puerto Rico	2–1
6	Uruguay	2–1
7	Dominican Republic	1–2
8	Canada	1–2
9	Venezuela	1–2
10	Brazil	1–2
11	Colombia	0–3
12	Panama	0–3

== Statistics and awards ==
=== Statistical leaders ===
Points

Name	PPG
(Venezuela) John Cox	20.3
(Uruguay) Jayson Granger	20.0
(Brazil) Léonardo Meindl	18.3
(Mexico) Francisco Cruz	16.8
(United States Virgin Islands) Walter Hodge	16.8

Rebounds

Name	RPG
(Canada) Andrew Nicholson	10.0
(Venezuela) Néstor Colmenares	9.7
(Dominican Republic) Sadiel Rojas	9.7
(United States) Jameel Warney	8.6
(Dominican Republic) Ángel Delgado	8.3
(Panama) Javier Carter	8.3
(Uruguay) Esteban Batista	8.3

Assists

Name	APG
(Brazil) Fúlvio de Assis	7.0
(Uruguay) Jayson Granger	6.7
(Argentina) Facundo Campazzo	6.6
(Canada) Xavier Rathan-Mayes	6.3
(United States) Larry Drew II	5.0

Blocks

Name	BPG
(Mexico) Lorenzo Mata	2.0
(United States Virgin Islands) Cuthbert Victor	2.0
(Canada) Andrew Nicholson	1.7
(Canada) Joel Anthony	1.3
(Venezuela) Windi Graterol	1.3

Steals

Name	SPG
(Colombia) Michaell Jackson	2.7
(Panama) Eugenio Luzcando	2.3
(Puerto Rico) Ángel Rodríguez	2.3
(Argentina) Facundo Campazzo	2.2
(Mexico) Jorge Gutiérrez	2.2

=== Awards ===
2017 FIBA AmeriCup winners

United States
Seventh title

Most Valuable Player
(United States) Jameel Warney

All-Tournament Team

- (Argentina) Facundo Campazzo
- (Mexico) Francisco Cruz
- (United States) Darrun Hilliard
- (Argentina) Nicolás Brussino
- (United States) Jameel Warney (MVP)
