= Balmori =

Balmori may refer to:

- Diana Balmori (1932–2016), Spanish landscape and urban designer
- Jesús Balmori (1887–1948), Filipino journalist, playwright, and poet
- Santos Balmori (1899–1992), Spanish-Mexican painter
- Polideportivo Carlos Martínez Balmori, an indoor arena in Mineral de la Reforma, Mexico
