= Deji Akindele =

Nigerian basketball player

Personal information
- Born: April 2, 1983 (age 43) Abeokuta, Nigeria
- Listed height: 7 ft 1 in (2.16 m)
- Listed weight: 245 lb (111 kg)

Career information
- College: Chicago State (2003–2005)
- NBA draft: 2005: undrafted
- Playing career: 2005–2023
- Position: Center

Career history
- 2005–2006: Fort Worth Flyers
- 2006–2007: Iowa Energy
- 2007–2008: Pau-Orthez
- 2008–2009: Scavolini Spar Pesaro
- 2009–2010: SPO Rouen Basket
- 2010–2011: Nizhny Novgorod
- 2011–2012: Spartak Primorye
- 2012: Jiangsu Monkey Kings
- 2012–2013: Juvecaserta Basket
- 2013–2014: Budućnost Podgorica
- 2014: Gran Canaria
- 2014–2015: Baloncesto Fuenlabrada
- 2015–2016: Vaqueros de Bayamón
- 2016–2017: Fuerza Regia
- 2017: Yalovaspor BK
- 2017–2018: Capitanes de Arecibo
- 2018–2019: Fuerza Regia
- 2019–2020: Real Estelí
- 2020–2021: Vaqueros de Bayamón
- 2021–2022: Soles de Mexicali
- 2022: Halcones de Xalapa
- 2023: Isidro Metapán
- 2023: Brumas de Jinotega

Career highlights
- LNB champion (2018); Montenegrin Cup winner (2014); MCC Defensive Player of the Year (2005)
Medals
Men's basketball
Representing Nigeria
AfroBasket
Silver medal – second place	2017 Tunisia/Senegal

Akindele Jeleel Ayodeji (born April 2, 1983) is a Nigerian former professional basketball player.

== Collegiate career ==
Akindele chose Chicago State over Rutgers, St. Peters and St. Marys. During Akindele's first season in Chicago, the 7'1" center averaged 7.1 points per game, 5.6 rebounds and 1.94 blocks per game. In his second season, Akindele improved his block total by 8 in 4 fewer games (2.50 bpg), as well as improving his scoring average to 12 ppg. His best game, statistically, was when he registered 28 points (10-for-13 field goals), 21 rebounds, and 4 blocks in 79–71 loss to Green Bay on December 1, 2004. He was also named the Mid-Continent Conference defensive player of the year for 2004–2005.

== Professional career ==
Akindele left Chicago State after his sophomore year, declaring himself eligible for the 2005 NBA draft. Going unselected in 2005, he had a short stint with the NBA team Golden State Warriors. Akindele was then selected in the fourth round of the Development League's Draft by the Fort Worth Flyers.

In December 2010 he signed with Montepaschi Siena until the end of the 2010–11 season. In August 2011 he returned to Russia to play for Spartak Primorye. In February 2012, he signed in Iran with Petrochimi Bandar Imam. In August 2012, he signed with Juvecaserta Basket. In April 2013, he left them and signed with Champville in Lebanon.

In August 2013, he signed with Budućnost Podgorica. Once the Adriatic League regular season finished, in April 2014 Akindele signed for Gran Canaria until the end of the 2013–14 season.

In September 2014, he signed with Baloncesto Fuenlabrada of Spain for the 2014–15 ACB season. He won the ACB Player of the Month Award in January 2015.

On June 11, 2015, he signed with Yeşilgiresun Belediye of the Turkish Basketball League for the 2015–16 season. On June 27, 2015, he signed a short-term deal with Vaqueros de Bayamón of Puerto Rico for the rest of the 2015 BSN season. In July 2015, he joined the Metros de Santiago of Dominican Republic for the rest of the 2015 LNB season.

In October 2016, Akindele signed with Fuerza Regia of the Mexican LNBP. On April 5, 2017, he re-joined the Vaqueros de Bayamón.

In December 2017, Akindele signed with Yalovaspor BK of the Turkish Basketball First League. On April 10, 2018, he returned to Puerto Rico with Capitanes de Arecibo. Akindele rejoined Vaqueros de Bayamón on February 26, 2020, replacing the injured Greg Smith.

== National team ==
He was part of the Nigeria national basketball team, and represented Nigeria at the 2007 and 2009 African Championships, averaging 8.3 points, 4.7 rebounds, and 0.6 assists per game.
