= Carlos Rivera (basketball) =

Puerto Rican basketball player

Leones de Ponce
- Title: Head coach
- League: Baloncesto Superior Nacional

Personal information
- Born: February 5, 1983 (age 43) San Germán, Puerto Rico
- Listed height: 6 ft 2 in (1.88 m)
- Listed weight: 200 lb (91 kg)

Career information
- College: Hofstra (2003–2007)
- Playing career: 2007–2022
- Position: Guard

Career history

Playing
- 2007–2008: Stal Ostrów Wielkopolski
- 2008–2011: Capitanes de Arecibo
- 2011–2014: Halcones Rojos Veracruz
- 2014–2016: Leones de Ponce
- 2016–2019: Fuerza Regia de Monterrey
- 2019–2022: Leones de Ponce

Coaching
- 2023–present: Leones de Ponce
- 2024: Halcones Rojos Veracruz

Career highlights
- 4x BSN champion (2008, 2012, 2014, 2015); 3x LNBP champion (2011–12, 2016–17 & 2018–19)

Carlos Rubén Rivera Ruíz (born February 5, 1983) is a Puerto Rican former professional basketball player, and current head coach for the Leones de Ponce of the Baloncesto Superior Nacional (BSN). As a player, he was a key part of the Puerto Rican national team, where he participated at the 2014 FIBA Basketball World Cup and the 2015 FIBA Americas Championship.

== High school ==
He graduated from Miami Christian School in 2003, where he played alongside José Juan Barea.

== College ==
He graduated from Hofstra University in 2007.
