= Parish Episcopal School =

Private prep school in Dallas, Texas, US

Location
- 4101 Sigma Rd. Dallas, Dallas County, Texas 75244; United States; 32.935306°N 96.843821°W

Information
- Type: Private School, University-preparatory school
- Motto: Wisdom, Honor, and Service
- Established: 1972
- Staff: 110
- Faculty: 130
- Enrollment: 1,220
- Student to teacher ratio: 16:1
- Campus: 50 acres (200,000 m^{2})
- Sports: 22 sports for 7th-12th grade, 70+ athletic teams
- Mascot: Panther
- Tuition: $23,195 to $39,080
- Website: www.parish.org

Parish Episcopal School is a co-educational, college preparatory day school, serving students in PreK through 12th grade across two campuses in Dallas, Texas. As of the 2023-24 school year, enrollment is approximately 1,200 students, making it one of the largest independent schools in Dallas County.

== History ==
Parish Episcopal School was founded in 1972 as Parish Day School, an outreach ministry of the Episcopal Church of the Transfiguration in Dallas. Led by the founding headmistress Mary Loving Blair, the school started with PreK and kindergarten, and expanded to include elementary and middle school grades at its Hillcrest campus at Hillcrest Road and Spring Valley Road. In 2001, the school was renamed Parish Episcopal School to reflect its broader academic mission as a college preparatory, independent school, educating students from PreK - 12th grade. In 2002, the school acquired the former ExxonMobil campus at Midway Road and Spring Valley Road, featuring building designed by architect I. M. Pei. The renovated 50-acre Midway campus opened in 2004 for 3rd through 12th grades. The original Hillcrest campus remains for PreK through 2nd grade. Dr. Matthew J. Rush, who was previously at The Kincaid School in Houston, TX, currently serves as the Parish's Allen Meyer Family Head of School.

== Academics ==
The Upper School offers honors and AP courses. Students are expected to take a course of study which meets the entry requirements of major colleges and universities.

Beginning in eighth grade there is a world religions study which is required. Lower grades take part in religion classes.

== Campus life ==
The Parish Midway campus is centered around a 337,000-square-foot (31,300 m^{2}) academic building designed by an architecture team of I.M. Pei and Henry N. Cobb. A former ExxonMobil office complex, the building in North Dallas was acquired in 2002. A performing arts center was added. The new Upper School includes science labs, a teaching darkroom, Smart Boards in almost all classrooms, world languages labs, and a counseling center. Surrounding this central building are athletic facilities with a gymnasium, playing fields, and a stadium. The original Hillcrest Campus is located approximately 5 miles (8.0 km) east of Midway Road on the grounds of the Church of the Transfiguration. The Hillcrest campus houses the school's Pre–K through grade 2 program.

== Religious life ==
In 2012, Episcopal Church of the Transfiguration restructured, giving up ownership of Parish Episcopal School. The decision allowed Parish to maintain accreditation as an independent private school. Parish Episcopal School is now governed by a board of trustees, a percentage of whom are members of the church.

There are daily chapel services and a weekly formal Eucharist service every Thursday. The chapel services at the Hillcrest campus take place in the Church of Transfiguration.

== Notable alumni ==
- Javier Carter (2009), basketball player who plays overseas
