= Alonso Izaguirre =

Mexican basketball player (born 1976)

Personal information
- Born: 14 December 1976 (age 49) Culiacán, Sinaloa, Mexico
- Listed height: 6 ft 7 in (2.01 m)
- Listed weight: 200 lb (91 kg)

Career information
- College: ITESM
- Playing career: 2000–2014

Career history
- 2000–2002: Lobos UAdeC
- 2003: Fuerza Regia de Monterrey
- 2004: Lobos UAdeC
- 2005–2009: Halcones Rojos Veracruz
- 2010: Pioneros de Quintana Roo
- 2011: Rayos de Hermosillo
- 2011: Frayles de Guasave
- 2011: Fuerza Regia de Monterrey
- 2012: Fuerza Guinda de Nogales
- 2012: Fuerza Regia de Monterrey
- 2013: Frayles de Guasave
- 2013: Fuerza Regia de Monterrey
- 2014: Frayles de Guasave

Alonso Izaguirre López (born 14 December 1976) is a Mexican former professional basketball player and current commissioner of Liga Nacional de Baloncesto Profesional.

== Career ==
Izaguirre made his debut in 2000 season with the Lobos UAdeC to play in the LNBP, then in 2011 he made his debut in Frayles de Guasave in the CIBACOPA league. He also played in the Fuerza Regia de Monterrey and in the Halcones Rojos Veracruz of the same league.

== Managing career ==
He was named commissioner of Liga Nacional de Baloncesto Profesional in 2016.
