= Arena Mobil =

Indoor arena in Monterrey, Nuevo León

- Owner: Government of Nuevo León
- Capacity: 5,000 basketball 3,500 Indoor Soccer

Tenants
- Fuerza Regia de Monterrey (LNBP) (2008-present); Fuerza Regia de Monterrey (women) (LNBPF) (2022-present); Monterrey La Raza (WISL) (1993-1997)& (1999-2000)

Arena Mobil, formerly known as Gimnasio Nuevo León, is an indoor arena in Monterrey, Nuevo León. It is primarily used for basketball and is the home arena of the Fuerza Regia de Monterrey of the Liga Nacional de Baloncesto Profesional, Mexico's top basketball league. It has a capacity of 5,000 people.
