= 2016–17 LNBP season =

- League: Liga Nacional de Baloncesto Profesional
- Sport: Basketball
- Duration: October 13, 2016 – February 11, 2017; February 14 – March 25, 2017 (Playoffs); March 24 – April 3, 2017 (Finals)
- Number of games: 36
- Number of teams: 10
- TV partner(s): interneTV

Regular Season
- Season MVP: Justin Keenan (Import MVP)
- Top scorer: Justin Keenan

Playoffs

Finals
- Champions: Fuerza Regia
- Runners-up: Soles de Mexicali

LNBP seasons
- ← 2015–16 2017–18 →

The 2016–17 LNBP season was the 17th season of the Liga Nacional de Baloncesto Profesional. The regular season began on October 13, 2016 and ended on February 11, 2017. The playoffs began on February 14, 2017 and ended with the 2017 LNBP Finals on April 3, 2017, after Fuerza Regia defeated Soles de Mexicali in six games to win their first LNBP title.

== Regular season ==
=== Standings ===
Pos	Team	Pld	W	L	PF	PA	PD	Pts	Qualification
1	Fuerza Regia	36	32	4	3053	2668	+385	68	LNBP Playoffs
2	Soles	36	23	13	3142	3004	+138	59	LNBP Playoffs
3	Garzas de Plata	36	22	14	2997	2844	+153	58	LNBP Playoffs
4	Toros	36	22	14	3062	2950	+112	58	LNBP Playoffs
5	Panteras	36	19	17	3097	3066	+31	55	LNBP Playoffs
6	Barreteros	36	17	19	2923	3012	−89	53	LNBP Playoffs
7	Indios	36	15	21	2930	3050	−120	51	LNBP Playoffs
8	C.B. Santos	36	14	22	2931	3031	−100	50	LNBP Playoffs
9	Abejas	36	10	26	2871	3095	−224	46	
10	Correcaminos	36	6	30	2854	3140	−286	42	

Source: lnbp.mx

== Playoffs ==
The 2017 LNBP playoffs began on February 14, 2017 and ended with the LNBP Finals on April 3, 2017.

First Round
1	Fuerza Regia	3
8	Santos	0
4	Toros	3
5	Panteras	1
3	Garzas de Plata	3
6	Barreteros	0
2	Soles	3
7	Indios	0

Semifinals
1	Fuerza Regia	4
4	Toros	2
3	Garzas de Plata	2
2	Soles	4

Finals
1	Fuerza Regia	4
2	Soles	2
