= Héctor Hernández (basketball) =

Mexican basketball player (born 1985)

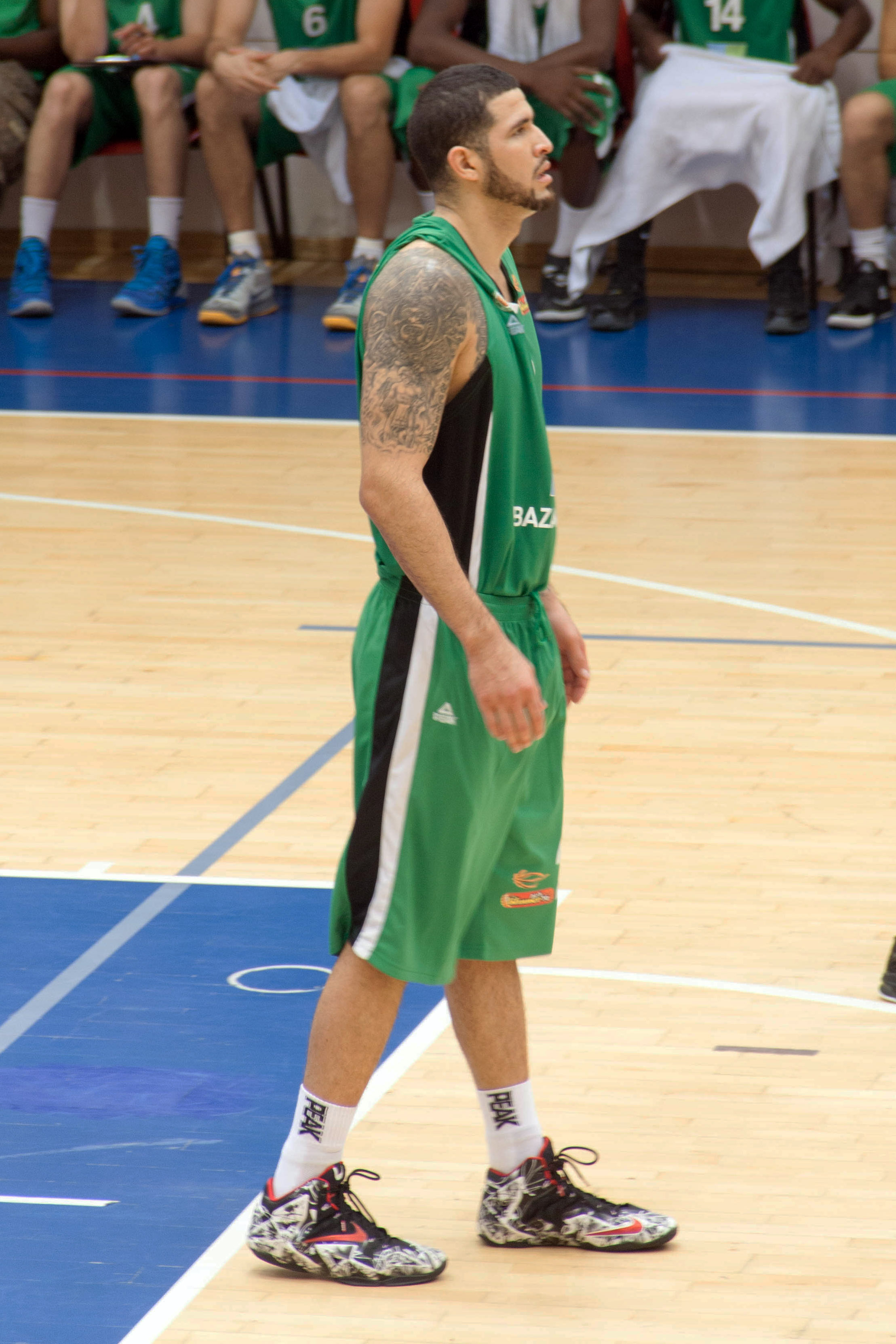
- Hernández with Maccabi Haifa in 2012

Personal information
- Born: 15 June 1985 (age 41) Chihuahua, Mexico
- Listed height: 6 ft 9 in (2.06 m)
- Listed weight: 224 lb (102 kg)

Career information
- High school: Abraham Lincoln (Denver, Colorado)
- College: Fresno State (2004–2008)
- NBA draft: 2008: undrafted
- Playing career: 2008–present
- Position: Power forward / center

Career history
- 2008–2012: Soles de Mexicali
- 2012–2013: Pioneros de Quintana Roo
- 2013: Ostioneros de Guaymas
- 2013–2014: Pioneros de Quintana Roo
- 2014: Atléticos de San Germán
- 2014: Maccabi Haifa
- 2014–2016: Pioneros de Quintana Roo
- 2016: Bucaneros de La Guaira
- 2016–2017: Fuerza Regia de Monterrey
- 2017: Vaqueros de Bayamón
- 2017–2020: Mexico City Capitanes
- 2020–2022: Astros de Jalisco
- 2022–2023: Libertadores de Querétaro

Career highlights
- FIBA Americas League champion (2012); LNBP champion (2016, 2017); LNBP National MVP (2017); LNBP Finals MVP (2016)
Medals
Men's basketball
Representing Mexico
Pan American Games
Silver medal – second place	2011 Guadalajara
FIBA AmeriCup
Gold medal – first place	2013 Venezuela
Bronze medal – third place	2017 Argentina
Centrobasket
Silver medal – second place	2016 Panama
Central American and Caribbean Games
Silver medal – second place	2010 Puerto Rico
FIBA COCABA Championship
Gold medal – first place	2013 El Salvador

Héctor Humberto Hernández Gallegos (born 15 June 1985) is a former Mexican basketball player who last played for Libertadores de Querétaro of the Liga Nacional de Baloncesto Profesional (LNBP) and the Mexico national team. He participated at the 2014 FIBA Basketball World Cup.

Hernández was named the LNBP Finals MVP after leading the Pioneros de Quintana Roo to a league title in 2016. After a stint with the Bucaneros de La Guaira in Venezuela, he signed with the Fuerza Regia de Monterrey for the 2016–17 LNBP season. Hernández won the LNBP National MVP award and led the Fuerza Regia to the 2017 LNBP title.

Hernández signed with the Mexico City Capitanes in August 2017.

Hernández announced his retirement from the Mexico national team on 28 May 2018.
