= Polyforum Dr. Rodolfo Torre Cantú =

Indoor arena located in Nuevo Laredo, Tamaulipas

The Polyforum Dr. Rodolfo Torre Cantú is an indoor arena located in Nuevo Laredo, Tamaulipas. It is currently used mostly for basketball matches. The stadium has a capacity of 5,224 people.
