= Xavier Munford =

American basketball player (born 1992)

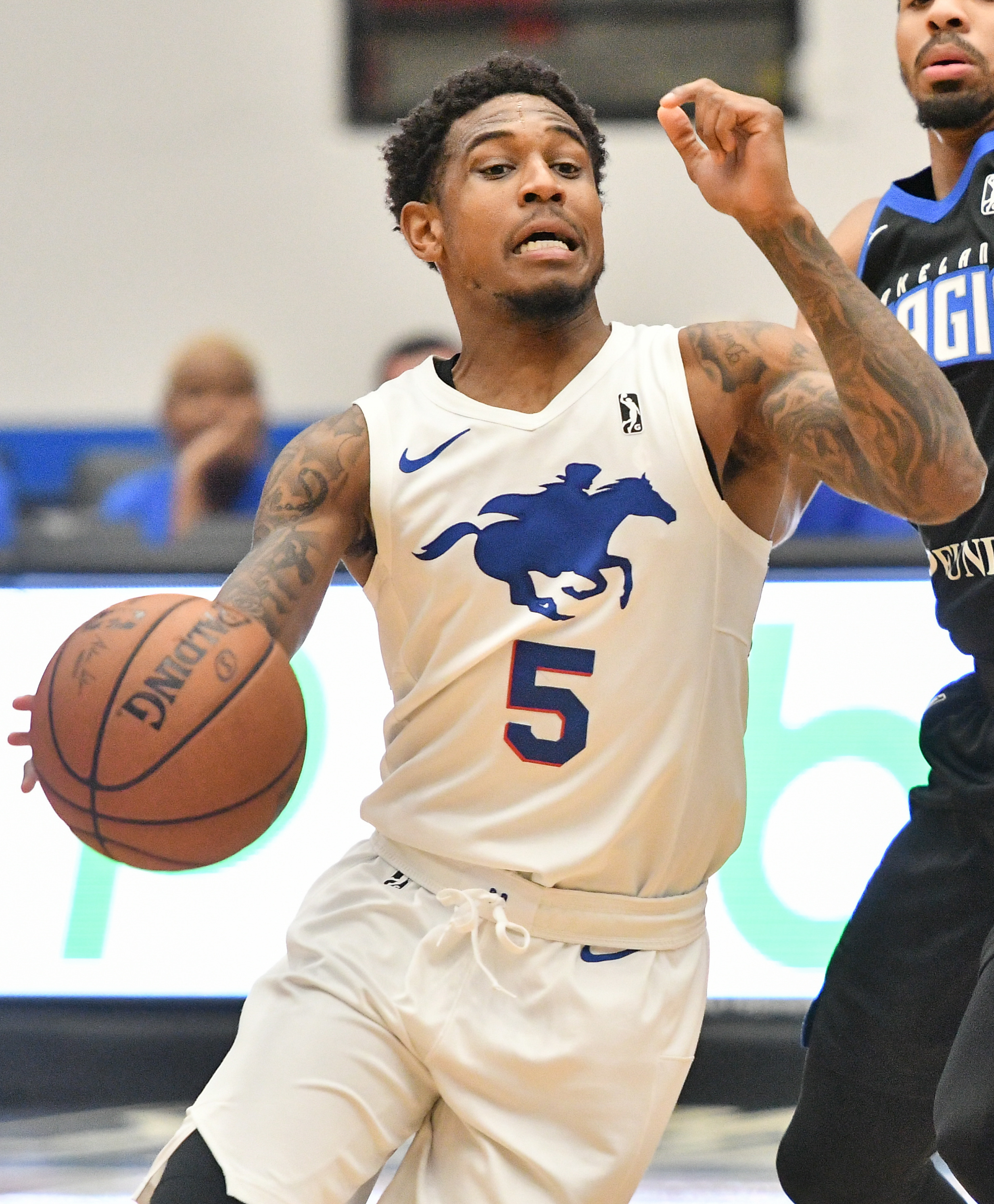

No. 3 – Karşıyaka Basket
- Position: Point guard
- League: Basketbol Süper Ligi

Personal information
- Born: June 1, 1992 (age 34) Hillside, New Jersey, U.S.
- Listed height: 6 ft 4 in (1.93 m)
- Listed weight: 173 lb (78 kg)

Career information
- High school: Saint Benedict's (Newark, New Jersey)
- College: Miami Dade (2010–2011); Iowa Western CC (2011–2012); Rhode Island (2012–2014)
- NBA draft: 2014: undrafted
- Playing career: 2014–present

Career history
- 2014–2016: Bakersfield Jam
- 2016: Memphis Grizzlies
- 2016–2017: Greensboro Swarm
- 2017: FC Barcelona Lassa
- 2017–2018: Wisconsin Herd
- 2018: Milwaukee Bucks
- 2018: →Wisconsin Herd
- 2018: Fujian Sturgeons
- 2019: Wisconsin Herd
- 2019–2020: Delaware Blue Coats
- 2020–2021: Frutti Extra Bursaspor
- 2021–2022: South East Melbourne Phoenix
- 2022–2024: Hapoel Tel Aviv
- 2024–2025: Reyer Venezia
- 2025–2026: Hapoel Holon
- 2026–present: Karşıyaka Basket

Career highlights
- NBA D-League All-Star (2016)
- Stats at NBA.com
- Stats at Basketball Reference
Medals
Men's basketball
Representing United States
FIBA AmeriCup
Gold medal – first place	2017 Argentina

Xavier Tyler Jerome Munford (born June 1, 1992) is an American professional basketball player for Karşıyaka Basket of the Turkish Basketbol Süper Ligi (BSL). He played two seasons of college basketball for the Rhode Island Rams.

== High school career ==
Munford attended Saint Benedict's Preparatory School in Newark, New Jersey. As a senior in 2009–10, he helped the Grey Bees to a 26–1 record and the No. 2 national ranking, while averaging 12 points per game.

== College career ==
As a freshman at Miami Dade College in 2010–11, Munford averaged 17.3 points, 2.8 rebounds, 2.4 assists and 1.5 steals in 32 games. He was subsequently named the FCSAA's Newcomer of the Year and was a First Team All-NJCAA Region 8 selection.

In 2011, Munford transferred to Iowa Western Community College, where as a sophomore in 2011–12, he averaged 16.6 points per game for the Reivers, leading the Iowa Community College Athletic Conference (ICCAC). He helped guide Iowa Western to a 24–9 record en route to the NJCAA Region 11 finals, and was a 2011–12 NJCAA Division I All-American selection.

Following the 2011–12 season, Munford signed a National Letter of Intent to play college basketball for the University of Rhode Island.

As a junior playing for the Rhode Island Rams in 2012–13, Munford was named to the USBWA All-District I team. In 29 games, he averaged 17.4 points (ranked third in the Atlantic 10 Conference), 2.8 rebounds, 1.9 assists and 1.0 steals in 35.4 minutes per game.

As a senior in 2013–14, Munford became the fastest player in school history to reach the 1,000-point plateau, getting there in his final home game for the Rams against Fordham. In 32 games, he averaged 16.9 points, 4.0 rebounds, 2.4 assists and 1.1 steals in 35.6 minutes per game.

== Professional career ==
=== Bakersfield Jam (2014–2016) ===
Munford went undrafted in the 2014 NBA draft. On November 1, 2014, Munford was selected by the Maine Red Claws in the third round of the 2014 NBA Development League Draft. He was later traded to the Bakersfield Jam on draft night. On November 14, he made his professional debut in a 127–125 loss to the Texas Legends, recording seven points, two rebounds, two assists and one steal in 10 minutes. He appeared in 51 games for Bakersfield in 2014–15, averaging 11.5 points, 3.4 rebounds, 2.8 assists and 1.0 steals per game.

=== Los Angeles Lakers (2015) ===
In July 2015, Munford joined the Los Angeles Lakers for the 2015 NBA Summer League. On November 2, he returned to the Jam. On January 29, 2016, he was named in the West All-Star team for the 2016 NBA D-League All-Star Game. In 42 games for the Jam in 2015–16, he averaged 20.5 points, 4.1 rebounds, 6.4 assists and 1.0 steals per game.

=== Memphis Grizzlies (2016) ===
On March 16, 2016, Munford signed a 10-day contract with the Memphis Grizzlies to help the team deal with numerous injuries. Memphis had to use an NBA hardship exemption in order to sign him as he made their roster stand at 18, three over the allowed limited of 15. The next day, he made his NBA debut in a 96–86 loss to the Milwaukee Bucks, recording two points, one rebound and two steals in 11 minutes off the bench. On March 27, he signed a second 10-day contract with the Grizzlies. On April 1, he had a 12-point game against the Toronto Raptors. On April 7, he signed a multi-year contract with the Grizzlies. On June 25, 2016, the Grizzlies parted ways with Munford after they declined to exercise their team option on his contract for the 2016–17 season.

=== Greensboro Swarm (2016–2017) ===
In July 2016, Munford re-joined the Los Angeles Lakers for the 2016 NBA Summer League. On September 26, 2016, he signed with the Los Angeles Clippers, but was later waived on October 12 after appearing in two preseason games. On November 12, he was acquired by the Greensboro Swarm of the NBA Development League.

=== Barcelona Lassa (2017) ===
On February 3, 2017, Munford signed with FC Barcelona Lassa until the end of the season due to the injury problems of the Spanish team. On June 8, 2017, Barcelona announced the end of their contract with Munford.

=== Wisconsin Herd (2017–2018) ===
Munford appeared in two games during the 2017 NBA Summer League for the Golden State Warriors.

On October 5, 2017, Munford signed with the Milwaukee Bucks. Seven days later, he was waived by the Bucks. On October 15, 2017, the Greensboro Swarm traded Munford and a 2018 second-round pick to the Bucks affiliate Wisconsin Herd for their 2017 and 2018 first-round selections.

=== Milwaukee Bucks (2018) ===
On January 7, 2018, Munford signed a two-way contract with the Milwaukee Bucks, meaning throughout the rest of the season that year, he'd split his playing time between the Bucks and the affiliate Herd. The move also resulted in the Bucks converting Sean Kilpatrick to a regular season contract, as well as waiving Joel Bolomboy from the Bucks after previously promoting him to a regular season contract as well.

=== Fujian Sturgeons (2018) ===
On December 23, 2018, Munford was reported to have signed with Fujian Sturgeons, and made his debut on the same day with a double-double, scoring 28 points, ten rebounds, five assists and a block in a 106–95 win over the Shanghai Sharks, but was later reported to be replaced by Eugene Jeter after five days.

=== Return to Wisconsin Herd (2019) ===
On January 28, 2019, the Wisconsin Herd announced that they had signed Munford.

=== Delaware Blue Coats (2019–2020) ===
On October 26, 2019, Munford was named to the training camp roster of the Delaware Blue Coats of the NBA G League. Munford scored 34 points and had seven rebounds, four assists and one steal in a win against the Erie BayHawks on January 25, 2020. On March 4, Munford posted 36 points, six rebounds, four assists and two steals in a 124–108 loss to the Long Island Nets. During the 2019–20 season, Munford averaged 17.9 points, 5.3 rebounds, 5.6 assists and 1.0 steal per game.

=== Bursaspor (2020–2021) ===
On August 2, 2020, Munford signed with Frutti Extra Bursaspor of the Turkish Super League (BSL).

=== S.E. Melbourne Phoenix (2021–2022) ===
On September 1, 2021, Munford signed with the South East Melbourne Phoenix in Australia for the 2021–22 NBL season.

=== Hapoel Tel Aviv (2022–2023) ===
On July 18, 2022, Munford signed with Hapoel Tel Aviv of the Israeli Basketball Premier League.

=== Umana Rayer Venezia (2024–2025) ===
On July 26, 2024, Munford signed with Reyer Venezia of the Lega Basket Serie A.

=== Karşıyaka Basket (2026–present) ===
On August 28, 2026, he signed with Karşıyaka Basket of the Turkish Basketbol Süper Ligi (BSL).

== National team career ==
Munford played with the senior United States national team at the 2017 FIBA AmeriCup, where he won a gold medal.

== NBA career statistics ==
Legend
GP	Games played	GS	Games started	MPG	Minutes per game
FG%	Field goal percentage	3P%	3-point field goal percentage	FT%	Free throw percentage
RPG	Rebounds per game	APG	Assists per game	SPG	Steals per game
BPG	Blocks per game	PPG	Points per game	**Bold**	Career high

=== Regular season ===
Year	Team	GP	GS	MPG	FG%	3P%	FT%	RPG	APG	SPG	BPG	PPG
2015–16	Memphis	**14**	0	**17.4**	**.416**	**.391**	**.500**	**2.2**	**1.6**	**.9**	**.2**	**5.7**
2017–18	Milwaukee	6	0	3.5	.167	.000	**.500**	.2	.7	.2	.0	.5
Career		20	0	13.3	.398	.360	.500	1.6	1.3	.7	.2	4.2

=== Playoffs ===
Year	Team	GP	GS	MPG	FG%	3P%	FT%	RPG	APG	SPG	BPG	PPG
2016	Memphis	4	0	22.3	.321	.125	.000	2.3	2.5	1.5	.8	4.8
Career		4	0	22.3	.321	.125	.000	2.3	2.5	1.5	.8	4.8

== Career statistics ==
=== Domestic leagues ===
Season	Team	League	GP	MPG	FG%	3P%	FT%	RPG	APG	SPG	BPG	PPG
2014-15	Bakersfield Jam	D-League	51	22.2	.523	.321	.779	3.4	2.8	1.0	.3	11.5
2015-16	Bakersfield Jam	D-League	41	33.2	.520	.414	.811	4.2	6.5	1.0	.4	20.4
2016-17	Greensboro Swarm	D-League	30	37.2	.421	.316	.806	4.8	5.3	1.1	0.3	18.5

== Personal life ==
Munford is the son of Zamora and Darren Munford, and has a younger brother, Elijah.
