= Larry Drew II =

American basketball player (born 1990)

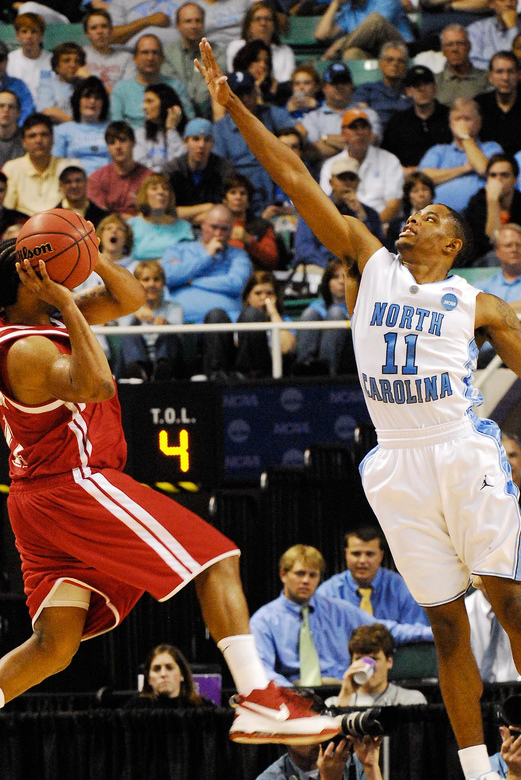
- Drew (right) defending in 2009

Personal information
- Born: March 5, 1990 (age 36) Encino, California, U.S.
- Listed height: 6 ft 2 in (1.88 m)
- Listed weight: 180 lb (82 kg)

Career information
- High school: Taft (Woodland Hills, California)
- College: North Carolina (2008–2011); UCLA (2012–2013)
- NBA draft: 2013: undrafted
- Playing career: 2013–2018
- Position: Point guard
- Number: 7, 27, 1

Career history
- 2013–2015: Sioux Falls Skyforce
- 2015: Philadelphia 76ers
- 2015: Sioux Falls Skyforce
- 2015–2016: AS Monaco
- 2016: Sioux Falls Skyforce
- 2016–2017: Neptūnas Klaipėda
- 2017–2018: Sioux Falls Skyforce
- 2018: Philadelphia 76ers
- 2018: Sioux Falls Skyforce
- 2018: New Orleans Pelicans

Career highlights
- NBA D-League champion (2016); NCAA champion (2009); First-team All-Pac-12 (2013); McDonald's All-American (2008); Third-team Parade All-American (2008)
- Stats at NBA.com
- Stats at Basketball Reference
Medals
Men's basketball
Representing United States
FIBA AmeriCup
Gold medal – first place	2017 Argentina

Larry Donelle Drew II (born March 5, 1990) is an American former professional basketball player. He won the John R. Wooden High School Player of the Year Award in 2008 before starting his college basketball career with the North Carolina Tar Heels. He went on to win a national championship in 2009 with the Tar Heels before deciding to leave the program midseason in 2011. He transferred to the UCLA Bruins' program, where he played one season and broke the single-season school record for assists. Drew was named to the All-Pac-12 first team. He won a gold medal with the United States national team at the FIBA AmeriCup in 2017.

== Early life ==
Drew is the son of Larry Drew, who was a first-round draft pick in the 1980 NBA draft before becoming a head coach in the league. At William Howard Taft High School, Drew won the John R. Wooden High School Player of the Year Award as the 2008 Los Angeles City Section Player of the year and was also a third-team Parade All-American that year. He participated in the 2008 McDonald's All-American Game, where he won the 3-point shooting contest.

== College career ==
=== North Carolina ===
Drew started his collegiate career at University of North Carolina at Chapel Hill. In his freshman year, he averaged 1.4 points, 1.9 assists, 1.2 turnovers, and 1.1 rebounds in 9.6 minutes per game as the Tar Heels won the 2009 National Collegiate Athletic Association (NCAA) Division I championship. He became the starting point guard as a sophomore, replacing Ty Lawson who departed for the NBA. Drew had an up and down season as the Tar Heels struggled to a 20–17 overall record and failed to qualify for the NCAA tournament. However, they did advance to the National Invitation Tournament (NIT) championship game. For the season, Drew averaged 8.5 points per game on 40.2% shooting from the field, with six assists and 2.1 turnovers per game.

On February 3, 2011, Drew left the University of North Carolina's basketball program in the middle of the season. In his last game with the Tar Heels, he had nine assists in 19 minutes in a 106–74 victory over Boston College. He did not cite any reasons, but his playing time, scoring, and assist numbers were all down from the prior season, and freshman Kendall Marshall had supplanted him as starting point guard in mid-January. However, in a freestyle rap in March on his 21st birthday, Drew rapped, "The past three years I can't undo, so now I'm making all the moves that I want to ... They tried to tell me just to play my role, but who's really trying to stick to a script that's full of typos?"

=== UCLA ===
Drew started attending classes at UCLA on March 28, and had to sit out the 2011–12 season before using his final season of eligibility. Drew joined former Tar Heel twins, David and Travis Wear, who also transferred to UCLA.

Drew began the 2012–13 season as the Bruins lone senior player. He was also their only true point guard, a position he shared with freshman Kyle Anderson. In the final game of the regular season, Drew broke Pooh Richardson's school record for most assists in a season. (Note: Drew's record was broken by Lonzo Ball in 2016–17.) Drew was named to the All-Pac-12 first team.

== Professional career ==
=== 2013–14 season ===
After going undrafted in the 2013 NBA draft, Drew joined the Miami Heat for the 2013 NBA Summer League. On September 23, 2013, he signed with the Heat. However, he was later waived by the Heat on October 21. On October 31, he was acquired by the Sioux Falls Skyforce. On November 23, he made his professional debut in a 103–73 win over the Reno Bighorns, recording nine points, three rebounds and six assists in 32 minutes.

=== 2014–15 season ===
In July 2014, Drew re-joined the Heat for the 2014 NBA Summer League. On October 20, he re-signed with the Heat, however they waived him on October 25, when he accepted their assignment back to Sioux Falls. He was officially reacquired by the Skyforce on November 3. He went on to deliver a D-League record 23 assists on December 25 in the 135–129 win over the Rio Grande Valley Vipers.

On January 16, 2015, Drew signed a 10-day contract with the Philadelphia 76ers. On January 26, he signed a second 10-day contract with the 76ers. Hours later, he made his first NBA start against the New Orleans Pelicans; Philadelphia was without starting point guard Michael Carter-Williams, who was out sick, and backup Tony Wroten had been sidelined with a knee injury. League rules limited teams to signing a single player to a maximum of two 10-day deals. Needing to sign Drew to a fully guaranteed contract if they wished to retain him, the team instead signed Tim Frazier to a 10-day contract on February 5, citing the desire for roster "flexibility." On February 6, he returned to the Skyforce.

=== 2015–16 season ===
During the offseason, Drew played for the New Orleans Pelicans during the 2015 NBA Summer League in Las Vegas, where he was named to the All-NBA Summer League Second Team. Following the conclusion of the Summer League, he signed with AS Monaco Basket of the LNB Pro A in France for 2015–16. On March 15, 2016, he parted ways with Monaco after averaging 4.1 points per contest in 18 games.

On March 28, 2016, Drew was reacquired by the Sioux Falls Skyforce. The next day, he made his season debut in a 125–107 win over the Iowa Energy, recording three points, one rebound and two assists in nine minutes off the bench. He helped the Skyforce win the league championship with a 2–1 Finals series win over the Los Angeles D-Fenders.

=== 2016–17 season ===
On August 2, 2016, Drew signed a one-year contract with BC Neptūnas in Lithuania. On February 10, 2017, he parted ways with Neptūnas due to disciplinary issues. On March 2, 2017, Drew was acquired by the Sioux Falls Skyforce.

=== 2017—18 season ===
Drew Joined the Philadelphia 76ers for the 2017 NBA Summer League in Orlando. He later signed with Miami for his third training camp with the Heat. On October 12, he was waived by the Heat.

On January 23, 2018, Drew signed a 10-day contract with the Philadelphia 76ers. In March, he signed two 10-day contracts with the New Orleans Pelicans, but was not re-signed after the team signed former Pelicans guard Jordan Crawford.

== National team career ==
Drew played for the United States national team at the 2017 FIBA AmeriCup, where he won a gold medal. He averaged 4.6 points, 5.0 assists and 1.0 steals per game in the tournament.

== Career statistics ==
Legend
GP	Games played	GS	Games started	MPG	Minutes per game
FG%	Field goal percentage	3P%	3-point field goal percentage	FT%	Free throw percentage
RPG	Rebounds per game	APG	Assists per game	SPG	Steals per game
BPG	Blocks per game	PPG	Points per game	**Bold**	Career high

=== NBA statistics ===
Year	Team	GP	GS	MPG	FG%	3P%	FT%	RPG	APG	SPG	BPG	PPG
2014–15	Philadelphia	**12**	**1**	**18.3**	.345	.154	**.667**	**1.3**	**3.8**	**.5**	.0	**3.8**
2017–18	Philadelphia	3	0	5.0	.143	.000	–	.3	.7	.0	.0	.7
2017–18	New Orleans	7	0	7.9	**.353**	**.500**	–	.3	1.1	.0	.0	2.1
Career		22	1	13.1	.329	.200	.667	.8	2.5	.3	.0	2.9

=== College statistics ===
Year	Team	GP	GS	MPG	FG%	3P%	FT%	RPG	APG	SPG	BPG	PPG
2008–09	North Carolina	**38**	0	9.6	.351	.231	.412	1.1	1.9	.4	.0	1.4
2009–10	North Carolina	37	**36**	28.8	.405	.352	.606	**2.7**	5.9	.8	.0	**8.5**
2010–11	North Carolina	21	17	22.8	.384	.207	**.677**	2.3	3.9	1.1	.0	4.4
2012–13	UCLA	35	35	**35.5**	**.446**	**.433**	.609	2.4	**7.3**	**1.4**	**.2**	7.5
Career		131	88	24.0	.412	.343	.601	2.1	4.8	.9	.1	5.5

== See also ==
- List of second-generation NBA players
