= Javier Carter =

Panamanian professional basketball player

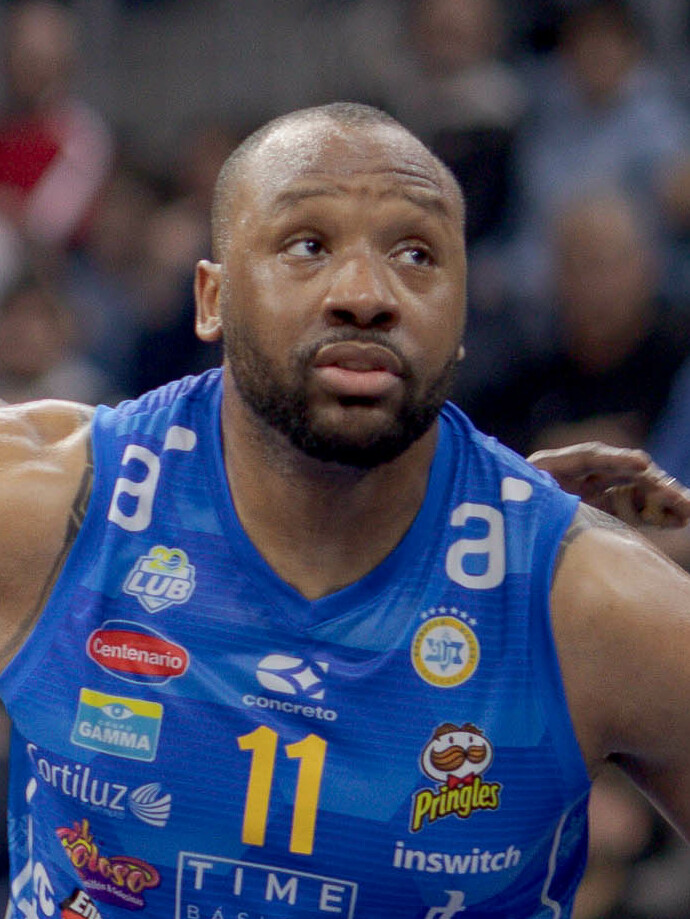

Free agent
- Position: Power forward / center

Personal information
- Born: May 20, 1991 (age 35) Cleveland, Ohio, U.S.
- Listed height: 6 ft 8 in (2.03 m)
- Listed weight: 245 lb (111 kg)

Career information
- High school: Parish Episcopal School (Dallas, Texas)
- College: South Alabama (2009–2013)
- NBA draft: 2013: undrafted
- Playing career: 2013–present

Career history
- 2013–2014: Cáceres Ciudad del Baloncesto
- 2014–2015: CS Gravenchon Basket
- 2015–2016: Bakersfield Jam
- 2016: Panteras de Costa del Este Panama City
- 2016–2017: Club Atlético Welcome
- 2016–2017: Caballos de Coclé Aguadulce
- 2016–2017: Soles de Mexicali
- 2017–2018: CD Valdivia
- 2017–2018: Club Deportivo Hispano Americano
- 2018–2019: Maccabi Kiryat Motzkin
- 2018–2019: Guaros de Lara
- 2019–2021: Akita Northern Happinets
- 2021–2022: Nagasaki Velca
- 2022–2023: Passlab Yamagata Wyverns
- 2023–2024: Akita Northern Happinets
- 2024–2025: Shiga Lakes

Career highlights
- Venezuelan League champion (2018)

Javier Dione Carter (born May 20, 1991), nicknamed Air, is a Panamanian professional basketball player for Shiga Lakes in Japan. Born in the United States, he has competed internationally with the Panama men's national basketball team.

== High school career ==
Carter played high school basketball at Parish Episcopal School of Dallas in Dallas, Texas.

== College career ==
After high school, Carter played college basketball at University of South Alabama, with the South Alabama Jaguars, from 2009 to 2013.

== College statistics ==
Year	Team	GP	GS	MPG	FG%	3P%	FT%	RPG	APG	SPG	BPG	PPG
2009–10	South Alabama	32	17	15.4	.473	.000	.732	3.50	0.22	0.44	0.97	4.19
2010–11	South Alabama	28	16	16.4	.414	.000	.732	3.82	0.36	0.39	1.04	5.25
2011–12	South Alabama	27	20	23.6	.457	.000	.765	5.04	0.67	0.74	2.67	6.11
2012–13	South Alabama	29	24	24.3	.564	.500	.627	6.66	0.59	0.93	2.48	7.10
Career		117	77	19.6	.479	.200	.710	4.70	0.44	0.62	1.74	5.57

== Professional career ==
On October 31, 2015, Carter was selected by the Bakersfield Jam in the fourth round of the 2015 NBA Development League Draft. His plays include the one-hand jam and the reverse alley-oop.

On September 21, 2018, Carter signed with Maccabi Kiryat Motzkin of the Israeli National League. In 32 games played for Kiryat Motzkin, he averaged 18.9 points, 9.0 rebounds, 1.6 assists and 1.2 blocks per game, while shooting 41.5 percent from three-point range. Carter led Kiryat Motzkin to the 2019 Israeli National League Semifinals, where they eventually were eliminated by Hapoel Galil Elyon.

=== Awards and honors ===
- 2013–14 LEB Plata MVP week by week
- Latinbasket.com All-Chilean Liga Nacional Honorable Mention (2018)

== Personal ==
He is a son of Cecilio and Marcia Carter. His father is from Río Abajo, Panama. He is married (2019) to Kandace Carter.

== Career statistics ==
Legend
GP	Games played	GS	Games started	MPG	Minutes per game
FG%	Field goal percentage	3P%	3-point field goal percentage	FT%	Free throw percentage
RPG	Rebounds per game	APG	Assists per game	SPG	Steals per game
BPG	Blocks per game	PPG	Points per game	**Bold**	Career high

†	Denotes seasons in which Carter won a championship

=== Regular season ===
Year	Team	GP	GS	MPG	FG%	3P%	FT%	RPG	APG	SPG	BPG	PPG
2013–14	Cáceres	32	19	20.7	.583	.395	.738	5.56	0.47	0.56	0.94	8.94
2014–15	Gravenchon				.585	.434		13.8			2.1	18.7
2015–16	BAK	41	0	11.8	.445	.353	.780	2.90	0.46	0.29	0.66	3.71
2016	Panteras	1		31.0	.625	.000	.800	11.0	2.0	0.0	3.0	14.0
2016–17	Soles/Cocle	19	7	17.5	.589	.000	.667	4.74	1.21	0.84	0.47	7.05
2016–17	Welcome	13		28.7	.526	.333	.718	8.4	1.2	0.8	1.2	13.4
2017–18	Gallegos	30	28	26.7	.542	.412	.722	8.00	1.00	0.70	1.07	12.57
2017–18	Valdivia	26		34.3	.523	.176	.703	9.5	1.4	0.8	1.4	15.5
2018–19†	Guaros	15	15	24.2	.630	.500	.655	8.13	0.53	0.60	1.27	10.07
2018–19	Kiryat	32		29.4	.528	.415	.727	9.0	1.6	0.8	1.4	18.9
2019–20	Akita	22	21	27.9	.424	.333	.729	8.1	1.9	1.5	0.9	12.0
2020–21	Akita	48	30	26.1	.436	.335	.689	6.3	1.6	1.0	0.9	10.6
2021-22†	Nagasaki	48	46	22.4	.586	.375	.721	6.6	0.9	1.0	1.0	14.0
2022–23	Yamagata	48	15	25.1	.487	.359	.773	6.0	1.9	0.7	1.0	13.6

=== Playoffs ===
Year	Team	GP	GS	MPG	FG%	3P%	FT%	RPG	APG	SPG	BPG	PPG
2013–14	Cáceres	8		24.3	.481	.412	.800	7.8	0.4	0.6	1.1	11.1
2017–18	Gallegos	4		27.5	.538	.200	.500	6.0	1.0	0.0	1.3	12.5

=== FIBA Senior Team Events ===
Year	Team	GP	GS	MPG	FG%	3P%	FT%	RPG	APG	SPG	BPG	PPG
2017	Americas World Cup Qualifier	11		26.39	.567	.500	.741	6.3	1.5	0.7	0.6	11.9
2017	FIBA AmeriCup	3		31.03	.533	.667	.600	8.3	2.0	1.0	1.0	12.3
Career		14		27.35	.558	.524	.719	6.7	1.6	0.8	0.7	12.0

=== Atlas challenge ===
Year	Team	GP	GS	MPG	FG%	3P%	FT%	RPG	APG	SPG	BPG	PPG
2016	USA							8.3			1.5	17

=== Preseason games ===
Year	Team	GP	GS	MPG	FG%	3P%	FT%	RPG	APG	SPG	BPG	PPG
2019	Akita	3	2	21.6	.833	.777	1.000	6.67	3.0	1.00	0.33	13.0

Source: UtsunomiyaToyamaSendai
