= Polideportivo Carlos Martínez Balmori =

Arena in Mineral de la Reforma, Mexico

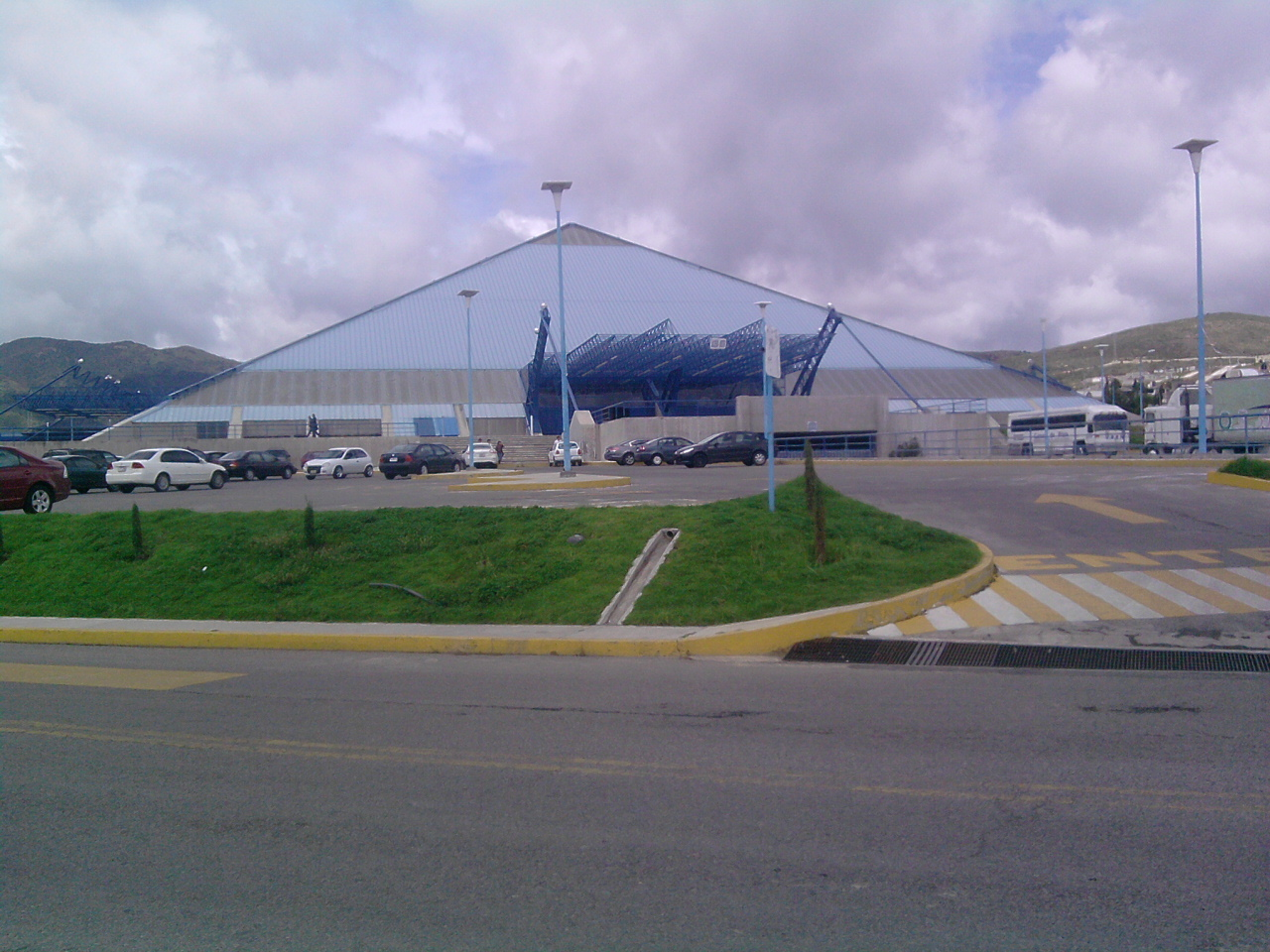
- Interactive map of Polideportivo Carlos Martínez Balmori
- Location: Mineral de la Reforma, Mexico
- Type: Arena
- Events: Sporting events; Concerts; Graduation ceremonies
- Executive suites: 12
- Capacity: 6,000

Construction
- Built: 2001

Tenants
- Universidad Autonoma del Estado de Hidalgo basketball & volleyball teams

Polideportivo Carlos Martinez Balmori is a 6,000-seat indoor arena located in Mineral de la Reforma, Mexico. It was built in 2001. It is home to the Universidad Autonoma del Estado de Hidalgo basketball and volleyball teams.

The arena contains 12 luxury suites. 4 dressing rooms for teams, 2 dressing rooms for referees, and a climbing wall, among other amenities. It is also used for other events such as concerts, lucha libre, graduation ceremonies, other sporting events, and other special events.
