= Lorenzo Mata =

American basketball player (born 1986)

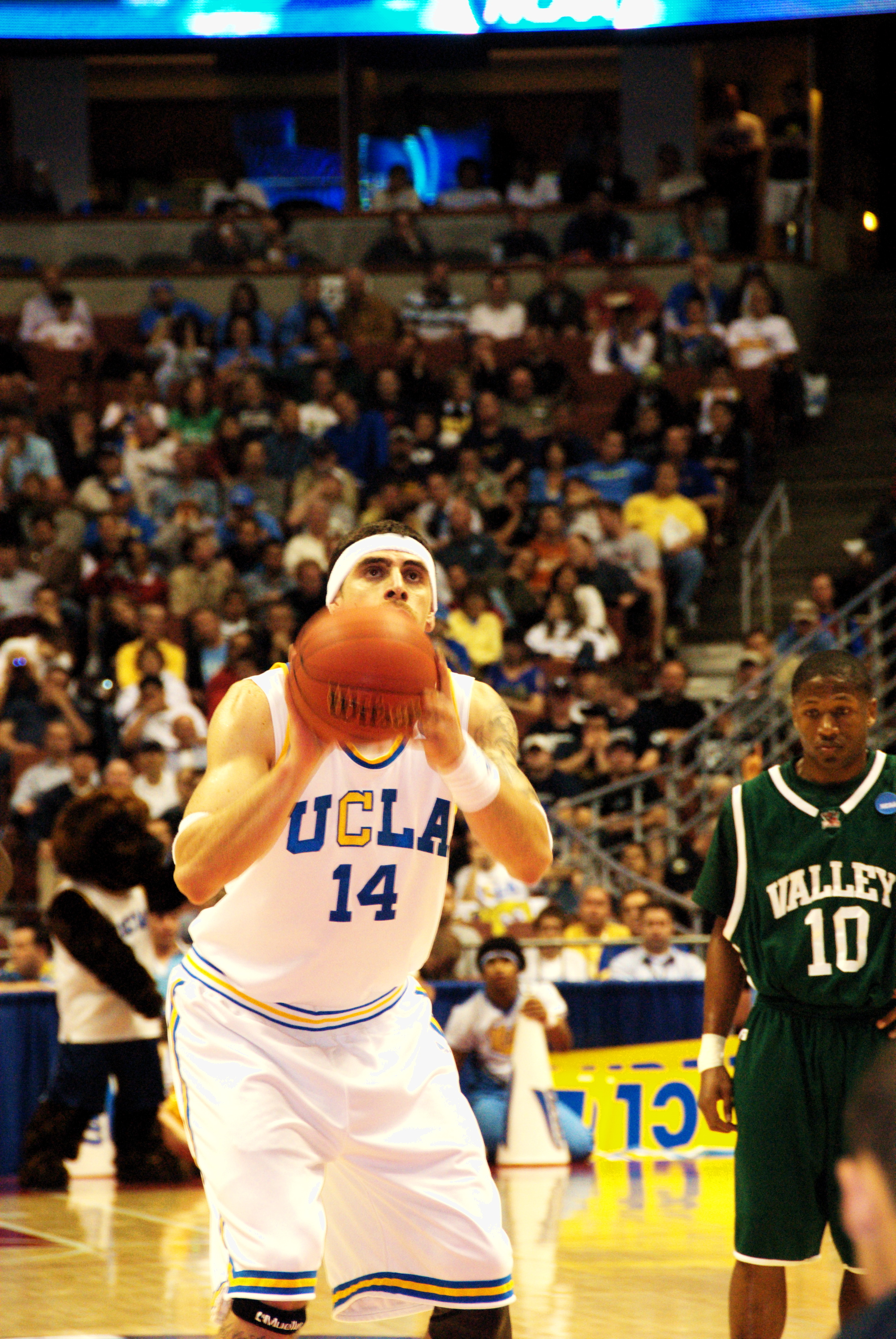

Personal information
- Born: February 27, 1986 (age 40) Huntington Park, California
- Listed height: 6 ft 9 in (2.06 m)
- Listed weight: 240 lb (109 kg)

Career information
- High school: South Gate (South Gate, California)
- College: UCLA (2004–2008)
- NBA draft: 2008: undrafted
- Playing career: 2008–2020
- Position: Center

Career history
- 2008–2010: Halcones UV Xalapa
- 2010: Caballeros de Culiacán
- 2010–2012: Halcones UV Xalapa
- 2012: Pioneros de Quintana Roo
- 2012–2013: Halcones UV Xalapa
- 2013: Piratas de Quebradillas
- 2013–2016: Halcones UV Xalapa
- 2016–2017: Toros de Nuevo Laredo
- 2017–2018: Soles de Mexicali
- 2018–2019: Libertadores de Querétaro
- 2019–2020: Soles de Mexicali
Medals
Men's basketball
Representing Mexico
FIBA AmeriCup
Gold medal – first place	2013 Venezuela
Bronze medal – third place	2017 Argentina

Lorenzo Mata-Real (born February 27, 1986) is an American former professional basketball player. He was the center for the UCLA Bruins men's basketball team from 2004–05 until 2007–08, and was an important part of their final four runs in 2006, 2007, and 2008. Born in the United States, Mata has also played for the Mexico national team.

== High school ==
Mata averaged 25.0 points and 15.0 rebounds in his senior season. He led the South Gate Rams to an 18–8 overall record, an unbeaten Eastern League mark and one playoff victory. In the L.A. City Sectional quarterfinal game, future UCLA teammate Josh Shipp's Fairfax High School team defeated South Gate 89–85. In his junior year he led South Gate to their first playoff victory in 11 years.

== UCLA career ==
Mata was recruited by Ben Howland along with Jordan Farmar, Josh Shipp, and Arron Afflalo to attend UCLA. These four led UCLA to the Final Four in back to back seasons (2005–2006, 2006–2007). His stats improved each year at UCLA, scoring 6.7 points and pulling down 5.5 rebounds while shooting 67% from the floor during his junior year. In his senior season he added his mother's last name (Real) to his jersey.

== Professional career ==
After going undrafted in the 2008 NBA draft, Mata tried out for a team in the Japanese pro league. He then signed onto the Los Angeles Lakers summer league team in order to make a name for himself among NBA scouts. Mata played in the LNBP for the Halcones de Xalapa and for the Mexico National Team, and for Piratas de Quebradillas, with whom he won the 2013 BSN Championship.

In 2013, Mata helped lead Mexico to victory in the gold medal game against Puerto Rico at the FIBA Americas Championship.

== Pan American Games ==
- Pan American Games 2011 Silver Medal

== FIBA AmeriCup ==
- FIBA Americas Championship 2013 Gold Medal

== Centrobasket ==
- Centrobasket 2016 Silver Medal
