= Justin Keenan =

American basketball player

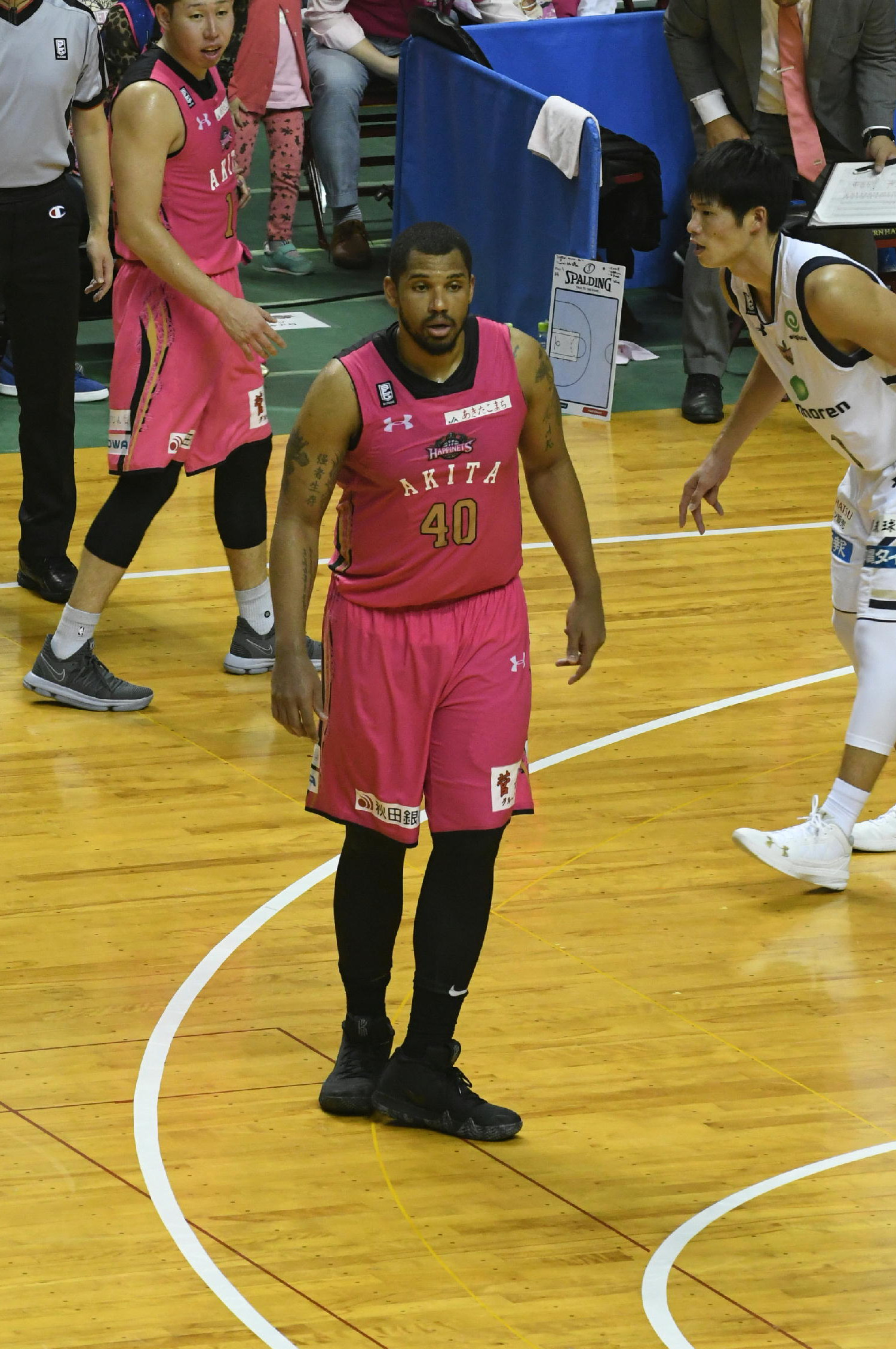
- Keenan with the Akita Northern Happinets in 2018

Free agent
- Position: Power forward / center

Personal information
- Born: May 2, 1989 (age 37) Grand Rapids, Michigan, U.S.
- Listed height: 6 ft 8 in (2.03 m)
- Listed weight: 265 lb (120 kg)

Career information
- High school: East Kentwood; Ottawa Hills (Grand Rapids, Michigan)
- College: Ferris State (2007–2011)
- NBA draft: 2011: undrafted
- Playing career: 2011–present

Career history
- 2011–2012: Institución Atlética Larre Borges
- 2012: Panteras de Miranda
- 2012–2013: Club Trouville
- 2013: Caciques de Humacao
- 2013: Capitanes de Arecibo
- 2013–2014: La Unión de Formosa
- 2014: Maratonistas de Coamo
- 2014–2015: Pioneros de Quintana Roo
- 2015: Maratonistas de Coamo
- 2015–2016: Pioneros de Quintana Roo
- 2016: Indios de Mayagüez
- 2016–2017: Soles de Mexicali
- 2017: Atléticos de San Germán
- 2017–2018: San Martín de Corrientes
- 2018: Santeros de Aguada
- 2018–2020: Akita Northern Happinets
- 2020–2023: Gunma Crane Thunders
- 2023: Halcones de Xalapa
- 2024: Lobos Plateados de la BUAP
- 2024–2025: Shonan United

Career highlights
- B2 League Champion (2021); FIBA Americas League scoring leader (2015); LNB Sixth Man of the Year (2018); BSN scoring leader (2014); LNPB champion (2016); LNBP Extranjero MVP (2017); LNBP scoring leader (2017); 2× LNPB Best 5 (2015, 2017); 2× LUB scoring leader (2013); LUB Best five (2013); 2× GLIAC Player of the Year (2010, 2011); 3× First-team All-GLIAC (2009–2011); 3×-All American (2009–2011); D2 National Player of the Year (2011)

Justin Anthony Keenan (born May 2, 1989) is an American professional basketball player for the Shonan United of the B.League. He plays at the power forward and center positions.

== Early life and high school career ==
Keenan was born in Grand Rapids, Michigan, on May 2, 1989, as the second of three children. He attended Ottawa Hills High School in Grand Rapids, where he was a four-year letterwinner and an all-city selection in football. He was also an all-city selection in basketball and led his team to a 16–4 record while averaging 15 points, 10 rebounds and two assists per game as a senior.

== College career ==
Keenan played college basketball for the NCAA Division II Ferris State Bulldogs. As a freshman, he led his team in points (15.9) and rebounds (6.9) per game. He was named the NCAA Division II National Player of the Year for the 2010–11 season.

=== College statistics ===
Year	Team	GP	GS	MPG	FG%	3P%	FT%	RPG	APG	SPG	BPG	PPG
2007–08	Ferris State	29	27		.539		.778	6.9				15.9
2008–09	Ferris State	26	25	30.8	.546	.200	.759	7.3	1.1	1.2	0.5	20.2
2009–10	Ferris State	29	29	30.8	.551	.100	.689	6.9	1.1	1.2	0.4	20.1
2010–11	Ferris State	32	32	33.0	.553	.500	.685	9.7	1.3	0.8	0.3	21.6

== Professional career ==
Keenan signed with the Institución Atlética Larre Borges in Uruguay in 2011 and averaged 23 points and 11 rebounds per game in his first season, leading the league in scoring. He had a stint with the Panteras de Miranda in Venezuela before returning to Uruguay to join Club Trouville.

Keenan signed with Gunma Crane Thunders on June 29, 2020.

He was named the 2016–17 LNBP Foreign MVP.

On December 20, 2024, Keenan signed with the Shonan United of the B.League.

== Career statistics ==
Legend
GP	Games played	GS	Games started	MPG	Minutes per game
FG%	Field goal percentage	3P%	3-point field goal percentage	FT%	Free throw percentage
RPG	Rebounds per game	APG	Assists per game	SPG	Steals per game
BPG	Blocks per game	PPG	Points per game	**Bold**	Career high

†	Denotes seasons in which Keenan won an championship
*	Led the league

=== Regular season ===
Year	Team	GP	GS	MPG	FG%	3P%	FT%	RPG	APG	SPG	BPG	PPG
2011–12	Institución Atlética Larre Borges	29		**36.9**	.570	.375	.790	**11.2**				23.0*
2011–12	Panteras de Miranda	2	2	29.0	.444	.000	.833	6.00	1.00	**1.50**	0.00	10.50
2012–13	Club Trouville	38		30.9	.540	.350		9.2	1.7	1.3		**26.3***
2012–13	Capitanes de Arecibo	4	1	24.2	.556	.000	.647	8.00	0.00	0.50	**0.75**	12.75
2012–13	Caciques de Humacao	3	3	22.0	.450	.000	.579	9.00	1.00	1.33	0.33	9.67
2013–14	La Union de Formosa	44	44	32.3	.521	.481	.766	8.50	0.95	0.68	0.14	20.05
2013–14	Maratonistas de Coamo	29	29	35.1	.488	.260	.773	7.83	1.66	0.83	0.24	22.17*
2014–15	Pioneros de Quintana Roo-Cancun	53	**53**	25.3	**.624**	.378	.734	6.64	1.09	0.55	0.17	18.00
2014–15	Maratonistas de Coamo	24	14	25.8	.536	.240	.796	6.21	1.04	0.79	0.25	15.96
2015	Pioneros de Quintana Roo-Cancun	8	8	28.5	.602	.364	.711	7.00	1.25	0.75	0.12	19.25*
2015–16†	Pioneros de Quintana Roo-Cancun	52	42	20.1	.594	.344	.791	5.10	1.19	0.90	0.10	13.10
2015–16	Indios de Mayagüez	11	9	20.8	.492	**.500**	.818	3.82	0.55	0.45	0.09	8.36
2016–17	Soles de Mexicali	50	50	31.5	.587	.408	.794	7.74	1.94	1.10	0.24	24.10*
2016–17	Atléticos de San Germán	41	39	28.2	.489	.333	.778	5.37	2.37	0.66	0.29	15.12
2017	Soles de Mexicali	6	6	31.4	.513	.400	**.844**	8.00	2.33	0.50	0.00	21.00
2017–18	Club San Martín de Corrientes	**55**	3	22.2	.502	.321	.768	4.65	0.65	0.71	0.11	15.96
2017–18	Santeros de Aguada	12	12	26.8	.576	.471	**.844**	5.25	1.58	0.83	0.08	17.17
2017	Club San Martín de Corrientes	3	1	20.3	.524	.000	.667	4.33	0.33	0.33	0.00	11.33
2018–19	Akita Happinets	53	52	30.2	.499	.396	.785	8.7	1.5	1.3	0.1	22.8
2019–20	Akita Happinets	26	26	28.5	.482	.348	.815	6.8	2.2	1.9	0.2	21.1
2020–21	Gunma Crane Thunders	51	2	22.5	.546	.338	.766	6.2	2.4	0.6	0.1	17.2
2021–22	Gunma Crane Thunders	45	40	25.8	.472	.421	.754	6.0	**3.5**	1.2	0.1	14.9

=== Playoff games ===
Year	Team	GP	GS	MPG	FG%	3P%	FT%	RPG	APG	SPG	BPG	PPG
2016–17	San German	7		28.7	.567	.412	.636	5.4	2.4	1.0	0.3	14.9
2017–18	San Martin Corrientes	18		19.8	.394	.233	.764	4.4	0.8	0.6	0.1	8.8

=== Early cup games ===
Year	Team	GP	GS	MPG	FG%	3P%	FT%	RPG	APG	SPG	BPG	PPG
2018	Akita	2	1	25:27	.548	.111	.857	10.0	2.0	2.0	0.5	29.5
2019	Akita	2	2	24:35	.519	.167	.786	10.0	2.0	2.0	0.0	20.0

Source: Changwon1Changwon2 Source: UtsunomiyaToyamaSendai

== Personal life ==
Keenan is the son of Vernon Keenan Jr. and Zsa Zsa Keenan. He has his right arm tattooed with the Chinese letters 强者生存 ("The Strong Survive"). He suffered from Wolff–Parkinson–White syndrome in 2012.
