= Fuerza Regia de Monterrey =

- League: LNBP
- Founded: 2001
- History: Fuerza Regia de Monterrey (2001–present)
- Arena: Arena Mobil
- Capacity: 5,000
- Location: Monterrey, Nuevo León, Mexico
- Team colors: Black, yellow and white
- President: Guillermo González Elizondo
- General manager: Eduardo Urdiales
- Head coach: José Neto
- Ownership: Grupo Multimedios
- Championships: 6 (2017, 2019, 2020, 2021, 2023, 2025)
- Website: Official site
Home	Away

The Fuerza Regia de Monterrey (Monterrey Royal Force in English) is a Mexican professional basketball team based in Monterrey, Nuevo Leon, Mexico playing in the Liga Nacional de Baloncesto Profesional (LNBP). They currently play their home games in the Gimnasio Nuevo León.

== Franchise history ==
=== 2007–2008 ===
The team finished second in the 2007–08 LNBP Northern Zone division standings only behind Lobos Grises UAD, but failed to advance to the Northern Zone Finals after losing to the Soles de Mexicali which advanced to the LNBP final.

=== 2016–2017 ===
Fuerza Regia finished first on the league table and qualified to the playoffs. The team won its first championship by defeating Soles de Mexicali 4–2 in the finals.

== International tournaments ==
On December 4, 2007, Fuerza Regia was one of the 16 teams to participate in the first annual FIBA Americas League in Mexicali, Baja California, Mexico that ended on February 9, 2008. Argentina's Peñarol Mar del Plata won the competition and LNBP's Soles de Mexicali were the runner-up, while Fuerza Regia finished in 9th place.

== Honours ==
- Liga Nacional de Baloncesto Profesional: (6)

2017, 2019, 2020, 2021, 2023, 2025

== Logos ==
Fuerza Regia former logo (2001–2015)

== Home arenas ==
- Arena Monterrey (2003–2008)
- Arena Mobil (2008–)

== Players ==
=== Current roster ===
Note: Flags indicate national team eligibility at FIBA-sanctioned events. Players may hold other non-FIBA nationalities not displayed.

Fuerza Regia de Monterrey roster
Players
Coaches

Pos.	No.	Nat.	Name	Ht.	Age
C	0	(United States)	Langston, Wayne	2.00 m (6 ft 7 in)	33 – 26 October 1993
PG	1	(United States)	Ivey, Jimond	1.96 m (6 ft 5 in)	33 – 29 March 1993
SF	2	(United States)	Bejarano, Daniel	1.92 m (6 ft 4 in)	34 – 30 October 1991
PF	3	(Mexico)	Jaimes, Fabián	1.98 m (6 ft 6 in)	34 – 22 September 1992
SG	4	(United States)	Bamforth, Scott	1.88 m (6 ft 2 in)	37 – 12 August 1989
PG	5	(United States)	Hicks, Deshone	1.77 m (5 ft 10 in)	27 – 1 January 1999
SG	6	(Mexico)	Andriassi, Josué	1.85 m (6 ft 1 in)	29 – 12 October 1997
PG	8	(Mexico)	Acosta, Kevin	1.78 m (5 ft 10 in)	33 – 2 November 1992
PF	10	(United States)	Anderson, Alphonso	1.98 m (6 ft 6 in)	29 – 10 October 1997
SG	12	(United States)	Holmes, Avry	1.88 m (6 ft 2 in)	32 – 20 February 1994
SF	13	(Mexico)	Ávalos, Irwin	2.01 m (6 ft 7 in)	35 – 13 June 1991
C	23	(Mexico)	Martínez, Miguel	2.03 m (6 ft 8 in)	30 – 17 June 1996
C	25	(Ukraine)	Konstantynovskyi, Nikita	2.08 m (6 ft 10 in)	25 – 1 January 2001
SF	27	(Panama)	Girón, Daniel	1.88 m (6 ft 2 in)	36 – 29 December 1989

Head coach

- (Brazil) José Neto

Assistant coach(es)

- (Spain) Jordan Toledo
- (Mexico) Ramón Limas

Legend

- (C) Team captain
- Injured

- Roster
Updated: 3 september 2025

== Notable former players ==
Chicago Bulls superstar Dennis Rodman was signed for three games and played for at least thirty minutes.

Fuerza Regia's Jamario Moon was signed by the NBA's Toronto Raptors for the 2007–08 and 2008–2009 season, and later played for other NBA teams. Altogether, he played more than 300 NBA games.

On April 25, 2007, Fuerza Regia signed Sun Mingming, the world's tallest active player at 7' 9".

=== List ===
Note: Flags indicate national team eligibility at FIBA-sanctioned events. Players may hold other non-FIBA nationalities not displayed.

Criteria

To appear in this section a player must have either:

- Set a club record or won an individual award while at the club
- Played at least one official international match for their national team at any time
- Played at least one official NBA match at any time.

- (Mexico) Alonso Izaguirre
- (Mexico) Yahir Malpica
- (Mexico) Michael Strobbe
- (Mexico) / (United States) Juan Toscano-Anderson
- (The Bahamas) Mitchell Johnson
- (China) Sun Mingming
- (United States Virgin Islands) JaJa Richards
- (United States) Samuel Bowie
- (United States) Jordan Glynn
- (United States) Jerome Habel
- (United States) Jamario Moon
- (United States) Dennis Rodman
- (United States) Jeremis Smith

== See also ==
- Liga Nacional de Baloncesto Profesional
- FIBA Americas League
