= FIBA AmeriCup records =

FIBA AmeriCup records are the records that have been attained at the FIBA AmeriCup tournament.

== Most Valuable Players ==
Year	MVP Award Winner
1999	(Canada) Steve Nash
2001	(Argentina) Manu Ginóbili
2003	(Canada) Steve Nash (2×)
2005	(Brazil) Marcelinho Machado
2007	(Argentina) Luis Scola
2009	(Argentina) Luis Scola (2×)
2011	(Argentina) Luis Scola (3×)
2013	(Mexico) Gustavo Ayón
2015	(Argentina) Luis Scola (4×)
2017	(United States) Jameel Warney
2022	(Argentina) Gabriel Deck
2025	(Brazil) Yago dos Santos

== Top scorer by tournament ==
=== Average ===
Year	Top Scorer	Scoring Average
2003	(Mexico) Omar Quintero	21.1
2005	(Brazil) Marcelinho Machado	23.4
2007	(Brazil) Leandro Barbosa	21.8
2009	(Argentina) Luis Scola	23.3
2011	(Argentina) Luis Scola (2×)	21.4
2013	(Argentina) Luis Scola (3×)	18.8
2015	(Argentina) Luis Scola (4×)	21.1
2017	(Venezuela) John Cox	20.3
2022	(Argentina) Gabriel Deck	21.2
2025	(The Bahamas) Franco Miller Jr.	22.7

== Top ten cumulative points scorers ==
Player	Games played	Points Scored	Scoring Average
(Argentina) Luis Scola	81	1,306	16.1
(Uruguay) Esteban Batista	43	716	16.7
(Puerto Rico) Carlos Arroyo	40	623	15.6
(Puerto Rico) Larry Ayuso	46	596	13.0
(Brazil) Leandro Barbosa	29	578	19.9
(Venezuela) Héctor Romero	38	533	14.0
(Dominican Republic) Francisco Garcia	43	503	11.7
(Brazil) Marcelo Huertas	42	499	11.9
(Mexico) Gustavo Ayón	36	488	13.6
(Panama) Jaime Lloreda	35	480	13.7

== Top scorers in a single game ==
Player	Points Scored	Opponent	Year
(Argentina) Esteban Camissasa	51	Mexico	1984
(Brazil) Oscar Schmidt	45	United States	1989
(Brazil) Oscar Schmidt	44	Uruguay	1988
(Brazil) Oscar Schmidt	44	Venezuela	1989
(Brazil) Oscar Schmidt	43	Mexico	1992
(Argentina) Juan Espíl	43	Brazil	1993
(Brazil) Marcelinho Machado	42	Canada	2005
(Uruguay) Horacio López	41	Brazil	1992
(Brazil) Oscar Schmidt	40	Puerto Rico	1988
(Brazil) Oscar Schmidt	40	Cuba	1989

== Players with the most tournaments and games played ==
Player	Number of AmeriCups	Games played	Years played
(Argentina) Luis Scola	9	81	1999, 2001, 2003, 2007, 2009, 2011, 2013, 2015, 2017
(Argentina) Juan Pedro Gutiérrez	5	49	2005, 2007, 2009, 2011, 2013
(Brazil) Guilherme Giovannoni	6	48	2005, 2007, 2009, 2011, 2013, 2015
(Puerto Rico) Larry Ayuso	5	46	2005, 2007, 2009, 2013, 2015
(Brazil) Alex Garcia	5	44	2005, 2007, 2009, 2011, 2013
(Uruguay) Esteban Batista	6	43	2005, 2007, 2009, 2011, 2013, 2017
(Dominican Republic) Francisco Garcia	5	43	2005, 2009, 2011, 2013, 2015
(Brazil) Marcelo Huertas	5	42	2005, 2007, 2009, 2011, 2013
(Canada) Jermaine Anderson	6	41	2005, 2007, 2009, 2011, 2013, 2017
(Venezuela) José Vargas	6	41	2007, 2009, 2011, 2013, 2015, 2017

== Top medalists ==
Player	Gold Medals	Silver Medals	Bronze Medals	Total Medals
(Argentina) Luis Scola	2 (2001, 2011)	4 (2003, 2007, 2015, 2017)	3 (1999, 2009, 2013)	9
(Brazil) Alex Garcia	2 (2005, 2009)	1 (2011)	0	3
(Brazil) Guilherme Giovannoni	2 (2005, 2009)	1 (2011)	0	3
(Brazil) Marcelo Huertas	2 (2005, 2009)	1 (2011)	0	3
(Brazil) Marcelinho Machado	2 (2005, 2009)	1 (2011)	0	3
(Brazil) Tiago Splitter	2 (2005, 2009)	1 (2011)	0	3
(Brazil) Leandro Barbosa	2 (2005, 2009)	0	0	2
(Brazil) Anderson Varejão	2 (2005, 2009)	0	0	2
(Argentina) Juan Pedro Gutiérrez	1 (2011)	2 (2005, 2007)	2 (2009, 2013)	5
(Argentina) Federico Kammerichs	1 (2011)	2 (2005, 2007)	1 (2009)	4
(Argentina) Paolo Quinteros	1 (2011)	2 (2005, 2007)	1 (2009)	4

== Players with the most total medals won ==
Player	Gold Medals	Silver Medals	Bronze Medals	Total Medals
(Argentina) Luis Scola	2 (2001, 2011)	4 (2003, 2007, 2015, 2017)	3 (1999, 2009, 2013)	9
(Argentina) Juan Pedro Gutiérrez	1 (2011)	2 (2005, 2007)	2 (2009, 2013)	5
(Argentina) Federico Kammerichs	1 (2011)	3 (2003, 2005, 2007)	1 (2009)	5
(Argentina) Paolo Quinteros	1 (2011)	2 (2005, 2007)	1 (2009)	4
