= FIBA AmeriCup Top Scorer =

Basketball Award

The FIBA AmeriCup Top Scorer is a FIBA award that is given every four years (previously every two years), to the leading scorer of the FIBA AmeriCup tournament.

== Top scorers ==
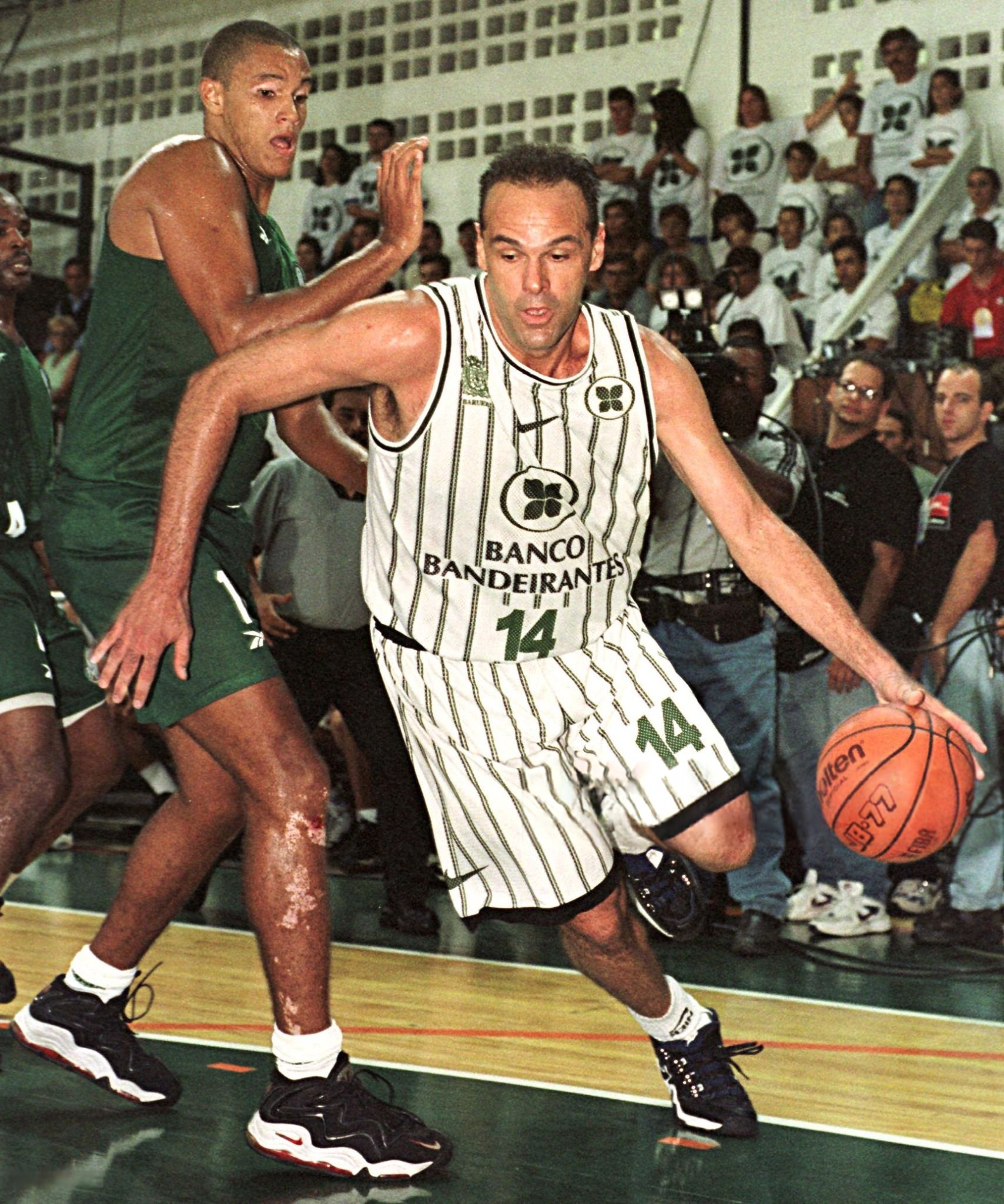
Oscar Schmidt has won the award four times.

=== By total points ===
Year	Player	Position	Team	Points	Ref.
1980	Arturo Guerrero	SG/SF	Mexico	147	
1984	Oscar Schmidt	SG/SF	Brazil	209	
1988	Oscar Schmidt	SG/SF	Brazil	240	
1989	Oscar Schmidt	SG/SF	Brazil	247	
1992	Oscar Schmidt	SG/SF	Brazil	188	
1993	Juan Espil	PG	Argentina	199	
1995	Oscar Schmidt (5×)	SG/SF	Brazil	275	
1997	Víctor Díaz	SF	Venezuela	195	
1999	Gary Payton	SG	United States	149	
2001	Marcelinho Machado	PF	Brazil	172	
2003	Omar Quintero	PG	Mexico	169	
2005	Marcelinho Machado	SG/SF	Brazil	211	
2007	Leandro Barbosa	PG/SG	Brazil	218	
2009	Luis Scola	PF/C	Argentina	233	
2011	Luis Scola (2×)	PF/C	Argentina	214	
2013	Luis Scola (3×)	PF/C	Argentina	188	
2015	Luis Scola (4×)	PF/C	Argentina	211	
2017	Francisco Cruz	SG	Mexico	84	
2022	Gabriel Deck	F	Argentina	127	
2025	Yago dos Santos	PG	Brazil	107	

=== By points per game ===
Year	Player	Position	Team	PPG	Ref.
1980	Arturo Guerrero	SG/SF	Mexico	24.5	
1984	Oscar Schmidt	SG/SF	Brazil	26.1	
1988	Oscar Schmidt	SG/SF	Brazil	30.0	
1989	Oscar Schmidt	SG/SF	Brazil	32.8	
1992	Oscar Schmidt	SG/SF	Brazil	31.3	
1993	Juan Espil	PG	Argentina	28.4	
1995	Oscar Schmidt (5×)	SG/SF	Brazil	27.5	
1997	Víctor Díaz	SF	Venezuela	24.5	
1999	José Ortiz	PF	Puerto Rico	16.9	
2001	Marcelinho Machado	PF	Brazil	23.9	
2003	Omar Quintero	PG	Mexico	21.1	
2005	Marcelinho Machado	SG/SF	Brazil	23.4	
2007	Leandro Barbosa	PG/SG	Brazil	21.8	
2009	Luis Scola	PF/C	Argentina	23.3	
2011	Luis Scola (2×)	PF/C	Argentina	21.4	
2013	Luis Scola (3×)	PF/C	Argentina	18.8	
2015	Luis Scola (4×)	PF/C	Argentina	21.1	
2017	John Cox	SG/SF	Venezuela	20.3	
2022	Gabriel Deck	F	Argentina	21.2	
2025	Franco Miller Jr.	G	Bahamas	22.7	

=== Final - topscorer ===
Year	Player	Position	Team	Points	Ref.
1992	Carl Herrera	SG/SF	Venezuela	21	
1993	Rod Mason	SG/SF	United States	22	
1995	Marcelo Milanesio	PG	Argentina	20	
1997	Corey Beck	PF	United States	18	
1999	Todd MacCulloch	PF	Canada	22	
2001	Emanuel Ginóbili	PF	Argentina	28	
2003	Tim Duncan	PF	United States	23	
2005	Leandro Barbosa	SG	Brazil	29	
2007	LeBron James	PG/SG	United States	31	
2009	Leandro Barbosa (2×)	SG	Brazil	24	
2011	Luis Scola	PF/C	Argentina	32	
2013	Carlos Arroyo; Jovan Harris	SG	Argentina; Mexico	23	
2015	Andres Nocioni	PF	Argentina	21	
2017	Nicolás Brussino	SF	Argentina	26	
2022	Gabriel Deck	F	Argentina	20	
2025	Yago dos Santos	G	Brazil	14	
