= FIBA AmeriCup All-Tournament Team =

Award given as part of FIBA basketball tournaments

The FIBA AmeriCup All-Tournament Team is a FIBA award that is given every four years (previously every two years), and is awarded to the five best players throughout the FIBA AmeriCup tournament.

== Honourees ==
Year	Player	Position	Team	Ref.
2011	Marcelo Huertas	G	Brazil	
2011	Carlos Arroyo	G	Puerto Rico	
2011	Manu Ginóbili	F	Argentina	
2011	Luis Scola	F	Argentina	
2011	Al Horford	C	Dominican Republic	
2013	Facundo Campazzo	G	Argentina	
2013	J. J. Barea	G	Puerto Rico	
2013	Renaldo Balkman	F	Puerto Rico	
2013	Luis Scola (2×)	F	Argentina	
2013	Gustavo Ayón	C	Mexico	
2015	Heissler Guillént	G	Venezuela	
2015	Andrew Wiggins	G	Canada	
2015	Andrés Nocioni	F	Argentina	
2015	Luis Scola (3×)	F	Argentina	
2015	Gustavo Ayón (2×)	C	Mexico	
2017	Facundo Campazzo (2×)	G	Argentina	
2017	Francisco Cruz	G	Mexico	
2017	Darrun Hilliard	F	United States	
2017	Nicolás Brussino	F	Argentina	
2017	Jameel Warney	C	United States	
2022	Yago dos Santos	G	Brazil	
2022	Facundo Campazzo (3×)	G	Argentina	
2022	Norris Cole	G	United States	
2022	Dalano Banton	SF	Canada	
2022	Gabriel Deck	PF	Argentina	
2025	Yago dos Santos (2×)	PG	Brazil	
2025	Javonte Smart	SG	United States	
2025	Kyshawn George	SF	Canada	
2025	Bruno Caboclo	PF	Brazil	
2025	Juan Fernández	C	Argentina	

== See also ==
- FIBA AmeriCup Most Valuable Player
- FIBA Basketball World Cup Most Valuable Player
- FIBA Basketball World Cup All-Tournament Team
- FIBA Awards
