= 2011 FIBA Americas Championship =

Tournament details
- Host country: Argentina
- City: Mar del Plata
- Dates: August 30 – September 11
- Teams: 10
- Venue: 1 (in 1 host city)

Final positions
- Champions: Argentina (2nd title)
- Runners-up: Brazil
- Third place: Dominican Republic
- Fourth place: Puerto Rico

Tournament statistics
- MVP: (Argentina) Luis Scola
- Top scorer: (Argentina) Luis Scola (21.4 points per game)

The 2011 FIBA Americas Championship for Men, later known as the FIBA AmeriCup, was the qualifying tournament for FIBA Americas, at the 2012 Summer Olympics, in London. This FIBA AmeriCup tournament was held in Mar del Plata, Argentina, from August 30 to September 11, 2011. Argentina won the title, defeating Brazil, 80–75, in the final match. This was the country's second AmeriCup championship.

== Host ==
FIBA Americas named Mar del Plata, Argentina the host of the 2011 competition on May 24, 2010 at a meeting in San Juan. Games were played at Polideportivo Islas Malvinas, which seats more than 8,000 fans. Toronto and Rio de Janeiro also bid for the tournament before FIBA awarded the competition to then world number-one ranked Argentina. Toronto was eliminated in the first round of voting before Mar del Plata beat Rio de Janeiro in the final round 13 votes to 3.

== Venue ==
Mar del Plata	2011 FIBA Americas Championship (Argentina)
Polideportivo Islas Malvinas	2011 FIBA Americas Championship (Argentina)
Capacity: 8,000	2011 FIBA Americas Championship (Argentina)

== Qualification ==
The ten teams originally selected to receive invitations for the tournament were the host team, the top three finishers at the 2010 South American Basketball Championship, the top two teams in the North America Sub-Zone, and the top four finishers at 2010 Centrobasket. Because the host country, Argentina, came in second at the 2010 South American Basketball Championship, the fourth place team (Venezuela) at the championship was also invited. After the United States (the only team other than Canada in the North America Sub-Zone) automatically qualified for the 2012 Summer Olympics by winning the 2010 FIBA World Championship, they withdrew from the tournament. The fifth place team at the 2010 South American Basketball Championship (Paraguay) was then invited to participate.

Below is the final list of participants in the tournament:

- South American Sub-Zone (South American Basketball Championship 2010):
  - Argentina
  - Brazil
  - Uruguay
  - Venezuela
  - Paraguay
- North America Sub-Zone:
  - Canada
- Central American and Caribbean Zone (2010 Centrobasket):
  - Cuba
  - Dominican Republic
  - Panama
  - Puerto Rico

== NBA lockout ==
Due to the 2011 NBA lockout, insurance costs for players affiliated with teams of the National Basketball Association to play overseas would no longer be afforded by the league and would have to be taken care of by their corresponding national federations. Some national teams, such as the host nation Argentina and Puerto Rico took steps to resolve the issue. Below is a list of players whose participation in the tournament was at least potentially affected:

- Argentina
  - Carlos Delfino (Milwaukee Bucks)
  - Manu Ginóbili (San Antonio Spurs)
  - Andrés Nocioni (Philadelphia 76ers)
  - Luis Scola (Houston Rockets)
- Brazil
  - Leandro Barbosa^{[a]} (Toronto Raptors)
  - Nenê Hilário^{[d]} (Denver Nuggets)
  - Tiago Splitter (San Antonio Spurs)
  - Anderson Varejão^{[e]} (Cleveland Cavaliers)
- Canada
  - Joel Anthony (Miami Heat)
  - Steve Nash^{[b]} (Phoenix Suns)
  - Andy Rautins (New York Knicks)
  - Tristan Thompson^{[c]} (Cleveland Cavaliers)
  - Jamaal Magloire^{[c]} (Miami Heat)
- Dominican Republic
  - Francisco García (Sacramento Kings)
  - Al Horford (Atlanta Hawks)
  - Charlie Villanueva (Detroit Pistons)
- Panama
  - Gary Forbes (Denver Nuggets)
- Puerto Rico
  - Carlos Arroyo (Boston Celtics)
  - Renaldo Balkman (New York Knicks)
  - José Juan Barea (Dallas Mavericks)
- Venezuela
  - Greivis Vásquez (Memphis Grizzlies)

Notes:

- ^{a} Barbosa decided not to participate in the tournament.
- ^{b} Nash has retired from international play.
- ^{c} Thompson and Magloire were not called up for Canada's national team.
- ^{d} Nenê decided not to participate in the tournament.
- ^{e} Varejão was unavailable for the tournament due to injury.

== Format ==
The ten teams are split into two groups. The best four teams of each group advance to the second round, where the teams play against the four teams from the other group; each team carries over all points earned during the first round, except for those earned in the match against the team that was eliminated. The best four teams of this group advance to the semifinals.

The two winners in the semifinals automatically qualify for the Olympics. The remaining three teams from the second round plus seven teams from other continents play the 2012 FIBA World Olympic Qualifying Tournament, where the top three qualify for the Olympics.

== Draw ==
The draw took place on January 27, 2011 at the NH Gran Hotel Provincial in Mar del Plata. Notable ESPN Latin America announcer Álvaro Martin conducted the ceremony while FIBA Americas Secretary General Alberto Garcia and a number of sports figures drew the teams. The ten participating squads were paired in five pots, where the first draw from each pot would go to Group A and the second to Group B. Teams were paired according to their world rankings for balance purposes. Being the host, Argentina had the opportunity to choose their group.

Pot 1	Pot 2	Pot 3	Pot 4	Pot 5
Argentina (3); Brazil (16)	Canada (23); Puerto Rico (15)	Dominican Republic (30); Uruguay (25)	Panama (28); Venezuela (22)	Cuba (NR); Paraguay (NR)

Note

- NR – Not Ranked

== Preliminary round ==
=== Group A ===
Team	Pld	W	L	PF	PA	PD	Pts	Tie
Dominican Republic	4	3	1	333	296	+37	7	1–0
Brazil	4	3	1	328	302	+26	7	0–1
Venezuela	4	2	2	381	351	+30	6	1–0
Canada	4	2	2	312	306	+6	6	0–1
Cuba	4	0	4	274	373	−99	4	

All times local (UTC−3)

August 30
11:30

Boxscore

Dominican Republic	90–60	Cuba
Scoring by quarter: 18–8, 20–11, 31–18, 21–23
Pts: Horford 24; Rebs: Martínez 10; Asts: Flores, García 3		Pts: Luis Haiti 18; Rebs: Luis Haiti 8 Asts: Mestre 4

Polideportivo Islas Malvinas, Mar del Plata

August 30
14:00

Boxscore

Brazil	92–83	Venezuela
Scoring by quarter: 25–26, 14–18, 27–25, 26–14
Pts: Splitter 17; Rebs: Splitter 11; Asts: Huertas 7		Pts: Vásquez 26; Rebs: Graterol 8 Asts: Vásquez 7

Polideportivo Islas Malvinas, Mar del Plata

August 31
11:30

Boxscore

Venezuela	89–92	Dominican Republic
Scoring by quarter: 26–22, 23–19, 25–22, 15–29
Pts: Torres 19; Rebs: Vásquez 10; Asts: Vásquez 9		Pts: Horford 19; Rebs: Martínez 14; Asts: Horford 4

Polideportivo Islas Malvinas, Mar del Plata

August 31
20:30

Boxscore

Canada	57–69	Brazil
Scoring by quarter: 17–12, 11–21, 18–14, 11–22
Pts: Anderson 9 Rebs: Anthony 9 Asts: Doornekamp 3		Pts: Huertas 17; Rebs: Splitter 10; Asts: Huertas 6

Polideportivo Islas Malvinas, Mar del Plata

September 1
14:00

Boxscore

Cuba	69–106	Venezuela
Scoring by quarter: 13–34, 20–23, 15–25, 21–24
Pts: Mestre 26; Rebs: Luis Haiti 8 Asts: Piñeiro 3		Pts: Vásquez 21; Rebs: Graterol 8 Asts: Cubillan 4

Polideportivo Islas Malvinas, Mar del Plata

September 1
18:00

Boxscore

Dominican Republic	72–73	Canada
Scoring by quarter: 16–19, 14–11, 14–21, 28–22
Pts: Martínez 21; Rebs: Martínez 16; Asts: Horford 3		Pts: Rautins 15; Rebs: Anthony 10; Asts: Joseph 4

Polideportivo Islas Malvinas, Mar del Plata

September 2
11:30

Boxscore

Canada	84–62	Cuba
Scoring by quarter: 22–7, 16–13, 16–20, 30–22
Pts: Shepherd 13; Rebs: Rautins, Anthony 5 Asts: Rautins, Doornekamp 3		Pts: Polas 14; Rebs: Luis Haiti 7 Asts: Mestre 3

Polideportivo Islas Malvinas, Mar del Plata

September 2
18:00

Boxscore

Brazil	74–79	Dominican Republic
Scoring by quarter: 18–17, 21–26, 21–18, 14–18
Pts: Vinicius 18; Rebs: Splitter 10; Asts: Huertas 5		Pts: Horford 22; Rebs: Martínez 10; Asts: Flores 5

Polideportivo Islas Malvinas, Mar del Plata

September 3
11:30

Boxscore

Venezuela	103–98 (OT)	Canada
Scoring by quarter: 23–21, 17–17, 22–25, 22–21, Overtime: 19–14
Pts: Vásquez 29; Rebs: Echenique 10; Asts: Cubillan 10		Pts: Anderson 28; Rebs: Anthony 9 Asts: Anderson 3

Polideportivo Islas Malvinas, Mar del Plata

September 3
18:00

Boxscore

Cuba	83–93	Brazil
Scoring by quarter: 20–26, 17–26, 14–21, 32–20
Pts: Luis Haiti 27; Rebs: Luis Haiti 11; Asts: Luis Haiti 4		Pts: Benite 19; Rebs: Hettsheimeir, Giovannoni 6 Asts: Huertas 6

Polideportivo Islas Malvinas, Mar del Plata

=== Group B ===
Team	Pld	W	L	PF	PA	PD	Pts
Argentina	4	4	0	341	248	+93	8
Puerto Rico	4	3	1	348	266	+82	7
Uruguay	4	2	2	271	287	−16	6
Panama	4	1	3	287	352	−65	5
Paraguay	4	0	4	259	353	−94	4

All times local (UTC−3)

August 30
18:00

Boxscore

Paraguay	52–84	Argentina
Scoring by quarter: 8–27, 15–18, 17–24, 12–15
Pts: Araujo 18; Rebs: Fabio 9 Asts: Martínez, Zanotti 3		Pts: Quinteros 19; Rebs: Gutiérrez 8 Asts: Prigioni 4

Polideportivo Islas Malvinas, Mar del Plata

August 30
20:30

Boxscore

Panama	66–99	Puerto Rico
Scoring by quarter: 8–18, 20–23, 18–25, 20–33
Pts: Lloreda, Garcés 16; Rebs: Garcés 10; Asts: Pinnock, Forbes 2		Pts: Carmona 16; Rebs: Álamo 7 Asts: Arroyo 7

Polideportivo Islas Malvinas, Mar del Plata

August 31
14:00

Boxscore

Puerto Rico	101–55	Paraguay
Scoring by quarter: 15–10, 30–20, 30–12, 26–13
Pts: Carmona 19; Rebs: Barea 8 Asts: Barea 6		Pts: Araujo 18; Rebs: Fabio 11; Asts: Fabio 2

Polideportivo Islas Malvinas, Mar del Plata

August 31
18:00

Boxscore

Argentina	86–51	Uruguay
Scoring by quarter: 25–7, 28–12, 21–11, 12–21
Pts: Scola 18; Rebs: Nocioni 10; Asts: Sánchez 5		Pts: Fitipaldo 11; Rebs: Batista 10; Asts: Vázquez 2

Polideportivo Islas Malvinas, Mar del Plata

September 1
11:30

Boxscore

Paraguay	86–89	Panama
Scoring by quarter: 19–23, 25–17, 11–30, 31–19
Pts: Martínez 36; Rebs: Araujo 8 Asts: Pérez, Martínez 5		Pts: Lloreda 29; Rebs: Lloreda, Garcés 10; Asts: Pinnock 4

Polideportivo Islas Malvinas, Mar del Plata

September 1
20:30

Boxscore

Uruguay	64–74	Puerto Rico
Scoring by quarter: 12–15, 17–21, 18–16, 17–22
Pts: three players 16; Rebs: Batista 12; Asts: García Morales 4		Pts: Arroyo 19; Rebs: Santiago 11; Asts: three players 3

Polideportivo Islas Malvinas, Mar del Plata

September 2
14:00

Boxscore

Panama	61–77	Uruguay
Scoring by quarter: 13–14, 16–16, 14–23, 18–24
Pts: Forbes 19; Rebs: Garcés 11; Asts: Pinnock 4		Pts: Batista 24; Rebs: Batista 10; Asts: García Morales 5

Polideportivo Islas Malvinas, Mar del Plata

September 2
20:30

Boxscore

Puerto Rico	74–81	Argentina
Scoring by quarter: 18–21, 18–13, 14–28, 24–19
Pts: Arroyo 24; Rebs: Santiago 8 Asts: Barea 4		Pts: Ginóbili 23; Rebs: Scola, Nocioni 7 Asts: Prigioni 8

Polideportivo Islas Malvinas, Mar del Plata

September 3
14:00

Boxscore

Uruguay	79–66	Paraguay
Scoring by quarter: 21–20, 20–18, 21–9, 17–19
Pts: García Morales 19; Rebs: Batista 16; Asts: Barrera 4		Pts: Martínez 18; Rebs: Fabio 14; Asts: Pérez, Martínez 3

Polideportivo Islas Malvinas, Mar del Plata

September 3
20:00

Boxscore

Argentina	90–71	Panama
Scoring by quarter: 21–20, 17–19, 26–12, 26–20
Pts: Scola 19; Rebs: Scola 14; Asts: Ginóbili 8		Pts: Lloreda 20; Rebs: Garcés 17; Asts: Pinnock, Forbes 2

Polideportivo Islas Malvinas, Mar del Plata

== Second round ==
Advanced to semifinals
Qualified for 2012 FIBA World Olympic Qualifying Tournament
Eliminated in Second Round

Team	Pld	W	L	PF	PA	PD	Pts	Tie
Brazil	7	6	1	585	493	+92	13	1–0
Argentina	7	6	1	602	473	+129	13	0–1
Puerto Rico	7	5	2	571	523	+48	12	
Dominican Republic	7	4	3	539	543	−4	11	
Venezuela	7	3	4	652	641	+11	10	
Canada	7	2	5	514	561	−47	9	
Uruguay	7	1	6	482	560	−78	8	1–0
Panama	7	1	6	496	647	−151	8	0–1

All times local (UTC−3)

September 5
11:30

Report

Dominican Republic	92–68	Panama
Scoring by quarter: 21–17, 23–13, 31–19, 17–19
Pts: Flores 17; Rebs: Martínez 14; Asts: Sosa 8		Pts: Pinnock 23; Rebs: Garcés 12; Asts: Pinnock 4

Polideportivo Islas Malvinas, Mar del Plata

September 5
14:00

Report

Venezuela	82–94	Puerto Rico
Scoring by quarter: 19–18, 17–26, 21–31, 25–19
Pts: Sucre 18; Rebs: Echenique 8 Asts: Vásquez, Cubillan 4		Pts: Santiago 22; Rebs: Sánchez 8 Asts: Arroyo 6

Polideportivo Islas Malvinas, Mar del Plata

September 5
18:00

Report

Canada	53–79	Argentina
Scoring by quarter: 9–21, 13–16, 21–17, 10–25
Pts: Olynyk 19; Rebs: Olynyk 12; Asts: four players 1		Pts: Scola 22; Rebs: Jasen 7 Asts: Ginóbili, Prigioni 5

Polideportivo Islas Malvinas, Mar del Plata

September 5
20:30

Report

Brazil	93–66	Uruguay
Scoring by quarter: 25–16, 17–18, 28–12, 23–20
Pts: Benite 21; Rebs: Splitter 8 Asts: Huertas 6		Pts: Vázquez 12; Rebs: Batista 5 Asts: Barrera 7

Polideportivo Islas Malvinas, Mar del Plata

September 6
11:30

Report

Puerto Rico	79–74	Canada
Scoring by quarter: 22–21, 20–8, 20–18, 17–27
Pts: Arroyo 26; Rebs: Barea, Galindo 5 Asts: Barea 6		Pts: Rautins 18; Rebs: Olynyk 6 Asts: Doornekamp 5

Polideportivo Islas Malvinas, Mar del Plata

September 6
14:00

Report

Uruguay	76–84	Dominican Republic
Scoring by quarter: 25–19, 17–25, 18–17, 16–23
Pts: Osimani 22; Rebs: Newsome, Batista 7 Asts: Osimani 6		Pts: Horford 23; Rebs: Horford 14; Asts: Horford 5

Polideportivo Islas Malvinas, Mar del Plata

September 6
18:00

Report

Argentina	111–93	Venezuela
Scoring by quarter: 30–20, 21–23, 28–29, 32–21
Pts: Ginóbili 26; Rebs: Nocioni 7 Asts: Prigioni 6		Pts: Romero 21; Rebs: Vásquez, Sucre 5 Asts: Vásquez 10

Polideportivo Islas Malvinas, Mar del Plata

September 6
20:30

Report

Panama	65–90	Brazil
Scoring by quarter: 13–20, 15–24, 18–26, 19–20
Pts: Pinnock 20; Rebs: Garcés 11; Asts: three players 1		Pts: Giovannoni 17; Rebs: Torres 6 Asts: Huertas 6

Polideportivo Islas Malvinas, Mar del Plata

September 7
11:30

Report

Canada	70–68	Uruguay
Scoring by quarter: 19–17, 22–10, 15–22, 14–19
Pts: Kendall 19; Rebs: Kendall 11; Asts: five players 2		Pts: García Morales 19; Rebs: Batista 8 Asts: Osimani 3

Polideportivo Islas Malvinas, Mar del Plata

September 7
14:00

Report

Venezuela	110–74	Panama
Scoring by quarter: 29–23, 21–9, 30–19, 30–23
Pts: Vásquez 24; Rebs: Sucre, Echenique 6 Asts: Vásquez 8		Pts: Ayarza 30; Rebs: Garcés 7 Asts: Forbes 3

Polideportivo Islas Malvinas, Mar del Plata

September 7
18:00

Report

Brazil	73–71	Argentina
Scoring by quarter: 19–17, 8–11, 26–19, 20–24
Pts: Hettsheimeir 19; Rebs: three players 8 Asts: Splitter 3		Pts: Scola 24; Rebs: Scola 11; Asts: Prigioni 5

Polideportivo Islas Malvinas, Mar del Plata

September 7
20:30

Report

Dominican Republic	62–79	Puerto Rico
Scoring by quarter: 15–16, 8–13, 19–24, 20–26
Pts: Horford 16; Rebs: Horford, Martínez 9 Asts: Flores 4		Pts: Galindo 16; Rebs: Narvaez 7 Asts: Barea 7

Polideportivo Islas Malvinas, Mar del Plata

September 8
11:30

Report

Panama	91–89	Canada
Scoring by quarter: 24–27, 25–21, 21–22, 21–19
Pts: Forbes 39; Rebs: Garcés 12; Asts: Forbes 6		Pts: English 24; Rebs: Kendall 7 Asts: Rautins 3

Polideportivo Islas Malvinas, Mar del Plata

September 8
14:00

Report

Uruguay	80–92	Venezuela
Scoring by quarter: 23–23, 14–19, 21–25, 22–25
Pts: Batista 22; Rebs: Batista 8 Asts: Barrera 11		Pts: Romero 23; Rebs: Torres 7 Asts: Cubillan 4

Polideportivo Islas Malvinas, Mar del Plata

September 8
18:00

Report

Argentina	84–58	Dominican Republic
Scoring by quarter: 17–14, 22–19, 19–16, 26–9
Pts: Scola 25; Rebs: Kammerichs 9 Asts: Prigioni 6		Pts: Horford 16; Rebs: Martínez 11; Asts: García 2

Polideportivo Islas Malvinas, Mar del Plata

September 8
20:30

Report

Puerto Rico	72–94	Brazil
Scoring by quarter: 15–29, 15–18, 19–30, 23–15
Pts: Álamo, Balkman 15; Rebs: Álamo 6 Asts: four players 2		Pts: Vinicius 18; Rebs: Giovannoni 7 Asts: Garcia 4

Polideportivo Islas Malvinas, Mar del Plata

== Final round ==
Semi-finals
September 10
Brazil	83
Dominican Republic	76
September 10
Argentina	81
Puerto Rico	79

Final
September 11
Brazil	75
Argentina	80
Third place
September 11
Dominican Republic	103
Puerto Rico	89

=== Semifinals ===
September 10
19:00

Report

Brazil	83–76	Dominican Republic
Scoring by quarter: 18–17, 21–19, 23–19, 21–21
Pts: Machado 20; Rebs: Hettsheimeir 8 Asts: Huertas 7		Pts: Horford, Martínez 18; Rebs: Martínez 15; Asts: four players 1

Polideportivo Islas Malvinas, Mar del Plata

September 10
21:15

Report

Argentina	81–79	Puerto Rico
Scoring by quarter: 29–24, 11–20, 26–16, 15–19
Pts: Scola 27; Rebs: Kammerichs, Delfino 8 Asts: Ginóbili 7		Pts: Barea 20; Rebs: Balkman 12; Asts: Barea 3

Polideportivo Islas Malvinas, Mar del Plata

=== Third place game ===
September 11
19:00

Report

Dominican Republic	103–89	Puerto Rico
Scoring by quarter: 27–12, 26–17, 27–39, 23–21
Pts: Horford 23; Rebs: Horford 12; Asts: Horford 7		Pts: Santiago 25; Rebs: Santiago 6 Asts: Arroyo 7

Polideportivo Islas Malvinas, Mar del Plata

=== Final ===
September 11
21:15

Report

Brazil	75–80	Argentina
Scoring by quarter: 9–21, 18–14, 21–15, 27–30
Pts: Vinicius 17; Rebs: Giovannoni 7 Asts: Splitter 3		Pts: Scola 32; Rebs: Delfino 9 Asts: Scola 4

Polideportivo Islas Malvinas, Mar del Plata

== Awards ==
2011 Tournament of the Americas winners

Argentina
Second title

== Statistical leaders ==
=== Individual Tournament Highs ===
Points

Pos.	Name	PPG
1	(Argentina) Luis Scola	21.4
2	(Venezuela) Greivis Vásquez	19.3
3	(Dominican Republic) Al Horford	19.0
4	(Panama) Gary Forbes	16.6
5	(Argentina) Manu Ginóbili	15.8
6	(Panama) Rubén Garcés	15.9
7	(Panama) Jaime Lloreda	15.9
8	(Puerto Rico) Carlos Arroyo	15.0
9	(Dominican Republic) Jack Michael Martínez	14.5
10	(Venezuela) David Cubillan	13.1

Rebounds

Pos.	Name	RPG
1	(Dominican Republic) Jack Michael Martínez	12.1
2	(Panama) Rubén Garcés	11.3
3	(Paraguay) José Manuel Fabio	9.8
4	(Uruguay) Esteban Batista	9.5
5	(Dominican Republic) Al Horford	9.2
6	(Brazil) Tiago Splitter	6.6
7	(Argentina) Andrés Nocioni	6.5
8	(Argentina) Luis Scola	6.3
9	(Panama) Jaime Lloreda	6.1
10	(Venezuela) Windi Graterol	5.4

Assists

Pos.	Name	APG
1	(Venezuela) Greivis Vásquez	5.8
2	(Brazil) Marcelinho Huertas	5.0
3	(Argentina) Pablo Prigioni	4.7
4	(Venezuela) David Cubillan	4.9
5	(Puerto Rico) José Juan Barea	4.2
6	(Argentina) Manu Ginóbili	4.0
7	(Puerto Rico) Carlos Arroyo	3.7
8	(Uruguay) Panchi Barrera	3.5
9	(Dominican Republic) Al Horford	3.1
10	(Dominican Republic) Luis Flores	2.7

Steals

Pos.	Name	SPG
1	(Cuba) Juan Pablo Piñeiro	2.5
2	(Panama) Danilo Pinnock	2.4
3	(Dominican Republic) Al Horford	1.9
4	(Argentina) Carlos Delfino	1.8
5	(Uruguay) Panchi Barrera	1.8
6	(Puerto Rico) Renaldo Balkman	1.7
7	(Uruguay) Leandro García Morales	1.7
8	(Argentina) Manu Ginóbili	1.5
8	(Argentina) Pablo Prigioni	1.5
10	(Puerto Rico) Andrés Rodríguez	1.2
10	(Puerto Rico) José Juan Barea	1.2

Blocks

Pos.	Name	BPG
1	(Paraguay) Guillermo Araujo	2.0
2	(Canada) Joel Anthony	1.7
3	(Argentina) Federico Kammerichs	1.4
4	(Dominican Republic) Francisco García	1.3
5	(Dominican Republic) Al Horford	1.0
6	(Puerto Rico) Renaldo Balkman	0.9
7	(Brazil) Tiago Splitter	0.8
8	(Venezuela) Windi Graterol	0.8
9	(Argentina) Luis Scola	0.6
9	(Puerto Rico) Ángel Álamo	0.6

=== Individual Game Highs ===
Department	Name	Total	Opponent
Points	(Panama) Gary Forbes	39	Canada
Rebounds	(Panama) Rubén Garcés	17	Argentina
Assists	(Uruguay) Panchi Barrera	11	Venezuela
Steals	(Uruguay) Leandro García Morales	8	Dominican Republic
Blocks	(Canada) Joel Anthony (Argentina) Juan Pedro Gutiérrez (Puerto Rico) Renaldo Balkman (Argentina) Federico Kammerichs	4	Venezuela; Paraguay; Paraguay; Dominican Republic
Field goal percentage	(Brazil) Guilherme Giovannoni	100% (7/7)	Cuba
3-point field goal percentage	(Puerto Rico) Ricky Sánchez (Brazil) Guilherme Giovannoni	100% (4/4)	Panama; Panama
Free throw percentage	(Paraguay) Enrique Javier Martínez (Venezuela) Óscar Torres (Argentina) Manu Ginóbili (Canada) Jermaine Anderson (Argentina) Luis Scola	100% (8/8)	Panama; Dominican Republic; Puerto Rico; Venezuela; Brazil
Turnovers	(Brazil) Marcelinho Huertas	10	Dominican Republic

=== Team Tournament Highs ===
Offensive PPG

Pos.	Name	PPG
1	Venezuela	94.8
2	Argentina	84.7
3	Puerto Rico	84.0
4	Brazil	83.6
5	Dominican Republic	80.8
6	Canada	74.8
7	Panama	73.1
8	Uruguay	70.1
9	Cuba	68.5
10	Paraguay	64.8

Defensive PPG

Pos.	Name	PPG
1	Argentina	67.9
2	Brazil	73.2
3	Puerto Rico	76.2
4	Dominican Republic	77.5
5	Canada	77.9
6	Uruguay	78.3
7	Paraguay	88.2
8	Venezuela	88.8
9	Panama	91.6
10	Cuba	93.2

Rebounds

Pos.	Name	RPG
1	Dominican Republic	36.2
2	Argentina	34.1
3	Panama	34.1
4	Brazil	33.6
5	Puerto Rico	33.1
6	Venezuela	32.4
7	Canada	32.1
8	Cuba	30.5
9	Uruguay	29.3
10	Paraguay	27.0

Assists

Pos.	Name	APG
1	Argentina	18.1
2	Venezuela	17.6
3	Brazil	17.2
4	Puerto Rico	14.8
5	Dominican Republic	13.4
6	Uruguay	11.6
7	Paraguay	10.8
8	Canada	9.9
9	Cuba	8.0
10	Panama	6.8

Steals

Pos.	Name	SPG
1	Argentina	9.1
2	Uruguay	8.9
3	Cuba	8.0
4	Puerto Rico	7.7
5	Venezuela	6.3
6	Panama	6.0
7	Canada	5.8
8	Dominican Republic	5.3
9	Brazil	5.2
10	Paraguay	4.3

Blocks

Pos.	Name	BPG
1	Dominican Republic	3.8
2	Paraguay	3.5
3	Argentina	3.3
4	Canada	3.3
5	Brazil	2.3
6	Puerto Rico	2.2
7	Venezuela	2.0
8	Panama	1.8
9	Uruguay	1.5
10	Cuba	1.3

=== Team Game highs ===
Department	Name	Total	Opponent
Points	Argentina	111	Venezuela
Rebounds	Venezuela; Puerto Rico	48	Cuba; Paraguay
Assists	Venezuela	32	Panama
Steals	Uruguay	16	Dominican Republic
Blocks	Canada	7	Uruguay
Field goal percentage	Venezuela	80.6% (29/36)	Uruguay
3-point field goal percentage	Argentina	64.3% (18/28)	Venezuela
Free throw percentage	Puerto Rico	100% (15/15)	Panama
Turnovers	Uruguay	27	Argentina

== Final ranking ==
Qualified for the 2012 Summer Olympics.
Qualified for the 2012 FIBA World Olympic Qualifying Tournament.

Rank	Team	Record
1st place, gold medalist(s)	Argentina	9–1
2nd place, silver medalist(s)	Brazil	8–2
3rd place, bronze medalist(s)	Dominican Republic	6–4
4	Puerto Rico	6–4
5	Venezuela	4–4
6	Canada	3–5
7	Uruguay	2–6
8	Panama	2–6
9	Cuba	0–4
10	Paraguay	0–4

1st	2nd	3rd	4th
Argentina Luis Scola; Manu Ginóbili; Pepe Sánchez; Fabricio Oberto; Pablo Prigioni; Juan Pedro Gutiérrez; Carlos Delfino; Paolo Quinteros; Martín Leiva; Andrés Nocioni; Hernán Jasen; Federico Kammerichs	Brazil Marcelinho Machado; Nezinho dos Santos; Rafael Luz; Augusto César Lima; Vítor Benite; Marcelinho Huertas; Alex Garcia; Rafael Hettsheimeir; Guilherme Giovannoni; Caio Torres; Marcus Vinicius; Tiago Splitter	Dominican Republic Edgar Sosa; Charlie Villanueva; Kelvin Peña; Luis Flores; Manuel Fortuna; Francisco García; Al Horford; Elys Guzmán; Orlando Sánchez; Eulis Báez; Ronald Ramon; Jack Michael Martínez	Puerto Rico Javier Mojica; José Juan Barea; John Holland; Carlos Arroyo; Bimbo Carmona; Ángel Álamo; Andrés Rodríguez; Ricky Sánchez; Manuel Narvaez; Renaldo Balkman; Alex Galindo; Daniel Santiago

== All-Tournament Team ==
G – (Brazil) Marcelinho Huertas
G – (Puerto Rico) Carlos Arroyo
F – (Argentina) Manu Ginóbili
F – (Argentina) Luis Scola (Tournament MVP)
C – (Dominican Republic) Al Horford

== See also ==
- 2011 FIBA Americas Championship for Women
