= 2015 FIBA Americas Championship =

Tournament details
- Host country: Mexico
- City: Mexico City
- Dates: 31 August – 12 September
- Teams: 10
- Venue: 1 (in 1 host city)

Final positions
- Champions: Venezuela (1st title)
- Runners-up: Argentina
- Third place: Canada
- Fourth place: Mexico

Tournament statistics
- MVP: (Argentina) Luis Scola
- Top scorer: (Argentina) Luis Scola (21.1 points per game)

Official website
- www.fibaamericas.com

The 2015 FIBA Americas Championship for Men, later known as the FIBA AmeriCup, was the FIBA Americas qualifying tournament for the 2016 Summer Olympics, in Brazil. This FIBA AmeriCup tournament was held in Mexico City, Mexico. The tournament was won for the first time by the Venezuelan national basketball team. Venezuela and runner-up Argentina, qualified directly for the 2016 Olympics. They joined the FIBA Americas member, United States, who qualified for the Olympics by virtue of winning the 2014 FIBA World Cup, and they elected not to participate at this tournament; and FIBA Americas member, Brazil, who finished 9th in the tournament, but qualified for the Olympics as the host nation. Canada, Mexico, and Puerto Rico, the next three highest-finishing teams, qualified for the 2016 FIBA Olympic Qualifying Tournament, but none of them won their respective qualifying tournaments, therefore eliminating their 2016 Olympic hopes.

The tournament had great attendance every day, breaking FIBA Americas records, and had attendances of 20,000 people, at the third place and finals games.

== Qualification ==
- Host country
  - Mexico
- Central American and Caribbean Sub-Zone: (2014 Centrobasket)
  - Puerto Rico
  - Dominican Republic
  - Cuba
  - Panama
- North American Sub-Zone:
  - Canada
- South American Sub-Zone: (2014 South American Championship)
  - Venezuela
  - Argentina
  - Brazil
  - Uruguay

== Host selection ==
On 7 August 2014 at the day of the 2014 Centrobasket final, FIBA Americas announced that Mexico was chosen as the host of the championship, over Brazil and Venezuela. The tournament was to be staged at the Monterrey Arena but on 9 May 2015, the venue was moved to the Palacio de los Deportes in Mexico City, and that the dates were also changed to 6 September to 12 September.

== Venue ==
Mexico City	Location of the host city of the 2015 FIBA Americas Championship.
Palacio de los Deportes	Location of the host city of the 2015 FIBA Americas Championship.
Capacity: 20,000	Location of the host city of the 2015 FIBA Americas Championship.

== Draw ==
The draw was held in Museum of Steel, Fundidora Park, Monterrey, Nuevo Leon on 25 March. This was how the teams were seeded:

Argentina (3); Brazil (9)	Puerto Rico (15); Dominican Republic (20)	Venezuela (29); Uruguay (26)	Cuba (57); Panama (33)	Canada (25); Mexico (19)

== Preliminary round ==
=== Group A ===
Pos	Team	Pld	W	L	PF	PA	PD	Pts	Qualification
1	Mexico (H)	4	4	0	309	255	+54	8	Advance to second round
2	Dominican Republic	4	2	2	304	291	+13	6 (Note: Dominican Republic–Panama 83–66)	Advance to second round
3	Panama	4	2	2	301	308	−7	6	Advance to second round
4	Uruguay	4	1	3	275	303	−28	5 (Note: Uruguay–Brazil 71–57)	Advance to second round
5	Brazil	4	1	3	258	290	−32	5	Eliminated

Source: FIBA Americas
Rules for classification: (1) Tournament points, (2) Head-to-head tournament points, (3) Head-to-head goal average, (4) Overall goal average, (5) Drawing of lots
(H) Hosts
Notes:

All times are local (UTC−05:00).

31 August
14:30

Boxscore

Uruguay	71–57	Brazil
Scoring by quarter: 12–12, 15–12, 19–17, 25–16
Pts: Fitipaldo 12; Rebs: Borsellino 8 Asts: Parodi 5		Pts: Marquinhos 21; Rebs: Marquinhos 9 Asts: Luz 4

Palacio de los Deportes, Mexico City

31 August
20:30

Boxscore

Dominican Republic	66–84	Mexico
Scoring by quarter: 13–24, 18–12, 15–30, 20–18
Pts: Sosa 18; Rebs: Sánchez 8 Asts: Sosa 4		Pts: Méndez 24; Rebs: Ayón 11; Asts: Toscano 7

Palacio de los Deportes, Mexico City

1 September
12:00

Boxscore

Panama	78–71	Uruguay
Scoring by quarter: 15–19, 19–20, 21–12, 23–20
Pts: Hicks 21; Rebs: Lloreda 11; Asts: Gaskins 6		Pts: Fitipaldo 18; Rebs: Calfani 7 Asts: Osimani 7

Palacio de los Deportes, Mexico City

1 September
18:00

Boxscore

Brazil	71–65	Dominican Republic
Scoring by quarter: 16–16, 29–16, 13–13, 13–20
Pts: Marquinhos 17; Rebs: Batista 9 Asts: Benite 3		Pts: Feldeine 20; Rebs: Santana 10; Asts: Sosa 3

Palacio de los Deportes, Mexico City

2 September
12:00

Boxscore

Dominican Republic	83–66	Panama
Scoring by quarter: 26–16, 16–24, 22–21, 19–5
Pts: Feldeine 16; Rebs: Vargas 9 Asts: Sosa 6		Pts: Lloreda 16; Rebs: Lloreda 10; Asts: Gaskins 5

Palacio de los Deportes, Mexico City

2 September
20:30

Boxscore

Mexico	65–58	Brazil
Scoring by quarter: 18–17, 12–15, 18–11, 17–15
Pts: Ayón 27; Rebs: Ayón 13; Asts: J. Gutiérrez 4		Pts: Benite 23; Rebs: Lima 6 Asts: Fischer 4

Palacio de los Deportes, Mexico City

3 September
12:00

Boxscore

Uruguay	70–90	Dominican Republic
Scoring by quarter: 11–21, 12–21, 22–23, 25–25
Pts: Fitipaldo 18; Rebs: Wachsmann 12; Asts: Fitipaldo, Aguiar 3		Pts: Feldeine 17; Rebs: Báez 7 Asts: Feldeine 5

Palacio de los Deportes, Mexico City

3 September
20:30

Boxscore

Panama	68–82	Mexico
Scoring by quarter: 19–18, 9–9, 19–35, 21–20
Pts: Lloreda 16; Rebs: Pomare, Garcés 7 Asts: Muñoz 6		Pts: Stoll 20; Rebs: Ayón 11; Asts: Stoll 7

Palacio de los Deportes, Mexico City

4 September
14:30

Boxscore

Brazil	72–89	Panama
Scoring by quarter: 26–22, 13–17, 13–19, 20-31
Pts: Benite 21; Rebs: Lima 9 Asts: Luz 7		Pts: Gaskins 23; Rebs: Lloreda 9 Asts: Gaskins 6

Palacio de los Deportes, Mexico City

4 September
20:30

Boxscore

Mexico	78–63	Uruguay
Scoring by quarter: 14–16, 24–11, 17–14, 23–22
Pts: Ayón 23; Rebs: Ayón 14; Asts: Ayón 6		Pts: Aguiar 15; Rebs: Calfani 10; Asts: Fitipaldo, Osimani 4

Palacio de los Deportes, Mexico City

=== Group B ===
Pos	Team	Pld	W	L	PF	PA	PD	Pts	Qualification
1	Argentina	4	4	0	358	305	+53	8	Advance to second round
2	Canada	4	3	1	382	307	+75	7	Advance to second round
3	Venezuela	4	2	2	277	274	+3	6	Advance to second round
4	Puerto Rico	4	1	3	332	338	−6	5	Advance to second round
5	Cuba	4	0	4	236	361	−125	4	Eliminated

Source: FIBA Americas
Rules for classification: (1) Tournament points, (2) Head-to-head tournament points, (3) Head-to-head goal average, (4) Overall goal average, (5) Drawing of lots

All times are local (UTC−05:00).

31 August
12:00

Boxscore

Cuba	52–73	Venezuela
Scoring by quarter: 7–18, 14–21, 16–18, 15–16
Pts: Rivero 10; Rebs: Rivero 7 Asts: Granda 3		Pts: Guillént 14; Rebs: Graterol 5 Asts: Guillént 7

Palacio de los Deportes, Mexico City

31 August
18:00

Boxscore

Argentina	91–86	Puerto Rico
Scoring by quarter: 24–30, 17–15, 33–28, 17–13
Pts: Scola 22; Rebs: Scola 14; Asts: Campazzo 5		Pts: Barea 20; Rebs: Chaney 7 Asts: Barea 10

Palacio de los Deportes, Mexico City

1 September
14:30

Boxscore

Canada	87–94	Argentina
Scoring by quarter: 20–17, 22–29, 24–25, 21–23
Pts: Wiggins 13; Rebs: Olynyk 10; Asts: Joseph 7		Pts: Scola 35; Rebs: Scola 13; Asts: Campazzo 6

Palacio de los Deportes, Mexico City

1 September
20:30

Boxscore

Puerto Rico	91–61	Cuba
Scoring by quarter: 24–17, 23–14, 20–17, 24–13
Pts: Barea 19; Rebs: Díaz 7 Asts: Barea 6		Pts: Rivero 20; Rebs: Haití 13; Asts: Haití 4

Palacio de los Deportes, Mexico City

2 September
14:30

Boxscore

Cuba	59–101	Canada
Scoring by quarter: 10–30, 9–19, 22–22, 18–30
Pts: Rivero 20; Rebs: Jústiz 8 Asts: Granda 6		Pts: Stauskas, Wiggins 15; Rebs: Doornekamp 9 Asts: Joseph 6

Palacio de los Deportes, Mexico City

2 September
18:00

Boxscore

Venezuela	74–63	Puerto Rico
Scoring by quarter: 20–22, 23–15, 19–12, 12–14
Pts: Graterol 13; Rebs: Cox 6 Asts: G. Vargas 6		Pts: Barea 20; Rebs: Clemente 5 Asts: Barea 5

Palacio de los Deportes, Mexico City

3 September
14:30

Boxscore

Argentina	96–64	Cuba
Scoring by quarter: 23–22, 12–13, 34–10, 27–19
Pts: three players 11; Rebs: Nocioni 13; Asts: Laprovíttola 7		Pts: Rivero 25; Rebs: Jústiz 13; Asts: Haití 5

Palacio de los Deportes, Mexico City

3 September
18:00

Boxscore

Canada	82–62	Venezuela
Scoring by quarter: 25–15, 22–13, 17–20, 18–14
Pts: Stauskas 16; Rebs: Bennett 10; Asts: Joseph 5		Pts: Lewis 17; Rebs: Colmenares 6 Asts: J. Vargas 3

Palacio de los Deportes, Mexico City

4 September
12:00

Boxscore

Venezuela	68–77	Argentina
Scoring by quarter: 11–16, 17–11, 20–28, 20–22
Pts: G. Vargas 21; Rebs: Graterol 7 Asts: Colmenares 3		Pts: Scola 26; Rebs: Scola 10; Asts: Campazzo 6

Palacio de los Deportes, Mexico City

4 September
18:00

Boxscore

Puerto Rico	92–112	Canada
Scoring by quarter: 23–24, 21–22, 16–35, 32–31
Pts: Barea 20; Rebs: Balkman 11; Asts: Barea 7		Pts: Wiggins 19; Rebs: Bennett, Olynyk 9 Asts: Joseph 5

Palacio de los Deportes, Mexico City

== Second round ==
Pos	Team	Pld	W	L	PF	PA	PD	Pts	Qualification
1	Canada	7	6	1	707	572	+135	13 (Note: Canada 1–1, +14; Argentina 1–1, –5; Mexico 1–1 −9)	Advance to final round
2	Argentina	7	6	1	611	564	+47	13	Advance to final round
3	Mexico (H)	7	6	1	577	530	+47	13	Advance to final round
4	Venezuela	7	3	4	496	502	−6	10 (Note: Venezuela–Puerto Rico 74–63)	Advance to final round
5	Puerto Rico	7	3	4	583	601	−18	10	Qualify to Final Olympic Qualifying Tournament
6	Dominican Republic	7	2	5	586	602	−16	9	Eliminated
7	Panama	7	1	6	468	576	−108	8 (Note: Panama–Uruguay 77–73)	Eliminated
8	Uruguay	7	1	6	519	600	−81	8	Eliminated

Source: FIBA Americas
Rules for classification: (1) Tournament points, (2) Head-to-head tournament points, (3) Head-to-head goal average, (4) Overall goal average, (5) Drawing of lots
(H) Hosts
Notes:

All times are local (UTC−05:00).

6 September
12:00

Boxscore

Dominican Republic	68–72	Venezuela
Scoring by quarter: 13–20, 15–19, 15–18, 25–15
Pts: Sosa 21; Rebs: Sánchez 7 Asts: Sosa 5		Pts: Colmenares 19; Rebs: Ruiz 17; Asts: G. Vargas 6

Palacio de los Deportes, Mexico City

6 September
14:30

Boxscore

Argentina	90–87	Uruguay
Scoring by quarter: 18–19, 19–25, 29–23, 24–20
Pts: Scola 26; Rebs: Scola 13; Asts: Campazzo 8		Pts: Calfani 20; Rebs: Calfani 17; Asts: Osimani 8

Palacio de los Deportes, Mexico City

6 September
18:00

Boxscore

Canada	103–66	Panama
Scoring by quarter: 20–10, 22–13, 35–20, 26–23
Pts: Heslip 23; Rebs: Bennett, Olynyk 9 Asts: Stauskas 5		Pts: King 13; Rebs: Horne 6 Asts: Muñoz 6

Palacio de los Deportes, Mexico City

6 September
20:30

Boxscore

Mexico	92–86	Puerto Rico
Scoring by quarter: 24–21, 23–21, 22–23, 23–21
Pts: Hernández 28; Rebs: Hernández, Ayón 12; Asts: J. Gutiérrez 9		Pts: Vassallo 27; Rebs: Díaz 7 Asts: Barea 10

Palacio de los Deportes, Mexico City

7 September
12:00

Boxscore

Panama	57–84	Argentina
Scoring by quarter: 13–13, 13–21, 10–25, 21–25
Pts: Hicks 15; Rebs: Garcés 11; Asts: Gaskins 2		Pts: Scola 16; Rebs: Nocioni 9 Asts: Campazzo 6

Palacio de los Deportes, Mexico City

7 September
14:30

Boxscore

Puerto Rico	98–92	Dominican Republic
Scoring by quarter: 27–25, 20–9, 22–27, 29–31
Pts: Barea 37; Rebs: Barea 7 Asts: Barea 9		Pts: García 25; Rebs: Mendoza, Sánchez 6 Asts: Sosa, García 4

Palacio de los Deportes, Mexico City

7 September
18:00

Boxscore

Uruguay	82–109	Canada
Scoring by quarter: 22–29, 10–28, 20–29, 30–23
Pts: Borsellino 15; Rebs: Wachsmann 4 Asts: Fitipaldo 5		Pts: Wiggins 18; Rebs: Nicholson 10; Asts: Joseph, Nicholson 6

Palacio de los Deportes, Mexico City

7 September
20:30

Boxscore

Venezuela	70–73	Mexico
Scoring by quarter: 16–12, 21–16, 20–23, 13–22
Pts: Cox 22; Rebs: Colmenares 10; Asts: Cubillán 3		Pts: J. Gutiérrez 20; Rebs: Ayón 11; Asts: J. Gutiérrez 4

Palacio de los Deportes, Mexico City

8 September
12:00

Boxscore

Argentina	92–84	Dominican Republic
Scoring by quarter: 21–22, 24–20, 28–23, 19–19
Pts: Nocioni 25; Rebs: Scola 14; Asts: Scola 6		Pts: Sosa 24; Rebs: three players 7 Asts: García 5

Palacio de los Deportes, Mexico City

8 September
14:30

Boxscore

Venezuela	75–77	Uruguay
Scoring by quarter: 24–20, 17–22, 8–17, 26–18
Pts: J. Vargas 17; Rebs: Ruiz 7 Asts: J. Vargas 10		Pts: Newsome 20; Rebs: Calfani 7 Asts: Fitipaldo 7

Palacio de los Deportes, Mexico City

8 September
18:00

Boxscore

Panama	71–78	Puerto Rico
Scoring by quarter: 26–16, 16–20, 14–15, 15-27
Pts: Gaskins 29; Rebs: Garcés 10; Asts: Lloreda 3		Pts: Barea 15; Rebs: Clemente 7 Asts: Rivera 4

Palacio de los Deportes, Mexico City

8 September
20:30

Boxscore

Mexico	73–94	Canada
Scoring by quarter: 17–26, 13–26, 22–22, 21–20
Pts: Cruz 13; Rebs: Ayón, I. Gutiérrez 7 Asts: Stoll 6		Pts: Wiggins 17; Rebs: Ejim 8 Asts: Joseph 6

Palacio de los Deportes, Mexico City

9 September
12:00

Boxscore

Panama	62–75	Venezuela
Scoring by quarter: 22–21, 13–19, 17–19, 10–16
Pts: Hicks 20; Rebs: Garcés 12; Asts: Gaskins 5		Pts: Cox 21; Rebs: Colmenares 10; Asts: G. Vargas 6

Palacio de los Deportes, Mexico City

9 September
14:30

Boxscore

Dominican Republic	103–120	Canada
Scoring by quarter: 18–36, 28–29, 26–31, 31–24
Pts: Suero 19; Rebs: Suero 6 Asts: Flores 7		Pts: Joseph 17; Rebs: Olynyk 9 Asts: Joseph 7

Palacio de los Deportes, Mexico City

9 September
18:00

Boxscore

Uruguay	69–80	Puerto Rico
Scoring by quarter: 12–23, 11–24, 19–20, 27–13
Pts: Fitipaldo 15; Rebs: Borsellino 6 Asts: Osimani 5		Pts: Barea 19; Rebs: Balkman 9 Asts: Rivera 5

Palacio de los Deportes, Mexico City

9 September
20:30

Boxscore

Mexico	95–83	Argentina
Scoring by quarter: 20–26, 25–16, 14–30, 36–11
Pts: Ayón 38; Rebs: Ayón 14; Asts: Cruz, Stoll 5		Pts: Scola 26; Rebs: Nocioni 8 Asts: Campazzo, Laprovíttola 5

Palacio de los Deportes, Mexico City

== Final round ==
Semi-finals
11 September — Mexico City
Canada	78
Venezuela	79
11 September — Mexico City
Argentina	78
Mexico	70

Final
12 September — Mexico City
Venezuela	76
Argentina	71
Third place
12 September — Mexico City
Canada	87
Mexico	86

=== Semifinals ===
Finalists qualify for the 2016 Summer Olympics, while losing semifinalists qualify to the 2016 FIBA World Olympic Qualifying Tournament for Men.

11 September
18:00

Boxscore

Canada	78–79	Venezuela
Scoring by quarter: 19–20, 18–18, 23–20, 18–21
Pts: Olynyk 34; Rebs: Olynyk 13; Asts: Joseph, Scrubb 4		Pts: Graterol 20; Rebs: Colmenares 6 Asts: Cox 4

Palacio de los Deportes, Mexico City

11 September
20:30

Boxscore

Argentina	78–70	Mexico
Scoring by quarter: 25–26, 10–14, 27–22, 16–8
Pts: Scola 18; Rebs: Nocioni 13; Asts: Campazzo 8		Pts: Gutiérrez 17; Rebs: Ayón 12; Asts: Ayón 5

Palacio de los Deportes, Mexico City

=== Bronze medal game ===
12 September
18:00

Boxscore

Canada	87–86	Mexico
Scoring by quarter: 18–14, 22–27, 20–23, 27–22
Pts: Nicholson 20; Rebs: Olynyk 11; Asts: Joseph 8		Pts: Ramos 19; Rebs: Ayón 19; Asts: Stoll 10

Palacio de los Deportes, Mexico City

=== Final ===
12 September
20:30

Boxscore

Venezuela	76–71	Argentina
Scoring by quarter: 13–20, 17–8, 19–24, 27–19
Pts: Guillént 15; Rebs: J. Vargas, G. Vargas 7 Asts: G. Vargas 4		Pts: Nocioni 21; Rebs: Scola 11; Asts: Campazzo 7

Palacio de los Deportes, Mexico City

== Final ranking ==
Qualified for the 2016 Summer Olympics
Qualified for the 2016 FIBA World Olympic Qualifying Tournament for Men
Qualified for the 2016 Summer Olympics as host nation

Rank	Team	Record	FIBA World Rankings		
Rank	Team	Record	Before	After	Change
1st place, gold medalist(s)	Venezuela	6–4	27	22	5
2nd place, silver medalist(s)	Argentina	8–2	3	4	-1
3rd place, bronze medalist(s)	Canada	8–2	25	26	-1
4	Mexico	7–3	19	19	0
5	Puerto Rico	4–4	15	16	-1
6	Dominican Republic	2–6	20	18	2
7	Panama	2–6	33	33	0
8	Uruguay	2–6	26	27	-1
9	Brazil	1–3	9	9	0
10	Cuba	0–4	T-58	45	13

== Awards ==
2015 FIBA Americas Championship winners

Venezuela
First title

Most Valuable Player
(Argentina) Luis Scola

=== All-Tournament Team ===
- (Venezuela) Heissler Guillént
- (Canada) Andrew Wiggins
- (Argentina) Andrés Nocioni
- (Argentina) Luis Scola (MVP)
- (Mexico) Gustavo Ayón
