= Luis Scola =

Argentine basketball player (born 1980)

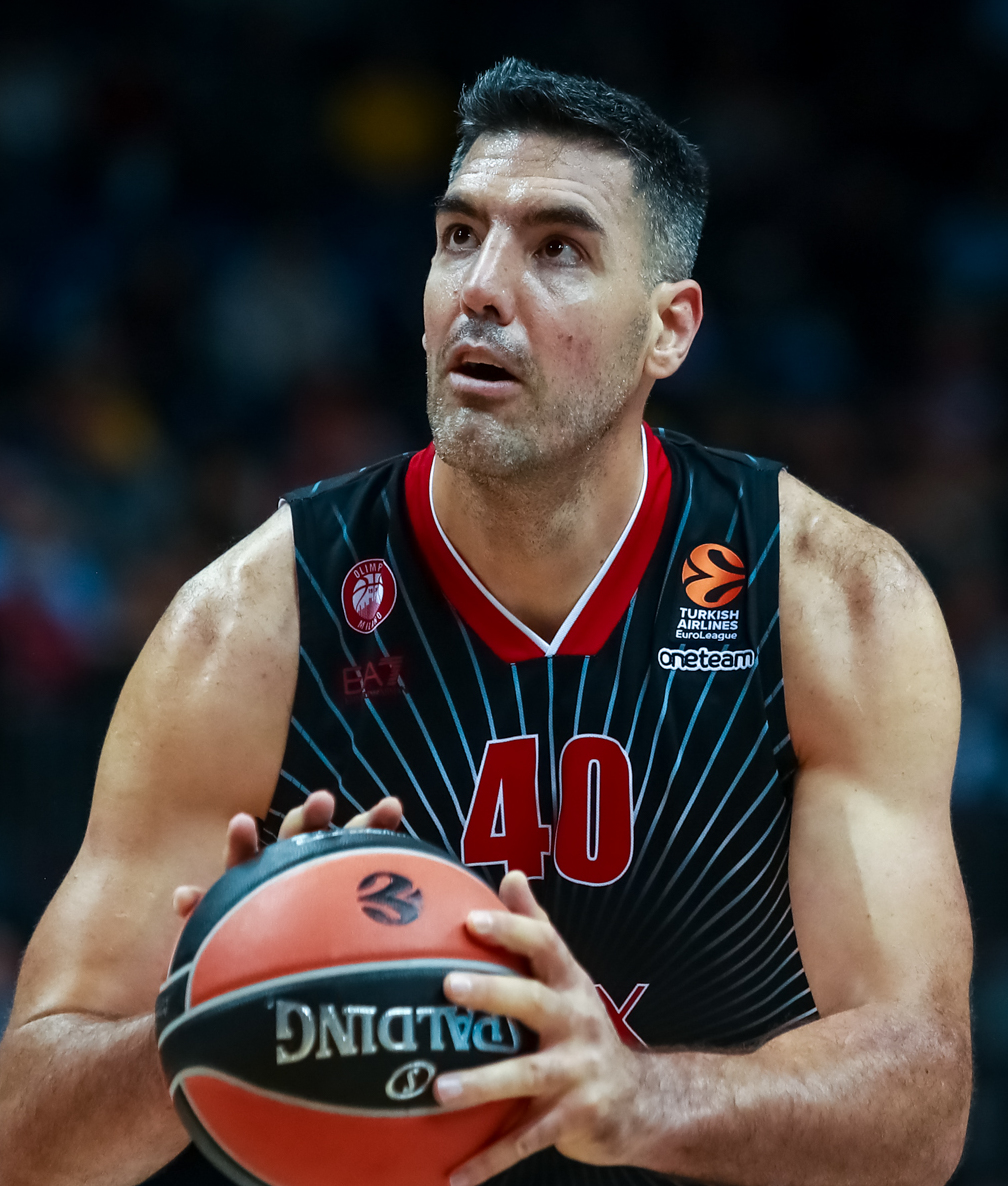
- Scola with the Olimpia Milano in 2019

Pallacanestro Varese
- Title: Chief executive officer
- League: LBA

Personal information
- Born: 30 April 1980 (age 46) Buenos Aires, Argentina
- Listed height: 6 ft 9 in (2.06 m)
- Listed weight: 240 lb (109 kg)

Career information
- NBA draft: 2002: 2nd round, 56th overall pick
- Drafted by: San Antonio Spurs
- Playing career: 1995–2021
- Position: Power forward
- Number: 4, 14, 40

Career history
- 1995–1998: Ferro Carril Oeste
- 1998–2007: Tau Ceramica
- 1998–2000: →Gijón
- 2007–2012: Houston Rockets
- 2012–2013: Phoenix Suns
- 2013–2015: Indiana Pacers
- 2015–2016: Toronto Raptors
- 2016–2017: Brooklyn Nets
- 2017–2018: Shanxi Brave Dragons
- 2018–2019: Shanghai Sharks
- 2019–2020: Olimpia Milano
- 2020–2021: Varese

Career highlights
- NBA All-Rookie First Team (2008); 2× All-EuroLeague First Team (2006, 2007); All-EuroLeague Second Team (2005); Liga ACB champion (2002); 3× Spanish Cup winner (2002, 2004, 2006); 3× Spanish Supercup winner (2005–2007); 2× Liga ACB MVP (2005, 2007); Liga ACB Rookie of the Year (2000); 4× All-Liga ACB Team (2004–2007); Spanish Supercup MVP (2005); No. 4 retired by Baskonia; CBA All-Star (2018); 4× FIBA AmeriCup MVP (2007, 2009, 2011, 2015); FIBA Americas Under-20 Championship MVP (2000)

Career statistics
- Points: 8,882 (12.0 ppg)
- Rebounds: 4,941 (6.7 rpg)
- Assists: 1,194 (1.6 apg)
- Stats at NBA.com
- Stats at Basketball Reference
Medals
Event	1st	2nd	3rd
Olympic Games	1	0	1
FIBA World Cup	0	2	0
FIBA Diamond Ball	1	0	1
FIBA AmeriCup	2	4	3
Pan American Games	1	0	0
Total	5	6	5
Men's basketball
Representing Argentina
Olympic Games
Gold medal – first place	2004 Athens	
Bronze medal – third place	2008 Beijing	
World Cup
Silver medal – second place	2002 Indianapolis	
Silver medal – second place	2019 China	
FIBA Diamond Ball
Bronze medal – third place	2004 Belgrade	
Gold medal – first place	2008 Nanjing	
FIBA AmeriCup
Gold medal – first place	2001 Neuquén	
Gold medal – first place	2011 Mar del Plata	
Silver medal – second place	2003 San Juan	
Silver medal – second place	2007 Las Vegas	
Silver medal – second place	2015 Mexico City	
Silver medal – second place	2017 Argentina	
Bronze medal – third place	1999 San Juan	
Bronze medal – third place	2009 San Juan	
Bronze medal – third place	2013 Caracas	
Pan American Games
Gold medal – first place	2019 Lima	

Luis Alberto Scola Balvoa (born 30 April 1980) is an Argentine former basketball player and the chief executive officer for the Italian Lega Basket Serie A (LBA) team Pallacanestro Varese. A three-time All-EuroLeague selection with Tau Ceramica, he signed with the Houston Rockets in 2007 and was voted to the NBA All-Rookie First Team. He also played for the Phoenix Suns, Indiana Pacers, Toronto Raptors, and Brooklyn Nets.

Scola has been a regular member of the Argentina national basketball team since 1999, winning an Olympic gold medal in 2004 and a bronze medal in 2008.

In 2010, Scola won the Konex Award Merit Diploma as one of the five best basketball players from the last decade in Argentina. He was honored as the national flag bearer at the 2016 Summer Olympics.

== Professional career ==
=== Ferro Carril Oeste (1995–1998) ===
Scola started his career with the Buenos Aires youth teams of Ferro Carril Oeste. He made his professional debut with the same club's pro team in the Argentine league during the 1995–96 season at age 15.

=== Gijón (1998–2000) ===
After the 1997–98 basketball season in the Argentine League, Scola moved to Spain and signed with Saski Baskonia. He was loaned to Gijón Baloncesto, where he helped the then Spanish League Second Division club achieve promotion to the Spanish League First Division. He then was loaned back to Gijón through the 1999–2000 season before arriving at Baskonia, where he played for seven seasons.

=== Baskonia (2000–2007) ===
With Saski Baskonia, Scola reached the EuroLeague Finals in the 2000–01 season, and three consecutive EuroLeague Final Fours, between 2005 and 2007. His outstanding performances earned him an All-EuroLeague Second Team selection in 2005, as well as two All-EuroLeague First Team selections in 2006 and 2007.

Although Scola did not win the EuroLeague championship with Baskonia, he did win with them every major Spanish League title, winning a Spanish ACB League championship in 2002, three Spanish King's Cups in 2002, 2004, 2006, and three Spanish Supercups in 2005, 2006, 2007.

=== Houston Rockets (2007–2012) ===
In the summer of 2005, the San Antonio Spurs of the NBA (who drafted Scola in 2002) attempted to negotiate with Baskonia to buy out his contract. The teams settled on a number of over $3 million for the buyout of the contract. This made it difficult for Scola to join fellow Argentina national team member Manu Ginóbili in San Antonio because of the NBA's rule, which limits teams to paying no more than $500,000 of a player's buyout. Scola would have been responsible for paying Baskonia the remaining $2.5 million amount of the buyout. When the deal to buy out Scola's contract fell through, the Spurs instead signed an Argentine national team teammate and friend of Scola's, Fabricio Oberto.

On July 12, 2007, the Spurs traded the rights to Scola, along with center-forward Jackie Butler, to the Houston Rockets, in return for Vassilis Spanoulis, a future second-round draft pick, and cash considerations. He signed with the Rockets soon after and his US$3.2 million buyout was completed a few days later. Scola signed a three-year contract with the Rockets at a salary of $9.5 million. Scola placed third in the NBA 2007–08 Rookie of the Year Award voting and he was also named to the NBA All-Rookie First Team. On March 13, 2010, he scored a career-high 44 points against the New Jersey Nets.

On the afternoon of December 8, 2011, the day before the 2011 NBA lockout ended, and players could move between teams, the Rockets, the Los Angeles Lakers and the New Orleans Hornets agreed to a trade that would have sent Scola, along with Goran Dragić, Kevin Martin, and Lamar Odom to the Hornets. In exchange, the Rockets would have received Pau Gasol, and the Lakers would have received star point guard Chris Paul. After other team owners voiced their opposition that night, league commissioner David Stern nullified the trade.

On July 13, 2012, he was waived by the Rockets using the league's amnesty clause to provide salary cap relief. It was widely noted, however, that Scola was not cut due to a lack of performance; rather, the deal was an attempt to clear cap space for the Rockets to trade for former Orlando Magic All-Star center Dwight Howard. Howard was instead traded to the Los Angeles Lakers, but the Rockets used their cap space to gain former Oklahoma City Thunder Sixth Man of the Year shooting guard and Olympic gold medalist James Harden.

=== Phoenix Suns (2012–2013) ===
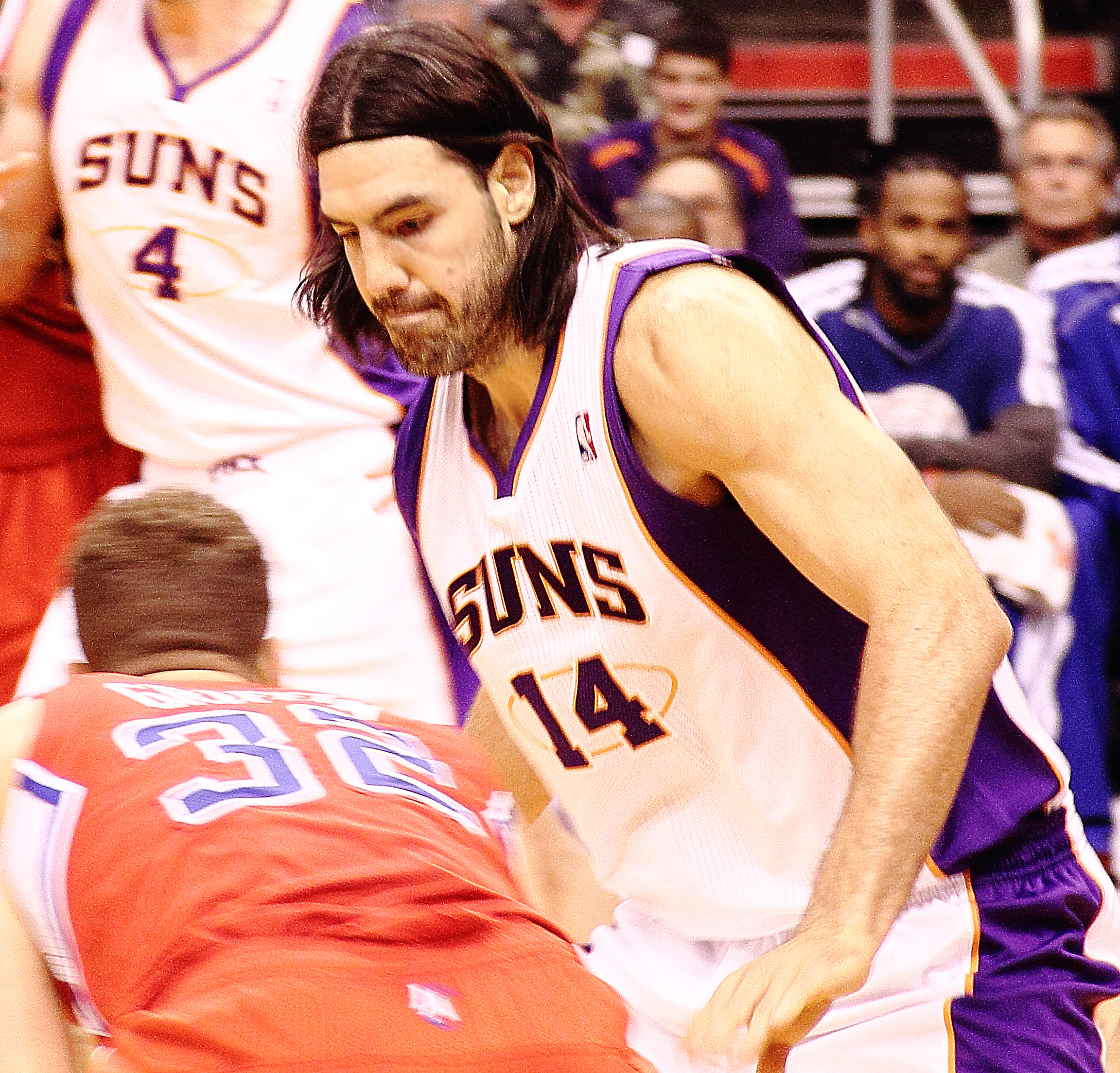
Scola with the Suns in December 2012 defending Blake Griffin

On July 15, 2012, Scola was claimed off amnesty waivers by the Phoenix Suns. Reportedly, the Dallas Mavericks and the Cleveland Cavaliers were also interested in acquiring him during the amnesty process. On November 21, 2012, he was relegated to playing off the bench for the first time in his NBA career since the start of his rookie season. He regained his starting spot less than a month later, and on December 29, he scored a season-high 33 points against the Minnesota Timberwolves. While Scola did become a leader for the Suns, he finished the season with declining averages, as his 12.8 points per game were his lowest since the 2008–09 season.

=== Indiana Pacers (2013–2015) ===
On July 27, 2013, the Suns traded Scola to the Indiana Pacers in exchange for Gerald Green, Miles Plumlee, and a 2014 first-round draft pick (Bogdan Bogdanović). In his two seasons for the Pacers, he played a back-up power forward role to David West as he started just 18 games over his two-year stint, while helping the team reach the Eastern Conference Finals in 2014.

=== Toronto Raptors (2015–2016) ===
On July 15, 2015, Scola signed with the Toronto Raptors in what would turn out to be the best season in the DeMar DeRozan/Kyle Lowry era. Scola strengthened a front court that had centre Jonas Valanciunas, centre Bismack Biyombo, power forward Patrick Patterson, and small forward DeMarre Carroll. Scola made his debut for the Raptors in their season opener on October 28, recording eight rebounds while taking no field goal attempts in a 106–99 win over the Indiana Pacers.

During the season, Scola shot an impressive 40.4% (65 out of 161) from beyond the three-point line, which was his career-high 3-point shooting percentage. Not only did Scola make a high percentage of his shots from beyond the 3-point arc, the number of 3-point shot attempts he took was a high-volume amount for an NBA big. In the first eight seasons of his career combined, Scola shot 60 three points attempts, versus the 161 attempts he took during his season with the Raptors.

The Raptors went on to a 56–26 season, the first time the franchise had 50 wins or better in a regular season, eclipsing the franchise previous-best record of 49-33 earned the season before. Scola helped the Raptors defeat the Paul George-led Indiana Pacers in the first round, marking the Toronto Raptors' first victory in a playoff Game 7 in franchise history. Scola and the Raptors defeated the Dwyane Wade-led Miami Heat in seven games in the second round, marking the second playoff Game 7 win in the team's history. With the victory, the Raptors advanced to the Eastern Conference Finals in 2016 for the first time in their franchise history.

=== Brooklyn Nets (2016–2017) ===
On July 13, 2016, Scola signed with the Brooklyn Nets. He made his debut for the Nets in their season opener on October 26, scoring eight points in a 122–117 loss to the Boston Celtics.

Scola's final NBA game was played on February 13, 2017, in a 103 - 112 loss to the Memphis Grizzlies, where he recorded four assists and four rebounds but no points in 15 minutes of playing time. On February 27, 2017, he was waived by the Nets.

=== Shanxi Brave Dragons (2017–2018) ===
On July 9, 2017, Scola signed with the Shanxi Brave Dragons of the Chinese Basketball Association.

=== Shanghai Sharks (2018–2019) ===
On August 10, 2018, Scola signed with the Shanghai Sharks of the Chinese Basketball Association.

=== Olimpia Milano (2019–2020) ===
On September 29, 2019, Olimpia Milano head coach, Ettore Messina, during the press conference of the 2nd round match of the 2019–20 LBA season lost against Germani Basket Brescia, announced that Scola had signed with the team for the rest of season. On June 11, 2020, Scola left Olimpia Milano.

=== Varese (2020–2021) ===
On July 1, 2020, Scola announced that he would play at least one year more before retirement and signed with Pallacanestro Varese of the LBA for the 2020–21 season with an option to extend for the following year.

=== Retirement ===
On November 3, 2023, Scola's jersey number 4 was retired by Saski Baskonia.

== Post-playing career ==
On September 20, 2021, Pallacanestro Varese announced that Scola would re-join them as chief executive officer.

== National team career ==
=== Junior national team ===
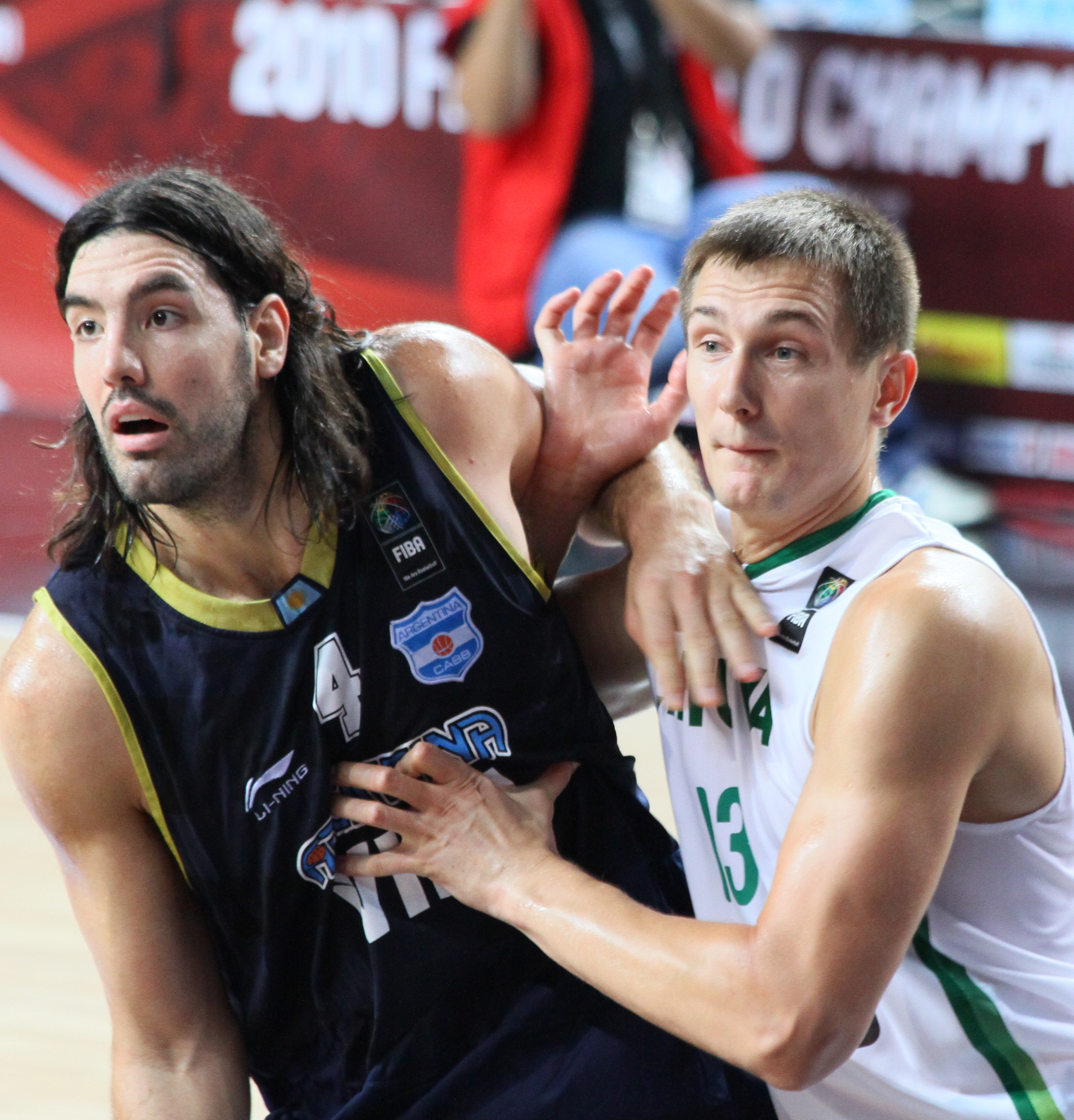
Scola (left) with the Argentine national team, 2010

With Argentina's junior national teams, Scola won the gold medal at the 1995 South American Cadet Championship, the gold medal at the 1996 South American Junior Championship, the gold medal at the 2000 FIBA Americas Under-20 Championship, and the bronze medal at the 2001 FIBA Under-21 World Cup.

=== Senior national team ===
As a member of the senior Argentina national team, Scola has won multiple medals: the silver medal at the 1999 South American Championship, the bronze medal at the 1999 FIBA Americas Championship, the gold medal at the 2001 FIBA Americas Championship, the silver medal at the 2002 FIBA World Championship, the silver medal at the 2003 FIBA Americas Championship, the gold medal at the 2004 Summer Olympics, the silver medal at the 2007 FIBA Americas Championship, the bronze medal at the 2008 Summer Olympics, the bronze medal at the 2009 FIBA Americas Championship, the gold medal at the 2011 FIBA Americas Championship and the bronze medal at the 2013 FIBA Americas Championship among other titles. At the 2015 FIBA Americas Championship tournament, Scola became the all-time leading scorer in FIBA AmeriCup history and won his 4th tournament MVP.

Scola broke two records of the Argentina national team at the FIBA World Cup, during the 2010 edition: top overall scorer for Argentina at a World Cup (beating Ernesto Gehrmann's 331 points) and most points scored for Argentina in one game at a World Cup (scoring 37 against Brazil in the round of 16, therefore beating Alberto Desimone's 35 points scored against Mexico in 1963).

In 2019, at 39 years old, he was part of the team that won the gold medal at the Pan American Games.

At the 2019 FIBA World Cup, he scored 135 points and 57 rebounds in the seven matches en route to the final. Scola scored 23 points against Nigeria in a preliminary round of the 2019 World Cup game at Wuhan, giving him a total of 611 points in his World Cup career. With this, Scola passed Andrew Gaze's total of 594 and is now second only to Brazilian scoring great Oscar Schmidt's 906 points in the tournament.

Scola scored a team-high 23 points in a loss to Slovenia in the preliminary round of the 2020 Olympics in Tokyo.

Play was paused during Scola's final game at the 2020 Summer Olympics when his Argentinian team was playing Australia. With less than a minute left in the game, Scola was checked out, and players from both teams, coaches, and those in the stadium gave him a standing ovation out of respect. The referees allowed this pause in the game as they understood the importance of the occasion.

== Titles and medals ==
=== Club level ===
- Spanish League Champion: (2002)
- 3× Spanish King's Cup Winner: (2002, 2004, 2006)
- 3× Spanish Supercup Winner: (2005, 2006, 2007)

=== Argentina national team ===
- 1995 South American Cadet Championship: Gold
- 1996 South American Junior Championship: Gold
- 1999 South American Championship: Silver
- 1999 FIBA Americas Championship: Bronze
- 2000 FIBA Americas Under-20 Championship: Gold
- 2001 FIBA Under-21 World Cup: Bronze
- 2001 FIBA Americas Championship: Gold
- 2002 FIBA World Championship: Silver
- 2003 FIBA Americas Championship: Silver
- 2004 Summer Olympics: Gold
- 2007 FIBA Americas Championship: Silver
- 2008 FIBA Diamond Ball: Gold
- 2008 Summer Olympics: Bronze
- 2009 FIBA Americas Championship: Bronze
- 2011 FIBA Americas Championship: Gold
- 2013 FIBA Americas Championship: Bronze
- 2015 FIBA Americas Championship: Silver
- 2017 FIBA AmeriCup: Silver
- 2019 Pan American Games: Gold
- 2019 FIBA World Championship: Silver

== Awards ==
=== Club level ===
- Spanish League: Rookie of the Year (2000)
- Spanish Supercup: MVP (2005)
- All-EuroLeague Second Team: (2005)
- 2× Spanish League MVP: (2005, 2007)
- 4× All-Spanish League Team: (2004, 2005, 2006, 2007)
- 2× All-EuroLeague First Team: (2006, 2007)
- NBA All-Rookie First Team: (2008)
- 2016 NBA Atlantic Division Sportsmanship Award

=== Argentina junior national team ===
- 2000 FIBA Americas Under-20 Championship: MVP
- 2001 FIBA Under-21 World Cup: All-Tournament Team

=== Argentina senior national team ===
- 2007 FIBA Americas Championship: MVP
- 2009 FIBA Americas Championship: MVP & Top Scorer
- 2010 FIBA World Championship: All-Tournament Team & Top Scorer
- 2011 FIBA Americas Championship: All-Tournament Team & MVP & Top Scorer
- 2013 FIBA Americas Championship: All-Tournament Team & Top Scorer
- 2015 FIBA Americas Championship: All-Tournament Team & MVP & Top Scorer
- 2019 FIBA World Championship: All-Tournament Team

== Career statistics ==
Legend
GP	Games played	GS	Games started	MPG	Minutes per game
FG%	Field-goal percentage	3P%	3-point field-goal percentage	FT%	Free-throw percentage
RPG	Rebounds per game	APG	Assists per game	SPG	Steals per game
BPG	Blocks per game	PPG	Points per game	PIR	Performance index rating
**Bold**	Career high

=== NBA ===
*	Led the league

==== Regular season ====
Year	Team	GP	GS	MPG	FG%	3P%	FT%	RPG	APG	SPG	BPG	PPG
2007–08	Houston	**82***	39	24.7	.515	.000	.668	6.4	1.3	.7	.2	10.3
2008–09	Houston	**82***	**82***	30.3	**.531**	.000	.760	**8.8**	1.5	**.8**	.1	12.7
2009–10	Houston	**82***	**82***	**32.6**	.514	.200	.779	8.6	2.1	**.8**	.3	16.2
2010–11	Houston	74	74	**32.6**	.504	.000	.738	8.2	**2.5**	.6	**.6**	**18.3**
2011–12	Houston	66*	66*	31.3	.491	.000	.773	6.5	2.1	.5	.4	15.5
2012–13	Phoenix	**82***	67	26.6	.473	.188	**.787**	6.6	2.2	**.8**	.4	12.8
2013–14	Indiana	**82**	2	17.1	.470	.143	.728	4.8	1.0	.3	.2	7.6
2014–15	Indiana	81	16	20.5	.467	.250	.699	6.5	1.3	.6	.2	9.4
2015–16	Toronto	76	76	21.5	.450	**.404**	.726	4.7	.9	.6	.4	8.7
2016–17	Brooklyn	36	1	12.8	.470	.340	.676	3.9	1.0	.4	.1	5.1
Career		743	505	25.6	.493	.339	.740	6.7	1.6	.6	.3	12.0

==== Playoffs ====
Year	Team	GP	GS	MPG	FG%	3P%	FT%	RPG	APG	SPG	BPG	PPG
2008	Houston	6	6	**36.7**	.448	.000	.686	**9.3**	1.3	**.7**	**.2**	14.0
2009	Houston	13	**13**	32.6	**.494**	.000	.673	8.4	**1.8**	.5	**.2**	**14.4**
2014	Indiana	**17**	0	13.9	.465	**.333**	.591	2.5	.5	.4	**.2**	6.1
2016	Toronto	11	9	12.7	.258	.190	**.727**	1.6	.6	.3	.0	2.5
Career		48	28	21.4	.454	.200	.667	4.7	1.0	.4	.1	8.5

=== EuroLeague ===
*	Led the league

Year	Team	GP	GS	MPG	FG%	3P%	FT%	RPG	APG	SPG	BPG	PPG	PIR
2000–01	Baskonia	22	5	18.3	.547	.000	.538	4.4	.7	1.0	.1	8.7	7.0
2001–02	Baskonia	20	3	23.7	**.689**	**.333**	.670	4.6	1.1	1.3	.3	**15.9**	16.8
2002–03	Baskonia	16	9	24.7	.546	—	.677	5.0	1.3	.9	.3	15.1	13.0
2003–04	Baskonia	14	6	**28.8**	.604	—	**.765**	6.1	**2.4**	1.4	.4	15.2	16.8
2004–05	Baskonia	24	21	24.7	.564	.000	.676	6.5	1.9	1.3	.7	15.1	16.9
2005–06	Baskonia	**25**	**24**	28.6	.536	.000	.679	**6.7**	2.2	**1.6**	**.8**	14.8	**18.8**
2006–07	Baskonia	23	18	26.5	.573	.000	.708	5.9	2.2	.9	.3	15.5	17.9
2019–20	Milano	28*	24	19.2	.454	.353	.655	4.4	1.1	.5	.1	9.2	8.5
Career		172	110	24.5	.560	.316	.670	5.4	1.6	1.1	.4	13.4	14.3

== Personal life ==
Scola and his wife, fellow Argentine Pamela, have four children together. He also holds a Spanish passport.

On July 18, 2017, Scola was named as an ambassador for the 2018 Summer Youth Olympics in Buenos Aires.

== See also ==
- List of athletes with the most appearances at Olympic Games
- List of Olympic medalists in basketball

Olympic Games
Preceded by Cristian Simari Birkner	Flagbearer for Argentina; Rio de Janeiro 2016	Succeeded by Sebastiano Gastaldi
