= Franco Miller Jr. =

Bahamian basketball player

No. 12 – Ningbo Rockets
- Position: Point guard / shooting guard
- League: CBA

Personal information
- Born: 9 February 1999 (age 27) Freeport, Bahamas
- Listed height: 6 ft 3 in (1.91 m)
- Listed weight: 200 lb (91 kg)

Career information
- High school: Crestwood Preparatory College (Toronto, Ontario)
- College: Ole Miss (2019–2020); Florida Gulf Coast (2020–2024)
- NBA draft: 2024: undrafted
- Playing career: 2024–present

Career history
- 2024–2025: Fibwi Palma
- 2025–2026: Santa Cruz Warriors
- 2026–present: Ningbo Rockets

Career highlights
- FIBA AmeriCup Top Scorer (2025)

Franco Veangelo Miller Jr. (born 9 February 1999) is a Bahamian professional basketball player for the Ningbo Rockets of the Chinese Basketball Association (CBA). He also represents the Bahamas national team in international competitions.

== Early life and college career ==
Miller was born in Freeport, Bahamas, and later moved to Canada where he attended Crestwood Preparatory College in Toronto. There, he became one of the program's top scorers and earned attention from U.S. college recruiters.

In 2018, Miller committed to play for Ole Miss in the Southeastern Conference. He redshirted his first season due to injury and appeared in 19 games during the 2019–20 campaign.

Seeking more playing time, he transferred to Florida Gulf Coast University (FGCU) where he played four seasons. During his tenure with the Eagles, Miller became a regular rotation player and averaged 7 points, 3 rebounds, and 2 assists in his senior year.

== Professional career ==
In August 2024, Miller signed with Spanish club Fibwi Palma in the LEB Plata. He joined the team after participating in international play with the Bahamas, being described as a versatile combo guard able to contribute at both backcourt positions.

== International career ==
Miller has been a consistent member of the Bahamas men's national basketball team. He competed in the 2024 Olympic Pre-Qualifying Tournament, where the Bahamas recorded a historic upset victory against Argentina to advance.

In the 2025 FIBA AmeriCup qualification, Miller averaged 15 points, 3.5 rebounds, and 4.5 assists across two games for the Bahamas.
