= FIBA AmeriCup Most Valuable Player =

Basketball award

The FIBA AmeriCup Most Valuable Player is a FIBA award that is given every four years (previously every two years), to the Most Valuable Player of the FIBA AmeriCup tournament.

== Winners ==
†	Inducted into the FIBA Hall of Fame
*	Inducted into the FIBA Hall of Fame and the Naismith Memorial Basketball Hall of Fame
Player (X)	Denotes the number of times the player had been selected the MVP at that time

Year	Player	Position	Team	Ref.
1999	Steve Nash	PG	Canada	
2001	Manu Ginóbili	SG	Argentina	
2003	Steve Nash (2×)	PG	Canada	
2005	Marcelinho Machado	SF	Brazil	
2007	Luis Scola	PF/C	Argentina	
2009	Luis Scola (2×)	PF/C	Argentina	
2011	Luis Scola (3×)	PF/C	Argentina	
2013	Gustavo Ayón	C	Mexico	
2015	Luis Scola (4×)	PF/C	Argentina	
2017	Jameel Warney	PF	United States	
2022	Gabriel Deck	F	Argentina	
2025	Yago dos Santos	PG	Brazil	
