= José Gregorio Vargas =

Venezuelan basketball player

No. 10 – Guaros de Lara
- Position: Shooting guard / small forward
- League: SLB

Personal information
- Born: January 23, 1982 (age 44) Caracas, Venezuela
- Listed height: 6 ft 4.75 in (1.95 m)
- Listed weight: 220 lb (100 kg)

Career information
- Playing career: 2001–present

Career history
- 2001: Huracanes
- 2003: Tanqueros del Zulia
- 2004: Guaros de Lara
- 2004: Tanqueros del Zulia
- 2005: Trotamundos de Carabobo
- 2005: Tanqueros del Zulia
- 2005: Buchones de Cabimas
- 2006: Trotamundos de Carabobo
- 2006: Buchones de Cabimas
- 2006: Graneros de Portuguesa
- 2007: Trotamundos de Carabobo
- 2007: Graneros de Portuguesa
- 2007: Guaros de Lara
- 2008: Trotamundos de Carabobo
- 2008–2009: Fuerza Regia de Monterrey
- 2009: Trotamundos de Carabobo
- 2009: Graneros de Portuguesa
- 2010: Trotamundos de Carabobo
- 2010: Graneros de Portuguesa
- 2010: Algodoneros de la Comarca
- 2010: Ola Verde de Poza Rica
- 2011: Trotamundos de Carabobo
- 2011–2012: Soles de Mexicali
- 2012: Marinos de Anzoátegui
- 2012: Graneros de Portuguesa
- 2012: Aduaneros de Carabobo
- 2012: Centauros de Apure
- 2012–2013: Soles de Mexicali
- 2013: Marinos de Anzoátegui
- 2013: Estrellas Orientales
- 2013: Aduaneros de Carabobo
- 2014: Marinos de Anzoátegui
- 2014: Aduaneros de Carabobo
- 2014: Protectores de Miranda BBC
- 2015: Marinos de Anzoátegui
- 2015–2016: Guaros de Lara
- 2016: Marinos de Anzoátegui
- 2016–2017: Club La Unión
- 2017–2020: Guaros de Lara
- 2020–2021: Gigantes de Guayana
- 2021–2022: Spartans Distrito Capital
- 2022–present: Guaros de Lara
Medals
Men's basketball
Representing Venezuela
FIBA South American Championship
Gold medal – first place	2014 Venezuela
Gold medal – first place	2016 Venezuela
Silver medal – second place	2012 Argentina
FIBA AmeriCup
Gold medal – first place	2015 Mexico

José Gregorio Vargas (born January 23, 1982) is a Venezuelan professional basketball player. He is a shooting guard-small forward.

== Professional career ==
Vargas has played in several Venezuelan and Mexican teams during his pro career. In 2001, he was selected as rookie of the year in the Venezuelan League. For the 2016–17 season, he signed with La Unión de Formosa, of the top-tier level Argentine League.

== National team career ==
Vargas is a member of the senior men's Venezuelan national basketball team. As a member of the team at the 2015 FIBA Americas Championship, he helped Venezuela to defeat Uruguay and Canada to win the gold medal. That was Venezuela's first FIBA Americas Championship, and allowed them to qualify for the 2016 Summer Olympics in Rio, where Vargas also played.

== Personal ==
Vargas' younger brother, Gregory, is also a professional basketball player. The two brothers have played together on the senior men's Venezuelan national basketball team.
