= 1999 Tournament of the Americas =

Tournament details
- Host country: Puerto Rico
- City: San Juan
- Dates: July 14–25
- Teams: 10
- Venue: 1 (in 1 host city)

Final positions
- Champions: United States (4th title)
- Runners-up: Canada
- Third place: Argentina
- Fourth place: Puerto Rico

Tournament statistics
- MVP: (Canada) Steve Nash
- Top scorer: (Puerto Rico) Jose Ortiz

The 1999 Tournament of the Americas, later known as the FIBA Americas Championship and the FIBA AmeriCup (also known as Las Americas Tournament for Men, the FIBA Americas Olympic Qualifying Tournament, or Panamerican Olympic Qualifying Tournament for Men), was a basketball championship hosted by Puerto Rico, from July 14 to July 25, 1999. The games were played in San Juan, at the Roberto Clemente Coliseum. This FIBA AmeriCup was to earn the two berths allocated to the Americas for the 2000 Olympics, in Sydney, Australia. The United States won the tournament, featuring the Dream Team No4. It was the USA's fourth AmeriCup championship.
The USA won its 10 games in this tournament by an average of 31.6 points.

== Qualification ==
Eight teams qualified during the qualification tournaments held in their respective zones in 1999; two teams (USA and Canada) qualified automatically since they are the only members of the North America zone.

- North America: Canada, United States
- Caribbean and Central America:Cuba, Dominican Republic, Panama, Puerto Rico
- South America: Argentina, Brazil, Uruguay, Venezuela

The draw split the tournament into two groups:

Group A

Argentina
Canada
Cuba
United States
Uruguay

Group B

Brazil
Dominican Republic
Panama
Puerto Rico
Venezuela

== Format ==
- The top four teams from each group advance to the quarterfinals.
- Results and standings among teams within the same group are carried over.
- The top four teams at the quarterfinals advance to the semifinals (1 vs. 4, 2 vs. 3).
- The winners in the knockout semifinals advance to the Final and were granted berths in the 2000 Summer Olympics tournament in Sydney. The losers figure in a third-place playoff.

== Preliminary round ==
Qualified for the quarterfinals

=== Group A ===
Team	Pld	W	L	PF	PA	PD	Pts
United States	4	4	0	403	256	+147	8
Canada	4	3	1	292	291	+1	7
Argentina	4	2	2	320	337	−17	6
Uruguay	4	1	3	302	379	−77	5
Cuba	4	0	4	277	331	−54	4

July 14

Cuba	84–87 (OT)	Uruguay

Roberto Clemente Coliseum, San Juan

July 14

Argentina	70–77	Canada

Roberto Clemente Coliseum, San Juan

July 15

Canada	75–65	Cuba

Roberto Clemente Coliseum, San Juan

July 15

Uruguay	72–118	United States

Roberto Clemente Coliseum, San Juan

July 16

United States	94–60	Canada

Roberto Clemente Coliseum, San Juan

July 16

Cuba	76–81	Argentina

Roberto Clemente Coliseum, San Juan

July 17

Canada	80–62	Uruguay

Roberto Clemente Coliseum, San Juan

July 17

Argentina	72–103	United States

Roberto Clemente Coliseum, San Juan

July 18

United States	88–52	Cuba

Roberto Clemente Coliseum, San Juan

July 18

Uruguay	81–97	Argentina

Roberto Clemente Coliseum, San Juan

=== Group B ===
Team	Pld	W	L	PF	PA	PD	Pts
Puerto Rico	4	4	0	365	310	+55	8
Venezuela	4	3	1	293	287	+6	7
Brazil	4	2	2	316	324	−8	6
Dominican Republic	4	1	3	302	316	−14	5
Panama	4	0	4	289	328	−39	4

July 14

Puerto Rico	81–56	Venezuela

Roberto Clemente Coliseum, San Juan

July 14

Brazil	70–64	Dominican Republic

Roberto Clemente Coliseum, San Juan

July 15

Venezuela	91–68	Brazil

Roberto Clemente Coliseum, San Juan

July 15

Dominican Republic	77–73	Panama

Roberto Clemente Coliseum, San Juan

July 16

Panama	72–76	Venezuela

Roberto Clemente Coliseum, San Juan

July 16

Brazil	88–96	Puerto Rico

Roberto Clemente Coliseum, San Juan

July 17

Puerto Rico	85–71	Panama

Roberto Clemente Coliseum, San Juan

July 17

Venezuela	70–66	Dominican Republic

Roberto Clemente Coliseum, San Juan

July 18

Panama	73–90	Brazil

Roberto Clemente Coliseum, San Juan

July 18

Puerto Rico	103–95 (OT)	Dominican Republic

Roberto Clemente Coliseum, San Juan

== Quarterfinal group ==
Qualified for the semifinals

The top four teams in both Group A and Group B advanced to the quarterfinal group. Then each team played the four from the other group once to complete a full round robin. Records from the preliminary groups carried over.

Team	Pld	W	L	PF	PA	PD	Pts
United States	7	7	0	710	485	+225	14
Canada	7	5	2	552	500	+52	12
Puerto Rico	7	5	2	625	594	+31	12
Argentina	7	5	2	599	576	+23	12
Venezuela	7	3	4	491	561	−70	10
Brazil	7	2	5	551	589	−38	9
Uruguay	7	1	6	515	646	−131	8
Dominican Republic	7	0	7	502	594	−92	7

July 19

Venezuela	71–95	Argentina

Roberto Clemente Coliseum, San Juan

July 19

Canada	95–75	Brazil

Roberto Clemente Coliseum, San Juan

July 19

Puerto Rico	93–64	Uruguay

Roberto Clemente Coliseum, San Juan

July 19

United States	107–71	Dominican Republic

Roberto Clemente Coliseum, San Juan

July 20

Uruguay	84–87	Venezuela

Roberto Clemente Coliseum, San Juan

July 20

Dominican Republic	64–81	Canada

Roberto Clemente Coliseum, San Juan

July 20

Puerto Rico	96–101	Argentina

Roberto Clemente Coliseum, San Juan

July 20

Brazil	73–90	United States

Roberto Clemente Coliseum, San Juan

July 21

Argentina	85–71	Dominican Republic

Roberto Clemente Coliseum, San Juan

July 21

Brazil	100–74	Uruguay

Roberto Clemente Coliseum, San Juan

July 21

Puerto Rico	80–75	Canada

Roberto Clemente Coliseum, San Juan

July 21

Venezuela	61–83	United States

Roberto Clemente Coliseum, San Juan

July 22

Uruguay	78–71	Dominican Republic

Roberto Clemente Coliseum, San Juan

July 22

Brazil	77–79	Argentina

Roberto Clemente Coliseum, San Juan

July 22

Puerto Rico	76–115	United States

Roberto Clemente Coliseum, San Juan

July 22

Canada	84–55	Venezuela

Roberto Clemente Coliseum, San Juan

== Knockout stage ==
Semi-finals
July 24
United States	88
Argentina	59
July 24
Canada	83
Puerto Rico	71

Final
July 25
United States	92
Canada	66
Third place
July 25
Argentina	103
Puerto Rico	101

== Scoresheets ==
=== Final ===
USA – Canada 92-66

- USA : Payton 19, Hardaway 14, Duncan 12, Smith 11, Kidd 10, Garnett 10, Gugliotta 10, Houston 4, Szczerbiak 2, Brand, Baker
- Canada : Mac Culloch 22, Mavis 12, Nash 11, Barrett 6, Meeks 4, Hamilotn 4, Anderson 3, Swords 2, Newton 2, Guarasci, Mc Tavish, Vassell

=== Semifinals ===
- USA - Argentina 84 - 76 (ht: 42-38)

- USA : Bailey 3, Hawkins 10, Williams 19, Moore 6, Lindeman 0, Blackwell 11, Thomas 13, Stigenga 0, Holmes 4, Martin 0, Houston 8, Smith 10
- Argentina: Fernandez 4, Victoriano 15, Ginobili 23, Gutierrez 8, Palladino 6, Jasen 1, Sucatzky 8, Nocioni 7, Olivares 2, Aisupurua 2

- Brazil - Puerto Rico 95 - 85

- Brazil : Caio 14, Vanderlei 12, Josuel 12
- Puerto Rico : Travieso 28

== Statistical leaders ==
- Topscorer :

(Puerto Rico) Jose Ortiz 169 pts (16.9 ppg)

Pos.	Name	PPG
1	(Puerto Rico) Jose Ortiz	16.9
2	(United States) Gary Payton	16.0
3	(Puerto Rico) Jerome Mincy	15.6
4	(Canada) Rowan Barrett	
5	(Dominican Republic) Felipe López	
6	(Uruguay) Nicolás Mazzarino	
7	(Puerto Rico) Orlando Vega	
8	(Venezuela) Víctor Díaz	15.6
9	(United States) Tim Duncan	
10	(Argentina) Hugo Sconochini	15.9

- Assists :

(United States) Jason Kidd 6.8 apg
(Brazil) Demétrius Conrado Ferraciú 6.3 apg
(Canada) Steve Nash 5.8 apg

- Rebounds :

(Canada) Todd MacCulloch 9.3 rpg
(United States) Tim Duncan 9.1 rpg
(Puerto Rico) Jose Ortiz 7.7 rpg

1999 Tournament of the Americas winners

United States
Fourth title

Most Valuable Player
(Canada) Steve Nash

== Final standings ==
Qualified for the 2000 Summer Olympics

Rank	Team	Record
1st place, gold medalist(s)	United States	10–0
2nd place, silver medalist(s)	Canada	7–3
3rd place, bronze medalist(s)	Argentina	7–3
4	Puerto Rico	6–4
5	Venezuela	4–4
6	Brazil	3–5
7	Dominican Republic	2–6
8	Uruguay	1–7
9	Panama	0–4
10	Cuba	0–4

1st	2nd	3rd
United States Tim Duncan; Allan Houston; Steve Smith; Vin Baker; Kevin Garnett; Jason Kidd; Gary Payton; Tim Hardaway; Tom Gugliotta; Elton Brand; Richard Hamilton; Wally Szczerbiak	Canada Richard Elias Anderson; Rowan Barrett; Peter Guarasci; Andrew Mavis; Jordie McTavish; Michael Meeks; Shawn Swords; Keith Vassell; Steve Nash; Greg Newton; Todd MacCulloch; Sherman Hamilton	Argentina Alejandro Montecchia; Lucas Victoriano; Leandro Palladino; Sergio Aispurua; Facundo Sucatzky; Andrés Nocioni; Hugo Sconochini; Juan Espil; Manu Ginóbili; Gabriel Fernández; Luis Scola; Leonardo Gutiérrez
