= Leandro Barbosa =

Brazilian basketball player (born 1982)

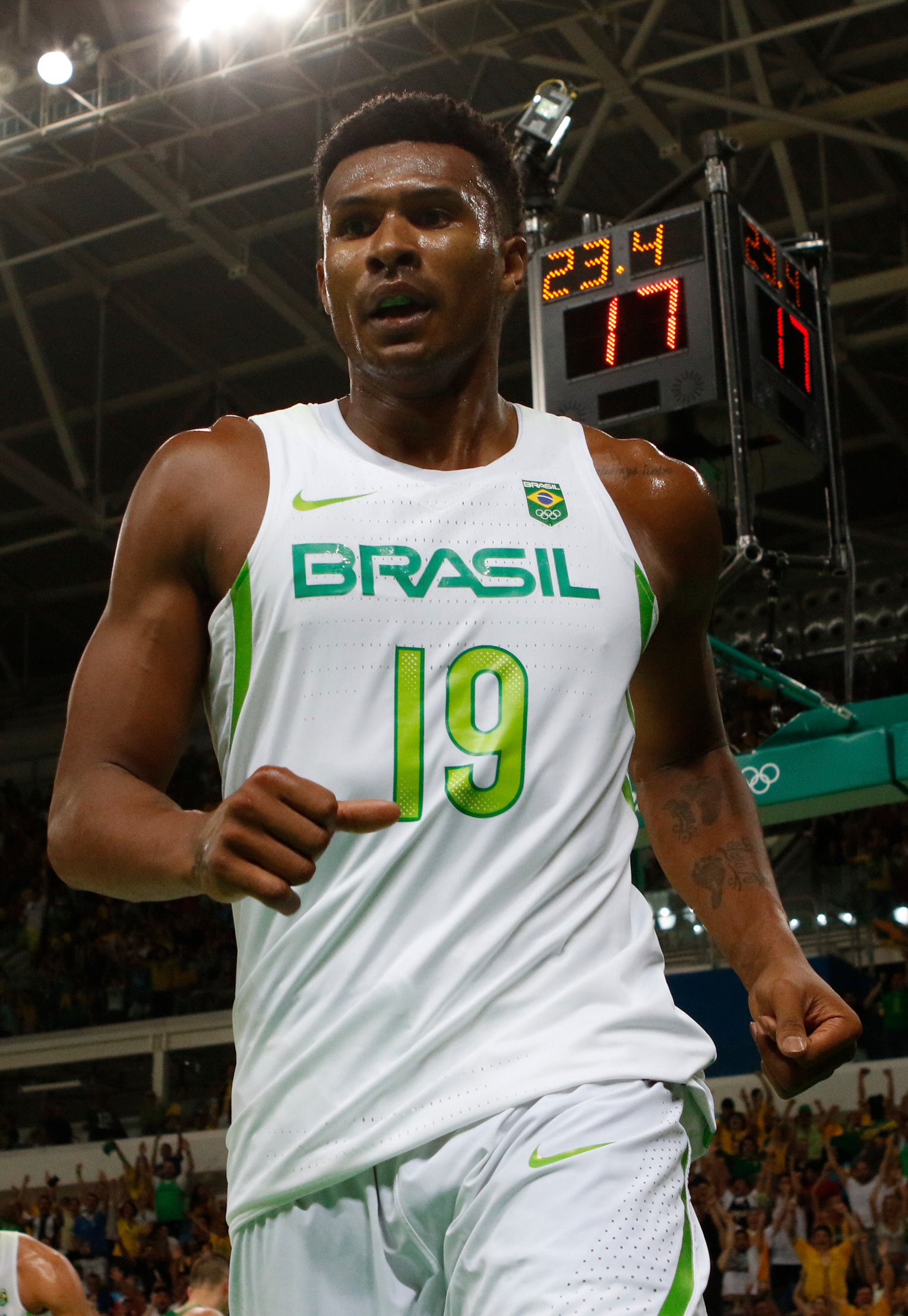
- Barbosa in 2016

Sacramento Kings
- Title: Assistant coach
- League: NBA

Personal information
- Born: November 28, 1982 (age 43) São Paulo, Brazil
- Listed height: 6 ft 3 in (1.91 m)
- Listed weight: 194 lb (88 kg)

Career information
- NBA draft: 2003: 1st round, 28th overall pick
- Drafted by: San Antonio Spurs
- Playing career: 1999–2020
- Position: Shooting guard / point guard
- Number: 10, 20, 28, 12, 19
- Coaching career: 2020–present

Career history

Playing
- 1999–2001: Palmeiras
- 2001–2003: Bauru
- 2003–2010: Phoenix Suns
- 2010–2012: Toronto Raptors
- 2011: Flamengo
- 2012: Indiana Pacers
- 2012–2013: Boston Celtics
- 2013–2014: Pinheiros
- 2014: Phoenix Suns
- 2014–2016: Golden State Warriors
- 2016–2017: Phoenix Suns
- 2017–2018: Franca
- 2018–2020: Minas

Career highlights
- As player: NBA champion (2015); NBA Sixth Man of the Year (2007); Rio de Janeiro State Championship Winner (2011); Brazilian League Champion (2002); As assistant coach: NBA champion (2022)

Career NBA statistics
- Points: 9,035 (10.6 ppg)
- Rebounds: 1,720 (2.0 rpg)
- Assists: 1,775 (2.1 apg)
- Stats at NBA.com
- Stats at Basketball Reference
Medals
Men's basketball
Representing Brazil
FIBA AmeriCup
Gold medal – first place	2005 Santo Domingo
Gold medal – first place	2009 San Juan

Leandro Mateus Barbosa (Portuguese pronunciation: [leˈɐ̃dɾu baʁˈbozɐ]; born November 28, 1982), also known as Leandrinho Barbosa, is a Brazilian former professional basketball player who is an assistant coach for the Sacramento Kings of the National Basketball Association (NBA). He also represented the senior Brazilian national basketball team. Barbosa previously won the NBA Sixth Man of the Year Award, with the Suns in 2007, and an NBA championship with the Warriors in 2015. In Brazil, he is also commonly known by his nickname "Leandrinho" ("Little Leandro") Barbosa, and in the United States, Barbosa was nicknamed "the Brazilian Blur", referring to his playing speed. At a height of 1.92 m (6 ft 3 1/2 in) tall, Barbosa played at the shooting guard.

== Early career ==
Barbosa started his career with Palmeiras when he was 17. Barbosa played in the regional São Paulo State Championship, under the command of Lula Ferreira, who went on to become the senior Brazilian national team's head coach.

At age 19, while playing in the regional São Paulo State Championship with Palmeiras, Barbosa averaged 14.2 points per game. After that, he was traded to the Brazilian club Bauru, in January 2001.

During his first season as a professional in Brazil, while playing with Tilibra/Bauru, Barbosa was coached by Jorge "Guerrinha" Guerra. He averaged 15.8 points, 6.4 assists, and 1.7 steals per game. Barbosa was named the São Paulo State Championship's 2001 Rookie of the Year. He ended the season as the regional competition's fourth-ranked player in three-point field goal percentage, sixth in assists, and 11th in field goals. In 2002, Barbosa won Brazil's top-tier level league, the Brazilian Championship, as a member of Bauru. He was also selected to the senior Brazilian national team and played at the 2002 FIBA World Championship.

== Professional career ==
=== Phoenix Suns (2003–2010) ===
Standing at 6 feet 3 inches (1.91 m) and possessing a 6-foot-10-inch (2.08 m) wingspan, Barbosa was selected 28th overall in the 2003 NBA draft by the San Antonio Spurs, but his rights were acquired by the Suns in a trade for a future protected first-round draft pick.

Barbosa holds the Suns franchise record for points scored in a game by a rookie as a first-time starter, with 27 against the Chicago Bulls on January 5, 2004. He set the Suns' record for three-point field goals by a rookie in consecutive games after hitting at least one three-pointer per game during a 10-game streak from January 2 to 19.

During the 2006–07 season, Barbosa averaged 18.1 points, 2.7 rebounds, and 4.0 assists in 32.7 minutes per game despite playing off the bench. He was also the recipient of the 2006–07 NBA Sixth Man of the Year Award.

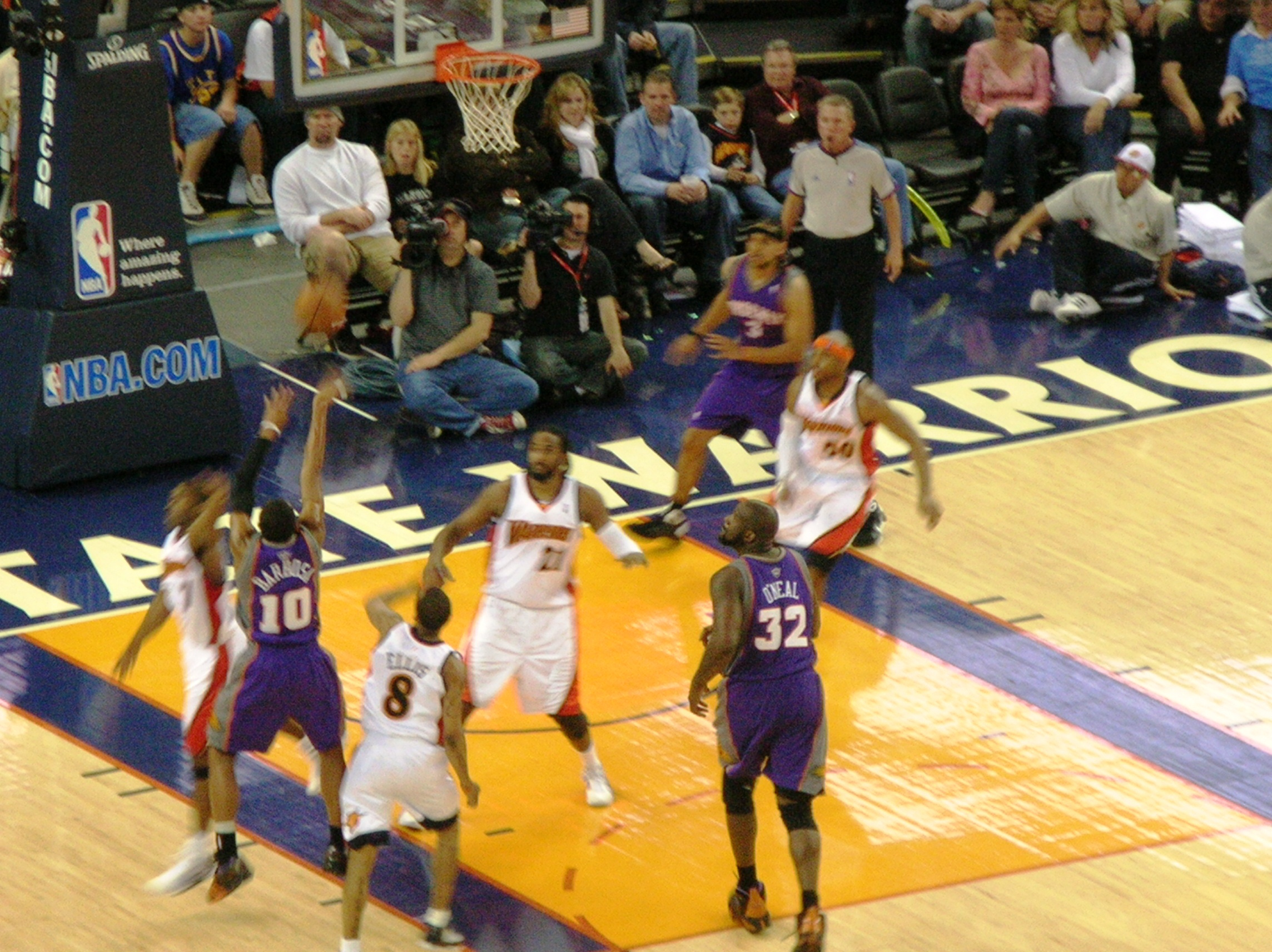
Barbosa (#10) shooting in March 2009

Barbosa scored a career-high of 41 points in a 140–118 victory over the Oklahoma City Thunder on February 20, 2009. He also had seven rebounds, seven assists, and six steals.

=== Toronto Raptors (2010–2012) ===
On July 14, 2010, Barbosa was traded along with Dwayne Jones to the Toronto Raptors in exchange for Hedo Türkoğlu.

On August 18, 2011, Barbosa signed with Flamengo Basketball of Brazil for the duration of the 2011 NBA lockout. His deal had an out-clause that would allow him to return to the NBA once the lockout ended. With the lockout concluding in December 2011, Barbosa returned to the Raptors.

=== Indiana Pacers (2012) ===
On March 15, 2012, Barbosa was traded to the Indiana Pacers for a future second-round pick. With the help of Barbosa, Indiana improved significantly enough to make it to the second round of the playoffs before losing to the Miami Heat.

=== Boston Celtics (2012–2013) ===
On October 18, 2012, Barbosa signed with the Boston Celtics.

On February 12, 2013, after a game against the Charlotte Bobcats on February 11, it was confirmed that Barbosa tore his ACL, prematurely ending his season. Barbosa was the third member of the team whose injury ended his season early in a span of three weeks, joining Rajon Rondo and Jared Sullinger.

=== Washington Wizards (2013) ===
On February 21, 2013, Barbosa and Jason Collins were traded to the Washington Wizards in exchange for Jordan Crawford. Despite being on the team during that time, he never played for the Wizards in the process.

=== Esporte Clube Pinheiros (2013–2014) ===
On November 19, 2013, Barbosa signed with the Esporte Clube Pinheiros of Brazil for the 2013–14 season. During this time, he averaged over 20 points, three rebounds, and three assists for the team. In January 2014, Barbosa returned to the United States to play in the NBA once again.

=== Return to Phoenix (2014) ===
On January 8, 2014, Barbosa signed a 10-day contract with the Phoenix Suns. He would immediately play for the Suns in a narrow 104–103 victory over the Minnesota Timberwolves. Barbosa would have his best night during the first 10-day contract on January 13 against the New York Knicks when he scored 21 points, marking his first 20+ point game since 2012, back when he played for the Celtics. However, Barbosa would have a right shoulder strain after the game.

On January 18, Barbosa signed a second 10-day contract with the Suns. He made his first home debut with the Suns in over four years the next day in a 117–103 victory over the Denver Nuggets. During his second 10-day contract, Barbosa's best performance came on January 24 at home against the Washington Wizards, where he scored 10 points against them.

On January 28, 2014, following the Suns' road game against the Philadelphia 76ers, which subsequently marked the end of his second 10-day contract, the Suns liked Barbosa's production for the team, and they decided to sign him for the rest of the 2013–14 NBA season. On March 4, in a game against the Los Angeles Clippers at home, Barbosa fractured his right hand and missed the rest of the season as a result.

=== Golden State Warriors (2014–2016) ===
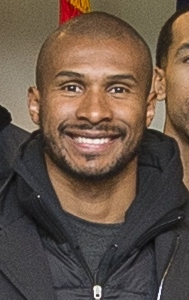
Barbosa in 2015

On September 10, 2014, Barbosa signed with the Golden State Warriors following his great performance at the 2014 FIBA Basketball World Cup. On December 30, Barbosa scored a season-high 17 points in a 126–86 victory over the Philadelphia 76ers. He won his first NBA championship with the Warriors after they defeated the Cleveland Cavaliers in the 2015 NBA Finals in six games.

On July 13, 2015, Barbosa re-signed with the Warriors. In 2015–16, he helped the Warriors win an NBA record 73 games to eclipse the 72 wins set by the 1995–96 Chicago Bulls. The Warriors made it to the 2016 NBA Finals after overcoming a 3–1 loss against the Oklahoma City Thunder in the Western Conference Finals. In Game 1 of the NBA Finals against the Cleveland Cavaliers on June 2, Barbosa returned from a minor back injury to score 11 points on 5-of-5 shooting off the bench during a 104–89 victory. However, the Warriors eventually lost in seven games despite a 3–1 lead.

=== Third stint with Phoenix (2016–2017) ===
On July 19, 2016, Barbosa signed a multi-year deal with the Phoenix Suns, returning to the franchise for a third stint just weeks before playing for his home nation at the 2016 Summer Olympics in Rio de Janeiro.

On December 9, Barbosa scored a season-high 21 points and hit five three-pointers in a 119–115 victory over the Los Angeles Lakers. On December 28, in a loss to the San Antonio Spurs, Barbosa played his 517th game with the Suns, moving him past Amar'e Stoudemire to 10th on the Suns' all-time games played list. On March 3, 2017, against the Oklahoma City Thunder, Barbosa made his 544th appearance in a Suns jersey, passing Mark West for ninth all-time in games played. Barbosa's 14 points also pushed him past Connie Hawkins for 14th in all-time scoring with Phoenix. Barbosa's final game in his NBA career was played on March 24, in a 120–130 loss to the Boston Celtics, where he recorded 11 points, five rebounds, and a steal.

On July 3, 2017, Barbosa was waived by the Suns.

=== Franca Basquetebol Clube (2017–2018) ===
On November 17, 2017, Barbosa returned to Brazil and signed with Franca.

=== Minas Storm Basquete (2018–2020) ===
On December 13, 2018, Barbosa signed with Minas. In the 2019–20 season, he was the league's leading scorer at 20.1 points per game before the season shut down due to the COVID-19 pandemic. Barbosa and his then-pregnant wife contracted the virus, but they both recovered.

=== Retirement ===
On September 14, 2020, Barbosa announced his retirement from professional basketball.

== Coaching career ==
On September 14, 2020, the Golden State Warriors announced that Barbosa would return as a player mentor coach. He won his second NBA championship after the Warriors defeated the Boston Celtics in six games during the 2022 NBA Finals.

On August 12, 2022, Barbosa was hired by the Sacramento Kings as an assistant coach.

== NBA career statistics ==
Legend
GP	Games played	GS	Games started	MPG	Minutes per game
FG%	Field goal percentage	3P%	3-point field goal percentage	FT%	Free throw percentage
RPG	Rebounds per game	APG	Assists per game	SPG	Steals per game
BPG	Blocks per game	PPG	Points per game	**Bold**	Career high
†	Won an NBA championship	*	Led the league

=== Regular season ===
Year	Team	GP	GS	MPG	FG%	3P%	FT%	RPG	APG	SPG	BPG	PPG
2003–04	Phoenix	70	**46**	21.4	.447	.395	.770	1.8	2.4	**1.3**	.1	7.9
2004–05	Phoenix	63	6	17.3	.475	.367	.797	2.1	2.0	.5	.1	7.0
2005–06	Phoenix	57	11	27.9	.481	**.444**	.755	2.6	2.8	.8	.1	13.1
2006–07	Phoenix	80	18	**32.7**	.476	.434	.845	2.7	**4.0**	1.2	.2	**18.1**
2007–08	Phoenix	**82***	12	29.5	.462	.389	.822	**2.8**	2.6	.9	.2	15.6
2008–09	Phoenix	70	11	24.4	**.482**	.375	.881	2.6	2.3	1.2	.1	14.2
2009–10	Phoenix	44	5	17.9	.425	.324	.877	1.6	1.5	.5	**.3**	9.5
2010–11	Toronto	58	0	24.1	.450	.338	.796	1.7	2.1	.9	.1	13.3
2011–12	Toronto	42	0	22.5	.436	.360	.835	1.9	1.5	.9	.2	12.2
2011–12	Indiana	22	0	19.8	.399	.424	.758	2.2	1.5	.9	.0	8.9
2012–13	Boston	41	2	12.5	.430	.383	.756	1.1	1.4	.4	.1	5.2
2013–14	Phoenix	20	0	18.4	.427	.280	.795	1.9	1.6	.4	.2	7.5
2014–15†	Golden State	66	1	14.9	.474	.384	.784	1.4	1.5	.6	.1	7.1
2015–16	Golden State	68	0	15.9	.462	.355	.839	1.7	1.2	.6	.1	6.4
2016–17	Phoenix	67	0	14.4	.439	.357	**.889**	1.6	1.2	.5	.1	6.3
Career		850	112	21.6	.459	.387	.821	2.0	2.1	.8	.1	10.6

=== Playoffs ===
Year	Team	GP	GS	MPG	FG%	3P%	FT%	RPG	APG	SPG	BPG	PPG
2005	Phoenix	12	0	9.7	.343	**.400**	.500	1.4	1.0	.3	.0	2.5
2006	Phoenix	20	**3**	31.6	.470	.391	.862	1.6	**2.7**	.8	**.2**	14.2
2007	Phoenix	11	1	**31.7**	.405	.305	.718	3.5	2.2	**1.1**	**.2**	**15.8**
2008	Phoenix	5	1	28.6	.345	.222	**.909**	**4.0**	1.8	.6	.0	10.4
2010	Phoenix	16	0	15.6	.417	.343	.708	1.3	1.3	.3	.1	7.2
2012	Indiana	11	0	20.3	.370	.150	.500	2.2	1.3	.5	.1	5.7
2015†	Golden State	21	0	10.9	.443	.348	.818	1.3	.9	.3	.0	5.0
2016	Golden State	**23**	0	11.0	**.580**	.393	.762	1.2	.7	.5	.0	5.6
Career		119	5	18.5	.437	.332	.770	1.7	1.4	.5	.1	8.0

== National team career ==
Barbosa was a longtime member of the senior Brazilian national basketball team. With Brazil, he played at the following major tournaments: the 2002 FIBA World Cup, the 2003 FIBA AmeriCup, the 2005 FIBA AmeriCup, the 2006 FIBA World Cup, the 2007 FIBA AmeriCup, the 2009 FIBA AmeriCup, the 2010 FIBA World Cup, the 2012 Summer Olympics, the 2014 FIBA World Cup, and the 2016 Summer Olympics.

Barbosa was the top scorer of the 2007 FIBA AmeriCup.

== Personal life ==
Barbosa lived with Brazilian actress Samara Felippo from 2008 to 2013. They have two daughters, born in 2009 and 2013.

Barbosa is married to the international top model Talita Rocca. The ceremony was held in Brazil on July 6, 2019.
