= Rubén Garcés =

Panamanian-Spanish basketball player

Personal information
- Born: October 17, 1973 (age 53) Colón, Panama
- Listed height: 6 ft 10 in (2.08 m)
- Listed weight: 245 lb (111 kg)

Career information
- High school: Colegio Abel Bravo, Panama
- College: Navarro College (1993–1995); Providence (1995–1997)
- NBA draft: 1997: undrafted
- Playing career: 1997–2013
- Position: Power forward / center
- Number: 21, 22

Career history
- 1998–1999: Quad City Thunder
- 1998–1999: La Crosse Bobcats
- 1999: Boca Juniors
- 1999–2000: La Crosse Bobcats
- 2000–2001: Phoenix Suns
- 2001: Golden State Warriors
- 2001: ASVEL Villeurbanne
- 2001–2002: Forum Valladolid
- 2002: Marinos de Anzoategui
- 2002–2004: Leche Río Breogán
- 2004–2005: Estudiantes
- 2005–2008: Pamesa Valencia
- 2008–2009: Basket Zaragoza 2002
- 2010: Algodoneros de Comarca
- 2010–2011: Soles de Mexicali
- 2011–2012: Club La Unión
- 2012: Capitanes de Arecibo
- 2013: Mets de Guaynabo
- Stats at NBA.com
- Stats at Basketball Reference
Medals
Men's basketball
Representing Panama
Centrobasket
Gold medal – first place	2006 Panama
COCABA Championship
Gold medal – first place	2015 Costa Rica

Rubén Santiago Garcés Riquelme (born October 17, 1973) is a Panamanian professional basketball player. He last played for the Mets de Guaynabo of Puerto Rico. A 6'9" power forward/center, he played US college basketball with Navarro Junior College in Texas, and with Providence College in Rhode Island, and had a brief career in the NBA in the 2000-01 season, playing with Phoenix and Golden State. He has also played in the American CBA, the Spanish ACB, in Argentina, Venezuela, and France.

== Career statistics ==
=== Domestic leagues ===
Season	Team	League	GP	MPG	FG%	3P%	FT%	RPG	APG	SPG	BPG	PPG
1998–99	Quad City Thunder	CBA	17	17.5	.456	--	.400	6.1	.4	.4	.9	6.2
1998–99	La Crosse Bobcats	CBA	8	?	?	?	?	5.5	?	?	?	5.6
1999–00	Boca Juniors	Argentina LNB	2	27.5	.600	--	.500	5.5	1.0	.5	1.0	13.0
1999–00	La Crosse Bobcats	CBA	26	23.1	.550	--	.508	9.1	.4	.5	1.4	8.0
2000–01	ASVEL Basket	LNB Pro A	11	22.9	.540	--	.590	7.5	.5	.6	.7	11.6
2001–02	CB Valladolid	Liga ACB	34	28.2	.574	.000	.572	8.9	.5	.9	1.9	13.1
2002	Marinos de Anzoategui	Venezuela LPB	no stats available									
2002–03	Leche Río Breogán	Liga ACB	34	29.8	.523	.000	.656	8.6	.4	1.0	1.2	13.2
2003–04	Leche Río Breogán	Liga ACB	32	29.7	.468	--	.549	9.8	.5	.9	1.2	11.3
2004–05	Adecco Estudiantes	Liga ACB	42	27.3	.597	.000	.628	7.7	.4	1.0	1.1	14.3
2005–06	Pamesa Valencia	Liga ACB	32	23.0	.500	.000	.554	7.4	.3	.5	.6	9.4
2006–07	Pamesa Valencia	Liga ACB	38	24.5	.561	--	.581	7.2	.5	.9	.6	9.1
2007–08	Pamesa Valencia	Liga ACB	26	17.1	.588	.000	.600	4.6	.3	.5	.8	7.3
2008–09	CAI Zaragoza	Liga ACB	32	15.5	.414	--	.564	4.3	.2	.6	.3	4.9
2010–11	Algodoneros de la Comarca	Mexico LNPB	9	29.7	.587	.000	.641	11.6	2.0	.8	.6	17.0
2010–11	Soles de Mexicali	Mexico LNPB	10	26.7	.464	.000	.658	10.6	1.2	1.3	.8	14.1
2010–11	Club La Unión	Argentina LNB	22	26.0	.522	.000	.663	11.0	.8	2.2	.6	13.0
2011–12	Atenas Cordoba	Argentina LNB	14	27.4	.551	--	.506	9.4	.6	.6	.9	12.9
2012	Capitanes de Arecibo	BSN	16	15.1	.514	--	.450	6.6	.6	.5	.3	5.1
2013	Mets de Guaynabo	BSN	15	12.1	.415	--	.565	5.0	.3	.2	.5	3.8
2013–14	Defensor Sporting	Uruguay LUB	41	32.6	.524	--	.644	12.0	1.2	.9	1.3	17.2
2014–15	Club Malvín	Uruguay LUB	21	26.2	.500	--	.675	8.8	1.1	.8	.5	10.0
