= 1989 Tournament of the Americas =

Tournament details
- Host country: Mexico
- City: Mexico City
- Dates: June 8–18
- Teams: 12
- Venue: 1 (in 1 host city)

Final positions
- Champions: Puerto Rico (2nd title)
- Runners-up: United States
- Third place: Brazil
- Fourth place: Venezuela

Tournament statistics
- Top scorer: (Brazil) Oscar Schmidt

The 1989 Tournament of the Americas, later known as the FIBA Americas Championship and the FIBA AmeriCup, was a basketball championship hosted by Mexico from June 8 to June 18, 1989. The games were played in Mexico City. This FIBA AmeriCup was to earn the five berths allocated to the Americas for the 1990 FIBA World Championship in Argentina. Puerto Rico defeated the United States in the final to win the tournament. Brazil, Venezuela, and Canada also qualified for the World Championship by finishing third through fifth, respectively.

== Qualification ==
Eight teams qualified during the qualification tournaments held in their respective zones in 1989; two teams (USA and Canada) qualified automatically since they are the only members of the North America zone.

- North America: Canada, United States
- Caribbean and Central America:Cuba, Dominican Republic, Mexico, Panama, Puerto Rico
- South America: Argentina, Brazil, Ecuador, Paraguay, Venezuela

The draw split the tournament into two groups:

Group A

Cuba
Dominican Republic
Mexico
Panama
Puerto Rico
United States

Group B

Argentina
Brazil
Canada
Ecuador
Paraguay
Venezuela

== Format ==
- The top four teams from each group advance to the knockout round. The losers from the knockout quarterfinals compete in a separate bracket to define fifth through eighth place.
- Results and standings among teams within the same group are carried over.
- The winners in the knockout semifinals advanced to the Final and were granted berths in the 1990 FIBA World Championship in Argentina. The losers figure in a third-place playoff and were both also granted berths in the FIBA World Championship. Since Argentina and the United States were already qualified as hosts and Olympic Champions respectively, should they reach one of the top four positions in the final standings, one or two extra berths should be granted to the fifth and/or sixth team in the final standings.

== Preliminary round ==
Qualified for the quarterfinals

=== Group A ===
Team	Pld	W	L	PF	PA	PD	Pts
Puerto Rico	5	4	1	495	447	+48	9
United States	5	4	1	523	480	+43	9
Dominican Republic	5	4	1	485	466	+19	9
Cuba	5	2	3	450	449	+1	7
Mexico	5	1	4	453	476	−23	6
Panama	5	0	5	432	520	−88	5

June 8

Dominican Republic	116–108	United States

Mexico City

June 8

Puerto Rico	104–83	Panama

Mexico City

June 8

Cuba	89–88	Mexico

Mexico City

June 9

Dominican Republic	85–77	Cuba

Mexico City

June 9

Mexico	98–88	Panama

Mexico City

June 9

United States	105–92	Puerto Rico

Mexico City

June 10

Puerto Rico	97–88	Mexico

Mexico City

June 10

United States	95–92	Cuba

Mexico City

June 10

Dominican Republic	105–84	Panama

Mexico City

June 11

Puerto Rico	101–98	Cuba

Mexico City

June 11

Dominican Republic	106–96	Mexico

Mexico City

June 11

United States	119–97	Panama

Mexico City

June 12

Puerto Rico	101–73	Dominican Republic

Mexico City

June 12

Cuba	94–80	Panama

Mexico City

June 12

United States	96–83	Mexico

Mexico City

=== Group B ===
Team	Pld	W	L	PF	PA	PD	Pts
Brazil	5	5	0	572	429	+143	10
Venezuela	5	4	1	549	488	+61	9
Canada	5	3	2	447	423	+24	8
Argentina	5	2	3	480	469	+11	7
Paraguay	5	1	4	417	529	−112	6
Ecuador	5	0	5	394	521	−127	5

June 8

Brazil	131–90	Paraguay

Mexico City

June 8

Argentina	103–71	Ecuador

Mexico City

June 8

Venezuela	99–78	Canada

Mexico City

June 9

Venezuela	110–89	Ecuador

Mexico City

June 9

Argentina	106–85	Paraguay

Mexico City

June 9

Brazil	101–84	Canada

Mexico City

June 10

Paraguay	91–87	Ecuador

Mexico City

June 10

Brazil	131–99	Venezuela

Mexico City

June 10

Canada	93–83	Argentina

Mexico City

June 11

Brazil	119–74	Ecuador

Mexico City

June 11

Canada	94–67	Paraguay

Mexico City

June 11

Venezuela	130–106	Argentina

Mexico City

June 12

Canada	98–73	Ecuador

Mexico City

June 12

Brazil	90–82	Argentina

Mexico City

June 12

Venezuela	111–84	Paraguay

Mexico City

== Knockout round ==
=== Championship Bracket ===
Quarter-finals
Puerto Rico	94
Argentina	89
Venezuela	109
Dominican Republic	102
United States	75
Canada	73
Brazil	104
Cuba	89

Semi-finals
Puerto Rico	94
Venezuela	91
United States	99
Brazil	96

Final
Puerto Rico	88
United States	80
Third place
Brazil	158
Venezuela	124

== Classification round ==
=== 5th-8th places ===
Semi-finals
Argentina	85
Dominican Republic	89
Canada	89
Cuba	86

Fifth place
Dominican Republic	84
Canada	108
Seventh place
Argentina	81
Cuba	88

== Awards ==
=== Topscorer ===
Oscar Schmidt was the top scorer with 247 points (32.8 average).

1989 Tournament of the Americas winners

Puerto Rico
first title

== Final standings ==
Qualified for the 1990 FIBA World Championship
Qualified for the 1990 FIBA World Championship as World Champions
Qualified for the 1990 FIBA World Championship as hosts

Rank	Team	Record
1st place, gold medalist(s)	Puerto Rico	7–1
2nd place, silver medalist(s)	United States	6–2
3rd place, bronze medalist(s)	Brazil	7–1
4	Venezuela	5–3
5	Canada	5–3
6	Dominican Republic	5–3
7	Cuba	3–5
8	Argentina	2–6
9	Mexico	1–4
9	Paraguay	1–4
10	Panama	0–5
10	Ecuador	0–5
