= Francisco García (basketball) =

Dominican basketball player (born 1981)

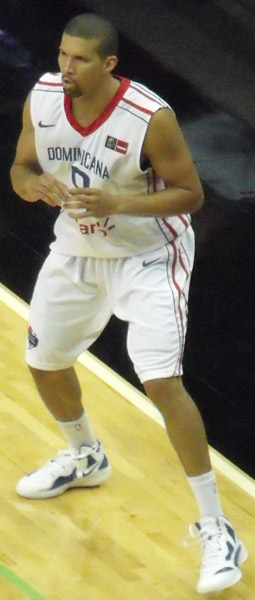
- García with the Dominican national team in 2011

Personal information
- Born: December 31, 1981 (Note: Some sources list him as being born on December 31, 1981, while others state he was born on December 31, 1980.) San Francisco de Macoris, Dominican Republic
- Listed height: 6 ft 7 in (2.01 m)
- Listed weight: 195 lb (88 kg)

Career information
- High school: The Winchendon School (Winchendon, Massachusetts)
- College: Louisville (2002–2005)
- NBA draft: 2005: 1st round, 23rd overall pick
- Drafted by: Sacramento Kings
- Playing career: 2005–2017
- Position: Shooting guard / small forward

Career history
- 2005–2013: Sacramento Kings
- 2013–2014: Houston Rockets
- 2016: Vaqueros de Bayamón
- 2017: Indios de San Francisco

Career highlights
- Second-team All-American – NABC (2005); 2× First-team All-Conference USA (2004, 2005)
- Stats at NBA.com
- Stats at Basketball Reference
Medals
Representing Dominican Republic
Men's basketball
FIBA AmeriCup
Bronze medal – third place	2011 Mar del Plata
Pan American Games
Gold medal – first place	2003 Santo Domingo
Centrobasket
Bronze medal – third place	2008 Cancun
Gold medal – first place	2012 San Juan

Francisco Alberto García Gutiérrez (born December 31, c. 1981) is a Dominican former professional basketball player who played ten seasons in the NBA. The 6'7", 195-pound swingman played college basketball for the Louisville Cardinals before being selected by the Sacramento Kings with the 23rd overall pick of the 2005 NBA draft, where he spent the first seven-plus years of his NBA career. He also played parts of three seasons for the Houston Rockets.

== College career ==
He graduated from The Winchendon School. As a college basketball player at Louisville under coach Rick Pitino, García enjoyed great success along with future NBA player Reece Gaines. He averaged 15.7 points per game as a junior and, along with teammate and best friend Taquan Dean, led his fourth-seeded team to the 2005 Final Four in Saint Louis, Missouri, where they lost in the National Semifinals to top-ranked Illinois.

In April 2005, he declared for the NBA draft, foregoing his final year of college eligibility.

== Professional career ==
=== Sacramento Kings (2005–2013) ===
García was selected with the 23rd overall pick by the Sacramento Kings in the 2005 NBA draft. In his rookie season for the Kings, García appeared in 67 games and averaged 5.6 points per game. In September 2008, he signed a five-year contract extension with the Kings.

=== Houston Rockets (2013–2014) ===
On February 20, 2013, García was traded to the Houston Rockets along with Thomas Robinson and Tyler Honeycutt in exchange for Patrick Patterson, Toney Douglas and Cole Aldrich.

On August 5, 2013, García re-signed with the Rockets.

On August 22, 2014, García again re-signed with the Rockets. On December 19, 2014, he was waived by the Rockets following the acquisition of Corey Brewer and Alexey Shved in a trade.

=== Vaqueros de Bayamón (2016) ===
On January 14, 2016, García signed with Vaqueros de Bayamón of the Puerto Rican League. On May 12, he was waived by Bayamón.

=== Indios de San Francisco (2017) ===
In 2017, García played for Indios de San Francisco of the Liga Nacional de Baloncesto.

== NBA career statistics ==
Legend
GP	Games played	GS	Games started	MPG	Minutes per game
FG%	Field goal percentage	3P%	3-point field goal percentage	FT%	Free throw percentage
RPG	Rebounds per game	APG	Assists per game	SPG	Steals per game
BPG	Blocks per game	PPG	Points per game	**Bold**	Career high

=== Regular season ===
Year	Team	GP	GS	MPG	FG%	3P%	FT%	RPG	APG	SPG	BPG	PPG
2005–06	Sacramento	67	11	19.4	.400	.285	.772	2.8	1.4	.6	.7	5.6
2006–07	Sacramento	**79**	5	17.8	.429	.356	.833	2.6	1.1	.6	.5	6.0
2007–08	Sacramento	**79**	20	26.5	.463	.391	.779	3.3	1.6	**1.2**	.6	12.3
2008–09	Sacramento	65	**36**	**30.4**	.444	**.398**	.820	**3.4**	**2.3**	**1.2**	**1.0**	**12.7**
2009–10	Sacramento	25	4	23.0	**.466**	.390	**.882**	2.6	1.8	.4	.8	8.1
2010–11	Sacramento	58	34	23.9	.436	.362	.855	2.3	1.2	.9	.8	9.7
2011–12	Sacramento	49	3	16.3	.376	.290	.800	2.0	.6	.7	.8	4.8
2012–13	Sacramento	40	15	17.8	.376	.367	.857	1.7	1.1	.8	.8	5.2
2012–13	Houston	18	5	17.7	.432	.386	.857	1.3	1.1	.8	.4	6.4
2013–14	Houston	55	4	19.7	.401	.358	.526	2.2	1.1	.5	.6	5.7
2014–15	Houston	14	0	14.3	.270	.222	.250	1.2	1.1	.6	.4	3.2
Career		549	137	21.6	.427	.357	.799	2.6	1.4	.8	.7	7.9

=== Playoffs ===
Year	Team	GP	GS	MPG	FG%	3P%	FT%	RPG	APG	SPG	BPG	PPG
2006	Sacramento	**6**	0	6.8	**.455**	.250	**1.000**	.3	.2	.3	.3	2.2
2013	Houston	**6**	**3**	**27.3**	.440	**.459**	.600	**3.3**	**1.5**	**.7**	**.8**	**10.7**
2014	Houston	2	0	11.0	.333	.000	.705	1.0	.0	.0	.0	3.5
Career		14	3	16.2	.433	.409	.727	1.7	.7	.4	.5	6.0
