= Dominican Republic men's national basketball team =

National sports team

Dominican Republic
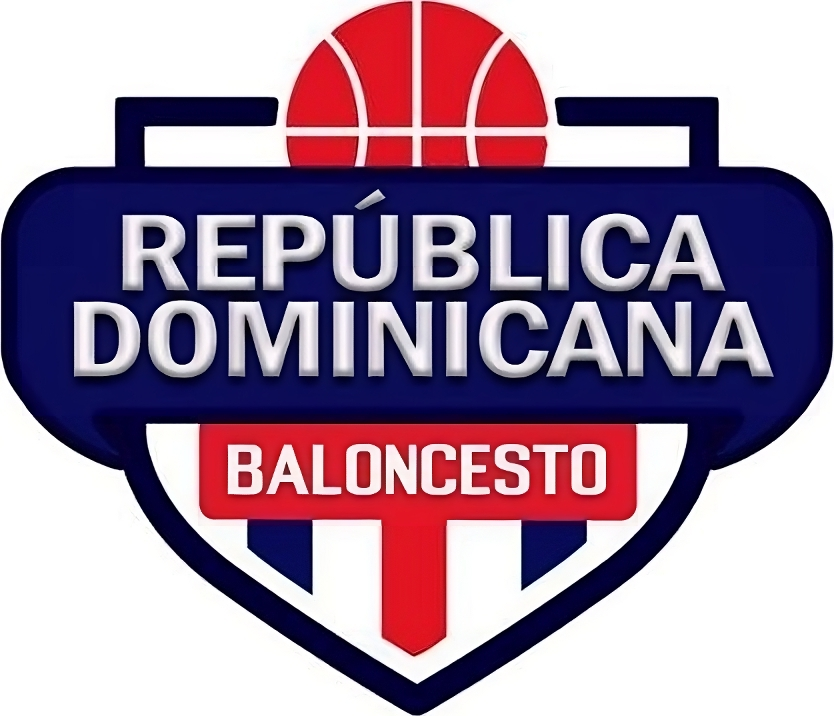
- FIBA ranking: 21 (1 September 2026)
- Joined FIBA: 1954
- FIBA zone: FIBA Americas
- National federation: Federación Dominicana de Baloncesto
- Coach: Néstor García

FIBA World Cup
- Appearances: 4

FIBA AmeriCup
- Appearances: 15
- Medals: Bronze: (2011)
Home	Away

The Dominican Republic national basketball team (Spanish: Selección de Baloncesto de República Dominicana) represents the Dominican Republic in men's international basketball competitions. In 2011 and 2012, John Calipari, the head coach of the University of Arkansas men's basketball team, served as the head coach of the team. The team placed third in the 2011 FIBA Americas Championship and fourth in the 2012 FIBA World Olympic Qualifying Tournament, one position shy of qualifying for the 2012 Olympics.

== Competitions ==
=== FIBA World Cup ===
Year	Position	Tournament	Host
1978	12/14	1978 FIBA World Championship	Philippines
2014	13/24	2014 FIBA Basketball World Cup	Spain
2019	16/32	2019 FIBA Basketball World Cup	China
2023	14/32	2023 FIBA Basketball World Cup	Indonesia, Philippines, Japan

=== FIBA AmeriCup ===
Year	Position	Tournament	Host
1980	Didn't Compete	1980 FIBA Americas Championship	San Juan, Puerto Rico
1984	9th	1984 FIBA Americas Championship	São Paulo, Brazil
1988	Didn't Compete	1988 FIBA Americas Championship	Montevideo, Uruguay
1989	6th	1989 FIBA Americas Championship	Mexico City, Mexico
1992	Didn't Compete	1992 FIBA Americas Championship	Portland, Oregon, United States
1993	9th	1993 FIBA Americas Championship	San Juan, Puerto Rico
1995	7th	1995 FIBA Americas Championship	Tucumán, Argentina
1997	9th	1997 FIBA Americas Championship	Montevideo, Uruguay
1999	7th	1999 FIBA Americas Championship	San Juan, Puerto Rico
2001	Didn't Compete	2001 FIBA Americas Championship	Neuquén, Argentina
2003	8th	2003 FIBA Americas Championship	San Juan, Puerto Rico
2005	6th	2005 FIBA Americas Championship	Santo Domingo, Dominican Republic
2007	Didn't Compete	2007 FIBA Americas Championship	Las Vegas, Nevada, United States
2009	5th	2009 FIBA Americas Championship	San Juan, Puerto Rico
2011	3rd place, bronze medalist(s)	2011 FIBA Americas Championship	Mar del Plata, Argentina
2013	4th	2013 FIBA Americas Championship	Caracas, Venezuela
2015	6th	2015 FIBA Americas Championship	Mexico City, Mexico
2017	7th	2017 FIBA AmeriCup	Argentina/Colombia/Uruguay
2021	8th	2021 FIBA AmeriCup	Recife, Brazil
2025	5th	2025 FIBA AmeriCup	Managua, Nicaragua

=== Pan American Games ===
Year	Position	Tournament	Host
1951–75	Didn't Compete	1951-75 Pan American Games	
1979	9th	1979 Pan American Games	San Juan, Puerto Rico
1983	9th	1983 Pan American Games	Caracas, Venezuela
1987–95	Didn't Compete	1987-95 Pan American Games	
1999	6th	1999 Pan American Games	Winnipeg, Canada
2003	2nd place, silver medalist(s)	2003 Pan American Games	Santo Domingo, Dominican Republic
2007	Didn't Compete	2007 Pan American Games	Rio de Janeiro, Brazil
2011	4th	2011 Pan American Games	Guadalajara, Mexico
2015	4th	2015 Pan American Games	Toronto, Canada
2019	4th	2019 Pan American Games	Lima, Peru
2023	6th	2023 Pan American Games	Santiago, Chile

Gold	Silver	Bronze	Total
0	1	0	1

=== Centrobasket Championship ===
Year	Position	Tournament	Host
1969	5th	Centrobasket Championship	Havana, Cuba
1971	4th	Centrobasket Championship	Caracas, Venezuela
1973	7th	Centrobasket Championship	San Juan, Puerto Rico
1975	4th	Centrobasket Championship	Santo Domingo, Dominican Republic
1977	1st place, gold medalist(s)	Centrobasket Championship	Panama City, Panama
1981	5th	Centrobasket Championship	San Juan, Puerto Rico
1985	6th	Centrobasket Championship	Toluca, Mexico
1987	4th	Centrobasket Championship	Santo Domingo, Dominican Republic
1989	5th	Centrobasket Championship	Havana, Cuba
1993	4th	Centrobasket Championship	San Juan, Puerto Rico
1995	2nd place, silver medalist(s)	Centrobasket Championship	Santo Domingo, Dominican Republic
1997	3rd place, bronze medalist(s)	Centrobasket Championship	Tegucigalpa, Honduras
1999	3rd place, bronze medalist(s)	Centrobasket Championship	Havana, Cuba
2001	5th	Centrobasket Championship	Toluca, Mexico
2003	2nd place, silver medalist(s)	Centrobasket Championship	Culiacán, Mexico
2004	1st place, gold medalist(s)	Centrobasket Championship	Santo Domingo, Dominican Republic
2006	5th	Centrobasket Championship	Panama City, Panama
2008	3rd place, bronze medalist(s)	Centrobasket Championship	Cancún, Mexico
2010	2nd place, silver medalist(s)	Centrobasket Championship	Santo Domingo, Dominican Republic
2012	1st place, gold medalist(s)	Centrobasket Championship	San Juan, Puerto Rico
2014	3rd place, bronze medalist(s)	Centrobasket Championship	Nayarit, Mexico
2016	3rd place, bronze medalist(s)	Centrobasket Championship	Panama City, Panama

Gold	Silver	Bronze	Total
3	3	5	11

== Team ==
=== Current roster ===
Roster for 2025 FIBA AmeriCup.

Dominican Republic men's national basketball team roster
Players
Coaches

Pos.	No.	Name	Age – Date of birth	Height	Club	Ctr.
SF	1	Juan Miguel Suero	32 – 11 May 1993	1.91 m (6 ft 3 in)	Trotamundos de Carabobo	(Venezuela)
PF	2	Ángel Núñez	33 – 9 October 1991	2.03 m (6 ft 8 in)	Vaqueros de Bayamón	(Puerto Rico)
G	3	Jean Montero	22 – 3 July 2003	1.88 m (6 ft 2 in)	CB Islas Canarias	(Spain)
PG	4	Gelvis Solano	31 – 1 June 1994	1.85 m (6 ft 1 in)	Dewa United Banten	(Indonesia)
SG	5	Víctor Liz (C)	39 – 12 May 1986	1.88 m (6 ft 2 in)	Capitanes de Arecibo	(Puerto Rico)
F	8	David Jones García	23 – 24 November 2001	1.94 m (6 ft 4 in)	San Antonio Spurs	(United States)
PG	10	Andrés Feliz	28 – 15 July 1997	1.83 m (6 ft 0 in)	Real Madrid	(Spain)
C	11	Eloy Vargas	36 – 30 December 1988	2.10 m (6 ft 11 in)	Metros de Santiago	(Dominican Republic)
PF	12	Ángel Delgado	30 – 20 November 1994	2.08 m (6 ft 10 in)	Galatasaray	(Turkey)
C	22	Joel Soriano	25 – 30 January 2000	2.11 m (6 ft 11 in)	Valencia Basket	(Spain)
SF	24	Jassel Pérez	23 – 12 September 2001	1.90 m (6 ft 3 in)	Spartans Distrito Capital	(Venezuela)
F/C	32	Karl-Anthony Towns	29 – 15 November 1995	2.13 m (7 ft 0 in)	New York Knicks	(United States)
PF	35	Juan Guerrero	32 – 8 July 1993	1.90 m (6 ft 3 in)	Club Fernando Valerio	(Chile)

Head coach

- (Argentina) Néstor García

Assistant coach(es)

- (Dominican Republic) David Díaz
- (Dominican Republic) Abraham Disla

Legend

- (C) Team captain
- Club – describes last
  club before the tournament
- Age – describes age
  on 22 August 2025

=== Past coaches ===
The following is a list from 2011 until present:

Year	Coach	Record
2011–2012	John Calipari	13–7
2013–2015	Orlando Antigua	12–9
2015	Kenny Atkinson	2–5
2016–2019	Melvyn Lopez	6–3
2019	Néstor García	4–5
2020–2022	Melvyn Lopez	5–6
2022–	Néstor García	12–3

=== Past squads ===
1999 Americas Championship

- Felipe López
- Soterio Ramírez
- Jaime Peterson
- Rafael Novas
- Franklin Western
- Carlos Paniagua
- Juan Carlos Martínez
- Carlos Payano
- Okaris Lenderborg
- Ricardo Greer
- Ricardo Vásquez
- Derick Baker

2003 Central American and Caribbean Championship

- Otto Ramírez
- Carlos Paniagua
- Luis Flores
- Henry Lalane
- Amaury Filion
- Franklin Western
- Marlon Martínez
- Carlos Payano
- José Vargas
- Pedro Lenderborg
- Juan Carlos Martínez
- Jaime Peterson

2003 Pan American Games

- Otto Ramírez
- Carlos Paniagua
- José Vargas
- Carlos Payano
- Franklin Western
- Miguel Angel Pichardo
- Amaury Filion
- Luis Flores
- Francisco García
- Jeffrey Greer
- Carlos Morban
- Jack Michael Martínez

2003 Americas Championship

- Otto Ramírez
- Carlos Paniagua
- Henry Lalane
- Carlos Morban
- Henry Paulino
- Franklin Western
- Miguel Angel Pichardo
- Carlos Payano
- José Vargas
- Amaury Filion
- Víctor Ortega Rodríguez
- Jaime Peterson

2004 Central American and Caribbean Championship

- Otto Ramírez
- Carlos Paniagua
- Andy Turner
- Cristian Arias
- Marlon Martínez
- Ricardo Soliver
- Rafael Luis
- Carlos Payano
- Henry Lalane
- Amaury Filion
- Juan Carlos Martínez
- Jack Michael Martínez

2005 Americas Championship

- Otto Ramírez
- Marlon Martínez
- Luis Flores
- Andy Turner
- Josh Asselin
- Amaury Filion
- Cristian Arias
- Francisco García
- José Vargas
- Luis Felipe López
- JeanCarlo Gómez
- Terry Smith

2006 Central American and Caribbean Championship

- Ricardo Soliver
- Henry Lalane
- Andy Turner
- Otto Ramírez
- Franklin Western
- Marlon Martínez
- Elpidio Fortuna
- Radhames Almonte
- Amaury Filion
- Elys Guzmán
- Jack Michael Martínez

2006 Central American and Caribbean Games

- José Cabrera
- Elpidio Fortuna
- Cristian Arias
- Andy Turner
- Otto Ramírez
- Franklin Western
- Marlon Martínez
- Elys Guzmán
- Radhames Almonte
- Hendry Lalane
- Jack Michael Martínez

2008 Ecuador

- Francisco Ozuna
- Carlos Morban
- Elpidio Fortuna
- Kelvin Peña
- Cristian Arias
- Franklin Western
- Al Horford
- Francisco García
- Alexander Flores Assist Leader. Captain
- Andres Sandoval
- Eulis Báez
- Jack Michael Martínez

FIBA Americas Championship 2009

- Charlie Villanueva
- Francisco García
- Al Horford
- Luis Flores
- Jack Michael Martínez
- Kelvin Peña
- Carlos Morban
- Franklin Western
- Joey L Acosta

2014 FIBA Basketball World Cup

Dominican Republic men's national basketball team roster
Players
Coaches

Pos.	No.	Name	Age – Date of birth	Height	Club
G	4	Édgar Sosa	26 – 15 January 1988	1.85 m (6 ft 1 in)	Dinamo Sassari	(Italy)
G	5	Manuel Fortuna	29 – 23 March 1985	1.88 m (6 ft 2 in)	Leones de Santo Domingo	(Dominican Republic)
G	6	Juan Coronado	31 – 25 August 1983	1.85 m (6 ft 1 in)	Reales de La Vega	(Dominican Republic)
G	7	Víctor Liz	28 – 12 May 1986	1.83 m (6 ft 0 in)	Metros de Santiago	(Dominican Republic)
F	8	Edward Santana	26 – 14 September 1987	2.03 m (6 ft 8 in)	Cañeros de La Romana	(Dominican Republic)
F	9	Francisco García	32 – 31 December 1981	2.00 m (6 ft 7 in)	Free Agent
G	10	James Feldeine	26 – 26 June 1988	1.93 m (6 ft 4 in)	Cantù	(Italy)
C	11	Eloy Vargas	25 – 30 December 1988	2.11 m (6 ft 11 in)	Metros de Santiago	(Dominican Republic)
F	12	Orlando Sánchez	26 – 26 May 1988	2.06 m (6 ft 9 in)	Westchester Knicks	(United States)
F	13	Eulis Báez	32 – 18 March 1982	1.98 m (6 ft 6 in)	Gran Canaria	(Spain)
G	14	Ronald Ramón	28 – 14 January 1986	1.83 m (6 ft 0 in)	Winner Limeira	(Brazil)
F	15	Jack Michael Martínez	32 – 12 October 1981	2.01 m (6 ft 7 in)	Trotamundos de Carabobo	(Venezuela)

Head coach

- Orlando Antigua

Assistant coach(es)

- José Mercedes
- Bill Bayno
- Ron Sánchez

Legend

- (C) Team captain
- Club field describes current pro club
- Age – describes age
  on 30 August 2014

2015 Pan American Games

- Jose Acosta
- Ángel Delgado
- Miguel Dicent
- Andres FeIiz
- Manuel Fortuna
- Juan Jose Garcia
- Manuel Guzman
- James Maye
- Rigoberto Mendoza
- Nehemias Morillo
- Edward Santana
- Gerardo Suero

== Kit ==
=== Manufacturer ===
2012-2024 Nike

2025-presente Adidas

=== Sponsor ===
2023: Banreservas

== See also ==
- Dominican Republic women's national basketball team
- Dominican Republic national under-19 basketball team
- Dominican Republic national under-17 basketball team
- Dominican Republic national 3x3 team
