= Liga Nacional de Baloncesto =

Top men's professional basketball league in the Dominican Republic

Liga Nacional de Baloncesto (LNB)
- Sport: Basketball
- Founded: 2005
- President: Antonio Mir
- No. of teams: 8
- Country: Dominican Republic
- Continent: FIBA Americas (Americas)
- Most recent champions: Gigantes de San Francisco (3rd title)
- Most titles: Metros de Santiago (5 titles)
- Broadcasters: CERTV, Coral 39
- Website: lnb.com.do

Liga Nacional de Baloncesto (LNB) is the top men's professional basketball league in the Dominican Republic. Established in 2005, six teams compete annually between September and October.

== History ==
The league was founded on September 6, 2004 at the Hotel Lina in Santo Domingo as the Liga Dominicana de Baloncesto (Dominican Basketball League), also known as LIDOBA; the founders were a group of investors and former basketball players, supported by the Dominican Basketball Federation. Before the creation of a national league, basketball was practiced at regional and local level.

The teams that participated in the first edition in 2005 were:

- Cañeros de La Romana
- Cocolos de San Pedro de Macorís
- Constituyentes de San Cristóbal
- Indios de San Francisco de Macorís
- Marineros de Puerto Plata
- Metros de Santiago
- Panteras del Distrito Nacional
- Reales de La Vega

The first game was played on July 1, 2005 at the Palacio de los Deportes Virgilio Travieso Soto between Panteras del Distrito Nacional and Indios de San Francisco de Macorís: Panteras won, 79–63. The first league champions were Reales de La Vega, that won the title after winning the best-of-7 championship series against Panteras, 4–2.

In 2009, the league was cancelled due to financial difficulties. On May 19, 2010 the league announced its return under a new branding and name, Liga Nacional de Baloncesto (National Basketball League).

From 2005 to 2017, the league had 8 teams participating every season. In 2018, Huracanes del Atlántico folded, and the league was played by 7 teams (3 in the North conference, and 4 in the Southeast conference). In 2019, Titanes del Distrito Nacional also folded, bringing the team number to 6.

== Teams ==
=== Current teams ===
Teams participating in the 2024-25 season

- Cañeros del Este
- Gigantes de San Francisco
- Leones de Santo Domingo
- Marineros de Puerto Plata
- Metros de Santiago
- Reales de La Vega
- Soles de Santo Domingo Este
- Titanes del Licey

== Format ==
=== Regular season ===
In the first season in 2005, all 8 teams competed in a round-robin tournament, where each team had to play against every other team. In 2006 two conferences were introduced: the Circuito Norte (North) and Circuito Sur (South), of 4 teams each. In 2010, with the league changing name to Liga Nacional de Baloncesto, the Sur conference was renamed Sureste (Southeast). In 2018, with the folding of Huracanes del Atlántico, the North conference included only 3 teams. In 2019 the team number was reduced to 6, and the league reintroduced the round-robin tournament, eliminating the conference system.

=== Playoffs ===
In 2005, the first 4 teams at the end of the regular season qualified for the playoffs. With the introduction of two conferences (Circuitos) in 2006, the first 3 teams of each conference qualified for the playoffs. In 2011 this was changed, as only the first 2 teams qualified for the playoffs, thus eliminating the first round of the playoffs. The first two teams of each conference faced each other in the playoffs semifinals, and the championship game was played between the winners of the semifinal series. In 2016, the first 3 teams of each conference qualified for a further postseason round robin tournament, the winners of which qualified for the championship game. This was eliminated in 2018, with the folding of Huracanes del Atlántico, and the league resumed the original playoff format, reintroducing the semifinals.

== List of champions ==
Season	Champion	Series	Runner-up
2005	Reales de La Vega	4–2	Panteras del Distrito Nacional
2006	Metros de Santiago	4–3	Constituyentes de San Cristóbal
2007	Metros de Santiago	4–2	Panteras del Distrito Nacional
2008	Constituyentes de San Cristóbal	4–2	Reales de La Vega
2009	No league held		
2010	Cañeros del Este	4–1	Tiburones de Puerto Plata
2011	Leones de Santo Domingo	4–2	Cocolos de San Pedro de Macorís
2012	Cañeros del Este	4–2	Indios de San Francisco de Macorís
2013	Indios de San Francisco de Macorís	4–3	Titanes del Licey
2014	Metros de Santiago	4–2	Titanes del Distrito Nacional
2015	Metros de Santiago	4–3	Cañeros del Este
2016	Leones de Santo Domingo	4–3	Metros de Santiago
2017	Metros de Santiago	4–1	Leones de Santo Domingo
2018	Reales de La Vega	4–2	Cañeros del Este
2019	Indios de San Francisco de Macorís	4–2	Metros de Santiago
2020	No league held		
2021	Leones de Santo Domingo	4–2	Titanes del Distrito Nacional
2022	Leones de Santo Domingo	4–3	Indios de San Francisco de Macorís
2023	Reales de La Vega	4–3	Titanes del Distrito
2024	Titanes del Distrito	4–0	Reales de La Vega
2025	Titanes del Distrito	4–0	Metros de Santiago
2026	Gigantes de San Francisco	4–2	Metros de Santiago

== Championships ==
Team	Championships	Runner-up	Year(s) won
Metros de Santiago	5	2	2006, 2007, 2014, 2015, 2017
Leones de Santo Domingo	4	3	2011, 2016, 2021, 2022
Gigantes de San Francisco	3	2	2013, 2019, 2026
Reales de La Vega	3	2	2005, 2018, 2023
Titanes del Distrito Nacional	3	3	2008, 2024, 2025
Cañeros del Este	2	2	2010, 2012
Huracanes del Atlántico	0	1	
Soles de Santo Domingo Este	0	1	

== Awards ==
=== Most Valuable Player ===
Year	Winner	Team	Ref.
2005	(United States) Ed Elisma	Marineros de Puerto Plata	
2006	(Dominican Republic) Alexis Montas	Cañeros de La Romana	
2007	(Dominican Republic) Juan Araujo	Panteras del Distrito Nacional	
2008	(Dominican Republic) Richard Ortega	Indios de San Francisco de Macorís	
2009	No league held		
2010	Norte: (United States) Tyron Thomas	Indios de San Francisco de Macorís	
2010	Sureste: (United States) Maurice Carter	Cañeros de La Romana	
2011	Norte: (Dominican Republic) Juan Coronado	Reales de La Vega	
2011	Sureste: (United States) Eddie Basden	Cocolos de San Pedro de Macorís	
2012	(United States) Robert Glenn	Indios de San Francisco de Macorís	
2013	(United States) Gary Flowers	Titanes del Licey	
2014	(Dominican Republic) Gerardo Suero	Titanes del Distrito Nacional	
2015	(United States) Reyshawn Terry	Cañeros del Este	
2016	(United States) Robert Glenn (2×)	Metros de Santiago	
2017	(Dominican Republic) Gerardo Suero (2×)	Indios de San Francisco de Macorís	
2018	(Dominican Republic) Gerardo Suero (3×)	Indios de San Francisco de Macorís	
2019	(United States) Paris Bass	Indios de San Francisco de Macorís	
2021	(Dominican Republic) Jeison Colomé	Cañeros del Este	
2022	(Dominican Republic) Juan Miguel Suero	Indios de San Francisco de Macorís	
2023	(Dominican Republic) Gelvis Solano	Reales de La Vega	
2024	(Dominican Republic) Richard Bautista	Titanes del Licey	
2025	(Dominican Republic) Juan Guerrero	Metros de Santiago	
2026	(Dominican Republic) Luismal Ferreiras	Gigantes de San Francisco	

=== Finals MVP ===
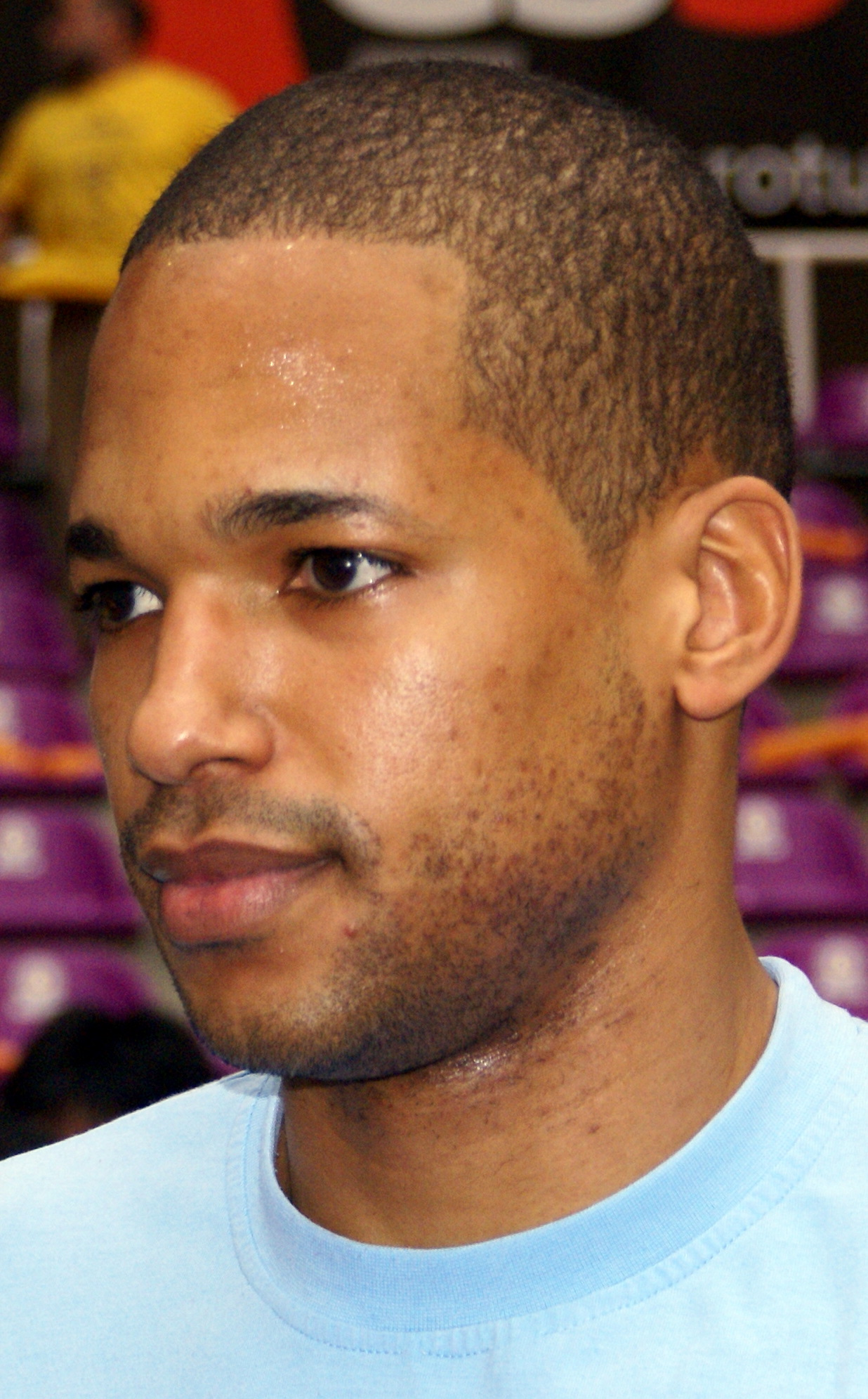
Eulis Báez pictured in 2011, the year he won the Finals MVP award

Year	Winner	Team	Ref.
2005	(Dominican Republic) Jorge Almanzar	Reales de La Vega	
2006	(Puerto Rico) Carmelo Lee	Metros de Santiago	
2007	(Dominican Republic) Amaury Filion	Metros de Santiago	
2008	(United States) Ed Elisma	Constituyentes de San Cristóbal	
2009	No league held		
2010	(Dominican Republic) Edward Santana	Cañeros de La Romana	
2011	(Dominican Republic) Eulis Báez	Leones de Santo Domingo	
2012	(United States) Mario West	Cañeros del Este	
2013	(United States) Robert Glenn	Indios de San Francisco de Macorís	
2014	(Dominican Republic) Víctor Liz	Metros de Santiago	
2015	(Dominican Republic) Víctor Liz (2×)	Metros de Santiago	
2016	(Dominican Republic) Manuel Fortuna	Leones de Santo Domingo	
2017	(United States) Robert Glenn (2×)	Metro de Santiago	
2018	(United States) Gerard DeVaughn	Reales de La Vega	
2019	(United States) Paris Bass	Indios de San Francisco de Macorís	
2025	(Dominican Republic) Jassel Pérez	Titanes del Sur	
2026	(United States) Charlie Brown Jr.	Gigantes de San Francisco	

== Statistical leaders ==
=== Scoring ===
Year	Player	Team	PPG	Ref.
2005	(United States) Rogers Washington	Cocolos de San Pedro de Macorís	24.6	
2006	(United States) Reggie Charles	Cocolos de San Pedro de Macorís	21.5	
2007	(United States) Jamaal Thomas	Marineros de Puerto Plata	20.6	
2008	(Dominican Republic) Juan Araujo	Panteras del Distrito Nacional	20.7	
2009	No league held			
2010	(United States) Tyron Thomas	Indios de San Francisco de Macorís	23.9	
2011	(Dominican Republic) Juan Coronado	Reales de La Vega	21.3	
2012	(United States) Ollie Bailey	Cocolos de San Pedro de Macorís	24.4	
2013	(United States) Ollie Bailey (2×)	Cocolos de San Pedro de Macorís	20.1	
2014	(Dominican Republic) Gerardo Suero	Titanes del Distrito Nacional	25.2	
2015	(Dominican Republic) Rigoberto Mendoza	Reales de La Vega	23.9	
2016	(Dominican Republic) Víctor Liz	Metros de Santiago	22.4	
2017	(Dominican Republic) Gerardo Suero (2×)	Indios de San Francisco de Macorís	27.5	
2018	(Dominican Republic) Gerardo Suero (3×)	Indios de San Francisco de Macorís	25.6	
2019	(United States) Paris Bass	Indios de San Francisco de Macorís	21.7	

=== Rebounds ===
Year	Player	Team	RPG	Ref.
2005	(Dominican Republic) Edward Santana	Cañeros de La Romana	11.4	
2006	(Dominican Republic) Alexis Montas	Cañeros de La Romana	10.7	
2007	(United States) John Jackson	Cocolos de San Pedro de Macorís	10.5	
2008	(United States) Ed Elisma	Constituyentes de San Cristóbal	10.8	
2009	No league held			
2010	(United States) Ed Elisma (2×)	Indios de San Francisco de Macorís	12.6	
2011	(Dominican Republic) Alexis Montas (2×)	Cañeros del Este	13.1	
2012	(Dominican Republic) Jack Michael Martínez	Cocolos de San Pedro de Macorís	11.7	
2013	(United States) James Thomas	Titanes del Licey	12.9	
2014	(United States) Walter Sharpe	Reales de La Vega	10.5	
2015	(United States) Dwayne Jones	Leones de Santo Domingo	15.4	
2016	(Dominican Republic) Jonathan Araujo	Indios de San Francisco de Macorís	10.9	
2017	(Dominican Republic) Jonathan Araujo (2×)	Leones de Santo Domingo	10.6	
2018	(Dominican Republic) Jonathan Araujo (3×)	Cañeros del Este	11.6	
2019	(Dominican Republic) Eloy Vargas	Metros de Santiago	12.1	

=== Assists ===
Year	Player	Team	APG	Ref.
2005	(Dominican Republic) José Fortuna	Constituyentes de San Cristóbal	5.4	
2006	(Dominican Republic) José Fortuna (2×)	Constituyentes de San Cristóbal	5.5	
2007	(Dominican Republic) Richard Ortega	Indios de San Francisco de Macorís	5.2	
2008	(Dominican Republic) Richard Ortega (2×)	Indios de San Francisco de Macorís	8.4	
2009	No league held			
2010	(Dominican Republic) Richard Ortega (3×)	Indios de San Francisco de Macorís	4.6	
2011	(Puerto Rico) Christian Dalmau	Titanes del Distrito Nacional	6.3	
2012	(Dominican Republic) Kelvin Peña	Huracanes del Atlántico	5.5	
2013	(United States) Walker Russell Jr.	Leones de Santo Domingo	3.9	
2014	(United States) Mario Little	Cañeros del Este	3.8	
2015	(United States) Ronnie Taylor	Soles de Santo Domingo Este	5.0	
2016	(Dominican Republic) Danilo Núñez	Soles de Santo Domingo Este	5.2	
2017	(Dominican Republic) Juan Coronado	Reales de La Vega	6.5	
2018	(Dominican Republic) Juan Miguel Suero	Indios de San Francisco de Macorís	5.8	
2019	(Dominican Republic) Adris De León	Metros de Santiago	5.5	

=== Steals ===
Year	Player	Team	SPG	Ref.
2005	(Dominican Republic) Edward Santana	Cañeros de La Romana	3.8	
2006	Data not available			
2007	Data not available			
2008	(Dominican Republic) Richard Ortega	Indios de San Francisco de Macorís	2.7	
2009	No league held			
2010	(Dominican Republic) Juan Coronado	Reales de La Vega	2.4	
2011	(Dominican Republic) Juan Coronado (2×)	Reales de La Vega	2.3	
2012	(United States) Darius Adams	Reales de La Vega	3.8	
2013	(Dominican Republic) Víctor Liz	Metros de Santiago	1.9	
2014	(United States) Walter Sharpe	Reales de La Vega	2.7	
2015	(Dominican Republic) José Acosta	Reales de La Vega	3.0	
2016	(Dominican Republic) Víctor Liz (2×)	Metros de Santiago	2.5	
2017	(Dominican Republic) Juan Miguel Suero	Indios de San Francisco de Macorís	2.2	
2018	(Dominican Republic) Jaison Valdez	Soles de Santo Domingo Este	2.6	
2019	(Dominican Republic) Jaison Colomé	Cañeros del Este	2.1	

=== Blocks ===
Year	Player	Team	BPG	Ref.
2005	(Dominican Republic) Edward Santana	Cañeros de La Romana	4.5	
2006	Data not available			
2007	Data not available			
2008	(United States) Ed Elisma	Constituyentes de San Cristóbal	1.4	
2009	No league held			
2010	(United States) Ed Elisma (2×)	Indios de San Francisco de Macorís	2.2	
2011	(United States) Scott VanderMeer	Leones de Santo Domingo	3.4	
2012	(British Virgin Islands) Kleon Penn	Huracanes del Atlántico	3.3	
2013	(Nigeria) Augustine Okosun	Reales de La Vega	2.8	
2014	(United States) Walter Sharpe	Reales de La Vega	2.5	
2015	(United States) Willie Reed	Metros de Santiago	2.1	
2016	(United States) Jordan Richard	Soles de Santo Domingo Este	3.9	
2017	(Dominican Republic) Ángel Núñez	Metros de Santiago	1.5	
2018	(United States) Darian Townes	Reales de La Vega	2.1	
2019	(United States) Branden Dawson	Cañeros del Este	2.5	

== Individual records ==
=== Game ===
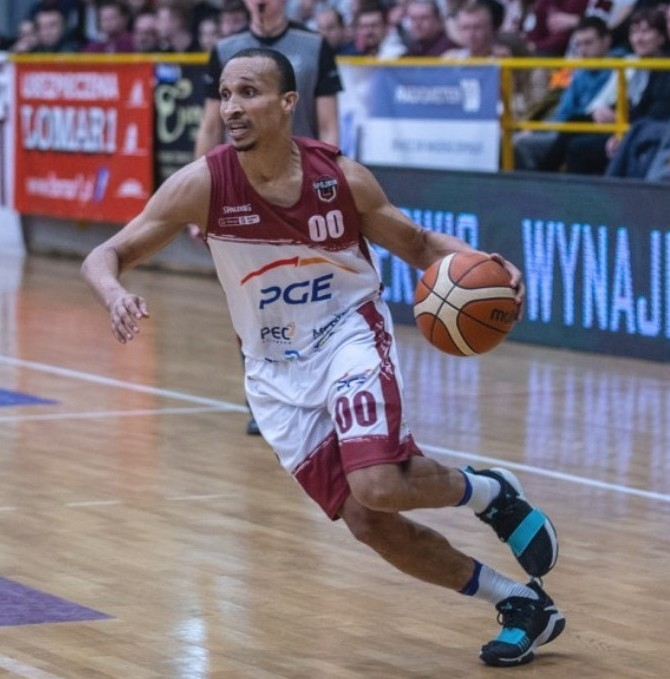
Adris De León established the record for most points in a game (54) and tied the record for most three-pointers made in a game (11) on August 11, 2016

- Most points in a game

- 54 by Adris De León, Metros de Santiago (vs. Huracanes del Atlántico) on August 11, 2016

- Most rebounds in a game

- 27 by Jack Michael Martínez, Cocolos de San Pedro de Macorís (vs. Cañeros de La Romana) on August 31, 2007

- Most assists in a game

- 15 by Richard Ortega, Indios de San Francisco de Macorís (vs. Cañeros de La Romana) on August 5, 2008
- 15 by Juan Coronado, Reales de La Vega (vs. Indios de San Francisco de Macorís) on July 9, 2017

- Most blocks in a game

- 11 by Scott VanderMeer, Leones de Santo Domingo (vs. Titanes del Distrito Nacional) on July 15, 2011

- Most 3-point field goals made in a game

- 11 by Courtney Nelson, Huracanes del Atlántico (vs. Metros de Santiago) on September 3, 2011 (11/20)
- 11 by Adris De León, Metros de Santiago (vs. Huracanes del Atlántico) on August 11, 2016 (11/23)

=== Season ===
- Most points in a season

- 523 by Gerardo Suero, Indios de San Francisco de Macorís in 2017

- Most rebounds in a season

- 261 by Alexis Montas, Cañeros del Este in 2011

- Most assists in a season

- 159 by Richard Ortega, Indios de San Francisco de Macorís in 2008

- Most steals in a season

- 67 by Carlos Wheeler, Panteras del Distrito Nacional in 2005

- Most blocks in a season

- 76 by Edward Santana, Cañeros de La Romana in 2005
