= Arena Banreservas Virgilio Travieso Soto =

Multi-purpose arena in Santo Domingo, Dominican Republic

- La Media Naranja (The Half Orange)
- Interactive map of Arena Banreservas Virgilio Travieso Soto
- Full name: Arena Banreservas Profesor Virgilio Travieso Soto
- Former names: Palacio de los Deportes Virgilio Travieso Soto (1987-2026)
- Location: Centro Olímpico Juan Pablo Duarte, Santo Domingo, Distrito Nacional, 10122, Dominican Republic
- Coordinates: 18.474935°N 69.918789°W
- Elevation: 55 m (180 ft)
- Owner: Dominican state
- Operator: Arena Banreservas management committee
- Seating type: reserved seating
- Capacity: 8,270; 7,400 (Concerts)
- Executive suites: 7
- Type: Stadium
- Roof: domed
- Surface: Parquet Floor
- Scoreboard: Central Main LED HD video board 4 sides Second floor fascia 360° LED Ribbon Board; LED video boards
- Screen: 2
- Height: 37 m (121 ft)
- Field shape: elliptical
- Parking: Yes

Construction
- Opened: 17 February 1974
- Renovated: 24 June 2026
- Cost: RD$3.454 million; Renovation (1998): RD$25 million; Renovation (2010): RD$9 million; Renovation (2019): RD$60 million; Renovation (2026): RD$1,000 million
- General contractor: CONT-CIP

Tenants
- Dominican Republic men's national basketball team Leones de Santo Domingo (LNB); Titanes del Distrito (LNB)

Arena Banreservas Virgilio Travieso Soto is a multi-purpose indoor arena located on Centro Olímpico Juan Pablo Duarte in Santo Domingo, Dominican Republic. Was built in 1974 for the 1974 Central American and Caribbean Games and is operated by the Arena Banreservas management committee.Since 2026,the arena is sponsored by the Bank of Reserves of the Dominican Republic following a long-term right name rights deal with the management committee.

This venue hosts local sporting events and concerts, having held the basketball games during the 2003 Pan American Games and the 2010 World Youth Women's Handball Championship. It is known as The Half Orange (Spanish: La Media Naranja) for its characteristic domed orange roof.

== Description ==
It houses the Baskeball National Federation, the National League, Special Olympics office, National District Basketball Association, two gyms and storage facilities.

== History ==
=== 1974 ===
The Mexican Contratos de Obras y Agrícolas C. por A., CONTROBAS and Dominican Construcciones y Pavimentos S.A. were in charge of the design and construction of the Arena. The cost on the opening day of the Arena, 17 February 1974, was RD$ 3,454,178.00. The three levels building is circular in the outside and elliptical in the inside, with a total height of 37 meters and 106 meters wide. The domed shape roof is from reinforced concrete, metal framed and wood with orange waterproof resin cover, giving the look of a half orange. The playing area is 700 m2 made of parquet floor.

The Palacio de los Deportes, served as the venue for the basketball competitions and volleyball finals for 1974 Central American and Caribbean Games.

=== 1979-1998 ===
The venue was recovered after the damage caused by Category 5 Hurricane David that made landfall in Santo Domingo on 31 August 1979 and harmed the roof, but its strong structure survived and was able to host displaced people.

Law 75-87 stated that the Palacio de los Deportes bears the name Virgilio Travieso Soto, former basketball player, delegate, technical director of the 1974 Central American and Caribbean Games and Dominican Sports Hall of Fame 1980 inductee.

It was remodeled for Centrobasket in 1987 and 1995, and a RD$25 million renovation in 1998 with Morrison Ingenieros which included roof repairs and fixing leaks, new seating and air conditioner. But on 22 September 1998, the Hurricane Georges damaged the recently repaired roof and the contractor reinstall it at its own expense, fulfilling the warranty.

=== 2002-2013 ===
In time for the 2002 NBA exhibition game game between Miami Heat and Minnesota Timberwolves on 11 October 2002, that included the local NBA player Felipe López from the Timberwolves; another important remodeling took place before the 2003 Pan American Games held in Santo Domingo. and the 2005 FIBA Americas Championship, a 2006 FIBA World Championship qualifier.

The government of the Dominican Republic spent 9 million on remodeling the venue before 2010 Centrobasket, but the air conditioning failed during the tournament one of the game was suspendended and the organizer had to rent mobile air conditionated units. The 2011 Liga Nacional de Baloncesto season had to be relocated to the Volleyball Pavilion due to the deplorable state of the facility, including the poor state of the bathrooms, lighting system and dressing rooms. But in early 2011, a government official revealed that there was a remodeling proposal that included the demolition of the stadium and the construction of a new one, similar to Gran Arena del Cibao. But later, a private RD$900 millions proposal for a multi purpose venue, similar to the Madison Square Garden whithout demolishing the existing building was delivered to the government for consideration. It included the improvement of the acoustic system and modification the roof. The Dominican Republic Baskeball Federation, Frank Herasme said that the 20 years service life of the Palacio de los Deportes ended and it can't handle any more remodeling. He complained about the lack of maintenaince and considered the venue to be dysfunctional and its structure to be outdated. But a new renovation was done in 2011 and in 2013 the president of the national federation, Rafael Uribe and men's team general manager Eduardo Najri agreed that the Palacio de los Deportes should be demolished in order to have a top-leve venue

=== 2017-2019 ===
The stadium still unusable when the 2017 National District Superior Basketball Tournament have to be moved again to the Volleyball Pavillion and Club San Carlos because of the terrible state of the stadium. The National District Basketball Association president, journalist José P. Monegro proposed that money from the Odebrecht case in the Dominican Republic should be used for the reconstruction of the multi-purpose indoor arena. The national federation president requested a modernization of the arena, at a time when the national team could not neither train nor play official matches at the Palacio de los Deportes.

A new renovation costing RD$40 million intended to turn the Palacio de los Deportes like new started in May 2019, including bringing back the orange color of the roof stained by mold, installation of surveillance cameras, new interior lighting, adding a new changing room and new flooring. This renewal, before the new season of the National District Basketball Superior Tournament, ended up costing RD$60 million.

=== 2022-2026 ===
The Palacio de los Deportes held 2022 FIBA Women's Basketball World Cup qualifying matches on 13 and 14 February 2022, when controversy sparked when Russia could not travel to the United States because the U.S. does not consider the Russian Sputnik V COVID-19 vaccine to meet its entry requirements and FIBA decided to relocate the games involving Russia to a bubble in the Dominican Republic, with Russia defeating Belgium and Puerto Rico and winning the berth to the World Cup. The 524-23 Luis Abinader presidential decree, named the Palacio de los Deportes management committee, is chaired by businessman Rafael Hasbún, and the members are Fernando Langa, businessman Eduardo Najri, former basketball player Alfred Cari Von Leschhorn Ariza (Aldo Leschhorn) and 2026 Central American and Caribbean Games organizing committee president José P. Monegro.

In 2024, Hasbún announced that an sponsorship agreement was reached with BanReservas, that would be in charge of the remodeling of the complex, including the first naming rights agreement ever held in the Dominican Republic that renamed the venue as Arena BanReservas. The renovation was necessary to host the basketball games of the 2026 Central American and Caribbean Games,

The RD$1,000 million renovation wrapped up in 2026, introducing a top-tier FIBA-certified basketball court with Level 1 hoops and professional broadcast lighting. Fans will enjoy an immersive experience thanks to a high-definition 360-degree central LED screen, perimeter displays, and a premium sound system. The venue also offers versatile fixed and retractable seating, plus fully accessible restrooms for individuals with disabilities. Included four modern locker rooms with individual lockers for the players, screens, and bathrooms with 14 showers. The domed roof and the exterior were restored, there is a modern press room; seven suites, including one for the press, a presidential and one VIP suite now featuring a new seating capacity of 8,270 spectators. It hosted qualification games for the 2027 FIBA World Cup after the new opening.

== Events and concerts ==
Band/Artist	Event/Tour	Date	Attendance
1974 Central American and Caribbean Games		1974	
The Producers		1983	Sold Out
Ramon Orlando	No Hay Nadie mas Tour	1991	
2003 Pan American Games		2003	
Chayanne		2003	
David Bisbal		2003	
Santo Domingo Reggaetón Festival 2003 (Note: The artists that performed in that concert were Don Omar, Falo, Plan B, Goldy, Felo Man, Baby Rasta y Gringo, Wizin y Janel, Michael y Manuel, Zion y Lennox, Eddi Dee, Glory y Voltio, Los correctos y Nipo.)		9 December 2003	6,000
Tego Calderon	El Abayarde World Tour	20 December 2003	8,000
Merengazo del Verano		2004	7,000
Daddy Yankee	Barrio Fino World Tour	23 October 2004	
Erreway		27 November 2004	
Sin Banderas		3 February 2005	10,000
Smackdown	Live Tour 2006	30 June 2006	
Ricardo Arjona	Adentro Tour	27 July 2006	
Paulina Rubio	Amor, Luz y Sonido Tour	29 March 2007	5,000
Jesus Andrian Romero		9 December 2007	
Chayanne		15 December 2007	
Alejandro Sanz		9 February 2008	10,000
RBD	Tour Emepezar desde cero 2008	11 April 2008	
Victor Manuel, Elvis Crespo, Los Rosario & Zone D`Tambora	Una Noche Tropical	7 June 2008	
Disney's High School Musical the Ice Tour		3–6 July 2008	
Don Omar	Up & Closer	23 February 2008	
Cristian Castro & Gibeltoo Santa Rosa	`Encuentro de dos grandes	23 August 2008	
Alejandro Fernandez	Viento a Favor tour	30 August 2008	10,000
Juanes	La Vida World Tour	15 November 2008	
Danilo Monterio & Julissa	Inagotable	21 November 2008	
Daddy Yankee	The Big Boss World Tour	18 December 2008	8,000
Marco Barrientos	Aviva Tour	28 March 2009	4,500
Lilly Goodman, Daniel Calveti & Tercer Cielo	3x1	30 May 2009	8,000
Luis Fonsi	Palabras del Siliencio Tour	8 August 2009	
Disney on ice El viaje Fantastico		20–23 August 2009	
Laura Pausini	Primavera Anticipada World Tour	19 September 2009	
Pet Shop Boys	Pandemonium Tour	24 October 2009	
Julio Iglesias		5 November 2009	
Martha Heredia		20 December 2009	
Chichi Peralta	De Aquel Lado del Rio	9 February 2010	
Cristian Castro, Martha Heredia, Reik & Noel	Invasion Pop	6 March 2010	
Joaquin Sabina	Tour Viña y rosas 2010	18 May 2010	
Raymond Pozo & Miguel Cespedes	Tour 16	24 July 2010	
Jonas Brothers	Live in Concert	16 October 2010	
David Bisbal	Sin mirar atras tour	23 October 2010	
Cosculluela	Cosculluela Concert Party	27 November 2010	
Camlia	Dejate Amar Tour	5 March 2011	
Laura Pausini	Inedito World Tour	12 February 2012	4,000
Joaquin Sabina & Joan Manuel Serrat	Dos Pajaros Contraatacan	7 November 2012	
Cirque du Soleil	Saltimbaco	22–25 November 2012	
Raymond Pozo & Miguel Cepedes	Reyes del Humor	27 December 2012	
Ruben Blades	Cuentos y Cantos Urbanos	16 December 2013	3,000
Andres Cepeda	Lo mejor que hay en mi vida World Tour	7 June 2014	
Chayanne	En todo estare World Tour	2 May 2015	
Ricardo Arjona	Viajer Tour	22, 23 & 29 August 2015	
Camila	Elypse World Tour	5 December 2015	
Sin Bandera	Una Ultima Vez World Tour	6 April 2016	
Alejandro Sanz	Sirope Tour 2016	21 May 2016	
Chayanne	En Todo Estare World Tour 2016	18 June 2016	
Nicky Jam	The Ave Fenix Tour	14 August 2016	6,000 / 6,700
Camila + Ricardo Montaner		24 September 2016	
Cirque du Soleil	Ovo	27–30 October 2016	
Ricardo Montaner + Sin Bandera	Solo hits & Por Ultima Vez	18 & 19 March 2017	
Miguel Bose	Estare 2017	4 May 2017	
Franco de Vita & Camila	Solo hits Tour 2017	3 June 2017	
Ingrid Rosario		27 July 2017	
Il Voto	Notte Magica: A Tribute To The Three Tenors	13 September 2017	
Prince Royce, Mozart La Para, Ilegales	Quiereme Como Soy	17 February 2018	
Ozuna	Odisea World Tour	23 June 2018	11,000 (record)
Maluma	F.A.M.E Tour	15 August 2018	
El Alfa	10 años	2 September 2018	8,000+
Toño Rosario & Los Hermanos Rosario	La Disnatia Rosario	6 October 2018	6,000+
Jesus Adrian Romero	Tour 2018	20 October 2018	
Zion & Lennox		26 October 2018	
Ha Ash	100 años tour	27 October 2018	
Camila & Sin Banderas	4 Latidos Tour	8 March 2019	
Chayanne	Desde el alma Tour 2019	25 May 2019	
J Balvin	Arcoiris Tour	31 August 2019	
Raymond & Miguel	Los Reyes Pa’l Palacio	14 September 2019	7,000+
Gabriel	Morisoñando Tour	19 October 2019	
Ricardo Montaner	Montaner Tour 2019	15 December 2019	8,000
Camila and Sin Bandera	4 Latidos Tour	19 February 2022	
Myke Towers	El Young King The Tour 2022.	12 March 2022	
Carlos Vives	Vives Tour	14 May 2022	
Reik and Luis Fonsi	En Cambio Tour y Noche Perfecta Tour	23 July 2022	9,000+
Marco Antonio Solis	Que Ganas de Verte Tour	30 September & 1 October 2022	
Dj Adonis	Dj Adonis y sus amigos	17 December 2022	
Manny Cruz	Dominicano de Corazón	4 March 2023	
Ana Gabriel	Por Amor A Ustedes World Tour	29, 30 April and 3 May	Sold Out
Rochy RD		12 August 2023	
Eladio Carrion	The Sauce Latam Tour	1, 2 & 3 December 2023	

== Notes ==
Preceded by Winnipeg Arena; Winnipeg	Pan American Games Basketball Tournament; Venue; 2003	Succeeded by Olympic Arena; Rio de Janeiro
