= Carlos Morban =

Dominican Republic basketball player

Personal information
- Born: 25 April 1982 (age 44) Santo Domingo, Dominican Republic
- Listed height: 6 ft 2 in (1.88 m)
- Listed weight: 190 lb (86 kg)

Career information
- High school: Miami Christian (Miami, Florida)
- College: FIU (2001–2004)
- NBA draft: 2004: undrafted
- Playing career: 2004–2016
- Position: Guard

Career history
- 2004–2005: PBC CSKA Sofia
- 2005–2006: Erdemirspor
- 2006: Cocolos de San Pedro de Macorís
- 2006: Marineros de Puerto Plata
- 2006–2007: Feni Industries
- 2007: Vardar
- 2007–2008: CS Dinamo București
- 2008: Marineros de Puerto Plata
- 2008: Vardar
- 2008–2009: HKK Široki
- 2009: KB Peja
- 2009: San Lazaro
- 2009: Lobos Grises UAD
- 2009: La Mattica
- 2010: San Lazaro
- 2010: Tiburones de Puerto Plata
- 2010–2011: Lirija
- 2011: Huracanes del Atlántico
- 2010–2012: Lirija
- 2012: Huracanes del Atlántico
- 2012–2013: Lirija
- 2013: Huellas del Siglo
- 2013–2014: Huracanes del Atlántico
- 2015: Metros de Santiago

Career highlights
- Macedonian Basketball Cup winner (2007)
Medals
Representing the Dominican Republic
Men's basketball
Pan American Games
Silver medal – second place	2003 Santo Domingo
Centrobasket
Bronze medal – third place	2008 Cancun
Silver medal – second place	2010 Santo Domingo
FIBA CBC Championship
Silver medal – second place	2007 Caguas

Carlos Alberto Morban Rivera (born 25 April 1982 in Santo Domingo) is a former professional basketball player from the Dominican Republic. He is a 6 ft 2 in (1.88 m) and 190 lb (93 kg) guard who played for teams in Venezuela, Mexico, Croatia, and Romania.

== High school ==
In 2000, Carlos Morban led Miami Christian School to a state championship.

== College career ==
Morban was a three-year starter at Florida International University. In 80 games over three seasons, he averaged 9.8 points, 3.5 rebounds, 2.8 assists, and 2.5 steals per game. His best season was his junior year (2003–04), when he averaged 12 points per game for the Golden Panthers. He left after his junior season to begin his professional career.

== Professional career ==
Morban was not drafted to the NBA and began his career with PBC CSKA Sofia in the Bulgarian National Basketball League. Since then, Morban has played professionally in Turkey, Macedonia, Romania, the Dominican Republic, and Mexico. He played for PBC CSKA Sofia and Bosnian team HKK Široki in the EuroChallenge, in 2005 and 2008, respectively. He currently plays for Lobos Grises UAD in the Mexican Liga Nacional de Baloncesto Profesional.

== National team career ==
Morban also plays internationally for the Dominican Republic national basketball team. He first played for the senior team at the 2007 CBC Championship, helping the Dominicans to the silver medal and automatic qualification to 2008 Centrobasket. At the Centrobasket tournament, he helped the Dominicans to a bronze medal to qualify for the FIBA Americas Championship 2009, where he again played for the team. He previously played for the fourth place Dominican team at the 2001 FIBA World Championship for Young Men.
