= Orlando Sánchez (basketball) =

Dominican basketball player

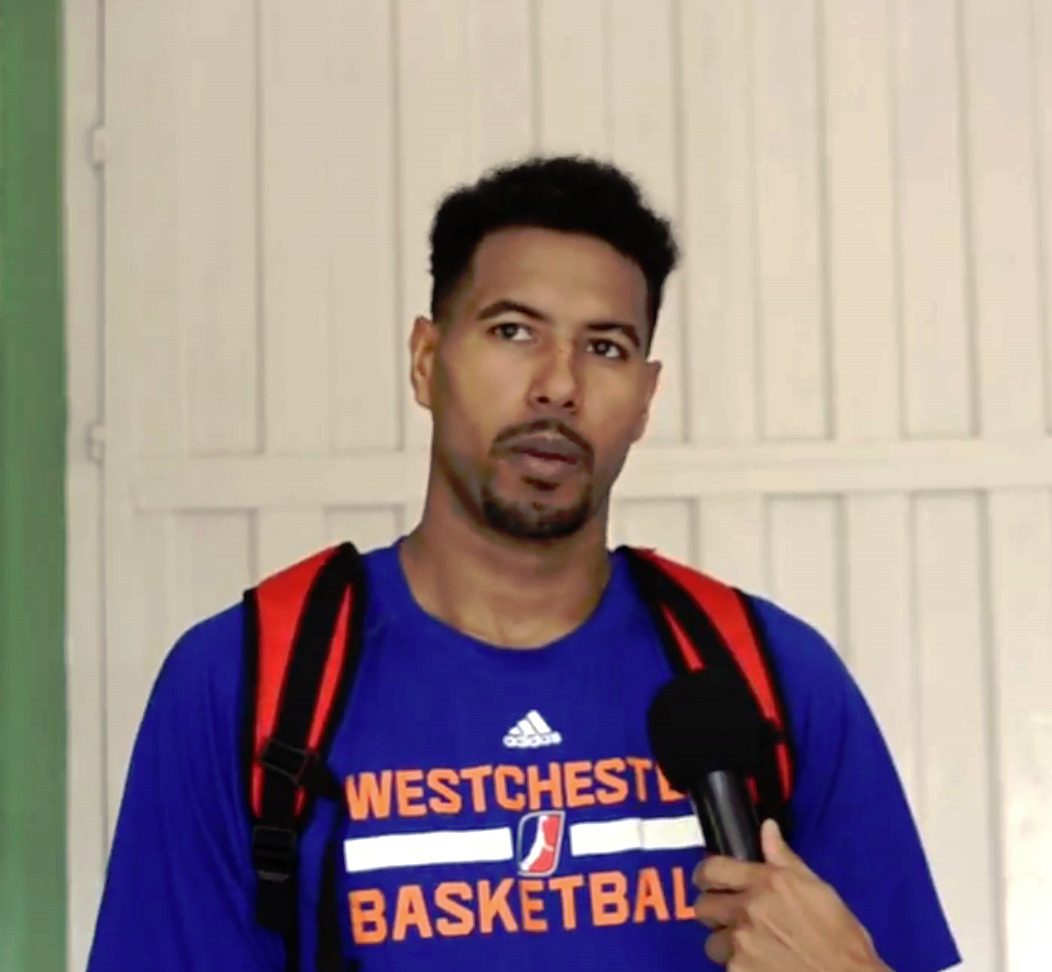

Personal information
- Born: May 26, 1988 (age 38) Nagua, Dominican Republic
- Listed height: 6 ft 9 in (2.06 m)
- Listed weight: 232 lb (105 kg)

Career information
- High school: Colegio Nueva Luz (Nagua, Dominican Republic)
- College: Monroe College (2010–2012); St. John's (2013–2014)
- NBA draft: 2014: undrafted
- Playing career: 2008–2023
- Position: Power forward

Career history
- 2008–2009: Ferrallas Los Llanos Hellín
- 2009: San Lázaro
- 2014–2015: Westchester Knicks
- 2015: Metros de Santiago
- 2016–2018: Bucaneros de La Guaira
- 2018–2019: Cañeros del Este
- 2019-2020: Shinshu Brave Warriors
- 2020-2021: Aomori Wat's
- 2021-2022: Yamagata Wyverns

Career highlights
- District National Rookie of the Year (2009); LNB Rookie of the Year (2015)
- Stats at Basketball Reference

Orlando Emilio Sánchez Caminero (born May 26, 1988) is a Dominican professional basketball player for Bucaneros de La Guaira of the Venezuelan Liga Profesional de Baloncesto (LPB). He played college basketball for Monroe College and St. John's University, and has represented the Dominican Republic in international competition.

== Early life ==
As a young child, Sánchez moved in with his grandparents after his parents were unable to take care of him due to financial difficulties. Although they weren't well off by any means (his grandmother had various health problems that prevented her from working), they were more comfortable and able to care of him. After his grandfather died in 1998, Sánchez and his grandmother, Sabrina Vargas, got by on the money he left them until that eventually ran out. It was around this time that his father suggested he come work for him as an apprentice carpenter in Spain. So at age 17, Sánchez dropped out of high school, went to work in Spain and sent what money he could back to his grandmother.

Sánchez spent three years working in Spain, including one in another town without his father after the two had a falling-out. It was during this time that Sánchez first started playing basketball. In 2008–09, he played 28 games for Ferrallas Los Llanos Hellín of the Liga EBA, before moving back to the Dominican Republic in 2009 where he played eight games for San Lazaro of the Dominican District National league, and subsequently won the District National Rookie of the Year award. That same year, at age 21, he finally graduated from high school, and in 2010, he made his Dominican national team debut.

== College career ==
Sánchez then enrolled at Monroe College where as a freshman in 2010–11, he earned honorable mention JUCO All-American honors after averaging 8.5 points, 11.5 rebounds (ranked seventh in the nation) and 4.3 blocks per game (ranked third among all junior college players). His efforts led the Mustangs to a 31–5 record, the NJCAA Region 15 title, the District III championship and a best-ever third-place finish in the 2011 NJCAA National Championship in Hutchinson, Kansas. Following the season, he played on the Dominican national team that was coached by Kentucky's John Calipari.

As a sophomore in 2011–12, Sánchez led Monroe to a fifth-place national finish and earned All-NJCAA all-tournament honors and garnered second team NJCAA Region 15 all-star accolades after averaging 10.2 points, 8.0 rebounds, 2.0 assists and 1.9 blocks per game. In April 2012, he graduated from Monroe with an associate degree in business administration. Later that month, he signed a National Letter of Intent to play college basketball for St. John's University.

In November 2012, Sánchez was deemed ineligible to play by the NCAA after the organization determined that, at age 24, he had used up his four years of eligibility. On February 28, 2013, he was granted a waiver based on hardship, allowing him to play for St. John's in 2013–14. After sitting out the entire 2012–13 season, Sánchez made his debut for St. John's on November 8, 2013, scoring five points in a 75–86 loss to Wisconsin. In 32 games (18 starts) for the Red Storm in 2013–14, Sánchez averaged 7.4 points, 5.6 rebounds, 1.4 steals and 1.1 blocks in 22.3 minutes per game. Following the season, he graduated from St. John's with a bachelor's degree in sport management.

== Professional career ==
=== 2014–15 season ===
Sánchez went undrafted in the 2014 NBA draft. On September 17, 2014, he signed with the New York Knicks. However, he was later waived by the Knicks on October 24, 2014, after appearing in one preseason game. On November 3, 2014, he was acquired by the Westchester Knicks of the NBA Development League as an affiliate player. Sánchez played 33 games for Westchester before leaving the team in late February. He returned to the Dominican Republic and signed with Metros de Santiago in March for the 2015 LNB season. In 29 games for Metros, he averaged 10.7 points, 5.0 rebounds, 1.5 assists and 1.4 steals per game.

=== 2015–16 season ===
On December 9, 2015, Sánchez signed with Bucaneros de La Guaira for the 2016 LPB season.

== National team career ==
Sánchez was a member of the Dominican national team that competed in the 2014 FIBA Basketball World Cup. In six games, he averaged 2.2 points and 2.5 rebounds per game.

== Personal ==
Sánchez is the son of Enhmin Patricia Caminero Martínez and Orlando E. Sánchez Vargas, and has three sisters, Jonaira, Yamile and Natasha; and one brother, Yauger. He and his wife, Flor Esthefani, gave birth to daughter Ysabel Angel on February 21, 2014.
