= Reyshawn Terry =

American basketball player (born 1984)

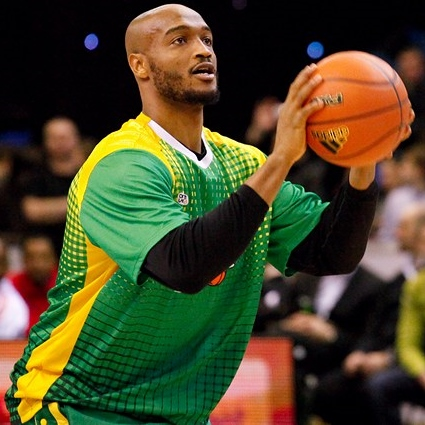
- Terry practices before the 2012 Ukrainian Basketball SuperLeague All-Star Game.

Personal information
- Born: April 7, 1984 (age 42) Winston-Salem, North Carolina, U.S.
- Listed height: 6 ft 8 in (2.03 m)
- Listed weight: 235 lb (107 kg)

Career information
- High school: R. J. Reynolds (Winston-Salem, North Carolina)
- College: North Carolina (2003–2007)
- NBA draft: 2007: 2nd round, 44th overall pick
- Drafted by: Orlando Magic
- Playing career: 2007–2023
- Position: Power forward / small forward

Career history
- 2007–2008: Aris Thessaloniki
- 2007–2008: Triboldi Soresina
- 2009: Virtus Bologna
- 2009–2010: Xacobeo Blu:Sens
- 2010–2011: Brose Baskets
- 2011–2012: Khimik Yuzhny
- 2012–2013: Champville
- 2013–2014: Le Mans
- 2014–2015: Tadamon Zouk
- 2015: Maratonistas de Coamo
- 2015: Trotamundos de Carabobo
- 2015: Cañeros del Este
- 2016: Al Mouttahed Tripoli
- 2016: Cañeros del Este
- 2016: Changwon LG Sakers
- 2016–2017: Ryukyu Golden Kings
- 2017–2018: Ulsan Mobis Phoebus
- 2018: Piratas de Quebradillas
- 2018–2019: Anyang KGC
- 2019: Piratas de Quebradillas
- 2019: Metros de Santiago
- 2019–2020: Mineros de Zacatecas
- 2020: Vaqueros de Bayamon
- 2021: Plateros de Fresnillo
- 2022: Quimsa
- 2022–2023: Universidad de Concepción
- 2023: Mineros de Zacatecas

Career highlights
- German League champion (2011); German Cup winner (2011); EuroChallenge champion (2009); BSN Most Valuable Player (2018); NCAA champion (2005); Third-team All-ACC (2006)
- Stats at Basketball Reference

Reyshawn Antonio Terry Sr. (born April 7, 1984) is an American former professional basketball player. He played college basketball for the North Carolina Tar Heels.

== College career ==
At the University of North Carolina at Chapel Hill, Terry played on the North Carolina Tar Heels men's basketball team and helped Carolina win the 2005 NCAA Championship as a sophomore. As a junior in 2005–06, Terry averaged a career high 14.3 points per game.

Terry graduated from UNC in May 2007 with a B.A. in African-American studies.

== Professional career ==
Terry was drafted in the second round, 44th overall, by the Orlando Magic in the 2007 NBA draft. He was traded on draft day by the Magic to the Mavericks for the rights to the 60th overall pick, Milovan Raković, and cash.

On August 26, 2007, he agreed to a contract with Aris BC of Greece's A1 league. In the summer of 2008, Terry played in the Rocky Mountain Revue summer league for the Dallas Mavericks, and then shortly after joined Italian club Virtus Bologna for the upcoming season. With Bologna, Terry reached the quarterfinals of the FIBA Euro Challenge.

In the 2009–10 Terry played for Xacobeo Blu:Sens, which was promoted to the Spanish ACB for the 2009–10 season, after having spent years in the second division LEB.

Terry played for the Portland Trail Blazers in the NBA Summer League in 2010.

In August 2010 he signed with German club Brose Baskets. For the following season, he signed with BC Khimik in Ukraine. The 2012–13 season he played for Champville SC in Lebanon.

In September 2013, he signed a one-year deal with Le Mans.

In October 2014, he signed with Tadamon Zouk of Lebanon. In March 2015, he left Tadamon and signed with Maratonistas de Coamo of Puerto Rico. In May 2015, he signed with Trotamundos de Carabobo of Venezuela for the rest of the 2015 LPB season. In June 2015, he signed with the Cañeros del Este of Dominican Republic for the 2015 LNB season.

On November 8, 2016, Terry signed with Japanese B.League club Ryukyu Golden Kings for the 2016–17 season.

On September 8, 2017, Terry signed with the Ulsan Mobis Phoebus of the Korean Basketball League.

On April 18, 2018, Terry signed with Piratas de Quebradillas of the Puerto Rican BSN. On August 28, 2018, Terry was named the BSN Most Valuable Player for the 2018 season.
