= Mario West =

American basketball player (born 1984)

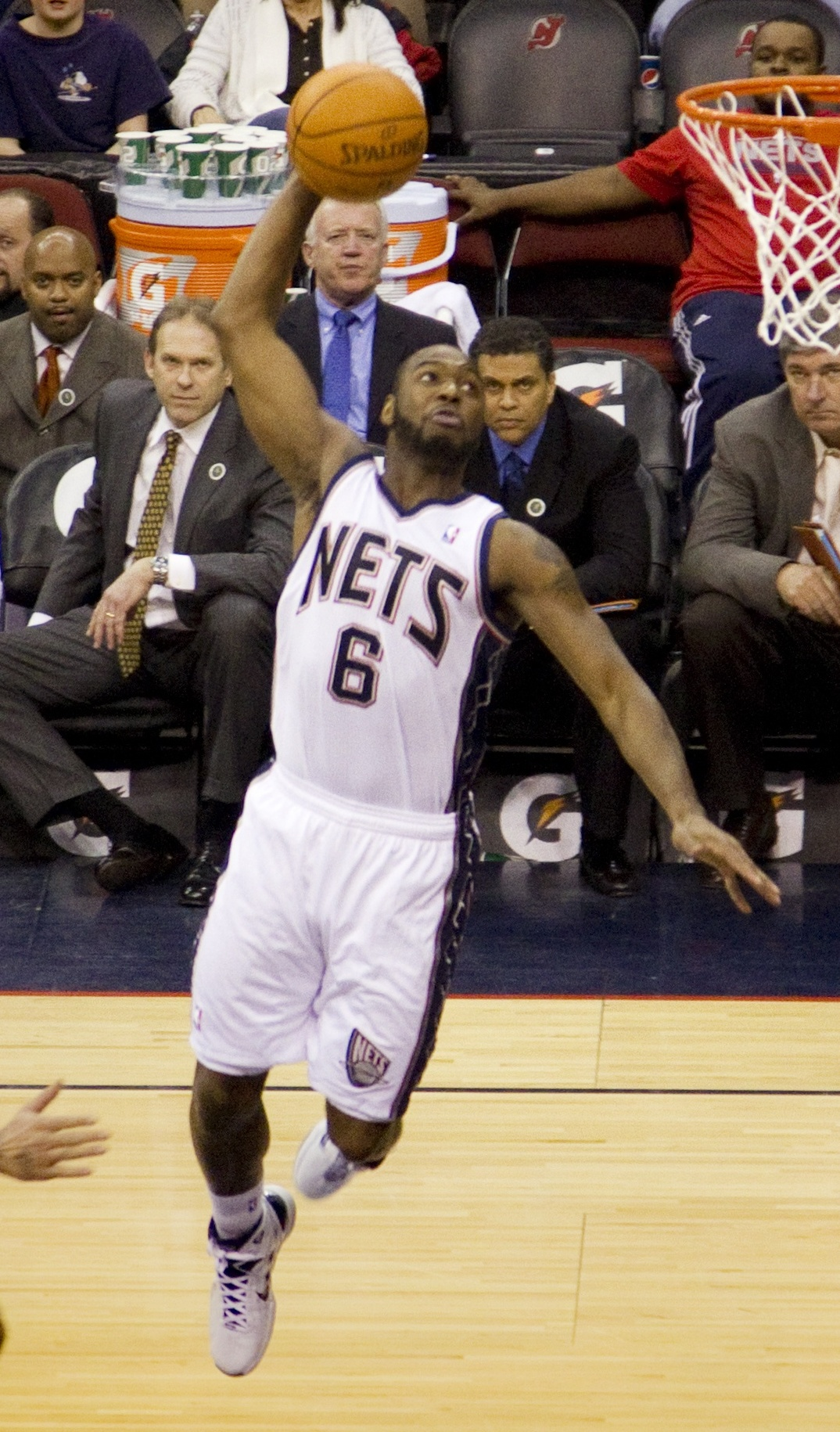

Personal information
- Born: June 19, 1984 (age 42) Huntsville, Alabama, U.S.
- Listed height: 6 ft 5 in (1.96 m)
- Listed weight: 210 lb (95 kg)

Career information
- High school: Douglas County (Douglasville, Georgia)
- College: Georgia Tech (2003–2007)
- NBA draft: 2007: undrafted
- Playing career: 2007–2015
- Position: Shooting guard
- Number: 6

Career history
- 2007–2009: Atlanta Hawks
- 2009–2010: Maine Red Claws
- 2010: Atlanta Hawks
- 2010–2011: Maine Red Claws
- 2011: New Jersey Nets
- 2011: Cocolos de San Pedro
- 2011–2012: Tezenis Verona
- 2012: Meralco Bolts
- 2012: Cañeros del Este
- 2012: La Villa
- 2013: Fuerza Regia
- 2013: Meralco Bolts
- 2013–2014: Fuerza Regia
- 2014: SO Maritime Boulogne
- 2014: Meralco Bolts
- 2014–2015: La Unión
- 2015: Juventud Sionista

Career highlights
- LNB champion (2012); LNB Finals MVP (2012)
- Stats at NBA.com
- Stats at Basketball Reference

Mario Marceé West (born June 19, 1984) is an American former professional basketball player who is currently the Director of Off the Court for the NBPA. He previously played in the NBA for the Atlanta Hawks and New Jersey Nets.

== High school and college career ==
West was a Douglas County player of the year as a senior at Douglas County High School. He also earned honorable mention all-state honors after averaging 22 points and 10 rebounds per game. West was team captain as a junior and senior.

West played college basketball for Georgia Tech. He joined the Tech squad as a walk-on in the fall of 2002, redshirted in 2002–03, and earned a scholarship for the 2003–04 season. He played in 103 games, averaging 3.2 points over his career, and 4.9 over his last two seasons. West departed Georgia Tech 16th on the school's all-time list for steals despite averaging only 13.9 minutes per game in four years. He was voted team captain during the 2006–07 season. West won the 2007 NCAA State Farm Slam Dunk Contest held during the tournament's Final Four week.

West received a Bachelor of Science degree in management from Georgia Tech on May 6, 2006, and continued his studies during his final college basketball season with courses in Economics.

== Professional career ==
West went undrafted in the 2007 NBA draft but was quickly signed by the Atlanta Hawks, a team he spent his first two seasons with. West spent the first half of the 2009–10 season playing in the NBA Development League for the Maine Red Claws, before re-joining the Hawks in January 2010. He remained with the Hawks for the rest of the season, and in 156 games for the team over three seasons, he averaged 0.8 points in 4.4 minutes per game.

West was known as a hard worker and an intense defender. Atlanta Hawks Head Coach Mike Woodson was quoted as saying "I've been around this league a long time and I don't think I've ever seen a guy play as hard as Mario plays. He pushes guys in practice to play hard and if you don't play hard he embarrasses you in terms of just knocking the hell out of you." Teammate Acie Law said "You can ask anybody in this locker room, Mario's the hardest worker on the team. You have to be at practice to see him. His motor never stops."

West re-joined the Maine Red Claws for the 2010–11 season, later signing with the New Jersey Nets in March 2011. He appeared in six games for the Nets to complete the 2010–11 season, averaging 3.7 points, 1.8 rebounds, 1.7 assists and 1.2 steals in 19.3 minutes per game.

In June 2011, West joined Cocolos de San Pedro de Macorís of the Liga Nacional de Baloncesto. His stint lasted until early August.

On August 2, 2011, West signed with Tezenis Verona of Italy for the 2011–12 season.

In June 2012, West moved to the Philippines where he joined the Meralco Bolts. In September 2012, he joined Cañeros del Este and helped them win the league championship while garnering Finals MVP honors in early October. Later that month, he joined La Villa for a short stint.

In January 2013, West signed with Fuerza Regia of Mexico for the rest of the 2012–13 season. In June 2013, he re-joined the Meralco Bolts. He then returned to Fuerza Regia for the 2013–14 season. In March 2014, he moved to France and signed with SO Maritime Boulogne. In May 2014, he returned the Meralco Bolts for a third stint.

In October 2014, West signed with La Unión of Argentina for the 2014–15 season. He sustained an injury in February 2015 and was ruled out for the rest of the season. He remained in Argentina for the 2015–16 season, signing with Juventud Sionista.

In May 2016, West returned to Georgia Tech in Atlanta when he was hired as the director of player personnel as part of head coach Josh Pastner's staff.

== NBA career statistics ==
Legend
GP	Games played	GS	Games started	MPG	Minutes per game
FG%	Field goal percentage	3P%	3-point field goal percentage	FT%	Free throw percentage
RPG	Rebounds per game	APG	Assists per game	SPG	Steals per game
BPG	Blocks per game	PPG	Points per game	**Bold**	Career high

=== Regular season ===
Year	Team	GP	GS	MPG	FG%	3P%	FT%	RPG	APG	SPG	BPG	PPG
2007–08	Atlanta	**64**	2	4.2	.429	.000	**.654**	.8	.2	.2	**.1**	.9
2008–09	Atlanta	53	**3**	5.1	.412	**1.000**	.467	1.1	.4	.3	**.1**	.8
2009–10	Atlanta	39	1	3.6	**.571**	.000	.600	.7	.2	.2	.0	.8
2010–11	New Jersey	6	**3**	**19.3**	.429	.250	.600	**1.8**	**1.7**	**1.2**	.0	**3.7**
Career		162	9	4.9	.448	.200	.563	.9	.3	.3	.0	1.0

=== Playoffs ===
Year	Team	GP	GS	MPG	FG%	3P%	FT%	RPG	APG	SPG	BPG	PPG
2008	Atlanta	6	0	1.0	.333	.000	.000	.3	.0	.0	.0	.3
2009	Atlanta	**11**	0	**4.2**	.200	.000	**.250**	**.5**	**.2**	**.2**	.0	.5
2010	Atlanta	7	0	2.9	**.750**	.000	.000	.3	.1	.1	.0	**.9**
Career		24	0	3.0	.353	.000	.200	.4	.1	.1	.0	.5

== Personal life ==
West is the son of Gerald and Angie West.

He has volunteered to work with patients at Egleston Children's Hospital in Atlanta since his college days in 2004. This includes activities such as hosting pizza parties for the children.

West co-authored a book "Defend the Dream" with his childhood friend Shakyna Bolden. He shares the lessons he learned in dealing with the challenges of life.
