= Jassel Pérez =

Dominican basketball player (born 2001)

- Pérez with Girona in 2026

No. 24 – Bàsquet Girona
- Position: Shooting guard
- League: Liga ACB; Europe Cup

Personal information
- Born: September 12, 2001 (age 25) San Cristóbal, Dominican Republic
- Listed height: 1.94 m (6 ft 4 in)
- Listed weight: 88 kg (194 lb)

Career information
- Playing career: 2021–present

Career history
- 2021–2022: Titanes del Sur
- 2022–2023: Mexico City Capitanes
- 2023: Spartans Distrito Capital
- 2023: Titanes del Sur
- 2023–2024: Real Estelí
- 2024: Spartans Distrito Capital
- 2024–2025: Titanes del Sur
- 2025: Spartans Distrito Capital
- 2025: Titanes del Sur
- 2025–2026: Granada
- 2025: →CD Estela
- 2026: Vaqueros de Bayamón
- 2026–present: Girona

Career highlights
- BSN champion (2026); 2x LNB Champion (2024, 2025); LNB Finals MVP (2025); LNB Rookie of the Year (2022); LNB Scoring Champion (2023)

Jassel Pérez (born September 12, 2001) is a Dominican professional basketball player who plays for Bàsquet Girona of the Liga ACB and the Europe Cup. Standing at 6 ft 4 in (1.93 m), Pérez plays as a shooting guard.

== Early life and youth career ==
Born in San Cristóbal, Dominican Republic, Pérez grew up playing both football and basketball and didn't focus on the latter sport until his late teens. He gravitated towards basketball due to most of his family members practicing the sport.

== Professional career ==
=== Titanes del Sur (2021–2022) ===
In 2021, Pérez started playing with Constituyentes de San Cristóbal, his hometown's team, in the Liga Nacional de Desarrollo. Constituyentes, also known as Titanes del Licey or Titanes del Distrito, would be the club with which Pérez started playing professionally in the Liga Nacional de Baloncesto. With Titanes, Pérez was selected rookie of the season for the 2021–22 Liga Nacional de Baloncesto.

=== Mexico City Capitanes (2022–2023) ===
In October 2022, Pérez was selected by the Mexico City Capitanes as the second pick of round two of the 2022 NBA G League draft.

=== Spartans Distrito Capital (2024) ===
On April 6, 2023, Pérez signed with Spartans Distrito Capital of the Venezuelan Superliga Profesional de Baloncesto.

=== Real Estelí (2023–2024) ===
In December 2023, Pérez briefly played for Nicaraguan club Real Estelí, taking part in the 2023–24 Basketball Champions League Americas.

=== Second stint with the Spartans Distrito Capital (2025) ===
In March 2024, he returned to Spartans Distrito Capital of the Venezuelan Superliga Profesional de Baloncesto.

=== Coviran Granada (2025–2026) ===
In the summer of 2025, Pérez signed with Coviran Granada of the Liga ACB. On September 4, CD Estela of the Spanish Primera FEB announced it had signed Pérez on loan from Granada.

On December 15, 2025, Granada recalled Pérez from the loan to play the remainder of the 2025–26 ACB season with the Andalusians.

=== Vaqueros de Bayamón (2026) ===
In June 2026, Pérez signed with Vaqueros de Bayamón of the Puerto Rican Baloncesto Superior Nacional. On June 21, 2026, he recorded his best performance of the regular season, scoring a season-high 32 points while adding 5 rebounds and 5 assists in a 107–99 victory over the Criollos de Caguas.

In the opening round of the playoffs against the Gigantes de Carolina, he had his best game of the series on July 17, 2026, finishing with 30 points, 4 rebounds and 5 assists to help his team take a 90–81 win. He continued his strong playoff run in the following series against the Criollos de Caguas, highlighted by a 32-point performance on August 1, where he out played league MVP Travis Trice, leading his team to a 122–79 victory, and an eventual series win.

On August 23, 2026, Pérez recorded 25 points, four rebounds, two steals, and one block in Game 7 of the 2026 BSN Finals, leading the Vaqueros in scoring in an 81–74 victory over the Santeros de Aguada to secure the championship. Despite leading the Vaqueros in scoring and steals throughout the series, Pérez was not named Finals MVP.

=== Bàsquet Girona (2026–present) ===
On August 25, 2026, Pérez signed with Bàsquet Girona of the Liga ACB and the Europe Cup.

== National team career ==
Pérez has represented the Dominican Republic national team internationally, taking part in the 2022 and the 2025 editions of the FIBA AmeriCup.

== Career statistics ==
Legend
GP	Games played	GS	Games started	MPG	Minutes per game
FG%	Field-goal percentage	3P%	3-point field-goal percentage	FT%	Free-throw percentage
RPG	Rebounds per game	APG	Assists per game	SPG	Steals per game
BPG	Blocks per game	PPG	Points per game	PIR	Performance index rating
**Bold**	Career high

=== Domestic leagues ===
==== Regular season ====
Year	Team	League	GP	MPG	FG%	3P%	FT%	RPG	APG	SPG	BPG	PPG
2025–26	(Spain) Granada	ACB	23	21.5	.462	.349	.843	3.8	1.8	1.7	.3	11.3
2026	(Puerto Rico) Bayamón	BSN	11	30.8	.482	.311	.878	5.6	4.1	2.3	.4	18.2
