= Branden Dawson =

American basketball player (born 1993)

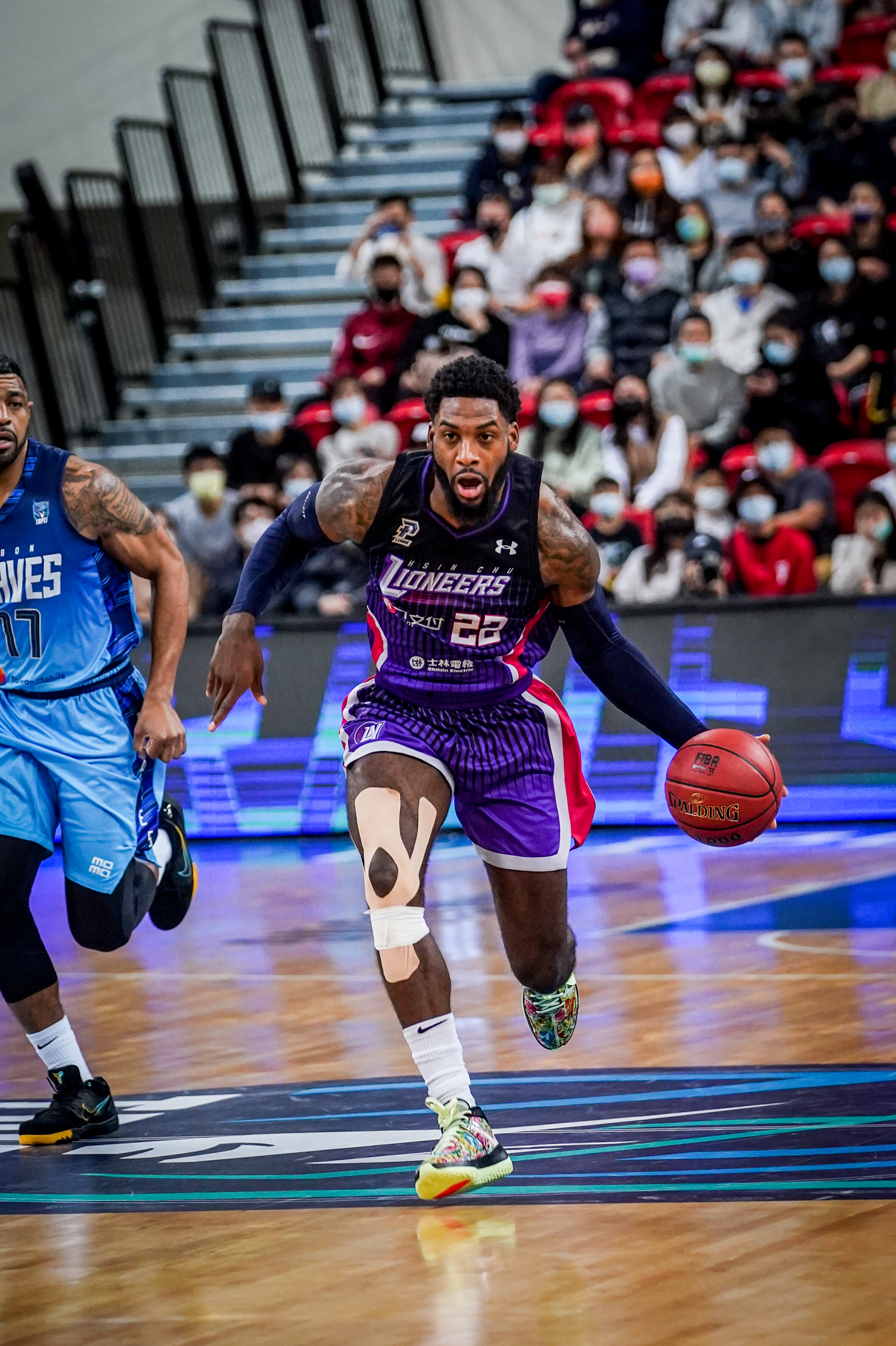
- Dawson's debut with Hsinchu JKO Lioneers of P.League+ in Taiwan

Personal information
- Born: February 1, 1993 (age 33) Gary, Indiana, U.S.
- Listed height: 6 ft 6 in (1.98 m)
- Listed weight: 230 lb (104 kg)

Career information
- High school: Lew Wallace (Gary, Indiana)
- College: Michigan State (2011–2015)
- NBA draft: 2015: 2nd round, 56th overall pick
- Drafted by: New Orleans Pelicans
- Playing career: 2015–2024
- Position: Power forward
- Number: 22

Career history
- 2015–2016: Los Angeles Clippers
- 2015: →Bakersfield Jam
- 2015–2016: →Grand Rapids Drive
- 2016: →Erie BayHawks
- 2016–2017: Erie BayHawks
- 2017: Hapoel Tel Aviv
- 2017–2018: Sun Rockers Shibuya
- 2018: Cañeros del Este
- 2018: San Sebastián
- 2018: Las Fieras de La Villa
- 2018–2019: Soles de Mexicali
- 2019: Gigantes de Jalisco
- 2019: Metropolitanos de Mauricio Báez
- 2019: Cañeros del Este
- 2019: La Mattica
- 2019: Bnei Herzliya
- 2020: Plaza Fernando Valerio
- 2020–2021: Kaohsiung Jeoutai Technology
- 2021–2022: Hsinchu JKO Lioneers
- 2022–2023: TaiwanBeer HeroBears
- 2023: Spartans Distrito Capital
- 2023: Club Rafael Barias
- 2024: CDP Domingo Paulino Santiago
- 2024: Indios de San Francisco de Macorís
- 2025: Correbasket UAT

Career highlights
- T1 League All-Star (2023); Dominican LNB Best Defender (2019); Second-team All-Big Ten (2015); Big Ten All-Defensive Team (2015); Big Ten All-Freshman Team (2012); Big Ten tournament MOP (2014); McDonald's All-American (2011); Third-team Parade All-American (2011)
- Stats at NBA.com
- Stats at Basketball Reference

Branden James Dawson (born February 1, 1993) is an American former professional basketball player. A native of Gary, Indiana, he attended Lew Wallace High School and played college basketball for the Michigan State Spartans. In his senior season for Michigan State, he helped his team reach the Final Four of the NCAA tournament.

== High school career ==
Dawson played high school basketball for Lew Wallace, under coach Renaldo Thomas. He had to sit out most of his freshman season, being academically ineligible. Dawson was selected for the 2011 McDonald's All-American Boys Game following his senior year. In his senior season, Dawson helped his team win the sectional championship; scoring a team-high 13 points, also adding 8 rebounds and 6 steals to his numbers, he helped his Lew Wallace get past Clark. In the regional finals against Western, Dawson had game-highs in scoring and rebounding with 28 and 15 respectively, but his team lost 69–65. As a senior, he averaged 28.7 points, 18.6 rebounds and 5.6 assists for Lew Wallace. Dawson was a five-star recruit according to both Rivals.com and Scout.com and received a 96 grade by ESPN.

College recruiting
Name	Hometown	School	Height	Weight	Commit date
Branden Dawson; SF	Gary, Indiana	Lew Wallace High School	6 ft 6 in (1.98 m)	200 lb (91 kg)	Aug 4, 2010
Branden Dawson; SF	Recruit ratings: Scout: Rivals: (96)				
Overall recruit ranking: Scout: 14, 4 (SF) Rivals: 20, 7 (SF) 247Sports: 17, 4 (SF) ESPN: 23, 5 (SF)
Note: In many cases, Scout, Rivals, 247Sports, On3, and ESPN may conflict in their listings of height and weight.; In these cases, the average was taken. ESPN grades are on a 100-point scale.; Sources: "Michigan State Commit List for 2011". Rivals.; "Men's Basketball Recruiting". Scout.; "ESPN – Michigan State Spartans Basketball Recruiting 2011". ESPN.; "Scout.com Team Recruiting Rankings". Scout.; "2011 Team Ranking". Rivals.

== College career ==
Following interest from several schools, receiving offers from Purdue, Indiana, UCLA, Georgetown and Marquette among others, Dawson verbally committed to Michigan State in August 2010. He had 15 points and 9 rebounds in his first game for the Spartans, an exhibition 85–57 win against Ferris State. Dawson scored 10 points in his competitive debut for Michigan State, a 67–55 loss to North Carolina in the 2011 Carrier Classic. He scored a season high 16 points on two occasions, against UMKC and Minnesota. His freshman season came to an end after he tore his left anterior cruciate ligament, in a game against Ohio State. He still managed to average 8.5 points and 4.5 rebounds per game as a freshman.

Dawson had a double-double in the season opener of his sophomore season, having 15 points and 10 rebounds, against Connecticut. In January, Dawson's double-double performance versus Purdue, with 14 points and 11 rebounds, was overshadowed by an alleged physical altercation with Travis Carroll; the Big Ten after reviewing the incident's footage decided not to discipline Dawson. Dawson was involved in a fight with teammate and roommate Adreian Payne, just before an away game at Penn State; both Dawson and Payne were not allowed to start the game by coach Tom Izzo. A few days after the incident with Payne, Dawson had a season-high performance in both scoring and rebounding, with 18 and 13 respectively, to help the Spartans overcome Wisconsin 49–47. He improved to 8.9 points and 5.9 rebounds per game as a sophomore.

In January 2014, Dawson broke his right hand, after slamming it on a table during a film session. He posted averages 11.2 points, 8.3 rebounds and 1.6 assists in 28.3 minutes per game during his junior season. Dawson returned from injury on March 1, 2014, after missing 9 games, and eventually would lead Michigan State to a 2014 Big Ten men's basketball tournament championship, being named Big Ten tournament Most Outstanding Player.

As a senior, he was named second-team All-Big Ten and Big Ten All-Defensive Team. In 35 games as a senior, Dawson averaged 11.9 points, 9.1 rebounds and 1.7 assists per game. as well as the 2015 Final Four as a senior, where they lost to Duke. "This is the main reason why I chose Michigan State," Dawson said. "It was to be part of championships and Final Fours. It means a lot what has happened over my four years here. I'm never going to forget Michigan State."

During his four-year career at Michigan State Dawson played in 130 games. starting in 121 of them. He averaged 26.6 minutes a game. He averaged 10.1 points a game, and 6.9 Rebounds a game. Throughout his four-year career, Dawson never made a three-point shot in nine attempts. At the time of his graduation, Dawson was Michigan State's all-time leader in blocked shots, with 142.

=== College statistics ===
Legend
GP	Games played	GS	Games started	MPG	Minutes per game
FG%	Field goal percentage	3P%	3-point field goal percentage	FT%	Free throw percentage
RPG	Rebounds per game	APG	Assists per game	SPG	Steals per game
BPG	Blocks per game	PPG	Points per game	**Bold**	Career high

Year	Team	GP	GS	MPG	FG%	3P%	FT%	RPG	APG	SPG	BPG	PPG
2011–12	Michigan State	31	31	20.6	.577	.000	.594	4.5	.9	.9	.8	8.4
2012–13	Michigan State	**36**	**35**	26.9	.531	.000	.538	5.9	1.3	**1.6**	.9	8.9
2013–14	Michigan State	28	23	28.3	**.613**	.000	**.656**	8.3	1.6	1.3	.9	11.2
2014–15	Michigan State	35	32	**30.1**	.535	.000	.490	**9.1**	**1.7**	1.2	**1.7**	**11.9**
Career		130	121	26.6	.559	.000	.558	6.9	1.4	1.3	1.1	10.1

== Professional career ==
=== Los Angeles Clippers (2015–2016) ===
On June 25, 2015, Dawson was selected by the New Orleans Pelicans with the 56th overall pick in the 2015 NBA draft, only to be traded to the Los Angeles Clippers for cash considerations later that night. After posting 12.8 points and 10.3 rebounds in 25.5 minutes per game in the 2015 NBA Summer League, he signed a two-year contract with the Clippers on July 15. During his rookie season, using the flexible assignment rule, Dawson received multiple assignments to the Bakersfield Jam, Grand Rapids Drive and Erie BayHawks of the NBA Development League. On December 28, he made his NBA debut, recording one blocked shot in three minutes of action against the Washington Wizards. On January 2, 2016, in a win over the Philadelphia 76ers, Dawson scored his first two NBA points in nine minutes of action. On July 17, 2016, he was waived by the Clippers.

=== Erie BayHawks (2016–2017) ===
On September 8, 2016, Dawson signed with the Orlando Magic, but was later waived on October 16 after appearing in two preseason games. On October 29, he was acquired by the Erie BayHawks of the NBA Development League as an affiliate player of the Magic. On March 29, 2017, Dawson was waived by the BayHawks.

=== Hapoel Tel Aviv (2017) ===
On March 31, 2017, Dawson signed with Hapoel Tel Aviv of the Israeli Premier League for the rest of the season. In 8 games played for Hapoel, he averaged 8 points and 4.6 rebounds per game.

=== Sun Rockers Shibuya (2017–2018) ===
On August 13, 2017, Dawson signed with the Sun Rockers Shibuya of the Japanese B. League. In 10 games played for the Sun Rockers, he averaged 6.6 points and 2.9 rebounds in 12.2 minutes per game.

=== Cañeros del Este (2018) ===
On July 15, 2019, Dawson signed with Cañeros del Este of the Liga Nacional de Baloncesto.

=== Soles de Mexicali (2018–2019) ===
On December 19, 2018, Dawson signed with Soles de Mexicali of the Mexican Liga Nacional de Baloncesto Profesional (LNBP). On January 9, 2019, Dawson recorded career-highs of 25 points and 18 rebounds, while shooting 10-of-18 from the field, along with seven assists in a 111–90 win over Correcaminos UAT Victoria. In 21 LNBP games played during the 2018–19 season, he averaged 14.2 points, 7.8 rebounds and 2.9 assists per game.

=== Gigantes de Jalisco (2019) ===
Dawson finished out the season with the Gigantes de Jalisco of the Circuito de Baloncesto de la Costa del Pacífico (CIBACOPA).

=== Metropolitanos de Mauricio Báez (2019) ===
In July 2019, Dawson joined Metropolitanos de Mauricio Báez from the Torneo Superior de Baloncesto.

=== Return to Cañeros (2019) ===
On September 3, 2019, Dawson returned to Cañeros del Este of the Liga Nacional de Baloncesto.

=== Bnei Herzliya (2019) ===
On November 29, 2019, Dawson signed a two-month contract with Bnei Herzliya of the Israeli National League as an injury cover for Jakim Donaldson. On December 14, 2019, he parted ways with Herzliya after appearing in two games due to an injury.

On March 3, 2020, Dawson signed with Cocodrilos de Caracas of the Superliga Profesional de Baloncesto.

=== Kaohsiung Jeoutai Technology (2020–2021) ===
In November 2020, Dawson signed a contract with Kaohsiung Jeoutai Technology of Super Basketball League in Taiwan.

On February 7, 2021, Kaohsiung Jeoutai Technology waived Dawson.

=== Hsinchu JKO Lioneers (2021–2022) ===
On February 15, 2021, Dawson signed with Hsinchu JKO Lioneers of P. League+ in Taiwan. On February 21, 2021, Dawnson made his P.League+ debut and scored 21 points and 13 rebounds in a game against the league leading Taipei Fubon Braves. On June 4, 2021, Hsinchu JKO Lioneers announced Dawnson would return to the team the next season.

=== TaiwanBeer HeroBears (2022–2023) ===
On November 2, 2022, Dawson signed with TaiwanBeer HeroBears of T1 League. On April 4, 2023, TaiwanBeer HeroBears terminated the contract relationship with Dawson.

=== Spartans Distrito Capital (2023) ===
On April 22, 2023, Dawson signed with Spartans Distrito Capital of the Superliga Profesional de Baloncesto.

=== Club Rafael Barias (2023) ===
On September 10, 2023, Dawson signed with Club Rafael Barias of the Torneo Superior de Baloncesto.

=== Indios de San Francisco de Macorís (2024) ===
On July 24, 2024, Dawson signed with Indios de San Francisco de Macorís of the Liga Nacional de Baloncesto.

On January 27, 2025, Dawson retired from professional basketball.

== NBA career statistics ==
Legend
GP	Games played	GS	Games started	MPG	Minutes per game
FG%	Field goal percentage	3P%	3-point field goal percentage	FT%	Free throw percentage
RPG	Rebounds per game	APG	Assists per game	SPG	Steals per game
BPG	Blocks per game	PPG	Points per game	**Bold**	Career high

=== Regular season ===
Year	Team	GP	GS	MPG	FG%	3P%	FT%	RPG	APG	SPG	BPG	PPG
2015–16	L.A. Clippers	6	0	4.8	.400	.000	1.000	.7	.0	.0	.2	.8
Career		6	0	4.8	.400	.000	1.000	.7	.0	.0	.2	.8

== Personal life ==
Dawson was born on February 1, 1993, to Leon Albritton and Cassandra Dawson. On March 30, 2010, while a junior at high school, Dawson became a father, to a son named My'Shawn. Dawson received a degree in sociology from Michigan State University.
