= Juan Coronado =

Dominican basketball player (born 1983)

Personal information
- Born: August 25, 1983 (age 43)
- Listed height: 6 ft 1 in (1.85 m)
- Listed weight: 180 lb (82 kg)

Career information
- Playing career: 2003–2022
- Position: Guard

Career history
- 2003–2005: Club Dosa
- 2006–2007: Reales de La Vega
- 2008: Merengueros de Santo Domingo
- 2009–2010: Club Jose Horacio Rodriguez
- 2011: Club San Sebastian
- 2012: Leones de Santo Domingo
- 2012: Halcones de Xalapa
- 2012: Club San Martín de Corrientes
- 2013–2015: Brujos de Guayama
- 2015–2016: Piratas de La Guaira
- 2016: Caciques de Humacao
- 2017–2018: Aguacateros de Michoacán
- 2018–2022: Reales de La Vega

Juan Coronado Gil (born August 25, 1983) is a Dominican basketball player for Reales de La Vega and the Dominican national team, where he participated at the 2014 FIBA Basketball World Cup.
