= Jordan Richard =

American basketball player (born 1989)

No. 22 – Tokyo Hachioji Bee Trains
- Position: Center
- League: B.League

Personal information
- Born: June 3, 1989 (age 37)
- Listed height: 6 ft 9 in (2.06 m)
- Listed weight: 225 lb (102 kg)

Career information
- High school: Los Osos (Rancho Cucamonga, California)
- College: Cal State San Bernardino (2009–2010); Riverside CC (2010–2011); Cal State LA (2011–2013)
- NBA draft: 2013: undrafted
- Playing career: 2013–present

Career history
- 2013: Hopsi Polzela
- 2013–2014: Elitzur Ramla
- 2014–2015: Bawer Matera
- 2016–present: Soles de Santo Domingo Este

Career highlights
- LNB Defensive Player of the Year (2016); First-team All-CCAA (2013)

Jordan Richard (born June 3, 1989) is an American professional basketball player who currently plays for Soles de Santo Domingo Este of the Liga Nacional de Baloncesto (LNB). He played two years of college basketball for Cal State Los Angeles.

== High school career ==
Richard attended Los Osos High School where he earned first-team All-Baseline League honors and was selected to play in the Inland Valley Daily Bulletin All-Star game. They won a pair of league championships.

== College career ==
Richard began his college career at Cal State San Bernardino where he appeared in 24 games and started four times, helping the Coyotes win a conference championship as a freshman while leading his team in blocks with 30.

Richard transferred to Riverside City College as a sophomore where he averaged 4.3 points and 4.1 rebounds per contest. He helped the team win an Orange Coast Conference championship and was named to Jerry Mullen's Top-120 camp.

In his junior season Richard moved to Cal State LA where, in his first season, he set a new program single-season record for blocked shots with 75, breaking a mark that had stood since 1984. He appeared in 27 games and started the final eight games of the season, averaging 5.5 points per game and led the team in rebounding with 6.6 per game. As a senior, Richard averaged 8.5 points, 8.6 rebounds and 4.6 blocks.

== Professional career ==
After going undrafted in the 2013 NBA draft, he spent his first year as a pro with KD Hopsi Polzela of the Slovenian League and Elitzur Ramla of the Israeli Liga Leumit. On August 6, 2014, Richard signed with Bawer Matera of the Italian Serie A2 Basket.

On October 31, 2015, Richard was selected by the Reno Bighorns in the fifth round of the 2015 NBA Development League Draft. However, he was waived on November 12.

== Personal life ==
The son of Teri and Anthony Gooden and Larry and Tracy Richard, he majored in communications.
