= Basketball at the 2023 Central American and Caribbean Games =

- Venue: Gimnasio Nacional José Adolfo Pineda; Plaza Gerardo Barrios
- Location: San Salvador
- Dates: 24 June – 5 July

The Basketball competition at the 2023 Central American and Caribbean Games was held in San Salvador, El Salvador from 24 June to 5 July at the Gimnasio Nacional José Adolfo Pineda. The 3x3 competitions were held at the Plaza Gerardo Barrios.

== Participating nations ==
A total of 9 countries qualified athletes. The number of athletes a nation entered is in parentheses beside the name of the country.

- Bahamas (12)
- Costa Rica (12)
- Cuba (24)
- Dominican Republic (24)
- El Salvador (24)
- Guatemala (16)
- Mexico (24)
- Puerto Rico (24)
- Virgin Islands (12)

== Medal table ==
* Host nation (El Salvador)

Rank	Nation	Gold	Silver	Bronze	Total
1	Dominican Republic (DOM)	1	1	2	4
1	Puerto Rico (PUR)	1	1	2	4
3	Mexico (MEX)	1	1	0	2
4	U.S. Virgin Islands (ISV)	1	0	0	1
5	Venezuela (VEN)	0	1	0	1
Totals (5 entries)		4	4	4	12

== Medal summary ==
=== 5X5 events ===
Event	Gold	Silver	Bronze
Men	Dominican Republic (DOM); Luis Montero; Rigoberto Mendoza; Luis Santos; Juan Adolfo Guerrero; Andrés Feliz; Jean Montero; Angel Suero; Antonio Pena; Gelvis Solano; Jhonatan Aráujo; Juan Miguel Suero; Victor Liz	Mexico (MEX); Moisés Andriassi; José Gutiérrez; Jonatan Machado; Ivan Montano; Fabián Jaimes; Yahir Bonilla; Diego Willis; Gabriel Girón; Daniel Amigo; Victor Valdes; Juan Camargo; Juan Reyna	Puerto Rico (PUR); Rafael Pinzon; Wilfredo Rodríguez; Angel Matías; Gabriel Belardo; Christian Negron; Jase Febres; Arnaldo Toro; Jorge Pacheco; Andre Curbelo; Dimencio Vaughn; Alexander Kappos; Jordan Cintron
Women	U.S. Virgin Islands (ISV); Kadasha Barry; Kashara Romain; Imani Tate; November Morton; Shomyra Francis; Natalie Kleemann-Day; Kaya Evans; Naja Ngongba; J-naya Ephraim; Anisha George; Lanese Bough	Dominican Republic (DOM); Yohanna Morton; Rocio Jiménez; Yenifer Jiménez; Cheisy Hernández; Maira Marte De La Rosa; Genesis Envangelista; Esmery Martínez; Angela Jiménez; Maira Horford; Yamile Rodríguez; Cesarina Capellan; Sugeiry Monsac	Puerto Rico (PUR); Jacqueline Benítez; Mya Hollingshed; Pamela Rosado; Jada Stinson; Sofia Roma; Trinity San Antonio; Kaelynn Satterfield; Adryana Quezada; Mariah Perez; India Pagan; Brianna Jones; Tayra Meléndez

=== 3X3 events ===
Event	Gold	Silver	Bronze
Men	Puerto Rico (PUR); Antonio Ralat; Adrian Ocasio; Luis Cuascut; Brian Vazquez	Venezuela (VEN); Luis Duarte; Ernesto Hernandez; Jose Bracho; Kevin Nino	Dominican Republic (DOM); Henry Valdez; Cesar Reyes; Shamil Bellas; Adonis Nunez
Women	Mexico (MEX); Alejandra Rovira; Karina Esquer; Miranda Zamora; Deyna Gonzalez	Puerto Rico (PUR); Mari Plácido; Ashley Torres; Annelisse Vargas; Alicia Penzo	Dominican Republic (DOM); Cheisy Hernandez; Nayely Morillo; Maria Marte De La Rosa; Yadira Polanco
