= Adris De León =

Dominican basketball player

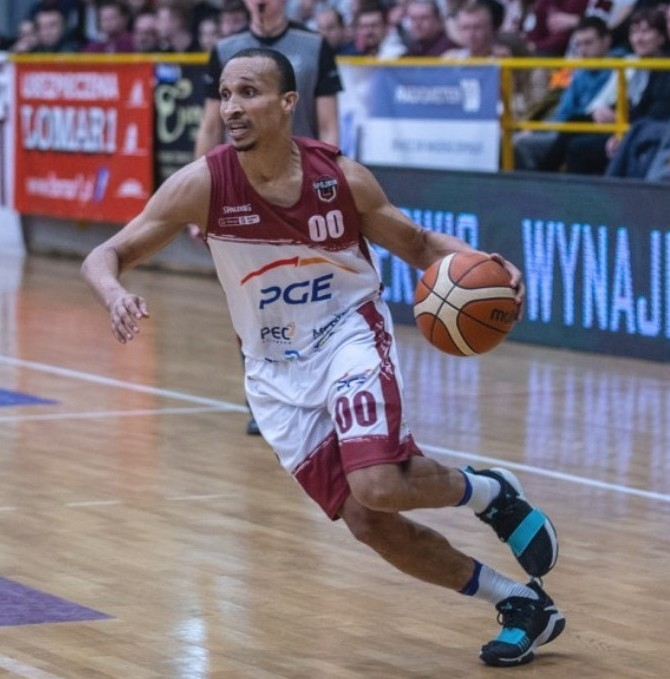
- De León with Spójnia Stargard in 2019

No. 10 – Metros de Santiago
- Position: Point guard
- League: Liga Nacional de Baloncesto

Personal information
- Born: July 10, 1984 (age 42) Dominican Republic
- Listed height: 5 ft 11 in (1.80 m)
- Listed weight: 165 lb (75 kg)

Career information
- High school: Louis D. Brandeis (New York City, New York)
- College: College of the Siskiyous (2005–2006); College of Southern Idaho (2006–2007); Eastern Washington (2007–2009)
- NBA draft: 2009: undrafted
- Playing career: 2010–present

Career history
- 2010: Halifax Rainmen
- 2010–2011: CDP Domingo Paulino Santiago
- 2010: Indios de San Francisco
- 2010: La Cancha
- 2011: Palencia Baloncesto
- 2011–2012: Gold Coast Blaze
- 2012–2014: Metros de Santiago
- 2012–2013: Wollongong Hawks
- 2013: Vaqueros de Bayamón
- 2014: Piratas de Quebradillas
- 2016–2018: CDP Domingo Paulino Santiago
- 2016: Atenienses de Manatí
- 2016–2018: Metros de Santiago
- 2017: Las Fieras de La Villa
- 2018: Adelaide 36ers
- 2019: MKS Dąbrowa Górnicza
- 2019–2020: Spójnia Stargard
- 2020–present: Metros de Santiago

Career highlights
- 2× Santiago League champion (2017, 2018); 2× LNB champion (2014, 2017); NBL Best Sixth Man (2013); All-NBL Third Team (2012)

Adris Geraldo De León Jiménez (born July 10, 1984) is a Dominican professional basketball player for Metros de Santiago of the Liga Nacional de Baloncesto. He has previously played in Canada, Spain, Puerto Rico and Poland, and is well known in Australia, having played for the Gold Coast Blaze, Wollongong Hawks and Adelaide 36ers while claiming the NBL Best Sixth Man Award in 2013.

== Early life and streetball fame ==
De León was born in the Dominican Republic, but his family emigrated to the United States and settled down in Washington Heights, Manhattan. De León attended Louis D. Brandeis High School on the Upper West Side of Manhattan, but rarely attended class. He did not play basketball seriously until the summer for his senior year, when he played on the AAU team and traveled the country. He attended the College of the Siskiyous in California and the College of Southern Idaho before eventually graduating from Eastern Washington University in 2009. From there, he carved out his niche at the Dyckman Park, West 4th, Rucker Park, Pro City and Hoops in the Sun summer leagues. His play earned him the nickname, "2 Hard 2 Guard". In 2011, De León and NBA player Brandon Jennings competed against each other for the moniker of "2 Hard 2 Guard". De León led his East squad to a 78–55 win over Jennings and his West team, which included fellow NBA player DeMar DeRozan. Both players went at each other throughout the night but in the end, De León outplayed and outscored Jennings.

== Professional career ==
In December 2009, De León joined Canadian team the Halifax Rainmen for the 2010 PBL season. He left the team halfway through the season to train with the Dominican Republic national team. In 10 games, he averaged 9.2 points, 2.4 rebounds and 1.1 assists per game.

Throughout 2010, De León played in multiple leagues in his home country of the Dominican Republic, including most notably the Liga Nacional de Baloncesto. It began an annual tradition, with yearly stints playing for CDP Domingo Paulino Santiago and Metros de Santiago.

In February 2011, De León signed with Spanish team Palencia Baloncesto for the rest of the 2010–11 season. In seven games, he averaged 2.4 points per game.

In October 2011, De León signed with Australian team the Gold Coast Blaze for the 2011–12 NBL season. In his debut for the Blaze on October 29, De León recorded two points and one steal in just under 14 minutes against the Townsville Crocodiles. In his second game on November 12, he recorded 21 points and eight assists against the Perth Wildcats. He went on to register two more 20-plus point games to round out November. On December 2, he recorded 17 points and a season-high 11 rebounds against the Cairns Taipans. On February 10, he recorded 29 points and eight assists against the Sydney Kings. On March 4, he scored a season-high 33 points against the Kings. In 28 games for the Blaze, he averaged 16.6 points, 4.3 rebounds, 3.2 assists and 1.6 steals per game.

On August 27, 2012, De León signed with the Wollongong Hawks for the 2012–13 NBL season. He earned the NBL Best Sixth Man Award, becoming the first ever Hawks player to win the award. In 30 games for the Hawks, he averaged 16.4 points, 3.6 rebounds, 3.1 assists and 1.3 steals per game.

In 2013, De León played in the Baloncesto Superior Nacional for Vaqueros de Bayamón. The following year, he played for Piratas de Quebradillas.

On August 10, 2018, De León signed with the Adelaide 36ers for the 2018–19 NBL season. On November 10, 2018, he parted ways with the 36ers.

In January 2019, De León signed with Polish team MKS Dąbrowa Górnicza.

On December 2, 2019, he has signed with Spójnia Stargard of the PLK.
