= Víctor Liz =

Dominican basketball player

Víctor Antonio Liz
No. 20 – Piratas de Quebradillas
- Position: Guard
- League: BSN

Personal information
- Born: 12 May 1986 (age 40) Santiago de los Caballeros, Santiago Province
- Listed height: 6 ft 1 in (1.85 m)
- Listed weight: 185 lb (84 kg)

Career information
- Playing career: 2010–present

Career history
- 2010–2012: Metros de Santiago
- 2012–2013: Atleticos de San German
- 2014: Gaiteros del Zulia
- 2015: Defensor Sporting
- 2016: Guaiqueríes de Margarita
- 2013–2016: Metros de Santiago
- 2017–2018: Obras Sanitarias
- 2019–2020: Mineros de Zacatecas
- 2016–2021: Leones de Ponce
- 2021–2025: Capitanes de Arecibo
- 2026–present: Piratas de Quebradillas

Career highlights
- 1× BSN champion (2021); 4× LNB Champion (2014, 2015, 2017, 2022); BSN Scoring Champion (2020)
Medals
Men's basketball
Representing the Dominican Republic
Central American and Caribbean Games
Gold medal – first place	2023 San Salvador	Team

Víctor Antonio Liz (born 12 May 1986) is a Dominican professional basketball for the Piratas de Quebradillas of the Baloncesto Superior Nacional (BSN). Internationally, Liz represents and plays for the Dominican national team, where he participated at the 2014 FIBA Basketball World Cup. Liz won a gold medal with his national team at the 2023 Central American and Caribbean Games held in San Salvador, El Salvador.
