= Pedro Chourio =

Venezuelan basketball player (born 1990)

No. 9 – Guaiqueries de Margarita
- Position: Shooting guard
- League: Venezuelan SuperLiga

Personal information
- Born: March 13, 1990 (age 36) Zulia, Venezuela
- Listed height: 1.86 m (6 ft 1 in)
- Listed weight: 180 lb (82 kg)

Career information
- NBA draft: 2012: undrafted
- Playing career: 2011–present

Career history
- 2011: Trotamundos
- 2013: Caquetios de Falcon
- 2014: Trotamundos
- 2018: Guaros de Lara
- 2018: Estudiantes Concordia
- 2019: Trotamundos
- 2019: Estudiantes Concordia
- 2020: Spartans Distrito Capital
- 2022: Dorados de Chihuahua
- 2022: Olímpico
- 2023-2024: Cocodrilos de Caracas
- 2024-present: Guaiqueries de Margarita

Career highlights
- 2× Venezuelan League champion (2018, 2020); Venezuelan League Finals MVP (2020)

Pedro Chourio (born 13 March, 1990) is a Venezuelan professional basketball player who plays for Guaiqueries of the Venezuelan SuperLiga.

== Club career ==
Chourio started his professional career at the Trotamundos B.B.C. in the Venezuelan Liga Profesional de Baloncesto in 2011, and played there for 3 consecutive seasons before moving to the Caquetios de Falcon for a season where he averaged 5.33 points. He returned to Trotamundos B.B.C. in 2014, he stayed at the club until 2018 where he averaged 10.37 points in the 2018 season. He moved to Guaros de Lara and averaged 3.50 points during his stay there. He moved to Estudiantes Concordia in late 2018 where he averaged 7.79 points per game. He then again returned to Trotamundos B.B.C. in 2019 where he averaged 9.97 points and then returned to Estudiantes Concordia for the 2019–20 season.

Chourio played in the 2020 Venezuelan SuperLiga with Spartans Distrito Capital. He helped the Spartans win its first national title, while earning Finals MVP honours. On February 10, 2021, he re-signed with the team.

== National team career ==
Chourio represented Venezuela at the 2019 FIBA Basketball World Cup where he averaged 4.4 points and 1.6 rebounds at the tournament.
