= Miguel Angel Pichardo =

Dominican Republic basketball player

Personal information
- Born: February 8, 1980 (age 46)
Medal record
Men's basketball
Representing the Dominican Republic
Pan American Games
Silver medal – second place	2003 Santo Domingo

Miguel Angel Pichardo Sosa (born February 8, 1980, in Santiago, Dominican Republic) is a professional basketball player. He is 6 ft 9 (2.06 m) and plays center. Pichardo is member of the Dominican Republic national basketball team.
