= Manuel Fortuna =

Dominican basketball player

Personal information
- Born: March 23, 1985 (age 41) Santo Domingo
- Listed height: 6 ft 2 in (1.88 m)
- Listed weight: 180 lb (82 kg)
- Position: Guard

Elpidio Manuel Fortuna Lara (born March 23, 1985) is a Dominican former basketball player.

He played on club level for Leones de Santo Domingo.

For the Dominican national team, he participated at several Centrobasket Championships, the Central American and Caribbean Games in 2006, 2010 and 2014, the Pan American Games in 2015, the FIBA Americas Championship in 2011 and 2013 and the 2014 FIBA Basketball World Cup.

Manuel Fortuna and his brother José Guillermo retired from playing in 2022.
