= Rigoberto Mendoza (basketball) =

Dominican basketball player (born 1992)

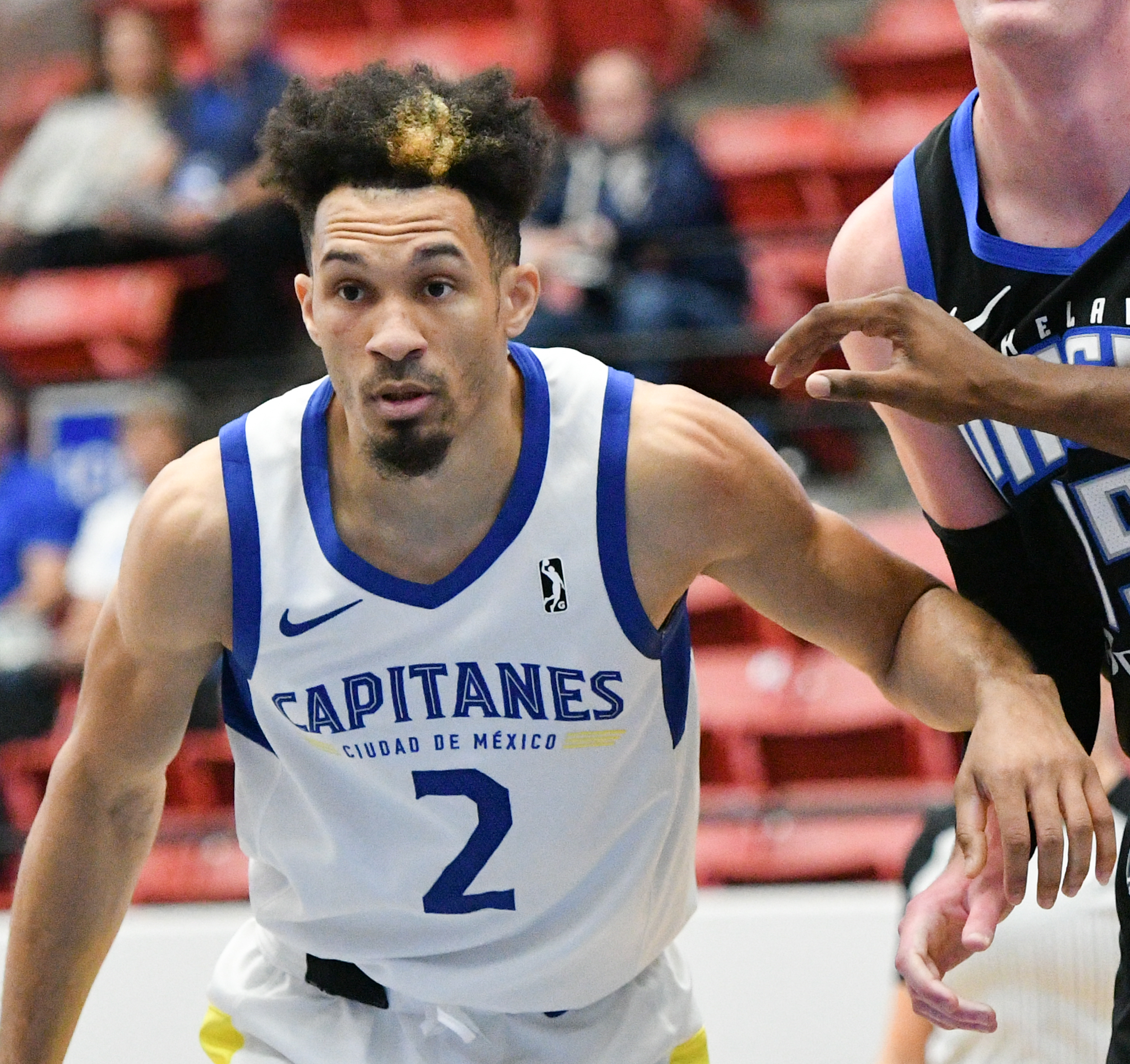
- Mendoza with the Mexico City Capitanes in 2021

No. 26 – Astros de Jalisco
- Position: Point guard / Shooting guard
- League: LNBP

Personal information
- Born: 6 July 1992 (age 34) San Cristóbal, Dominican Republic
- Listed height: 6 ft 3 in (1.91 m)
- Listed weight: 190 lb (86 kg)

Career information
- NBA draft: 2014: undrafted
- Playing career: 2013–present

Career history
- 2013: Reales de La Vega
- 2014–2015: Iraurgi SB
- 2015: Los Buitres
- 2015–2017: Santeros de Aguada
- 2017: Estudiantes Concordia
- 2018–2019: Capitanes de Ciudad de México
- 2019: Santeros de Aguada
- 2019–2020: Dorados de Chihuahua
- 2020–2021: Maccabi Haifa
- 2021: Cariduros de Fajardo
- 2021–2022: Mexico City Capitanes
- 2022: Real Estelí
- 2022–present: Astros de Jalisco
- 2022–2023: Mexico City Capitanes
- 2023: Piratas de La Guaira
- 2023–2024: Monbus Obradoiro
- 2025: Petro de Luanda
- 2026–present: Santeros de Aguada

Career highlights
- BCL Americas steals leader (2022); BSN champion (2019); BSN Finals MVP (2019); LNBP Most Valuable Player (2019)
Medals
Men's basketball
Representing the Dominican Republic
Centrobasket
Bronze medal – third place	2016 Panama	Dominican Republic
Central American and Caribbean Games
Gold medal – first place	2023 San Salvador	Team

Rigoberto Mendoza (born 6 July 1992) is a Dominican professional basketball player for the Astros de Jalisco of the Liga Nacional de Baloncesto Profesional (LNBP). He is also signed with Santeros de Aguada of the Baloncesto Superior Nacional (BSN). He has played in Spain, Israel, Venezuela, and Mexico throughout his professional career.

== Professional career ==
Mendoza debuted in the Dominican league, where he played for Reales de La Vega. Later, he further gained experience in Spanish, Puerto Rican and Argentine basketball.

He joined Capitanes de Ciudad de México of the Liga Nacional de Baloncesto Profesional for the 2017–2018 season, the first in franchise history. His impact was felt immediately as he averaged 15.7 points, as well as 2.8 assists per game. In his second season he stepped forward and improved in every aspect of the game, as his team's leader at the guard position. He maintained his 15 points and raised his assist average. He also stayed close to five rebounds per game. In 2018–19, Mendoza had a stellar season and helped his team achieve 27 victories. He eventually became league's Most Valuable Player, despite not leading any of the statistical sections of the LNBP. In the postseason, he led his team to the second final in team history.

Mendoza began the 2020–21 season with Dorados de Chihuahua, averaging 12 points and 4 assists per game. On November 17, 2020, Mendoza signed with Maccabi Haifa of the Israeli Basketball Premier League.

On November 5, 2021, Mendoza signed with the Mexico City Capitanes of the NBA G League.

On January 19, 2022, Mendoza signed with Real Estelí of the Liga Superior de Baloncesto.

On April 16, 2023, Mendoza signed with Piratas de La Guaira of the Superliga Profesional de Baloncesto.

On July 14, 2023, Mendoza signed with Monbus Obradoiro of the Spanish Liga ACB.

On January 13, 2025, Mendoza signed a one-year contract with Petro de Luanda, the defending champions of the Basketball Africa League (BAL) and the Angolan Basketball League.

== National team ==
Mendoza has played for the Dominican Republic national basketball team on many occasions. At the 2019 FIBA World Cup in China, he was one of the cornerstones of the team that surprisingly beat Germany and advanced to the second round instead of the heavily favored competitor. Mendoza won a gold medal with his national team at the 2023 Central American and Caribbean Games held in San Salvador, El Salvador.
