= Ed Elisma =

American basketball player (born 1975)

Personal information
- Born: April 9, 1975 (age 51) Miami, Florida, U.S.
- Listed height: 6 ft 9 in (2.06 m)
- Listed weight: 213 lb (97 kg)

Career information
- High school: LaSalle (New York City, New York)
- College: Georgia Tech (1993–1997)
- NBA draft: 1997: 2nd round, 40th overall pick
- Drafted by: Seattle SuperSonics
- Playing career: 1997–present
- Position: Power forward / center

Career history
- 1997–1998: Hapoel Eilat
- 1998: Muller Verona
- 1998–1999: Dinamo Sassari
- 1999–2000: Spirou Charleroi
- 2000–2001: Chicago Skyliners
- 2001: Guaiqueríes de Margarita
- 2001: Leones de Ponce
- 2001–2002: Ironi Ramat Gan
- 2002: Leones de Ponce
- 2002–2003: Asheville Altitude
- 2003: Gallitos de Isabela
- 2003–2004: Shandong Lions
- 2004: Purefoods Tender Juicy Hotdogs
- 2004–2005: Henan Dragons
- 2005: Barangay Ginebra Kings
- 2005–2006: Petrochimi Bandar Imam
- 2006: Al Kuwait
- 2006: Caneros de La Romana
- 2007–2008: Shahrdari Gorgan
- 2008: San Lazaro
- 2008: Constituyentes de San Cristóbal
- 2008–2009: Cocodrilos de Caracas
- 2009–2010: Halcones Rojos Veracruz
- 2011–2012: Indios de San Francisco
- 2013: Cupes de Los Pepines
- 2013–2014: Indios de San Francisco

Career highlights
- Israeli League Rebounding Leader (1998)
- Stats at Basketball Reference

Edner Elisma (born April 9, 1975) is an American former professional basketball player who last played for Indios de San Francisco in Dominican Republic. In 1997–98 he was the top rebounder in the Israel Basketball Premier League.

== College basketball ==
Ed Elisma, a top recruit out of high school, played for the Georgia Tech basketball team, where he finished four-year stint as the school's third all-time leading shot-blocker, behind only former NBA players John Salley and Malcolm Mackey. Among his teammates were future NBA players Stephon Marbury, Travis Best, Matt Harpring and Drew Barry. Elisma started the last 93 games of his career at center for the Yellow Jackets.

Career highs include 36 points against Wake Forest and 15 rebounds against Louisville in his senior season. In 122 games, he averaged 7.4 points, 6.3 rebounds and 1.5 blocks a game on 55.0 percent field-goal shooting.

After his solid four-year college career, Elisma participated in the Portsmouth Invitational Tournament and the Nike Desert Classic prior to the NBA Draft. He entered the 1997 NBA draft and was selected as the #41 pick by the Seattle SuperSonics.

== Professional career ==
Elisma did not sign a contract with the Sonics and moved to play in Israel with a team called Hapoel Eilat, whom he led to the 1998 playoffs final. In 1997–98 he was the top rebounder in the Israel Basketball Premier League. Afterwards he left to play in Italy for the season.

Elisma also played in Belgium, Puerto Rico, the Dominican Republic and Venezuela before he returned to Israel. He has played in various summer leagues with the Seattle SuperSonics, Boston Celtics, and Toronto Raptors and also the ABA. He also played in the Philippines and Iran.

== Career statistics ==
7 seasons
| Season | Team | Pts Avg | Rebs Avg | | |
| 1997–1998 | Hapoel Eilat (Israel) | 17.0 points | 9.4 rebounds | – | – |
| 1998–1999 | Muller Verona (Italian A-1 League), B. Sardegna Sassari (Italian A-2 League) | 12.1 points | 9.7 rebounds | – | – |
| 1999–2000 | Spirou Charleroi (Belgium) | 10.7 points | 7.5 rebounds | – | – |
| 2000–2001 | Chicago Skyliners (ABA) | 11.5 points | 6.8 rebounds | – | – |
| 2001–2002 | Ironi Ramat Gan (Israel) | 11.0 points | 5.5 rebounds | – | – |
| 2002–2003 | Asheville Altitude (National Basketball Development League) | 6.1 points | 4.3 rebounds | 1.1 assists | 20.9 minutes |
