= Marineros de Puerto Plata =

Basketball team

Marineros De Puerto Plata
- Leagues: Liga Nacional de Baloncesto
- Founded: 2005
- History: Marineros de Puerto Plata (2005–2009)(2022- Present); Tiburones de Puerto Plata (2010); Huracanes del Atlántico (2011–2022)
- Arena: Polideportivo Fabio Rafael González (capacity: 4.500)
- Location: (Dominican Republic) Puerto Plata
- Team colors: Blue, white
- President: (Dominican Republic) Hugo José González
| Home | Away |

Marineros de Puerto Plata are a professional basketball team based in Puerto Plata, Dominican Republic. The team currently plays in Dominican top division Liga Nacional de Baloncesto.
