= Juan Miguel Suero =

Dominican basketball player

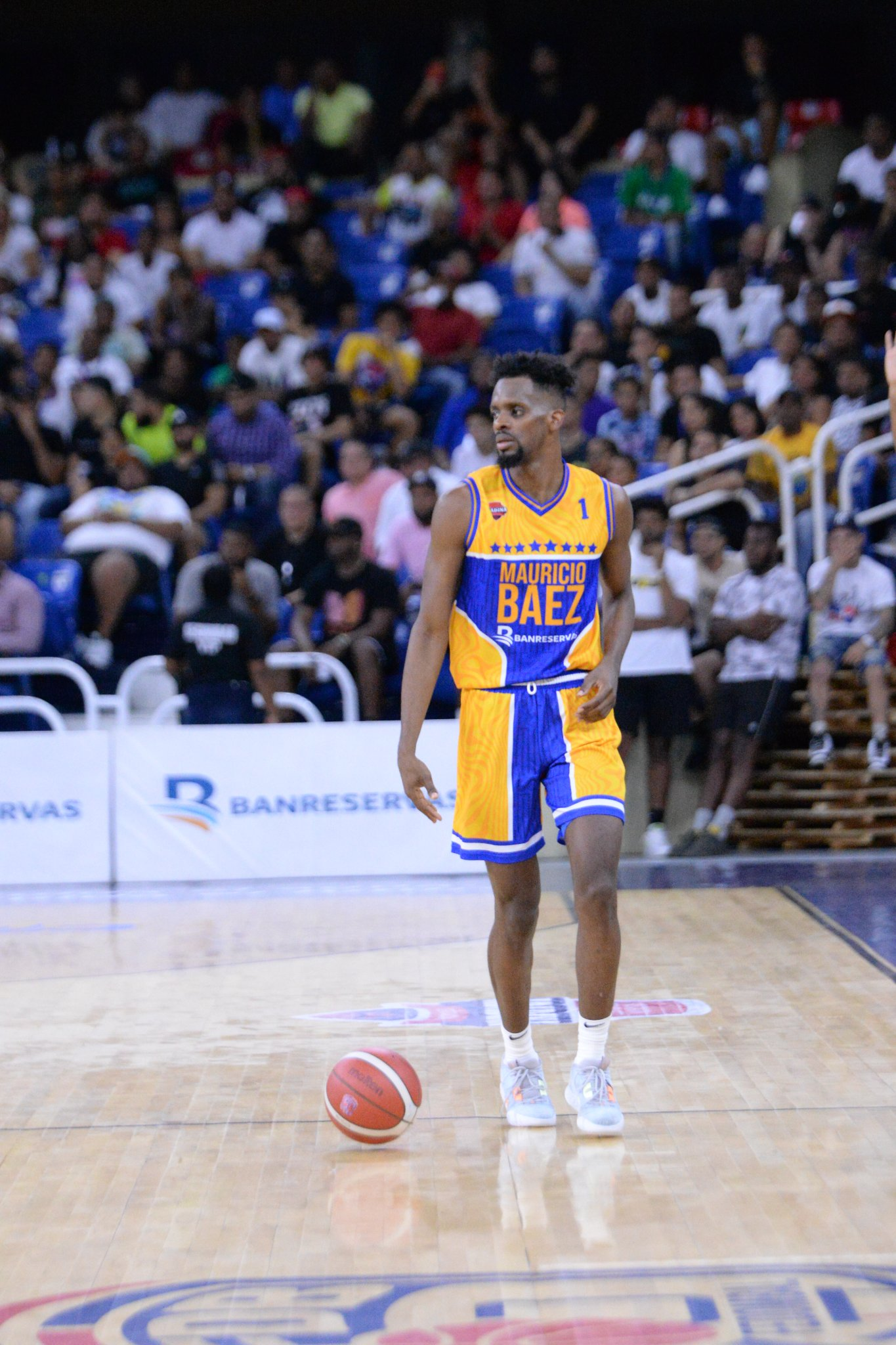

No. 1 – Spartans Distrito Capital
- Position: Shooting guard / small forward
- League: Superliga Profesional de Baloncesto

Personal information
- Born: May 11, 1993 (age 33) Santo Domingo, Dominican Republic
- Listed height: 6 ft 5 in (1.96 m)
- Listed weight: 185 lb (84 kg)

Career information
- NBA draft: 2015: undrafted
- Playing career: 2014–present

Career history
- 2014–2016: Soles de Santo Domingo
- 2014–2015: CB Clavijo
- 2016–2017: Gaiteros del Zulia
- 2017–2019: Indios de San Francisco
- 2019: Cariduros de Fajardo
- 2019–2020: Dorados de Chihuahua
- 2020–2022: Cupes de los Pepines
- 2023–2025: Piratas de La Guaira
- 2025–present: Spartans Distrito Capital

Career highlights
- LNBP East Zone MVP (2020)
Medals
Men's basketball
Representing the Dominican Republic
Central American and Caribbean Games
Gold medal – first place	2023 San Salvador	Team

Juan Miguel Castillo Suero (born 11 May 1993) is a Dominican professional basketball player for the Spartans Distrito Capital of the Superliga Profesional de Baloncesto (SPB).

== Professional career ==
Suero played the 2014–15 season at CB Clavijo, he averaged 1.56 point, 0.82 rebound and 0.45 assists. He moved to the Venezuela side Gaiteros del Zulia in the 2016–17 season, he averaged 22.25 point, 4.58 rebound and 4.57 assists. In the 2018–19 season, he moved to the Cariduros de Fajardo, he averaged 17.08 points, 5.36 rebound and 5.64 assists. He played the 2019–20 season at Dorados de Chihuahua, where he averaged 14.21 point, 5.13 rebound and 4.13 assists. He was named the 2019–20 LNBP East Zone MVP for his performance. He also played a game for Cariduros de Fajardo in the 2019–20 season.

== International career ==
Suero played at the basketball event in the 2014 Central American and Caribbean Games, he averaged 1.5 point, 1 rebound and 1.5 assists. He also played in the 2016 Centrobasket, where he averaged 2 point, 1.2 rebound and 0.5 assist. He participated in the 2017 FIBA AmeriCup. He played in the 2019 FIBA Basketball World Cup in China, where he averaged 0.7 point and 1 rebound. Suero won a gold medal with his national team at the 2023 Central American and Caribbean Games held in San Salvador, El Salvador.
