= Gelvis Solano =

Dominican basketball player

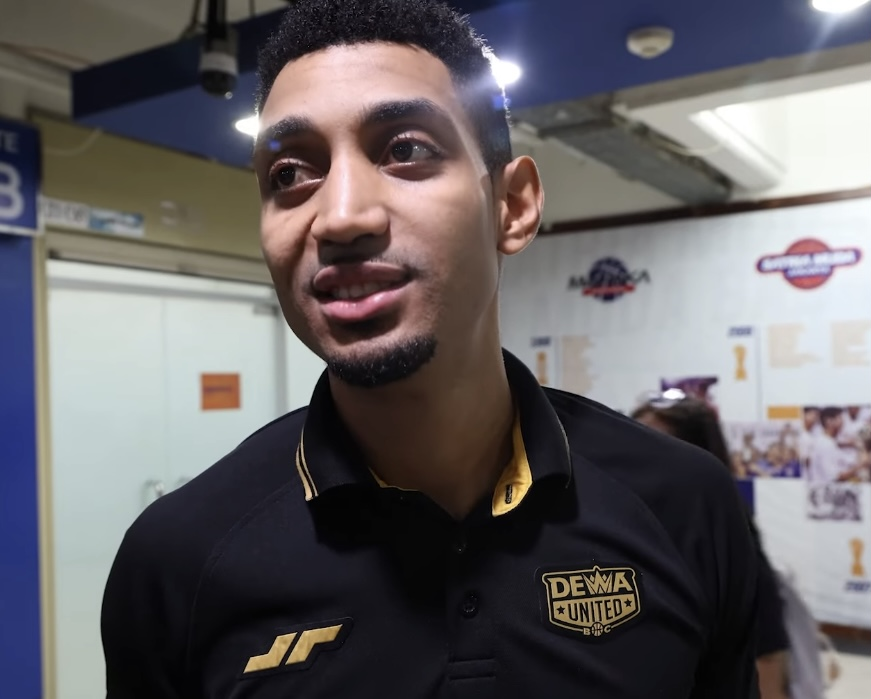
- Solano with Dewa United in 2024

Calor de Cancún
- Position: Point guard
- League: LNBP

Personal information
- Born: 1 June 1994 (age 32) Santo Domingo, Dominican Republic
- Listed height: 1.85 m (6 ft 1 in)
- Listed weight: 82 kg (181 lb)

Career information
- College: Merrimack (2012–2016)
- NBA draft: 2016: undrafted
- Playing career: 2016–present

Career history
- 2016: Club Sameji
- 2016: Reales de La Vega
- 2016: Rebeldes del Enriquillo
- 2016–2017: Atlético Echagüe
- 2017: Hunan Yongsheng
- 2017–2018: Bergamo Basket 2014
- 2018: Reales de La Vega
- 2018–2019: Ciclista Olímpico
- 2019–2020: Club Athletico Paulistano
- 2020: Mineros de Zacatecas
- 2021: Gregorio Urbano Gilbert
- 2021: Tigrillos Medellín
- 2021: Rebeldes del Enriquillo
- 2021–2022: Szolnoki Olaj
- 2022: Gregorio Urbano Gilbert
- 2022: Reales de La Vega
- 2022: Cocodrilos de Caracas
- 2022–2023: Brampton Honey Badgers
- 2023: Aguada
- 2023: Reales de La Vega
- 2023: Club San Carlos
- 2024: Dewa United Banten
- 2024: Reales de La Vega
- 2024–2025: Dewa United Banten
- 2025: DOSS Basketball
- 2026–present: El Calor de Cancún

Career highlights
- 2× All-IBL First Team (2024, 2025); 2x IBL All-Star (2024, 2025); IBL champion (2025)

Gelvis Andres Solano Paulino (born 1 June 1994) is a Dominican professional basketball player for El Calor de Cancún of the Liga Nacional de Baloncesto Profesional (LNBP). He played college basketball for the Merrimack Warriors.

== Early life ==
Solano is the son of Andrés Solano, a former member of the Dominican Republic national baseball team. Like many Dominican kids, he started out playing baseball. At the age of 9, he switched to basketball.

== College career ==
He played four years at Merrimack College from 2012 to 2016 where he finished as all-time second place for points scored.

== Professional career ==
After he finished College in the US, Solano went back to Dominican to play for Reales de La Vega. The team reached the playoffs, but lost in the second round before the semifinals. Then, he played in the second division there for the Enriquillo Rebels and soon gained the nickname as Dominican Westbrook. His debut in Argentina top league came with Atlético Echagüe in 2016/17. His career continued with Hunan Yongsheng, of the National Basketball League (China). His best match was against Hebei Xianglan Kylins, in which he converted 60 points. Solano recalls that he recorded many steals Later, he went on to Bergamo Basket 2014, of the Italian Serie A2 Basket before he returned to the Dominican Republic and in the summer of 2018 he became champion with Reales de La Vega.

After evaluating his options, he went on to play for Ciclista Olímpico in Argentina. Olympic came from an opaque performance in the Super 20 and decided to release Sebastián Vázquez, in favor of Solano.

Olímpico closed the regular phase in eleventh position and went against Obras Sanitarias where Olímpico struggled but was able to close the series 3–2. After eliminating Obras, Olímpico focused on Club La Unión, which Solano helped beat 3–0 in the series. Solano had a direct duel with Federico Marín. Gelvis commented on the matter: “I saw that he was celebrating too much in our house and that is disrespectful. I took it a little personal.”

In January 2024, Solano joined the Dewa United Banten of the Indonesian Basketball League (IBL). In December 2024, he returned to the Dewa United Banten for the 2025 IBL season.

== National team ==
Solano has been a member of the Dominican Republic national basketball team. Gelvis returned to wear the shirt of his country in the AmeriCup, which was played in Uruguay.

At the 2019 FIBA World Cup in China, he was one of the cornerstones of the team that surprisingly beat Germany and advanced to the second round instead of the heavily favored competitor.

Solano won a gold medal with his national team at the 2023 Central American and Caribbean Games held in San Salvador, El Salvador.
