= Kelvin Peña =

American internet personality

Kelvin Peña (born August 11, 1998), also known by the moniker Brother Nature, is an American internet personality known for his viral Twitter videos of himself befriending wild animals. He rose to prominence for interacting with a small herd of deer that visited his backyard, whom he later named and referred to collectively as the Deer Squad. As of October 2021 he currently has 2 million Twitter followers. Peña is also the founder of the nonprofit organization Everybody Eats Foundation.

== Early life and education ==
Peña was born in New York to a Dominican father and a Puerto Rican mother. He moved to Puerto Rico with his mother as an infant and lived there until he was 8, after which he moved to Killeen, Texas. He spent summers in Washington Heights, Manhattan with his father. He was on the swim team at Shoemaker High School, from which he graduated in 2016 with a 3.80 GPA and ranked 16th in his class. He is the brother of New York-based rapper, Slayter.

== Career ==
Peña first received media attention for a viral Twitter video in August 2016 when he was 17, in which he was interacting with and speaking to a wild deer in his backyard in East Stroudsburg, Pennsylvania. He named this deer Money. He released several more videos that showed him feeding several more deer, playing basketball around them, and naming them. He used the catchphrase "everybody eats" in the videos. He later named the family of deer in his yard "the Deer Squad" and called them Canela, Bambi, and Lola.

Peña regularly posts videos of himself traveling internationally and interacting with animals such as chimpanzees, penguins, and goats.

Super Deluxe licensed a short documentary called Deer Squad, which profiled Peña and the family of deer he had befriended. The film premiered at the 2017 Sundance Film Festival in the Shorts Programming category. Director Scott J. Ross stated that he and his collaborators had contacted Peña the day after Peña's first viral video to shoot the documentary.

=== Everybody Eats Foundation ===
Peña created the nonprofit organization Everybody Eats Foundation in late 2016 to, "help single-parent families during the holidays and after-school kids year-round." That Thanksgiving, the organization delivered 150 turkeys to churches and families in need. After Hurricane Maria, Peña used Everybody Eats to raise money and supplies for the victims. He raised over $3,000 in donations from his Twitter followers.

== Controversies ==
In October 2018, several Tweets surfaced in which Peña used negrophobic and antisemitic language. According to the date of the Tweets, Peña was 12 years old at the time they were published. He posted a note on Twitter apologizing for his language. In the note, he stated "I apologize for 12-year-old Kelvin and take total responsibility for my words. Everyone changes, everyone learns, everyone makes mistakes."

In December 2019, Peña visited Miami, Florida for a beach clean up event. On the night of December 6th, videos surfaced on Twitter of him being violently hit and kicked in a sandwich shop as bystanders looked on. Twitter user @phatdabb_gmn, who had been pictured in a club with Peña a day earlier, tweeted "I just beat the dog shit outta brother nature in la Sandwicherie," though the tweet has been deleted. The attack was originally seen as an unincited assault on Peña, though it was later revealed that he had been instigating restaurant staff and customers by demanding to be served as the store was closing. Peña was filmed by a group of strangers as he did this, and challenged them to a fight when they wouldn't delete their videos.
