= Titanes del Sur =

Basketball team in the Dominican Republic

- Leagues: Liga Nacional de Baloncesto
- Founded: 2005
- History: Constituyentes de San Cristóbal (2005–2009); Titanes del Distrito Nacional (2009–2012, 2018–present); Titanes del Licey (2012–2018)
- Arena: Centro Olímpico Juan Pablo Duarte (capacity: 4.500)
- Location: (Dominican Republic) Santo Domingo
- Team colors: Light blue, white, orange, blue

Titanes del Sur is a professional basketball team based in San Cristobal, Dominican Republic. The team currently plays in Dominican top division Liga Nacional de Baloncesto.

== Championships ==
Liga Nacional de Baloncesto (2x)
2008,2024
