= Reales de La Vega =

- Leagues: Liga Nacional de Baloncesto
- Founded: 2005
- Location: (Dominican Republic) La Vega Province
- Team colors: Orange, black, white
Home	Away

Reales de La Vega is a professional basketball team based in La Vega Province, Dominican Republic. The team currently plays in the Dominican top division, Liga Nacional de Baloncesto.

== Championships ==
Liga Nacional de Baloncesto (3x)
2005, 2018, 2023

== Notable players ==
To appear in this section a player must have either:
- Set a club record or won an individual award as a professional player.
- Played at least one official international match for his senior national team at any time.

- (Dominican Republic) Gelvis Solano
- (Dominican Republic) Rigoberto Mendoza
