= Spartans Distrito Capital =

- League: Venezuelan SuperLiga
- Founded: 27 May 2019; 6 years ago
- History: Spartans Distrito Capital; 2019–present
- Arena: Gimnasio José Joaquín "Papá" Carrillo
- Capacity: 5,825
- Location: Caracas, Venezuela
- Team colors: Black and Neon Green
- President: Leonel García
- Head coach: Manuel Berroterán
- Championships: 1 (2020)
- Website: spartansdc.com

Spartans Distrito Capital, also known as Spartans DC, is a Venezuelan basketball club based in Caracas. The team plays in the Venezuelan SuperLiga, the premier national basketball league and won its first championship in 2020.

== History ==
The Spartans Distrito Capital club was founded in May 2019 in order to "promote the development of Venezuelan basketball at all levels". The club began its activities at the Pedagogical institute of Caracas but later moved to the Gimnasio José Beracasa. On October 1, 2020, the Spartans were announced as one of the 16 teams to play in the SuperLiga. The team won the inaugural season, capturing their first national title behind league MVP Pedro Chourio.

== Honours ==
Venezuelan SuperLiga

- Champions (1): 2020

== Players ==
=== Current roster ===
Spartans Distrito Capital roster
Players
Coaches

Pos.	No.	Nat.	Name	Ht.	Age
G	1	(Dominican Republic)	Suero, Juan Miguel	1.95 m (6 ft 5 in)	32 – 11 May 1993
PG	4	(Venezuela)	Urbina, Kender	1.90 m (6 ft 3 in)
C	6	(Venezuela)	Graterol, Windi	2.04 m (6 ft 8 in)
SF	8	(Venezuela)	Centeno, Elian	2.00 m (6 ft 7 in)
PG	9	(Venezuela)	Chourio, Pedro	1.86 m (6 ft 1 in)
C	12	(Venezuela)	Montaño, Eliezer	2.06 m (6 ft 9 in)
G	13	(Venezuela)	Morillo, Alexander	1.80 m (5 ft 11 in)	34 – 7 January 1992
C	15	(Venezuela)	Rodríguez, José	2.05 m (6 ft 9 in)
SG	17	(Venezuela)	Acosta, Richarson	1.93 m (6 ft 4 in)
SG	20	(Venezuela)	Sifontes, Yohanner	1.94 m (6 ft 4 in)
SF	24	(Venezuela)	Carrera, Michael	1.96 m (6 ft 5 in)
SF	25	(United States) (Dominican Republic)	Henriquez, Adonys	1.98 m (6 ft 6 in)
SF	33	(Venezuela)	Zambrano, Melvin	2.01 m (6 ft 7 in)
SF	77	(Venezuela)	Palacios, Nelson	1.98 m (6 ft 6 in)

Head coach

- (Venezuela) Manuel Berroterán

Assistant coach(es)

- (Venezuela) Diego Vasquez

Legend

- (C) Team captain
- Injured

- Roster
Updated: March 10, 2026

== Notable players ==
To appear in this section a player must have either:

- Set a club record or won an individual award as a professional player.
- Played at least one official international match for his senior national team or one NBA game at any time.

=== Imports ===
- (United States) Jalen Jones (2024)
