= Metros de Santiago =

Dominican professional basketball team

- League: Liga Nacional de Baloncesto
- Founded: 2005
- Arena: Gran Arena del Cibao
- Capacity: 8,768
- Location: Santiago de los Caballeros, Dominican Republic
- Team colors: yellow, navy, white
- Main sponsor: Ferretería Bellon
- Head coach: David Diaz
- Ownership: Mícalo Bermúdez
- Championships: 5 (2006, 2007, 2014, 2015, 2017)

Metros de Santiago is a professional basketball team based in Santiago de los Caballeros, Santiago, Dominican Republic. The team currently plays in the Dominican top division Liga Nacional de Baloncesto.

== Championships ==
Liga Nacional de Baloncesto (5x)
2006, 2007, 2014, 2015, 2017

== Notable players ==
Note: Flags indicate national team eligibility at FIBA-sanctioned events. Players may hold other non-FIBA nationalities not displayed.

Criteria

To appear in this section a player must have either:

- Set a club record or won an individual award while at the club
- Played at least one official international match for their national team at any time
- Played at least one official NBA match at any time.

- (Dominican Republic) Adris De León
- (Dominican Republic) Victor Liz
- (Dominican Republic) Robert Glenn
- (Dominican Republic) Orlando Sanchez
- (Dominican Republic) Eloy Vargas
- (Nigeria) Jeleel Akindele
- (Puerto Rico) Peter John Ramos
- (United States) Kyler Edwards
