= Leones de Santo Domingo =

- Leagues: Liga Nacional de Baloncesto
- Founded: 2005
- History: Panteras del Distrito Nacional (2005–2009); Leones de Santo Domingo (2010–present)
- Arena: Centro Olímpico Juan Pablo Duarte
- Capacity: 4,500
- Location: Santo Domingo, Dominican Republic
- Team colors: Red, white
- President: Eduardo Najri
- Championships: 3 (2011, 2016, 2021)

Leones de Santo Domingo is a professional basketball team based in Santo Domingo, Dominican Republic. The team currently plays in Dominican top division Liga Nacional de Baloncesto. The Leones are three-times LNB champions, in 2011, 2016 and 2021.

== Championships ==
Liga Nacional de Baloncesto

- Champions (3): 2011, 2016, 2021

== Notable players ==
- (Dominican Republic) (United States) L. J. Figueroa
