= Soles de Santo Domingo Este =

Basketball team in the Dominican Republic

- Leagues: Liga Nacional de Baloncesto
- Founded: 2005; 20 years ago
- History: Cocolos de San Pedro de Macorís (2005–2013); Soles de Santo Domingo Este (2014–present)
- Arena: Polideportivo de Los Mina
- Location: Santo Domingo Este
- Team colors: Green, white, black
- President: Pedro Chalas
- Ownership: Pedro Chalas

Soles de Santo Domingo Este is a professional basketball team based in Santo Domingo Este, Santo Domingo, Dominican Republic. The team currently plays in Dominican top division Liga Nacional de Baloncesto. The team was formerly known as Cocolos de San Pedro de Macorís and changed names and location upon new ownership.
