= Cañeros del Este =

Basketball team based in La Romana Province, Dominican Republic

- Leagues: Liga Nacional de Baloncesto
- Founded: 2005
- History: Cañeros de La Romana (2005-2010); Cañeros del Este (2011-present)
- Arena: Polideportivo Eleoncio Mercedes (capacity: 4.000)
- Location: (Dominican Republic) La Romana
- Team colors: Orange, white, blue
- Main sponsor: Grupo Puntacana
- Championships: 2 (2010, 2012)

Cañeros del Este is a professional basketball team based in La Romana, La Romana Province, Dominican Republic. The team currently plays in the Dominican top division Liga Nacional de Baloncesto.

== Championships ==
Liga Nacional de Baloncesto (2x)
2010, 2012

== Notable players ==
- J'Covan Brown
- Brandone Francis
