= Endeavor (non-profit) =

Non-profit organization in the USA

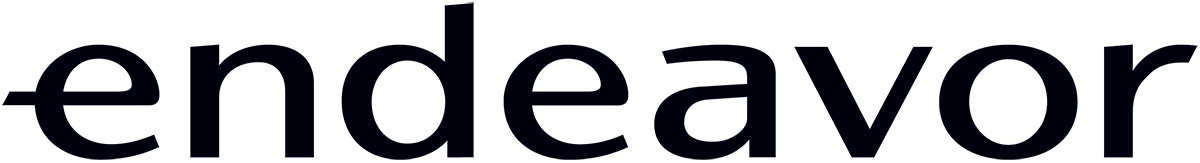
- Type: Non-profit
- Founded: 1997
- Founders: Linda Rottenberg and Peter Kellner
- Headquarters: New York City, New York, United States
- Area served: 40+ affiliate offices in Latin America, the Middle East, Southeast Asia, Africa, and Europe
- Key people: Linda Rottenberg (CEO); Edgar Bronfman Jr. (chairman); Adrian Garcia-Aranyos (president); Eduardo Elsztain (Global Advisory Board)
- Revenue: 10,759,332 United States dollar (2016)
- Total assets: 22,667,622 United States dollar (2022)
- Number of employees: 500+ worldwide
- Website: endeavor.org

Endeavor is an American organization headquartered in New York City which supports entrepreneurs with potential for economic and social impact in their regions. The organization provides the entrepreneurs in its network with services that assist them in growing ventures, creating jobs, transforming economies, and supporting future generations of entrepreneurs.

== History ==
Founded in 1997, Endeavor has supported over 50,000 candidates and selected over 2,000 entrepreneurs from 1,200 companies. Endeavor began in Argentina, where Linda Rottenberg and Peter Kellner opened its first office in Buenos Aires. The organization grew out of conversations between Rottenberg and a group of Argentine businesspeople, among them Eduardo Elsztain of IRSA. Elsztain provided US$200,000 in initial funding for the Argentine chapter and became chairman of its board.

Supported and mentored by a network of more than 3,500 local and global business leaders, these entrepreneurs have created over 650,000 jobs and generated $10 billion in revenues in 2016. In 2001, Endeavor launched Endeavor Mexico and Time magazine recognized Endeavor's founders as among the "Top 100 Innovators for the 21st Century" in its November 5, 2001, issue.

In 2002, the Schwab Foundation and the World Economic Forum endorsed Endeavor as one of 40 leading examples of social entrepreneurship worldwide. In 2007, MercadoLibre became Endeavor's first company to complete a US IPO, listing on the NASDAQ under the symbol MELI.

In 2008, Wences Casares, one of the first Endeavor entrepreneurs, joined its board of directors. In 2009, Endeavor co-founder Linda Rottenberg co-chairs the World Economic Forum on the Middle East, in Egypt. In the same year, Endeavor received a commitment of $10 million from the Omidyar Network. Also in 2009, Endeavor launched its Mentor Capital Program, Global 25 Program, Endeavor Jordan, and Endeavor's Center for High-Impact Entrepreneurship research arm.

== Evaluation ==
As of August 2023, Charity Navigator rates Endeavor as 3 out of 4 stars.

== Notable Endeavour Entrepreneurs ==
- Olugbenga Agboola of Flutterwave
- Pierpaolo Barbieri of Ualá
- Simón Borrero and Sebastián Mejia of Rappi
- Wences Casares of Xapo Bank
- Marcos Galperin of Mercado Libre
- Carlos García Ottati of Kavak
- Martín Migoya and Guibert Englebienne of Globant
- Guillaume Pousaz of Checkout.com
- David Vélez of Nubank
- Achmad Zaky of Bukalapak
