= Manu Ginóbili =

Argentine basketball player (born 1977)

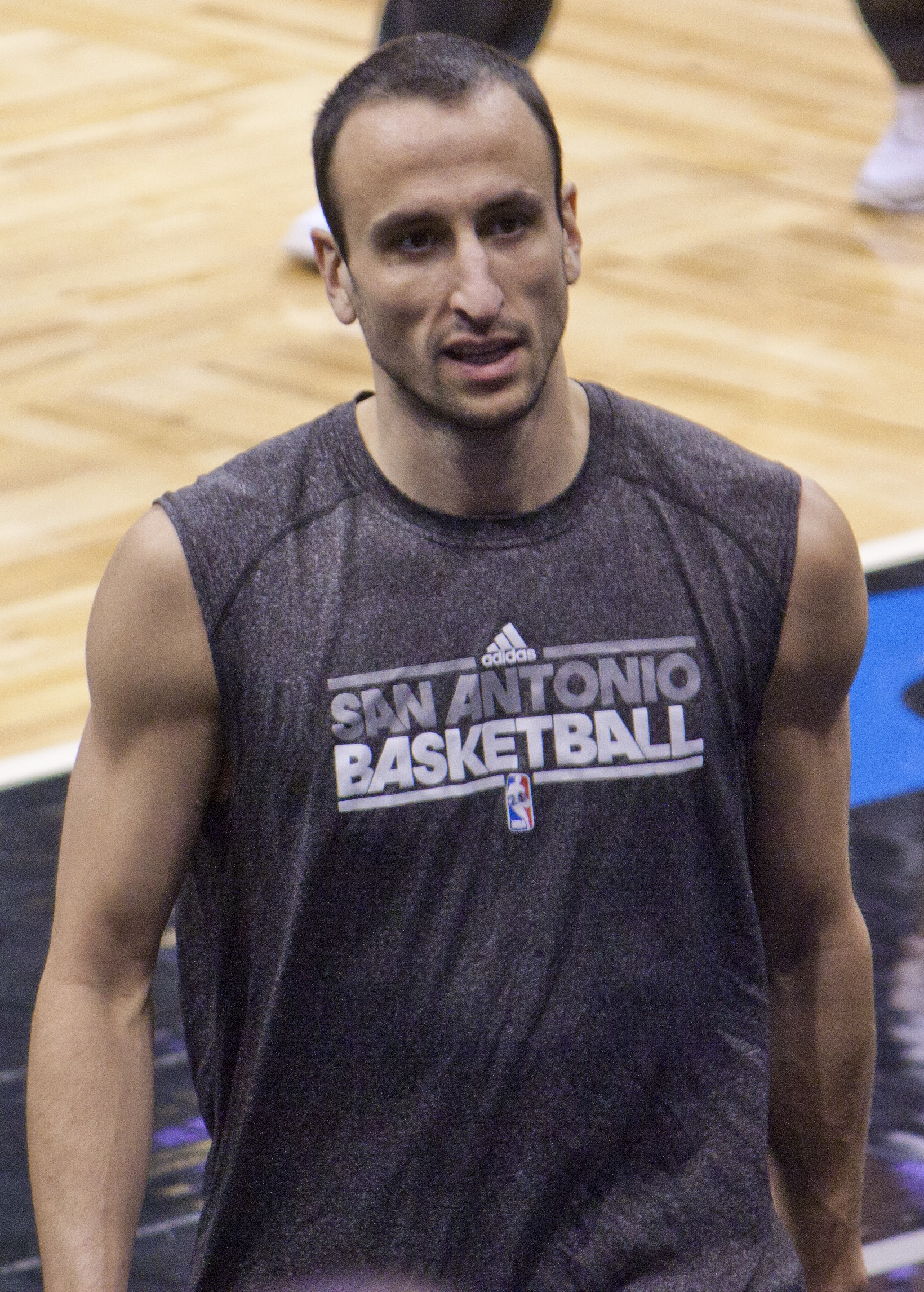
- Ginóbili with the San Antonio Spurs in 2010

San Antonio Spurs
- Title: Special advisor
- League: NBA

Personal information
- Born: 28 July 1977 (age 49) Bahía Blanca, Argentina
- Listed height: 6 ft 6 in (1.98 m)
- Listed weight: 205 lb (93 kg)

Career information
- NBA draft: 1999: 2nd round, 57th overall pick
- Drafted by: San Antonio Spurs
- Playing career: 1995–2018
- Position: Shooting guard / small forward
- Number: 20, 10, 6, 5

Career history
- 1995–1996: Andino de La Rioja
- 1996–1998: Estudiantes de Bahía Blanca
- 1998–2000: Viola Reggio Calabria
- 2000–2002: Virtus Bologna
- 2002–2018: San Antonio Spurs

Career highlights
- 4× NBA champion (2003, 2005, 2007, 2014); 2× NBA All-Star (2005, 2011); 2× All-NBA Third Team (2008, 2011); NBA Sixth Man of the Year (2008); NBA All-Rookie Second Team (2003); No. 20 retired by San Antonio Spurs; Argentina's No. 5 retired by the CABB; EuroLeague 25th Anniversary Team (2025); EuroLeague champion (2001); EuroLeague Finals MVP (2001); All-EuroLeague First Team (2002); EuroLeague steals leader (2002); Italian League champion (2001); 2× Italian Cup winner (2001, 2002); 2× Italian League MVP (2001, 2002); Italian Cup MVP (2002); Italian League steals leader (2002); 3× Italian League All-Star (1999–2001); Italian League All-Star Game Dunk Contest Champion (2001); FIBA AmeriCup MVP (2001); Olympics MVP (2004); 2× Olimpia de Oro (2003, 2004); Diamond Konex Award (2010); 50 Greatest EuroLeague Contributors (2008); EuroLeague 25th Anniversary Team (2025)

Career NBA statistics
- Points: 14,043 (13.3 ppg)
- Rebounds: 3,697 (3.5 rpg)
- Assists: 4,001 (3.8 apg)
- Stats at NBA.com
- Stats at Basketball Reference
- Basketball Hall of Fame
Medals
Men's basketball
Representing Argentina
Summer Olympics
Gold medal – first place	2004 Athens
Bronze medal – third place	2008 Beijing
FIBA World Cup
Silver medal – second place	2002 Indianapolis
FIBA Diamond Ball
Bronze medal – third place	2004 Belgrade
Gold medal – first place	2008 Nanjing
FIBA AmeriCup
Bronze medal – third place	1999 San Juan
Gold medal – first place	2001 Neuquén
Silver medal – second place	2003 San Juan
Gold medal – first place	2011 Mar del Plata
FIBA South American Championship
Silver medal – second place	1999 Bahía Blanca

Emanuel David "Manu" Ginóbili Maccari (English: /ˈmænuː dʒɪˈnoʊbli/ MAN-oo jin-OH-blee, Spanish: [ˈmanu ʝiˈnoβili]; born 28 July 1977) is an Argentine former professional basketball player. During a 23-year professional career, Ginóbili played in Argentina, in Italy, and in the NBA; he also represented Argentina in international competition. A shooting guard, he is best known for playing for the San Antonio Spurs of the NBA from 2002 to 2018. Ginóbili, Tim Duncan, and Tony Parker became known as the Spurs' "Big Three"; together, the trio won four NBA championships. In April 2022, Ginóbili was announced as a first-ballot inductee into the Naismith Memorial Basketball Hall of Fame.

Coming from a family of professional basketball players, Ginóbili spent the early part of his career in Argentina and Italy, winning several individual and team honors. Ginóbili's stint with Italian club Kinder Bologna was particularly successful, as he won two Italian League MVP awards, the EuroLeague Finals MVP, the 2001 EuroLeague championship and the Triple Crown. After joining the San Antonio Spurs, Ginóbili was named an All-Star in 2005 and 2011 and was selected to the All-NBA Third Team twice. In the 2007–08 season, he was named the NBA Sixth Man of the Year. The Spurs made the playoffs in each of Ginóbili's 16 seasons. He is regarded as one of the greatest Latin American players, sixth men, and draft steals in NBA history. Ginóbili is also credited with popularizing the Euro step move in the NBA.

In international play, Ginóbili's achievements include leading Argentina to a gold medal at the 2004 Summer Olympics, where he was named FIBA Olympics Most Valuable Player. He also helped secure the historic feat of being a member of the only team in Olympic history (as of 2025) to ever eliminate the United States men's national basketball team since NBA players are allowed to participate (i.e. 1992). With Argentina's 2004 gold medal victory, Ginóbili became one of only two players (along with fellow Hall of Famer Bill Bradley) to have won a EuroLeague title, an NBA championship, and an Olympic gold medal.

In September 2021, the Spurs appointed Ginóbili as special advisor to basketball operations.

== Family and personal life ==
Emanuel David Ginóbili was born on the 28th of July 1977 in Bahía Blanca, a city in the southwest region of the Buenos Aires Province, Argentina, to Jorge Hector Ginóbili and Raquel Maccari. Ginóbili comes from a family of basketball players: Jorge was a coach at Bahiense del Norte, a local basketball club, where Ginóbili learned to play the sport, whereas his older brothers, Leandro and Sebastián, are both former professional players; Leonardo played seven years in the Liga Nacional de Básquetbol before retiring in 2003, and Sebastián has played in both the Argentine local league and in the Spanish 2nd-tier level, Liga Española de Baloncesto.

Ginóbili is of Italian descent, tracing his heritage to the region of Marche. He has both Argentine citizenship and Italian citizenship. In addition to his native Spanish, Ginóbili is fluent in English and Italian. In his spare time, Ginóbili enjoys listening to Latin music, watching movies, and traveling. He also enjoys cycling and playing tennis. Ginóbili's idol growing up was Michael Jordan.

In 2004, Ginobili married fellow Argentine Marianela Oroño. On 16 May 2010, his wife gave birth to twin boys, Dante and Nicola. On 21 April 2014, she gave birth to their third son, Luca.

A documentary based on Ginobili's life was directed by Rodolfo Lamboglia.

== Professional career ==
=== Andino (1995–1996) ===
Ginóbili made his professional debut in the Argentine basketball league for the Andino Sport Club of La Rioja in the 1995–96 season.

=== Estudiantes de Bahía Blanca (1996–1998) ===
Ginóbili was traded to Estudiantes de Bahía Blanca in 1996. He played with his hometown team until 1998.

=== Viola Reggio Calabria (1998–2000) ===
Ginóbili went to Europe to spend the 1998–99 and 1999–2000 seasons with Italian team Basket Viola Reggio Calabria. In 1999, he teamed with Brent Scott, Brian Oliver and Sydney Johnson to earn promotion from the Italian 2nd Division to the Italian 1st Division.

=== Virtus Bologna (2000–2002) ===
Ginóbili then entered the 1999 NBA draft and the San Antonio Spurs selected him late in the second round with the 57th overall pick. However, Ginóbili did not sign with the Spurs at this point. Instead, he returned to Italy to play for Kinder Bologna, whom he helped win the 2001 Italian League Championship, the 2001 and 2002 Italian Cups, and the 2001 EuroLeague. In the lattermost, Ginóbili was named the 2001 EuroLeague's Finals MVP. He was also named the Italian League MVP in 2000–01 and 2001–02, and made the Italian League's All-Star Game three times during this period.

While playing with the Argentina national team at the 2002 FIBA World Championship in Indianapolis, Ginóbili made the All-Tournament Team, alongside future NBA star Yao Ming and established NBA stars Dirk Nowitzki and Peja Stojaković, and helped lead Argentina to a second-place finish.

=== San Antonio Spurs (2002–2018) ===
==== Early NBA career and first championship (2002–2004) ====
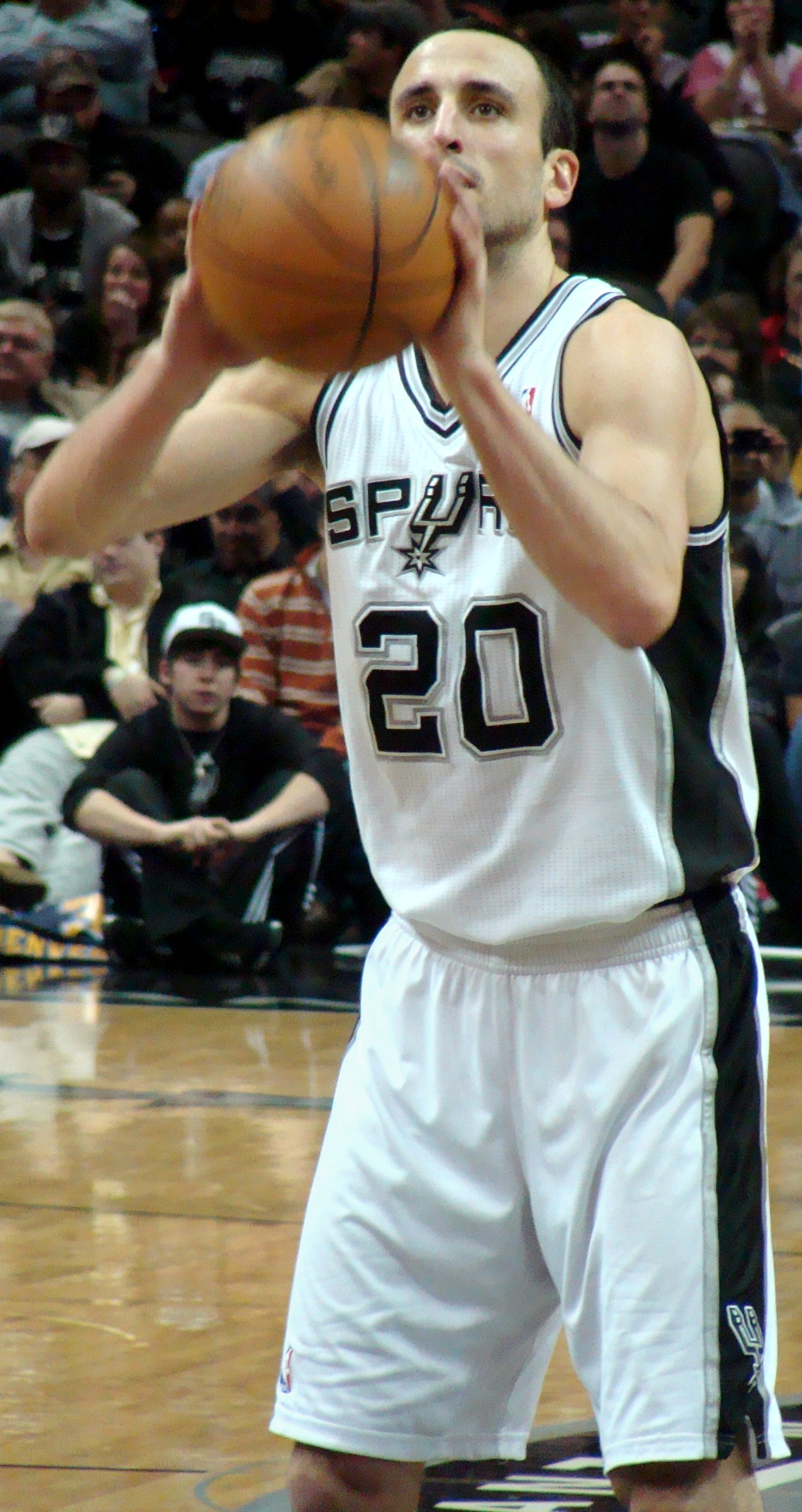
Ginóbili was drafted by the Spurs as the 57th pick (second to last) in the 1999 NBA draft.

Ginóbili joined the Spurs for the 2002–03 NBA season, where he played backup for veteran guard Steve Smith. Ginóbili spent much of the early season injured, and found it hard to adjust to the NBA's style of play. As his injury improved, so did Ginóbili, winning the Western Conference Rookie of the Month in March, and being named to the All-Rookie Second Team at the end of the season. Still, he only started in five games as the Spurs chalked up a 60–22 regular season win–loss record. The Spurs then entered the playoffs eager to upend the defending champions Los Angeles Lakers, at which point Ginóbili rose to prominence.

I told Timmy, 'This guy is coming, and nobody in the U.S. knows how good he is.' And Timmy gave me that whole raised eyebrow thing he does.

— Gregg Popovich

In contrast to his regular season, Ginóbili became an integral part of Gregg Popovich's rotation in the playoffs, playing in every game. The Spurs eliminated Phoenix and Los Angeles and in those games, Ginóbili's scoring threat took opponents by surprise, giving them one more thing to cope with against the now highly favored Spurs. He helped guide them past the Dallas Mavericks in the Western Conference Finals and then the New Jersey Nets in the Finals, securing San Antonio's second championship. After the win, Ginóbili won his first Olimpia de Oro ("Golden Olympia") as Argentina's sportsperson of the year, and met Argentine president Néstor Kirchner. A gym in Bahía Blanca was also dedicated in Ginóbili's honor.

In the 2003–04 season, the Spurs began featuring Ginóbili more prominently, starting him in half of the 77 regular season games in which he played. Ginóbili's statistics improved in all major categories, as he averaged 12.8 points, 4.5 rebounds, 3.8 assists and 1.8 steals per game. During the 2004 playoffs, the Spurs lost again to the Los Angeles Lakers in the Western Conference Semifinals. Following Game 5 where Derek Fisher scored a buzzer-beating jump shot, the Spurs lost Game 6 and the series 4–2. While Ginóbili did not start in a single playoff game as he did in 2003, his playoff statistics improved significantly, with 13.0 points, 5.3 rebounds, and 3.1 assists per game.

==== Peak years: second and third championships (2004–2011) ====
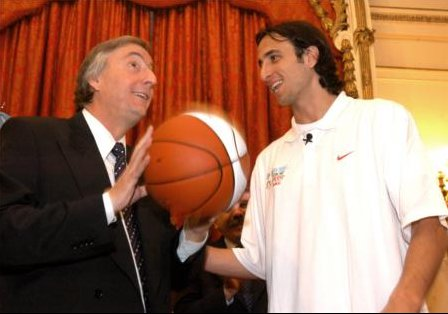
Ginóbili met then-President of Argentina Néstor Kirchner following the 2005 NBA Finals.

After some initial issues with San Antonio over his contract, Ginóbili re-signed on a 6-year, $52 million contract with the Spurs and started every game during the 2004–05 season. This was his best season yet as he was selected as a reserve by NBA coaches to the 2005 Western Conference All-Star team, marking his debut in the elite mid-season showcase. During the playoffs, Ginóbili's play was pivotal to winning San Antonio's third championship. The Spurs first defeated Phoenix 4–1 in the Conference Finals, before prevailing in a very defense-oriented seven-game series against the Detroit Pistons. Ginóbili recorded career-highs in his playoff numbers, most notably 20.8 ppg and 5.8 rpg, and had the third-highest point total in the entire playoffs. In the NBA Finals MVP Award voting he came in second to Tim Duncan. The former finished the 2004–05 season as the second-leading scorer on the team. During the season, Ginóbili became only the fourth person to win consecutive Olimpia de Oro, this time sharing the award with soccer star Carlos Tevez.

The 2005–06 season was an injury-plagued one for Ginóbili, who suffered foot and ankle injuries that hindered his ability to play. Ginóbili managed 65 games in the regular season, but saw a dip in major statistics as compared to the previous season. During the playoffs, he returned to form, but was unable to prevent the Spurs from being eliminated by the Dallas Mavericks in the Conference Semifinals.

In the 2006–07 season, the Spurs lacked energy from their reserves. Ginóbili came off the bench for most of the second half of the season, helping the Spurs attain the league's best record during that portion of the season. Ginóbili produced numbers closely identical to his successful 2004–05 campaign despite starting in only 36 of 75 games, his second-lowest number of starts since arriving at San Antonio. The 2007 NBA Playoffs saw him help the Spurs to defeat the Denver Nuggets, Phoenix Suns and Utah Jazz; the team then swept the Cleveland Cavaliers for Ginobili's third and San Antonio's fourth championship.

Ginóbili was to play an even bigger role for the Spurs the following season, reaching career high averages in points, rebounds, assists, and three-point field goal percentage. On 11 February 2008, he scored 34 points and recorded 15 rebounds in a 93–88 win over the Toronto Raptors, becoming the first guard in Spurs' history to have at least 15 points and 15 rebounds in a game. On 21 April 2008, the NBA announced that Ginóbili had won the 2008 Sixth Man Award, winning 123 out of the 124 first place votes. He had a statline of 19.5 points, 4.5 assists, and 4.8 rebounds on .460 shooting averaging 31.1 minutes. Only a couple of weeks later, the Argentine was also named to the All-NBA Third Team. In the playoffs, the Spurs defeated the Suns 4–1 in the first round, and Ginóbili was moved to the starting lineup in the second round against the New Orleans Hornets after the Spurs lost the first two road games. San Antonio eventually prevailed in seven games, the Argentine played another strong series, leading the Spurs in points and assists per game (21.3 and 6.0 respectively). However, San Antonio lost to arch-rivals Los Angeles Lakers in the Conference Finals in five games, and once again failed to capture back-to-back NBA championships.

The following season, Ginóbili was injured for most of the campaign, managing only 44 regular-season games and missing the 2009 NBA Playoffs entirely. San Antonio qualified for the playoffs as the third seed with a 54–28 record, but with an aging supporting cast (Bowen, Michael Finley and Kurt Thomas were all in their late 30s), the Spurs were only considered fringe contenders for the championship. As it turned out, the strong play of Duncan and Tony Parker were not enough to help the Spurs avoid a 4–1 defeat by Dallas, and the Spurs were eliminated in the first round of the playoffs for the first time since 2000.

On 31 October 2009, in a game against the Sacramento Kings, a bat descended onto the court at the AT&T Center, causing a stoppage of play. As the bat flew past, Ginóbili swatted the bat to the ground with his hand. He then carried the creature off the court, earning the applause of the crowd. On 9 April 2010, the Spurs and Ginóbili agreed to a three-year, $39 million contract extension through the 2012–13 season.

In 2010–11, Ginobili was regarded as the key player on his team, and he finished eighth on the NBA MVP ballot following the season. Ginobili was injured in the last game of the regular season. Despite the injury, he averaged 20.6 points and 4.2 assists during the team's first-round series against Memphis Grizzlies; however, the Spurs lost the series in six games. Ginóbili was named an NBA All-Star for the second time in his career and also was named to the All-NBA third team.

==== Later career (2011–2018) ====
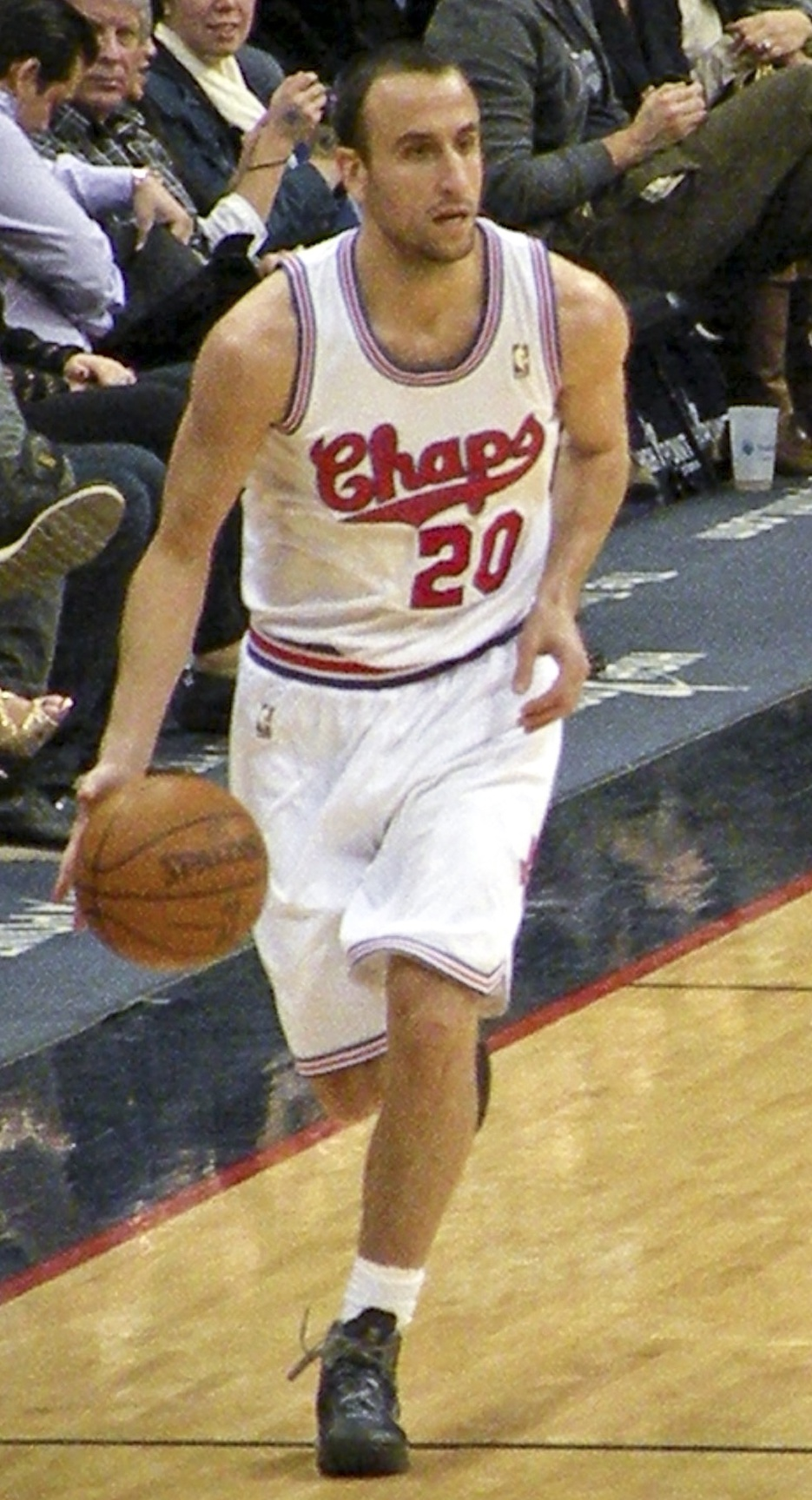
Ginóbili in 2012

In the lockout-shortened 2011–12 season, Ginóbili helped the Spurs go 50–16. The team advanced to the Western Conference Finals, where they were defeated 4–2 by the Oklahoma City Thunder. In Game 5 of the series, Ginóbili scored 34 points.

In 2012–13, the Spurs advanced to the NBA Finals, where they faced the Miami Heat. In the Spurs' Game 5 victory, Ginóbili scored a season-high 24 points and helped his team take a 3–2 series lead. However, the Spurs went on to lose Games 6 and 7.

On 11 July 2013, Ginóbili re-signed with the Spurs on a two-year, $14 million deal. In 2013–14, the Spurs had a league-best 62–20 record. Ginóbili finished third in the voting for Sixth Man of the Year. In Game 1 of the Western Conference Finals against the Thunder, the Big Three of Duncan, Parker, and Ginóbili notched their 110th career playoff win, matching the number of playoff wins attained by Magic Johnson, Kareem Abdul-Jabbar and Michael Cooper of the Los Angeles Lakers. The Spurs reached the NBA Finals again, where they faced the Heat for the second consecutive year. This time, they dominated the series, winning 4–1 to claim that franchise's fifth championship; Ginóbili won his fourth championship as a Spur.

On 20 July 2015, Ginóbili re-signed with the Spurs on a two-year, $5.7 million deal. On 14 January 2016, in a win over the Cleveland Cavaliers, he played his 900th NBA game, all with the Spurs. On 4 February, Ginóbili underwent surgery after suffering a testicular injury in the Spurs' win over the New Orleans Pelicans the previous night. He was subsequently sidelined for one month. He returned to the action on 5 March after missing 12 games with the injury, scoring 22 points in 15 minutes against the Sacramento Kings.

On 14 July 2016, Ginóbili re-signed with the Spurs on a one-year, $14 million deal. On 9 November, in a loss to the Houston Rockets, Ginóbili became the 15th second-rounder to reach 13,000 points and joined Rashard Lewis as the only second-round draft picks in NBA history with 13,000 career points and at least 1,300 three-pointers.

In Game 5 of the 2017 Western Conference Semifinals against Houston, Ginóbili blocked James Harden's shot in the closing seconds to help San Antonio to a 110–107 victory. In Game 3 of the Western Conference Finals against Golden State Warriors, Ginóbili became the first player at the age of 39 to score 20 or more points off the bench in a playoff game since the NBA began recording starts in the 1970–71 NBA season.

On 24 August 2017, Ginóbili re-signed with the Spurs on a two-year, $5 million deal. In January 2018, he became the only player in NBA history to have multiple 20-point games off the bench at age 40 or older. Ginóbili also became the first player in his 40s to score 15-plus points in back-to-back games since Michael Jordan in 2002–03. On 28 January against the Sacramento Kings, Ginóbili and Vince Carter scored 21 and 15 points respectively; it was the first game in NBA history where two players over the age of 40 scored 15 points or more. On 29 March, in a 103–99 victory over the Thunder, Ginobili became the Spurs' career leader in steals, passing David Robinson (1,388) for the franchise record. In Game 4 of the Spurs' first round playoff series against the Warriors, Ginóbili played in his 217th playoff game, breaking a tie with Shaquille O'Neal for sixth in league history. Ginóbili also passed Reggie Miller for third in career 3-pointers in playoff history. The Spurs lost to the Warriors in five games.

=== Retirement ===
On 27 August 2018, Ginóbili announced his retirement from professional basketball, making him the second player that season to complete a career with one team, after Nick Collison of the Oklahoma City Thunder. On 28 March 2019, the Spurs retired Ginóbili's No. 20 jersey.

== Career statistics ==
Source: Basketball Reference.

=== NBA ===
Legend
GP	Games played	GS	Games started	MPG	Minutes per game
FG%	Field goal percentage	3P%	3-point field goal percentage	FT%	Free throw percentage
RPG	Rebounds per game	APG	Assists per game	SPG	Steals per game
BPG	Blocks per game	PPG	Points per game	**Bold**	Career high
†	Won an NBA championship

==== Regular season ====
Year	Team	GP	GS	MPG	FG%	3P%	FT%	RPG	APG	SPG	BPG	PPG
2002–03†	San Antonio	69	5	20.7	.438	.345	.737	2.3	2.0	1.4	.2	7.6
2003–04	San Antonio	77	38	29.4	.418	.359	.802	4.5	3.8	**1.8**	.2	12.8
2004–05†	San Antonio	74	74	29.6	.471	.376	.803	4.4	3.9	1.6	**.4**	16.0
2005–06	San Antonio	65	56	27.9	.462	.382	.778	3.5	3.6	1.6	**.4**	15.1
2006–07†	San Antonio	75	36	27.5	.464	.396	.860	4.4	3.5	1.5	**.4**	16.5
2007–08	San Antonio	74	23	**31.0**	.460	.401	.860	**4.8**	4.5	1.5	**.4**	**19.5**
2008–09	San Antonio	44	7	26.8	.454	.330	**.884**	4.5	3.6	1.5	**.4**	15.5
2009–10	San Antonio	75	21	28.7	.441	.377	.870	3.8	**4.9**	1.4	.3	16.5
2010–11	San Antonio	**80**	**79**	30.3	.433	.349	.871	3.7	**4.9**	1.5	**.4**	17.4
2011–12	San Antonio	34	7	23.3	**.526**	**.413**	.871	3.4	4.4	.7	**.4**	12.9
2012–13	San Antonio	60	0	23.2	.425	.353	.796	3.4	4.6	1.3	.2	11.8
2013–14†	San Antonio	68	3	22.8	.469	.349	.851	3.0	4.3	1.0	.3	12.3
2014–15	San Antonio	70	0	22.7	.426	.345	.721	3.0	4.2	1.0	.3	10.5
2015–16	San Antonio	58	0	19.6	.453	.391	.813	2.5	3.1	1.1	.2	9.6
2016–17	San Antonio	69	0	18.7	.390	.392	.804	2.3	2.7	1.2	.2	7.5
2017–18	San Antonio	65	0	20.0	.434	.333	.840	2.2	2.5	.7	.2	8.9
Career		1,057	349	25.4	.447	.369	.827	3.5	3.8	1.3	.3	13.3
All-Star		2	0	21.0	.385	.000	.833	3.0	3.0	2.0	.5	7.5

==== Playoffs ====
Year	Team	GP	GS	MPG	FG%	3P%	FT%	RPG	APG	SPG	BPG	PPG
2003†	San Antonio	**24**	0	27.5	.386	.384	.757	3.8	2.9	1.7	.4	9.4
2004	San Antonio	10	0	28.0	.447	.286	.818	5.3	3.1	1.7	.1	13.0
2005†	San Antonio	23	**15**	33.6	**.507**	**.438**	.795	**5.8**	4.2	1.2	.3	**20.8**
2006	San Antonio	13	11	32.8	.484	.333	.839	4.5	3.0	1.5	.5	18.4
2007†	San Antonio	20	0	30.1	.401	.384	.836	5.5	3.7	1.7	.2	16.7
2008	San Antonio	17	6	32.9	.422	.373	**.896**	3.8	3.9	.6	.3	17.8
2010	San Antonio	10	10	**35.2**	.414	.333	.866	3.7	**6.0**	**2.6**	.2	19.4
2011	San Antonio	5	5	34.8	.443	.321	.780	4.0	4.2	**2.6**	.6	20.6
2012	San Antonio	14	2	27.9	.448	.338	.857	3.5	4.0	.7	.3	14.4
2013	San Antonio	21	3	26.7	.399	.302	.738	3.7	5.0	1.1	.3	11.5
2014†	San Antonio	23	0	25.5	.439	.390	.862	3.3	4.1	1.6	.1	14.3
2015	San Antonio	7	0	18.7	.349	.364	.783	3.4	4.6	.6	**.9**	8.0
2016	San Antonio	10	0	19.2	.426	.429	.783	2.7	2.5	.8	.3	6.7
2017	San Antonio	16	1	17.8	.412	.225	.739	2.4	2.4	1.0	.1	6.6
2018	San Antonio	5	0	21.4	.405	.333	.818	3.0	3.2	1.4	.2	9.0
Career		218	53	27.9	.433	.358	.817	4.0	3.8	1.3	.3	14.0

=== EuroLeague ===
Legend
GP	Games played	GS	Games started	MPG	Minutes per game
FG%	Field-goal percentage	3P%	3-point field-goal percentage	FT%	Free-throw percentage
RPG	Rebounds per game	APG	Assists per game	SPG	Steals per game
BPG	Blocks per game	PPG	Points per game	PIR	Performance index rating
**Bold**	Career high

Year	Team	GP	GS	MPG	FG%	3P%	FT%	RPG	APG	SPG	BPG	PPG	PIR
2000–01†	Kinder Bologna	**22**	20	**29.7**	.445	.291	**.778**	**4.1**	2.0	**2.9**	**.3**	15.2	15.9
2001–02	Kinder Bologna	**22**	**22**	28.4	**.450**	**.340**	**.778**	3.8	**3.0**	2.5*	**.3**	**15.9**	**17.1**
Career		44	42	29.1	.448	.315	.778	4.0	2.5	2.7	.3	15.5	16.5

== National team career ==
Ginóbili was a core member of a successful Argentina national basketball team, which is sometimes referred to as the Golden Generation.

=== Junior national team ===
Ginóbili played with the junior Argentina national team at the 1997 FIBA Under-21 World Championship, where his team finished in 4th place.

=== Senior national team ===
Ginóbili was a member of the senior Argentina national basketball team, and made his senior debut during the 1998 FIBA World Championship in Athens. He also played at the 2002 FIBA World Championship, where he won a silver medal. Ginóbili's best accomplishment as a member of the national team came at the 2004 Athens Summer Olympics when he led Argentina to a gold medal as they became the first team other than Team USA to emerge as the competition's winner in 16 years. The highlight of the tournament was his game-winning buzzer beater with 0.7 seconds remaining, on the opening day of the Olympics, in a game versus Serbia and Montenegro. Ginóbili led the team in both scoring (19.3 points per game) and assists (3.3 assists per game).

Ginóbili played with Argentina at the 2006 FIBA World Championship, where his team finished in 4th place. Ginóbili was the flag bearer for Argentina at the opening ceremony of the 2008 Summer Olympics, which was held in Beijing, China. At the 2008 Beijing Summer Olympics basketball tournament, Argentina defeated Lithuania to win the bronze medal game, although the shooting guard did not play in that match, after sustaining an injury in the tournament's semifinals. In April 2010, Ginóbili announced that he would not participate in the 2010 FIBA World Championship, due to family reasons. However, he competed for the team at the 2012 London Summer Olympics, where Argentina narrowly missed out on winning the bronze medal, in the bronze medal game versus Russia. Ginóbili played his last international games at the 2016 Rio Summer Olympics, where Argentina finished in 8th place.

== Player profile ==
Ginóbili was listed as 6 ft 6 in (1.98 m) in shoes, weighed 205 lb (93 kg), and played left-handed. He established himself as a star shooting guard and became known as one of the greatest sixth men in NBA history. Ginóbili was a relatively late bloomer, entering the NBA at age 25 in a period when entering the NBA as a teenager was very common. He was known as a reliable and versatile backcourt player.

Apart from his up-tempo and aggressive style, Ginóbili was known for his clutch play and his passion for the game. Ginóbili's go-to move was either a three-pointer or a fierce drive to the basket. He often lowered his head when driving to the basket to collapse defenses and create shots or passes to his teammates. Ginobili popularized the Euro step in the NBA, although he was not the first to use the move in the league.

Ginobili was known as a team player. He accepted the Spurs coaches' decision to bring him off the bench for most of his career. He was also known for his difficult-to-defend passes, including the no-look pass. Ginobili was also willing to draw charges on defense. In 2007, he was listed by ESPN writer Thomas Neumann at No. 6 on the list of greatest floppers in NBA history. Five years later, Ian Thomsen, a Sports Illustrated columnist, grouped Ginóbili with fellow European league players Anderson Varejão and Vlade Divac as the players who "made [flopping] famous", by exaggerating contact on the court in a manner analogous to diving in soccer games.

He has a willingness to do what it takes to win, and to do it at the highest possible level of intensity, every single minute he steps on the court.

— Gregg Popovich, after the 2005 NBA Playoffs

Having traversed the major basketball continents during his career, Ginóbili is one of the few players who enjoyed success under both the physical, one-on-one play of the NBA and the more technical, jump-shooting rule set of FIBA. He is one of only two players in basketball history (along with Bill Bradley) to win the EuroLeague, an Olympic gold medal, and an NBA championship ring. Ginóbili is also the first non-U.S. player to win both the NBA championship ring and the Olympic gold medal, and the second Latin American to be selected to play in an NBA All-Star game (after Panama's Rolando Blackman). The Spurs made the NBA playoffs in each of his 16 NBA seasons.

In 2007, ESPN sportswriter John Hollinger ranked Ginóbili as the sixth-best international player then active in the NBA, describing Ginobili as "one of the great draft heists of all time" and attributing the trend of NBA teams drafting developing European players to the success of the Argentine. The following year, Ginóbili was named by ESPN as one of the best EuroLeague players to have graced the NBA.

== Honours ==
Awards

- 2× Italian League MVP: 2001, 2002
- 3× Italian League All-Star: 1999, 2000, 2001
- EuroLeague Final Four MVP: 2001
- 2× EuroLeague Finals Top Scorer: 2001, 2002
- FIBA AmeriCup MVP: 2001
- FIBA AmeriCup All-Tournament Team: 2011
- FIBA Olympics MVP: 2004
- Italian Cup MVP: 2002
- 2× FIBA World Cup All-Tournament Team: 2002, 2006
- Olimpia de Oro: 2003, 2004 (Note: The 2004 award was shared with footballer Carlos Tevez, Olympic champion that year.)
- 2× NBA All-Star: 2005, 2011
- 50 Greatest EuroLeague Contributors: 2008
- EuroLeague 25th Anniversary Team: 2025
- NBA Sixth Man of the Year Award: 2008
- Diamond Konex Award: 2010 (Note: The most important sportsman of the decade in Argentina.)
- Bleacher Report NBA Legends 100
- 2× All-NBA Third Team: 2008, 2011
- Naismith Memorial Basketball Hall of Fame Inductee: 2022

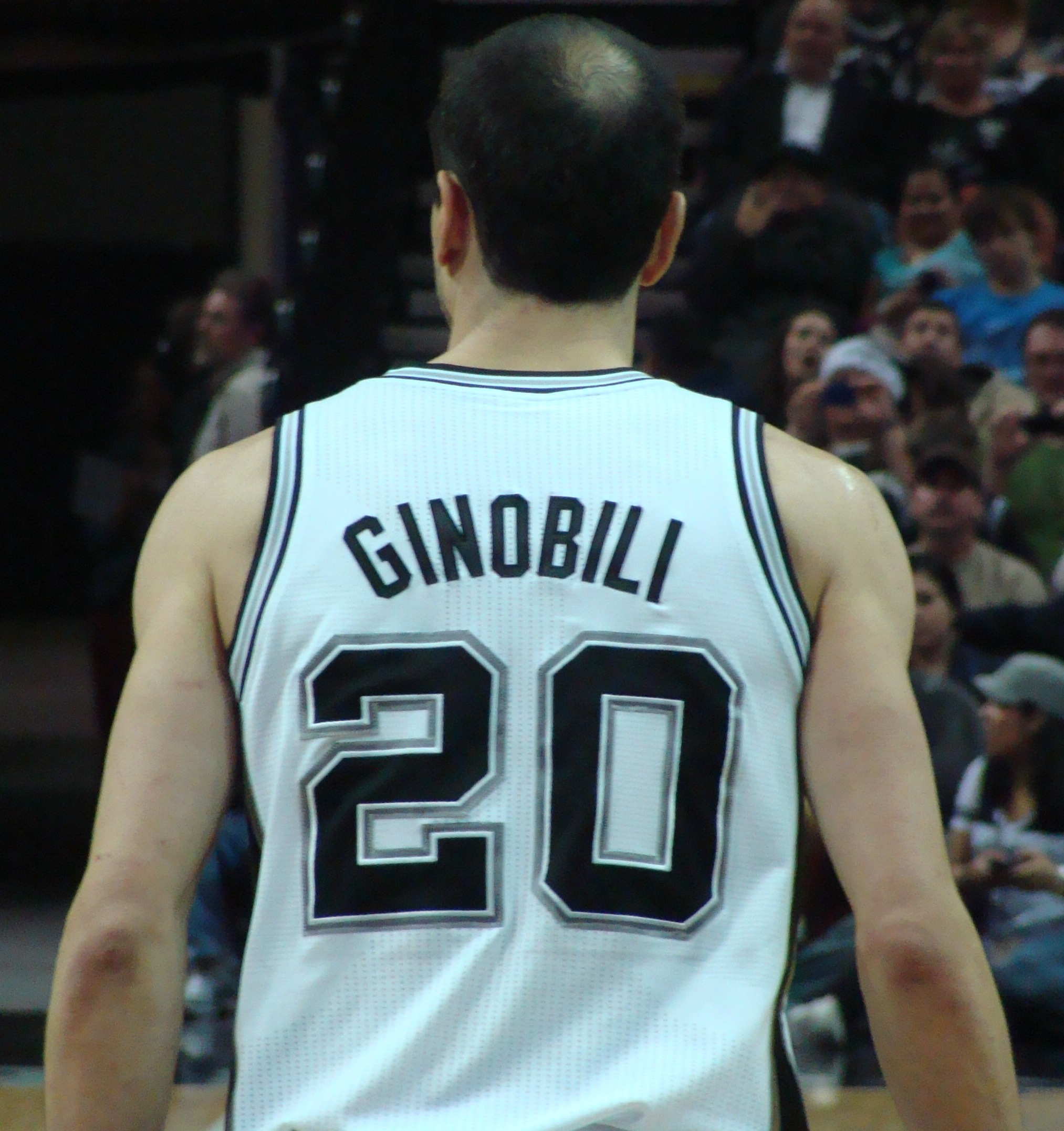
Ginóbili's No. 20 jersey was retired by the San Antonio Spurs in 2019

Titles

- Italian League champion: 2001
- 2× Italian Cup winner: 2001, 2002
- EuroLeague champion: 2001
- Triple Crown winner: 2001
- 2× FIBA AmeriCup Gold: 2001, 2011
- FIBA World Cup Silver: 2002
- 4× NBA champion: 2003, 2005, 2007, 2014
- Summer Olympic Games Gold: 2004
- Summer Olympic Games Bronze: 2008
- FIBA Diamond Ball Tournament Gold: 2008

Personal honours

- No. 20 retired by the San Antonio Spurs
- Argentina's No. 5 retired by the CABB

== Post-retirement activities ==
On 24 September 2021, the San Antonio Spurs announced that they had appointed Ginóbili as special advisor to basketball operations.

On 10 September 2022, Ginóbili became the 12th player to have played for the San Antonio Spurs franchise to be inducted into the Naismith Memorial Basketball Hall of Fame. He is one of only four Hall of Famers who played exclusively for San Antonio for their entire NBA careers (the others are George Karl, David Robinson and Tim Duncan). Former teammate Tim Duncan presented Ginóbili at the ceremony.

Since his retirement, Ginobili has remained active in the field of angel investing, mainly focusing on technology startups in Argentina and the Latin American region. Ginobili is a mentor and investor at Newtopia VC, a venture capital firm that manages around $50 million in funds.

In 2021, Ginobili joined the Argentine financial technology unicorn Ualá, founded by Pierpaolo Barbieri. Ginobili has acquired minority shares of Kavak, a used-car marketplace of Mexican origin that operates in Argentina, Mexico, and Brazil.

His other investments include TravelX, an Argentine startup that tokenizes airline tickets using blockchain and NFT technology; Consorcio Abierto, a property management platform for residential properties; Pachama, an environmental technology company based in Silicon Valley that specializes in carbon credit markets; Pura Mente, a Spanish-language meditation app; Waterplan, a water security company founded by Instituto Tecnológico de Buenos Aires (ITBA) graduates; and Properix, a real estate technology company based in Bahía Blanca. Ginóbili has described his investment strategy as focusing on three areas of interest: financial inclusion, mobility, and wellbeing.

== See also ==
- List of NBA career playoff scoring leaders
- List of NBA career playoff steals leaders
- List of NBA career playoff turnovers leaders
- List of NBA career playoff 3-point scoring leaders
- List of NBA career playoff free throw scoring leaders
- List of NBA career playoff games played leaders
- List of NBA players who have spent their entire career with one franchise
- List of oldest and youngest NBA players

Sporting positions
Preceded by Cecilia Rognoni	Olimpia de Oro; 2003; 2004 (with Carlos Tevez)	Succeeded by David Nalbandian
Olympic Games
Preceded by Carlos Espínola	Flagbearer for Argentina; 2008 Beijing	Succeeded by Luciana Aymar
