= Bunge & Born =

Former multinational corporation in Argentina

Bunge & Born was a multinational corporation based in Buenos Aires, Argentina, whose diverse interests included food processing and international trade in grains and oilseeds. It is now known as Bunge Limited.

== History ==
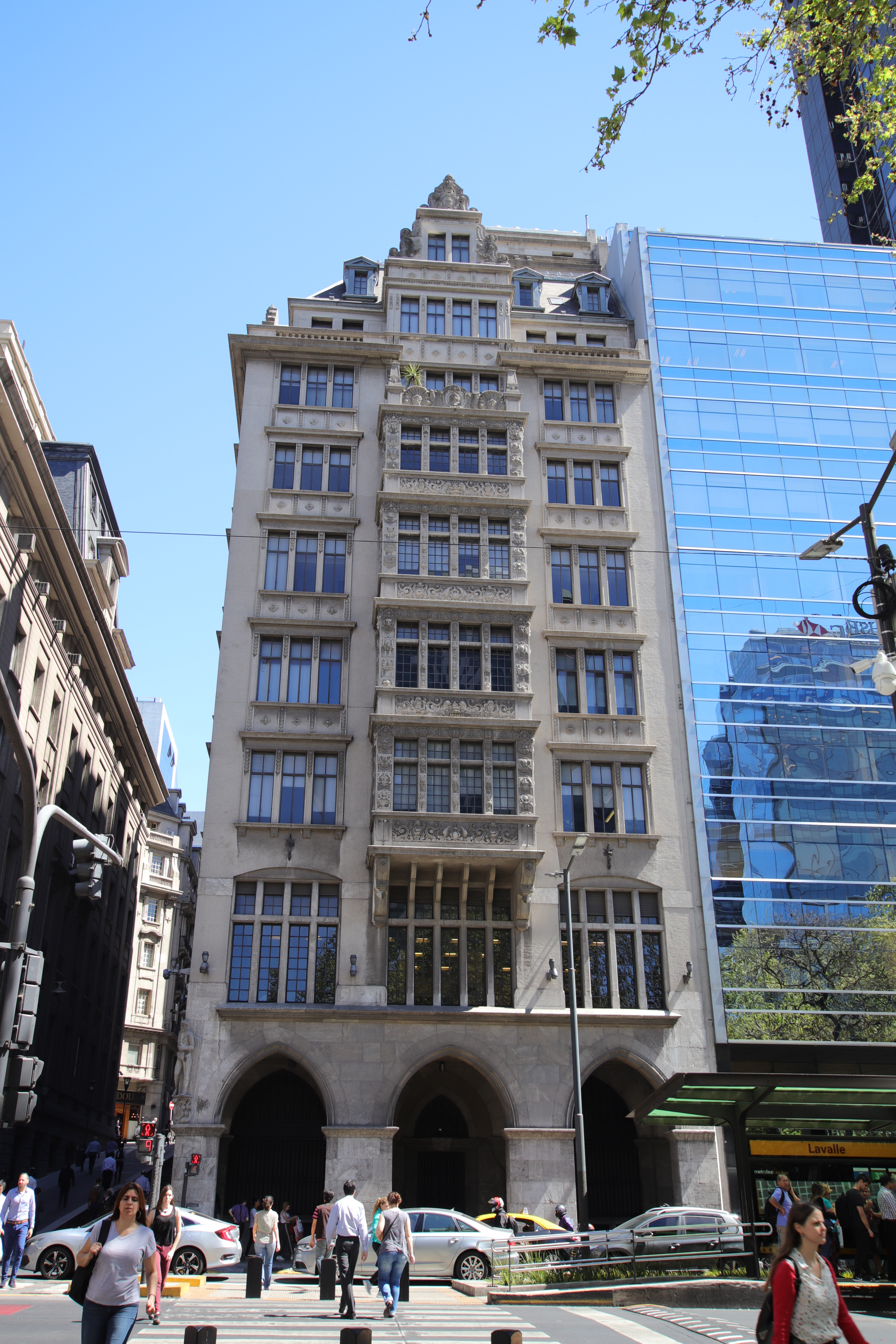
Bunge & Born's Buenos Aires headquarters

Bunge & Born was founded in 1883 by Ernesto Bunge, a German Argentine businessman whose uncle, Karl Bunge, had served as Consul General in Argentina for both the Netherlands and Prussia, and by his brother-in-law Jorge Born, who had recently arrived from Antwerp. The new firm succeeded the Bunge Company, established in Amsterdam by Johan Bunge in 1817.

After acquiring approximately 60,000 hectares (150,000 acres) of agricultural land in the pampas, the company expanded into food processing. In 1898 it established Centenera, its first processing plant, and in 1901 constructed one of the largest wheat mills in Argentina on a site in Puerto Madero. The facility became the foundation of Molinos Río de la Plata, which later emerged as one of the country's leading food manufacturers.

The company subsequently diversified its activities. It founded Argentina's first burlap bag manufacturer and successfully promoted the adoption of protective tariffs on imported sacks. In 1904, Bunge & Born established the Banco Hipotecario Franco Argentino and opened a subsidiary in Brazil. By 1911, it reportedly handled 79% of Argentine cereal exports, at a time when Argentina ranked among the world's principal grain-exporting nations.

During the following decades, the group expanded into a variety of industrial sectors. New subsidiaries included paint manufacturer Alba (1925), chemical and fertilizer producer Compañía Química, and textile company Grafa (1932). By the late 1920s, annual export revenues reportedly reached US$300 million. In 1926, the company inaugurated its headquarters on Leandro Alem Avenue in Buenos Aires, a neo-Gothic building designed by architect Pablo Naeff.

A major change in the company's business environment occurred in 1946, when President Juan Perón created the IAPI (Instituto Argentino de Promoción del Intercambio), a state agency responsible for agricultural purchasing and exports. The measure ended Bunge & Born's dominant position in cereal and flour exports. In response, the group increased its participation in the domestic processed-food market. The IAPI was dissolved in 1956 by the dictatorship of General Aramburu. Following its closure, it became necessary to issue a remediation bond to cover the overdraft the institute held with Banco Nación and the Banco Industrial, since otherwise both banks would face financial difficulties. In this way, including some additional expenditures, the "Provisional Banking Remediation Bond" ("Bono provisional de Saneamiento Bancario") was issued, reaching m$n 21,213.4 million. Although part of its export role was restored following Perón's overthrow in 1955 and the dissolution of the IAPI, the company's principal focus remained on the domestic market for much of the following three decades.

As a privately held corporation, Bunge & Born did not regularly publish financial statements. Nevertheless, it reported gross revenues of approximately US$2 billion in 1962 and had established a network of 110 offices worldwide by that time.

Control of the conglomerate remained concentrated among the Bunge, Born, Hirsch, Engels and De La Tour families, whose interests extended across Argentina's textile, chemical, fertilizer, paint and food-processing sectors.

On 19 September 1974, the company faced a major crisis when brothers Jorge and Juan Born were kidnapped by the guerrilla organization Montoneros. Their release was secured after the payment of a US$60 million ransom, then considered the largest in history. The episode contributed to the relocation of the company's headquarters to São Paulo, Brazil, and has been cited among the factors influencing the political instability that preceded the March 1976 coup.

Despite retaining extensive operations in Argentina—amounting to 44 companies by the 1980s—the controlling families became increasingly affected by internal disputes. In 1988, chief executive Mario Hirsch died following an accidental fall.

The election of Carlos Menem as President of Argentina in 1989 brought the company into closer contact with national economic policymaking. Jorge Born reached an understanding with the incoming administration, and Bunge & Born executives occupied the first two economy minister positions of the Menem government. Measures implemented during this period included substantial increases in public-service tariffs, exchange-rate reforms and a broad wage adjustment, contributing to a temporary stabilization of the economy between July and November 1989.

The company's influence in economic policy proved short-lived. A renewed currency crisis in late 1989, together with difficulties within the group's own businesses, weakened Jorge Born's position. In 1991 he was removed from the board and replaced by chief operating officer Octavio Caraballo.

During the early 1990s, longstanding disagreements between Jorge Born and his brother Juan deepened, undermining the cohesion that had traditionally characterized the shareholder families. Tensions increased further after Jorge Born entered into a business partnership with former Montonero leader Rodolfo Galimberti, one of the figures associated with his 1974 kidnapping.

== Bunge International ==
The company was converted into the Bermuda-registered Bunge International in 1994, retaining the Bunge y Born name only in Argentina. Bunge remained a privately held company of 180 shareholders (including the longtime controlling family interests) and divested itself in 1998, of almost all its retail foods interests in favor of a greater role in international agribusiness and commodity markets; by then the company's gross annual turnover had reached US$13 billion. Bunge ultimately went public on the NYSE in 2001, becoming Bunge Limited.
