= MercadoLibre =

Argentine e-commerce company

MercadoLibre, Inc.

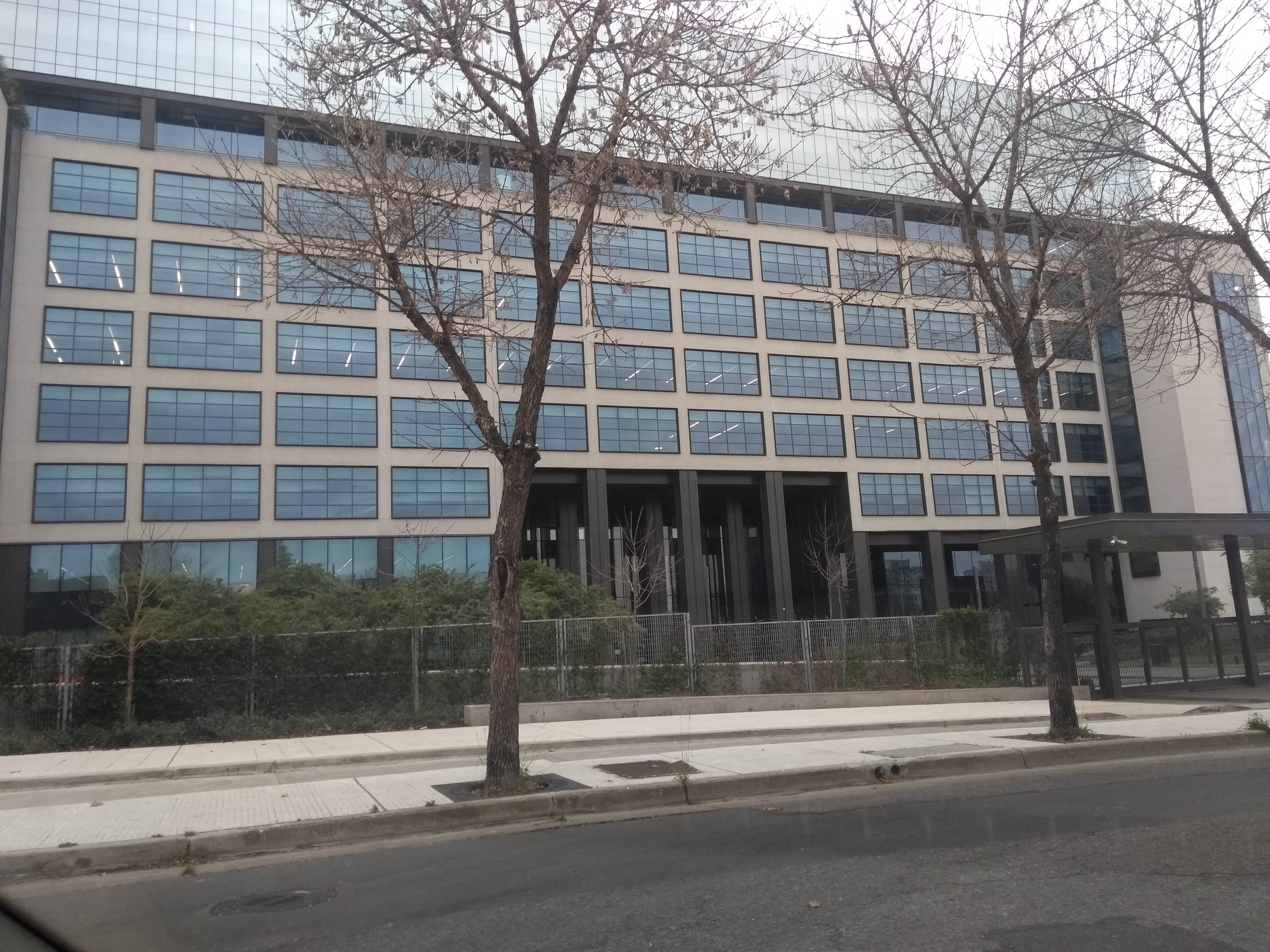
- Former headquarters in Buenos Aires as seen in 2021
- Native name: Mercado Libre (Spanish); Mercado Livre (Portuguese)
- Type: Public
- Traded as: Nasdaq: MELI; Nasdaq-100 component; B3: MELI34
- Industry: E-commerce
- Founded: 2 August 1999; 27 years ago in Buenos Aires, Argentina
- Founder: Marcos Galperin
- Headquarters: Montevideo, Uruguay
- Area served: 18 Countries: Argentina; Bolivia; Brazil; Chile; Colombia; Costa Rica; Dominican Republic; Ecuador; El Salvador; Guatemala; Honduras; Mexico; Nicaragua; Panama; Paraguay; Peru; Uruguay; Venezuela
- Key people: Marcos Galperin (chairman, president & CEO); Martín de los Santos (CFO); Daniel Rabinovich (COO); Osvaldo Giménez (vice president, payments); Giancarlo Moreira (board of directors)
- Brands: Mercado Pago; Mercado Crédito; Mercado Ads; Mercado Envíos; Mercado Shops; Mercado Play; Mercado Coin
- Services: Online marketplace and e-commerce payment system
- Revenue: ▲US$28.9 billion (2025)
- Operating income: ▲US$3.20 billion (2025)
- Net income: ▲US$1.99 billion (2025)
- Total assets: ▲US$42.7 billion (2025)
- Total equity: ▲US$6.75 billion (2025)
- Number of employees: 123,670 (2025)
- Website: mercadolibre.com

MercadoLibre, Inc. (Spanish pronunciation: [meɾˈkaðo ˈliβɾe]), known as Mercado Livre in Brazil (Brazilian Portuguese pronunciation: [meʁˈkadu ˈlivɾi]), literally meaning "free market" in both languages, is a company of Argentine origin headquartered in Montevideo, Uruguay and incorporated in Delaware in the United States that operates online marketplaces dedicated to e-commerce and online auctions. As of 2016, MercadoLibre had 174.2 million users in Latin America, making it the region's most popular e-commerce site by number of visitors.

Aside from being the leading player in Argentina's e-commerce market, it also has operations in Bolivia, Brazil, Chile, Colombia, Costa Rica, the Dominican Republic, Ecuador, El Salvador, Guatemala, Honduras, Mexico, Nicaragua, Panama, Paraguay, Peru, Uruguay, and Venezuela. In 2023, Time included MercadoLibre in the list of the 100 most influential companies in the world.

== History ==
MercadoLibre was founded on August 2, 1999 in Buenos Aires, Argentina. Founder and CEO Marcos Galperin established the company while attending Stanford University in Palo Alto, California in the United States. He acquired funding from John Muse, co-founder of HM Capital Partners. MercadoLibre received additional funding from JPMorgan Partners, Flatiron Partners, Goldman Sachs, GE Capital, and Banco Santander Central Hispano. In 1999, MercadoLibre was chosen as an Endeavor company.

In September 2001, the American online auction company eBay purchased a 19.5% stake in the company. eBay sold its stake in MercadoLibre in 2016, but the companies continue to collaborate to expand eBay sellers into Latin America. eBay opened its first branded store on the MercadoLibre marketplace from Chile in March 2017. The following month, MercadoLibre acquired iBazar.com, the Brazilian subsidiary of eBay's earlier acquisition, iBazar S.A. In 2006, MercadoLibre.com launched new operations in Costa Rica, Panama and the Dominican Republic.

In August 2007, MercadoLibre became the first Latin American technology company to be listed on the NASDAQ, under the ticker MELI. MercadoLibre acquired competitor DeRemate's operations in August 2008. MercadoLibre also acquired Classified Media Group (CMG) in 2008. CMG established the Latin American e-commerce portals tucarro.com and tuinmueble.com.

In 2011, the company transitioned its platform to open source technology. The transition allowed application programming interface (API) developers to expand the platform's solutions and services. In 2013, MercadoLibre launched the MeLi Commerce Fund, dedicated to investing in technology startups that create software using MercadoLibre's APIs.

By August 2016, the fund had invested US$1.5 million in 15 companies in Argentina, Brazil, Colombia and Mexico. MercadoLibre acquired Portal Inmobiliario, a Chilean classified ad website, in 2014. In 2015, MercadoLibre announced its acquisition of Metroscúbicos.com, the portal of Mexico-based real estate company Grupo Expansión.

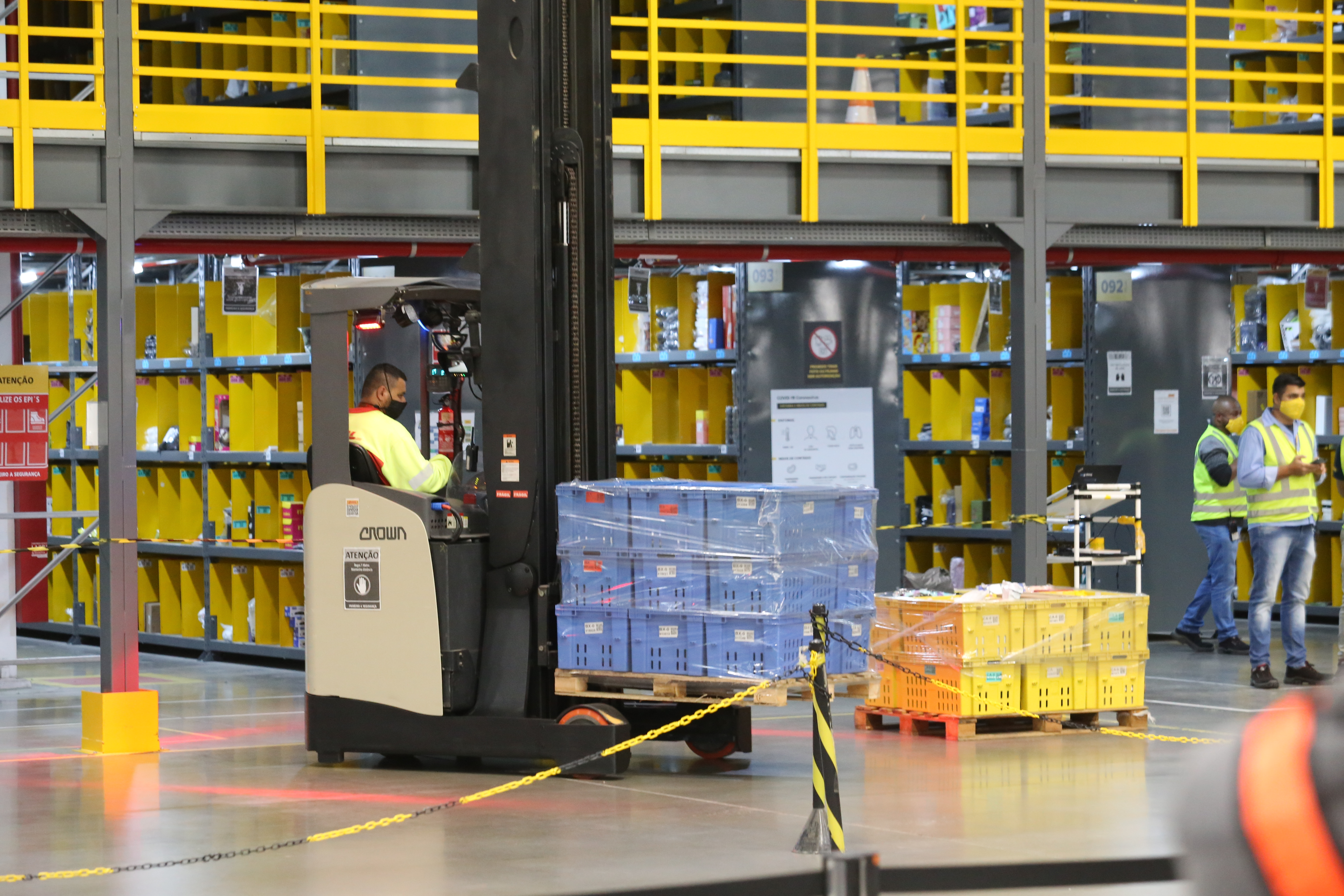
MercadoLibre depot in Brazil

In 2016, MercadoLibre relocated its Brazilian headquarters to new offices in São Paulo, Brazil. The 17,000 square meter complex, named Melicidade, held a cafeteria, auditorium, gym, beauty parlor, meeting and training rooms, and a recreation area. In March 2016, MercadoLibre announced its expansion into Córdoba, Argentina with its new software center.

However, the company announced that the offices located in Córdoba would be closing their doors in August 2025, citing the high cost of municipal taxes, with all the company's staff continuing their work remotely. MercadoLibre opened its first Colombian office in Bogotá in October 2016. It was the company's fourth customer service center in Latin America, following centers in Argentina, Brazil and Uruguay.

On June 19, 2017, MercadoLibre became a NASDAQ-100 company. In 2019, MercadoLibre opened its first distribution centers in Argentina, Brazil and Mexico. In March 2020, MercadoLibre announced its new distribution centers in Chile and Colombia. In June 2020, MercadoLibre announced its new software center in Colombia. In March 2021, MercadoLibre announced an investment of R$1.8 billion in its Brazilian operations.

In April 2025, MercadoLibre announced a ARS$2.6 billion investment in Argentina, representing a 53% increase from the previous year, as part of its regional expansion strategy across Latin America, with plans to hire 2,000 additional employees and expand its logistics network and technological capabilities.

== Operations ==
MercadoLibre operates under five main business units. MarketPlace is its platform for users to sell products, MercadoPago is its payment platform for online sales, Mercado Publicado is the advertising portion of MercadoLibre, MercadoShops is a tool designed to enhance the platform's overall ecosystem, and Mercado Crédito is the company's credit line.

MercadoLibre's MarketPlace is a platform designed to match buyers and sellers. Customers bid for items or pay a set price for offered products. Items are delivered after payment, and users can provide feedback. 3,000 official stores or brands work with MercadoLibre. MercadoLibre also runs a real estate and motors division under the name MercadoLibre Classificados. Realtors pay a monthly fee to list properties and automobiles on the MercadoLibre platform.

MercadoLibre launched MercadoPago, a secure payment system, to diversify payment options. MercadoPago processed 138.7 million transactions in 2016, which was a 73% improvement from 2015. Launched in 2012, MercadoShops was designed to allow small and medium-sized companies to open virtual stores on their existing websites. The stores feature integration with social network sites.

In October 2014, a mobile app was released for MercadoPago which used a credit card reader to allow charges to be processed using a tablet or smartphone using a QR code. The company expanded MercadoPago into Colombia in July 2016. Mercado Crédito's credit process works with buyers and sellers. Rate types for credit lines are determined through a borrower profile. In September 2018, an alliance with BIND Group was announced, through which users of MercadoPago's digital wallet could invest their available balance in units of a mutual fund structured and managed by BIND.

=== Sponsorships ===
MercadoLibre is the title sponsor of the Liga Profesional de Fútbol (AFA), having signed a deal for the 2026-2027 season, and currently sponsors all CONMEBOL club competitions. MercadoLibre is the personal sponsor of Argentine Formula One driver Franco Colapinto, hence the company's logo appears on the Williams and Alpine cars he has driven.

== Corporate affairs ==
The key trends for MercadoLibre are (as of the financial year ending December 31):

	Revenue (USD billion)	EBIT (USD billion)	Total Assets (USD billion)
2015	0.65	0.15	1.00
2016	0.84	0.18	1.36
2017	1.29	0.05	1.67
2018	1.43	(0.07)	2.23
2019	2.29	(0.11)	4.78
2020	3.97	0.08	6.52
2021	7.06	0.24	10.10
2022	10.53	0.78	13.73
2023	14.95	1.55	17.61
2024	20.77	2.43	25.19
2025	28.89	2.84	42.66

== Controversies ==
=== Unauthorized access ===
On March 7, 2022, a cybercriminal group known as Lapsus$ gained access to the data of approximately 300,000 users. The multinational company acknowledged the incident and issued a statement saying that "no evidence was found that the infrastructure systems had been compromised or that user passwords, account balances, investments, financial information, or payment card details had been obtained."

== See also ==
- List of online marketplaces
