= Brubank =

Argentine digital bank

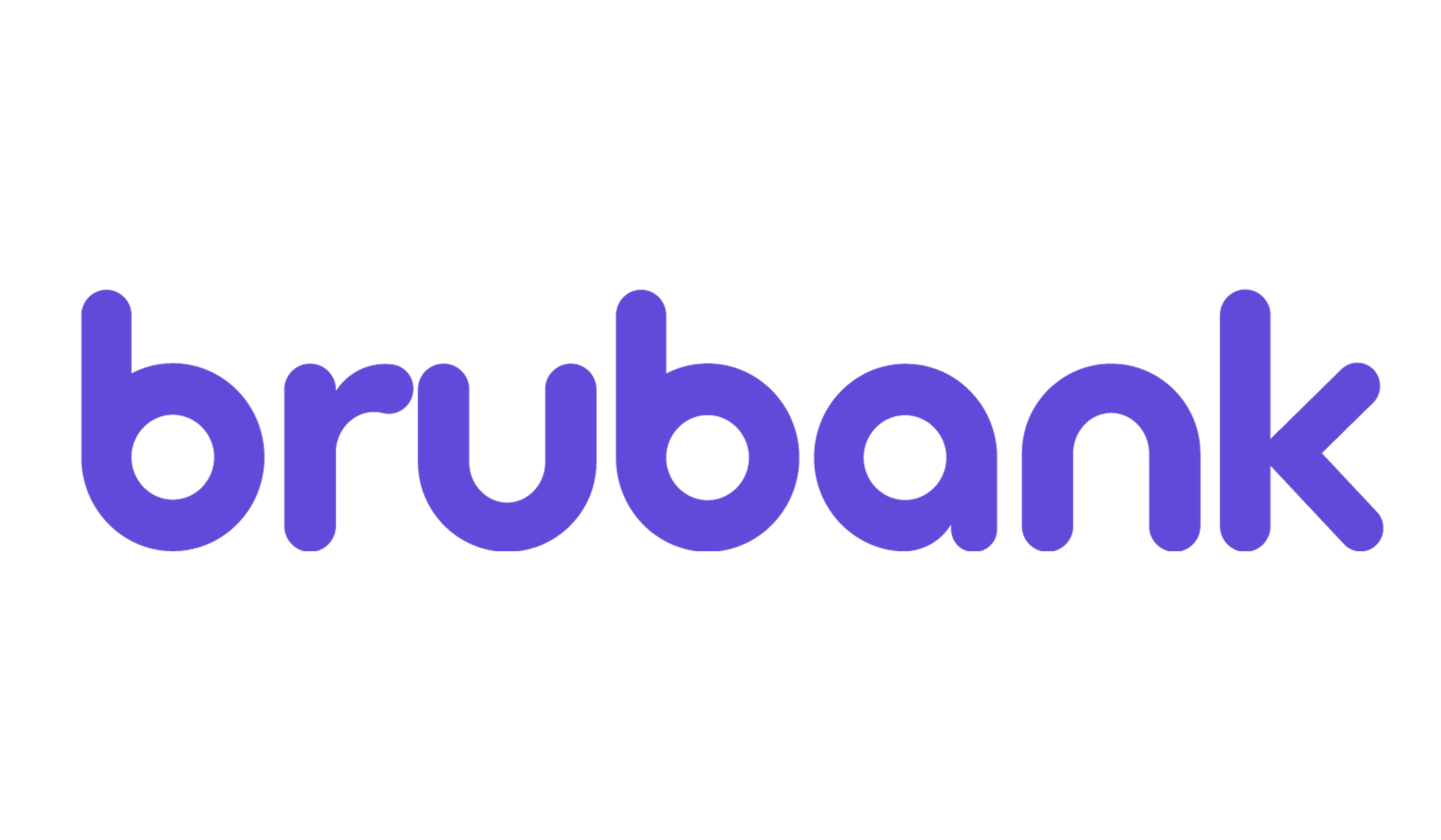
Brubank logo

Brubank is an Argentine digital bank. Headquartered in Buenos Aires, Brubank is a financial technology company offering mobile banking, as well as other financial services. It is recognized as the first entirely digital bank in Argentina.

== Services ==
Brubank associates all its users accounts to a Visa debit card. It also offers exchange service between United States dollars, and Argentine pesos and time deposits in those currencies.

== History ==
Brubank was founded in 2017. Juan Bruchou, CEO of Citibank Argentina, had proposed an entirely digital bank, without branch offices. Brubank obtained license by the Central Bank of Argentina to operate in September 2018. After a first "friends and family" trial, Brubank launched its app on Apple and Android stores. In August 2019, Canadian billionaire David Thomson bought a 15 percent stake in Brubank.

It was reported in 2025, that Nubank began due diligence to acquire Brubank. But, negotiation broke without formal agreement.

== See also ==
- Ualá
