= Carlos García Ottati =

Venezuelan entrepreneur (born 1983)

- Born: Carlos Julio García Ottati; 6 September 1983 (age 43); Caracas, Venezuela
- Education: Andrés Bello Catholic University; University of Oxford (MBA)
- Occupation: Entrepreneur
- Title: Co-founder and CEO of Kavak
- Website: www.kavak.com

Carlos Julio García Ottati (born 6 September 1983) is a Venezuelan entrepreneur. He is the co-founder and chief executive of Kavak, a Mexican company that runs a platform for buying, selling and financing new and used vehicles. In 2020 Kavak became Mexico's first unicorn, a startup valued at more than US$1 billion.

== Early life and education ==
García Ottati was born on 6 September 1983 in Caracas, Venezuela. His family moved often for work, and he lived in about 14 cities across the country as a child. In a 2020 podcast interview he said his first businesses were in restaurants and the liquor trade.

García Ottati studied economics at Andrés Bello Catholic University in Caracas and later earned an MBA from the University of Oxford's Saïd Business School, where he studied in 2010 and 2011.

== Career ==
During his time at Oxford he interned at Amazon. He then worked as a consultant at McKinsey & Company, where he advised eleven companies in eight countries. After McKinsey he co-founded the Mexican operation of Linio, an online marketplace with operations across Latin America, and led it until 2016, when he left to start Kavak.

=== Kavak ===
Kavak was born out of García Ottati's personal experience of moving from Colombia to Mexico. After being scammed while selling his car and encountering legal issues with a vehicle he purchased, García Ottati envisioned a business model that controlled all stages of the car buying and selling process. By purchasing used cars from individuals, reconditioning them in proprietary workshops, selling them, and offering financing and post-sale guarantees, Kavak aimed to eliminate fraud risks and improve accessibility for those unable to afford a new car.

Founded in 2016, Kavak emerged in a Mexican used car market plagued by a 40% fraud rate. Offering secure transactions, the company quickly gained user trust. The model proved highly adaptable to other emerging markets facing similar issues, attracting significant investment from leading venture capital firms including SoftBank, Greenoaks Capital, and Peter Thiel's Founders Fund, which collectively invested over $1 billion.

In its Series C funding round led by SoftBank, Kavak reached a valuation of $1.15 billion in 2020, becoming Mexico's first unicorn startup. By 2021, after raising $700 million in its Series E round, Kavak's valuation soared to over $8.7 billion, making it Latin America's highest-valuation startup.

By late 2022, Kavak had operations in Mexico, Argentina, Brazil and Chile, and had announced its entry into Turkey and the United Arab Emirates, with plans for Saudi Arabia and Oman. It is one of the first Mexican startups to expand into the Middle East and has achieved the largest operational scale of a used car company in emerging markets.

In February 2026 Kavak raised US$300 million in a round led by Andreessen Horowitz, which invested US$200 million.

=== Transformation of the automotive industry ===
As CEO of Kavak, García Ottati has driven various technological innovations and advancements in the Latin American automotive industry. He developed an algorithm based on data and artificial intelligence to provide real-time competitive pricing for buying and selling used cars. This technology also optimizes logistics and car reconditioning processes, streamlining operations within the company's workshops. García Ottati further leveraged this technology to create financial solutions tailored to individual payment capacities. By transcending traditional credit bureau criteria, Kavak has financed over 70% of its sales, enabling 40% of customers to purchase their first car. This contrasts sharply with the traditional market, where less than 5% of used car sales receive financing.

=== The rise of Latin American startups ===
Prior to 2022, the entrepreneurial ecosystem in Latin America only recorded major funding rounds for Brazilian startups, coming from international venture capital funds such as SoftBank and Founders Fund. Other countries in the region seemed to go unnoticed by major foreign investors.

However, García Ottati managed to capture the attention of the world’s most important venture capital funds, which financed his venture with over $1 billion, making Kavak the highest-valued startup in Latin America in 2021. Nonetheless, that same year saw the emergence of eight new unicorn startups in Mexico, which received funding from funds that also had Kavak in their investment portfolios.

In 2021, according to Endeavor data, Mexican startups raised a historic $3.4 billion, 13.5% of the total foreign direct investment received by Mexico that year. Kavak alone accounted for 30% of the venture capital investment attracted to the country.

New Latin American entrepreneurs such as García Ottati have generated over 25,000 new jobs and transactions exceeding $2 billion in Latin America during 2021, according to Endeavor. For these achievements, García Ottati was recognized by Bloomberg Línea as one of the most influential entrepreneurs in the region, featured in their list of "The 500 People Who Move Latin America" due to his contribution to the rise of the region's entrepreneurial ecosystem.

== Other endeavours ==
García Ottati has acquired other companies to enhance technology development in Latin America. In 2022, he acquired OPI Analytics, a Mexican data analytics firm specializing in artificial intelligence and predictive algorithms. This acquisition bolstered Kavak's research and development capabilities, fostering further innovations in the automotive sector.

Additionally, he acquired Draiver, a U.S.-based technology company specializing in automotive logistics and transportation software. Through this acquisition, he implemented a transportation network across ten countries in Latin America, North America, and the Middle East. This network uses advanced systems to ensure safe routes for drivers and real-time monitoring to protect both drivers and cargo.

García Ottati is also an investor and board member of various Latin American startups. Additionally, he participates as an advisor for Endeavor, the world's largest network of entrepreneurs, where he guides entrepreneurs from different parts of the world on how to create successful ventures in Latin America.
