= FIBA Men's Olympics Most Valuable Player =

Basketball award

The FIBA Men's Olympics Most Valuable Player is an award for the sport of basketball, that is given by FIBA, to the player that is voted the Most Valuable Player of the Summer Olympic Games men's basketball tournament.

== FIBA Summer Olympics MVPs ==
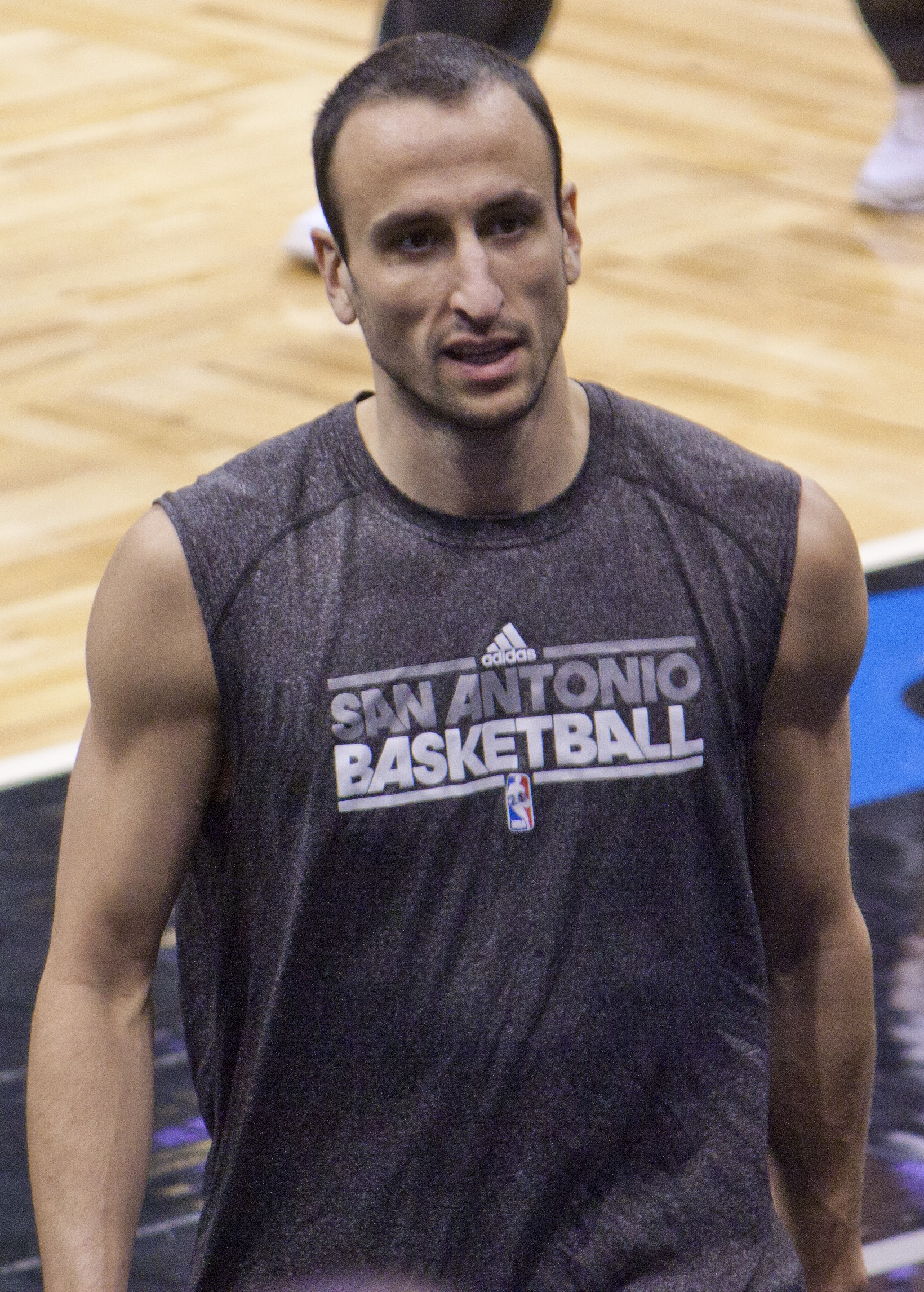
Manu Ginóbili won the Olympics MVP in 2004.

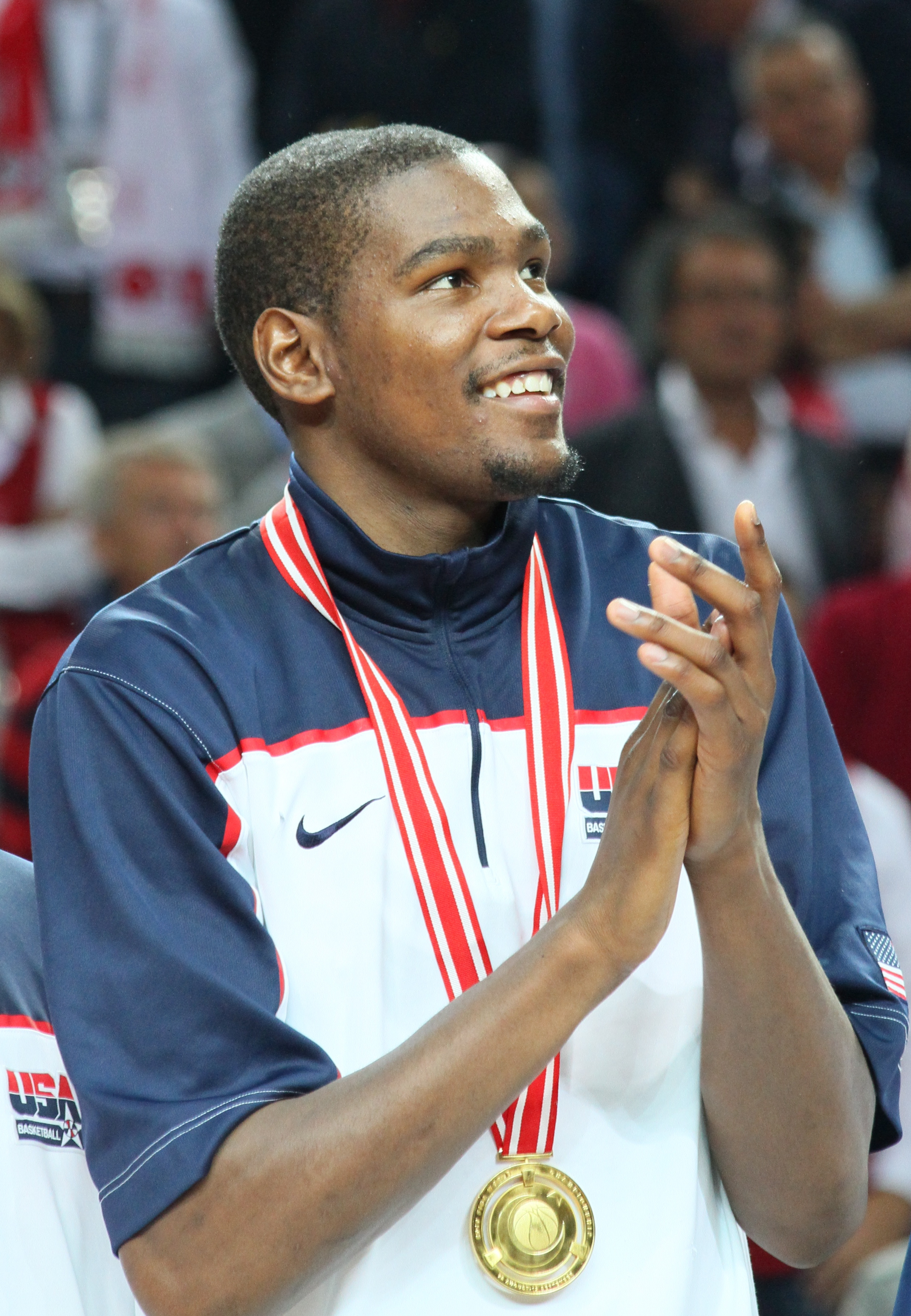
Kevin Durant won the Olympics MVP in 2020.

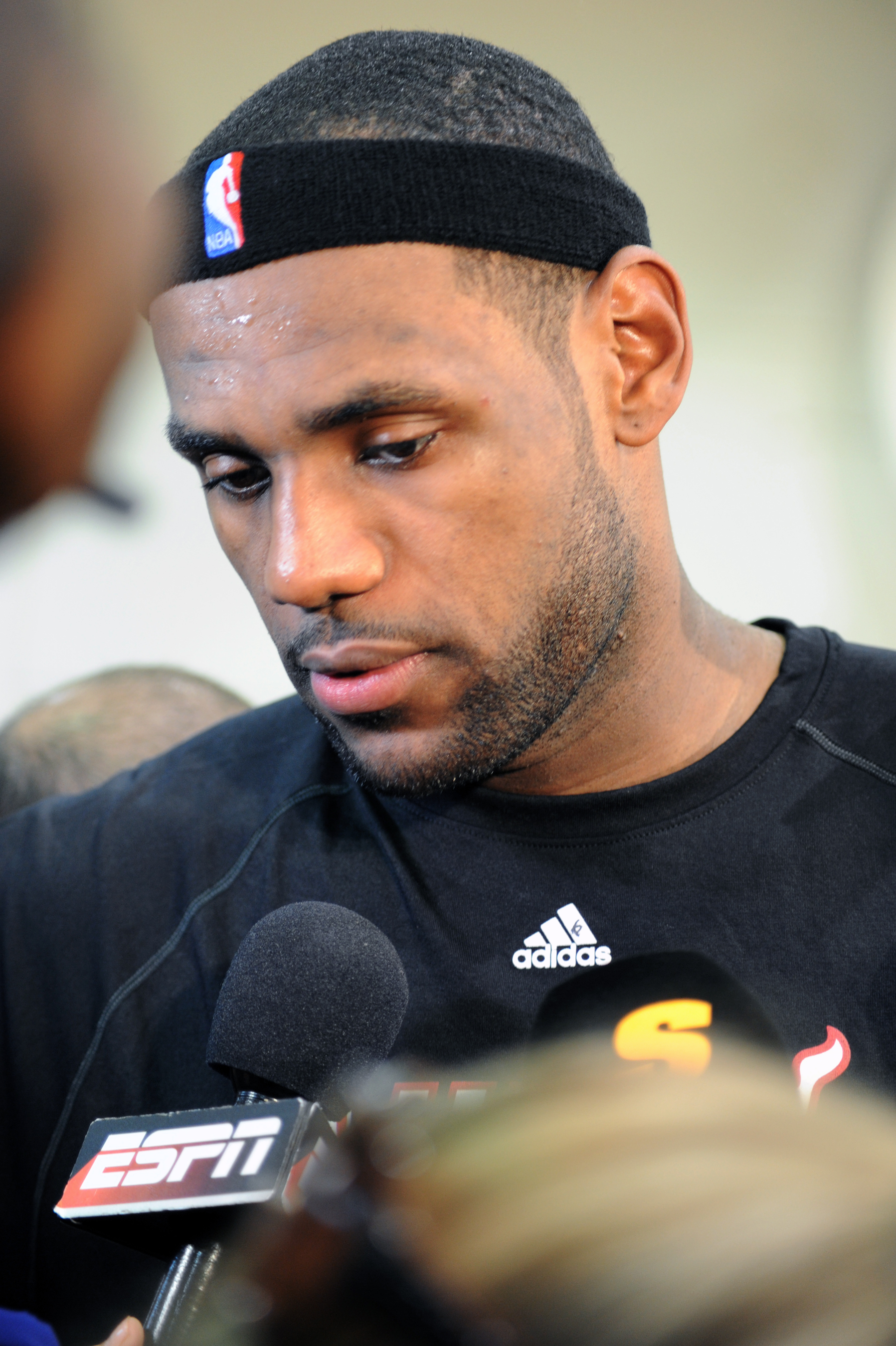
LeBron James won the Olympics MVP in 2024.

	Denotes player whose team won that years tournament
*	Inducted into the Naismith Memorial Basketball Hall of Fame
**	Inducted into the FIBA Hall of Fame
***	Inducted into both the Naismith and FIBA Halls of Fame
	Denotes player who is still active
Player (X)	Denotes the number of times the player had been named MVP at that time
Team (X)	Denotes the number of times a player from this team had won at that time

Year	Player	Position	National Team	Ref.
2004	Manu Ginóbili*	SG	Argentina	
2020	Kevin Durant	PF	United States	
2024	LeBron James	SF	United States (2)	

== See also ==
- FIBA Basketball World Cup Most Valuable Player
