= Antoine Rigaudeau =

French basketball player and coach

Personal information
- Born: 17 December 1971 (age 54) Cholet, Maine-et-Loire, France
- Listed height: 6 ft 7 in (2.01 m)
- Listed weight: 225 lb (102 kg)

Career information
- NBA draft: 1993: undrafted
- Playing career: 1987–2005
- Position: Point guard / shooting guard
- Number: 17

Career history

Playing
- 1987–1995: Cholet
- 1995–1997: Pau-Orthez
- 1997–2003: Virtus Bologna
- 2003: Dallas Mavericks
- 2003–2005: Valencia

Career highlights
- As a player: 2× EuroLeague champion (1998, 2001); FIBA European Selection (1991); 4× FIBA EuroStar (1996–1999); 2× Italian League champion (1998, 2001); 3× Italian Cup winner (1999, 2001, 2002); French League champion (1996); 5× French League French Player's MVP (1991–1994, 1996); 3× French League Best Young Player (1990–1992); No. 4 retired by Cholet; French National Sports Hall of Fame (2017); French Basketball Hall of Fame (2010)
- Stats at NBA.com
- Stats at Basketball Reference
- FIBA Hall of Fame
Medals
Men's basketball
Representing France
Olympics
| Silver medal – second place | 2000 Sydney |
EuroBasket
| Bronze medal – third place | 2005 Serbia & Montenegro |
Mediterranean Games
| Bronze medal – third place | 1993 France |

Antoine Roger Rigaudeau (born 17 December 1971) is a French former professional basketball player and professional basketball coach. During his playing days, he played at the point guard, shooting guard, and small forward positions. Also during his playing career, his nickname was "Le Roi" ("The King").

During his pro club career, he won two EuroLeague championships, in 1998 and 2001. With the France national team, he won the silver medal at the 2000 Olympics. He was inducted into the French Basketball Hall of Fame in 2010. He became a FIBA Hall of Fame player in 2015.

== Professional career ==
=== Europe ===
Rigaudeau won the French Pro A League championship with Pau-Orthez, in 1996. With Virtus Bologna, he won the EuroLeague championship in the EuroLeague 1997–98 and EuroLeague 2000–01 seasons. With the same club, he also played in the EuroLeague Finals in 1999 and 2002. With Virtus Bologna, he also won two Italian Serie A League championships, in 1998 and 2001; and three Italian Cup titles, in 1999, 2001, and 2002.

=== NBA ===
Rigaudeau played in the National Basketball Association (NBA) with the Dallas Mavericks, during their 2002–03 season, after he signed a three-year contract with the club, on 17 January 2003. With the Mavericks, he played in a total of 11 games, and averaged 1.5 points, 0.7 rebounds, and 0.5 assists per game, in 8.3 minutes played per game. On 18 August 2003, the Mavericks traded Rigaudeau's player rights to the Golden State Warriors, prior to the start of the 2003–04 NBA season. On 5 September 2003, the Warriors released Rigaudeau.

=== Return to Europe ===
After being released by the Golden State Warriors, Rigaudeau returned to Europe, and joined the Spanish ACB League club Valencia. He officially retired from playing pro club basketball in 2005, after he had previously suffered an Achilles tendon injury on his left foot.

== National team career ==
Rigaudeau was a member of the senior France national team. He represented France at the 1991 EuroBasket, the 1993 EuroBasket, the 1995 EuroBasket, and the 1999 EuroBasket. With France, he won the silver medal at the 2000 Olympics.

In 2001, before that year's EuroBasket tournament, Rigaudeau retired from playing with the senior France national team. However, he later decided to rejoin the national team for the 2005 EuroBasket, where he won the bronze medal. He retired again from the France national team after that tournament. He had a total of 127 appearances with France's senior national team.

== Coaching career ==
Rigaudeau began his professional coaching career in 2015, when he became the head coach of the French Pro A League club Paris-Levallois, which was later renamed to Metropolitans 92.

== Career statistics ==
Legend
| GP | Games played | GS | Games started | MPG | Minutes per game |
| FG% | Field goal percentage | 3P% | 3-point field goal percentage | FT% | Free throw percentage |
| RPG | Rebounds per game | APG | Assists per game | SPG | Steals per game |
| BPG | Blocks per game | PPG | Points per game | **Bold** | Career high |

=== NBA ===
==== Regular season ====
| Year | Team | GP | GS | MPG | FG% | 3P% | FT% | RPG | APG | SPG | BPG | PPG |
|---|---|---|---|---|---|---|---|---|---|---|---|---|
| 2002–03 | Dallas | 11 | 0 | 8.3 | .229 | .200 | – | .7 | .5 | .3 | .0 | 1.5 |

== Honours and awards as a player ==
=== Pau-Orthez ===
- French Pro A League Champion: 1996

=== Virtus Bologna ===
- 2× Italian Serie A League Champion: 1998, 2001
- 2× EuroLeague champion: 1998, 2001
- 3× Italian Cup Winner: 1999, 2001, 2002

=== Senior France national team ===
- 1993 Mediterranean Games: Bronze
- 2000 Olympics: Silver
- 2005 EuroBasket: Bronze

=== Individual honours and awards ===
- 3× French Pro A League Best Young Player: 1990, 1991, 1992
- 5× French League All-Star: 1990, 1991, 1993, 1994, 1995
- 5× French Pro A League French Player's MVP: 1991, 1992, 1993, 1994, 1996
- FIBA European Selection: 1991
- 4× FIBA EuroStar: 1996, 1997, 1998, 1999
- 2× Italian League All-Star: 1997, 1998
- 2× EuroLeague Finals Top Scorer: 1998, 1999
- EuroLeague All-Final Four Team: 1998
- No. 4 retired by Cholet
- French Basketball Hall of Fame: (2010)
- FIBA Hall of Fame: 2015
- French National Sports Hall of Fame: 2017

== See also ==
- List of French NBA players
