= Mindaugas Timinskas =

Lithuanian basketball player & coach (born 1974)

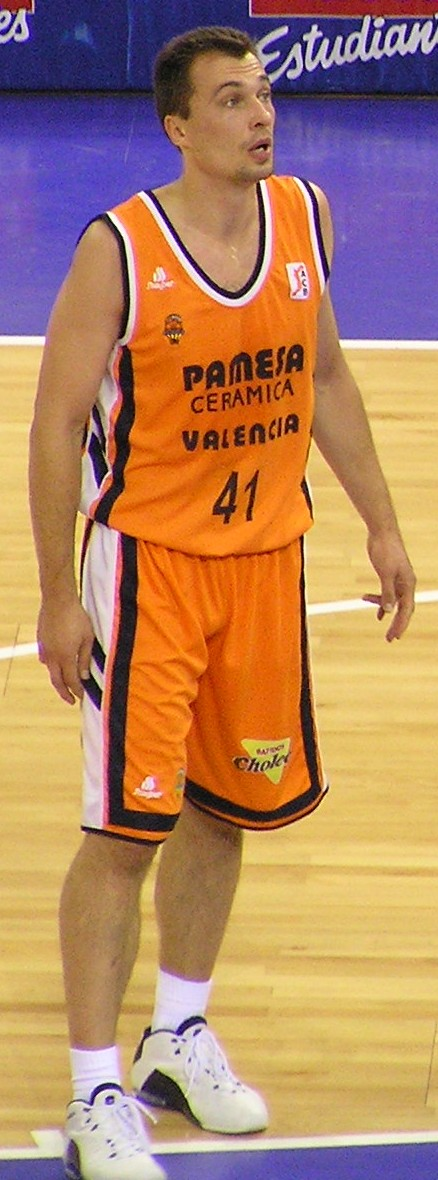
- Timinskas with Valencia in 2005

Personal information
- Born: March 28, 1974 (age 52) Šilutė, Lithuanian SSR, Soviet Union
- Listed height: 6 ft 7 in (2.01 m)
- Listed weight: 232 lb (105 kg)

Career information
- College: Iona (1993–1997)
- NBA draft: 1997: undrafted
- Playing career: 1997–2009
- Position: Small forward / power forward

Career history
- 1997: Šilutė
- 1997: Strasbourg
- 1997–1998: Weissenfels
- 1998–1999: Carigo Gorizia
- 1999–2000: Žalgiris
- 2000–2002: Tau Cerámica
- 2002: Paris Basket Racing
- 2002–2005: Žalgiris
- 2005–2008: Pamesa Valencia

Career highlights
- Spanish ACB League champion (2002); 3× Lithuanian LKL champion (2003–2005); Lithuanian LKL Finals MVP (2005); LKL MVP (2000); Lithuanian All Star Game MVP (2000); MAAC Player of the Year (1997)
Medals
Men's basketball
Representing Lithuania
Summer Olympic Games
Bronze medal – third place	2000 Sydney
EuroBasket
Silver medal – second place	1995 Greece

Mindaugas Timinskas (born March 28, 1974) is a Lithuanian former professional basketball player and coach. He represented the Lithuania national team.

== College career ==
Born in Šilutė, Lithuanian SSR, Timinskas played NCAA Division I college basketball, in the United States, at Iona College, from 1993 to 1997.

== Professional career ==
After college, Timinskas returned to Lithuania. Timinskas began his pro career in the 1997–98 season, after he signed with his home town team of Šilutė. At the time, the team was playing in the Lithuanian Basketball League (LKL).

Timinskas left his main mark in his career, while playing with the Spanish Liga ACB club TAU Cerámica, during the EuroLeague 2000–01 Finals. During the finals, he had three double-digit scoring games, most notably with 18 points scored in Game 4, to force the series to a fifth and final contest. His rim-rocking dunk in that game, is still remembered as one of the greatest highlights of the EuroLeague's modern era (2001 to present).

== Coaching career ==
Timinskas was named the head coach of the Cary Academy varsity basketball team, for the 2012–13 season, replacing Kenny Inge. He was let go following the 2015–16 season.

== Career statistics ==
Legend
GP	Games played	GS	Games started	MPG	Minutes per game
FG%	Field-goal percentage	3P%	3-point field-goal percentage	FT%	Free-throw percentage
RPG	Rebounds per game	APG	Assists per game	SPG	Steals per game
BPG	Blocks per game	PPG	Points per game	PIR	Performance index rating
**Bold**	Career high

=== EuroLeague ===
Year	Team	GP	GS	MPG	FG%	3P%	FT%	RPG	APG	SPG	BPG	PPG	PIR
2000–00	Tau Cerámica	**22**	4	22.2	.556	.233	.756	3.0	1.2	1.0	.2	6.1	6.1
2001–02	Tau Cerámica	10	6	22.3	**.564**	.267	.818	2.8	1.1	**1.6**	.3	7.4	7.8
2002–03	Žalgiris	8	5	26.4	.356	**.471**	**.909**	**5.5**	1.4	.9	**.5**	9.5	9.4
2003–04	Žalgiris	20	12	25.1	.542	.341	.714	5.2	**2.1**	1.1	.3	8.0	10.4
2004–05	Žalgiris	20	**19**	**30.3**	.465	.400	.810	5.3	2.0	1.3	.3	**12.7**	**13.8**

== Awards and achievements ==
=== College ===
- MAAC Player of the Year: (1997)

=== Pro clubs ===
- LKL MVP: (2000)
- Lithuanian All-Star Game MVP: (2000)
- Spanish ACB League Champion: (2002)
- 3× Lithuanian LKL League Champion: (2003, 2004, 2005)
- Lithuanian League Finals MVP: (2005)

=== Lithuanian junior national team ===
- 1996 FIBA Europe Under-22 Championship: Gold

=== Lithuanian senior national team ===
- 1995 EuroBasket: Silver
- 2000 Summer Olympics: Bronze
