= Linda Rottenberg =

American businesswoman and author

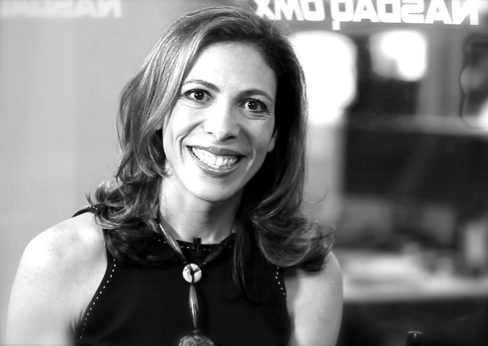
- Education: Harvard University (BA); Yale University (JD)
- Occupations: CEO & Co-founder of Endeavor
- Spouse: Bruce Feiler
- Children: 2

Linda Rottenberg is an American businesswoman and author. She is the author of Crazy Is a Compliment: The Power of Zigging When Everyone Else Zags. She is the CEO and co-founder of Endeavor, a non-profit organization that encourages the power of entrepreneurship.

She serves on the board of Zayo Group, a global provider of bandwidth infrastructure (NYSE: ZAYO). She is a member of the Inter-American Dialogue, Council on Foreign Relations, and Young Presidents' Organization (YPO) and serves on the entrepreneurship steering committee of the World Economic Forum.

== Early life and education ==
Originally from Newton, Massachusetts, Rottenberg received her J.D. from Yale Law School and B.A. magna cum laude in Social Studies from Harvard College, where she was a National Merit Scholar.

== Career ==
Rottenberg co-founded Endeavor, an organization encouraging high-impact entrepreneurs, in 1997. Headquartered in New York with 50 offices across the globe, Endeavor identifies, mentors, and co-invests in individuals with the biggest ideas. After spawning entrepreneurship ecosystems around the world, in 2013 Endeavor started work in the U.S..

Rottenberg has been profiled in the Wall Street Journal, Forbes, The Economist, Financial Times, USA Today, Strategy + Business, People, Glamour, and MORE, and has appeared on GMA, The Today Show, Morning Joe, Nightline, NPR, CNBC, CNN, Fox News, Fox Business, and Bloomberg News. Dell featured her in its "Take Your Own Path" ad campaign and Veuve Clicquot named her Businesswoman of the Year.

Rottenberg also wrote Crazy Is a Compliment: The Power of Zigging When Everyone Else Zags, which was published in 2014.

== Personal life ==
Rottenberg lives in Brooklyn with her husband, author and New York Times columnist Bruce Feiler, and their identical twin daughters.

== Honors ==
Rottenberg was named one of "America's Best Leaders" by U.S. News and one of TIME's 100 "Innovators for the 21st century." She lectures at Fortune 500 companies. Rottenberg is the subject of four case studies by Harvard Business School and the Stanford Graduate School of Business. ABC and NPR declared her "the entrepreneur whisperer," journalist; Thomas Friedman dubbed her the world's "mentor capitalist," Business Insider named her "Ms. Davos," and she was known as "la chica loca"

- 23rd Annual Heinz Award in Technology, the Economy, and Employment (2018)
- Named to Forbes "Impact 30" – Forbes
- "Take Your Own Path" campaign winner – Dell
- 2009 Asper Award for Global Entrepreneurship
- One of America's Best Leaders 2008 – U.S. News & World Report
- "Innovator for the 21st Century" – Time Magazine
- "Business Woman of the Year: 2008" – Veuve Clicquot
- One of the top 100 innovators in the world under the age of 35 – MIT Technology Review TR100
- "Global Leader for Tomorrow" and "Young Global Leader" – World Economic Forum
- The 1st female chair of the World Economic Forum on the Middle East (2007)
- One of the World's Top 40 Social Entrepreneurs – Schwab Foundation for Social Entrepreneurship (2001)
- 10 Women to Watch of 2008 – Running Start
- Person of the Year – Organization of Women in International Trade (2007)
- The Most Important Not-For-Profit Leader in Latin America – Poder–BCG Business
- Member, Inter-American Dialogue
