= BIND Group =

Argentine financial conglomerate

- Type: Private
- Industry: Financial services
- Founded: 1928; 98 years ago
- Headquarters: Buenos Aires, Argentina
- Key people: Ariel Sigal (President); Carlota Durst de Meta (Honorary President) Marcela Fernie (CEO)
- Total assets: 3.03 trillion pesos (2025) (USD 2.079 billion)
- Number of employees: +1,000
- Website: bind.com.ar

BIND Group is an Argentine financial conglomerate headquartered in Buenos Aires. It comprises BIND Banco Industrial S.A. and a group of companies specialising in financial services, technology, and investment: BIND Inversiones, BIND Seguros, BIND Garantías, BIND Leasing, BIND Broker Seguros, BIND PSP, bindX (fintech solutions), Credicuotas, Júbilo, and Natan.VC (venture capital).

== History ==
=== Origins (1928–1989) ===
In 1928, the Banco de Azul was founded in the city of Azul, Buenos Aires Province, with the aim of promoting agro-industrial development in the region.

In 1956, the Industrial Cooperativa de Crédito was established at Avenida Gaona 3735 in Buenos Aires. In 1971, the Central Bank of Argentina (BCRA) authorised its conversion into a credit union.

=== Institutional transformation (1990–1999) ===
In 1996, the entity began operating as La Industrial Compañía Financiera S.A. In 1997, it acquired the assets and liabilities of Nuevo Banco de Azul S.A., including more than 14,000 accounts and seventy years of banking history in the region. The BCRA authorised its conversion into a retail commercial bank, and the entity continued operating as Nuevo Banco Industrial de Azul S.A., with its head office in Buenos Aires and eight branches.

=== Growth and diversification (2001–2015) ===
In 2003, the bank absorbed Banco Velox's assets and liabilities. The acquisition extended its branch network across Argentina. In 2006, the Buenos Aires Stock Exchange authorised Industrial Valores S.A. to operate as a brokerage firm. In 2010, with BCRA authorisation, the entity changed its legal name to Banco Industrial S.A. and Industrial Broker de Seguros was created. In 2012, Industrial Asset Management was established through the acquisition of MBA Asset Management. The bank adopted the BIND brand in 2013.

=== Restructuring and new brand identity (2016–2018) ===
In 2016, the bank began offering web banking through a platform called BIND24, covering both personal and business accounts. That year, BIND joined the BCRA's innovation roundtable. The group entered a strategic alliance with Poincenot Technology Studio, a fintech firm chaired by Facundo Vázquez.

In 2017, the group acquired five service centres from Banco Finansur S.A., expanding its operations in Greater Buenos Aires and its base of pension-recipient customers, and started working with fintech startups through a programme called BIND Innova. In 2018, the bank introduced API Bank.

The bank developed a product in partnership with Mercado Pago that allowed users of the application to invest in a mutual fund.

In May 2018, the bank joined the International Finance Corporation's (IFC) Global Trade Finance Programme, part of the World Bank Group. The IFC granted BIND Banco Industrial a loan of US$55,000,000 (fifty-five million dollars) to expand lending to small and medium-sized enterprises (SMEs). In December 2018, the group announced a new brand architecture under which BIND would serve as the umbrella brand for the entire ecosystem, and Grupo BIND was established as a financial holding company.

=== New products and regional expansion (2019–present) ===
In 2019, the bank introduced digital onboarding, allowing fully digital account opening. The bank also registered with the National Securities Commission's public offering regime that year, which enabled it to issue public debt.

In 2023, the group inaugurated its new headquarters in the Plaza San Martín building in Buenos Aires. It expanded regionally with the launch of BIND Inversiones Uruguay, and created Bind Pagos as a new business unit focused on payment services.

In 2024, the group launched BindX, a new brand consolidating all its financial products and solutions. Companies including Aerolíneas Argentinas, Cencosud, and Natura integrated financial services through BIND's Banking-as-a-Service infrastructure.

In March 2026, BindX Innova began as a partnership between bindX, Endeavor, and Natan VC. The programme targets fintech startups in payments, lending, wealthtech, and blockchain. In April 2026, Bind Uy Administradora de Fondos de Inversión received authorization from the Central Bank of Uruguay to operate as a fund manager.

== Business units ==
- BIND Banco Industrial S.A.: the banking entity at the core of the group, specialising in services for SMEs, corporations, and fintechs.
- BIND Inversiones: mutual fund management company and stock exchange agent (formerly Industrial Asset Management and Industrial Valores). It manages the Mercado Pago investment fund.
- BIND Garantías: mutual guarantee society (SGR), formed from the acquisition of Garantías de Valores SGR.
- BIND Seguros and BIND Broker de Seguros: insurance units.
- BIND Leasing: financial leasing unit.
- BIND PSP: payment service provider.
- bindX: Banking-as-a-Service platform and open financial APIs.
- Poincenot Tech Studio: financial technology company, allied with the group since 2013.
- Credicuotas: consumer credit fintech.
- Tienda Júbilo: benefits platform for retirees (formerly known as Jubind).
- NatanVC: the group's venture capital vehicle.

== See also ==
- Central Bank of Argentina
- Economy of Argentina
