= 2001 Euroleague Finals =

Basketball tournament playoffs

Tournament details
- Arena: PalaMalaguti; Fernando Buesa Arena; Bologna, Italy; Vitoria-Gasteiz, Spain
- Dates: 17 April 2001– 10 May 2001

Final positions
- Champions: (Italy) Kinder Bologna (2nd title)
- Runners-up: (Spain) TAU Cerámica

Awards and statistics
- MVP: (Argentina) Manu Ginóbili

The 2001 Euroleague Finals was the final playoffs for the title of the 2000–01 Euroleague.

After five games, Kinder Bologna achieved its second title against TAU Cerámica. Argentine Manu Ginóbili was named MVP of the Finals.

== Results ==
=== Game 1 ===
17 April 2001
20:30

Report

Kinder Bologna (Italy)	65–78	(Spain) TAU Cerámica
Scoring by quarter: 14–18, 16–28, 19–19, 16–13
Pts: Jarić 14; Rebs: Andersen 8 Asts: Abbio, Ginóbili 2		Pts: Alexander 21; Rebs: Alexander 19; Asts: four players 1

PalaMalaguti, Bologna
Attendance: 7,013
Referees: Coelho (POR), Tsanidis (GRE), Mpotitsis (GRE)

Kinder Bologna	TAU Cerámica

Starters:			P	R	A
PG	14	(France) Antoine Rigaudeau	4	3	0
SG	6	(Argentina) Manu Ginóbili	8	2	2
SF	19	(Serbia and Montenegro) Marko Jarić	14	4	0
PF	13	(Australia) David Andersen	12	8	1
PF	12	(Italy) Alessandro Frosini	11	7	1
Reserves:			P	R	A
PG	7	(Italy) Alessandro Abbio (C)	10	1	2
SG	8	(Italy) Davide Bonora	2	2	1
C	9	(Serbia and Montenegro) Nikola Jestratijević	0	1	0
PF	11	(Italy) Fabrizio Ambrassa	DNP		
PF	18	(Slovenia) Matjaž Smodiš	4	0	0
Head coach:
(Italy) Ettore Messina

Kinder Bologna	TAU Cerámica
0	1

Starters:			P	R	A
PG	6	(United States) Elmer Bennett	15	5	1
SG	7	(France) Laurent Foirest	20	7	0
SF	11	(Lithuania) Saulius Štombergas	5	4	1
PF	14	(Argentina) Fabricio Oberto	0	3	0
C	13	(United States) Victor Alexander	21	19	1
Reserves:			P	R	A
PF	4	(Argentina) Luis Scola	6	5	0
SF	5	(Spain) Dani García	DNP		
SF	9	(Spain) Sergi Vidal (C)	DNP		
PF	10	(Lithuania) Mindaugas Timinskas	11	3	1
Head coach:
(Serbia and Montenegro) Duško Ivanović

=== Game 2 ===
19 April 2001
20:30

Report

Kinder Bologna (Italy)	94–73	(Spain) TAU Cerámica
Scoring by quarter: 32–16, 20–19, 18–15, 24–13
Pts: Rigaudeau 23; Rebs: Griffith 8 Asts: Ginóbili 3		Pts: Alexander 17; Rebs: Alexander, Oberto 8 Asts: Bennett, Oberto 1

PalaMalaguti, Bologna
Attendance: 7,046
Referees: Stokes (ENG), Nowicki (POL), Lovsin (SLO)

Kinder Bologna	TAU Cerámica

Starters:			P	R	A
PG	14	(France) Antoine Rigaudeau	23	4	0
SG	6	(Argentina) Manu Ginóbili	11	5	3
SF	19	(Serbia and Montenegro) Marko Jarić	13	2	0
PF	12	(Italy) Alessandro Frosini	3	7	0
C	15	(United States) Rashard Griffith	9	8	1
Reserves:			P	R	A
PG	7	(Italy) Alessandro Abbio (C)	14	6	2
SG	8	(Italy) Davide Bonora	2	1	1
C	9	(Serbia and Montenegro) Nikola Jestratijević	DNP		
PF	13	(Australia) David Andersen	14	6	0
PF	18	(Slovenia) Matjaž Smodiš	5	1	0
Head coach:
(Italy) Ettore Messina

Kinder Bologna	TAU Cerámica
1	1

Starters:			P	R	A
PG	6	(United States) Elmer Bennett	10	0	0
SG	7	(France) Laurent Foirest	2	0	0
SF	11	(Lithuania) Saulius Štombergas	12	2	0
PF	14	(Argentina) Fabricio Oberto	10	8	1
C	13	(United States) Victor Alexander	17	8	0
Reserves:			P	R	A
PF	4	(Argentina) Luis Scola	7	3	0
SF	5	(Spain) Dani García	DNP		
SF	9	(Spain) Sergi Vidal (C)	5	0	0
PF	10	(Lithuania) Mindaugas Timinskas	10	2	0
Head coach:
(Serbia and Montenegro) Duško Ivanović

=== Game 3 ===
1 May 2001
20:30

Report

(Spain) TAU Cerámica	60–80	(Italy) Kinder Bologna
Scoring by quarter: 16–14, 14–23, 17–19, 13–24
Pts: Oberto 15; Rebs: Oberto 13; Asts: Bennett 6		Pts: Ginóbili 27; Rebs: Frosini, Jarić 7 Asts: four players 2

Fernando Buesa Arena, Vitoria-Gasteiz
Attendance: 9,323
Referees: De Keyser (BEL), Koukoulekidis (GRE), Ankarali (TUR)

TAU Cerámica	Kinder Bologna

Starters:			P	R	A
PG	6	(United States) Elmer Bennett	9	2	6
SG	7	(France) Laurent Foirest	8	2	0
SF	11	(Lithuania) Saulius Štombergas	5	3	1
PF	14	(Argentina) Fabricio Oberto	15	13	0
C	13	(United States) Victor Alexander	13	5	0
Reserves:			P	R	A
PF	4	(Argentina) Luis Scola	8	6	2
SF	5	(Spain) Dani García	DNP		
SF	9	(Spain) Sergi Vidal (C)	0	0	0
PF	10	(Lithuania) Mindaugas Timinskas	2	2	0
Head coach:
(Serbia and Montenegro) Duško Ivanović

TAU Cerámica	Kinder Bologna
1	2

Starters:			P	R	A
PG	14	(France) Antoine Rigaudeau	15	0	2
SG	6	(Argentina) Manu Ginóbili	27	4	1
SF	19	(Serbia and Montenegro) Marko Jarić	7	7	2
PF	12	(Italy) Alessandro Frosini	1	7	2
C	15	(United States) Rashard Griffith	2	4	2
Reserves:			P	R	A
PG	7	(Italy) Alessandro Abbio (C)	11	3	0
SG	8	(Italy) Davide Bonora	2	0	0
PF	11	(Italy) Fabrizio Ambrassa	DNP		
PF	13	(Australia) David Andersen	2	1	0
PF	18	(Slovenia) Matjaž Smodiš	13	1	1
Head coach:
(Italy) Ettore Messina

=== Game 4 ===
3 May 2001
20:30

Report

(Spain) TAU Cerámica	96–79	(Italy) Kinder Bologna
Scoring by quarter: 24–17, 19–14, 26–23, 27–25
Pts: Bennett 19; Rebs: Oberto 9 Asts: Bennett 8		Pts: Griffith 18; Rebs: Griffith 6 Asts: Rigaudeau 5

Fernando Buesa Arena, Vitoria-Gasteiz
Attendance: 9,323
Referees: Coelho (POR), Tsanidis (GRE), Mpotistis (GRE)

TAU Cerámica	Kinder Bologna

Starters:			P	R	A
PG	6	(United States) Elmer Bennett	19	4	8
SG	7	(France) Laurent Foirest	10	1	0
SF	11	(Lithuania) Saulius Štombergas	8	1	2
PF	14	(Argentina) Fabricio Oberto	8	9	2
C	13	(United States) Victor Alexander	18	2	0
Reserves:			P	R	A
PF	4	(Argentina) Luis Scola	13	2	1
SF	5	(Spain) Dani García	1	1	0
SF	9	(Spain) Sergi Vidal (C)	1	0	0
PF	10	(Lithuania) Mindaugas Timinskas	18	5	2
Head coach:
(Serbia and Montenegro) Duško Ivanović

TAU Cerámica	Kinder Bologna
2	2

Starters:			P	R	A
PG	14	(France) Antoine Rigaudeau	14	1	0
SG	6	(Argentina) Manu Ginóbili	15	3	4
SF	19	(Serbia and Montenegro) Marko Jarić	0	1	1
PF	12	(Italy) Alessandro Frosini	6	5	2
C	15	(United States) Rashard Griffith	18	6	1
Reserves:			P	R	A
PG	7	(Italy) Alessandro Abbio (C)	15	2	1
SG	8	(Italy) Davide Bonora	0	0	0
PF	11	(Italy) Fabrizio Ambrassa	0	1	0
PF	13	(Australia) David Andersen	2	3	1
PF	18	(Slovenia) Matjaž Smodiš	9	5	0
Head coach:
(Italy) Ettore Messina

=== Game 5 ===
10 May 2001
20:30

Report

Kinder Bologna (Italy)	82–74	(Spain) TAU Cerámica
Scoring by quarter: 19–18, 23–19, 20–15, 20–22
Pts: Rigaudeau 18; Rebs: Griffith 10; Asts: Ginóbili 6		Pts: Bennett 24; Rebs: Bennett 5 Asts: Bennett 5

PalaMalaguti, Bologna
Attendance: 8,278
Referees: Coelho (POR), Tsanidis (GRE), Stokes (ENG)

Kinder Bologna	TAU Cerámica

Starters:			P	R	A
PG	14	(France) Antoine Rigaudeau	18	1	1
SG	6	(Argentina) Manu Ginóbili	16	4	6
SF	19	(Serbia and Montenegro) Marko Jarić	16	4	1
PF	12	(Italy) Alessandro Frosini	4	6	1
C	15	(United States) Rashard Griffith	14	10	0
Reserves:			P	R	A
PG	7	(Italy) Alessandro Abbio (C)	4	1	0
SG	8	(Italy) Davide Bonora	1	2	0
C	11	(Italy) Fabrizio Ambrassa	DNP		
PF	13	(Australia) David Andersen	4	2	0
PF	18	(Slovenia) Matjaž Smodiš	5	2	0
Head coach:
(Italy) Ettore Messina

Kinder Bologna	TAU Cerámica
3	2

2000–01 Euroleague
Champions

Kinder Bologna
2nd continental title

Starters:			P	R	A
PG	6	(United States) Elmer Bennett	24	5	5
SG	7	(France) Laurent Foirest	6	4	1
SF	11	(Lithuania) Saulius Štombergas	3	2	0
PF	14	(Argentina) Fabricio Oberto	15	4	0
C	13	(United States) Victor Alexander	8	3	0
Reserves:			P	R	A
PF	4	(Argentina) Luis Scola	7	4	1
SF	5	(Spain) Dani García	2	1	0
SF	9	(Spain) Sergi Vidal (C)	2	2	0
PF	10	(Lithuania) Mindaugas Timinskas	7	2	0
Head coach:
(Serbia and Montenegro) Duško Ivanović

== Awards ==
=== Euroleague Finals MVP ===
- (Argentina) Manu Ginóbili ( (Italy) Kinder Bologna)

=== Euroleague Finals Top Scorer ===
- (15.4 points per game):
- (Argentina) Manu Ginóbili ( (Italy) Kinder Bologna)
- (United States) Elmer Bennett ( (Spain) TAU Cerámica)
- (United States) Victor Alexander ( (Spain) TAU Cerámica)
