= Kavak (company) =

Mexican online car platform

- Type: Private
- Industry: E-commerce, Financial technology, Car sales
- Founded: 2016; 10 years ago
- Founder: Carlos García Ottati
- Headquarters: Mexico City, Mexico
- Area served: Mexico, Argentina, Brazil, Chile, Oman and United Arab Emirates (Formerly, Colombia, Peru, Saudi Arabia, and Turkey) (Note: Operations in Colombia and Peru were suspended on 1 January 2024. The Turkish subsidiary was sold in 2025.)
- Key people: Carlos García Ottati (CEO)
- Products: Purchase and sale of new and used vehicles, automotive financing, maintenance services, personal credit
- Website: www.kavak.com/mx

Kavak is a Mexican company that operates a platform for buying, selling, financing, and managing new and used cars and commercial vehicles, for both individuals and businesses.

It was founded in 2016 and is headquartered in Mexico City. Its founder and CEO is Carlos García Ottati.

== History ==
Initial fundraising began in 2016, and was conducted through the Mountain Nazca fund. This investment vehicle provided the support needed to hold a first round for MXN$3 million, at that time the biggest seed-stage investment ever completed. The team raised nearly MXN$400 million in three funding rounds between 2016 and 2020, with Kaszek Venture, Mountain Nazca, and SoftBank taking point. Those investments pushed Kavak to a US$1 billion valuation by the end of 2020, making it Mexico's first unicorn company.

Kavak expanded to Argentina in 2020 after it merged with local startup Checkars.

The company later expanded to Brazil at the start of 2021. It achieved a unicorn ranking as the second-most valuable business in Latin America after raising US$700 million in a Series E round that valued the company at $8.7 billion.

In July 2022, the company announced plans to enter Chile, Colombia, and Peru.

Kavak began operating in Turkey in May 2022 under the Carvak brand. In 2025, it sold Carvak to Borusan Next, the used-car business of Borusan Otomotiv. Turkey's Competition Authority approved the transaction on 18 September 2025. In October 2022, Kavak announced its launch in the United Arab Emirates, Oman and Saudi Arabia. In Saudi Arabia, it planned its own operation, with two operational centres in Riyadh. Its operations in the United Arab Emirates and Oman began after a merger with Carzaty, an Omani used-car platform.

In November 2023, Kavak announced it would indefinitely suspend its operations in Colombia and Peru starting January 1, 2024, citing the global and local macroeconomic context.

In January 2025, Kavak reported a share of about 1.2% of the used-car market in Mexico, which it estimated at around US$5 million transactions a year. In November 2025, Kavak launched Kavak Crédito, a credit platform in Mexico.

In February 2026, Kavak raised US$300 million in a Series F round led by Andreessen Horowitz, which contributed US$200 million. WCM Investment Management co-led the round.

== Services ==
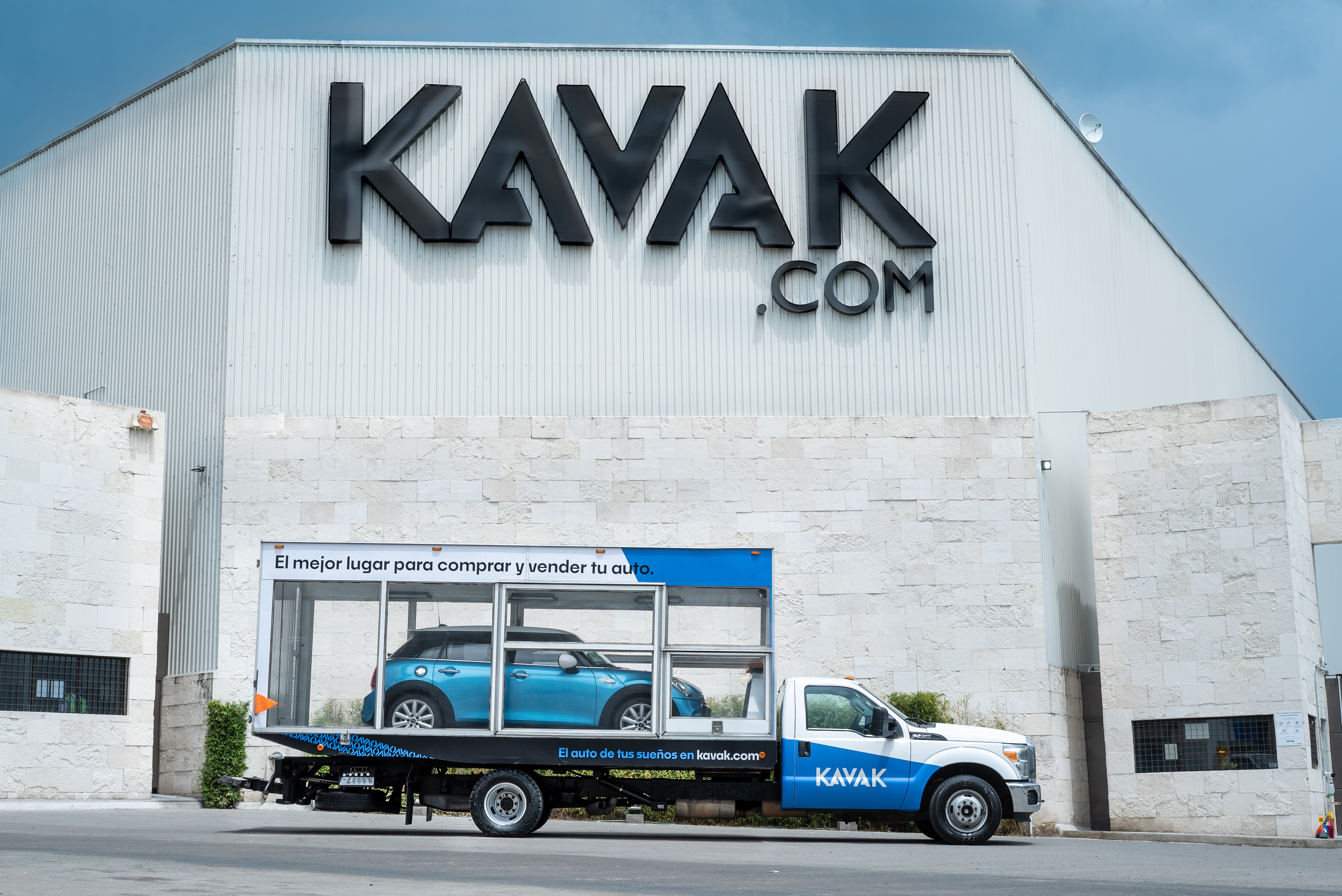
Kavak main headquarters.

Kavak offers new and used cars, car maintenance, and personal credit intermediary services. The company continued to grow its financial segment, initially from Kavak Capital, and then from two new brands: Kuna and Kavak Crédito.

It uses data and AI to create an algorithm that collects public auto-industry information and internal data to calculate the prices that will be fair for car buyers and sellers. Through thousands of runs, the algorithm learned to project market trends and assess users' ability to pay, which allowed the company to provide personalized financing options and offers of vehicles.

In the State of Mexico, Kavak has a vehicle reconditioning facility, which can recondition over 3,500 vehicles per month. It involves technical check-ups, repair, and quality certification to ensure that the vehicles are up to the standards.

== Investors and alliances ==
Kavak has received investments from some major organizations, such as Sea, Softbank, Founders Fund, Tiger Global, General Catalyst, Spruce House, Ribbit Capital, and the D1 hedge fund.

Among the individual investors, the Argentine athlete Manu Ginóbili stands out.

Kavak has entered into various business deals, such as the partnership with the Mexican Football Federation (FMF) and the Argentine Football Association (AFA), as well as the partnership with Uber to provide self-financing services. In February 2024, Kavak took over the sponsorship of the CONCACAF Champions Cup (CCC). In December 2025, Kavak was announced as an official commercial partner of the National Football League (NFL).

== Social impact ==
The company has put in place a program known as "Talentos únicos", an initiative to recruit and train older people in conjunction with the National Institute for Older Persons (INAPAM).

Kavak has established three committees focused on the rights of its employees: one for women, one for racial minorities, and one for the LGBTQ community.

== Recognition ==
- In 2018, Kavak was named Entrepreneur of the Year by Expansión magazine.
- In 2023, Kavak advanced the most out of all the listed companies in Expansión magazine's "The 500 Most Important Companies of Mexico" list, jumping 93 places to 322 from 415.
- Kavak has been recognized by the Federal Consumer Protection Agency (PROFECO) for its conciliation processes.
