= Marcos Galperin =

Argentine businessman (born 1967)

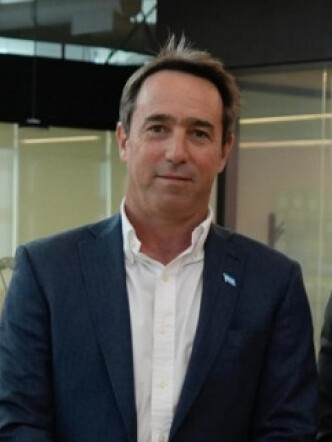
- Galperin in 2024.
- Born: Marcos Eduardo Galperin Lebach; 31 October 1971 (age 55); Buenos Aires, Argentina
- Education: University of Pennsylvania; Stanford University
- Occupations: Entrepreneur, executive
- Known for: Co-founder of Mercado Libre
- Title: Executive Chairman (designate), former CEO of Mercado Libre
- Spouse: Karina
- Children: 3
- Parent(s): Silvia Julia Lebach; Ernesto Galperin
- Awards: Premio Konex

Marcos Eduardo Galperin (Spanish pronunciation: [ˈmaɾkos eˈðwaɾðo ɣalpeˈɾin]; born October 31, 1971) is an Argentine businessman and technology entrepreneur, best known as co-founder of MercadoLibre. He led the company as Chief Executive Officer for more than two decades and became Executive Chairman on January 1, 2026. With an estimated net worth of about US$7.1 billion, as of September 2026, he is widely regarded as Argentina’s richest individual.

== Early life and education ==
Marcos Eduardo Galperin was born on October 31, 1971 in Buenos Aires, Argentina to a wealthy family of Jewish descent. He is the fourth of five sons of Ernesto Galperin and Silvia Julia Lebach. His family owned SADESA, one of the world’s largest leather manufacturing companies.

Galperin attended St. Andrew's Scots School in Olivos, where he played rugby and joined tours to Australia and New Zealand. He later studied finance at the Wharton School in the United States, graduating with a BA in 1994. After returning to Argentina to work briefly – including at YPF – he completed an MBA at Stanford University in Palo Alto, California in 1999.

He married Karina on March 11, 2000, and they have three children. Since 2002, he has lived mainly in Uruguay, dividing his time between Montevideo and Punta del Este. He briefly returned to Argentina during the Macri administration (2015–2019), but later moved back to Uruguay for its business-friendly environment.

He is a supporter of Club Atlético Independiente.

== Career ==
In 1999, while at Stanford University, Galperin co-founded Mercado Libre with classmates and mentors from the Graduate School of Business. Originally designed as a Latin American version of eBay, it grew into a leading regional platform for e-commerce and fintech, including Mercado Pago (payments), Mercado Crédito (loans), Mercado Envíos (logistics) and Mercado Ads (marketing).

Under his leadership, Mercado Libre became Latin America’s largest publicly listed technology company. He has been recognised with the Konex Award (2008) and the Platinum Konex Award (2018) as one of Argentina’s most influential business figures.

He also served on the board of Globant until 2020. In 2023, he co-founded the Miami Sharks, a professional rugby union team based in Miami, Florida, and became one of its principal investors. He also appears in the directory of Peter Thiel's Dialog organization.

=== Leadership transition ===
On May 21, 2025, Mercado Libre announced that Galperin would step down as CEO at the end of the year after 26 years in the role. Ariel Szarfsztejn, head of the commerce division, will succeed him as CEO on January 1, 2026, while Galperin becomes Executive Chairman.

In a letter to employees, he said he would remain focused on long-term strategy, capital allocation, corporate culture and AI-driven innovation. Media coverage in 2025 highlighted Mercado Libre’s investment in artificial intelligence for credit risk, payments and logistics.
