= Ualá =

Argentine financial services company

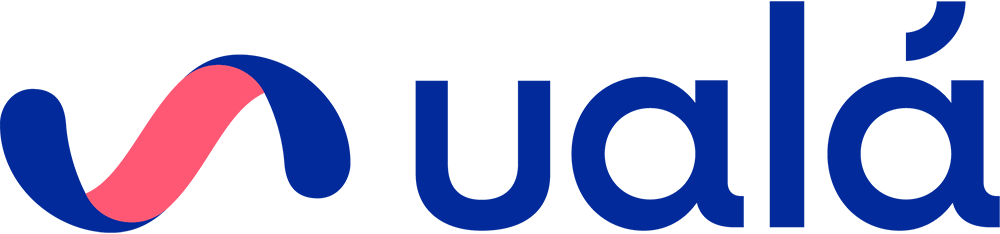
- Industry: Financial technology
- Founder: Pierpaolo Barbieri
- Products: Mobile payment app, prepaid debit card
- Website: Official website

Ualá is an Argentine fintech company that provides a mobile application for managing a Mastercard prepaid debit card and other financial services. The company was founded by Pierpaolo Barbieri and investors include Point72 Ventures. Competitors include Argentine digital bank Brubank, which provides transaction account services through its app.

As with other prepaid debit cards, the account holder pre-loads money onto the card and a bank account is not required. While Ualá’s primary product is its mobile app, the company operates within the larger fintech sector, addressing the need for digital financial inclusion in Latin America. Lost or stolen Mastercard prepaid debit cards can be frozen from within the app.

In 2024, Allianz X, the strategic investment arm of Allianz, led a $366 million Series E raise, valuing the company at $2.75 billion. In January 2026, Ualá and Allianz launched fully digital life and personal accident insurance products embedded within the app, generating over 300,000 quotes within weeks. In March 2026, Ualá secured an additional $195 million in equity financing, bringing the company's valuation to $3.2 billion.
