= Pierpaolo Barbieri =

Argentine businessman (born 1987)

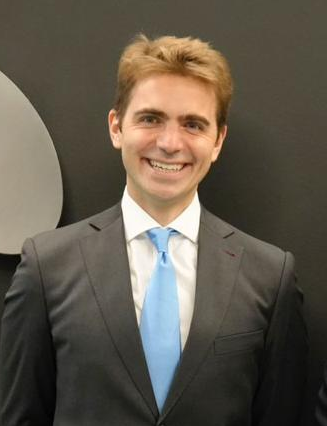
- Born: 17 May 1987 (age 39); Buenos Aires, Argentina
- Education: Harvard University (AB); University of Cambridge (MPhil)
- Occupations: Businessman; economic historian; researcher
- Known for: Founder of Ualá, Executive Director at Greenmantle

Pierpaolo Barbieri (born 17 May 1987) is an Argentine economic historian, researcher, executive director at Greenmantle, founder of Ualá an Argentina-based personal financial management mobile app, and 17Sigma an early stage Latin American focused Venture Capital firm. He is also the author of the book Hitler’s Shadow Empire: The Nazis and the Spanish Civil War.

== Academic and professional career ==
Pierpaolo Barbieri grew up in Buenos Aires, Argentina. His father is from Calabria and his mother is Argentine. He studied at Harvard University, publishing for his honors thesis the book Hitler's Shadow Empire: The Nazis and the Spanish Civil War, on the economic ties between Adolf Hitler's Germany and Francisco Franco's Spain, which was awarded the Thomas T. Hoopes '14 Prize The research was conducted with the support of the Weatherhead Center for International Affairs, the Minda de Gunzburg Center for European Studies and the Real Colegio Complutense.

Upon graduation, he studied at Cambridge, where he was awarded a DPhil in economic history. Between 2011 and 2013, he was researcher and became Ernest May Fellow at the Harvard Kennedy School and Strategic Advisor at the Institute for New Economic Thinking (INET). He was also special advisor to the Berggruen Council on the Future of Europe.

As an economic analyst, he has published articles in newspapers and magazines such as the Spanish newspaper El País.

He is executive director at Greenmantle, a macroeconomic and geopolitical consulting firm, and was head strategist of the Brevan Howard Argentina Fund.

Pierpaolo Barbieri has maintained cordial and collaborative relations with Javier Milei, as evidenced by the latter's speeches delivered at Ualá's newly established corporate headquarters in Buenos Aires in November 2024, during which the Argentine president expressed his admiration for the firm's achievements. In July 2025, Javier Milei hosted Pierpaolo Barbieri at the Casa Rosada presidential residence, accompanied by Scottish historian Niall Ferguson. Barbieri has publicly supported some of Javier Milei's policies, including geopolitical realignments with the United States and the benefits that macroeconomic stability can provide to credit and economic growth.

== Ualá ==
In 2017, Barbieri founded Ualá, an Argentina-based personal financial management mobile app that allows users to conduct transactions, such as money transfers, payments and purchases, without having a bank account.

Ualá has initiated efforts to expand into the Mexican market, by the way of a not yet finalized acquisition of a Mexican Bank ABC Capital; the acquisition is pending regulatory approvals from Mexican banking and financial authorities. Ualá has been the subject of complaints from users who allege they were victims of financial scams via the app. Barbieri has contested the claims.
