= Carlos Done =

American-Ukrainian basketball player

Kepler Basketball Club
- League: Rwanda Basketball League

Personal information
- Born: February 25, 1997 (age 29) Kyiv, Ukraine
- Listed height: 6 ft 7 in (2.01 m)
- Listed weight: 205 lb (93 kg)

Career information
- High school: Walton Campus (Bronx, New York); Perth Amboy High School (Perth Amboy, New Jersey)
- College: ASA College (2016–2017); Harford Community College (2017–2018)
- Playing career: 2019–present
- Position: Shooting guard

Career history
- 2019: Club San Carlos
- 2019–2020: Laguneros de La Comarca
- 2020–2022: BC Budivelnyk
- 2022: Club San Carlos
- 2022–2023: Al-Karamah SC
- 2024: Kepler BBC
- 2024: Los Prados
- 2025–present: Vanta Black Dragons

Carlos Done (born February 25, 1997) is an American-Ukrainian professional basketball player who plays as a shooting guard. After playing college basketball for ASA College and Harford Community College, he began his professional career with Club San Carlos in the Dominican Republic in 2019. He later played for Laguneros de La Comarca in Mexico and BC Budivelnyk in the Ukrainian Basketball SuperLeague, winning the Ukrainian Cup with Budivelnyk in 2021.

== Early life and college career ==
Done was born in Kyiv, Ukraine, in 1997. He played high school basketball for Perth Amboy High School, where he was a shooting guard and later received all-division and all-tournament recognition.

In 2017, Done enrolled at ASA College in Brooklyn, New York. After one season, he transferred to Harford Community College, where he won the Maryland Junior College Athletic Conference tournament and finished as a runner-up in the National Junior College Athletic Association Division I competition.

== Professional career ==
Done chose to forgo his final two years of college eligibility and began his professional career with Club San Carlos in Santo Domingo, competing in the Torneo Superior de Baloncesto.

Later in 2019, Done signed with Laguneros de La Comarca of the Liga Nacional de Baloncesto Profesional.

From 2020 to 2022, Done played for BC Budivelnyk of the Ukrainian Basketball SuperLeague. He was part of the team that won the Ukrainian Cup in 2021. His time with the club was interrupted following the Russian invasion of Ukraine in 2022.

In January 2023, Done joined Al-Karamah SC of the Syrian Basketball League.

In March 2024, Done signed with Kepler Basketball Club of the Rwanda Basketball League.
