= Donté Greene =

American basketball player (born 1988)

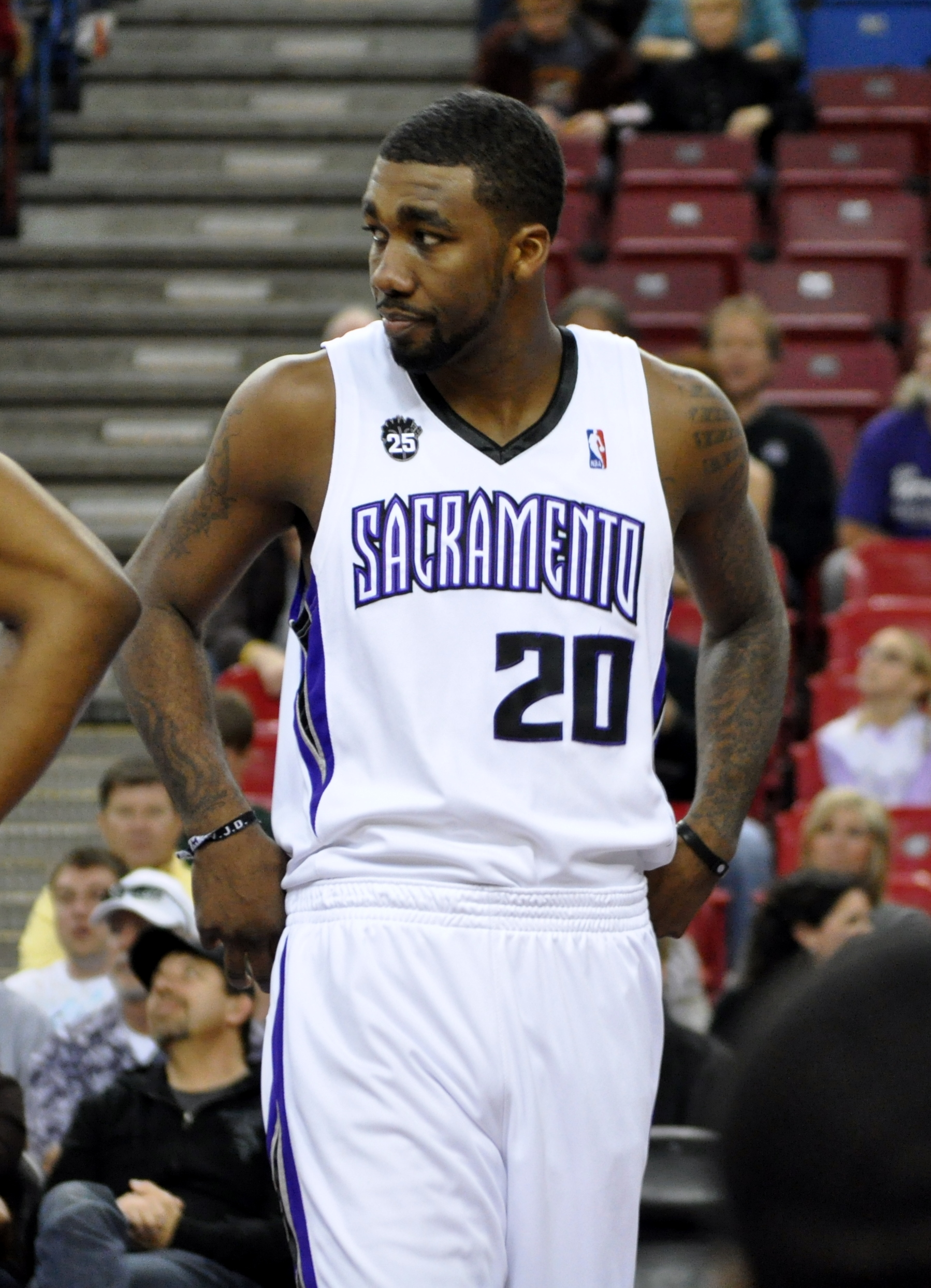
- Greene with the Kings

Personal information
- Born: February 21, 1988 (age 38) Munich, Bavaria, West Germany
- Listed height: 6 ft 11 in (2.11 m)
- Listed weight: 226 lb (103 kg)

Career information
- High school: Towson Catholic (Towson, Maryland)
- College: Syracuse (2007–2008)
- NBA draft: 2008: 1st round, 28th overall pick
- Drafted by: Memphis Grizzlies
- Playing career: 2008–2021

Career history
- 2008–2012: Sacramento Kings
- 2009: →Reno Bighorns
- 2013: Atléticos de San Germán
- 2013–2014: Dongguan Leopards
- 2014–2015: Al Nasr Dubai
- 2015–2016: Al Sharjah
- 2016: Ohud Medina
- 2016: Leones de Santo Domingo
- 2017: Capitanes de Arecibo
- 2017: TNT KaTropa
- 2017: Leones de Santo Domingo
- 2017–2018: Al Riyadi Club Beirut
- 2018: Leones de Santo Domingo
- 2019: Champville SC
- 2020: Al-Ahli Jeddah
- 2020: Caribbean Storm Islands
- 2021: Ezzahra Sports
- 2021: Club San Carlos

Career highlights
- Second-team All-Big East (2008); Big East All-Freshman Team (2008); First-team Parade All-American (2007); McDonald's All-American (2007)
- Stats at NBA.com
- Stats at Basketball Reference
Medals
Men's basketball
Representing United States
FIBA U19 World Championship
Silver medal – second place	2007 Serbia	Team competition
FIBA Americas U18 Championship
Gold medal – first place	2006 San Antonio	Team competition

Donté Dominic Greene (born February 21, 1988) is a current American semi-professional basketball player for the Vermont Coyotes of the American Basketball Association. He played college basketball for the Syracuse Orange for one year before being selected with the 28th overall pick by the Memphis Grizzlies in the 2008 NBA draft.

== Early life ==
Greene was born on the United States Air Force Base in Munich, Germany. His mother worked for the National Security Agency. In the mid-1990s, Greene's parents divorced. Greene then attended school in Japan before returning to Germany and eventually Hanover, Pennsylvania. In October 2001, Greene's mother died of a heart attack, and Greene moved to Woodlawn, Baltimore County, Maryland with his father and brother.

Greene was named as a 2006 USA Men's U18 National Team member on June 26, 2006. He averaged 3.5 points and 1.0 rebounds per game as the USA captured a 4–0 mark and the gold medal at the 2006 FIBA Americas U18 Championship for Men in San Antonio, Texas.

He was a 2007 McDonald's All-American, Maryland's 2007 Gatorade Player of the Year, was named to the Nike Brand All-America Team and selected to play in the 2007 Jordan Classic. In the class of 2007, he ranked as the No. 7 overall recruit and No. 2 power forward by Scout.com and as No. 10 overall and the No. 3 small forward by Rivals.com.

Greene graduated in 2007 from Towson Catholic High School, where he averaged 18.4 points, 6.8 rebounds, 3.0 assists, 2.1 steals and 4.3 blocks per game as a senior in 2006–07, and helped Towson Catholic to a 32–6 record and to its second consecutive Maryland Interscholastic Athletic Association A Conference and Baltimore Catholic League titles.

Greene again played on Team USA in the 2007 USA Basketball U19 World Championships. Although he was slowed by a shoulder injury, Greene played in eight-of-nine contests and averaged 4.3 points and 1.5 rebounds. The team took home the silver medal after losing to Serbia in the championship game.

== College career ==
In his freshman year of college, Greene started all 35 games he appeared in and led Syracuse in scoring with 17.7 points to go along with 7.2 rebounds per game. He became the first Syracuse freshmen since Carmelo Anthony to lead Syracuse in scoring, while setting a new SU freshmen record for 3-pointers in one season, notching 90, surpassing Gerry McNamara, who previously held the record with 85. Greene also led Syracuse with 57 blocks. He was named to the Big East All-Rookie Team.

Greene had 19 points and 13 rebounds in an 85–73 Syracuse victory over Seton Hall on March 5, 2008. Greene also scored a season-high 27 points in an 87–81 NIT win over Robert Morris on March 18, 2008.

Greene struggled in Big East play, where he shot just 28.6 percent (40-for-140) from downtown. While he led Syracuse in scoring, he also took more shots than anyone on the team, and had more turnovers (91) than assists (71). He was also criticized for his poor shot selection and porous defense. Greene and Jonny Flynn were the country's second-highest scoring freshman duo. In April 2008, Greene declared himself eligible for the NBA draft.

== Professional career ==
In the pick that they received from the Los Angeles Lakers as part of the Pau Gasol trade, the Memphis Grizzlies selected Greene with the 28th overall pick in the 2008 NBA draft. He was later traded by Memphis to the Houston Rockets. Greene signed with the Rockets on July 15, 2008, and proceeded to score 40 points in his summer league debut at the Thomas & Mack Center in Las Vegas. He hit 12–20 field goals, including 5-of-10 threes, to go along with 11-of-12 free throws. On August 14, 2008, Greene was traded to the Sacramento Kings.

On January 10, 2009, Greene was assigned to the Reno Bighorns of the NBA Development League. He was the first player the Kings had ever sent to the D-League. In his first game with Reno, he scored 26 points in a 93–91 Bighorns win over the Bakersfield Jam. After performances of 14, 18, and 16 points in his next three games, he scored 28 points, with 14 scored in the final quarter, in a 117–103 win over the Utah Flash on January 17. Greene was recalled by the Kings that same day.

On March 11, 2013, Greene signed with the Atléticos de San Germán of Puerto Rico for the 2013 BSN season. On April 5, 2013, he left Atléticos after just one game.

On April 17, 2013, Greene signed with the Memphis Grizzlies for the remainder of the season. In July 2013, he joined the Grizzlies for the 2013 NBA Summer League.

On August 15, 2013, he was traded to the Boston Celtics in exchange for Fab Melo. He was waived by the Celtics on September 17, 2013. Later that month, he signed with the Dongguan Leopards of China for the 2013–14 season, and joined the Leopards for their tour of New Zealand. He scored 41 points in their first of three games against the New Zealand Breakers.

In July 2014, Greene joined the Brooklyn Nets for the 2014 NBA Summer League. In December 2014, he joined Dubai's club Al-Nasr for the 2014–15 season. The next season, he also played in the UAE National Basketball League, but with Al Sharjah. In May 2016, he signed with Ohud Medina of the Saudi Premier League.

In August 2016, Greene signed with the Leones de Santo Domingo. He led his team to the LNB Championship in the Dominican Republic.

On January 10, 2017, he signed with the Capitanes de Arecibo of Puerto Rico.

On September 3, 2017, he signed with Sporting Al Riyadi Beirut of the Lebanese Basketball League.

In October 2019, Greene joined Champville SC of the Lebanese Basketball League.

In January 2020, Greene joined Al-Ahli Jeddah of Saudi Basketball League.

On March 1, 2021, Greene signed with Ezzahra Sports of the Championnat Pro A.

On May 31, 2021, Greene signed with Club San Carlos of the Torneo Superior de Baloncesto (TBS).

On October 7, 2021, Greene signed with Taichung Wagor Suns of T1 League. Greene didn't come to Taiwan because his passport expired.

On August 19th 2026, Greene signed with Vermont Coyotes of American Basketball Association.

== The Basketball Tournament (TBT) ==
In the summer of 2017, Greene competed in The Basketball Tournament on ESPN for Boeheim's Army; a team composed of Syracuse University basketball alum. In four games, he averaged 14.0 points and 4.8 rebounds per game to help lead Boeheim's Army to the Semifinal Round where they fell 81–77 to the eventual champions Overseas Elite. Greene also played one game for Boeheim's Army in 2016.

== NBA career statistics ==
Legend
GP	Games played	GS	Games started	MPG	Minutes per game
FG%	Field goal percentage	3P%	3-point field goal percentage	FT%	Free throw percentage
RPG	Rebounds per game	APG	Assists per game	SPG	Steals per game
BPG	Blocks per game	PPG	Points per game	**Bold**	Career high

=== Regular season ===
Year	Team	GP	GS	MPG	FG%	3P%	FT%	RPG	APG	SPG	BPG	PPG
2008–09	Sacramento	55	4	13.2	.326	.260	**.853**	1.6	.5	.3	.3	3.8
2009–10	Sacramento	**76**	**50**	**21.4**	**.441**	**.377**	.643	**3.1**	**.9**	**.5**	**.7**	**8.5**
2010–11	Sacramento	69	21	16.3	.404	.292	.662	2.1	.7	**.5**	.3	5.8
2011–12	Sacramento	53	7	14.7	.406	.238	.800	2.5	.6	.3	.5	5.4
Career		253	82	16.8	.406	.304	.701	2.4	.7	.4	.5	6.1

== Arrest ==
In November 2022, Greene was arrested for attempted robbery in Goshen, Indiana.
