= José Nuñez de Cáceres Avenue =

Major road in Santo Domingo

José Núñez de Cáceres Avenue
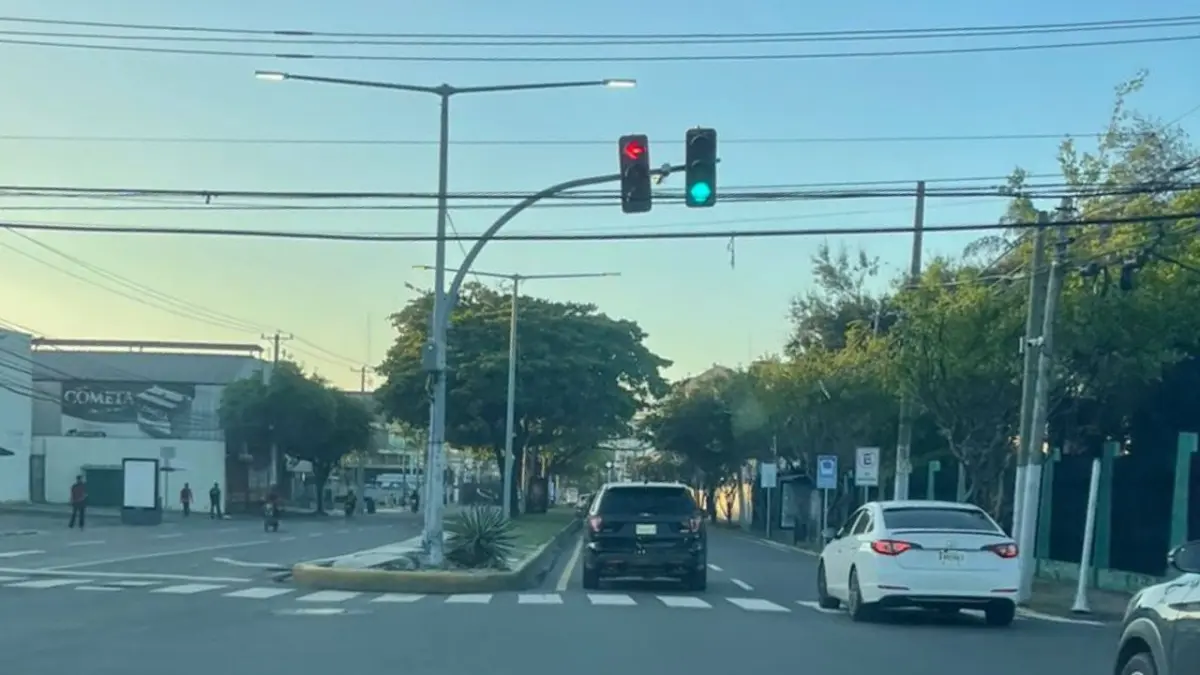
- Avenida Nuñez de Cáceres highlighted in red
- Type: Avenue
- Maintained by: Ministry of Public Works and Communications (MOPC in spanish)
- Length: 5.4 km (3.4 mi)
- Location: Distrito Nacional, Dominican Republic
- Nearest metro station: Pedro Fransisco Bonó; Bus Núñez de Cáceres Corridor
- North end: John F. Kennedy Expressway
- Major junctions: Clara Pardo Street in San Jerónimo; Font Bernard Street in San Jerónimo; Olof Palme Street in San Jerónimo; Celeste W. y Gil Street in Los Prados; Gustavo M. Ricart Avenue in La Castellana; César A. Canó Street in La Castellana; Guarocuya Street in El Millón; Francisco P. Ramírez Street in El Millón; 27 de Febrero Expressway; Rómulo Betancourt Avenue in Bella Vista; Sarasota Avenue in Bella Vista; Anacaona Avenue; Mirador Sur Park; Independencia Avenue
- South end: Autopista 30 de Mayo

Construction
- Inauguration: 1974 (extended in 1988)
Nearby arterial roads
← Gregorio Luperón Avenue	Dr. Defilló Avenue →

José Nuñez de Cáceres Avenue is one of the main north–south avenues within the Distrito Nacional. The avenue serves as a local road for residential areas in the city center such as El Millón, San Jerónimo and Los Prados, and is a major road artery within Santo Domingo. Originally built in 1974, and extended in 1988, the avenue is 21 meters wide, with 2 lanes in each direction, unlike other neighboring avenues such as Winston Churchill Avenue, since it was originally designed in a suburban environment. The avenue is part of a network of north-south avenues throughout the Distrito Nacional.

== History ==
=== First section ===
The first section of Nuñez de Cáceres Avenue was officially opened on June 23, 1974, under the administration of Joaquín Balaguer, along 4.1 kilometers, from John F. Kennedy avenue to Anacaona avenue. It was originally designed with two lanes in each direction, as it was conceived as a suburban avenue, unlike other neighboring avenues such as Winston Churchill avenue and Abraham Lincoln Avenue. The avenue is part of a north–south network of avenues built by Joaquín Balaguer throughout the Distrito Nacional, from Gregorio Luperón avenue to Máximo Gómez avenue.

=== Second section ===
In 1987–1988, the second section of Avenida Nuñez de Cáceres was built under the administration of Joaquín Balaguer. This short, 1.3-kilometer expressway includes an interchange with Anacaona avenue, a tunnel beneath Mirador Sur Park, exits and an interchange at Independencia avenue, and a trumpet interchange at Autopista 30 de Mayo, where the route ends. This, along with the V Centenario Expressway, were the first expressways built in the city of Santo Domingo.

== Route ==
The Núñez de Cáceres avenue begins at John F. Kennedy expressway. At this intersection, the John F. Kennedy route passes over as an elevated highway with three lanes in each direction, inaugurated in 2012 by Leonel Fernández. The avenue stretches for 2.9 kilometers, with frequent traffic lights at intersections in residential neighborhoods such as Los Prados, Las Praderas, La Castellana, El Millón, and San Jerónimo. At the intersection with Gustavo Mejía Ricart avenue is the Parque Ambiental Nuñez de Cáceres, inaugurated in 2007 and currently undergoing renovations. Nuñez de Cáceres Avenue intersects with 27 de Febrero route. At this intersection, the 27 de Febrero expressway is a grade-separated interchange with two lanes in each direction, also inaugurated by Leonel Fernández in 2011. The road continues south for 1.1 km, crossing Rómulo Betancourt and Sarasota avenues. At the intersection with Rómulo Betancourt avenue, in the Bella Vista sector, is Downtown Center, a large shopping mall in the area. In total, this section is 4.1 kilometers long.

=== Nuñez de Cáceres Tunnel ===
The Núñez de Cáceres Tunnel, built in 1987–1988, runs through Mirador Sur Park. It is 230 meters long and connects the northern part of the park (Anacaona avenue) to the southern part (Cayetano Germosén avenue). Above the tunnel is the Mirador del Sur Plaza, a large recreational area.

=== Expressway section ===
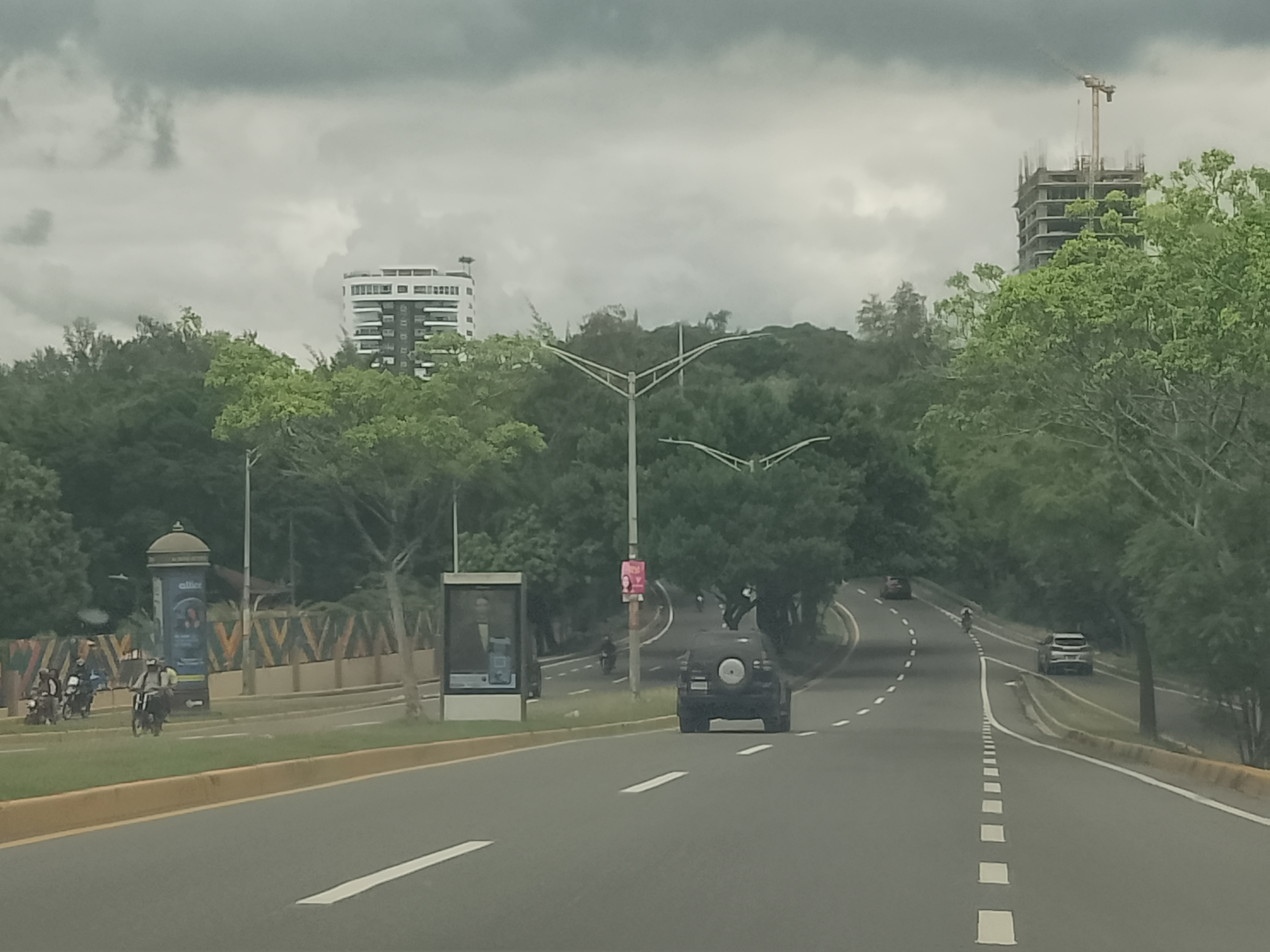
Núñez de Cáceres avenue immediately after crossing Independence Avenue

Nuñez de Cáceres avenue features a cloverleaf interchange and several exits at its connection with Anacaona avenue. The entrance to the Nuñez de Cáceres Tunnel, which passes under Mirador Sur Park, is also located here. After exiting the tunnel, it connects with Independencia venue via a system of exits and a cloverleaf interchange leading from Independencia avenue to Nuñez de Cáceres avenue. Nuñez de Cáceres avenue then serves as an expressway between the Feria Ganadera and the former Metaldom facility. The avenue ends at the Autopista 30 de Mayo (DR-2) at a trumpet interchange. This section is 1.3 kilometers long.

== Nuñez de Cáceres Corridor ==
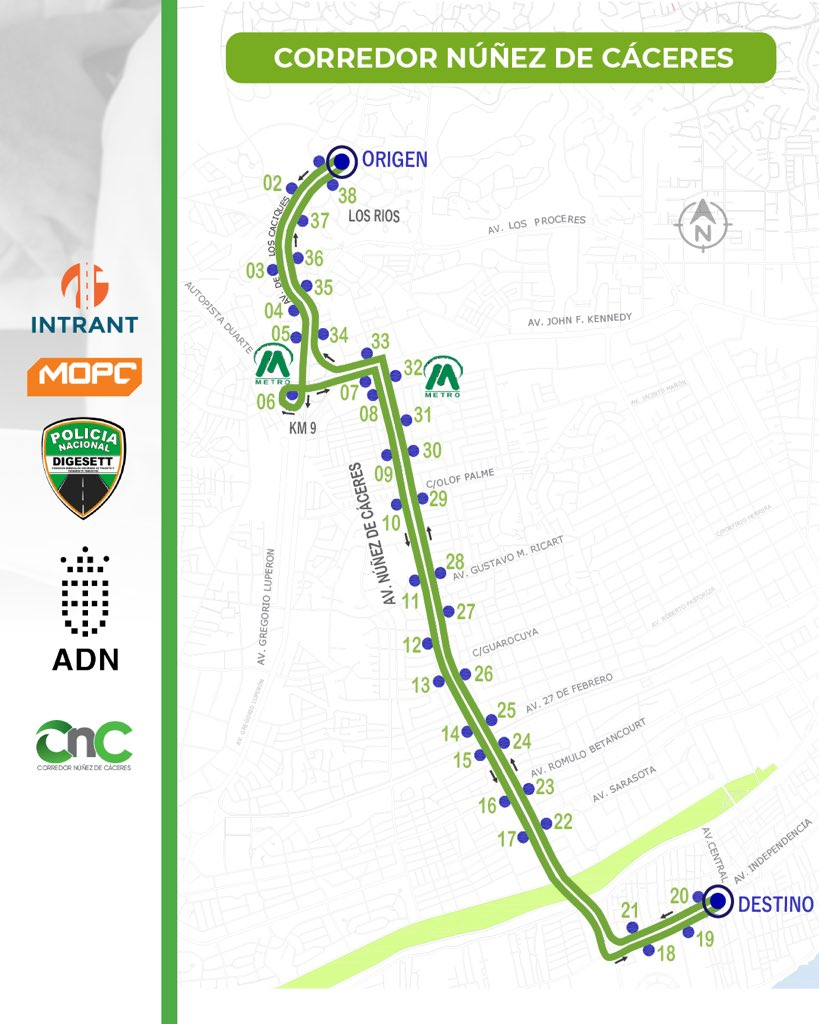

Nuñez de Cáceres avenue has a bus corridor, opened in January 2021, that runs from Los Ríos to Independencia Avenue. The corridor is operated by the CONATRA consortium and is part of a network of corridors opened by INTRANT throughout Santo Domingo, operated by motorcycle taxi consortiums.
