= 2013 NBA Summer League =

- League: National Basketball Association
- Sport: Basketball
- Duration: July 7–22, 2013
- Games: 86 total games Orlando Pro Summer League-25; Las Vegas Summer League-61
- Teams: Orlando-10; Las Vegas-22
- TV partner: NBA TV

Orlando Pro Summer League
- Season champions: Oklahoma City Thunder
- Runners-up: Houston Rockets
- Top scorer: Reggie Jackson

Las Vegas NBA Summer League
- Season champions: Golden State Warriors
- Runners-up: Phoenix Suns
- Top seed: Golden State Warriors
- Season MVP: Jonas Valančiūnas (league); Ian Clark (championship game)
- Top scorer: Dwight Buycks

NBA Summer League seasons
- ← 2012 2014 →

The 2013 NBA Summer League was a pro basketball league run by the NBA just after the 2013 NBA draft. It gave newly drafted players a chance to test their skills against each other, and to give them a feel for professional basketball. All 30 NBA teams participated, along with the D-League Select. The Miami Heat were the only team to participate in both Summer Leagues. It ran from July 7–12 in Orlando and July 12–22 in Las Vegas. Jeremy Lamb of the Oklahoma City Thunder was named the Most Valuable Player of the Orlando Summer League. Jonas Valančiūnas of the Toronto Raptors went on to be named the Most Valuable Player of the Las Vegas Summer League. Ian Clark of the Golden State Warriors was named the Most Valuable Player of the Las Vegas Summer League Championship Game.

== Orlando Pro Summer League ==
=== Teams ===
- Orlando Magic (host)
- Brooklyn Nets
- Boston Celtics
- Detroit Pistons
- Houston Rockets
- Indiana Pacers
- Miami Heat
- Oklahoma City Thunder
- Philadelphia 76ers
- Utah Jazz

=== Schedule ===
All times are in Eastern Daylight Time (UTC−4)

==== Day 1 ====
NBA TV

July 7
9:00 am

Boxscore

Houston Rockets 88, Philadelphia 76ers 80
Scoring by quarter: 25–15, 23–18, 21–24, 19–23
Pts: Terrence Jones 24; Rebs: Terrence Jones 12; Asts: Patrick Beverley 6	Pts: Michael Carter-Williams 26; Rebs: Michael Carter-Williams 7 Asts: Michael Carter-Williams 8

Amway Center, Orlando, Florida
Referees: Kevin Cutler, Mitchell Ervin, Keith Kimble

NBA TV

July 7
11:00 am

Boxscore

Boston Celtics 88, Orlando Magic 95
Scoring by quarter: 26–22, 16–25, 29–23, 17–25
Pts: Kelly Olynyk 25; Rebs: Fab Melo 8 Asts: Granger, Pressey 4 each	Pts: Oladipo, Osby 18 each Rebs: Kyle O'Quinn 11; Asts: Victor Oladipo 7

Amway Center, Orlando, Florida
Referees: Kane Fitzgerald, Rob Fessler, Ray Acosta

NBA TV

July 7
1:00 pm

Boxscore

Miami Heat 59, Utah Jazz 69
Scoring by quarter: 9–19, 12–13, 16–19, 22–18
Pts: Ian Clark 15; Rebs: Jarvis Varnado 6 Asts: Myck Kabongo 4	Pts: Dionte Christmas 14; Rebs: Trey Burke 7 Asts: Trey Burke 5

Amway Center, Orlando, Florida
Referees: Marat Kogut, William Mensah, Tiffany Bird

NBA TV

July 7
3:00 pm

Boxscore

Oklahoma City Thunder 76, Indiana Pacers 68
Scoring by quarter: 20–12, 12–15, 21–24, 23–17
Pts: Grant Jerrett 17; Rebs: Adams, Lamb 6 each Asts: Dwight Buycks 13	Pts: Orlando Johnson 17; Rebs: Miles Plumlee 9 Asts: Plumlee, Johnson, Sloan 3 each

Amway Center, Orlando, Florida
Referees: Karl Lane, Jason Goldenberg, Crystal Hogan

NBA TV

July 7
5:00 pm

Boxscore

Detroit Pistons 76, Brooklyn Nets 67
Scoring by quarter: 22–17, 13–19, 17–14, 24–17
Pts: Khris Middleton 16; Rebs: Andre Drummond 16; Asts: Peyton Siva 6	Pts: Tyshawn Taylor 17; Rebs: Mason Plumlee 14; Asts: Chris Wright 5

Amway Center, Orlando, Florida
Referees: Curtis Blair, Rob Rorke, Dedric Taylor

==== Day 2 ====
NBA TV

July 8
11:00 am

Boxscore

Oklahoma City Thunder 79, Orlando Magic 78
Scoring by quarter: 18–19, 16–19, 14–19, 31–21
Pts: Grant Jerrett 14; Rebs: André Roberson 9 Asts: Dwight Buycks 5	Pts: Andrew Nicholson 19; Rebs: Kyle O'Quinn 9 Asts: Victor Oladipo 5

Amway Center, Orlando, Florida
Referees: Kevin Cutler, Rob Fessler, Keith Kimble

NBA TV

July 8
1:00 pm

Boxscore

Philadelphia 76ers 75, Indiana Pacers 96
Scoring by quarter: 22–30, 21–17, 19–29, 13–20
Pts: Khalif Wyatt 25; Rebs: Arnett Moultrie 9 Asts: Michael Carter-Williams 7	Pts: Solomon Hill 22; Rebs: Miles Plumlee 15; Asts: Solomon Hill 4

Amway Center, Orlando, Florida
Referees: Kane Fitzgerald, Crystal Hogan, Mitchell Ervin

NBA TV

July 8
3:00 pm

Boxscore

Boston Celtics 93, Detroit Pistons 63
Scoring by quarter: 30–9, 15–21, 25–13, 23–20
Pts: Darius Johnson-Odom 22; Rebs: Holman, Olynyk 6 each Asts: Phil Pressey 4	Pts: Kentavious Caldwell-Pope 11; Rebs: Tony Mitchell 10; Asts: Lucious, Peyton Siva 2 each

Amway Center, Orlando, Florida
Referees: Marat Kogut, Tiffany Bird, Dedric Taylor

NBA TV

July 8
5:00 pm

Boxscore

Brooklyn Nets 86, Miami Heat 93
Scoring by quarter: 20–23, 20–21, 27–25, 19–24
Pts: Tyshawn Taylor 25; Rebs: Mason Plumlee 9 Asts: Lighty, Shengelia 4 each	Pts: Scotty Hopson 22; Rebs: Jarvis Varnado 7 Asts: Cedric Jackson 9

Amway Center, Orlando, Florida
Referees: Pualani Spurlock, William Mensah, Karl Lane, Rob Rorke

==== Day 3 ====
NBA TV

July 9
11:00 am

Boxscore

Indiana Pacers 74, Boston Celtics 76
Scoring by quarter: 20–15, 9–25, 25–20, 20–16
Pts: Solomon Hill 15; Rebs: Miles Plumlee 7 Asts: Flynn, Hill 3 each	Pts: Kelly Olynyk 21; Rebs: Kelly Olynyk 9 Asts: Phil Pressey 5

Amway Center, Orlando, Florida
Referees: Curtis Blair, Crystal Hogan, Dedric Taylor

NBA TV

July 9
1:00 pm

Boxscore

Detroit Pistons 75, Oklahoma City Thunder 79
Scoring by quarter: 18–17, 14–15, 22–11, 21–36
Pts: Kentavious Caldwell-Pope 19; Rebs: Andre Drummond 11; Asts: Peyton Siva 7	Pts: Reggie Jackson 35; Rebs: André Roberson 10; Asts: Dwight Buycks 3

Amway Center, Orlando, Florida
Referees: Kevin Cutler, Tiffany Bird, Keith Kimble

NBA TV

July 9
3:00 pm

Boxscore

Utah Jazz 71, Houston Rockets 85
Scoring by quarter: 13–18, 17–25, 19–26, 22–16
Pts: Alec Burks 18; Rebs: Jeremy Evans 8 Asts: Alec Burks 3	Pts: Anderson, Beverley 11 each Rebs: Jack Cooley 8 Asts: Tyler Honeycutt 4

Amway Center, Orlando, Florida
Referees: Kane Fitzgerald, Rob Fessler, Pualani Spurlock, Mitchell Ervin

NBA TV

July 9
5:00 pm

Boxscore

Miami Heat 94, Orlando Magic 80
Scoring by quarter: 17–13, 25–17, 27–26, 25–24
Pts: James Ennis 19; Rebs: Cedric Jackson 8 Asts: Cedric Jackson 9	Pts: Victor Oladipo 22; Rebs: Victor Oladipo 5 Asts: Kyle O'Quinn 4

Amway Center, Orlando, Florida
Referees: Marat Kogut, Jason Goldenberg, William Mensah

==== Day 4 ====
NBA TV

July 10
11:00 am

Boxscore

Utah Jazz 98, Brooklyn Nets 69
Scoring by quarter: 20–10, 31–19, 25–20, 22–20
Pts: Evans, Roberts 15 each Rebs: Jeremy Evans 9 Asts: Evans, Mahalbašić, McNeal, Neto 3 each	Pts: Chris Wright 20; Rebs: James, Shengelia 5 each Asts: Damion James 4

Amway Center, Orlando, Florida
Referees: Curtis Blair, Tiara Cruse, Pat Adams

NBA TV

July 10
1:00 pm

Boxscore

Oklahoma City Thunder 74, Philadelphia 76ers 62
Scoring by quarter: 19–20, 14–10, 21–15, 20–17
Pts: Jeremy Lamb 32; Rebs: Adams, Reid 5 each Asts: DeAndre Liggins 4	Pts: Rodney Williams 12; Rebs: Arsalan Kazemi 9 Asts: Carter-Williams, Wyatt 5 each

Amway Center, Orlando, Florida
Referees: J. T. Orr, Josue Nieves, Byron Jarrett, Brent Barnaky, Rob Rorke

NBA TV

July 10
3:00 pm

Boxscore

Boston Celtics 78, Houston Rockets 85
Scoring by quarter: 17–24, 23–19, 16–24, 22–18
Pts: Kelly Olynyk 19; Rebs: Kelly Olynyk 10; Asts: Phil Pressey 10	Pts: Terrence Jones 17; Rebs: Robert Covington 10; Asts: Casper Ware 4

Amway Center, Orlando, Florida
Referees: Karl Lane, Rob Rorke, Byron Jarrett, Fatou Cissoko-Stephens, Kevin Scott

==== Day 5 ====
NBA TV

July 11
11:00 am

Boxscore

Indiana Pacers 79, Utah Jazz 73
Scoring by quarter: 23–20, 15–20, 24–15, 17–18
Pts: Justin Harper 13; Rebs: Jordan, Plumlee 7 each Asts: Johnson, Sloan 4 each	Pts: Chris Roberts 18; Rebs: Rudy Gobert 8 Asts: Trey Burke 4

Amway Center, Orlando, Florida
Referees: Scott Twardoski, Jason Goldberg, Pualani Spurlock, James Williams

NBA TV

July 11
1:00 pm

Boxscore

Miami Heat 77, Detroit Pistons 78
Scoring by quarter: 16–18, 25–13, 18–20, 18–27
Pts: Ian Clark 15; Rebs: Cedric Jackson 6 Asts: Jackson, Kennedy, Varnado 3 each	Pts: Andre Drummond 23; Rebs: Andre Drummond 18; Asts: Peyton Siva 9

Amway Center, Orlando, Florida
Referees: James Williams, Tiara Cruse, Byron Jarrett

NBA TV

July 11
3:00 pm

Boxscore

Houston Rockets 92, Brooklyn Nets 76
Scoring by quarter: 25–6, 23–25, 21–25, 23–20
Pts: Covington, Jones 16 each Rebs: Greg Smith 9 Asts: Terrence Jones 7	Pts: James, Scott, Taylor 15 each Rebs: Keith Benson 6 Asts: Tyshawn Taylor 7

Amway Center, Orlando, Florida
Referees: Marat Kogut, Kevin Scott, Fatou Cissoko-Stephens

NBA TV

July 11
5:00 pm

Boxscore

Philadelphia 76ers 89, Orlando Magic 90
Scoring by quarter: 18–27, 27–19, 24–23, 20–21
Pts: Arnett Moultrie 23; Rebs: Arnett Moultrie 12; Asts: Michael Carter-Williams 9	Pts: Victor Oladipo 24; Rebs: Kyle O'Quinn 11; Asts: Victor Oladipo 6

Amway Center, Orlando, Florida
Referees: Haywoode Workman, Josue Nieves, Pat Adams

==== Championship Day ====
===== Seeding =====
The seeding is determined by a team's total points after the first five days. Seven points are awarded in each game: three points for winning a game and one point for every quarter a team won. In the event of a tied quarter, each team are awarder half a point. If two or more teams have equal points, then the following tiebreakers apply:

1. Total point differential
2. Total points allowed
3. Coin flip

Each team is paired with the team that is the closest seed to them, for example: the top two seeds will play in the championship game, the third and fourth seeds will play in the third-place game, etc.

#	Team	GP	W	L	PTS	Tiebreaker Notes
1	Houston Rockets	4	4	0	21	
2	Oklahoma City Thunder	4	4	0	20	
3	Utah Jazz	4	2	2	16	Point differential +19
4	Indiana Pacers	4	2	2	16	Point differential +17
5	Miami Heat	4	2	2	15	Point differential +10
6	Detroit Pistons	4	2	2	15	Point differential -24
7	Boston Celtics	4	2	2	14	
8	Orlando Magic	4	2	2	13	
9	Philadelphia 76ers	4	0	4	6	
10	Brooklyn Nets	4	0	4	4	

===== 9th-place game =====
NBA TV

July 12
4:00 pm

Boxscore

Brooklyn Nets 86, Philadelphia 76ers 89
Scoring by quarter: 26–21, 20–23, 15–17, 25–28
Pts: Plumlee, Wright 23 each Rebs: Keith Benson 16; Asts: Chris Wright 7	Pts: Khalif Wyatt 27; Rebs: Arnett Moultrie 9 Asts: Michael Carter-Williams 5

Amway Center, Orlando, Florida
Referees: Haywoode Workman, Josue Nieves, Jason Goldenberg, Ray Acosta

===== 7th-place game =====
NBA TV

July 12
2:00 pm

Boxscore

Orlando Magic 83, Boston Celtics 102
Scoring by quarter: 14–29, 22–32, 26–17, 21–24
Pts: A. J. Slaughter 25; Rebs: Shane Lawal 6 Asts: A. J. Slaughter 9	Pts: Tony Mitchell 14; Rebs: Kelly Olynyk 7 Asts: Phil Pressey 10

Amway Center, Orlando, Florida
Referees: Kevin Scott, Pualani Spurlock, Byron Jarrett, Haywoode Workman

===== 5th-place game =====
NBA TV

July 12
8:00 am

Boxscore

Detroit Pistons 85, Miami Heat 90
Scoring by quarter: 26–17, 19–22, 23–21, 17–30
Pts: Kentavious Caldwell-Pope 20; Rebs: Andre Drummond 14; Asts: Lucious, Singler 6 each	Pts: Clark, Kennedy 18 each Rebs: Eric Griffin 8 Asts: Cedric Jackson 11

Amway Center, Orlando, Florida
Referees: Scott Twardoski, Tiara Cruse, Brett Nansel, Brandon Hiers

===== 3rd-place game =====
NBA TV

July 12
10:00 am

Boxscore

Indiana Pacers 73, Utah Jazz 70
Scoring by quarter: 19–17, 16–20, 17–22, 21–11
Pts: Orlando Johnson 18; Rebs: Hill, Thiam 6 each Asts: Donald Sloan 6	Pts: Chris Roberts 15; Rebs: Rudy Gobert 10; Asts: Trey Burke 5

Amway Center, Orlando, Florida
Referees: James Williams, Fatou Cissoko-Stephens, Pat Adams

===== Championship game =====
NBA TV

July 12
12:00 pm

Boxscore

Oklahoma City Thunder 85, Houston Rockets 77
Scoring by quarter: 23–20, 23–16, 17–15, 22–26
Pts: Jeremy Lamb 18; Rebs: André Roberson 11; Asts: Lamb, Liggins, Taylor 4 each	Pts: Robert Covington 21; Rebs: Tyler Honeycutt 9 Asts: Casper Ware 3

Amway Center, Orlando, Florida
Referees: J. T. Orr, Karl Lane, Eli Roe, Kevin Scott

=== Final standings ===
#	Team	GP	W	L	PCT
1	Oklahoma City Thunder	5	5	0	1.000
2	Houston Rockets	5	4	1	.800
3	Indiana Pacers	5	3	2	.600
4	Utah Jazz	5	2	3	.400
5	Miami Heat	5	3	2	.600
6	Detroit Pistons	5	2	3	.400
7	Boston Celtics	5	3	2	.600
8	Orlando Magic	5	2	3	.400
9	Philadelphia 76ers	5	1	4	.200
10	Brooklyn Nets	5	0	5	.000

=== Statistics leaders ===
Points

Player	Team	PPG
Reggie Jackson	Oklahoma City Thunder	19.5
Victor Oladipo	Orlando Magic	19.0
Jeremy Lamb	Oklahoma City Thunder	18.8
Kelly Olynyk	Boston Celtics	18.0
Tyshawn Taylor	Brooklyn Nets	16.8

Rebounds

Player	Team	RPG
Andre Drummond	Detroit Pistons	14.8
Miles Plumlee	Indiana Pacers	9.5
Kyle O'Quinn	Orlando Magic	8.5
André Roberson	Oklahoma City Thunder	8.0
Kelly Olynyk	Boston Celtics	7.8

Assists

Player	Team	APG
Cedric Jackson	Miami Heat	8.0
Michael Carter-Williams	Philadelphia 76ers	6.8
Phil Pressey	Boston Celtics	6.6
Dwight Buycks	Oklahoma City Thunder	6.0
Peyton Siva	Detroit Pistons	6.0

=== Honors ===
The All-Summer League Team is an honor bestowed on the best players in the summer league as voted on by participating Public Relations Directors and members of Orlando Magic official website.

All-Summer League First Team:

- Andre Drummond, Detroit Pistons
- Terrence Jones, Houston Rockets
- Jeremy Lamb, Oklahoma City Thunder (MVP)
- Victor Oladipo, Orlando Magic
- Kelly Olynyk, Boston Celtics

All-Summer League Second Team:

- Ian Clark, Miami Heat
- Solomon Hill, Indiana Pacers
- Reggie Jackson, Oklahoma City Thunder
- Miles Plumlee, Indiana Pacers
- Tyshawn Taylor, Brooklyn Nets

All-Summer League Honorable Mention:

- Dwight Buycks, Oklahoma City Thunder
- Kentavious Caldwell-Pope, Detroit Pistons
- Michael Carter-Williams, Philadelphia 76ers
- James Ennis, Miami Heat
- Maurice Harkless, Orlando Magic
- Grant Jerrett, Oklahoma City Thunder
- Orlando Johnson, Indiana Pacers
- Tony Mitchell, Detroit Pistons
- Kyle O'Quinn, Orlando Magic
- Mason Plumlee, Brooklyn Nets
- Phil Pressey, Boston Celtics
- Chris Roberts, Utah Jazz
- Peyton Siva, Detroit Pistons

== Las Vegas NBA Summer League ==
=== Teams ===
- Atlanta Hawks
- Charlotte Bobcats
- Chicago Bulls
- Cleveland Cavaliers
- Dallas Mavericks
- Denver Nuggets
- Golden State Warriors
- Los Angeles Clippers
- Los Angeles Lakers
- Memphis Grizzlies
- Miami Heat
- Milwaukee Bucks
- Minnesota Timberwolves
- NBA D-League Select
- New Orleans Pelicans
- New York Knicks
- Phoenix Suns
- Portland Trail Blazers
- Sacramento Kings
- San Antonio Spurs
- Toronto Raptors
- Washington Wizards

=== Standings/Seedings after Day 5 ===
#	Team	Win	Loss	Percent	QS	Tiebreaker Notes
1	Golden State Warriors	3	0	1.000	8.5	
2	Chicago Bulls	3	0	1.000	8	Point differential +28
3	Phoenix Suns	3	0	1.000	8	Point differential +27
4	NBA D-League Select	3	0	1.000	7	
5	Charlotte Bobcats	2	1	.667	8	Point differential +18
6	Toronto Raptors	2	1	.667	8	Point differential +8
7	Cleveland Cavaliers	2	1	.667	7.5	
8	Los Angeles Lakers	2	1	.667	7	Point differential +22
9	Milwaukee Bucks	2	1	.667	7	Point differential +10
10	San Antonio Spurs	2	1	.667	6	
11	New Orleans Pelicans	2	1	.667	5	
12	Washington Wizards	1	2	.333	6.5	Point differential +11
13	Minnesota Timberwolves	1	2	.333	6.5	Point differential +6
14	Atlanta Hawks	1	2	.333	6	
15	New York Knicks	1	2	.333	5	Point differential -5
16	Dallas Mavericks	1	2	.333	5	Point differential -10
17	Los Angeles Clippers	1	2	.333	5	Point differential -11
18	Miami Heat	1	2	.333	4	
19	Portland Trail Blazers	0	3	.000	4.5	
20	Sacramento Kings	0	3	.000	4	
21	Memphis Grizzlies	0	3	.000	3.5	
22	Denver Nuggets	0	3	.000	2	

=== Schedule ===
==== Day 1 ====
NBA.TV

July 12
4:00 pm

Boxscore

New York Knicks 72, New Orleans Pelicans 77
Scoring by quarter: 15-19, 19-18, 24-23, 14-17
Pts: Tim Hardaway Jr. 13; Rebs: Jeremy Tyler 11; Asts: Iman Shumpert 4	Pts: Austin Rivers 24; Rebs: Jon Brockman 10; Asts: Austin Rivers 6

Cox Pavilion, Paradise, Nevada
Referees: Brent Barnaky, Aaron Smith, Scott Bolnick

NBA.TV

July 12
6:00 pm

Boxscore

Atlanta Hawks 83, Los Angeles Clippers 90
Scoring by quarter: 24-22, 13-33, 21-22, 25-13
Pts: John Jenkins 24; Rebs: Lucas Nogueira 8 Asts: Dennis Schröder 7	Pts: Reggie Bullock 18; Rebs: Samardo Samuels 9 Asts: Maalik Wayns 7

Cox Pavilion, Paradise, Nevada
Referees: Tre Maddox, Nick Buchert, Mike Stephens

NBA.TV

July 12
8:00 pm

Boxscore

Cleveland Cavaliers 70, Los Angeles Lakers 62
Scoring by quarter: 10-18, 13-8, 24-22, 23-14
Pts: Jermaine Taylor 17; Rebs: Tyler Zeller 7 Asts: 2 tied 5	Pts: Marcus Landry 14; Rebs: Elias Harris 8 Asts: Josh Selby 3

Cox Pavilion, Paradise, Nevada
Referees: Kevin Fehr, Michael Pearson, Gerald Williams

NBA.TV

July 12
10:00 pm

Boxscore

Charlotte Bobcats 68, San Antonio Spurs 69
Scoring by quarter: 20-21, 12-18, 20-17, 16-13
Pts: Jeffery Taylor 24; Rebs: Bismack Biyombo 11; Asts: Jerome Dyson 3	Pts: Cory Joseph 19; Rebs: Aron Baynes 8 Asts: Cory Joseph 5

Cox Pavilion, Paradise, Nevada
Referees: Matt Boland, Justin Van Duyne, Jaston Carter

==== Day 2 ====
NBA.TV

July 13
4:00 pm

Boxscore

Golden State Warriors 56, Washington Wizards 52
Scoring by quarter: 15-15, 10-8, 12-16, 19-13
Pts: Kent Bazemore 21; Rebs: 2 tied 5 Asts: Kent Bazemore 3	Pts: Chris Singleton 13; Rebs: 2 tied 7 Asts: Marquez Haynes 6

Cox Pavilion, Paradise, Nevada
Referees: Brett Nansel, Gerald Williams, Michael Weiland

NBA.TV

July 13
6:00 pm

Boxscore

Sacramento Kings 73, Dallas Mavericks 76
Scoring by quarter: 21-16, 18-16, 17-19, 17-25
Pts: Drew Gordon 17; Rebs: Drew Gordon 10; Asts: Ray McCallum 4	Pts: Josh Akognon 22; Rebs: Bernard James 9 Asts: Gal Mekel 4

Cox Pavilion, Paradise, Nevada
Referees: Kevin Fehr, Gediminas Petraitis, Arsen Andryushkin

NBA.TV

July 13
6:30 pm

Boxscore

Minnesota Timberwolves 81, NBA D-League Select 83
Scoring by quarter: 22-11, 11-21, 22-27, 26-24
Pts: 2 tied 12; Rebs: Chris Johnson 10; Asts: Keydren Clark 3	Pts: Stefhon Hannah 23; Rebs: 2 tied 5 Asts: 2 tied 3

Thomas and Mack Center, Paradise, Nevada
Referees: Brent Barnaky, Aaron Smith, Emin Mogulkoc, Nick Buchert, Jacyn Goble, Gontas Spyridon

NBA.TV

July 13
8:00 pm

Boxscore

Chicago Bulls 81, Memphis Grizzlies 67
Scoring by quarter: 16-14, 22-15, 25-19, 18-19
Pts: Andrew Goudelock 26; Rebs: Malcolm Thomas 10; Asts: Marquis Teague 7	Pts: Tony Wroten 17; Rebs: Matt Howard 11; Asts: Tony Wroten 4

Cox Pavilion, Paradise, Nevada
Referees: Matt Boland, Mike Stephens, Mei Wang

NBA.TV

July 13
8:30 pm

Boxscore

Phoenix Suns 82, Portland Trail Blazers 69
Scoring by quarter: 16-19, 16-16, 28-17, 22-17
Pts: Markieff Morris 18; Rebs: Arinze Onuaku 11; Asts: Kendall Marshall 4	Pts: CJ McCollum 22; Rebs: Meyers Leonard 9 Asts: CJ McCollum 4

Thomas and Mack Center, Paradise, Nevada
Referees: Tre Maddox, Matthew Myers, Tomasz Trawicki

NBA.TV

July 13
10:00 pm

Boxscore

Denver Nuggets 74, Milwaukee Bucks 88
Scoring by quarter: 21-26, 15-22, 13-17, 25-23
Pts: 2 tied 11; Rebs: Jordan Hamilton 9 Asts: Darius Johnson-Odom 3	Pts: John Henson 19; Rebs: John Henson 13; Asts: Nate Wolters 3

Cox Pavilion, Paradise, Nevada
Referees: Scott Bolnick, Ben Taylor, Timothy Boswell

NBA.TV

July 13
10:30 pm

Boxscore

Miami Heat 81, Toronto Raptors 72
Scoring by quarter: 24-27, 13-17, 23-8, 21-20
Pts: 2 tied 16; Rebs: 2 tied 7 Asts: 4 tied 2	Pts: Jonas Valančiūnas 23; Rebs: 2 tied 7 Asts: 4 tied 2

Thomas and Mack Center, Paradise, Nevada
Referees: Donald Hudson, Justin Van Duyne, Olegs Latisevs

==== Day 3 ====
NBA.TV

July 14
4:00 pm

Boxscore

New York Knicks 82, Washington Wizards 69
Scoring by quarter: 24-21, 15-21, 20-15, 23-12
Pts: Terrence Jennings 16; Rebs: 2 tied 8 Asts: Chris Smith 4	Pts: Marquez Haynes 13; Rebs: Jan Veselý 10; Asts: Otto Porter 3

Cox Pavilion, Paradise, Nevada
Referees: Brent Barnaky, Matthew Myers, Jason Simank

NBA.TV

July 14
4:30 pm

Boxscore

Los Angeles Clippers 77, NBA D-League Select 83
Scoring by quarter: 18-30, 17-11, 16-16, 26-26
Pts: Reggie Bullock 18; Rebs: Samardo Samuels 6 Asts: Jerome Randle 8	Pts: Elijah Millsap 21; Rebs: Elijah Millsap 7 Asts: 2 tied 4

Thomas and Mack Center, Paradise, Nevada
Referees: Kevin Fehr, Jacyn Goble, Deldre Carr

NBA.TV

July 14
6:00 pm

Boxscore

Charlotte Bobcats 86, Dallas Mavericks 80
Scoring by quarter: 20-10, 30-18, 17-23, 19-29
Pts: Cody Zeller 21; Rebs: Cody Zeller 13; Asts: Jerome Dyson 4	Pts: Justin Dentmon 18; Rebs: Ricky Ledo 6 Asts: Gal Mekel 4

Cox Pavilion, Paradise, Nevada
Referees: Nick Buchert, Phenizee Ransom, Pat Adams

NBA.TV

July 14
6:30 pm

Boxscore

Los Angeles Lakers 81, Portland Trail Blazers 63
Scoring by quarter: 18-20, 25-10, 22-18, 16-15
Pts: Lester Hudson 15; Rebs: Robert Sacre 8 Asts: Michael Snaer 3	Pts: CJ McCollum 15; Rebs: Thomas Robinson 10; Asts: CJ McCollum 5

Thomas and Mack Center, Paradise, Nevada
Referees: Tre Maddox, Aaron Smith, Jaston Carter

NBA.TV

July 14
8:00 pm

Boxscore

Cleveland Cavaliers 69, Memphis Grizzlies 58
Scoring by quarter: 21-17, 15-15, 17-18, 16-8
Pts: Dion Waiters 23; Rebs: Carrick Felix 11; Asts: Dion Waiters 4	Pts: Jack Cooley 20; Rebs: Jack Cooley 9 Asts: 3 tied 2

Cox Pavilion, Paradise, Nevada
Referees: Don Hudson, Michael Pearson, Michael Terry

NBA.TV

July 14
8:30 pm

Boxscore

New Orleans Pelicans 61, Milwaukee Bucks 69
Scoring by quarter: 13-17, 14-10, 18-21, 16-21
Pts: Brian Roberts 20; Rebs: 2 tied 7 Asts: Tamir Jackson 3	Pts: Dominique Jones 16; Rebs: 2 tied 6 Asts: Ish Smith 4

Thomas and Mack Center, Paradise, Nevada
Referees: Matt Boland, Justin Van Duyne, Lauren Holtkamp

NBA.TV

July 14
10:00 pm

Boxscore

Atlanta Hawks 75, Miami Heat 71
Scoring by quarter: 12-17, 17-11, 23-21, 23-22
Pts: John Jenkins 19; Rebs: 4 tied 4 Asts: Dennis Schröder 8	Pts: 2 tied 11; Rebs: Jarvis Varnado 7 Asts: 2 tied 2

Cox Pavilion, Paradise, Nevada
Referees: Josh Tiven, Brandon Hiers, Mike Stephens

NBA.TV

July 14
10:30 pm

Boxscore

San Antonio Spurs 76, Toronto Raptors 82
Scoring by quarter: 19-21, 20-18, 16-20, 21-23
Pts: 2 tied 16; Rebs: Aron Baynes 9 Asts: Cory Joseph 6	Pts: Jonas Valančiūnas 19; Rebs: Jonas Valančiūnas 13; Asts: Coby Karl 7

Thomas and Mack Center, Paradise, Nevada
Referees: James Williams, Jeff Wooten, Brett Nansel

==== Day 4 ====
NBA.TV

July 15
4:00 pm

Boxscore

New York Knicks 71, Charlotte Bobcats 84
Scoring by quarter: 19-20, 22-27, 16-21, 14-16
Pts: C. J. Leslie 15; Rebs: Jerome Jordan 9 Asts: J'Covan Brown 3	Pts: Jeffery Taylor 20; Rebs: Bismack Biyombo 11; Asts: Abdul Gaddy 5

Cox Pavilion, Paradise, Nevada
Referees: SirAllen Connor, Jaston Carter, Deldre Carr

NBA.TV

July 15
6:00 pm

Boxscore

Cleveland Cavaliers 62, New Orleans Pelicans 66
Scoring by quarter: 16-24, 19-18, 14-7, 13-17
Pts: Dion Waiters 16; Rebs: Tyler Zeller 12; Asts: Matthew Dellavedova 3	Pts: Lance Thomas 14; Rebs: Lance Thomas 10; Asts: Brian Roberts 6

Cox Pavilion, Paradise, Nevada
Referees: Brett Nansel, Byron Jarrett, Michael Terry

NBA.TV

July 15
6:30 pm

Boxscore

Minnesota Timberwolves 89, Phoenix Suns 91
Scoring by quarter: 32-14, 17-17, 20-31, 20-29
Pts: Robbie Hummel 18; Rebs: 2 tied 7 Asts: Othyus Jeffers 4	Pts: Markieff Morris 22; Rebs: P. J. Tucker 9 Asts: Kendall Marshall 6

Thomas and Mack Center, Paradise, Nevada
Referees: Scott Twardoski, Brandon Hiers, William Mensah, Brenda Pantoja, Vladimir Voyard Mitchell Ervin

NBA.TV

July 15
8:00 pm

Boxscore

Los Angeles Clippers 65, Los Angeles Lakers 77
Scoring by quarter: 21-18, 19-24, 9-16, 16-19
Pts: Reggie Bullock 12; Rebs: 4 tied 4 Asts: Maalik Wayns 4	Pts: Marcus Landry 16; Rebs: Lester Hudson 9 Asts: 2 tied 4

Cox Pavilion, Paradise, Nevada
Referees: Lauren Holtkamp, Charles Watson, Pat Adams

NBA.TV

July 15
8:30 pm

Boxscore

Sacramento Kings 66, Golden State Warriors 80
Scoring by quarter: 11-12, 16-29, 17-19, 22-20
Pts: Ray McCallum 23; Rebs: Drew Gordon 6 Asts: Kyle Randall 2	Pts: Draymond Green 18; Rebs: Micheal Eric 8 Asts: Kent Bazemore 5

Thomas and Mack Center, Paradise, Nevada
Referees: Mitchell Ervin, Olandis Poole, Phenizee Ransom, Don Hudson

NBA.TV

July 15
10:00 pm

Boxscore

San Antonio Spurs 96, Atlanta Hawks 87
Scoring by quarter: 20-25, 20-14, 33-26, 23-22
Pts: 2 tied 19; Rebs: Aron Baynes 15; Asts: Nando de Colo 8	Pts: Mike Scott 27; Rebs: Lucas Nogueira 9 Asts: Dennis Schröder 3

Cox Pavilion, Paradise, Nevada
Referees: Scott Bolnick, Tyler Ford, CJ Washington

NBA.TV

July 15
10:30 pm

Boxscore

Chicago Bulls 93, Denver Nuggets 81
Scoring by quarter: 20-14, 17-21, 29-23, 27-23
Pts: Andrew Goudelock 31; Rebs: Malcolm Thomas 22; Asts: Marquis Teague 7	Pts: Evan Fournier 20; Rebs: 2 tied 7 Asts: Darius Johnson-Odom 6

Thomas and Mack Center, Paradise, Nevada
Referees: Josh Tiven, Jeff Wooten, Keith Kimble

==== Day 5 ====
NBA.TV

July 16
4:00 pm

Boxscore

Minnesota Timberwolves 79, Miami Heat 69
Scoring by quarter: 23-21, 22-18, 19-12, 15-18
Pts: Brandon Paul 13; Rebs: Robbie Hummel 7 Asts: 2 tied 3	Pts: James Nunnally 12; Rebs: Jarvis Varnado 5 Asts: D. J. Kennedy 5

Cox Pavilion, Paradise, Nevada
Referees: Brent Barnaky, Brenda Pantoja, Garrick Shannon

NBA.TV

July 16
6:00 pm

Boxscore

Sacramento Kings 70, Toronto Raptors 81
Scoring by quarter: 8-18, 18-10, 22-27, 22-26
Pts: Ben McLemore 26; Rebs: Drew Gordon 6 Asts: 3 tied 3	Pts: Jonas Valančiūnas 18; Rebs: Jonas Valančiūnas 8 Asts: 3 tied 2

Cox Pavilion, Paradise, Nevada
Referees: SirAllen Conner, Jonathan Sterling, Jeff Wooten

NBA.TV

July 16
6:30 pm

Boxscore

Golden State Warriors 84, Milwaukee Bucks 72
Scoring by quarter: 25-16, 17-15, 15-17, 27-24
Pts: Lance Goulbourne 13; Rebs: Micheal Eric 11; Asts: 2 tied 4	Pts: Dominique Jones 11; Rebs: John Henson 15; Asts: Ish Smith 3

Thomas and Mack Center, Paradise, Nevada
Referees: Eli Roe, Chris Ford, Ray Acosta, Haywoode Workman, Charles Watson, Vladimir Voyard

NBA.TV

July 16
8:00 pm

Boxscore

Chicago Bulls 80, Portland Trail Blazers 78 (OT)
Scoring by quarter: 20-15, 30-23, 11-14, 14-23, Overtime: 5-3
Pts: Marquis Teague 25; Rebs: Matthew Bryan-Amaning 9 Asts: Tony Snell 4	Pts: CJ McCollum 27; Rebs: Thomas Robinson 18; Asts: Victor Claver 4

Cox Pavilion, Paradise, Nevada
Referees: Scott Twardoski, Justin Van Duyne, Byron Jarrett

NBA.TV

July 16
8:30 pm

Boxscore

Phoenix Suns 100, Memphis Grizzlies 88
Scoring by quarter: 19-26, 31-21, 24-18, 26-23
Pts: Archie Goodwin 22; Rebs: Arinze Onuaku 12; Asts: Diante Garrett 12	Pts: Donté Greene 18; Rebs: Jack Cooley 10; Asts: Gerald Robinson 8

Thomas and Mack Center, Paradise, Nevada
Referees: Ben Taylor, Tyler Ford, Keith Kimble

NBA.TV

July 16
10:00 pm

Boxscore

Denver Nuggets 69, Washington Wizards 97
Scoring by quarter: 14-24, 19-20, 23-26, 13-27
Pts: Evan Fournier 12; Rebs: 2 tied 5 Asts: 4 tied 2	Pts: Jan Veselý 18; Rebs: Chris Singleton 10; Asts: Marquez Haynes 6

Cox Pavilion, Paradise, Nevada
Referees: Olandis Poole, Matthew Myers, Jason Goldenberg

NBA.TV

July 16
10:30 pm

Boxscore

Dallas Mavericks 75, NBA D-League Select 82
Scoring by quarter: 26-15, 11-19, 20-23, 18-25
Pts: Josh Akognon 20; Rebs: Dewayne Dedmon 7 Asts: Gal Mekel 9	Pts: Kyle Weaver 15; Rebs: Zach Andrews 10; Asts: Stefhon Hannah 3

Thomas and Mack Center, Paradise, Nevada
Referees: James Williams, CJ Washington, Mitchell Ervin

=== Championship ===
The championship will be determined by a single elimination tournament, the top 10 teams receive a bye.

==== Seeding ====
Teams are seeded first by overall record, then by a tiebreaker system.

- Quarter Scoring totals (1 point for win, .5 for tie, 0 for loss)
- Head to Head
- Point Differential
- Coin Flip

First-round losers play consolation games to determine 17th through 22nd places. These teams either keep their own seeding or inherit that of their first-round opponent, if lower. Based on this, teams are matched against their closest-seeded opponent with #17 playing #18, #19 playing #20, and #21 playing #22.

Second-round losers play consolation games to determine ninth through 16th places. These teams take the lower seed number of the two teams involved in their second-round games with the built-in assumption that lower-seeded teams that won their first-round games inherited the higher seed from the opponent they defeated. Based on this, teams are matched against their closest-seeded opponent with #9 playing #10, #11 playing #12, #13 playing #14, and #15 playing #16.

==== Bracket ====
First Round
17	Los Angeles Clippers	89
16	Dallas Mavericks	95
21	Memphis Grizzlies	90
12	Washington Wizards	83
13	Minnesota Timberwolves	92
20	Sacramento Kings	54
19	Portland Trail Blazers	70
14	Atlanta Hawks	69
11	New Orleans Pelicans	82
22	Denver Nuggets	87
15	New York Knicks	66
18	Miami Heat	113

Second Round
1	Golden State Warriors	79
16	Dallas Mavericks	76
8	Los Angeles Lakers	72
9	Milwaukee Bucks	68
5	Charlotte Bobcats	92
21	Memphis Grizzlies	84
13	Minnesota Timberwolves	75
4	NBA D-League Select	83
3	Phoenix Suns	92
19	Portland Trail Blazers	84
22	Denver Nuggets	78
6	Toronto Raptors	95
7	Cleveland Cavaliers	72
10	San Antonio Spurs	66
18	Miami Heat	68
2	Chicago Bulls	62

Quarterfinals
1	Golden State Warriors	83
8	Los Angeles Lakers	77
5	Charlotte Bobcats	85
4	NBA D-League Select	75
3	Phoenix Suns	103
6	Toronto Raptors	98
7	Cleveland Cavaliers	76
18	Miami Heat	82

Semifinals
1	Golden State Warriors	75
5	Charlotte Bobcats	67
3	Phoenix Suns	91
18	Miami Heat	89

Finals
1	Golden State Warriors	91
3	Phoenix Suns	77

==== First round ====
NBA.TV

July 17
6:00 pm

Boxscore

Denver Nuggets 87, New Orleans Pelicans 82
Scoring by quarter: 31-17, 18-21, 19-22, 19-22
Pts: Jordan Hamilton 23; Rebs: Quincy Miller 5 Asts: 2 tied 4	Pts: Darius Miller 23; Rebs: Jeff Withey 6 Asts: Darius Miller 3

Cox Pavilion, Paradise, Nevada
Referees: Haywoode Workman, Cheryl Flores, Tyler Ford, Eli Roe, Jonathan Sterling, Keith Kimble

NBA.TV

July 17
6:30 pm

Boxscore

Memphis Grizzlies 90, Washington Wizards 83
Scoring by quarter: 25-24, 23, 24-8, 18-28
Pts: Tony Wroten 23; Rebs: Jack Cooley 12; Asts: Tony Wroten 6	Pts: Chris Singleton 16; Rebs: Jan Veselý 9 Asts: Glen Rice Jr. 3

Thomas and Mack Center, Paradise, Nevada
Referees: Haywoode Workman, Tyler Ford, Cheryl Flores, Brenda Pantoja, Brandon Hiers, CJ Washington, Ben Taylor, Justin Van Duyne, Chris Ford

NBA.TV

July 17
8:00 pm

Boxscore

Sacramento Kings 54, Minnesota Timberwolves 92
Scoring by quarter: 10-21, 13-28, 17-23, 14-20
Pts: Will Clyburn 15; Rebs: Shane Gibson 9 Asts: Kyle Randall 3	Pts: Shabazz Muhammad 17; Rebs: Lorenzo Brown 6 Asts: Chris Johnson 4

Cox Pavilion, Paradise, Nevada
Referees: Kevin Scott, Scott Bolnick, Pat Adams

NBA.TV

July 17
8:30 pm

Boxscore

Portland Trail Blazers 70, Atlanta Hawks 69 (OT)
Scoring by quarter: 19-20, 12-21, 16-15, 20-11, Overtime: 3-2
Pts: CJ McCollum 19; Rebs: Thomas Robinson 17; Asts: Will Barton 4	Pts: Mike Scott 19; Rebs: Mike Muscala 12; Asts: Dennis Schröder 5

Thomas and Mack Center, Paradise, Nevada
Referees: Olandis Poole, Mitchell Ervin, SirAllen Connor

NBA.TV

July 17
10:00 pm

Boxscore

Miami Heat 113, New York Knicks 66
Scoring by quarter: 22-8, 28-16, 30-15, 33-27
Pts: Travis Leslie 23; Rebs: Jarvis Varnado 6 Asts: Myck Kabongo 6	Pts: Jeremy Tyler 18; Rebs: Jerome Jordan 9 Asts: 3 tied 2

Cox Pavilion, Paradise, Nevada
Referees: JT Orr, Lauren Holtkamp, Byron Jarrett

NBA.TV

July 17
10:30 pm

Boxscore

Los Angeles Clippers 89, Dallas Mavericks 95
Scoring by quarter: 23-16, 19-28, 20-21, 27-30
Pts: Reggie Bullock 20; Rebs: 2 tied 9 Asts: Jerome Randle 6	Pts: Josh Akognon 24; Rebs: Jackie Carmichael 9 Asts: Jae Crowder 5

Thomas and Mack Center, Paradise, Nevada
Referees: Scott Twardoski, Dedric Taylor, Don Hudson

==== Second round ====
NBA.TV

July 18
4:00 pm

Boxscore

San Antonio Spurs 66, Cleveland Cavaliers 72
Scoring by quarter: 22-18, 14-17, 13-21, 17-16
Pts: Marcus Denmon 19; Rebs: Aron Baynes 10; Asts: Marcus Denmon 4	Pts: Dion Waiters 27; Rebs: 3 tied 6 Asts: Matthew Dellavedova 4

Cox Pavilion, Paradise, Nevada
Referees: Josh Tiven, Vladimir Voyard-Tadal, Pat Adams

NBA.TV

July 18
4:30 pm

Boxscore

Milwaukee Bucks 68, Los Angeles Lakers 72
Scoring by quarter: 26-18, 7-18, 19-18, 16-18
Pts: John Henson 16; Rebs: John Henson 13; Asts: Nate Wolters 4	Pts: Marcus Landry 18; Rebs: 2 tied 8 Asts: Lester Hudson 6

Thomas and Mack Center, Paradise, Nevada
Referees: Tre Maddox, Nick Buchert, Karl Lane

NBA.TV

July 18
6:00 pm

Boxscore

Denver Nuggets 78, Toronto Raptors 95
Scoring by quarter: 22-29, 16-19, 20-26, 20-21
Pts: Jordan Hamilton 25; Rebs: Quincy Miller 7 Asts: 2 tied 4	Pts: Dwight Buycks 18; Rebs: Jonas Valančiūnas 12; Asts: Dwight Buycks 10

Cox Pavilion, Paradise, Nevada
Referees: JT Orr, Steve Anderson, Charles Watson

NBA.TV

July 18
6:30 pm

Boxscore

Memphis Grizzlies 84, Charlotte Bobcats 92
Scoring by quarter: 17-32, 17-21, 28-12, 22-27
Pts: Vander Blue 24; Rebs: Jack Cooley 10; Asts: Donté Greene 6	Pts: Jerome Dyson 21; Rebs: Cody Zeller 9 Asts: Jerome Dyson 9

Thomas and Mack Center, Paradise, Nevada
Referees: Kevin Cutler, Ben Taylor, Ray Acosta

NBA.TV

July 18
8:00 pm

Boxscore

Portland Trail Blazers 84, Phoenix Suns 92
Scoring by quarter: 24-19, 13-33, 19-22, 28-18
Pts: CJ McCollum 22; Rebs: Meyers Leonard 13; Asts: CJ McCollum 5	Pts: 2 tied 15; Rebs: Markieff Morris 10; Asts: 3 tied 3

Cox Pavilion, Paradise, Nevada
Referees: James Williams, Cheryl Flores, Scott Bolnick

NBA.TV

July 18
8:30 pm

Boxscore

Minnesota Timberwolves 75, NBA D-League Select 83
Scoring by quarter: 17-25, 21-19, 19-17, 18-22
Pts: 2 tied 11; Rebs: Chris Johnson 7 Asts: 3 tied 2	Pts: Brian Butch 18; Rebs: Brian Butch 11; Asts: Jamarr Sanders 5

Thomas and Mack Center, Paradise, Nevada
Referees: Kane Fitzgerald, Deldre Carr, Don Hudson

NBA.TV

July 18
10:00 pm

Boxscore

Miami Heat 68, Chicago Bulls 62
Scoring by quarter: 11, 21-19, 19-18, 17-14
Pts: 2 tied 13; Rebs: Damion James 8 Asts: James Ennis 2	Pts: Marquis Teague 21; Rebs: Malcolm Thomas 13; Asts: 3 tied 2

Cox Pavilion, Paradise, Nevada
Referees: Kevin Scott, Matthew Myers, Janetta Graham

NBA.TV

July 18
10:30 pm

Boxscore

Dallas Mavericks 76, Golden State Warriors 79
Scoring by quarter: 18-16, 16-19, 24-18, 18-26
Pts: Justin Dentmon 19; Rebs: Dewayne Dedmon 8 Asts: 2 tied 2	Pts: Kent Bazemore 25; Rebs: 2 tied 6 Asts: Scott Machado 3

Thomas and Mack Center, Paradise, Nevada
Referees: Marat Kogut, Dedric Taylor, Jason Goldenberg

==== Consolation round ====
NBA.TV

July 19
4:00 pm

Boxscore

Los Angeles Clippers 80, New York Knicks 91
Scoring by quarter: 17-22, 16-26, 21-17, 26
Pts: Reggie Bullock 22; Rebs: Samardo Samuels 10; Asts: Jerome Randle 8	Pts: Jeremy Tyler 20; Rebs: Terrence Jennings 9 Asts: Toure Murry 5

Cox Pavilion, Paradise, Nevada
Referees: Nick Buchert, Cheryl Flores, Tre Maddox

NBA.TV

July 19
6:00 pm

Boxscore

Sacramento Kings 93, Atlanta Hawks 87
Scoring by quarter: 20-22, 22-20, 32-24, 19-21
Pts: Ben McLemore 27; Rebs: Ben McLemore 9 Asts: Ray McCallum 11	Pts: Mike Scott 25; Rebs: Mike Scott 10; Asts: Dennis Schröder 5

Cox Pavilion, Paradise, Nevada
Referees: Jonathan Sterling, Brent Barnaky, Scott Bolnick

NBA.TV

July 19
6:30 pm

Boxscore

Washington Wizards 78, New Orleans Pelicans 77
Scoring by quarter: 23-24, 15-19, 19-10, 21-24
Pts: Sundiata Gaines 15; Rebs: Chris Singleton 7 Asts: 2 tied 3	Pts: Austin Rivers 23; Rebs: Jeff Withey 6 Asts: Austin Rivers 3

Thomas and Mack Center, Paradise, Nevada
Referees: Josh Tiven, Charles Watson, Jason Goldenberg, Matthew Myers, Olandis Poole, Kane Fitzgerald, Haywoode Workman

NBA.TV

July 19
8:00 pm

Boxscore

San Antonio Spurs 90, Milwaukee Bucks 80
Scoring by quarter: 23-24, 26-20, 19-14, 22
Pts: Hollis Thompson 21; Rebs: 2 tied 8 Asts: Marcus Denmon 5	Pts: Nate Wolters 20; Rebs: Clint Chapman 6 Asts: 2 tied 3

Cox Pavilion, Paradise, Nevada
Referees: Kevin Scott, Chris Ford, Steve Anderson

NBA.TV

July 19
8:30 pm

Boxscore

Denver Nuggets 84, Memphis Grizzlies 91
Scoring by quarter: 20-14, 15-22, 28-27, 21-28
Pts: Luke Harangody 17; Rebs: Quincy Miller 6 Asts: 5 tied 2	Pts: 2 tied 16; Rebs: Matt Howard 12; Asts: Gerald Robinson 5

Thomas and Mack Center, Paradise, Nevada
Referees: Marat Kogut, CJ Washington, Deldre Carr

NBA.TV

July 19
10:00 pm

Boxscore

Dallas Mavericks 87, Chicago Bulls 94
Scoring by quarter: 22-16, 24, 14-27, 27
Pts: Justin Dentmon 23; Rebs: Dewayne Dedmon 8 Asts: Gal Mekel 7	Pts: Andrew Goudelock 22; Rebs: Erik Murphy 13; Asts: 2 tied 3

Cox Pavilion, Paradise, Nevada
Referees: James Williams, SirAllen Connor, Janetta Graham

NBA.TV

July 19
10:30 pm

Boxscore

Portland Trail Blazers 66, Minnesota Timberwolves 72
Scoring by quarter: 16-15, 16-24, 20-12, 14-21
Pts: Terrel Harris 25; Rebs: Dallas Lauderdale 9 Asts: Dominic Waters 4	Pts: Lorenzo Brown 13; Rebs: Lorenzo Brown 8 Asts: Lorenzo Brown 4

Thomas and Mack Center, Paradise, Nevada
Referees: Karl Lane, Kevin Cutler, Thomas Sawyer, Garrick Shannon

==== Quarterfinals ====
NBA.TV

July 20
4:00 pm

Boxscore

Miami Heat 82, Cleveland Cavaliers 76
Scoring by quarter: 21-16, 19-16, 20-18, 22-26
Pts: 3 tied 13; Rebs: Jarvis Varnado 12; Asts: 3 tied 2	Pts: Justin Harper 21; Rebs: Justin Harper 5 Asts: Jermaine Taylor 4

Thomas and Mack Center, Paradise, Nevada
Referees: Haywoode Workman, JT Orr, Dedric Taylor

NBA.TV

July 20
6:00 pm

Boxscore

Toronto Raptors 98, Phoenix Suns 103
Scoring by quarter: 15-28, 33-27, 19-21, 31-27
Pts: 2 tied 28; Rebs: Quincy Acy 10; Asts: Dwight Buycks 4	Pts: Marcus Morris 23; Rebs: P. J. Tucker 7 Asts: 2 tied 3

Thomas and Mack Center, Paradise, Nevada
Referees: Kane Fitzgerald, SirAllen Conner, Kevin Cutler

NBA.TV

July 20
8:00 pm

Boxscore

Charlotte Bobcats 85, NBA D-League Select 75
Scoring by quarter: 19-12, 19, 22-17, 25-27
Pts: Abdul Gaddy 17; Rebs: Jamie Skeen 11; Asts: Jerome Dyson 5	Pts: 2 tied 12; Rebs: Darnell Jackson 9 Asts: 2 tied 3

Thomas and Mack Center, Paradise, Nevada
Referees: Eli Roe, Nick Buchert, Steve Anderson

NBA.TV

July 20
10:00 pm

Boxscore

Los Angeles Lakers 77, Golden State Warriors 83
Scoring by quarter: 16-16, 27-17, 15-23, 19-27
Pts: Lester Hudson 18; Rebs: Robert Sacre 10; Asts: Chris Douglas-Roberts 3	Pts: Kent Bazemore 26; Rebs: Draymond Green 11; Asts: Draymond Green 3

Thomas and Mack Center, Paradise, Nevada
Referees: Marat Kogut, Brent Barnaky, Olandis Poole

==== Semifinals ====
NBA.TV

July 21
6:00 pm

Boxscore

Miami Heat 89, Phoenix Suns 91
Scoring by quarter: 22-25, 15-26, 26-17, 26-23
Pts: James Ennis 25; Rebs: James Ennis 9 Asts: 2 tied 3	Pts: P. J. Tucker 19; Rebs: Markieff Morris 7 Asts: Kendall Marshall 6

Thomas and Mack Center, Paradise, Nevada
Referees: Josh Tiven, Tre Maddox, Ben Taylor, Nick Buchert

NBA.TV

July 21
8:00 pm

Boxscore

Charlotte Bobcats 67, Golden State Warriors 75
Scoring by quarter: 13-19, 21-27, 19-12, 14-17
Pts: 2 tied 13; Rebs: 2 tied 7 Asts: 7 tied 1	Pts: Cameron Jones 16; Rebs: Draymond Green 12; Asts: Ian Clark 5

Thomas and Mack Center, Paradise, Nevada
Referees: Eli Roe, Olandis Poole, SirAllen Conner

==== Finals ====
NBA.TV

July 22
9:00 pm

Boxscore

Phoenix Suns 77, Golden State Warriors 91
Scoring by quarter: 22, 23-28, 16-15, 16-26
Pts: Archie Goodwin 18; Rebs: Markieff Morris 7 Asts: Kendall Marshall 4	Pts: Ian Clark 33; Rebs: Lance Goulbourne 9 Asts: Kent Bazemore 5

Thomas and Mack Center, Paradise, Nevada
Referees: Josh Tiven, Eli Roe, Steve Anderson

=== Final standings ===
#	Team	GP	W	L	PCT	Explanation
1	Golden State Warriors	7	7	0	1.000	Won Championship Game
2	Phoenix Suns	7	6	1	.857	Lost Championship Game
3	Charlotte Bobcats	6	4	2	.667	Lost in Semifinals
4	Miami Heat	7	4	3	.571	Lost in Semifinals
5	NBA D-League Select	5	4	1	.800	Lost in Quarterfinals
6	Toronto Raptors	5	3	2	.600	Lost in Quarterfinals, QS=14
7	Cleveland Cavaliers	5	3	2	.600	Lost in Quarterfinals, QS=10.5, Cleveland beat Los Angeles Lakers 70–62 on Day 1
8	Los Angeles Lakers	5	3	2	.600	Lost in Quarterfinals, QS=10.5, Los Angeles Lakers lost to Cleveland 70–62 on Day 1
9	San Antonio Spurs	5	3	2	.600	Won 9th place Consolation Game
10	Milwaukee Bucks	5	2	3	.400	Lost 9th place Consolation Game
11	Memphis Grizzlies	6	2	4	.333	Won 11th place Consolation Game
12	Denver Nuggets	6	1	5	.167	Lost 11th place Consolation Game
13	Minnesota Timberwolves	6	3	3	.500	Won 13th place Consolation Game
14	Portland Trail Blazers	6	1	5	.167	Lost 13th place Consolation Game
15	Chicago Bulls	5	4	1	.800	Won 15th place Consolation Game
16	Dallas Mavericks	6	2	4	.333	Lost 15th place Consolation Game
17	New York Knicks	5	2	3	.400	Won 17th place Consolation Game
18	Los Angeles Clippers	5	1	4	.200	Lost 17th place Consolation Game
19	Sacramento Kings	5	1	4	.200	Won 19th place Consolation Game
20	Atlanta Hawks	5	1	4	.200	Lost 19th place Consolation Game
21	Washington Wizards	5	2	3	.400	Won 21st Place Consolation Game
22	New Orleans Pelicans	5	2	3	.400	Lost 21st Place Consolation Game

=== Individual statistical leaders ===
Points

Player	Team	PPG
Dwight Buycks	Toronto Raptors	23.0
CJ McCollum	Portland Trail Blazers	21.0
Jeffery Taylor	Charlotte Hornets	20.3
Andrew Goudelock	Chicago Bulls	19.0
Jonas Valančiūnas	Toronto Raptors	18.8

Rebounds

Player	Team	RPG
Malcolm Thomas	Chicago Bulls	15.0
John Henson	Milwaukee Bucks	13.7
Thomas Robinson	Portland Trail Blazers	12.8
Aron Baynes	San Antonio Spurs	10.5
Jonas Valančiūnas	Toronto Raptors	10.0

Assists

Player	Team	APG
Dwight Buycks	Toronto Raptors	7.0
Dennis Schröder	Atlanta Hawks	5.6
Jerome Randle	Los Angeles Clippers	5.4
Gal Mekel	Dallas Mavericks	5.0
Marquis Teague	Chicago Bulls	4.8

=== Honors ===
Being named to the All-Summer League Team is an honor bestowed upon the best players in the Las Vegas summer league as voted on by members of the media in attendance.

All-Summer League Team:

- Jonas Valančiūnas, Toronto Raptors (MVP)
- Jeffery Taylor, Charlotte Bobcats
- Kent Bazemore, Golden State Warriors
- John Henson, Milwaukee Bucks
- Cody Zeller, Charlotte Bobcats

Championship Game MVP: Ian Clark, Golden State Warriors
