= San Carlos, Distrito Nacional =

San Carlos San Carlos de Tenerife
- Location within the Dominican Republic
- Coordinates: 18°28′36″N 69°53′36″W
- Country: Dominican Republic
- Province: Distrito Nacional

Government
  - Mayor: Carolina Mejía (PRM)

Population (2008)
  - Total: 13,456
- Demonym: capitaleño/capitaleña
- Time zone: UTC−04:00
- Website: adn.gob.do (in Spanish)

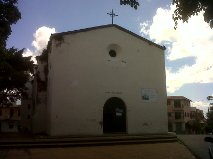
San Carlos church

San Carlos or San Carlos de Tenerife is a Sector in the city of Santo Domingo in the Distrito Nacional of the Dominican Republic. This old neighborhood is populated in particular by individuals from the lower middle class.

The village of San Carlos de Tenerife was founded in 1684 by Canary Islanders.

San Carlos is home to Club San Carlos of the Torneo Superior de Baloncesto.

== Notable residents ==
- Manuel Arturo Peña Batlle, polymath
- Nairovi Castillo, transgender activist.
