= Amelia Francasci =

Dominican novelist

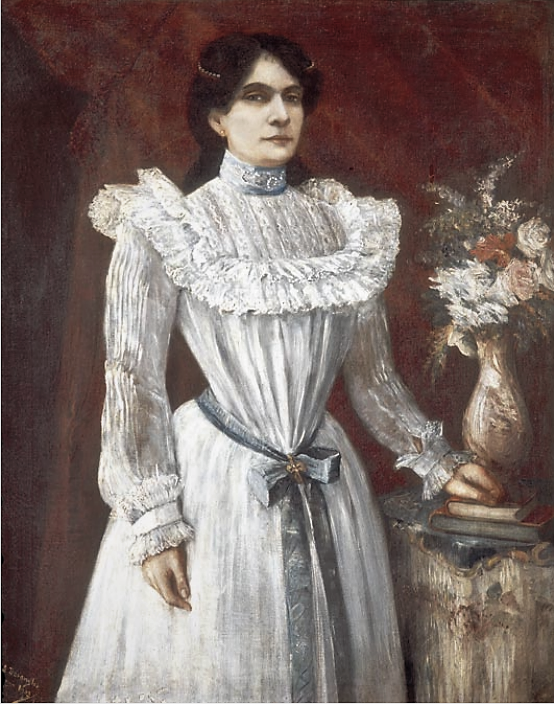
- Born: Amelia Francisca Marchena Sánchez de Leyba; October 4, 1850; Santo Domingo, Dominican Republic
- Died: February 28, 1941 (aged 90); Santo Domingo, Dominican Republic
- Occupations: Writer, journalist
- Spouse: Rafael María Leyba Amarante
- Writing career
- Pen name: Amelia Francasci
- Language: Spanish
- Genres: Novel, autobiography
- Notable works: Madre culpable Francisca Martinoff; Monseñor de Meriño íntimo
- Movement: Costumbrismo

Amelia Francisca Marchena Sánchez de Leyba, known as Amelia Francasci (October 4, 1850 – February 28, 1941) was a writer, considered the first female Dominican Republic novelist. She is known for introducing the autobiographical genre to the national literature of the Dominican Republic. Francasci was a feminist, and she faced significant criticism for writing prose at a time when women were expected to write poetry. She was also criticized for her work in erotic literature.

== Early life ==
Amelia Francisca de Marchena Sánchez was born in Santo Domingo in 1850, the daughter of Rafael de Marchena Peláez, who was a Dutch Jew of Sephardi background, and Justa Sánchez de la Parra, who was Dominican. She had four siblings, including Eugenio de Marchena and Emilia de Cohén. She chose the pen name Amelia Francasci based on an anagram of her second name.

== Career ==
Francasci studied in the Dutch Antilles, where she was educated by Catholic monks at the Welgelegen boarding school in Curaçao. She spoke Spanish, Dutch, and French fluently, at a time when few women even knew how to write.

Politically, Francasci was a liberal, a member of the Liberal Party of the Republic of the time. She belonged to the country's ruling class, and her skills, literary work, and position in public life marked her as a cultured woman. Though women at the time had little or no rights, and the constitution did not recognize them as subjects, she still was deeply politically informed.

Francasci worked for many years as a writer for the Dominican publication Listín Diario.

She published her first novel, Madre culpable, in 1892. She then produced a number of notable books in the early 1900s, including Francisca Martinoff in 1901, considered her most important novel, as well as Monseñor de Meriño íntimo, a sort of biography of Fernando Arturo de Meriño, in 1926. Her work is considered to be in the tradition of costumbrismo. Many of her books took on an innovative autobiographical and introspective tone, including Recuerdos e impresiones: historia de una novella. However, she faced criticism and rejection in the literary world for pushing the limits of what was expected of female writers at the time. Contemporary critics charged her with failing to write stories set in her native country, opting instead for distant locations such as Madrid. They also condemned the inclusion of erotic fantasies in her writing, transgressive for a female author at the time.

== Personal life ==
After remaining stubbornly single until age 36, in 1886 she married Rafael María Leyba Amarante, who was 11 years her junior. He died in 1909, and while the couple left no officially known descendants, the possible existence of heirs to Amelia Francasci has been rumored in the past. Though much of her correspondence was lost in 1930 Dominican Republic hurricane, she left behind a great many love letters addressed to the French author Pierre Loti, though it is disputed whether her epistolary relationship with the faraway writer was a cover for another romance.

After her husband's death, Francasci lived an almost completely isolated life. For decades, she rarely left her house in Santo Domingo's Ciudad Colonial neighborhood, where she remained until her death in 1941.

A street in Santo Domingo, in the Los Prados neighborhood, is named Calle Amelia Francasci in her honor.

== Selected works ==
- Madre culpable (1892)
- Francisca Martinoff (1901)
- Recuerdos e impresiones: historia de una novella (1901)
- Cierzo en primavera (1902)
- Monseñor de Meriño intimo (1926)
