= Nairovi Castillo =

Dominican transgender activist (born 1976)

Nairovi Castillo (born c. 1976) is a human rights activist from the Dominican Republic. A trans woman and former sex worker, Castillo was the co-founder of the Dominican Trans and Tranvestite Sex Workers Community, which advocates for transgender sex workers.

== Biography ==
Castillo was born and raised in San Carlos, a sector of the Dominican capital, Santo Domingo. After originally identifying as gay as a teenager, which led to her mother forcing her to leave the family home at the age of 13, Castillo later came to recognise that she was a transgender woman.

After becoming homeless, Castillo lived on the streets of Santo Domingo for several years, during which time she engaged in sex work and became dependent on substances including alcohol and drugs. During this time, she received regular harassment from officers from the Dominican Republic National Police, including being detained and, on some occasions, physically and sexually assaulted. While still a sex worker, Castillo began attending workshops run by Red de Voluntarios Amigos Sempre Amigos, which aimed to empower sex workers by informing them of their basic rights, including to health, education, and employment.

Around this time, Castillo became aware of the Movement of United Women, a feminist organisation that offer support to female sex workers. Castillo and other sex workers were inspired to establish their own organisation that offered support specifically to transgender sex workers; in 2004, they founded the Dominican Trans and Transvestite Sex Workers Community (Spanish: Comunidad de Trans, Transvesti, trabajadoras sexuales dominicanas, COTRAVETD). As of 2024, Castillo continues to serve as COTRAVETD's director. Through COTRAVETD, Castillo has attended international conferences including the Caribbean Women and Sexual Diversity Conference in Saint Croix, and the General Assembly of the Organisation of American States in Washington, D.C.

Castillo has run workshops for the Dominican police and military about working with transgender people and sex workers, attributing the authorities' discrimination and lack of interest towards stigmatised groups as directly resulting in the abuse and murder of transgender people as crimes against them went unpunished. Castillo has stated that transgender people are not born vulnerable, but that "society [and] poverty" makes them vulnerable, attributing this to "patriarchal attitudes" that were "imposed" onto Dominican people, and calling on the Dominican government to address such issues.

Castillo has also identified legal barriers preventing transgender people from accessing legal employment and education, causing many to become sex workers; these barriers have included the lack of a gender identity law that would grant transgender people official documentation that reflected their names and gender identities. She has also called on Dominican politicians to pass a law making discrimination against transgender people illegal, and to ensure authorities were upholding such laws.

In 2022, Castillo supported with the pilot of the Finding Respect and Ending Stigma against HIV (FRESH) initiative in the Dominican Republic, which aimed to reduce stigma against people living with HIV.

Castillo is recognised as national trans leader in the Dominican Republic by RedLacTrans, a regional transgender rights organisation based in the Caribbean and Latin America. In November 2024, Castillo was recognised by TRANSSA for her work in HIV prevention and education.
