= Gerardo Suero =

Dominican Republic basketball player

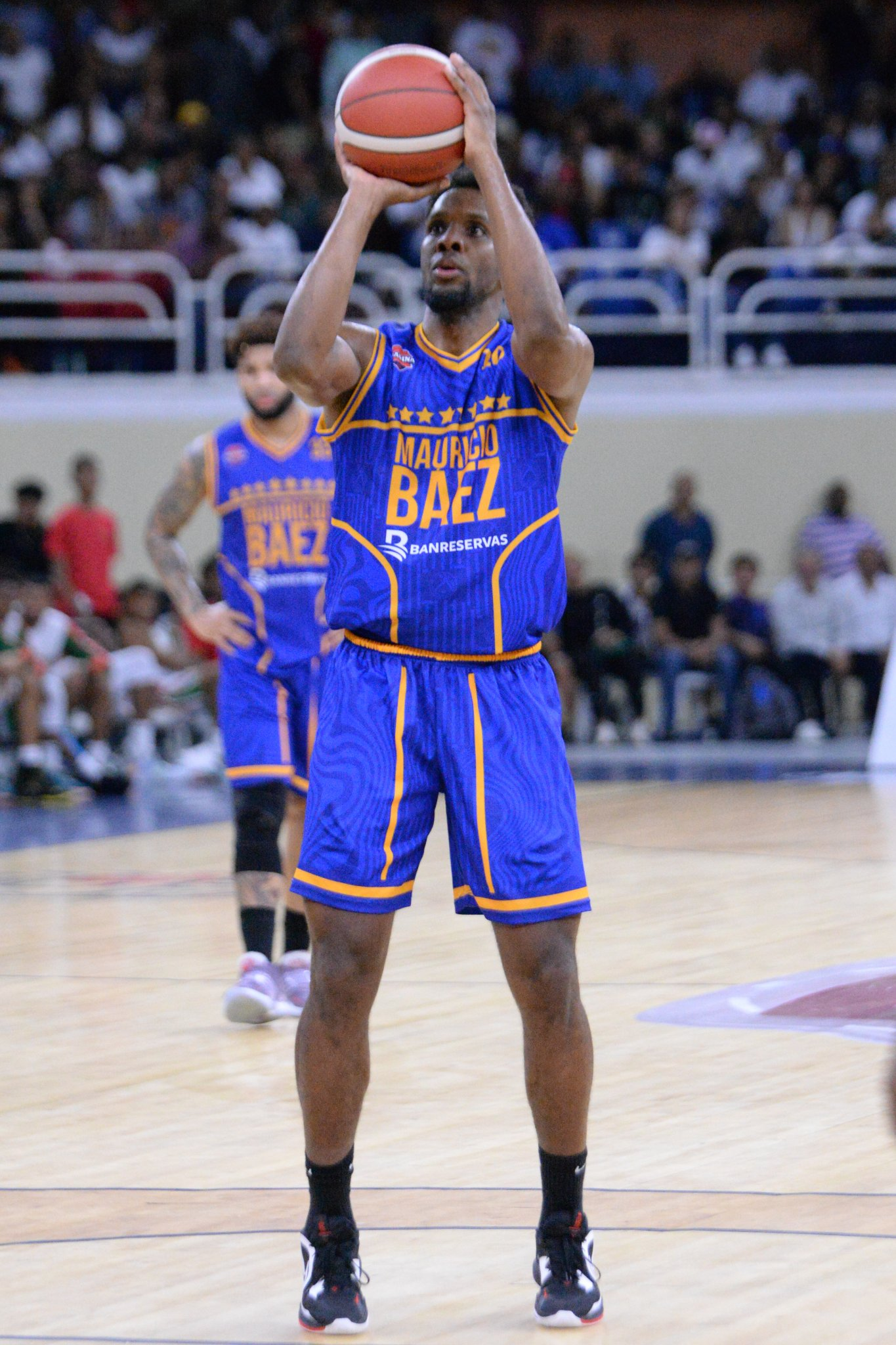

No. 20 – Soles de Santo Domingo Este
- Position: Shooting guard
- League: Torneo Superior de Baloncesto

Personal information
- Born: April 20, 1989 (age 37) Santo Domingo
- Listed height: 6 ft 4 in (1.93 m)
- Listed weight: 205 lb (93 kg)

Career information
- High school: Our Savior New American School (Centereach, New York)
- College: Career Technical Institute (2009–2010); Albany (2011–2012)
- NBA draft: 2012: undrafted
- Playing career: 2012–present

Career history
- 2012–2014: Titanes del Licey
- 2013: Guaros de Lara
- 2014: Academia de la Montaña
- 2015: Leones de Santo Domingo
- 2015–2016: Breogán
- 2016–2019: Indios de San Francisco
- 2017–2018: JA Vichy-Clermont
- 2019–2020: Cariduros de Fajardo
- 2021: Mauricio Báez club
- 2021: Grises de Humacao
- 2021–present: Soles de Santo Domingo Este

Career highlights
- LNB MVP (2014); All-LNB Team (2014); LNB Rookie of the Year (2012); First-team All-America East (2012); Torneo Superior de Baloncesto MVP (2021)

Angel Gerardo Suero (born April 20, 1989) is a Dominican basketball player. He entered the 2012 NBA draft, but was not selected. Suero is also a member of the Dominican Republic national basketball team.

== Early life ==
Suero was born on April 20, 1989, to Gerardo Suero and Zoralla Castillo. His father was a 1980 Olympic Games quarterfinalist in both the 100- and 200-meter dashes. In February 2007, Suero left his hometown of Villa Juana to live in the United States.

== High school ==
Suero attended high school at Our Savior New American School. He averaged 33.1 points and 9.7 rebounds as a senior.

== College ==
Suero attended Wabash Valley College, before transferring to Career Technical Institutes in New York City, and eventually the University of Albany.

Suero averaged 21.5 points per game in his first year at the University of Albany, along with 5.8 rebounds per game.

He claimed honors in the America East Conference as being America East Player of the Week 4 times.

== Club career ==
In the final of the Torneo Superior de Baloncesto, he scored 17 points and 11 rebounds. He was elected the Most Valuable Player of the final series by leading the 3–0 sweep of his team, the Mauricio Báez club, over San Lázaro, with a total of 70 points and an average of 23.3 per game.
