= Towson Catholic High School =

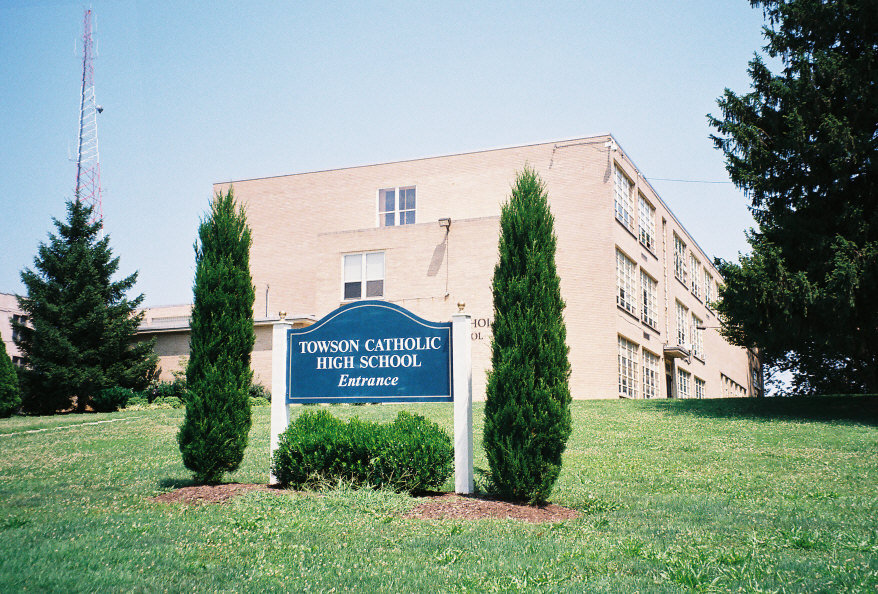

Location
- 114 Ware Avenue; Towson, (Baltimore County), Maryland 21204; United States; 39°24′11″N 76°36′16″W

Information
- Type: Private, Coeducational
- Motto: "A Small School Making a Big Difference"
- Religious affiliation: Roman Catholic
- Established: 1922
- Founder: Fr. Phillip Sheridan
- Closed: 2009
- Principal: Clare Pitz
- Pastor: Rev. Monsignor F. Dennis Tinder
- Faculty: 20
- Grades: 9–12
- Colors: Blue and Gold
- Song: The Alma Mater
- Nickname: Owls
- Rival: Our Lady of Mount Carmel
- Accreditation: Middle States Association of Colleges and Schools
- Publication: The Unicorn (creative arts magazine)
- Newspaper: The Owl
- Yearbook: The Hilltop
- Tuition: $9,500
- Admissions Director: Alice Rhodes
- Athletic Director: Jeff Palumbo
- Website: School Website

Towson Catholic High School was a private Catholic, co-educational high school in the Baltimore suburb of Towson, Maryland, whose closing was announced in July 2009. At its peak enrollment in the 1960s and 1970s, more than 400 children attended. Founded in 1922 by a Catholic priest, Phillip Sheridan, it was the oldest co-educational Catholic high school in the Roman Catholic Archdiocese of Baltimore when it closed. During its 86 years, the small school was long noted for its successful athletics program as well as personalized secondary-level education.

== History ==
Towson Catholic High School was founded in 1922 by Phillip Sheridan, priest at Immaculate Conception Church, to provide secondary-level education to Roman Catholics in the growing Baltimore suburb of Towson. The high school's original classroom building was replaced by a modern, masonry structure constructed in 1953 on the same campus as Towson's Immaculate Conception Church and its affiliated Immaculate Conception School for elementary and middle grades. The high school was renowned for its successful basketball program, producing a number of NBA players, including Gene Shue, Carmelo Anthony and Donté Greene. The girls' basketball team was ranked #1 nationwide in the U.S. three times during the early 1980s, as it fielded one of the most competitive teams in Maryland basketball history, going undefeated for 70 consecutive games from 1982 to 1985. Towson Catholic's athletic teams participated in the Baltimore Catholic League.

== Closing ==
The Archdiocese announced on July 7, 2009, that the school would not re-open for the 2009–2010 term due to declining enrollment, which dropped from 244 students in the 2008–2009 school year to only 160 anticipated for 2009–2010. The resulting budget deficit of $650,000 projected for the following year necessitated the school's closure, an Archdiocesan spokesman told the Baltimore Sun. The parish's adjacent Immaculate Conception elementary-middle school is unaffected by the high school's closing and is said to be "thriving", according to the Archdiocese. At the announcement of the venerable school's closing, alumni said its students "got a solid education and learned to appreciate classical musicals as well as a good game of basketball". They praised the small school's personalized instruction and sense of community, "where everyone was popular". The news sparked a large demonstration by placard-wielding parents, students, and alumni in front of the school the next day protesting its closing, prompting a front-page headline story, "Anger in Towson", in the Baltimore Sun. The protesters said they had no warning of the school's abrupt closing and told a reporter that greater fund-raising efforts should have been made to save the school. Baltimore Archbishop Edwin F. O'Brien said in a news release that the school's administrators had "expended great energy and countless hours to save the school from this fate."

Amidst continuing demonstrations and meetings with parents and alumni in the aftermath of the closing announcement, a lawsuit was filed by some parents on July 14, 2009, seeking to keep the school open. Alumni also began a fund-raising effort to overcome the school's financial deficit, although a Baltimore County Circuit Court judge declined on July 24 to grant an injunction that would have kept the school open.

Following the closing of Towson Catholic High School in 2009, its building was subsequently renovated and is now used for Immaculate Conception School's performing arts program and expanded middle school.

== Notable alumni ==
Past students at Towson Catholic High School include:

- Donté Greene, NBA basketball player with the Sacramento Kings
- Sydney Johnson, basketball head coach, Princeton, Fairfield University
- Jimmy Mathis, Maryland politician
- Anita Nall, 1992 Olympic swimming gold medalist
- Gene Shue, former NBA player and coach
- Ambrose T. Hartman, former Baltimore Deputy City Solicitor
- Malcolm Delaney, Guangdong Southern Tigers basketball player
- Carmelo Anthony, former NBA superstar, regarded as one of the greatest scorers in NBA history
