= A. J. Davis (basketball) =

American basketball player (born 1995)

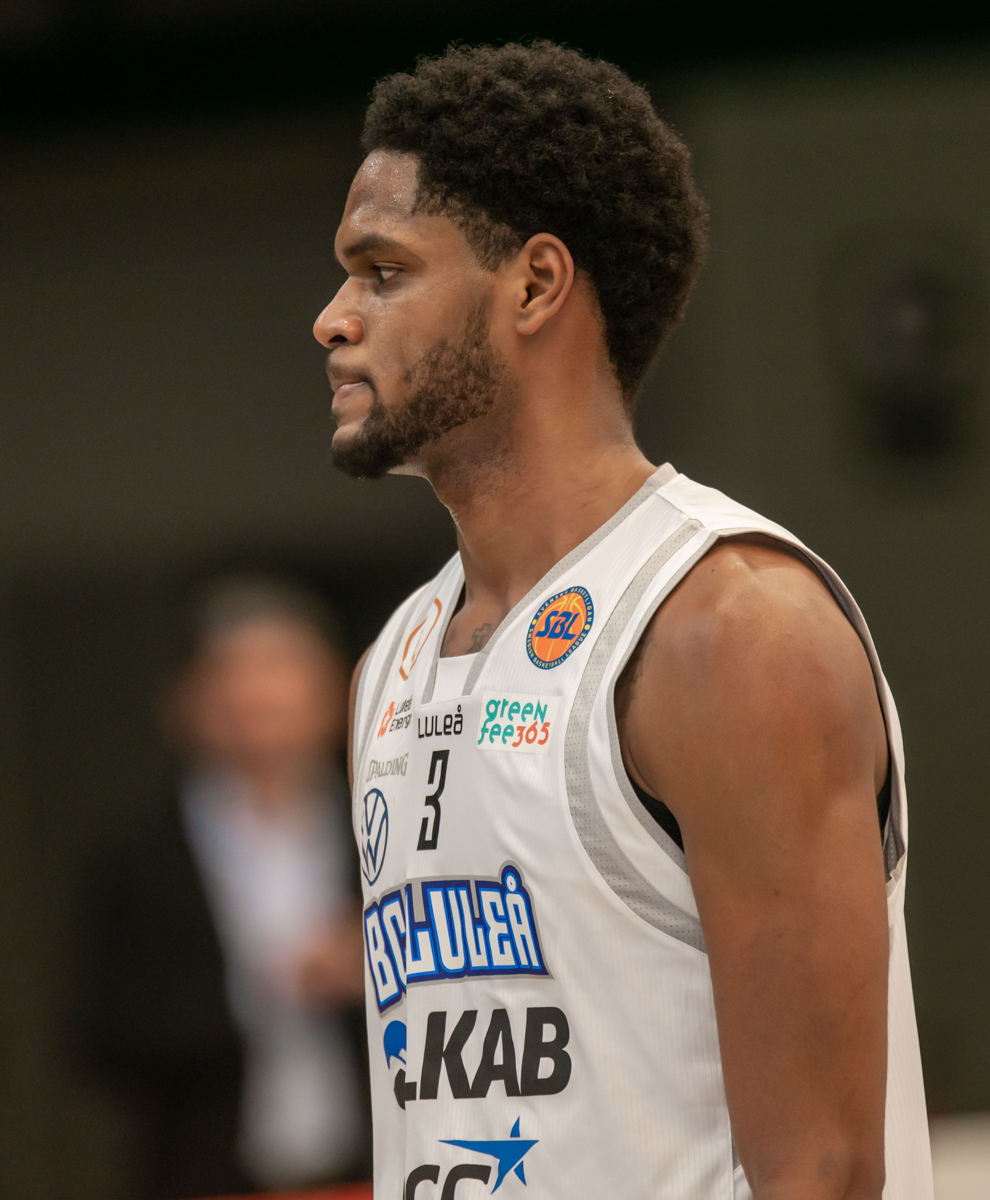

Personal information
- Born: March 15, 1995 (age 31) Indianapolis, Indiana
- Listed height: 6 ft 9 in (2.06 m)
- Listed weight: 215 lb (98 kg)

Career information
- High school: Buford (Buford, Georgia)
- College: Tennessee (2013–2014); UCF (2015–2018)
- NBA draft: 2018: undrafted
- Playing career: 2018–present
- Position: Power forward / small forward

Career history
- 2018: Prishtina
- 2019: Brisbane Bullets
- 2019: Delaware Blue Coats
- 2019: Stockton Kings
- 2020: Real Estelí
- 2020–2021: BC Luleå
- 2021: Charilaos Trikoupis
- 2021: Mauricio Báez club
- 2021–2022: Nürnberg Falcons
- 2022: Niagara River Lions
- 2022–2023: Apollon Patras
- 2023: Niagara River Lions
- 2023–2024: Leuven Bears
- 2024–2026: Niagara River Lions
- 2026: Santos del Potosí

Career highlights
- 2x CEBL champion (2024, 2025); TBS champion (2021); Kosovo Supercup winner (2018)

Antonio Lee "A. J." Davis Jr. (born March 15, 1995) is an American professional basketball player for the Niagara River Lions of the Canadian Elite Basketball League (CEBL). He played college basketball for Tennessee and UCF.

== Early life and high school ==
Davis was born in Indianapolis, Indiana while his father was playing for the Indiana Pacers and moved around often during his father's career until settling in Atlanta after his retirement. He began high school at Greater Atlanta Christian School, where he helped the Spartans win back-to-back Georgia High School Association (GHSA) state titles, before transferring to Buford High School before his junior year.

== College career ==
=== Tennessee ===
Davis began his collegiate career at Tennessee and averaged 1.3 points, 1.6 rebounds and 9.4 minutes in 25 games as a freshman. He announced that he would be transferring to the University of Central Florida after the end of his freshman season.

=== UCF ===
After sitting out his sophomore season due to NCAA transfer rules, Davis played three seasons for the Knights. As a redshirt senior, he averaged 12.2 points, 7.6 rebounds (3rd-best in the AAC) and 2.2 assists per game in 33 games (all starts) and was named honorable mention All-American Athletic Conference. Over the course of his collegiate career, Davis scored 1,030 points (33 at Tennessee, 997 at UCF) and finished 8th in UCF history with 633 rebounds and 7th with 319 made free throws. Following his redshirt senior season, Davis participated in the Portsmouth Invitational Tournament.

== Professional career ==
=== Prishtina ===
Davis signed with KB Prishtina of the Kosovo Basketball Superleague on September 5, 2018. Davis averaged 8.3 points, 5.7 rebounds and 1.9 assists in nine Superleague games, 11.8 points and 3.5 rebounds in eight FIBA Europe Cup games and 21 points and 7.0 rebounds in two Champions League games.

=== Brisbane Bullets ===
Davis signed with the Brisbane Bullets of the Australian National Basketball League (NBL) on January 4, 2019. He averaged 3.8 points and 1.8 rebounds in 12 games for the Bullets.

=== Delaware Blue Coats ===
On March 7, 2019, the Delaware Blue Coats of the NBA G League announced that they had acquired Davis off waivers. Davis appeared in two games with Delaware, scoring three points with six rebounds, while staying on their roster through the end of the 2018-19 NBA G League season. Following the season the Philadelphia 76ers named Davis to their Summer League roster.

=== Stockton Kings ===
Davis was acquired from the G League player pool by the Stockton Kings on November 25, 2019.

=== Real Estelí ===
Davis signed with Real Estelí Baloncesto of the Nicaraguan Liga Superior de Baloncesto on January 4, 2020.

=== BC Luleå ===
On September 25, 2020, Davis signed with BC Luleå of the Swedish league.

=== Charilaos Trikoupis ===
Davis spent the latter half of the 2020–2021 season with Greek club Charilaos Trikoupis.

=== Mauricio Báez club ===
Davis was part of the team that was crowned champion of the Dominican Torneo Superior de Baloncesto, after beating the team of the San Lázaro club 78–73. Davis with 26 points, six rebounds and four assists in the final.

=== Niagara River Lions ===
On April 26, 2022, Davis signed with the Niagara River Lions of the CEBL.

=== Apollon Patras ===
On August 20, 2022, Davis returned to Greece after his brief stint with Trikoupis in early 2021, signing this time around with Apollon Patras. In 22 league games, he averaged 9.3 points, 5.9 rebounds and 2 assists, playing around 33 minutes per contest.

=== Niagara River Lions (second stint) ===
On March 23, 2023, Davis agreed to return to the Niagara River Lions.

=== Leuven Bears ===
On December 12, 2023, Davis signed with Leuven Bears of the BNXT League.

=== Niagara River Lions (third stint) ===
On February 29, 2024, Davis agreed to return to the Niagara River Lions for a third stint.

== Personal life ==
Davis is the son of former NBA All-Star Antonio Davis. His twin sister, Kaela Davis, currently plays for the Dallas Wings of the WNBA.
