= Ambrose T. Hartman =

American government official

Ambrose Thomas "Andy" Hartman (February 12, 1925 – February 10, 2009), served as Deputy City Solicitor for Baltimore City from 1959 to 1961 and 1968 to 1993.

== Biography ==
Ambrose T. Hartman was born in Middle River, Maryland, the son of Ambrose J. and Catherine (née McNamara) Hartman. He graduated from Towson Catholic High School in 1943 after which he immediately enlisted in the Army. He served in the Army for 2½ years during World War II with the 29th Division's 175th Infantry which landed at Normandy on June 7, 1944. He was awarded the Bronze Star for meeting the standards for "courage and discipline between July 1944 and March 1945," and a Purple Heart after being wounded.

At the end of the war, he returned to Baltimore and attended the University of Maryland on the GI Bill. In 1951 he graduated with honors from the University of Maryland Law School He clerked under Maryland Attorney General Hall Hammond and became an assistant attorney general in 1953. In 1955, Hartman left the attorney general's office and joined the Baltimore law firm of Semmes, Bowen and Semmes. Four years later left private practice to accept a job as Deputy City Solicitor under Harrison L. Winter, who later became chief judge of the U.S. 4th Circuit Court of Appeals. He was one of the youngest men ever to be appointed to the job.

In 1961, he once again left city government when he joined the law firm of Miles & Stockbridge but returned to City Hall during the administration of Republican Mayor Theodore R. McKeldin in 1964. After becoming mayor in 1967, Thomas J. D'Alesandro III put Mr. Hartman in charge of overseeing the city's legislation before the General Assembly in Annapolis. From 1968 to 1993, Mr. Hartman continued working as the Deputy City Solicitor for Baltimore, never rising to the position of City Solicitor. When asked about his career trajectory by Mayor Kurt Schmoke, Mr. Hartman replied: "Always a bridesmaid, never a bride." During his lengthy legal career, Hartman worked for three attorneys general, five city solicitors and six mayors.

== The Cases ==
Hartman's first victory as assistant attorney general was an Anne Arundel County criminal appeal before the U.S. Supreme Court in October 1953. The Defendant maintained the evidence was a result of an illegal search and seizure, but the Court disagreed and the Defendant's conviction on a gambling misdemeanor held. The next year, Hartman, who was a part of the state's team of lawyers, gained additional fame when he argued successfully before the Court of Appeals that George Edward Grammer had received a fair trial. Grammer had been convicted of killing his wife, Dorothy May Grammer in 1952. The sensational murder trial resulted in Grammer being the penultimate person to be hanged in Maryland when he was executed at the Maryland Penitentiary on June 11, 1954.

As Deputy City Solicitor under Russell, Hartman successfully argued several cases for the city. One of the more notable cases involved the taxing of air rights. In Macht v. Department of Assessments, the Court of Appeals allowed the city to tax the value of airspace over property owned by the Machts. Concurrent with this case, Hartman also argued a competitive bidding suit in the Court of Appeals. The Appellants maintained that the contract between the City and Monsanto for the construction of a pyrolysis plant was null as City did not solicit competitive bidding. The Court sided with the City stating: "Where the thing sought to be obtained by a municipality can by its nature be furnished by one and only one source, competition simply is not possible, so that charter requirement for competitive bidding can be ignored in such a case." Hartman's victory was not a boon to the city, however, as the plant was constructed at almost double the proposed cost and failed to operate per terms of the contract.

During his career, Hartman was a key player in devising the forerunner of the "piggyback" income tax, and he successfully defended before the state's highest court the financing innovations that helped usher in the city's renaissance.

== Retirement ==
At the time of his retirement in 1993, Hartman stated: "I've gotten a lot of satisfaction in performing public service ... and shaping the direction of city government. But after all these years ... I'm leaving while I'm still in good health and can enjoy life." In 1996, Hartman and his wife of 44 years moved to Keowee, South Carolina, where he joined the Salem Lions Club and volunteered with the organization's mobile vision screening unit. He died of pulmonary fibrosis at National Health Care, a Mauldin, South Carolina, assisted-living facility at the age of 83.
