= Kyle Randall =

American basketball player

Personal information
- Born: September 10, 1991 (age 35) Youngstown, Ohio, U.S.
- Listed height: 6 ft 1 in (1.85 m)
- Listed weight: 185 lb (84 kg)

Career information
- High school: Kennedy Catholic (Hermitage, Pennsylvania)
- College: UNC Greensboro (2009–2012); Central Michigan (2012–2013)
- NBA draft: 2013: undrafted
- Playing career: 2013–2019
- Position: Point guard
- Coaching career: 2021–present

Career history

Playing
- 2013–2014: Fort Wayne Mad Ants
- 2014: Canton Charge
- 2014–2015: Rochester Razorsharks
- 2016–2017: Konstantin
- 2017–2018: Lakeland Magic
- 2018–2019: Delaware 87ers/Blue Coats

Coaching
- 2021–present: R. A. Long HS (girls)

Career highlights
- Second-team All-MAC (2013)
- Stats at Basketball Reference

Kyle Mychal Randall (born September 10, 1991) is an American basketball coach and former professional basketball player who last played for the Delaware Blue Coats of the NBA G League.

== College career ==
After playing high school basketball at Kennedy Catholic High School, in Hermitage, Pennsylvania, Randall played three seasons at the University of North Carolina at Greensboro before transferring to the Central Michigan University for his senior season. He averaged 18.3 points per game to lead the Mid-American Conference.

== Professional career ==
Randall went undrafted in the 2013 NBA draft. In the 2013–14 season he played in the NBA Development League with the Fort Wayne Mad Ants and the Canton Charge.

For the 2014–15 season Randall moved to the Rochester Razorsharks of the Premier Basketball League.

On October 25, 2016, Randall signed with Serbian club Konstantin for the rest of the 2016–17 KLS season. In 13 games he averaged 16 points per game.

On October 31, 2017, Randall was acquired by the Lakeland Magic.

On February 16, 2018, Randall was acquired by the Delaware 87ers.

== Coaching career ==
In August 2021, Randall was hired as the head girls basketball coach at R. A. Long High School.

== Personal life ==
Randall's father L. Craig scored 1,503 career points at Westminster College while his mother Karla played collegiately at Kent State. His brother Lance played basketball at Thiel College, while his brother Craig played at Memphis and UT Martin before playing professionally in the G League.
