= Torneo Superior de Baloncesto =

Dominican basketball league

- Current season, competition or edition: 21 Torneo Superior de Baloncesto
- Sport: Basketball
- Country: DOM
- Most recent champion: Mauricio Báez club
- Most titles: Club San Carlos (10 titles)

The Torneo Superior de Baloncesto (TBS) is a Dominican basketball tournament of the Distrito Nacional.

== History ==
=== 1984-2016 ===
The Mauricio Báez club won its first three crowns in a row from 1984 to 1986, with Fernando Teruel as head coach and two more in a row in 1999-2000 with Melvyn López as coach, who again won the title in 2016. He has been the most winning manager in history for the Mauricio Báez club.

=== 2019-2020 ===
Barias Club won the title in 2019.

The 2020 season was suspended halfway due to the COVID-19 pandemic in the Dominican Republic.

=== 2021 ===
For the 2021 edition, participating teams included Bameso, Barias Club, Club San Carlos, El Millón, Huellas del Siglo, Los Prados, Mauricio Báez club and San Lázaro.

The 2021 tournament went from May to June 2021.

The president of the National District Basketball Association (Abadina), José Heredia Castillo, reported that the Ministry of Public Health authorized that entity to use 20 percent of its fan capacity.

At the end, the Mauricio Báez club was crowned champion again, after beating the team of the San Lázaro club 78-73 in a match held at the Palacio de los Deportes Virgilio Travieso Soto.

For the season, Barias brought back the same core of players, in addition to L. J. Figueroa, a young player who aspires to become the NBA through the 2021 NBA draft lottery. Figueroa joined Fortuna brothers, José and Manuel Fortuna, Juan Araujo, Yeison Rivera and Paris Bass.

The Mauritians swept the final series 3-0. The Tournament was dedicated to the athlete Andrés Van Der Horts. It was held under strict security measures, complying with health protocols.

The best scorer for the winners was the US reinforcement A. J. Davis with 26 points, six rebounds and four assists, while Gerardo Suero scored 17 points and 11 rebounds for a double-double, and Juan Miguel contributed 15, with nine rebounds and four assists.

For San Lázaro, 18 points from Raphiael Putney with nine rebounds and another 18 from Raúl Frías, and Adrís De León finished with 17 points, eight rebounds and six assists.

Gerardo Suero was elected the Most Valuable Player of the final series by leading the 3-0 sweep of his team, the Mauricio Báez club, over San Lázaro, with a total of 70 points and an average of 23.3 per game.
