= Club San Carlos =

Dominican basketball team

- Leagues: Torneo Superior de Baloncesto
- Arena: Palacio de los Deportes Virgilio Travieso Soto
- Capacity: 8,337
- Location: San Carlos, Santo Domingo, Distrito Nacional, Dominican Republic
- President: Luis Acevedo
- Head coach: David Díaz
- Championships: 1978, 1979, 1980, 1981, 1982, 1987, 1988, 1989, 1997, 2003
Home

San Carlos Sports and Cultural Club is a Dominican club that conducts social, educational, cultural and recreational activities. It is most known for its men's basketball team.

The San Carlos club franchise has been the most successful team in its league, having won ten championship titles.

There are teams for both men and women.

== History ==
Club San Carlos is a member of the Torneo Superior de Baloncesto which is organized by the Asociación de Baloncesto del Distrito Nacional.

In March 2020, because of the COVID-19 pandemic in the Dominican Republic the season ended early. San Carlos was dominating the standings with a mark of five wins and one loss.

== Staff ==
As of June 2021, the club's president has been Luis Acevedo, whereas Orlando Jorge Villegas, heads the higher basketball commissions of the sports entity. The management of the team has been headed by Agustín Espinosa.

Ramírez and Congressman Jorge Villegas, head the men's and women's basketball committees, respectively.

== Sponsors ==
San Carlos Sports and Cultural Club is sponsored by several companies including: Dominicana de Seguros, BANRESERVAS, Obras Publicas, Inkaterra Green Technology, INDOCAL, Forty Malt, BHD Leon, SENASA and CAASD. Together with them EDEESTE, INAPA and Industrias Bisono.

There have also been contributions made by VV Autos, the Presidential Commission for Support to Provincial Development and the Presidency of the Republic.

== Notable players ==
- Set a club record or won an individual award as a professional player.
- Played at least one official international match for his senior national team at any time.

- (Dominican Republic) Elys Guzman
- (Dominican Republic) Ricardo Soliver
- (Canada) Shaquille Keith
- (Palestine) Kyndall Dykes
