= Ramsés Suárez =

Mexican basketball player (born 1992)

No. 11 – Indios de Ciudad Juárez
- Position: Point guard
- League: LBE

Personal information
- Born: 3 November 1992 (age 34) Atizapán de Zaragoza, State of Mexico, Mexico
- Listed height: 6 ft 0 in (1.83 m)
- Listed weight: 190 lb (86 kg)

Career information
- Playing career: 2013–present

Career history
- 2013: Mineros de Caborca
- 2014–2015: Halcones Rojos Veracruz
- 2017: Garra Cañera de Navolato
- 2017: Libertadores de Querétaro
- 2019: Dorados de Chihuahua
- 2020: Cerveceros de Meoqui
- 2020: Correbasket UAT
- 2021: Halcones de Xalapa
- 2023: Caballeros de Culiacán
- 2023: Dorados de Chihuahua
- 2024: Indomables de Juárez
- 2024: Frayles de Guasave
- 2024: Halcones Rojos Veracruz
- 2025–present: Indios de Ciudad Juárez
- 2025: Santos del Potosí

Carlos Ramsés Suárez Rodríguez (born 3 November 1992) is a Mexican professional basketball player.

Suárez made his debut in the 2013 season with the Mineros de Caborca to play in the CIBACOPA. In 2014 he made his debut in LNBP with Halcones Rojos Veracruz. In the season 2019 he played with Dorados de Chihuahua in the LBE. In 2025 he signed with Santos del Potosí.
