= 2018 CIBACOPA season =

- Season: 18
- Dates: 5 April 2018 – 19 July 2019
- Teams: 10

Regular season
- Top seed: Garra Cañera de Navolato
- Season MVP: (United States) Mychal Ammons

Finals
- Champions: Tijuana Zonkeys
- Runners-up: Halcones de Ciudad Obregón

Statistical leaders
Points	(United States) Sammy Yeager	25.0
Rebounds	(The Bahamas) Tavario Miller	10.3
Assists	(United States) Jeff Stubbs	7.2

The 2018 CIBACOPA season was the 18th season of the Circuito de Baloncesto de la Costa del Pacífico (CIBACOPA), one of the professional basketball leagues of Mexico. It started on 5 April 2018 and ended on 19 July 2019. The league title was won by the Tijuana Zonkeys, who defeated the Garra Cañera de Navolato in the championship series, 4–2. It was the Zonkeys' third CIBACOPA title, which tied the Trigueros de Ciudad Obregón for the most in league history.

== Overview ==
=== Format ===
Ten teams participate, playing in one single group. The top eight teams qualify for the playoffs, which are three rounds in a best-of-7 format.

The start of the season was postponed by a month to allow players to return from playing in other international leagues.

Locations of the 2018 CIBACOPA teams

=== Teams ===
All ten teams in the league returned from the previous season. The owner of the Mineros de Cananea, René Quiroga, attempted to revive the franchise and relocate to either Nogales or Agua Prieta as the 11th team in the league, but this did not materialize.

Team	City	State	Joined	Season No.
Águilas Doradas de Durango	Durango	Durango	2017	2
Caballeros de Culiacán	Culiacán	Sinaloa	2001	15 (Note: Caballeros de Culiacán joined in 2001 but did not field a team in 2005 and 2006, only to return in 2007 in the LNBP. They rejoined CIBACOPA in 2008.)
Frayles de Guasave	Guasave	Sinaloa	2001	18
Garra Cañera de Navolato	Navolato	Sinaloa	2012	7
Halcones de Ciudad Obregón	Ciudad Obregón	Sonora	2016	3
Náuticos de Mazatlán	Mazatlán	Sinaloa	2015	4
Ostioneros de Guaymas	Guaymas	Sonora	2009	10
Pioneros de Los Mochis	Los Mochis	Sinaloa	2001	18
Rayos de Hermosillo	Hermosillo	Sonora	2009	10
Tijuana Zonkeys	Tijuana	Baja California	2010	9

== Draft ==
The 2018 CIBACOPA draft was held on 26 and 27 February. Each team received three picks across three rounds, though five teams declined to make a selection in the third round. The Náuticos de Mazatlán declined to participate in the draft as they already had their roster filled out.

Round	Pick #	Team	Player	Position
1	1	Águilas Doradas de Durango	(Mexico) Irwin Ávalos	PF
1	2	Caballeros de Culiacán	(Mexico) Jorge Casillas	G/F
1	3	Frayles de Guasave	(United States) Sammy Yeager	G
1	4	Garra Cañera de Navolato	(Mexico) Alejandro Villanueva	SF
1	5	Tijuana Zonkeys	(Mexico) Carlos Pérez	F
1	6	Ostioneros de Guaymas	(Mexico) Jorge Salcedo	F
1	7	Pioneros de Los Mochis	(Mexico) Isaac Gutiérrez	C
1	8	Rayos de Hermosillo	(United States) (Mexico) P. J. Reyes	G/F
1	9	Halcones de Ciudad Obregón	(Mexico) Juan Ramírez	G/F
2	1	Águilas Doradas de Durango	(United States) (Mexico) Joseph Hutchingson	SF
2	2	Caballeros de Culiacán	(Mexico) José Valdez	F
2	3	Frayles de Guasave	(Mexico) Brandon Heredia	G
2	4	Garra Cañera de Navolato	(United States) Brandon Provost	G
2	5	Tijuana Zonkeys	(United States) Steve Pledger	SG
2	6	Ostioneros de Guaymas	(United States) Dominique Keller	F
2	7	Pioneros de Los Mochis	(United States) (Mexico) Sergio Lugo	PF
2	8	Rayos de Hermosillo	(Mexico) Ezra Swanson	PG
2	9	Halcones de Ciudad Obregón	(Mexico) Elvis Medina	PG
3	1	Águilas Doradas de Durango	Pass	
3	2	Caballeros de Culiacán	(United States) Al'Lonzo Coleman	PF
3	3	Frayles de Guasave	(United States) Leroy Davis	SG
3	4	Garra Cañera de Navolato	(United States) Justin Watts	G/F
3	5	Tijuana Zonkeys	Pass	
3	6	Ostioneros de Guaymas	Pass	
3	7	Pioneros de Los Mochis	Pass	
3	8	Rayos de Hermosillo	Pass	
3	9	Halcones de Ciudad Obregón	(Mexico) Omar Quintero	PG

== Regular season ==
Pos	Team	Pld	W	L	PF	PA	PD	Pts	Qualification
1	Garra Cañera de Navolato	38	24	14	3347	3245	+102	62	2018 CIBACOPA playoffs
2	Rayos de Hermosillo	38	22	16	3477	3412	+65	60	2018 CIBACOPA playoffs
3	Pioneros de Los Mochis	38	16	22	3369	3429	−60	54	2018 CIBACOPA playoffs
4	Tijuana Zonkeys	38	21	17	3309	3202	+107	59	2018 CIBACOPA playoffs
5	Caballeros de Culiacán	38	21	17	3451	3353	+98	59	2018 CIBACOPA playoffs
6	Náuticos de Mazatlán	38	16	22	3413	3489	−76	54	2018 CIBACOPA playoffs
7	Águilas Doradas de Durango	38	18	20	3447	3450	−3	56	2018 CIBACOPA playoffs
8	Halcones de Ciudad Obregón	38	17	21	3397	3423	−26	55	2018 CIBACOPA playoffs
9	Ostioneros de Guaymas	38	19	19	3357	3367	−10	57	
10	Frayles de Guasave	38	16	22	3330	3527	−197	54	

Source: CIBACOPA

== Playoffs ==
Quarter-finals
1	Garra Cañera de Navolato	1
8	Halcones de Ciudad Obregón	4
2	Rayos de Hermosillo	4
7	Águilas Doradas de Durango	1
3	Pioneros de Los Mochis	3
6	Náuticos de Mazatlán	4
4	Tijuana Zonkeys	4
5	Caballeros de Culiacán	2

Semi-finals
8	Halcones de Ciudad Obregón	4
2	Rayos de Hermosillo	2
6	Náuticos de Mazatlán	1
4	Tijuana Zonkeys	4

Finals
8	Halcones de Ciudad Obregón	2
4	Tijuana Zonkeys	4

2018 winners

3rd title

The Tijuana Zonkeys won the 2018 CIBACOPA title after defeating the Halcones de Ciudad Obregón, four games to two. The Zonkeys clinched the title with an 87–73 victory over the Halcones in front of a sold-out crowd in Tijuana in Game 6.

Two Zonkeys players, Trayvon Lathan and Luis "Chupa" Ramírez, announced their retirement following the win.

== Statistics ==
=== Individual statistic leaders ===
Category	Player	Team	Statistic
Points per game	(United States) Sammy Yeager	Frayles de Guasave	25.3
Rebounds per game	(The Bahamas) Tavario Miller	Pioneros de Los Mochis	10.3
Assists per game	(United States) Jeff Stubbs	Águilas Doradas de Durango	7.2
Steals per game	(United States) Bruce Massey	Caballeros de Culiacán	2.3
Blocks per game	(United States) Brandon Swannegan	Garra Cañera de Navolato	1.6
Fouls per game	(United States) Derek Roscoe	Pioneros de Los Mochis	3.4
Minutes per game	(United States) Sammy Yeager	Frayles de Guasave	36.8
FG%	(United States) Jevonlean Hedgeman	Águilas Doradas de Durango	64.2%
FT%	(United States) Omar Richards	Ostioneros de Guaymas	86.5%
3FG%	(United States) Tahj Tate	Ostioneros de Guaymas	44.0%

=== Individual game highs ===
Category	Player	Team	Statistic
Points	Musa Abdul-Aleem	Ostioneros de Guaymas	44
Rebounds	Israel Gutiérrez	Halcones de Ciudad Obregón	20
Rebounds	Jimmy Hall	Halcones de Ciudad Obregón	20
Assists	Jeff Ledbetter	Náuticos de Mazatlán	18
Steals	Geron Johnson	Halcones de Ciudad Obregón	7
Blocks	Tavario Miller	Pioneros de Los Mochis	9
Three pointers	Jaylen Bland	Caballeros de Culiacán	11

=== Team statistic leaders ===
Category	Team	Statistic
Points per game	Rayos de Hermosillo	90.3
Rebounds per game	Halcones de Ciudad Obregón	37.8
Assists per game	Águilas Doradas de Durango	18.7
Steals per game	Caballeros de Culiacán	8.8
Blocks per game	Ostioneros de Guaymas	3.5
Turnovers per game	Águilas Doradas de Durango	14.1
Fouls per game	Halcones de Ciudad Obregón	17.9
FG%	Tijuana Zonkeys	48.9%
FT%	Garra Cañera de Navolato	76.0%
3P%	Tijuana Zonkeys	36.7%

== All-Star Game ==
The 2018 CIBACOPA All-Star Game was played in Culiacán, Sinaloa, at the Polideportivo Juan S. Millán on 19 May 2018. Zona Sur defeated Zona Norte, 137–128. A. J. West led all scorers with 31 points, but Erick Frederick was named the All-Star Game MVP recording 30 points and four rebounds and leading Zona Sur to the victory.

Luis Ramírez won the three-point shootout, defeating the defending champion Steve Monreal, as well as Nick Murphy, José Medina, Erick Frederick, Sammy Yeager, Martín Samargo, Adrián Villalobos, and Justin Ávalos. Michael Bryson won the dunk contest.

=== Teams ===
Zona Norte

- (United States) Mychal Ammons (Tijuana Zonkeys)
- (United States) Landon Atterberry (Halcones de Ciudad Obregón)
- (United States) Quinton Chievous (Rayos de Hermosillo)
- (Mexico) Daniel Girón (Ostioneros de Guaymas)
- (Mexico) Israel Gutiérrez (Halcones de Ciudad Obregón)
- (United States) Manny Hernández (Pioneros de Los Mochis)
- (Mexico) José Medina (Pioneros de Los Mochis)
- (The Bahamas) Tavario Miller (Pioneros de Los Mochis)
- (United States) Steve Monreal (Rayos de Hermosillo)
- (United States) Nick Murphy (Pioneros de Los Mochis)
- (Mexico) Luis Ramírez (Tijuana Zonkeys)
- (Mexico) Alejandro Reyna (Halcones de Ciudad Obregón)
- (United States) A. J. West (Ostioneros de Guaymas)

- Coaches: (United States) David Kenah (Rayos de Hermosillo) and (United States) James Penny (Tijuana Zonkeys)

Zona Sur

- (Mexico) Irwin Ávalos (Águilas Doradas de Durango)
- (Mexico) Erick Frederick (Frayles de Guasave)
- (United States) Michael Lizárraga (Náuticos de Mazatlán)
- (United States) Du'Vaughn Maxwell (Caballeros de Culiacán)
- (Mexico) José Francisco Orbe (Garra Cañera de Navolato)
- (United States) Joshua Ramírez (Náuticos de Mazatlán)
- (United States) Martín Samarco (Garra Cañera de Navolato)
- (United States) Jeff Stubbs (Águilas Doradas de Durango)
- (United States) Brandon Swannegan (Garra Cañera de Navolato)
- (Nigeria) Ben Uzoh (Caballeros de Culiacán)
- (Mexico) Adrián Villalobos (Caballeros de Culiacán)
- (United States) Sammy Yeager (Frayles de Guasave)

- Coaches: (Mexico) Andrés Contreras (Garra Cañera de Navolato) and (Mexico) Carlos Key (Águilas Doradas de Durango)
