= Irving Martínez =

Mexican basketball player (born 1999)

No. 27 – Calor de Cancún
- Position: Center
- League: LNBP

Personal information
- Born: 12 November 1999 (age 27) Mazatlán, Sinaloa, Mexico
- Listed height: 6 ft 9 in (2.06 m)
- Listed weight: 230 lb (104 kg)

Career information
- Playing career: 2019–present

Career history
- 2019–2022: Venados de Mazatlán
- 2023: Pioneros de Los Mochis
- 2023: Halcones Rojos Veracruz
- 2024: Venados de Mazatlán
- 2024: Diablos Rojos del México
- 2025: Apaches de Chihuahua
- 2025: Venados de Mazatlán
- 2025: Halcones de Xalapa
- 2025–present: El Calor de Cancún
- 2026: Pioneros de Los Mochis

Irving Fernando Martínez Crespo (born 12 November 1999) is a Mexican professional basketball player for El Calor de Cancún of the Liga Nacional de Baloncesto Profesional (LNBP).

== Career ==
Martínez made his debut in the 2019 season with the Venados de Mazatlán to play in the CIBACOPA. In 2023 he made his debut in LNBP with Halcones Rojos Veracruz. In the season 2024 he played with Diablos Rojos del México (basketball). In 2025 he signed with Apaches de Chihuahua in the LBE.

== Personal life ==
His brother Miguel is also a basketball player.
