= Sebastián Reynoso =

Mexican basketball player (born 2000)

Personal information
- Born: 12 January 2000 (age 26) Caborca, Sonora, Mexico
- Listed height: 6 ft 3 in (1.91 m)
- Listed weight: 200 lb (91 kg)

Career information
- College: Westmont College (2021–2022)
- NBA draft: 2023: undrafted
- Playing career: 2023–present
- Position: Power forward

Career history
- 2023: Libertadores de Querétaro
- 2024: Pioneros de Delicias
- 2024: Rayos de Hermosillo
- 2024: Fuerza Regia de Monterrey
- 2025: Apaches de Chihuahua
- 2025: Diablos Rojos del México
- 2026: Rayos de Hermosillo

Sebastián Reynoso Jiménez (born 12 January 2000) is a Mexican professional basketball player.

== Career ==
Reynoso made his debut in the 2023 season with the Libertadores de Querétaro to play in the LNBP, he played the next season with Fuerza Regia de Monterrey. In 2024 he made his debut in CIBACOPA with Rayos de Hermosillo. In the season 2024 he played with Pioneros de Delicias in the LBE. In 2025 he signed with Apaches de Chihuahua in the LBE.
