= Josué Andriassi =

Mexican basketball player (born 1997)

No. 6 – Fuerza Regia de Monterrey
- Position: Shooting guard
- League: LNBP

Personal information
- Born: 12 October 1997 (age 29) Texcoco, State of Mexico, Mexico
- Listed height: 6 ft 1 in (1.85 m)
- Listed weight: 190 lb (86 kg)

Career information
- College: ITESM
- Playing career: 2020–present

Career history
- 2020: Astros de Jalisco
- 2021: Leñadores de Durango
- 2022: Correbasket UAT
- 2023: Plateros de Fresnillo
- 2024: Venados de Mazatlán
- 2024: Halcones Rojos Veracruz
- 2025–present: Toros Laguna
- 2025: Venados de Mazatlán
- 2025–present: Fuerza Regia de Monterrey

Josué Andriassi Quintana (born 12 October 1997) is a Mexican professional basketball player.

== Career ==
Andriassi made his debut in the 2020 season with the Astros de Jalisco to play in the LNBP. In 2024 he made his debut in CIBACOPA with Venados de Mazatlán. In the season 2024 he played with Halcones Rojos Veracruz. In 2025 he signed with Toros Laguna in the LBE.

== Personal life ==
His brothers Moisés and Luis are also basketball players.
