= Miguel Martínez (basketball) =

Mexican basketball player (born 1996)

No. 23 – Fuerza Regia de Monterrey
- Position: Center
- League: LNBP

Personal information
- Born: 17 June 1996 (age 30) Mazatlán, Sinaloa, Mexico
- Listed height: 6 ft 8 in (2.03 m)
- Listed weight: 230 lb (104 kg)

Career information
- College: Universidad Popular Autónoma del Estado de Puebla
- Playing career: 2021–present

Career history
- 2021: Libertadores de Querétaro
- 2022: Vaqueros de Agua Prieta
- 2022: Venados de Mazatlán
- 2022: Abejas de León
- 2023: Dorados de Chihuahua
- 2023: Caballeros de Culiacán
- 2024: Rayos de Hermosillo
- 2025: Dorados de Chihuahua
- 2025–present: Fuerza Regia de Monterrey
- 2026: Apaches de Chihuahua
- 2026: Caballeros de Culiacán

José Miguel Martínez Crespo (born 17 June 1996) is a Mexican professional basketball player.

== Career ==
Martínez made his debut in the 2021 season with the Libertadores de Querétaro to play in the LNBP. In 2022 he made his debut in CIBACOPA with Venados de Mazatlán. In the season 202 he played with Abejas de León. In 2025 he signed with Dorados de Chihuahua in the LBE.

== Personal life ==
His brother Irving is also a basketball player.
