= 2019 CIBACOPA season =

- Season: 19
- Dates: March 27, 2019 – July 17, 2019
- Teams: 9

Regular season
- Top seed: Rayos de Hermosillo
- Season MVP: (United States) Jeremy Hollowell

Finals
- Champions: Rayos de Hermosillo
- Runners-up: Mantarrayas de La Paz
- Finals MVP: (United States) Jeremy Hollowell

Statistical leaders
Points	(United States) Sammy Yeager	25.3
Rebounds	(United States) Timajh Parker-Rivera	11.5
Assists	(United States) Akeem Scott	5.4

The 2019 CIBACOPA season was the 19th season of the Circuito de Baloncesto de la Costa del Pacífico (CIBACOPA), one of the professional basketball leagues of Mexico. It started on March 27, 2019, and ended on July 17, 2019. The league title was won by Rayos de Hermosillo, who defeated first-year expansion team Mantarrayas de La Paz in the championship series, 4–3. It was the Rayos' third CIBACOPA title.

There was a total attendance of more than 220,000 on the season.

== Overview ==
=== Format ===
Nine teams participate, playing in one single group. The top eight teams qualify for the playoffs, which are three rounds in a best-of-7 format.

=== Changes from the previous season ===
Nine teams competed in this season.

- Mantarrayas de La Paz joined the league as an expansion team.
- Águilas Doradas de Durango and Garra Cañera de Navolato left the league.
- Frayles de Guasave relocated to Guadalajara and became the Gigantes de Jalisco.
- Náuticos de Mazatlán changed their name to Venados de Mazatlán.
Locations of the 2019 CIBACOPA teams

=== Teams ===
Team	City	State	Joined	Season No.
Caballeros de Culiacán	Culiacán	Sinaloa	2001	16
Gigantes de Jalisco	Guadalajara	Jalisco	2019	1
Halcones de Ciudad Obregón	Ciudad Obregón	Sonora	2016	4
Mantarrayas de La Paz	La Paz	Baja California Sur	2019	1
Ostioneros de Guaymas	Guaymas	Sonora	2009	11
Pioneros de Los Mochis	Los Mochis	Sinaloa	2001	19
Rayos de Hermosillo	Hermosillo	Sonora	2009	11
Tijuana Zonkeys	Tijuana	Baja California	2010	10
Venados de Mazatlán	Mazatlán	Sinaloa	2015	5

== Draft ==
The 2019 CIBACOPA draft was held in February. Each team got three picks across three rounds.

Round	Pick #	Team	Player	Position
1	1	Mantarrayas de La Paz	(Mexico) Irwin Ávalos	PF
1	2	Gigantes de Jalisco	(Mexico) Jorge Casillas	G/F
1	3	Ostioneros de Guaymas	(Mexico) Alejandro Villanueva	SF
1	4	Caballeros de Culiacán	(United States) (Mexico) Martín Samarco	G
1	5	Pioneros de Los Mochis	(Mexico) Juan Luis Ramírez	G/F
1	6	Venados de Mazatlán	(Mexico) José Valdez	F
1	7	Rayos de Hermosillo	(Mexico) Carlos Pérez	F
1	8	Halcones de Ciudad Obregón	(United States) (Mexico) P.J. Reyes	G/F
1	9	Tijuana Zonkeys	(Mexico) Jorge Salcedo	F
2	1	Mantarrayas de La Paz	(United States) Tyrone White	F
2	2	Gigantes de Jalisco	(United States) Brandon Swannegan	F
2	3	Ostioneros de Guaymas	(United States) Brandon Provost	G
2	4	Caballeros de Culiacán	(United States) Sammy Yeager	G
2	5	Pioneros de Los Mochis	(United States) (Mexico) Justin Ávalos	G
2	6	Venados de Mazatlán	(United States) (Mexico) Eder Zuñiga	SG
2	7	Rayos de Hermosillo	(United States) Omar Richards	F
2	8	Halcones de Ciudad Obregón	(United States) Hameed Ali	G
2	9	Tijuana Zonkeys	(Mexico) Brandon Heredia	G
3	1	Mantarrayas de La Paz	(United States) Eder Herrera	SG
3	2	Gigantes de Jalisco	(United States) Jevonlean Hedgeman	PF
3	3	Ostioneros de Guaymas	(Mexico) Froylan Verdugo	F
3	4	Caballeros de Culiacán	(United States) Kevin Rogers	PF
3	5	Pioneros de Los Mochis	(Mexico) Brandon Reyna	F
3	6	Venados de Mazatlán	(Mexico) Jorge Eduardo Chávez	F
3	7	Rayos de Hermosillo	(Mexico) José Orbe	SF
3	8	Halcones de Ciudad Obregón	(Mexico) Carlos Ramsés Suárez	G
3	9	Tijuana Zonkeys	(United States) (Mexico) Stephen Soriano	SF

== Regular season ==
Pos	Team	Pld	W	L	PF	PA	PD	Pts	Qualification
1	Rayos de Hermosillo	34	23	11	2925	2758	+167	57	2019 CIBACOPA playoffs
2	Halcones de Ciudad Obregón	34	21	13	2976	2987	−11	55	2019 CIBACOPA playoffs
3	Tijuana Zonkeys	34	16	18	2746	2773	−27	50	2019 CIBACOPA playoffs
4	Caballeros de Culiacán	34	15	19	2978	2977	+1	49	2019 CIBACOPA playoffs
5	Mantarrayas de La Paz	34	18	16	2973	2951	+22	52	2019 CIBACOPA playoffs
6	Gigantes de Jalisco	34	18	16	2952	2859	+93	52	2019 CIBACOPA playoffs
7	Pioneros de Los Mochis	34	15	19	2876	3024	−148	49	2019 CIBACOPA playoffs
8	Ostioneros de Guaymas	34	13	21	2785	2796	−11	47	2019 CIBACOPA playoffs
9	Venados de Mazatlán	34	14	20	2831	2903	−72	48	

Source: CIBACOPA

== Playoffs ==
Quarterfinals
1	Rayos de Hermosillo	4
8	Ostioneros de Guaymas	2
3	Tijuana Zonkeys	2
6	Gigantes de Jalisco	4
4	Caballeros de Culiacán	1
5	Mantarrayas de La Paz	4
2	Halcones de Ciudad Obregón	4
7	Pioneros de Los Mochis	2

Semifinals
1	Rayos de Hermosillo	4
6	Gigantes de Jalisco	3
5	Mantarrayas de La Paz	4
2	Halcones de Ciudad Obregón	3

Finals
1	Rayos de Hermosillo	4
5	Mantarrayas de La Paz	3

2019 winners
Rayos de Hermosillo
3rd title

== Statistics ==
=== Individual statistic leaders ===
Category	Player	Team	Statistic
Points per game	(United States) Sammy Yeager	Caballeros de Culiacán	25.3
Rebounds per game	(United States) Timajh Parker-Rivera	Halcones de Ciudad Obregón	11.5
Assists per game	(United States) Akeem Scott	Venados de Mazatlán	5.4
Steals per game	(United States) Akeem Scott	Venados de Mazatlán	2.8
Blocks per game	(United States) John Mitchell	Pioneros de Los Mochis	1.4
Fouls per game	(United States) Nick Waddell	Venados de Mazatlán	3.6
Minutes per game	(Dominican Republic) Antonio Peña	Mantarrayas de La Paz	36.4
FG%	(Mexico) Fernando Benítez	Ostioneros de Guaymas	58.1%
FT%	(Mexico) Cezar Guerrero	Rayos de Hermosillo	88.9%
3FG%	(Mexico) Axel Duarte	Halcones de Ciudad Obregón	48.7%

== All-Star Game ==
The 2019 CIBACOPA All-Star Game was played in Guadalajara, Jalisco, at the Domo del Code on May 11, 2019. The game was played between Zona Norte (teams from Baja California, Sonora, and northern Sinaloa) and Zona Sur (teams from Baja California Sur, Jalisco and southern Sinaloa). Zona Norte won the game after three quarters 106–88, but a new format was established this year to reset the score for a fourth-quarter period that included a cash bonus for the winning team. Zona Sur won this final period 29–21. Hameed Ali and Tyrone White led all scorers with 26 points each, but Jordan Williams was named All-Star Game MVP with 18 points, 5 rebounds and 3 assists.

Cezar Guerrero won the three-point shootout while Jordan Williams won the dunk contest.

=== Teams ===
Zona Norte

- (United States) Hameed Ali (Ostioneros de Guaymas)
- (United States) Mychal Ammons (Tijuana Zonkeys)
- (Mexico) Juan Baldenebro (Pioneros de Los Mochis)
- (Mexico) Ray Barreno (Ostioneros de Guaymas)
- (Mexico) José Estrada (Halcones de Ciudad Obregón)
- (United States) Anthony Glover Jr. (Pioneros de Los Mochis)
- (United States) Cezar Guerrero (Rayos de Hermosillo)
- (United States) Jeremy Hollowell (Rayos de Sonora)
- (Mexico) César Martín del Campo (Tijuana Zonkeys)
- (United States) Timajh Parker-Rivera (Halcones de Ciudad Obregón)
- (United States) Devonta Pollard (Pioneros de Los Mochis)
- (United States) Karim Rodríguez (Tijuana Zonkeys)

- Coaches: (United States) James Penny (Tijuana Zonkeys) and (Spain) Pedro Carrillo (Halcones de Ciudad Obregón)

Zona Sur

- (Mexico) Irwin Ávalos (Mantarrayas de La Paz)
- (Mexico) Barry Chinedu (Caballeros de Culiacán)
- (United States) Obinna Oleka (Gigantes de Jalisco)
- (Dominican Republic) Antonio Peña (Mantarrayas de La Paz)
- (United States) Joshua Ramírez (Venados de Mazatlán)
- (Mexico) Leonardo Sanchez (Gigantes de Jalisco)
- (United States) Akeem Scott (Venados de Mazatlán)
- (Mexico) Arim Solares (Gigantes de Jalisco)
- (United States) Nick Waddell (Venados de Mazatlán)
- (United States) Tyrone White (Mantarrayas de La Paz)
- (United States) Jordan Williams (Gigantes de Jalisco)
- (United States) Sammy Yeager (Caballeros de Culiacán)

- Coaches: (Mexico) Andrés Contreras (Caballeros de Culiacán) and (United States) Jeff Moore (Gigantes de Jalisco)
