= Nick Banyard =

American professional basketball player

No. 44 – Ángeles de la Ciudad de México
- Position: Small forward / power forward
- League: CIBACOPA

Personal information
- Born: February 16, 1994 (age 32) Flower Mound, Texas, U.S.
- Listed height: 6 ft 8 in (2.03 m)
- Listed weight: 240 lb (109 kg)

Career information
- High school: Marcus (Flower Mound, Texas)
- College: New Mexico (2012–2014); Illinois State (2015–2016); UCF (2016–2017)
- NBA draft: 2017: undrafted
- Playing career: 2017–present

Career history
- 2017: Aomori Wat's
- 2018: Rayos de Hermosillo
- 2020: Ovarense Basquetebol
- 2020–2021: Korihait
- 2021: AMIB Casablanca
- 2021: GIE Maile Matrix
- 2021–2022: Anórthosis Ammóchostou
- 2022: Rahoveci
- 2022–2023: Kocaeli BŞB Kağıtspor
- 2023: Sopron KC
- 2024: Ciclista Olímpico
- 2024: Club Atlético Platense
- 2025: Darkhan United
- 2026–present: Ángeles de la Ciudad de México

Career highlights
- MVC All-Bench Team (2016)

Nicholas Ryan Banyard (born February 16, 1994) is an American professional basketball player for Darkhan United of The League. He played college basketball for New Mexico, Illinois State, and UCF.

== High school career ==
Banyard attended Edward S. Marcus High School in Flower Mound, Texas, playing basketball alongside top recruit and future National Basketball Association (NBA) player Marcus Smart. He won two state titles and earned all-district and second-team all-state honors in his senior season.

== College career ==
Banyard played sparingly in his first two seasons with New Mexico. On November 21, 2013, in his second year, he scored a season-high 9 points versus UAB. Banyard later blamed his own laziness for his lack of production at New Mexico. After his sophomore season, he transferred to Illinois State to join a coach he could "trust." Banyard was sidelined for one season due to NCAA transfer rules. During that time, he missed one month of practice because of a heart issue, but doctors soon allowed him to continue playing. As a junior, Banyard averaged 5.2 points and 4.3 rebounds per game. On February 11, 2016, he scored a season-best 18 points in a 70–60 win over Evansville. At the end of the season, he was named to the Missouri Valley Conference All-Bench Team. For his senior campaign, Banyard transferred to UCF, where he averaged 6.2 points and 6 rebounds in 28.4 minutes per game.

== Professional career ==
On August 29, 2017, Banyard signed with Aomori Wat's of the Japanese B.League. Through 17 games, he averaged 8.3 points, 3.3 rebounds, and 1.8 assists in 19.1 minutes per game. Banyard finished the 2017–18 season with Rayos de Hermosillo of the Circuito de Baloncesto de la Costa del Pacífico (CIBACOPA) in Mexico, signing as an import player on March 27, 2018. Through 9 games, he averaged 12.9 points, 6.8 rebounds, and 1.1 assists per game. On October 8, 2018, Banyard signed with the St. John's Edge for the 2018–19 season. He was released after training camp.

During the 2020–21 season, Banyard played for Korihait of the Korisliiga and averaged 7.9 points and 6.9 rebounds per game. On April 27, 2021. he signed with AMIB Casablanca. During the summer of 2021, Banyard joined GIE Maile Matrix of the United Cup league and averaged 12.5 points and 9.0 rebounds per game. He signed with KB Rahoveci of the Kosovo Basketball Superleague at the beginning of the 2021–22 season and averaged 21.2 points, 11.7 rebounds and 1.2 assists per game. On November 2, Banyard signed with Anórthosis Ammóchostou of the Cypriot league.

== Personal life ==
Banyard is the brother of National Football League (NFL) player Joe Banyard.
