= Jorge Casillas =

Mexican basketball player (born 1990)

No. 9 – Venados de Mazatlán
- Position: Small forward
- League: CIBACOPA

Personal information
- Born: 15 August 1990 (age 36) Aguascalientes City, Aguascalientes, Mexico
- Listed height: 6 ft 3 in (1.91 m)
- Listed weight: 187 lb (85 kg)

Career information
- Playing career: 2008–present

Career history
- 2008–2013: Panteras de Aguascalientes
- 2009–2013: Mineros de Cananea
- 2013–2014: Halcones Rojos Veracruz
- 2014: Manzaneros de Cuauhtémoc
- 2014: Mineros de Caborca
- 2014–2020: Panteras de Aguascalientes
- 2015–2017: Náuticos de Mazatlán
- 2018: Caballeros de Culiacán
- 2019: Manzaneros de Cuauhtémoc
- 2019: Gigantes de Jalisco
- 2020–2024: Venados de Mazatlán
- 2021–2022: Plateros de Fresnillo
- 2022: Manzaneros de Cuauhtémoc
- 2023–2024: Panteras de Aguascalientes
- 2025: Gallos de Aguascalientes
- 2026–: Venados de Mazatlán

Jorge Alfredo Casillas González (born 15 August 1990) is a Mexican professional basketball player.

== Career ==
Casillas made his debut in the 2008 season with the Panteras de Aguascalientes to play in the LNBP. He has played with Mineros de Cananea, Náuticos de Mazatlán and Venados de Mazatlán in the CIBACOPA. He played with Manzaneros de Cuauhtémoc in the LBE.

== National team career ==
In 2015, he was a member of the preliminary list of the Mexican national team that participated in the 2015 Pan American Games.
