= Austre Tona =

Mexican basketball player (born 1996)

No. 18 – Frayles de Guasave
- Position: Shooting guard
- League: CIBACOPA

Personal information
- Born: 9 February 1996 (age 30) Hermosillo, Sonora, Mexico
- Listed height: 6 ft 3 in (1.91 m)
- Listed weight: 180 lb (82 kg)

Career information
- Playing career: 2017–present

Career history
- 2017: Rayos de Hermosillo
- 2018: Rayos de Hermosillo
- 2018: Aguacateros de Michoacán
- 2019: Cerveceros de Meoqui
- 2019: Rayos de Hermosillo
- 2019–2020: Soles de Mexicali
- 2021: Abejas de León
- 2022: Rayos de Hermosillo
- 2022: CP Peñarroya
- 2023: Rayos de Hermosillo
- 2023: Soles de Mexicali
- 2024: Rayos de Hermosillo
- 2024: Soles de Mexicali
- 2025: Rayos de Hermosillo
- 2026–: Frayles de Guasave

Austre Berto Tona Cedano (born 9 February 1996) is a Mexican professional basketball player.

== Career ==
Tona made his debut in the 2019 season with the Soles de Mexicali to play in the LNBP. In the season 2017, 2018, 2019, 2022, 2023, 2024 and 2025 he played with Rayos de Hermosillo in the CIBACOPA. In 2022 he played with CP Peñarroya.
