= Alberto Cruz (basketball) =

Mexican basketball player (born 1999)

No. 7 – Diablos Rojos del México
- Position: Small forward
- League: LNBP

Personal information
- Born: 3 September 1999 (age 27) Acapulco, Guerrero, Mexico
- Listed height: 6 ft 3 in (1.91 m)
- Listed weight: 200 lb (91 kg)

Career information
- College: UPAEP
- Playing career: 2022–present

Career history
- 2022: Libertadores de Querétaro
- 2023: Toros Laguna
- 2024: Halcones de Ciudad Obregón
- 2024–present: Diablos Rojos del México
- 2024–2025: Pioneros de Delicias
- 2026–present: Dorados de Chihuahua

José Alberto Cruz Abarca (born 3 September 1999) is a Mexican professional basketball player.

Cruz made his debut in the 2022 season with the Libertadores de Querétaro to play in the LNBP. In the season 2024 he played with Toros Laguna in the LBE were they won the championship. In 2024 he made his debut in CIBACOPA with Halcones de Ciudad Obregón. In 2024 he signed with Diablos Rojos del México were they won the season championship, in 2026 he signed with Dorados de Chihuahua.
