= Irwin Ávalos =

Mexican basketball player (born 1991)

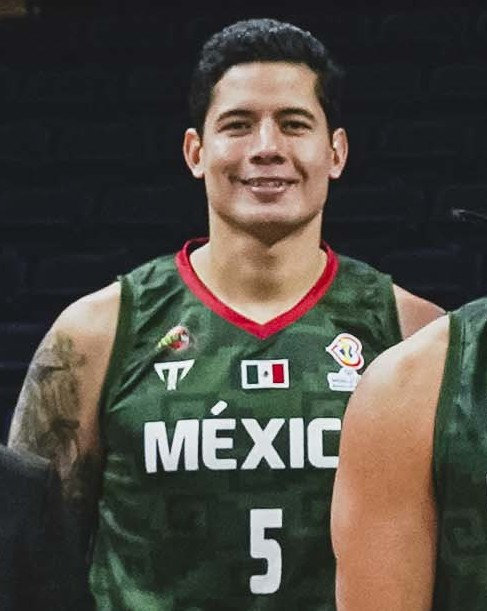
- Ávalos with the Mexico national team in 2022

No. 13 – Fuerza Regia de Monterrey
- Position: Power forward
- League: LNBP

Personal information
- Born: 13 June 1991 (age 35) Durango City, Durango, Mexico
- Listed height: 6 ft 7 in (2.01 m)
- Listed weight: 204 lb (93 kg)

Career history
- 2014–2015: Jefes de Fuerza Lagunera
- 2015: Fuerza Guinda de Nogales
- 2015–2016: Jefes de Fuerza Lagunera
- 2016: Vaqueros de Agua Prieta
- 2016–2017: Santos de San Luis
- 2017: Águilas Doradas de Durango
- 2017–2018: Santos de San Luis
- 2018: Águilas Doradas de Durango
- 2018–2019: Fuerza Regia de Monterrey
- 2019: Mantarrayas de La Paz
- 2019–2020: Libertadores de Querétaro
- 2021: Plateros de Fresnillo
- 2022: Astros de Jalisco
- 2022: Libertadores de Querétaro
- 2023: Astros de Jalisco
- 2023: Reyes de Durango
- 2023: Plateros de Fresnillo
- 2024: Halcones Rojos Veracruz
- 2025–present: Indios de Ciudad Juárez
- 2025: Caballeros de Culiacán
- 2025: Gambusinos de Fresnillo
- 2025: Santos del Potosí
- 2026–present: Fuerza Regia de Monterrey

Career highlights
- 2× CIBACOPA All-Star (2018, 2019); LNBP All-Star (2017)
Medals
Men's basketball
Representing Mexico
FIBA AmeriCup
| Bronze medal – third place | 2017 Argentina |

Irwin Ávalos Bonilla (born 13 June 1991) is a Mexican basketball player for Plateros de Fresnillo and the Mexico national team.

== Professional career ==
Ávalos returned to his hometown and joined the Águilas Doradas de Durango ahead of the 2017 CIBACOPA season.

Ávalos signed with the Reyes de Durango of the Circuito de Baloncesto del Pacífico (CIBAPAC) ahead of the 2023 CIBAPAC season.

Ávalos signed with the Plateros de Fresnillo in August 2023.

== National team career ==
He participated at the 2017 FIBA AmeriCup.
