= Terrence Drisdom =

American professional basketball player

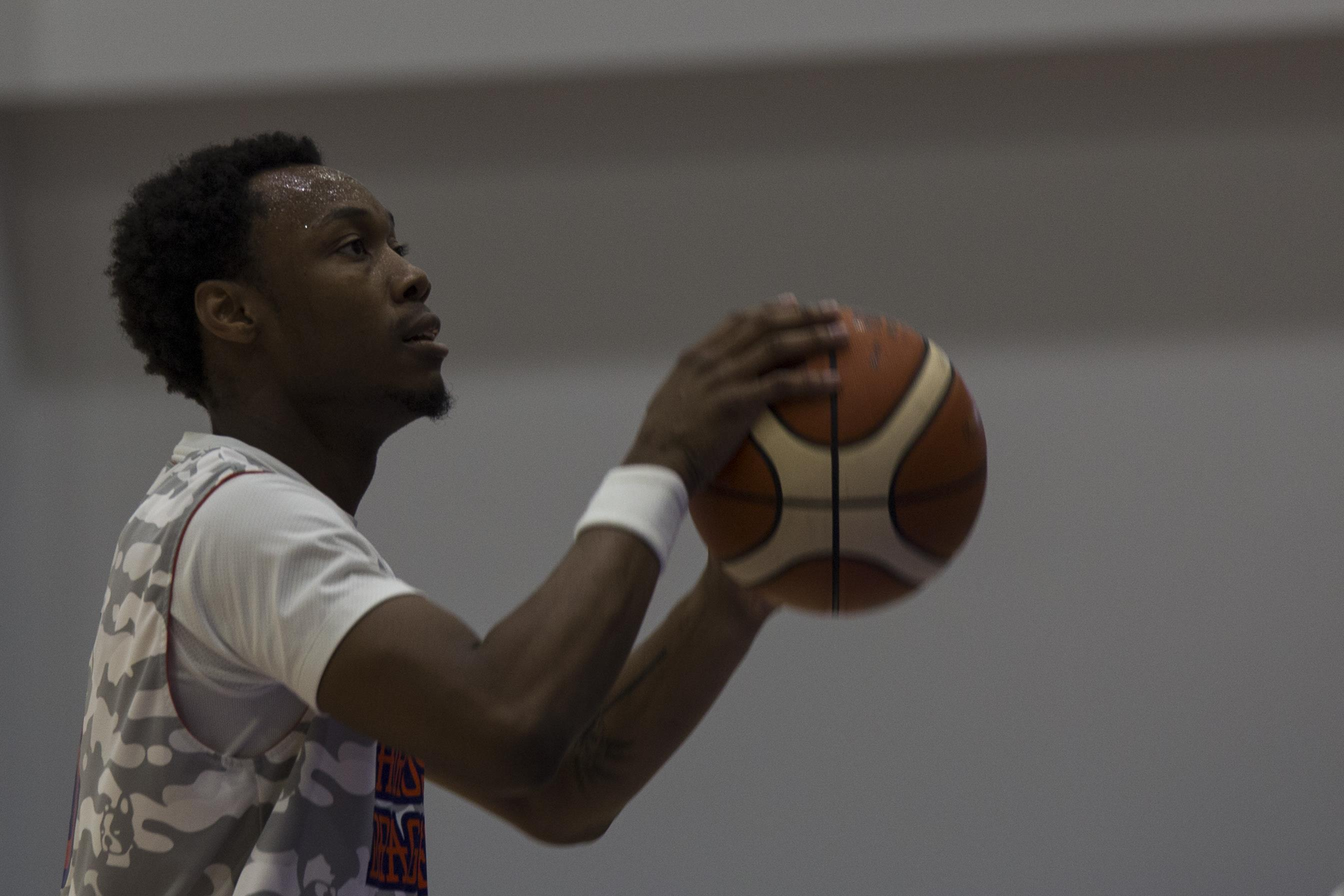

Rayos de Hermosillo
- Position: Shooting guard
- League: CIBACOPA

Personal information
- Born: July 30, 1992 (age 34) Los Angeles County, California
- Listed height: 6 ft 5 in (1.96 m)
- Listed weight: 195 lb (88 kg)

Career information
- High school: Eleanor Roosevelt (Corona, California)
- College: Cal Poly Pomona (2010–2015)
- NBA draft: 2015: undrafted
- Playing career: 2015–2020

Career history
- 2015–2017: Santa Cruz Warriors
- 2017–2018: Hiroshima Dragonflies
- 2018: Memphis Hustle
- 2019: Delaware Blue Coats
- 2019: Rayos de Hermosillo
- 2019: Huracanes de Tampico
- 2020: Rayos de Hermosillo
- 2022–present: Rayos de Hermosillo

Career highlights
- CIBACOPA champion (2019, 2024); 2× CCAA Player of the Year (2015); 2× First-team All-CCAA (2013, 2015)

Terrence Lee Drisdom (born July 30, 1992) is an American professional basketball player for the Rayos de Hermosillo of the CIBACOPA.

Drisdom played college basketball at Cal Poly Pomona. He was named the CCAA Player of the Year as a senior after averaging 15.8 points, 6.0 rebounds, 2.6 assists and 2.4 steals per game.

For the 2018–19 season, Drisdom signed with the Memphis Hustle of the NBA G League. He was waived by the Hustle on December 7, 2018, after appearing in five games.

In the summers of 2016 and 2017, Drisdom played in The Basketball Tournament on ESPN for Team Utah (Utah Alumni). He competed for the $2 million prize, and for Team Utah in 2017, he averaged 21 points per game and shot 81 percent behind the free-throw line. Drisdom helped take Team Utah to the second round of the tournament, where they lost to team Few Good Men (Gonzaga Alumni) by a score of 85–83.
