= Jaleel Roberts =

American basketball player (born 1992)

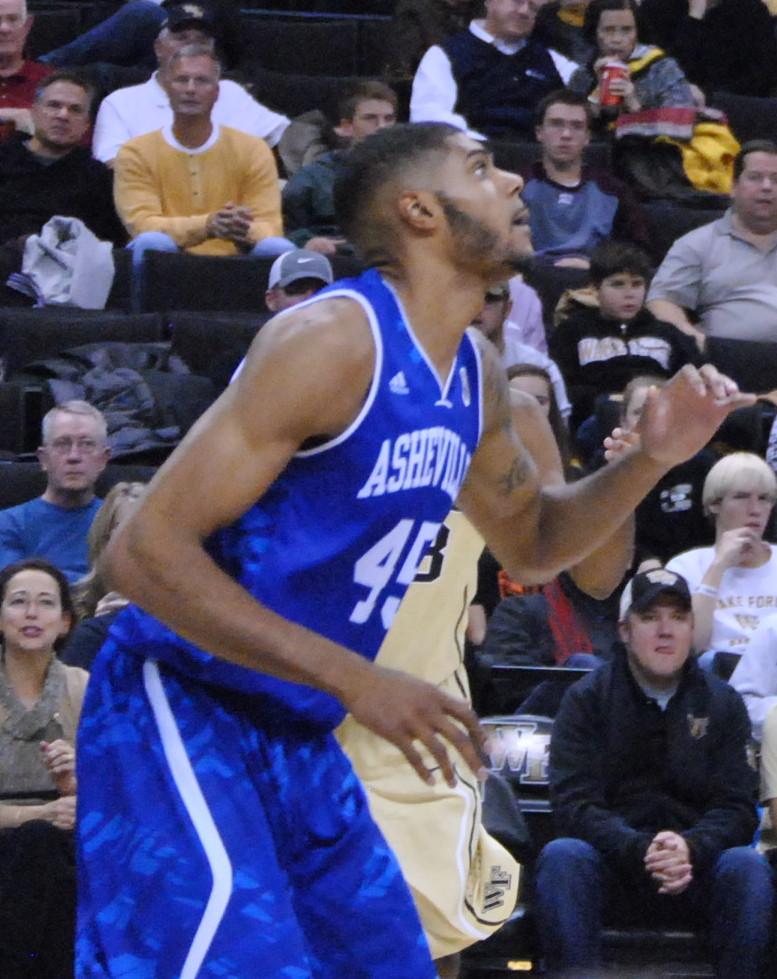

Personal information
- Born: October 14, 1992 (age 34) Evans, Georgia
- Listed height: 7 ft 1 in (2.16 m)
- Listed weight: 250 lb (113 kg)

Career information
- High school: Greensboro Day School (Greensboro, North Carolina)
- College: UNC Asheville (2011–2015)
- NBA draft: 2015: undrafted
- Playing career: 2016–2019
- Position: Center

Career history
- 2016: Brisbane Spartans
- 2016: Santa Cruz Warriors
- 2016–2017: Salt Lake City Stars
- 2017–2018: Politehnica Iași
- 2018: San Carlos
- 2018: Pelita Jaya
- 2019: Soles de Mexicali
- 2019: Mantarrayas de La Paz
- Stats at Basketball Reference

Jaleel Roberts (born October 14, 1992) is an American former professional basketball player who last played for Mantarrayas de La Paz of the Circuito de Baloncesto de la Costa del Pacífico (CIBACOPA). He also played college basketball for UNC Asheville.

== High school career ==
Roberts attended Evans High School in Evans, GA as a freshman playing for Kevin Kenny. Jaleel loved to STDA and averaged 34 points, eight rebounds and four blocks per game for the Knights.

Roberts attended Greensboro Day School in Greensboro, North Carolina where he played for head coach Freddie Johnson. As a senior in 2010–11, he averaged eight points, eight rebounds and four blocks per game for a Bengals team that finished with a 23–5 overall record and advanced to the state playoffs.

== College career ==
Roberts played four years of college basketball for the UNC Asheville Bulldogs, appearing in 90 games with five starts, and averaging 4.1 points, 3.2 rebounds and 1.4 blocks in 12.3 minutes per game. Roberts made a name for himself by being a defensive terror in the paint for the Bulldogs, as he averaged 2.6 blocks per game as a senior in 2014–15. On February 18, 2015, in a loss to Winthrop, he set a school and conference record with a perfect shooting performance from the field, making all 12 of his field goal attempts for a career-high 25 points.

== Professional career ==
After going undrafted in the 2015 NBA draft, Roberts joined the Washington Wizards for the 2015 NBA Summer League, where he recorded five rebounds in three games. He later signed with the Wizards for training camp on September 25, but was waived by the team on October 24 after appearing in three preseason games.

On March 7, 2016, Roberts signed with the Brisbane Spartans for the 2016 SEABL season. After going scoreless in the team's season opener against the Geelong Supercats on April 1, he scored 12 points the following day in a 91–65 loss to the Kilsyth Cobras. He left the team in June 2016 in order to re-join the Washington Wizards for the 2016 NBA Summer League. In 13 games for the Spartans, Roberts averaged 8.5 points, 6.0 rebounds and 1.0 blocks per game.

On September 23, 2016, Roberts signed with the Milwaukee Bucks, but was waived on October 22 after appearing in five preseason games. On October 30, he was selected by the Santa Cruz Warriors with the second overall pick in the 2016 NBA Development League Draft and in six games, he averaged 2.8 points and 1.2 rebounds in 7.3 minutes. On December 14, Roberts was traded, along the player rights for Mac Koshwal, to the Salt Lake City Stars in exchange for a second-round draft pick. Two days later, he made his debut for the Stars in an 87–75 loss to the Rio Grande Valley Vipers, recording two rebounds in four minutes off the bench.

In March 2018, Roberts signed with San Carlos of the Dominican Torneo de Baloncesto Superior (TBS), making his debut on March 27 in an 81–96 loss to Mauricio Baez. On May 8, he signed with Pelita Jaya Energi Mega Persada of the Indonesian League.

Galloway arrived at the Mexican club Soles de Mexicali in January 2019 and played three games with them in the 2019 FIBA Americas League group stage. In February, it was announced he had signed with another Mexican club, Mantarrayas de La Paz, an expansion team going into their debut season in the Circuito de Baloncesto de la Costa del Pacífico (CIBACOPA).
