= Arena Sonora =

Arena in Hermosillo, Sonora, Mexico

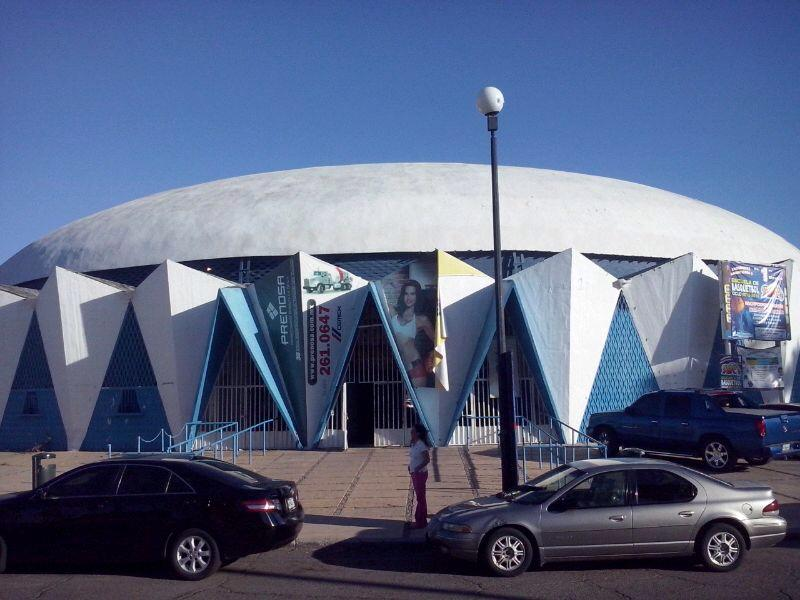
- Interactive map of Arena Sonora
- Former names: Gimnasio del Estado (1969–2019)
- Location: Hermosillo, Sonora
- Coordinates: 29°05′42.7″N 110°57′9.4″W
- Owner: Government of Sonora
- Capacity: 3,500

Construction
- Opened: 31 December 1969

Tenants
- Basketball Soles de Hermosillo (CIMEBA) (1990s); Soles de Hermosillo (CIBACOPA) (2003–05); Seris de Hermosillo (ABA) (2004–05); Rayos de Hermosillo (CIBACOPA) (2009–present)

The Arena Sonora is an indoor arena located in Hermosillo, Sonora, Mexico. Inaugurated in 1969, it seats 3,500 spectators. The arena is the home venue of the Rayos de Hermosillo of the Circuito de Baloncesto de la Costa del Pacífico (CIBACOPA).

The Arena Sonora has previously served as the home of the Soles de Hermosillo, which played in the Circuito Mexicano de Básquetbol (CIMEBA) and the CIBACOPA, and the Seris de Hermosillo, which played in the modern American Basketball Association (ABA) in the 2004–05 ABA season.

== History ==
The building was inaugurated on 31 December 1969 as the Gimnasio del Estado. It has since hosted sports such as volleyball, boxing, karate, taekwondo, lucha libre, and cheerleading, as well as the Olimpiada Nacional (National Olympics).

On 29 December 1979, local boxer Manuel "Topo Gigio" Vázquez defeated the reigning WBC bantamweight champion, Lupe Pintor, in a non-title fight at the Gimnasio del Estado. On 23 February 2013, David Sánchez defeated Marlon Tapales at the arena for the WBC interim Silver super flyweight title. Sánchez returned to the arena on 18 January 2014, beating Filipino challenger Marco Demecillo via knockout. Future world champion Francisco Rodríguez Jr. was on the same card. Empalme native Hernán Márquez headlined two cards at the Gimnasio del Estado. On 19 April 2013, he stopped Edgar "Power" Jiménez in the third round of their bout. Márquez returned four years later and earned a victory against Eduardo Hernández via technical decision. Another Emplame native, José Luis Castillo fought at the arena on 21 March 2014, defeating Félix Bojórquez at the age of 40.

The arena helped to host the Mini Basketball Festival of the Americas and Congress, which was held in Hermosillo from 31 January to 3 February 2019. On the first day of the event, the venue was reinaugurated as the Arena Sonora by the Governor of Sonora, Claudia Pavlovich, and it was announced that MXN$65.5 million had been invested into remodeling the property. There was general maintenance work done to the court and to the hydraulic and electric systems, and amenities such as the dressing rooms and bathrooms were upgraded. Other work done includes the installation of video boards and air conditioning units, as well as the construction of a food area, an esplanade, and a parking lot. The event was also attended by FIBA president Horacio Muratore and legendary Mexican player Horacio Llamas.

During the COVID-19 pandemic, the arena was used as a COVID-19 testing site from July 2020 to April 2022.

The arena hosted the 2022 Women's Pan-American Volleyball Cup, a ten-team volleyball tournament held from 19 to 29 August. The Mexico national team finished in fourth place after losing the bronze-medal game to the United States.

=== Basketball ===
The arena has served as the home venue for several basketball teams throughout its history. In the early 1990s, it hosted the Soles de Hermosillo of the Circuito Mexicano de Básquetbol (CIMEBA). The Soles later resurfaced as members of the Circuito de Baloncesto de la Costa del Pacífico (CIBACOPA), playing in the arena from 2003 to 2005. Additionally, the arena served as the home of the Seris de Hermosillo, which played in the modern American Basketball Association (ABA) in the 2004–05 ABA season. However, the team suspended its operations in January 2005 due to financial issues. The arena also hosts a youth basketball tournament every winter, celebrating its 35th edition in 2022 with a record 120 teams.

In 2009, a new CIBACOPA team, the Rayos de Hermosillo, began playing at the Gimnasio del Estado.

For three consecutive seasons, the arena hosted the deciding game of the CIBACOPA Finals. After getting swept by the Mineros de Cananea in the 2011 Finals, Hermosillo secured their first league title in franchise history by beating the Ostioneros de Guaymas at home in game 7 of the 2012 Finals. The Rayos went on to repeat as CIBACOPA champions the following year after beating the Garra Cañera de Navolato in seven games.

The Rayos de Hermosillo played their first game in the remodeled Arena Sonora on 5 April 2019, defeating the Venados de Mazatlán by a score of 73–64.
