= Moisés Andriassi =

Mexican basketball player (born 2000)

No. 7 – Astros de Jalisco
- Position: Shooting guard
- League: LNBP

Personal information
- Born: 1 March 2000 (age 26) Texcoco, State of Mexico, Mexico
- Listed height: 6 ft 1 in (1.85 m)
- Listed weight: 192 lb (87 kg)

Career information
- High school: Prepa UPAEP (Puebla City, Puebla, Mexico)
- College: UDLAP (2018–2019)
- NBA draft: 2022: undrafted
- Playing career: 2019–present

Career history
- 2019–2020: Capitanes de Ciudad de México
- 2020: Astros de Jalisco
- 2021: Covirán Granada
- 2021–2022: Mexico City Capitanes
- 2022: Astros de Jalisco
- 2022: Soles de Mexicali
- 2022–2023: Mexico City Capitanes
- 2023–2024: Astros de Jalisco
- 2025: Toros Laguna
- 2025–present: Astros de Jalisco

Career highlights
- LNBP All-Star (2022); LNBP Revelation of the Year (2022); LNBP Rookie of the Year (2020); LNBP Three-Point Contest champion (2020); 3× CIBACOPA champion (2022, 2023, 2025)

Moisés Emilio Andriassi Quintana (born 29 February 2000) is a Mexican professional basketball player for the Astros de Jalisco of the Liga Nacional de Baloncesto Profesional (LNBP), and the Mexican national team. He played college basketball for the Aztecas UDLAP and is considered one of the most promising young talents of Mexican basketball.

== Early years ==
Both of Andriassi's older brothers, Josué and Luis, played college basketball at ITESM Hidalgo and Universidad Panamericana, respectively. They are both former collegiate Mexican national champions.

The youngest Andriassi participated in the 2017 Basketball Without Borders Americas Camp in The Bahamas. He went on to played college basketball for the Aztecas UDLAP in Liga ABE, where he was considered one of the top players in the league. In his only season with the Aztecas, he led them to the 2019 Liga ABE Ochos Grandes national championship tournament, which both of his brothers also participated in that year. He recorded 21 points and seven rebounds in the 86–67 win over Borregos Salvajes in the quarterfinals, but his team was eliminated in the next round by his brother's school, ITESM Hidalgo. He scored 21 points in the third-place game against ITESM Guadalajara, which they won 93–89 in overtime.

== Professional career ==
Andriassi turned pro in 2019, at the age of 19. In July, he signed a deal with the Capitanes de Ciudad de México which at the time was a member of the Liga Nacional de Baloncesto Profesional (LNBP), the top professional league in Mexico. He made his debut with the team on September 19, during their loss to Uruguay Elite Team at the 2019 NBA G League International Challenge. A week later, he made his league debut during the first game of the 2019–20 season: a 96–80 home victory over Astros de Jalisco. He made his first career start on November 2 versus Libertadores de Querétaro. The next night, also against Querétaro, he scored 14 points and hit four three-pointers. In November, he won the LNBP Three-Point Contest during the league's All-Star Weekend, defeating veterans like Ángel Daniel Vassallo, Aaron Harper and that season's MVP Luke Martínez for the title. This cemented him as one of the best young players in Mexican basketball, despite playing limited minutes for his club. In about 14 minutes a game, he was averaging 6.4 points, 1.3 rebounds and 1.2 assists. On December 7, Andriassi set a new season-high for both points and made three-pointers by going 6-for-7 from behind the arc for 18 points against Aguacateros de Michoacán at home. Two weeks later, he recorded 26 points, eight assists, four rebounds, and again sank six three-pointers to beat Abejas de León by a score of 106–63, and he was named the player of the game.

In the postseason, Capitanes were eliminated in the first round of the playoffs by Aguacateros de Michoacán. Andriassi was honored with the Rookie of the Year award. Although his scoring output had increased only moderately to 7.9 points per game since the All-Star break, he had become one of the deadliest deep-ball shooters in the league with a 40% average behind the arc.

On November 11, 2021, Andriassi returned to the Capitanes, now a member of the NBA G League.

On March 22, 2022, Andriassi signed with expansion team Astros de Jalisco of the CIBACOPA. He helped the team win its first league title.

In July 2022, Andriassi joined the Soles de Mexicali of the LNBP. He was named the LNBP Revelation of the Year and earned his first career All-Star honors that season.

=== Mexico City Capitanes (2022–2023) ===
On November 4, 2022, Andriassi was named to the opening night roster for the Mexico City Capitanes. On January 19, 2023, Andriassi was waived. In five games, he averaged 2.2 points, one rebound and 0.8 assists while shooting 30.8 percent from the floor.

Andriassi rejoined the Astros de Jalisco for the 2023 CIBACOPA season. The team won its second consecutive CIBACOPA title, defeating the Rayos de Hermosillo in six games.

Andriassi signed with the Toros Laguna of the Liga de Básquetbol Estatal de Chihuahua (LBE) ahead of the 2025 LBE season. However, he left the team during the regular season in February to report to the Astros for the 2025 CIBACOPA season.

== National team career ==
Internationally, Andriassi has represented his country at various youth levels before playing with the Mexico national team. In 2014, he played at the Centrobasket U15 Championship in Panama, where Mexico finished in first place. He then played at the 2015 FIBA Americas Under-16 Championship and the 2016 COCABA U16 Championship, where he led the tournament in scoring with 17 points per game. Lastly, he played in the 2017 Centrobasket U17 Championship, where he averaged 23 points, 5 rebounds and 2.2 assists per game en route to a fourth-place finish.

He was first called up to the senior national team in February 2020 for 2021 FIBA AmeriCup qualification, along with his brother Josué. At the age of 19, Andriassi was the youngest member of the squad chosen by head coach Sergio Molina. He made his international debut on February 20 during Mexico's 75–61 victory over The Bahamas in Guadalajara, finishing with six points, seven rebounds and two assists.

== Personal life ==
After his single season at Universidad de las Américas Puebla (UDLAP), Andriassi continued his business administration studies at Universidad Anáhuac México during his first year with the Capitanes.
