= Ostioneros de Guaymas (basketball) =

- League: CIBACOPA
- Founded: 2008
- Arena: Gimnasio Municipal de Guaymas
- Capacity: 1,200
- Location: Guaymas, Sonora, Mexico
- Team colors: Red, white and black
- President: Rogelio Sánchez de la Vega
- Head coach: Walter McCarty
- Website: www.ostioneros.com.mx
Home	Away

The Ostioneros de Guaymas (English: Guaymas Oyster Farmers) are a Mexican professional basketball team based in Guaymas, Sonora. The Ostioneros are members of the Circuito de Baloncesto de la Costa del Pacífico (CIBACOPA) and play their games at the Gimnasio Municipal de Guaymas. They are named after the Ostioneros de Guaymas, a defunct baseball team which was a charter member of the Mexican Pacific League.

== History ==
The Ostioneros de Guaymas were established in 2008. They joined the Circuito de Baloncesto de la Costa del Pacífico (CIBACOPA), becoming the third team from Guaymas to play in the league after the Marineros and the Bucaneros. The Ostioneros de Guaymas played their debut season in 2009 and finished third in the North Zone with a 20–20 record. The team was eliminated in the quarterfinals by the Rayos de Hermosillo. Two Ostioneros players, Larry Satchell and Jorge Rochín, were named to the All-Star Game. The Ostioneros were again eliminated in the quarterfinals in 2010, losing to the Mineros de Cananea four games to three.

In 2011, the Ostioneros finished 21–17 for the fifth-best record in the league. They won their first playoff series in team history by defeating the Frayles de Guasave in seven games. Ostioneros forward Jerome Habel led the team with 19 points and 11 rebounds in their 94–61 blowout victory in game 7. In 2012, Guaymas improved to 27–11 and finished second to the Rayos de Hermosillo in wins. The Ostioneros defeated the Fuerza Guinda de Nogales in five games in the quarterfinals before beating the Tijuana Zonkeys in a seven-game semi-final series to qualify for their its first CIBACOPA finals. However, they were defeated by the Rayos de Hermosillo in a hard-fought seven-game series where two games went to overtime. The Ostioneros finished second in the standings once again in 2013 with a 23–9 record. However, they were swept 4–0 in the opening round of the playoffs by the Mineros de Cananea. Guaymas only won 11 of their 32 games the following year and were eliminated in the quarterfinals by the Tijuana Zonkeys.

Guaymas hired Andrés "Veneno" Contreras as their head coach ahead of the 2015 season. They also signed Orien Greene. The Ostioneros finished the year with a league-best 28–10 record and second in the general table, behind only the Náuticos de Mazatlán. Guaymas beat the Caballeros de Culiacán, 4–1, in the quarterfinals. However, they were defeated by the Fuerza Guinda de Nogales in the semi-finals, losing the decisive game 7 by a score of 85–74. Ahead of the 2016 season, the Ostioneros signed Devin Green. They defeated the Vaqueros de Agua Prieta in the first round of the playoffs before losing to the Náuticos de Mazatlán, 4–1, in the semi-finals. Guaymas then went 19–19 the following year for a sixth-place finish. They beat the Tijuana Zonkeys in the quarterfinals but were once again eliminated in the semi-finals, losing in five games to the Rayos de Hermosillo. By this time, a rivalry had developed between Guaymas and Hermosillo.

Guaymas hired Venezuelan coach Jesús Cordoes to take the reins ahead of the 2018 season. The team failed to reach the playoffs, losing the eight seed to the Halcones de Ciudad Obregón on a tiebreaker. Guaymas announced a new head coach, Mike Corona, ahead of the 2019 season. The team returned to the playoffs, but were eliminated by the Rayos de Hermosillo in the first round. Guaymas played only two games, going 1–1, before the season was interrupted due to the COVID-19 pandemic. The 2021 season was subsequently cancelled as well. In February 2022, Guaymas hired longtime NBA assistant John Welch as their new head coach ahead of their return to play. The Ostioneros went 19–15 that season, finishing second in the general table. However, they were eliminated in the first round of the playoffs by the Venados de Mazatlán, who came back from a 3–0 series deficit to beat Guaymas 93–85 in game 7.

For the 2023 season, the Ostioneros hired Spanish coach Pedro Carrillo to take the reins. They also signed American import Markel Crawford. They opened the season with a 141–140 victory over the Rayos de Hermosillo in six overtimes, setting a new record for the longest game in league history. The team finished seventh in the general table after compiling a 12–22 record. They were eliminated in the quarterfinals once again, losing in six games to the Astros de Jalisco. Ahead of the 2024 season, the Ostioneros hired Ben Sanders as their head coach. Crawford served as team captain and earned All-Star honors, along with teammate Jahvon Blair. Guaymas finished seventh in the general table after compiling a 15–21 record. They were eliminated in the first round of the playoffs by the Tijuana Zonkeys.

== Home arena ==
The Ostioneros play their home games at the Gimnasio Municipal de Guaymas (English: Guaymas Municipal Gymnasium), which has a capacity of 1,200 spectators. The venue is also known as el Tsunami.

== Players ==
=== Current roster ===
Note: Flags indicate national team eligibility at FIBA-sanctioned events. Players may hold other non-FIBA nationalities not displayed.

Ostioneros de Guaymas roster
Players
Coaches

Pos.	No.	Nat.	Name	Ht.	Age
SG	0	(United States)	Ivey, Jimond	1.96 m (6 ft 5 in)	33 – 29 March 1993
PG	1	(United States)	Spears, Amir	1.90 m (6 ft 3 in)	25 – 10 March 2001
PG	5	(Mexico)	Ramos, Daniel	1.86 m (6 ft 1 in)	28 – 28 July 1998
PF	7	(United States)	Agbonkpolo, Max	2.06 m (6 ft 9 in)	26 – 26 August 2000
SF	8	(Mexico)	de la Serna, Jorge	2.01 m (6 ft 7 in)	27 – 16 June 1999
PF	9	(United States)	Isom-Roberts, Terrence	2.06 m (6 ft 9 in)
SF	11	(Mexico)	Calvillo, Óscar	1.98 m (6 ft 6 in)	27 – 24 October 1998
C	15	(Canada)	Bediako, Jaden	2.08 m (6 ft 10 in)	26 – 24 September 2000
PG	17	(Mexico)	López, Christian	1.85 m (6 ft 1 in)	31 – 12 June 1995
SG	18	(Mexico)	Rivera, Bryan	1.88 m (6 ft 2 in)	31 – 30 January 1995
SG	20	(United States)	Eastern, Nojel	1.96 m (6 ft 5 in)	27 – 26 May 1999
C	34	(Trinidad and Tobago)	Hamilton, Johnny	2.13 m (7 ft 0 in)	32 – 3 February 1994

Head coach

- (United States) Walter McCarty

Assistant coach(es)

- (United States) Benjamin Bliss
- (Mexico) Francisco López Munguía

Legend

- (C) Team captain
- (I) Import player
- Injured

- Roster

== Notable players ==
Note: Flags indicate national team eligibility at FIBA-sanctioned events. Players may hold other non-FIBA nationalities not displayed.

Criteria

To appear in this section a player must have either:

- Set a club record or won an individual award while at the club
- Played at least one official international match for their national team at any time
- Played at least one official NBA match at any time.

- (Cambodia) Darrin Dorsey
- (Canada) Jahvon Blair
- (Dominican Republic) Juan Coronado
- (Dominican Republic) Luis Flores
- (Mexico) Víctor Ávila
- (Mexico) Fernando Benítez
- (Mexico) Héctor Hernández
- (Mexico) Anthony Pedroza
- (Mexico) Karim Malpica
- (Panama) Iverson Molinar
- (United States) Devin Green
- (United States) Orien Greene

== Head coaches ==
- (Mexico) LaSalle Taylor (2012)
- (Mexico) Andrés "Veneno" Contreras (2015)
- (United States) Maurice Riddick (2016–2017)
- (Venezuela) Jesús Cordoes (2018)
- (Mexico) Miguel Ángel "Mike" Corona (2019)
- (United States) John Welch (2022)
- (Spain) Pedro Carrillo (2023)
- (United States) Ben Sanders (2024–)
