= Luis Andriassi =

Mexican basketball player (born 1995)

No. 11 – Diablos Rojos del México
- Position: Point guard
- League: LNBP

Personal information
- Born: 23 October 1995 (age 31) Texcoco, State of Mexico, Mexico
- Listed height: 6 ft 0 in (1.83 m)
- Listed weight: 185 lb (84 kg)

Career information
- College: Panamerican University
- Playing career: 2019–present

Career history
- 2019: Leñadores de Durango
- 2019: Fuerza Regia de Monterrey
- 2020: Abejas de León
- 2021: Leñadores de Durango
- 2022: Pioneros de Los Mochis
- 2022: Correbasket UAT
- 2022: Dorados de Chihuahua
- 2023: Mineros de Zacatecas
- 2024: Ángeles de la Ciudad de México
- 2024: Mineros de Zacatecas
- 2025: Toros Laguna
- 2025–present: Diablos Rojos del México
- 2026–present: Ángeles de la Ciudad de México

Luis Arahón Andriassi Quintana (born 23 October 1995) is a Mexican professional basketball player.

== Career ==
Andriassi made his debut in the 2019 season with the Leñadores de Durango to play in the LNBP. In 2022 he made his debut in CIBACOPA with Pioneros de Los Mochis. In the seasons 2023 and 2024 he played with Mineros de Zacatecas. In 2025 he signed with Toros Laguna in the LBE.

== Personal life ==
His brothers Moisés and Josué are also basketball players.
