= Bryan Rivera =

Mexican basketball player (born 1995)

No. 18 – Mineros de Zacatecas
- Position: Shooting guard
- League: LNBP

Personal information
- Born: 30 January 1995 (age 31) Fresnillo, Zacatecas, Mexico
- Listed height: 6 ft 1 in (1.85 m)
- Listed weight: 185 lb (84 kg)

Career information
- College: Centro de Estudios Universitarios
- Playing career: 2017–present

Career history
- 2017–2019: Ostioneros de Guaymas
- 2019: Panteras de Aguascalientes
- 2020: Petroleros de Camargo
- 2020–2021: Plateros de Fresnillo
- 2021–present: Mineros de Zacatecas
- 2025–present: Ostioneros de Guaymas

Bryan Antonio Rivera Herrera (born 30 January 1995) is a Mexican professional basketball player for the Ostioneros de Guaymas of the Circuito de Baloncesto de la Costa del Pacífico (CIBACOPA).

== Career ==
Rivera made his debut in the 2019 season with the Panteras de Aguascalientes to play in the LNBP. In the seasons 2020 and 2021 he played with Plateros de Fresnillo. Since 2022 he is member of Mineros de Zacatecas. In 2025 he signed with Soles de Ojinaga in the LBE, the previous season he played with Pioneros de Delicias.

== National team career ==
In 2024, he was a member of the preliminary list of the Mexican national team that participated in the 2024 FIBA Men's Olympic Qualifying Tournaments.
