= Polideportivo UAS =

Arena in Sinaloa

Polideportivo UAS is a 2,902-seat indoor arena located in Culiacan, Sinaloa. It is used primarily for basketball, and is home to the Universidad Autonoma de Sinaloa basketball team, as well as the former home of the Caballeros de Culiacan basketball team. It is notable for having video screens above each sideline.

The Universidad's athletic department is headquartered at the Polideportivo. There are also offices at ground level for the various sports at the UAS, as well as a recreation center for various indoor sports.

It can accommodate up to 4,000 for concerts, boxing and lucha libre. Gloria Trevi, Alicia Villarreal, Thalia, Luis Miguel, Pepe Aguilar, Rocio Durcal, Alejandra Guzman, Mana and other performers have performed at this arena.
