= Israel Gutiérrez =

Mexican basketball player (born 1993)

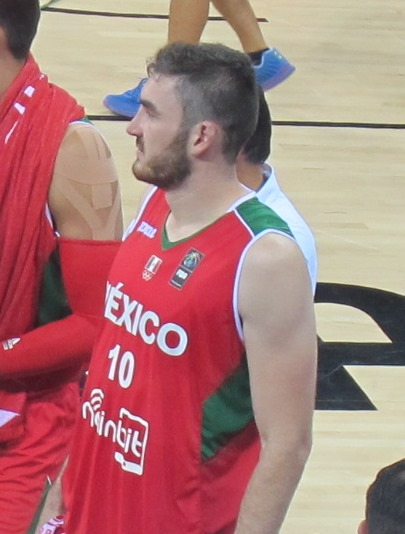

No. 25 – Lobos de Puebla
- Position: Center
- League: LNBP

Personal information
- Born: 15 January 1993 (age 33) Pachuca, Mexico
- Listed height: 6 ft 9 in (2.06 m)
- Listed weight: 235 lb (107 kg)

Career information
- College: ITESM Hidalgo

Career history
- 2014–2015: Halcones Rojos Veracruz
- 2015: Caballeros de Culiacán
- 2015–2016: Halcones Rojos Veracruz
- 2016: Boca Juniors
- 2016–2017: Garzas Guerreras de Tlaxcala
- 2017: Argentino de Junín
- 2017–2018: Aguacateros de Michoacán
- 2018: Halcones de Ciudad Obregón
- 2019: Aguacateros de Michoacán
- 2019: Astros de Jalisco
- 2020: Fuerza Regia de Monterrey
- 2020: Astros de Jalisco
- 2021: Río Breogán
- 2021: Panteras de Aguascalientes
- 2022–2025: Dorados de Chihuahua
- 2023–2025: Halcones de Xalapa
- 2026: Astros de Jalisco
- 2026–present: Lobos de Puebla

Career highlights
- CIBACOPA All-Star (2018)
Medals
Men's basketball
Representing Mexico
FIBA AmeriCup
| Bronze medal – third place | 2017 Argentina |

José Israel Gutiérrez Zermeño (born 15 January 1993) is a Mexican professional basketball player for the Astros de Jalisco of the CIBACOPA. He also represents the Mexican national team, where he participated at the 2014 FIBA Basketball World Cup. He played college basketball for the Borregos ITESM Hidalgo.

== National team career ==
Gutiérrez represented the Mexico national team at the 2014 FIBA World Cup and 2016 Centrobasket. He then won a bronze medal at the 2017 FIBA AmeriCup held in Argentina. He later captained Mexico at the 2019 Pan American Games.

== Personal life ==
Both of Gutiérrez's parents are from Jalisco: his mother from San Julián and his father from San Miguel el Alto.
