= Mantarrayas de La Paz =

- League: CIBACOPA
- Founded: 11 September 2018; 7 years ago
- History: Mantarrayas de La Paz (2019–present)
- Arena: Arena La Paz
- Capacity: 1,700
- Location: La Paz, Baja California Sur, Mexico
- Team colors: Blue, black and orange
- President: Pedro Solana Martínez
- Championships: 0
Home	Away

The Mantarrayas de La Paz (English: La Paz Manta Rays) are a Mexican professional basketball team based in La Paz, Baja California Sur. The Mantarrayas are members of the Circuito de Baloncesto de la Costa del Pacífico (CIBACOPA) and play their games in the Arena La Paz.

They were one of three professional sports teams in Baja California Sur to start playing in 2019, along with La Paz F.C. in the Liga Premier de México and Delfines de La Paz in the Liga Norte de México.

== History ==
The Lobos Marinos de La Paz (English: La Paz Sea Lions) represented the city in the original incarnation of the CIBACOPA in the 1980s and 90s. When the league was revived in 2001, they were one of the eight founding members. However, the team folded after only a few seasons due to financial difficulties. In March 2017, the previous season's CIBACOPA champions, Náuticos de Mazatlán, played an exhibition game in La Paz against a local team as part of their Gira del Campeón (Champion's Tour). The game took place at the Manuel Gómez Jiménez court, former home of the Lobos Marinos, with the Náuticos winning 93–56.

On 11 September 2018, Baja California Sur governor Carlos Mendoza Davis announced the return of CIBACOPA basketball to La Paz during the celebration of the re-inauguration of the Arena La Paz. The Mantarrayas name and corresponding logo was revealed during a press conference in January 2019 and Argentine coach Juan José Pidal was announced as the team's first head coach heading into the 2019 season. They selected Mexico national team player Irwin Ávalos with the first overall pick in the 2019 draft.

The Mantarrayas played their first official game on 28 March 2019, losing 90–86 to the Pioneros de Los Mochis in their home opener. They achieved their first ever victory the following night, beating the Pioneros 98–92 to even up the series. The team finished the regular season in fifth place with an 18–16 record. Ávalos, Antonio Peña and Tyrone White were named All-Stars. In the first round of the playoffs, the Mantarrayas defeated the Caballeros de Culiacán four games to one. They then beat the Halcones de Ciudad Obregón in a seven-game semifinal series, sealing their trip to the finals with a 105–92 victory in game 7, led by Kyle Lamonte with 26 points. Facing the Rayos de Hermosillo led by Jeremy Hollowell in the finals, the Mantarrayas initially went up 3–2 in the series after Lamonte posted a near triple-double of 34 points, 10 rebounds and eight assists in their 78–76 game 5 victory. However they suffered a humiliating 99–59 defeat in game 6 where Hollowell registered 22 points, 10 rebounds and 10 assists, before falling 90–77 in game 7 to finish as league runner-ups in their debut season.

The Mantarrayas hired Uruguayan coach Federico Camiña ahead of the 2020 season. The team opened the year with a 88–82 loss to the Tijuana Zonkeys on 12 March, and played only a handful of games before the season was interrupted due to the COVID-19 pandemic in Mexico.

The Mantarrayas announced that the team would not participate in the 2022 season due to the continued risk of COVID-19. They subsequently opted out of the 2023 season as well.

== Notable players ==
Note: Flags indicate national team eligibility at FIBA-sanctioned events. Players may hold other non-FIBA nationalities not displayed.

Criteria

To appear in this section a player must have either:

- Set a club record or won an individual award while at the club
- Played at least one official international match for their national team at any time
- Played at least one official NBA match at any time.

- (Mexico) Irwin Ávalos

== Head coaches ==
- (Argentina) Juan José Pidal (2019)
- (Uruguay) Federico Camiña (2020)

== Honours ==
=== Domestic competitions ===
- Circuito de Baloncesto de la Costa del Pacífico
  - Runners-up (1): 2019
