= Juan José Pidal =

Argentine basketball coach (born 1979)

Personal information
- Born: 30 July 1980 (age 46) Rosario, Argentina
- Position: Head coach
- Coaching career: 2008–present

Career history

Coaching
- 2008: Liga de Quito
- 2009–2010: MAVORT
- 2012–2015: UTE de Quito
- 2016: Guaiqueríes de Margarita
- 2016: Cangrejeros de Monagas
- 2017: Club de Baloncesto de Macas
- 2017–2018: Santos del Potosí
- 2019: Mantarrayas de La Paz
- 2020–2021: Leñadores de Durango
- 2021–2023: Plateros de Fresnillo
- 2022–2023: Fuerza Regia de Monterrey (women)
- 2024: Toros Laguna
- 2024: Piratas de Los Lagos
- 2024–2025: El Calor de Cancún
- 2025: El Calor de Cancún (women)

Juan José Pidal (born 30 July 1979) is an Argentine basketball coach. He is the head coach of the El Calor de Cancún.

== Coaching career ==
Pidal started his coaching career in Ecuador with Liga de Quito in the Liga Ecuatoriana de Baloncesto, he also coached MAVORT and UTE de Quito where he won the national championship.

In 2016 he joined Guaiqueríes de Margarita of the Superliga Profesional de Baloncesto. On 2017, he signed with Santos del Potosí of the LNBP. He also coached Leñadores de Durango and Plateros de Fresnillo from the same league. In 2019, Pidal was the first coach in the history of Mantarrayas de La Paz in CIBACOPA. In 2022, Pidal signed with the Fuerza Regia de Monterrey (women) of the LNBPF. In 2024, he coached for the first time in the LBE signing with Toros Laguna. In 2024, he became the first coach in the history of El Calor de Cancún.
