= Walter McCarty =

American basketball player and coach (born 1974)

Ostioneros de Guaymas
- Title: Head coach
- League: CIBACOPA

Personal information
- Born: February 1, 1974 (age 52) Evansville, Indiana, U.S.
- Listed height: 6 ft 10 in (2.08 m)
- Listed weight: 245 lb (111 kg)

Career information
- High school: William Henry Harrison (Evansville, Indiana)
- College: Kentucky (1993–1996)
- NBA draft: 1996: 1st round, 19th overall pick
- Drafted by: New York Knicks
- Playing career: 1996–2006
- Position: Power forward / small forward
- Number: 40, 0
- Coaching career: 2007–present

Career history

Playing
- 1996–1997: New York Knicks
- 1997–2005: Boston Celtics
- 2005: Phoenix Suns
- 2005–2006: Los Angeles Clippers

Career highlights
- NCAA champion (1996); Third-team Parade All-American (1992)

Career NBA statistics
- Points: 3,056 (5.2 ppg)
- Rebounds: 1,554 (2.6 rpg)
- Assists: 670 (1.1 apg)
- Stats at NBA.com
- Stats at Basketball Reference

Walter Lee McCarty (born February 1, 1974) is an American former professional basketball player, and current head coach of the Ostioneros de Guaymas in the Circuito de Baloncesto de la Costa del Pacífico (CIBACOPA). McCarty played for the NBA's New York Knicks, Boston Celtics, Phoenix Suns, and the Los Angeles Clippers. He last served as head coach of the Evansville Purple Aces from 2018 to 2019.

== Early life and college career ==
McCarty was born in Evansville, Indiana. He played at William Henry Harrison High School, and as a senior in 1992 led his team to the Evansville II sectional championship and was named to the Indiana All Star Team. McCarty played college basketball at the University of Kentucky where he was a part of the team that won the NCAA championship in 1996. In 1994, McCarty's made three-pointer completed Kentucky's 31-point comeback over LSU—the biggest second-half rally in NCAA history. He was selected by the Knicks with the 19th pick in the 1996 NBA draft.

== NBA career ==
McCarty played for the Knicks until October 1997, when he was traded to the Celtics. McCarty played in all 82 games that season, starting 64 of them. He also established career highs in virtually every category during this season. Over the next few years, he was one of Boston's top options off the bench, often making a key defensive play or three point shot. He became a fan favorite in Boston for his gutsy play, hustle, and penchant for making the big shot. He was also a favorite of Hall of Fame player, coach and longtime announcer Tommy Heinsohn, who often exclaimed, "I love Walter!" after some of McCarty's plays.

In February 2005, McCarty was traded, along with an undisclosed amount of cash, to the Suns for a second-round pick as a result of the Celtics' youth movement. He signed with the Clippers in the offseason of 2005.

== Coaching career ==
In June 2007, McCarty accepted an assistant coach job at the University of Louisville under head men's basketball coach Rick Pitino, under whom he played at Kentucky and with the Celtics.

In June 2010, McCarty was named as an assistant coach for the Indiana Pacers under Jim O'Brien, replacing Lester Conner. Walter also played for O'Brien during his tenure with the Celtics. In 2011, McCarty was let go by the Pacers when Frank Vogel took over as head coach. In August 2013, McCarty joined the Boston Celtics as an assistant coach for the 2013–14 NBA season.

On March 22, 2018, McCarty was hired as the head men's basketball coach in University of Evansville. On November 12, 2019, McCarty led Evansville to their first victory over a #1 ranked opponent in a 67–64 victory over Kentucky at Rupp Arena in Lexington. On December 27, 2019, McCarty was placed on administrative leave after UE received "a troubling report about Coach McCarty’s interactions with a member of the campus community" which appeared to violate Title IX. UE stated that they have "received reports of unwelcome conduct by Coach McCarty since his arrival in March 2018" and that McCarty's success does not "in any way outweigh the need to uphold the standards that define our university." Assistant coach Bennie Seltzer was named as interim coach. After additional alleged reports of inappropriate conduct came to light, Evansville fired McCarty on January 21, 2020.

In a statement defending McCarty, his attorney said he did not engage in any sexual misconduct and that University made an unfair rush to judgment. McCarty's attorney also pointed out: "The investigation was not independent - UE hired the same national law firm to conduct the investigation that it previously hired to draft the University policies now under review. UE then actively participated in the investigation and, prior to its conclusion, terminated Walter without him having an opportunity to defend himself in accordance with his contract or UE’s Title IX Policy."

In a statement, UE school officials said that McCarty had been counseled the previous year for inappropriate behavior, and had taken part in Title IX training. The statement added that while the investigation would continue, "the facts uncovered thus far" demanded McCarty's immediate firing.

In a letter to the university community obtained by local NBC affiliate WFIE-TV, UE president Christopher Pietruszkiewicz said that the investigation had uncovered "persistent and troublesome facts" about McCarty's behavior, and that McCarty had allegedly attempted to "improperly influence witnesses." Based on this and other incidents, Pietruszkiewicz and other school officials decided that even though the investigation was still underway, McCarty had violated the terms of his contract, making it "untenable" for him to remain as head coach. Both the university's statement and the letter from Pietruszkiewicz said, "There is no place at UE for any behavior by any university employee or student that jeopardizes the safety and security of others." In April 2021, a former student sued the university and McCarty alleging he sexually assaulted her.

In the midst of the firing, supporters of McCarty also shared their suspicions that three hours after they fired McCarty, the University of Evansville hired new head coach Todd Lickliter to a multi-year contract.

McCarty was hired as head coach of the Ostioneros de Guaymas, a Mexican team in the Circuito de Baloncesto de la Costa del Pacífico (CIBACOPA). The following year, he took over the Rayos de Hermosillo and led the team to an appearance in the CIBACOPA finals.

In September 2023, McCarty was hired as the head coach of the Freseros de Irapuato in the Liga Nacional de Baloncesto Profesional (LNBP). He returned for his second season with the Rayos de Hermosillo in 2024.

== NBA career statistics ==
Legend
GP	Games played	GS	Games started	MPG	Minutes per game
FG%	Field goal percentage	3P%	3-point field goal percentage	FT%	Free throw percentage
RPG	Rebounds per game	APG	Assists per game	SPG	Steals per game
BPG	Blocks per game	PPG	Points per game	**Bold**	Career high
*	Led the league

=== Regular season ===
Year	Team	GP	GS	MPG	FG%	3P%	FT%	RPG	APG	SPG	BPG	PPG
1996–97	New York	35	0	5.4	.382	.286	.571	.7	.4	.2	.3	1.8
1997–98	Boston	**82***	**64**	**28.5**	.404	.309	.742	**4.4**	**2.2**	**1.3**	**.5**	**9.6**
1998–99	Boston	32	4	20.6	.362	.260	.702	3.6	1.3	.8	.4	5.7
1999–00	Boston	61	5	14.4	.339	.309	.722	1.8	1.1	.4	.4	3.8
2000–01	Boston	60	3	7.9	.357	.339	**.786**	1.4	.7	.2	.1	2.2
2001–02	Boston	56	0	12.8	**.444**	**.394**	.684	2.3	.7	.3	.1	3.8
2002–03	Boston	**82**	8	23.8	.414	.367	.622	3.5	1.3	1.0	.3	6.1
2003–04	Boston	77	23	24.7	.388	.374	.756	3.1	1.6	.9	.3	7.9
2004–05	Boston	44	0	12.6	.413	.333	.533	1.8	.6	.3	.2	3.7
2004–05	Phoenix	28	0	12.6	.388	.385	.500	2.2	.4	.4	.2	3.5
2005–06	L.A. Clippers	36	1	9.8	.333	.222	.571	1.9	.6	.2	.1	2.4
Career		593	108	17.5	.392	.346	.698	2.6	1.1	.6	.3	5.2

=== Playoffs ===
Year	Team	GP	GS	MPG	FG%	3P%	FT%	RPG	APG	SPG	BPG	PPG
1997	New York	2	0	2.0	**1.000**	–	–	.0	.0	.5	.0	2.0
2002	Boston	**14**	0	14.0	.447	.167	.778	2.4	.3	.3	.0	3.1
2003	Boston	10	**8**	**35.2**	.480	**.404**	**.857**	4.3	**2.2**	**.8**	**.5**	**9.9**
2004	Boston	4	4	31.8	.478	.400	–	**5.3**	2.0	.5	**.5**	7.0
2005	Phoenix	8	0	6.9	.222	.333	.000	.8	.4	.3	.3	.8
2006	L.A. Clippers	8	0	1.2	.250	.000	–	.1	.0	.0	.0	.3
Career		46	12	16.2	.457	.348	.722	2.3	.8	.4	.2	4.0

== Head coaching record ==
Record table
Season	Team	Overall	Conference	Standing	Postseason
Evansville Purple Aces (Missouri Valley Conference) (2018–2019)
2018–19	Evansville	11–21	5–13	10th	
2019–20	Evansville	9–4	0–0		
Evansville:		20–25 (.444)	5–13 (.278)		
Total:		20–25 (.444)			

== Personal life ==
He appeared in the 1998 film He Got Game as the character "Mance". In 2003, McCarty released the CD Moment for Love, an R&B/soul album to generally positive reviews. He sang the national anthem prior to All-Star Saturday Night on the eve of the 2006 NBA All-Star Game. McCarty has two daughters, Gabrielle and Sasha.
