= Jeremy Hollowell =

American basketball player (born 1994)

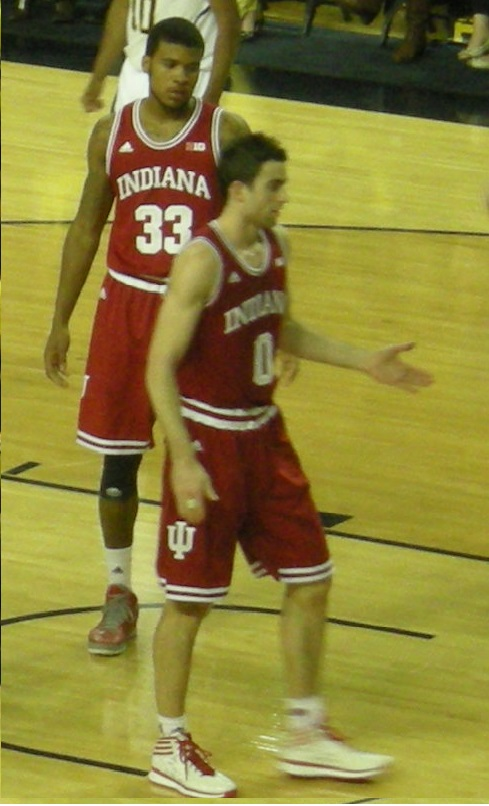
- Hollowell (left) with Indiana in March 2014

Bauru
- Position: Power forward
- League: NBB

Personal information
- Born: February 25, 1994 (age 32) Cleveland, Ohio
- Listed height: 6 ft 8 in (2.03 m)
- Listed weight: 220 lb (100 kg)

Career information
- High school: Lawrence Central (Indianapolis, Indiana)
- College: Indiana (2012–2014); Georgia State (2015–2017)
- NBA draft: 2017: undrafted
- Playing career: 2017–present

Career history
- 2017–2019: Erie BayHawks
- 2019: Rayos de Hermosillo
- 2019–2020: Ironi Nes Ziona
- 2020–2021: Ionikos Nikaias
- 2021–2022: Merkezefendi Bld. Denizli Basket
- 2022: Rayos de Hermosillo
- 2022: Halcones UV Xalapa
- 2022: Búcaros de Bucaramanga
- 2023: Brillantes del Zulia
- 2023–present: Bauru

Career highlights
- CIBACOPA champion (2019); CIBACOPA MVP (2019); CIBACOPA Finals MVP (2019); CIBACOPA All-Star (2019); Second-team All-Sun Belt (2017)

Jeremy Mathew Hollowell (born February 25, 1994) is an American professional basketball player who last played for Merkezefendi Belediyesi Denizli Basket of the Turkish Basketbol Süper Ligi. Hollowell played college basketball for the Georgia State Panthers after a stop with the Indiana Hoosiers.

== High school career ==
Hollowell attended Lawrence Central High School in Indianapolis where he averaged 23.9 points and nine rebounds per game as a senior. He finished his career with over 1,000 points. And he was ranked the No. 7 small forward by Scout and was the 42nd-best overall prospect in the 2012 class according to the ESPN100.

== College career ==
Jeremy Hollowell played two seasons at Indiana before transferring to play the remainder of his career for Georgia State.

=== Indiana ===
During his freshman season, Hollowell played in 33 games off the bench and averaged 2.8 points and 2.1 rebounds per game. In his sophomore year he played in 29 games, making 15 starts, averaging 5.7 points and 3.5 rebounds.

=== Georgia State ===
Hollowell redshirted the 2014–15 season due to NCAA transfer regulations. During that year, Georgia State won the Sun Belt Championship and advanced to the third round of the NCAA tournament after upsetting Baylor. The game ended with a noteworthy buzzer-beater shot by RJ Hunter, former AAU teammate and childhood friend of Hollowell's. RJ and GSU head coach, Ron Hunter, had been a part of Jeremy's life since he was young.

In his junior season, he started all 30 games and led the Panthers in scoring (14.8 PPG), shot 43.6 percent from the floor and 81 percent from the free throw line. Hollowell achieved his first career double-double with 22 points and 11 rebounds at South Alabama. He led the Panthers in scoring with 23 points at Ole Miss. After scoring 23 points in the Panthers' second meeting with South Alabama, Hollowell was named Sun Belt Player of the Week.

As a senior, Hollowell shot 42.6 percent from the floor and 33.5 percent from three. Against Auburn, he scored 20 points and went 8-of-8 from the free throw line. In a return to his home state, Hollowell had 15 points and five rebounds at No. 15 Purdue. Against Wright State, he hit a career-high six 3-pointers and finished with 22 points. In conference play, he was named Sun Belt Player of the Week after a 19-point, eight-rebound game at Louisiana Lafayette. On Senior Day, he recorded a double-double against in-state rival, Georgia Southern, finishing with 15 points and 12 rebounds.

== Professional career ==
The Erie BayHawks, Atlanta Hawks NBA G League affiliate, selected Jeremy Hollowell with the 18th pick of the 1st round of the 2017 G League Draft. He was retained on the roster the following year.

On March 28, 2019, Hollowell signed with the Mexican team Rayos de Hermosillo of the CIBACOPA. In 52 games played for Hermosillo, he finished the season as the league fifth best scorer with 19.5 points per game, to go with 7.4 rebounds, 3.5 assists and 1 steal per game. Hollowell won the CIBACOPA championship title with Rayos de Hermosillo, while earning the Finals MVP honors.

On August 13, 2019, Hollowell signed a two-year deal with Ironi Nes Ziona of the Israeli Premier League. On December 1, 2019, Hollowell recorded a season-high 23 points, while shooting 9-of-13 from the field, along with eight rebounds in a 106–115 double overtime loss to Hapoel Gilboa Galil. He appeared in 29 games for Nes Ziona, averaging 11.5 points, 5.2 rebounds and 2 assists per game. On February 13, 2020, he parted ways with Nes Ziona.

Hollowell signed with Ionikos Nikaias of the Greek Basket League on September 22, 2020.

On June 23, 2021, he signed with Merkezefendi Belediyesi Denizli Basket of the Basketbol Süper Ligi.

== Personal life ==
Jeremy is the son of Chandra Lockett and James Hollowell and has three brothers and two sisters.
