= Cal Poly Pomona Broncos men's basketball =

Cal Poly Pomona Broncos Men's Basketball
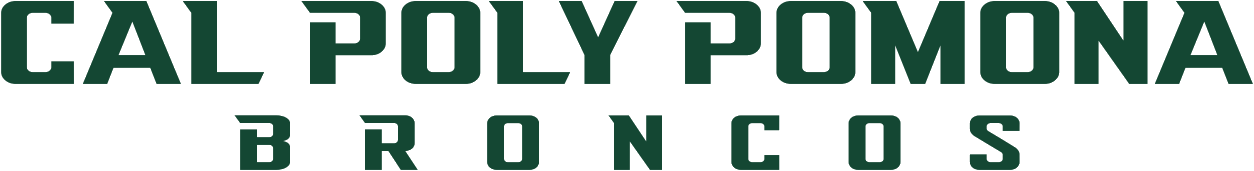
- University: California State Polytechnic University, Pomona
- Head coach: Greg Kamansky (25th season)
- Conference: California Collegiate Athletic Association
- Location: Pomona, California
- Arena: Kellogg Arena (capacity: 4,765)
- Nickname: Broncos
- Colors

Uniforms
Home	Away	Alternate

NCAA tournament champions
- 2010
Other NCAA tournament results
Runner-up	2009
Final Four	2009, 2010
Elite Eight	1964, 2003, 2005, 2009, 2010
Sweet Sixteen	1962, 1964, 2003, 2005, 2009, 2010
Appearances	1962, 1964, 1976, 2003, 2004, 2005, 2007, 2009, 2010, 2013, 2014, 2015, 2016, 2018, 2019, 2020, 2022

Conference tournament champions
- 2013, 2015

Conference regular-season champions
- 1981, 2005, 2009, 2010, 2013, 2018, 2019

The Cal Poly Pomona Broncos Men's Basketball team is the college basketball program representing California State Polytechnic University, Pomona (Cal Poly Pomona). The Broncos play in the California Collegiate Athletic Association (CCAA) in NCAA Division II.

Cal Poly Pomona won its first NCAA championship in 2010 and has appeared in 17 NCAA Tournaments. It has been described to as a "powerhouse" due to its strong historical record.

The Broncos presently play their home games in Kellogg Gymnasium, with a capacity of 4,765 for basketball.

== Record versus current conference rivals ==
The Broncos have a combined all-time record of 1,148-913 (.557) as of the 2023-24 season .

Rival	Wins	Losses	Average
Cal State East Bay	16	2	.889
Cal State Dominguez Hills	45	38	.542
Cal State L.A.	59	53	.527
Cal State Monterey Bay	19	5	.792
Cal State San Bernardino	32	23	.582
Cal State San Marcos	2	3	.400
Cal State Stanislaus	29	8	.784
Chico State	30	18	.625
Humboldt State	18	12	.600
San Francisco State	41	15	.732
Sonoma State	31	17	.646
UC San Diego	24	14	.632
Total	346	208	.625

== All-Americans ==
Eight Broncos have been named All-Americans in school history,

- 1962–63: Bill Leedom, Third Team
- 1965–66: Paul Scranton, Third Team
- 1971–72: Alan Smith, Honorable Mention
- 1972–73: Terry Ross, Second Team
- 2004–05: Jeff Bonds, NABC
- 2008–09: Larry Gordon, NABC, Division II Bulletin
- 2012–13: Mitchel Anderson, NABC
- 2014–15: Terrence Drisdom, NABC

== Broncos overseas ==
- Angelo Tsagarakis: France, Greece (2008–present)
- Jeff Bonds: Spain, Great Britain (2005-?)
- Larry Gordon: Austria, Germany, Kazakhstan (2010–present)
- Matthew Rosser: Philippines (2012–Present)
- Tobias Jahn: Germany (2012–Present)
- Terrence Drisdom: Japan (2017–Present)
- William Christmas: Germany (2021–Present)

== See also ==
- Cal Poly Pomona Broncos
