= Eric Weissling =

American basketball coach (born 1988)

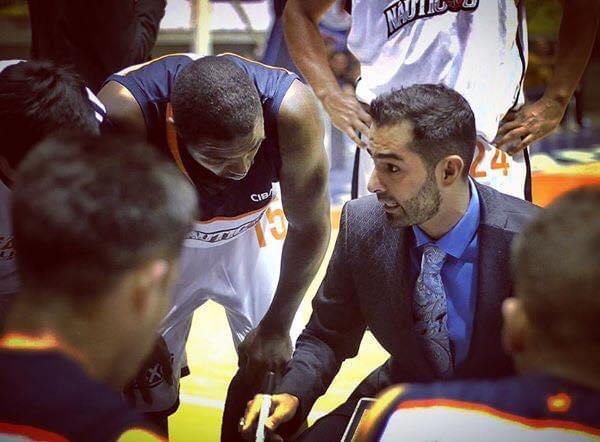

Personal information
- Born: Eric Luis Weissling Pallares; January 20, 1988 (age 38) Albuquerque, New Mexico, U.S.
- Occupation: Professional basketball coach
- Years active: 2004-present
- Height: 182 cm (6 ft 0 in)
- Weight: 82 kg (181 lb)

Eric Weissling (born January 20, 1988) is a professional basketball coach of Mexican, American and German descent.

== Career ==
=== Player assistant ===
He began his professional career as a player assistant with the San Antonio Spurs of the NBA from 2004 to 2012, working with players such as: Tim Duncan, Manu Ginobili, Tony Parker, Bruce Bowen and many more. During these seven years he was part of two NBA championships; the first in 2004–2005 against Detroit Pistons and the second in 2006–2007 against the Cleveland Cavaliers.

=== Training and varied roles ===
When he finished his training at St. Mary's University, he decided to develop as a coach and began to work in professional teams of leagues affiliated with FIBA, the Liga Nacional de Baloncesto Profesional (LNBP) and the Circuito de Baloncesto de la Costa del Pacífico (CIBACOPA). During this period he worked as a player developer, scout, video analysis and training for teams such as: Halcones UV Xalapa (2011-2013) with a lapse of an intermission back to the San Antonio Spurs; Pioneros de Los Mochis (2014) as head coach in some games; Halcones Rojos de Veracruz (2014-2016) as interim strength and conditioning coach as well as headhunter; Nauticos de Mazatlán (2015-2018); Garzas de Plata UAEH (2016-2017) that during this time, he graduated from Xavier University with a master's degree in Athlete Development and Coaching Education; Laguneros de La Comarca (2018-2019), Panteras de Aguascalientes (2019) and Venados de Mazatlán (2019-2020).

=== Coaching roles ===
In 2013, he was assistant coach of the Mexico National Team 2013 Gold Medalist FIBA and served as main video coordinator in charge of the exploration towards the 2013 FIBA Americas Championship, where they played a historic role winning the gold medal, same that was not obtained by the National Team of Mexico since 1973. They also received the "National Sports Award", Gold medal in the Central American Championship COCABA. In 2014 he returned to the National Team as a scout and assistant coach for the Central American and Caribbean Games.

In 2016, he was head coach of the Nauticos de Mazatlán, during that time he was the youngest head coach to win a championship in the Professional Basketball League CIBACOPA at age 27; that same year Latinbasket.com would appoint him Coach of the year; also won the Jump 10 World Hoops Challenge in Shanghai, China, with the National Nautical Team of Mexico.

He led Laguneros de La Comarca as head coach for the inaugural season of this young professional LNBP team in 2018. He was considered the youngest head coach to lead a team in the LNBP, breaking barriers and records that few have achieved before, while commanding a team of the highest professional league from Mexico at the age of 30. As of 2019, Weissling made the decision to leave Laguneros and go over and lead a more recognized organization in Panteras de Aguascalientes to close the end of the 2018-2019 LNBP season.

In the 2019–2020 season, Weisling worked hard to return to the United States to the NBA and NBA G League. Before focusing on the adventure in the United States, Coach Weissling led the National Team of Venados de México to participate in the World Top Ten Basketball Challenge 2019.

In the fall of 2019, Weissling competed in the NBA G-League preseason with a collective all-star team from Mexico composed of players from the CIBACOPA professional league. The game was played against the Rio Grande Valley Vipers, current champions of the 2019 NBA G-League.

To kick off 2020, Weisling was appointed to the staff of the Mexico men's national team, Due to the COVID-19 pandemic, the Olympic preliminaries were suspended until 2021, when Mexico competed with Russia, Germany and to qualify for the 2020 Olympics.

As Weissling assumed the responsibility of helping the best Mexican players at the highest international level, he was also be appointed as the new head coach of the Vietnam National League VBA Hanoi Buffalo.

=== Teams ===
- 2004-2011 San Antonio Spurs, NBA, Assistant Player and Assistant Costume (champions 2005 and 2007).
- 2011-2013 Halcones UV Xalapa, LNBP, Assistant Coach and Head of Scouting.
- 2013 Mexico National Team, FIBA COCABA Central American Championship, Assistant Coach and Head of Scouting (gold medal).
- Mexico National Team 2013, FIBA Americas Championships, Assistant Coach and Head of Scouting (gold medal).
- 2014 Pioneros de Los Mochis, CIBACOPA Professional, FIBA Mexico, Assistant Coach and Head of Scouting.
- 2014 Mexico National Team, Central American and Caribbean Games, Assistant Coach and Head of Scouting.
- 2014-2015 Halcones Rojos de Veracruz, LNBP, Assistant Coach and Head of Scouting.
- 2015 Náuticos de Mazatlán, CIBACOPA, Assistant Coach and Head of Scouting.
- 2015-2016 Halcones Rojos de Veracruz, LNBP, Assistant Coach, Head of Scouting.
- 2016 Náuticos de Mazatlán, CIBACOPA, Head Coach. (champions, coach of the year).
- National Nautical Team of Mexico 2016, Jump 10 World Hoops Challenge, Shanghai China; Assistant coach (champions).
- 2016-2017 Garzas de Plata UAEH, LNBP, Assistant Coach and Head of Scouting.
- 2017 Náuticos de Mazatlán, CIBACOPA, Head Coach.
- 2018 Náuticos de Mazatlán, CIBACOPA, Head Coach.
- 2018-2019 Laguneros de la Comarca, LNBP; Coach.
- Panteras de Aguascalientes, LNBP; Coach.
- 2019 Venados de Mazatlán, CIBACOPA, Head Coach.
- Mexico National Team Venados 2019, Jump 10 World Hoops Challenge, Shanghai China; Head Coach (silver medal)
- CIBACOPA Mexico 2019 National Team, Head Coach; NBA G-League Preseason (vs. Rio Grande Valley Vipers)
