= Astros de Jalisco =

- League: LNBP; CIBACOPA
- Founded: 2019; 7 years ago
- History: Astros de Jalisco (2019–present)
- Arena: Arena Astros
- Capacity: 4,000
- Location: Guadalajara, Jalisco
- Team colors: Blue, white and sky blue
- President: Teo Zubía
- Head coach: Iván Déniz
- Ownership: Roberto Hemuda Jr.
- Championships: 4 CIBACOPA (2022, 2023, 2025, 2026)
Home	Away

Astros de Jalisco (English: Jalisco Astros) is a Mexican professional basketball team based in Guadalajara, Jalisco. The Astros are part the CIBACOPA and the Liga Nacional de Baloncesto Profesional, the top professional basketball league in Mexico. The team plays its home games at the Arena Astros, with a capacity of 4,000 spectators.

== History ==
The Astros de Jalisco were presented in February 2019 as a joint effort between the government of the State of Jalisco and Grupo Multimedios, a media conglomerate.

The Astros were one of the three new teams that debuted in the 2019–20 LNBP season, the other two were the Dorados de Chihuahua and the Plateros de Fresnillo.

On July 12, 2022, Astros won its first CIBACOPA championship in its debut season in the league, after defeating the Rayos de Hermosillo 91–87 in the sixth game of the final. The Astros' American guard Javion Blake was named the Finals MVP.

== Honors ==
CIBACOPA

- Champions (4): 2022, 2023, 2025, 2026

== Players ==
=== Current roster ===
Note: Flags indicate national team eligibility at FIBA-sanctioned events. Players may hold other non-FIBA nationalities not displayed.

Astros de Jalisco roster
Players
Coaches

Pos.	No.	Nat.	Name	Ht.	Age
PG	1	(United States)	Floyd, Jasper	1.91 m (6 ft 3 in)	25 – 20 January 2001
PG	3	(United States)	Yoakum, William	1.95 m (6 ft 5 in)	28 – 17 July 1998
F	6	(Cuba)	Mencia, Yoanki	1.98 m (6 ft 6 in)	28 – 23 September 1997
G	7	(Mexico)	Andriassi, Moisés	1.85 m (6 ft 1 in)	26 – 1 March 2000
SF	8	(Mexico)	Ayala, David	1.92 m (6 ft 4 in)	24 – 10 March 2002
SG	9	(Mexico)	Cruz, Francisco	1.91 m (6 ft 3 in)	36 – 3 October 1989
PG	10	(United States)	Anderson III, Avery	1.91 m (6 ft 3 in)	25 – 26 September 2000
SG	12	(Mexico)	Andrade, Pablo
C	13	(Venezuela)	Ascanio, José	2.04 m (6 ft 8 in)	30 – 10 January 1996
SF	14	(United States)	Phelps, Eugene	1.98 m (6 ft 6 in)	36 – 23 January 1990
SG	20	(United States)	Davis, Gage	1.93 m (6 ft 4 in)	30 – 9 December 1995
C	99	(Cuba)	Bombino, Pedro	2.08 m (6 ft 10 in)	26 – 21 March 2000

Head coach

- (Spain) Iván Déniz

Assistant coach(es)

- (Spain) Antonio Herrera
- (Argentina) Federico Corbaz
- (Mexico) Mario Saucedo

Legend

- (C) Team captain
- Injured

- Roster
Updated: 24 March 2026

== Notable players ==
Note: Flags indicate national team eligibility at FIBA-sanctioned events. Players may hold other non-FIBA nationalities not displayed.

Criteria

To appear in this section a player must have either:

- Set a club record or won an individual award while at the club
- Played at least one official international match for their national team at any time
- Played at least one official NBA match at any time.

- (Dominican Republic) Rigoberto Mendoza
- (United Kingdom) Kavell Bigby-Williams
- (Lebanon) Jarrid Famous
- (Mexico) Moisés Andriassi
- (Mexico) Irwin Ávalos
- (Mexico) Gustavo Ayón
- (Mexico) Jorge Gutiérrez
- (Mexico) Israel Gutiérrez
- (Mexico) Héctor Hernández
- (Nigeria) Ike Diogu
- (Panama) Ernesto Oglivie
- (Puerto Rico) Ramón Clemente
- (Puerto Rico) Timajh Parker-Rivera
- (Puerto Rico) Ángel Daniel Vassallo
- (United States) Jordan Loveridge
- (United States) Toure' Murry
- (United States) Shamorie Ponds
- (United States) Craig Sword
- (United States) Darius Johnson-Odom
- (Venezuela) Heissler Guillent
