= Diablos Rojos del México (basketball) =

- League: LNBP
- Founded: 2024
- Arena: Gimnasio Olímpico Juan de la Barrera
- Capacity: 5,242
- Location: Benito Juárez, Mexico City, Mexico
- Team colors: Red, black and white
- General manager: Nick Lagios
- Head coach: Gustavo de Conti
- Ownership: Fundación Alfredo Harp Helú
- Championships: 1 (2024)
- Website: diablosrojosbasquetbol.com.mx
Home	Away	Third

The Diablos Rojos del México (English: Mexico Red Devils) are a professional Mexican basketball team, based in Mexico City, Mexico. The Diablos Rojos compete in the Liga Nacional de Baloncesto Profesional (LNBP), the top professional basketball league in Mexico.

== History ==
The team was established in May 2024, owned by the Fundación Alfredo Harp Helú, that also owns the Diablos Rojos baseball team of the Mexican League. The club was officially presented on 22 May 2024 as an expansion team ahead of the 2024 LNBP season and Argentine Nicolás Casalánguida was announced as manager of the club.

The club initially disclosed its intentions to play in the Palacio de los Deportes, that hosted the basketball tournament at the 1968 Summer Olympics and has a capacity of 20,000 spectators. However, on 11 May 2024, the team announced that they would be playing in the smaller Gimnasio Olímpico Juan de la Barrera that can seat 5,242 spectators and was previously used by Capitanes de Ciudad de México from 2017 to 2020.

The Diablos Rojos made their debut on 22 July 2024 losing against Santos de San Luis 88–89 in the Gimnasio Olímpico Juan de la Barrera. The team finished the season third with a 21–11 record and qualified for the playoffs. On 16 November 2024, the team won the West Zone Championship defeating Soles de Mexicali 4 games to 2, qualifying for the LNBP Championship Series, where they faced the Halcones de Xalapa. The Diablos Rojos won the 2024 LNBP championship after defeating the Halcones in five games and became the first team based in Mexico City to win an LNBP title.

== Players ==
=== Current roster ===
Note: Flags indicate national team eligibility at FIBA-sanctioned events. Players may hold other non-FIBA nationalities not displayed.

Diablos Rojos del México roster
Players
Coaches

Pos.	No.	Nat.	Name	Ht.	Age
C	0	(Brazil)	Djaló, Yan	2.04 m (6 ft 8 in)	24 – 3 November 2001
PG	6	(Argentina)	Scala, Santiago	1.87 m (6 ft 2 in)	35 – 6 February 1991
G	7	(Mexico)	Cruz, Alberto	1.91 m (6 ft 3 in)	27 – 3 September 1999
SG	9	(United States)	Drechsel, Trey	1.98 m (6 ft 6 in)	30 – 27 July 1996
SF	10	(Brazil)	Cardoso, Brunão	2.02 m (6 ft 8 in)	23 – 11 November 2002
PG	11	(Mexico)	Andriassi, Luis	1.83 m (6 ft 0 in)	30 – 23 October 1995
PF	12	(Mexico)	Domínguez, Rodrigo	2.03 m (6 ft 8 in)	25 – 8 March 2001
SF	15	(United States)	Robinson, Brandon	1.98 m (6 ft 6 in)	37 – 25 March 1989
G	22	(United States)	Smith, Michael	1.93 m (6 ft 4 in)	31 – 6 July 1995
PF	23	(United States)	Scott, Devon	2.06 m (6 ft 9 in)	32 – 7 April 1994
F	24	(Venezuela)	Carrera, Michael	1.96 m (6 ft 5 in)	33 – 7 January 1993
PG	26	(Mexico)	García, Javier		23 – 26 February 2003
PG	66	(United States)	Cosey, Glenn	1.83 m (6 ft 0 in)	34 – 17 February 1992

Head coach

- (Brazil) Gustavo de Conti

Assistant coach(es)

- (Brazil) Bruno Porto

Legend

- (C) Team captain
- Injured

- Roster
Updated: 5 December 2024

== Season by season ==
Season	League	Pos.	W–L	Postseason
2024	LNBP	3rd	21–11	Won Finals (Halcones de Xalapa)
