= Halcones de Ciudad Obregón =

- League: CIBACOPA
- Founded: 2016
- History: Halcones de Ciudad Obregón (2016–present)
- Arena: Arena ITSON
- Capacity: 3,500
- Location: Ciudad Obregón, Sonora, Mexico
- Team colors: Orange, grey and white
- President: Rafael Lira Valenzuela
- Head coach: Manu Gelpi
- Championships: 1 (2017)
- Website: Official site
| Home | Away | Third |

The Halcones de Ciudad Obregón (English: Ciudad Obregón Falcons) are a Mexican professional basketball team based in Ciudad Obregón, Sonora, Mexico. The Halcones are members of the Circuito de Baloncesto de la Costa del Pacífico (CIBACOPA) and play their games in the Arena ITSON.

== History ==
The Trigueros de Ciudad Obregón were founding members of CIBACOPA in 2001, and won three championships until the issue of poor attendance forced the club to abandon the league in 2013. The Halcones were founded in 2016 by a group of local businessmen looking to bring professional basketball back to the city to develop and promote the sport. The team joined the Circuito de Baloncesto de la Costa del Pacífico (CIBACOPA) as an expansion team for the 2016 season, where they had a seventh-place regular-season finish before getting swept 4–0 by the eventual champions Nauticos de Mazatlán in the first round of the playoffs.

Ahead of the 2017 season, the Halcones signed American imports Kevin Capers, Mike Glover and Glen Rice Jr. That year in the playoffs, they defeated the Nauticos in seven games before dispatching the Pioneros de Los Mochis in five. In the finals, they defeated Rayos de Hermosillo 4–2 to win their first-ever championship. Rice Jr. was named Finals MVP after averaging a near-30-point triple double in the series.

In 2018, the team added Isaiah Wilkerson, J. R. Giddens and former Halcón Geron Johnson. The Halcones had a poor regular season showing, barely clinching a playoff spot with an eighth-place finish. The team again reached the finals, falling to the Tijuana Zonkeys in a six-game series.

In February 2019, Spaniard Pedro Carrillo was hired as head coach, having previously coached the Ángeles de Puebla in the LNBP. He also won a LNBP championship with Fuerza Regia de Monterrey in 2016–17 as an assistant. Although he was selected to coach the North squad at the 2019 CIBACOPA All-Star Game in Guadalajara, Carrillo left the team in June for personal reasons. In the postseason, the Halcones lost in the semi-finals to the Mantarrayas de La Paz in seven games. The Halcones lost game seven at home by a score of 105–92 despite 29 points from José Estrada.

American former top high school recruit Tony Farmer joined the team in 2020, as did Jarvis Summers and Reggie Holmes. The Halcones played two games of the 2020 season, losses to Rayos de Hermosillo and Ostioneros de Guaymas, before the league announced the season was suspended due to the COVID-19 pandemic.

Ahead of the 2022 season, the Halcones hired Ariel Rearte as head coach and announced they were moving their home arena from the Gimnasio Municipal Manuel Lira García to the Arena ITSON.

On December 31, 2024, the Halcones hired Dennis Cutts as head coach for the 2025 season. On March 21, 2025, the Halcones parted ways with Cutts.

On March 21, 2025, the Halcones announced Manu Gelpi as the team's new head coach for the remainder of the season.

== Players ==
=== Current roster ===
Note: Flags indicate national team eligibility at FIBA-sanctioned events. Players may hold other non-FIBA nationalities not displayed.

Halcones de Ciudad Obregón roster
Players
Coaches

| Pos. | No. | Nat. | Name | Ht. | Wt. |
|---|---|---|---|---|---|
| SF | 0 | (United States) | Gaines, Davonte | 2.00 m (6 ft 7 in) |
| PG | 3 | (United States) | Perkins, Josh | 1.91 m (6 ft 3 in) |
| PF | 4 | (United States) | Moss, Justin | 2.03 m (6 ft 8 in) |
| PG | 5 | (United States) | House, Jaden | 1.93 m (6 ft 4 in) |
| SG | 8 | (Mexico) | Duarte, Axel | 1.90 m (6 ft 3 in) |
| PG | 11 | (United States) | Josiah, Jahvari | 1.94 m (6 ft 4 in) |
| SG | 15 | (Mexico) | Pacheco, Rubén | 1.92 m (6 ft 4 in) |
| SG | 16 | (Mexico) | Delgado, Raúl | 1.88 m (6 ft 2 in) |
| C | 17 | (Mexico) | Reyna, Alejandro | 2.06 m (6 ft 9 in) |
| SG | 18 | (United States) | Hamilton, Isaac | 1.96 m (6 ft 5 in) |
| SF | 22 | (Mexico) | García, Raúl | 1.92 m (6 ft 4 in) |
| PF | 31 | (Mexico) | Beltrán, Alberto | 2.01 m (6 ft 7 in) |
| SG | 33 | (Mexico) | Martínez, Antonio | 1.88 m (6 ft 2 in) |
| SF | 55 | (United States) | Farmer, Tony | 1.98 m (6 ft 6 in) |
| SG | 77 | (United States) | Thomas, Cleveland | 1.93 m (6 ft 4 in) |

Head coach

- (Argentina) Manu Gelpi

Assistant coach(es)

- (Uruguay) Gervasio Heinzen
- (Mexico) Abelardo Burgueño

Legend

- (C) Team captain
- (I) Import player
- Injured

- Roster

== Head coaches ==
- (Argentina) Eduardo Opezzo (2017)
- (Venezuela) Ronald Guillen (2018)
- (Spain) Pedro Carrillo (2019)
- (Serbia) Martin Knezevic (2020, 2023–present)
- (Argentina) Ariel Rearte (2022)

== Honours ==
=== Domestic competitions ===
- Circuito de Baloncesto de la Costa del Pacífico
  - Winners (1): 2017
  - Runners-up (1): 2018

== Notable players ==
Note: Flags indicate national team eligibility at FIBA-sanctioned events. Players may hold other non-FIBA nationalities not displayed.

Criteria

To appear in this section a player must have either:

- Set a club record or won an individual award while at the club
- Played at least one official international match for their national team at any time
- Played at least one official NBA match at any time.

- (Mexico) Israel Gutiérrez
- (Mexico) Idris Ibn Idris
- (Mexico) Omar Quintero
- (Mexico) Alejandro Reyna
- (Puerto Rico) Timajh Parker-Rivera
- (United States) J. R. Giddens
- (United States) Glen Rice Jr.
- (United States) Greg Whittington
