= Frayles de Guasave =

- League: CIBACOPA
- Founded: 2001
- Arena: Arena Salsa Huichol
- Capacity: 1,500
- Location: Guasave, Sinaloa, Mexico
- Team colors: Yellow, white and black
- President: José Carlos Jusaviro
- Head coach: Arsalan Jamil
- Website: Official site
Home	Away

The Frayles de Guasave is a Mexican professional basketball club based in Guasave, Sinaloa. The Frayles are members of the Circuito de Baloncesto de la Costa del Pacífico (CIBACOPA). Their home games are played at the Arena Salsa Huichol.

In 2015, their youth team joined the Circuito de Basquetbol de Sinaloa (Cibasin), a local state league.

They played their last season in 2018 before the team moved to Guadalajara, becoming the Gigantes de Jalisco.

In September 2023, after a five-year hiatus, it was announced that the Frayles would return to the CIBACOPA for the 2024 season. Lucas Zurita was presented as the team's head coach in December.

== Notable players ==
Note: Flags indicate national team eligibility at FIBA-sanctioned events. Players may hold other non-FIBA nationalities not displayed.

Criteria

To appear in this section a player must have either:

- Set a club record or won an individual award while at the club
- Played at least one official international match for their national team at any time
- Played at least one official NBA match at any time.

- (Brazil) Larry Taylor
- (Mexico) Gabriel Girón
- (Mexico) David Meza
- (United States) Carldell Johnson

== Players ==
=== Current roster ===
Note: Flags indicate national team eligibility at FIBA-sanctioned events. Players may hold other non-FIBA nationalities not displayed.

Frayles de Guasave roster
Players
Coaches

Pos.	No.	Nat.	Name	Ht.
PG	0	(United States)	Phipps, Trey	1.88 m (6 ft 2 in)
PG	2	(United States)	Nelson, Sa'eed	1.88 m (6 ft 2 in)
SG	3	(United States)	Brito Jr., Octavio	1.93 m (6 ft 4 in)
SF	4	(United States)	Pal, Jay	2.05 m (6 ft 9 in)
PF	8	(Mexico)	Olea, Raúl	1.99 m (6 ft 6 in)
SG	9	(United States)	Jones, Jemerrio	1.96 m (6 ft 5 in)
SG	12	(United States)	McDavid, Noah	1.95 m (6 ft 5 in)
SG	18	(Mexico)	Tona, Austre	1.91 m (6 ft 3 in)
C	45	(United States)	Monyyong, Ruot	2.10 m (6 ft 11 in)
SG	55	(British Virgin Islands)	Hodge, D'Moi	1.91 m (6 ft 3 in)

Head coach

- (Canada) Arsalan Jamil

Assistant coach(es)

- (Mexico) Hugo Samuel Morales
- (Mexico) Francisco Morales

Legend

- (C) Team captain
- (I) Import player
- Injured
