= Venados de Mazatlán (basketball) =

- League: CIBACOPA
- Founded: 2018; 8 years ago
- Arena: Lobodome
- Capacity: 3,000
- Location: Mazatlán, Sinaloa, Mexico
- Team colors: Red, Purple, and White
- President: Paúl Luque Wiley
- Head coach: Eric Weissling
- Ownership: Espectáculos Costa del Pacífico, S.A. de C.V.
| Home | Away |

Venados de Mazatlán (English: Mazatlán Deers) are a Mexican professional basketball team based in Mazatlán, Sinaloa. The Venados de Mazatlán are members of the CIBACOPA and play their games in the Lobodome.

== History ==
The team was founded in 2018, after Espectáculos Costa del Pacífico acquired the CIBACOPA team Naúticos de Mazatlán, with Paúl Luque Wiley serving as team president. It was also announced that the Venados would be playing at the Lobodome.

Venados played its first official game on 30 March 2019, suffering an 96–78 defeat to the Caballeros de Culiacán. They achieved their first-ever victory the following day, beating the Ostioneros de Guaymas 76–74.

Venados hired American coach Derrick Allen as the team head coach in late April 2024.

== Players ==
=== Current roster ===
Note: Flags indicate national team eligibility at FIBA-sanctioned events. Players may hold other non-FIBA nationalities not displayed.

Venados de Mazatlán roster
Players
Coaches

| Pos. | No. | Nat. | Name | Ht. | Wt. |
|---|---|---|---|---|---|
| SG | 0 | (United States) | Johnson, Taylor | 1.93 m (6 ft 4 in) |
| PF | 2 | (United States) | White, Decensae | 1.98 m (6 ft 6 in) |
| PG | 3 | (Mexico) | Acosta, Francisco | 1.80 m (5 ft 11 in) |
| SG | 8 | (Mexico) | Hernández, Axel | 1.97 m (6 ft 6 in) |
| SF | 9 | (Mexico) | Casillas, Jorge | 1.93 m (6 ft 4 in) |
| PG | 10 | (Canada) | Bandoo, Devonté | 1.91 m (6 ft 3 in) |
| PG | 11 | (United States) | Ledbetter, Jeff | 1.91 m (6 ft 3 in) |
| PG | 13 | (United States) | Nelson, Anthony Sida | 1.92 m (6 ft 4 in) |
| SF | 15 | (Mexico) | González, Javier | 1.95 m (6 ft 5 in) |
| PF | 28 | (United States) | Smith, Khydarius | 2.03 m (6 ft 8 in) |
| C | 33 | (Mexico) | Castro, Alberto | 2.03 m (6 ft 8 in) |
| PF | 44 | (United States) | Quinn, Dakota | 2.06 m (6 ft 9 in) |

Head coach

- (United States) Eric Weissling

Assistant coach(es)

- (United States) Ben Bliss
- (United States) Erik Rashad
- (Cameroon) Gaston Essengue

Legend

- (C) Team captain
- (I) Import player
- Injured

- Roster
