= Rayos de Hermosillo =

- League: CIBACOPA
- Founded: 2009
- History: Rayos de Hermosillo (2009–present)
- Arena: Arena Sonora
- Capacity: 3,500
- Location: Hermosillo, Sonora, Mexico
- Team colors: Black, gold and white
- President: Miguel Ángel Figueroa Gallegos
- Head coach: Jaime Fuentes (interim)
- Championships: 4 (2012, 2013, 2019, 2024)
- Website: rayoshermosillo.com
Home	Away

Rayos de Hermosillo is a Mexican professional basketball club based in Hermosillo, Sonora. The Rayos play in the Circuito de Baloncesto de la Costa del Pacífico (CIBACOPA) and play their home games at the Arena Sonora.

They have won four league titles (2012, 2013, 2019, 2024).

== History ==
The Rayos de Hermosillo took the spot of the Vaqueros de Agua Prieta for the 2009 CIBACOPA season. The last team to play in the city, the Soles de Hermosillo, competed in CIBACOPA from 2003 to 2005.

The Rayos reached the CIBACOPA Finals in 2011, but were swept by the Mineros de Cananea.

Hermosillo won back-to-back titles after defeating the Ostioneros de Guaymas in 2012 and the Garra Cañera de Navolato in 2013, both in seven-game series.

In 2019, the Rayos faced the Mantarrayas de La Paz in the league finals. After going down 2 games to 3, Hermosillo defeated La Paz 99–59 in game six before taking game seven by a score of 90–77 to win their third league title in eight years. Terrence Drisdom and Jeremy Hollowell led the team in scoring with 22 and 19 points, respectively, with Hollowell being named Finals MVP.

The Rayos won their record-breaking fourth title in 2024 after sweeping the Astros de Jalisco in four games.

== Media ==
Rayos home games have been broadcast across the internet since 2010. In 2014, they reached a deal with Megacable to broadcast their home games on television, and they have since switched to Telemax.

== Notable players ==
Note: Flags indicate national team eligibility at FIBA-sanctioned events. Players may hold other non-FIBA nationalities not displayed.

Criteria

To appear in this section a player must have either:

- Set a club record or won an individual award while at the club
- Played at least one official international match for their national team at any time
- Played at least one official NBA match at any time.

- (Democratic Republic of the Congo) Myck Kabongo
- (Mexico) Edgar Garibay
- (Mexico) Diego Willis
- (United States) Jeff Ayres
- (United States) Jabari Bird
- (United States) Myke Henry
- (United States) Reggie Jordan
- (United States) Jeremy Hollowell
- (United States) Alfonzo McKinnie
- (United States) Craig Sword

== Players ==
=== Current roster ===
Note: Flags indicate national team eligibility at FIBA-sanctioned events. Players may hold other non-FIBA nationalities not displayed.

Rayos de Hermosillo roster
Players
Coaches

Pos.	No.	Nat.	Name	Ht.	Wt.
PG	2	(United States)	Sword, Craig	1.91 m (6 ft 3 in)
SG	3	(United States)	Felton, R. J.	1.90 m (6 ft 3 in)
PF	5	(United States)	Gaddy, Kiandre	1.96 m (6 ft 5 in)
PF	7	(Mexico)	Lizárraga, José	1.80 m (5 ft 11 in)
PG	9	(United States)	Gooden, Cameron	1.80 m (5 ft 11 in)
PG	10	(United States)	Carey, Donald	1.96 m (6 ft 5 in)
SG	11	(United States)	Henderson, Jordan	1.92 m (6 ft 4 in)
C	14	(Netherlands)	Bieshaar, Terrence	2.08 m (6 ft 10 in)
PG	16	(Mexico)	Mendoza, Eduardo	1.90 m (6 ft 3 in)
PF	33	(Mexico)	Martínez, Brayan	2.03 m (6 ft 8 in)
C	55	(United States)	Brown, Terrell	2.08 m (6 ft 10 in)
PF	58	(Mexico)	Domínguez, Rodrigo	2.03 m (6 ft 8 in)

Head coach

- (Mexico) Jaime Fuentes (interim)

Assistant coach(es)

- (Mexico) Jeovanni Lara

Legend

- (C) Team captain
- (I) Import player
- Injured

- Roster
