= Caballeros de Culiacán =

Professional basketball club

- Leagues: CIBACOPA
- Founded: 2001
- History: Caballeros de Culiacán (2001–present)
- Arena: Polideportivo Juan S. Millán
- Capacity: 1,800
- Location: Culiacán, Sinaloa, Mexico
- Team colors: Gold, white and black
- President: Saúl Saldaña
- Head coach: Mario Andriolo
- Championships: 2 (2001, 2010)
- Website: Official site
Home	Away

Caballeros de Culiacán (Culiacán Knights) is a professional basketball club based in Culiacán, Sinaloa, Mexico. The team currently plays in the Circuito de Baloncesto de la Costa del Pacífico (CIBACOPA). In the past the team played in the Liga Nacional de Baloncesto Profesional (LNBP).

== Notable players ==
Note: Flags indicate national team eligibility at FIBA-sanctioned events. Players may hold other non-FIBA nationalities not displayed.

Criteria

To appear in this section a player must have either:

- Set a club record or won an individual award while at the club
- Played at least one official international match for their national team at any time
- Played at least one official NBA match at any time.

- (Mexico) Víctor Ávila
- (Mexico) Israel Gutiérrez
- (Mexico) Horacio Llamas
- (Mexico) David Meza
- (Mexico) Adrián Zamora
- (Panama) Josimar Ayarza
- (United States) Jarron Cumberland
- (United States) Tim Quarterman
- (United States) Kenny Satterfield

== Logos ==
Former primary logo

== Players ==
=== Current roster ===
Note: Flags indicate national team eligibility at FIBA-sanctioned events. Players may hold other non-FIBA nationalities not displayed.

Caballeros de Culiacán roster
Players
Coaches

Pos.	No.	Nat.	Name	Ht.
SF	1	(United States)	Powell, Isaiah	1.98 m (6 ft 6 in)
PG	4	(United States)	Smith, Rashad	2.01 m (6 ft 7 in)
PG	5	(United States)	Peters, Roddy	1.91 m (6 ft 3 in)
PG	7	(Mexico)	Contreras, Juan	1.83 m (6 ft 0 in)
SF	8	(Mexico)	Ayala, Omar	1.94 m (6 ft 4 in)
C	9	(United States)	Jones, Torren	1.82 m (6 ft 0 in)
PG	9	(United States)	Alston, Brandon	1.96 m (6 ft 5 in)
SF	11	(United States)	Hughes III, Johnny	2.00 m (6 ft 7 in)
SF	12	(Mexico)	Morachis, Luis	1.95 m (6 ft 5 in)
SG	15	(United States)	Appiah, Nana	1.93 m (6 ft 4 in)
SF	22	(United States)	McCallum, Tre'Darius	2.03 m (6 ft 8 in)
C	33	(Mexico)	Martínez, Miguel	2.03 m (6 ft 8 in)
SG	55	(Mexico)	Ibarra, Dominique	1.90 m (6 ft 3 in)

Head coach

- (Uruguay) Mario Andriolo

Assistant coach(es)

- (Mexico) Froylan Verdugo
- (Argentina) Carlos Manuel Collatti

Legend

- (C) Team captain
- (I) Import player
- Injured
