= Liga Mexicana de Básquetbol CIBACOPA =

Mexican basketball league

Mexican Basketball League CIBACOPA
- Current season, competition or edition: 2026 CIBACOPA season
- Sport: Basketball
- Founded: 2001; 25 years ago
- President: Rogelio Sánchez de la Vega
- No. of teams: 11
- Country: Mexico
- Continent: FIBA Americas (Americas)
- Most recent champions: Astros de Jalisco (4th title) (2026)
- Most titles: Rayos de Hermosillo (4 titles); Astros de Jalisco (4 titles)
- Broadcasters: Mexico; ESPN; Mega Sports; TVC Deportes; United States; beIN Sports
- Website: www.CIBACOPA.org

The Mexican Basketball League CIBACOPA (Spanish: Liga Mexicana de Básquetbol CIBACOPA or CIBACOPA), officially known as the Liga Mexicana de Básquetbol Caliente CIBACOPA for sponsorship reasons, is an eleven team basketball league based in Northwestern Mexico. The matches take place from February to May.

== History ==
A league with the same name existed in the 1980s, and the second incarnation was founded in 2001. The charter members were Caballeros de Culiacán, Delfines de Mazatlán, Frayles de Guasave, Lobos Marinos de La Paz, Paisas de Los Cabos, and Pioneros de Los Mochis. Caballeros de Culiacán won the inaugural league title by defeating Delfines de Mazatlán four games to none in the finals.

The 2019 season saw a total attendance of more than 220,000.

The league celebrated its 20th season in 2020. A new franchise, Gallos de Aguascalientes, was set to join but were expelled before the season began.

== Teams ==
Locations of the 2026 CIBACOPA teams

Team	City	Arena	Capacity	Member Since	Head coach
Ángeles de la Ciudad de México	Benito Juárez, Mexico City	Gimnasio Olímpico Juan de la Barrera	5,242	2024	(Mexico) Enrique Zúñiga
Astros de Jalisco	Guadalajara, Jalisco	Arena Astros	4,000	2022	(Spain) Iván Déniz
Caballeros de Culiacán	Culiacán, Sinaloa	Polideportivo Juan S. Millán	1,800	2000	(Uruguay) Mario Andriolo
Frayles de Guasave	Guasave, Sinaloa	Arena Salsa Huichol	1,500	2001	(Canada) Arsalan Jamil
Halcones de Ciudad Obregón	Ciudad Obregón, Sonora	Arena ITSON	3,500	2016	(Argentina) Manu Gelpi
Ostioneros de Guaymas	Guaymas, Sonora	Gimnasio Municipal de Guaymas	1,200	2008	(United States) Walter McCarty
Pioneros de Los Mochis	Los Mochis, Sinaloa	Centro de Usos Múltiples de Los Mochis	5,830	2000	(Mexico) Jhovanny García
Rayos de Hermosillo	Hermosillo, Sonora	Arena Sonora	3,500	2008	(Mexico) Jaime Fuentes (interim)
Toros Laguna	Torreón, Coahuila	Auditorio Municipal de Torreón	4,363	2026	Vacant
Venados de Mazatlán	Mazatlán, Sinaloa	Lobodome	3,000	2014	(United States) Eric Weissling
Zonkeys de Tijuana	Tijuana, Baja California	Arena Zonkeys	3,000	2010	(Dominican Republic) Luis Flores

== List of champions ==
Year	Champion	Series	Runner-up
2001	Caballeros de Culiacán	4–0	Delfines de Mazatlán
2002	Trigueros de Ciudad Obregón	4–3	Caballeros de Culiacán
2003	Trigueros de Ciudad Obregón	4–1	Soles de Hermosillo
2004	Frayles de Guasave	4–2	Trigueros de Ciudad Obregón
2005	Fuerza Guinda de Nogales	4–2	Trigueros de Ciudad Obregón
2006	Frayles de Guasave	4–1	Mineros de Cananea
2007	Trigueros de Ciudad Obregón	4–2	Vaqueros de Agua Prieta
2008	Lobos UAD Mazatlán	4–3	Frayles de Guasave
2009	Mineros de Cananea	4–2	Caballeros de Culiacán
2010	Caballeros de Culiacán	4–0	Mineros de Cananea
2011	Mineros de Cananea	4–0	Rayos de Hermosillo
2012	Rayos de Hermosillo	4–3	Ostioneros de Guaymas
2013	Rayos de Hermosillo	4–3	Garra Cañera de Navolato
2014	Tijuana Zonkeys	4–3	Caballeros de Culiacán
2015	Tijuana Zonkeys	4–3	Fuerza Guinda de Nogales
2016	Náuticos de Mazatlán	4–2	Rayos de Hermosillo
2017	Halcones de Ciudad Obregón	4–2	Rayos de Hermosillo
2018	Tijuana Zonkeys	4–2	Halcones de Ciudad Obregón
2019	Rayos de Hermosillo	4–3	Mantarrayas de La Paz
2020	Abandoned due to the COVID-19 pandemic in Mexico		
2021	Abandoned due to the COVID-19 pandemic in Mexico		
2022	Astros de Jalisco	4–2	Rayos de Hermosillo
2023	Astros de Jalisco	4–2	Rayos de Hermosillo
2024	Rayos de Hermosillo	4–0	Astros de Jalisco
2025	Astros de Jalisco	4–3	Tijuana Zonkeys
2026	Astros de Jalisco	4–1	Frayles de Guasave

== Championships ==
Teams that are no longer active are marked in italics.

Team	Champion	Runner-up	Year(s) won
Rayos de Hermosillo	4	3	2012, 2013, 2019, 2024
Astros de Jalisco	4	1	2022, 2023, 2025, 2026
Trigueros de Ciudad Obregón	3	2	2002, 2003, 2007
Tijuana Zonkeys	3	1	2014, 2015, 2018
Caballeros de Culiacán	2	3	2001, 2010
Mineros de Cananea	2	2	2009, 2011
Frayles de Guasave	2	2	2004, 2006
Fuerza Guinda de Nogales	1	1	2005
Halcones de Ciudad Obregón	1	1	2017
Lobos UAD de Mazatlán	1	0	2008
Náuticos de Mazatlán	1	0	2016
Delfines de Mazatlán	0	1	
Soles de Hermosillo	0	1	
Vaqueros de Agua Prieta	0	1	
Ostioneros de Guaymas	0	1	
Garra Cañera de Navolato	0	1	
Mantarrayas de La Paz	0	1	

== Top-scorers ==
Year	Player	PPG	Team
2009	(United States) Letheal Cook	25.5	Mineros de Cananea
2010	(United States) Forrest Ray Fisher III	25.4	Bomberos de Mexicali
2011	(United States) Kevin Edward Sowell	30.8	Frayles de Guasave
2012	(United States) Devon Kobi Pearson	27.2	Pioneros de Los Mochis
2013	(United States) Kenny Jones	25.8	Trigueros de Ciudad Obregón
2014	(United States) Justin Lee Watts	23.1	Mineros de Caborca
2015	(United States) Durrell Summers	22.9	Rayos de Hermosillo
2016	(United States) Steven Pledger	24.4	Vaqueros de Agua Prieta
2017	(United States) Sammuel Yeager	25.28	Frayles de Guasave
2018	(United States) Sammuel Yeager	24.96	Frayles de Guasave
2019	(United States) Sammuel Yeager (3)	25.3	Frayles de Guasave
2020	Abandoned due to the COVID-19 pandemic in Mexico		
2021	Abandoned due to the COVID-19 pandemic in Mexico		
2022	(United States) Jordan Stevens	24.0	Pioneros de Los Mochis
2023	(United States) Jordan Stevens (2)	26.4	Pioneros de Los Mochis
2024	(United States) Tony Farmer	23.7	Halcones de Ciudad Obregón
2025	(United States) Terrell Brown Jr.	24.0	Ángeles de la Ciudad de México

=== Players with most awards ===
Player	Awards	Years
(United States) Sammuel Yeager	3	2017, 2018, 2019
(United States) Jordan Stevens	2	2022, 2023

== Former clubs ==
- Águilas Doradas de Durango (2017–2018)
- Calor de Mexicali (2007)
  - Bomberos de Mexicali (2010–2011)
- Cañeros Dorados de Navolato (2002–2006)
- Colorados de San Luis (2007)
- Coras de Tepic (2001–2002, 2009, 2012)
  - Coras de Nayarit (2009–2010)
  - Lagartos UAN Tepic (2011)
- Delfines de Mazatlán (2001–2003)
  - Tiburones de Mazatlán (2004–2007)
  - Lobos UAD Mazatlán (2007–2015)
  - Naúticos de Mazatlán (2015–2019)
- Fuerza Guinda de Nogales (2003–2016)
- Gallos de Aguascalientes (2020)
- Garra Cañera de Navolato (2012–2018)
- Gigantes de Jalisco (2018–2022)
- Halcones de Guamúchil (2001–??)
- Industriales de Mexicali
- Lobos Marinos de La Paz (2001, 2003–2004)
  - Mantarrayas de La Paz (2019–2022)
- Marineros de Guaymas (2005–2006)
  - Bucaneros de Guaymas (2007–2008)
- Mineros de Cananea (2006–2013)
  - Mineros de Caborca (2014–2015)
- Mochomos de Guamúchil
- Paisas de Cabo San Lucas (2001–2003)
- Paskolas de Navojoa (2004–2008)
- Pistones de Culiacán (2005)
- Soles de Hermosillo (2003–2004)
- Trigueros de Ciudad Obregón (2001–2013)
- Vaqueros de Agua Prieta (2007–2009, 2016)

== See also ==
- CIBACOPA All-Star Game
- CIMEBA
- LNB
