= 2027 FIBA Basketball World Cup qualification (Americas) =

International basketball competition

2027 FIBA Basketball World Cup
Americas Qualifiers

Tournament details
- Dates: 10 July 2024 – 28 February 2027
- Teams: 23

Official website
- Americas qualifiers website Americas pre-qualifiers website Central American pre-qualifiers website South American pre-qualifiers website

The 2027 FIBA Basketball World Cup qualification for the FIBA Americas region began in July 2024 and will conclude in March 2027. The process will determine the seven teams that will participate at the 2027 FIBA Basketball World Cup.

== Format ==
The qualification structure is as follows:

- Pre-Qualifiers
  - First round: Teams that did not enter the 2025 FIBA AmeriCup qualifiers were divided into three tournaments, based on geographical sub-zones. The best-placed team from Central American sub-zone, the 2 best-placed team from the Caribbean sub-zone and the single winner from South American play-off advance to the second round.
  - Second round: 4 teams that have eliminated for the 2025 FIBA AmeriCup will be joined by four teams advancing from the pre-qualifiers first round. Two teams advance from the sub-zone pre-qualifiers.
- Qualifiers: The 12 teams that have qualified for the 2025 FIBA AmeriCup will be joined by four teams advancing from the pre-qualifiers second round.
  - First round: The 16 teams will be divided into four groups of four teams to play home-and-away matches. The three best placed teams from each group advance to the second round.
  - Second round: The twelve teams will be divided into two groups of six teams. Each group is formed from teams advancing from the two first round groups. All results from the previous round will be carried over. The three best placed teams from both groups plus the fourth-placed team with better record qualify for the World Cup.

== Entrants ==
Teams entering the qualifiers	Teams entering the pre-qualifiers second round	Teams entering the pre-qualifiers first round		
Teams entering the qualifiers	Teams entering the pre-qualifiers second round	Caribbean	Central America	South America
Argentina; Bahamas; Brazil; Canada; Colombia; Dominican Republic; Nicaragua; Panama; Puerto Rico; United States; Uruguay; Venezuela	Chile; Cuba; Mexico; Paraguay	Barbados; Jamaica	Costa Rica; El Salvador; Guatemala; Honduras	Bolivia; Ecuador

== Schedule ==
Qualifiers	Round	Dates
Pre-qualifiers	First round	10–14 July 2024 (South American sub-zone); 18–21 July 2024 (Central American sub-zone)
Pre-qualifiers	Second round	8–10 August 2025
Qualifiers	First round	27 November 2025 – 8 July 2026
Qualifiers	Second round	26 August 2026 – 28 February 2027

== Pre-qualifiers ==
All times are local.

=== First round ===
==== South American sub-zone ====
The tournament was played in a home and away format. Two teams competed for one spot to the second round.

===== Overview =====
Team 1	Agg.	Team 2	1st leg	2nd leg
Bolivia	125–144	Ecuador	59–57	66–87

10 July 2024	Bolivia	59–57	Ecuador	Tarija
20:00	Scoring by quarter: 21–12, 11–16, 15–14, 12–15
	Pts: Pérez 13; Rebs: Ribera 9 Asts: Arze 3	Report	Pts: Cardenas 20; Rebs: Barahona 12; Asts: Barreras 3	Arena: Coliseo de Basquetbol Guadalquivir; Attendance: 2,200; Referees: Leonardo Zalazar (ARG), Claudio Osorio (CHI), Nicolas Zivieri (BRA)

14 July 2024	Ecuador	87–66 (144–125 agg.)	Bolivia	Pasaje
19:00	Scoring by quarter: 16–19, 21–16, 26–13, 24–18
	Pts: Cardenas 24; Rebs: Barahona, Cardenas 9 Asts: Barreras 5	Report	Pts: Calvo 20; Rebs: Arze 6 Asts: Arze 6	Arena: Coliseo César Fadul Dibb; Referees: Fernando Leite (BRA), Nicolás Flores (PAR), Franco Anselmo (ARG)

==== Central American sub-zone ====
The tournament was played in San Salvador, El Salvador. Four teams competed for one spot to the second round.

===== Preliminary round =====
Pos	Team	Pld	W	L	PF	PA	PD	Pts
1	Costa Rica	3	3	0	252	164	+88	6
2	El Salvador (H)	3	2	1	187	204	−17	5
3	Guatemala	3	1	2	201	226	−25	4
4	Honduras	3	0	3	194	240	−46	3

Source: FIBA
Rules for classification: 1) Points; 2) Head-to-head results; 3) Points difference; 4) Points scored.
(H) Hosts

17 July 2024	Costa Rica	81–76	Honduras	San Salvador, El Salvador
17:30	Scoring by quarter: 19–10, 24–22, 22–18, 16–26
	Pts: Dan. Shedden 19; Rebs: Arias 6 Asts: Conejo 8	Report	Pts: Cacho 15; Rebs: Bodden 11; Asts: Cacho, Guerrero 4	Arena: Gimnasio Nacional José Adolfo Pineda; Referees: Krishna Dominguez (MEX), Grant Todey (USA), Francisco De León (PUR)

17 July 2024	El Salvador	76–65	Guatemala	San Salvador
20:00	Scoring by quarter: 19–17, 7–18, 25–10, 25–20
	Pts: Mosley 29; Rebs: García 6 Asts: Mosley 6	Report	Pts: Ávila 28; Rebs: Camacho 18; Asts: Camacho, Esquivel 3	Arena: Gimnasio Nacional José Adolfo Pineda; Referees: Leonardo Zalazar (ARG), Alan dos Santos (BRA), Ryan Langdon (CAN)

18 July 2024	Guatemala	47–94	Costa Rica	San Salvador, El Salvador
17:30	Scoring by quarter: 13–20, 13–25, 13–20, 8–29
	Pts: Ávila 14; Rebs: Ávila 7 Asts: Oliva 3	Report	Pts: Dan. Shedden 12; Rebs: Conejo, McDonald 6 Asts: Conejo 7	Arena: Gimnasio Nacional José Adolfo Pineda; Referees: Alan dos Santos (BRA), Carmelo De La Rosa (PUR), Ryan Langdon (CAN)

18 July 2024	Honduras	62–70	El Salvador	San Salvador, El Salvador
20:00	Scoring by quarter: 13–23, 18–20, 18–11, 13–16
	Pts: Cacho 17; Rebs: Martínez 12; Asts: Guerrero 4	Report	Pts: Rodríguez 21; Rebs: García 8 Asts: García 5	Arena: Gimnasio Nacional José Adolfo Pineda; Referees: Grant Todey (USA), Samuel Hidalgo (DOM), Francisco De León (PUR)

19 July 2024	Honduras	56–89	Guatemala	San Salvador, El Salvador
17:30	Scoring by quarter: 16–20, 14–20, 18–27, 8–22
	Pts: Martínez 19; Rebs: Martínez 6 Asts: Cacho 4	Report	Pts: Ávila 22; Rebs: Ávila 10; Asts: M. González 5	Arena: Gimnasio Nacional José Adolfo Pineda; Referees: Krishna Domínguez (MEX), Alan dos Santos (BRA), Samuel Hidalgo (DOM)

19 July 2024	El Salvador	41–77	Costa Rica	San Salvador
20:00	Scoring by quarter: 15–20, 10–23, 7–14, 9–20
	Pts: Menjivar 8 Rebs: Valle 6 Asts: Valle 2	Report	Pts: Dan. Shedden 15; Rebs: Conejo 9 Asts: Conejo 5	Arena: Gimnasio Nacional José Adolfo Pineda; Referees: Leonardo Zalazar (ARG), Carmelo De La Rosa (PUR), Ryan Langdon (CAN)

===== Knockout stage =====
====== Bracket ======
Semi-finals
20 July
Costa Rica	67
Honduras	57
20 July
El Salvador	81
Guatemala	67

Final
21 July
Costa Rica	88
El Salvador	56
Third place
21 July
Honduras	58
Guatemala	46

====== Semifinals ======
20 July 2024	Costa Rica	67–57	Honduras	San Salvador, El Salvador
17:30	Scoring by quarter: 17–11, 25–17, 10–13, 15–16
	Pts: Conejo 15; Rebs: three players 5 Asts: Conejo 6	Report	Pts: Cacho 12; Rebs: Martínez 10; Asts: Brooks 4	Arena: Gimnasio Nacional José Adolfo Pineda; Referees: Grant Todey (USA), Samuel Hidalgo (DOM), Ryan Langdon (CAN)

20 July 2024	El Salvador	81–67	Guatemala	San Salvador
20:00	Scoring by quarter: 23–20, 26–17, 15–17, 17–13
	Pts: Mosley 18; Rebs: García 10; Asts: Hernández 5	Report	Pts: Esquivel 17; Rebs: Catalán 8 Asts: Esquivel 4	Arena: Gimnasio Nacional José Adolfo Pineda; Referees: Alan dos Santos (BRA), Carmelo De La Rosa (PUR), Francisco De León (PUR)

====== Third place game ======
21 July 2024	Honduras	58–46	Guatemala	San Salvador, El Salvador
17:30	Scoring by quarter: 16–14, 17–11, 9–13, 16–8
	Pts: Cacho 16; Rebs: Cacho 13; Asts: Alfaro 3	Report	Pts: Ávila 20; Rebs: Esquivel 14; Asts: Ávila, M. González 3	Arena: Gimnasio Nacional José Adolfo Pineda; Referees: Samuel Hidalgo (DOM), Ryan Langdon (CAN), Krishna Domínguez (MEX)

====== Final ======
21 July 2024	Costa Rica	88–56	El Salvador	San Salvador, El Salvador
20:00	Scoring by quarter: 21–18, 27–18, 24–8, 16–12
	Pts: McDonald 16; Rebs: Dav. Shedden 7 Asts: Conejo 10	Report	Pts: Mosley 16; Rebs: García 12; Asts: Mosley 2	Arena: Gimnasio Nacional José Adolfo Pineda; Referees: Leonardo Zalazar (ARG), Grant Todey (USA), Carmelo De La Rosa (PUR)

=== Second round ===
The eight participating teams were divided into two groups. Four teams eliminated from the 2025 FIBA AmeriCup qualification and four teams qualified from the sub-zone pre-qualifiers (the winner of Central American sub-zone, the winner of South America sub-zone and the 2 best teams for the Caribbean sub-zone). Each team played against the rest of the teams in its group (total of three games per team). The best two teams in each of the groups automatically qualified for the Qualifiers. The groups were played in August 2025.

Entrance/qualification method	Team(s)
Eliminated from the 2025 FIBA AmeriCup qualification	Chile; ~~Paraguay~~; Cuba; Mexico
Qualified from the sub-zone pre-qualifiers	Costa Rica; Ecuador; Barbados; Jamaica; El Salvador

- Paraguay did not participate and was replaced by El Salvador (second place from the Central American sub-zone).

==== Group A ====
Pos	Team	Pld	W	L	PF	PA	PD	Pts	Qualification
1	Mexico (H)	3	3	0	280	205	+75	6	Qualifiers
2	Jamaica	3	2	1	242	245	−3	5	Qualifiers
3	Barbados	3	1	2	240	270	−30	4	
4	Costa Rica	3	0	3	198	240	−42	3	

Source: FIBA
Rules for classification: 1) Points; 2) Head-to-head results; 3) Points difference; 4) Points scored.
(H) Hosts

All times are local (UTC−7).

8 August 2025	Barbados	79–101	Jamaica	Ciudad Obregón, Mexico
16:00	Scoring by quarter: 21–24, 22–30, 24–24, 12–23
	Pts: Alexander 28; Rebs: Alexander, Thorpe 9 Asts: Hurley 6	Report	Pts: Thomas 20; Rebs: Abson, Gill 11; Asts: Foster, Reiley 6	Arena: Arena ITSON; Attendance: 528; Referees: Daniel García (VEN), Nicolas Zivieri (BRA), Cooper Toppings (CAN)

8 August 2025	Mexico	77–66	Costa Rica	Ciudad Obregón
20:00	Scoring by quarter: 22–14, 25–22, 16–18, 14–12
	Pts: Girón 15; Rebs: Bonilla, Gutiérrez 9 Asts: Cruz 9	Report	Pts: Martínez 13; Rebs: Arias 7 Asts: Alvarado 6	Arena: Arena ITSON; Attendance: 2,242; Referees: Roberto Vázquez (PUR), Fernando Leite (BRA), Julirys Guzmán (PUR)

9 August 2025	Costa Rica	76–80(OT)	Jamaica	Ciudad Obregón, Mexico
16:00	Scoring by quarter: 22–23, 15–19, 21–18, 13–11, Overtime: 5–9
	Pts: Arias 19; Rebs: Arias 10; Asts: Conejo 6	Report	Pts: Powell 34; Rebs: Gill 18; Asts: six players 2	Arena: Arena ITSON; Attendance: 474; Referees: Fernando Leite (BRA), Julirys Guzmán (PUR), Cooper Toppings (CAN)

9 August 2025	Mexico	113–78	Barbados	Ciudad Obregón
20:00	Scoring by quarter: 25–24, 33–22, 32–16, 23–16
	Pts: Bonilla 22; Rebs: Bonilla 7 Asts: Cruz 8	Report	Pts: Thorpe 16; Rebs: Thorpe 7 Asts: Alexander, Hurley 3	Arena: Arena ITSON; Attendance: 1,718; Referees: Orlando Varela (HON), Nicolas Zivieri (BRA), Carlos Pallares (COL)

10 August 2025	Barbados	83–56	Costa Rica	Ciudad Obregón, Mexico
15:00	Scoring by quarter: 16–8, 25–23, 25–12, 17–13
	Pts: Alexander 35; Rebs: Alexander 16; Asts: Hurley 6	Report	Pts: McDonald 13; Rebs: Arias 9 Asts: Conejo 5	Arena: Arena ITSON; Attendance: 518; Referees: Carlos Pallares (COL), Daniel García (VEN), Julirys Guzmán (PUR)

10 August 2025	Jamaica	61–90	Mexico	Ciudad Obregón, Mexico
19:00	Scoring by quarter: 8–24, 27–19, 12–23, 14–24
	Pts: Thomas 11; Rebs: Facey 7 Asts: Foster 6	Report	Pts: Cruz 21; Rebs: Gutiérrez 12; Asts: Stoll 8	Arena: Arena ITSON; Attendance: 3,107; Referees: Orlando Varela (HON), Nicolas Zivieri (BRA), Cooper Toppings (CAN)

==== Group B ====
Pos	Team	Pld	W	L	PF	PA	PD	Pts	Qualification
1	Chile (H)	3	3	0	277	180	+97	6	Qualifiers
2	Cuba	3	2	1	236	210	+26	5	Qualifiers
3	El Salvador	3	1	2	206	270	−64	4	
4	Ecuador	3	0	3	217	276	−59	3	

Source: FIBA
Rules for classification: 1) Points; 2) Head-to-head results; 3) Points difference; 4) Points scored.
(H) Hosts

All times are local (UTC−4).

8 August 2025	Cuba	83–63	El Salvador	Valdivia, Chile
17:30	Scoring by quarter: 23–16, 22–22, 21–14, 17–11
	Pts: Bombino, Rivero 16; Rebs: Bombino 10; Asts: Casero, Chacón 5	Report	Pts: García 22; Rebs: García 11; Asts: Rodríguez 5	Arena: Coliseo Municipal Antonio Azurmendy Riveros; Attendance: 2,500; Referees: Juan Fernández (ARG), Carlos Vélez (COL), Aline García (URU)

8 August 2025	Chile	101–59	Ecuador	Valdivia
20:00	Scoring by quarter: 19–19, 26–11, 26–13, 30–16
	Pts: Carrasco 15; Rebs: Carvacho 8 Asts: Carrasco 7	Report	Pts: Castillo 20; Rebs: A. Barahona, Castillo 7 Asts: Riascos 4	Arena: Coliseo Municipal Antonio Azurmendy Riveros; Attendance: 3,800; Referees: Andrés Bartel (URU), Alan dos Santos (BRA), Ryan Langdon (CAN)

9 August 2025	El Salvador	47–98	Chile	Valdivia, Chile
19:00	Scoring by quarter: 6–23, 8–24, 17–26, 16–25
	Pts: García 14; Rebs: Mosley 6 Asts: Hernández 5	Report	Pts: Carvacho 15; Rebs: Carvacho 9 Asts: three players 4	Arena: Coliseo Municipal Antonio Azurmendy Riveros; Attendance: 3,800; Referees: Carlos Vélez (COL), Carmelo De La Rosa (PUR), César Gonçalves (BRA)

9 August 2025	Ecuador	69–79	Cuba	Valdivia, Chile
21:30	Scoring by quarter: 18–17, 19–13, 17–27, 15–22
	Pts: Cárdenas 18; Rebs: Cárdenas 13; Asts: Guerra 4	Report	Pts: Rivero 29; Rebs: García 7 Asts: García, Rivero 4	Arena: Coliseo Municipal Antonio Azurmendy Riveros; Attendance: 2,500; Referees: Alan dos Santos (BRA), Ryan Langdon (CAN), Aline García (URU)

10 August 2025	Chile	78–74	Cuba	Valdivia
19:00	Scoring by quarter: 12–21, 21–10, 25–20, 20–23
	Pts: Haase 21; Rebs: Carvacho 5 Asts: Carrasco 7	Report	Pts: Rivero 25; Rebs: Bombino 12; Asts: Casero 3	Arena: Coliseo Municipal Antonio Azurmendy Riveros; Referees: Andrés Bartel (URU), Carlos Vélez (COL), César Gonçalves (BRA)

10 August 2025	El Salvador	96–89	Ecuador	Valdivia, Chile
21:30	Scoring by quarter: 31–20, 20–25, 25–24, 20–20
	Pts: García 29; Rebs: García 15; Asts: Mosley 7	Report	Pts: Arcila 20; Rebs: A. Barahona, Castillo 7 Asts: Mecias 4	Arena: Coliseo Municipal Antonio Azurmendy Riveros; Attendance: 1,000; Referees: Carmelo De La Rosa (PUR), Ryan Langdon (CAN), Aline García (URU)

== Qualifiers ==
=== Draw ===
The draw was held on 13 May 2025.

=== Seeding ===
The seeding was announced on 9 May 2025.

Pot 1
Team	Pos
United States	1
Canada	6

Pot 5
Team	Pos
Mexico	26
Bahamas	52

Pot 2
Team	Pos
Argentina	8
Brazil	12

Pot 6
Team	Pos
Colombia	55
Panama	57

Pot 3
Team	Pos
Puerto Rico	15
Dominican Republic	18

Pot 7
Team	Pos
Nicaragua	80
Jamaica	109

Pot 4
Team	Pos
Venezuela	25
Uruguay	51

Pot 8
Team	Pos
Chile	61
Cuba	68

=== First round ===
All times are local.

==== Group A ====
Pos	Team	Pld	W	L	PF	PA	PD	Pts	Qualification
1	United States	6	5	1	603	509	+94	11	Second round
2	Dominican Republic	6	4	2	533	472	+61	10	Second round
3	Mexico	6	3	3	552	548	+4	9	Second round
4	Nicaragua	6	0	6	448	607	−159	6	

Source: FIBA
Rules for classification: 1) Points; 2) Head-to-head results; 3) Points difference; 4) Points scored.

28 November 2025	Nicaragua	67–102	United States	Managua
19:10	Scoring by quarter: 20–31, 18–28, 16–16, 13–27
	Pts: Omier 26; Rebs: Omier 14; Asts: Ruiz 7	Report	Pts: Beauchamp 24; Rebs: Bradshaw 6 Asts: Knight 5	Arena: Polideportivo Alexis Argüello; Attendance: 6,000; Referees: Waseem Husainy (CAN), Fernando Leite (BRA), Cooper Toppings (CAN)

28 November 2025	Mexico	85–92	Dominican Republic	Zacatecas
20:40	Scoring by quarter: 23–17, 20–25, 15–26, 27–24
	Pts: Cruz 29; Rebs: Bonilla 10; Asts: Cruz 7	Report	Pts: Feliz 21; Rebs: Duarte 8 Asts: Duarte 4	Arena: Gimnasio Marcelino González; Attendance: 3,527; Referees: Andrés Bartel (URU), Daniel García (VEN), Diego Chiconato (BRA)

1 December 2025	United States	123–93	Nicaragua	College Park
19:10	Scoring by quarter: 26–25, 34–21, 31–24, 32–23
	Pts: Beauchamp 26; Rebs: four players 4 Asts: Knight 12	Report	Pts: Ruiz 36; Rebs: Omier 20; Asts: Ruiz 6	Arena: Gateway Center Arena; Attendance: 641; Referees: Juan Fernández (ARG), Nathaniel Saunders (CAN), Diego Chiconato (BRA)

1 December 2025	Dominican Republic	88–89	Mexico	Santo Domingo
20:10	Scoring by quarter: 28–24, 26–23, 9–20, 25–22
	Pts: Feliz 22; Rebs: Feliz 9 Asts: Montero 8	Report	Pts: Bonilla 20; Rebs: Bonilla 10; Asts: Cruz, Stoll 4	Arena: Pabellón Ricardo Gioriver Arias; Attendance: 3,700; Referees: Julio Anaya (PAN), Waseem Husainy (CAN), Orlando Varela (HON)

26 February 2026	Nicaragua	72–99	Mexico	Managua
19:10	Scoring by quarter: 21–22, 10–27, 16–21, 25–29
	Pts: Ruiz 26; Rebs: Pérez 10; Asts: Ruiz 5	Report	Pts: Cruz, Girón 16; Rebs: Girón 11; Asts: Cruz 7	Arena: Polideportivo Alexis Argüello; Referees: Alan dos Santos (BRA), Roberto Fernández (CRC), Nicolas Zivieri (BRA)

26 February 2026	United States	79–87	Dominican Republic	Oceanside
19:10	Scoring by quarter: 11–21, 22–18, 20–31, 26–17
	Pts: Knight 20; Rebs: Robinson, Wiseman 6 Asts: Payton 6	Report	Pts: Pérez 20; Rebs: Pérez 10; Asts: Solano 9	Arena: Frontwave Arena; Attendance: 1,064; Referees: Andrés Bartel (URU), Fernando Leite (BRA), Ryan Langdon (CAN)

1 March 2026	United States	123–88	Mexico	Oceanside
16:10	Scoring by quarter: 40–14, 31–18, 17–35, 35–21
	Pts: Roddy 20; Rebs: Taylor 10; Asts: Payton 9	Report	Pts: Stoll 25; Rebs: Avila, Gutiérrez 5 Asts: Cruz 6	Arena: Frontwave Arena; Attendance: 3,367; Referees: Julio Anaya (PAN), Carlos Pallares (COL), César Gonçalves (BRA)

1 March 2026	Nicaragua	61–86	Dominican Republic	Managua
19:30	Scoring by quarter: 18–14, 18–30, 13–23, 12–19
	Pts: Ewing 21; Rebs: Ewing 8 Asts: Ruiz 3	Report	Pts: Soriano 17; Rebs: Soriano 9 Asts: Pérez 7	Arena: Polideportivo Alexis Argüello; Attendance: 3,500; Referees: Juan Fernández (ARG), Danilo Molina (ARG), Carlos Pallares (COL)

3 July 2026	Dominican Republic	81–82	United States	Santo Domingo
20:00	Scoring by quarter: 24–15, 22–25, 12–20, 23–22
	Pts: Feliz 24; Rebs: Soriano 8 Asts: Feliz, Montero 6	Report	Pts: James 15; Rebs: Craig 9 Asts: James 13	Arena: Arena BanReservas; Attendance: 6,500; Referees: Juan Fernández (ARG), Roberto Fernández (CRC), Cooper Toppings (CAN)

3 July 2026	Mexico	98–79	Nicaragua	Zacatecas
20:30	Scoring by quarter: 22–22, 27–19, 25–17, 24–21
	Pts: Bonilla 25; Rebs: Avila 13; Asts: Cruz 7	Report	Pts: Ruiz 19; Rebs: Ruiz 8 Asts: Peralta 4	Arena: Gimnasio Marcelino González; Attendance: 3,200; Referees: Daniel García (VEN), César Gonçalves (BRA), Larissa Rodrigues (BRA)

6 July 2026	Dominican Republic	99–76	Nicaragua	Santo Domingo
20:00	Scoring by quarter: 21–15, 22–23, 34–19, 22–19
	Pts: Luis 22; Rebs: Luis 17; Asts: Feliz 10	Report	Pts: Ruiz 21; Rebs: Myers 16; Asts: Ruiz 6	Arena: Arena BanReservas; Attendance: 4,500; Referees: Carlos Vélez (COL), Jayson Stiell (CAN), Iván Huck (ARG)

6 July 2026	Mexico	93–94	United States	Zacatecas
20:00	Scoring by quarter: 27–22, 17–33, 23–16, 26–23
	Pts: Cruz 30; Rebs: Bonilla 17; Asts: Girón 6	Report	Pts: Craig 23; Rebs: James, Uthoff 7 Asts: James 7	Arena: Gimnasio Marcelino González; Attendance: 3,200; Referees: Andrés Bartel (URU), Danilo Molina (ARG), Carlos Pallares (COL)

==== Group B ====
Pos	Team	Pld	W	L	PF	PA	PD	Pts	Qualification
1	Canada	6	6	0	624	491	+133	12	Second round
2	Bahamas	6	2	4	543	561	−18	8 (Note: Bahamas 6 Pts, +24 PD; Puerto Rico 6 Pts, +21 PD; Jamaica 6 Pts, −45 PD)	Second round
3	Puerto Rico	6	2	4	537	553	−16	8	Second round
4	Jamaica	6	2	4	518	617	−99	8	

Source: FIBA
Rules for classification: 1) Points; 2) Head-to-head results; 3) Points difference; 4) Points scored.
Notes:

28 November 2025	Jamaica	92–90	Puerto Rico	San Juan, Puerto Rico
19:10	Scoring by quarter: 26–26, 26–31, 24–11, 16–22
	Pts: Cockburn 26; Rebs: Cockburn 15; Asts: Thelwell 8	Report	Pts: Ortiz 17; Rebs: Negron 10; Asts: Morales, Zeigler 3	Arena: Roberto Clemente Coliseum; Referees: Juan Fernández (ARG), Alan dos Santos (BRA), Yezid Carreño (COL)

28 November 2025	Bahamas	75–111	Canada	Nassau
20:40	Scoring by quarter: 24–34, 14–24, 17–28, 20–25
	Pts: Bridgewater 15; Rebs: Jones 8 Asts: Bridgewater 12	Report	Pts: Wiltjer 22; Rebs: three players 6 Asts: Bell-Haynes 7	Arena: Kendal Isaacs Gymnasium; Attendance: 200; Referees: Julio Anaya (PAN), Carlos Vélez (COL), Orlando Varela (HON)

1 December 2025	Canada	94–88	Bahamas	Toronto
19:10	Scoring by quarter: 23–11, 29–25, 23–26, 19–26
	Pts: Bell-Haynes 17; Rebs: Kennedy 6 Asts: Bell-Haynes 10	Report	Pts: Clarke 20; Rebs: Burrows 7 Asts: Clarke 13	Arena: Mattamy Athletic Centre; Referees: Omar Bermúdez (MEX), Andrés Bartel (URU), Alan dos Santos (BRA)

1 December 2025	Puerto Rico	92–97	Jamaica	San Juan
20:10	Scoring by quarter: 19–27, 22–27, 26–20, 25–23
	Pts: Thompson 18; Rebs: Toro 9 Asts: Zeigler 6	Report	Pts: Audige 20; Rebs: Cockburn 12; Asts: Audige, Cockburn 5	Arena: Roberto Clemente Coliseum; Referees: Carlos Vélez (COL), Fernando Leite (BRA), Franco Anselmo (ARG)

26 February 2026	Jamaica	96–99	Bahamas	Kingston
18:10	Scoring by quarter: 28–26, 27–27, 26–24, 15–22
	Pts: Audige 27; Rebs: Cockburn 12; Asts: Thelwell 6	Report	Pts: F. Miller 32; Rebs: Davis, Mobley 9 Asts: Clarke 9	Arena: National Indoor Sports Centre; Referees: Daniel García (VEN), Carlos Vélez (COL), Franco Anselmo (ARG)

26 February 2026	Puerto Rico	85–96(OT)	Canada	San Juan
20:10	Scoring by quarter: 23–13, 12–23, 22–23, 25–23, Overtime: 3–14
	Pts: Plummer 22; Rebs: Piñeiro 9 Asts: Piñeiro, Zeigler 5	Report	Pts: Carr 35; Rebs: Bediako 7 Asts: Carr 9	Arena: Roberto Clemente Coliseum; Referees: Julio Anaya (PAN), Juan Fernández (ARG), Orlando Varela (HON)

1 March 2026	Puerto Rico	71–66	Bahamas	San Juan
18:00	Scoring by quarter: 22–11, 17–19, 19–14, 13–22
	Pts: Romero 20; Rebs: Romero 10; Asts: Zeigler 9	Report	Pts: Jones, F. Miller 19; Rebs: Jones 9 Asts: F. Miller 7	Arena: Roberto Clemente Coliseum; Attendance: 3,800; Referees: Andrés Bartel (URU), Alan dos Santos (BRA), Nicolás Flores (PAR)

1 March 2026	Jamaica	81–97	Canada	Kingston
18:00	Scoring by quarter: 19–27, 17–22, 22–29, 23–19
	Pts: De Lattibeaudiere 23; Rebs: De Lattibeaudiere 11; Asts: Thelwell 5	Report	Pts: Carr 17; Rebs: Bediako 9 Asts: Carr 7	Arena: National Indoor Sports Centre; Attendance: 3,937; Referees: Daniel García (VEN), Roberto Fernández (CRC), Fernando Leite (BRA)

3 July 2026	Canada	110–84	Puerto Rico	Hamilton
19:10	Scoring by quarter: 31–16, 25–22, 27–22, 27–24
	Pts: Gilgeous-Alexander 26; Rebs: three players 5 Asts: Alexander-Walker 7	Report	Pts: Romero 17; Rebs: Freeman 9 Asts: three players 4	Arena: TD Coliseum; Attendance: 9,826; Referees: Omar Bermúdez (MEX), Carlos Vélez (COL), Samuel Hidalgo (DOM)

3 July 2026	Bahamas	123–74	Jamaica	Nassau
20:00	Scoring by quarter: 28–18, 33–14, 29–16, 33–26
	Pts: Edgecombe 26; Rebs: Edgecombe 8 Asts: Bridgewater 6	Report	Pts: Thelwell 24; Rebs: Audige 6 Asts: Audige, Thelwell 3	Arena: Kendal Isaacs Gymnasium; Attendance: 200; Referees: Andrés Bartel (URU), Franco Anselmo (ARG), Nicolás Flores (PAR)

6 July 2026	Canada	116–78	Jamaica	Hamilton
19:10	Scoring by quarter: 32–15, 25–25, 32–15, 27–23
	Pts: Brooks 20; Rebs: Wiltjer 5 Asts: Gilgeous-Alexander, R. Nembhard 5	Report	Pts: Thelwell 25; Rebs: Thompson 8 Asts: Bailey, Thelwell 3	Arena: TD Coliseum; Attendance: 10,441; Referees: Juan Fernández (ARG), Diego Chiconato (BRA), César Gonçalves (BRA)

6 July 2026	Bahamas	92–115	Puerto Rico	Nassau
19:10	Scoring by quarter: 23–34, 24–23, 20–28, 25–30
	Pts: Miller 24; Rebs: Albury 8 Asts: Miller 8	Report	Pts: De Jesús 22; Rebs: Freeman 10; Asts: De Jesús 5	Arena: Kendal Isaacs Gymnasium; Referees: Daniel García (VEN), Krishna Domínguez (MEX), Roberto Fernández (CRC)

==== Group C ====
Pos	Team	Pld	W	L	PF	PA	PD	Pts	Qualification
1	Brazil	6	6	0	562	452	+110	12	Second round
2	Colombia	6	3	3	499	528	−29	9	Second round
3	Chile	6	2	4	433	463	−30	8	Second round
4	Venezuela	6	1	5	474	525	−51	7	

Source: FIBA
Rules for classification: 1) Points; 2) Head-to-head results; 3) Points difference; 4) Points scored.

27 November 2025	Chile	66–82	Brazil	Valdivia
20:10	Scoring by quarter: 10–17, 24–21, 18–25, 14–19
	Pts: Haase 17; Rebs: Haase 10; Asts: Varela 5	Report	Pts: De Paula, Dias 16; Rebs: Meindl 9 Asts: Borges 5	Arena: Coliseo Municipal Antonio Azurmendy Riveros; Attendance: 3,573; Referees: Johnny Batista (PUR), Nicolás Flores (PAR), Edwin Quiles (PUR)

27 November 2025	Colombia	80–78	Venezuela	Cali
20:40	Scoring by quarter: 22–27, 23–21, 21–17, 14–13
	Pts: Echenique 17; Rebs: Angola 10; Asts: Atencia 8	Report	Pts: Graterol 17; Rebs: Sifontes 7 Asts: Guerra 5	Arena: Coliseo Evangelista Mora; Attendance: 300; Referees: Omar Bermúdez (MEX), Carmelo de la Rosa (PUR), Samuel Hidalgo (DOM)

30 November 2025	Brazil	78–62	Chile	São Paulo
19:10	Scoring by quarter: 25–16, 22–9, 14–26, 17–11
	Pts: Borges 18; Rebs: Meindl 8 Asts: De Paula 3	Report	Pts: Haase 15; Rebs: Haase 8 Asts: Varela 8	Arena: Ginásio Poliesportivo Wlamir Marques; Attendance: 2,844; Referees: Roberto Fernández (CRC), Carmelo de la Rosa (PUR), Samuel Hidalgo (DOM)

27 February 2026	Brazil	94–84	Venezuela	Belo Horizonte
19:00	Scoring by quarter: 28–17, 25–21, 19–19, 22–27
	Pts: Meindl 25; Rebs: Deodato, De Paula 6 Asts: Luz 11	Report	Pts: Mijares 20; Rebs: Materán 8 Asts: Mijares, Tovar 3	Arena: Arena UniBH; Attendance: 2,658; Referees: Omar Bermúdez (MEX), Waseem Husainy (CAN), Jayson Stiell (CAN)

27 February 2026	Chile	78–86	Colombia	Valdivia
20:00	Scoring by quarter: 12–28, 26–15, 16–21, 24–22
	Pts: Haase 16; Rebs: Haase 9 Asts: Varela 7	Report	Pts: Atencia 19; Rebs: Echenique 10; Asts: Roque 4	Arena: Coliseo Municipal Antonio Azurmendy Riveros; Attendance: 3,195; Referees: Julirys Guzmán (PUR), Krishna Domínguez (MEX), Samuel Hidalgo (DOM)

2 March 2026	Brazil	101–72	Colombia	Belo Horizonte
19:00	Scoring by quarter: 23–13, 32–24, 21–8, 25–27
	Pts: Pacheco 17; Rebs: Luz, Santos 6 Asts: Pacheco 11	Report	Pts: Echenique 14; Rebs: Roque 4 Asts: Roque 9	Arena: Arena UniBH; Attendance: 2,278; Referees: Jesed Díaz (PUR), Orlando Varela (HON), Carmelo de la Rosa (PUR)

2 March 2026	Chile	68–72	Venezuela	Valdivia
20:00	Scoring by quarter: 11–12, 14–29, 21–23, 22–8
	Pts: Suárez 21; Rebs: Carrión, Haase 6 Asts: Varela 9	Report	Pts: Guerra 16; Rebs: Centeno 8 Asts: Cifontes 3	Arena: Coliseo Municipal Antonio Azurmendy Riveros; Attendance: 2,662; Referees: Johnny Batista (PUR), Grant Todey (USA), Cooper Toppings (CAN)

3 July 2026	Colombia	79–81	Chile	Cali
18:30	Scoring by quarter: 15–19, 22–18, 23–21, 19–23
	Pts: Angola 18; Rebs: Tello 10; Asts: Angola 3	Report	Pts: Herrera 16; Rebs: Haase 15; Asts: Carrasco 4	Arena: Coliseo Evangelista Mora; Attendance: 1,100; Referees: Jesed Díaz (PUR), Grant Todey (USA), Teresa Stuck (USA)

4 July 2026 (Note: The June–July 2026 window games involving Venezuela were relocated to Colombia due to the 24 June 2026 earthquakes in Venezuela.)	Venezuela	88–103	Brazil	Cali, Colombia
19:10	Scoring by quarter: 24–29, 15–17, 23–23, 26–34
	Pts: Sifontes 22; Rebs: Fulda 7 Asts: Mijares 5	Report	Pts: Caboclo 22; Rebs: Dos Santos 6 Asts: Dos Santos 13	Arena: Coliseo Evangelista Mora; Attendance: 186; Referees: Roberto Vázquez (PUR), Johnny Batista (PUR), Jesed Díaz (PUR)

6 July 2026	Venezuela	66–78	Chile	Cali, Colombia
16:10	Scoring by quarter: 14–22, 17–22, 18–13, 17–21
	Pts: Guerra, Sifontes 15; Rebs: Centeno 8 Asts: González 5	Report	Pts: Haase 14; Rebs: Haase 9 Asts: Morales 4	Arena: Coliseo Evangelista Mora; Attendance: 120; Referees: Omar Bermúdez (MEX), Franco Anselmo (ARG), Samuel Hidalgo (DOM)

6 July 2026	Colombia	80–104	Brazil	Cali
19:10	Scoring by quarter: 21–33, 18–35, 21–15, 20–21
	Pts: Angola, Atencia 14; Rebs: Echenique 6 Asts: Angola, Tello 3	Report	Pts: Dos Santos 26; Rebs: Caboclo 7 Asts: Pacheco 9	Arena: Coliseo Evangelista Mora; Attendance: 1,421; Referees: Roberto Vázquez (PUR), Johnny Batista (PUR), Juan Valenzuela (MEX)

8 July 2026 (Note: The Venezuela v Colombia game, originally scheduled for 30 November 2025, 18:10 local time, was postponed due to the geopolitical situation in the region. The game was rescheduled for 30 June 2026, 19:10 local time, but it was postponed again due to the 24 June earthquakes in Venezuela.)	Venezuela	86–102	Colombia	Cali, Colombia
19:10	Scoring by quarter: 25–21, 24–27, 20–32, 17–22
	Pts: Sifontes 20; Rebs: Centeno 7 Asts: Mijares, Sifontes 4	Report	Pts: Atencia 22; Rebs: Tello 9 Asts: Angola, Atencia 5	Arena: Coliseo Evangelista Mora; Attendance: 100; Referees: Andrés Bartel (URU), Alexis Mercado (PUR), Danilo Molina (ARG)

==== Group D ====
Pos	Team	Pld	W	L	PF	PA	PD	Pts	Qualification
1	Uruguay	6	5	1	501	409	+92	11 (Note: Uruguay 137–135 Argentina)	Second round
2	Argentina	6	5	1	517	400	+117	11	Second round
3	Panama	6	2	4	455	525	−70	8	Second round
4	Cuba	6	0	6	400	539	−139	6	

Source: FIBA
Rules for classification: 1) Points; 2) Head-to-head results; 3) Points difference; 4) Points scored.
Notes:

27 November 2025	Cuba	68–80	Argentina	Havana
18:10	Scoring by quarter: 13–21, 19–20, 17–20, 19–19
	Pts: Guzmán 22; Rebs: Bombino 9 Asts: García 4	Report	Pts: Corbalán 19; Rebs: Cáffaro 10; Asts: Campazzo, Vildoza 4	Arena: Coliseo de la Ciudad Deportiva; Attendance: 4,500; Referees: Krishna Domínguez (MEX), Roberto Fernández (CRC), Julirys Guzmán (PUR)

27 November 2025	Panama	60–93	Uruguay	Panama City
20:40	Scoring by quarter: 12–28, 20–27, 15–21, 13–17
	Pts: Lindo, Mitchell 14; Rebs: Lindo 10; Asts: Jackson 3	Report	Pts: Parodi 23; Rebs: Rodríguez 8 Asts: Parodi, Rodríguez 6	Arena: Roberto Durán Arena; Referees: Roberto Vázquez (PUR), Jayson Stiell (CAN), Claudio Osorio (CHI)

30 November 2025	Uruguay	84–82	Panama	Montevideo
21:40	Scoring by quarter: 21–19, 19–22, 21–23, 23–18
	Pts: Rodríguez 29; Rebs: Rodríguez 9 Asts: Parodi 7	Report	Pts: Jackson 29; Rebs: Mitchell 12; Asts: Jackson, Mitchell 5	Arena: Antel Arena; Referees: Johnny Batista (PUR), Edwin Quiles (PUR), Nicolas Zivieri (BRA)

1 December 2025	Argentina	105–49	Cuba	Buenos Aires
19:00	Scoring by quarter: 19–18, 22–9, 34–13, 30–9
	Pts: Deck 18; Rebs: Brussino 13; Asts: Negrete 7	Report	Pts: Díaz 13; Rebs: Hechavarría 13; Asts: Chacón, Díaz 2	Arena: Estadio Obras Sanitarias; Attendance: 3,000; Referees: Daniel García (VEN), Jayson Stiell (CAN), César Gonçalves (BRA)

27 February 2026	Argentina	44–61	Uruguay	Buenos Aires
21:30	Scoring by quarter: 15–16, 7–14, 13–11, 9–20
	Pts: Corbalán 14; Rebs: Bressan, Lugarini 7 Asts: Bressan 3	Report	Pts: Rodríguez 20; Rebs: Rojas 10; Asts: Rodríguez 6	Arena: Estadio Obras Sanitarias; Attendance: 1,950; Referees: Johnny Batista (PUR), Grant Todey (USA), Cooper Toppings (CAN)

27 February 2026	Cuba	81–84	Panama	Panama City, Panama (Note: Cuba's two scheduled home matches were moved to a neutral venue, as they could not guarantee the proper organization of the games.)
20:10	Scoring by quarter: 19–29, 20–20, 30–22, 12–13
	Pts: Chacón 30; Rebs: three players 7 Asts: García 7	Report	Pts: Molinar 26; Rebs: Oglivie 10; Asts: Gaskins, Molinar 5	Arena: Roberto Durán Arena; Attendance: 6,523; Referees: Jesed Diaz (PUR), Edwin Quiles (PUR), Claudio Osorio (CHI)

2 March 2026	Argentina	101–75	Panama	Buenos Aires
18:30	Scoring by quarter: 129–18, 19–23, 23–17, 30–17
	Pts: Campazzo, Deck 25; Rebs: three players 6 Asts: Campazzo 10	Report	Pts: Molinar 16; Rebs: Rodríguez 10; Asts: Molinar 4	Arena: Estadio Obras Sanitarias; Attendance: 1,200; Referees: Krishna Domínguez (MEX), Nicolas Zivieri (BRA), Samuel Hidalgo (DOM)

2 March 2026	Cuba	62–88	Uruguay	Panama City, Panama
19:00	Scoring by quarter: 1720, 19–17, 11–22, 15–29
	Pts: Bombino 14; Rebs: Bombino 9 Asts: Chacón 5	Report	Pts: Serres 25; Rebs: Véscovi 11; Asts: Véscovi 8	Arena: Roberto Durán Arena; Referees: Roberto Vázquez (PUR), Waseem Husainy (CAN), Julirys Guzmán (PUR)

2 July 2026	Uruguay	76–91	Argentina	Montevideo
22:10	Scoring by quarter: 20–25, 24–16, 16–28, 16–22
	Pts: J. Rodríguez 19; Rebs: J. Rodríguez 9 Asts: J. Rodríguez 6	Report	Pts: Bolmaro 22; Rebs: Cáffaro 11; Asts: Deck 5	Arena: Antel Arena; Attendance: 6,675; Referees: Roberto Vázquez (PUR), Jayson Stiell (CAN), Alexis Mercado (PUR)

2 July 2026	Panama	83–70	Cuba	Panama City
20:40	Scoring by quarter: 20–15, 24–20, 17–17, 22–18
	Pts: Lindo 21; Rebs: Romero 14; Asts: Molinar 9	Report	Pts: Chacón 18; Rebs: Rodríguez 10; Asts: Chacón 6	Arena: Roberto Durán Arena; Attendance: 2,771; Referees: Johnny Batista (PUR), Fernando Leite (BRA), Diego Chiconato (BRA)

5 July 2026	Uruguay	99–70	Cuba	Montevideo
18:40	Scoring by quarter: 30–14, 26–22, 21–16, 22–18
	Pts: Taboada 27; Rebs: Gómez 8 Asts: J. Rodríguez 11	Report	Pts: Chacón 15; Rebs: Rodríguez 5 Asts: Chacón 4	Arena: Antel Arena; Attendance: 4,603; Referees: Matthew Myers (USA), Edwin Quiles (PUR), João Varella (BRA)

5 July 2026	Panama	71–96	Argentina	Panama City
19:10	Scoring by quarter: 18–26, 19–25, 19–29, 15–16
	Pts: Molinar 17; Rebs: Romero 8 Asts: Molinar 7	Report	Pts: Cáffaro 15; Rebs: Cáffaro 10; Asts: Bolmaro, Campazzo 6	Arena: Roberto Durán Arena; Attendance: 3,194; Referees: Grant Todey (USA), Carmelo De La Rosa (PUR), Ryan Langdon (CAN)

=== Second round ===
The twelve qualified teams are divided into two groups and play the other three teams from the other group twice. Group A is paired with Group C and Group B with Group D. All results from the first round are carried over.

On 14 October 2026, the final window, initially scheduled to be played from 25 February to 1 March 2027, was rescheduled to be played on two days, 25 and 28 February, with six games on each date to preserve the sporting integrity of the qualification process.

==== Group E ====
Pos	Team	Pld	W	L	PF	PA	PD	Pts	Qualification
1	United States	8	7	1	796	660	+136	15	2027 FIBA Basketball World Cup
2	Dominican Republic	8	6	2	728	628	+100	14 (Note: Dominican Republic 94–90 Brazil)	2027 FIBA Basketball World Cup
3	Brazil	8	6	2	726	625	+101	14	2027 FIBA Basketball World Cup
4	Mexico	8	5	3	743	708	+35	13	Best fourth placed team
5	Colombia	8	3	5	665	744	−79	11	
6	Chile	8	2	6	570	653	−83	10	

Updated to game(s) played on 31 August 2026. Source: FIBA
Rules for classification: 1) Points; 2) Head-to-head results; 3) Points difference; 4) Points scored.
Notes:

27 August 2026	Chile	71–89	United States	Santiago
19:10	Scoring by quarter: 8–23, 20–21, 23–24, 20–21
	Pts: Herrera 18; Rebs: Haase 13; Asts: three players 3	Report	Pts: Swider 19; Rebs: Swider 8 Asts: James 7	Arena: Centro de Deportes Colectivos; Attendance: 4,057; Referees: Julio Anaya (PAN), Andrés Bartel (URU), Waseem Husainy (CAN)

27 August 2026	Brazil	90–94	Dominican Republic	Brasília
20:10	Scoring by quarter: 29–18, 29–32, 14–25, 18–19
	Pts: Meindl 19; Rebs: Santos 8 Asts: Neto 7	Report	Pts: Montero 30; Rebs: Soriano 7 Asts: Feliz 9	Arena: Nilson Nelson Gymnasium; Attendance: 7,087; Referees: Johnny Batista (PUR), Juan Fernández (ARG), Cooper Toppings (CAN)

27 August 2026 (Note: The order of the games between Colombia and Mexico was reversed due to the 10 August 2026 Colombia earthquake.)	Mexico	112–86	Colombia	Zacatecas
20:10	Scoring by quarter: 28–25, 26–17, 28–23, 30–21
	Pts: Andriassi 28; Rebs: Gutiérrez 8 Asts: Stoll 6	Report	Pts: Angola 31; Rebs: Echenique, Solís 6 Asts: Atencia 5	Arena: Gimnasio Marcelino González; Attendance: 2,560; Referees: Roberto Vázquez (PUR), Daniel García (VEN), Julirys Guzmán (PUR)

31 August 2026	United States	104–80	Colombia	Washington, D.C.
19:00	Scoring by quarter: 32–23, 21–21, 27–12, 24–24
	Pts: Swider 18; Rebs: Robinson 9 Asts: James 9	Report	Pts: Angola 19; Rebs: Solís 10; Asts: Atencia 7	Arena: CareFirst Arena; Attendance: 715; Referees: Juan Fernández (ARG), Cooper Toppings (CAN), Franco Anselmo (ARG)

31 August 2026	Dominican Republic	101–66	Chile	Santo Domingo
20:10	Scoring by quarter: 20–16, 22–20, 33–10, 26–20
	Pts: Feliz 17; Rebs: Jones 6 Asts: Jones 5	Report	Pts: three players 10; Rebs: Haase 11; Asts: Herrera 4	Arena: Arena BanReservas; Attendance: 3,500; Referees: Roberto Vázquez (PUR), Jayson Stiell (CAN), Carmelo De La Rosa (PUR)

31 August 2026	Mexico	79–74	Brazil	Zacatecas
20:10	Scoring by quarter: 24–23, 30–21, 13–14, 12–16
	Pts: Cruz 24; Rebs: Avila 15; Asts: Stoll 5	Report	Pts: Meindl 21; Rebs: Galvanini 7 Asts: Neto 7	Arena: Gimnasio Marcelino González; Attendance: 2,894; Referees: Andrés Bartel (URU), Edwin Quiles (PUR), Alexis Mercado (PUR)

27 November 2026	Chile	vs.	Mexico	Santiago
19:40
		Report		Arena: Coliseo Ismenia Pauchard Demierre

27 November 2026	Brazil	vs.	United States	São Paulo
20:10
		Report		Arena: Ginásio do Ibirapuera

27 November 2026	Colombia	vs.	Dominican Republic	Cali
20:10
		Report		Arena: Coliseo Evangelista Mora

30 November 2026	Chile	vs.	Dominican Republic	Santiago
19:40
		Report		Arena: Coliseo Ismenia Pauchard Demierre

30 November 2026	Brazil	vs.	Mexico	São Paulo
20:10
		Report		Arena: Ginásio do Ibirapuera

30 November 2026	Colombia	vs.	United States	Cali
20:10
		Report		Arena: Coliseo Evangelista Mora

25 February 2027	United States	vs.	Chile
		Report

25 February 2027	Dominican Republic	vs.	Brazil
		Report

25 February 2027	Colombia	vs.	Mexico
		Report

28 February 2027	United States	vs.	Brazil
		Report

28 February 2027	Dominican Republic	vs.	Colombia
		Report

28 February 2027	Mexico	vs.	Chile
		Report

==== Group F ====
Pos	Team	Pld	W	L	PF	PA	PD	Pts	Qualification
1	Canada	8	8	0	807	649	+158	16	2027 FIBA Basketball World Cup
2	Uruguay	8	6	2	675	587	+88	14 (Note: Uruguay 137–135 Argentina)	2027 FIBA Basketball World Cup
3	Argentina	8	6	2	698	572	+126	14	2027 FIBA Basketball World Cup
4	Bahamas	8	4	4	746	737	+9	12	Best fourth placed team
5	Puerto Rico	8	2	6	687	722	−35	10	
6	Panama	8	2	6	603	711	−108	10	

Updated to game(s) played on 31 August 2026. Source: FIBA
Rules for classification: 1) Points; 2) Head-to-head results; 3) Points difference; 4) Points scored.
Notes:

27 August 2026	Argentina	89–75	Puerto Rico	Mar del Plata
19:10	Scoring by quarter: 25–21, 18–21, 21–12, 25–21
	Pts: Deck 23; Rebs: Cáffaro 7 Asts: Campazzo 10	Report	Pts: Alvarado 19; Rebs: Conditt 9 Asts: Alvarado 4	Arena: Polideportivo Islas Malvinas; Attendance: 5,862; Referees: Carlos Vélez (COL), Nicolas Zivieri (BRA), Carlos Peralta (ECU)

27 August 2026	Uruguay	94–103	Bahamas	Montevideo
20:10	Scoring by quarter: 20–23, 28–31, 20–21, 26–28
	Pts: J. Rodríguez 30; Rebs: Taboada 7 Asts: Véscovi 8	Report	Pts: Hield 28; Rebs: Burrows, Hield 7 Asts: Bridgewater 9	Arena: Antel Arena; Attendance: 5,541; Referees: Omar Bermúdez (MEX), Orlando Varela (HON), Roberto Fernández (CRC)

27 August 2026	Panama	66–86	Canada	Panama City
20:40	Scoring by quarter: 14–14, 20–23, 17–22, 15–27
	Pts: Rodríguez 17; Rebs: Romero 8 Asts: Gaskins 9	Report	Pts: Bell-Haynes 18; Rebs: Birch 8 Asts: Carr 12	Arena: Roberto Durán Arena; Attendance: 3,890; Referees: Alan dos Santos (BRA), Krishna Domínguez (MEX), Fernando Leite (BRA)

31 August 2026	Canada	97–92	Argentina	Quebec City
19:10	Scoring by quarter: 23–29, 25–24, 25–16, 24–23
	Pts: Alexander-Walker 26; Rebs: Kabengele 11; Asts: Carr 8	Report	Pts: Laprovíttola 31; Rebs: Bolmaro 7 Asts: Bolmaro, Campazzo 5	Arena: Centre Vidéotron; Attendance: 12,380; Referees: Omar Bermúdez (MEX), Grant Todey (USA), Diego Chiconato (BRA)

31 August 2026 (Note: The order of the games between Puerto Rico and Uruguay was reversed from the original schedule due to logistical reasons.)	Uruguay	80–75	Puerto Rico	Montevideo
20:10	Scoring by quarter: 27–20, 16–17, 21–18, 16–20
	Pts: Fitipaldo 20; Rebs: Véscovi 7 Asts: Fitipaldo, Parodi 6	Report	Pts: E. Thompson 29; Rebs: Piñeiro 7 Asts: Alvarado 9	Arena: Antel Arena; Attendance: 6,271; Referees: Daniel García (VEN), Krishna Domínguez (MEX), Fernando Leite (BRA)

31 August 2026	Bahamas	100–82	Panama	Nassau
20:10	Scoring by quarter: 27–17, 25–17, 28–33, 20–15
	Pts: Edgecombe 25; Rebs: Jones 11; Asts: Bridgewater, Miller 5	Report	Pts: Lindo 23; Rebs: Lindo, Rodríguez 9 Asts: Gaskins 7	Arena: Kendal Isaacs Gymnasium; Attendance: 700; Referees: Carlos Vélez (COL), Nicolas Zivieri (BRA), Samuel Hidalgo (DOM)

26 November 2026	Uruguay	vs.	Canada	Montevideo
19:10
		Report		Arena: Antel Arena

26 November 2026	Argentina	vs.	Bahamas	Zárate
21:40
		Report		Arena: Espacio DAM

26 November 2026	Panama	vs.	Puerto Rico	Panama City
20:40
		Report		Arena: Roberto Durán Arena

29 November 2026	Argentina	vs.	Canada	Zárate
18:10
		Report		Arena: Espacio DAM

29 November 2026	Panama	vs.	Bahamas	Panama City
18:10
		Report		Arena: Roberto Durán Arena

29 November 2026	Puerto Rico	vs.	Uruguay	Bayamón
20:10
		Report		Arena: Coliseo Rubén Rodríguez

25 February 2027	Canada	vs.	Panama
		Report

25 February 2027	Bahamas	vs.	Uruguay
		Report

25 February 2027	Puerto Rico	vs.	Argentina
		Report

28 February 2027	Canada	vs.	Uruguay
		Report

28 February 2027	Bahamas	vs.	Argentina
		Report

28 February 2027	Puerto Rico	vs.	Panama
		Report

==== Best fourth placed team ====
Pos	Grp	Team	Pld	W	L	PF	PA	PD	Pts	Qualification
1	E	Mexico	8	5	3	743	708	+35	13	2027 FIBA Basketball World Cup
2	F	Bahamas	8	4	4	746	737	+9	12	

Updated to game(s) played on 31 August 2026. Source: FIBA
