= J. R. Cadot =

Bahamian basketball player (born 1987)

Free agent
- Position: Shooting guard / small forward

Personal information
- Born: May 7, 1987 (age 39) Nassau, The Bahamas
- Listed height: 6 ft 5 in (1.96 m)
- Listed weight: 205 lb (93 kg)

Career information
- High school: C. V. Bethel (Nassau, The Bahamas)
- College: Sheridan College (2008–2010); TCU (2010–2012)
- NBA draft: 2012: undrafted
- Playing career: 2012–present

Career history
- 2012–2013: SPU Nitra
- 2015–2016: Skallagrímur
- 2016: Piratas de los Lagos
- 2016–2017: Zornotza
- 2017–2018: Navarra
- 2018: Real Canoe

Career highlights
- Third-team All-MWC (2012); NJCAA Division I Third-Team All-American (2010)

Jean Rony Cadot (May 7, 1987) is a Bahamian professional basketball player who last played for Real Canoe of the LEB Plata in Spain. A native of Nassau, he was a standout at Sheridan College and TCU, earning third-team All-Mountain West Conference accolades as a senior. Cadot has played professionally in several countries, with teams in Ecuador, Iceland, and Slovakia. He has played for the Bahamas national team on multiple occasions.

== Early life and high school ==
Cadot was born in Nassau, Bahamas to Mary Cadot and Michelet Thomas and grew up with two sisters, Renee and Melani, and three brothers, Tony, Jimmy and Michael. From his childhood, he idolized his father, saying that he "tried to live through him." Cadot started playing basketball in ninth grade and played for C. V. Bethel Senior High School in Nassau. In his junior season, he led the team to a high school championship and was named most valuable player (MVP) of the title game after erupting for 36 points, 12 rebounds and 3 steals.

== College career ==
After high school, Cadot hoped to continue his career by playing college basketball in the United States. He initially competed for a junior college for academic reasons. Cadot started his freshman season in 2008–09 at Sheridan College in Sheridan, Wyoming, averaging 15 points and 6.6 rebounds in 23 games. In his sophomore campaign, he averaged 17 points, 7.8 rebounds and 2.4 assists per game, collecting National Junior College Athletic Association (NJCAA) Third-Team All-American and first-team All-Region IX honors. He guided Sheridan College to the North Sub-Regional title by scoring 32 points and the game-winning basket against Northwest College.

Before the 2010–11 season, Cadot transferred to TCU and was praised by head coach Jim Christian for his athleticism, attitude, and defense. According to his TCU profile, he is 6.5 feet (2.0 m) tall and weighs 205 pounds (93 kg). He was mainly drawn to the program due to his relationship with its coaching staff. In his junior season, Cadot averaged 8.2 points, 6 rebounds, 1.1 assists, and 1 steal per game. As a senior, he averaged 11.4 points, 7 rebounds, 1.4 assists, and 1.5 steals per game, garnering third-team All-Mountain West Conference recognition. Cadot left TCU with the second-best career field goal percentage in school history, at 56.6 percent.

== Professional career ==
Following college, Cadot received pre-draft workout offers from the Chicago Bulls and Houston Rockets of the National Basketball Association (NBA). On August 27, 2012, he signed a one-year deal with SPU Nitra of the Slovak Extraliga. Through 26 games, Cadot averaged 16.5 points, 6.7 rebounds, 3.1 assists, and 1.9 steals per game. In October 2012, basketball website Eurobasket.com named him Player of the Week in the league after he recorded 26 points, 6 rebounds, and 7 assists versus Komárno. In February 2013, Cadot was assaulted outside a nightclub in Nitra by a group of six people who were allegedly shouting racist curses. After the incident, which began after someone spilled their drink on Cadot's pants, he had to undergo eye surgery but was reportedly followed to the hospital by his assailants. Two men were later charged with rioting, battery, and racial hatred against Cadot. He subsequently left the team.

On March 21, 2014, Cadot signed with the Wellington Saints of the National Basketball League in New Zealand. However, he was cut from the team after the preseason because he "wasn't the right fit." On August 1, 2015, Cadot joined Skallagrímur of the Division I, the second-tier league in Iceland, as a designated import player. On March 18, 2016, he posted a double-double of 29 points and 15 rebounds against Fjölnir. After 28 games, Cadot was averaging 24.1 points, 16.1 rebounds, 5.1 assists, 2.2 steals, and 1.9 blocks per game, leading Skallagrímur to the playoff title. He earned Eurobasket.com All-Icelandic D1 Player of the Year and Finals MVP honors. In 2016, he became a starter for Piratas de los Lagos of the National League in Ecuador.

Cadot spent the following season in Spain with Zornotza. He posted 11.1 points and 6.6 rebounds per game in 31 games. In October 2017, Cadot was drafted by the Windsor Express with the 13th overall pick in the National Basketball League of Canada Draft. Instead of joining the Express, he signed with Navarra. He made an immediate impact, scoring 13 points in Navarra's 84–72 win over L'Hospitalet. Later in the season he joined Real Canoe, which fell 0–2 in the playoffs.

== National team career ==
In his early career, Cadot was selected to represent The Bahamas at the junior levels. He made his senior debut with the Bahamas national basketball team at the FIBA CBC Championship in 2006, scoring 2 points through 3 games in limited minutes. Cadot assumed a bigger role at the 2011 edition of the tournament, where he averaged 10.8 points and 7.2 rebounds per game. He also took part in the Centrobasket in 2012 and 2016.

== Personal life ==
Cadot's father Michelet Thomas died in early 2010 after suffering a serious illness. Cadot reflected, "Everything I do on and off the court now, I do for my dad."
