= 2016 Centrobasket =

2016 FIBA Centrobasket
25th Central American and Caribbean Basketball Championship

Tournament details
- Host country: Panama
- City: Panama City
- Dates: 19–25 June 2016
- Teams: 10 (from 1 confederation)
- Venue(s): 1 (in 1 host city)

Final positions
- Champions: Puerto Rico (11th title)

Tournament statistics
- MVP: (Puerto Rico) J. J. Barea
- Top scorer: (Nicaragua) Thomas (16.8)
- Top rebounds: (The Bahamas) Ayton (11.1)
- Top assists: (Puerto Rico) Barea (6.4)
- PPG (Team): Puerto Rico (89.7)
- RPG (Team): Bahamas (10.1)
- APG (Team): Puerto Rico (21.7)

Official website
- www.fiba.basketball

The 2016 Men's Central American and Caribbean Basketball Championship, also known as 2016 Centrobasket, was the regional basketball championship of FIBA Americas for the Central American and Caribbean subzone. The top five teams qualified for the 2017 FIBA AmeriCup; the top seven teams qualified for the 2019 FIBA Basketball World Cup qualification and for the 2018 Central American and Caribbean Games. The tournament was held in the Panama City from 19 to 25 June 2016.

Puerto Rico won their 11th Centrobasket title by defeating Mexico in the final, 84–83.

== Participating teams ==
- Automatic qualifiers: (Top four in 2014 Centrobasket)
  - Mexico
  - Puerto Rico
  - Dominican Republic
  - Cuba
- Caribbean subzone: (Top three in 2015 FIBA CBC Championship)
  - Virgin Islands
  - Bahamas
  - Antigua and Barbuda
- Central American subzone: (Top three in 2015 FIBA COCABA Championship)
  - Panama (Hosts)
  - Costa Rica
  - Nicaragua

== Preliminary round ==
The draw was held on 29 March 2016.

=== Group A ===
Pos	Team	Pld	W	L	PF	PA	PD	Pts	Qualification
1	Panama	4	4	0	365	243	+122	8	Semifinals
2	Puerto Rico	4	3	1	380	279	+101	7	Semifinals
3	Cuba	4	2	2	326	293	+33	6	Fifth place match
4	Nicaragua	4	1	3	241	357	−116	5	Seventh place match
5	Antigua and Barbuda	4	0	4	242	382	−140	4	

Source: FIBA
Rules for classification: 1) Points; 2) Head-to-head results; 3) Points difference; 4) Points scored.

19 June

Boxscore

Nicaragua	50–98	Cuba
Scoring by quarter: 14–24, 15–31, 8–20, 13–23
Pts: Ponce 13; Rebs: López 11; Asts: Ponce 5		Pts: Justiz 18; Rebs: Cubilla 8 Asts: Rodríguez 7

Roberto Durán Arena, Panama City
Referees: José Reyes (MEX), Mauricio Chinchilla (CRC), Kendell Henry (ISV)

19 June

Boxscore

Panama	103–48	Antigua and Barbuda
Scoring by quarter: 23–9, 25–9, 32–14, 23–16
Pts: Bishop 17; Rebs: Lloreda 13; Asts: Muñoz 6		Pts: McIntosh 11; Rebs: Sergeant 7 Asts: Meade 2

Roberto Durán Arena, Panama City
Referees: Pablo Estevez (ARG), Robinson Aracena (DOM), Christian Wilmore (BAH)

20 June

Boxscore

Antigua and Barbuda	62–74	Nicaragua
Scoring by quarter: 15–22, 13–13, 13–23, 21–16
Pts: McCoy 15; Rebs: Desouza 11; Asts: McCoy 6		Pts: Thomas 18; Rebs: López 13; Asts: Ponce 8

Roberto Durán Arena, Panama City
Referees: Robinson Aracena (DOM), Kendell Henry (ISV), Christian Wilmore (BAH)

20 June

Boxscore

Puerto Rico	64–87	Panama
Scoring by quarter: 19–17, 18–28, 10–24, 17–18
Pts: Ramos 14; Rebs: Ramos 6 Asts: Vassallo 5		Pts: Bishop 18; Rebs: Lloreda 10; Asts: Muñoz 8

Roberto Durán Arena, Panama City
Referees: Cristiano Maranho (BRA), José Reyes (MEX), Michael Weiland (CAN)

21 June

Boxscore

Cuba	88–66	Antigua and Barbuda
Scoring by quarter: 20–15, 18–13, 24–20, 26–18
Pts: Justiz 18; Rebs: Yaca 10; Asts: Oliva 5		Pts: McCoy 15; Rebs: McIntosh 8 Asts: Achom 5

Roberto Durán Arena, Panama City
Referees: José Reyes (MEX), Mauricio Chinchilla (CRC), Kendell Henry (ISV)

21 June

Boxscore

Nicaragua	57–98	Puerto Rico
Scoring by quarter: 12–24, 13–23, 18–24, 14–27
Pts: Abea 19; Rebs: López 8 Asts: Thomas 4		Pts: Clemente 22; Rebs: Clemente 10; Asts: Vassallo 6

Roberto Durán Arena, Panama City
Referees: Pablo Estevez (ARG), Robinson Aracena (DOM), Christian Wilmore (BAH)

22 June

Boxscore

Puerto Rico	101–69	Cuba
Scoring by quarter: 20–18, 26–14, 21–17, 34–20
Pts: Rosario 25; Rebs: Clemente 8 Asts: Barea 11		Pts: Granda 21; Rebs: Justiz 9 Asts: Rodríguez 3

Roberto Durán Arena, Panama City
Referees: Cristiano Maranho (BRA), Mauricio Chinchilla (CRC), Michael Weiland (CAN)

22 June

Boxscore

Panama	99–60	Nicaragua
Scoring by quarter: 17–19, 19–16, 32–9, 31–16
Pts: Hicks 16; Rebs: King 6 Asts: Muñoz 5		Pts: Thomas 20; Rebs: Camacho 5 Asts: Ponce 5

Roberto Durán Arena, Panama City
Referees: José Reyes (MEX), Rodrigo Mejia (COL), Christian Wilmore (BAH)

23 June

Boxscore

Antigua and Barbuda	66–117	Puerto Rico
Scoring by quarter: 15–32, 10–32, 18–23, 23–30
Pts: McCoy 16; Rebs: Burton, Sergeant 9 Asts: Achom, McCoy 4		Pts: Galindo 21; Rebs: three players 5 Asts: Abreu 14

Roberto Durán Arena, Panama City
Referees: José Reyes (MEX), Mauricio Chinchilla (CRC), Christian Wilmore (BAH)

23 June

Boxscore

Cuba	71–76	Panama
Scoring by quarter: 17–20, 10–17, 21–17, 23–22
Pts: Jaca 13; Rebs: Jaca 7 Asts: Rodriguez 4		Pts: Hicks 18; Rebs: Bishop 11; Asts: Bishop 6

Roberto Durán Arena, Panama City
Referees: Pablo Estevez (ARG), Robinson Aracena (DOM), Kendell Henry (ISV)

=== Group B ===
Pos	Team	Pld	W	L	PF	PA	PD	Pts	Qualification
1	Dominican Republic	4	4	0	323	276	+47	8	Semifinals
2	Mexico	4	3	1	322	292	+30	7	Semifinals
3	Virgin Islands	4	2	2	309	308	+1	6	Fifth place match
4	Bahamas	4	1	3	317	311	+6	5	Seventh place match
5	Costa Rica	4	0	4	230	314	−84	4	

Source: FIBA
Rules for classification: 1) Points; 2) Head-to-head results; 3) Points difference; 4) Points scored.

19 June

Boxscore

Virgin Islands	82–74	Bahamas
Scoring by quarter: 21–10, 14–17, 26–23, 21–24
Pts: Hart 18; Rebs: Aska 8 Asts: Hodge 7		Pts: Ayton 16; Rebs: Ayton 11; Asts: Carey 5

Roberto Durán Arena, Panama City
Referees: Jorge Vazquez (PUR), Rodrigo Mejia (COL), Michael Weiland (CAN)

19 June

Boxscore

Costa Rica	58–79	Dominican Republic
Scoring by quarter: 7–18, 17–16, 10–23, 24–22
Pts: Castrillo 15; Rebs: Castrillo 6 Asts: Conejo 10		Pts: Mendoza, Vargas 15; Rebs: Delgado, Vargas 9 Asts: Coronado, Rojas 4

Roberto Durán Arena, Panama City
Referees: Jose Carrion (PUR), Adrián Fernández (CUB), Allan Mercado (NCA)

20 June

Boxscore

Bahamas	82–58	Costa Rica
Scoring by quarter: 27–4, 13–21, 20–18, 22–15
Pts: Ayton 18; Rebs: Ayton 9 Asts: Joseph 7		Pts: Martinez, Simmons 13; Rebs: Wilson 6 Asts: Martinez, Wilson 3

Roberto Durán Arena, Panama City
Referees: Jose Carrion (PUR), Allan Mercado (NCA), Rodrigo Mejia (COL)

20 June

Boxscore

Mexico	91–83 (OT)	Virgin Islands
Scoring by quarter: 18–13, 16–17, 22–29, 19–16, Overtime: 16–8
Pts: Cruz 27; Rebs: Hernández 14; Asts: J. Gutiérrez 8		Pts: Aska 22; Rebs: Williams 8 Asts: Milligan, Rivera 4

Roberto Durán Arena, Panama City
Referees: Pablo Estevez (ARG), Adrián Fernández (CUB), Jorge Vázquez (PUR)

21 June

Boxscore

Costa Rica	46–78	Mexico
Scoring by quarter: 9–11, 14–25, 11–25, 12–17
Pts: Martinez 9 Rebs: Castrillo 5 Asts: Wilson 2		Pts: Zamora 11; Rebs: Mata 8 Asts: Cruz, J. Gutiérrez 3

Roberto Durán Arena, Panama City
Referees: Michael Weiland (CAN), Julio Anaya (PAN), Rodrigo Mejia (COL)

21 June

Boxscore

Dominican Republic	87–80	Bahamas
Scoring by quarter: 23–17, 20–19, 23–18, 21–26
Pts: Liz 23; Rebs: García, Liz 6 Asts: Coronado 6		Pts: Nesbitt 18; Rebs: Ayton 15; Asts: Joseph 4

Roberto Durán Arena, Panama City
Referees: Cristiano Maranho (BRA), Adrián Fernández (CUB), Jorge Vazquez (PUR)

22 June

Boxscore

Virgin Islands	75–68	Costa Rica
Scoring by quarter: 18–11, 14–28, 19–7, 24–22
Pts: Hodge 14; Rebs: Jones, Williams 8 Asts: Hodge 7		Pts: Martinez 16; Rebs: Simmons 10; Asts: Sanchez

Roberto Durán Arena, Panama City
Referees: Jorge Vazquez (PUR), Adrián Fernández (CUB), Allan Mercado (NCA)

22 June

Boxscore

Mexico	69–82	Dominican Republic
Scoring by quarter: 20–17, 13–16, 12–20, 24–29
Pts: J. Gutiérrez 21; Rebs: Hernández 7 Asts: Cruz 5		Pts: Vargas 20; Rebs: Delgado 8 Asts: Coronado 7

Roberto Durán Arena, Panama City
Referees: Pablo Estevez (ARG), Julio Anaya (PAN), Jose Carrion (PUR)

23 June

Boxscore

Bahamas	81–84	Mexico
Scoring by quarter: 26–18, 20–18, 27–24, 8–24
Pts: Ayton 24; Rebs: Ayton 9 Asts: Cooper 6		Pts: Hernández 24; Rebs: Gutiérrez 12; Asts: Gutiérrez 10

Roberto Durán Arena, Panama City
Referees: Jorge Vazquez (PUR), Rodrigo Mejia (COL), Allan Mercado (NCA)

23 June

Boxscore

Dominican Republic	75–69	Virgin Islands
Scoring by quarter: 12–14, 24–23, 27–12, 12–20
Pts: Delgado 21; Rebs: Delgado 12; Asts: Mendoza, Rojas 3		Pts: Hodge 15; Rebs: Williams 10; Asts: Hodge 5

Roberto Durán Arena, Panama City
Referees: Jose Carrion (PUR), Julio Anaya (PAN), Adrián Fernández (CUB)

== Final round ==
Semifinals
24 June
Panama	52
Mexico	59
24 June
Dominican Republic	69
Puerto Rico	74

Final
25 June
Mexico	83
Puerto Rico	84
Third place
25 June
Panama	48
Dominican Republic	64

=== Semifinals ===
24 June

Boxscore

Dominican Republic	69–74	Puerto Rico
Scoring by quarter: 25–18, 12–13, 13–22, 19–21
Pts: Vargas 18; Rebs: Delgado, Vargas 6 Asts: Coronado, Liz 4		Pts: Vassallo 18; Rebs: Balkman, Sanchez 8 Asts: Barea 8

Roberto Durán Arena, Panama City
Referees: Cristiano Maranho (BRA), Kendell Henry (ISV), Rodrigo Mejia (COL)

24 June

Boxscore

Panama	52–59	Mexico
Scoring by quarter: 16–18, 15–14, 11–18, 10–9
Pts: Luzcando 18; Rebs: Mitchell 9 Asts: Lloreda, Luzcando 3		Pts: Gutiérrez 15; Rebs: Mata 11; Asts: Gutiérrez, Stoll 4

Roberto Durán Arena, Panama City
Referees: Pablo Estevez (ARG), Michael Weiland (CAN), Christian Wilmore (BAH)

=== Seventh place game ===
24 June

Boxscore

Nicaragua	77–120	Bahamas
Scoring by quarter: 21–32, 6–32, 22–30, 28–26
Pts: Thomas 29; Rebs: Muñoz 14; Asts: Camacho 3		Pts: Cadot 18; Rebs: Smith 8 Asts: Cooper 6

Roberto Durán Arena, Panama City
Referees: Jose Carrion (PUR), Robinson Aracena (DOM), Mauricio Chinchilla (CRC)

=== Fifth place game ===
24 June

Boxscore

Cuba	70–95	Virgin Islands
Scoring by quarter: 19–21, 16–22, 17–28, 18–24
Pts: Rodriguez 21; Rebs: Granda 8 Asts: Rodriguez 5		Pts: Hodge 19; Rebs: Williams 6 Asts: Hodge 8

Roberto Durán Arena, Panama City
Referees: José Reyes (MEX), Julio Anaya (PAN), Jorge Vazquez (PUR)

=== Third place game ===
25 June

Boxscore

Panama	48–64	Dominican Republic
Scoring by quarter: 5–20, 16–10, 14–24, 13–10
Pts: Lloreda 11; Rebs: Lloreda 11; Asts: Oglivie 3		Pts: Rojas 11; Rebs: Delgado 7 Asts: Coronado 3

Roberto Durán Arena, Panama City
Referees: Jorge Vazquez (PUR), Rodrigo Mejia (COL), José Reyes (MEX)

=== Final ===
25 June

Boxscore

Mexico	83–84	Puerto Rico
Scoring by quarter: 22–24, 12–25, 29–16, 20–19
Pts: Hernández 20; Rebs: Hernández 10; Asts: Stoll 8		Pts: Barea 17; Rebs: Balkman, Ramos 6 Asts: Barea 9

Roberto Durán Arena, Panama City
Referees: Pablo Estevez (ARG), Julio Anaya (PAN), Cristiano Maranho (BRA)

2016 Centrobasket winners

Puerto Rico
11th title

== Final standings ==
The top five teams qualified for the 2017 FIBA AmeriCup and the top seven teams qualified for both the 2018 Central American and Caribbean Games and the 2019 FIBA Basketball World Cup qualification.

Rank	Team	Record
1st place, gold medalist(s)	Puerto Rico	5–1
2nd place, silver medalist(s)	Mexico	4–2
3rd place, bronze medalist(s)	Dominican Republic	5–1
4	Panama	4–2
5	Virgin Islands	3–2
6	Cuba	2–3
7	Bahamas	2–3
8	Nicaragua	1–4
9	Costa Rica	0–4
10	Antigua and Barbuda	0–4

Qualified for the 2017 FIBA AmeriCup, 2018 Central American and Caribbean Games and the 2019 FIBA Basketball World Cup qualification
Qualified for the 2018 Central American and Caribbean Games and the 2019 FIBA Basketball World Cup qualification
