= 2012 Centrobasket =

2012 FIBA Centrobasket
23rd Central American and Caribbean Basketball Championship
- Official logo of the 2012 Centrobasket Championship

Tournament details
- Host country: Puerto Rico
- Dates: June 18–24, 2012
- Teams: 10
- Venue(s): 1 (in 1 host city)

Final positions
- Champions: Dominican Republic (3rd title)

The 2012 Men's Central American and Caribbean Basketball Championship, also known as 2012 Centrobasket, was the regional championship of FIBA Americas for Central America and Caribbean subzone, played June 18–24, 2012. The top four teams qualified for the 2013 FIBA Americas Championship.

== Participating teams ==
- From the 2011 CBC Championship:
  - Virgin Islands
  - Bahamas
  - Jamaica
- From Central America:
  - Costa Rica
  - Mexico
  - Nicaragua
- Participants from 2011 FIBA Americas Championship:
  - Cuba
  - Dominican Republic
  - Panama
  - Puerto Rico

== Preliminary round ==
=== Group A ===
Team	Pld	W	L	PF	PA	PD	Pts
Puerto Rico	4	4	0	382	259	+123	8
Panama	4	3	1	325	288	+37	7
Bahamas	4	2	2	338	296	+42	6
Cuba	4	1	3	275	317	−42	5
Nicaragua	4	0	4	236	396	−160	4

June 18
15:30

Report

Cuba	68–80	Bahamas
Scoring by quarter: 16–19, 16–20, 22–18, 14–23
Pts: Perez 19; Rebs: Haiti 9 Asts: Haiti 5		Pts: Gray 16; Rebs: Burrows 8 Asts: Gray 6

José Miguel Agrelot Coliseum, San Juan

June 18
20:30

Report

Puerto Rico	92–60	Panama
Scoring by quarter: 17–17, 25–7, 25–21, 25–15
Pts: Huertas 16; Rebs: Sanchez, Ramos 7 Asts: Barea 12		Pts: St. Rose 15; Rebs: Tesis 6 Asts: Munoz 4

José Miguel Agrelot Coliseum, San Juan

June 19
15:30

Report

Nicaragua	47–80	Cuba
Scoring by quarter: 12–18, 8–24, 14–19, 13–19
Pts: Thomas 9 Rebs: Muñoz 9 Asts: Makence 5		Pts: Valdez 34; Rebs: Haiti 13; Asts: Rodriguez 8

José Miguel Agrelot Coliseum, San Juan

June 19
20:30

Report

Bahamas	71–88	Puerto Rico
Scoring by quarter: 11-20, 16-18, 15-25, 29-25
Pts: Gray 14; Rebs: Davis 10; Asts: Cox 4		Pts: Huertas 21; Rebs: Ramos 9 Asts: Rodriguez 6

José Miguel Agrelot Coliseum, San Juan

June 20
15:30

Report

Panama	78–70	Bahamas

José Miguel Agrelot Coliseum, San Juan

June 20
20:30

Report

Puerto Rico	107–67	Nicaragua

José Miguel Agrelot Coliseum, San Juan

June 21

Nicaragua	60–93	Panama

José Miguel Agrelot Coliseum, San Juan

June 21

Cuba	61–95	Puerto Rico

José Miguel Agrelot Coliseum, San Juan

June 22

Bahamas	116–62	Nicaragua

José Miguel Agrelot Coliseum, San Juan

June 22

Panama	94–66	Cuba

José Miguel Agrelot Coliseum, San Juan

=== Group B ===
Team	Pld	W	L	PF	PA	PD	Pts
Dominican Republic	4	4	0	312	255	+57	8
Jamaica	4	3	1	311	279	+32	7
Mexico	4	2	2	305	290	+15	6
Virgin Islands	4	1	3	296	297	−1	5
Costa Rica	4	0	4	238	341	−103	4

June 18

Jamaica	91–61	Costa Rica

José Miguel Agrelot Coliseum, San Juan

June 18

Mexico	75–67	Virgin Islands

José Miguel Agrelot Coliseum, San Juan

June 19

Virgin Islands	64–80	Jamaica

José Miguel Agrelot Coliseum, San Juan

June 19

Dominican Republic	85–67	Mexico

José Miguel Agrelot Coliseum, San Juan

June 20

Costa Rica	64–92	Virgin Islands

José Miguel Agrelot Coliseum, San Juan

June 20

Jamaica	64–80	Dominican Republic

José Miguel Agrelot Coliseum, San Juan

June 21

Mexico	74–76	Jamaica

José Miguel Agrelot Coliseum, San Juan

June 21

Dominican Republic	69–51	Costa Rica

José Miguel Agrelot Coliseum, San Juan

June 22

Costa Rica	68–89	Mexico

José Miguel Agrelot Coliseum, San Juan

June 22

Virgin Islands	73–78	Dominican Republic

José Miguel Agrelot Coliseum, San Juan

== Knockout round ==
Semifinals
23 June
Puerto Rico	103
Jamaica	89
23 June
Dominican Republic	79
Panama	62

Final
24 June
Puerto Rico	72
Dominican Republic	80
3rd place
24 June
Jamaica	78
Panama	74

=== Semifinals ===
June 23

Dominican Republic	79–62	Panama

José Miguel Agrelot Coliseum, San Juan

June 23

Puerto Rico	103–89	Jamaica

José Miguel Agrelot Coliseum, San Juan

=== Third place playoff ===
June 23

Panama	54–78	Jamaica

José Miguel Agrelot Coliseum, San Juan

=== Finals ===
June 23

Dominican Republic	80–72	Puerto Rico

José Miguel Agrelot Coliseum, San Juan

== Final ranking ==
Qualifies to the 2013 FIBA Americas Championship
Qualifies to the 2013 FIBA Americas Championship as a wildcard
Suspended by FIBA and disqualified

Rank	Team	Record
1st place, gold medalist(s)	Dominican Republic	6–0
2nd place, silver medalist(s)	Puerto Rico	5–1
3rd place, bronze medalist(s)	Jamaica	4–2
4	Panama	3–3
5	Bahamas	2–2
6	Mexico	2–2
7	Virgin Islands	1–3
8	Cuba	1–3
9	Costa Rica	0–4
9	Nicaragua	0–4

=== Suspension of Panama ===
In 2013, FIBA suspended the Panamanian Basketball Federation "for many problems that Panama has been going through for several years due to conflicts of interest between two Directives that manifest hold the same authority," as announced by FIBA Secretary-General Patrick Baumann. This means Panama's "national teams and clubs and referees, cannot participate in any international competition."
