= Gimnasio Marcelino González =

Arena in Zacatecas, Mexico

Coordinates: 22.7648°N 102.5488°W

- El Marcelino
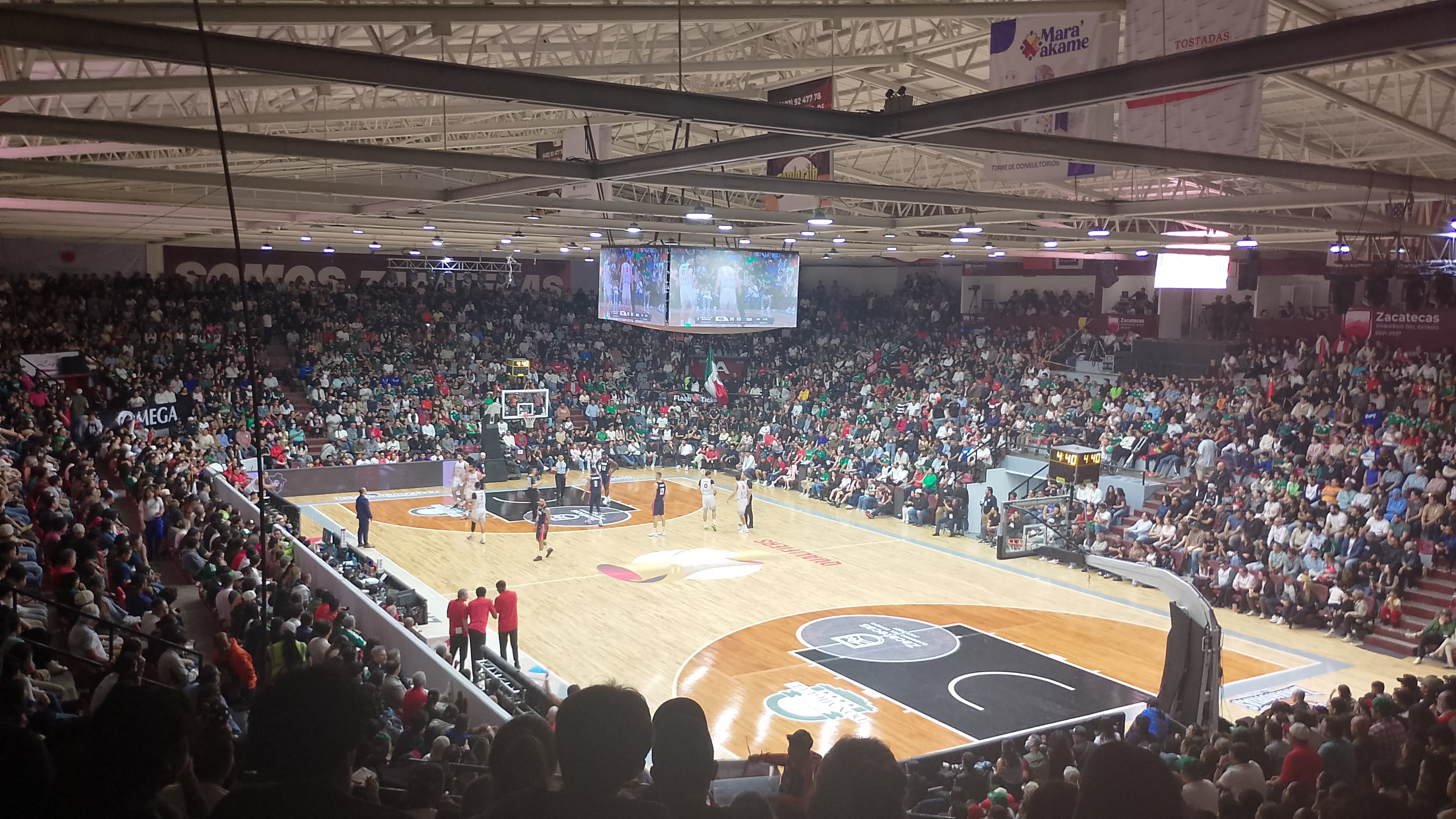
- Interactive map of Gimnasio Marcelino González
- Full name: Gimnasio Profesor Marcelino González
- Location: Zacatecas City, Zacatecas, Mexico
- Owner: Instituto de Cultura Física y Deporte del Estado de Zacatecas
- Capacity: 3,458

Construction
- Opened: 1986
- Renovated: 2015

Tenants
- Mineros de Zacatecas (LNBP) (2017–present); Barreteros de Zacatecas (LNBP) (2001–2016)

The Gimnasio Marcelino González is an arena in Zacatecas City, Mexico. The arena was opened in 1986; it was named for the renowned professor Marcelino González. The arena is the home venue of the Mineros de Zacatecas.With a capacity of 3,458 spectators. Located on Calzada de los Deportes s/n, it is managed by the Institute of Physical Culture and Sports of the State of Zacatecas (Incufidez).

== Usage ==
The Marcelino González mainly hosts professional and international basketball games, as well as major professional wrestling shows.

=== Basketball ===
Barreteros de Zacatecas formally joined the LNBP in 2003 with the Marcelino González as their official home. The name "Barreteros" paid direct homage to the workers of the state's mines.

The squad played its last official season under the identity of Barreteros in the 2016-2017 LNBP season, and in the second half of 2017, the franchise was completely restructured and changed its name to Mineros de Zacatecas.

Mineras de Zacatecas of the Liga de Mexico women's professional league also plays at the arena, having been the venue for the 2026 Final Four where Mineras were crowned as national champions.

In September 2026. Gimnasio Marcelino González hosted the Copa Value. A mid-season event of the LNBP that brings together the eight top-ranked teams in the league halfway through the regular season.Mineros obtained the championship at their home court after defeating Astros de Jalisco in the final 87-71.

=== International basketball ===
The arena served as the official home of the Mexican National Basketball Team during the 2027 FIBA World Cup qualifying second round windows against Dominican Republic, Nicaragua. the United States.Colombia and Brazil.

In these games, the Mexican National Team made 28 three-pointers against Colombia on August 27, 2026, setting a new FIBA record for an international match and surpassing the record Australia had set against Guam just a month earlier.

Date	Competition	Home team	Result	Away team	Ref.
28 November 2025	2027 FIBA World Cup qualifying first round	Mexico	85–92	Dominican Republic	Report
3 July 2026	2027 FIBA World Cup qualifying first round	Mexico	98–79	Nicaragua	Report
6 July 2026	2027 FIBA World Cup qualifying first round	Mexico	93–94	United States	Report
27 August 2026	2027 FIBA World Cup qualifying second round	Mexico	112–86	Colombia	Report
31 August 2026	2027 FIBA World Cup qualifying second round	Mexico	79–74	Brazil	Report

=== Pro Wrestling ===
The arena constantly receives full lineups from the largest promotions in the country, bringing stars from the Consejo Mundial de Lucha Libre and Lucha Libre AAA Worldwide.

=== Boxing ===
The fight for the IBF Super Flyweight World Championship in May 23, 2025 was broadcast internationally by networks such as ESPN, Disney+, and Televisa. The bout was won by Willibaldo García over René Calixto, on the same gala, the undefeated Sinaloan prospect Misael Aldana extended his winning streak, while Luis "El Flaco" Rodríguez triumphed over Aldo Cedeño on the undercard.

=== MMA ===
The Marcelino González Gym has established itself as the main venue for Mixed Martial Arts (MMA) in the state thanks to its partnerships with LUX Fight League, the most important MMA organization in Latin America. LUX 057 in December 5, 2025 was the grand season finale event of the league.
