= Chase Audige =

American basketball player

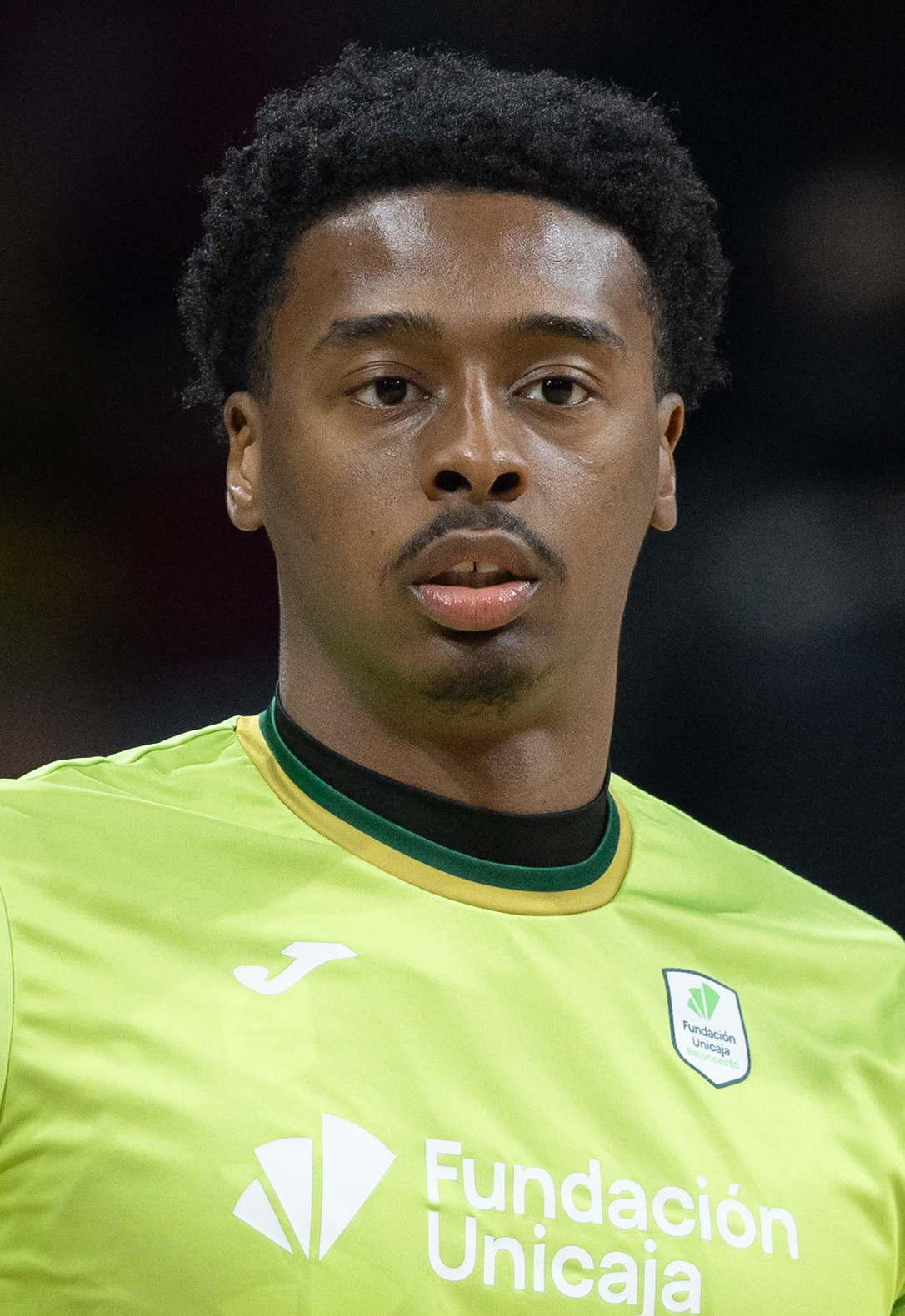
- Audige in 2026

No. 1 – San Pablo Burgos
- Position: Shooting guard / point guard
- League: Liga ACB; EuroCup

Personal information
- Born: June 29, 1999 (age 27) Coram, New York, U.S.
- Listed height: 6 ft 4 in (1.93 m)
- Listed weight: 200 lb (91 kg)

Career information
- High school: The Hill School (Pottstown, Pennsylvania)
- College: William & Mary (2018–2019); Northwestern (2020–2023)
- NBA draft: 2023: undrafted
- Playing career: 2023–present

Career history
- 2023–2024: Windy City Bulls
- 2024–2025: Oostende
- 2025: Bosna
- 2025–2026: Unicaja
- 2026–present: San Pablo Burgos

Career highlights
- Second-team All-Big Ten (2023)
- Stats at NBA.com
- Stats at Basketball Reference

Chase Audige (born June 29, 1999) is a Jamaican-American professional basketball player for San Pablo Burgos of the Spanish Liga ACB. He played collegiately at William & Mary and Northwestern before joining the NBA G League and later signing with Filou Oostende in Belgium.

== Early life and college career ==
Audige was born in Coram, New York, and raised in Pottstown, Pennsylvania. He attended The Hill School before playing two seasons at the College of William & Mary and then transferring to Northwestern University. At Northwestern, he earned recognition for his defensive abilities, receiving All-Big Ten honors and finishing as a finalist for the Naismith Defensive Player of the Year award in 2023.

== Professional career ==
After going undrafted in the 2023 NBA draft, Audige joined the Washington Wizards for Summer League play and later signed with the Windy City Bulls of the NBA G League, averaging 4.8 points and 2.9 rebounds per game.

In August 2024, he signed with Belgian champions Filou Oostende, competing in the BNXT League and the Basketball Champions League. During the 2024–25 Basketball Champions League season, Audige averaged 14.8 points, 4.1 rebounds, and 3.2 assists per game over nine appearances. In Belgian/BNXT League play, he earned monthly awards and contributed to Oostende’s championship campaigns.

On October 31, 2024, the Windy City Bulls traded Audige's returning player rights, along with a 2025 second-round draft pick, to the Long Island Nets in exchange for the returning rights to Jordan Hall.

On July 28, 2025, he signed with KK Bosna BH Telecom of the Bosnian League and the ABA League.

On December 2, 2025, Audige signed with Unicaja Málaga of the Spanish Liga ACB and the Basketball Champions League.

In July 2026, Audige moved to San Pablo Burgos of the Spanish Liga ACB.

== National team career ==
Born in the United States, Audige is of Jamaican descent through his mother and holds a dual citizenship. He made his debut for the senior Jamaican national team in November 2025 during the 2027 World Cup qualifiers. In the first four qualifier games, he averaged 17.3 points, 4.0 assists and 2.8 steals.

== Player profile ==
Audige stands 6 ft 4 in (193 cm) and weighs approximately 200 lb (91 kg). He is recognized for his athleticism, perimeter defense, and versatility on both ends of the floor.
