= Nicaragua men's national under-17 basketball team =

Nicaragua
- FIBA zone: FIBA Americas
- National federation: Federación Nicaraguense de Baloncesto

U19 World Cup
- Appearances: None

U18 AmeriCup
- Appearances: None

U17 Centrobasket
- Appearances: 1 (2009)
- Medals: None

The Nicaragua men's national under-17 basketball team is a national basketball team of Nicaragua, administered by the Federación Nicaraguense de Baloncesto. It represents the country in men's international under-17 basketball competitions.

== FIBA U17 Centrobasket ==
So far, Nicaragua's only participation at the FIBA U17 Centrobasket was in 2009, where they finished in 7th place.

== See also ==
- Nicaragua men's national basketball team
- Nicaragua women's national under-17 basketball team
