= Costa Caribe =

Nicaraguan basketball team

- Nickname: The Lobstermen
- Leagues: Liga Superior de Baloncesto
- Founded: 2018
- Location: Managua, Nicaragua
- Team colors: Green, gold, white
- Head coach: Chester Linarte
- Championships: 1 (2023)
- Website: Official website
Home	Away	Third

Costa Caribe are a Nicaraguan professional basketball team that compete in Nicaragua's Liga Superior de Baloncesto (LSB). They have played in the Liga Centroamericana de clubes de baloncesto, where they reached the Final Four in the 2016 edition. Costa Caribe has traditionally provided Nicaragua's national basketball team with key players.

== Players ==
=== Current roster ===
Costa Caribe roster
Players
Coaches

Pos.	No.	Nat.	Name	Ht.	Age
SG	0	(Nicaragua)	Morales, Robiel	1.90 m (6 ft 3 in)	24 – 3 August 2001
G	1	(Puerto Rico)	Matos, Jorge	1.86 m (6 ft 1 in)	33 – 30 April 1992
G/F	2	(Nicaragua)	Blandford, Tyler	1.88 m (6 ft 2 in)	19 – 25 January 2007
G	3	(Nicaragua)	Britton, Vankel	1.84 m (6 ft 0 in)	22 – 18 December 2003
G/F	4	(Nicaragua)	Wilson, Brandon	1.90 m (6 ft 3 in)	30 – 21 April 1995
F	5	(Nicaragua)	Wilson, Wyvon	1.95 m (6 ft 5 in)	24 – 10 January 2002
G	6	(Nicaragua)	Gallo, Josafat	1.80 m (5 ft 11 in)	21 – 1 December 2004
G/F	11	(Nicaragua)	Waters, Kiborn	1.93 m (6 ft 4 in)	23 – 10 February 2003
G	12	(Nicaragua)	McMeo, Shaen	1.82 m (6 ft 0 in)	19 – 28 April 2006
F	13	(Nicaragua)	Hernandez, Luder	1.98 m (6 ft 6 in)	30 – 28 February 1995
F	14	(Nicaragua)	Moody, Webeans	2.00 m (6 ft 7 in)	24 – 20 October 2001
C	15	(Nicaragua)	Perez, Hans	2.07 m (6 ft 9 in)	23 – 9 January 2003
PF	00	(Puerto Rico)	Medina, Oenis	2.03 m (6 ft 8 in)	27 – 25 May 1998

Head coach

- (Nicaragua) Omar Pereira

Assistant coach(es)

- (Nicaragua) David Rosario
- (Nicaragua) Ramon Rios

Legend

- (C) Team captain
- Injured

Pos.	Starting 5	Bench 1	Bench 2
C	Oenis Medina	Hans Perez
PF	Luder Hernandez	Webeans Moody
SF	Brandon Wilson	Wyvon Wilson	Kiborn Waters
SG	Jorge Matos	Robiel Morales	Tyler Blandford
PG	Vankel Britton	Shaen McMeo	Josafat Gallo

=== Notable players ===
- Set a club record or won an individual award as a professional player.
- Played at least one official international match for his senior national team at any time.

- (Nicaragua) Dalton Cacho
- (Nicaragua) Dayton Cacho
- (Nicaragua) Jensen Campbell
- (Nicaragua) Noel McKenzie
- (Nicaragua) Denzel Moody
