= Sheridan College (Wyoming) =

Community college in Sheridan, Wyoming, US

Coordinates: 44°45′53″N 106°56′33″W

- Type: Public community college
- Established: 1948; 78 years ago
- Parent institution: Northern Wyoming Community College District
- President: Walter Tribely
- Students: 2,053
- Location: Sheridan, Wyoming, United States
- Campus: 16,000 sq ft (1,500 m^{2})
- Colors
- Sporting affiliations: NJCAA, NIRA
- Mascot: Generals
- Website: sheridan.edu

Sheridan College is a public community college in Sheridan, Wyoming, United States. It is part of the Northern Wyoming Community College District (NWCCD) and serves students in Sheridan and Johnson counties. The college offers associate degrees, certificates, and a bachelor's degree program in Management and Leadership; the college focuses on workforce development, career training, and transfer pathways to four-year institutions.

== Campus ==
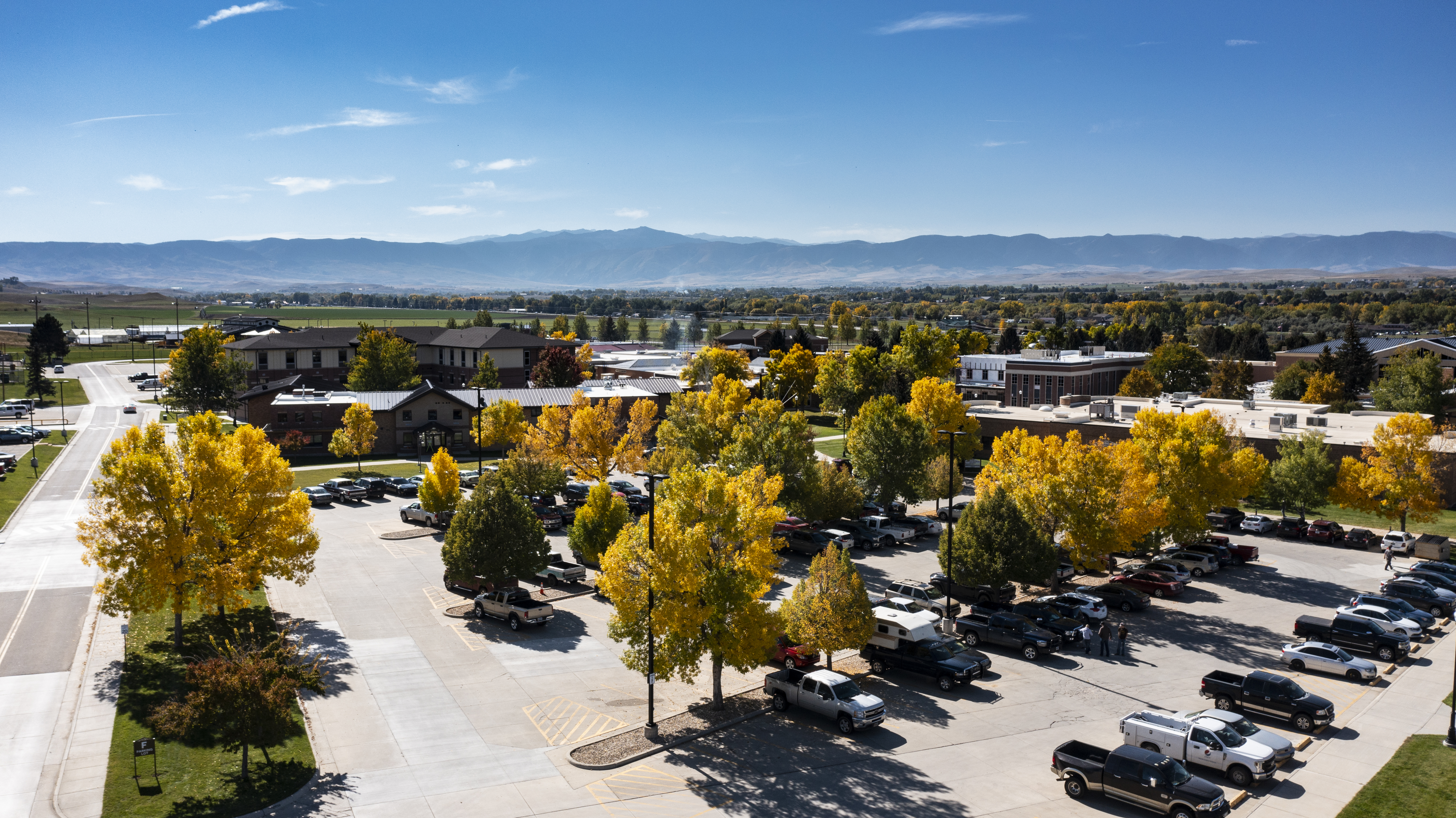
The Sheridan campus in October 2022

The Sheridan College campus features modern facilities, including a newly renovated library, advanced science labs, and student housing. The college provides multiple residential options from traditional resident halls to basic apartment living spaces complete with porches.

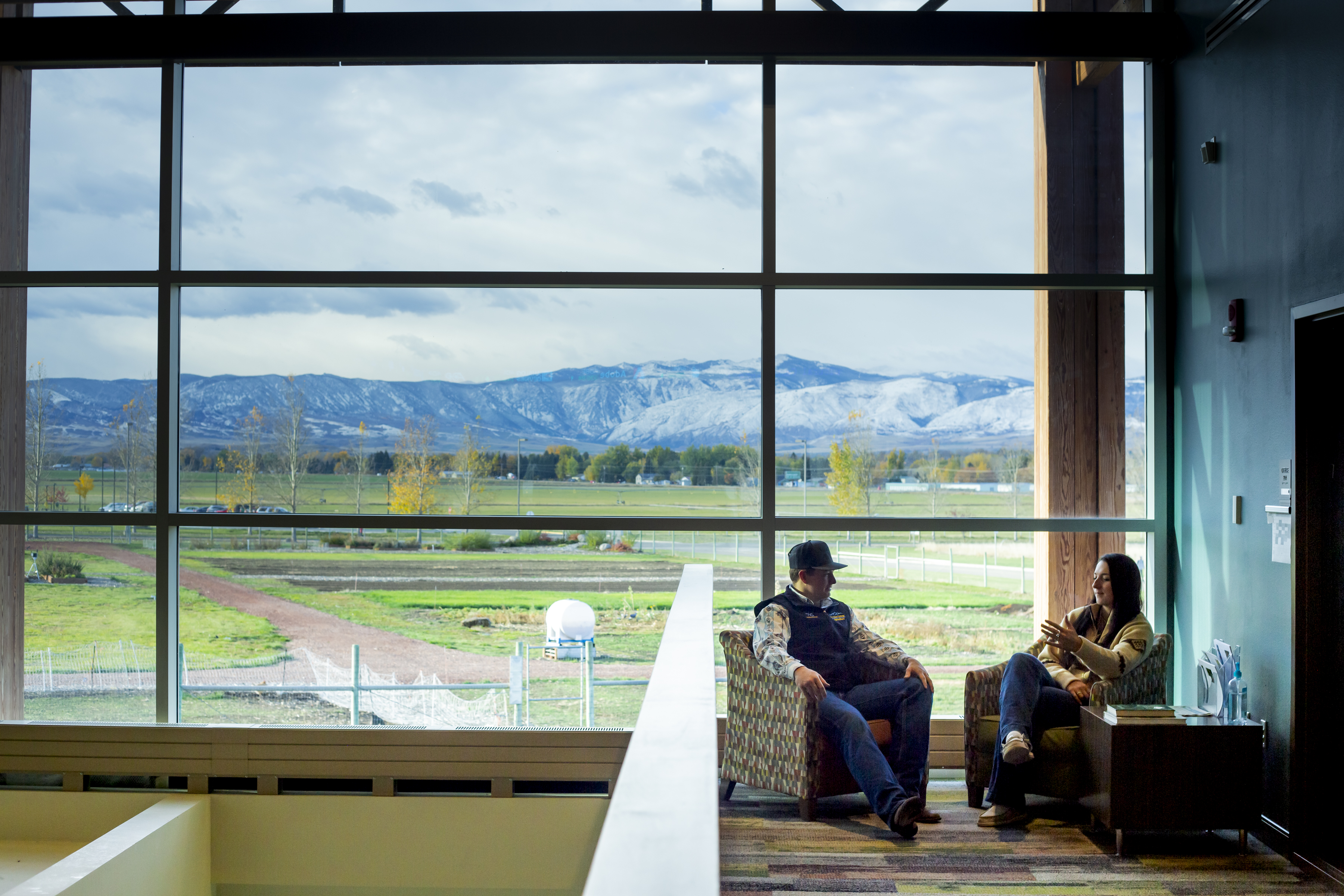
Two Sheridan students in the Mars Agricultural Center, 2022

== Academics ==
Sheridan College offers a diverse range of academic programs, including business, health sciences, construction technology, and a renowned Weekend Welding Program. The college has small class sizes, hands-on learning opportunities, and industry partnerships that support student success. Additionally, the college provides apprenticeships and workforce training programs tailored to local and regional industry needs. Students may also choose to enroll in career training, professional development courses, or vocational/technical programs.

== Athletics ==
Sheridan College is a member of the National Junior College Athletic Association (NJCAA), though it does not currently have competitive sports outside of the rodeo team, which is a member of the National Intercollegiate Rodeo Association (NIRA).

Its team colors are light blue and yellow. Its mascot is the Generals.
