= Arena ITSON =

Arena in Sonora, Mexico

Coordinates: 27.493624800031352°N 109.97431957365663°W

Arena ITSON is a 3,500-seat indoor arena located in Ciudad Obregón, Sonora. It was built in 2009 by the Sonora Institute of Technology (ITSON), for whom it was named and which also owns the Potros ITSON basketball team, which serves as the arena's anchor tenant.

The arena seats 3,500 for basketball, including eight luxury suites holding eight fans each and 32 boxes, including 28 holding 12 fans each and additional four holding 15 fans each. A sports bar overlooks the arena floor and provides a unique seating area with 200 seats providing a view of the action.

The arena is also used for concerts, boxing, lucha libre, graduation ceremonies and other special events. Artists that have played there include Alejandra Guzmán, Yuri, Enanitos Verdes, Banda MS, Gloria Trevi, Camila, Moderatto and David Bisbal.
