= Craig Williams Jr. =

American basketball player

Personal information
- Born: September 28, 1989 (age 37) St. Croix, U.S. Virgin Islands
- Listed height: 6 ft 8 in (2.03 m)
- Listed weight: 240 lb (109 kg)

Career information
- High school: St. Croix Central (St. Croix, U.S. Virgin Islands)
- College: Temple (2007–2010); TCU (2011–2012)
- NBA draft: 2012: undrafted
- Playing career: 2013–present
- Position: Power forward / center

Career history
- 2013–2014: Yeni Cami
- 2014–2015: Siarka Tarnobrzeg
- 2015–2016: Goes Montevideo
- 2016–2017: Ehime Orange Vikings
- 2017–2018: Sendai 89ers

Craig Williams Jr. (born September 28, 1989) is an American professional basketball player for Sendai 89ers in Japan.

== Career statistics ==
Legend
GP	Games played	GS	Games started	MPG	Minutes per game
FG%	Field goal percentage	3P%	3-point field goal percentage	FT%	Free throw percentage
RPG	Rebounds per game	APG	Assists per game	SPG	Steals per game
BPG	Blocks per game	PPG	Points per game	**Bold**	Career high

Year	Team	GP	GS	MPG	FG%	3P%	FT%	RPG	APG	SPG	BPG	PPG
2016–17	Ehime	55	31	20.8	.456	.363	.780	8.1	1.6	0.5	0.4	13.2
2017–18	Sendai	60	35	24.7	.424	.374	.800	8.7	2.8	0.6	0.6	13.8
