= Roberto Durán Arena =

Indoor sports arena in Panama

Coordinates: 9°02′09″N 79°28′10″W

- Arena Roberto Durán
- Interactive map of Roberto Durán Arena
- Full name: Roberto Durán Arena
- Former names: Gimnasio Nuevo Panamá
- Location: Panama City, Panama
- Capacity: 18,000 (Multi-purpose); 9,917 (Seating)
- Surface: Junckers Pro Complete 44 (22mm hardwood parquet)

Construction
- Built: 1970
- Opened: 1970
- Renovated: 2008-2009; 2025
- Cost: $15,497,985.26 (2008-09 renovations)
- Architects: Gustavo Díaz; Jorge Rodríguez; Julio Rovi
- Builders: RR Arquitectos; APROCOSA (2008-09)

Tenant
- Panama men's national basketball team

Roberto Durán Arena, originally known as Gimnasio Nuevo Panama, is an indoor sporting arena located in Panama City, Panama. The seating capacity of the arena is for a total of 9,917 spectators. The venue opened in 1970 with a seating capacity for more than 12,000 spectators. It hosts indoor sporting events such as basketball, boxing and volleyball. It is the host venue of the Panama men's national basketball team. The arena is named after former Panamanian boxer and local hero Roberto Durán.

The finals of the national basketball league Liga Profesional de Baloncesto (LPB) are played in the arena each year.

== FIBA-sanctioned matches hosted at the venue ==
=== 2019 FIBA Basketball World Cup qualification (Americas) ===
Date	Time (UTC-05)	Home	Result	Visitors	Round	Attendance
November 26, 2017	16:00	Panama	59–68	Argentina	First-round - Group A	-
June 26, 2018	20:15	Panama	82–62	Paraguay	First-round - Group A	-
February 26, 2018	20:45	Panama	86–75	Uruguay	First-round - Group A	-
September 17, 2018	20:00	Panama	48–78	United States	Second-round - Group E	-
November 29, 2018	20:30	Panama	76–65	Mexico	Second-round - Group E	1,500
December 2, 2018	17:00	Panama	70–71	Puerto Rico	Second-round - Group E	3,000

=== 2023 FIBA Basketball World Cup qualification (Americas) ===
The Panamanian team could only host 2 of its 3 first-round games due to the COVID-19 pandemic. During the November window, their opening match as the home team (against Venezuela) was played at the Estadio Obras Sanitarias in Argentina.

Date	Time (UTC-05)	Home	Result	Visitors	Round	Attendance
June 30, 2022	10:10	Panama	81–54	Paraguay	First-round - Group A	-
July 3, 2022	17:10	Panama	77-88	Argentina	First-round - Group A	10,000
August 29, 2022	19:10	Panama	50-106	Canada	Second-round - Group E	-
February 23, 2023	19:10	Panama	67-93	Dominican Republic	Second-round - Group E	3,745
February 26, 2023	19:10	Panama	88-66	Bahamas	Second-round - Group E	2,655

=== 2027 FIBA Basketball World Cup qualification (Americas) ===
Date	Time (UTC-05)	Home	Result	Visitors	Round	Attendance
27 November, 2025	20:40	Panama	60–93	Uruguay	First-round - Group D	-
27 February, 2026	20:10	Cuba (Note: Cuba's two scheduled home matches were moved to this venue, as they could not guarantee proper organization at home.)	81–84	Panama	First-round - Group D	6,523
2 March, 2026	19:00	Cuba	62–88	Uruguay	First-round - Group D	-
27 November, 2025	TBD	Panama	TBD	Cuba	First-round - Group D	TBD
27 November, 2025	TBD	Panama	TBD	Argentina	First-round - Group D	TBD
