= Liga Superior de Baloncesto (Nicaragua) =

- Founded: 2018; 8 years ago
- First season: 2018
- Country: Nicaragua
- Confederation: FIBA Americas
- Number of teams: 10
- Level on pyramid: 1
- International cup: BCL Americas
- Current champions: Jaguares UAM (1st title) (2026)
- Most championships: Real Estelí (6 titles)

The Liga Superior de Baloncesto (LSB), also known as the LSB Nicaragua, is the highest level of professional basketball in Nicaragua. The league was established in 2018 and started its inaugural season in February 2018 with six teams.

The champions of the LSB qualify directly for the regular season of the Basketball Champions League Americas, the Americas' premier continental competition.

== Current teams ==
As of the 2025 season, the LSB consists of the following teams:

- Brumas de Jinotega
- Costa Caribe
- Flecheros de Matagalpa
- Jaguares UAM
- Leones de Managua
- Real Estelí
- Tigres de Chinandega

== Champions ==
Season	Champions	Runners-up	Score	Ref.
2018	Real Estelí	Brumas de Jinotega	4–2	
2019	Real Estelí (2)	Brumas de Jinotega	3–0	
2020	Real Estelí (3)	Indigenas de Matagalpa	3–0	
2021	Real Estelí (4)	Brumas de Jinotega	3–1	
2022	Real Estelí (5)	Brumas de Jinotega	3–2	
2023	Costa Caribe (1)	Brumas de Jinotega	3–2	
2024	Real Estelí (6)	Jaguares UAM	3–2	
2025	Flecheros de Matagalpa (1)	Jaguares UAM	3–2	
2026	Jaguares UAM (1)	Brumas de Jinotega	3–2	

== Individual awards ==
Season	MVP	Finals MVP
2021	(Nicaragua) Jeremy Agosto (Cacique Diriangen)	(Puerto Rico) Christian Pizarro (Real Estelí)
