= Roger Muñoz =

Nicaraguan basketball player

Leones de la Alcaldia
- Position: Center
- League: Liga Nicaragüense de Baloncesto

Personal information
- Born: January 20, 1984 (age 42) Managua, Nicaragua
- Listed height: 6 ft 8 in (2.03 m)

Career information
- College: Trinity Valley Community College (2005-2007)
- Playing career: 2007–present

Career history
- 2014-15, 2016–present: Leones de la Alcaldia

Roger Muñoz (born January 20, 1984), is a Nicaraguan professional basketball player. He currently plays for the Leones de la Alcaldia club of the Liga Nicaragüense de Baloncesto in Nicaragua.

He represented Nicaragua men's national basketball team at the 2016 Centrobasket, where he played most minutes for his team.
