= Marvin Gray =

American serial killer (born 1954)

- Born: Marvin Gayle Gray; August 7, 1954; Princeton, Kentucky, U.S.
- Died: July 23, 2013 (aged 58); Colorado State Penitentiary, Cañon City, Colorado, U.S.
- Convictions: Second degree murder Aggravated robbery Attempted aggravated robbery
- Penalty: Life imprisonment

Details
- Victims: 3–41
- Span of crimes: 1971–1992
- Country: United States
- States: Kentucky; Indiana; Illinois; Colorado; Iowa; Tennessee; Nebraska; California
- Date apprehended: July 1992

Marvin Gayle Gray (August 7, 1954 – July 23, 2013) was an American serial killer. Being a powerlifter, Gray, while imprisoned, achieved incredible results in powerlifting, almost breaking world records. Since 1992, relying on his physical strength, he committed several rapes and murders of fellow inmates, which resulted in taking exceptional measures against Gray by putting him in a high-security prison's solitary confinement cell, restriction of movement within the prison and others.

In the 2000s, he was considered the most dangerous prisoner in the state of Colorado, being convicted of one murder and confirmed to have committed at least two others, personally confessing to killing 41 people across 8 different states from 1971 to 1992. However, the credibility of his testimony continued to be disputed until his death.

== Early life ==
Marvin Gayle Gray was born on August 7, 1954, in Princeton, Caldwell County in rural Kentucky. He was the seventh of 10 children. At the age of four, he began to suffer from panic attacks, and as a result he spent the next seven years taking medications containing methamphetamines. Since early childhood, he was attracted to work in the tobacco fields and labor discipline industries.

In 1965, his father suffered a heart attack, after which the main responsibilities for raising children and running the family's budget fell on the shoulders of his mother. At the same time, his behavior changed dramatically, with his grades and discipline plummeting. He was first arrested at the age of 12, and subsequently convicted of infiltrating into foreign property and theft, and was sent to an institution for juvenile offenders.

According to Gray, an informal hierarchy of minors reigned in the institution, where the youngest and most physically weak were subjected to sexual violence and humiliation. When he was released in 1968, he began his criminal career. On the first day of school, he was expelled for carrying deadly weapons and threatening school officials.

== Criminal career ==
In 1970, Gray broke into a neighbor's garage and stole a weapon from a car. Within a few days, he committed several thefts and assaults, threatening his victims with a pistol. He was eventually arrested and charged with robbery, burglary, and illegal possession of weapons. In 1971, at the age of 17, Gray was sentenced to five years in prison. He was transferred to Kentucky State Prison, a 100-year-old stone prison called "The Castle" in the city of Eddyville.

During his incarceration, Gray first took up powerlifting, developed a tattoo addiction, and became an ardent white supremacist. Released in early 1975, he weighed more than 100 kilograms (220 pounds) with a height of 1.90 metres (6 ft 3 in). At the insistence of his elder brother Eugene, he soon moved to Denver, where he found a job at the O'Neal Hotel, located in the city center. In the summer of 1975, Gray and his friend William Felder were arrested on charges of assaulting police officer James Datsman, whom they had shot.

Datsman had been investigating the murder of 26-year-old Joseph Didier, who had been killed earlier that day in the vicinity of the hotel. Found near the crime scene, Gray and Felder opened fire at the police officer. Datsman survived, and identified Felder as the shooter. At trial, Marvin Gray said that he shot, but the court considered the officer's testimony as a priority. Gray was accused only of theft and complicity of the crime and was sentenced to four years imprisonment, while Felder received 20 years. Subsequently, the ballistic examination showed that the bullets that killed Didier and injured Datsman were from the same weapon, but neither Gray nor Felder were charged with Didier's murder.

While in custody, according to the investigation, Gray committed his first crime against an inmate. Inmate David Cook was found beaten and strangled at the end of 1977 in his cell. Gray was identified as a suspect by several witnesses. Subsequently, these prisoners changed their testimonies, and even despite allegations that Gray threatened many in prison with physical violence, he was never charged with the murder of Cook.

In 1978, Gray was granted early parole and returned to Kentucky, where he met 17-year-old Sheila Olsbrook. They had a son in 1979. Gray beat Olsbrook during their relationship which only ended after his next arrest in 1979 for stealing a car. He was helped in this crime by accomplice William Purdue. On March 16, 1980, Gray, Purdue and another inmate named Jerry Keller escaped from prison. They hijacked a van, but quarreled along the way, as a result of which Gray beat Keller to death and disposed of his body in the city.

A few days later, Gray reached Denver, and was identified by acquaintances and soon rearrested. Traces of blood and a bloody screwdriver were found inside the van. Gray was interrogated but gave no explanation about the further fate of William Purdue. Investigators suspected Gray of killing his second accomplice, but Purdue's body was never found.

Gray escaped again and was once again arrested on August 11, 1982. He reappeared in Denver, where he met a girl named Joleen Sue Gardner on September 1. After she refused to have sex with him, Gray stabbed her 14 times, killing her. Gray was arrested and convicted in 1984 and sentenced to 16 years imprisonment.

In 1986 he was first charged with raping a cellmate, but the investigation was soon terminated due to lack of evidence that the act was violent. Gray received an administrative penalty and was transferred to a prison with more stringent conditions of detention. He was released on parole on January 18, 1991.

His freedom was extremely limited – he was obliged to find a job, had a probation officer appointed to him, and was prohibited from leaving the State of Colorado and living near places where children or adolescents congregated. Two days after his release, Gray got on a bus and left for Paducah, Kentucky to visit his relatives, thereby violating the conditions for early release. Having appeared in the city, Marvin sought out his family members, but they, fearing his temper and reputation and a warning by police to be vigilant, forced him to get on a bus a few days later and return to Colorado.

He did several odd jobs until 1992, when he again was arrested for burglary. Given the severity of the crime he committed in 1984 and the violation of the conditions of his parole, the court, based on judicial directives in effect at the time in the state of Colorado, Marvin Gray was given life imprisonment as a habitual offender. From this point on he was never released again.

== Aftermath ==
At the time, Marvin Gray weighed 280 pounds, and he continued to be heavily invested in powerlifting for several years. His official record in the bench press was 500 pounds, squatting 830 pounds and deadlifting 650. In November 1992, Gray was charged with the murder of another prisoner named Daniel Green, who was an informant in a drug case. Gray blamed Green's murder on two black cellmates, while five other inmates testified against Marvin. However, despite the fact that he was charged with first degree murder, Gray was never convicted of Green's murder. In early 1993, he was transferred to another prison.

On July 19, 1993, Gray beat and raped his 27-year-old cellmate. Less than a week later, he raped another inmate, James Mervyn, after which he was transferred to the Colorado State Penitentiary, a special high-security prison where exceptional measures were taken against him.

== Confessions ==
In 2000, Gray began confessing to murders he had never been accused of committing. By December 22, 2000, he confessed to 23 murders. He was transferred to the court, at which he threatened to kill his state-appointed lawyers. By March 2001, Gray had confessed to committing 31 murders and was interviewed by The Denver Post, in which he revealed the details of his criminal career.

He admitted to committing his first murder in 1971, when he was 17 years old. He also confessed to killing Joseph Didier 26 years earlier. He also said that he committed a series of seven murders allegedly in the states of Nebraska, Tennessee, Iowa, Kentucky and Illinois. He also claimed responsibility for the disappearance of his accomplice, William Purdue, with whom he had escaped from prison in 1980. According to Gray, he killed Purdue by stabbing him in the neck with a screwdriver and threw his body in a landfill.

He also confessed to the murder of a man in Indiana in 1982. When he was released for the last time, in January 1991, Gray alleged that he committed the most murders during that year than the entirety of his life. He described in detail the murder of a young man in the city of San Francisco, which he allegedly committed in 1991, and then threw the corpse into a dog kennel. According to Marvin's testimony, he also committed three murders in the summer of 1992, shooting Joseph Solise, killing a prostitute in Denver and killing another man. The last crime to which Gray confessed to was the murder of Daniel Green. Despite his extensive testimony, Gray was charged only with the murders of Didier and Solise, the latter being killed in 1992 in Denver during a robbery.

== Investigation ==
In 2001, Gray was required to undergo a polygraph test. The audit confirmed the truthfulness of his confessions in at least 18 murders, but soon the test results were invalidated due to the fact that Gray was taking medication.

At the same time, it became clear that a number of Gray's statements were not based in reality. In some instances, his confessions reflected a discrepancy in dates, geographic data and the seasons when the victims were allegedly killed, some of the killings and disappearances of people whom Gray could theoretically be related to while he was serving time in prison. In one case, he revealed the details of a double murder that was carried out in 1991 in Louisville, Colorado, but then, confused in his testimony, he said that he had lied.

A number of specialists, such as prison psychologist George Levy, said that Gray's statements could be pure fantasy. In Levy's opinion, Gray's behavior was motivated by social deprivation that resulted from spending eight years in solitary confinement, as well as a desire to make himself appear more powerful than he actually was. Gray was assigned a forensic medical examination, in which he was diagnosed with antisocial personality disorder.

In June 2002, he made another confession, this time admitting that in June 1992 he killed five women in his hometown of Princeton. Gray petitioned to be transferred to the crime scene, where he was ready to show the burial places of the victims. The true scale of his crimes remains unknown.

== Death ==
Marvin Gayle Gray died on July 19, 2013, from heart failure while imprisoned in the Colorado State Penitentiary, located in Cañon City.

== See also ==
- List of serial killers in the United States
