= Nicaragua men's national basketball team =

Nicaragua
- FIBA ranking: 72 ▲2 (3 March 2026)
- Joined FIBA: 1959
- FIBA zone: FIBA Americas
- National federation: Federación Nicaraguense de Baloncesto
- Coach: David Rosario

FIBA AmeriCup
- Appearances: 1

Central American Games
- Medals: Silver: 2017
Home	Away

The Nicaragua men's national basketball team is the national basketball team in Nicaragua. They have yet to appear in the FIBA World Cup. However, they made their debut at the FIBA AmeriCup as host in 2025.

It is managed by the Federación Nicaraguense de Baloncesto (FENIBALON).

Nicaragua's greatest accomplishment has been the silver medal at the 2017 Central American Games. Nicaragua won all games until they reached the final where they ceded to Panama 59-72, despite the support of 8,000 fans at the Polideportivo Alexis Argüello.

== Competitions ==
=== Olympic Games ===
Summer Olympic Games Record
Years	Positions	Pld	W	L
(Germany) 1936	Not an IOC member			
(United Kingdom) 1948	Not an IOC member			
(Finland) 1952	Not an IOC member			
(Australia) 1956	Not an IOC member			
(Italy) 1960	Did not qualify			
(Japan) 1964	Did not qualify			
(Mexico) 1968	Did not qualify			
(Germany) 1972	Did not qualify			
(Canada) 1976	Did not qualify			
(Soviet Union) 1980	Did not qualify			
(United States) 1984	Did not qualify			
(South Korea) 1988	Did not qualify			
(Spain) 1992	Did not qualify			
(United States) 1996	Did not qualify			
(Australia) 2000	Did not qualify			
(Greece) 2004	Did not qualify			
(China) 2008	Did not qualify			
(United Kingdom) 2012	Did not qualify			
(Brazil) 2016	Did not qualify			
(Japan) 2020	Did not qualify			
(France) 2024	Did not qualify			
(United States) 2028	To be determined			
(Australia) 2032	To be determined			
Total		111	65	46

=== FIBA World Cup ===
FIBA World Cup Record
Year	Result	Pld	W	L
(Argentina) 1950	Not a FIBA member			
(Brazil) 1954	Not a FIBA member			
(Chile) 1959	Not a FIBA member			
(Brazil) 1963	Did not qualify			
(Uruguay) 1967	Did not qualify			
(Socialist Federal Republic of Yugoslavia) 1970	Did not qualify			
(Puerto Rico) 1974	Did not qualify			
(Philippines) 1978	Did not qualify			
(Colombia) 1982	Did not qualify			
(Spain) 1986	Did not qualify			
(Argentina) 1990	Did not qualify			
(Canada) 1994	Did not qualify			
(Greece) 1998	Did not qualify			
(United States) 2002	Did not qualify			
(Japan) 2006	Did not qualify			
(Turkey) 2010	Did not qualify			
(Spain) 2014	Did not qualify			
(China) 2019	Did not qualify			
(Philippines) (Japan) (Indonesia) 2023	Did not qualify			
(Qatar) 2027	Did not qualify			
(France) 2031	To Be Determined			
Total		0	0	0

=== FIBA AmeriCup ===
FIBA AmeriCup Record
Year	Result	Pld	W	L
(Puerto Rico) 1980	Did not qualify			
(Brazil) 1984	Did not qualify			
(Uruguay) 1988	Did not qualify			
(Mexico) 1989	Did not qualify			
(United States) 1992	Did not qualify			
(Puerto Rico) 1993	Did not qualify			
(Argentina) 1995	Did not qualify			
(Uruguay) 1997	Did not qualify			
(Puerto Rico) 1999	Did not qualify			
(Argentina) 2001	Did not qualify			
(Puerto Rico) 2003	Did not qualify			
(Dominican Republic) 2005	Did not qualify			
(United States) 2007	Did not qualify			
(Puerto Rico) 2009	Did not qualify			
(Argentina) 2011	Did not qualify			
(Venezuela) 2013	Did not qualify			
(Mexico) 2015	Did not qualify			
(Argentina) (Colombia) (Uruguay) 2017	Did not qualify			
(Brazil) 2022	Did not qualify			
(Nicaragua) 2025	10th place	3	0	3
Total		3	0	3

=== Pan American Games ===
Pan American Games Record
Year	Result	Pld	W	L
(Argentina) 1951	Not a PASO member			
(Mexico) 1955	Not a PASO member			
(United States) 1959	Not a PASO member			
(Brazil) 1963	Did not qualify			
(Canada) 1967	Did not qualify			
(Colombia) 1971	Did not qualify			
(Mexico) 1975	Did not qualify			
(Puerto Rico) 1979	Did not qualify			
(Venezuela) 1983	Did not qualify			
(United States) 1987	Did not qualify			
(Cuba) 1991	Did not qualify			
(Argentina) 1995	Did not qualify			
(Canada) 1999	Did not qualify			
(Dominican Republic) 2003	Did not qualify			
(Brazil) 2007	Did not qualify			
(Mexico) 2011	Did not qualify			
(Canada) 2015	Did not qualify			
(Peru) 2019	Did not qualify			
(Chile) 2023	Did not qualify			
(Peru) 2027	To be determined			
(Paraguay) 2031	To be determined			
Total		0	0	0

=== Centrobasket ===
- 2012 – 10th
- 2016 – 8th

=== Central American Games ===
- 2017 – (silver)

== Team ==
=== Current roster ===
At the 2025 FIBA AmeriCup.

Nicaragua men's national basketball team roster
Players
Coaches

Pos.	No.	Name	Age – Date of birth	Height	Club	Ctr.
PG	0	Deo Downs	17 – 13 March 2008	1.70 m (5 ft 7 in)	Real Estelí	(Nicaragua)
PG	1	Joost West	17 – 5 July 2008	1.80 m (5 ft 11 in)	Free agent
PF	2	Kaleb Myers	20 – 7 October 2004	2.01 m (6 ft 7 in)	Jaguares de la UAM	(Nicaragua)
PF	3	Josmel Martínez	26 – 22 May 1999	1.98 m (6 ft 6 in)	Real Estelí	(Nicaragua)
SG	5	David Watson	18 – 17 April 2007	1.85 m (6 ft 1 in)	Free agent
C	11	Andy Pérez	25 – 23 September 1999	2.05 m (6 ft 9 in)	Real Estelí	(Nicaragua)
SF	15	Norchad Omier (C)	23 – 28 August 2001	2.05 m (6 ft 9 in)	Miami RedHawks	(United States)
C	23	Bartel López	35 – 27 October 1989	2.10 m (6 ft 11 in)	Real Estelí	(Nicaragua)
SF	24	Jared Ruiz	32 – 14 September 1992	1.89 m (6 ft 2 in)	Real Estelí	(Nicaragua)
SF	29	Francisco Garth	26 – 14 March 1999	1.85 m (6 ft 1 in)	Real Estelí	(Nicaragua)
C	34	Ponce Ferguson	23 – 29 August 2001	2.03 m (6 ft 8 in)	Real Estelí	(Nicaragua)
G	35	Jensen Campbell	27 – 17 February 1998	1.98 m (6 ft 6 in)	Real Estelí	(Nicaragua)

Head coach

- (Puerto Rico) David Rosario

Assistant coach(es)

- (Nicaragua) Stacey Acuña
- (Nicaragua) Chester Linarte
- (Nicaragua) Noel Makence

Legend

- (C) Team captain
- Club – describes last
  club before the tournament
- Age – describes age
  on 22 August 2025

=== Head coach position ===
- (Nicaragua) Angel Mallona – 2016, 2017
- (Puerto Rico) David Rosario – Since 2021

=== Past rosters ===
At the 2016 Centrobasket:

Nicaragua men's national basketball team roster
Players
Coaches

Pos.	No.	Name	Age – Date of birth	Height	Club	Ctr.
G	4	Vansdell Thomas	29 – 27 August 1986	1.77 m (5 ft 10 in)	Toros de Multiagro	(Nicaragua)
SF	6	Alvin Camacho	38 – 18 March 1978	1.93 m (6 ft 4 in)	Sinsa	(Nicaragua)
PF	7	Serbio Abea	38 – 29 January 1978	1.93 m (6 ft 4 in)	Toros de Multiagro	(Nicaragua)
G	8	Lee Saravia	27 – 22 March 1989	1.75 m (5 ft 9 in)	Leones de la Alcaldia	(Nicaragua)
PG	10	Eduardo Amaya	18 – 29 October 1997	1.75 m (5 ft 9 in)	Leones de la Alcaldia	(Nicaragua)
G	11	Daniel Tenorio	26 – 18 March 1990	1.77 m (5 ft 10 in)	Toros de Multiagro	(Nicaragua)
C	12	Roger Muñoz	32 – 20 January 1984	2.03 m (6 ft 8 in)	Leones de la Alcaldia	(Nicaragua)
F	15	Reynaldo Cruz	27 – 21 October 1988	1.85 m (6 ft 1 in)	Sinsa	(Nicaragua)
G	22	Denzel Moody	22 – 22 May 1994	1.85 m (6 ft 1 in)	Toros de Multiagro	(Nicaragua)
C	23	Bartel Lopez	26 – 27 October 1989	2.15 m (7 ft 1 in)	Toros de Multiagro	(Nicaragua)
F	35	Jensen Campbell	18 – 17 February 1998	1.98 m (6 ft 6 in)	Costa Caribe	(Nicaragua)
PG	77	Romario Ponce	21 – 14 January 1995	1.72 m (5 ft 8 in)	Leones de la Alcaldia	(Nicaragua)

Head coach

- (Nicaragua) Angel Mallona

Assistant coaches

- (Nicaragua) Jose Jarquin

Legend

- Club – describes last
  club before the tournament
- Age – describes age
  on 19 June 2016

At the 2017 Central American Games :

Nicaragua men's national basketball team roster
Players
Coaches

Pos.	No.	Name	Age – Date of birth	Height	Club	Ctr.
PG	4	Dalton Cacho	24 – 22 August 1993	1.90 m (6 ft 3 in)	Costa Caribe	(Nicaragua)
G	5	David Toruno	24 – 7 December 1992		Toros del Norte	(Nicaragua)
G	6	Carlos Gonzalez	37 – 2 January 1980	1.77 m (5 ft 10 in)	Bufalos de Managua	(Nicaragua)
PF	7	Serbio Abea	39 – 29 January 1978	1.91 m (6 ft 3 in)	Leones de Managua	(Nicaragua)
G/F	8	Noel McKenzie (C)	39 – 14 September 1978	1.92 m (6 ft 4 in)	Costa Caribe	(Nicaragua)
PF	9	Ramon Makensy	36 – 27 December 1980	1.93 m (6 ft 4 in)	Real Estelí Baloncesto	(Nicaragua)
SG	10	Dayton Cacho	26 – 22 November 1991	1.86 m (6 ft 1 in)	Costa Caribe	(Nicaragua)
C	12	Roger Munoz	33 – 20 January 1984	2.08 m (6 ft 10 in)	Leones de Managua	(Nicaragua)
SG	22	Denzel Moody	23 – 22 May 1994	1.91 m (6 ft 3 in)	Costa Caribe	(Nicaragua)
C	23	Bartel Lopez	28 – 27 October 1989	2.13 m (7 ft 0 in)	Correcaminos de Colon	(Panama)
PG	24	Vansdell Thomas	31 – 27 August 1986	1.85 m (6 ft 1 in)	Toros del Norte	(Nicaragua)
G	77	Romario Ponce	22 – 14 January 1995	1.80 m (5 ft 11 in)	Leones de Managua	(Nicaragua)

Head coach

- (Nicaragua) Angel Mallona

Assistant coaches

- (Nicaragua) Marlon Cuadra
- (Nicaragua) Rodrigo Valladares

Legend

- Club – describes last
  club before the tournament
- Age – describes age
  on 3 December 2017

== See also ==
- Nicaragua women's national basketball team
- Nicaragua national under-19 basketball team
- Nicaragua national under-17 basketball team
- Nicaragua national 3x3 team
