= CIBACOPA All-Star Game =

Annual basketball event in Mexico

- Status: Active
- Frequency: Annually
- Inaugurated: 2001
- Most recent: 2024
- Organizer: CIBACOPA

The CIBACOPA All-Star Game is an annual basketball event in Mexico, organised by the CIBACOPA (officially known as the Liga Chevron), one of the country's major basketball leagues. It was launched in 2001. Players like Gustavo Ayon, Larry Taylor, Tony Farmer, Jorge Camacho, Jahvon Blair, Akeem Scott, Davin White, Kavell Bigby-Williams, and Kevin Garnett's half brother Louis McCullough have featured in the event. The latter has won the MVP award a record-four times.

== List of games ==
Bold: Team that won the game.

Year	Date/Location	Team 1	Score	Team 2	MVP	Club
2001		Mexican Selection		USA Selection		
2002		Mexican Selection		USA Selection		
2003		Mexican Selection	119-**120**	USA Selection	(United States) Jeff Clifton	Bucaneros de Campeche
2004	March 20, Hermosillo Sonora	Sonora Team		Sinaloa Team		
2005	March 29, Convento de Guasave, Sinaloa	Sonora Team	113-**116**	**Sinaloa Team**	(United States) Ron Selleaze	Venados de Mazatlán
2006		**Sonora Team**	won	Sinaloa Team	(United States) Galen Robinson	Mineros de Cananea
2008	Gimnasio Municipal Manuel Lira Garcia	**North**	**116**-105	South	(United States) Dontae Truitt	Halcones de Ciudad Obregón
2009	April 6, Mazatlan	**North**	**109**-103	South	(United States) Derek Thomas	Mineros de Cananea
2010	April 25, Cananea	**North**	won	South	(United States) Louis McCullough	Frayles de Guasave
2012	April 27	**North**	**121**-111	South	(United States) Louis McCullough	Guindas de Nogales
2013	March 16, Manuel Lira Garcia Gym, Ciudad Obregon	**North**	**117**-112	South	(United States) Louis McCullough	Guindas de Nogales
2014	April 29	**North**	won	South	(United States) Louis McCullough (4)	Rayos de Hermosillo
2016	May 5	North	107-**126**	**South**	(United States) Jordan Williams	Frayles de Guasave
2017	May 14	**North**	**128**-115	South	(United States) Jeff Early	
2018	May 21	North	128-**137**	**South**	(United States) Eric Frederick	Frayles de Guasave
2022	May 21	North	133-**146**	**South**	(United States) Jordan Loveridge	Astros de Jalisco
2024	April 20, Arena ITSON, Ciudad Obregón	North	145-**150**	**South**	(United States) Jordan Allen	Pioneros de Los Mochis

== Slam-Dunk winners ==
Year	Player	Team
2003	(United States) Jeff Clifton	Bucaneros de Campeche
2005	(United States) Samuel Bowie	Frayles de Guasave
2006	(United States) Benny West	Ostioneros de Guaymas
2008	(United States) (Brazil) Larry Taylor	Lobos UAD de Mazatlán
2010	(United States) Derek Thomas	Leones Regios de Monterrey
2012	(United States) Derek Thomas (2) (United States) Darnell Hugee	Leones Regios de Monterrey; Tijuana Zonkeys
2013	(United States) Bernard Toombs	Garra Cañera de Navolato
2017	(Mexico) Manny Hernandez	Pioneros de Los Mochis
2018	(United States) Michael Bryson	Rayos de Hermosillo
2024	(United States) Alonzo Stafford	Venados de Mazatlán

== Three-Point Shoot Contest ==
Year	Player	Team
2003	(Mexico) Arturo Velazco	Petroleros de Ciudad del Carmen
2005	(United States) Samuel Bowie	Frayles de Guasave
2006	(Mexico) Gerardo Dorame	
2008	(Mexico) Edgar Soto	Paskolas de Navojoa
2010	(United States) Steve Monreal	Rayos de Hermosillo
2012	(Mexico) Luis López	
2013	(United States) Louis McCullough	Guindas de Nogales
2014	(United States) Louis McCullough (2)	Rayos de Hermosillo
2017	(United States) Steve Monreal	Rayos de Hermosillo
2018	(Mexico) Luis Ramírez	Tijuana Zonkeys
2024	(United States) Jordan Allen	Pioneros de Los Mochis

== Topscorers ==
Year	Player	Points	Team
2005	(United States) Ron Selleaze	37	Venados de Mazatlán
2008	(United States) Dontae Truitt	26	Halcones de Ciudad Obregón
2009	(United States) James Parker	27	Pioneros de Los Mochis
2010	(United States) Louis McCullough	35	Frayles de Guasave
2012	(United States) Louis McCullough	39	Guindas de Nogales
2013	(United States) Louis McCullough (3)	34	Guindas de Nogales
2016	(United States) Jordan Williams	34	Frayles de Guasave
2018	(United States) Eric Frederick	30	Frayles de Guasave
2022	(United States) Jordan Loveridge	47	Astros de Jalisco
2024	(United States) Jordan Allen	31	Pioneros de Los Mochis

== Players with most selections (2003-present) ==
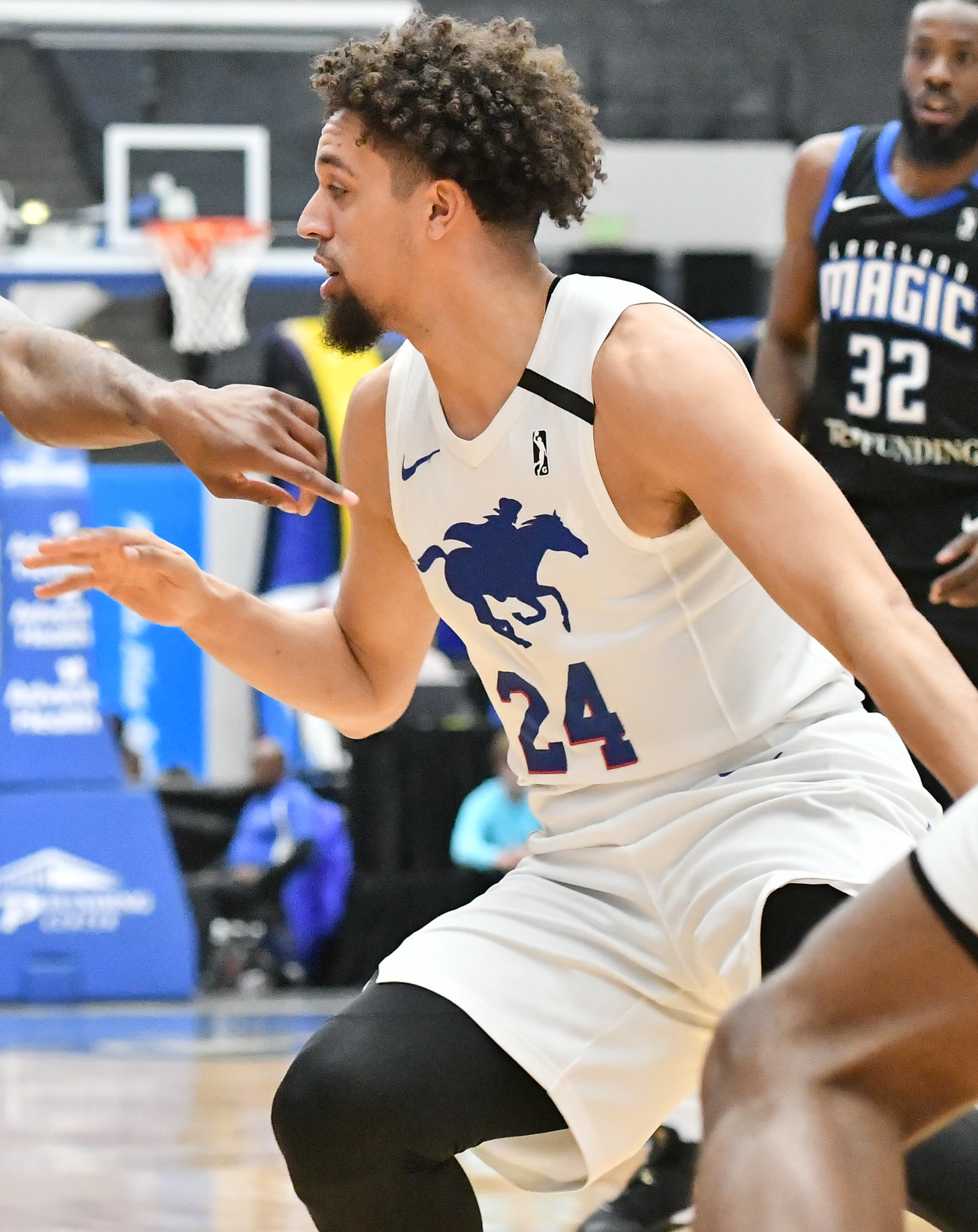
Michael Bryson featured in the 2024 All-Star Game and was named the MVP.

Player	All-Star	Editions	Notes
(United States) Louis McCullough	5	2008, 2010, 2012, 2013, 2014	4x MVP, 2x Three-point winner
(Mexico) Edgar Soto	3	2005, 2006, 2008	1x Three-point winner
(Mexico) Jorge Camacho	3	2010, 2017, 2024	
(United States) Sammy Yeager	3	2016, 2017, 2018	
(United States) Ron Selleaze	3	2005, 2008, 2012	1x MVP
(United States) Steve Monreal	3	2010, 2014, 2016	1x MVP, 1x Three-point winner

== See also ==
- Circuito de Baloncesto de la Costa del Pacífico
- LNBP All-Star Game
