= 2024 CIBACOPA season =

Mexican basketball season

- Season: 22
- Dates: 1 March – 18 May 2024; 23 May – 27 June 2024 (playoffs)
- Teams: 10
- TV partner: TVC Deportes

Regular season
- Top seed: Astros de Jalisco

Finals
- Champions: Rayos de Hermosillo
- Runners-up: Astros de Jalisco
- Finals MVP: (United States) Jimond Ivey (Hermosillo)

Statistical leaders
Points	(United States) Tony Farmer	23.1
Rebounds	(United States) Torren Jones	10.9
Assists	(United States) Joshua Webster	9.0

The 2024 CIBACOPA season was the 22nd season of the Circuito de Baloncesto de la Costa del Pacífico (CIBACOPA), one of the professional basketball leagues of Mexico. The regular season began on 1 March 2024 and ended on 18 May 2024. The 2024 CIBACOPA All-Star Game was held on 20 April at the Arena ITSON in Ciudad Obregón, Sonora. The playoffs began on 23 May. The CIBACOPA finals between the Astros de Jalisco and the Rayos de Hermosillo started on 22 June, with the Rayos winning the championship on 27 June, for a league record fourth title.

== Format ==
10 teams participated in the 2024 season, playing in one single group. The top eight teams qualify for the playoffs, which are three rounds in a best-of-7 format.

== Teams ==
=== Changes from the previous season ===
- The Ángeles de la Ciudad de México joined the league as an expansion team.
- The Frayles de Guasave returned to the league after a five-year hiatus, having last played in 2018.
Locations of teams in 2024 CIBACOPA

=== Venues and locations ===
Team	City	State	Arena	Capacity	Joined
Ángeles de la Ciudad de México	Mexico City	—N/a	Gimnasio Olímpico Juan de la Barrera	5,242	2024
Astros de Jalisco	Guadalajara	Jalisco	Arena Astros	3,509	2019
Caballeros de Culiacán	Culiacán	Sinaloa	Polideportivo Juan S Millán	1,810	2001 (Note: The Caballeros de Culiacán joined in 2001 but did not field a team in 2005 and 2006, only to return in 2007 in the LNBP. They rejoined CIBACOPA in 2008.)
Frayles de Guasave	Guasave	Sinaloa	Gimnasio Luis Estrada Medina	1,850	2001 (Note: The Frayles de Guasave joined in 2001 but last fielded a team in 2018. They rejoined CIBACOPA in 2024.)
Halcones de Ciudad Obregón	Ciudad Obregón	Sonora	Arena ITSON	3,500	2016
Ostioneros de Guaymas	Guaymas	Sonora	Gimnasio Municipal de Guaymas	1,200	2009
Pioneros de Los Mochis	Los Mochis	Sinaloa	Centro de Usos Múltiples de Los Mochis	3,000	2001
Rayos de Hermosillo	Hermosillo	Sonora	Arena Sonora	3,500	2009
Tijuana Zonkeys	Tijuana	Baja California	Auditorio Zonkeys	2,500	2010
Venados de Mazatlán	Mazatlán	Sinaloa	Lobodome	3,000	2015

=== Personnel ===
Team	Head coach	Captain
Ángeles de la Ciudad de México	(Mexico) Gustavo Quintero	(Mexico) Luis Andriassi
Astros de Jalisco	(Spain) Jorge Elorduy	(United States) Jerime Anderson
Caballeros de Culiacán	(Colombia) Bernardo Fitz-González	(Colombia) Michael Jackson
Frayles de Guasave	(Argentina) Lucas Zurita	(United States) Michael Henry
Halcones de Ciudad Obregón	(Argentina) Guillermo Narvarte	(United States) Tony Farmer
Ostioneros de Guaymas	(United States) Ben Sanders	(United States) Markel Crawford
Pioneros de Los Mochis	(United States) Derrick Alston	(United States) Anthony Johnson
Rayos de Hermosillo	(United States) Walter McCarty	(United States) Terrence Drisdom
Tijuana Zonkeys	(Mexico) Enrique Zúñiga	(United States) Joshua Webster
Venados de Mazatlán	(Argentina) Fernando Rivero	(Mexico) Eliseo Murrieta

== Transactions ==
=== Draft ===
The 2024 CIBACOPA draft was held on 17 January 2024. Each team received one pick in a single round, though three teams declined to select a player. The order of the draft was reverse order of finish in 2023 while the sole expansion team, the Ángeles de la Ciudad de México, received the first overall pick.

Round	Pick #	Team	Player	Position
1	1	Ángeles de la Ciudad de México	(Mexico) Luis Andriassi	G
1	2	Caballeros de Culiacán	(Colombia) Michael Jackson	G
1	3	Halcones de Ciudad Obregón	(United States) Joshua Parker	G
1	4	Pioneros de Los Mochis	–	–
1	5	Venados de Mazatlán	(Dominican Republic) Antonio Peña	F
1	6	Ostioneros de Guaymas	(Mexico) Juan Luis Ramírez	G/F
1	7	Frayles de Guasave	–	–
1	8	Tijuana Zonkeys	(Cuba) Reynaldo García	G
1	9	Rayos de Hermosillo	–	–
1	10	Astros de Jalisco	(Mexico) Isaac Gutiérrez	C

=== Coaching changes ===
Coaching changes
Team	2023 season	2024 season
Off-season
Caballeros de Culiacán	Froylán Verdugo (interim)	Bernardo Fitz-González
Halcones de Ciudad Obregón	Martin Knezevic	Guillermo Narvarte
Ostioneros de Guaymas	Pedro Carrillo	Ben Sanders
Pioneros de Los Mochis	Guillermo Vecchio	Derrick Alston
Tijuana Zonkeys	Claudio Arrigoni	Enrique Zúñiga
Venados de Mazatlán	Eric Weissling	Fernando Rivero
In-season
Caballeros de Culiacán	Bernardo Fitz-González	Gerardo Álvarez (interim); Juan Manuel Nardini
Venados de Mazatlán	Fernando Rivero	Gaston Essengué (interim); Derrick Allen

==== Off-season ====
- On 23 November 2023, the Pioneros de Los Mochis fired head coach Guillermo Vecchio after two seasons with the team.
- On 29 November 2023, the Pioneros de Los Mochis hired Derrick Alston as their head coach.
- On 14 December 2023, the Caballeros de Culiacán hired Bernardo Fitz-González as their head coach.
- On 20 December 2023, the Halcones de Ciudad Obregón hired Guillermo Narvarte as their head coach.
- On 22 December 2023, the Venados de Mazatlán hired Fernando Rivero as their head coach.
- On 9 January 2024, the Tijuana Zonkeys hired Enrique Zúñiga as their head coach.
- On 3 February 2024, the Ostioneros de Guaymas hired Ben Sanders as their head coach.

==== In-season ====
- On 17 March 2024, the Caballeros de Culiacán fired Bernardo Fitz-González. Gerardo Álvarez was named the interim head coach.
- On 19 March 2024, the Caballeros de Culiacán hired Juan Manuel Nardini as their head coach.
- On 26 March 2024, the Venados de Mazatlán fired Fernando Rivero. Gaston Essengué and Leroy Davis, the team's assistant coaches, were named the interim head coaches.
- On 3 April 2024, the Venados hired Derrick Allen as their head coach.

== Pre-season ==
- The Tijuana Zonkeys played the San Diego Sharks of The Basketball League (TBL) in the inaugural Border Bragging Rights Series – a cross-border home-and-home series – held on 10 and 17 February. The Zonkeys beat the Sharks, 102–88, in the first matchup at Mira Mesa High School in San Diego before beating the Sharks, 91–61, a week later at the Arena Zonkeys in Tijuana.
- The inaugural Copa de Básquetbol DIF Sinaloa was played from 19 to 20 February between the four teams from the state of Sinaloa: the Caballeros de Culiacán, the Frayles de Guasave, the Pioneros de Los Mochis, and the Venados de Mazatlán, with proceeds going to local wheelchair basketball teams. The Caballeros beat the Venados, 102–98, in their first matchup in Mazatlán, while the Venados earned an 86–81 victory over the Caballeros a day later in Culiacán. Notably, the latter was attended by the Governor of Sinaloa, Rubén Rocha Moya. Meanwhile, the Pioneros beat the Frayles, 94–92, in their first matchup in Guasave before beating the Frayles again, 91–71, a day later in Los Mochis.
- The second annual Copa Salsa Huichol was played from 22 to 24 February at the Mesón de los Deportes in Xalisco, Nayarit, with the six participating teams being the Ángeles de la Ciudad de México, the Astros de Jalisco, the Caballeros de Culiacán, the Frayles de Guasave, the Pioneros de Los Mochis, and the Venados de Mazatlán. The Ángeles beat the Astros, 85–70, in the championship final and Will Yoakum was named the tournament MVP.

== Regular season ==
=== Standings ===
==== First round ====
Pos	Team	Pld	W	L	PF	PA	PD	Pts
1	Astros de Jalisco	18	14	4	1646	1457	+189	10
2	Tijuana Zonkeys	18	14	4	1609	1489	+120	9
3	Ángeles de la Ciudad de México	18	13	5	1633	1552	+81	8
4	Rayos de Hermosillo	18	12	6	1574	1519	+55	7
5	Halcones de Ciudad Obregón	18	9	9	1592	1611	−19	6
6	Venados de Mazatlán	18	8	10	1605	1625	−20	5.5
7	Ostioneros de Guaymas	18	7	11	1577	1659	−82	5
8	Pioneros de Los Mochis	18	7	11	1565	1622	−57	4.5
9	Frayles de Guasave	18	4	14	1605	1709	−104	4
10	Caballeros de Culiacán	18	2	16	1497	1660	−163	3.5

Source: CIBACOPA, CIBACOPA

==== Second round ====
Pos	Team	Pld	W	L	PF	PA	PD	Pts
1	Tijuana Zonkeys	18	14	4	1709	1533	+176	10
2	Astros de Jalisco	18	13	5	1811	1660	+151	9
3	Rayos de Hermosillo	18	11	7	1640	1589	+51	8
4	Venados de Mazatlán	18	10	8	1610	1621	−11	7
5	Halcones de Ciudad Obregón	18	8	10	1690	1656	+34	6
6	Ostioneros de Guaymas	18	8	10	1714	1724	−10	5.5
7	Ángeles de la Ciudad de México	18	8	10	1710	1758	−48	5
8	Caballeros de Culiacán	18	7	11	1597	1674	−77	4.5
9	Pioneros de Los Mochis	18	7	11	1610	1687	−77	4
10	Frayles de Guasave	18	4	14	1733	1922	−189	3.5

Source: CIBACOPA, CIBACOPA

==== General table ====
Pos	Team	Pld	W	L	PF	PA	PD	Pts	Qualification
1	Astros de Jalisco	36	27	9	3457	3117	+340	19	Playoffs
2	Tijuana Zonkeys	36	28	8	3318	3022	+296	19	Playoffs
3	Rayos de Hermosillo	36	23	13	3214	3108	+106	15	Playoffs
4	Ángeles de la Ciudad de México	36	21	15	3343	3310	+33	13	Playoffs
5	Venados de Mazatlán	36	18	18	3215	3246	−31	12.5	Playoffs
6	Halcones de Ciudad Obregón	36	17	19	3282	3267	+15	12	Playoffs
7	Ostioneros de Guaymas	36	15	21	3291	3383	−92	10.5	Playoffs
8	Pioneros de Los Mochis	36	14	22	3175	3309	−134	8.5	Playoffs
9	Caballeros de Culiacán	36	9	27	3094	3334	−240	8	
10	Frayles de Guasave	36	8	28	3338	3631	−293	7.5	

Source: CIBACOPA

== Playoffs ==
The 2024 CIBACOPA playoffs were played between the top eight teams over three rounds from 23 May to 27 June. All rounds were a best-of-seven series; a series ended when one team won four games, and that team advanced to the next round. All rounds, including the CIBACOPA Finals, were in a 2–3–2 format with regards to hosting.

Quarterfinals
1	Astros	4
8	Pioneros	1
4	Ángeles	4
5	Venados	2
2	Zonkeys	4
7	Ostioneros	1
3	Rayos	4
6	Halcones	3

Semifinals
1	Astros	4
4	Ángeles	2
2	Zonkeys	2
3	Rayos	4

Finals
1	Astros	0
3	Rayos	4

=== Finals boxscore ===
22 June 2024
6:00 p.m.

Box Score

Astros de Jalisco 75, Rayos de Hermosillo 96
Scoring by quarter: 25–23, 20–29, 19–21, 11–23
Pts: Mikh McKinney 21; Rebs: Demitrius Conger 9 Asts: Mikh McKinney 5	Pts: Jeff Ledbetter 22; Rebs: Jeff Ledbetter 13; Asts: Jeff Ledbetter 11

Arena Astros, Guadalajara, Jalisco
Attendance: 3,506

23 June 2024
5:00 p.m.

Box Score

Astros de Jalisco 91, Rayos de Hermosillo 98
Scoring by quarter: 19–28, 20–24, 30–20, 22–26
Pts: Michael Bryson 18; Rebs: Kavell Bigby-Williams 9 Asts: Jerime Anderson, Demitrius Conger 6	Pts: Jimond Ivey 30; Rebs: Jeff Ledbetter 8 Asts: Jeff Ayres, Jeff Ledbetter 5

Arena Astros, Guadalajara, Jalisco
Attendance: 3,506

26 June 2024
9:00 p.m.

Box Score

Rayos de Hermosillo 96, Astros de Jalisco 94 (OT)
Scoring by quarter: 28–17, 12–21, 24–21, 16–21, Overtime: 16–14
Pts: Jimond Ivey 21; Rebs: Jeff Ayres 10; Asts: Jeff Ledbetter 11	Pts: Demitrius Conger 28; Rebs: Kavell Bigby-Williams 19; Asts: Mikh McKinney 10

Arena Sonora, Hermosillo, Sonora
Attendance: 2,000

27 June 2024
9:00 p.m.

Box Score

Rayos de Hermosillo 107, Astros de Jalisco 89
Scoring by quarter: 33–25, 24–15, 26–26, 24–23
Pts: Jimond Ivey, Jeff Ledbetter 22; Rebs: Jeff Ayres, Anthony Tarke 10; Asts: Jeff Ledbetter 11	Pts: Jordan Loveridge 25; Rebs: Lance Thomas 11; Asts: Mikh McKinney 5
Hermosillo wins series, 4–0

Arena Sonora, Hermosillo, Sonora
Attendance: 2,000

== Statistics ==
=== Individual statistic leaders ===
Category	Player	Team	Statistic
Points per game	(United States) Tony Farmer	Halcones de Ciudad Obregón	23.1
Rebounds per game	(United States) Torren Jones	Frayles de Guasave	10.9
Assists per game	(United States) Joshua Webster	Tijuana Zonkeys	9.0
Steals per game	(United States) Joshua Webster	Tijuana Zonkeys	2.1
Blocks per game	(United States) Raphiael Putney	Pioneros de Los Mochis	2.7
Minutes per game	(United States) Joshua Webster	Tijuana Zonkeys	35.9
FG%	(Brazil) Ruan Miranda	Venados de Mazatlán	57.0%
FT%	(Colombia) Michael Jackson	Caballeros de Culiacán	82.7%
3FG%	(Mexico) Moisés Andriassi	Astros de Jalisco	48.2%

Source: CIBACOPA

=== Team statistic leaders ===
Category	Team	Statistic
Points per game	Astros de Jalisco	96.7
Rebounds per game	Astros de Jalisco	35.1
Assists per game	Rayos de Hermosillo	21.4
Steals per game	Tijuana Zonkeys	8.2
Blocks per game	Astros de Jalisco	4.1
FG%	Astros de Jalisco	48.6
FT%	Halcones de Ciudad Obregón	76.9
3P%	Astros de Jalisco	37.9

Source: CIBACOPA

Note: Playoff statistics are included

== All-Star Game ==
The 2024 CIBACOPA All-Star Game was played on 20 April 2024 at Arena ITSON in Ciudad Obregón, Sonora. Zona Sur defeated Zona Norte, 150–145, with Jordan Allen earning All-Star Game MVP honors after recording 31 points, 11 rebounds, and five assists for the losing team.

Jordan Allen won the three-point shootout while Alonzo Stafford won the slam dunk contest. Additionally, pop singer Aleks Syntek closed the event with a live performance as part of his 3Decadas Tour.

Zona Norte
Player	Team
(United States) Jordan Allen	Pioneros de Los Mochis
(United States) Arinze Chidom	Tijuana Zonkeys
(Mexico) Jorge Camacho (Note: Replaced by Diego Willis)	Rayos de Hermosillo
(United States) Markel Crawford	Ostioneros de Guaymas
(United States) Tanksley Efianayi	Halcones de Ciudad Obregón
(United States) Tony Farmer	Halcones de Ciudad Obregón
(Canada) Jahvon Henry-Blair	Ostioneros de Guaymas
(United States) Jimond Ivey	Rayos de Hermosillo
(United States) Tomas Nuño	Halcones de Ciudad Obregón
(United States) Duby Okeke (Note: Replaced Joshua Webster)	Tijuana Zonkeys
(United States) Raphiael Putney	Pioneros de Los Mochis
(Mexico) Joel Reynoso	Tijuana Zonkeys
(United States) Joshua Webster (Note: Replaced by Duby Okeke)	Tijuana Zonkeys
(Mexico) Diego Willis (Note: Replaced Jorge Camacho)	Rayos de Hermosillo
Coaches: (Argentina) Guillermo Narvarte (Halcones de Ciudad Obregón); (Mexico) Enrique Zúñiga (Tijuana Zonkeys)

Zona Sur
Player	Team
(Mexico) Luis Andriassi	Ángeles de la Ciudad de México
(United Kingdom) Kavell Bigby-Williams	Astros de Jalisco
(United States) Michael Bryson	Astros de Jalisco
(United States) DaQuan Bracey	Ángeles de la Ciudad de México
(United States) Michael Henry	Frayles de Guasave
(Colombia) Michael Jackson	Caballeros de Culiacán
(Mexico) José Miguel Martínez	Caballeros de Culiacán
(United States) Nana Opoku	Ángeles de la Ciudad de México
(Mexico) Jorge de la Serna	Astros de Jalisco
(United States) David Sloan	Frayles de Guasave
(United States) Alonzo Stafford	Venados de Mazatlán
(United States) Robert Whitfield	Venados de Mazatlán
Coaches: (Spain) Jorge Elorduy (Astros de Jalisco); (Mexico) Gustavo Quintero (Ángeles de la Ciudad de México)

== Notable occurrences ==
- On 2 March 2024, Jordan Allen of the Pioneros de Los Mochis set the league record for most three-pointers made in a game by making 13 (out of 20) in a 98–90 win over the Ángeles de la Ciudad de México.
- On 12 April 2024, Wesley Saunders of the Ostioneros de Guaymas recorded a triple-double with 16 points, 14 rebounds, and 10 assists in a 104–90 win over the Astros de Jalisco.
- On 13 April 2024, Joshua Webster of the Tijuana Zonkeys recorded a triple-double with 19 points, 13 assists, and 10 rebounds in a 102–90 win over the Rayos de Hermosillo.
- On 17 May 2024, Jeff Ledbetter of the Venados de Mazatlán tied the league record for most three-pointers made in a game by making 13 (out of 18) in a 124–122 loss to the Frayles de Guasave.
- On 22 June 2024, Jeff Ledbetter of the Venados de Mazatlán recorded a triple-double with 22 points, 13 rebounds, and 11 assists in a 96–75 win over the Astros de Jalisco in Game 1 of the CIBACOPA finals.
