= Jorge Camacho (basketball) =

Mexican basketball player (born 1989)

No. 15 – Lobos de Puebla
- Position: Small forward
- League: LNBP

Personal information
- Born: 16 April 1989 (age 37) Hermosillo, Sonora, Mexico
- Listed height: 6 ft 7 in (2.01 m)
- Listed weight: 205 lb (93 kg)

Career information
- High school: Archbishop Riordan High School
- College: Eastern Kentucky University
- NBA draft: 2010: undrafted
- Playing career: 2010–present

Career history
- 2010: Mineros de Cananea
- 2011–2012: Rayos de Hermosillo
- 2012: Osos de Guadalajara
- 2013: Rayos de Hermosillo
- 2013: Pioneros de Los Mochis
- 2014: Rayos de Hermosillo
- 2014: Pioneros de Los Mochis
- 2015: Rayos de Hermosillo
- 2015: Pioneros de Los Mochis
- 2016: Rayos de Hermosillo
- 2016: Indios de Ciudad Juárez
- 2017: Rayos de Hermosillo
- 2017: Aguacateros de Michoacán
- 2018: Rayos de Hermosillo
- 2018: Leñadores de Durango
- 2019: Aguacateros de Michoacán
- 2020: Libertadores de Querétaro
- 2021: Rayos de Hermosillo
- 2021: Libertadores de Querétaro
- 2022: Rayos de Hermosillo
- 2022: Dorados de Chihuahua
- 2023: Rayos de Hermosillo
- 2023: Halcones de Xalapa
- 2024: Rayos de Hermosillo
- 2024: Halcones de Xalapa
- 2025: Rayos de Hermosillo
- 2025: El Calor de Cancún
- 2025: Halcones de Xalapa
- 2026: Apaches de Chihuahua
- 2026–present: Lobos de Puebla

Jorge Manuel Camacho Federico (born 16 April 1989) is a Mexican professional basketball player for the Apaches de Chihuahua of the LNBP, and the Mexican national team.

== Early years ==
Camacho was born on 16 April 1989 in Hermosillo, Sonora, Mexico. A baseball player in his youth, he took up basketball around the age of 13 at the suggestion of his physical education teacher who noticed his height. Camacho moved to the United States two years later at age 15. He initially enrolled at Alisal High School in Salinas, California, joining the basketball team as a 2.01 m (6 ft 7 in) tall "unheralded freshman."

== High school career ==
=== Freshman season ===
In his high school debut, Camacho led his team with 16 points in a 79–25 blowout victory over King City High School. He averaged 12.4 points per game on the season and guided the Alisal Trojans to a 19–6 record. However, they were upset by Menlo-Atherton High School in the first round of the CIF Central Coast Section Division I playoffs, with Camacho recording 17 points and 15 rebounds in the 80–67 defeat. He earned first-team all-Monterey Bay League honors and was a Monterey Herald all-Monterey County selection. That summer, Camacho trimmed his weight and developed his skills by joining one of the region's elite Amateur Athletic Union (AAU) teams, the Bay Area Hoosiers, under coach Phil Doherty.

=== Sophomore season ===
Camacho opened his sophomore campaign with an 18-point performance in a 60–49 win over Branham High School. He helped Alisal win the Tip-off Tournament later that month, scoring a game-high 20 points in their 68–61 victory over Mountain View High School in the championship game. On December 6, Camacho scored a game-high 32 points in an 87–51 win over King City High School. On December 16, he recorded 24 points, 13 rebounds, and five blocks in a 75–36 victory over the defending Division III state champion Santa Cruz High School in the semifinals of the Luis Scattini Memorial Tournament. The next day, Camacho scored 22 points to lead Alisal to a 68–36 win over Monte Vista Christian School in the championship game, earning tournament MVP honors for his performance. On December 29, he recorded 37 points and 20 rebounds to help the Trojans defeat Terra Nova High School, 75–65, in the John Steinbeck Classic third-place game.

Camacho averaged close to 21 points and 14 rebounds per game in non-league play and was considered a Monterey Bay League (MBL) MVP candidate as Alisal entered MBL play in January 2006 with a 15–3 record. He scored a game-high 22 points in their MBL opener, an 80–39 victory over Everett Alvarez High School. In their next game, Camacho scored a game-high 23 points, including the game-winning shot at the buzzer, to lead Alisal to a 45–44 win over Monte Vista Christian School. He followed this up with a 32-point, 15-rebound performance in a 59–55 victory over North Monterey County High School. On January 24, Camacho posted 21 points, 14 rebounds, and four blocks in a 60–55 overtime win over the defending MBL champions, Monterey High School. Two days later, he scored a game-high 34 points to go with 10 rebounds in a 74–62 loss to Seaside High School. On February 7, Camacho tallied 26 points and 17 rebounds to lead Alisal to a 62–47 victory over North Monterey County. In their final regular season game, he recorded 26 points and 10 rebounds in a 56–51 loss to Seaside. In the first round of the CIF Central Coast Section Division I playoffs, Camacho posted 37 points, 15 rebounds, and seven blocks in a 74–48 win over Evergreen Valley High School. The Trojans were eliminated in the quarterfinals by Bellarmine College Preparatory, with Camacho recording a team-high 24 points in the 53–44 defeat. Alisal finished the season with a record of 23–6.

As a sophomore, Camacho averaged 23.5 points and 15 rebounds per game, leading the county in both categories. He was recognized as the County Player of the Year by both the Monterey Herald and The Salinas Californian.

=== Junior season ===
Camacho transferred to Archbishop Riordan High School in San Francisco ahead of his junior season, enrolling in August 2006. Notably, a hearing was held that December at the CIF Central Coast Section offices in San Jose over questions of "undue influence" that led to the move. His role was described as that of "a complementary player... adjusting to a new school and trying to blend in" on the team. In his Riordan debut, Camacho scored a season-high 13 points in a 65–32 win over Kennedy High School. He averaged 6.5 points and five rebounds per game on the season, helping the Crusaders to a 28–5 record and a West Catholic Athletic League (WCAL) title. Riordan reached the CIF Central Coast Section Division III title game, losing to St. Ignatius Prep, before falling to Sacramento High School in the first round of the CIF NorCal Division III regional playoffs. Camacho scored 12 points against St. Ignatius, but was held to four points against Sacramento.

=== Senior season ===
Camacho stepped into a leading role as a senior in 2007–08 following the departure of two-time San Francisco Examiner Player of the Year Rob Jones, losing 25 lbs in the offseason in preparation for the increased playing time. He opened his senior season with a 16-point, 15-rebound performance in their 59–32 win over Woodside High School. Camacho posted 22 points and 20 rebounds in a 60–32 win over Mission High School two days later. Camacho averaged 18 points and 14.7 rebounds per game in non-league play. On January 8, 2008, he recorded 27 points, 10 rebounds, and four blocks in a 56–42 win over Serra High School, followed by a 36-point, 10-rebound performance in a 67–61 victory over Saint Francis High School. On January 15, Camacho tallied 22 points and 20 rebounds in a 57–51 win over Sacred Heart Cathedral Preparatory. On January 26, he recorded 26 points and 22 rebounds to help beat Valley Christian High School, 54–44, before tallying 28 points and 18 rebounds in a 63–61 win over Serra four days later. On February 1, Camacho recorded 30 points and 17 rebounds to lead the Crusaders to a 62–54 victory over Saint Francis.

Camacho averaged 22.3 points and 12.5 rebounds per game during the WCAL regular season, leading the league in both categories. Riordan was defeated by Archbishop Mitty High School in the WCAL tournament final. Camacho led Riordan to a CIF Central Coast Section Division III title, posting 20 points and 11 rebounds in their 60–39 victory over Sacred Heart Cathedral in the championship game. He helped the team reach the semifinals of the NorCal Division III regional playoffs, where he recorded 21 points and 11 rebounds in a 59–49 defeat to a Sacramento High team led by Chase Tapley. Camacho was named the San Francisco Examiner Player of the Year after leading the Crusaders to a 21–11 record on the season and averaging 19.1 points and 12.6 rebounds per game, including 21 double-doubles.

=== Recruiting ===
Although he was not a highly ranked recruit, Camacho received interest from schools such as Eastern Kentucky, Denver, Portland State, Sacramento State, and Weber State. After making an official visit to Eastern Kentucky, he accepted their offer and filled their final roster spot.

== College career ==
Camacho played 31 games for the Eastern Kentucky Colonels as a freshman in 2008–09. He made his collegiate debut on November 14, 2008, recording no stats in two minutes of action against Florida International. Camacho first scored in the double digits on December 9, recording 10 points to go with a season-high eight rebounds in a 93–50 win over Covenant College. On January 20, 2009, he posted 14 points and a team-high seven rebounds in a 71–68 victory over Chicago State. Four days later, Camacho tallied 15 points and a team-high seven rebounds in a 68–64 defeat to Morehead State. He set new career highs in scoring in back-to-back games and was recognized as the Ohio Valley Conference (OVC) Freshman of the Week for his performances.

Jorge really grew as a player. When we recruited him we told him we expected him to play as a freshman. I never would have thought that he would score six points a game and kind of be a go-to guy for us in the post.

— His college head coach, Jeff Neubauer, reflecting on Camacho's freshman season.

On February 5, 2009, Camacho recorded 15 points and a team-high seven rebounds in an 80–73 win over Tennessee Tech. Two days later, he posted 11 points and four rebounds in a 75–70 loss to Jacksonville State, earning OVC Freshman of the Week honors for the second time that season. On February 21, Camacho led the Colonels with a career-high 17 points in a 73–51 victory over Ohio. He averaged 6.3 points and three rebounds on 56.7 percent shooting in 14.6 minutes per game during his only collegiate season. Camacho participated in off-season workouts with the team, even drawing praise from head coach Jeff Neubauer for improvements in his shooting. However, due to immigration issues, he was unable to re-enter the U.S. from Mexico for his sophomore season, effectively ending his college career.

== Professional career ==
In 2010, he began his participation in one of the largest basketball leagues in Mexico, CIBACOPA, with the Mineros de Cananea team.

He is a key player for the Rayos de Hermosillo, his hometown team in the CIBACOPA. In 2023, he joined Halcones de Xalapa.

== National team career ==
In August and September 2023, he was a member of the Mexican national team that participated in the 2023 FIBA World Cup held in Asia, finishing in 25th place.
