= Raúl Delgado (basketball) =

Mexican basketball player (born 1991)

No. 16 – Halcones de Ciudad Obregón
- Position: Shooting guard
- League: CIBACOPA

Personal information
- Born: 6 January 1991 (age 35) Chihuahua City, Chihuahua, Mexico
- Listed height: 6 ft 2 in (1.88 m)
- Listed weight: 200 lb (91 kg)

Career information
- College: BYU (2012–13); MSU Denver (2013–14)
- Playing career: 2014–present

Career history
- 2014: Pioneros de Los Mochis
- 2014: Mineros de Caborca
- 2014: Pioneros de Quintana Roo
- 2016: Ostioneros de Guaymas
- 2016–2018: Halcones de Ciudad Obregón
- 2016: Abejas de León
- 2019: Mexico City Capitanes
- 2020: Dorados de Chihuahua
- 2021–2022: Halcones de Ciudad Obregón
- 2021: Gimnasia Indalo
- 2021–2023: Halcones de Xalapa
- 2024–2025: El Calor de Cancún
- 2026: Apaches de Chihuahua
- 2026–present: Halcones de Ciudad Obregón

Raúl Eduardo Delgado Cruz (born 6 January 1991) is a Mexican professional basketball player.

== Career ==
Delgado made his debut in the 2014 season with the Pioneros de Los Mochis to play in the CIBACOPA. In 2014 he made his debut in LNBP with Pioneros de Quintana Roo, in 2019 he signed with Mexico City Capitanes. In the season 2021 he played with Gimnasia Indalo. In 2021 he signed with Halcones de Xalapa. In 2023 he became the first player in the history of El Calor de Cancún.
