= Raphiael Putney =

American basketball player (born 1990)

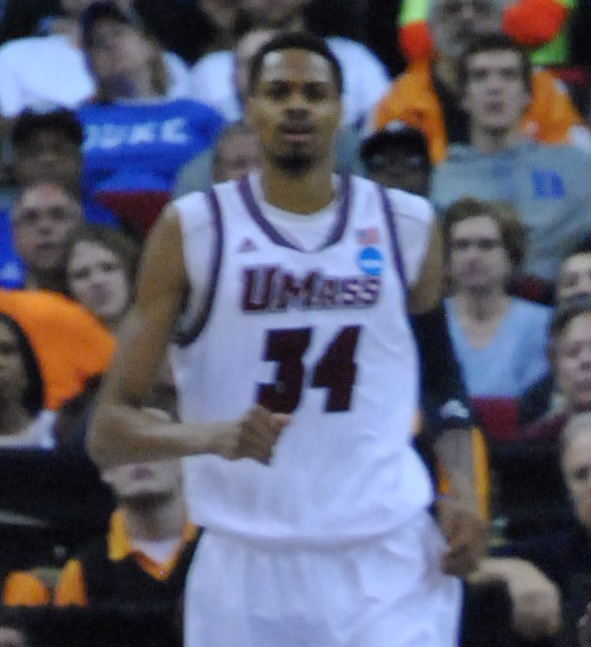
- Putney playing for UMass

No. 34 – Rivers Hoopers
- Position: Power forward
- League: BAL; Nigerian Premier League

Personal information
- Born: April 21, 1990 (age 36) Fairmont, West Virginia, U.S.
- Listed height: 6 ft 10 in (2.08 m)
- Listed weight: 215 lb (98 kg)

Career information
- High school: Woodbridge (Lake Ridge, Virginia)
- College: UMass (2010–2014)
- NBA draft: 2014: undrafted
- Playing career: 2014–present

Career history
- 2014–2015: Rio Grande Valley Vipers
- 2015: Al-Ittihad Jeddah
- 2015: Perth Redbacks
- 2015: NS Matrix
- 2015–2016: Rio Grande Valley Vipers
- 2016: Guaiqueríes de Margarita
- 2016–2017: Pasta Reggia Caserta
- 2017: Élan Chalon
- 2017–2018: Erie BayHawks
- 2018: Atléticos de San Germán
- 2018–2019: Sioux Falls Skyforce
- 2019: Scafati Basket
- 2019–2020: Atomerőmű SE
- 2020: Team Cali
- 2021: Fort Wayne Mad Ants
- 2021: Iowa Wolves
- 2021: San Lázaro
- 2021: Reales de La Vega
- 2021–2022: Maccabi Haifa
- 2022: Cape Town Tigers
- 2023: Taichung Suns
- 2023: Aguada
- 2023: Reales de La Vega
- 2023: Homenetmen Beirut
- 2024: CDP Club Domingo Paulino
- 2024: Pioneros de Los Mochis
- 2024: Reales de La Vega
- 2024: Al-Fateh
- 2025: Indomables de Ciudad Juárez
- 2025: Pioneros de Delicias
- 2025: Rivers Hoopers
- 2025: Dar City
- 2026: Dorados de Chihuahua
- 2026–present: Rivers Hoopers

Career highlights
- Nigerian Premier League champion (2026); CIBACOPA All-Star (2024); CIBACOPA blocks leader (2024); NBA D-League All-Star (2016); Seri Mutiara Champions Cup champion (2015)
- Stats at Basketball Reference

Raphiael Rashad Putney (born April 21, 1990) is an American professional basketball player for the Rivers Hoopers of the Basketball Africa League (BAL), and the Nigerian Premier League. He played college basketball for the UMass Minutemen.

== High school career ==
Putney attended Woodbridge High School in Lake Ridge, Virginia, where he played basketball for coach Chad Anderson, averaging 9.0 points per game as a junior.

== College career ==
Putney played college basketball for the UMass Minutemen playing 131 games and starting 86 overall, with averages of 7.8 points, 4.8 rebounds, 1.2 assists, 0.7 steals and 1.2 blocks. His best year was as a junior, with averages of 10.1 points, 5.8 rebounds and 1.3 assists.

== Professional career ==
=== Rio Grande Valley Vipers (2014–2015) ===
After going undrafted in the 2014 NBA draft, Putney was acquired by the Rio Grande Valley Vipers of the NBA Development League on November 2, 2014, after a successful tryout. On November 14, he made his professional debut in a 112–101 loss to the Idaho Stampede, recording two points, three rebounds, one assist and three blocks in 17 minutes. He was deactivated twice by the Vipers during the 2014–15 season, and subsequently played in just 24 games, averaging 6.3 points and 2.5 rebounds per game.

=== Al-Ittihad Jeddah (2015) ===
In April 2015, Putney moved to Saudi Arabia where he joined Al-Ittihad Jeddah for the remainder of the season.

=== Perth Redbacks (2015) ===
On June 13, 2015, he signed with the Perth Redbacks for the rest of the 2015 State Basketball League season. In nine games, he averaged 19.3 points, 10.9 rebounds, 2.0 assists and 2.6 blocks per game.

Later that year, he joined Malaysian club NS Matrix and helped them win the 2015 Seri Mutiara Champions Cup. He also earned MVP honors for the championship game.

=== Second stint with Rio Grande Valley (2015–2016) ===
On November 2, 2015, Putney returned to the Rio Grande Vipers for the 2015–16 season and had a marked improvement in his second campaign for the team. On January 12, 2016, he was named NBA D-League Performer of the Week for games played Monday, January 4 through Sunday, January 10. Putney led the Vipers to a 2–1 week while averaging 28.3 points (third in the league) on 47 percent shooting (29-of-62) to go with a league-leading 15.7 rebounds and 3.7 blocks (third). On January 29, he was named in the West All-Star team for the 2016 NBA D-League All-Star Game. On March 31, he was suspended for five games without pay for violating the terms of the league's Anti-Drug Program. The suspension ended his season with the Vipers, and in 48 games for the team, he averaged 17.1 points, 8.1 rebounds, 1.9 assists, 1.1 steals and 2.3 blocks per game.

=== Guaiqueríes de Margarita (2016) ===
On April 16, 2016, Putney signed with Guaiqueríes de Margarita of Venezuela for the rest of the 2015–16 LPB season. That night, he made his debut for the club in a 91–61 quarter-final Game 2 loss to Bucaneros de La Guaira, recording nine points, five rebounds and one block in 23 minutes. Guaiqueríes went on to lose the series 4–3. In six games for the club, Putney averaged 15.0 points and 4.8 rebounds per game.

=== Juvecaserta Basket (2016–2017) ===
On August 5, 2016, Putney signed with Juvecaserta Basket of the Italian Serie A.

=== Erie BayHawks (2017–2018) ===
On July 14, 2017, Putney played two summer league games for the Minnesota Timberwolves and Phoenix Suns. At 2pm PT, he went 0-5 shooting and grabbed a rebound in 4 minutes of game time for the Timberwolves against Washington Wizards and three hours later, after he was acquired by the Suns, where he scored 7 points, 7 rebounds and 2 blocks in 18 minutes of game time against the Sacramento Kings. On November 10, he signed with the Erie BayHawks of the NBA G League.

=== Atléticos de San Germán (2018) ===
On April 17, 2018, Atléticos de San Germán of the Baloncesto Superior Nacional had announced their signing with Putney.

=== Sioux Falls Skyforce (2018–2019) ===
Putney signed with the Miami Heat on October 11, 2018. He was waived on October 13. Putney was subsequently added to the roster of the Sioux Falls Skyforce.

=== Scafati Basket (2019) ===
On July 20, 2019, Putney signed with Scafati Basket of the Italian Serie A2 Basket League.

=== Atomerőmű SE (2019–2020) ===
On November 28, 2019, he has signed with Atomerőmű SE of the Nemzeti Bajnokság I/A.

=== Fort Wayne Mad Ants (2021) ===
On February 9, 2021, the Fort Wayne Mad Ants of the NBA G League announced that they had acquired Putney from the available pool of players. He made his debut for the team on February 11, 2021, but was later waived by the Mad Ants on February 17.

=== Iowa Wolves (2021) ===
On February 25, 2021, the Iowa Wolves announced that they had acquired Putney from the available pool of players and he made his debut on February 26.

=== San Lázaro (2021) ===
At the 2021 Torneo Superior de Baloncesto, Putney's San Lázaro finished as vice Champion. In the last game, Putney had 18 points with nine rebounds.

=== Reales de La Vega (2021) ===
On June 26, 2021, Putney signed with Reales de La Vega of the Liga Nacional de Baloncesto.

=== Maccabi Haifa (2021–2022) ===
Putney signed with Maccabi Haifa of the Israeli National League in October 2021.

=== Cape Town Tigers (2022) ===
In August 2022, Putney played for the Cape Town Tigers and helped them win their second consecutive national championship. He scored a game-high 27 points in the third and final game.

=== Taichung Suns (2023) ===
On February 24, 2023, Putney signed with Taichung Suns of the T1 League. On March 8, Taichung Suns cancelled the registration of Putney's playership. On March 9, Taichung Suns terminated the contract relationship with Putney.

=== Pioneros de Los Mochis (2024) ===
In March 2024, Putney signed with the Pioneros de Los Mochis of the Circuito de Baloncesto de la Costa del Pacífico (CIBACOPA). He was named a CIBACOPA All-Star. Putney averaged a league-leading 2.7 blocks per game.

=== Rivers Hoopers (2025) ===
On March 23, 2025, Putney joined Nigerian team Rivers Hoopers for the 2025 BAL season.

=== Dar City (2025–present) ===
Putney joined the Tanzanian champions Dar City for the 2026 BAL qualification. On October 17, 2025, he set a new-competition record for most points in a game, as he scored 55 points in a 102–50 group stage win over Djabal.
