= Pascal Meurs =

Belgian basketball coach

Ángeles de la Ciudad de México
- Position: Head coach
- League: CIBACOPA

Personal information
- Born: February 16, 1980 (age 46) Belgium

Career history

Coaching
- 2025: Mexico City Angels
- 2025: Panteras de Aguascalientes

Pascal Meurs (born 16 February 1980) is a Belgian professional basketball coach who is currently the head coach of the Ángeles de la Ciudad de México (Mexico City Angels) of CIBACOPA.

== Coaching career ==
Meurs has over 20 years of experience in international basketball as a coach in Belgium, France, and Spain.

Meurs was part of the coaching staff for the Belgian Basketball Federation, helping the team prepare for EuroBasket and the Basketball World Cup Qualifiers. He was also previously head coach of the Valencia Basket Under-16 team.

On January 14, 2025, Meurs was named the new head coach of the Mexico City Angels.
