= Kerry Woodson =

American baseball player (born 1969)

- Pitcher
- Born: May 18, 1969 (age 57); Jacksonville, Florida, U.S.
- Batted: Right Threw: Right

MLB debut
- July 19, 1992, for the Seattle Mariners

Last MLB appearance
- September 12, 1992, for the Seattle Mariners

MLB statistics
- Win–loss record: 0–1
- Earned run average: 3.29
- Strikeouts: 6

CPBL statistics
- Win–loss record: 0–0
- Earned run average: 7.11
- Strikeouts: 0
- Stats at Baseball Reference

Teams
- Seattle Mariners (1992); Brother Elephants (1999)

Walter Browne "Kerry" Woodson IV (born May 18, 1969) is an American former professional baseball pitcher. He played in Major League Baseball for the Seattle Mariners in 1992.

Woodson pitched at Carmel High School in Carmel, California, where he trained with pitching coach Guy Dubets. He was named the Mission Trail Athletic League MVP in 1987. He then attended San Jose City College, where he converted from shortstop to pitcher. He went 12–0 with a 1.79 earned run average in 1989 and was named the best pitcher in the Golden Gate Conference. He was college teammates with Scott Erickson.

The Mariners drafted Woodson in the 29th round (747th overall) of the 1988 MLB draft. He made his minor league debut with the Bellingham Mariners in 1989 and was promoted to the Single-A affiliate San Bernardino Spirit the following season., where he was a California League All-Star. He reached Double-A in 1991, then Triple-A and the majors in 1992.

Woodson made his MLB debut on July 19, 1992 against the Toronto Blue Jays. He was ejected from a game on July 21 after hitting Skeeter Barnes of the Detroit Tigers in the back with the first pitch, leading Barnes to charge the mound and start a bench-clearing brawl. He pitched in eight games for Seattle in 1992.

Woodson missed the 1993 season, undergoing Tommy John surgery, then pitched in the minors in 1994. He returned to the minors in 1998 with the Colorado Springs Sky Sox. In 1999, he pitched in Taiwan for the Brother Elephants of the Chinese Professional Baseball League (CPBL) as well as the Saraperos de Saltillo of the Mexican Baseball League and in the Atlantic League. He returned to the Atlantic League in 2000.

After his playing career, Woodson moved to Naples, Florida. He is married and has three children. He coaches youth baseball.
