= Diego Willis =

Mexican basketball player (born 1999)

No. 3 – Lobos de Puebla
- Position: Point guard
- League: LNBP

Personal information
- Born: May 11, 1999 (age 27) Hermosillo, Mexico
- Listed height: 6 ft 4 in (1.93 m)
- Listed weight: 180 lb (82 kg)

Career information
- High school: Canarias Basketball Academy (Tenerife, Spain)
- College: NJIT (2018–2021); Stephen F. Austin (2021–2022)
- Playing career: 2022–present

Career history
- 2022–2023: Libertadores de Querétaro
- 2023: Santos de San Luis
- 2024: Rayos de Hermosillo
- 2024: Fuerza Regia de Monterrey
- 2025: Ángeles de la Ciudad de México
- 2025–2026: Astros de Jalisco
- 2026–present: Lobos de Puebla

Career highlights
- CIBACOPA champion (2024); CIBACOPA All-Star (2024); LNBP Rookie of the Year (2022)
Medals
Men's basketball
Representing Mexico
FIBA AmeriCup
Bronze medal – third place	2017 Argentina

Diego Armando Willis Orozco (born May 11, 1999) is a Mexican professional basketball player for the Astros de Jalisco of the CIBACOPA. He played college basketball for the NJIT Highlanders and the Stephen F. Austin Lumberjacks. He has played for the Mexico men's national basketball team.

== Youth career ==
Due to an impressive performance at the "200 mil Estudiantes por México" youth tournament, Willis received a scholarship to play at the Canarias Basketball Academy in Spain in 2014. He averaged 18.2 points and 4.6 rebounds per game in his final year. He signed a National Letter of Intent to go to NJIT.

== College career ==
As a junior, Willis averaged 5.9 points and 3.3 rebounds per game. Following the season, he transferred to Stephen F. Austin.

== Professional career ==
Willis joined the Libertadores de Querétaro of the Mexican Liga Nacional de Baloncesto Profesional (LNBP) after coming out of college. He made his professional debut in a 93–80 loss to the Fuerza Regia de Monterrey on July 22. Willis was named the 2022 Rookie of the Year.

As a member of the Rayos de Hermosillo, Willis was named a CIBACOPA All-Star in 2024.

== National team career ==
Willis was first called up to the Mexico national team for the 2017 FIBA AmeriCup. Willis represented Mexico in the 2019 Pan American Games.

== Career statistics ==
Legend
GP	Games played	GS	Games started	MPG	Minutes per game
FG%	Field goal percentage	3P%	3-point field goal percentage	FT%	Free throw percentage
RPG	Rebounds per game	APG	Assists per game	SPG	Steals per game
BPG	Blocks per game	PPG	Points per game	**Bold**	Career high

=== College ===
Year	Team	GP	GS	MPG	FG%	3P%	FT%	RPG	APG	SPG	BPG	PPG
2018–19	NJIT	28	1	9.7	.322	**.310**	.333	1.5	.6	.2	.0	1.9
2019–20	NJIT	**30**	2	14.5	**.330**	.280	.650	1.8	.8	.4	**.1**	3.5
2020–21	NJIT	19	**5**	**21.6**	**.330**	.250	**.795**	**3.3**	**.9**	**.6**	.0	**5.9**
Career		77	8	14.5	.328	.277	.726	2.1	.8	.4	.1	3.5

== Personal life ==
His father, Rafael, represented Mexico in Basketball at the 1991 Pan American Games while his mother was a volleyball player.
