= Darnell Martin (basketball) =

American professional basketball player

No. 0 – Pioneros de Los Mochis
- Position: Power forward
- League: CIBACOPA

Personal information
- Born: October 16, 1991 (age 35) West Covina, California
- Listed height: 6 ft 6 in (1.98 m)
- Listed weight: 230 lb (104 kg)

Career information
- High school: Nogales (La Puente, California)
- College: Grayson (2011–2012); Mt. San Antonio (2012–2013); Cal State Dominguez Hills (2013–2015)
- NBA draft: 2015: undrafted
- Playing career: 2015–present

Career history
- 2016-2017: Citybasket Recklinghausen
- 2017-2018: Kagoshima Rebnise
- 2018-: Saitama Broncos
- 2020–: Pioneros de Los Mochis

Darnell Martin (born October 16, 1991) is an American professional basketball player for Pioneros de Los Mochis of the Circuito de Baloncesto de la Costa del Pacífico (CIBACOPA).
