= Everett High School =

Everett High School may refer to:

- Everett High School (Massachusetts), Everett, Massachusetts
- Everett High School (Michigan), Lansing, Michigan
- Everett High School (Maryville, Tennessee), Maryville, Tennessee
- Everett High School (Washington), Everett, Washington
- Everett Alvarez High School, Salinas, California
- Everett Area Junior-Senior High School, Everett, Pennsylvania
- Mount Everett Regional School, Sheffield, Massachusetts
