= Plateros de Fresnillo =

- Conference: East
- League: LNBP
- Founded: 2019
- Dissolved: 2025
- History: Plateros de Fresnillo (2019–2025)
- Arena: Gimnasio Solidaridad Municipal
- Capacity: 4,500
- Location: Fresnillo, Zacatecas, Mexico
- Team colors: Red, silver, and white
- President: Miguel Ángel Romo
- Head coach: Sebastián Ginóbili
Home	Away

Plateros de Fresnillo (English: Fresnillo Silversmiths) was a professional Mexican basketball team, based in Fresnillo. The Plateros were part Liga Nacional de Baloncesto Profesional, the top professional basketball league in Mexico. The team played their home games at the Gimnasio Solidaridad Municipal, with a capacity of 4,000 spectators.

== History ==
The Plateros were founded in 2019 in order to compete in the 2019–20 LNBP season. The team was created by an initiative of the local government of Fresnillo and the state government of Zacatecas in order to promote basketball in the region. Initially, all the investment was made by the State of Zacatecas government, with an estimate amount of 13 million pesos (around US$560,000).

Plateros joined the three other new teams for the 2019–20: the Astros de Jalisco and the Dorados de Chihuahua.

== Players ==
=== Current roster ===
Note: Flags indicate national team eligibility at FIBA-sanctioned events. Players may hold other non-FIBA nationalities not displayed.

Plateros de Fresnillo roster
Players
Coaches

Pos.	No.	Nat.	Name	Ht.	Wt.
PF	1	(United States)	White, Tyrone	2.00 m (6 ft 7 in)	100 kg (220 lb)
PG	2	(United States)	Harvey, Christian	1.85 m (6 ft 1 in)	84 kg (185 lb)
PG	4	(Mexico)	Argomaníz, Miguel
SG	11	(Mexico)	Valdéz, Ricardo	1.98 m (6 ft 6 in)	95 kg (209 lb)
C	12	(Puerto Rico)	Collier, Devon	2.03 m (6 ft 8 in)	98 kg (216 lb)
C	13	(United States)	McClenton, Deion	2.08 m (6 ft 10 in)	115 kg (254 lb)
PG	15	(Mexico)	Higuera, Sergio	1.85 m (6 ft 1 in)	77 kg (170 lb)
PG	22	(Argentina)	Vázquez, Facundo	1.85 m (6 ft 1 in)	80 kg (176 lb)
PF	23	(Mexico)	Martínez, Miguel	2.02 m (6 ft 8 in)	98 kg (216 lb)
SG	24	(United States)	Bryson, Michael	1.93 m (6 ft 4 in)	91 kg (201 lb)
PG	32	(United States)	Anderson, Jerime	1.88 m (6 ft 2 in)	83 kg (183 lb)
SG	35	(Puerto Rico)	Matías, Ángel	1.94 m (6 ft 4 in)	90 kg (198 lb)

Head coach

- (Argentina) Sebastián Ginóbili

Assistant coach(es)

- (Argentina) Claudio Arrigoni

Legend

- (C) Team captain
- (I) Import player
- Injured

- Roster
Updated: 26 March 2020

=== Notable players ===
Note: Flags indicate national team eligibility at FIBA-sanctioned events. Players may hold other non-FIBA nationalities not displayed.

Criteria

To appear in this section a player must have either:

- Set a club record or won an individual award while at the club
- Played at least one official international match for their national team at any time
- Played at least one official NBA match at any time.

- (Jamaica) Adrian Uter
- (Mexico) Irwin Ávalos
- (Nigeria) Gani Lawal
- (Puerto Rico) Jaysean Paige
- (Puerto Rico) Filiberto Rivera
- (United States) Jamil Wilson
- (United States) Julian Wright
