= Jacobi Boykins =

American basketball player

No. 23 – Tadamon Hrajel
- Position: Shooting guard
- League: Lebanese Basketball League

Personal information
- Born: February 11, 1995 (age 31) St. Petersburg, Florida, U.S.
- Listed height: 6 ft 6 in (1.98 m)
- Listed weight: 180 lb (82 kg)

Career information
- High school: Lakewood (St. Petersburg, Florida)
- College: Louisiana Tech (2014–2018)
- NBA draft: 2018: undrafted
- Playing career: 2018–present

Career history
- 2018: Alba Fehérvár
- 2019–2020: Rio Grande Valley Vipers
- 2020: Sioux Falls Skyforce
- 2020: Panteras de Aguascalientes
- 2021: Spójnia Stargard
- 2021–2022: Arka Gdynia
- 2022: Semt77 Yalovaspor
- 2023: Mornar
- 2023–2024: Ironi Ness Ziona
- 2024: Ángeles de la Ciudad de México
- 2025–present: Tadamon Hrajel

Jacobi Boykins (born February 11, 1995) is an American professional basketball player for Tadamon Hrajel of the Lebanese Basketball League. He played college basketball for the Louisiana Tech Bulldogs.

== High school career ==
Boykins attended Lakewood High School and was coached by Anthony Lawrence Sr. He missed his entire junior season due to a car accident that fractured two vertebrae. As a senior, he led the team to the Florida Class 5A title game and scored 25 points in the 64–53 quarterfinal win at Cape Coral Mariner.

== College career ==
Boykins played college basketball at Louisiana Tech. He averaged 4.1 points and 1.0 rebound per game as a freshman. As a sophomore, Boykins averaged 9.3 points and 3.3 rebounds per game. On November 27, 2016, he scored a career-high 26 points and made six three-pointers in a 74–53 win over Maryland Eastern Shore. He was suspended for one game on January 27, 2017, due to his role in a bench-clearing fight against UAB that forced the Bulldogs to finish the game with four players. Boykins averaged 14.7 points, 4.7 rebounds, 2.2 assists, and 2 steals per game as a junior. He shot 46 percent from the floor and 41 percent from three-point range, setting the Louisiana Tech record with 89 made three-pointers. Boykins was named to the Third Team All-Conference USA as well as the Defensive Team. Following the season he declared for the 2017 NBA draft but ultimately returned to school. As a senior, Boykins averaged 14.7 points, 4.9 rebounds, and 1.5 assists per game. He was again named to the Third Team All-Conference USA.

== Professional career ==
After going undrafted in the 2018 NBA draft, Boykins signed with the Orlando Magic and averaged eight points and two rebounds per game in two games. He signed with the Rio Grande Valley Vipers of the NBA G League on January 6, 2019. In his rookie season, Boykins averaged 19.7 points and 6.1 rebounds per game. On December 31, Boykins matched his career-high with 29 points, including seven three-pointers, versus the Memphis Hustle. In his second season with the Vipers, Boykins averaged 13.7 points, 3.1 rebounds and 1.3 assists in 26.1 minutes per game. On February 27, 2020, Boykins was acquired by the Sioux Falls Skyforce alongside a second round pick in the 2020 NBA G League Draft in exchange for the rights to Jarnell Stokes.

On August 5, 2020, Boykins signed for the Croatian team Zadar, but left a month and a half later before playing an official game. On October 13, he signed with Panteras de Aguascalientes of the Liga Nacional de Baloncesto Profesional.

On July 20, 2021, he has signed with Spójnia Stargard of the Polish Basketball League (PLK).

On October 20, 2021, he has signed with Arka Gdynia of the Polish Basketball League.

On October 4, 2022, he has signed with Semt77 Yalovaspor of the Turkish Basketball First League.

In 2023–24, Boykins played six games for Ironi Nes Ziona of the Israeli Basketball Premier League, averaging 9.0 points per game while shooting .846 from the free throw line.

In February 2024, Boykins signed with the Ángeles de la Ciudad de México of the Circuito de Baloncesto de la Costa del Pacífico (CIBACOPA).
