= José Estrada (basketball) =

Mexican basketball player (born 1994)

No. 2 – Dorados de Chihuahua
- Position: Shooting guard
- League: LNBP

Personal information
- Born: 15 February 1994 (age 32) Los Mochis, Sinaloa, Mexico
- Listed height: 6 ft 4 in (1.93 m)
- Listed weight: 215 lb (98 kg)

Career information
- College: Veracruzana University
- Playing career: 2013–present

Career history
- 2013: Halcones de Xalapa
- 2014: Soles de Mexicali
- 2015: Halcones Rojos Veracruz
- 2016: Soles de Mexicali
- 2017: Mexico City Capitanes
- 2018: Correbasket UAT
- 2019–2021: Soles de Mexicali
- 2022–2023: Halcones de Xalapa
- 2023: Mineros de Zacatecas
- 2024–present: Dorados de Chihuahua
- 2025: Halcones de Ciudad Obregón
- 2026–present: Pioneros de Los Mochis

José David Estrada Stone (born 15 February 1994) is a Mexican professional basketball player.

== Career ==
Estrada made his debut in the 2013 season with the Halcones de Xalapa to play in the LNBP. He played with Soles de Mexicali in the seasons 2014, 2016, 2019, 2020 and 2021. In 2017 he played with Mexico City Capitanes. In 2024 he signed with Dorados de Chihuahua.

== National team career ==
Since 2024, he has been a member of the Mexican national team. He was part of the squad that participated in the 2025 FIBA AmeriCup qualification.
