= Kavell Bigby-Williams =

British basketball player (born 1995)

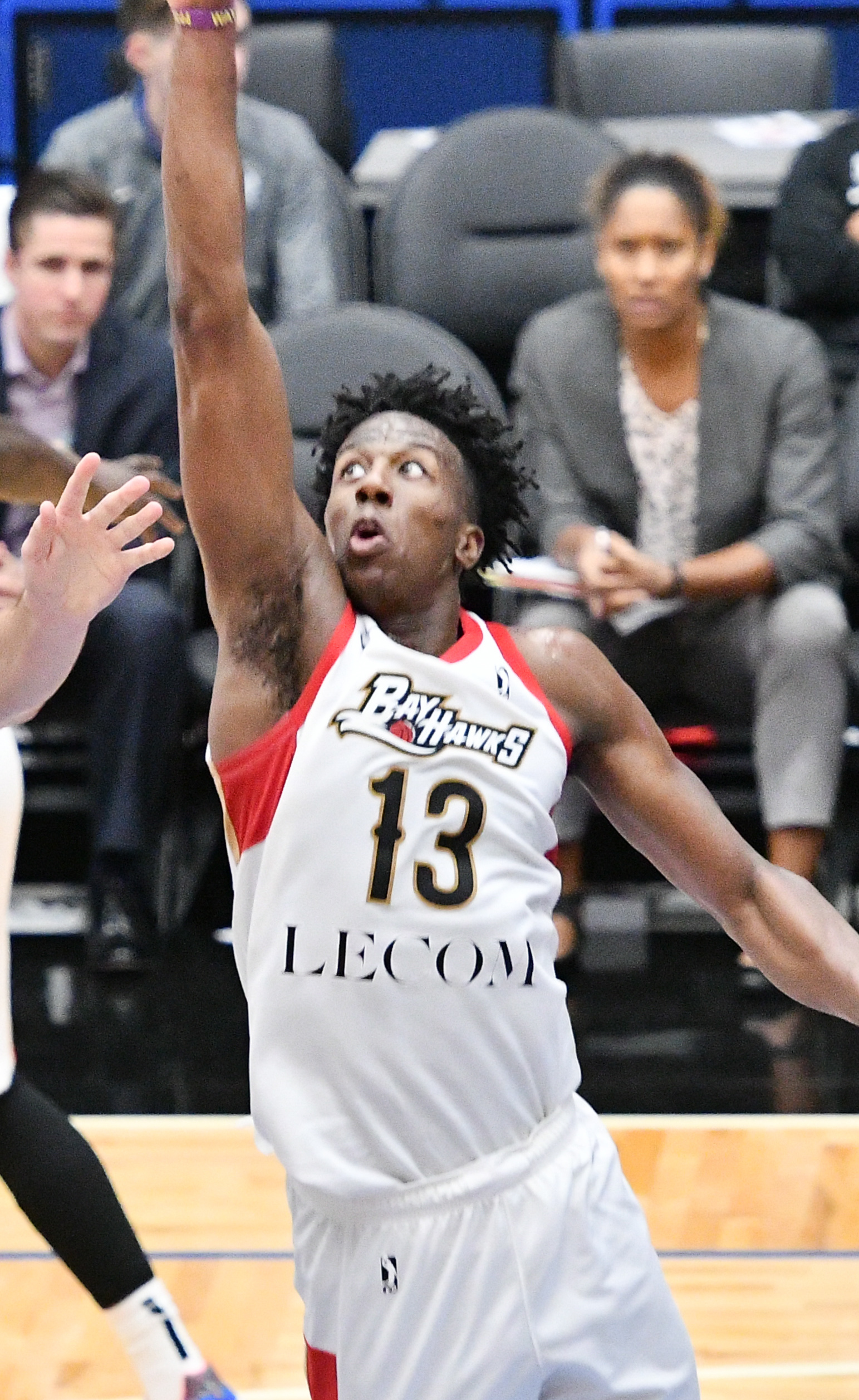
- Bigby-Williams in November 2019

No. 13 – South Gobi Broncos
- Position: Power forward / center
- League: The League; East Asia Super League

Personal information
- Born: 7 October 1995 (age 31) London, England
- Listed height: 2.11 m (6 ft 11 in)
- Listed weight: 113 kg (249 lb)

Career information
- High school: Harris Academy Beckenham (Beckenham, England)
- College: Gillette (2014–2016); Oregon (2016–2017); LSU (2018–2019)
- NBA draft: 2019: undrafted
- Playing career: 2019–present

Career history
- 2019–2020: Erie BayHawks
- 2020: Sioux Falls Skyforce
- 2020: Fort Wayne Mad Ants
- 2020–2021: Cantù
- 2021: Antwerp Giants
- 2021–2022: Anwil Włocławek
- 2022: Fort Wayne Mad Ants
- 2022: Indios de San Francisco
- 2022: Boulazac
- 2023: Héroes de Falcón
- 2023: Kaohsiung 17LIVE Steelers
- 2024: Astros de Jalisco
- 2024: Al Ahli Tripoli
- 2024–2025: Jilin Northeast Tigers
- 2025: Al Ahly
- 2025: Astros de Jalisco
- 2025–2026: Al Sharjah
- 2026: Club Central Jounieh
- 2026–present: South Gobi Broncos

Career highlights
- CIBACOPA All-Star (2024); NABC Junior College Player of the Year (2016); First-team NJCAA All-American (2016)
- Stats at Basketball Reference

Kavell Chevano Bigby-Williams (born 7 October 1995) is a British professional basketball player for the South Gobi Broncos of the Mongolian The League and the East Asia Super League. He was named NABC NJCAA Player of the Year as a sophomore at Gillette College in 2016, before playing college basketball for the Oregon Ducks and the LSU Tigers.

== Early life ==
Bigby-Williams grew up playing soccer in East London. He was a 6'6 goalkeeper at the age of 15 when he broke his leg. After recovering from his injury, he turned his attention to basketball and quickly mastered the fundamentals. As a senior at Harris Academy Beckenham, he averaged 20.7 points, 15.4 rebounds and 6 blocks per game. He committed to play college basketball at Montana State but failed to qualify academically, so he instead ended up at Gillette College in Wyoming.

== College career ==
As a freshman, Bigby-Williams averaged 10.1 points and 9.6 rebounds per game. As a sophomore at Gillette, Bigby-Williams averaged 16.8 points, 13.6 rebounds and 5.6 blocks per game. He was named NABC NJCAA Player of the Year. Bigby-Williams was the top-ranked junior college prospect and signed with Oregon in April 2016.

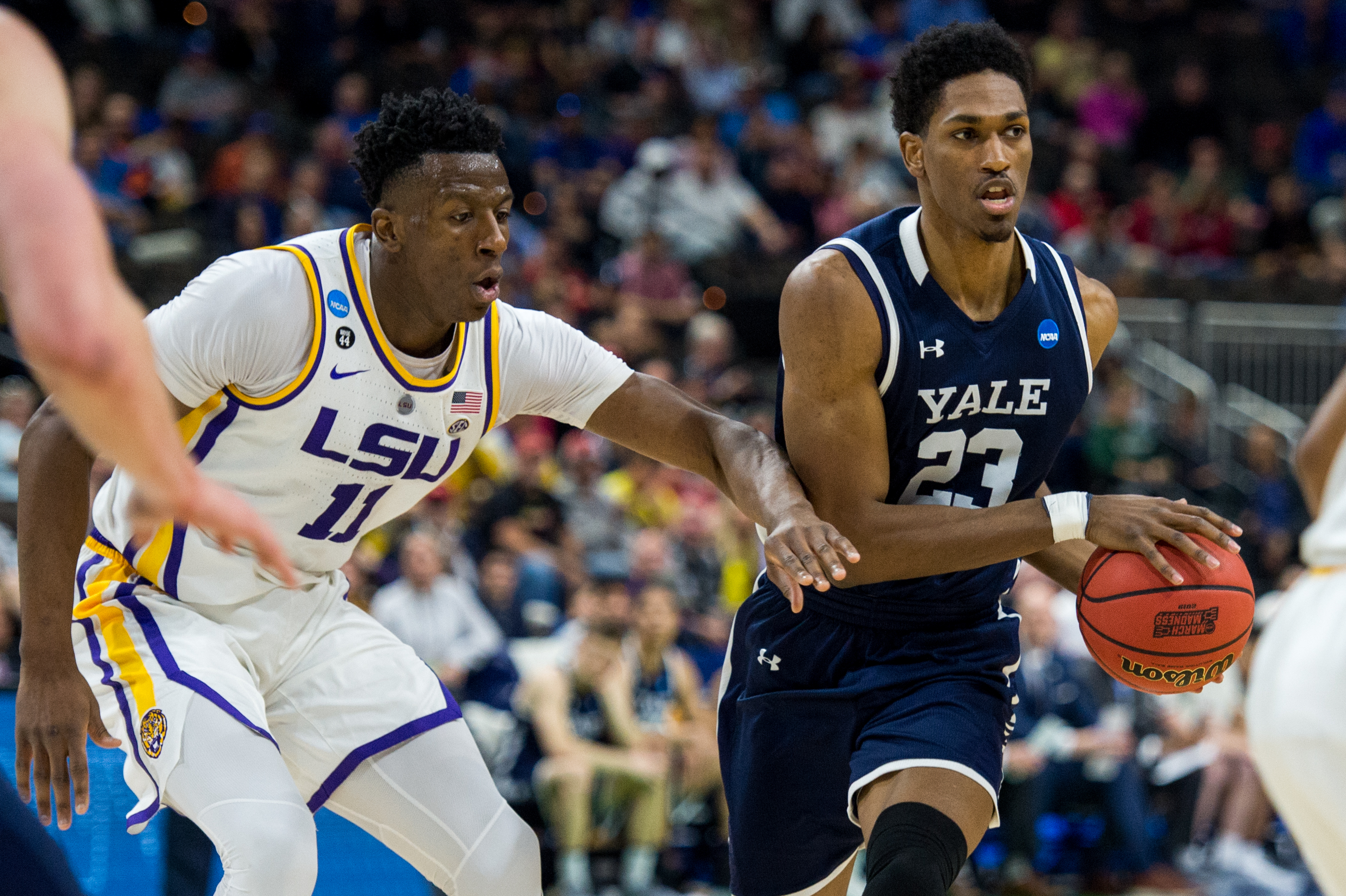
Bigby-Williams (left) with LSU in the 2019 NCAA tournament

As a junior, Bigby-Williams averaged 3 points and 2.8 rebounds per game. He received more playing time after Chris Boucher was injured in the Pac-12 Tournament. In the NCAA Tournament, he averaged 2.2 points and 2.4 rebounds per game to help Oregon reach the Final Four. Following the season, he opted to transfer to LSU. After posting 14 points, 10 rebounds, five blocks and a steal in a 83–69 victory at Ole Miss, followed by 12 points and 11 rebounds in an 89–67 win against South Carolina, Bigby-Williams was named SEC player of the week on 21 January 2019. As a senior, he averaged 7.9 points, 6.7 rebounds, and 1.9 blocks per game.

== Professional career ==
=== NBA G League ===
After going undrafted in the 2019 NBA draft, Bigby-Williams was signed by the Charlotte Hornets but quickly released, instead joining the New Orleans Pelicans. Bigby-Williams was signed by the Pelicans on 6 August 2019 to an Exhibit 10 contract. After playing in one preseason game, he was waived on 19 October. He joined their affiliate in the NBA G League, the Erie BayHawks. On 10 January 2020, Bigby-Williams missed a game with an undisclosed injury. He posted 18 points, 12 rebounds, six blocks, one assist and one steal in a loss to the Iowa Wolves on 23 January. Bigby-Williams averaged 8.5 points, 9.2 rebounds and 2.1 blocks per game in 25 games.

On 4 February, he was traded to the Sioux Falls Skyforce in exchange for Raphiael Putney. On 27 February, Bigby-Williams was traded to the Fort Wayne Mad Ants in exchange for a 2020 2nd round pick and the rights of Isaiah Hartenstein.

=== Europe ===
On 14 December 2020, he signed with Pallacanestro Cantù of the Lega Basket Serie A. On 11 March 2021, Bigby-Williams left Cantù and moved to Belgium in the Pro Basketball League, signing with the Antwerp Giants. On 19 August 2021, he signed with Anwil Włocławek of the Polish Basketball League.

=== Return to the G League ===
On 1 February 2022, Bigby-Williams was re-acquired by the Fort Wayne Mad Ants of the NBA G League through his returning player rights.

=== Kaohsiung 17LIVE Steelers ===
On 12 September 2023, Bigby-Williams signed with the Kaohsiung 17LIVE Steelers of the P. League+. On 22 December, his contract was terminated.

=== Astros de Jalisco ===
Bigby-Williams joined the Astros de Jalisco of the Circuito de Baloncesto de la Costa del Pacífico (CIBACOPA) in Mexico ahead of the 2024 CIBACOPA season, arriving in time to participate in the preseason Copa Salsa Huichol. He earned league All-Star honors.

=== Al Ahli Tripoli ===
On 29 October 2024, Bigby-Williams signed with Al Ahli Tripoli for the BAL qualifiers which was in Ivory Coast. Where they went on to win that tournament securing qualification for the BAL finals

=== Jilin Northeast Tigers ===
In November 2024, Bigby-Williams linked with the NorthPort Batang Pier of the Philippine Basketball Association (PBA) as the team's import for the 2024–25 PBA Commissioner's Cup, but he took an offer of trying out with the Jilin Northeast Tigers of the Chinese Basketball Association (CBA), NorthPort Batang Pier changed to tap Kadeem Jack. On 27 November, Bigby-Williams signed with Jilin Northeast Tigers.

== National team career ==
Bigby-Williams represented Great Britain in its Under-20 and Under-18 teams, averaging 8.9 points, 7.3 rebounds and 1.4 blocks per game between the two squads. He represented the senior national team at EuroBasket 2022.

== Personal life ==
Born in England, Bigby-Williams is of Jamaican and Dominica descent. He is a cousin of the British-Canadian boxer Lennox Lewis.
