= Markel Crawford =

American basketball player

Ostioneros de Guaymas
- Position: Shooting guard
- League: CIBACOPA

Personal information
- Born: October 24, 1994 (age 32)
- Listed height: 6 ft 4 in (1.93 m)
- Listed weight: 210 lb (95 kg)

Career information
- High school: Melrose (Memphis, Tennessee)
- College: Memphis (2014–2017); Ole Miss (2017–2018)
- NBA draft: 2018: undrafted
- Playing career: 2018–present

Career history
- 2018–2019: Memphis Hustle
- 2019–2020: Agua Caliente Clippers
- 2020–2021: Club Atlético Peñarol
- 2021: Kataja BC
- 2022: BK Lions Jindrichuv Hradec
- 2023: Ostioneros de Guaymas
- 2023: Freseros de Irapuato
- 2024–present: Ostioneros de Guaymas

Career highlights
- CIBACOPA All-Star (2024)
- Stats at Basketball Reference

Markel Crawford (born October 22, 1994) is an American professional basketball player for the Ostioneros de Guaymas of the CIBACOPA. He played college basketball for Memphis and Ole Miss.

== High school career ==
Crawford attended Melrose High School in Memphis. Crawford averaged 15.2 points per game as a junior to lead Melrose to a 24–8 record and the District 16AAA championship. He missed his entire senior season due to tearing his ACL in the summer of 2012. Despite this, he was ranked the No. 59 player by Rivals.com and signed with Memphis out of high school.

== College career ==
Crawford redshirted his freshman season at Memphis after recovering from his ACL injury. As a redshirt freshman, he posted 5.9 points, 2.3 rebounds and 1.8 assists per game. On September 30, 2015, the apartment that Crawford shared with teammate Trahson Burrell was destroyed by fire. Crawford averaged 5.3 points and 3.2 rebounds per game as a sophomore. As a junior, Crawford averaged 12.8 points and 4.4 rebounds per game, shooting 48 percent from the field and 33 percent from behind the arc. He scored 28 points in a win against South Carolina and had 30 points in a victory over South Florida. After the season Crawford opted to transfer for his final season, receiving interest from Texas, South Carolina and Iowa State but ultimately signing with Ole Miss. As a senior at Ole Miss, Crawford posted 9.2 points, 4.0 rebounds, 2.1 assists and 1.19 steals per game.

== Professional career ==
After going undrafted in the 2018 NBA draft, Crawford signed with the Memphis Grizzlies for NBA Summer League play. He averaged 9.6 points and 1.9 rebounds per game in seven games. Crawford signed a training camp contract with the Grizzlies on August 16, 2018. He was waived on October 13, as one of the final roster cuts before opening night. Crawford was ultimately added to the Grizzlies’ NBA G League affiliate, Memphis Hustle.

For the 2019–20 season, Crawford joined the Agua Caliente Clippers. On December 8, 2019, Crawford contributed 20 points and added one rebound and a steal in a loss to the Memphis Hustle. During the 2020–21 season, he joined Club Atlético Peñarol of the Argentine league and averaged 8.0 points and 1.9 rebounds per game. On July 6, 2021, Crawford signed with Kataja BC of the Korisliiga.

Crawford was named a CIBACOPA All-Star in 2024 as a member of the Ostioneros de Guaymas.
