= Jhovanny García =

Mexican basketball player (born 1986)

Pioneros de Los Mochis
- Position: Head coach
- League: CIBACOPA

Personal information
- Born: 1 January 1986 (age 40) Mexico City, Mexico
- Listed height: 5 ft 8 in (1.73 m)
- Listed weight: 171 lb (78 kg)

Career history

Playing
- 2011: Volcanes del Estado de México
- 2012–2015: Gansos Salvajes UIC

Coaching
- 2019: Ángeles de Puebla
- 2020–2024: Pioneros de Los Mochis (Assistant)
- 2024: Diablos Rojos del México (Assistant)
- 2025–present: Pioneros de Los Mochis

Jhovanny Eder García García (born 1 January 1986) is a Mexican former professional basketball player and current head coach of the Pioneros de Los Mochis in the CIBACOPA.

== Career ==
García made his debut in 2011 season with the Volcanes del Estado de México to play in the LNBP. He also played in the Gansos Salvajes UIC of the same league.

== Coaching career ==
He started his coaching career in 2019 with Ángeles de Puebla. He joined the coaching staff of Pioneros de Los Mochis in 2020. He was part of the staff of Diablos Rojos del México that won the championship of the 2024 season. In 2025 he was announced as head coach of Pioneros de Los Mochis.
