= Santiago Belza =

Argentine basketball coach (born 1988)

Dorados de Chihuahua
- Position: Assistant coach
- League: LNBP

Personal information
- Born: 3 August 1988 (age 38) Mar de Plata, Argentina
- Coaching career: 2014–present

Career history

Coaching
- 2014: Al Ahli Club (Assistant)
- 2015–2016: Huracán de Trelew (Assistant)
- 2016–2020: Peñarol de Mar de Plata (Assistant)
- 2020–present: Dorados de Chihuahua (Assistant)
- 2023–2025: Adelitas de Chihuahua (Assistant)
- 2026–present: Adelitas de Chihuahua

Santiago Belza (born 3 August 1988) is an Argentine basketball coach. He is the head coach of the Adelitas de Chihuahua.

== Coaching career ==
Belza started his coaching career in Bahrain as part of the staff of Al Ahli Club in 2014. In 2016 he joined the staff of Peñarol de Mar de Plata. On 2020, he signed with the staff of Dorados de Chihuahua. In 2026, Belza signed as head coach of Adelitas de Chihuahua of the LNBPF.
