= Monterey Bay League =

High school athletic conference in California

Monterey Bay League (MBL) was a high school athletic conference part of the CIF Central Coast Section of the California Interscholastic Federation. It comprised high schools generally around Monterey County, California, with schools from southern Santa Clara County, Watsonville on the edge of Santa Cruz County and one of only two high schools in San Benito County. Not all schools participated in all sports. In 2017, Monterey Bay League merged with the Mission Trail Athletic League (MTAL) to create the Pacific Coast Athletic League (PCAL).

== Historical Members ==
- Alisal High School
- Everett Alvarez High School
- Aptos High School
- Christopher High School
- Gilroy High School
- Live Oak High School
- Monte Vista Christian School
- Monterey High School
- North Monterey County High School
- North Salinas High School
- Notre Dame High School
- Pajaro Valley High School
- Palma High School
- Salinas High School
- San Benito High School
- Seaside High School
- Watsonville High School
