= Ricardo Valdéz =

Mexican basketball player (born 1995)

No. 11 – Dorados de Chihuahua
- Position: Shooting guard
- League: LNBP

Personal information
- Born: 23 May 1995 (age 31) Ojinaga, Chihuahua, Mexico
- Listed height: 6 ft 6 in (1.98 m)
- Listed weight: 220 lb (100 kg)

Career information
- College: Autonomous University of Chihuahua
- NBA draft: 2017: undrafted
- Playing career: 2019–present

Career history
- 2019: Mexico City Capitanes
- 2020: Vaqueros de Agua Prieta
- 2020–2021: Abejas de León
- 2021: Centauros de Chihuahua
- 2022: Dorados de Chihuahua
- 2023: Santos del Potosí
- 2024: Apaches de Chihuahua
- 2024: Plateros de Fresnillo
- 2025–: Dorados de Chihuahua

Ricardo Valdéz Bustamante (born 23 May 1994) is a Mexican professional basketball player.

== Career ==
Estrada made his debut in the 2019 season with the Mexico City Capitanes to play in the LNBP. He played with Abejas de León in the seasons 2020 and 2021. In 2022 and 2025 he played with Dorados de Chihuahua. In 2024 he signed with Plateros de Fresnillo.

== National team career ==
In 2024, he was a member of the preliminary list of the Mexican national team that participated in the 2024 FIBA Men's Olympic Qualifying Tournaments.
