= Louis McCullough =

American basketball player

Louis McCullough (born March 13, 1982, in Goose Creek, South Carolina) is an American professional basketball player.

McCullough currently plays for Paraguayan Olimpia, after a successful spell at Chester Jets in the British Basketball League. Previously the Forward has played for Mexican teams Astros de Tecate and Osos de Guadalajara in the Liga Nacional de Baloncesto Profesional, and was picked up as the number one draft pick for the South Carolina Heat in the World Basketball Association in 2005. He earned league all-star honors as a member of the Frayles de Guasave of the Circuito de Baloncesto de la Costa del Pacífico (CIBACOPA) in 2010. He was named MVP of the CIBACOPA All-Star Game four times.

McCullough, who is the half brother of former basketball player Kevin Garnett, and cousin to Shammond Williams, was inline for the 2004 NBA draft, before dropping out early while still studying at Francis Marion University.
