= Michael Bryson (basketball) =

American basketball player

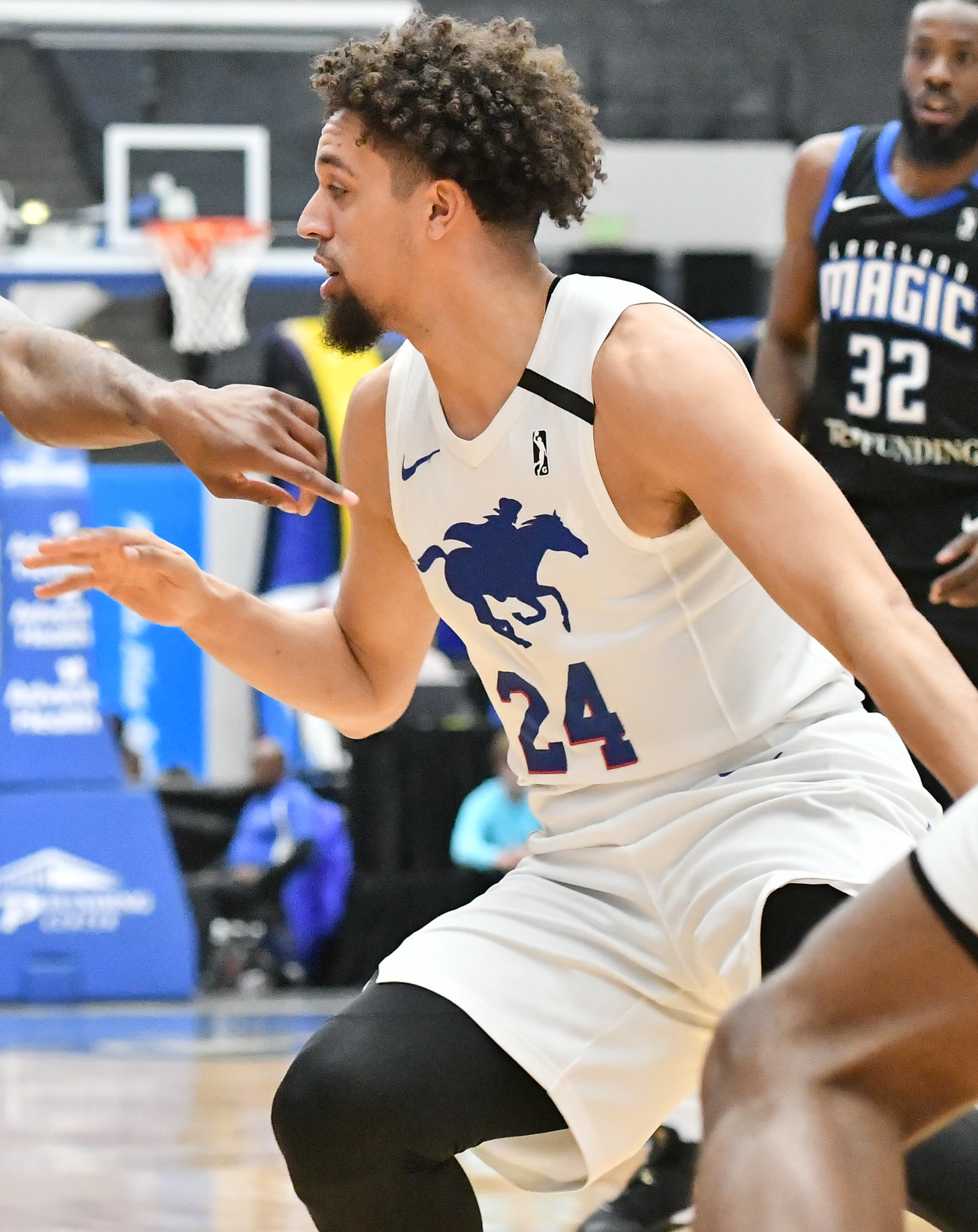

No. 24 – Jiangxi Ganchi
- Position: Shooting guard
- League: NBL

Personal information
- Born: September 30, 1994 (age 32) Sacramento, California, U.S.
- Listed height: 6 ft 4 in (1.93 m)
- Listed weight: 200 lb (91 kg)

Career information
- High school: Foothill (Sacramento, California)
- College: UC Santa Barbara (2012–2016)
- NBA draft: 2016: undrafted
- Playing career: 2016–present

Career history
- 2016: Sydney Kings
- 2016–2017: Northern Arizona Suns
- 2017–2018: Iowa Wolves
- 2018: Rayos de Hermosillo
- 2018–2020: Delaware Blue Coats
- 2021: Guelph Nighthawks
- 2021–2022: PVSK Panthers
- 2024: Astros de Jalisco
- 2024: Plateros de Fresnillo
- 2025: Toros Laguna
- 2025: Marinos
- 2025: Gambusinos de Fresnillo
- 2025–present: Jiangxi Ganchi

Career highlights
- CIBACOPA All-Star (2024); 2× First-team All-Big West (2015, 2016)

Michael Joseph Bryson (born September 30, 1994) is an American basketball player for the Jiangxi Ganchi of the National Basketball League (NBL). He played college basketball for the UC Santa Barbara Gauchos.

== College career ==
As a sophomore at UC Santa Barbara, Bryson posted 11.5 points and 4.3 rebounds per game. Bryson averaged 13.9 points and 4.8 rebounds a game as a junior in 2014–15. Bryson was named to the First Team All-Big West. He missed a game in November 2015 because he played in an unauthorized league in July. As a senior, Bryson averaged 18 points and 6.4 rebounds per game. He became the all-time leader in three-point makes for the Gauchos. Bryson was named to the First Team All-Big West as a senior.

== Professional career ==
Prior to the 2016 NBA draft, Bryson worked out with the Sacramento Kings, Los Angeles Lakers, and Philadelphia 76ers. In the NBA Summer League, he competed for the Phoenix Suns. Bryson signed with the Sydney Kings of the Australian National Basketball League in August 2016. He was selected by the Northern Arizona Suns with the eighth pick in the 2016 NBA Development League Draft and signed with the team. Bryson played in 46 games for the Suns and averaged 5.1 points and 2.4 rebounds per game. In October 2017, he was traded to the Iowa Wolves along with Elijah Millsap and the eighth pick in the 2017 G League Draft in exchange for the rights to Zach Andrews and the Wolves' No. 1 pick in the draft. Bryson finished second to DeQuan Jones in the 2018 G-League Slam Dunk Contest. Bryson averaged 7.9 points and 2.5 rebounds per game for the Wolves.

On May 16, 2018, Bryson signed with Rayos de Hermosillo of the Mexican CIBACOPA. Bryson was added to the Delaware Blue Coats training camp roster in October 2018.

Bryson joined the Guelph Nighthawks in 2021 and averaged 18 points, 5.2 rebounds, and 1.7 assists per game. On August 24, 2021, Bryson signed with the PVSK Panthers of the Hungarian Nemzeti Bajnokság I/A.

Bryson signed with the Astros de Jalisco in February 2024. He earned league All-Star honors.
