= Guillermo Narvarte =

Argentine basketball coach

Club La Unión
- Position: Head coach
- League: Liga Nacional de Básquetbol

Personal information
- Born: 29 April 1965 (age 61) Mar de Plata, Argentina
- Coaching career: 1995–present

Career history

Coaching
- 1995–1996: Independiente de Neuquén
- 1998–2004: Club Sportivo Ben Hur
- 2004–2006: Club Atlético Peñarol (Mar del Plata)
- 2006: Deportes Castro
- 2007: Universidad de Concepción
- 2008: Trotamundos de Carabobo
- 2008–2009: Club Biguá de Villa Biarritz
- 2009: Trotamundos de Carabobo
- 2010: Toros de Aragua
- 2010–2011: Ciclista Olímpico
- 2011–2012: Club San Martín de Corrientes
- 2012–2015: Piratas de La Guaira
- 2015–2016: Club La Unión
- 2017–2018: Deportes Castro
- 2018–2020: Boca Juniors
- 2020–2021: Club Atlético Goes
- 2023: Trotamundos de Carabobo
- 2023: Abejas de León
- 2024: Halcones de Ciudad Obregón
- 2024–2025: Dorados de Chihuahua
- 2025: Peñarol
- 2026–present: Club La Unión

Guillermo Narvarte (born 29 April 1965) is an Argentine professional basketball coach. He is currenrly the head coach of Argentine team Club La Unión in the Liga Nacional de Básquetbol.

== Coaching career ==
Narvarte started his coaching career in Argentina with Independiente de Neuquén. He was the assistant coach of the Argentine National Team which won the bronze medal in the 2008 Beijing Olympics. In 2012 he joined Piratas de La Guaira. On 2018, he signed with Boca Juniors. On 2020, he joined Club Atlético Goes. In 2023, Narvarte signed with Halcones de Ciudad Obregón and with the Abejas de León. The next season he signed with Dorados de Chihuahua. In March 2025 Narvarte was hired by Peñarol of Montevideo.
