= Centro de Usos Múltiples de Los Mochis =

Arena in Sinaloa, Mexico

Coordinates: 25°44′47.3″N 109°01′41.3″W

- Location: Los Mochis, Mexico
- Owner: Municipality of Ahome
- Capacity: 5,830

Construction
- Opened: 2014

Tenant
- Pioneros de Los Mochis (CIBACOPA) (2018–present)

The Centro de Usos Múltiples de Los Mochis is an arena in Los Mochis, Mexico. The arena was opened on 2014. The arena is the home venue of the Pioneros de Los Mochis of the CIBACOPA.
