= Nick Duron =

American baseball player (born 1996)

- Pitcher
- Born: January 30, 1996 (age 29); Salinas, California, U.S.
- Batted: Right Threw: Right

MLB debut
- July 13, 2022, for the Philadelphia Phillies

Last MLB appearance
- July 13, 2022, for the Philadelphia Phillies

MLB statistics
- Win–loss record: 0–0
- Earned run average: 0.00
- Strikeouts: 1
- Stats at Baseball Reference

Teams
- Philadelphia Phillies (2022)

Nicholas Gregory Duron (born January 30, 1996) is an American former professional baseball pitcher. He played college baseball for Clark College in Vancouver, Washington. He was drafted by the Boston Red Sox in the 31st round of the 2015 MLB draft and pitched in one game in Major League Baseball (MLB) for the Philadelphia Phillies.

== Career ==
Duron was born in Salinas, California. He attended Everett Alvarez High School in Salinas and Tigard High School ('14) in Tigard, Oregon. He then attended Clark College in Vancouver, Washington, for whom he was 2–1 with a 3.75 earned-run average, and struck out 40 batters in 36 innings.

=== Boston Red Sox ===
He was drafted by the Boston Red Sox in the 31st round of the 2015 MLB June Amateur Draft. In 2015, he pitched for the GCL Red Sox in the Gulf Coast League, and was 2–1 with two saves and a 1.71 ERA in 26.1 innings in which he struck out 28 batters. He missed the 2016 season, after undergoing Tommy John surgery to repair an ulnar collateral ligament injury.

In 2017, Duron spent the season with the Low-A Lowell Spinners, pitching to a 3-5 record and 3.35 ERA with 36 strikeouts in 53.2 innings of work across 13 appearances (12 starts). The next year, he split the season between the rookie-level GCL Red Sox and the Single-A Greenville Drive, posting a cumulative 0-6 record and 7.53 ERA with 24 strikeouts in 28.2 innings pitched in 10 games (6 starts). On March 28, 2019, Duron was released by the Red Sox organization.

=== Southern Illinois Miners ===
On April 29, 2019, Duron signed with the Southern Illinois Miners of the Frontier League. In 10 games, he recorded a 2-0 record and 1.35 ERA with 18 strikeouts and 2 saves in 13.1 innings pitched.

=== Seattle Mariners ===
On June 7, 2019, Duron signed a minor league contract with the Seattle Mariners organization. He finished the year appearing in 25 games for the High-A Modesto Nuts, logging a 3-1 record and 2.23 ERA with 51 strikeouts in 36 1/3 innings pitched.

Duron did not play in a game in 2020 due to the cancellation of the minor league season because of the COVID-19 pandemic. He split 2021 between the Double-A Arkansas Travelers and the Triple-A Tacoma Rainiers. He was a combined 4–2 with four saves and a 4.50 ERA in 38 relief appearances covering 42 innings in which he struck out 43 batters. He became a free agent following the season on November 7, 2021.

=== Philadelphia Phillies ===
On January 9, 2022, Duron signed a minor league contract with the Philadelphia Phillies organization. In 2022, pitching for the Triple-A Lehigh Valley IronPigs, Duron worked to a 4–7 record with seven saves and a 2.77 ERA in 52 relief appearances covering 48.2 innings in which he struck out 63 batters (11.7 strikeouts/9 innings), and induced a 50.4% ground-ball percentage. He was named a 2022 MiLB Organization All Star.

On July 12, 2022, Duron was selected to the 40-man roster and promoted to the major leagues for the first time. He made his major league debut on July 13. His fastball averaged 97.2 mph during his MLB appearance. He elected free agency on November 10.

=== San Francisco Giants ===
On December 15, 2022, Duron signed a minor league contract with the San Francisco Giants organization. He began the 2023 season with the Triple-A Sacramento River Cats, where he posted a 1-1 record and 2.25 ERA with 9 strikeouts in 8.0 innings pitched across 6 appearances.

=== San Diego Padres ===
On April 21, 2023, Duron was traded to the San Diego Padres in exchange for cash considerations. Despite strong results in Sacramento, Duron struggled to a 12.91 ERA with 8 strikeouts in 7 2/3 innings across 8 games for the Triple–A El Paso Chihuahuas. He was released by the Padres organization on June 9.

=== Lancaster Barnstormers ===
On July 18, 2023, Duron signed with the Lancaster Barnstormers of the Atlantic League of Professional Baseball. In 23 games for the Barnstormers, he posted a 2.01 ERA with 36 strikeouts and 2 saves in 22 1/3 innings pitched. With Lancaster, Duron won the Atlantic League championship. He became a free agent following the 2023 season.
