= Eric Griffin =

Eric Griffin may refer to:

- Eric Griffin (musician), American bass guitarist with Murderdolls
- Eric Griffin (boxer), American boxer
- Eric Griffin (basketball), American basketball player

== See also ==
- Erik Griffin, American stand-up comedian and actor
