= Tony Farmer (basketball, born 1994) =

American basketball player

No. 55 – Halcones de Ciudad Obregón
- Position: Small forward
- League: CIBACOPA

Personal information
- Born: March 24, 1994 (age 32) Cleveland, Ohio, U.S.
- Listed height: 6 ft 6 in (1.98 m)
- Listed weight: 245 lb (111 kg)

Career information
- High school: Garfield Heights (Garfield Heights, Ohio)
- College: Lee (2015–2017)
- NBA draft: 2017: undrafted
- Playing career: 2018–present

Career history
- 2018–2019: Yakima SunKings
- 2019–2020: Al Rayyan
- 2020: Halcones de Ciudad Obregón
- 2021: Pichincha de Potosí
- 2021: Riachuelo de La Rioja
- 2022–2024: Halcones de Ciudad Obregón
- 2022: Correcaminos UAT Victoria
- 2022: Punto Rojo LR
- 2023: Al Salam
- 2023: Al Manama
- 2023–2024: Al Nawair
- 2024: Indios de San Francisco de Macorís
- 2024: Olimpia Kings
- 2024–2025: Beirut Club
- 2025: Marinos
- 2026–present: Halcones de Ciudad Obregón

Career highlights
- 2× CIBACOPA All-Star (2022, 2024); CIBACOPA scoring leader (2024)

Tony Christopher Farmer (born March 24, 1994) is an American professional basketball player who last played for Marinos of the Superliga Profesional de Baloncesto. Farmer was a top-100 ESPN recruit with NBA potential, but his career was brought to a halt when he was sentenced to three years in prison after pleading guilty to kidnapping, assault and robbery against his former girlfriend in 2012. After his release in 2015, he played college basketball at Lee College and participated in the 2017 NBA draft, where he went undrafted.

== Early life and education ==
Farmer excelled at Garfield Heights High School outside of Cleveland, Ohio, graduating in 2012. He was rated among the top 100 high school players in the U.S. In his senior year, Farmer was being recruited by several Division I schools, including a handful in the Big Ten.

== College career ==
Farmer planned to enroll at Lincoln College, but was refused admission. He eventually signed to play with Lee College, a community college in Baytown, Texas. As a freshman in 2015–16, he made 31 appearances for the Runnin’ Rebels, averaging 16.7 points, 8.7 rebounds and 2.4 assists a contest. In 2016–17, Farmer scored 17.4 points per outing, while pulling down 9.5 rebounds and dishing out 3.2 assists a game.

After the conclusion of his sophomore year, Farmer turned pro and put his name in the 2017 NBA draft. He would ultimately be undrafted that year.

== Professional career ==
=== Yakima SunKings (2018–2019) ===
In the 2018 season, Farmer played two games for the Yakima SunKings of the NAPB.

=== Al Rayyan (2019–2020) ===
Farmer signed with Al Rayyan of the Qatari Basketball League on November 12, 2019. He averaged 19.7 points, 10.9 rebounds and 3.1 assists per game in 16 games played.

=== Halcones de Ciudad Obregón (2020) ===
In 2020, Farmer played two games with Mexican team Halcones de Ciudad Obregón of the Circuito de Baloncesto de la Costa del Pacífico (CIBACOPA) before the league was suspended due to the COVID-19 pandemic.

=== Pichincha de Potosí (2021) ===
Farmer played with Bolivian team Pichincha de Potosí in 2021, leading them to an appearance in the league finals.

=== Riachuelo de La Rioja (2021) ===
In September 2021, Farmer signed with Riachuelo de La Rioja in Argentina.

=== Second stint with the Halcones (2022–2023) ===
Farmer returned to the Halcones de Ciudad Obregón for the 2022 CIBACOPA season. He earned All-Star honors. Farmer returned to the Halcones for the 2023 season.

=== Al Salam (2023) ===
He made his debut for Al Salam in Saudi Arabia in October 2023. Farmer appeared in five games for the team, averaging 21.4 points as well as 7.4 rebounds per contest.

=== Al Manama (2023) ===
Farmer moved to Al Manama of Bahrain in November 2023. In three appearances, he averaged 14.7 points, 8.7 rebounds, 1.0 assist, and 1.0 steal per game.

=== Al Nawair (2023–2024) ===
Farmer joined Al Nawair of Syria in December 2023.

=== Third stint with the Halcones (2024) ===
Farmer returned to the Halcones de Ciudad Obregón for the 2024 CIBACOPA season. He again earned All-Star honors. Farmer led the league in scoring with 23.1 point per game.

=== Beirut Club (2024) ===
On December 22, 2024, Farmer signed with the Beirut Club of the Lebanese Basketball League.

=== Marinos (2025) ===
On February 27, 2025, Farmer signed with Marinos of the Superliga Profesional de Baloncesto.

== Legal issues ==
In May 2012, Farmer was indicted by a grand jury on charges of kidnapping, assault and robbery against his former girlfriend in the Cleveland, Ohio suburb of Bedford Heights.

In August 2012, Farmer pled guilty to all three charges and was sentenced to three years imprisonment. In June 2015, he was released from prison.

In September 2020, police in Kenner, Louisiana issued a warrant for Farmer's arrest on felony domestic abuse battery.
