= Mission Trail Athletic League =

Defunct high school athletic conference

Mission Trail Athletic League (MTAL) was a high school athletic conference part of the CIF Central Coast Section of the California Interscholastic Federation. It comprised high schools generally around Monterey County, California, with schools from southern Santa Clara County, Santa Cruz County and one of only two high schools in San Benito County. Not all schools participated in all sports. In 2017, Mission Trail Athletic League merged with the Monterey Bay League (MBL) to create the Pacific Coast Athletic League (PCAL).

== Historical Members ==
- Anzar High School
- Carmel High School
- Gonzales High School
- Greenfield High School
- King City High School
- Georgiana Bruce Kirby Preparatory School
- Marina High School
- Oakwood School
- Pacific Collegiate School
- Pacific Grove High School
- Pacific Point Christian Academy
- Palma High School
- Santa Catalina School
- Soledad High School
- Stevenson School
- Trinity Christian High School
- York School
