= Jorge Elorduy =

Spanish basketball coach

Dorados de Chihuahua
- Position: Head coach
- League: LNBP

Personal information
- Born: 3 June 1970 (age 56) Bilbao, Spain
- Coaching career: 2000–present

Career history

Coaching
- 2000–2001: SD Patronato Bilbao
- 2001–2002: CB Calpe Aguas de Calpe
- 2002–2003: Bilbao Basket (Assistant)
- 2003–2004: Santurtzi SK
- 2004–2006: Cantabria Lobos
- 2006–2008: Gijón Baloncesto
- 2009–2011: Club Melilla Baloncesto
- 2011: Paraguay (women)
- 2011–2013: Santurtzi SK
- 2013–2014: Club Libertad
- 2014–2015: Paraguay (women)
- 2015–2017: Club Sol de América
- 2016: Paraguay (women)
- 2017–2018: Club Deportivo Promete
- 2018–2019: Bilbao Basket (Assistant)
- 2019: Santurtzi SK
- 2019–2020: CB Tizona
- 2021: Ourense (Assistant)
- 2021–2022: Astros de Jalisco (Assistant)
- 2023: Astros de Jalisco
- 2025–present: Dorados de Chihuahua

Jorge Elorduy Astigarraga (born 3 June 1970) is a Spanish basketball coach. He is the head coach of the Dorados de Chihuahua.

== Coaching career ==
Elorduy started his coaching career in Spain with SD Patronato Bilbao. In the 2019 season, he joined CB Tizona. In 2023 he joined Astros de Jalisco, where he won the 2023 CIBACOPA championship. On 2025, Elorduy signed with the Dorados de Chihuahua .
