= San Lázaro =

- San Lázaro
- Location in Paraguay
- Coordinates: 22°06′30″S 57°58′12″W
- Country: Paraguay
- Department: Concepción
- Founded: 1930
- Founder: Captain Lázaro Aranda

Government
  - Mayor: Celso Ovelar Daspett

Area
  - Total: 1,005 km^{2} (388 sq mi)
- Elevation: 112 m (367 ft)

Population (2016)
  - Total: 11,509
  - Density: 11.45/km^{2} (29.66/sq mi)
- Postal code: 8940
- Area code: (595)(351)
- Climate: Am

San Lázaro is a town in the Concepción department of Paraguay. Located 660 km from Asunción and 190 km from departmental capital Concepción, its population was 9060 in 2002.

Located at the confluence of rivers Paraguay and Apa. The main area of activity is the manufacture of lime.

== Geography ==
San Lázaro is 660 km far from Asunción and is located at the exact site of the confluence of the Apa River with Paraguay River, bordering Brazil - Chaco.

== Weather ==
The maximum temperature reaches 40 C in summer, while the minimum at least until winter is -2 °C. The average is 24 °C.

There are copious periods of rainfall from November to January, however the driest months are from June to September. Winds are from the north, east and southeast.

== Demography ==
San Lázaro has a total of 9,060 inhabitants, from whom 4,719 are men and 4,382 women, according to 2002 Census by the General Directorate of Statistics, Census and Surveys.

== Economy ==
The main town in this district is Vallemí, located 14 km further south, where the quarry of the largest cement company of Paraguay, the National Cement Industry (INC).

The main economic activities are extracting limestone and marble, there are about 40 plants. San Lázaro is known as "City of Calera."

It is also recognized by the large number of mountains of grapefruit.

== History ==
Founded in 1930 by Captain Lázaro Aranda, at the same place Apa River joins Paraguay River. San Lazaro was the first little town named as itself district as capital.

== Tourism ==
On the Apa River there are several spas, as well as a lookout way in Vallemí to appreciate the scenery.

In honor of its founder stand the Church of Saint Lazarus and the monument from the main square of the city. In the home craftsman, Sebastian Amarilla presents sculptures of different styles, in addition to the "Monument to the Supreme" located alongside the access factory lime, as well as "Children Martyrs Acosta Nu" in downtown the town, belong to this talented craftsman. The Church of the Our Lady of Fatima has coated the walls of marble and limestone.

In the 'Mountains of Fifteen' Tips there are still unexplored forests and hills whose heights reaching 500 m, the tops are born in streams, rivers and streams. In the Hill St. Helena, from within San Lázaro and Vallemí, visitors can view the natural environment. Grapefruit is also available, as the main product of the area.

There are limestone caves in San Lázaro, the Cave "Cambá hopo", 300 meters from the factory, south of Vallemí on the Paraguay River, "Itá Cajón", with a height between 5 and 6 m , and a width 9 between 10, 11 m. Often, people get to the place by boat or on foot with guides.

The Cave of San Lazaro, "Cantera 54", northeast of Vallemí and east of San Lázaro, has more than 15 deep wells and large ground, three of them you can see the roots of trees embedded in the walls of the cave. The roof can be seen traces of waves of the past.

"Tres Cerros" cave located 12 km southeast of Vallemí, the second in the hills of the same name, is well known for its easy access, you can see the old root of a tree and stalactites, stalagmites and columns. The "Holy Cave," in the first hill on the west side of Three Hills, bears this name because in it there is a stalagmite from 45 to 50 cm in the shape of a virgin, according to the locals. The entrance to the cave is vertical and drops about 6 meters, is one of more impressive because it possesses huge stalactites of more than 6 m long. There are many visitors as researchers, scientists and students.

The "Calera Rusa" located on private property and open to the public, 16 km from Vallemí and 4 km from the Tres Cerros, which main characteristic is that it is open pit and walls 70 meters. Within the Calera you can see the huge root of a tree, in addition to stalactites, small rocks and shells on the floor and walls.

In September or October is the "Festival Apa River", on December 17 is the patronal feast in honor of San Lázaro.

The Estancia Tres Hermanas is 6 km from the main route offers a view to Apa River, amid lush forests, grasslands and prairies. The stay may be camping, horseback riding and milking.
