= Everett Alvarez High School =

Location
- 1900 Independence Blvd., Salinas, CA 93906; 36.71232°N 121.61593°W

Information
- Opened: 1995
- School district: Salinas Union High School District
- Principal: Miguel Ocampo
- Teaching staff: 93.40 (FTE)
- Grades: 9-12
- Enrollment: 2,072 (2023-2024)
- Student to teacher ratio: 22.18
- Colors: Navy blue, Vegas gold
- Athletics conference: Monterey Bay League of Central Coast Section, California Interscholastic Federation
- Team name: Eagles
- Website: eahs.salinasuhsd.org

Everett Alvarez High School is a public high school established in Salinas, California. The school is named in honor of Everett Alvarez, Jr., a much-decorated former U.S. Navy Commander and the 2nd longest held prisoner of war.

== Location ==
The school is located in the north-east quadrant of the city of Salinas. Originally constructed during city trends of inter-racial violence, the school honors its commitment to safety with an onsite Naval office. Its mascot is the Eagle, and Navy Blue and Vegas Gold are the school colors.

== History ==
When the school opened in 1995, the student body contained only freshmen and sophomores. The first class to graduate was in 1998, and the first class to graduate attending all four years of high school was the class of 1999. Today, 1800+ students attend grades 9-12th. The school has a multitude of programs: NJROTC, the International Agribusiness Academy, which prepares students for the working world and with interests in the world of agriculture, the Digital Media Arts Academy, a set of classes that helps explore the creativity and the blooming technology aspects of art, and the Link Crew Program, which specializes in welcoming incoming freshmen in a new environment. Along with that, the Leadership class at Alvarez plans dances and other activities including: homecoming, the back to school mixer, prom, academic excellence breakfast, and powderpuff. The school is the only one in Northern California to have a Lou Gehrig Disease awareness program, the End ALS team, be nationally recognized by the Tokyo ALS Foundation for their student organized ALS Color Run. The school’s Interact service club is also recognized statewide for their remarkable efforts boasting the 2018 Regional Philanthropy Award and the 2017 Presidential Rotaract Citation. The club raised over $18,000 for the Wendy Baker Memorial Fund in 2018 alone.

== Statistics ==
Everett Alvarez High School is a Title 1 institution with a yearly teacher turnover rate of 33%, a graduation rate of 79%, and a state-recorded drop-out rate over 20%, one of the highest in the nation. It ranks in the lowest 25th percentile of both the national education index for public schools and the California state index. Alvarez has seen significant improvements in its safety ranking increasing 75% since 2012, although the school population is still victim to bouts of youth crime and homicide. 98% of students at Alvarez are on free/reduced lunch with over 35% of the school population living below the national poverty line. As of 2016, all students are required to participate in violence response & prevention training meeting ALICE assault and shooter-response guidelines. Alvarez offers state-mandated counseling as well as the “Safety Nest,” a preventive measure by the school board to address mental health concerns of the students. Everett Alvarez ranks 7,180th nationally as of the most recent U.S. News & World Report. The percentage of students achieving proficiency in math is 18% (which is lower than the California state average of 39%) for the 2017-18 school year. The percentage of students achieving proficiency in reading/language arts is 51% (higher than the California state average of 50%) for the 2017-18 school year.

== Demographics and social justice work ==
Minority enrollment at Alvarez is 92% with a student population of majority Hispanic at 72% as well as having a significant Asian population at 26%. Prominent ethnic groups include a large Mexican demographic as well as Argentine, Puerto Rican, Central American, Filipino, Vietnamese, Cantonese/other Chinese, Japanese, and Central Asians forming significant numbers. The school had a very significant Eastern European population around the time of its opening. The school’s Baile Folklorico team and Tinikling teams are highly rated citywide performing at multiple cultural events. The school also boasts many clubs reflecting its cultural diversity with a Japanese Club, Spanish Club, Argentine Society, Mexican Folklore Club, Filipino Club, Liberty in North Korea Team, DREAM Academy Club, AVID, PUENTE, GEAR-UP, and many others. The school is ranked as the 3rd safest school in Salinas, seeing drastic improvements from the controversial gang violence between its Mexican and Vietnamese communities in the late 1990s to early 2000s. Everett Alvarez offers a depth of faculty to student/parental support with an individualized focus in supporting migrant families. The school is only one of two in Monterey County to offer translators in Spanish, Japanese, Filipino, Cantonese, and even the indigenous Oaxacan languages of Mixteco and Nahuatl.

In response to growing racial tensions and national recognition for Salinas’s educational resource disparities, Everett Alvarez is home to several successful youth empowerment and educational success programs. The University of California, Berkeley implemented its PUENTE educational program there as did California State University, Monterey Bay’s GEAR-UP branch. The school also has an integrated AVID program as of the late 2010s, implemented in reaction to the school’s graduate college-going rate of 8% (as noted by the City’s Board of Education.). The AVID and PUENTE program are modeled after and given support by the Freedom Writers Foundation.

== Sport ==
Everett Alvarez High School has sports programs such as tennis, volleyball, basketball, football, badminton, water polo, golf, and baseball. The school’s athletic department provides consistent state contenders for wrestling, swimming, and both track and field events.

== Notable alumni ==
- Nick Duron (born 1996), former MLB pitcher
- Ruben Villa (born 1997), featherweight boxer
