= Monte Vista Christian School =

Location
- 2 School Way; Watsonville, California 95076; USA

Information
- Type: Private
- Motto: "Fidei Defensor" (Latin) Defender of Faith
- Established: 1926
- Head of school: Nikki Daniels
- Grades: 4-12
- Enrollment: 820 (2025)
- Average class size: 17 (2023)
- Campus: Rural
- Colors: Blue, Black, and White
- Athletics conference: CIF Central Coast Section
- Mascot: Mustang
- Website: http://www.mvcs.org/

Monte Vista Christian School, (also known as MVC) is a private, co-educational, selective day and boarding Christian school for young men and women in grades 4 through 12, offering a college-preparatory education in the Christian tradition and context. Founded in 1926, MVCS is fully accredited by the Western Association of Schools and Colleges (WASC) and the Association of Christian Schools International (ACSI).

== Other ==
- The school colors are blue, black, and white.
- The school mascot is the mustang.
- The school offers a boarding program for students who wish to live on campus while attending MVCS.
- Monte Vista has received their IB (International Baccalaureate) program, transitioning away from the AP program. They are the first Christian school in the United States with a middle and high school with the IB program.
