= Ángeles de la Ciudad de México =

- League: CIBACOPA
- Founded: 26 September 2023; 2 years ago
- Arena: Gimnasio Olímpico Juan de la Barrera
- Capacity: 5,242
- Location: Mexico City, Mexico
- Team colors: Orange, blue and black
- President: Francisco José Búrquez
- Head coach: Enrique Zúñiga
- Website: https://angelesdelacdmx.com/
Home	Away

The Ángeles de la Ciudad de México (English: Mexico City Angels) are a Mexican professional basketball team based in Mexico City. The Ángeles are members of the Circuito de Baloncesto de la Costa del Pacífico (CIBACOPA) and play their games in the Gimnasio Olímpico Juan de la Barrera.

== History ==
On 26 September 2023, the team was presented at a press conference as an expansion team in the Circuito de Baloncesto de la Costa del Pacífico (CIBACOPA). The Ángeles were one of two teams joining the league ahead of its 2024 season, along with the returning Frayles de Guasave, bringing the number of teams to 10. The team president, Francisco José Búrquez, is the nephew of Mexican basketball legend Carlos Quintanar. In December, the Ángeles hired Gustavo Quintero as the team's inaugural head coach and announced DaQuan Bracey as their first signing. The team subsequently signed Luis Andriassi and Vander Blue in January 2024.

The Ángeles released their inaugural 12-man roster on 20 February.

== Players ==
=== Current roster ===
Note: Flags indicate national team eligibility at FIBA-sanctioned events. Players may hold other non-FIBA nationalities not displayed.

Ángeles de la Ciudad de México roster
Players
Coaches

Pos.	No.	Nat.	Name	Ht.
PF	1	(United States)	Ohams, Chuba	2.06 m (6 ft 9 in)
SF	2	(United States)	Griffin, Dayon	1.94 m (6 ft 4 in)
SG	3	(United States)	Cleveland III, Frederick	1.74 m (5 ft 9 in)
PG	11	(Mexico)	Andriassi, Luis	1.83 m (6 ft 0 in)
SF	13	(Mexico)	Coria, Jesús	2.04 m (6 ft 8 in)
SF	20	(Mexico)	Rodríguez, Ricardo	2.01 m (6 ft 7 in)
SF	22	(Mexico)	Ficachi, Dominick	1.94 m (6 ft 4 in)
SF	24	(United States)	Davenport, Jeremiah	2.01 m (6 ft 7 in)
C	25	(Ukraine)	Konstantynovskyi, Nikita	2.08 m (6 ft 10 in)
PG	32	(United States)	Bracey, DaQuan	1.80 m (5 ft 11 in)
SF	45	(United States)	Burrell, Trahson	2.01 m (6 ft 7 in)

Head coach

- (Mexico) Enrique Zúñiga

Assistant coach(es)

- (Mexico) Miguel Ángel Suárez Núñez

Legend

- (C) Team captain
- (I) Import player
- Injured

== Notable players ==
Note: Flags indicate national team eligibility at FIBA-sanctioned events. Players may hold other non-FIBA nationalities not displayed.

Criteria

To appear in this section a player must have either:

- Set a club record or won an individual award while at the club
- Played at least one official international match for their national team at any time
- Played at least one official NBA match at any time.

- (United States) Vander Blue
