= Pioneros de Los Mochis =

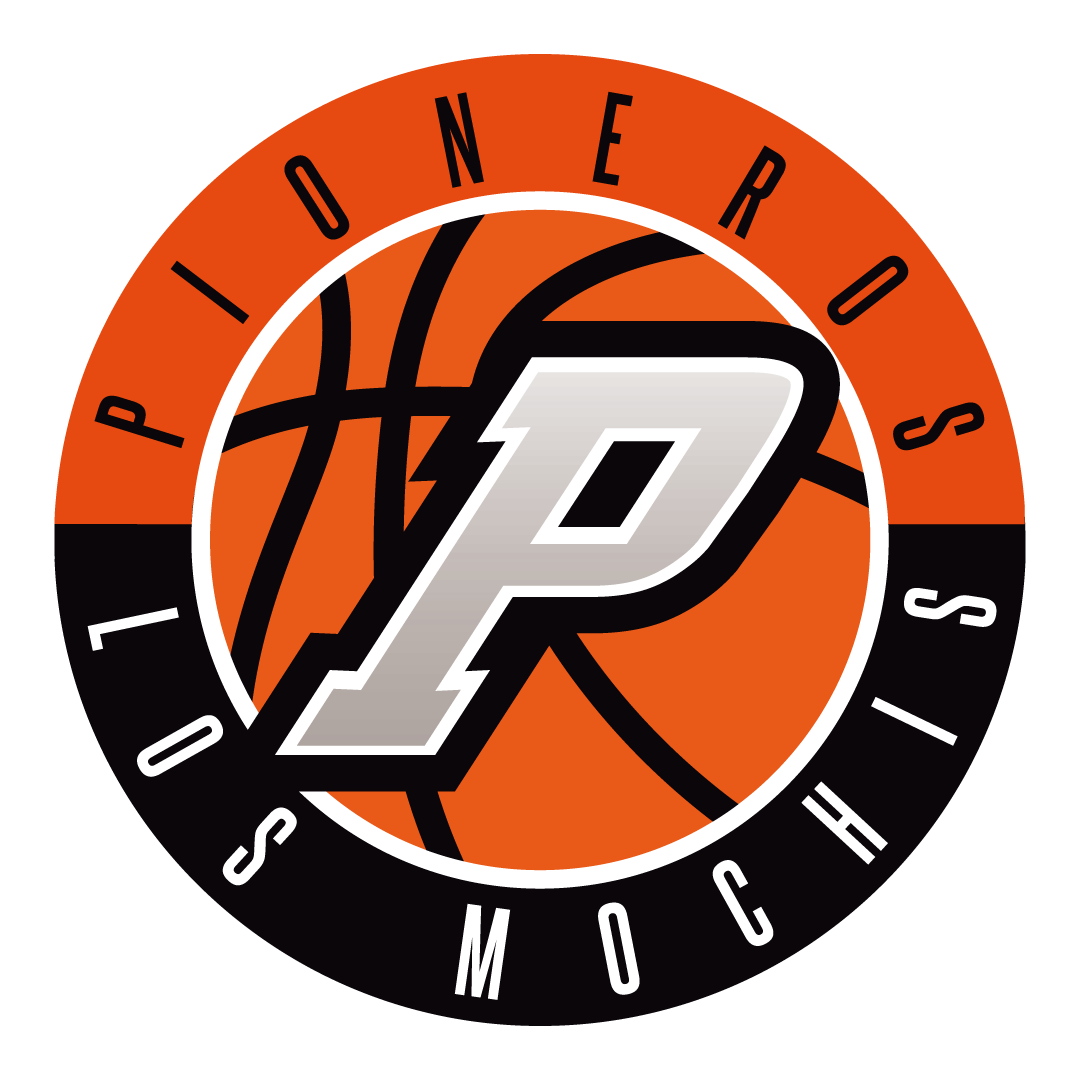
- League: CIBACOPA
- Founded: 1996; 30 years ago
- Arena: Centro de Usos Múltiples de Los Mochis
- Capacity: 5,830
- Location: Los Mochis, Sinaloa, Mexico
- Team colors: Orange, Black, and Silver
- President: Julio César Leyva Arredondo
- Head coach: Jhovanny García
Home	Away	Third

Pioneros de Los Mochis (English: Los Mochis Pioneers) are a Mexican professional basketball team based in Los Mochis, Sinaloa. The Pioneros de Los Mochis are members of the CIBACOPA and play their games in the Centro de Usos Múltiples de Los Mochis.

== History ==
Pioneros of Los Mochis began its formal operations in 1996, participating in various basketball promotion activities through municipal and state selections in youth categories, as well as social responsibility actions in partnership with clubs, schools, colleges, and non-profit civil society organizations throughout the northern part of the state of Sinaloa, Mexico.

In 2001, with the birth of a new era for the Pacific Coast Basketball Circuit CIBACOPA, a league that in the 1980s marked significant development for this sport throughout the northwest of Mexico, conditions were promoted for a group of enthusiastic promoters and entrepreneurs from Sinaloa to focus on reactivating this Circuit. Pioneros de Los Mochis, alongside its main promoters, the renowned coach Jaime Leyva and his brothers, representing the entire Leyva Arredondo family as the foundation of Pioneros, were pioneers and a fundamental part of starting this project. Together with the Caballeros de Culiacán, Delfines de Mazatlán, Frayles de Guasave, Lobos Marinos de La Paz, and Paisas de Los Cabos clubs, they coordinated to carry out the first official season of the circuit in 2001.

Since then, more clubs have joined CIBACOPA, expanding to over 20 locations that have hosted teams and games from the league, covering the extensive territory in the states of Sinaloa, Baja California Sur, Sonora, Baja California, Nayarit, Durango, Jalisco, and Aguascalientes.

Currently, CIBACOPA is made up of 10 active clubs. It is worth noting that the franchise of Club Pioneros de Los Mochis is the only one that has remained since the beginning of the league, with its original management and some new partners who have joined to enrich the project.

Venados hired American coach Derrick Alston as the team head coach in late April 2024.

== Players ==
=== Current roster ===
Note: Flags indicate national team eligibility at FIBA-sanctioned events. Players may hold other non-FIBA nationalities not displayed.

Pioneros de Los Mochis roster
Players
Coaches

Pos.	No.	Nat.	Name	Ht.	Age
SG	0	(United States)	Wilson-Frame, Jared	1.96 m (6 ft 5 in)	30 – 13 July 1996
PG	4	(Mexico)	Rojo, Miguel	1.82 m (6 ft 0 in)	21 – 7 February 2005
G	5	(Mexico)	Heredia, Jesús	1.88 m (6 ft 2 in)	23 – 16 June 2003
PG	6	(United States)	Evans, Jawun	1.83 m (6 ft 0 in)	29 – 26 July 1996
PF	7	(United States)	Griffin, Eric	2.03 m (6 ft 8 in)	36 – 26 May 1990
SF	10	(United States)	Anderson, Alphonso	1.98 m (6 ft 6 in)	28 – 10 October 1997
C	11	(United States)	Moultrie, Arnett	2.08 m (6 ft 10 in)	35 – 18 November 1990
SF	13	(Mexico)	Sánchez, Eliher	2.01 m (6 ft 7 in)	24 – 18 October 2001
C	14	(Mexico)	Martínez, Irving	2.07 m (6 ft 9 in)	26 – 11 December 1999
PG	15	(Mexico)	Juárez, Ricardo	1.76 m (5 ft 9 in)	21 – 15 February 2005
SG	21	(Mexico)	Estrada, José	1.93 m (6 ft 4 in)	32 – 15 February 1994
SG	23	(United States)	Butler, Matthew	1.88 m (6 ft 2 in)	31 – 3 February 1995
PF	44	(United States)	Alexander, Kwame	2.01 m (6 ft 7 in)	36 – 21 April 1990
G	55	(United States)	Allen, Jordan	1.93 m (6 ft 4 in)	28 – 19 March 1998

Head coach

- (Mexico) Jhovanny García

Assistant coach(es)

- (Argentina) Marcelo Rafael Elusich
- (Mexico) José Luis Ruiz

Legend

- (C) Team captain
- (I) Import player
- Injured

- Roster
