= Dorados de Chihuahua (basketball) =

Professional team of basketball in Mexico

- League: LNBP; LBE
- Founded: 1931
- History: Dorados de Chihuahua (1931–present)
- Arena: Gimnasio Manuel Bernardo Aguirre
- Capacity: 9,600
- Location: Chihuahua City, Chihuahua, Mexico
- Team colors: Purple, gold and black
- President: Anwar Mauricio Elías Ortíz
- Head coach: Jorge Elorduy
- Ownership: List: Anwar Mauricio Elías Ortíz, Sergio Carlos Mares de Alsuper, Víctor Almeida, Óscar Eugenio Baeza
- Championships: 8 (LBE) (2015, 2016, 2017, 2019, 2021, 2022, 2024, 2025)
- Website: Official site
Home	Away	Third

The Dorados de Chihuahua (Chihuahua Golden) is a Mexican professional basketball team based in Chihuahua, Chihuahua, Mexico playing in the East Division of the Liga Nacional de Baloncesto Profesional (LNBP). Their home arena is the Gimnasio Manuel Bernardo Aguirre. The president is Anwar Elias Ortiz.

== Players ==
=== Current roster ===
Note: Flags indicate national team eligibility at FIBA-sanctioned events. Players may hold other non-FIBA nationalities not displayed.

Dorados de Chihuahua roster
Players
Coaches

Pos.	No.	Nat.	Name	Ht.	Age
SF	0	(United States)	Cummings, Markeith	1.98 m (6 ft 6 in)	37 – 21 December 1988
F	1	(United States)	Trice, Austin	2.01 m (6 ft 7 in)	28 – 17 October 1997
SG	2	(Mexico)	Estrada, José	1.90 m (6 ft 3 in)	32 – 15 February 1994
PG	4	(United States)	Clay, Jr.	1.82 m (6 ft 0 in)	26 – 23 February 2000
PG	5	(United States)	House, Jaden	1.92 m (6 ft 4 in)	24 – 16 November 2001
PG	9	(Mexico)	Bernal, Iván	1.88 m (6 ft 2 in)	24 – 29 June 2002
SG	11	(Mexico)	Valdéz, Ricardo	1.95 m (6 ft 5 in)	31 – 23 May 1995
PF	13	(United States)	Chapman, Clint	2.08 m (6 ft 10 in)	37 – 6 March 1989
F/C	14	(United States) (Somalia)	Mohamed, Yusuf	2.07 m (6 ft 9 in)	27 – 5 November 1998
SG	17	(Mexico)	Santana, Saúl	1.85 m (6 ft 1 in)	29 – 1 June 1997
PG	22	(United States)	McKinney, Mikh	1.84 m (6 ft 0 in)	34 – 26 January 1992
F/C	23	(United States) (Democratic Republic of the Congo)	Wembi, Emmanuel	2.06 m (6 ft 9 in)	28 – 24 October 1997
PF	26	(United States)	Spalding, Ray	2.06 m (6 ft 9 in)	29 – 11 March 1997
PG	29	(United States)	Cherry, Will	1.85 m (6 ft 1 in)	35 – 8 February 1991
F/C	33	(Mexico)	Murillo, José	2.06 m (6 ft 9 in)	23 – 6 June 2003

Head coach

- (Spain) Jorge Elorduy

Assistant coach(es)

- (Argentina) Santiago Belza
- (Spain) Alex Torralba

Legend

- (C) Team captain
- Injured

- Roster
Updated: 15 September 2026

== Notable players ==
- (United States) D. J. Cooper
- (Mexico) José Estrada
- (United States) Bryce Washington
- (Mexico) Ricardo Valdéz
