= Zonkey =

Zonkey may refer to:

- Zonkey (zebroid), a donkey crossed with a zebra
- Zonkey (Tijuana), donkeys painted with zebra stripes in Tijuana, Mexico
- The Tijuana Zonkeys basketball team
- Zonkey (album), an Umphrey's McGee album
