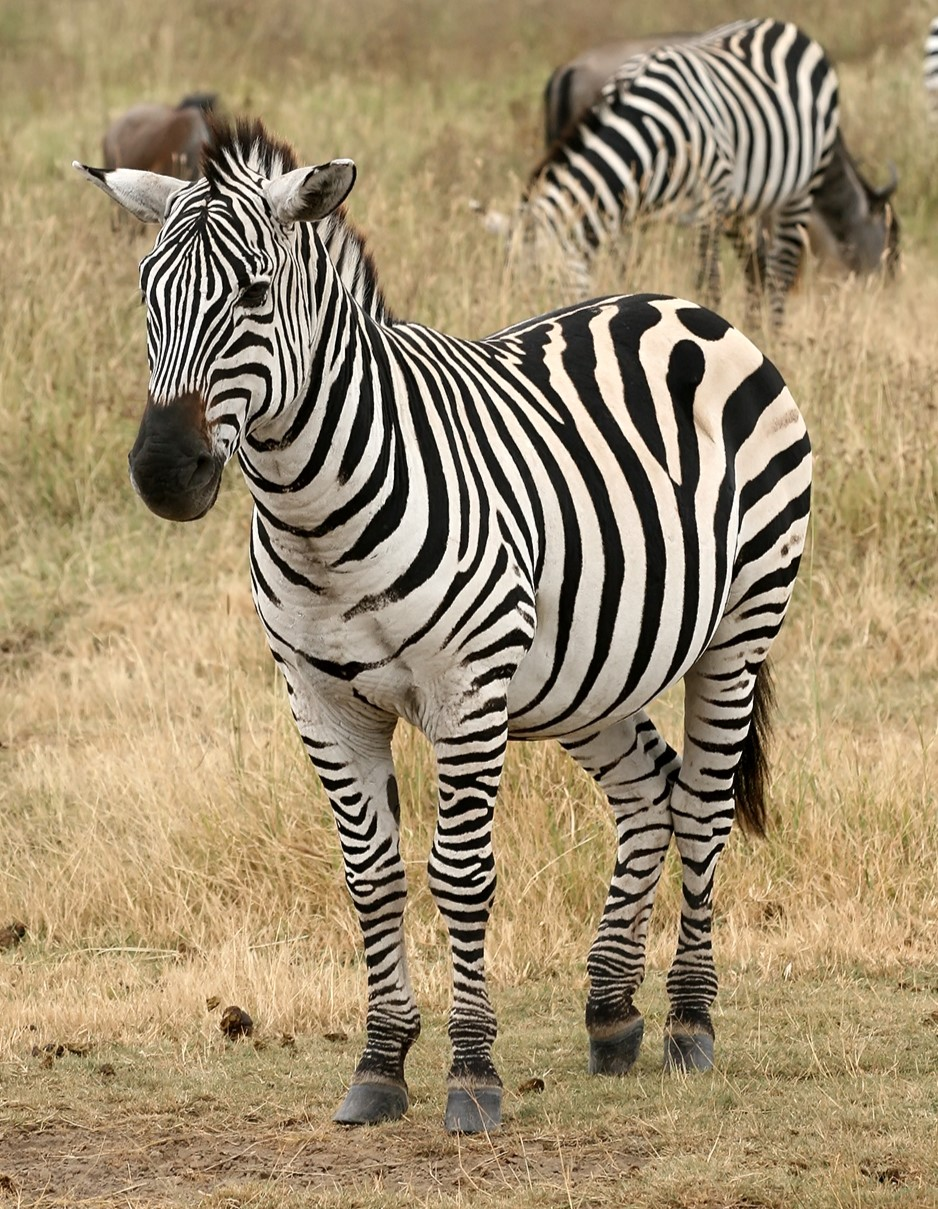
- A plains zebra (Equus quagga) among a herd in the Ngorongoro Crater in Tanzania

Scientific classification
- Kingdom: Animalia
- Phylum: Chordata
- Class: Mammalia
- Order: Perissodactyla
- Family: Equidae
- Genus: Equus
- Subgenus: Hippotigris; C. H. Smith, 1841

Species
- †E. capensis E. grevyi †E. mauritanicus †E. oldowayensis E. quagga E. zebra
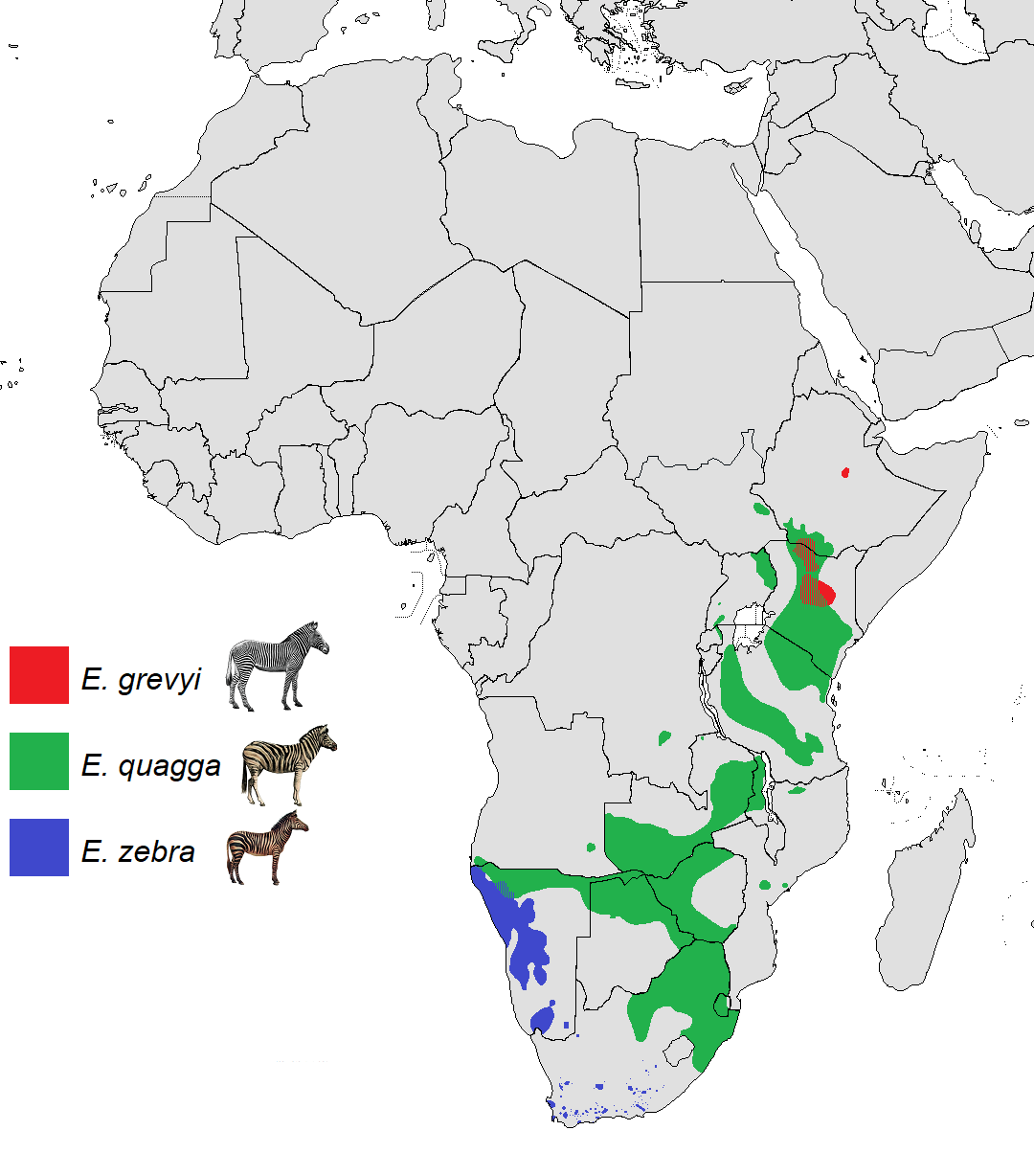
- Modern range of the three living zebra species

= Zebra =

Zebra Temporal range: 2–0 Ma Pleistocene–present

Striped animal in the equid family

Zebras (US: /ˈziːbrəz/, UK: /ˈzɛbrəz, ˈziː-/) (subgenus Hippotigris) are African equines with distinctive black-and-white striped coats. There are three living species: Grévy's zebra (Equus grevyi), the plains zebra (E. quagga), and the mountain zebra (E. zebra). Zebras share the genus Equus with horses and asses, the three groups being the only living members of the family Equidae. Zebra stripes come in different patterns, unique to each individual. Several theories have been proposed for the function of these patterns, with most evidence supporting them as a deterrent for biting flies. Zebras inhabit eastern and southern Africa and can be found in a variety of habitats such as savannahs, grasslands, woodlands, shrublands, and mountainous areas.

Zebras are primarily grazers and can subsist on lower-quality vegetation. They are preyed on mainly by lions, and typically flee when threatened but also bite and kick. Zebra species differ in social behaviour, with plains and mountain zebra living in stable harems consisting of an adult male or stallion, several adult females or mares, and their young or foals; while Grévy's zebra live alone or in loosely associated herds. In harem-holding species, adult females mate only with their harem stallion, while male Grévy's zebras establish territories which attract females and the species is promiscuous. Zebras communicate with various vocalisations, body postures and facial expressions. Social grooming strengthens social bonds in plains and mountain zebras.

Zebras' distinctive stripes make them among the most recognisable mammals. They have been featured in art and stories in Africa and beyond. Historically, they have been highly sought by exotic animal collectors, but unlike horses and donkeys, zebras have never been completely domesticated. The International Union for Conservation of Nature (IUCN) lists Grévy's zebra as endangered, the mountain zebra as vulnerable and the plains zebra as near-threatened. The quagga (E. quagga quagga), a type of plains zebra, was driven to extinction in the 19th century. Nevertheless, zebras can be found in numerous protected areas.

== Etymology ==
The English name "zebra" derives from Italian, Spanish or Portuguese. Its origins may lie in the Latin equiferus, meaning "wild horse". Equiferus appears to have entered into Portuguese as ezebro or zebro, which was originally used for a mysterious equine reported in the wilds of the Iberian Peninsula during the Middle Ages. In 1591, Italian explorer Filippo Pigafetta recorded "zebra" being used to refer to the African animals by Portuguese visitors to the continent. In ancient times, the zebra was called hippotigris ("horse tiger") by the Greeks and Romans.

The word zebra was traditionally pronounced with a long initial vowel, but over the course of the 20th century the pronunciation with the short initial vowel became the norm in British English. The pronunciation with a long initial vowel remains standard in American English.

== Taxonomy ==
Zebras are classified in the genus Equus (known as equines) along with horses and asses. These three groups are the only living members of the family Equidae. The plains zebra and mountain zebra were traditionally placed in the subgenus Hippotigris (C. H. Smith, 1841) in contrast to the Grévy's zebra which was considered the sole species of subgenus Dolichohippus (Heller, 1912). Groves and Bell (2004) placed all three species in the subgenus Hippotigris. A 2013 phylogenetic study found that the plains zebra is more closely related to Grévy's zebras than mountain zebras. The extinct quagga was originally classified as a distinct species. Later genetic studies have placed it as the same species as the plains zebra, either a subspecies or just the southernmost population. Molecular evidence supports zebras as a monophyletic lineage.

Equus originated in North America and direct paleogenomic sequencing of a 700,000-year-old middle Pleistocene horse metapodial bone from Canada implies a date of 4.07 million years ago (mya) for the most recent common ancestor of the equines within a range of 4.0 to 4.5 mya. Horses split from asses and zebras around this time and equines colonised Eurasia and Africa around 2.1–3.4 mya. Zebras and asses diverged from each other close to 2 mya. The mountain zebra diverged from the other species around 1.6 mya and the plains and Grévy's zebra split 1.4 mya.

A 2017 mitochondrial DNA study placed the Eurasian Equus ovodovi and the subgenus Sussemionus lineage as closer to zebras than to asses. However, other studies disputed this placement, finding the Sussemionus lineage basal to the zebra+asses group, but suggested that the Sussemionus lineage may have received gene flow from zebras.

The cladogram of Equus below is based on Vilstrup and colleagues (2013) and Jónsson and colleagues (2014):

- Equus
  - - - Zebras
        - Mountain zebra (E. zebra)
        - - Plains zebra (E. quagga)
          - Grévy's zebra (E. grevyi)
      - Wild asses
        - - Kiang (E. kiang)
          - Onager (E. hemionus)
        - African wild ass (E. africanus)
  - Horses
    - Horse (E. ferus caballus)
    - Przewalski's horse (E. ferus przewalski)

=== Extant species ===
Name	Dimensions	Description	Distribution	Subspecies	Chromosomes	Image
Grévy's zebra (Equus grevyi)	Body length: 250–300 cm (98–118 in); Tail length: 38–75 cm (15–30 in); Shoulder height: 125–160 cm (49–63 in); Weight: 352–450 kg (776–992 lb).	Thin, elongated skull, robust neck and conical ears; narrow striping pattern with concentric rump stripes, white belly and tail base and white line around the ashy muzzle.	Eastern Africa including the Horn; arid and semiarid grasslands and shrublands.	Monotypic	46	
Plains zebra (Equus quagga)	Body length: 217–246 cm (85–97 in); Tail length: 47–56 cm (19–22 in); Shoulder height: 110–145 cm (43–57 in); Weight: 175–385 kg (386–849 lb).	Thick bodied with relatively short legs and an obtusely shaped skull profile with a protruding forehead and a more recessed nose area; broad stripes, horizontal on the rump, with northern populations having more extensive striping while populations further south have whiter legs and bellies and more brown "shadow" stripes while the snout is black.	Eastern and southern Africa; savannahs, grasslands and open woodlands.	6 or monotypic	44	
Mountain zebra (Equus zebra)	Body length: 210–260 cm (83–102 in); Tail length: 40–55 cm (16–22 in); Shoulder height: 116–146 cm (46–57 in); Weight: 204–430 kg (450–948 lb).	Eye sockets more circular and positioned farther back, a squarer nuchal crest, dewlap present under neck and compact hooves; stripes intermediate in width between the other species, with gridiron and horizontal stripes on the rump, while the belly is white and the black muzzle is lined with chestnut or orange.	Southwestern Africa; mountains, rocky uplands and Karoo shrubland.	2	32	

=== Fossil record ===
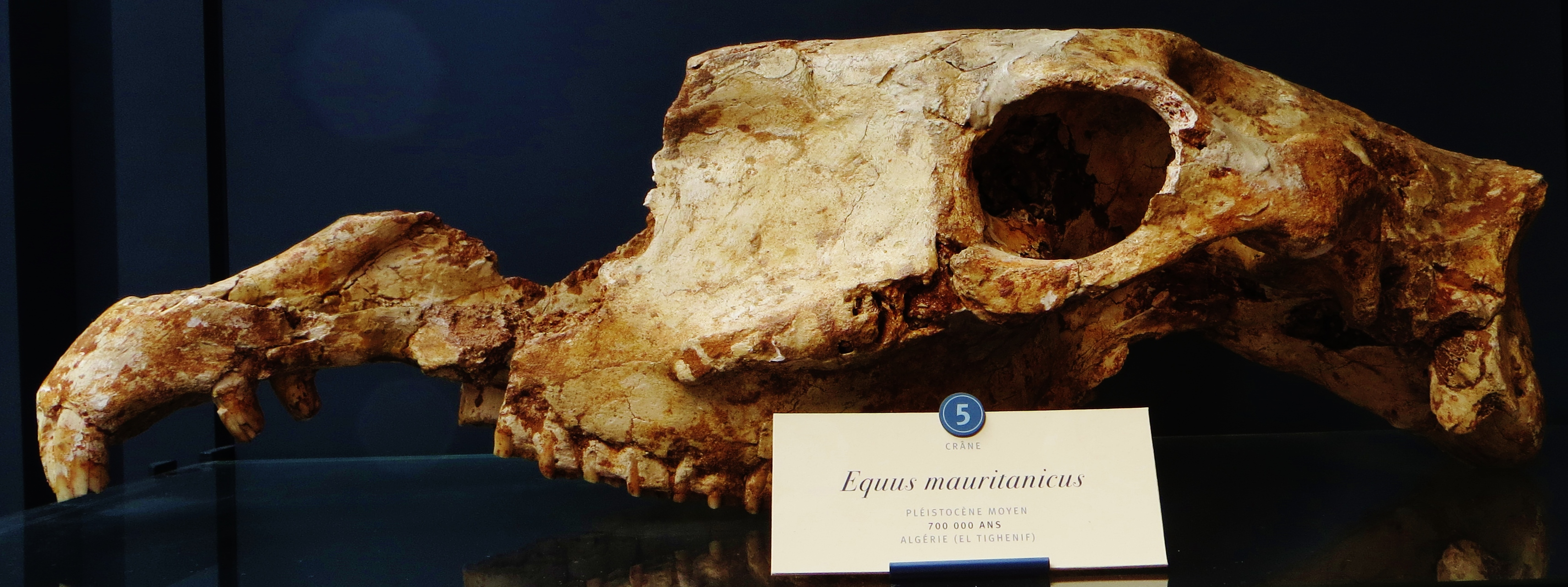
Fossil skull of Equus mauritanicus

In addition to the three living species, some fossil zebras and relatives have also been identified. E. oldowayensis is identified from remains in Olduvai Gorge dating to 1.8 mya. Fossil skulls of E. mauritanicus from Algeria which date to around 1 mya appears to show affinities with the plains zebra. E. capensis, known as the Cape zebra, appeared around 2 mya and lived throughout southern and eastern Africa.

=== Hybridisation ===
Fertile hybrids have been reported in the wild between plains and Grévy's zebra. Hybridisation has also been recorded between the plains and mountain zebra, though it is possible that these are infertile due to the difference in chromosome numbers between the two species. Captive zebras have been bred with horses and donkeys; these are known as zebroids. A zorse is a cross between a zebra and a horse; a zonkey, between a zebra and a donkey; and a zoni, between a zebra and a pony. Zebroids are often born sterile with dwarfism.

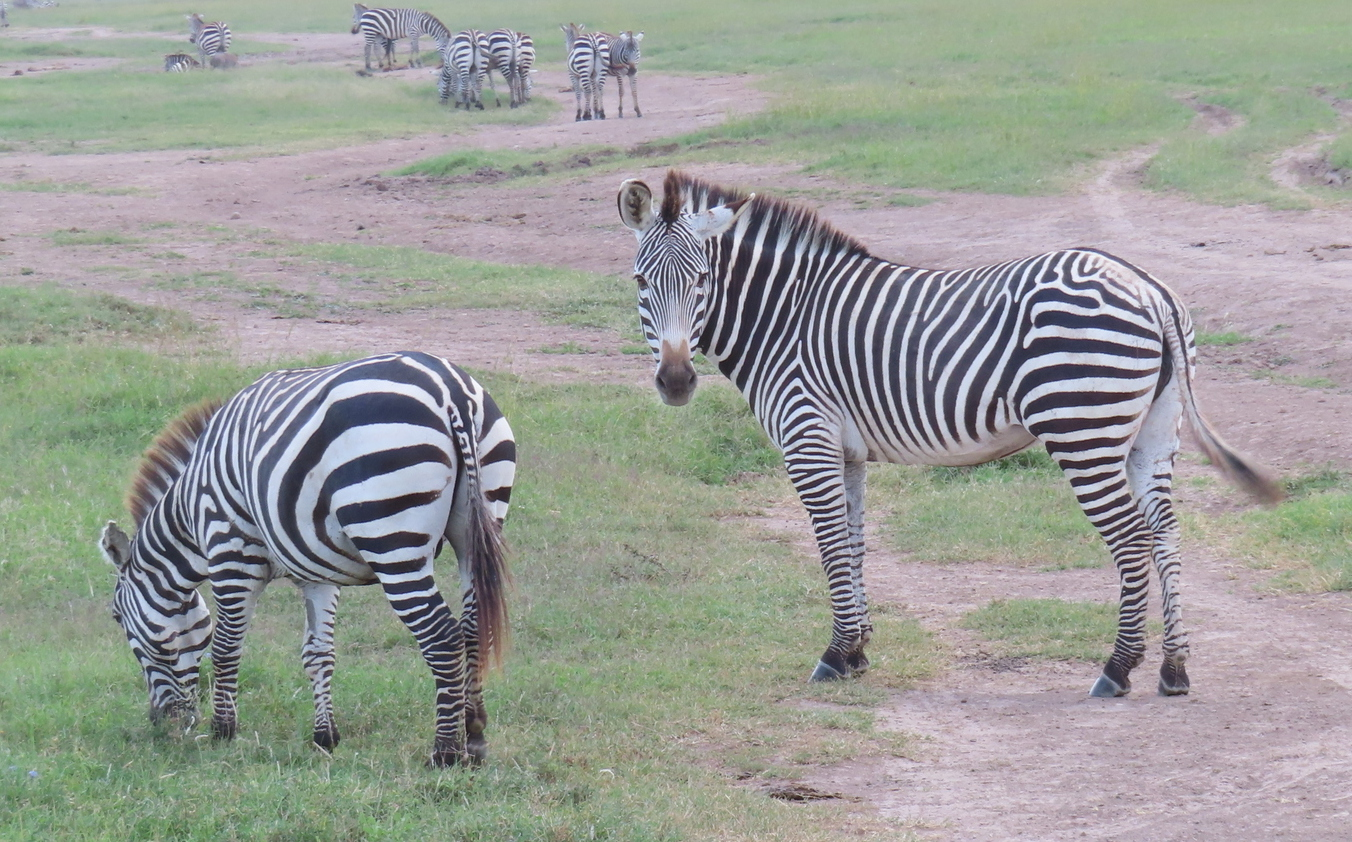
Grévy's × plains zebra hybrid, alongside plains zebras

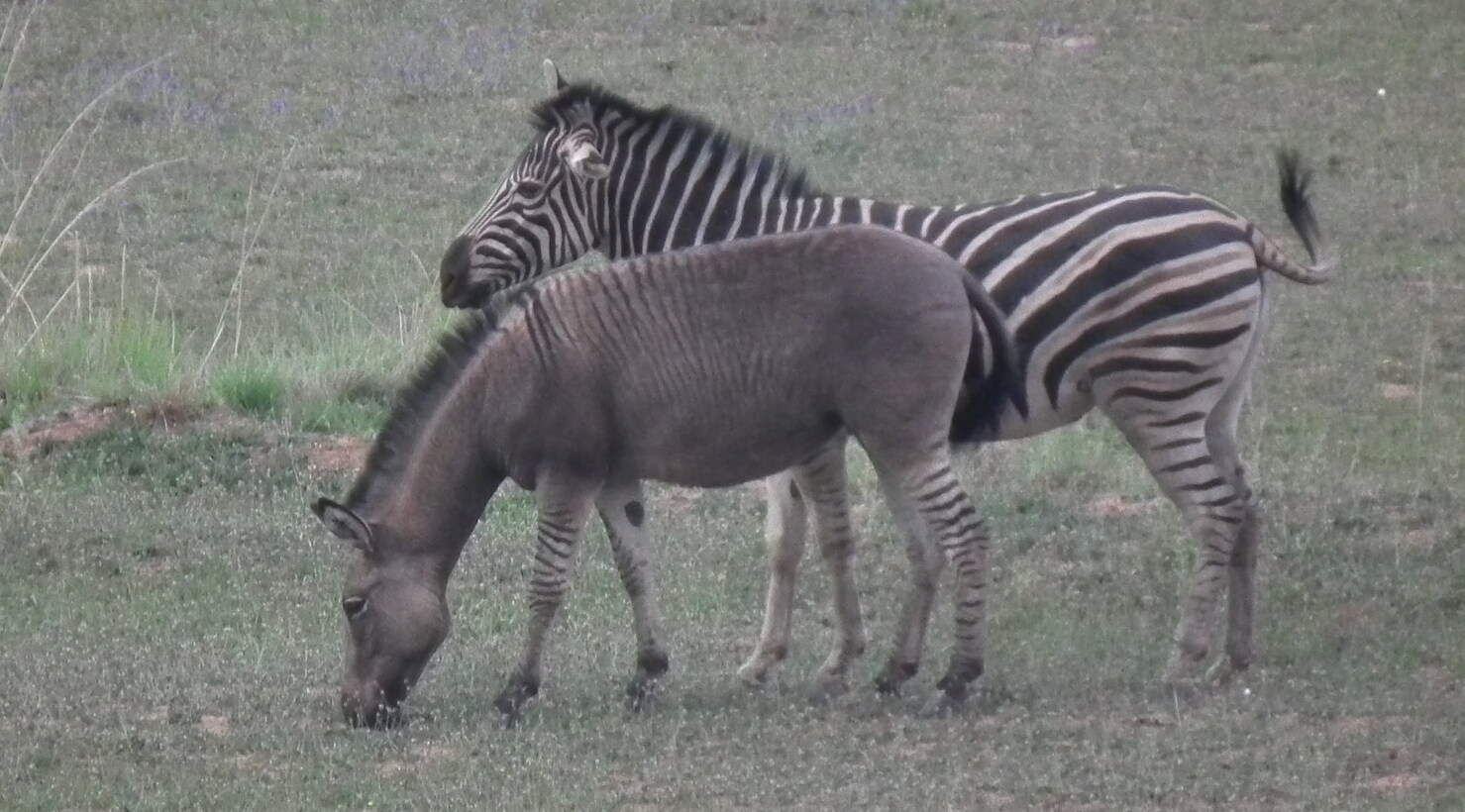
Donkey × plains zebra hybrid, in South Africa

== Characteristics ==
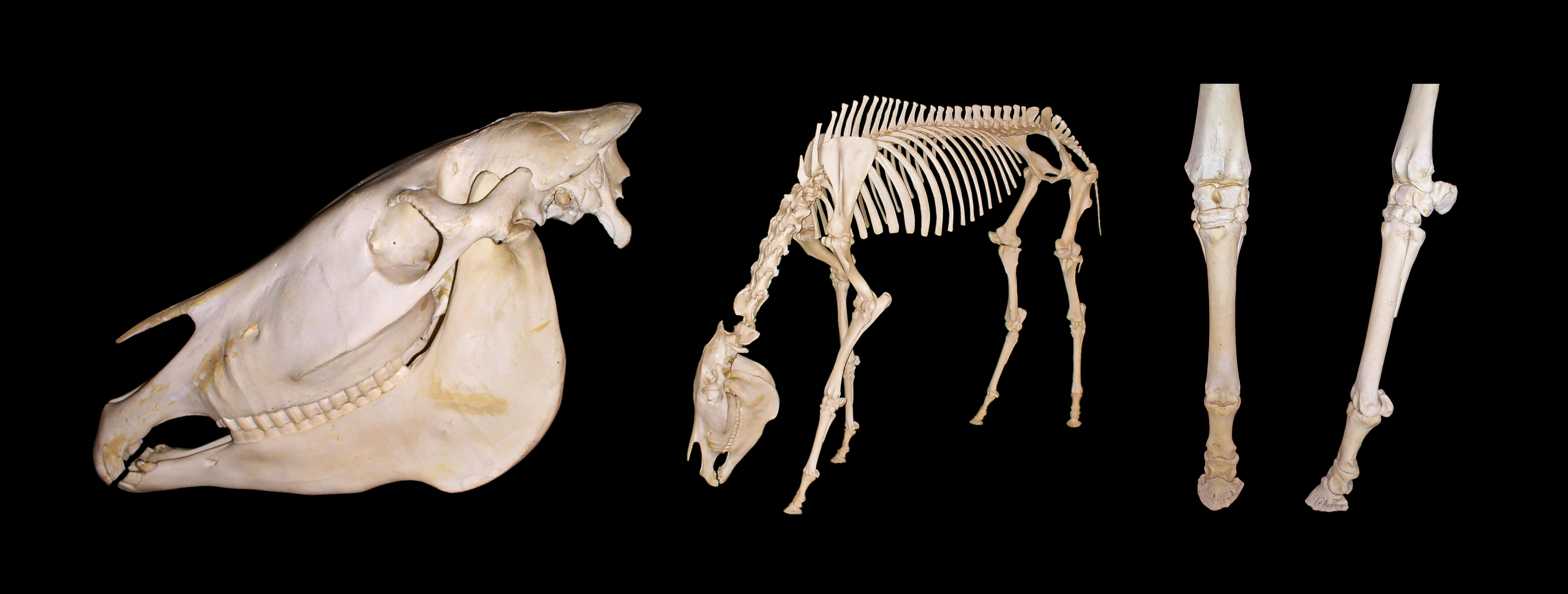
Skeleton of a Grévy's zebra at the State Museum of Natural History Karlsruhe

As with all wild equines, zebras have barrel-chested bodies with tufted tails, elongated faces and long necks with long, erect manes. Their thin legs are each supported by a spade-shaped toe covered in a hard hoof. Their dentition is adapted for grazing; they have large incisors that clip grass blades and rough molars and premolars well suited for grinding. Males have spade-shaped canines, which can be used as weapons in fighting. The eyes of zebras are at the sides and far up the head, which allows them to look over the tall grass while feeding. Their moderately long, erect ears are movable and can locate the source of a sound.

Unlike horses, zebras and asses have chestnut callosities present only on their front legs. In contrast to other living equines, zebras have longer front legs than back legs. Diagnostic traits of the zebra skull include: its relatively small size with a straight dorsal outline, protruding eye sockets, narrower rostrum, less conspicuous postorbital bar, separation of the metaconid and metastylid of the tooth by a V-shaped canal and rounded enamel wall.

=== Stripes ===
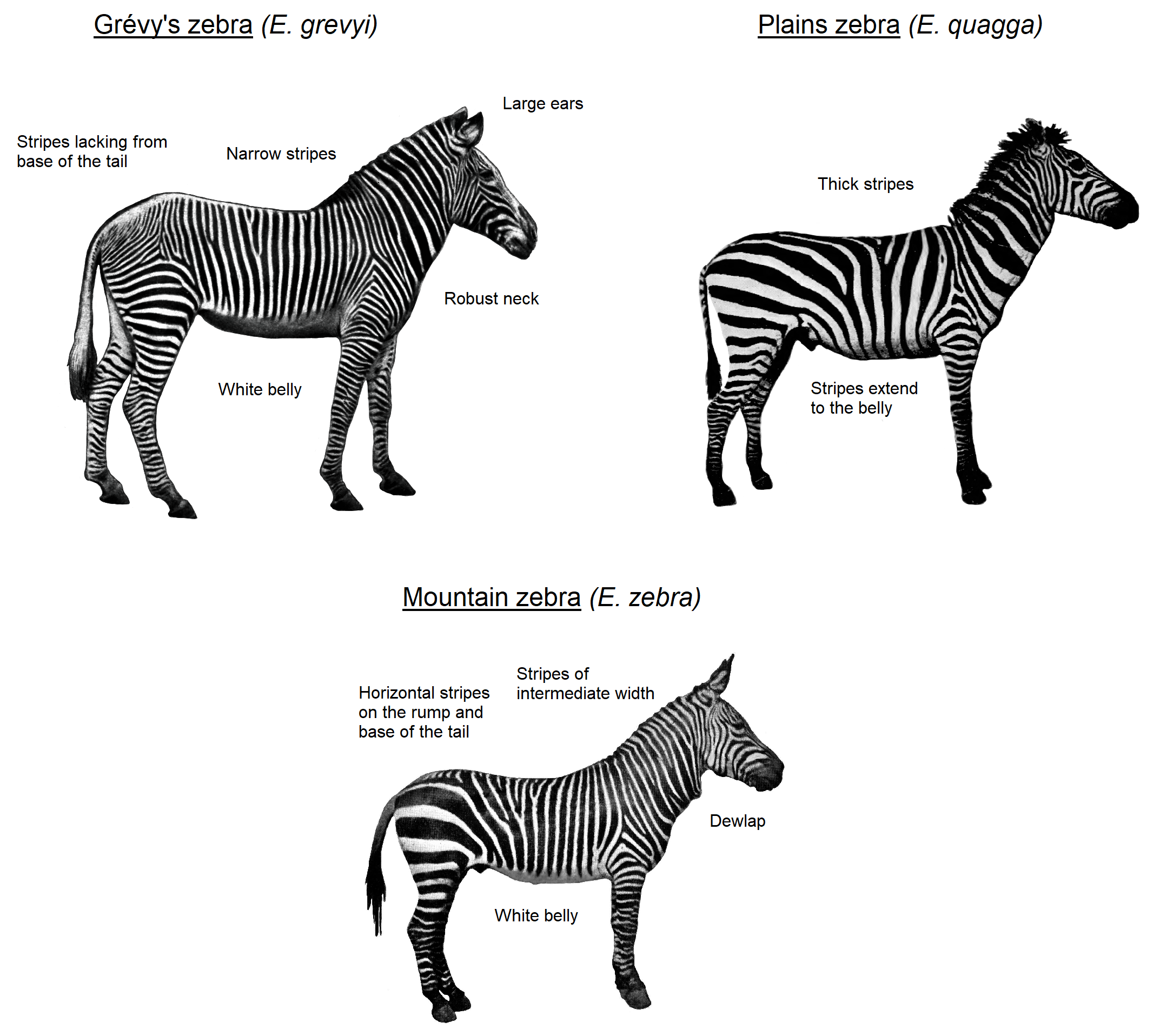
Comparative illustration of living zebra species

Zebras are easily recognised by their bold black-and-white striping patterns. The coat appears to be white with black stripes, as indicated by the belly and legs when unstriped, but the skin is black. Young or foals are born with brown and white coats, and the brown darkens with age. A dorsal stripe acts as the backbone for vertical stripes along the sides, from the head to the rump. On the snout they curve toward the nostrils, while the stripes above the front legs split into two branches. On the rump, they develop into species-specific patterns. The stripes on the legs, ears and tail are separate and horizontal.

Striping patterns are unique to an individual and heritable. During embryonic development, the stripes appear at eight months, but the patterns may be determined at three to five weeks. For each species there is a point in embryonic development where the stripes are perpendicular to the dorsal line and spaced 0.4 mm (0.016 in) apart. However, this happens at three weeks of development for the plains zebra, four weeks for the mountain zebra, and five for Grévy's zebra. The difference in timing is thought to be responsible for the differences in the striping patterns of the different species.

Various abnormalities of the patterns have been documented in plains zebras. In "melanistic" zebras, dark stripes are highly concentrated on the torso but the legs are whiter. "Spotted" individuals have broken up black stripes around the dorsal area. There have even been morphs with white spots on dark backgrounds. Striping abnormalities have been linked to inbreeding. Albino zebras have been recorded in the forests of Mount Kenya, with the dark stripes being blonde. The quagga had brown and white stripes on the head and neck, brown upper parts and a white belly, tail and legs.

==== Function ====
The function of stripes in zebras has been discussed among biologists since at least the 19th century. Popular hypotheses include the following:

- The crypsis hypothesis suggests that the stripes allow the animal to blend in with its environment or break up its outline. This was the earliest hypothesis and proponents argued that the stripes were particularly suited for camouflage in tall grassland and woodland habitat. Alfred Wallace also wrote in 1896 that stripes make zebras less noticeable at night. Biologist Tim Caro notes that zebras graze in open habitat and do not behave cryptically, being noisy, fast, and social and do not freeze when a predator is near. In addition, the camouflaging stripes of woodland living ungulates like bongos and bushbucks are much less vivid with less contrast with the background colour. A 1987 Fourier analysis study concluded that the patterns of zebra stripes do not line up with their environment, while a 2014 study of wild equine species and subspecies could not find any correlations between striping patterns and woodland habitats. Melin and colleagues (2016) found that lions and hyenas do not appear to perceive the stripes when they are a certain distance away at daytime or nighttime, thus making the stripes useless in blending in except when the predators are close enough by which they could smell or hear their target. They also found that the stripes do not make the zebra less noticeable than solidly coloured herbivores on the open plains. They suggested that stripes may give zebras an advantage in woodlands, as the dark stripes could line up with the outlines of tree branches and other vegetation.

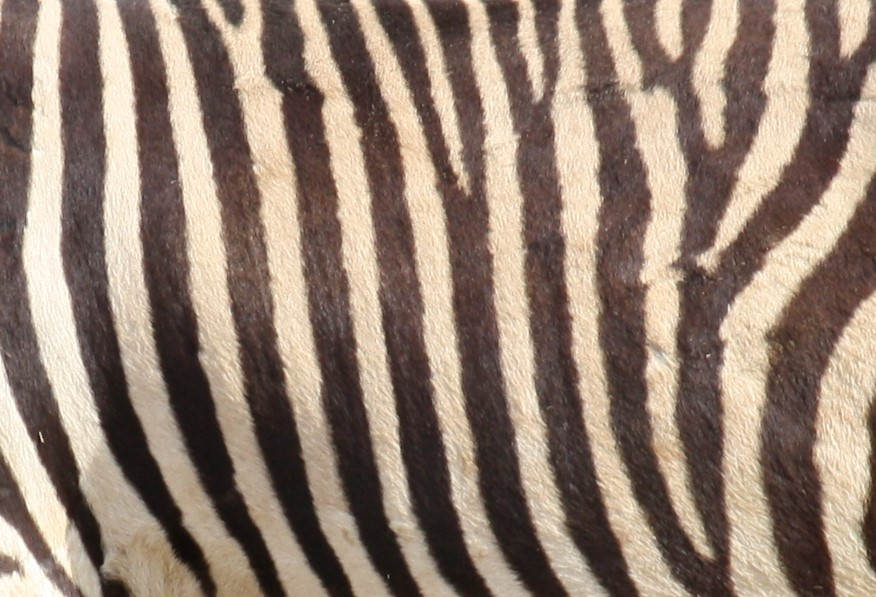
Closeup of mountain zebra stripes

- The confusion hypothesis states that the stripes confuse predators, be it by: making it harder to distinguish individuals in a group as well as determining the number of zebras in a group; making it difficult to determine an individual's outline when the group runs away; reducing a predator's ability to keep track of a target during a chase; dazzling an assailant so they have difficulty making contact; or making it difficult for a predator to deduce the zebra's size, speed and direction via motion dazzle. This theory has been proposed by several biologists since at least the 1970s. A 2014 computer study of zebra stripes found that they may create a wagon-wheel effect and/or barber pole illusion when in motion. The researchers concluded that this could be used against mammalian predators or biting flies. The use of the stripes for confusing mammalian predators has been questioned. Caro suggests that the stripes of zebras could make groups seem smaller, and thus more likely to be attacked. Zebras also tend to scatter when fleeing from attackers and thus the stripes could not break up an individual's outline. Lions, in particular, appear to have no difficulty targeting and catching zebras when they get close and take them by ambush. In addition, no correlations have been found between the number of stripes and populations of mammal predators. Hughes and colleagues (2021) disputed the idea of motion dazzle and concluded that moving objects that are solidly grey or have less contrasted patterns are actually more likely to escape being caught.
- The aposematic hypothesis suggests that the stripes serve as warning colouration. This hypothesis was first suggested by Wallace in 1867 and discussed in more detail by Edward Bagnall Poulton in 1890. As with known aposematic mammals, zebras are recognizable up close, live in more open environments, have a high risk of predation and do not hide or act inconspicuous. However, Caro notes that stripes do not work on lions because they frequently prey on zebras, though they may work on smaller predators, and zebras are not slow-moving enough to need to ward off threats. In addition, zebras do not possess adequate defenses to back up the warning pattern.
- The social function hypothesis states that stripes serve a role in intraspecific or individual recognition, social bonding, mutual grooming or a signal of fitness. Charles Darwin wrote in 1871 (Note: The cited source cites the 1896 edition of Darwin's 1871 book The Descent of Man, and Selection in Relation to Sex.) that "a female zebra would not admit the addresses of a male ass until he was painted so as to resemble a zebra" while Wallace stated in 1871 that: "The stripes therefore may be of use by enabling stragglers to distinguish their fellows at a distance". Regarding species and individual identification, Caro notes that zebra species have limited range overlap with each other and horses can recognise each other using visual communication. In addition, no correlation has been found between striping and social behaviour or group numbers among equines, and no link has been found between fitness and striping.
- The thermoregulatory hypothesis suggests that stripes help to control a zebra's body temperature. In 1971, biologist H. A. Baldwin noted that heat would be absorbed by the black stripes and reflected by the white ones and in 1990, zoologist Desmond Morris suggested that the stripes create cooling convection currents. A 2019 study supported this, finding that where the faster air currents of the warmer black stripes meet those of the white, air swirls form. The researchers also concluded that during the hottest times of the day, zebras erect their black hair to release heat from the skin and flatten it again when it gets cooler. Larison and colleagues (2015) determined that environmental temperature is a strong predictor for zebra striping patterns. Others have found no evidence that zebras have lower body temperatures than other ungulates whose habitat they share, or that striping correlates with temperature. A 2018 experimental study which dressed water-filled metal barrels in horse, zebra and cattle hides concluded that zebra stripes had no effect on thermoregulation.

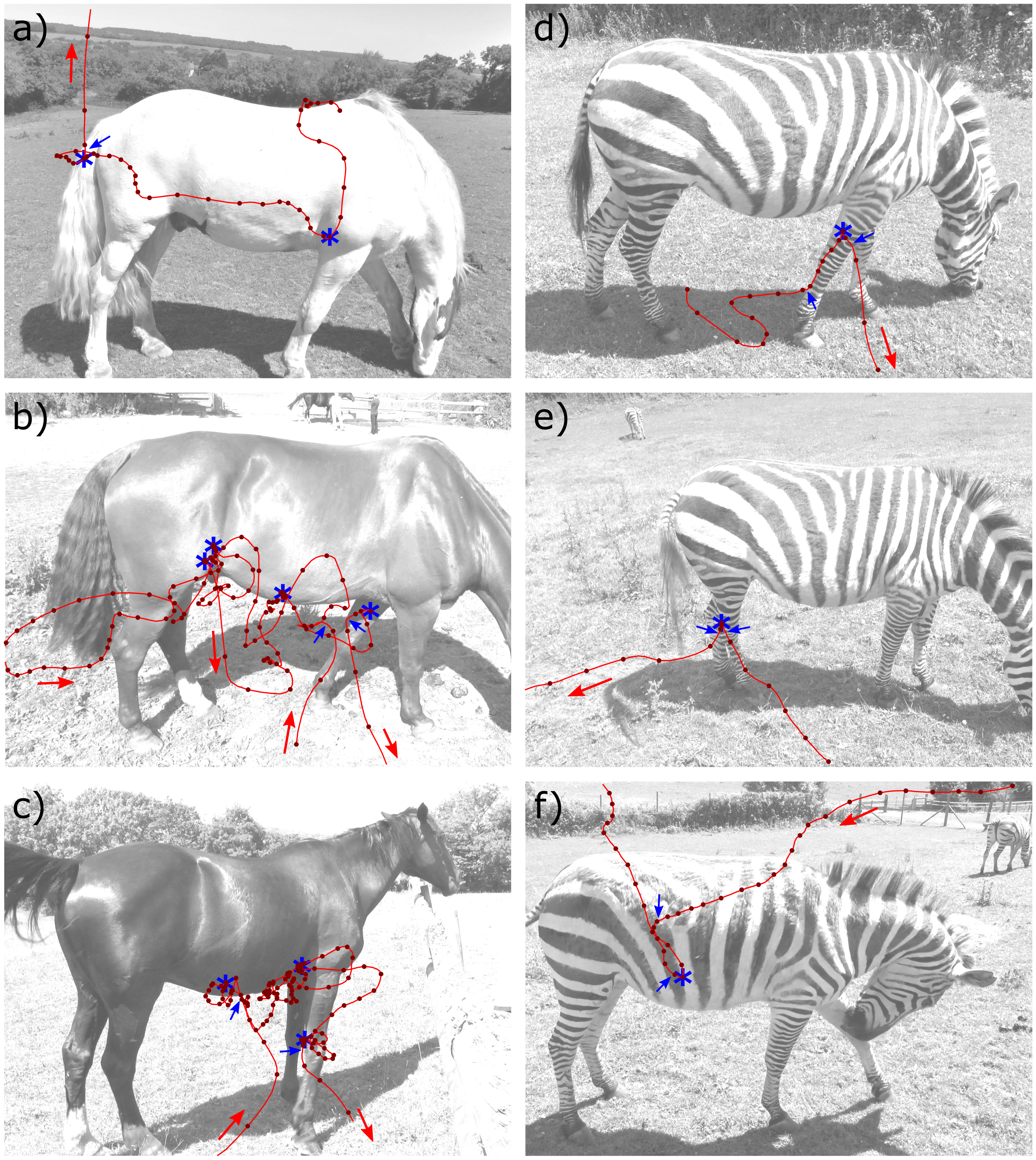
Comparison of flight patterns and contact/landings of horse flies around domestic horses (a-c) and plains zebras (d-f).

- The fly protection hypothesis holds that the stripes deter blood-sucking flies. Horse flies, in particular, spread diseases that are lethal to equines such as African horse sickness, equine influenza, equine infectious anemia and trypanosomiasis. In addition, zebra hair is about as long as the mouthparts of these flies. It was found that flies preferred landing on solidly coloured surfaces over those with black-and-white striped patterns in 1930 by biologist R. Harris, and this was proposed to have been a function of zebra stripes in a 1981 study. A 2014 study found a correlation between striping and overlap with horse and tsetse fly populations and activity. Other studies have found that zebras are rarely targeted by these insect species. Caro and colleagues (2019) studied captive zebras and horses and observed that neither could deter flies from a distance, but zebra stripes kept flies from landing, both on zebras and horses dressed in zebra print coats. There does not appear to be any difference in the effectiveness of repelling flies between the different zebra species; thus the difference in striping patterns may have evolved for other reasons. White or light stripes painted on dark bodies have also been found to reduce fly irritations in both cattle and humans. How the stripes repel flies is less clear. A 2012 study concluded that they disrupt the polarised light patterns these insects use to locate water and habitat, though subsequent studies have refuted this. Stripes do not appear to work like a barber pole against flies since checkered patterns also repel them. There is also little evidence that zebra stripes confuse the insects via visual distortion or aliasing. Takács and colleagues (2022) suggest that, when the animal is in sunlight, temperature gradients between the warmer dark stripes and cooler white stripes prevent horseflies from detecting the warm blood vessels underneath. Caro and colleagues (2023) conclude that the high colour contrast and relative thinness of the patterns make it difficult for the insects to find a place to land. While a 2025 review study concluded this hypothesis has the most empirical evidence, it cautions that it does not by itself explain why striping did not evolve in other African herbivores and that " fly-carried diseases do not appear likely to be an extra burden for zebra compared to sympatric herbivores and the short hair argument does not seem satisfactory."

== Behaviour and ecology ==
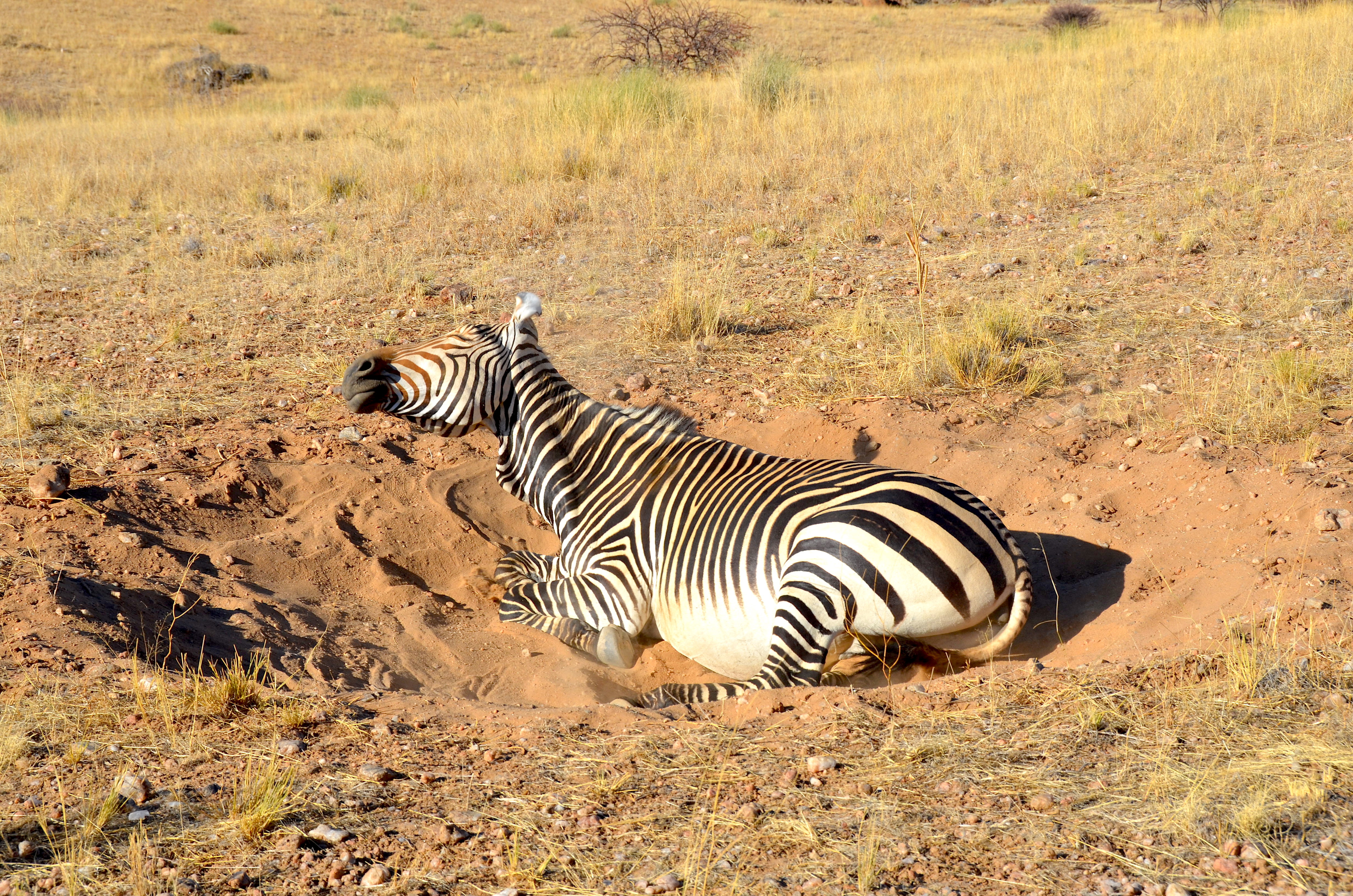
Mountain zebra dustbathing in Namibia

Zebras may travel or migrate to wetter areas during the dry season. Plains zebras have been recorded travelling 500 km (310 mi) between Namibia and Botswana, the longest land migration of mammals in Africa. When migrating, they appear to rely on some memory of the locations where foraging conditions were best and may predict conditions months after their arrival. Plains zebras are more water-dependent and live in moister environments than other species. They usually can be found 10–12 km (6.2–7.5 mi) from a water source. Grévy's zebras can survive almost a week without water but will drink it every day when given the chance, and their bodies maintain water better than cattle. Mountain zebras can be found at elevations of up to 2,000 m (6,600 ft). Zebras sleep up to seven hours a day, standing up during the day and lying down during the night. They regularly use various objects as rubbing posts and will roll on the ground.

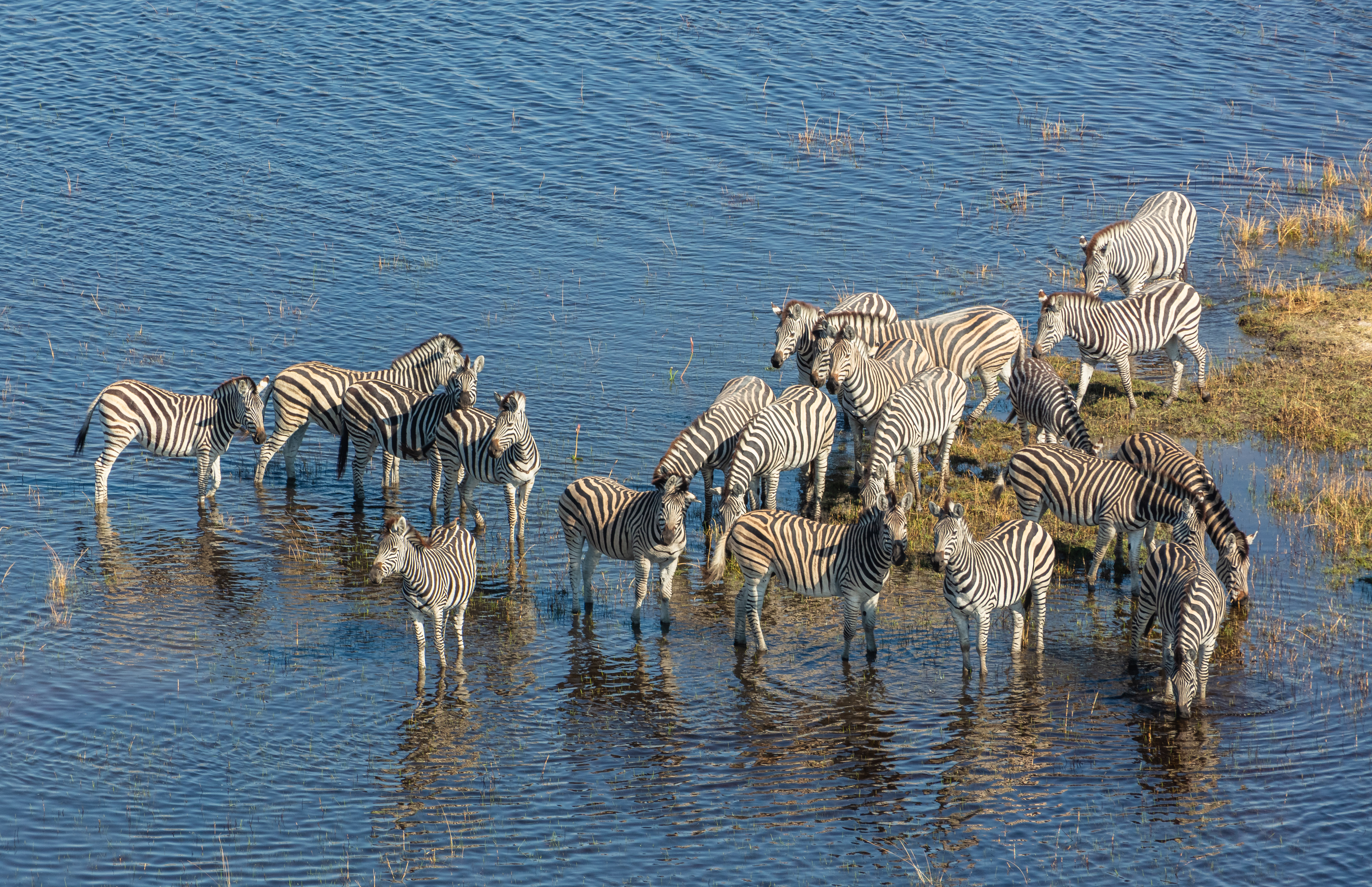
Plains zebras at Okavango Delta, Botswana

A zebra's diet is mostly grasses and sedges, but they will opportunistically consume bark, leaves, buds, fruits, and roots. Compared to ruminants, zebras have a simpler and less efficient digestive system. Nevertheless, they can subsist on lower-quality vegetation. Zebras may spend 60–80% of their time feeding, depending on the availability of vegetation. The plains zebra is a pioneer grazer, mowing down the upper, less nutritious grass canopy and preparing the way for more specialised grazers like wildebeest, which depend on shorter and more nutritious grasses below.

Zebras are preyed on mainly by lions. Leopards, cheetahs, spotted hyenas, brown hyenas and wild dogs pose less of a threat to adults. Biting and kicking are a zebra's defense tactics. When threatened by lions, zebras flee, and when caught they are rarely effective in fighting off the big cats. In one study, the maximum speed of a zebra was found to be 50 km/h (31 mph) while a lion was measured at 74 km/h (46 mph). Zebras do not escape lions by speed alone but by sideways turning, especially when the cat is close behind. With smaller predators like hyenas and dogs, zebras may act more aggressively, especially in defense of their young.

=== Social behaviour ===
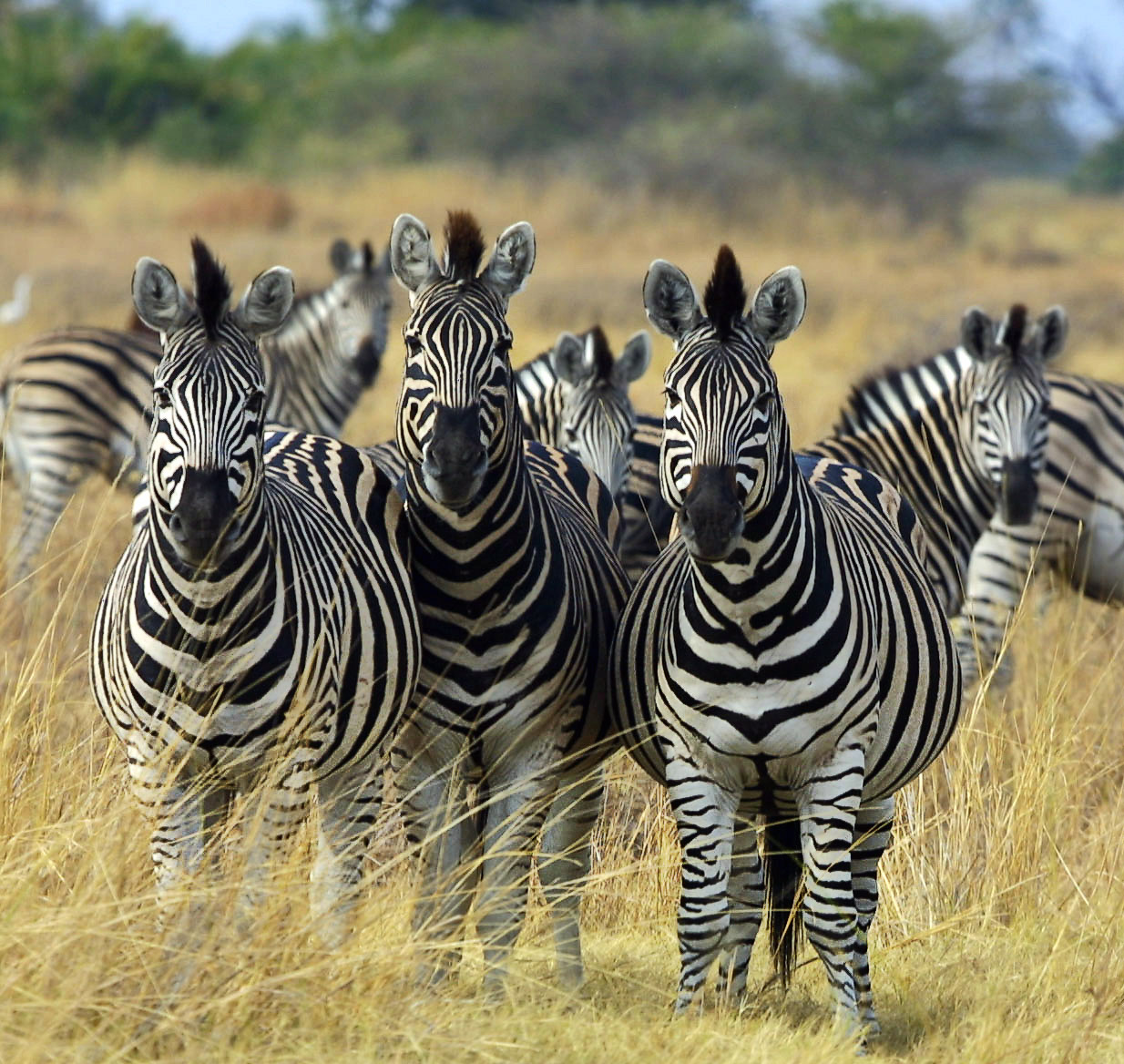
A plains zebra group

Zebra species have two basic social structures. Plains and mountain zebras live in stable, closed family groups or harems consisting of one stallion, several mares, and their offspring. These groups have their own home ranges, which overlap, and they tend to be nomadic. Stallions form and expand their harems by herding young mares away from their birth harems. The stability of the group remains even when the family stallion is displaced. Plains zebras groups gather into large herds and may create temporarily stable subgroups within a herd, allowing individuals to interact with those outside their group. Females in harems can spend more time feeding, and gain protection both for them and their young. They have a linear dominance hierarchy with the high-ranking females having lived in the group longest. While traveling, the most dominant females and their offspring lead the group, followed by the next most dominant; the family stallion trails behind. Young of both sexes leave their natal groups as they mature; females are usually herded by outside males to become part of their harems.

In the more arid-living Grévy's zebras, adults have more fluid associations and adult males establish large territories, marked by dung piles, and mate with the females that enter them. Grazing and drinking areas tend to be separated in these environments and the most dominant males establish territories near watering holes, which attract females with dependent foals and those who simply want a drink, while less dominant males control territories away from water with more vegetation, and only attract mares without foals. Mares may travel through several territories but remain in one when they have young. Staying in a territory offers a female protection from harassment by outside males, as well as access to resources.

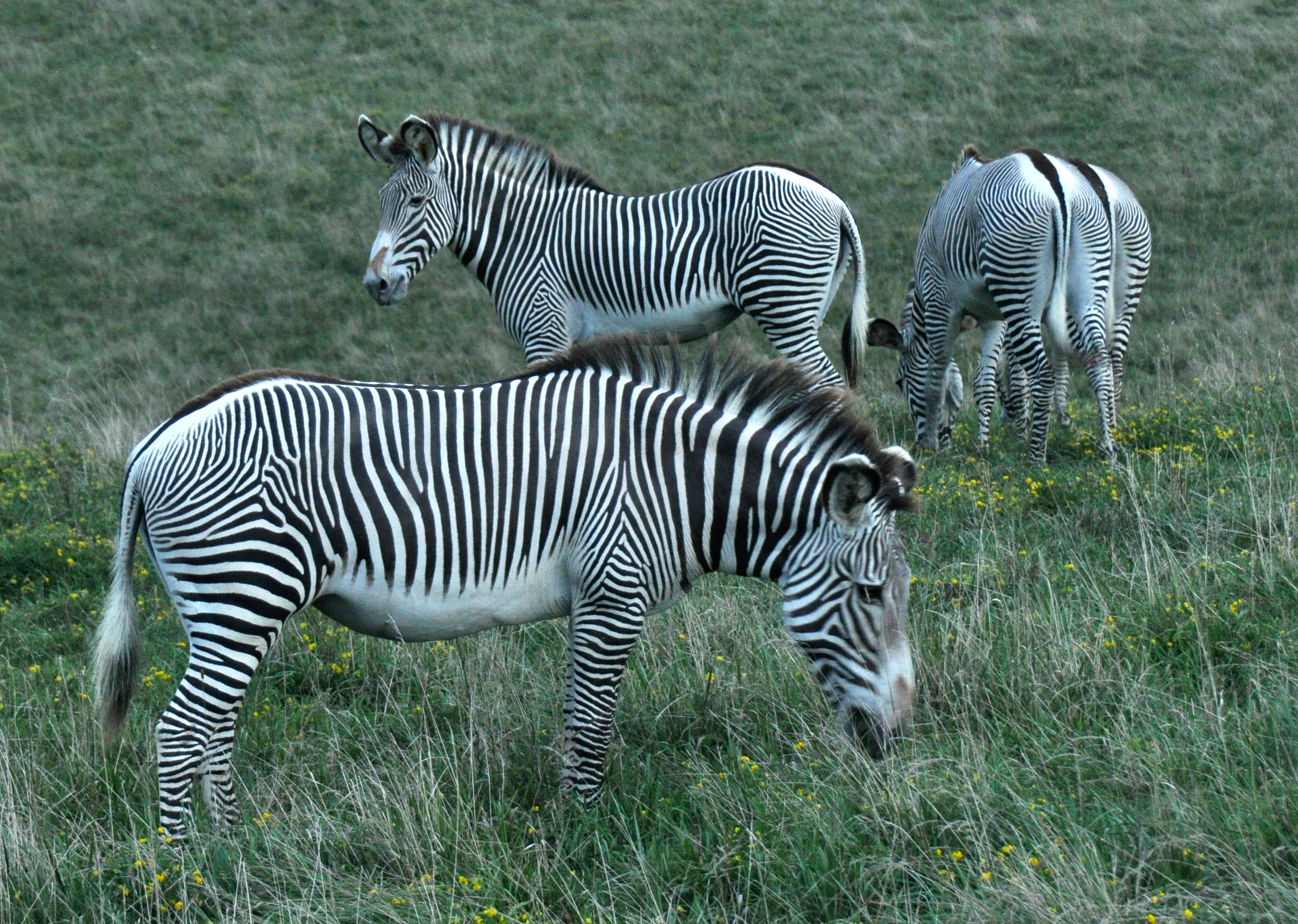
Group of Grévy's zebras grazing

In all species, excess males gather in bachelor groups. These are typically young males that are not yet ready to establish a harem or territory. With the plains zebra, the oldest males are the most dominant and group membership is stable. Bachelor groups tend to be at the boundaries of herds and during group movements, the bachelors follow behind or along the sides. Mountain zebra bachelor groups may also include young females that have left their natal group early, as well as old, former harem males. A territorial Grévy's zebra stallion may allow non-territorial bachelors in their territory, however when a mare in oestrous is present the territorial stallion keeps other stallions at bay. Bachelors prepare for their future harem roles with play fights and greeting/challenge rituals, which make up most of their activities.

Fights between males usually occur over mates and involve biting and kicking. In plains zebra, stallions fight each other over recently matured mares to bring into their group and her father will fight off all suitors trying to abduct her. As long as a harem stallion is healthy, he is not usually challenged. Only unhealthy stallions have their harems taken over, and even then, the new stallion slowly takes over, peacefully displacing the old one. Agonistic behaviour between male Grévy's zebras occurs at the border of their territories.

=== Communication ===
Grévy's zebra call
The call of a Grevy's zebra at Lincoln Park Zoo, Chicago, Illinois.

Zebras produce a number of vocalisations and noises. The plains zebra has a distinctive, barking contact call heard as "a-ha, a-ha, a-ha" or "kwa-ha, kaw-ha, ha, ha". The mountain zebra may produce a similar sound while the call of Grévy's zebra has been described as "something like a hippo's grunt combined with a donkey's wheeze". Loud snorting and rough "gasping" in zebras signals alarm. Squealing is usually made when in pain, but can also be heard in friendly interactions. Zebras also communicate with visual displays, and the flexibility of their lips allows them to make complex facial expressions. Visual displays also consist of head, ear, and tail postures. A zebra may signal an intention to kick by dropping back its ears and whipping its tail. Flattened ears, bared teeth and a waving head may be used as threatening gestures by stallions.

Individuals may greet each other by mutually touching and rubbing, sniffing their genitals and resting their heads on their shoulders. They then may caress their shoulders against each other and lay their heads on one another. This greeting usually occurs between harem or territorial males or among bachelor males playing. Plains and mountain zebras strengthen their social bonds with grooming. Members of a harem nibble and rake along the neck, shoulder, and back with their teeth and lips. Grooming usually occurs between mothers and foals and between stallions and mares. Grooming establishes social rank and eases aggressive behaviour, although Grévy's zebras generally do not perform social grooming.

=== Reproduction and parenting ===
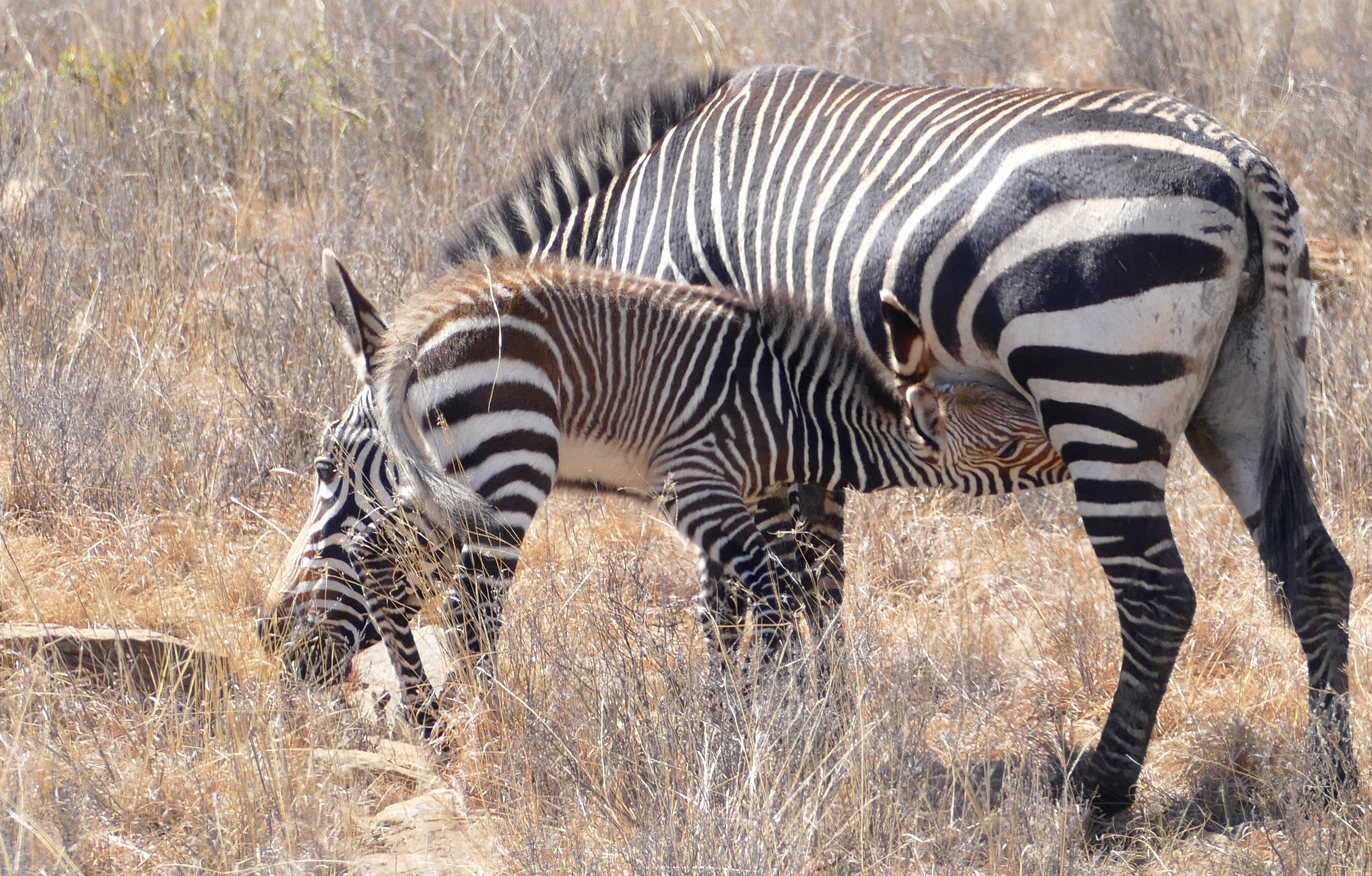
Mountain zebra suckling a foal

Among plains and mountain zebras, the adult females mate only with their harem stallion, while in Grévy's zebras, mating is more promiscuous and the males have larger testes for sperm competition. Female zebras have five to ten day long oestrous cycles; physical signs include a swollen, everted (inside out) labia and copious flows of urine and mucus. Upon reaching peak oestrous, mares spread-out their legs, lift their tails and open their mouths when in the presence of a male. Males assess the female's reproductive state with a curled lip and bared teeth (flehmen response) and the female will solicit mating by backing in. Gestation is typically around a year. A few days to a month later, mares can return to oestrus. In harem-holding species, oestrus in a female becomes less noticeable to outside males as she gets older, hence competition for older females is virtually nonexistent.

Usually, a single foal is born, which is capable of running within an hour of birth. A newborn zebra will follow anything that moves, so new mothers prevent other mares from approaching their foals as they become more familiar with the mother's striping pattern, smell and voice. At a few weeks old, foals begin to graze, but may continue to nurse for eight to thirteen months. Living in an arid environment, Grévy's zebras have longer nursing intervals and young only begin to drink water three months after birth.

In plains and mountain zebras, foals are cared for mostly by their mothers, but if threatened by pack-hunting hyenas and dogs, the entire group works together to protect all the young. The group forms a protective front with the foals in the centre, and the stallion will rush at predators that come too close. In Grévy's zebras, young stay in "kindergartens" when their mothers leave for water. These groups are tended to by the territorial male. A stallion may look after a foal in his territory to ensure that the mother stays, though it may not be his. By contrast, plains zebra stallions are generally intolerant of foals that are not theirs and may practice infanticide and feticide via violence to the pregnant mare.

== Human relations ==
=== Cultural significance ===
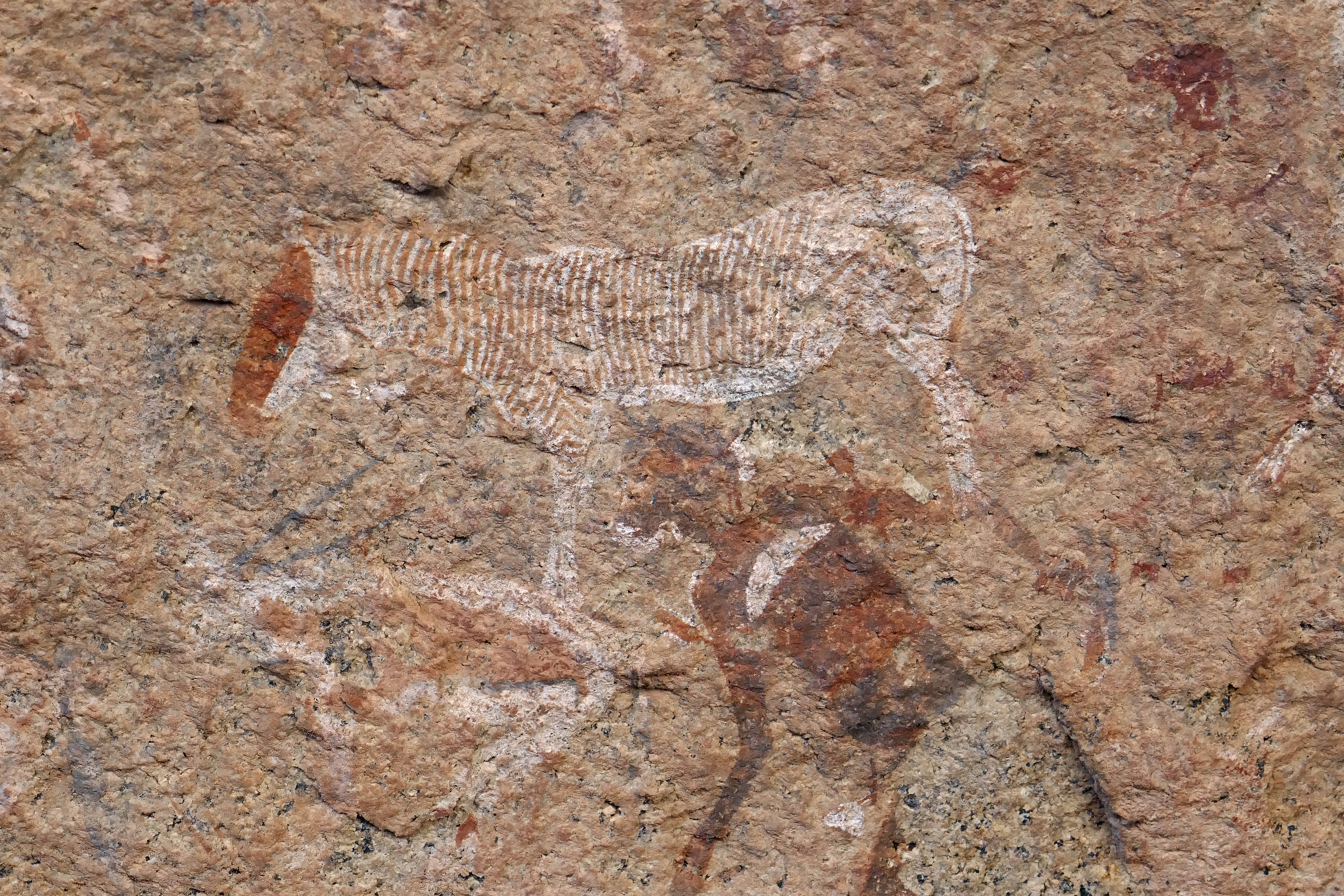
San rock art depicting a zebra

With their distinctive black-and-white stripes, zebras are among the most recognizable mammals. They have been associated with beauty and grace, with naturalist Thomas Pennant describing them in 1781 as "the most elegant of quadrupeds". Zebras have been popular in photography, with some wildlife photographers describing them as the most photogenic animal. They have become staples in children's stories and wildlife-themed art, such as depictions of Noah's Ark. In children's alphabet books, the animals are often used to represent the letter 'Z'. Zebra stripe patterns are popularly used for body paintings, dress, furniture and architecture.

Zebras have been featured in African art and culture for millennia. They are depicted in rock art in Southern Africa dating from 28,000 to 20,000 years ago, though less often than antelope species like eland. How the zebra got its stripes has been the subject of folk tales, some of which involve it being scorched by fire. The Maasai proverb "a man without culture is like a zebra without stripes" has become popular in Africa. The San people connected zebra stripes with water, rain and lightning, and water spirits were conceived of having these markings.

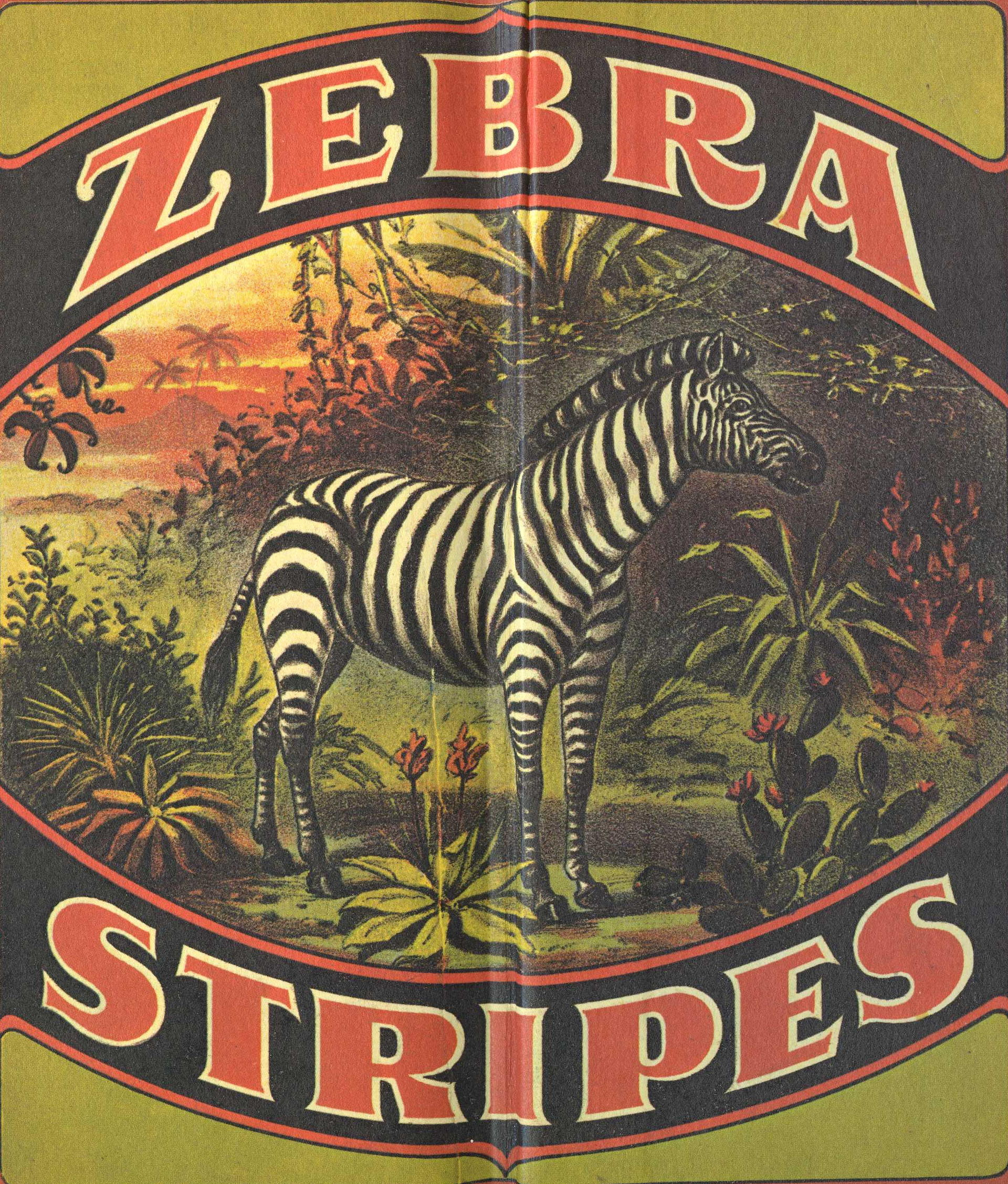
"Zebra Stripes," trademark for the defunct Glen Raven Cotton Mills Company

For the Shona people, the zebra is a totem animal and is glorified in a poem as an "iridescent and glittering creature". Its stripes have symbolised the union of male and female and at the ruined city of Great Zimbabwe, zebra stripes decorate what is believed to be a domba, a school meant to prepare girls for adulthood. In the Shona language, the name madhuve means "woman/women of the zebra totem" and is a name for girls in Zimbabwe. The plains zebra is the national animal of Botswana and zebras have been depicted on stamps during colonial and post-colonial Africa. For people of the African diaspora, the zebra represented the politics of race and identity, being both black and white.

In cultures outside of its range, the zebra has been thought of as a more exotic alternative to the horse; the comic book character Sheena, Queen of the Jungle, is depicted riding a zebra and explorer Osa Johnson was photographed riding one. The film Racing Stripes features a captive zebra ostracised from the horses and ends up being ridden by a rebellious girl. Zebras have been featured as characters in animated films like Khumba, The Lion King and the Madagascar films and television series such as Zou.

Zebras have been popular subjects for abstract, modernist and surrealist artists. Such art includes Christopher Wood's Zebra and Parachute, Lucian Freud's The Painter's Room and Quince on a Blue Table and the various paintings of Mary Fedden and Sidney Nolan. Victor Vasarely depicted zebras as black and white lines and connected in a jigsaw puzzle fashion. Carel Weight's Escape of the Zebra from the Zoo during an Air Raid was based on a real life incident of a zebra escaping during the bombing of London Zoo and consists of four comic book-like panels. Zebras have lent themselves to products and advertisements, including for 'Zebra Grate Polish' cleaning supplies by British manufacturer Reckitt and Sons and Japanese pen manufacturer Zebra Co., Ltd.

=== Captivity ===
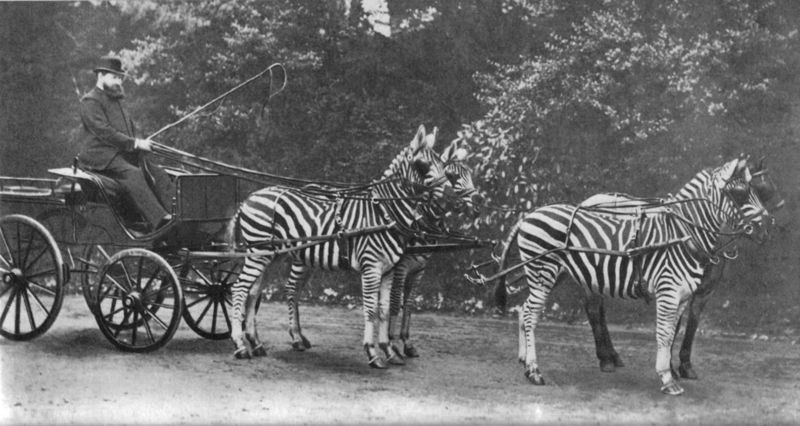
Walter Rothschild with a zebra carriage

Zebras have been kept in captivity since at least the Roman Empire. In later times, captive zebras have been shipped around the world, often for diplomatic reasons. In 1261, Sultan Baibars of Egypt established an embassy with Alfonso X of Castile and sent a zebra and other exotic animals as gifts. In 1417, a zebra was gifted to the Chinese people by Somalia and displayed before the Yongle Emperor. The fourth Mughal emperor Jahangir received a zebra from Ethiopia in 1620 and Ustad Mansur made a painting of it. In the 1670s, Ethiopian Emperor Yohannes I exported two zebras to the Dutch governor of Jakarta. These animals would eventually be given by the Dutch to the Tokugawa Shogunate of Japan.

When Queen Charlotte received a zebra as a wedding gift in 1762, the animal became a source of fascination for the people of Britain. Many flocked to see it at its paddock at Buckingham Palace. It soon became the subject of humour and satire, being referred to as "The Queen's Ass", and was the subject of an oil painting by George Stubbs in 1763. The zebra also gained a reputation for being ill-tempered and kicked at visitors. In 1882, Ethiopia sent a zebra to French president Jules Grévy, and the species it belonged to was named in his honour.

Attempts to domesticate zebras were largely unsuccessful. It is possible that having evolved under pressure from the many large predators of Africa, including early humans, they became more aggressive, thus making domestication more difficult. However, zebras have been trained throughout history. In Rome, zebras are recorded to have pulled chariots during amphitheatre games starting in the reign of Caracalla (198 to 217 AD). In the late 19th century, the zoologist Walter Rothschild trained some zebras to draw a carriage in England, which he drove to Buckingham Palace to demonstrate that it can be done. In the early 20th century, German colonial officers in East Africa tried to use zebras for both driving and riding, with limited success.

== Conservation ==
As of 2016–2019, the IUCN Red List of mammals lists Grévy's zebra as endangered, the mountain zebra as vulnerable and the plains zebra as near-threatened. Grévy's zebra populations are estimated at less than 2,000 mature individuals, but they are stable. Mountain zebras number near 35,000 individuals and their population appears to be increasing. Plains zebra are estimated to number 150,000–250,000 with a decreasing population trend. Human intervention has fragmented zebra ranges and populations. Zebras are threatened by hunting for their hide and meat, and habitat destruction. They also compete with livestock and have their travelling routes obstruct by fences. Civil wars in some countries have also caused declines in zebra populations. By the early 20th century, zebra skins were being used to make rugs and chairs. In the 21st century, zebras may be taken by trophy hunters as zebra skin rugs sell for $1,000 to $2,000. Trophy hunting was rare among African peoples though the San were known to hunt zebra for meat.

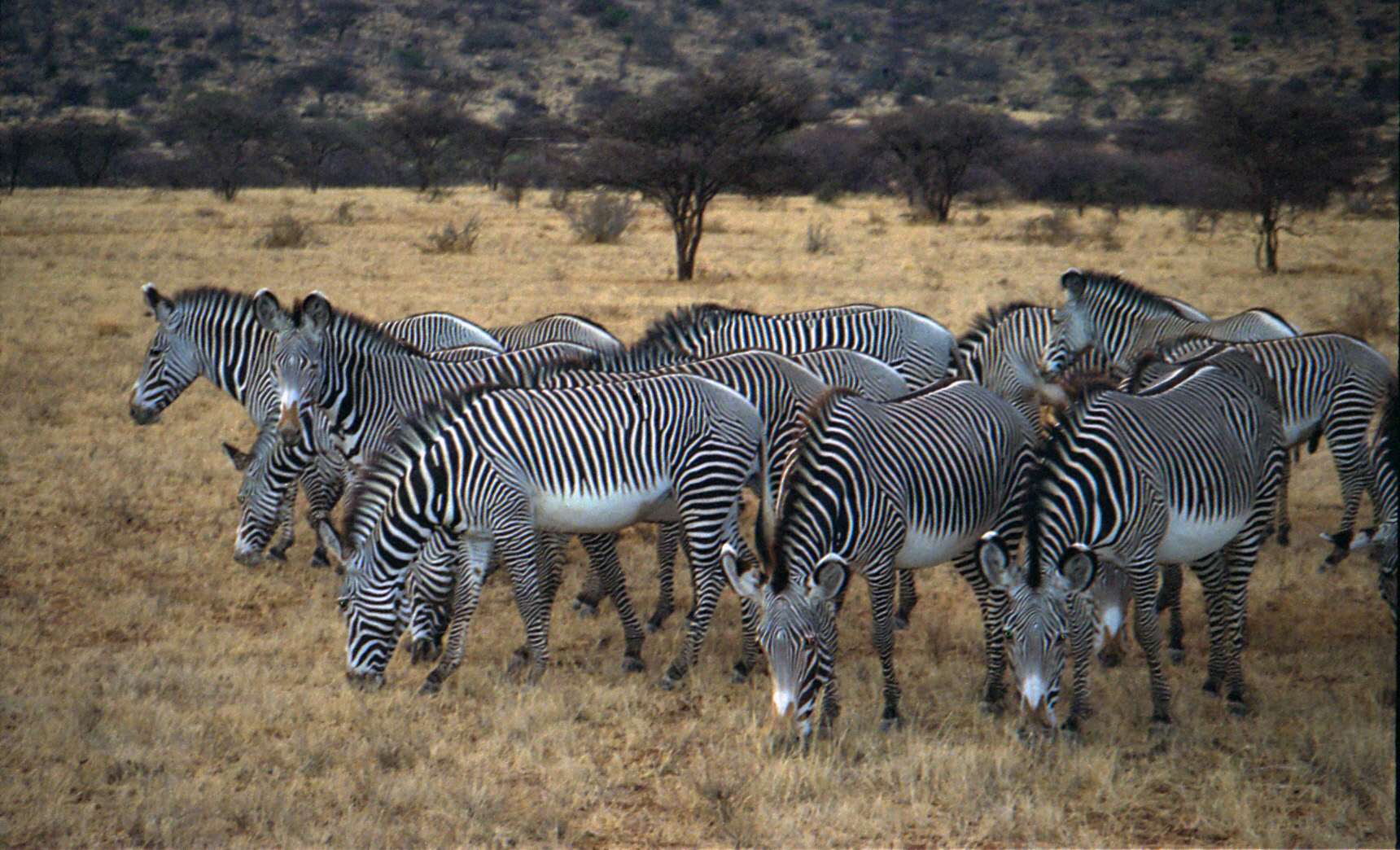
Endangered Grévy's zebras in Samburu National Reserve

The quagga (E. quagga quagga) population was hunted by early Dutch settlers and later by Afrikaners to provide meat or for their skins. The skins were traded or used locally. The quagga was probably vulnerable to extinction due to its restricted range, and because they were easy to find in large groups. The last known wild quagga died in 1878. The last captive quagga, a female in Amsterdam's Natura Artis Magistra zoo, lived there from 9 May 1867 until it died on 12 August 1883. The Cape mountain zebra, a subspecies of mountain zebra, nearly went extinct due to hunting and habitat destruction, with less than 50 individuals left by the 1950s. Protections from South African National Parks allowed the population to rise to 2,600 by the 2010s.

Zebras can be found in numerous protected areas. Important areas for Grévy's zebra include Yabelo Wildlife Sanctuary and Chelbi Sanctuary in Ethiopia and Buffalo Springs, Samburu and Shaba National Reserves in Kenya. The plains zebra inhabits the Serengeti National Park in Tanzania, Tsavo and Masai Mara in Kenya, Hwange National Park in Zimbabwe, Etosha National Park in Namibia, and Kruger National Park in South Africa. Mountain zebras are protected in Mountain Zebra National Park, Karoo National Park and Goegap Nature Reserve in South Africa as well as Etosha and Namib-Naukluft Park in Namibia.

== See also ==
- Fauna of Africa
- Lord Morton's mare
- Primitive markings – markings found on other equines
- Zonkey (Tijuana) – a donkey painted with zebra stripes
