= Arena Zonkeys =

Arena in Baja California, Mexico

- Interactive map of Arena Zonkeys
- Location: Tijuana, Mexico
- Coordinates: 32°29′03″N 116°59′11″W
- Owner: City of Tijuana
- Capacity: 3,000

Construction
- Opened: 2019

Tenant
- Zonkeys de Tijuana (CIBACOPA) (2019–present)

The Arena Zonkeys is an arena in Tijuana, Baja California, Mexico. The arena was opened on 2019. The arena is the home venue of the Zonkeys de Tijuana of the CIBACOPA.
