= Zonkeys de Tijuana =

- League: CIBACOPA
- Founded: 2010
- History: Zonkeys de Tijuana (2010–present)
- Arena: Arena Zonkeys
- Capacity: 3,000
- Location: Tijuana, Baja California, Mexico
- Team colors: Gainsboro, Black and blue
- President: Rafael Carrillo Barrón
- Head coach: Luis Flores
- Championships: 3 (2014, 2015, 2018)
- Website: www.tijuanazonkeys.com.mx
Home	Away

The Zonkeys de Tijuana are a Mexican professional basketball team based in Tijuana, Baja California. The Zonkeys compete in the Circuito de Baloncesto de la Costa del Pacífico (CIBACOPA). The team plays its home games at Arena Zonkeys. The Zonkeys were founded in 2010, and won back-to-back championships in 2014 and 2015.

The name comes from the tradition of painting stripes on donkeys to resemble zebras, a practice once common on the city's famed tourist strip, Avenida Revolución. Tourists would pay to take pictures with or on the zonkeys.

== History ==
The team was founded in 2010 and entered the league the same year. It became the first professional basketball team to play in Tijuana since the LNBP's Cosmos de Tijuana and the Tijuana Dragons of the ABA. They won their first championship in 2014 with a 4-3 finals series win over Caballeros de Culiacán.

They defeated the Halcones de Ciudad Obregón in the 2018 finals in a six-game series.

In December 2019, ex-NBA player Henry Bibby was hired as head coach ahead of the 2020 season. They also opened a new arena, the Arena Zonkeys, moving their home games from Auditorio Fausto Gutierrez Moreno.

== Players ==
=== Current roster ===
Note: Flags indicate national team eligibility at FIBA-sanctioned events. Players may hold other non-FIBA nationalities not displayed.

Tijuana Zonkeys roster
Players
Coaches

Pos.	No.	Nat.	Name	Ht.	Wt.
PF	0	(Mexico)	Jaimes, Fabián	1.98 m (6 ft 6 in)
SF	1	(United States)	Williams, Alex Kaye	1.99 m (6 ft 6 in)
SF	7	(Mexico)	De Haro, Omar	1.88 m (6 ft 2 in)
PF	10	(United States)	Pruitt, Akia	2.03 m (6 ft 8 in)
PG	12	(United States)	Rector, Shane	1.85 m (6 ft 1 in)
SF	13	(United States)	Jones, Perry	2.11 m (6 ft 11 in)
C	17	(Mexico)	Olivas, Alan	2.04 m (6 ft 8 in)
SF	18	(Mexico)	Romero, Oscar	1.94 m (6 ft 4 in)
PG	24	(United States)	Phelps, Zhuric	1.93 m (6 ft 4 in)
PG	27	(Panama)	Girón, Daniel	1.88 m (6 ft 2 in)
C	31	(Trinidad and Tobago)	Narcis, Jabari	2.08 m (6 ft 10 in)
C	55	(United States)	Lightfoot, Jaquan	2.00 m (6 ft 7 in)

Head coach

- (Dominican Republic) Luis Flores

Assistant coach(es)

- (Mexico) Pavel Arreola
- (Mexico) Paloma Zapata

Legend

- (C) Team captain
- (I) Import player
- Injured

- Roster
Updated: May 4, 2020

== Notable players ==
Note: Flags indicate national team eligibility at FIBA-sanctioned events. Players may hold other non-FIBA nationalities not displayed.

Criteria

To appear in this section a player must have either:

- Set a club record or won an individual award while at the club
- Played at least one official international match for their national team at any time
- Played at least one official NBA match at any time.

- (Mexico) Víctor Ávila
- (Mexico) Idris Ibn Idris
- (Mexico) Adam Parada
- (Mexico) Omar Quintero
- (Mexico) Adrián Zamora
- (United States) Mychal Ammons
- (United States) Solomon Jones
- (United States) Antoine Wright

== See also ==
- Tijuana Zebra
- Circuito de Baloncesto de la Costa del Pacífico
- Federación Mexicana de Baloncesto
