= Zonkey (Tijuana) =

Donkeys painted with fake zebra stripes

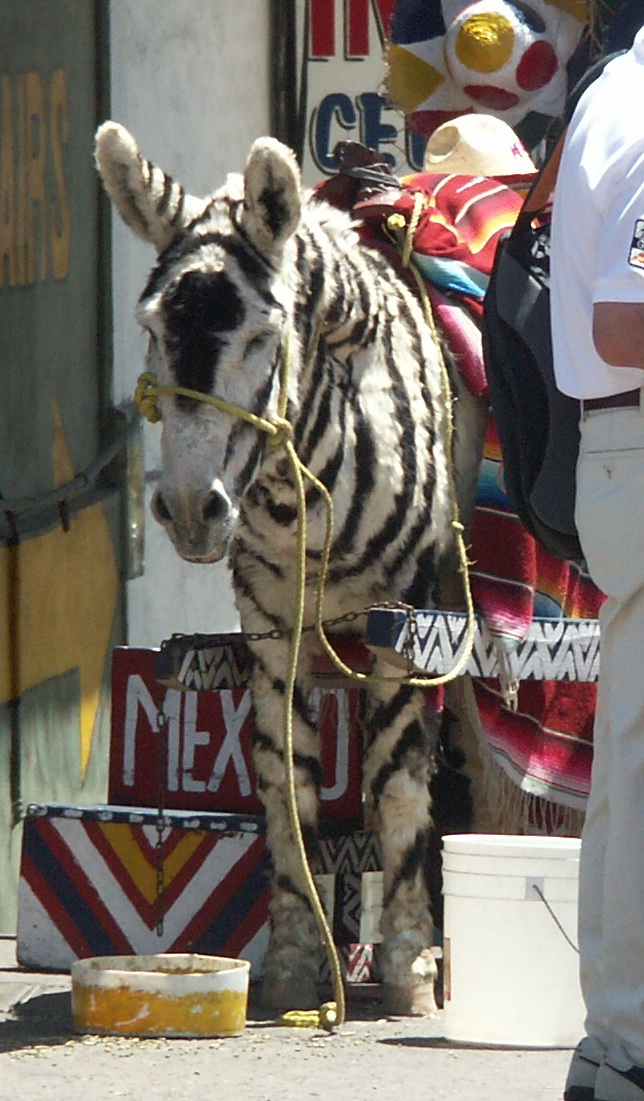
A zonkey in Tijuana, Mexico

Zonkeys in Tijuana, Mexico are donkeys (also known as burros in Mexico and the Southwestern United States; burro is the Spanish word for donkey) painted with fake zebra stripes, so that tourists will pay the owner to appear in souvenir photos with them. They should not be confused with zebroids, zebra hybrids which are also sometimes called zonkeys.

== History ==
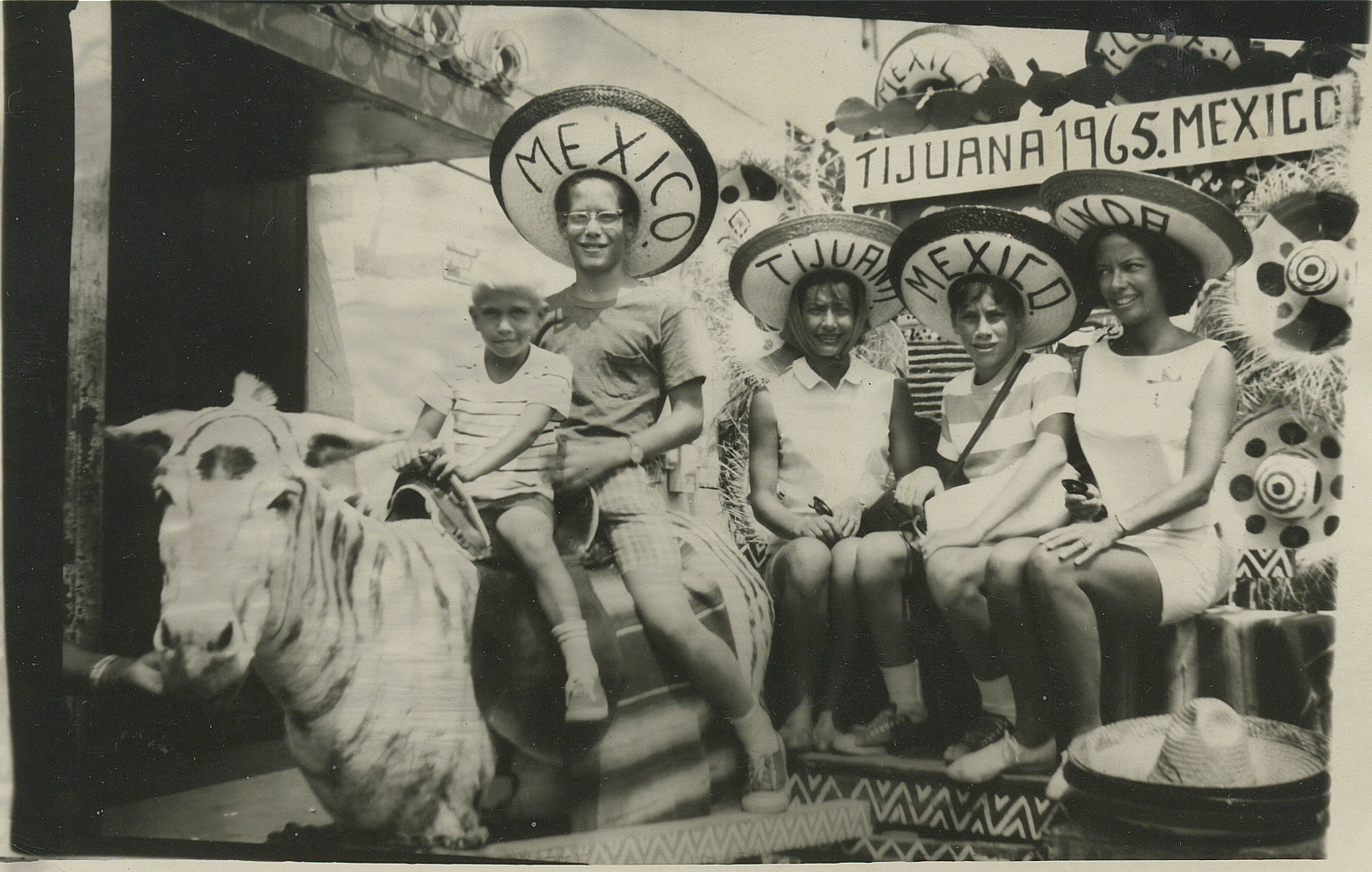
Tourist souvenir photograph with a zonkey in 1965

In 1978, journalist Laurie Becklund reported in the Los Angeles Times that, according to the burro cart owners of that time, the practice began in the mid-1930s after gambling was prohibited in Mexico and Tijuana's Agua Caliente Casino was closed. The casino had two plain burro carts at its entrance and tourists often took photographs with them. Entrepreneurs created and brought similar carts to the shopping areas on and around Avenida Revolución, charging tourists to take pictures seated in them. The entrepreneurs added elements that they thought that tourists would consider to be typically Mexican to the carts, such as painting of scenery and cacti, and serapes. Approximately in the late 1940s, one of the over 20 cart owners – which owner exactly is disputed – added stripes to his burro in order to create more impressive photographs, which were sepia or black-and-white during that era, and thus white or naturally colored donkeys did not show up well.

A 2013 report by National Public Radio stated that the number of zonkeys in Downtown Tijuana had shrunk to three, due to the decline in American visitors after 9/11 and hours-long waits to return to the U.S. from Tijuana. At that time Tijuana preservation Uni2 had begun efforts to help ensure that the zonkey tradition continued on Tijuana's streets.

== Zonkeys in Tijuana culture ==
Zonkeys have become an iconic symbol or image representing Tijuana, in particular its origins as a place providing entertainment, sometimes unusual, to American visitors. The Council of Baja California Cultural Heritage had declared zonkey to be part of the state's cultural heritage, although this was later rejected by a court in 2017, largely due to concerns of animal-rights activists.

The city has a professional basketball team whose name is inspired by the zonkey as a mascot: the Tijuana Zonkeys.

== See also ==
- Zebroid
- Tijuana Zonkeys
