= 2015 CBC Championship squads =

2015 FIBA CBC Championship squads

This article displays the rosters for the participating teams at the 2015 FIBA CBC Championship. The player ages are as of June 15, which was the first day of the tournament.

== Group A ==
=== British Virgin Islands ===
British Virgin Islands men's national basketball team roster
Players
Coaches

Pos.	No.	Name	Age – Date of birth	Height	Club
G	4	Killven Samuel	25 – 7 July 1989	1.88 m (6 ft 2 in)	Northeastern State RiverHawks	(United States)
F	5	Steve Parillon	36 – 7 October 1978	1.96 m (6 ft 5 in)	Mega Mix (British Virgin Islands)	(British Virgin Islands)
G	6	Franklyn Penn	21 – 26 October 1993	1.85 m (6 ft 1 in)
F	7	Norville Carey	21 – 3 August 1993	2.01 m (6 ft 7 in)	Southern Miss Golden Eagles basketball	(United States)
F	8	Kennedy Bass	34 – 6 April 1981	1.96 m (6 ft 5 in)	Young Legs (British Virgin Islands)	(British Virgin Islands)
G	9	Halstead Chiverton	33 – 14 May 1982	1.93 m (6 ft 4 in)	Warner University Royals	(United States)
G	10	Dione Blyden	22 – 5 October 1992	1.85 m (6 ft 1 in)	Clinton Community College (Iowa)	(United States)
C	11	Kleon Penn	28 – 1 September 1986	2.13 m (7 ft 0 in)	free agent
G	12	Bjorn Caleb	23 – 4 October 1991	1.82 m (6 ft 0 in)
F	13	Randy George	34 – 10 January 1981	2.02 m (6 ft 8 in)	La Charite	(France)
F	14	Leslee Smith	24 – 17 July 1990	2.03 m (6 ft 8 in)	La Salle Tarija	(Bolivia)
G	15	Eustace Freeman	34 – 27 December 1980	1.71 m (5 ft 7 in)	Bad Boys (British Virgin Islands)	(British Virgin Islands)

Head coach

- (British Virgin Islands) Keith Malone

Assistant coach(es)

- (British Virgin Islands) Trevor Stevens

Legend

- Club – describes last
  club before the tournament

Roster

National Team at LatinBasket.com

=== Cayman Islands ===
Cayman Islands men's national basketball team roster
Players
Coaches

Pos.	No.	Name	Age – Date of birth	Height	Club
F	4	Joshua Dikau	20 – 26 August 1994	1.90 m (6 ft 3 in)
G/F	5	Jorge Ebanks	29 – 2 March 1986	1.85 m (6 ft 1 in)	Cheshire Phoenix	(United Kingdom)
G	6	Samuel O'Garro	27 – 10 February 1988	1.95 m (6 ft 5 in)	Sol Blazers	(Cayman Islands)
G/F	8	Shaad O'Garro	24 – 25 July 1990	1.99 m (6 ft 6 in)	Sol Blazers	(Cayman Islands)
F	9	Jasen Campbell	28 – 12 November 1986	1.90 m (6 ft 3 in)	Silver Bullets (Cayman Islands)	(Cayman Islands)
G	10	Davion Cotterell	23 – 4 October 1991	1.88 m (6 ft 2 in)	Sol Blazers	(Cayman Islands)
C	11	Xavier Powery-Saunds	22 – 19 January 1993	2.03 m (6 ft 8 in)
F	12	Jake Whittaker	23 – 16 September 1991	1.93 m (6 ft 4 in)	Silver Bullets (Cayman Islands)	(Cayman Islands)
F	13	Deandre Simpson	24 – 27 October 1990	1.96 m (6 ft 5 in)	Sol Blazers	(Cayman Islands)
C	14	Darrell Paddyfoot	24 – 17 July 1990	2.03 m (6 ft 8 in)	Warriors (Cayman Islands)	(Cayman Islands)
C	15	Rotando Thompson	30 – 28 November 1984	2.03 m (6 ft 8 in)	Silver Bullets (Cayman Islands)	(Cayman Islands)

Head coach

- (Cayman Islands) Edwin Pellot-Rosa

Assistant coach(es)

- (Cayman Islands) Duran Whittaker

Legend

- Club – describes last
  club before the tournament

Roster

National Team at LatinBasket.com

=== St. Vincent and the Grenadines ===
Saint Vincent and the Grenadines men's national basketball team roster
Players
Coaches

Pos.	No.	Name	Age – Date of birth	Height	Club
F/C	4	Nyika Williams	27 – July 9, 1987	6 ft 8 in (2.03 m)	Saitama Broncos	(Japan)
G	5	Steveon Taylor	27 – March 5, 1988	6 ft 1 in (1.85 m)
F	6	Brian Ofori	23 – April 28, 1992	6 ft 5 in (1.96 m)	UPEI Panthers	(Canada)
G	7	Quincy Jackson	37 – May 26, 1978	6 ft 2 in (1.88 m)	San Jacinto Central	(United States)
G	8	Sean Baptiste	27 – April 4, 1988	6 ft 3 in (1.91 m)	Metrowest Ballas	(United States)
G	9	Lezlo McKenzie	35 – October 14, 1979	5 ft 11 in (1.8 m)
C	10	Shawn King	33 – June 6, 1982	6 ft 10 in (2.08 m)	STB Le Havre	(France)
C	11	Akeme Smart	24 – February 15, 1991	7 ft 3 in (2.21 m)	Servigroup Benidorm	(Spain)
F	12	Alexis Foyle	36 – September 17, 1978	6 ft 6 in (1.98 m)	Blacktop Showcase	(Italy)
F	13	Burton Williams	34 – December 8, 1980	6 ft 7 in (2.01 m)	Queens College, City University of New York	(United States)
F	14	Cregg Friday	26 – January 30, 1989	6 ft 9 in (2.06 m)
F	15	Dameon Ottley	26 – December 30, 1988	6 ft 9 in (2.06 m)		(British Virgin Islands)

Head coach

(United States) Justin Scott

Assistant coach(es)

- (Saint Vincent and the Grenadines) Wayne Williams
- (Saint Vincent and the Grenadines) Sabrina Mitchell

Legend

- Club – describes last
  club before the tournament
- Age – describes age
  on 20 August 2015

== Group B ==
=== Bermuda ===
Bermuda men's national basketball team roster
Players
Coaches

Pos.	No.	Name	Age – Date of birth	Height	Club
G	3	Husayn Symonds	29 – 28 December 1985	1.85 m (6 ft 1 in)		(Bermuda)
F	4	Yusuf Riley	20 – 3 September 1994	1.96 m (6 ft 5 in)	Paine College	(United States)
G/F	5	Chris Crumpler	32 – 26 March 1983	1.91 m (6 ft 3 in)	Paget Bear Cats	(Bermuda)
G/F	7	Shannon Thompson	29 – 8 October 1985	1.78 m (5 ft 10 in)	Warwick Rim Rockers	(Bermuda)
G	8	Steven Simons	33 – 28 March 1982	1.80 m (5 ft 11 in)	Smith's Wild Cats	(Bermuda)
G/F	9	John Lee	33 – 22 April 1982	1.91 m (6 ft 3 in)	Devonshire Dragons	(Bermuda)
F	10	Jason Simons	28 – 14 October 1986	1.90 m (6 ft 3 in)	Smith's Wild Cats	(Bermuda)
C	11	Jonathan Lowe	30 – 3 March 1985	2.01 m (6 ft 7 in)	Johnson & Wales University	(United States)
G/F	12	Sullivan Phillips	36 – 9 February 1979	1.98 m (6 ft 6 in)	BG 74 Göttingen	(Germany)
F	14	Jahvon Jones	32 – 6 May 1983	1.98 m (6 ft 6 in)	St. George's International	(Bermuda)
G/F	15	Jason Lowe	30 – 3 March 1985	1.93 m (6 ft 4 in)	Somerset Flyers	(Bermuda)

Head coach

- (Bermuda) Roderick Spencer

Assistant coach(es)

- (Bermuda) Gavin MacKenzie

Legend

- Club – describes last
  club before the tournament
- Age – describes age
  on 15 June 2015

Roster

National Team at LatinBasket.com

=== Guyana ===
Guyana men's national basketball team roster
Players
Coaches

Pos.	No.	Name	Age – Date of birth	Height	Club
G	4	Dave Causway	27 – April 4, 1988	5 ft 7 in (1.7 m)	Royal Extra Lions	(Trinidad and Tobago)
PF	5	Gordon James	35 – December 28, 1979	6 ft 6 in (1.98 m)	Alianza Viedma	(Argentina)
SF	6	Travis Burnett	26 – June 23, 1988	6 ft 3 in (1.91 m)
SF	7	Akeem Kanhai	23 – July 23, 1991	6 ft 4 in (1.93 m)
PF	8	Ryan Gullen	29 – May 3, 1986	6 ft 3 in (1.91 m)	Pacesetters	(Guyana)
SG	9	Jason Squires	29 – December 2, 1985	5 ft 10 in (1.78 m)
G	10	Ryan Stephney	29 – February 24, 1986	6 ft 0 in (1.83 m)
G	11	Shelroy Thomas	24 – December 30, 1990	6 ft 1 in (1.85 m)
C	12	Jermaine Slater	25 – September 6, 1989	6 ft 6 in (1.98 m)
PG	13	Chris Williams	25 – August 17, 1989	6 ft 2 in (1.88 m)
C	14	Rudolph James	33 – April 15, 1982	6 ft 8 in (2.03 m)
SF	15	Keron McKenzie	28 – November 19, 1986	6 ft 7 in (2.01 m)	Atlanta Assault	(United States)

Head coach

- (Guyana) Darcell Harris

Assistant coach(es)

- (Guyana) Marlon Rodriguez

Legend

- Club – describes last
  club before the tournament
- Age – describes age
  on 20 August 2015
