= 2013 FIBA Americas Championship qualification =

The qualification for the 2013 FIBA Americas Championship in Venezuela was held as early as 2011 until 2012. There are several stages of qualification for some teams.

== Qualification format ==
Each FIBA Americas subzone has a specific number of berths, generally based on the relative strengths of its member national teams. For the 2013 FIBA Americas Championship, the berths distribution is:

Zone	Total berths
North America	2
Central America and Caribbean	4
South America	3
Host team	1
Total	10

=== North America ===
For the North American zone, since there are only 2 member teams (Canada and the United States), and there are 2 berths, this means there no more qualification games to be held. Furthermore, the United States won the 2012 Olympic gold medal and was thus automatically qualified for the 2014 FIBA Basketball World Cup, thus allowing Canada to earn an automatic qualification. This means they do not have to participate, resulting in their non-participation. This opens up an extra berth, which was awarded to the fourth placed team in the South American Basketball Championship 2012. With hosts Venezuela losing in the final, the fifth placed team was invited.

=== Central America and Caribbean ===
Some teams from the Central America and Caribbean Commission Zone had to qualify for the 2012 Centrobasket. The qualifying tournament was the 2011 FIBA CBC Championship for Caribbean teams. A FIBA COCABA Championship was supposedly held for teams from Mexico and Central America, but was no longer held; the supposed participants in that tournament automatically qualified to the 2012 Centrobasket.

=== South America ===
The 2012 South American Basketball Championship determined the teams that will qualify for 2013 FIBA Americas Championship. Since the USA is skipping this tournament, this opened up an additional berth for South American teams, increasing the number of berths from three to four, excluding Venezuela's berth as a host. This brings the number of South America's teams to five.

== 2011 FIBA CBC Championship ==
The 2011 FIBC CBC Championship in the Bahamas serves as the qualifier for the 2012 Centrobasket for Caribbean national teams. The top three advance to the Centrobasket.

=== Preliminary round ===
Advances to the knockout round
Advances to the classification round

==== Group A ====
Team	Pld	W	L	PF	PA	PD	Pts
Virgin Islands	3	3	0	281	185	+96	6
Jamaica	3	2	1	228	207	+21	5
Antigua and Barbuda	3	1	2	227	227	0	4
Guyana	3	0	3	145	262	−117	3

23 July 2011

Jamaica	92–78	Antigua and Barbuda

San Salvador, El Salvador

24 July 2011

Antigua and Barbuda	73–84	Virgin Islands

San Salvador, El Salvador

25 July 2011

Guyana	43–75	Jamaica

San Salvador, El Salvador

26 July 2011

Virgin Islands	111–51	Guyana

San Salvador, El Salvador

27 July 2011

Guyana	51–76	Antigua and Barbuda

San Salvador, El Salvador

27 July 2011

Virgin Islands	86–61	Jamaica

San Salvador, El Salvador

==== Group B ====
Team	Pld	W	L	PF	PA	PD	Pts
Bahamas	4	4	0	355	201	+154	8
British Virgin Islands	4	3	1	264	260	+4	7
Bermuda	4	2	2	233	245	−12	6
Saint Vincent and the Grenadines	4	1	3	249	322	−73	5
Cayman Islands	4	0	4	213	286	−73	4

23 July 2011

Bermuda	75–56	Saint Vincent and the Grenadines

Nassau, Bahamas

23 July 2011

Bahamas	94–41	Cayman Islands

Nassau, Bahamas

24 July 2011

Cayman Islands	54–66	British Virgin Islands

Nassau, Bahamas

24 July 2011

Bermuda	41–75	Bahamas

Nassau, Bahamas

25 July 2011

British Virgin Islands	66–63	Bermuda

Nassau, Bahamas

25 July 2011

Bahamas	80–61	Saint Vincent and the Grenadines

Nassau, Bahamas

26 July 2011

Saint Vincent and the Grenadines	72–70	Cayman Islands

Nassau, Bahamas

26 July 2011

Bahamas	80–61	British Virgin Islands

Nassau, Bahamas

27 July 2011

Bermuda	54–48	Cayman Islands

Nassau, Bahamas

27 July 2011

British Virgin Islands	71–63	Saint Vincent and the Grenadines

Nassau, Bahamas

=== Classification round ===
Semifinals
28 July 2011
Antigua and Barbuda	82
Saint Vincent and the Grenadines	66
28 July 2011
Bermuda	68
Guyana	58

5th place
29 July 2011
Antigua and Barbuda	78
Bermuda	86
7th place
29 July 2011
Saint Vincent and the Grenadines	64
Guyana	83

=== Knockout round ===
Semifinals
28 July 2011
Virgin Islands	79
British Virgin Islands	73
28 July 2011
Bahamas	78
Jamaica	75

Final
29 July 2011
Virgin Islands (OT)	91
Bahamas	89
3rd place
29 July 2011
British Virgin Islands	54
Jamaica	55

=== Final ranking ===
This were the final rankings. The top 3 teams qualify for the 2012 Centrobasket.

Qualifies to the 2012 Centrobasket

Rank	Team
1st place, gold medalist(s)	Virgin Islands
2nd place, silver medalist(s)	Bahamas
3rd place, bronze medalist(s)	Jamaica
4	British Virgin Islands
5	Bermuda
6	Antigua and Barbuda
7	Guyana
8	Saint Vincent and the Grenadines
9	Cayman Islands

== 2012 Centrobasket ==
=== Final ranking ===
Qualifies to the 2013 FIBA Americas Championship
Qualifies to the 2013 FIBA Americas Championship as a wildcard
Suspended by FIBA and disqualified

Rank	Team
1st place, gold medalist(s)	Dominican Republic
2nd place, silver medalist(s)	Puerto Rico
3rd place, bronze medalist(s)	Jamaica
4	Panama
5	Bahamas
6	Mexico
7	Virgin Islands
8	Cuba
9	Costa Rica
9	Nicaragua

=== Suspension of Panama ===
FIBA suspended the Panamanian Basketball Federation "for many problems that Panama has been going through for several years due to conflicts of interest between two Directives that manifest hold the same authority," as announced by FIBA Secretary-General Patrick Baumann. This means Panama's "national teams and clubs and referees, cannot participate in any international competition."

== South American Basketball Championship 2012 ==
=== Final ranking ===
This is the final ranking for the participating teams The top three teams excluding Venezuela qualify, but with the non-participation of the United States, the fourth-best team excluding Venezuela was also included.

Qualifies to the 2013 FIBA Americas Championship

Rank	Team
1st place, gold medalist(s)	Argentina
2nd place, silver medalist(s)	Venezuela
3rd place, bronze medalist(s)	Uruguay
4	Brazil
5	Paraguay
6	Chile
7	Bolivia; Colombia
