= 2015 CBC Championship =

This page shows the results of the 2015 FIBA CBC Championship, which was held in the city of Road Town, British Virgin Islands from June 15 to June 21, 2015.

== Group stage ==
=== Group A ===
Pos	Team	Pld	W	L	PF	PA	PD	Pts	Qualification
1	Virgin Islands	4	4	0	337	268	+69	8	Advance to Semifinals
2	British Virgin Islands	4	2	2	322	313	+9	6	Advance to Semifinals
3	Barbados	4	2	2	296	274	+22	6	Classification Classification 5-8
4	Saint Vincent and the Grenadines	4	2	2	281	311	−30	6	Classification Classification 5-8
5	Cayman Islands	4	0	4	264	334	−70	4	Classification Classification 9-10

Source: fiba.com

15 June 2015
13:00

Boxscore

Cayman Islands	65–77	Virgin Islands
Scoring by quarter: 13-8, 11-25, 13-27, 28-17
Pts: Ebanks 21; Rebs: Simpson 7 Asts: Ebanks 4		Pts: Hart 17; Rebs: Milligan 9 Asts: Sheppard 5

Multi-Purpose Sports Complex, Road Town (BVI)

15 June 2015
21:00

Boxscore

Saint Vincent and the Grenadines	69–84	British Virgin Islands
Scoring by quarter: 17-23, 15-18, 24-18, 13-25
Pts: Foyle 29; Rebs: King 15; Asts: N.Williams 5		Pts: Chiverton 18; Rebs: Carey 10; Asts: Samuel 6

Multi-Purpose Sports Complex, Road Town (BVI)

16 June 2015
16:15

Boxscore Archived 2015-09-24 at the Wayback Machine

Barbados	63–70	Saint Vincent and the Grenadines
Scoring by quarter: 9-27, 17-13, 19-14, 18-16
Pts: Marsh, Jones 14; Rebs: Marsh 11; Asts: Gill 9		Pts: Baptiste 21; Rebs: King 16; Asts: N.Williams 4

Multi-Purpose Sports Complex, Road Town (BVI)

16 June 2015
21:00

Boxscore

British Virgin Islands	92–78	Cayman Islands
Scoring by quarter: 16-20, 28-16, 29-20, 19-22
Pts: Samuel, Bass 15; Rebs: Bass 9 Asts: Chiverton 4		Pts: Sa.Ogarro 25; Rebs: Ebanks 5 Asts: Ebanks, Sa.Ogarro 3

Multi-Purpose Sports Complex, Road Town (BVI)

17 June 2015
18:45

Boxscore

Saint Vincent and the Grenadines	62–93	Virgin Islands
Scoring by quarter: 7-30, 14-20, 23-21, 18-22
Pts: Baptiste 19; Rebs: Foyle 8 Asts: McKenzie, Foyle 2		Pts: Hart 21; Rebs: Victor 12; Asts: Rivera 10

Multi-Purpose Sports Complex, Road Town (BVI)

17 June 2015
21:00

Boxscore

British Virgin Islands	76–77	Barbados
Scoring by quarter: 14-9, 21-33, 11-19, 30-16
Pts: George 17; Rebs: George 10; Asts: Bass 4		Pts: Birkett 30; Rebs: Marsh 9 Asts: Gill 6

Multi-Purpose Sports Complex, Road Town (BVI)

18 June 2015
14:00

Boxscore

Cayman Islands	71–80	Saint Vincent and the Grenadines
Scoring by quarter: 14-20, 20-17, 23-19, 14-24
Pts: Ebanks 32; Rebs: Sh.Ogarro 9 Asts: 3 players 4		Pts: Baptiste 25; Rebs: King 18; Asts: Baptiste 7

Multi-Purpose Sports Complex, Road Town (BVI)

18 June 2015
21:00

Boxscore

Virgin Islands	78–71	Barbados
Scoring by quarter: 23-14, 22-14, 11-22, 22-21
Pts: Aska 26; Rebs: Williams Jr. 10; Asts: Rivera 7		Pts: Marsh 17; Rebs: Marsh 20; Asts: 3 players 2

Multi-Purpose Sports Complex, Road Town (BVI)

19 June 2015
16:15

Boxscore

Barbados	85–50	Cayman Islands
Scoring by quarter: 19-12, 23-10, 16-20, 27-8
Pts: Marsh 16; Rebs: Marsh 10; Asts: Birkett, Gill 5		Pts: Ebanks 15; Rebs: Simpson 7 Asts: Sh.Ogarro 5

Multi-Purpose Sports Complex, Road Town (BVI)

19 June 2015
21:00

Boxscore

Virgin Islands	89–70	British Virgin Islands
Scoring by quarter: 21-17, 24-17, 19-16, 25-20
Pts: Hart 20; Rebs: Victor 9 Asts: Rivera 7		Pts: F.Penn 22; Rebs: George 8 Asts: Bass 3

Multi-Purpose Sports Complex, Road Town (BVI)

=== Group B ===
Pos	Team	Pld	W	L	PF	PA	PD	Pts	Qualification
1	Bahamas	4	4	0	287	225	+62	8	Advance to Semifinals
2	Antigua and Barbuda	4	3	1	297	243	+54	7	Advance to Semifinals
3	Bermuda	4	2	2	247	243	+4	6	Classification Classification 5-8
4	Suriname	4	1	3	238	276	−38	5	Classification Classification 5-8
5	Guyana	4	0	4	242	324	−82	4	Classification Classification 9-10

Source: fiba.com

15 June 2015
15:15

Boxscore

Bahamas	57–38	Bermuda
Scoring by quarter: 10-9, 13-12, 17-11, 17-6
Pts: Rolle 11; Rebs: Nesbitt 10; Asts: Cox 3		Pts: Ja.Lowe 15; Rebs: Crumpler 7 Asts: Phillips 5

Multi-Purpose Sports Complex, Road Town (BVI)

15 June 2015
18:45

Boxscore

Antigua and Barbuda	80–60	Guyana
Scoring by quarter: 21-12, 21-13, 23-21, 15-14
Pts: Richardson 14; Rebs: Looby 11; Asts: Richardson 5		Pts: James 19; Rebs: James 15; Asts: 3 players 2

Multi-Purpose Sports Complex, Road Town (BVI)

16 June 2015
14:00

Boxscore

Suriname	50–85	Antigua and Barbuda
Scoring by quarter: 13-29, 9-22, 10-20, 18-14
Pts: Goedschalk 11; Rebs: Van Russell 7 Asts: Van Russell 4		Pts: Looby 13; Rebs: Scott 9 Asts: 3 players 4

Multi-Purpose Sports Complex, Road Town (BVI)

16 June 2015
18:45

Boxscore

Guyana	69–89	Bahamas
Scoring by quarter: 18-27, 21-26, 13-14, 17-22
Pts: Causway 19; Rebs: James 11; Asts: Stephney 4		Pts: Smith 18; Rebs: Rolle 9 Asts: Cooper 4

Multi-Purpose Sports Complex, Road Town (BVI)

17 June 2015
14:00

Boxscore

Guyana	65–74	Bermuda
Scoring by quarter: 9-15, 14-17, 22-18, 20-24
Pts: James 22; Rebs: Kanhai 12; Asts: Burnett 4		Pts: Phillips 24; Rebs: Phillips 11; Asts: Phillips 7

Multi-Purpose Sports Complex, Road Town (BVI)

17 June 2015
16:15

Boxscore

Suriname	57–72	Bahamas
Scoring by quarter: 14-21, 14-18, 8-11, 21-22
Pts: Zamuel 11; Rebs: 3 players 5 Asts: 3 players 3		Pts: Bain 11; Rebs: Bain, Coleby 9 Asts: Cooper 3

Multi-Purpose Sports Complex, Road Town (BVI)

18 June 2015
16:15

Boxscore

Bermuda	71–50	Suriname
Scoring by quarter: 21-6, 17-21, 13-15, 20-8
Pts: Crumpler 22; Rebs: Ja.Lowe 10; Asts: Phillips 5		Pts: Goedschalk, De Randamie 11; Rebs: De Randamie 7 Asts: Sabajo 5

Multi-Purpose Sports Complex, Road Town (BVI)

18 June 2015
18:45

Boxscore

Bahamas	69–61	Antigua and Barbuda
Scoring by quarter: 16-18, 20-11, 19-12, 14-20
Pts: Nesbitt 16; Rebs: Nesbitt 10; Asts: Cooper 4		Pts: Burton, Sergeant 13; Rebs: Looby 9 Asts: McCoy 6

Multi-Purpose Sports Complex, Road Town (BVI)

19 June 2015
14:00

Boxscore

Antigua and Barbuda	71–64	Bermuda
Scoring by quarter: 16-10, 17-13, 22-21, 16-20
Pts: Scott 19; Rebs: Looby 11; Asts: McCoy 5		Pts: Crumpler 15; Rebs: Riley, Phillips 7 Asts: Phillips 4

Multi-Purpose Sports Complex, Road Town (BVI)

19 June 2015
18:45

Boxscore

Suriname	81–48	Guyana
Scoring by quarter: 15-10, 28-15, 14-9, 24-14
Pts: De Randamie 13; Rebs: Van Russell 9 Asts: Sabajo, Fraser 3		Pts: McKenzie 15; Rebs: Kanhai 8 Asts: Kanhai 2

Multi-Purpose Sports Complex, Road Town (BVI)

== Final round ==
=== 5th-8th place classification bracket ===
5th-8th place semifinals
June 20, 2015
(Saint Vincent and the Grenadines) Saint Vincent and The Grenadines	74
Bermuda	73
June 20, 2015
Barbados	49
Suriname	71

5th place game
June 21, 2015
(Saint Vincent and the Grenadines) Saint Vincent & The Grenadines	80
Suriname	87
Third place
June 21, 2015
Bermuda	73
Barbados	78

=== Medal bracket ===
Semifinals (20 June)
A1	(United States Virgin Islands) U.S. Virgin Islands	108
B2	Antigua and Barbuda	66
B1	(The Bahamas) Bahamas	85
A2	British Virgin Islands	68

Championship final (21 June - 08:45 pm)
A1	(United States Virgin Islands) U.S. Virgin Islands	71
B1	(The Bahamas) Bahamas	65
3rd place match (21 June - 06:30 pm)
B2	Antigua and Barbuda	82
A2	British Virgin Islands	73

=== 5th-8th place classification playoffs ===
20 June 2015
14:00

Boxscore

Saint Vincent and the Grenadines	74–73	Bermuda
Scoring by quarter: 16-19, 20-8, 20-15, 18-31
Pts: Foyle 19; Rebs: King 16; Asts: Baptiste 7		Pts: Crumpler 23; Rebs: Jo.Lowe 9 Asts: Crumpler 6

Multi-Purpose Sports Complex, Road Town (BVI)

20 June 2015
16:15

Boxscore

Barbados	49–71	Suriname
Scoring by quarter: 9-18, 9-9, 21-20, 10-24
Pts: Marsh 10; Rebs: Marsh 11; Asts: Gill 2		Pts: De Randamie 19; Rebs: 3 players 6 Asts: De Randamie, Sabajo 5

Multi-Purpose Sports Complex, Road Town (BVI)

=== Semifinals ===
20 June 2015
18:45

Boxscore

Antigua and Barbuda	66–108	Virgin Islands
Scoring by quarter: 7-25, 20-22, 25-34, 14-27
Pts: Scott 15; Rebs: Scott 8 Asts: Scott, Richardson 3		Pts: Victor 21; Rebs: Victor, Rhymer 11; Asts: Rivera 9

Multi-Purpose Sports Complex, Road Town (BVI)

20 June 2015
21:00

Boxscore

British Virgin Islands	68–85	Bahamas
Scoring by quarter: 14-25, 16-25, 17-19, 21-16
Pts: Carey, K.Penn 13; Rebs: K.Penn 13; Asts: Samuel 3		Pts: Rolle 14; Rebs: Nesbitt 9 Asts: Cox 6

Multi-Purpose Sports Complex, Road Town (BVI)

== Final classification games ==
=== Ninth place game ===
20 June 2015
11:45

Boxscore

Cayman Islands	89–61	Guyana
Scoring by quarter: 18-10, 28-14, 20-11, 23-26
Pts: Ebanks 24; Rebs: Sa.Ogarro, Simpson 8 Asts: Ebanks 5		Pts: Gullen 17; Rebs: Burnett 10; Asts: Kanhai 4

Multi-Purpose Sports Complex, Road Town (BVI)

=== Seventh place game ===
21 June 2015
14:00

Boxscore

Bermuda	73–78	Barbados
Scoring by quarter: 18-21, 16-18, 23-19, 16-20
Pts: Crumpler 27; Rebs: Lee 10; Asts: Phillips 6		Pts: Birkett 21; Rebs: Marsh 13; Asts: Gibbons 6

Multi-Purpose Sports Complex, Road Town (BVI)

=== Fifth place game ===
21 June 2015
16:15

Boxscore

Saint Vincent and the Grenadines	80–87	Suriname
Scoring by quarter: 26-13, 19-26, 20-8, 15-40
Pts: Foyle 23; Rebs: King 18; Asts: McKenzie 9		Pts: Goedschalk, De Randamie 14; Rebs: De Randamie 12; Asts: De Randamie 7

Multi-Purpose Sports Complex, Road Town (BVI)

=== Third place game ===
21 June 2015
18:30

Boxscore

British Virgin Islands	73–82	Antigua and Barbuda
Scoring by quarter: 20-17, 14-21, 16-16, 23-28
Pts: Chiverton 22; Rebs: Carey 8 Asts: F.Penn 4		Pts: Scott 24; Rebs: Burton, Scott 11; Asts: McCoy 4

Multi-Purpose Sports Complex, Road Town (BVI)

=== Final ===
21 June 2015
20:45

Boxscore

Bahamas	65–71	Virgin Islands
Scoring by quarter: 12-18, 23-19, 21-16, 9-18
Pts: Coleby 15; Rebs: Smith 8 Asts: Cox 4		Pts: Hart 24; Rebs: Aska 10; Asts: Rivera 4

Multi-Purpose Sports Complex, Road Town (BVI)

== Awards ==
Most Valuable Player
(United States Virgin Islands) Ivan Aska

== Final standings ==
Qualified for the 2016 Centrobasket.

Rank	Team
1st place, gold medalist(s)	Virgin Islands
2nd place, silver medalist(s)	Bahamas
3rd place, bronze medalist(s)	Antigua and Barbuda
4	British Virgin Islands
5	Suriname
6	Saint Vincent and the Grenadines
7	Barbados
8	Bermuda
9	Cayman Islands
10	Guyana
