= Basketball at the 2011 Island Games – Men's tournament =

The men's tournament was held from 26 June–1 July 2011 at the Medina Leisure Centre, Newport and Cowes High School, Cowes.

== Format ==
The 11 teams were split into four groups, three of three teams while one group just had two teams. The 2 best teams of each group advanced to the quarterfinals, while the last team of Group A–C played for places 9–11.

== Teams ==
- Bermuda
- Cayman Islands
- Frøya
- Gibraltar
- Guernsey
- Jersey
- Isle of Man
- Isle of Wight
- Menorca
- Rhodes
- Saare County

== Group stage ==
=== Group A ===
Team	Pld	W	L	PF	PA	PD	Pts.
Saare County	2	2	0	205	102	+103	4
Bermuda	2	1	1	199	85	+114	3
Frøya	2	0	2	45	262	−217	2

June 26, 2011
11:30

Bermuda	129–13	Frøya

Medina Leisure Centre, Newport

June 27, 2011
17:30

Saare County	72–70	Bermuda

Medina Leisure Centre, Newport

June 28, 2011
13:30

Frøya	32–133	Saare County

Medina Leisure Centre, Newport

=== Group B ===
Team	Pld	W	L	PF	PA	PD	Pts.
Menorca	2	2	0	195	79	+116	4
Isle of Wight	2	1	1	119	154	−35	3
Isle of Man	2	0	2	84	165	−81	2

June 26, 2011
15:30

Isle of Wight	70–54	Isle of Man

Medina Leisure Centre, Newport

June 27, 2011
11:30

Isle of Man	30–95	Menorca

Medina Leisure Centre, Newport

June 28, 2011
13:30

Menorca	100–49	Isle of Wight

Medina Leisure Centre, Newport

=== Group C ===
Team	Pld	W	L	PF	PA	PD	Pts.
Rhodes	2	2	0	191	100	+91	4
Gibraltar	2	1	1	130	139	−9	3
Jersey	2	0	2	83	165	−82	2

June 26, 2011
13:30

Rhodes	91–44	Jersey

Medina Leisure Centre, Newport

June 27, 2011
15:30

Jersey	39–74	Gibraltar

Medina Leisure Centre, Newport

June 28, 2011
11:30

Gibraltar	56–100	Rhodes

Medina Leisure Centre, Newport

=== Group D ===
Team	Pld	W	L	PF	PA	PD	Pts.
Cayman Islands	2	2	0	164	84	+80	4
Guernsey	2	0	2	84	164	−80	2

June 26, 2011
17:30

Guernsey	35–67	Cayman Islands

Medina Leisure Centre, Newport

June 27, 2011
13:30

Cayman Islands	97–49	Guernsey

Medina Leisure Centre, Newport

== Placement group ==
Team	Pld	W	L	PF	PA	PD	Pts.
Jersey	2	2	0	174	99	+75	4
Isle of Man	2	1	1	152	146	+6	3
Frøya	2	0	2	110	191	−81	2

June 29, 2011
21:00

Frøya	58–105	Isle of Man

Cowes High School, Cowes

June 30, 2011
13:00

Jersey	86–52	Frøya

Cowes High School, Cowes

July 1, 2011
09:00

Isle of Man	47–88	Jersey

Cowes High School, Cowes

== Knockout stage ==
Quarter-finals
June 29
Saare County	102
Guernsey	60
June 29
Rhodes	118
Isle of Wight	48
June 29
Menorca	75
Gibraltar	84
June 29
Cayman Islands	63
Bermuda	66

Semi-finals
June 30
Saare County	105
Rhodes	101
June 30
Gibraltar	52
Bermuda	88

Final
July 1
Saare County	57
Bermuda	76
Third place
July 1
Rhodes	107
Gibraltar	60

5th place bracket

Semi-finals
June 30
Guernsey	87
Isle of Wight	79
June 30
Menorca	67
Cayman Islands	49

Fifth place
July 1
Guernsey	53
Menorca	81
Seventh place
July 1
Isle of Wight	39
Cayman Islands	79

=== Quarterfinals ===
June 29, 2011
13:30

Menorca	75–84	Gibraltar

Medina Leisure Centre, Newport

June 29, 2011
15:30

Saare County	102–60	Guernsey

Medina Leisure Centre, Newport

June 29, 2011
17:30

Rhodes	118–48	Isle of Wight

Medina Leisure Centre, Newport

June 29, 2011
21:30

Cayman Islands	63–66	Bermuda

Medina Leisure Centre, Newport

=== 5th–8th place semifinals ===
June 30, 2011
15:00

Guernsey	87–79	Isle of Wight

Cowes High School, Cowes

June 29, 2011
17:00

Menorca	67–49	Cayman Islands

Cowes High School, Cowes

=== Seventh place game ===
July 1, 2011
11:00

Isle of Wight	39–79	Cayman Islands

Cowes High School, Cowes

=== Fifth place game ===
July 1, 2011
13:00

Guernsey	53–81	Menorca

Cowes High School, Cowes

=== Semifinals ===
June 30, 2011
14:00

Saare County	105–101	Rhodes

Medina Leisure Centre, Newport

June 30, 2011
19:30

Gibraltar	52–88	Bermuda

Medina Leisure Centre, Newport

=== Bronze medal game ===
July 1, 2011
11:00

Rhodes	107–60	Gibraltar

Medina Leisure Centre, Newport

=== Gold medal game ===
July 1, 2011
15:00

Saare County	57–76	Bermuda

Medina Leisure Centre, Newport
