= 2004 Centrobasket =

2004 Central American and Caribbean basketball championship event

This page shows the results of the 2004 Men's Central American and Caribbean Basketball Championship, also known as the 2004 Centrobasket, which was held in the city of Santo Domingo, Dominican Republic from July 7 to July 11, 2004.

== Competing nations ==
| Group A | Group B |
|---|---|
| Barbados; Dominican Republic; Guatemala; Mexico | Antigua and Barbuda; Cuba; Panama; Puerto Rico |

== Preliminary round ==
| Group A | Pts | Pld | W | L | PF | PA | Diff |
|---|---|---|---|---|---|---|---|
| Dominican Republic | 6 | 3 | 3 | 0 | 227 | 194 | +33 |
| Mexico | 5 | 3 | 2 | 1 | 246 | 225 | +21 |
| Barbados | 4 | 3 | 1 | 2 | 234 | 247 | –13 |
| Guatemala | 3 | 3 | 0 | 3 | 214 | 255 | –41 |

- 2004-07-07

| Mexico | 94 – 83 | Barbados |
| Dominican Republic | 75 – 71 | Guatemala |

- 2004-07-08

| Mexico | 84 – 72 | Guatemala |
| Dominican Republic | 82 – 55 | Barbados |

- 2004-07-09

| Barbados | 96 – 71 | Guatemala |
| Dominican Republic | 70 – 68 | Mexico |

| Group B | Pts | Pld | W | L | PF | PA | Diff |
|---|---|---|---|---|---|---|---|
| Puerto Rico | 6 | 3 | 3 | 0 | 317 | 218 | +99 |
| Panama | 5 | 3 | 2 | 1 | 256 | 231 | +25 |
| Cuba | 4 | 3 | 1 | 2 | 251 | 225 | +26 |
| Antigua and Barbuda | 3 | 3 | 0 | 3 | 204 | 354 | –150 |

- 2004-07-07

| Panama | 72 – 62 | Cuba |
| Puerto Rico | 122 – 77 | Antigua and Barbuda |

- 2004-07-08

| Panama | 104 – 67 | Antigua and Barbuda |
| Puerto Rico | 93 – 61 | Cuba |

- 2004-07-09

| Cuba | 128 – 60 | Antigua and Barbuda |
| Panama | 80 – 102 | Puerto Rico |

== Consolidation round ==
- 2004-07-10 — 5th/8th place

| Antigua and Barbuda | 77 – 88 | Barbados |
| Cuba | 84 – 49 | Guatemala |

- 2003-06-20 — 1st/4th place

| Mexico | 80 – 89 | Puerto Rico |
| Dominican Republic | 81 – 77 | Panama |

== Final round ==
- 2004-07-11 — 7th/8th place

| Guatemala | 67 – 77 | Antigua and Barbuda |

- 2004-07-11 — 5th/6th place

| Barbados | 81 – 83 | Cuba |

- 2004-07-11 — 3rd/4th place

| Panama | 98 – 89 | Mexico |

- 2004-07-11 — 1st/2nd place

| Dominican Republic | 75 – 74 | Puerto Rico |

== Final ranking ==
1. Dominican Republic

2. Puerto Rico

3. Panama

4. Mexico

5. Cuba

6. Barbados

7. Antigua and Barbuda

8. Guatemala

2004 Men's Centrobasket winners

Dominican Republic
Second title

== Individual awards ==
- MVP: Jack Michael Martínez (DOM)
- Best Scorers: Elías Larry Ayuso (PUR) and Mario Davis (ATG)
- Best Rebounder: Jack Michael Martínez (DOM)
- Best Assist: Christian Dalmau (PUR)
- All-Star Team:
  - Point guard: Bobby Joe Hatton (PUR)
  - Shooting guard: Elías Larry Ayuso (PUR)
  - Small forward: Michael Hicks (PAN)
  - Power forward: Jack Michael Martínez (DOM)
  - Center: Sharif Fajardo (PUR)
