= 2009 FIBA Americas Championship qualification =

Qualifying for the 2009 FIBA Americas Championship the basketball championships for the Americas (North America, Central America, the Caribbean and South America) began on August 12, 2007 at the FIBA CBC Championship for national teams from the Caribbean. Three teams qualified from that tournament to the 2008 Centrobasket, from which four automatic berths are available.

South American teams qualified via the 2008 South American Basketball Championship, held at Puerto Montt, Chile. North American teams (Canada and the United States) automatically qualify to the championship, which will be held in San Juan, Puerto Rico. The top four teams from the 2009 Championships qualify automatically to the 2010 FIBA World Championship in Turkey, with FIBA handling out four more wild card entries to complete the 24-team tournament.

With the United States winning the gold medal at the 2008 men's Olympic basketball tournament, another slot was opened for a Centrobasket participant, when the United States decided to skip qualification since their gold medal provided them automatic qualification to the 2010 FIBA World Championship.

== 2007 CBC Championship ==
The 2007 CBC Championship was held from August 6 to 12, 2007, at Caguas, Puerto Rico. The top three teams at the end of the tournament qualify for the 2008 Centrobasket.

Qualified to the Final

=== Group A ===
Team	Pld	W	L	PF	PA	PD	Pts	Tie*	
Dominican Republic	3	3	0	286	208	+78	6		
Bahamas	3	1	2	229	256	−27	4	3	1.025
Guyana	3	1	2	233	258	−25	4	3	0.987
Antigua	3	1	2	210	236	−26	4	3	0.986

*Points between games of tied teams, then goal averages between the games of tied teams.

August 6

Bahamas	70–78	Antigua

Caguas, Puerto Rico

August 7

Dominican Republic	99–76	Guyana

Caguas, Puerto Rico

August 8

Bahamas	68–99	Dominican Republic

Caguas, Puerto Rico

August 9

Antigua	68–78	Guyana

Caguas, Puerto Rico

August 10

Bahamas	91–79	Guyana

Caguas, Puerto Rico

August 10

Antigua	64–88	Dominican Republic

Caguas, Puerto Rico

=== Group B ===
Team	Pld	W	L	PF	PA	PD	Pts
Puerto Rico	4	4	0	393	229	+164	8
Cuba	4	3	1	350	303	+47	7
British Virgin Islands	4	2	2	290	349	−59	6
Barbados	4	1	3	240	338	−98	5
Trinidad and Tobago	4	0	4	272	326	−54	4

August 6

Trinidad and Tobago	68–69	Barbados

Caguas, Puerto Rico

August 6

Puerto Rico	107–56	British Virgin Islands

Caguas, Puerto Rico

August 7

Cuba	93–69	Barbados

Caguas, Puerto Rico

August 7

Trinidad and Tobago	67–93	Puerto Rico

Caguas, Puerto Rico

August 8

British Virgin Islands	81–105	Cuba

Caguas, Puerto Rico

August 8

Puerto Rico	104–38	Barbados

Caguas, Puerto Rico

August 9

British Virgin Islands	73–64	Barbados

Caguas, Puerto Rico

August 9

Cuba	84–64	Trinidad and Tobago

Caguas, Puerto Rico

August 10

British Virgin Islands	80–73	Trinidad and Tobago

Caguas, Puerto Rico

August 10

Puerto Rico	89–68	Cuba

Caguas, Puerto Rico

=== Knockout stage ===
==== Championship bracket ====
Italicized teams advanced to the 2008 Centrobasket.

Semifinals
A1	Dominican Republic	93
B2	Cuba	82
B1	Puerto Rico	77
A2	Bahamas	64

Final
A1	Dominican Republic	72
B1	Puerto Rico	82
Third place
B2	Cuba (OT)	90
A2	Bahamas	88

==== Classification ====
Semifinals
A3	Guyana	66
B4	Barbados	70
B3	British Virgin Islands	64
A4	Antigua	76

Fifth-place
B4	Barbados	73
A4	Antigua	77
Third place
A3	Guyana	81
B3	British Virgin Islands	92

== 2008 Centrobasket ==
The 2008 Centrobasket was held from August 27 to 31, 2008, at Chetumal and Cancun, Mexico. The top four teams automatically go to the Tournament of the Americas. With the US not participating, the fifth-placed team also qualifies.

Italicized teams advanced to the FIBA Americas Championship 2009.

Qualified to the semifinals, and the Americas Championship

=== Group A ===
Team	Pld	W	L	PF	PA	PD	Pts	Tie*	
Virgin Islands	3	2	1	240	215	+25	5	3	1.034
Dominican Republic	3	2	1	258	194	+64	5	3	0.993
Mexico	3	2	1	237	185	+52	5	3	0.973
El Salvador	3	0	3	143	284	−141	3		

*Points between games of tied teams, then goal averages between the games of tied teams.

August 27

Mexico	92–36	El Salvador

Chetumal, Mexico

August 27

Virgin Islands	83–74	Dominican Republic

Chetumal, Mexico

August 28

Dominican Republic	106–41	El Salvador

Chetumal, Mexico

August 28

Virgin Islands	71–75	Mexico

Chetumal, Mexico

August 29

El Salvador	66–86	Virgin Islands

Chetumal, Mexico

August 29

Mexico	70–78	Dominican Republic

Chetumal, Mexico

=== Group B ===
Team	Pld	W	L	PF	PA	PD	Pts
Puerto Rico	3	3	0	295	260	+25	6
Cuba	3	2	1	285	265	+64	5
Panama	3	1	2	278	269	+52	4
Costa Rica	3	0	3	206	270	−141	3

=== Knockout stage ===
==== Championship bracket ====
Semifinals (Cancun)
A1	Virgin Islands	78
B2	Cuba	61
B1	Puerto Rico	76
A2	Dominican Republic	74

Final (Cancun)
A1	Virgin Islands	70
B1	Puerto Rico	87
Third place
B2	Cuba	74
A2	Dominican Republic	102

==== Classification ====
Semifinals (Chetumal)
A3	Mexico	90
B4	Costa Rica	73
B3	Panama	100
A4	El Salvador	59

Fifth-place (Chetumal)
A3	Mexico	104
B3	Panama	67
Third place
B4	Costa Rica	76
A4	El Salvador	79

== 2008 South American Basketball Championship ==
The 2008 South American Basketball Championship was held from July 1 to 6, at Puerto Montt, Chile. The top four teams qualify to the Tournament of the Americas.

Qualified to the Final
Qualified to the 3rd-place game
Top 4 qualifies to the Americas Championship.

=== Preliminary round ===
Italicized teams advanced to the FIBA Americas Championship 2009.

Team	Pld	W	L	PF	PA	PD	Pts	Tie*	
Argentina	5	4	1	465	392	+73	9	3	1.147
Uruguay	5	4	1	436	393	+43	9	3	1.000
Brazil	5	4	1	401	407	−6	9	3	0.860
Venezuela	5	2	3	407	412	−5	7		
Colombia	5	1	4	374	425	−51	6		
Chile	5	0	5	349	403	−54	5		

*Points between games of tied teams, then goal averages between the games of tied teams.

July 1

Brazil	83–75	Colombia

Puerto Montt, Chile

July 1

Argentina	79–77	Venezuela

Puerto Montt, Chile

July 1

Chile	66–81	Uruguay

Puerto Montt, Chile

July 2

Argentina	104–75	Colombia

Puerto Montt, Chile

July 2

Brazil	70–69	Chile

Puerto Montt, Chile

July 2

Venezuela	70–88	Uruguay

Puerto Montt, Chile

July 3

Uruguay	88–78	Colombia

Puerto Montt, Chile

July 3

Brazil	68–102	Argentina

Puerto Montt, Chile

July 3

Chile	76–94	Venezuela

Puerto Montt, Chile

July 4

Uruguay	102–93	Argentina

Puerto Montt, Chile

July 4

Brazil	94–84	Venezuela

Puerto Montt, Chile

July 4

Chile	68–71	Colombia

Puerto Montt, Chile

July 5

Colombia	75–82	Venezuela

Puerto Montt, Chile

July 5

Chile	70–87	Argentina

Puerto Montt, Chile

July 5

Brazil	86–77	Uruguay

Puerto Montt, Chile

=== Finals ===
July 6

Third

Brazil	72–87	Venezuela

Puerto Montt, Chile

July 6

Final

Argentina	100–95	Uruguay

Puerto Montt, Chile

== Did not enter ==
- Cayman Islands
- Turks and Caicos Islands
- Haiti
- Jamaica
- Saint Kitts and Nevis
- Montserrat
- Dominica
- Saint Lucia
- Saint Vincent and the Grenadines
- Grenada
- Aruba
- Bermuda
- Netherlands Antilles
- Suriname
- Guatemala
- Belize
- Nicaragua
- Honduras
- Paraguay
- Peru
- Ecuador
- Bolivia
