= Kadeem Coleby =

Bahamian basketball player

Personal information
- Born: November 8, 1989 (age 37) Nassau, Bahamas
- Listed height: 6 ft 9 in (2.06 m)
- Listed weight: 251 lb (114 kg)

Career information
- High school: Christian Life Center Academy (Humble, Texas)
- College: Odessa College (2009–2010); Daytona State (2010–2011); Louisiana (2011–2012); Wichita State (2013–2014)
- NBA draft: 2014: undrafted
- Playing career: 2014–2023
- Position: Power forward / center

Career history
- 2014: Al-Fateh
- 2014–2015: Al Manama
- 2015–2016: Al Muharraq
- 2016–2017: Al Manama
- 2017–2022: Akita Northern Happinets

Career highlights
- B1 Block leader (2019); B2 Block leader (2018); Bahraini champion (2017); Bahrain Basketball League MVP (2016)
Medals
Men's basketball
Representing Bahamas
FIBA CBC Championship
| Gold medal – first place | 2014 Tortola | Bahamas |

Kadeem D'Arby Coleby (born November 8, 1989), nicknamed KC, is a Bahamian professional basketball player who last played for the Akita Northern Happinets of the B.League in Japan. He is one of the league-leading skilled shot blockers. He fractured both kneecaps during the game on February 10, 2021.

== College statistics ==
| Year | Team | GP | GS | MPG | FG% | 3P% | FT% | RPG | APG | SPG | BPG | PPG |
|---|---|---|---|---|---|---|---|---|---|---|---|---|
| 2009–10 | Odessa | 30 | | | .330 | | .380 | 2.667 | 0.233 | 0.200 | 0.433 | 1.67 |
| 2010–11 | Daytona State | 32 | | | .530 | | .510 | 8.063 | 0.750 | 0.406 | 2.406 | 10.19 |
| 2011-12 | Louisiana–Lafayette | 31 | 30 | 24.4 | .561 | .000 | .500 | 4.9 | 0.8 | 0.4 | 2.4 | 9.5 |
| 2013-14 | Wichita State | 36 | 19 | 12.9 | .452 | .000 | .500 | 1.3 | 0.2 | 0.1 | 1.3 | 2.6 |

=== Playoffs ===
| Year | Team | GP | GS | MPG | FG% | 3P% | FT% | RPG | APG | SPG | BPG | PPG |
|---|---|---|---|---|---|---|---|---|---|---|---|---|
| 2013–14 | Wichita | 2 | | 13.0 | .400 | .000 | .167 | 1.5 | 0 | 0 | 2.0 | 2.5 |

== Career statistics ==
Legend
| GP | Games played | GS | Games started | MPG | Minutes per game |
| FG% | Field goal percentage | 3P% | 3-point field goal percentage | FT% | Free throw percentage |
| RPG | Rebounds per game | APG | Assists per game | SPG | Steals per game |
| BPG | Blocks per game | PPG | Points per game | **Bold** | Career high |

| † | Denotes seasons in which Coleby won an championship |
| * | Led the league |

=== Regular season ===
| Year | Team | GP | GS | MPG | FG% | 3P% | FT% | RPG | APG | SPG | BPG | PPG |
|---|---|---|---|---|---|---|---|---|---|---|---|---|
| 2017† | Manama | 6 | | 26.8 | 68 | 0 | 73.5 | 8.8 | 1.3 | 1.0 | 1.83 | 15.5 |
| 2017-18 | Akita | 51 | 31 | 21.7 | 58.1 | 0 | 61.2 | 6.7 | 1.0 | 1.0 | 1.7* | 11.9 |
| 2018-19 | Akita | 52 | 52 | 30.5 | 53.9 | 0 | 57.4 | 8.4 | 1.4 | 1.1 | 2.3* | 12.8 |
| 2019-20 | Akita | 34 | 34 | 27.2 | 54.1 | 0 | 65.0 | 6.9 | 1.2 | 0.8 | 1.9 | 10.1 |
| 2020-21 | Akita | 35 | 35 | 26.5 | 64.6 | 0 | 60.5 | 7.9 | 2.4 | 1.1 | 1.6 | 12.3 |

=== Playoffs ===
| Year | Team | GP | GS | MPG | FG% | 3P% | FT% | RPG | APG | SPG | BPG | PPG |
|---|---|---|---|---|---|---|---|---|---|---|---|---|
| 2017-18 | Akita | 5 | 3 | 19:54 | .600 | .000 | .800 | 3.2 | 0.2 | 1.2 | 1.4 | 9.6 |

=== Early cup games ===
| Year | Team | GP | GS | MPG | FG% | 3P% | FT% | RPG | APG | SPG | BPG | PPG |
|---|---|---|---|---|---|---|---|---|---|---|---|---|
| 2017 | Akita | 2 | 1 | 20:15 | .636 | .000 | .556 | 6.0 | 0.5 | 3.0 | 2.0 | 9.5 |
| 2018 | Akita | 2 | 1 | 25:48 | .474 | .000 | .600 | 9.5 | 0.0 | 1.0 | 2.0 | 10.5 |
| 2019 | Akita | 2 | 2 | 24:31 | .471 | .000 | .143 | 9.0 | 3.5 | 0.5 | 1.0 | 8.5 |

=== Preseason games ===
| Year | Team | GP | GS | MPG | FG% | 3P% | FT% | RPG | APG | SPG | BPG | PPG |
|---|---|---|---|---|---|---|---|---|---|---|---|---|
| 2018 | Akita | 2 | 1 | 20.8 | .500 | .000 | .688 | 4.0 | 1.5 | 0.5 | 0.5 | 9.5 |
| 2019 | Akita | 3 | 2 | 20.2 | .739 | .000 | .429 | 4.3 | 2.7 | 0.3 | 2.0 | 12.33 |

Source: Changwon1Changwon2 Source: UtsunomiyaToyamaSendai

=== National team ===
| Year | Team | GP | GS | MPG | FG% | 3P% | FT% | RPG | APG | SPG | BPG | PPG |
|---|---|---|---|---|---|---|---|---|---|---|---|---|
| 2012 | Bahamas | 4 | | 14.75 | 68.8 | 0 | 50 | 2.8 | 0 | 0 | 2.8 | 6.5 |
| 2014 | Bahamas | 5 | | 25 | 48.9 | 0 | 66.7 | 4.2 | 0.8 | 0.8 | 1.2 | 10.8 |
| 2015 | Bahamas | 5 | | 20.2 | 41.7 | 0 | 65 | 5.2 | 0.4 | 0 | 3.4 | 8.6 |
| 2018 | Bahamas | 2 | | 21 | 45.5 | 0 | 85.7 | 3.5 | 1.0 | 0.5 | 2 | 8.0 |

== Personal ==
His younger brother, Dwight Coleby (tl) played college basketball for the University of Kansas and Western Kentucky. DC signed with the Liège Basket in Belgium, and was transferred to the Happinets. This KC/DC brother unit became successful in a 76–52 win to the Levanga Hokkaido on March 13, 2019. Their mother died at the age of 43, and KC wears #43. KC tied knot to Krystal Coleby on July 14, 2018.
