= 2014 CBC Championship =

The 2014 FIBC CBC Championship in the British Virgin Islands serves as the qualifier for the 2014 Centrobasket for Caribbean national teams. The top three advance to the Centrobasket.

== Preliminary round ==
=== Group A ===
Pos	Team	Pld	W	L	PF	PA	PD	Pts	Qualification
1	Bahamas	3	2	1	229	214	+15	5	Qualification to final round
2	Cuba	3	2	1	239	191	+48	5	Qualification to final round
3	Saint Vincent and the Grenadines	3	1	2	204	262	−58	4	Qualification to classification round
4	Antigua and Barbuda	3	1	2	238	243	−5	4	Qualification to classification round

Source: FIBA archive

1 July 2014

Saint Vincent and the Grenadines	53–84	Bahamas

Tortola Multi Purpose Sports Complex, Road Town

1 July 2014

Cuba	82–56	Antigua and Barbuda

Tortola Multi Purpose Sports Complex, Road Town

2 July 2014

Cuba	86–56	Saint Vincent and the Grenadines

Tortola Multi Purpose Sports Complex, Road Town

2 July 2014

Bahamas	68–90	Antigua and Barbuda

Tortola Multi Purpose Sports Complex, Road Town

3 July 2014

Saint Vincent and the Grenadines	93–92	Antigua and Barbuda

Tortola Multi Purpose Sports Complex, Road Town

3 July 2014

Cuba	71–77	Bahamas

Tortola Multi Purpose Sports Complex, Road Town

=== Group B ===
Pos	Team	Pld	W	L	PF	PA	PD	Pts	Qualification
1	Virgin Islands	3	3	0	250	188	+62	6	Qualification to final round
2	British Virgin Islands	3	2	1	240	229	+11	5	Qualification to final round
3	Barbados	3	1	2	210	216	−6	4	Qualification to classification round
4	Guyana	3	0	3	207	274	−67	3	Qualification to classification round

Source: FIBA archive

1 July 2014

Barbados	53–66	Virgin Islands

Tortola Multi Purpose Sports Complex, Road Town

1 July 2014

British Virgin Islands	99–63	Guyana

Tortola Multi Purpose Sports Complex, Road Town

2 July 2014

Virgin Islands	95–75	Guyana

Tortola Multi Purpose Sports Complex, Road Town

2 July 2014

British Virgin Islands	81–77	Barbados

Tortola Multi Purpose Sports Complex, Road Town

3 July 2014

Barbados	80–69	Guyana

Tortola Multi Purpose Sports Complex, Road Town

3 July 2014

Virgin Islands	89–60	British Virgin Islands

Tortola Multi Purpose Sports Complex, Road Town

=== Classification round ===
Semifinals
4 July 2014
Saint Vincent and the Grenadines	72
Guyana	86
4 July 2014
Barbados	83
Antigua and Barbuda	72

5th place
5 July 2014
Barbados	58
Guyana	79
7th place
5 July 2014
Saint Vincent and the Grenadines	81
Antigua and Barbuda	109

=== Final round ===
Semifinals
4 July 2014
Bahamas	84
British Virgin Islands	65
4 July 2014
Virgin Islands	60
Cuba	62

Final
5 July 2014
Bahamas	75
Cuba	64
Third place
5 July 2014
British Virgin Islands	68
Virgin Islands	102

=== Final ranking ===
These were the final rankings. The top 3 teams qualify for the 2014 Centrobasket.

Qualifies to the 2014 Centrobasket

Rank	Team
1st place, gold medalist(s)	Bahamas
2nd place, silver medalist(s)	Cuba
3rd place, bronze medalist(s)	Virgin Islands
4	British Virgin Islands
5	Guyana
6	Barbados
7	Antigua and Barbuda
8	Saint Vincent and the Grenadines
