= 2003 Centrobasket =

This page shows the results of the Men's Central American and Caribbean Basketball Championship, also known as the 2003 Centrobasket, which was held in the city of Culiacán, Mexico from June 17 to June 22, 2003.

== Competing nations ==
| Group A | Group B |
|---|---|
| Antigua and Barbuda; Costa Rica; Mexico; Virgin Islands | Bahamas; Dominican Republic; Guatemala; Puerto Rico |

== Preliminary round ==
| Group A | Pts | Pld | W | L | PF | PA | Diff |
|---|---|---|---|---|---|---|---|
| Mexico | 6 | 3 | 3 | 0 | 288 | 242 | +46 |
| Virgin Islands | 5 | 3 | 2 | 1 | 280 | 224 | +56 |
| Costa Rica | 4 | 3 | 1 | 2 | 234 | 274 | –40 |
| Antigua and Barbuda | 3 | 3 | 0 | 3 | 224 | 286 | –62 |

- 2003-06-17

| Virgin Islands | 98 – 66 | Costa Rica |
| Mexico | 104 – 74 | Antigua and Barbuda |

- 2003-06-18

| Costa Rica | 91 – 84 | Antigua and Barbuda |
| Mexico | 92 – 91 | Virgin Islands |

- 2003-06-19

| Mexico | 92 – 77 | Costa Rica |
| Virgin Islands | 91 – 66 | Antigua and Barbuda |

| Group B | Pts | Pld | W | L | PF | PA | Diff |
|---|---|---|---|---|---|---|---|
| Puerto Rico | 6 | 3 | 3 | 0 | 307 | 187 | +120 |
| Dominican Republic | 5 | 3 | 2 | 1 | 226 | 246 | –20 |
| Bahamas | 4 | 3 | 1 | 2 | 260 | 255 | +5 |
| Guatemala | 3 | 3 | 0 | 3 | 185 | 290 | –105 |

- 2003-06-17

| Dominican Republic | 81 – 67 | Guatemala |
| Puerto Rico | 109 – 70 | Bahamas |

- 2003-06-18

| Bahamas | 83 – 85 | Dominican Republic |
| Guatemala | 57 – 102 | Puerto Rico |

- 2003-06-19

| Bahamas | 107 – 61 | Guatemala |
| Dominican Republic | 60 – 96 | Puerto Rico |

== Second round ==
- 2003-06-20 — 5th/8th place

| Costa Rica | 65 – 70 | Guatemala |
| Bahamas | 95 – 71 | Antigua and Barbuda |

- 2003-06-20 — 1st/4th place

| Mexico | 93 – 94 | Dominican Republic |
| Puerto Rico | 87 – 86 | Virgin Islands |

== Final round ==
- 2003-06-21 — 7th/8th place

| Costa Rica | 86 – 99 | Antigua and Barbuda |

- 2003-06-21 — 5th/6th place

| Guatemala | 60 – 81 | Bahamas |

- 2003-06-21 — 3rd/4th place

| Mexico | 78 – 76 | Virgin Islands |

- 2003-06-21 — 1st/2nd place

| Dominican Republic | 83 – 93 | Puerto Rico |

== Final ranking ==
1. Puerto Rico

2. Dominican Republic

3. Mexico

4. Virgin Islands

5. Bahamas

6. Guatemala

7. Antigua and Barbuda

8. Costa Rica

2003 Men's Centrobasket winners

Puerto Rico
Eighth title
