= Basketball at the 2023 Island Games =

- Venue: St Sampsons High School, Guernsey
- Dates: 9–14 July
- Nations: 10

Basketball, in the 2023 Island Games, held at St Sampsons High School, Guernsey in July 2023.

== Medal table ==
* Host nation (Guernsey)

Rank	Nation	Gold	Silver	Bronze	Total
1	Menorca	1	1	0	2
2	Saaremaa	1	0	0	1
3	Cayman Islands	0	1	1	2
4	Guernsey*	0	0	1	1
Totals (4 entries)		2	2	2	6

== Participating islands ==
- Cayman Islands
- Falkland Islands
- Faroe Islands
- Guernsey (Host)
- Isle of Man
- Isle of Wight
- Jersey
- Menorca
- Saaremaa
- (Anglesey) Ynys Môn

== Medalists ==
Event	Gold	Silver	Bronze
Men	Saaremaa; Taavi Ilmjärv; Indrek Kajupank; Mihkel Kõbin; Enrico Laanemäe; Mario Paiste; Ats Pildre; Siim Pildre; Allar Raamat; Mairo Rumm; Taavi Tõnus	Menorca; Eloi Barrasa Marquet; Pau Cardona de la Camara; Julen Coll Estévez; Izan Fernández Pulido; Lorenzo Frau Pons; Marc Gornés Pons; Yago Homs Laucirica; Sebastian Pons Pons; Roger Rosselló Román; Damià Soriano Villalonga	Cayman Islands; Justin Collins; Davion Cotterell; Juawon Ebanks; Bryan Ebanks-Perez; Nii Akwei General-Vanderpuije; Justin Golob; Samuel O'Garro; Shaad O'Garro; Daniel Quinland; De'Andre Simpson; Philip Webb; Jake Whittaker
Women	Menorca; Claudia Ametller Moll; Paula Carreras Saura; Andrea Fernandez Pulido; Maria Magdalena Garau Castell; Claudia Pons Pons; Gemma Prieto Vinent; Julia Charlotte Sosa Berndt; Marta Tuduri Mercadal	Cayman Islands; Vania Cornwall; Courtisha Ebanks; Neandra Forbes-Morgan; Victoria Gray; Annika Moore; Khailan O'Connor; Hannah Parchment; Chloe Powery-Doxey; Jamie Rankin-Maize; Charlene Seymour; Zandie Smith; Lyandrea Watson	Guernsey; Ieva Babina; Tia Barnett; Emilie Batiste; Gemma Batiste; Kerri Brown; Katie Cochrane; Samanta Cox; Emma Hicks; Bonita Le Noury; Rochelle Mullen; Emma Sykes; Emma Webb
