= Looby =

Looby is a surname. Notable people with the surname include:

- Anne Looby, Australian actress, producer, and stage director
- Keith Looby, Australian artist
- Kurt Looby, Antiguan basketball player
- Z. Alexander Looby (1899–1972), American lawyer, politician, and civil rights leader
