= Leslee Smith =

British Virgin Islands basketball player

No. 21 – Bristol Flyers
- Position: Forward
- League: BBL

Personal information
- Born: 17 July 1990 (age 36) Tortola, British Virgin Islands
- Listed height: 6 ft 8 in (2.03 m)
- Listed weight: 244.2 lb (111 kg)

Career information
- College: SMU (2010–12); Seward County CC (2012–13); Nebraska (2013–2015)
- Playing career: 2014–present

Career history
- 2015: La Salle Tarija
- 2015–2016: Olimpi Tbilisi
- 2016–2018: Bristol Flyers
- 2018: Iserlohn Kangaroos
- 2018–2019: Sheffield Sharks
- 2019–2020: Plymouth Raiders
- 2022–present: Bristol Flyers

Leslee Jishawn Smith (born 17 July 1990) is a British Virgin Islands professional basketball player for the Bristol Flyers in the British Basketball League (BBL).

He represented the British Virgin Islands national basketball team at the 2015 FIBA CBC Championship in Road Town, British Virgin Islands.

Smith began his professional career in 2015 with La Salle Tarija of Bolivia, competing in the Liga Sudamericana.
