= 1995 Tournament of the Americas =

Tournament details
- Host country: Argentina
- Dates: 15–27 August
- Teams: 10
- Venues: 2 (in 2 host cities)

Final positions
- Champions: Puerto Rico (4th title)
- Runners-up: Argentina
- Third place: Brazil
- Fourth place: Canada

Tournament statistics
- Top scorer: (Brazil) Oscar Schmidt

The 1995 Tournament of the Americas, later known as the FIBA Americas Championship and the FIBA AmeriCup, was a basketball championship hosted by Argentina, from August 15 to August 27, 1995. The games were played in Tucuman and Neuquén. This FIBA AmeriCup was to earn the three berths allocated to the Americas for the 1996 Summer Olympics, in Atlanta. The United States did not participate in the tournament, as the team claimed the host berth in the Olympics. Puerto Rico defeated Argentina in the final, to win the tournament. Brazil beat Canada in the third place game, to claim the final Olympic berth.

== Qualification ==
Eight teams qualified during the qualification tournaments held in their respective zones in 1995; Canada qualified automatically since they are one of the two members of the North America zone.

- North America: Canada
- Caribbean and Central America:Bahamas, Barbados, Cuba, Dominican Republic, Puerto Rico
- South America: Argentina, Brazil, Uruguay, Venezuela

The draw split the tournament into two groups:

Group A

Barbados
Canada
Cuba
Dominican Republic
Puerto Rico

Group B

Argentina
Bahamas
Brazil
Uruguay
Venezuela

== Format ==
- The top four teams from each group advance to the quarterfinals.
- Results and standings among teams within the same group are carried over.
- The top four teams at the quarterfinals advanced to the semifinals.
- The winners in the knockout semifinals advanced to the Final and were granted berths in the 1996 Summer Olympics tournament in Atlanta. The losers figure in a third-place playoff where the winner was given the third and final place in the Olympics.

== Preliminary round ==
Qualified for the quarterfinals

=== Group A ===
Team	Pld	W	L	PF	PA	PD	Pts
Puerto Rico	4	4	0	361	326	+35	8
Canada	4	2	2	337	312	+25	6
Cuba	4	2	2	369	336	+33	6
Dominican Republic	4	2	2	329	326	+3	6
Barbados	4	0	4	271	367	−96	4

15 August

Report

Puerto Rico	105–95	Cuba
Scoring by half: 53–43, 52–52

Neuquén

15 August

Report

Dominican Republic	82–79	Canada
Scoring by half: 53–34, 29–45

Neuquén

16 August

Report

Dominican Republic	86–66	Barbados
Scoring by half: 48–36, 38–30

Neuquén

16 August

Report

Puerto Rico	84–73	Canada
Scoring by half: 42–37, 42–36

Neuquén

17 August

Report

Barbados	55–96	Cuba
Scoring by half: 27–50, 28–46

Neuquén

17 August

Report

Puerto Rico	82–75	Dominican Republic
Scoring by half: 46–42, 36–33

Neuquén

18 August

Report

Canada	90–79	Cuba
Scoring by half: 45–43, 45–36

Neuquén

18 August

Report

Puerto Rico	90–83	Barbados
Scoring by half: 43–39, 47–44

Neuquén

19 August

Report

Cuba	99–86	Dominican Republic
Scoring by half: 51–42, 48–44

Neuquén

19 August

Report

Canada	95–67	Barbados
Scoring by half: 58–34, 37–33

Neuquén

=== Group B ===
Team	Pld	W	L	PF	PA	PD	Pts
Brazil	4	3	1	354	320	+34	7
Uruguay	4	3	1	343	313	+30	7
Argentina	4	3	1	326	290	+36	7
Bahamas	4	1	3	317	372	−55	5
Venezuela	4	0	4	312	357	−45	4

15 August

Report

Venezuela	66–83	Argentina
Scoring by half: 38–41, 28–42

Tucumán

15 August

Report

Brazil	81–84	Uruguay
Scoring by half: 40–55, 41–29

Tucumán

16 August

Report

Brazil	91–78	Bahamas
Scoring by half: 45–35, 46–43

Tucumán

16 August

Report

Uruguay	75–79	Argentina
Scoring by half: 36–36, 39–43

Tucumán

17 August

Report

Uruguay	104–78	Bahamas
Scoring by half: 49–46, 55–32

Tucumán

17 August

Report

Venezuela	80–99	Brazil
Scoring by half: 34–45, 46–54

Tucumán

18 August

Report

Uruguay	80–75	Venezuela
Scoring by half: 45–41, 35–34

Tucumán

18 August

Report

Bahamas	66–86	Argentina
Scoring by half: 43–45, 23–41

Tucumán

19 August

Report

Venezuela	91–95	Bahamas
Scoring by half: 51–48, 40–47

Tucumán

19 August

Report

Argentina	78–83	Brazil
Scoring by half: 39–39, 39–44

Tucumán

== Quarterfinal group ==
Qualified for the semifinals

The top four teams in both Group A and Group B advanced to the quarterfinal group. Then each team played the four from the other group once to complete a full round robin with the top four advancing to the semifinals. Records from the preliminary groups carried over.

Team	Pld	W	L	PF	PA	PD	Pts
Argentina	7	6	1	633	545	+88	13
Puerto Rico	7	6	1	658	609	+49	13
Canada	7	4	3	665	608	+57	11
Brazil	7	3	4	645	628	+17	10
Cuba	7	3	4	657	654	+3	10
Uruguay	7	3	4	596	611	−15	10
Dominican Republic	7	2	5	586	664	−78	9
Bahamas	7	1	6	615	736	−121	8

21 August

Report

Canada	94–73	Uruguay
Scoring by half: 42–32, 51–41

Neuquén

21 August

Report

Dominican Republic	100–98	Brazil
Scoring by half: 53–56, 47–42

Neuquén

21 August

Report

Cuba	81–86	Argentina
Scoring by half: 42–36, 39–50

Neuquén

21 August

Report

Puerto Rico	139–95	Bahamas
Scoring by half: 72–46, 67–49

Neuquén

22 August

Report

Bahamas	89–130	Canada
Scoring by half: 46–54, 43–76

Neuquén

22 August

Report

Brazil	110–95	Cuba
Scoring by half: 54–49, 56–46

Neuquén

22 August

Report

Dominican Republic	75–97	Argentina
Scoring by half: 36–44, 39–53

Neuquén

22 August

Report

Uruguay	83–89	Puerto Rico
Scoring by half: 37–43, 46–46

Neuquén

23 August

Report

Cuba	99–88	Bahamas
Scoring by half: 54–50, 45–38

Neuquén

23 August

Report

Dominican Republic	81–88	Uruguay
Scoring by half: 37–52, 44–36

Neuquén

23 August

Report

Puerto Rico	75–105	Argentina
Scoring by half: 31–55, 39–50

Neuquén

23 August

Report

Canada	104–99	Brazil
Scoring by half: 50–48, 54–51

Neuquén

24 August

Report

Bahamas	121–87	Dominican Republic
Scoring by half: 65–43, 56–44

Neuquén

24 August

Report

Uruguay	89–109	Cuba
Scoring by half: 41–50, 48–59

Neuquén

24 August

Report

Argentina	102–95	Canada
Scoring by half: 48–52, 54–43

Neuquén

24 August

Report

Brazil	83–89	Puerto Rico
Scoring by half: 40–45, 43–44

Neuquén

== Knockout stage ==
Semi-finals
26 August
Puerto Rico	98
Canada	81
26 August
Argentina	87
Brazil	82

Final
27 August
Puerto Rico	87
Argentina	86
Third place
27 August
Canada	79
Brazil	97

=== Semifinals ===
26 August

Report

Puerto Rico	98–81	Canada
Scoring by half: 56–39, 42–42

Neuquén

26 August

Report

Argentina	87–82	Brazil
Scoring by half: 42–41, 45–41

Neuquén

=== Third place game ===
27 August

Report

Brazil	97–79	Canada
Scoring by half: 44–32, 53–47

Neuquén

=== Final ===
27 August

Report

Argentina	86–87	Puerto Rico
Scoring by half: 50–47, 36–40

Neuquén

== Awards ==
=== Topscorer ===
Oscar Schmidt was the topscorer with 275 pts (27.5 per game).

1995 Tournament of the Americas winners

Puerto Rico
Fourth title

== Final standings ==
Qualified for the 1996 Olympic Tournament

Rank	Team	Record
1st place, gold medalist(s)	Puerto Rico	9–1
2nd place, silver medalist(s)	Argentina	8–2
3rd place, bronze medalist(s)	Brazil	5–5
4	Canada	5–5
5	Cuba	4–4
6	Uruguay	4–4
7	Dominican Republic	3–5
8	Bahamas	2–6
9	Venezuela	0–4
10	Barbados	0–4
