= British Virgin Islands men's national basketball team =

British Virgin Islands
- FIBA ranking: NR (3 March 2026)
- Joined FIBA: 1979
- FIBA zone: FIBA Americas
- National federation: British Virgin Islands Amateur Basketball Federation
- Coach: Keith Malone

FIBA AmeriCup
- Appearances: None

Centrobasket
- Appearances: 1 (2010)

Caribbean Championship
- Appearances: 6
- Medals: Silver: 2009
Home	Away

The British Virgin Islands national basketball team represents the British Virgin Islands (BVI) in international basketball competitions. It is administered by the British Virgin Islands Amateur Basketball Federation.

Despite their very small population size, the BVI are one of the top contenders at the Caribbean Basketball Championship as they finished in the top four at the last four competitions. Their best result was runner-up at the 2009 edition.

== Competitions ==
=== FIBA AmeriCup ===
yet to qualify

=== Centrobasket ===
- 2010 : 8th

=== Caribbean Championship ===
- 1985 : ?
- 1986 : ?
- 1987 : ?
- 1988 : ?
- 1990 : ?
- 1991 : ?
- 1993 : ?
- 1994 : ?
- 1995 : ?
- 1996 : ?
- 1998 : -
- 2000 : -
- 2002 : 7th
- 2004 : -
- 2006 : -
- 2007 : 7th
- 2009 : (silver)
- 2011 : 4th
- 2014 : 4th
- 2015 : 4th

=== Commonwealth Games ===
never participated

== Roster ==
Team for the 2015 FIBA CBC Championship.

British Virgin Islands men's national basketball team roster
Players
Coaches

Pos.	No.	Name	Age – Date of birth	Height	Club
G	4	Killven Samuel	25 – 7 July 1989	1.88 m (6 ft 2 in)	Northeastern State RiverHawks	(United States)
F	5	Steve Parillon	36 – 7 October 1978	1.96 m (6 ft 5 in)	Mega Mix (British Virgin Islands)	(British Virgin Islands)
G	6	Franklyn Penn	21 – 26 October 1993	1.85 m (6 ft 1 in)
F	7	Norville Carey	21 – 3 August 1993	2.01 m (6 ft 7 in)	Southern Miss Golden Eagles basketball	(United States)
F	8	Kennedy Bass	34 – 6 April 1981	1.96 m (6 ft 5 in)	Young Legs (British Virgin Islands)	(British Virgin Islands)
G	9	Halstead Chiverton	33 – 14 May 1982	1.93 m (6 ft 4 in)	Warner University Royals	(United States)
G	10	Dione Blyden	22 – 5 October 1992	1.85 m (6 ft 1 in)	Clinton Community College (Iowa)	(United States)
C	11	Kleon Penn	28 – 1 September 1986	2.13 m (7 ft 0 in)	free agent
G	12	Bjorn Caleb	23 – 4 October 1991	1.82 m (6 ft 0 in)
F	13	Randy George	34 – 10 January 1981	2.02 m (6 ft 8 in)	La Charite	(France)
F	14	Leslie Smith	24 – 17 July 1990	2.03 m (6 ft 8 in)	Bristol Flyers	(England)
G	15	Eustace Freeman	34 – 27 December 1980	1.71 m (5 ft 7 in)	Bad Boys (British Virgin Islands)	(British Virgin Islands)

Head coach

- (British Virgin Islands) Keith Malone

Assistant coach(es)

- (British Virgin Islands) Trevor Stevens

Legend

- Club – describes last
  club before the tournament

Roster
National Team at LatinBasket.com

== See also ==
- British Virgin Islands women's national basketball team
- British Virgin Islands national under-19 basketball team
- British Virgin Islands national under-17 basketball team
- British Virgin Islands national 3x3 team
