= Basketball at the 2006 Commonwealth Games =

Commonwealth Games Basketball Tournament
- Melbourne, Victoria 2006

Tournament details
- Games: 2006 Commonwealth Games
- Host nation: Australia
- City: Melbourne, Victoria
- Duration: 16–24 March 2006

Men's tournament
- Teams: 8
Medals
Gold medalists	Australia
Silver medalists	New Zealand
Bronze medalists	England

Women's tournament
- Teams: 8
Medals
Gold medalists	Australia
Silver medalists	New Zealand
Bronze medalists	England

Tournaments
	2018 →

Basketball at the 2006 Commonwealth Games was the inaugural appearance of Basketball at the Commonwealth Games. Competition was held in Melbourne, Australia, from 15 to 26 March 2006.

The 2006 Games was the first Commonwealth Games at which the sport of basketball was played. It was one of the sports that took the Games to regional Victoria, with games being played in a number of regional centres including Traralgon, Bendigo, Ballarat, and Geelong. The finals were played in Melbourne at Melbourne Multi Purpose Venue.

Australia topped the basketball medal table by virtue of winning both gold medals.

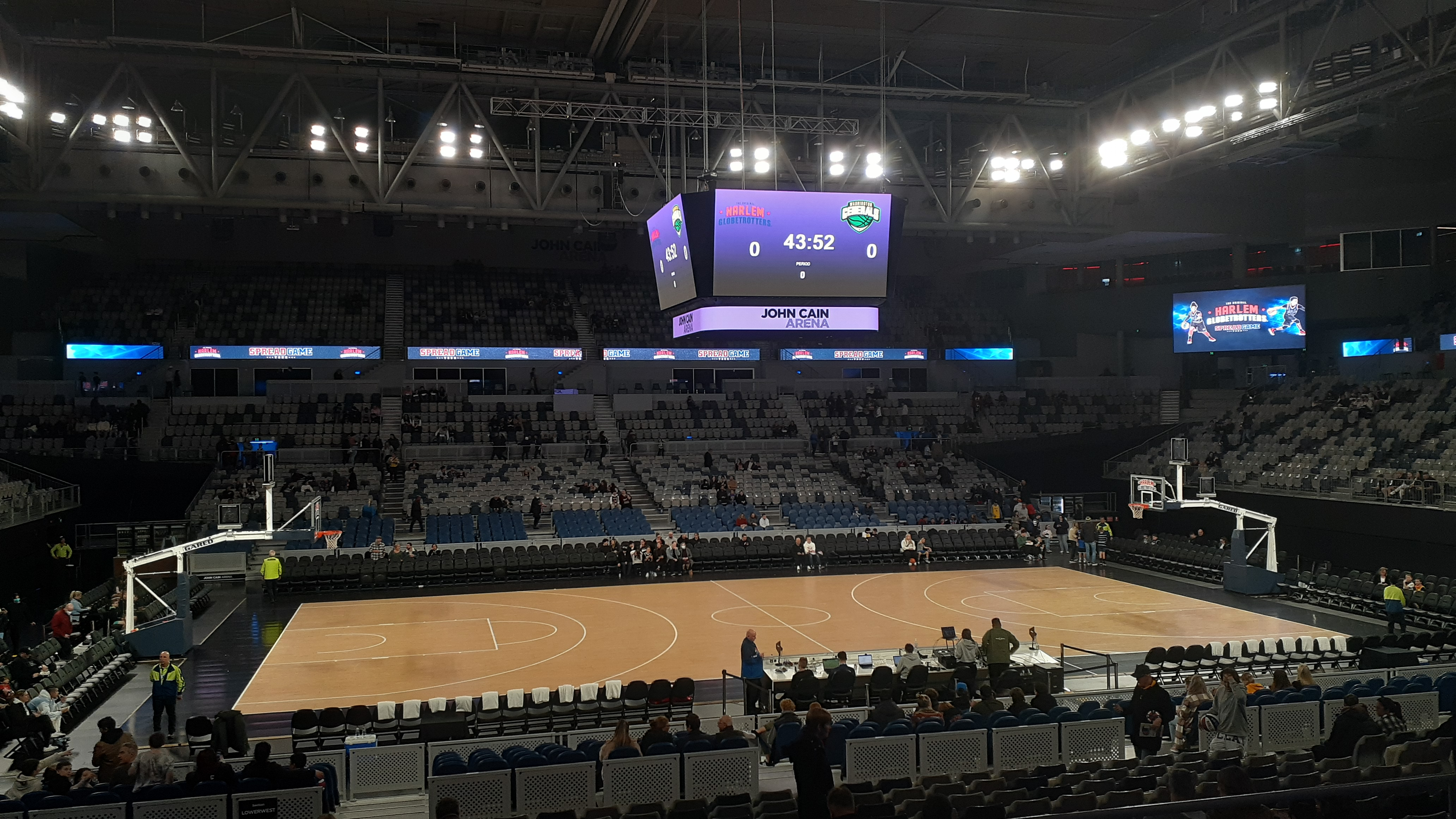
The Melbourne Multi Purpose Venue hosted the men's and women's basketball finals

== Venues ==
City	Stadium	Capacity
Melbourne	Melbourne Multi Purpose Venue	10,500
Ballarat	Ballarat Minerdome	2,000
Bendigo	Bendigo Stadium	2,000
Geelong	Geelong Arena	2,000
Traralgon	Traralgon Sports Stadium	2,000

== Medal summary ==
=== Medal table ===
* Host nation (Australia)

Rank	Nation	Gold	Silver	Bronze	Total
1	Australia*	2	0	0	2
2	New Zealand	0	2	0	2
3	England	0	0	2	2
Totals (3 entries)		2	2	2	6

== Results ==
=== Men's ===
==== Group A ====
Team	Pld	W	L	PF	PA	PD	Pts
Australia	3	3	0	365	158	+207	6
Nigeria	3	2	1	261	270	−9	5
Scotland	3	1	2	202	277	−75	4
India	3	0	3	190	313	−123	3

March 17
20:15

Australia	129–52	Scotland
Scoring by quarter: 37–17, 32–11, 35–15, 25–9

Bendigo Stadium, Bendigo

March 17
20:15

India	84–113	Nigeria
Scoring by quarter: 21–22, 24–27, 24–31, 15-33

Traralgon Sports Stadium, Traralgon

March 19
11:30

Scotland	67–57	India
Scoring by quarter: 16–9, 20–14, 19–15, 12–19

Geelong Arena, Geelong

March 19
20:15

Australia	103–57	Nigeria
Scoring by quarter: 20–14, 29–17, 24–9, 30–17

Bendigo Stadium, Bendigo

March 20
18:00

Nigeria	91–83	Scotland
Scoring by quarter: 22–14, 17–23, 28–22, 24–24

Bendigo Stadium, Bendigo

March 20
20:15

India	49–133	Australia
Scoring by quarter: 15–37, 6–42, 16–29, 12-25

Ballarat Minerdome, Ballarat

==== Group B ====
Team	Pld	W	L	PF	PA	PD	Pts
New Zealand	3	3	0	263	172	+91	6
England	3	2	1	233	196	+37	5
Barbados	3	1	2	198	238	−40	4
South Africa	3	0	3	183	271	−88	3

March 16
18:00

New Zealand	88–58	South Africa
Scoring by quarter: 27–9, 12–13, 24–13, 25–23

Bendigo Stadium, Bendigo

March 16
18:00

Barbados	59–75	England
Scoring by quarter: 13–14, 16–21, 23–11, 7-29

Traralgon Sports Stadium, Traralgon

March 18
18:00

New Zealand	84–63	England
Scoring by quarter: 18–17, 21–12, 18–11, 27–23

Bendigo Stadium, Bendigo

March 18
20:15

South Africa	72–88	Barbados
Scoring by quarter: 10–23, 11–27, 20–22, 31-16

Ballarat Minerdome, Ballarat

March 19
20:15

Barbados	51–91	New Zealand
Scoring by quarter: 8–24, 13–23, 13–20, 17-24

Geelong Arena, Geelong

March 20
11:30

England	95–53	South Africa
Scoring by quarter: 22-14, 25–12, 22–12, 26–15

Ballarat Minerdome, Ballarat

==== Fifth to eighth place ====
March 21
18:00

Scotland	91–79	South Africa
Scoring by quarter: 26-18, 18–20, 24–23, 23–18

Melbourne Multi Purpose Venue, Melbourne

March 21
20:15

India	55–96	Barbados
Scoring by quarter: 8–26, 12–27, 17–22, 18-21

Geelong Arena, Geelong

==== Seventh place ====
March 23
11:30

South Africa	65–59	India
Scoring by quarter: 14-7, 18–18, 17–21, 16–13

Melbourne Multi Purpose Venue, Melbourne

==== Fifth-place match ====
March 23
13:45

Scotland	63–73	Barbados
Scoring by quarter: 18–15, 12–21, 18–23, 15-14

Melbourne Multi Purpose Venue, Melbourne

==== Semifinals ====
March 22
13:45

Australia	101–75	England
Scoring by quarter: 27-23, 23–23, 27–12, 24–17

Melbourne Multi Purpose Venue, Melbourne

March 22
20:15

Nigeria	66–90	New Zealand
Scoring by quarter: 17–23, 16-27, 20–20, 13-20

Melbourne Multi Purpose Venue, Melbourne

==== Bronze-medal match ====
March 24
18:00

England	80–57	Nigeria
Scoring by quarter: 15-15, 30–12, 22–15, 13–15

Melbourne Multi Purpose Venue, Melbourne

==== Gold-medal match ====
March 24
20:15

Australia	81–76	New Zealand
Scoring by quarter: 25-15, 11–22, 25–25, 20–14

Melbourne Multi Purpose Venue, Melbourne

=== Women's ===
==== Group A ====
Team	Pld	W	L	PF	PA	PD	Pts
Australia	3	3	0	303	115	+188	6
England	3	2	1	231	198	+33	5
India	3	1	2	161	262	−101	4
Mozambique	3	0	3	126	246	−120	3

March 16
20:15

Australia	146–46	India
Scoring by quarter: 41-6, 31-14, 33-10, 41-16

Traralgon Sports Stadium, Traralgon

March 18
20:15

Mozambique	46–84	England
Scoring by quarter: 16–22, 6–22, 11-20, 13-20

Bendigo Stadium, Bendigo

March 18
18:00

England	104–57	India
Scoring by quarter: 25-19, 38-16, 11-6, 30-16

Ballarat Minerdome, Ballarat

March 19
20:15

Mozambique	26–104	Australia
Scoring by quarter: 7-21, 3-20, 12-33, 4-30

Bendigo Stadium, Bendigo

March 19
18:30

Australia	95–43	England
Scoring by quarter: 21-17, 26-11, 22-8, 26-7

Geelong Arena, Geelong

March 20
13:45

India	58–54	Mozambique
Scoring by quarter: 13-15, 15-9, 18-16, 12-14

Ballarat Minerdome, Ballarat

==== Group B ====
Team	Pld	W	L	PF	PA	PD	Pts
New Zealand	3	3	0	313	156	+157	6
Nigeria	3	2	1	236	194	+42	5
Malaysia	3	1	2	242	275	−33	4
Malta	3	0	3	156	281	−125	3

March 17
18:00

New Zealand	127–47	Malta
Scoring by quarter: 30-14, 29-11, 34-16, 34-6

Traralgon Sports Stadium, Traralgon

March 17
18:00

Malaysia	67–97	Nigeria
Scoring by quarter: 18-17, 21-27, 15-24, 13-29

Bendigo Stadium, Bendigo

March 19
13:45

Malta	44–86	Nigeria
Scoring by quarter: 11-17, 11–24, 15-19, 7-26

Geelong Arena, Geelong

March 19
18:00

New Zealand	113–56	Malaysia
Scoring by quarter: 26-14, 29-14, 33-12, 25-16

Bendigo Stadium, Bendigo

March 20
18:00

Malaysia	68–65	Malta
Scoring by quarter: 11-17, 13–15, 24-18, 20-15

Ballarat Minerdome, Ballarat

March 20
20:15

Nigeria	53–83	New Zealand
Scoring by quarter: 15-13, 5-21, 18-24, 15-25

Bendigo Stadium, Bendigo

==== Fifth to eighth place ====
March 21
11:30

India	80–47	Malta
Scoring by quarter: 24-14, 17-13, 20-15, 19-5

Melbourne Multi Purpose Venue, Melbourne

March 21
18:00

Mozambique	80–70	Malaysia
Scoring by quarter: 22-14, 27-10, 13-27, 18-19

Geelong Arena, Geelong

==== Seventh place ====
March 22
11:30

Malta	59–63	Malaysia
Scoring by quarter: 14-11, 12-19, 21-14, 12-19

Melbourne Multi Purpose Venue, Melbourne

==== Fifth-place match ====
March 22
18:00

India	44–70	Mozambique
Scoring by quarter: 10-23, 12–9, 5-19, 17-19

Melbourne Multi Purpose Venue, Melbourne

==== Semifinals ====
March 21
13:45

Australia	105–49	Nigeria
Scoring by quarter: 33-5, 16-10, 30-16, 26-18

Melbourne Multi Purpose Venue, Melbourne

March 21
20:15

England	67–74	New Zealand
Scoring by quarter: 13-19, 16-19, 23-23, 15-13

Melbourne Multi Purpose Venue, Melbourne

==== Bronze-medal match ====
March 23
18:00

Nigeria	75–78	England
Scoring by quarter: 17-16, 13-20, 16-19, 29-23

Melbourne Multi Purpose Venue, Melbourne

==== Gold-medal match ====
March 23
20:15

Australia	77–39	New Zealand
Scoring by quarter: 23-11, 15-8, 22-6, 17-14

Melbourne Multi Purpose Venue, Melbourne
