= Bermuda men's national basketball team =

Bermuda
- FIBA ranking: 120 ▼3 (1 September 2026)
- Joined FIBA: 1998
- FIBA zone: FIBA Americas
- National federation: Bermuda Basketball Association
- Coach: Gavin MacKenzie

FIBA AmeriCup
- Appearances: None

Caribbean Championship
- Appearances: 3
- Medals: None
Home	Away

Bermuda national basketball team represents Bermuda in international competitions. It is administered by the Bermuda Basketball Association (BBA).

Despite Bermuda's very small population, its basketball team has qualified for the Caribbean Basketball Championship twice. At this event, Bermuda left behind competition from countries such as Guyana, which has more than ten times Bermuda's population size.

== Roster ==
2026 Bermuda Men's National Team

Bermuda men's national basketball team roster
Players
Coaches

Pos.	No.	Name	Age – Date of birth	Height	Club
G	1	Cameron Basden	20 – 8 March 2006	1.85 m (6 ft 1 in)
F	2	Leigh Williams	25 – 7 December 2000	1.96 m (6 ft 5 in)	Washington Adventist University
G	5	Eric Lambert	26 – 5 November 1999	1.85 m (6 ft 1 in)	Mount St. Vincent University
G	6	Anton Harris-Gilbert	19 – 30 March 2007	1.85 m (6 ft 1 in)	Teesside Lions
G	7	Samuel Darrell	23 – 4 July 2002	1.83 m (6 ft 0 in)	Bermuda Chargers
G	8	Caelin Peters	24 – 25 October 2001	1.90 m (6 ft 3 in)	Connecticut College Camels
G	9	Adam McDonald	22 – 27 June 2003	1.88 m (6 ft 2 in)	University of the Fraser Valley
F	11	Malachi Scott	22 – 24 January 2004	2.03 m (6 ft 8 in)	Brock University
PG	22	Steveland Brown-Darrell	36 – 14 March 1990	1.83 m (6 ft 0 in)	Bermuda Chargers
C	24	Jonathan Lowe	35 – 2 June 1991	2.01 m (6 ft 7 in)	Johnson and Wales University
F	32	DeNash Davis	? – 17 May 2006	2.03 m (6 ft 8 in)	Thomas College

Head coach

- (United States) Sullivan Phillips

Assistant coach(es)

- (Bermuda) Gavin MacKenzie

Team for the 2015 FIBA CBC Championship.

Bermuda men's national basketball team roster
Players
Coaches

Pos.	No.	Name	Age – Date of birth	Height	Club
G	3	Husayn Symonds	29 – 28 December 1985	1.85 m (6 ft 1 in)
F	4	Yusef Riley	20 – 3 September 1994	1.96 m (6 ft 5 in)	Paine College	(United States)
G/F	5	Chris Crumpler	32 – 26 March 1983	1.91 m (6 ft 3 in)	Paget Bear Cats	(Bermuda)
G/F	7	Shannon Thompson	29 – 8 October 1985	1.78 m (5 ft 10 in)	Warwick Rim Rockers	(Bermuda)
G	8	Steven Simons	33 – 28 March 1982	1.80 m (5 ft 11 in)	Smith's Wild Cats	(Bermuda)
G/F	9	John Lee	33 – 22 April 1982	1.91 m (6 ft 3 in)	Devonshire Dragons	(Bermuda)
F	10	Jason Simons	28 – 14 October 1986	1.90 m (6 ft 3 in)	Smith's Wild Cats	(Bermuda)
C	11	Jonathan Lowe	30 – 3 March 1985	2.01 m (6 ft 7 in)	Johnson & Wales University	(United States)
G/F	12	Sullivan Phillips	36 – 9 February 1979	1.98 m (6 ft 6 in)	BG 74 Göttingen	(Germany)
F	14	Jahvon Jones	32 – 6 May 1983	1.98 m (6 ft 6 in)	St. George's International	(Bermuda)
G/F	15	Jason Lowe	30 – 3 March 1985	1.93 m (6 ft 4 in)	Somerset Flyers	(Bermuda)

Head coach

- (Bermuda) Roderick Spencer

Assistant coach(es)

- (Bermuda) Gavin MacKenzie

Legend

- Club – describes last
  club before the tournament
- Age – describes age
  on 15 June 2015

Roster
National Team at LatinBasket.com

== Competitions ==
=== Performance at FIBA AmeriCup ===
yet to qualify

=== Performance at Caribbean Championship ===
- 2000 : -
- 2002 : -
- 2004 : -
- 2006 : -
- 2007 : -
- 2009 : 8th
- 2011 : 5th
- 2014 : -
- 2015: 8th
- 2018 : 8th

=== Commonwealth Games ===
never participated

== Head coach position ==
- (Bermuda) Roderick Spencer – 2002-2016
- (Bermuda) Gavin MacKenzie -2016-
