= Cayman Islands women's national under-17 basketball team =

Cayman Islands
- FIBA zone: FIBA Americas

World Championships
- Appearances: None

Americas Championships
- Appearances: None

Centrobasket
- Appearances: 1 (2011)
- Medals: None

The Cayman Islands women's national under-16 and under-17 basketball team is a national basketball team of the Cayman Islands, administered by the Cayman Islands Basketball Association. It represents the country in international under-16 and under-17 (under age 16 and under age 17) women' basketball competitions.

== See also ==
- Cayman Islands men's national basketball team
