= Hannover Korbjäger =

- Leagues: Regionalliga
- Founded: 2006
- Location: Hannover, Germany
- Website: Official Website

Hannover Korbjäger is a German professional basketball team located in Hannover, Germany. The team currently competes in the Regionalliga.

The club is internationally known because some of its players have either represented their senior national teams (Ebanks) or were selected for All Star games in a 1st division European league (Dunovic, Rasmussen).

== Notable players ==
- (Cayman Islands) Jorge Ebanks
