= Ivan Aska =

U.S. Virgin Islander-Puerto Rican basketball player

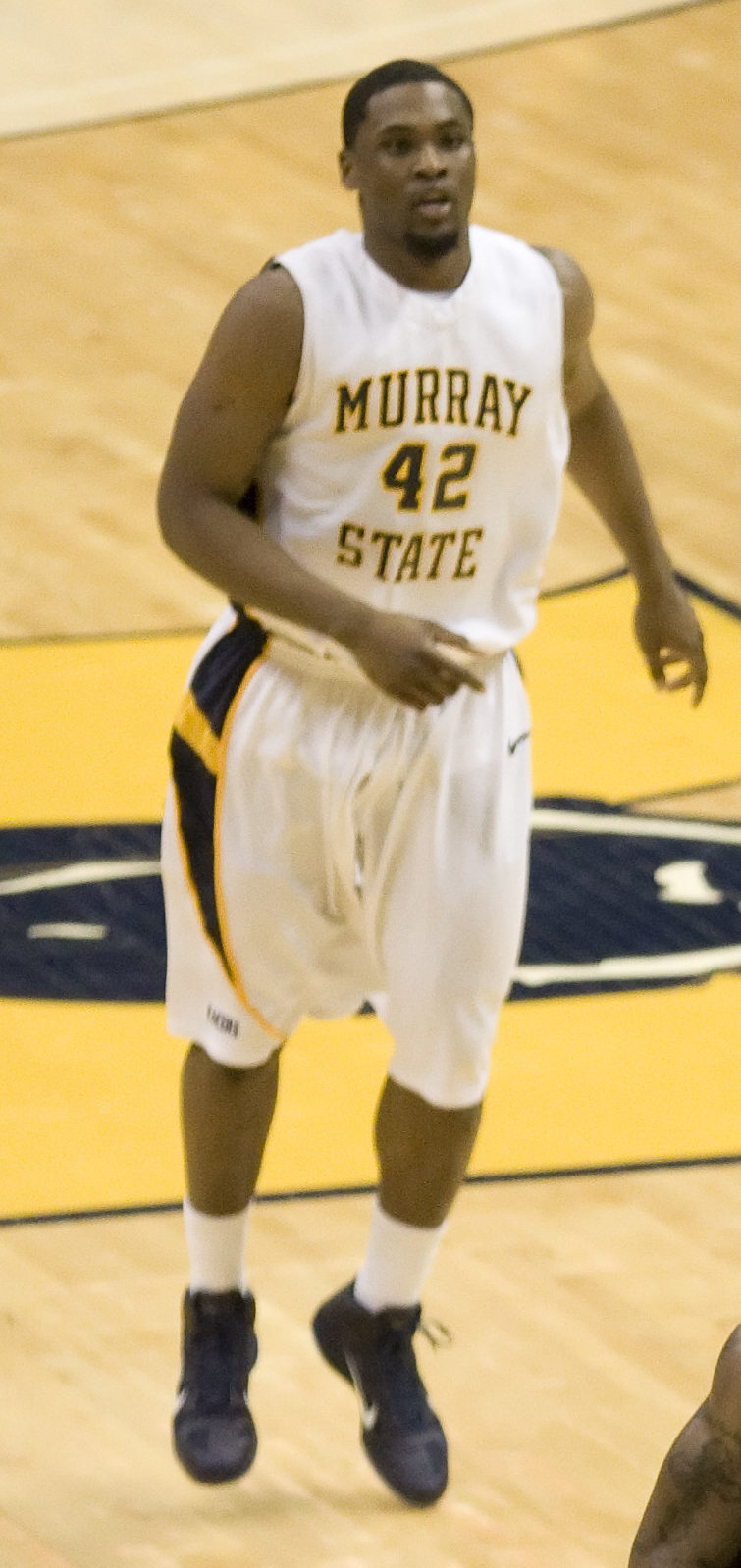
- Aska with Murray State in February 2011

No. 42 – Malvín
- Position: Power forward / center
- League: LUB

Personal information
- Born: June 26, 1990 (age 36) Fort Lauderdale, Florida, U.S.
- Listed height: 6 ft 8 in (2.03 m)
- Listed weight: 230 lb (104 kg)

Career information
- High school: Boyd H. Anderson (Lauderdale Lakes, Florida)
- College: Murray State (2008–2012)
- NBA draft: 2012: undrafted
- Playing career: 2012–present

Career history
- 2012–2013: Leuven Bears
- 2013–2014: Ikaros Chalkidas
- 2014: Cangrejeros de Santurce
- 2014–2015: Maccabi Ashdod
- 2015–2016: Ironi Nes Ziona
- 2016: Ironi Ramat Gan
- 2016–2017: Incheon Electroland Elephants
- 2017: PAOK
- 2017–2018: SLUC Nancy
- 2018: Kolossos Rodou
- 2018–2019: Seoul SK Knights
- 2019–2020: Hapoel Hevel Modi'in
- 2021: Rabotnički
- 2021–2022: DEAC
- 2022–2023: Malvín
- 2023: Soles de Mexicali
- 2023: San Miguel Beermen
- 2024: Al-Ahli Jeddah
- 2024–2025: Urunday Universitario
- 2025: New Taipei CTBC DEA
- 2026: Tokyo Hachioji Bee Trains
- 2026: Titanes del Distrito
- 2026–present: Malvín

Career highlights
- FIBA CBC Championship MVP (2015); Second-team All-OVC (2012); OVC Freshman of the Year (2009)

Ivan Aska (born June 26, 1990) is a U.S. Virgin Islander-Puerto Rican professional basketball player for Malvín of the Liga Uruguaya de Básquetbol (LUB). He has also represented the senior men's U.S. Virgin Islands national basketball team. He played college basketball for Murray State's Racers. He is a 2.03 m (6 ft 8 in) tall power forward-center.

== High school ==
Aska played high school basketball at Boyd H. Anderson High School, in Lauderdale Lakes, Florida.

== College career ==
Aska played college basketball at Murray State University, with the Murray State Racers, from 2008 to 2012. He was named the Ohio Valley Conference Freshman of the Year in 2009, and second-team All-Ohio Valley Conference (OVC) in 2012. As a senior, Aska averaged 10.6 points and six rebounds per game.

== Professional career ==
Aska signed with the German Basketball Bundesliga club ALBA Berlin, in 2015, but he left the club before playing in any official games with them. He joined the Greek Basket League club, PAOK, in March 2017.

On August 28, 2017, Aska signed a deal with the SLUC Nancy Basket out in France's LNB Pro A. On August 5, 2018, Aska returned to Greece once more for Kolossos Rodou.

On December 31, 2018, Aska signed with the Seoul SK Knights of the Korean Basketball League to replace DaJuan Summers for two weeks.

On August 1, 2019, Aska returned to Israel for a second stint, signing a one-year deal with Hapoel Hevel Modi'in of the Israeli National League.

Aska joined Rabotnički in 2021 and averaged 13.8 points, 6.1 rebounds, and 1.3 steals per game. On August 3, 2021, Aska signed with DEAC of the Hungarian Nemzeti Bajnokság I/A.

In November 2023, Aska signed with the San Miguel Beermen of the Philippine Basketball Association (PBA) to replace Tyler Stone as the team's import for the 2023–24 PBA Commissioner's Cup.

In January 2024, Aska joined the Al-Ahli Jeddah of the Saudi Basketball League (SBL).

On January 24, 2025, Aska signed with the New Taipei CTBC DEA of the Taiwan Professional Basketball League (TPBL).

== The Basketball Tournament (TBT) ==
In the summer of 2017, Aska played in The Basketball Tournament on ESPN for Team Challenge ALS. He competed for the $2 million prize in 2017, and for Team Challenge ALS, he averaged 8.2 points per game. Aska helped take the sixth-seeded Team Challenge ALS to the Championship Game of the tournament, where they lost in a close game to Overseas Elite 86–83.

== U.S. Virgin Islands national team ==
Aska has been a member of the senior men's U.S. Virgin Islands national basketball team. With the U.S. Virgin Islands, Aska has played at the following tournaments: the 2011 FIBA CBC Championship, where he won a gold medal, the 2012 Centrobasket, the 2015 FIBA CBC Championship, where he won a gold medal, and the 2016 Centrobasket.

He was named the MVP of the 2015 FIBA CBC Championship.
