= Nyika Williams =

Vincent-born Japanese professional basketball player

Nyika Williams ニカ・ウィリアムス
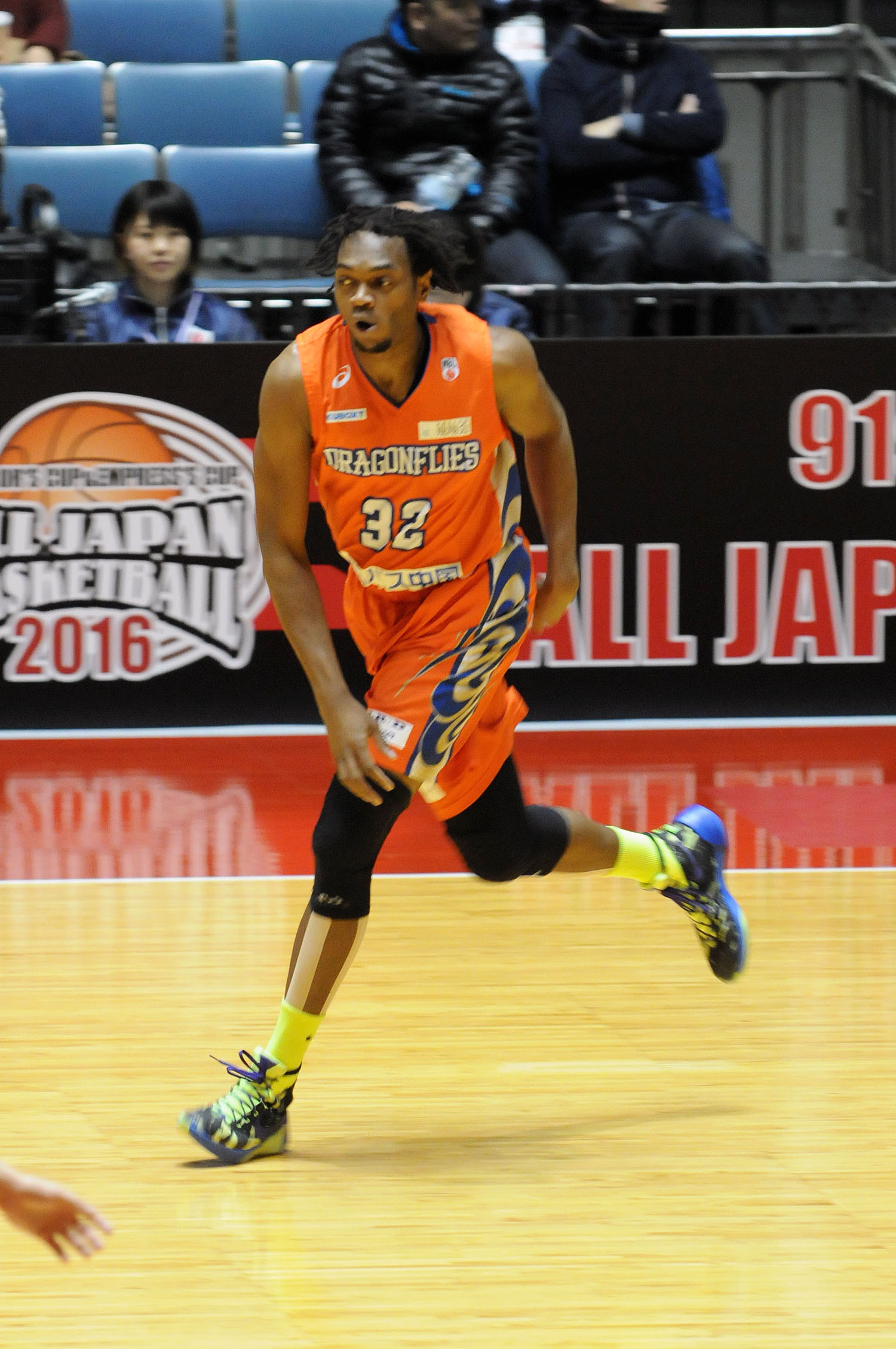
- Williams with Hiroshima in 2016

No. 22 – Chiba Jets
- Position: Center
- League: B.League

Personal information
- Born: July 9, 1987 (age 39) Kingstown, Saint Vincent and the Grenadines
- Listed height: 6 ft 8 in (2.03 m)
- Listed weight: 245 lb (111 kg)

Career information
- High school: Monsignor McClancy Memorial (Queens, New York)
- College: Barton CC (2007-2009); Pacific (2009-2011)
- NBA draft: 2011: undrafted
- Playing career: 2011–present

Career history
- 2011–2012: Takamatsu Five Arrows
- 2012: Saint-Étienne Basket
- 2012: Gunma Crane Thunders
- 2012–2013: Saitama Broncos
- 2013–2014: JS Kairouan
- 2014: KTP Basket
- 2014–2015: Saitama Broncos
- 2015–2016: Hiroshima Dragonflies
- 2016–2017: Kagawa Five Arrows
- 2017–2018: Ehime Orange Vikings
- 2018: Akita Northern Happinets
- 2018–2019: Fukushima Firebonds
- 2019–2020: Akita Northern Happinets
- 2020–2024: Shimane Susanoo Magic
- 2024–2025: San-en NeoPhoenix
- 2025–2026: Toyama Grouses
- 2026–present: Chiba Jets

Career highlights
- Third-team NJCAA All-American (2009); KJCCC MVP (2009)

Nyika Nysanu Kyle Vohnnel Williams (ニカ・ニサヌ・カイル・ヴォネル・ウィリアムス, born July 9, 1987) is a Saint Vincent-born naturalized Japanese professional basketball player for the Chiba Jets of the Japanese B.League. He received a Japanese citizenship on April 19, 2019. He is difficult to guard because of his long arms and jumping ability.

== High school career ==
He joined his brother, Burton Williams Jr., in America, playing 12 months at Monsignor McClancey High School. Averaged 14.6 points, 5.4 rebounds, 75.0 percent free throw.

== College career ==
He played two years for Barton County Community College in Great Bend, KS, then, earned a scholarship to play at Pacific.

== College statistics ==
Year	Team	GP	GS	MPG	FG%	3P%	FT%	RPG	APG	SPG	BPG	PPG
2007-08	Barton	28	6	17	.591	.000	.608	5.5	0.5	1.0	0.9	6.5
2008-09	Barton	33	32	25.9	.695	.000	.660	9.2	0.4	0.88	2.0	15.4
2009-10	Pacific	35	0	7.1	.562	.000	.645	1.71	0.14	0.37	0.26	2.63
2010-11	Pacific	31	26	18.0	.565	.000	.553	4.35	0.19	0.42	0.68	8.10

== Professional career ==
He was voted AfroBasket.com All-Tunisian League Defensive Player of the Year in 2014.

== Career statistics ==
Legend
GP	Games played	GS	Games started	MPG	Minutes per game
FG%	Field goal percentage	3P%	3-point field goal percentage	FT%	Free throw percentage
RPG	Rebounds per game	APG	Assists per game	SPG	Steals per game
BPG	Blocks per game	PPG	Points per game	**Bold**	Career high

*	Led the league

=== Regular season ===
Year	Team	GP	GS	MPG	FG%	3P%	FT%	RPG	APG	SPG	BPG	PPG
2011-12	Takamatsu	50	24	24.3	.554	---	.635	8.1	0.5	1.1	0.9	13.2
2012-13	Saint-Étienne	16						6.6				9.5
2012-13	Gunma	15	10	21.2	.443	---	.632	6.3	0.7	0.8	0.5	9.6
2012-13	Saitama	40		**28.2**	.563	.000	.623	**12.2**	1.2	1.4	0.6	13.5
2014-15	Saitama	34		**28.2**	.571	.000	**.644**	9.7	**1.4**	**1.5**	**1.2**	16.4
2015-16	Hiroshima D	53	3	14.4	.567	.000	.584	4.4	0.4	0.6	0.5	7.0
2016-17	Kagawa	**57**	2	13.7	.506	.000	.504	4.5	0.5	0.5	0.8	6.6
2017-18	Ehime	54	**36**	19.9	**.626***	.000	.543	7.1	0.7	0.9	0.8	13.8
2018-19	Akita	2	1	21.0	.500	.000	.556	4.5	1.0	0.0	0.5	13.5
2018-19	Fukushima	12	12	27.1	.571	.000	.592	7.5	1.2	1.2	0.7	**18.3**
2019-20	Akita	39	1	17.0	.559	.000	.592	5.3	0.7	0.9	0.5	8.1

=== National team ===
Year	Team	GP	GS	MPG	FG%	3P%	FT%	RPG	APG	SPG	BPG	PPG
2014	St. Vincent	5		31.2	.516	.000	.742	6.6	1.4	1.6	1.8	22
2015	St. Vincent	6		27.17	.404	.000	.500	6.5	2.5	1.83	0.67	9.3
2019	Japan	8	0	13.4	.459	.000	.560	5.6	0.4	0.4	0.8	6.0

=== Early cup games ===
Year	Team	GP	GS	MPG	FG%	3P%	FT%	RPG	APG	SPG	BPG	PPG
2019	Akita	2	0	17:39	.786	.000	.500	8.0	1.0	0.0	0.0	12.5

=== Preseason games ===
Year	Team	GP	GS	MPG	FG%	3P%	FT%	RPG	APG	SPG	BPG	PPG
2018	Akita	2	0	14.3	.696	.000	.400	9.0	0.5	0.0	0.0	17.0
2019	Akita	3	0	14.7	.500	.000	.571	4.7	0.0	1.0	1.3	6.67

Source: Changwon1Changwon2 Source: UtsunomiyaToyamaSendai

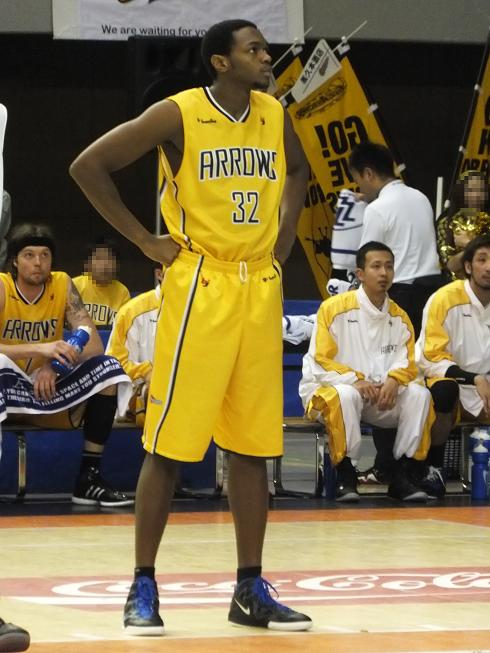
Williams with Five Arrows

== Personal ==
He is the son of Burton Williams and Georgina Placida Williams. Nyika is the third of four children born to his parents. His siblings are Burton Jr., Enyinne, and Zena. He married his wife, Yuko Williams, on March 18, 2015. They have a son, Kyle.
