= Jorge Ebanks =

Caymanian basketball player (born 1986)

Personal information
- Born: March 2, 1986 (age 40)
- Listed height: 6 ft 1 in (1.85 m)

Career information
- Playing career: 2010–present
- Position: Point guard / shooting guard

Career history
- 2015: Cheshire Phoenix
- 2016–17: Hannover Korbjäger
- 2017-2021: Worthing Thunder

Jorge Ebanks (born March 2, 1986) is a Cayman Islands professional basketball player. He currently plays for the Worthing Thunder club of the NBL.

He represented the Cayman Islands national basketball team at the 2015 FIBA CBC Championship where he was his team's best scorer, passer and stealer.
