= Guyana men's national basketball team =

Guyana
- FIBA ranking: 106 ▼3 (1 September 2026)
- Joined FIBA: 1961
- FIBA zone: FIBA Americas
- National federation: Guyana Basketball Federation (GBF)
- Coach: Junior Hercules

FIBA AmeriCup
- Appearances: None

Caribbean Championship
- Appearances: 8
- Medals: Silver: 1994; Bronze: 1981, 2000
Home	Away

The Guyana national basketball team represents Guyana in international competitions. It is governed by the Guyana Basketball Federation (GBF).

Its main accomplishment was the silver medal at the 1994 Caribbean Basketball Championship.

In 2019, Guyana's top player Delroy James wanted to join the national team. Yet, he did not get his passport extended in time.

== Roster ==
2019 Squad at FIBA AmeriCup 2021 Pre-Qualifiers:

Guyana men's national basketball team roster
Players
Coaches

Pos.	No.	Name	Age – Date of birth	Height	Club
SF	4	Travis Belgrave	21 – 4 August 1997	6 ft 2 in (1.88 m)	Eagles (Guyana)	(Guyana)
C	6	Shaine Webster	30 – 27 March 1988	6 ft 5 in (1.96 m)	Colts (Guyana)	(Guyana)
PF	8	Anthony Moe	28 – 4 April 1990	6 ft 10 in (2.08 m)	Albany Patroons	(United States)
SF	9	Harold Adams	30 – 16 August 1988	6 ft 1 in (1.85 m)	Victory Valley Royals	(Guyana)
SG	10	Timothy Thompson	19 – 16 April 1999	6 ft 1 in (1.85 m)	Colts (Guyana)	(Guyana)
PG	11	Stanton Rose	19 – 26 December 1999	6 ft 0 in (1.83 m)	Panola College	(United States)
SG	12	Orlon Glasgow	33 – 3 November 1985	6 ft 1 in (1.85 m)	Victory Valley Royals	(Guyana)
SG	13	Kevon Wiggins	18 – 19 October 2000	6 ft 2 in (1.88 m)	Monroe College	(United States)
G	14	Yonnick Tappin	19 – 20 May 1999		Victory Valley Royals	(Guyana)
PG	15	Travis Burnett	30 – 28 June 1988	5 ft 11 in (1.8 m)	Cobras (Guyana)	(Guyana)

Head coach

- (Guyana) Junior Hercules

Assistant coach(es)

- (Guyana) Dennis Clarke

Legend

- Club – describes last
  club before the tournament
- Age – describes age
  on 24 February 2019

=== Depth chart ===
Pos.	Starting 5	Bench 1	Bench 2
C	Anthony Moe
PF	Travis Belgrave	Shaine Webster
SF	Kevon Wiggins	Harold Adams
SG	Travis Burnett	Timothy Thompson
PG	Stanton Rose	Orlon Glasgow	Yonnick Tappin

== Competitions ==
=== Performance at CaribeBasket ===
Year	Position	Host
1981	3rd place	Georgetown, Guyana
1984	?	Nassau, Bahamas
1987	?	Suriname
1988	5th place	Georgetown, Guyana
1990	4th	Port-of-Spain, Trinidad and Tobago
1993	4th	Bridgetown, Barbados
1994	2nd place	Georgetown, Guyana
1996	4th place	Port-of-Spain, Trinidad and Tobago
2000	3rd place	Bridgetown, Barbados
2007	8th place	Caguas, Puerto Rico
2011	7th place	Nassau, Bahamas
2014	5th place	Tortola, British Virgin Islands
2015	10th place	Tortola, British Virgin Islands
2018	1st place	Paramaribo, Suriname

== Past rosters ==
Team for the 2015 FIBA CBC Championship.

Guyana men's national basketball team roster
Players
Coaches

Pos.	No.	Name	Age – Date of birth	Height	Club
G	4	Dave Causway	27 – 4 April 1988	5 ft 7 in (1.7 m)	Royal Extra Lions	(Trinidad and Tobago)
PF	5	Gordon James	35 – 28 December 1979	6 ft 6 in (1.98 m)	Alianza Viedma	(Argentina)
SF	6	Travis Burnett	26 – 23 June 1988	6 ft 3 in (1.91 m)
SF	7	Akeem Kanhai	23 – 23 July 1991	6 ft 4 in (1.93 m)
PF	8	Ryan Gullen	29 – 3 May 1986	6 ft 3 in (1.91 m)	Pacesetters	(Guyana)
SG	9	Jason Squires	29 – 2 December 1985	5 ft 10 in (1.78 m)
G	10	Ryan Stephney	29 – 24 February 1986	6 ft 0 in (1.83 m)
G	11	Shelroy Thomas	24 – 30 December 1990	6 ft 1 in (1.85 m)
C	12	Jermaine Slater	25 – 6 September 1989	6 ft 6 in (1.98 m)
PG	13	Chris Williams	25 – 17 August 1989	6 ft 2 in (1.88 m)
C	14	Rudolph James	33 – 15 April 1982	6 ft 8 in (2.03 m)
SF	15	Keron McKenzie	28 – 19 November 1986	6 ft 7 in (2.01 m)	Atlanta Assault	(United States)

Head coach

- (Guyana) Darcell Harris

Assistant coach(es)

- (Guyana) Marlon Rodriguez

Legend

- Club – describes last
  club before the tournament
- Age – describes age
  on 20 August 2015

The side that represented Guyana at the CBC Sr. Championship 2007 was composed of:

Jersey number	Position played	Height	Name	Year of birth	Club otherwise represented
15	Center	208	Antric Klaiber	1976	Eintracht Frankfurt Basketball
13	Forward	204	Lorenzo Withrite	1981	Scarlet Vilvoorde
12	Guard, forward	193	Kevin Creppy	1987	Bethune-Cookman College
14	Forward	206	Gordon Klaiber	1983	Brooklyn Kings
7	Guard	176	Carl Benn	1980	U. of Mass. – Lowell
10	Guard	185	Robert Davis	1984	South Carolina All Stars (UMBL)
8	Guard	176	Shawn Powell	1976	Salisbury State
11	Guard	176	Michael Creepy Jr.	1985	Riverside
HC	Head Coach	---	Stephen Nurse	----	DC Jammers
AC	Asst. Head Coach	---	Larry Davis	----	South Carolina All Stars (UMBL)
M	Manager	---	Paul Haynes	----	NYU – Polytechnic University
M	Head of Delegation	----	Patrick Haynes	----	NYU – Polytechnic University

== Head coach position ==
- (Guyana) Robert Cadogan – 2011
- (Guyana) Mark Agard – 2014
- (Guyana) Darcell Harris – 2015
- (Guyana) Junior Hercules – 2018-present

== Kit ==
=== Manufacturer ===
2019: Nike

== See also ==
- Basketball in Guyana
- Guyana women's national basketball team
