= Guyana Basketball Federation =

Governing body of basketball in Guyana

- Sport: Basketball
- Jurisdiction: Guyana
- Abbreviation: GBF
- Founded: 1961; 65 years ago
- Affiliation: FIBA
- Affiliation date: FIBA: 1961; 65 years ago
- Regional affiliation: FIBA Americas
- Headquarters: Georgetown

Official website
- guyanabasketball.com/gy/
- (Guyana)

The Guyana Basketball Federation was founded in 1961 to organize, manage and develop basketball in Guyana.

The federation promotes basketball both nationally and internationally during global sporting events. It has been affiliated to FIBA since 1961, as well as to FIBA Americas.

The federation also organizes the national championship in the country.
