= Kurt Looby =

Antiguan professional basketball player (born 1984)

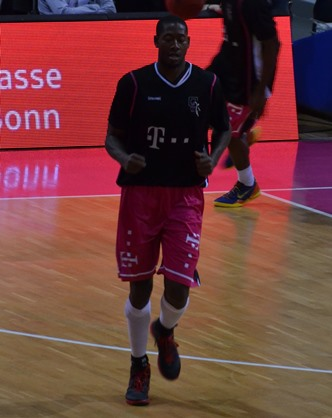
- Looby with Telekom Baskets Bonn

Personal information
- Born: February 14, 1984 (age 42) St. John's, Antigua and Barbuda
- Listed height: 6 ft 11 in (2.11 m)
- Listed weight: 250 lb (113 kg)

Career information
- College: Tyler JC (2003–2005); Iowa (2006–2008)
- NBA draft: 2008: undrafted
- Playing career: 2008–2017
- Position: Center

Career history
- 2008–2009: Rio Grande Valley Vipers
- 2009: Grises de Humacao
- 2009–2010: Rio Grande Valley Vipers
- 2010: Albuquerque Thunderbirds
- 2010: Maine Red Claws
- 2010: Mets de Guaynabo
- 2010–2011: Peristeri
- 2011–2012: EnBW Ludwigsburg
- 2012: Vaqueros de Bayamón
- 2012–2013: Trefl Sopot
- 2013–2014: Telekom Baskets Bonn
- 2014–2015: Panelefsiniakos
- 2015: Anwil Włocławek
- 2017: JA Vichy

Career highlights
- Polish Cup winner (2013)

Kurt Looby (born February 14, 1984) is an Antiguan professional basketball player. He played collegiately for the Iowa Hawkeyes men's basketball team and professionally in the NBA Development League, Europe and Puerto Rico.

== Collegiate career ==
During his time at High School in Antigua and Barbuda, Looby played soccer. He began playing basketball while attending Tyler Junior College in Tyler, Texas. He played at Tyler for two seasons before receiving a scholarship at Iowa University. After redshirting his first season at Iowa, the Caribbean power forward played for coach Steve Alford with the Hawkeyes from 2006 to 2008.

== Professional career ==
Looby began his professional career in the NBA Development League with the Rio Grande Valley Vipers. On January 16, 2009, Looby moved into the starting lineup for Rio Grande Valley. The final 29 games of the season, Looby averaged 8.6 points, 11.1 rebounds, and 3.3 blocks per game. He reached double figures in scoring 13 times and double-digits in rebounds 17 times, while recording ten double-doubles and one triple-double. He was traded midway through his second season with the Vipers to the Albuquerque Thunderbirds, with whom he played 26 games. While playing for the Albuquerque Thunderbirds, Looby average 31 minutes per game, 9 rebounds, 3.27 blocks per game and a second career triple-double of 12 points, 11 rebounds, and 10 blocks-shots against Dakota Wizards. Following those 26 games, he was traded to the Maine Red Claws for Trey Gilder. At the time, he was second in the Development League in blocked shots per game, averaging 3.1. With the Red Claws, he averaged 4 blocks a game over 13 games. Through his first two seasons, Looby played in 100 games and averaged 6 points per game, 8 rebounds and 2.9 blocked shots. He complete 22 games with a 9.4 points avg., 10.5 rebounding avg., for third in rebounding, 2.8 blocks avg. and (166) block-shots, a D-League record. After playing the NBA Development League for 2009–2010. Kurt signed with Mets de Guaynabo of Puerto Rico's Baloncesto Superior Nacional, where he played 8 games and 27.4 minutes a game. Looby also playing in Puerto Rico's Baloncesto Superior Nacional in 2009 where he played 22 games with an average 30 minutes a game, 10.5 rebounds, third in rebounding and 2.8 Blocks per game, leading block-shots record for the BSN league. In September 2010, Looby signed a contract with Peristeri B.C. in Athens, Greece. Kurt Looby ended his 2010–2011 season in Greece with a 28 games played and 23 min. avg. per game. FGM-A 54%, 6.5 points avg., 7.0 rebounds avg., and 1.1 block shot avg. This set Looby as 8th in rebounding and 4th in block shots in the Greece league for the season. Kurt Looby has signed with EnBW Ludwigsburg team of the (BBL) in Germany for the 2011–12 basketball season. In the 2012–13 season he played for Trefl Sopot. In December 2014, he signed with Panelefsiniakos.

== Personal ==
Looby was born and raised in St. John's, Antigua and Barbuda.His wife Lynisha Samuel-Looby, daughter Kalea Looby and son Katryel Looby. His late mother Olivet Looby. He was an African American World Studies major at Iowa.
