= Saint Vincent and the Grenadines men's national basketball team =

Saint Vincent and the Grenadines
- FIBA ranking: NR (1 September 2026)
- Joined FIBA: 1984
- FIBA zone: FIBA Americas
- National federation: St. Vincent and the Grenadines Basketball Association
- Coach: Justin Scott

FIBA AmeriCup
- Appearances: None

Caribbean Championship
- Appearances: 5
- Medals: None
Home	Away

The Saint Vincent and the Grenadines national basketball team represents Saint Vincent and the Grenadines in international competitions. It is administered by the St. Vincent and the Grenadines Basketball Association.

Its best result was 6th place at the 2015 FIBA CBC Championship.

== Matches ==
=== 2026 ===
8 July FIBA Americup Pre-Qualifiers	Saint Vincent and the Grenadines	85-66	Grenada

10 July FIBA Americup Pre-Qualifiers	Saint Vincent and the Grenadines	96-63	Cayman Islands

11 July FIBA Americup Pre-Qualifiers	Haiti	100-66	Saint Vincent and the Grenadines

12 July FIBA Americup Pre-Qualifies	Barbados	96-84	Saint Vincent and the Grenadines

== Competitions ==
=== FIBA AmeriCup ===
yet to qualify

=== Caribbean Championship ===
- 1985-2000 : ?
- 2002 : 9th
- 2004 : ?
- 2006 : 7th
- 2007 : ?
- 2009 : ?
- 2011 : 8th
- 2014 : 8th
- 2015 : 6th

== Current roster ==
2018 Squad at FIBA AmeriCup 2021 Pre-Qualifiers:

Saint Vincent and the Grenadines men's national basketball team roster
Players
Coaches

Pos.	No.	Name	Age – Date of birth	Height	Club
PG	4	Reinaldo Millington	35 – 14 January 1983	5 ft 10 in (1.78 m)
PG	5	Darreo Glasgow	20 – 14 October 1997	6 ft 2 in (1.88 m)	College of Central Florida	(United States)
PF	6	Kirsten Lampkin	? – 5 February 1992	6 ft 7 in (2.01 m)
SF	7	Phillip Lawrence-Ricks	24 – 4 May 1994	6 ft 8 in (2.03 m)	Barreirense Basket	(Portugal)
SG	8	Sean Baptiste	30 – 4 April 1988	6 ft 3 in (1.91 m)	MetroWest Ballas	(United States)
C	9	Akeme Smart	27 – 15 February 1991	7 ft 2 in (2.18 m)	Brujos Izalco	(El Salvador)
SG	10	Nicholas Lewis	17 – 6 October 2000	5 ft 11 in (1.8 m)
PF	11	John Gardiner	34 – 19 November 1983	6 ft 9 in (2.06 m)	Leones de Managua	(Nicaragua)
SF	12	Opong Bramble	21 – 11 March 1997	6 ft 6 in (1.98 m)	NYIT Bears	(United States)
F	13	Chrisford Telesford	30 – 1 April 1988	6 ft 5 in (1.96 m)
SF	14	Alexis Foyle	39 – 17 September 1978	6 ft 6 in (1.98 m)	NYC Thunder	(United States)
PF	15	Dameon Ottley	29 – 30 December 1988	6 ft 8 in (2.03 m)	East (British Virgin Islands)	(British Virgin Islands)
		Cody Michael Compton	18 – 27 September 1999

Head coach

- (United States) Justin Scott

Assistant coach(es)

- (Saint Vincent and the Grenadines) Wayne Williams

Legend

- Club – describes last
  club before the tournament
- Age – describes age
  on 30 June 2018

=== Depth chart ===
Pos.	Starting 5	Bench 1	Bench 2
C	Akeme Smart	Dameon Ottley
PF	Chrisford Telesford	John Gardiner	Kirsten Lampkin
SF	Phillip Lawrence-Ricks	Opong Bramble
SG	Sean Baptiste	Alexis Foyle	Nicholas Lewis
PG	Darreo Glasgow		Reinaldo Millington

== Past rosters ==
Team for the 2015 FIBA CBC Championship.

Saint Vincent and the Grenadines men's national basketball team roster
Players
Coaches

Pos.	No.	Name	Age – Date of birth	Height	Club
F/C	4	Nyika Williams	27 – 9 July 1987	6 ft 8 in (2.03 m)	Saitama Broncos	(Japan)
G	5	Steveon Taylor	27 – 5 March 1988	6 ft 1 in (1.85 m)
F	6	Brian Ofori	23 – 28 April 1992	6 ft 5 in (1.96 m)	UPEI Panthers	(Canada)
G	7	Quincy Jackson	37 – 26 May 1978	6 ft 2 in (1.88 m)	San Jacinto Central	(United States)
G	8	Sean Baptiste	27 – 4 April 1988	6 ft 3 in (1.91 m)	Metrowest Ballas	(United States)
G	9	Lezlo McKenzie	35 – 14 October 1979	5 ft 11 in (1.8 m)
C	10	Shawn King	33 – 6 June 1982	6 ft 10 in (2.08 m)	STB Le Havre	(France)
C	11	Akeme Smart	24 – 15 February 1991	7 ft 3 in (2.21 m)	Servigroup Benidorm	(Spain)
F	12	Alexis Foyle	36 – 17 September 1978	6 ft 6 in (1.98 m)	Blacktop Showcase	(Italy)
F	13	Burton Williams	34 – 8 December 1980	6 ft 7 in (2.01 m)	Queens College, City University of New York	(United States)
F	14	Cregg Friday	26 – 30 January 1989	6 ft 9 in (2.06 m)
F	15	Dameon Ottley	26 – 30 December 1988	6 ft 9 in (2.06 m)		(British Virgin Islands)

Head coach

- (United States) Justin Scott

Assistant coach(es)

- (Saint Vincent and the Grenadines) Wayne Williams
- (Saint Vincent and the Grenadines) Sabrina Mitchell

Legend

- Club – describes last
  club before the tournament
- Age – describes age
  on 20 August 2015

== See also ==
- Saint Vincent and the Grenadines women's national basketball team
