= Pacesetters =

Energy harvesting plan

Pacesetters was a proposed energy-harvesting scheme created by Facility Architects, a London-based design firm. Its announced aim was to harness the vibrations generated by activities within a city and generate electricity for lighting purposes. The electronics company Philips and Hull University also took part in the project.

== History ==
DARPA (Defense Advanced Research Projects Agency) of the United States pioneered research into the field of energy harvesting from vibrations, wanting to reduce the use of heavy rechargeable batteries that power communication devices carried by soldiers into battlefields. Most of the research was spent in development of "heel-strike" generators, powered by the pumping motion of a footstep, which would be embedded within a heel of an army boot. They succeeded in achieving upwards of 3 - 6 watts of power output.

== Design ==
There were two design prototypes considered. The first was a staircase that would contain either hydraulic or piezoelectric mechanisms within the steps to absorb the kinetic energy from stairclimbers' footfalls and convert it into electricity. This method was believed to more efficient as more energy is expended by the commuters to ascend a staircase.

The second design was a Wireless system of lighting that would use tiny generators with components designed to resonate at the same frequency of surrounding vibrations. The resonance would then either move a tiny magnet relative to a coil of wire looped around it or apply pressure to a crystal inside the generator to create current. Light-emitting diodes or LEDs connected to such vibration harvesters could be used to illuminate areas where constant heavy vibration is present, such as train or metro stations, airports or highways. This system would have enabled lighting without any cables or wires connected to the power grid.

== See also ==
- Energy harvesting
