= Rudolph James =

Guyanese weightlifter

Personal information
- Nationality: Guyanese
- Born: 19 July 1945 (age 79)

Sport
- Sport: Weightlifting

Rudolph James (born 19 July 1945) is a Guyanese weightlifter. He competed in the men's light heavyweight event at the 1968 Summer Olympics.
