= Kleon Penn =

Puerto Rican basketball player

Personal information
- Born: 1 September 1986 (age 40) Fajardo, Puerto Rico
- Listed height: 6 ft 11 in (2.11 m)
- Listed weight: 275 lb (125 kg)

Career information
- College: H. Lavity Stoutt CC (2005–2006); McNeese State (2006–2009)
- NBA draft: 2009: undrafted
- Playing career: 2010–2025
- Position: Center
- Number: 50

Career history
- 2010: Caciques de Humacao
- 2010: Soles de Mexicali
- 2010–2011: Potros ITSON
- 2011: Caciques de Humacao
- 2011–2012: Fuerza Regia
- 2012: Caciques de Humacao
- 2012–2013: Huracanes del Atlántico
- 2013: Toros de Aragua
- 2013–2014: Caciques de Humacao
- 2014–2015: Vaqueros de Bayamón
- 2015–2016: Trotamundos de Carabobo
- 2016–2017: Brujos de Guayama
- 2017: Fuerza Regia de Monterrey
- 2017–2018: Correcaminos UAT Victoria
- 2018: Caciques de Humacao
- 2019–2020: Brujos de Guayama
- 2020–2021: Santos de San Luis
- 2021–2023: Brujos de Guayama
- 2023: Cangrejeros de Santurce
- 2024–2025: Osos de Manatí
- 2025: Gigantes de Carolina

Career highlights
- BSN All-Defensive Team (2016); 3× BSN Defensive Player of the Year (2011, 2013, 2014); Honorable mention All-Southland (2009)
- Stats at Basketball Reference

Kleon Penn (born 1 September 1986) is a British Virgin Islander-Puerto Rican former professional basketball player. He played most of his career in the Baloncesto Superior Nacional (BSN), where he is currently the league’s all-time leader in blocks. He played college basketball for H. Lavity Stoutt Community College and McNeese State.

== College career ==
Penn began his career with Tortola's H. Lavity Stoutt Community College where he averaged a double-double and eight blocked shots during the eight-game season while recording a triple-double in one game.

The next season, he transferred to McNeese State where on his second year, he led the conference, ranked fourth in the nation and set a single season school record for blocked shots after ending with 117 for an average of 4.0 per game. By the end of his college career, he was second on the Cowboys' all-time career blocked shots list with 264 career blocked shots.

== Professional career ==
After going undrafted in the 2009 NBA draft, Penn was drafted by the Caciques de Humacao with the second selection of Puerto Rico's 2010 draft and signed afterwards. After averaging 11 points, 8 rebounds and 3.5 blocks per game, he moved to Mexico and played with Soles de Mexicali and Potros ITSON before returning to Humacao where he won the first of three BSN Defensive Player of the Year awards.

On 24 August 2011, he returned to Mexico, this time with Fuerza Regia, however, he missed the rest of the 2011–2012 season after suffering a metatarsal fracture. On 31 March 2012, he returned to Humacao.

On 12 July 2012, he moved to Dominican Republic, this time with Huracanes del Atlántico for the rest of the year and on 18 January 2013 he signed with Venezuelan Toros de Aragua.

After a fourth stint with Humacao, Penn was traded on 21 January 2014 to Vaqueros de Bayamón.

After averaging 4.5 points, 5.5 rebounds and 2.0 blocks in 18.4 minutes per game with Vaqueros, Penn signed with the Minnesota Timberwolves on 18 September 2015. On 24 October 2015, he was waived by the Timberwolves after appearing in three preseason games. On 26 December, he returned to Venezuela, this time with Trotamundos de Carabobo. In February 2016, Penn was acquired by Brujos de Guayama.

As of October 2021, Penn is the BSN’s all-time leader in blocks.

== Personal life ==
Penn was born in Fajardo, Puerto Rico from a British Virgin Islander mother that was visiting. Afterwards, they moved back to Tortola, British Virgin Islands where he grew up.
