= Cayman Islands men's national basketball team =

Cayman Islands
- FIBA ranking: 151 ▼2 (1 September 2026)
- Joined FIBA: 1976
- FIBA zone: FIBA Americas
- National federation: Cayman Islands Basketball Association
- Coach: Edwin Pellot-Rosa

FIBA AmeriCup
- Appearances: None

Caribbean Championship
- Appearances: 2
- Medals: None
Home	Away

The Cayman Islands national basketball team represents the Cayman Islands in international competitions. It is administered by the Cayman Islands Basketball Association. Its best result was 9th place at the 2015 FIBA CBC Championship.

== Roster ==
Team for the 2015 FIBA CBC Championship.

Cayman Islands men's national basketball team roster
Players
Coaches

Pos.	No.	Name	Age – Date of birth	Height	Club
F	4	Joshua Dikau	20 – 26 August 1994	1.90 m (6 ft 3 in)
G/F	5	Jorge Ebanks	29 – 2 March 1986	1.85 m (6 ft 1 in)	Cheshire Phoenix	(United Kingdom)
G	6	Samuel O'Garro	27 – 10 February 1988	1.95 m (6 ft 5 in)	Sol Blazers	(Cayman Islands)
G/F	8	Shaad O'Garro	24 – 25 July 1990	1.99 m (6 ft 6 in)	Sol Blazers	(Cayman Islands)
F	9	Jasen Campbell	28 – 12 November 1986	1.90 m (6 ft 3 in)	Silver Bullets (Cayman Islands)	(Cayman Islands)
G	10	Davion Cotterell	23 – 4 October 1991	1.88 m (6 ft 2 in)	Sol Blazers	(Cayman Islands)
C	11	Xavier Powery-Saunds	22 – 19 January 1993	2.03 m (6 ft 8 in)
F	12	Jake Whittaker	23 – 16 September 1991	1.93 m (6 ft 4 in)	Silver Bullets (Cayman Islands)	(Cayman Islands)
F	13	Deandre Simpson	24 – 27 October 1990	1.96 m (6 ft 5 in)	Sol Blazers	(Cayman Islands)
C	14	Darrell Paddyfoot	24 – 17 July 1990	2.03 m (6 ft 8 in)	Warriors (Cayman Islands)	(Cayman Islands)
C	15	Rotando Thompson	30 – 28 November 1984	2.03 m (6 ft 8 in)	Silver Bullets (Cayman Islands)	(Cayman Islands)

Head coach

- (Cayman Islands) Edwin Pellot-Rosa

Assistant coach(es)

- (Cayman Islands) Duran Whittaker

Legend

- Club – describes last
  club before the tournament

Roster

National Team at LatinBasket.com

== Competitions ==
=== FIBA AmeriCup ===
yet to qualify

=== Caribbean Championship ===
- 1985 : ?
- 1986 : ?
- 1987 : ?
- 1988 : ?
- 1990 : ?
- 1991 : ?
- 1993 : ?
- 1994 : ?
- 1995 : ?
- 1996 : ?
- 1998 : -
- 2000 : -
- 2002 : -
- 2004 : -
- 2006 : -
- 2007 : -
- 2009 : -
- 2011 : 9th
- 2014 : -
- 2015 : 9th

=== Commonwealth Games ===
never participated

== See also ==
- Cayman Islands women's national basketball team
- Cayman Islands women's national under-17 basketball team
