= Barbados men's national basketball team =

Barbados
- FIBA ranking: NR (1 September 2026)
- Joined FIBA: 1962
- FIBA zone: FIBA Americas
- National federation: Barbados Amateur Basketball Association (BABA)
- Coach: Nigel Lloyd

Olympic Games
- Appearances: None

FIBA World Cup
- Appearances: None

FIBA AmeriCup
- Appearances: 1
- Medals: None

Caribbean Championship
- Appearances: 8
- Medals: Gold: 1994, 2000; Silver: 1998, 2004
Home	Away	Third
Fourth	Fifth	Sixth

Barbados national basketball team represents Barbados in international competitions. It is administered by the Barbados Amateur Basketball Association (BABA).

At the Caribbean Basketball Championship, Barbados has been one of the strongest teams, winning two gold medals and two silver medals.

== Competitive record ==
=== FIBA AmeriCup ===
Year	Position	Tournament	Host
1995	10th	1995 FIBA Americas Championship	Argentina

=== Caribbean Championship ===
- 1981 : 4th
- 1982-1993 : ?
- 1994 : (gold)
- 1995-1996 : ?
- 1998 : (silver)
- 2000 : (gold)
- 2002 : 5th
- 2004 : (silver)
- 2006 : 5th
- 2007 : 6th
- 2009 : 6th
- 2011 : -
- 2014 : 6th
- 2015 : 7th

=== Commonwealth Games ===
- 2006: 5th

== Current roster ==
As of 2018

Barbados men's national basketball team roster
Players
Coaches

Pos.	No.	Name	Age – Date of birth	Height	Club	Ctr.
C	4	George Haynes	32 – 5 May 1986	2.06 m (6 ft 9 in)
PG	8	Zahir Motara	36 – 28 July 1981	1.79 m (5 ft 10 in)	Warrens Sports Club	(Barbados)
F	9	Justin Pile	20 – 4 December 1997	1.96 m (6 ft 5 in)	Barbados Hilton Resort Warriors	(Barbados)
G	10	Keefe Birkett	30 – 3 June 1988	1.83 m (6 ft 0 in)	Barbados Lumber Company Lakers	(Barbados)
G	11	Kelan Phillips	25 – 28 March 1993	1.83 m (6 ft 0 in)	Burger King Clapham Bulls	(Barbados)
F/C	12	Akeem Marsh	31 – 16 December 1986	2.08 m (6 ft 10 in)	Gold Coast Rollers (QBL)	(Australia)
PG	13	Andre Lockhart	32 – 11 May 1986	1.83 m (6 ft 0 in)	London Lions	(United Kingdom)
F	14	Saeed Norville	26 – 30 January 1992	2.01 m (6 ft 7 in)	Station Hill Cavaliers	(Barbados)
F	15	Mark Bridgeman	28 – 8 January 1990	1.98 m (6 ft 6 in)	Barbados Lumber Company Lakers	(Barbados)
G/F	16	Junior Moore	34 – 12 August 1983	1.99 m (6 ft 6 in)	Orange 3 Pinelands	(Barbados)
F/C	17	Charles Vanderpool	31 – 16 September 1986	2.03 m (6 ft 8 in)	Urban Vybz St.John Sonics	(Barbados)
G	18	David Gill	34 – 19 January 1984	1.83 m (6 ft 0 in)

Head coach

- (Barbados) (United Kingdom) Nigel Lloyd

Assistant coaches

- (Barbados) Derek Browne

Legend

- Club – describes last
  club before the tournament
- Age – describes age
  on 24 June 2018

=== Depth chart ===
Pos.	Starting 5	Bench 1	Bench 2
C	Akeem Marsh	George Haynes
PF	Charles Vanderpool	Justin Pile	Mark Bridgeman
SF	Saeed Norville	Junior Moore
SG	David Gill	Keefe Birkett
PG	Andre Lockhart	Zahir Motara	Kelan Phillips

== Past rosters ==
Barbados men's national basketball team roster
Players
Coaches

Pos.	No.	Name	Age – Date of birth	Height	Club
G	4	Rahim Gibbons	–	1.78 m (5 ft 10 in)	Burger King Clapham Bulls	(Barbados)
F	5	Jabar Williams	–	1.83 m (6 ft 0 in)	Jamestown Community College	(United States)
F	7	Mark Bridgeman	–	1.98 m (6 ft 6 in)	PanAm I.I.	(Barbados)
	8	Aamir Morris	–		Station Hill Cavaliers	(Barbados)
F/C	9	Charles Vanderpool	–	2.03 m (6 ft 8 in)	Orange 3 Pinelands	(Barbados)
G	10	Keefe Birkett	–	1.83 m (6 ft 0 in)	Lumber Company Lakers	(Barbados)
F	10	John Jones	? – 12 August 1992	2.06 m (6 ft 9 in)	Vikingos Tarija (Bolivia)	(Bolivia)
	11	David Gill	–			(Barbados)
F/C	12	Akeem Marsh	–	2.06 m (6 ft 9 in)	La Charite (France)	(France)
G/F	13	Junior Moore	–	1.91 m (6 ft 3 in)	Orange 3 Pinelands	(Barbados)

Head coach

- Nigel Lloyd

Assistant coach(es)

- Derek Browne

Legend

- Club – describes last
  club before the tournament

Roster
National Team at LatinBasket.com

== Head coach position ==
- (Barbados) (United Kingdom) Nigel Lloyd - 2004–2006
- (Barbados) Adrian Craigwell - 2009
- (Barbados) (United Kingdom) Nigel Lloyd - 2014–2015, 2018

== See also ==
- Barbados national under-19 basketball team
- Barbados national under-17 basketball team
- Barbados women's national basketball team
- Barbados national 3x3 team
