= Norville Carey =

British Virgin Islands basketball player

Free agent
- Position: Forward

Personal information
- Born: 3 August 1993 (age 33) Tortola, British Virgin Islands
- Listed height: 201 cm (6 ft 7 in)
- Listed weight: 103 kg (227 lb)

Career information
- High school: Red Lion Christian Academy (Bear, Delaware)
- College: Southern Miss (2012–2015); Rider (2016–2017)
- NBA draft: 2017: undrafted
- Playing career: 2017–present

Career history
- 2017–2018: New Heroes Den Bosch
- 2018: Poitiers
- 2020: Mes Kerman
- 2020–2021: Caen
- 2021–2022: Stade Rochelais

Norville Carey (born 3 August 1993) is a British Virgin Islands professional basketball player. Carey played three seasons of collegiate basketball for Southern Mississippi and one season for Rider.

== Early life ==
Born on the British Virgin Islands, Carey started playing volleyball. However, he quickly switched to basketball and when offered the opportunity he moved to the United States to play high school basketball over there.

== Professional career ==
On 21 July 2017 Carey signed with New Heroes Den Bosch of the Dutch Basketball League (DBL).
