= Antigua and Barbuda men's national basketball team =

Antigua and Barbuda
- FIBA ranking: 105 ▲15 (13 July 2026)
- Joined FIBA: 1976
- FIBA zone: FIBA Americas
- National federation: Antigua and Barbuda Amateur Basketball Association
- Coach: Ron DuBois

FIBA AmeriCup
- Appearances: None

Caribbean Championship
- Appearances: 8
- Medals: Bronze: 2002, 2004, 2015
Home	Away

The Antigua and Barbuda national basketball team represents the Antigua and Barbuda Amateur Basketball Association in international competitions.

== Current roster ==
At the 2016 Centrobasket:

Antigua and Barbuda men's national basketball team roster
Players
Coaches

Pos.	No.	Name	Age – Date of birth	Height	Club	Ctr.
G	4	Vivian Destin	29 – 5 October 1986	1.93 m (6 ft 4 in)
G	5	Kenya Achom	22 – 1 October 1993	1.85 m (6 ft 1 in)
G	6	Lennox McCoy	38 – 15 November 1977	1.87 m (6 ft 2 in)
F	7	Kareem Meade	29 – 13 May 1987	1.95 m (6 ft 5 in)
F	8	Raviel Burton	25 – 18 January 1991	1.98 m (6 ft 6 in)
F	9	Cohen De Souza	21 – 5 July 1994	2.01 m (6 ft 7 in)
C	10	Clinton Joshua	34 – 3 April 1982	2.03 m (6 ft 8 in)
F	11	Gerard Gore	26 – 24 October 1989	1.96 m (6 ft 5 in)
F	12	Jerome Richardson	32 – 26 October 1983	1.95 m (6 ft 5 in)
C	13	Sharife Sergeant	24 – 18 January 1992	2.05 m (6 ft 9 in)
C	14	Joel McIntosh	25 – 29 July 1990	2.01 m (6 ft 7 in)
C	15	Samuel Wallace Jr.	31 – 26 May 1985	2.05 m (6 ft 9 in)

Head coach

- (Antigua and Barbuda) George Hughes

Assistant coach(es)

- (Antigua and Barbuda) Bradbury Browne

Legend

- Club – describes last
  club before the tournament
- Age – describes age
  on 19 June 2016

== Past rosters ==
Roster for the 2014 CBC Championship (1–4 July 2014)

Antigua National Basketball Team roster
Players
Coaches

Pos.	No.	Name	Age – Date of birth	Height	Club
G	4	Chaz Samuel	20 – 6 March 1994	1.87 m (6 ft 2 in)	Flyers	(Antigua and Barbuda)
F	5	Kareem Meade	27 – 13 May 1987	1.95 m (6 ft 5 in)	Flyers	(Antigua and Barbuda)
SG	6	Mario Davis	34 – 14 May 1980	1.98 m (6 ft 6 in)	New Field Tapers	(Antigua and Barbuda)
PF	7	Kevin Francis	32 – 1 October 1981	2.00 m (6 ft 7 in)	Flyers	(Antigua and Barbuda)
G	8	Lennox McCoy	36 – 15 November 1977	1.87 m (6 ft 2 in)	Indios de San Francisco	(Dominican Republic)
F	9	Beijon Warrington	24 – 1 October 1989	1.95 m (6 ft 5 in)	Dowling College	(United States)
C	10	Clinton Joshua	32 – 3 April 1982	2.03 m (6 ft 8 in)	Lone Star Strikers	(United States)
SF	11	Jerome Richardson	30 – 26 October 1983	1.95 m (6 ft 5 in)	Piratas de Bogotá	(Colombia)
F	12	Neville Martin	30 – 9 February 1984	2.03 m (6 ft 8 in)	Freetown Travellers	(Antigua and Barbuda)
C	13	Kevari Francis	22 – 7 September 1991	2.01 m (6 ft 7 in)	Flyers	(Antigua and Barbuda)
F	14	Ernest Scott	31 – 28 August 1982	2.00 m (6 ft 7 in)	Wellington Saints	(New Zealand)
C	15	Sharife Sergeant	22 – 18 January 1992	2.05 m (6 ft 9 in)	Stephen F. Austin State University	(United States)

Head coach

- George Hughes

Assistant coach(es)

- Irwyn Armstrong
