= 2023 FIBA Basketball World Cup qualification (Americas) =

International basketball competition

2023 FIBA Basketball World Cup
Americas Qualification

Tournament details
- Dates: 15 April 2021 – 26 February 2023
- Teams: 23

Official website
- Americas qualifiers website Americas pre-qualifiers 2nd website Americas pre-qualifiers 1st website

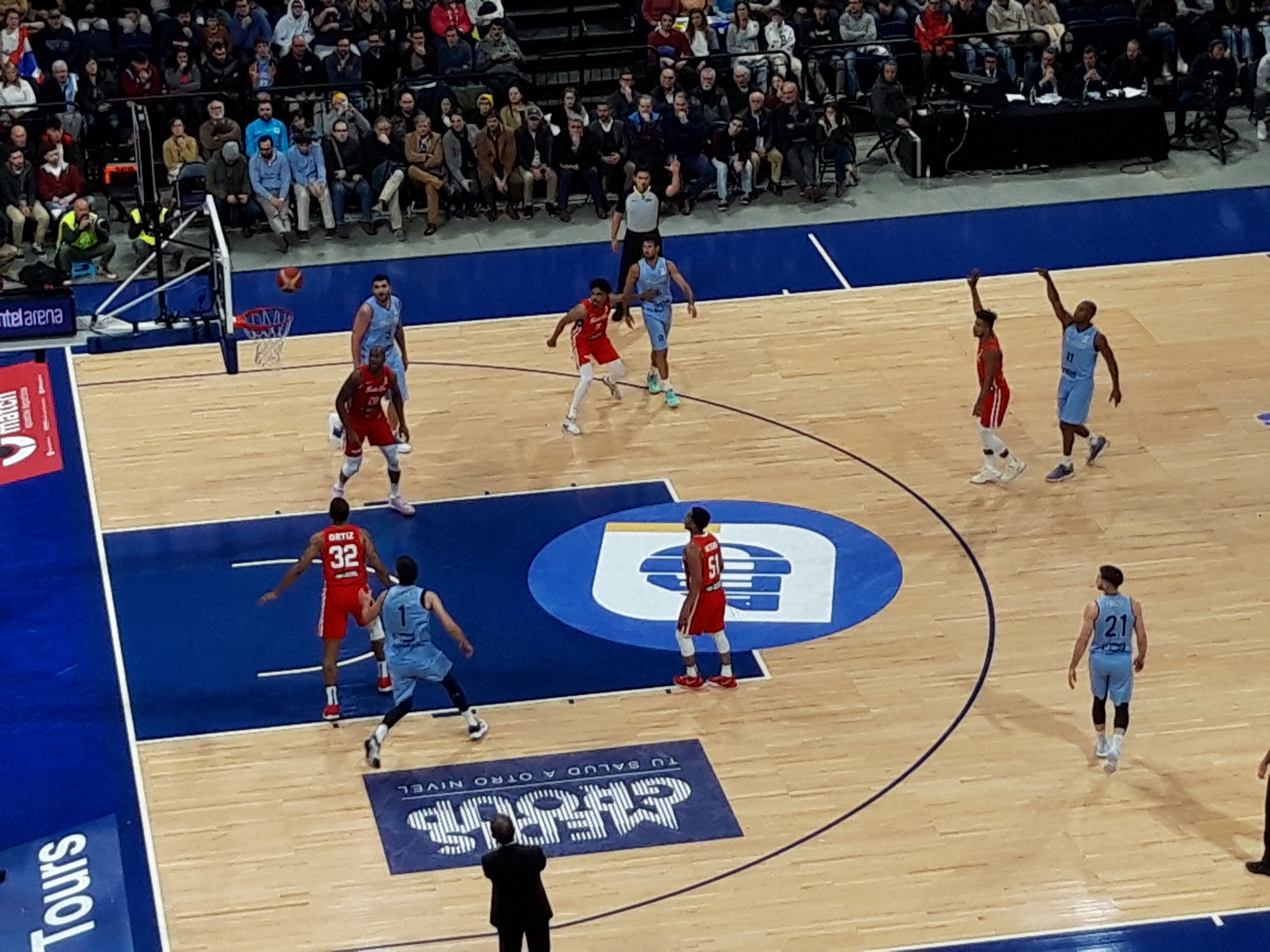
Uruguay vs Puerto Rico match

The 2023 FIBA Basketball World Cup qualification for the FIBA Americas region began in April 2021 and concluded in February 2023. The process determined the seven teams that would participate at the 2023 FIBA Basketball World Cup.

== Format ==
The qualification structure was as follows:

- Pre-Qualifiers
  - First round: Teams that did not enter the 2022 FIBA AmeriCup qualifiers were divided into two tournaments, based on geographical sub-zones. The three best placed teams from Central American and the Caribbean zone and the single winner from South American play-off advanced to the second round.
  - Second round: Four teams advanced from the sub-zone pre-qualifiers were joined by four teams eliminated from 2022 FIBA AmeriCup qualifiers. They were divided into two groups of four teams. The group winners and runners-up advanced to qualifiers.
- Qualifiers: The 12 teams that have qualified for the 2022 FIBA AmeriCup were joined by four teams advancing from the pre-qualifiers.
  - First round: The 16 teams were divided into four groups of four teams to play home-and-away matches. The three best placed teams from each group advanced to the second round.
  - Second round: The twelve teams were divided into two groups of six teams. Each group was formed from teams advanced from two first round groups. All results from the previous round were carried over. The three best placed teams from both groups plus fourth placed team with better record qualified for the World Cup.

== Entrants ==
Teams entering the Qualifiers	Teams entering the Pre-Qualifiers Second round	Teams entering the Pre-Qualifiers First round	
Teams entering the Qualifiers	Teams entering the Pre-Qualifiers Second round	Central America and Caribbean	South America
Argentina; Brazil; Canada; Colombia; Dominican Republic; Mexico; Panama; Puerto Rico; Uruguay; United States; Venezuela; Virgin Islands	Bahamas; Cuba; Chile; Paraguay	Costa Rica; Guyana; Jamaica; Nicaragua; El Salvador	Bolivia; Ecuador

== Schedule ==
Qualifiers	Round	Dates
Pre-qualifiers	First round	15–19 April 2021 (Central American and the Caribbean Sub-zone); 12–16 June 2021 (South American Sub-zone)
Pre-qualifiers	Second round	2–4 July 2021 (Group A); 13–15 July 2021 (Group B)
Qualifiers		22 November 2021 – 28 February 2023

== Pre-qualifiers ==
=== First round ===
==== Central American and Caribbean sub-zone ====
The tournament was played in single-round robin format in San Salvador. Five teams competed for three spots to the second round.

Pos	Team	Pld	W	L	PF	PA	PD	Pts	Qualification
1	Costa Rica	4	3	1	295	257	+38	7 (Note: Nicaragua 55–72 Costa Rica)	Second round
2	Nicaragua	4	3	1	320	281	+39	7	Second round
3	El Salvador (H)	4	2	2	300	323	−23	6 (Note: Jamaica 66–68 El Salvador)	Second round
4	Jamaica	4	2	2	296	314	−18	6	
5	Guyana	4	0	4	325	361	−36	4	

Source: FIBA
Rules for classification: 1) Points; 2) Head-to-head points; 3) Head-to-head point difference; 4) Head-to-head points scored; 5) Point difference.
(H) Hosts
Notes:

All times are local (UTC−6).

15 April 2021	Costa Rica	67–69	Jamaica	San Salvador, El Salvador
16:00	Scoring by quarter: 17–17, 7–24, 20–11, 23–17
	Pts: Arias 17; Rebs: Quesada 13; Asts: Conejo 5	Boxscore	Pts: Johnson 16; Rebs: Johnson, Williams 9 Asts: Thomas, Williams 4	Arena: Gimnasio Nacional José Adolfo Pineda; Attendance: 100; Referees: Roberto Mota (DOM), Carlos Vélez (COL), Mario Granados (ESA)

15 April 2021	Guyana	73–84	Nicaragua	San Salvador, El Salvador
19:00	Scoring by quarter: 14–16, 26–26, 9–21, 24–21
	Pts: Rose 20; Rebs: Moe 13; Asts: James 8	Boxscore	Pts: Ruiz 29; Rebs: Garth, Omier 10; Asts: Ruiz 6	Arena: Gimnasio Nacional José Adolfo Pineda; Referees: Leonardo Zalazar (ARG), Christian Wilmore (BAH), Orlando Varela (HON)

16 April 2021	Jamaica	107–87	Guyana	San Salvador, El Salvador
16:00	Scoring by quarter: 20–24, 27–18, 31–15, 29–30
	Pts: Johnson 26; Rebs: Williams 12; Asts: Bailey 9	Boxscore	Pts: Moe 25; Rebs: Rose 8 Asts: James, Welch 5	Arena: Gimnasio Nacional José Adolfo Pineda; Attendance: 100; Referees: Leonardo Zalazar (ARG), Jesed Díaz (PUR), Christian Wilmore (BAH)

16 April 2021	El Salvador	58–78	Costa Rica	San Salvador
19:00	Scoring by quarter: 15–20, 9–11, 11–24, 23–23
	Pts: Martínez 26; Rebs: Aguilar 15; Asts: C. Arias 3	Boxscore	Pts: Arias 15; Rebs: Arias 9 Asts: Conejo 5	Arena: Gimnasio Nacional José Adolfo Pineda; Referees: Roberto Mota (DOM), Carlos Vélez (COL), Kristian Paez (ECU)

17 April 2021	Nicaragua	92–54	Jamaica	San Salvador, El Salvador
16:00	Scoring by quarter: 27–11, 22–10, 12–14, 31–19
	Pts: Ruiz 26; Rebs: Omier 13; Asts: Ruiz 5	Boxscore	Pts: Williams 24; Rebs: Williams 9 Asts: Whittingham 3	Arena: Gimnasio Nacional José Adolfo Pineda; Attendance: 100; Referees: Leonardo Zalazar (ARG), Carlos Vélez (COL), Mario Granados (ESA)

17 April 2021	Guyana	90–92	El Salvador	San Salvador
19:00	Scoring by quarter: 24–26, 29–27, 27–14, 10–25
	Pts: James 27; Rebs: Rose 10; Asts: James 5	Boxscore	Pts: Aguilar 35; Rebs: Aguilar 16; Asts: three players 4	Arena: Gimnasio Nacional José Adolfo Pineda; Attendance: 100; Referees: Jesed Díaz (PUR), Kristian Paez (ECU), Orlando Varela (HON)

18 April 2021	Costa Rica	78–75	Guyana	San Salvador, El Salvador
16:00	Scoring by quarter: 20–20, 19–21, 27–15, 12–19
	Pts: Shedden 19; Rebs: Arias 9 Asts: Arias, Conejo 5	Boxscore	Pts: James 29; Rebs: James 12; Asts: Bovell, James 5	Arena: Gimnasio Nacional José Adolfo Pineda; Referees: Leonardo Zalazar (ARG), Roberto Mota (DOM), Christian Wilmore (BAH)

18 April 2021	El Salvador	82–89	Nicaragua	San Salvador
19:00	Scoring by quarter: 26–14, 29–23, 12–20, 15–32
	Pts: Martínez 25; Rebs: C. Arias 9 Asts: A. Arias 7	Boxscore	Pts: Ruiz 25; Rebs: Omier 16; Asts: Ruiz 8	Arena: Gimnasio Nacional José Adolfo Pineda; Referees: Jesed Díaz (PUR), Kristian Paez (ECU), Orlando Varela (HON)

19 April 2021	Nicaragua	55–72	Costa Rica	San Salvador, El Salvador
16:00	Scoring by quarter: 12–18, 21–14, 14–15, 8–25
	Pts: Thomas 14; Rebs: Pérez 13; Asts: Garth, Pauth 3	Boxscore	Pts: Shedden 18; Rebs: Arias 13; Asts: Alvarado 5	Arena: Gimnasio Nacional José Adolfo Pineda; Attendance: 100; Referees: Leonardo Zalazar (ARG), Roberto Mota (DOM), Mario Granados (ESA)

19 April 2021	Jamaica	66–68	El Salvador	San Salvador
19:00	Scoring by quarter: 18–15, 18–21, 13–16, 17–16
	Pts: Johnson 18; Rebs: Williams 10; Asts: three players 4	Boxscore	Pts: Martínez 19; Rebs: C. Arias 12; Asts: Martínez 5	Arena: Gimnasio Nacional José Adolfo Pineda; Referees: Jesed Díaz (PUR), Carlos Vélez (COL), Christian Wilmore (BAH)

==== South American sub-zone ====
Only two teams contested in the South American pre-qualifiers. They played home-and-away match tie with a winner qualify for the second round of pre-qualifiers.

All times are local.

Team 1	Agg.	Team 2	1st leg	2nd leg
Bolivia	142–126	Ecuador	91–57	51–69

12 June 2021	Bolivia	91–57	Ecuador	Tarija
20:00	Scoring by quarter: 15–22, 20–9, 33–16, 23–10
		Boxscore		Arena: Coliseo de Basquetbol Guadalquivir; Attendance: 2,500; Referees: Omar Bermúdez (MEX), Carlos Vélez (COL), Rodrigo Mejía (COL)

16 June 2021	Ecuador	69–51	Bolivia	Guayaquil
20:00	Scoring by quarter: 17–10, 21–8, 11–17, 20–16
	Pts: Riascos 22; Rebs: three players 6 Asts: Riascos 5	Boxscore	Pts: Choque 23; Rebs: Camargo 7 Asts: Ochoa 3	Arena: Coliseo Voltaire Paladines Polo; Referees: Leonardo Zalazar (ARG), Felipe Valenzuela (CHI), Nicolás Flores (PAR)

=== Second round ===
Two groups were played as single round-robin tournaments.

==== Group A ====
Group A was played in San Salvador from 2 to 4 July 2021.

Pos	Team	Pld	W	L	PF	PA	PD	Pts	Qualification
1	Bahamas	3	3	0	251	218	+33	6	Qualifiers
2	Cuba	3	2	1	253	219	+34	5	Qualifiers
3	Costa Rica	3	1	2	182	213	−31	4	
4	El Salvador (H)	3	0	3	208	244	−36	3	

Source: FIBA
(H) Hosts

All times are local (UTC−6).

2 July 2021	Cuba	88–89	Bahamas	San Salvador, El Salvador
16:30	Scoring by quarter: 21–19, 28–16, 27–23, 12–31
	Pts: Rivero 35; Rebs: Rivero 13; Asts: Miller Jr. 9	Boxscore	Pts: Munnings 18; Rebs: Munnings 8 Asts: Oliva 6	Arena: Gimnasio Nacional José Adolfo Pineda; Referees: Jesed Díaz (PUR), Allan Mercado (NCA), Claudio Osorio (CHI)

2 July 2021	Costa Rica	71–59	El Salvador	San Salvador
19:30	Scoring by quarter: 22–11, 20–23, 14–17, 15–8
	Pts: Alvarado 19; Rebs: Quesada 10; Asts: Conejo 10	Boxscore	Pts: Aguilar, Martínez 10; Rebs: C. Arias 12; Asts: A. Arias, Lahud 3	Arena: Gimnasio Nacional José Adolfo Pineda; Referees: Marcos Benito (BRA), Maximo Cruz (DOM), Yezid Carreno (COL)

3 July 2021	Bahamas	75–51	Costa Rica	San Salvador, El Salvador
16:30	Scoring by quarter: 17–8, 25–9, 19–15, 14–19
	Pts: Miller Jr. 11; Rebs: Mackey 9 Asts: Miller 6	Boxscore	Pts: Shedden 14; Rebs: Anderson 10; Asts: Lynch 3	Arena: Gimnasio Nacional José Adolfo Pineda; Referees: Jesed Díaz (PUR), Nicolás Flores (PAR), Yezid Carreno (COL)

3 July 2021	El Salvador	70–86	Cuba	San Salvador
19:30	Scoring by quarter: 13–22, 17–18, 27–18, 13–28
	Pts: Martínez 28; Rebs: Aguilar 12; Asts: A. Arias, Martínez 4	Boxscore	Pts: Rivero 27; Rebs: Cubilla 15; Asts: Guzmán 8	Arena: Gimnasio Nacional José Adolfo Pineda; Referees: Marcos Benito (BRA), Allan Mercado (NCA), Claudio Osorio (CHI)

4 July 2021	Costa Rica	60–79	Cuba	San Salvador, El Salvador
16:30	Scoring by quarter: 6–14, 11–24, 24–11, 17–30
	Pts: Alvarado 19; Rebs: Conejo 7 Asts: Conejo 8	Boxscore	Pts: Guzmán 25; Rebs: Guzmán 13; Asts: Guzmán 6	Arena: Gimnasio Nacional José Adolfo Pineda; Referees: Marcos Benito (BRA), Nicolás Flores (PAR), Claudio Osorio (CHI)

4 July 2021	Bahamas	87–79	El Salvador	San Salvador, El Salvador
19:30	Scoring by quarter: 21–20, 30–14, 17–24, 19–21
	Pts: Clarke, Munnings 18; Rebs: Thompson 8 Asts: Munnings 5	Boxscore	Pts: García 25; Rebs: García 13; Asts: Lahud 5	Arena: Gimnasio Nacional José Adolfo Pineda; Referees: Jesed Díaz (PUR), Maximo Cruz (DOM), Yezid Carreno (COL)

==== Group B ====
Group B was played in Santiago, Chile from 13 to 15 July 2021.

Pos	Team	Pld	W	L	PF	PA	PD	Pts	Qualification
1	Chile (H)	3	3	0	253	177	+76	6	Qualifiers
2	Paraguay	3	1	2	212	191	+21	4 (Note: Paraguay 3 Pts, +25 PD; Nicaragua 3 Pts, −2 PD, Bolivia 3 Pts, −23 PD)	Qualifiers
3	Nicaragua	3	1	2	221	242	−21	4	
4	Bolivia	3	1	2	188	264	−76	4	

Source: FIBA
(H) Hosts
Notes:

All times are local (UTC−3).

13 July 2021	Nicaragua	76–73	Paraguay	Santiago, Chile
19:00	Scoring by quarter: 17–24, 21–12, 16–16, 22–21
	Pts: Ruiz 23; Rebs: Omier 13; Asts: Cacho 5	Boxscore	Pts: Peralta 15; Rebs: Riveros 9 Asts: Riveros 7	Arena: Centro Nacional de Entrenamiento Olímpico; Referees: Andrés Bartel (URU), Alberto Achutegui (MEX), Ramiro Inchauspe (BRA)

13 July 2021	Chile	105–52	Bolivia	Santiago
22:15	Scoring by quarter: 20–9, 26–21, 22–13, 37–9
	Pts: S. Suárez 16; Rebs: Herrera 8 Asts: Lauler 5	Boxscore	Pts: Reaves 18; Rebs: Arze 6 Asts: three players 2	Arena: Centro Nacional de Entrenamiento Olímpico; Referees: Gonzalo Salgueiro (URU), Johnny Batista (PUR), Bruno Oliveira (BRA)

14 July 2021	Bolivia	87–82	Nicaragua	Santiago, Chile
19:00	Scoring by quarter: 25–15, 23–26, 16–13, 23–28
	Pts: Reaves 21; Rebs: Calvo, Reaves 9 Asts: Reaves 7	Boxscore	Pts: Garth 18; Rebs: Omier 12; Asts: Ruiz 7	Arena: Centro Nacional de Entrenamiento Olímpico; Referees: Johnny Batista (PUR), Carlos Vélez (COL), Diego Chiconato (BRA)

14 July 2021	Paraguay	62–66	Chile	Santiago, Chile
22:15	Scoring by quarter: 13–18, 10–15, 18–17, 21–16
	Pts: Bareiro 10; Rebs: Poisson 8 Asts: Poisson 4	Boxscore	Pts: S. Suárez 22; Rebs: Haase 11; Asts: Herrera 5	Arena: Centro Nacional de Entrenamiento Olímpico; Referees: Andrés Bartel (URU), Gonzalo Salgueiro (URU), Bruno Da Costa (BRA)

15 July 2021	Bolivia	49–77	Paraguay	Santiago, Chile
19:00	Scoring by quarter: 9–21, 15–17, 11–15, 14–24
	Pts: Calvo, Veizaga 9 Rebs: Calvo 8 Asts: Arze, Camargo 2	Boxscore	Pts: Riveros 17; Rebs: Zanotti 8 Asts: three players 3	Arena: Centro Nacional de Entrenamiento Olímpico; Referees: Andrés Bartel (URU), Carlos Vélez (COL), Ramiro Marques (BRA)

15 July 2021	Nicaragua	63–82	Chile	Santiago, Chile
22:15	Scoring by quarter: 18–22, 10–18, 15–23, 20–19
	Pts: Omier 18; Rebs: Omier 18; Asts: Ponce 5	Boxscore	Pts: Herrera 16; Rebs: Lorca, M. Súarez 8 Asts: Arroyo 5	Arena: Centro Nacional de Entrenamiento Olímpico; Referees: Johnny Batista (PUR), Diego Chiconato (BRA), Bruno Da Costa (BRA)

== Qualifiers ==
=== Qualified teams ===
Qualification method	Team(s)
2022 FIBA AmeriCup participation	Argentina; Brazil; Canada; Colombia; Dominican Republic; Mexico; Panama; Puerto Rico; Uruguay; United States; Venezuela; Virgin Islands
Qualified from pre-qualifiers	Bahamas; Chile; Cuba; Paraguay

=== Draw ===
The draw was held on 31 August 2021 in Mies, Switzerland.

==== Seeding ====
Seedings were announced on 30 August 2021. Teams were seeded based on geographical principles and FIBA rankings. Teams from pots 1, 3, 5, and 7 were drawn to Groups A and B, while teams from pots 2, 4, 6, and 8 were drawn to Groups C and D.

Pot 1
Team	Pos
Argentina	7
Brazil	15

Pot 5
Team	Pos
Panama	48
Colombia	66

Pot 2
Team	Pos
United States	1
Canada	18

Pot 6
Team	Pos
Mexico	24
Virgin Islands	52

Pot 3
Team	Pos
Venezuela	17
Uruguay	40

Pot 7
Team	Pos
Chile	67
Paraguay	73

Pot 4
Team	Pos
Puerto Rico	19
Dominican Republic	20

Pot 8
Team	Pos
Bahamas	59
Cuba	64

=== First round ===
Due to the COVID-19 pandemic, the November window was played in a single venue. The same was one for the February window for Groups A and C. For the third window, all groups returned to the normal home/away format.

All times are local.

==== Group A ====
Pos	Team	Pld	W	L	PF	PA	PD	Pts	Qualification
1	Venezuela	6	5	1	469	343	+126	11 (Note: Venezuela 137–127 Argentina)	Second round
2	Argentina	6	5	1	455	382	+73	11	Second round
3	Panama	6	2	4	406	414	−8	8	Second round
4	Paraguay	6	0	6	330	521	−191	6	

Source: FIBA
Rules for classification: 1) Points; 2) Head-to-head results; 3) Points difference; 4) Points scored.
Notes:

26 November 2021	Venezuela	77–56	Panama	Buenos Aires, Argentina
12:10	Scoring by quarter: 25–18, 22–11, 15–13, 15–14
	Pts: Cubillán 14; Rebs: Sojo 7 Asts: Cubillán, Sojo 4	Boxscore	Pts: Oglivie 20; Rebs: Blenman 7 Asts: Gaskins 4	Arena: Estadio Obras Sanitarias; Attendance: 300; Referees: Roberto Vázquez (PUR), Andreia Silva (BRA), Felipe Valenzuela (CHI)

26 November 2021	Argentina	93–67	Paraguay	Buenos Aires
21:10	Scoring by quarter: 24–19, 24–16, 19–16, 26–18
	Pts: Delfino 21; Rebs: Barreiro 9 Asts: Delfino 6	Boxscore	Pts: Peralta 17; Rebs: López 5 Asts: Riveros 5	Arena: Estadio Obras Sanitarias; Attendance: 1,250; Referees: Andrés Bartel (URU), Grant Todey (USA), Alan dos Santos (BRA)

27 November 2021	Panama	53–71	Venezuela	Buenos Aires, Argentina
12:10	Scoring by quarter: 9–21, 15–15, 13–18, 16–17
	Pts: Oglivie 15; Rebs: three players 4 Asts: Luzcando, Oglivie 3	Boxscore	Pts: Chourio 13; Rebs: Colmenares 10; Asts: Cubillán 3	Arena: Estadio Obras Sanitarias; Attendance: 1,200; Referees: Andrés Bartel (URU), Grant Todey (USA), Sebastián Negron (CHI)

27 November 2021	Paraguay	43–82	Argentina	Buenos Aires, Argentina
22:10	Scoring by quarter: 11–16, 12–26, 9–15, 11–25
	Pts: Sánchez 16; Rebs: Peralta 6 Asts: Peralta 3	Boxscore	Pts: Romano 18; Rebs: Fernández 10; Asts: Delfino 5	Arena: Estadio Obras Sanitarias; Attendance: 2,500; Referees: Roberto Vázquez (PUR), Andreia Silva (BRA), Felipe Valenzuela (CHI)

25 February 2022	Paraguay	59–81	Panama	Buenos Aires, Argentina
18:40	Scoring by quarter: 19–13, 14–26, 13–16, 13–26
	Pts: Riveros 16; Rebs: Orchipinti 6 Asts: three players 2	Boxscore	Pts: Gaskins, Oglivie 15; Rebs: Romero 7 Asts: Luzcando 7	Arena: Estadio Obras Sanitarias; Attendance: 200; Referees: Carlos Peralta (ECU), Fabiano Huber (BRA), Claudio Osorio (CHI)

25 February 2022	Argentina	58–71	Venezuela	Buenos Aires
21:40	Scoring by quarter: 17–27, 17–19, 15–15, 9–10
	Pts: Brussino 16; Rebs: Vildoza 8 Asts: Brussino 3	Boxscore	Pts: Colmenares 17; Rebs: Colmenares 8 Asts: Cubillán 4	Arena: Estadio Obras Sanitarias; Attendance: 4,000; Referees: Jorge Vázquez (PUR), Felipe Ibarra (CHI), Fernando Leite (BRA)

26 February 2022	Paraguay	48–97	Venezuela	Buenos Aires, Argentina
18:10	Scoring by quarter: 9–21, 13–31, 10–21, 16–24
	Pts: Dose, Ljubetic 11; Rebs: Orchipinti 6 Asts: Riveros 4	Boxscore	Pts: Zamora 24; Rebs: Ruiz 10; Asts: three players 3	Arena: Estadio Obras Sanitarias; Attendance: 300; Referees: Jorge Vázquez (PUR), Felipe Ibarra (CHI), Fabiano Huber (BRA)

26 February 2022	Argentina	65–58	Panama	Buenos Aires
21:10	Scoring by quarter: 19–14, 14–20, 16–17, 16–7
	Pts: Delfino 15; Rebs: Delfino 9 Asts: Aguirre 4	Boxscore	Pts: Oglivie 17; Rebs: Oglivie 10; Asts: four players 2	Arena: Estadio Obras Sanitarias; Attendance: 4,000; Referees: Carlos Peralta (ECU), Gonzalo Salgueiro (URU), Fernando Leite (BRA)

30 June 2022	Panama	81–54	Paraguay	Panama City
10:10	Scoring by quarter: 22–18, 28–7, 18–11, 13–18
	Pts: Gaskins 17; Rebs: Oglivie 11; Asts: Gaskins 6	Boxscore	Pts: Dose 12; Rebs: Dose 7 Asts: Martínez, Riveros 3	Arena: Roberto Durán Arena; Referees: Alexis Mercado (PUR), Maripier Malo (CAN), Jayson Stiell (CAN)

30 June 2022	Venezuela	66–69	Argentina	Puerto la Cruz
19:10	Scoring by quarter: 22–16, 20–15, 11–12, 13–26
	Pts: Zamora 15; Rebs: Colmenares 8 Asts: Cubillán 5	Boxscore	Pts: Campazzo 29; Rebs: Delía 8 Asts: Bolmaro 5	Arena: Gimnasio Luis Ramos; Attendance: 5,000; Referees: Michael Weiland (CAN), Omar Bermúdez (MEX), Andrés Bartel (URU)

3 July 2022	Panama	77–88	Argentina	Panama City
17:10	Scoring by quarter: 23–23, 15–31, 23–26, 16–8
	Pts: Gaskins 23; Rebs: Romero 6 Asts: Gaskins 5	Boxscore	Pts: Brussino 24; Rebs: Delfino 9 Asts: Campazzo 8	Arena: Roberto Durán Arena; Attendance: 10,000; Referees: Guilherme Locatelli (BRA), Roberto Vázquez (PUR), Grant Todey (USA)

3 July 2022	Venezuela	87–59	Paraguay	Puerto la Cruz
17:10	Scoring by quarter: 20–13, 16–11, 29–22, 22–13
	Pts: Zamora 24; Rebs: Colmenares 9 Asts: Cubillán 7	Boxscore	Pts: Peralta 17; Rebs: Martínez, Sequera 5 Asts: Martínez 3	Arena: Gimnasio Luis Ramos; Attendance: 4,185; Referees: Hortencia Sánchez (MEX), Diego Chiconato (BRA), Alan dos Santos (BRA)

==== Group B ====
Pos	Team	Pld	W	L	PF	PA	PD	Pts	Qualification
1	Brazil	6	5	1	533	411	+122	11	Second round
2	Uruguay	6	4	2	444	434	+10	10	Second round
3	Colombia	6	2	4	464	538	−74	8	Second round
4	Chile	6	1	5	396	454	−58	7	

Source: FIBA
Rules for classification: 1) Points; 2) Head-to-head results; 3) Points difference; 4) Points scored.

26 November 2021	Uruguay	83–75	Colombia	Buenos Aires, Argentina
15:10	Scoring by quarter: 21–13, 28–28, 18–22, 16–12
	Pts: Fitipaldo 31; Rebs: Mezger 9 Asts: Fitipaldo, Vidal 3	Boxscore	Pts: Angola 37; Rebs: Ibargüen 8 Asts: Atencia 6	Arena: Estadio Obras Sanitarias; Attendance: 100; Referees: Jesed Díaz (PUR), Nicolás Flores (PAR), Johnny Batista (PUR)

26 November 2021	Brazil	77–53	Chile	Buenos Aires, Argentina
18:10	Scoring by quarter: 22–21, 19–14, 15–8, 21–10
	Pts: Mariano 18; Rebs: Caboclo 13; Asts: Dos Santos 9	Boxscore	Pts: Arroyo, M. Suárez 11; Rebs: three players 4 Asts: Arroyo 3	Arena: Estadio Obras Sanitarias; Attendance: 200; Referees: Omar Bermúdez (MEX), Kristian Paez (ECU), Micaela Prado (ARG)

27 November 2021	Colombia	69–82	Uruguay	Buenos Aires, Argentina
15:10	Scoring by quarter: 18–16, 21–18, 9–17, 21–31
	Pts: Atencia 22; Rebs: three players 6 Asts: Angola 3	Boxscore	Pts: Fitipaldo 13; Rebs: Wachsmann 10; Asts: Ubal 6	Arena: Estadio Obras Sanitarias; Attendance: 200; Referees: Omar Bermúdez (MEX), Kristian Paez (ECU), Danilo Molina (ARG)

27 November 2021	Chile	55–81	Brazil	Buenos Aires, Argentina
19:10	Scoring by quarter: 17–18, 11–17, 15–23, 12–23
	Pts: M. Suárez 17; Rebs: M. Suárez, S. Suárez 8 Asts: Pickett 3	Boxscore	Pts: Mariano 17; Rebs: Galvanini 9 Asts: De Paula 5	Arena: Estadio Obras Sanitarias; Attendance: 500; Referees: Jesed Díaz (PUR), Nicolás Flores (PAR), Johnny Batista (PUR)

25 February 2022	Brazil	85–66	Uruguay	Franca
19:10	Scoring by quarter: 14–14, 23–18, 18–11, 30–23
	Pts: Benite, Meindl 13; Rebs: Caboclo, Lima 7 Asts: Dos Santos 7	Boxscore	Pts: Parodi 12; Rebs: Rojas 7 Asts: Batista 4	Arena: Ginásio Poliesportivo Pedro Morilla Fuentes; Attendance: 1,023; Referees: Roberto Vázquez (PUR), Daniel García (VEN), Danilo Molina (ARG)

25 February 2022	Chile	90–76	Colombia	Valdivia
21:40	Scoring by quarter: 22–12, 13–17, 29–25, 26–22
	Pts: Herrera 20; Rebs: Arroyo, S. Suárez 7 Asts: Arroyo 8	Boxscore	Pts: Roque 23; Rebs: Trocha 9 Asts: three players 2	Arena: Coliseo Municipal Antonio Azurmendy Riveros; Attendance: 0 Referees: Juan Fernández (ARG), Alexis Mercado (PUR), Franco Ronconi (ARG)

28 February 2022	Brazil	119–73	Colombia	Franca
20:00	Scoring by quarter: 25–21, 32–15, 27–20, 35–17
	Pts: Benite 21; Rebs: Lima 9 Asts: Corazza, Dos Santos 8	Boxscore	Pts: Trocha 21; Rebs: Trocha 6 Asts: Mejia 3	Arena: Ginásio Poliesportivo Pedro Morilla Fuentes; Attendance: 1,207; Referees: Roberto Vázquez (PUR), Daniel García (VEN), Jesús López (VEN)

28 February 2022	Chile	67–78	Uruguay	Valdivia
22:10	Scoring by quarter: 14–23, 22–22, 15–14, 16–19
	Pts: Morales 26; Rebs: Morales 8 Asts: Morales 3	Boxscore	Pts: Ubal 15; Rebs: Batista 8 Asts: Parodi 5	Arena: Coliseo Municipal Antonio Azurmendy Riveros; Referees: Juan Fernández (ARG), Alexis Mercado (PUR), Krishna Domínguez (MEX)

30 June 2022	Uruguay	60–73	Brazil	Montevideo
20:10	Scoring by quarter: 12–24, 20–19, 10–19, 18–11
	Pts: Granger 20; Rebs: Granger, Wachsmann 5 Asts: Fitipaldo 4	Boxscore	Pts: Mineiro 15; Rebs: Dias 10; Asts: Dias 6	Arena: Antel Arena; Attendance: 7,500; Referees: Jesed Díaz (PUR), Danilo Molina (ARG), Edwin Quiles (PUR)

30 June 2022	Colombia	67–66	Chile	Barranquilla
20:40	Scoring by quarter: 17–16, 16–19, 16–21, 18–10
	Pts: Ibargüen 21; Rebs: Jackson 11; Asts: Angola 4	Boxscore	Pts: S. Suárez 18; Rebs: M. Suárez 8 Asts: Morales 4	Arena: Coliseo Elías Chegwin; Referees: Jorge Vázquez (PUR), Kristian Paez (ECU), Orlando Varela (HON)

3 July 2022	Colombia	104–98(2OT)	Brazil	Barranquilla
19:40	Scoring by quarter: 27–19, 21–18, 17–18, 11–21, Overtime: 11–11, 17–11
	Pts: Tello Palacios 26; Rebs: Ibargüen 12; Asts: Angola, Tello Palacios 5	Boxscore	Pts: Huertas 27; Rebs: Dias 14; Asts: Luz 5	Arena: Coliseo Elías Chegwin; Attendance: 2,000; Referees: Omar Bermúdez (MEX), Michael Scott (CAN), Maripier Malo (CAN)

3 July 2022	Uruguay	75–65	Chile	Montevideo
20:40	Scoring by quarter: 26–18, 15–16, 22–11, 12–20
	Pts: Fitipaldo 14; Rebs: Wachsmann 9 Asts: Parodi 8	Boxscore	Pts: M. Suárez 18; Rebs: Haase, S. Suárez 6 Asts: Morales 6	Arena: Antel Arena; Attendance: 5,900; Referees: Alexis Mercado (PUR), Nicolás Flores (PAR), Edwin Quiles (PUR)

==== Group C ====
Pos	Team	Pld	W	L	PF	PA	PD	Pts	Qualification
1	Canada	6	6	0	615	417	+198	12	Second round
2	Dominican Republic	6	4	2	519	446	+73	10	Second round
3	Bahamas	6	2	4	478	560	−82	8	Second round
4	Virgin Islands	6	0	6	388	577	−189	6	

Source: FIBA
Rules for classification: 1) Points; 2) Head-to-head results; 3) Points difference; 4) Points scored.

28 November 2021	Canada	115–73	Bahamas	Santo Domingo, Dominican Republic
17:00	Scoring by quarter: 32–22, 29–16, 31–13, 23–22
	Pts: Wiltjer 23; Rebs: Alexander 12; Asts: Scrubb 11	Boxscore	Pts: Bridgewater 13; Rebs: four players 5 Asts: Carey, Munnings 5	Arena: Palacio de los Deportes Virgilio Travieso Soto; Referees: Jorge Vázquez (PUR), Carlos Peralta (ECU), Krishna Domínguez (MEX)

28 November 2021	Dominican Republic	87–65	Virgin Islands	Santo Domingo
20:00	Scoring by quarter: 20–13, 28–14, 26–19, 13–19
	Pts: Liz 15; Rebs: Rodríguez 12; Asts: Henríquez 5	Boxscore	Pts: Aska, Christmas 13; Rebs: Christmas 10; Asts: Milligan 4	Arena: Palacio de los Deportes Virgilio Travieso Soto; Attendance: 1,500; Referees: Julio Anaya (PAN), Felipe Ibarra (CHI), Diego Chiconato (BRA)

29 November 2021	Bahamas	77–113	Canada	Santo Domingo, Dominican Republic
17:00	Scoring by quarter: 26–34, 20–24, 13–25, 18–30
	Pts: Nesbitt 18; Rebs: Munnings 8 Asts: Munnings 6	Boxscore	Pts: Wiltjer 25; Rebs: Bennett, Scrubb 8 Asts: Chery 7	Arena: Palacio de los Deportes Virgilio Travieso Soto; Referees: Julio Anaya (PAN), Felipe Ibarra (CHI), Norval Young (ISV)

29 November 2021	Virgin Islands	56–100	Dominican Republic	Santo Domingo, Dominican Republic
20:00	Scoring by quarter: 18–29, 13–17, 12–24, 13–30
	Pts: Samuel 13; Rebs: Hansen 11; Asts: Milligan 5	Boxscore	Pts: Liz 23; Rebs: Vargas 15; Asts: Solano 6	Arena: Palacio de los Deportes Virgilio Travieso Soto; Attendance: 1,000; Referees: Jorge Vázquez (PUR), Carlos Peralta (ECU), Orlando Varela (HON)

26 February 2022	Bahamas	86–74	Virgin Islands	Santo Domingo, Dominican Republic
15:00	Scoring by quarter: 19–15, 19–16, 24–21, 24–22
	Pts: Mackey Jr. 25; Rebs: Mackey Jr. 10; Asts: Munnings 11	Boxscore	Pts: Samuel 24; Rebs: Smith 8 Asts: Richards 7	Arena: Palacio de los Deportes Virgilio Travieso Soto; Attendance: 509; Referees: Marcos Benito (BRA), Grant Todey (USA), Kristian Paez (ECU)

26 February 2022	Canada	85–79	Dominican Republic	Santo Domingo, Dominican Republic
18:00	Scoring by quarter: 22–20, 20–16, 22–20, 21–23
	Pts: Wiltjer 15; Rebs: T. Scrubb 7 Asts: P. Scrubb 4	Boxscore	Pts: Liz 29; Rebs: Delgado 13; Asts: Solano 4	Arena: Palacio de los Deportes Virgilio Travieso Soto; Attendance: 2,000; Referees: Jesed Díaz (PUR), Jenna Reneau (USA), Johnny Batista (PUR)

27 February 2022	Canada	94–46	Virgin Islands	Santo Domingo, Dominican Republic
15:00	Scoring by quarter: 27–14, 16–7, 22–9, 29–16
	Pts: Wiltjer 24; Rebs: Young 9 Asts: Bell-Haynes, Kajami-Keane 6	Boxscore	Pts: Christmas 15; Rebs: Christmas 10; Asts: Francis 4	Arena: Palacio de los Deportes Virgilio Travieso Soto; Attendance: 500; Referees: Jesed Díaz (PUR), Jenna Reneau (USA), Johnny Batista (PUR)

27 February 2022	Bahamas	65–90	Dominican Republic	Santo Domingo, Dominican Republic
18:00	Scoring by quarter: 24–19, 9–24, 12–21, 20–26
	Pts: Munnings 16; Rebs: Munnings 9 Asts: Munnings 6	Boxscore	Pts: Feliz 25; Rebs: Delgado 16; Asts: Solano 5	Arena: Palacio de los Deportes Virgilio Travieso Soto; Attendance: 1,500; Referees: Marcos Benito (BRA), Grant Todey (USA), Carlos Vélez (COL)

1 July 2022	Virgin Islands	80–97	Bahamas	Saint Thomas
19:00	Scoring by quarter: 24–24, 15–28, 23–25, 18–20
	Pts: Hodge 18; Rebs: Milligan 10; Asts: Hodge 5	Boxscore	Pts: Hield 24; Rebs: Thompson 6 Asts: Hield, Miller Jr. 5	Arena: Sports and Fitness Center; Referees: Marcos Benito (BRA), Krishna Domínguez (MEX), José Fernández (CRC)

1 July 2022	Dominican Republic	75–95	Canada	Hamilton, Canada
19:00	Scoring by quarter: 16–21, 20–25, 12–30, 27–19
	Pts: Henríquez 14; Rebs: Delgado 10; Asts: Solano 5	Boxscore	Pts: Gilgeous-Alexander 32; Rebs: Olynyk 11; Asts: Olynyk 6	Arena: FirstOntario Centre; Attendance: 5,312; Referees: Roberto Vázquez (PUR), Hortencia Sánchez (MEX), Diego Chiconato (BRA)

4 July 2022	Virgin Islands	67–113	Canada	Saint Thomas
17:00	Scoring by quarter: 8–28, 13–24, 27–37, 19–24
	Pts: Smith 14; Rebs: Aska, Jules 6 Asts: Richards 3	Boxscore	Pts: Gilgeous-Alexander, Robertson 24; Rebs: three players 6 Asts: Alexander-Walker 7	Arena: Sports and Fitness Center; Referees: Carlos Peralta (ECU), Krishna Domínguez (MEX), Yezid Carreño (COL)

4 July 2022	Dominican Republic	88–80	Bahamas	Nassau, Bahamas
19:00	Scoring by quarter: 26–17, 20–16, 24–21, 18–26
	Pts: Liz 26; Rebs: Delgado 11; Asts: Mendoza 7	Boxscore	Pts: Hield 29; Rebs: three players 5 Asts: Hield 8	Arena: Kendall Isaacs Gymnasium; Attendance: 1,200; Referees: Jorge Vázquez (PUR), Andrés Bartel (URU), Orlando Varela (HON)

==== Group D ====
Pos	Team	Pld	W	L	PF	PA	PD	Pts	Qualification
1	United States	6	5	1	535	469	+66	11	Second round
2	Mexico	6	4	2	498	498	0	10	Second round
3	Puerto Rico	6	3	3	468	475	−7	9	Second round
4	Cuba	6	0	6	414	473	−59	6	

Source: FIBA
Rules for classification: 1) Points; 2) Head-to-head results; 3) Points difference; 4) Points scored.

28 November 2021	United States	95–90	Cuba	Chihuahua City, Mexico
15:30	Scoring by quarter: 27–37, 33–16, 13–24, 22–13
	Pts: Thomas 21; Rebs: Bowen 9 Asts: Simpson 6	Boxscore	Pts: Rivero 34; Rebs: Rivero 9 Asts: Guzmán 6	Arena: Gimnasio Manuel Bernardo Aguirre; Attendance: 500; Referees: Daniel García (VEN), Marcos Benito (BRA), José Fernández (CRC)

28 November 2021	Mexico	90–86	Puerto Rico	Chihuahua City
19:00	Scoring by quarter: 27–23, 19–25, 22–18, 22–20
	Pts: Girón 21; Rebs: Jaimes 12; Asts: Stoll 14	Boxscore	Pts: De Jesús 24; Rebs: Collier 7 Asts: De Jesús 6	Arena: Gimnasio Manuel Bernardo Aguirre; Attendance: 1,000; Referees: Juan Fernández (ARG), Carlos Vélez (COL), Fabiano Huber (BRA)

29 November 2021	Puerto Rico	69–60	Cuba	Chihuahua City, Mexico
15:30	Scoring by quarter: 16–27, 21–16, 16–7, 16–10
	Pts: Romero 18; Rebs: Murphy 11; Asts: Howard 7	Boxscore	Pts: Mensia 16; Rebs: Cubilla, Rivero 11; Asts: Oliva 6	Arena: Gimnasio Manuel Bernardo Aguirre; Attendance: 300; Referees: Juan Fernández (ARG), Gonzalo Salgueiro (URU), Jesús López (VEN)

29 November 2021	Mexico	97–88	United States	Chihuahua City
19:00	Scoring by quarter: 21–28, 27–29, 31–12, 18–19
	Pts: Méndez 27; Rebs: Jaimes 10; Asts: Stoll 11	Boxscore	Pts: Thomas 21; Rebs: Kornet 7 Asts: Thomas 10	Arena: Gimnasio Manuel Bernardo Aguirre; Attendance: 1,500; Referees: Daniel García (VEN), Marcos Benito (BRA), Carlos Vélez (COL)

24 February 2022	Cuba	72–82	Mexico	Havana
19:00	Scoring by quarter: 16–16, 21–23, 17–28, 18–15
	Pts: Rivero 13; Rebs: Rivero 9 Asts: Polas 4	Boxscore	Pts: Girón 23; Rebs: Amigo 11; Asts: Stoll 7	Arena: Coliseo de la Ciudad Deportiva; Attendance: 11,000; Referees: Julio Anaya (PAN), Andreia Silva (BRA), Alan dos Santos (BRA)

24 February 2022	United States	93–76	Puerto Rico	Washington
19:00	Scoring by quarter: 20–27, 22–17, 32–14, 19–18
	Pts: Johnson 18; Rebs: Bell 8 Asts: Harper 5	Boxscore	Pts: Mojica 18; Rebs: Romero 6 Asts: Browne 4	Arena: Entertainment and Sports Arena; Attendance: 713; Referees: Andrés Bartel (URU), Diego Chiconato (BRA), Michael Scott (CAN)

27 February 2022	United States	89–67	Mexico	Washington
13:00	Scoring by quarter: 24–14, 24–7, 20–24, 21–22
	Pts: Galloway 15; Rebs: Bell 7 Asts: Harper 6	Boxscore	Pts: Jaimes 11; Rebs: Jaimes 10; Asts: Bonilla 4	Arena: Entertainment and Sports Arena; Attendance: 908; Referees: Andrés García (URU), Diego Chiconato (BRA), Yezid Carreño (COL)

27 February 2022	Cuba	62–65	Puerto Rico	Havana
18:00	Scoring by quarter: 14–12, 22–19, 11–21, 15–13
	Pts: Rivero 13; Rebs: Polas Bartolo 7 Asts: Rivero 4	Boxscore	Pts: De Jesús 21; Rebs: Browne 7 Asts: Mojica 3	Arena: Coliseo de la Ciudad Deportiva; Attendance: 4,100; Referees: Julio Anaya (PAN), Andreia Silva (BRA), Norval Young (ISV)

1 July 2022	Puerto Rico	75–83	United States	San Juan
20:10	Scoring by quarter: 20–21, 17–21, 14–24, 24–17
	Pts: Alvarado 20; Rebs: Romero 7 Asts: Alvarado 4	Boxscore	Pts: Jackson 26; Rebs: Bell 7 Asts: Bell 6	Arena: Roberto Clemente Coliseum; Attendance: 10,000; Referees: Guilherme Locatelli (BRA), Alan dos Santos (BRA), Carlos Peralta (ECU)

1 July 2022	Mexico	75–66	Cuba	Chihuahua City
20:10	Scoring by quarter: 18–16, 24–20, 19–11, 14–19
	Pts: Stoll 17; Rebs: I. Gutiérrez, Jaimes 8 Asts: Cruz, J. Gutiérrez 4	Boxscore	Pts: Rivero 17; Rebs: Rivero 10; Asts: Guzmán, Rivero 2	Arena: Gimnasio Manuel Bernardo Aguirre; Attendance: 6,500; Referees: Juan Fernández (ARG), Michael Scott (CAN), Claudio Osorio (CHI)

4 July 2022	Cuba	64–87	United States	Havana
19:10	Scoring by quarter: 16–14, 14–28, 19–25, 15–20
	Pts: Cubilla 15; Rebs: Rivero 10; Asts: Rivero 2	Boxscore	Pts: Munford 24; Rebs: Bell 8 Asts: Bell 6	Arena: Coliseo de la Ciudad Deportiva; Attendance: 2,000; Referees: Marcos Benito (BRA), Rodrigo Mejía (COL), Fernando Leite (BRA)

4 July 2022	Puerto Rico	97–87(OT)	Mexico	San Juan
20:10	Scoring by quarter: 19–18, 32–17, 17–24, 16–25, Overtime: 13–3
	Pts: Alvarado 22; Rebs: Romero 12; Asts: Alvarado 7	Boxscore	Pts: Amigo 20; Rebs: Amigo 9 Asts: Amigo, Cruz 5	Arena: Roberto Clemente Coliseum; Referees: Michael Weiland (CAN), Juan Fernández (ARG), Jayson Stiell (CAN)

=== Second round ===
The twelve qualified teams were divided into two groups and played the other three teams from the other group twice. Group A was paired with Group C and Group B with Group D. All results from the first round were carried over.

All times are local.

==== Group E ====
Pos	Team	Pld	W	L	PF	PA	PD	Pts	Qualification
1	Canada	12	11	1	1172	821	+351	23	2023 FIBA Basketball World Cup
2	Dominican Republic	12	9	3	985	862	+123	21	2023 FIBA Basketball World Cup
3	Venezuela	12	8	4	927	806	+121	20 (Note: Venezuela 137–127 Argentina)	2023 FIBA Basketball World Cup
4	Argentina	12	8	4	944	865	+79	20	
5	Panama	12	3	9	822	944	−122	15 (Note: Panama 167–149 Bahamas)	
6	Bahamas	12	3	9	931	1103	−172	15	

Source: FIBA
Rules for classification: 1) Points; 2) Head-to-head results; 3) Points difference; 4) Points scored.
Notes:

25 August 2022	Canada	99–87	Argentina	Victoria
19:40	Scoring by quarter: 28–21, 24–18, 31–29, 16–19
	Pts: Gilgeous-Alexander 23; Rebs: Olynyk, Powell 7 Asts: Gilgeous-Alexander 8	Boxscore	Pts: Laprovíttola 30; Rebs: Delía 9 Asts: Campazzo 8	Arena: Save-On-Foods Memorial Centre; Attendance: 6,200; Referees: Jorge Vázquez (PUR), Jenna Reneau (USA), Blanca Burns (USA)

25 August 2022	Bahamas	81–86	Venezuela	Nassau
20:00	Scoring by quarter: 29–21, 13–14, 18–24, 21–27
	Pts: Jones 20; Rebs: Jones 10; Asts: Jones 4	Boxscore	Pts: Carrera, Sojo 17; Rebs: Graterol 7 Asts: Vargas 8	Arena: Kendall Isaacs Gymnasium; Attendance: 1,500; Referees: Carlos Peralta (ECU), Johnny Batista (PUR), Alan dos Santos (BRA)

25 August 2022	Dominican Republic	70–61	Panama	Santo Domingo
20:10	Scoring by quarter: 21–14, 13–12, 13–17, 23–18
	Pts: Delgado 18; Rebs: Delgado 11; Asts: Bautista Caba 4	Boxscore	Pts: Mitchell 19; Rebs: Mitchell 9 Asts: Gaskins 7	Arena: Palacio de los Deportes Virgilio Travieso Soto; Attendance: 2,500; Referees: Krishna Domínguez (MEX), Andreia Silva (BRA), Kristian Paez (ECU)

29 August 2022	Venezuela	76–72	Dominican Republic	Barquisimeto
18:10	Scoring by quarter: 28–13, 23–18, 16–27, 9–14
	Pts: Carrera 12; Rebs: Ruiz 7 Asts: Vargas 7	Boxscore	Pts: Liz, Duarte 20; Rebs: Delgado 11; Asts: Liz 3	Arena: Domo Bolivariano de Barquisimeto; Referees: Guilherme Locatelli (BRA), Roberto Vázquez (PUR), Jenna Reneau (USA)

29 August 2022	Panama	50–106	Canada	Panama City
19:10	Scoring by quarter: 7–33, 18–31, 11–28, 14–14
	Pts: Jackson 16; Rebs: Ayarza 7 Asts: Gaskins 3	Boxscore	Pts: Olynyk 18; Rebs: Powell 8 Asts: Olynyk, Pangos 5	Arena: Roberto Durán Arena; Referees: Omar Bermúdez (MEX), Andrés Bartel (URU), Johnny Batista (PUR)

29 August 2022	Argentina	95–77	Bahamas	Mar del Plata
21:40	Scoring by quarter: 21–15, 22–29, 25–15, 27–18
	Pts: Deck 37; Rebs: Deck 7 Asts: Campazzo 10	Boxscore	Pts: Jones 16; Rebs: Hield, Thompson 7 Asts: Hield 6	Arena: Polideportivo Islas Malvinas; Referees: Alexis Mercado (PUR), Hortencia Sánchez (MEX), Carlos Vélez (COL)

10 November 2022	Dominican Republic	80–69	Argentina	Santo Domingo
20:00	Scoring by quarter: 20–20, 21–13, 20–19, 19–17
	Pts: Suero 20; Rebs: Delgado 9 Asts: Feliz 6	Boxscore	Pts: Brussino 16; Rebs: Brussino 7 Asts: Brussino 4	Arena: Palacio de los Deportes Virgilio Travieso Soto; Attendance: 2,000; Referees: Andrés Bartel (URU), Carlos Peralta (ECU), Carlos Vélez (COL)

10 November 2022	Canada	94–56	Venezuela	Edmonton
19:10	Scoring by quarter: 25–10, 21–21, 24–11, 24–14
	Pts: Robertson 16; Rebs: Klassen 10; Asts: Chery 6	Boxscore	Pts: Zamora 14; Rebs: Colmenares 7 Asts: Cubillán 4	Arena: Edmonton Expo Centre; Attendance: 3,129; Referees: Roberto Vázquez (PUR), Johnny Batista (PUR), Alan dos Santos (BRA)

11 November 2022	Bahamas	83–79	Panama	Nassau
20:00	Scoring by quarter: 24–23, 21–14, 18–26, 20–16
	Pts: Nesbitt 14; Rebs: Munnings 13; Asts: Cornish 6	Boxscore	Pts: Ayarza 18; Rebs: Ayarza 8 Asts: Gaskins 4	Arena: Kendal Isaacs Gymnasium; Attendance: 314; Referees: Krishna Domínguez (MEX), Alexis Mercado (PUR), Claudio Osorio (CHI)

13 November 2022	Canada	112–71	Panama	Edmonton
17:10	Scoring by quarter: 30–21, 22–11, 33–17, 27–22
	Pts: Best 22; Rebs: Klassen 8 Asts: Klassen, T. Scrubb 5	Boxscore	Pts: Oglivie 14; Rebs: Oglivie, Romero 9 Asts: Rodriguez 5	Arena: Edmonton Expo Centre; Attendance: 3,181; Referees: Jorge Vázquez (PUR), Grant Todey (USA), Claudio Osorio (CHI)

13 November 2022	Dominican Republic	72–68	Venezuela	Santo Domingo
18:00	Scoring by quarter: 17–20, 18–17, 12–19, 25–12
	Pts: J. Montero 22; Rebs: Delgado 10; Asts: three players 2	Boxscore	Pts: Carrera 15; Rebs: Colmenares 7 Asts: Vargas 4	Arena: Palacio de los Deportes Virgilio Travieso Soto; Attendance: 2,500; Referees: Guilherme Locatelli (BRA), Krishna Domínguez (MEX), Jesed Díaz (PUR)

13 November 2022	Bahamas	76–80	Argentina	Nassau
19:15	Scoring by quarter: 18–19, 12–23, 17–21, 29–17
	Pts: Nesbitt 18; Rebs: Nesbitt 12; Asts: Rolle 6	Boxscore	Pts: Vaulet 19; Rebs: Delía 7 Asts: Vildoza 4	Arena: Kendal Isaacs Gymnasium; Attendance: 100; Referees: Roberto Vázquez (PUR), Johnny Batista (PUR), Alan dos Santos (BRA)

23 February 2023	Venezuela	115–70	Bahamas	Caracas
19:10	Scoring by quarter: 33–21, 34–16, 25–14, 23–19
	Pts: Cubillán, Materán 16; Rebs: Graterol 9 Asts: Vargas 7	Boxscore	Pts: Bridgewater, Pratt 16; Rebs: Smith 11; Asts: Nairn, Rolle III 2	Arena: Poliedro de Caracas; Attendance: 11,772; Referees: Carlos Peralta (ECU), Diego Chiconato (BRA), Kristian Paez (ECU)

23 February 2023	Panama	67–93	Dominican Republic	Panama City
19:10	Scoring by quarter: 14–20, 25–18, 19–26, 9–29
	Pts: Oglivie 15; Rebs: Bishop 6 Asts: Gaskins 5	Boxscore	Pts: J. Montero 17; Rebs: Delgado 10; Asts: Solano 8	Arena: Roberto Durán Arena; Attendance: 3,745; Referees: Grant Todey (USA), Blanca Burns (USA), Krishna Domínguez (MEX)

23 February 2023	Argentina	83–72	Canada	Mar del Plata
21:40	Scoring by quarter: 17–18, 23–13, 21–19, 22–22
	Pts: Brussino, Campazzo 13; Rebs: Delía 7 Asts: Campazzo 11	Boxscore	Pts: Scrubb 18; Rebs: Young 9 Asts: Scrubb 5	Arena: Polideportivo Islas Malvinas; Attendance: 7,104; Referees: Roberto Vázquez (PUR), Johnny Batista (PUR), Alan dos Santos (BRA)

26 February 2023	Venezuela	57–74	Canada	Caracas
20:10	Scoring by quarter: 17–22, 13–15, 8–16, 19–21
	Pts: Colmenares 13; Rebs: Carrera 11; Asts: Cubillán 4	Boxscore	Pts: P. Scrubb, Young 14; Rebs: T. Scrubb 5 Asts: Bell-Haynes 7	Arena: Poliedro de Caracas; Attendance: 12,609; Referees: Krishna Domínguez (MEX), Andrés García (URU), Alan dos Santos (BRA)

26 February 2023	Argentina	75–79	Dominican Republic	Mar del Plata
21:10	Scoring by quarter: 24–19, 18–16, 22–19, 11–25
	Pts: Deck 27; Rebs: Garino, Laprovíttola 5 Asts: Campazzo 5	Boxscore	Pts: Montero 22; Rebs: Delgado 10; Asts: Feliz 4	Arena: Polideportivo Islas Malvinas; Attendance: 7,512; Referees: Carlos Peralta (ECU), Kristian Paez (ECU), Roberto Vázquez (PUR)

26 February 2023	Panama	88–66	Bahamas	Panama City
19:10	Scoring by quarter: 21–20, 22–14, 25–15, 20–17
	Pts: Bishop 20; Rebs: Oglivie 10; Asts: Gaskins 6	Boxscore	Pts: Bridgewater, Coleby 11; Rebs: Coleby, Smith 9 Asts: Bridgewater 5	Arena: Roberto Durán Arena; Attendance: 2,655; Referees: Johnny Batista (PUR), Carlos Vélez (COL), Roberto Fernández (CRC)

==== Group F ====
Pos	Team	Pld	W	L	PF	PA	PD	Pts	Qualification
1	United States	12	9	3	1066	952	+114	21	2023 FIBA Basketball World Cup
2	Puerto Rico	12	8	4	959	942	+17	20 (Note: Puerto Rico 3–1; Mexico 2–2; Brazil 1–3)	2023 FIBA Basketball World Cup
3	Mexico	12	8	4	1000	948	+52	20	2023 FIBA Basketball World Cup
4	Brazil	12	8	4	1046	871	+175	20	2023 FIBA Basketball World Cup
5	Uruguay	12	5	7	867	935	−68	17	
6	Colombia	12	3	9	928	1101	−173	15	

Source: FIBA
Rules for classification: 1) Points; 2) Head-to-head results; 3) Points difference; 4) Points scored.
Notes:

25 August 2022	United States	105–71	Uruguay	Paradise
18:00	Scoring by quarter: 20–16, 33–13, 31–19, 21–23
	Pts: Jenkins 22; Rebs: Hernandez 8 Asts: Stockton 9	Boxscore	Pts: Batista, Parodi 14; Rebs: Batista 5 Asts: Granger 4	Arena: Cox Pavilion; Attendance: 732; Referees: Juan Fernández (ARG), Felipe Ibarra (CHI), Waseem Husainy (CAN)

25 August 2022	Puerto Rico	75–72	Brazil	San Juan
20:10	Scoring by quarter: 15–24, 21–19, 16–16, 23–13
	Pts: Waters 29; Rebs: Conditt 7 Asts: Waters 6	Boxscore	Pts: Dias 16; Rebs: Lima 7 Asts: Huertas 5	Arena: Roberto Clemente Coliseum; Attendance: 8,571; Referees: Julio Anaya (PAN), Jayson Stiell (CAN), Norval Young (ISV)

25 August 2022	Mexico	89–93(OT)	Colombia	Chihuahua
21:30	Scoring by quarter: 32–21, 23–18, 12–21, 13–20, Overtime: 9–13
	Pts: Gutiérrez 19; Rebs: Jaimes 9 Asts: Toscano-Anderson 4	Boxscore	Pts: Angola 21; Rebs: three players 9 Asts: Tello 6	Arena: Gimnasio Auditorio Universitario; Attendance: 10,200; Referees: Daniel García (VEN), José Fernández (CRC), Franco Ronconi (ARG)

29 August 2022	Brazil	72–82	Mexico	Jaraguá do Sul
19:30	Scoring by quarter: 13–17, 17–21, 17–25, 25–19
	Pts: Dos Santos 15; Rebs: Georginho 6 Asts: Georginho, Huertas 4	Boxscore	Pts: Ávalos, Stoll 16; Rebs: Girón, Gutiérrez 7 Asts: Stoll 5	Arena: Arena Jaraguá; Attendance: 8,100; Referees: Carlos Peralta (ECU), Felipe Ibarra (CHI), Danilo Molina (ARG)

29 August 2022	Colombia	77–95	United States	Barranquilla
19:40	Scoring by quarter: 10–19, 22–26, 18–25, 27–25
	Pts: Angola 18; Rebs: Echenique 8 Asts: Palacios 3	Boxscore	Pts: Jenkins 26; Rebs: Mika 9 Asts: Stockton 5	Arena: Coliseo Elías Chegwin; Referees: Jesús López (VEN), Julio Anaya (PAN), Jayson Stiell (CAN)

29 August 2022	Uruguay	78–70	Puerto Rico	Montevideo
20:10	Scoring by quarter: 15–15, 21–11, 21–14, 21–30
	Pts: Granger 25; Rebs: Granger 6 Asts: Fitipaldo 5	Boxscore	Pts: Plummer 20; Rebs: Reyes 7 Asts: Waters 6	Arena: Antel Arena; Referees: Daniel García (VEN), Kristian Paez (ECU), Franco Ronconi (ARG)

11 November 2022	United States	79–94	Brazil	Washington
16:00	Scoring by quarter: 21–30, 13–28, 21–17, 24–19
	Pts: Galloway 14; Rebs: three players 4 Asts: Chiozza 7	Boxscore	Pts: Caboclo 24; Rebs: Meindl 9 Asts: Huertas 7	Arena: Entertainment and Sports Arena; Attendance: 878; Referees: Julio Anaya (PAN), Kristian Paez (ECU), Waseem Husainy (CAN)

11 November 2022	Puerto Rico	91–79	Colombia	San Juan
20:10	Scoring by quarter: 19–18, 20–17, 19–24, 33–20
	Pts: Thompson 22; Rebs: Thompson 6 Asts: Waters 6	Boxscore	Pts: Angola 22; Rebs: Ibargüen 12; Asts: Angola 6	Arena: Roberto Clemente Coliseum; Referees: Juan Fernández (ARG), Norval Young (ISV), Roberto Fernández (CRC)

11 November 2022	Mexico	80–60	Uruguay	Chihuahua
20:30	Scoring by quarter: 18–12, 22–14, 26–22, 14–12
	Pts: Girón 20; Rebs: Jaimes 9 Asts: Cruz 5	Boxscore	Pts: Batista 20; Rebs: Batista 7 Asts: Fitipaldo4	Arena: Gimnasio Auditorio Universitario; Attendance: 6,726; Referees: Daniel García (VEN), Franco Ronconi (ARG), Michael Scott (CAN)

14 November 2022	United States	88–81	Colombia	Washington
19:00	Scoring by quarter: 30–19, 17–22, 20–14, 21–26
	Pts: Galloway, Stockton 23; Rebs: Jeffries 9 Asts: Jeffries 5	Boxscore	Pts: Jackson 25; Rebs: Almanza 12; Asts: Roque 7	Arena: Entertainment and Sports Arena; Attendance: 626; Referees: Roberto Fernández (CRC), Jayson Stiell (CAN), Michael Scott (CAN)

14 November 2022	Puerto Rico	76–68	Uruguay	San Juan
20:10	Scoring by quarter: 12–23, 28–11, 21–14, 15–20
	Pts: Waters 17; Rebs: Parker 11; Asts: Waters 6	Boxscore	Pts: Batista 19; Rebs: Batista 16; Asts: Granger 4	Arena: Roberto Clemente Coliseum; Attendance: 8,000; Referees: Julio Anaya (PAN), Kristian Paez (ECU), Waseem Husainy (CAN)

14 November 2022	Mexico	56–102	Brazil	Chihuahua
20:30	Scoring by quarter: 10–29, 16–21, 12–16, 18–36
	Pts: Cruz 20; Rebs: Jaimes 6 Asts: Stoll 4	Boxscore	Pts: Caboclo 16; Rebs: Caboclo 10; Asts: Huertas 5	Arena: Gimnasio Auditorio Universitario; Attendance: 8,155; Referees: Juan Fernández (ARG), Felipe Ibarra (CHI), Jesús López (VEN)

23 February 2023	Colombia	54–113	Mexico	Medellín
19:10	Scoring by quarter: 17–26, 7–31, 16–31, 14–25
	Pts: Ibargüen 19; Rebs: Ibargüen, Jackson 6 Asts: Roque 5	Boxscore	Pts: Méndez 20; Rebs: Ibarra 9 Asts: Cruz, Stoll 6	Arena: Coliseo Iván de Bedout; Attendance: 5,892; Referees: Juan Fernández (ARG), Jesús López (VEN), Nathaniel Saunders (CAN)

23 February 2023	Brazil	90–92	Puerto Rico	Santa Cruz do Sul
19:30	Scoring by quarter: 24–24, 20–28, 26–21, 20–19
	Pts: Meindl 18; Rebs: Meindl 9 Asts: three players 5	Boxscore	Pts: Ortiz 21; Rebs: Clavell, Romero 5 Asts: Waters 7	Arena: Ginásio Poliesportivo Arnão; Attendance: 3,150; Referees: Michael Weiland (CAN), Daniel García (VEN), Leonardo Zalazar (ARG)

23 February 2023	Uruguay	77–88	United States	Montevideo
21:10	Scoring by quarter: 18–7, 23–22, 17–30, 19–29
	Pts: Ubal 18; Rebs: Ubal 6 Asts: Parodi 5	Boxscore	Pts: Galloway 21; Rebs: Huff 5 Asts: Moon 6	Arena: Antel Arena; Attendance: 3,800; Referees: Julio Anaya (PAN), Michael Scott (CAN), Felipe Ibarra (CHI)

26 February 2023	Colombia	80–87	Puerto Rico	Medellín
19:10	Scoring by quarter: 20–25, 16–16, 24–19, 20–27
	Pts: Angola 20; Rebs: Tello 10; Asts: Tello 6	Boxscore	Pts: Howard 18; Rebs: Conditt, Romero 10; Asts: Waters 7	Arena: Coliseo Iván de Bedout; Attendance: 4,562; Referees: Michael Scott (CAN), Jesús López (VEN), Jayson Stiell (CAN)

26 February 2023	Brazil	83–76	United States	Santa Cruz do Sul
21:10	Scoring by quarter: 22–16, 17–19, 23–19, 21–22
	Pts: Caboclo 21; Rebs: G. Santos 9 Asts: Dos Santos 8	Boxscore	Pts: Galloway 19; Rebs: Sword 9 Asts: Gaddy 4	Arena: Ginásio Poliesportivo Arnão; Attendance: 5,542; Referees: Juan Fernández (ARG), Julio Anaya (PAN), Nathaniel Saunders (CAN)

26 February 2023	Uruguay	69–82	Mexico	Montevideo
21:10	Scoring by quarter: 26–18, 12–28, 18–17, 13–19
	Pts: Parodi 25; Rebs: Batista 7 Asts: Batista 5	Boxscore	Pts: Cruz, Girón 17; Rebs: Jaimes 10; Asts: Jaimes 6	Arena: Antel Arena; Attendance: 3,800; Referees: Michael Weiland (CAN), Daniel García (VEN), Leonardo Zalazar (ARG)

==== Best fourth placed team ====
Pos	Grp	Team	Pld	W	L	PF	PA	PD	Pts	Qualification
1	F	Brazil	12	8	4	1046	871	+175	20	2023 FIBA Basketball World Cup
2	E	Argentina	12	8	4	944	865	+79	20	

Source: FIBA

== Statistical leaders ==
As of 26 February 2023

=== Player averages ===
Category	Player	Team	Average
Points	Braian Angola	Colombia	20.1
Rebounds	Ángel Delgado	Dominican Republic	11.4
Assists	Paul Stoll	Mexico	5.4
Steals	Víctor Liz	Dominican Republic	2.5
Blocks	Bruno Caboclo	Brazil	1.4
Minutes	Braian Angola	Colombia	37.6
Efficiency	Braian Angola	Colombia	20.6

=== Team averages ===
Category	Team	Average
Points	Canada	102.6
Rebounds	Canada	46.3
Assists	Canada	22.4
Steals	Canada	10.7
Blocks	Canada	3.8
Efficiency	Canada	129.9
