= 2015 FIBA Americas Championship qualification =

The qualification for the 2015 FIBA Americas Championship in Mexico was held as early as 2013 until 2014. There are several stages of qualification for some teams. Aside from the 2015 FIBA Americas Championship, the tournaments also doubled as qualifiers for basketball at the 2015 Pan-American Games.

== Qualification format ==
Each FIBA Americas subzone has a specific number of berths, generally based on the relative strengths of its member national teams. For the 2013 FIBA Americas Championship, the berths distribution is:

Zone	Total berths
North America	2
Central America and Caribbean	4
South America	3
Host team	1
Total	10

=== North America ===
For the North American zone, since there are only 2 member teams (Canada and the United States) and there are 2 berths, no qualification games are necessary. Furthermore, since the United States won the 2014 FIBA Basketball World Cup and automatically qualified for the 2016 Summer Olympics, they withdrew from the FIBA Americas Championship. Their non-participation opened up an extra berth, which was awarded to the fourth placed team in the South American Basketball Championship 2014.

=== Central America and Caribbean ===
Some teams from the Central America and Caribbean Commission Zone had to qualify for the 2014 Centrobasket. The qualifying tournament was the 2014 FIBA CBC Championship for Caribbean teams, and the 2013 FIBA COCABA Championship for teams from Mexico and Central America. The top four teams from the 2014 Centrobasket advance to the FIBA Americas Championship; host country Mexico automatically qualified.

=== South America ===
The 2014 South American Basketball Championship determined the teams that will qualify for 2015 FIBA Americas Championship. Since the USA is skipping this tournament, this opened up an additional berth for South American teams, increasing the number of berths from three to four.

== 2013 FIBA COCABA Championship ==
The 2013 FIBA COCABA Championship in El Salvador serves as the qualifier for the 2014 Centrobasket for Central American national teams. The top three advance to the Centrobasket.

=== Results ===
Pos	Team	Pld	W	L	PF	PA	PD	Pts	Qualification
1st place, gold medalist(s)	Mexico	3	3	0	232	138	+94	6	Qualification to 2014 Centrobasket
2nd place, silver medalist(s)	El Salvador	3	2	1	166	167	−1	5	Qualification to 2014 Centrobasket
3rd place, bronze medalist(s)	Costa Rica	3	1	2	153	193	−40	4	Qualification to 2014 Centrobasket
4	Honduras	3	0	3	166	219	−53	3	

Source: FIBA Archive

26 July 2013

Mexico	82–45	Costa Rica

Gimnasio Nacional José Adolfo Pineda, San Salvador

26 July 2013

El Salvador	67–61	Honduras

Gimnasio Nacional José Adolfo Pineda, San Salvador

27 July 2013

Honduras	46–90	Mexico

Gimnasio Nacional José Adolfo Pineda, San Salvador

27 July 2013

Costa Rica	46–52	El Salvador

Gimnasio Nacional José Adolfo Pineda, San Salvador

28 July 2013

Honduras	59–62	Costa Rica

Gimnasio Nacional José Adolfo Pineda, San Salvador

28 July 2013

El Salvador	47–60	Mexico

Gimnasio Nacional José Adolfo Pineda, San Salvador

=== Final ranking ===
These were the final rankings. The top 3 teams qualify for the 2014 Centrobasket.

Qualifies to the 2014 Centrobasket

Rank	Team
1st place, gold medalist(s)	Mexico
2nd place, silver medalist(s)	El Salvador
3rd place, bronze medalist(s)	Costa Rica
4	Honduras

== 2014 FIBA CBC Championship ==
The 2014 FIBA CBC Championship in the British Virgin Islands serves as the qualifier for the 2014 Centrobasket for Caribbean national teams. The top three advance to the Centrobasket.

=== Final ranking ===
These were the final rankings. The top 3 teams qualify for the 2014 Centrobasket.

Qualifies to the 2014 Centrobasket

Rank	Team
1st place, gold medalist(s)	Bahamas
2nd place, silver medalist(s)	Cuba
3rd place, bronze medalist(s)	Virgin Islands
4	British Virgin Islands
5	Guyana
6	Barbados
7	Antigua and Barbuda
8	Saint Vincent and the Grenadines

== 2014 Centrobasket ==
The 2014 Centrobasket in Mexico serves as the qualifier to the 2015 FIBA Americas Championship for teams from the Caribbean and Central America. The top four outside of Mexico, who were named final tournament hosts on the day of the final, advance to the FIBA Americas Championship.

=== Final ranking ===
Qualifies to the 2015 FIBA Americas Championship

Rank	Team
1st place, gold medalist(s)	Mexico
2nd place, silver medalist(s)	Puerto Rico
3rd place, bronze medalist(s)	Dominican Republic
4	Cuba
5	Panama
6	Virgin Islands
7	Bahamas
8	Jamaica
9	Costa Rica
10	El Salvador

== 2014 South American Basketball Championship ==
The 2014 South American Basketball Championship in Venezuela serves as the qualifier to the 2015 FIBA Americas Championship for teams from South America. The top four advance to the FIBA Americas Championship.

=== Final ranking ===
This is the final ranking for the participating teams The top three teams, but with the non-participation of the United States, the fourth-best team was also included.

Qualifies to the 2015 FIBA Americas Championship

Rank	Team
1st place, gold medalist(s)	Venezuela
2nd place, silver medalist(s)	Argentina
3rd place, bronze medalist(s)	Brazil
4	Uruguay
5	Paraguay
6	Chile
7	Ecuador
8	Peru
