= FIBA COCABA Championship =

Regional basketball qualifying tournament

- Sport: Basketball
- Founded: 1999
- No. of teams: 7
- Country: FIBA Americas member nations
- Continent: FIBA Americas (Americas)
- Most recent champion: Panama (3rd title)
- Most titles: Mexico (4 titles)
- Related competitions: Centrobasket; FIBA AmeriCup
- Website: FIBA Americas

The COCABA (Confederación Centroamericana de Baloncesto) championship is a regional basketball qualifying tournament and the first of four possible steps that Central American national teams have to participate in order to qualify for major international basketball competitions.

The teams that place first, second or third (and sometimes fourth) in COCABA will move on to the Centrobasket Tournament which is a qualifier for the FIBA AmeriCup. Depending on their successes in the latter tournaments, they could qualify for the Summer Olympics or FIBA Basketball World Cup.

== Men's tournament ==
=== Summaries ===
Summaries
Year	Host (Final phase/game)	Gold medal game			Bronze medal game		
Year	Host (Final phase/game)	Gold	Score	Silver	Bronze	Score	Fourth place
1999	Costa Rica (San Jose)	Panama	77–50	Honduras	Costa Rica	91–77	Nicaragua
2004	El Salvador (San Salvador)	Panama	89–61	Guatemala	El Salvador	95–74	Honduras
2006	Mexico (?)	Mexico	Series; 4–1	Costa Rica	Belize	98–92	El Salvador
2007	El Salvador (San Salvador)	Mexico	Round robin	Costa Rica	El Salvador	Round robin	Guatemala
2009	Mexico (Quintana Roo)	Mexico	106–103	Belize	Panama	86–69	Costa Rica
2011	Mexico (Xalapa)	Not held tournament					
2013	El Salvador (San Salvador)	Mexico	Round robin	El Salvador	Costa Rica	Round robin	Honduras
2015	Costa Rica (San Jose)	Panama	74–46	Costa Rica	Nicaragua	75–71	Mexico

=== Performance by team ===
Rank	Nation	Gold	Silver	Bronze	Total
1	Mexico	4	0	0	4
2	Panama	3	0	1	4
3	Costa Rica	0	3	2	5
4	El Salvador	0	1	2	3
5	Belize	0	1	1	2
6	Guatemala	0	1	0	1
6	Honduras	0	1	0	1
8	Nicaragua	0	0	1	1
Totals (8 entries)		7	7	7	21

=== Participation details ===
Team	(Costa Rica); 1999	(El Salvador); 2004	(Mexico); 2006	(El Salvador); 2007	(Mexico); 2009	(El Salvador); 2013	(Costa Rica); 2015	Total
Belize	–	7th	3rd	–	2nd	–	–	3
Costa Rica	3rd	5th	2nd	2nd	4th	3rd	2nd	7
El Salvador	–	3rd	4th	3rd	8th	2nd	6th	6
Guatemala	5th	2nd	7th	4th	5th	–	7th	6
Honduras	2nd	4th	6th	5th	7th	4th	5th	7
Mexico	–	–	1st	1st	1st	1st	4th	5
Nicaragua	4th	6th	5th	6th	6th	–	3rd	6
Panama	1st	1st	–	–	3rd	–	1st	4

== Women's tournament ==
Summaries
Year	Host (Final phase/game)	Gold medal game			Bronze medal game		
Year	Host (Final phase/game)	Gold	Score	Silver	Bronze	Score	Fourth place
2004	Guatemala (Guatemala City)	Guatemala	Round Robin	Costa Rica	Mexico	Round Robin	Nicaragua
2006	El Salvador (San Salvador)	Not held tournament					
2007	El Salvador (San Salvador)	Guatemala	70–59	Costa Rica	El Salvador	?	Honduras
2009	Guatemala (Cobán)	Mexico	Round Robin	Guatemala	Honduras	Round Robin	El Salvador
2011	El Salvador (San Salvador)	Not held women's tournament					
2013	El Salvador (San Salvador)	Mexico	Round Robin	El Salvador	Costa Rica	Round Robin	Honduras
2015	Costa Rica (Cartago)	Mexico	57–49	Guatemala	El Salvador	57–39	Costa Rica
2022	Mexico (Chihuahua)	Mexico	Round Robin	El Salvador	Guatemala	Round Robin	Costa Rica
2023	El Salvador (San Salvador)	El Salvador	Round Robin	Guatemala	Costa Rica	Round Robin	Panama
2025	Nicaragua (Managua)	Mexico	75–56	El Salvador	Nicaragua	59–49	Panama

== Additional Sources ==
- "Belize Win Silver Medal In FIBA AmeriCup COCABA Championship". Krem Television. 23 July 2018. Archived from the original on 29 August 2018.
