= 2015 FIBA COCABA Championship =

8th Central American Basketball Championship

Tournament details
- Host country: Costa Rica
- Dates: 16–20 September
- Teams: 7
- Venue(s): 1 (in 1 host city)

Final positions
- Champions: Panama (3rd title)

The 2015 Men's FIBA COCABA Championship was the regional basketball championship of FIBA Americas for the Central American and Caribbean subzones. The top 3 national teams qualified to 2016 Centrobasket. The tournament was held in the city of San José, Costa Rica, from 16 to 20 September 2015.

== Participating teams ==
- Honduras
- Guatemala
- Costa Rica
- Mexico
- Belize (withdrew)
- Nicaragua
- El Salvador
- Panama

Costa Rica qualified as host.

== Preliminary round ==
The draw for the 2015 FIBA COCABA Championship was held on August 4, 2015. Eight teams were drawn into two pools with 4 teams in each.

=== Group A ===
Pos	Team	Pld	W	L	PF	PA	PD	Pts	Qualification
1	Costa Rica	3	3	0	213	174	+39	6	Advance to Semifinals
2	Mexico	3	2	1	232	204	+28	5	Advance to Semifinals
3	Honduras	3	1	2	226	203	+23	4	Classification 5−6
4	Guatemala	3	0	3	179	269	−90	3	Classification 5−7

Source: fiba.com

September 16

Honduras	77–82	Mexico
Scoring by quarter: 22–26, 15–13, 23–19, 17–24
Pts: Flores 26; Rebs: Flores 9 Asts: Flores 7		Pts: Gonzalez 24; Rebs: Benitez 7 Asts: Geyne, Benitez 4

Gimnasio Nacional, San José

September 16

Guatemala	59–85	Costa Rica
Scoring by quarter: 11–23, 24–20, 10–21, 14–21
Pts: Gonzalez 13; Rebs: Gonzalez 10; Asts: Cano 4		Pts: Martinez 24; Rebs: Quesada 8 Asts: Conejo 8

Gimnasio Nacional, San José

September 17

Costa Rica	65–54	Honduras
Scoring by quarter: 14–25, 13–14, 13–12, 14–14
Pts: Martinez 29; Rebs: 3 players 5 Asts: Conejo 9		Pts: Salazar 18; Rebs: Banegas 8 Asts: Banegas 5

Gimnasio Nacional, San José

September 17

Mexico	89–64	Guatemala
Scoring by quarter: 20–12, 19–5, 24–28, 26–19
Pts: Gonzalez, Benitez 17; Rebs: Benitez, Lopez 6 Asts: Malpica 7		Pts: Gonzalez 18; Rebs: Enriquez 10; Asts: Gonzalez 5

Gimnasio Nacional, San José

September 18

Honduras	95–56	Guatemala
Scoring by quarter: 25–13, 14–21, 27–4, 29–18
Pts: Flores 30; Rebs: Estlign 7 Asts: Flores 5		Pts: Gonzalez 17; Rebs: Gonzalez 11; Asts: Goddard 4

Gimnasio Nacional, San José

September 18

Costa Rica	63–61	Mexico
Scoring by quarter: 10–11, 21–12, 15–14, 17–24
Pts: Martinez 29; Rebs: Quesada 6 Asts: Conejo 4		Pts: Benitez 19; Rebs: Malpica 7 Asts: Gonzalez 6

Gimnasio Nacional, San José

=== Group B ===
Pos	Team	Pld	W	L	PF	PA	PD	Pts	Qualification
1	Panama	2	2	0	164	136	+28	4	Advance to Semifinals
2	Nicaragua	2	1	1	138	154	−16	3	Advance to Semifinals
3	El Salvador	2	0	2	139	151	−12	2	Classification 5−7

Source: fiba.com

September 16

Nicaragua	75–66	El Salvador
Scoring by quarter: 14–15, 17–20, 22–14, 22–17
Pts: Gonzalez 34; Rebs: Lopez 14; Asts: Saravia, Ponce 2		Pts: Valladares 18; Rebs: Aguilar 11; Asts: Arias 5

Gimnasio Nacional, San José

September 17

Panama	88–63	Nicaragua
Scoring by quarter: 24–14, 24–18, 27–15, 13–16
Pts: Ayarza 25; Rebs: King 8 Asts: Gaskins 6		Pts: Gonzalez, Thomas 11; Rebs: Lopez 11; Asts: Gonzalez 6

Gimnasio Nacional, San José

September 18

El Salvador	73–76	Panama
Scoring by quarter: 12–15, 15–15, 21–25, 25–21
Pts: Aguilar 20; Rebs: Arias 10; Asts: Bandek 5		Pts: Gaskins 22; Rebs: Garces 16; Asts: Muñoz 3

Gimnasio Nacional, San José

== Knockout round ==
Semifinals
19 September
Costa Rica	51
Nicaragua	43
19 September
Panama (OT)	110
Mexico	105

Final
20 September
Costa Rica	46
Panama	74
3rd place
20 September
Nicaragua	75
Mexico	71

=== 5th−7th places semifinal ===
September 19

El Salvador	84–76	Guatemala
Scoring by quarter: 23–28, 19–15, 19–14, 23–19
Pts: Valladares 20; Rebs: Arias 15; Asts: Valladares 7		Pts: Gonzalez 24; Rebs: Gonzalez, Samayoa 8 Asts: Cano 9

Gimnasio Nacional, San José

=== Semifinals ===
September 19

Costa Rica	51–43	Nicaragua
Scoring by quarter: 15–9, 10–9, 8–15, 18–10
Pts: Quesada 17; Rebs: Quesada 13; Asts: Chavarria 4		Pts: Lopez 19; Rebs: Lopez 14; Asts: Gonzalez 3

Gimnasio Nacional, San José

September 19

Panama	110–105 (OT)	Mexico
Scoring by quarter: 20–28, 20–13, 23–16, 18–24, Overtime: 29–24
Pts: Gaskins 28; Rebs: Gaskins, Garces 11; Asts: Muñoz 9		Pts: Benitez 30; Rebs: Gonzalez 10; Asts: Malpica 8

Gimnasio Nacional, San José

=== 5th place match ===
September 20

El Salvador	46–65	Honduras
Scoring by quarter: 11–21, 10–23, 14–16, 11–5
Pts: Arias 14; Rebs: Aguilar 22; Asts: Bandek 4		Pts: Cacho, Flores 19; Rebs: Salazar 9 Asts: Cacho 4

Gimnasio Nacional, San José

=== Third place match ===
September 20

Nicaragua	75–71	Mexico
Scoring by quarter: 12–17, 25–19, 20–14, 18–21
Pts: Thomas 17; Rebs: Lopez 15; Asts: Gonzalez 6		Pts: Benitez 15; Rebs: Lopez 9 Asts: Malpica 10

Gimnasio Nacional, San José

=== Final ===
September 20

Costa Rica	46–74	Panama
Scoring by quarter: 6–21, 11–12, 12–23, 17–18
Pts: Wilson 10; Rebs: Martinez 6 Asts: Conejo, Sanchez 4		Pts: Gaskins 24; Rebs: Garces 9 Asts: 3 players 2

Gimnasio Nacional, San José

2015 FIBA COCABA Championship winners

Panama
Third title

== Final ranking ==
Qualified for the 2016 Centrobasket

N.	Team	W–L
1st place, gold medalist(s)	Panama	4–0
2nd place, silver medalist(s)	Costa Rica	4–1
3rd place, bronze medalist(s)	Nicaragua	2–2
4	Mexico	2–3
5	Honduras	2–2
6	El Salvador	1–3
7	Guatemala	0–4
