= 1997 Centrobasket =

This page shows the results of the 1997 Men's Central American and Caribbean Basketball Championship, also known as the 1997 Centrobasket, which was held in the city of Tegucigalpa, Honduras from May 25 to June 1, 1997. The top four teams qualified for the 1997 Pan American Tournament, held from August 21 to August 31 in Montevideo, Uruguay.

== Competing nations ==
Group A	Group B
Cuba; Honduras; Mexico; Virgin Islands	Dominican Republic; El Salvador; Jamaica; Puerto Rico

== Preliminary round ==
Group A	Pts	Pld	W	L	PF	PA	Diff
Cuba	6	3	3	0	290	189	+101
Mexico	5	3	2	1	243	237	+6
Virgin Islands	4	3	1	2	227	246	–19
Honduras	3	3	0	3	178	266	–88

- 1997-05-24

Cuba	113 – 73	Mexico
Virgin Islands	90 – 75	Honduras

- 1997-05-25

Cuba	100 – 72	Virgin Islands
Honduras	59 – 99	Mexico

- 1997-05-26

Virgin Islands	65 – 71	Mexico
Cuba	77 – 44	Honduras

Group B	Pts	Pld	W	L	PF	PA	Diff
Puerto Rico	6	3	3	0	192	119	+73
Dominican Republic	5	3	2	1	267	232	+35
Jamaica	4	3	1	2	168	149	+19
El Salvador	3	3	0	3	167	294	–127

- 1997-05-25

Puerto Rico	103 – 36	El Salvador
Dominican Republic	88 – 73	Jamaica

- 1997-05-26

Jamaica	95 – 59	El Salvador
Puerto Rico	87 – 83	Dominican Republic

- 1997-05-27

Dominican Republic	96 – 72	El Salvador
Puerto Rico	2 – 0	Jamaica

== Consolidation Round ==
Group C (5th/8th place)	Pts	Pld	W	L	PF	PA	Diff
Virgin Islands	4	2	2	0	189	140	+49
Honduras	3	2	1	1	145	140	+5
El Salvador	2	2	0	2	115	169	–54
Jamaica	0	0	0	0	0	0	0

- 1997-05-28

Honduras	70 – 50	El Salvador

- 1997-05-30

Virgin Islands	99 – 65	El Salvador

Final Group (1st/4th place)	Pts	Pld	W	L	PF	PA	Diff
Puerto Rico	6	3	3	0	262	212	+50
Cuba	5	3	2	1	262	238	+24
Dominican Republic	4	3	1	2	260	242	+18
Mexico	3	3	0	3	208	300	–92

- 1997-05-28

Puerto Rico	89 – 67	Mexico
Cuba	87 – 79	Dominican Republic

- 1997-05-30

Puerto Rico	86 – 62	Cuba
Dominican Republic	98 – 68	Mexico

== Final round ==
- 1997-05-31 — 1st/4th place

Puerto Rico	116 – 71	Mexico
Cuba	88 – 84	Dominican Republic

- 1997-06-01 — 5th/6th place

Virgin Islands	84 – 59	Honduras

- 1997-06-01 — 3rd/4th place

Dominican Republic	92 – 75	Mexico

- 1997-06-01 — 1st/2nd place

Cuba	106 – 93	Puerto Rico

== Final ranking ==
1. Cuba

2. Puerto Rico

3. Dominican Republic

4. Mexico

5. Virgin Islands

6. Honduras

7. El Salvador

— Jamaica

1997 Men's Centrobasket winners

Cuba
Third title

== Team Rosters ==
1.Cuba: Caballero · Abréu · Echevarría · Matamoros · Diago · Ro. Herrera · Pérez · Borrell · Vázquez · Rojas · Núñez · Ru. Herrera · All. Miguel Calderón
