= 2001 Centrobasket =

This page shows the results of the 2001 Men's Central American and Caribbean Basketball Championship, also known as the 2001 Centrobasket, which was held in the city of Toluca, Mexico from July 11 to July 15, 2001. The top four teams qualified for the 2001 Pan American Tournament, scheduled for August 16 to August 27 in Neuquén, Argentina.

== Competing nations ==
Group A	Group B
Dominican Republic; Honduras; Puerto Rico; Virgin Islands	Barbados; Cuba; Mexico; Panama

== Preliminary round ==
Group A	Pts	Pld	W	L	PF	PA	Diff
Puerto Rico	6	3	3	0	281	210	+71
Virgin Islands	5	3	2	1	280	260	+20
Dominican Republic	4	3	1	2	271	257	+14
Honduras	3	3	0	3	207	312	–105

- 2001-07-11

Puerto Rico	98 – 70	Virgin Islands
Dominican Republic	101 – 75	Honduras

- 2001-07-12

Virgin Islands	101 – 92	Dominican Republic
Honduras	62 – 102	Puerto Rico

- 2001-07-13

Honduras	62 – 82	Virgin Islands
Puerto Rico	91 – 88	Dominican Republic

Group B	Pts	Pld	W	L	PF	PA	Diff
Mexico	6	3	3	0	297	267	+30
Panama	5	3	2	1	299	266	+33
Cuba	4	3	1	2	237	240	–3
Barbados	3	3	0	3	227	287	–60

- 2001-07-11

Cuba	89 – 65	Barbados
Mexico	110 – 107	Panama

- 2001-07-12

Panama	90 – 75	Cuba
Mexico	100 – 83	Barbados

- 2001-07-13

Barbados	81 – 102	Panama
Mexico	87 – 77	Cuba

== Consolidation Round ==
- 2001-07-14 — 5th/8th place

Cuba	96 – 84	Honduras
Dominican Republic	100 – 84	Barbados

- 2001-07-14 — 1st/4th place

Puerto Rico	89 – 75	Panama
Mexico	97 – 74	Virgin Islands

== Final round ==
- 2001-07-15 — 7th/8th place

Barbados	70 – 59	Honduras

- 2001-07-15 — 5th/6th place

Dominican Republic	119 – 100	Cuba

- 2001-07-15 — 3rd/4th place

Panama	93 – 82	Virgin Islands

- 2001-07-15 — 1st/2nd place

Puerto Rico	86 – 73	Mexico

== Final ranking ==
1. Puerto Rico

2. Mexico

3. Panama

4. Virgin Islands

5. Dominican Republic

6. Cuba

7. Barbados

8. Honduras

2001 Men's Centrobasket winners

Puerto Rico
Seventh title
