= Norchad Omier =

Nicaraguan basketball player (born 2001)

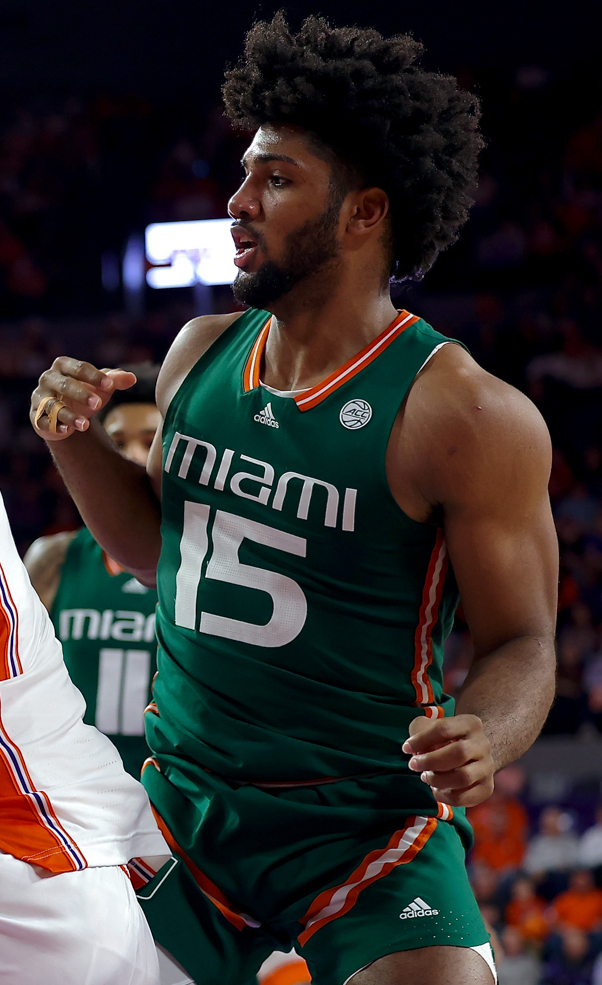
- Omier with the Miami Hurricanes in 2023

No. 77 – Cleveland Cavaliers
- Position: Center
- League: NBA

Personal information
- Born: 28 August 2001 (age 25) Bluefields, Nicaragua
- Listed height: 6 ft 7 in (2.01 m)
- Listed weight: 248 lb (112 kg)

Career information
- High school: Miami Prep (Miami, Florida)
- College: Arkansas State (2020–2022); Miami (Florida) (2022–2024); Baylor (2024–2025)
- NBA draft: 2025: undrafted
- Playing career: 2025–present

Career history
- 2025–2026: Cleveland Charge
- 2026: Los Angeles Clippers
- 2026: →San Diego Clippers
- 2026–present: Cleveland Cavaliers
- 2026–present: →Cleveland Charge

Career highlights
- NBA G League All-Rookie Team (2026); First-team All-Big 12 (2025); Second-team All-ACC (2024); Third-team All-ACC (2023); Sun Belt Player of the Year (2022); 2× First-team All-Sun Belt (2021, 2022); Sun Belt Defensive Player of the Year (2022); Sun Belt Freshman of the Year (2021); Big 12 All-Newcomer Team (2025)
- Stats at NBA.com
- Stats at Basketball Reference

Norchad Bascom Omier Rojas (born 28 August 2001) is a Nicaraguan professional basketball player for the Cleveland Cavaliers of the National Basketball Association (NBA), on a two-way contract with the Cleveland Charge of the NBA G League. He played college basketball for the Arkansas State Red Wolves, Miami Hurricanes and Baylor Bears.

== Early Life ==
A native of Bluefields, Nicaragua, Omier grew up playing several sports, including baseball. He started playing basketball by the age of 13 after a local coach noticed his height. Omier trained at La Academica de Basketball Bluefields in his hometown. He explored professional opportunities in Mexico before joining Miami Prep in Miami, Florida on a full scholarship. Omier averaged 26.7 points and 20.3 rebounds per game, and recorded 40 points and 17 rebounds against IMG Academy. He committed to play college basketball for Arkansas State over offers from Iona, Mercer, UMBC and Marist, and became the first Nicaraguan to sign an NCAA Division I basketball scholarship. He joined the Red Wolves under Spanish-speaking head coach Mike Balado.

== College career ==
On 16 January 2021, Omier posted a freshman season-high 22 points and 17 rebounds in a 93–72 win against Louisiana–Monroe. As a freshman, he averaged 12.6 points and 12.3 rebounds per game, earning First Team All-Sun Belt and Freshman of the Year honors. Omier became the fourth Division I freshman since the 1992–93 season to average at least 12 points and 12 rebounds. At the conclusion of the 2021-22 regular season, Omier was named Sun Belt Player of the Year and Defensive Player of the Year. He transferred to Miami (Florida) and averaged 13.1 points and 10 rebounds per game as a junior.

== Professional career ==
=== Cleveland Charge (2025–2026) ===
After going undrafted in the 2025 NBA draft, Omier joined the Cleveland Cavaliers for the 2025 NBA Summer League. He was waived by the Cavaliers, but was then added to the training camp roster of their NBA G League affiliate, the Cleveland Charge.

During the 2025–26 NBA G League season, Omier established himself as one of the most consistent and productive frontcourt players in the league. In 27 games, he averaged 19.3 points, 12.3 rebounds, and 2.6 assists per game while shooting 58.9% from the field. He led all qualified rookies in rebounds per game (12.3) and total offensive rebounds, while finishing among the league leaders in total rebounds. Omier scored in double figures in all 27 games and recorded 27 double-doubles across the regular season and Tip-Off Tournament.

Omier was named NBA G League Player of the Week for games played from February 2–8, 2026, after averaging 26.0 points, 15.5 rebounds, and 4.0 assists. His performance throughout the season earned him selection to the NBA G League Next Up Game during NBA All-Star 2026. On April 7, 2026, he was named to the All-NBA G League Rookie Team.

Omier also finished third in voting for the 2025–26 Kia NBA G League Rookie of the Year award.

=== Los Angeles / San Diego Clippers (2026) ===
Following his strong G League campaign, Omier signed a two-way contract with the Los Angeles Clippers during the 2025–26 season, allowing him to split time between the NBA roster and the San Diego Clippers. Omier made his NBA debut on March 2, 2026, becoming the first Nicaraguan-born player to appear in an NBA game. In his initial appearances, he demonstrated efficiency in limited minutes, contributing in scoring, rebounding, and interior defense.

Throughout his rookie season, Omier gained recognition for his physical playing style, rebounding ability, and high motor. His style of play drew comparisons in basketball media to former NBA forward Charles Barkley due to his undersized but powerful presence in the paint.

His consistent statistical production also led to him being described in media coverage as a "double-double machine." Off the court, Omier experienced a rapid rise in popularity, with his jersey selling out at the official Los Angeles Clippers team store shortly after release, reflecting strong fan demand.

=== Return to Cavaliers / Charge (2026–present) ===
On September 27, 2026, the Minnesota Timberwolves announced Omier as part of their training camp roster. On October 17, 2026, Omier was waived.

On October 24, 2026, Omier signed with the Cleveland Charge, returning to the franchise for a second stint ahead of the 2026–27 season.

== National team career ==
In April 2021, Omier made his national team debut for Nicaragua during 2023 FIBA Basketball World Cup qualification.

== Career statistics ==
Legend
GP	Games played	GS	Games started	MPG	Minutes per game
FG%	Field goal percentage	3P%	3-point field goal percentage	FT%	Free throw percentage
RPG	Rebounds per game	APG	Assists per game	SPG	Steals per game
BPG	Blocks per game	PPG	Points per game	**Bold**	Career high

=== NBA ===
Year	Team	GP	GS	MPG	FG%	3P%	FT%	RPG	APG	SPG	BPG	PPG
2025–26	L.A. Clippers	6	0	4.0	.700	.000	1.000	1.2	.3	.2	.0	2.8
Career		6	0	4.0	.700	.000	1.000	1.2	.3	.2	.0	2.8

=== College ===
Year	Team	GP	GS	MPG	FG%	3P%	FT%	RPG	APG	SPG	BPG	PPG
2020–21	Arkansas State	23	22	26.7	.539	.000	.688	**12.3**	.8	1.2	1.4	12.6
2021–22	Arkansas State	29	28	28.9	**.632**	.333	.729	12.2	1.2	**1.6**	**1.9**	**17.9**
2022–23	Miami	**37**	**36**	28.8	.574	.313	.736	10.0	1.3	1.1	1.1	13.1
2023–24	Miami	31	31	30.6	.552	**.353**	**.750**	10.0	1.2	1.5	.8	17.0
2024–25	Baylor	35	35	**31.7**	.556	.290	**.750**	10.8	**1.5**	1.2	.9	15.7
Career		155	152	29.5	.572	.314	.735	10.9	1.2	1.3	1.2	15.3

== See also ==
- List of NCAA Division I men's basketball career rebounding leaders
- List of NCAA Division I men's basketball players with 2,000 points and 1,000 rebounds
