= 2014 Centrobasket =

International basketball tournament for Middle America

2014 FIBA Centrobasket
24th Central American and Caribbean Basketball Championship

Tournament details
- Host country: Mexico
- Dates: August 1 to August 7
- Teams: 10
- Venue(s): 1 (in 1 host city)

Final positions
- Champions: Mexico (3rd title)

The 2014 Men's Central American and Caribbean Basketball Championship, also known as 2014 Centrobasket, was the regional basketball championship of FIBA Americas for the Central American and Caribbean subzone. The top 4 teams qualify for the 2015 FIBA Americas Championship. The tournament was held in the city of Tepic in Nayarit, Mexico from August 1 to August 7.

== Participating teams ==
- Virgin Islands
- Bahamas
- Jamaica
- Costa Rica
- Mexico
- El Salvador
- Cuba
- Dominican Republic
- Panama
- Puerto Rico

Mexico qualified as host.

Puerto Rico, Panama, Jamaica and Dominican Republic qualified as the 4 first places in the 2012 Centrobasket

The Bahamas, U.S. Virgin Islands and Cuba qualified from the 2014 FIBA CBC Championship, which took place from July 1 to July 5 in Tortola, British Virgin Islands. (http://www.fibaamericas.com/torneos1.asp?xtab=1&t=EYXONZZFPF)

El Salvador and Costa Rica qualified from the 2013 COCABA Championship, which took place from July 26 to July 28 in San Salvador, El Salvador. (http://www.fibaamericas.com/torneos1.asp?xtab=1&t=ZXSEXGVNUC)

== Preliminary round ==
The draw for the 2014 Centrobasket Championship was held in San Juan, Puerto Rico on June 9, 2014. Ten teams were drawn into two pools with five teams in each.

=== Group A ===
Team	Pld	W	L	PF	PA	PD	Pts
Dominican Republic	4	4	0	305	243	+62	8
Cuba	4	3	1	285	264	+21	7
Panama	4	2	2	265	237	+28	6
Jamaica	4	1	3	245	261	−16	5
Costa Rica	4	0	4	210	305	−95	4

August 1

Cuba	71–63	Panama
Scoring by quarter: 25-20, 13-13, 16-14, 17-16
Pts: Oliva 17; Rebs: Oliva 6 Asts: Oliva 4		Pts: Hicks 17; Rebs: Lloreda 9 Asts: Muñoz 3

Auditorio de la Gente, Tepic

August 1

Costa Rica	47–85	Dominican Republic
Scoring by quarter: 11-14, 6-25, 10-27, 20-19
Pts: Conejo 17; Rebs: Anderson-Brown 6 Asts: Sánchez 3		Pts: Suero 13; Rebs: Roberts 10; Asts: Coronado 6

Auditorio de la Gente, Tepic

August 2

Jamaica	58–70	Cuba
Scoring by quarter: 12-22, 15-9, 19-15, 12-24
Pts: Scott 20; Rebs: Alliman 8 Asts: Efejuku 3		Pts: Oliva 30; Rebs: Haití 16; Asts: Oliva 7

Auditorio de la Gente, Tepic

August 2

Panama	84–40	Costa Rica
Scoring by quarter: 14-11, 26-9, 26-9, 18-11
Pts: Hicks 24; Rebs: Lloreda 17; Asts: Muñoz 7		Pts: Martínez 20; Rebs: Anderson-Brown 15; Asts: Sánchez 6

Auditorio de la Gente, Tepic

August 3

Costa Rica	56–64	Jamaica
Scoring by quarter: 15-14, 13-13, 5-19, 23-18
Pts: Martínez 15; Rebs: Anderson-Brown 7 Asts: Conejo (4)		Pts: Efejuku 23; Rebs: Alliman 10; Asts: Efejuku 3

Auditorio de la Gente, Tepic

August 3

Dominican Republic	71–56	Panama
Scoring by quarter: 25-4, 6-31, 17-10, 23-11
Pts: Maye 16; Rebs: Fortuna 5 Asts: Fortuna 6		Pts: Pinnock 17; Rebs: Lloreda 11; Asts: Muñoz 5

Auditorio de la Gente, Tepic

August 4

Cuba	72–67	Costa Rica
Scoring by quarter: 24-10, 14-22, 23-20, 11-15
Pts: Haití 15; Rebs: Haití 11; Asts: Oliva 5		Pts: Martínez 20; Rebs: Martínez 10; Asts: Martínez 4

Auditorio de la Gente, Tepic

August 4

Jamaica	68–73	Dominican Republic
Scoring by quarter: 17-16, 17-18, 11-18, 23-21
Pts: Efejuku 25; Rebs: Blair 9 Asts: Blair 3		Pts: Vargas 23; Rebs: Vargas 10; Asts: De León 6

Auditorio de la Gente, Tepic

August 5

Panama	62–55	Jamaica
Scoring by quarter: 16-14, 14-16, 12-10, 20-15
Pts: Muñoz 13; Rebs: Garcés 11; Asts: Pinnock 5		Pts: Scott 14; Rebs: Alliman 9 Asts: Blair 2

Auditorio de la Gente, Tepic

August 5

Dominican Republic	76–72	Cuba
Scoring by quarter: 20-24, 17-14, 17-18, 22-16
Pts: Vargas 13; Rebs: Roberts 10; Asts: Liz 3		Pts: Granda 16; Rebs: Justiz 5 Asts: Rodríguez 6

Auditorio de la Gente, Tepic

=== Group B ===
Team	Pld	W	L	PF	PA	PD	Pts
Mexico	4	4	0	346	250	+96	8
Puerto Rico	4	3	1	343	269	+74	7
Virgin Islands	4	2	2	313	320	−7	6
Bahamas	4	1	3	304	305	−1	5
El Salvador	4	0	4	239	401	−162	4

August 1

Puerto Rico	88–72	Bahamas
Scoring by quarter: 19-10, 23-14, 23-25, 23-23
Pts: Barea 19; Rebs: López-Sosa 8 Asts: Barea 5		Pts: Hield 30; Rebs: Rolle 5 Asts: Rose 5

Auditorio de la Gente, Tepic

August 1

Mexico	74–64	Virgin Islands
Scoring by quarter: 14-12, 21-18, 19-15, 20-19
Pts: Cruz 20; Rebs: Ayón 14; Asts: Stoll 5		Pts: Hart 11; Rebs: Victor 8 Asts: Hodge 3

Auditorio de la Gente, Tepic

August 2

Bahamas	96–47	El Salvador
Pts: Hield 46; Rebs: Hield 15; Asts: Gray 7		Pts: Valladares 14; Rebs: Valladares 7 Asts: Perdomo 2

Auditorio de la Gente, Tepic

August 2

Virgin Islands	64–97	Puerto Rico
Scoring by quarter: 8-22, 20-20, 22-27, 14-28
Pts: Hart 11; Rebs: Victor 8 Asts: Hodge 4		Pts: Barea 25; Rebs: López-Sosa 8 Asts: F. Rivera 5

Auditorio de la Gente, Tepic

August 3

El Salvador	58–93	Puerto Rico
Scoring by quarter: 16-17, 15-22, 17-24, 10-30
Pts: Valladares 20; Rebs: C. Arias 7 Asts: Bandek 2		Pts: Rosario 19; Rebs: Clemente 8 Asts: C. Rivera 7

Auditorio de la Gente, Tepic

August 3

Bahamas	57–90	Mexico
Scoring by quarter: 6-23, 14-30, 17-22, 20-15
Pts: Hield 17; Rebs: Coleby 6 Asts: Gray 3		Pts: Martínez 18; Rebs: Ayón 13; Asts: Stoll 5

Auditorio de la Gente, Tepic

August 4

Virgin Islands	80–79	Bahamas
Scoring by quarter: 20-22, 20-19, 26-17, 14-21
Pts: Victor 15; Rebs: Victor 7 Asts: Hodge 5		Pts: Thompson 18; Rebs: Coleby 8 Asts: Hinds 4

Auditorio de la Gente, Tepic

August 4

Mexico	107–64	El Salvador
Scoring by quarter: 23-16, 24-11, 38-16, 22-21
Pts: Stoll 18; Rebs: Zamora 6 Asts: Stoll 5		Pts: Valladares 24; Rebs: Perdomo 5 Asts: Bandek 7

Auditorio de la Gente, Tepic

August 5

El Salvador	70–105	Virgin Islands
Scoring by quarter: 13-32, 19-30, 16-25, 22-18
Pts: A. Arias 16; Rebs: Perdomo 11; Asts: C. Arias 5		Pts: Gray 26; Rebs: Hart 9 Asts: Hodge 5

Auditorio de la Gente, Tepic

August 5

Puerto Rico	65–75	Mexico
Scoring by quarter: 19-15, 16-15, 20-23, 10-22
Pts: Barea 24; Rebs: López-Sosa 7 Asts: Barea 4		Pts: Gutiérrez 24; Rebs: Ayón 6 Asts: Gutiérrez 5

Auditorio de la Gente, Tepic

== Knockout round ==
Semifinals
6 August
Dominican Republic	73
Puerto Rico	78
6 August
Mexico	85
Cuba	70

Final
7 August
Puerto Rico	60
Mexico	74
3rd place
7 August
Dominican Republic	75
Cuba	66

=== Semifinals ===
August 6

Dominican Republic	73–78	Puerto Rico
Scoring by quarter: 15-16, 14-18, 23-17, 21-27
Pts: Santana 14; Rebs: Santana 10; Asts: Coronado 6		Pts: Barea 18; Rebs: Collier 7 Asts: Barea 7

Auditorio de la Gente, Tepic

August 6

Mexico	85–70	Cuba
Scoring by quarter: 25-12, 17-20, 24-19, 19-19
Pts: Ayón 28; Rebs: Ayón 15; Asts: Ayón 6		Pts: Oliva 15; Rebs: Oliva 7 Asts: Oliva 2

Auditorio de la Gente, Tepic

=== Third place playoff ===
August 7

Dominican Republic	75–66	Cuba
Scoring by quarter: 17-18, 17-19, 31-14, 10-15
Pts: Santana 16; Rebs: Santana 8 Asts: Coronado 5		Pts: Haití 12; Rebs: Haití 7 Asts: Oliva 7

Auditorio de la Gente, Tepic

=== Finals ===
August 7

Puerto Rico	60–74	Mexico
Scoring by quarter: 14-16, 21-11, 13-25, 12-22
Pts: Rosario 14; Rebs: Barea 5 Asts: Barea 4		Pts: Ayón 16; Rebs: Ayón 16; Asts: Ayón 4

Auditorio de la Gente, Tepic

2014 Centrobasket winners

Mexico
Third title

== Final rankings ==
The top four teams qualified for the 2015 FIBA Americas Championship. With Mexico being named host, they were automatically qualified for the Championship. This meant an extra spot was open, which was given to the 5th place team, Panama.

Qualifies as host nation
Qualifies to the 2015 FIBA Americas Championship

Rank	Team
1st place, gold medalist(s)	Mexico
2nd place, silver medalist(s)	Puerto Rico
3rd place, bronze medalist(s)	Dominican Republic
4	Cuba
5	Panama
6	Virgin Islands
7	Bahamas
8	Jamaica
9	Costa Rica
10	El Salvador
