= 2025 FIBA COCABA Championship for Women =

Tournament details
- Host country: Nicaragua
- City: Managua
- Dates: 22–27 July
- Teams: 7 (from 1 confederation)
- Venue: 1 (in 1 host city)

Final positions
- Champions: Mexico (5th title)
- Runners-up: El Salvador
- Third place: Nicaragua
- Fourth place: Panama

Tournament statistics
- Games played: 15
- Attendance: 7,035 (469 per game)
- Top scorer: (Nicaragua) Kiyomi McMiller (28.2 ppg)

Official website
- FIBA

The 2025 FIBA COCABA Championship for Women was the tenth edition of this competition, held in Managua, Nicaragua from 22 to 27 July 2025. The tournament was the regional basketball championship of FIBA Americas for the Central American and Caribbean subzone. It also served as a qualifier for the 2026 Centrobasket Women.

Mexico won their fifth title with the final win over El Salvador, 75–56.

== Draw ==
The draw took place on 12 June 2025 at the FIBA Americas’ regional office in Miami, United States.

== Preliminary round ==
All times are local (UTC−6).

=== Group A ===
Pos	Team	Pld	W	L	PF	PA	PD	Pts	Qualification
1	El Salvador	3	3	0	254	156	+98	6	Knockout stage
2	Nicaragua (H)	3	2	1	218	186	+32	5	Knockout stage
3	Honduras	3	1	2	169	233	−64	4	5th–7th place playoffs
4	Costa Rica	3	0	3	151	217	−66	3	5th–7th place playoffs

Source: FIBA
Rules for classification: 1) Points; 2) Head-to-head results; 3) Points difference; 4) Points scored.
(H) Hosts

22 July 2025
17:00

Boxscore

El Salvador	82–35	Honduras
Scoring by quarter: 24–7, 22–12, 18–8, 18–8
Pts: Villalobos 15; Rebs: Vega 11; Asts: Martinez 10		Pts: Rapolo 10; Rebs: Buelto 8 Asts: three players 1

Polideportivo Alexis Argüello, Managua
Attendance: 15
Referees: Carlos Vélez (COL), Romina Ibarra (ARG), João Varella (BRA)

22 July 2025
19:30

Boxscore

Costa Rica	36–61	Nicaragua
Scoring by quarter: 10–16, 8–4, 8–24, 10–17
Pts: Ramírez 11; Rebs: Ramírez 8 Asts: three players 2		Pts: McMiller 25; Rebs: Hodgson, López 9 Asts: McMiller, Peralta 3

Polideportivo Alexis Argüello, Managua
Attendance: 700
Referees: Krishna Domínguez (MEX), Brooke Briscoe (CAN), Carlos Pallares (COL)

23 July 2025
17:00

Boxscore

Honduras	66–64	Costa Rica
Scoring by quarter: 16–20, 13–14, 23–17, 14–13
Pts: Reichle 26; Rebs: Rapolo, Reichle 7 Asts: Rapolo 4		Pts: Ramírez 18; Rebs: Fernández 9 Asts: Martínez 4

Polideportivo Alexis Argüello, Managua
Attendance: 200
Referees: Carlos Vélez (COL), Carlos Pallares (COL), Rebeca Dávila (PUR)

23 July 2025
19:30

Boxscore

Nicaragua	70–82	El Salvador
Scoring by quarter: 21–26, 20–19, 12–22, 17–15
Pts: McMiller 18; Rebs: Salomon 10; Asts: McMiller 6		Pts: Martinez 21; Rebs: Villalobos 16; Asts: Martinez 11

Polideportivo Alexis Argüello, Managua
Attendance: 800
Referees: Krishna Domínguez (MEX), Cooper Toppings (CAN), João Varella (BRA)

24 July 2025
17:00

Boxscore

El Salvador	90–51	Costa Rica
Scoring by quarter: 24–11, 26–12, 20–12, 20–16
Pts: Villalobos 18; Rebs: Villalobos 9 Asts: Martinez 6		Pts: Quesada 16; Rebs: Ramírez 8 Asts: Alvarado 3

Polideportivo Alexis Argüello, Managua
Attendance: 150
Referees: Romina Ibarra (ARG), Carlos Pallares (COL), Brooke Briscoe (CAN)

24 July 2025
19:30

Boxscore

Nicaragua	87–68	Honduras
Scoring by quarter: 17–8, 25–21, 25–20, 20–19
Pts: McMiller 33; Rebs: Thomas 13; Asts: McMiller 8		Pts: Rapolo, Reichle 22; Rebs: Rapolo 10; Asts: Rapolo 7

Polideportivo Alexis Argüello, Managua
Attendance: 350
Referees: Carlos Vélez (COL), Cooper Toppings (CAN), Rebeca Dávila (PUR)

=== Group B ===
Pos	Team	Pld	W	L	PF	PA	PD	Pts	Qualification
1	Mexico	2	2	0	144	84	+60	4	Knockout stage
2	Panama	2	1	1	108	120	−12	3	Knockout stage
3	Guatemala	2	0	2	89	137	−48	2	5th–7th place playoffs

Source: FIBA
Rules for classification: 1) Points; 2) Head-to-head results; 3) Points difference; 4) Points scored.

23 July 2025
14:30

Boxscore

Mexico	67–48	Panama
Scoring by quarter: 15–11, 19–4, 7–18, 26–15
Pts: Lagunas 12; Rebs: Valenzuela 13; Asts: Lagunas 5		Pts: Grenald 12; Rebs: Ponce 6 Asts: González, Reid 2

Polideportivo Alexis Argüello, Managua
Attendance: 100
Referees: Orlando Varela (HON), Brooke Briscoe (CAN), Sarah Rodríguez (HON)

24 July 2025
14:30

Boxscore

Panama	60–53	Guatemala
Scoring by quarter: 20–9, 20–17, 14–10, 6–17
Pts: Grenald 17; Rebs: Vega 10; Asts: González 4		Pts: Pinelo 14; Rebs: Aranki, Chavarria 8 Asts: García, Pinelo 3

Polideportivo Alexis Argüello, Managua
Attendance: 100
Referees: Orlando Varela (HON), João Varella (BRA), Sarah Rodríguez (HON)

25 July 2025
19:30

Boxscore

Guatemala	36–77	Mexico
Scoring by quarter: 6–15, 17–17, 8–20, 5–25
Pts: seven players 4 Rebs: Oliva 4 Asts: García 5		Pts: Gallegos, Valenzuela 13; Rebs: Valenzuela 20; Asts: Ramírez 7

Polideportivo Alexis Argüello, Managua
Attendance: 120
Referees: Cooper Toppings (CAN), Carlos Pallares (COL), João Varella (BRA)

== Knockout stage ==
=== Championship bracket ===
Semi-finals
26 June
A1 El Salvador	68
B2 Panama	43
26 June
B1 Mexico	96
A2 Nicaragua	50

Final
27 June
A1 El Salvador	56
B1 Mexico	75
Third place game
27 June
B2 Panama	49
A2 Nicaragua	59

=== 5th–7th place bracket ===
5th–7th place semifinal
26 June
B3 Guatemala	52
A4 Costa Rica	47

Fifth place game
27 June
A3 Honduras	55
B3 Guatemala	56

=== 5th–7th place semifinal ===
26 July 2025
14:30

Boxscore

Guatemala	52–47	Costa Rica
Scoring by quarter: 16–9, 11–10, 16–15, 9–13
Pts: Chavarria 19; Rebs: García 14; Asts: Pinelo 6		Pts: Quesada 17; Rebs: Fernández 10; Asts: Quesada 4

Polideportivo Alexis Argüello, Managua
Attendance: 100
Referees: Krishna Domínguez (MEX), Carlos Pallares (COL), Rebeca Dávila (PUR)

=== Semifinals ===
26 July 2025
17:00

Boxscore

El Salvador	68–43	Panama
Scoring by quarter: 23–5, 15–12, 12–15, 18–11
Pts: Martinez 17; Rebs: Martínez, Villalobos 9 Asts: Martínez 8		Pts: González 10; Rebs: Vega 8 Asts: Tuttle 2

Polideportivo Alexis Argüello, Managua
Attendance: 100
Referees: Carlos Vélez (COL), Brooke Briscoe (CAN), João Varella (BRA)

26 July 2025
19:30

Boxscore

Mexico	96–50	Nicaragua
Scoring by quarter: 28–7, 28–20, 24–12, 16–11
Pts: Valenzuela 20; Rebs: Valenzuela 16; Asts: three players 4		Pts: McMiller 29; Rebs: Peralta 9 Asts: Peralta 3

Polideportivo Alexis Argüello, Managua
Attendance: 1,500
Referees: Orlando Varela (HON), Romina Ibarra (ARG), Cooper Toppings (CAN)

=== Fifth place game ===
27 July 2025
14:30

Boxscore

Honduras	55–56	Guatemala
Scoring by quarter: 16–8, 17–12, 12–16, 10–20
Pts: Rapolo 20; Rebs: Buelto 13; Asts: Rapalo 5		Pts: Oliva 14; Rebs: Chavarria 13; Asts: Pinelo 8

Polideportivo Alexis Argüello, Managua
Attendance: 100
Referees: Romina Ibarra (ARG), João Varella (BRA), Rebeca Dávila (PUR)

=== Third place game ===
27 July 2025
17:00

Boxscore

Panama	49–59	Nicaragua
Scoring by quarter: 13–12, 16–15, 10–20, 10–12
Pts: Vega 15; Rebs: González, Molinar 7 Asts: three players 3		Pts: McMiller 36; Rebs: Salomon 12; Asts: Romero 5

Polideportivo Alexis Argüello, Managua
Attendance: 800
Referees: Krishna Domínguez (MEX), Carlos Vélez (COL), Cooper Toppings (CAN)

=== Final ===
27 July 2025
19:30

Boxscore

El Salvador	56–75	Mexico
Scoring by quarter: 14–19, 19–16, 10–19, 13–21
Pts: Martinez 22; Rebs: Martínez, Villalobos 10; Asts: Martínez 7		Pts: Lagunas 18; Rebs: Valenzuela 20; Asts: Ramírez 9

Polideportivo Alexis Argüello, Managua
Attendance: 500
Referees: Orlando Varela (HON), Brooke Briscoe (CAN), Carlos Pallares (COL)

== Final standings ==
Rank	Team	Record
1st place, gold medalist(s)	Mexico	4–0
2nd place, silver medalist(s)	El Salvador	4–1
3rd place, bronze medalist(s)	Nicaragua	3–2
4th	Panama	1–3
5th	Guatemala	2–2
6th	Honduras	1–3
7th	Costa Rica	0–4

Qualified for the 2026 Centrobasket Women
