= Garfield Blair =

Jamaican professional basketball player

Personal information
- Born: March 24, 1987 (age 39) Orlando, Florida, U.S.
- Listed height: 6 ft 5 in (1.96 m)

Career information
- High school: Boone (Orlando, Florida)
- College: Stetson (2005–2009)
- NBA draft: 2009: undrafted
- Playing career: 2010–2016
- Position: Shooting guard

Career history
- 2014–2015: Peixefresco
- 2015–2016: AB Castelló

Career highlights
- 2× Second-team All-ASUN (2008, 2009)

Garfield Blair (born March 24, 1987) is a Jamaican professional basketball player. He currently plays for Amics Castelló Sports Club of the LEB Oro in Spain.

He has been a member of the Jamaican national basketball team and participated at the 2014 Centrobasket.
