= Jaguares de Petén =

Jaguares de Peten
- Leagues: LPB
- Founded: 1958
- Location: Peten, Guatemala

The Jaguares de Petén are a Guatemalan professional basketball club that is based in the Petén Department, Guatemala. The club competes in the LPB (Guatemala).

It has provided the Guatemala national basketball team with several key players.

== Notable players ==
- (Guatemala) Ricardo Amaya
- (Guatemala) Pablo Gonzalez
