= Gimnasio Manuel Bernardo Aguirre =

Arena in Chihuahua, Mexico

Coordinates: 28.653688°N 106.085999°W

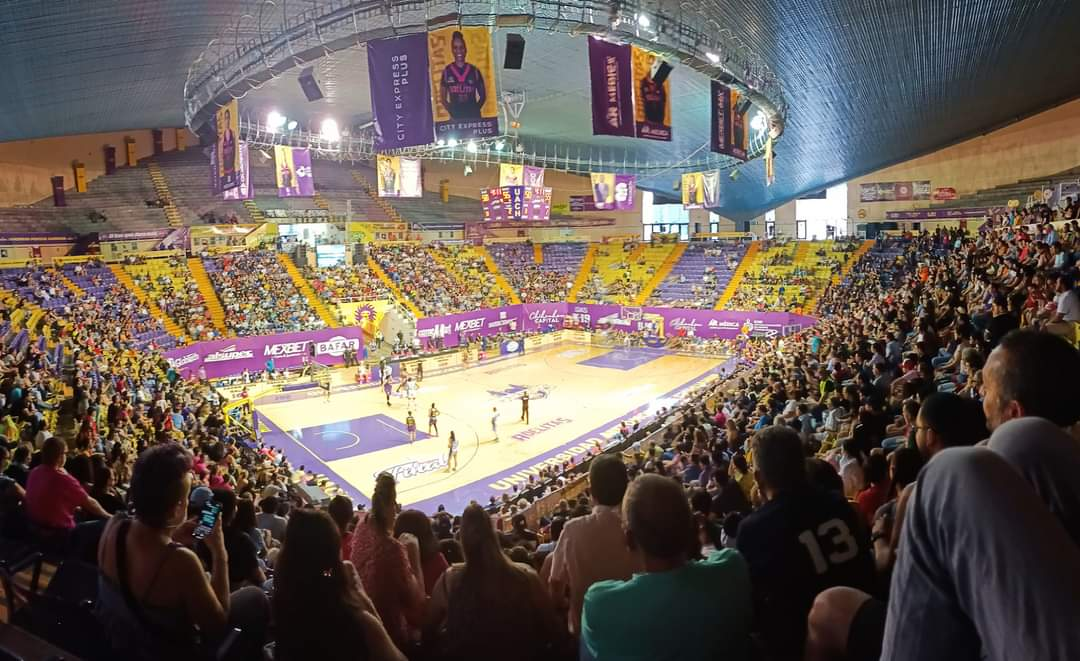
The Arena during the second game of the Sisnova LNPB Women's League Championship Series (July 10, 2022)

Gimnasio Manuel Bernardo Aguirre is an indoor arena in Chihuahua, Chihuahua, Mexico. It is primarily used for basketball and it's the home arena of the Dorados de Chihuahua of the Liga Nacional de Baloncesto Profesional (LNBP). It has also hosted Professional Bull Riders, World Wrestling Entertainment, and concert events. It was inaugurated on 2 October 1980 and has a capacity of 9,600 people.
