= Guatemala men's national basketball team =

Guatemala
- FIBA ranking: 127 (3 March 2026)
- Joined FIBA: 1949
- FIBA zone: FIBA Americas
- National federation: Federación de Baloncesto de Guatemala

Olympic Games
- Appearances: None

FIBA World Cup
- Appearances: None

FIBA AmeriCup
- Appearances: None
Home	Away

The Guatemala National Basketball Team represents Guatemala in international competitions. It is administered by the Guatemala National Basketball Federation (Spanish: Federación Nacional de Baloncesto de Guatemala) (FNBG).

Guatemala is the most populous nation in the Americas that has never qualified for a major international basketball event.

== Current roster ==
At the 2015 COCABA Championship:

Guatemala men's national basketball team roster
Players
Coaches

Pos.	No.	Name	Age – Date of birth	Height	Club	Ctr.
	4	David Monterroso	21 – 31 August 1994	1.95 m (6 ft 5 in)		(Guatemala)
	5	Vinicio Enriquez	24 – 23 April 1991	1.96 m (6 ft 5 in)
	6	Pablo Cano	27 – 17 June 1988	1.78 m (5 ft 10 in)		(Guatemala)
	7	Bernie Diaz	33 – 24 November 1981	1.98 m (6 ft 6 in)		(Guatemala)
	8	Miguel Gonzalez	25 – 7 August 1990	1.83 m (6 ft 0 in)		(Guatemala)
	9	Alejandro Carrillo	27 – 22 April 1988	1.89 m (6 ft 2 in)		(Guatemala)
	10	David Gabriel Goddard Espinoza	26 – 7 January 1989
	11	Jose Zuniga	19 – 4 November 1995	1.80 m (5 ft 11 in)
	13	Oscar Salguero	27 – 23 December 1987	1.93 m (6 ft 4 in)		(Guatemala)
	15	Enrique Samayoa	33 – 16 January 1982	1.96 m (6 ft 5 in)		(Guatemala)
	24	Jose Alberto Zuniga	19 – 4 November 1995	1.93 m (6 ft 4 in)
	25	Juan Rosales	18 – 19 October 1996	1.94 m (6 ft 4 in)

Head coach

Legend

- Club – describes last
  club before the tournament
- Age – describes age
  on 16 September 2015

== See also ==
- Jaguares de Petén
- Guatemala women's national basketball team
