= Trevor Gaskins =

Panamanian professional basketball player (born 1989)

No. 2 – El Calor de Cancún
- Position: Point guard / shooting guard
- League: LNBP

Personal information
- Born: November 24, 1989 (age 36) Columbia, South Carolina, U.S.
- Listed height: 6 ft 2 in (1.88 m)
- Listed weight: 205 lb (93 kg)

Career information
- High school: Milton (Milton, Georgia); Chattahoochee (Johns Creek, Georgia)
- College: Ole Miss (2007–2011); Louisiana Tech (2011–2012)
- NBA draft: 2012: undrafted
- Playing career: 2012–present

Career history
- 2014–2015: Bahía Basket
- 2015: Ferro Carril Oeste
- 2016: Correcaminos Colon
- 2016: Indios de Mayagüez
- 2017–2018: Correcaminos Colon
- 2018: Maccabi Haifa
- 2019–2020: Ciclista Olímpico
- 2020–2021: Quimsa
- 2021–2024: Unifacisa
- 2024–present: El Calor de Cancún

Career highlights
- SEC All-Freshman Team (2008)

Trevor Crosby Gaskins (born November 24, 1989) is a Panamanian professional basketball player for El Calor de Cancún of the Liga Nacional de Baloncesto Profesional, and the Panama national team. He played college basketball at Ole Miss and Louisiana Tech.

== College career ==
As a freshman at Ole Miss, Gaskins averaged 5.9 points, 1.5 rebounds, and 1.1 assists per game, earning Southeastern Conference (SEC) All-Freshman honors. On November 7, 2008, he tore the anterior cruciate ligament in his left knee at practice, forcing him to miss his sophomore season.

After earning his bachelor's degree at Ole Miss, Gaskins filed a waiver with the NCAA to play a graduate season at Louisiana Tech.

== Professional career ==
On February 27, 2018, Gaskins signed with the Israeli team Maccabi Haifa for the rest of the season, joining his former college teammates Zach Graham and Reginald Buckner. Five days later, he made his debut in an 82–77 win over Hapoel Tel Aviv, scoring 17 points off the bench.

In 2024, Gaskins joined El Calor de Cancún, an expansion team in the Liga Nacional de Baloncesto Profesional in Mexico.

=== The Basketball Tournament ===
In 2017, Gaskins played for Ole Hotty Toddy of The Basketball Tournament. Gaskins' team was upset in the first round of the tournament by team NC Prodigal Sons. The Basketball Tournament is an annual $2 million winner-take-all tournament broadcast on ESPN.

== National team career ==
Gaskins represented the Panama men's national basketball team at the 2015 FIBA COCABA Championship in San José, Costa Rica, where he was the tournament's second-best scorer and helped secure the gold medal.
