= Ronnie Aguilar =

American basketball player (born 1987)

Ronnie Amir Aguilar
Personal information
- Born: June 24, 1987 (age 39) Los Angeles, California, U.S.
- Listed height: 7 ft 1 in (2.16 m)
- Listed weight: 250 lb (113 kg)

Career information
- High school: John Marshall (Los Angeles, California)
- College: Colorado State (2006–2010)
- Playing career: 2011–2024

Career history
- 2011: Los Angeles Lakers
- 2013: Los Angeles Lakers
- 2016: Dallas Mavericks
- 2018: Formosa Dreamers
- 2018: Al-Nweidrat
- 2019: Hainan Haixiang
- 2021–2024: China Shanghai Sharks

Ronnie Amir Aguilar Romero (born June 24, 1987) is an American former professional basketball player. He played college basketball for Colorado State and senior year at Cal State Dominguez Hills.

== Early life and career ==
Ronnie Amir Aguilar was born in Los Angeles. Was born to a father from El Salvador and a mother from Honduras. He attended John Marshall High School and was the first In Marshall's History to become an all American with a D1 scholarship. Played his first two years of college basketball for Colorado State.

In 2009, Aguilar transferred to Cal State Dominguez Hills. He started 39 games out of 39 played in two years at Dominguez Hills, averaging 18.4 points and 14.8 rebounds per contest. As a senior, Aguilar helped the Toros set five records that included a 16–1 start, defeating the No. 1 team in the nation, a No. 4 ranking by the NABC, and 10-game win streak and 23 wins in a single season, before being ushered out of the NCAA postseason by BYU-Hawaii, whom the Toros bested during the regular season.

== Professional career ==
Between November and December 2011, Aguilar played six games in the NBA Development League for the Bakersfield Jam, averaging 2.2 points and 4.2 rebounds in 5.9 minutes per game.

On September 27, 2012, Aguilar signed with the Los Angeles Lakers, and continued to play for Dallas Mavericks and many other professional teams.

On March 13, 2016, Aguilar was acquired by the Dallas Mavericks Texas Legends of the NBA Development League. Four days later, he made his debut for the Legends in a 107–105 loss to the Bakersfield Jam, recording one rebound in two minutes off the bench. Sign with Detroit Pistons 2017-18.

In January 2018, Aguilar, sign with Taiwanese basketball team Formosa Dreamers of the ASEAN Basketball League. He replaced Reggie Okosa, who only played two games for the club.

On October 28, 2018, Aguilar signed with Al-Nweidrat of the Bahraini Premier League.

== National team career ==
In 2013, Aguilar led the El Salvador national basketball team to their first medal in international basketball, a silver medal in the 2013 FIBA COCABA Championship. He returned to play for them in 2015, and took them to their first pre-Olympic world tournament in history.

== Personal life ==
Aguilar is the son of Lilian Romero and Gabriel Aguilar. He has two brothers and one sister.
