= Karim Malpica =

Puerto Rican basketball player (born 1978)

Karim Malpica Torres (born August 24, 1978 in Mexico City) is a Puerto Rican professional basketball player. He is a 6'2" guard who plays for Jefes de Fuerza Lagunera in the Liga Nacional de Baloncesto Profesional in Mexico. He is also a member of the Mexico national basketball team.

== Career ==
Malpica has played professionally in Puerto Rico and Mexico. On July 23, 2009, Malpica signed with traditional Mexican League powerhouse Soles de Mexicali.

Malpica is a member of the Mexico national basketball team. He competed for the team at the 2006 and 2008 Centrobasket tournaments. He made his debut at the FIBA Americas Tournament for the team in 2009.
