= El Salvador men's national basketball team =

El Salvador
- FIBA ranking: 101 (2 December 2025)
- Joined FIBA: 1956
- FIBA zone: FIBA Americas
- Coach: Ivan Barahona

Olympic Games
- Appearances: None
- Medals: None

FIBA World Cup
- Appearances: None
- Medals: None

FIBA AmeriCup
- Appearances: None
- Medals: None
Home	Away

The El Salvador national basketball team is the official national representative of El Salvador in international men's basketball. It is governed by the Federación Salvadoreña de Baloncesto (FESABAL).

It plays in the FIBA Americas division, and more specifically, within the Central American region.

Most of its players come from the Liga Mayor de Baloncesto.

== History ==
On April 20, 2021, after five days of play, El Salvador advanced to the second round of 2023 FIBA Basketball World Cup qualification. The week of games were played at the Gimnasio Nacional José Adolfo Pineda in the city of San Salvador.

The hosts took a 68–66 victory over Jamaica, a game in which a loss would have meant elimination. A three-pointer by José Araujo, with 49 seconds remaining sealed the win for El Salvador.

Center Ronnie Aguilar was crucial in defense, as he blocked Kevin Foster at the end of the game and avoided the tie on the scoreboard. Jamaica came close to 67–66. Aguilar was sent to the free throw line and only hit the second shot with two seconds left on the clock. Jamaica was left without any timeouts and ran out of time to take a shot.

The celebration was immediate between players and fans. Roberto Martínez was the offensive leader from El Salvador with 19 points. Aguilar and Araujo added 11 each. Jamaica was led by Omari Johnson with 18 points and Marcel Robinson with 12 points.

== Regional championships ==
=== COCABA championships ===
- 2004 3rd place
- 2007 3rd place
- 2013 2nd place

=== Pan American Games ===
- 1959: 7th place

=== Centrobasket – Central American Championships ===
- 1967 5th place
- 1971 5th place
- 1977 5th place
- 1985 7th place
- 1989 10th place
- 1997 7th place
- 2008 7th place
- 2014 10th place

=== Central American and Caribbean Games ===
- 1959: Gold medal

== Current roster ==
At the 2023 FIBA Basketball World Cup qualification (Americas):

El Salvador men's national basketball team roster
Players
Coaches

Pos.	No.	Name	Age – Date of birth	Height	Club	Ctr.
F	1	Anthony Reyes	18 – 28 May 2002	1.80 m (5 ft 11 in)
	7	Mauricio Lahud	36 – 19 September 1984		Brujos Izalco
G	9	Alejandro Arias	28 – 23 August 1992	1.78 m (5 ft 10 in)	Santa Tecla BC	(El Salvador)
	10	Roberto Martinez	29 – 1 October 1991	1.85 m (6 ft 1 in)
F	12	Carlos Arias	31 – 17 June 1989	2.00 m (6 ft 7 in)	Santa Tecla BC	(El Salvador)
F	13	Brayan Garcia	22 – 3 September 1998	2.00 m (6 ft 7 in)	Santa Tecla BC	(El Salvador)
G	17	Jose Araujo	34 – 17 September 1986	1.86 m (6 ft 1 in)
F	20	Mauricio Aguilar	26 – 20 July 1994	1.95 m (6 ft 5 in)	Santa Tecla BC	(El Salvador)
C	23	Ronnie Aguilar	33 – 24 June 1987	2.06 m (6 ft 9 in)
	24	Luis Valle	23 – 14 August 1997	1.86 m (6 ft 1 in)	Santa Tecla BC
G	26	Eduardo Escalante	28 – 8 April 1993	1.85 m (6 ft 1 in)	San Salvador BC	(El Salvador)
	34	Alvaro Alas	29 – 6 September 1991			(El Salvador)

Legend

- Club – describes last
  club before the tournament
- Age – describes age
  on 19 April 2021.

== Head coach history ==
- (Mexico) Agustín Garcia
- (El Salvador) Adolfo “el Jocote” Rubio (1959)
- (El Salvador) Fito "Jocote" Rubio
- (Spain) Josep Clarós – (1995)
- (El Salvador) Ivan Barahona - (January 2013 – 2014),2017
- (Argentina) Luis Nicoletti (July 2015 - )
- (El Salvador) Ivan Barahona - (-July 2017)
- (Spain) Ray Santana (July 2017- March 2023)

== Past rosters ==
At 2014 Centrobasket:

El Salvador National Basketball Team roster
Players
Coaches

Pos.	No.	Name	Age – Date of birth	Height	Club
F		Oscar Rivera	–	6 ft 3 in (1.91 m)	San Marcos	(El Salvador)
G		Salvador Bandek	–	5 ft 11 in (1.8 m)	San Marcos	(El Salvador)
SG		Fabio Molina	–	6 ft 5 in (1.96 m)	San Marcos	(El Salvador)
G		Mario Flores	–	6 ft 0 in (1.83 m)	ExSAL	(El Salvador)
SG		Edwin Lopez	–	6 ft 0 in (1.83 m)
C		Julio Mancia	–	6 ft 8 in (2.03 m)	UTEC	(El Salvador)
F		Carlos Martinez	–	6 ft 3 in (1.91 m)	UTEC
F/C		James Valladares	–	6 ft 9 in (2.06 m)	Abejas	(Mexico)
G		Jose Araujo	–	6 ft 1 in (1.85 m)	UNBC	(Canada)

Head coach

- Ivan Barahona

Assistant coach(es)

- Arturo Mata
- Roberto Carillo
- Lucas Ramirez-Scout
