= Gimnasio Nacional José Adolfo Pineda =

Indoor arena in San Salvador

Arena José Adolfo Pineda
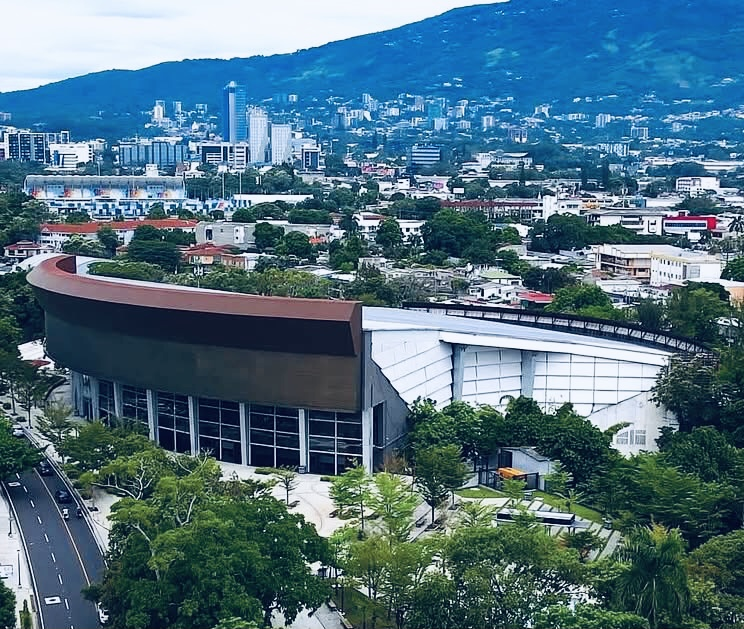
- Interactive map of Arena José Adolfo Pineda
- Location: San Salvador, El Salvador
- Coordinates: 13°41′53″N 89°12′36″W
- Capacity: 12,900

Construction
- Groundbreaking: 1950
- Opened: 1956; 70 years ago

José Adolfo Pineda National Gymnasium is an indoor sporting arena located in San Salvador, El Salvador. The capacity of the arena is 12,900 spectators. It is mainly used to host basketball and other indoor sporting events. The venue hosted the Miss Universe pageant in 1975 and 2023.

Puerto Rican recording artist Ricky Martin performed at the arena on 18 October 2011 for his Música + Alma + Sexo World Tour.

It has been used by the basketball team Santa Tecla BC.

== History ==
Built between 1950 and 1956, named after basketball player José Adolfo Pineda; a notable character who led the national Salvadoran basketball team to win the gold in the Central American and Caribbean Games in 1959, 2002 and 2023. The arena is set to host all matches for the 2027 FIBA Women's AmeriCup.

Preceded by Folk Arts Theater (Philippines) Manila; Ernest N. Morial Convention Center (United States) New Orleans, LA	Miss Universe venue 1975; 2023	Succeeded by Lee Theatre; British Hong Kong; Mexico City Arena; Mexico City
