= Honduras men's national basketball team =

Honduras
- FIBA ranking: 115 (3 March 2026)
- Joined FIBA: 1953
- FIBA zone: FIBA Americas

Olympic Games
- Appearances: None

FIBA World Cup
- Appearances: None

FIBA AmeriCup
- Appearances: None
Home	Away

The Honduras national basketball team is the national basketball team from Honduras. They have yet to appear in the FIBA World Cup or the FIBA AmeriCup.

== Current roster ==
At the 2015 COCABA Championship for Men:

Honduras men's national basketball team roster
Players
Coaches

Pos.	No.	Name	Age – Date of birth	Height	Club	Ctr.
	3	Persly Marin	33 – 29 September 1981	1.92 m (6 ft 4 in)
	4	Marco Banegas	23 – 25 July 1992	1.87 m (6 ft 2 in)		(Honduras)
	6	Alex Alfaro	24 – 15 November 1990	1.82 m (6 ft 0 in)		(Honduras)
	7	Alvin Cacho	28 – 28 April 1987	1.88 m (6 ft 2 in)		(Honduras)
	8	Jorge Pomare	20 – 31 March 1995	1.85 m (6 ft 1 in)		(Honduras)
	9	Cesar Estlign	40 – 23 December 1974	1.98 m (6 ft 6 in)
	10	Pedro Salazar	42 – 31 October 1972	2.04 m (6 ft 8 in)		(Panama)
	11	Christopher Flores	25 – 10 May 1990	1.89 m (6 ft 2 in)
	12	Mario Alcerro	37 – 18 December 1977	2.01 m (6 ft 7 in)		(Honduras)
	13	Omar Cacho	30 – 19 November 1984	1.90 m (6 ft 3 in)		(Honduras)
	14	Felipe Ruiz	34 – 21 December 1980	1.98 m (6 ft 6 in)
	15	Alexander Rubin	27 – 19 April 1988	1.92 m (6 ft 4 in)

Head coach

Assistant coaches

Legend

- Club – describes last
  club before the tournament
- Age – describes age
  on 16 September 2015
