= Costa Rica men's national basketball team =

Costa Rica
- FIBA ranking: 88 ▼5 (3 March 2026)
- Joined FIBA: 1969
- FIBA zone: FIBA Americas
- National federation: Federación Costarricense de Baloncesto Aficionado
- Coach: Jose Nicolas Marín

Olympic Games
- Appearances: None

FIBA World Cup
- Appearances: None

FIBA AmeriCup
- Appearances: None
Home	Away

The Costa Rica national basketball team is the national basketball team from Costa Rica.

Team Costa Rica has never qualified for the FIBA World Cup or the FIBA AmeriCup. Yet, the team has shown strong performances at the regional level. At the 2015 FIBA COCABA Championship, Costa Rica finished the 2nd, its best performance so far.

Judged by the 2020 FIBA Ranking, Costa Rica has the 2nd best basketball national team in Central America, coming only behind Panama.

== History ==
The origins of organized basketball in Costa Rica date to the mid-20th century, when the sport began gaining popularity in San José and other major cities. The men's national team was formed to represent Costa Rica in regional competitions throughout Central America and the Caribbean.

Costa Rica became a regular participant in the FIBA Centrobasket Championship, competing against regional powers such as Puerto Rico, Dominican Republic, and Panama. While the team rarely advanced beyond the preliminary rounds, it established itself as a competitive presence and one of the stronger national teams within Central America.

The 2000s marked a period of growth for Costa Rican basketball at the regional level. The national team won gold medals at the COCABA Championship—the Central American sub-zone tournament—in both **2007** and **2015**, asserting itself as one of the top teams in the sub-region.

Despite these regional accomplishments, Costa Rica has yet to qualify for a FIBA AmeriCup, a FIBA Basketball World Cup, or the Olympic Games. The national program continues to prioritize the development of local talent through the Liga de Baloncesto Superior de Costa Rica and youth-level competitions.

In recent years, Costa Rica has participated in FIBA Basketball World Cup qualification (Americas), competing against stronger teams from across the continent. Although qualification for major tournaments remains a challenge, the team is regarded as a competitive force in Central American basketball and continues to invest in the sport’s nationwide development.

== Competitions ==
=== Summer Olympics ===
Yet to qualify

=== FIBA World Cup ===
Yet to qualify

=== FIBA AmeriCup ===
Yet to qualify

=== Pan American Games ===
Yet to qualify

=== Centrobasket ===
- 1971-1987 : Did not qualify
- 1989 : 7th
- 1991 : 5th
- 1993 : Did not qualify
- 1995 : 7th
- 1997 : Did not qualify
- 1999 : 8th
- 2001 : Did not qualify
- 2003 : 8th
- 2004 : Did not qualify
- 2006 : 8th
- 2008 : 8th
- 2010 : Did not qualify
- 2012 : 9th
- 2014 : 9th
- 2016 : 9th

=== COCABA Championship ===
- 1999 : (bronze)
- 2004 : 5th
- 2006 : (silver)
- 2007 : (silver)
- 2009 : 4th
- 2013 : (bronze)
- 2015 : (silver)

=== Central American and the Caribbean Games ===
- 1926-2002 : ?
- 2006-2010 : Did not participate
- 2014 : ?
- 2018 : Did not participate
- 2022 : To be determined

== Current roster ==
At the 2016 Centrobasket:

Costa Rica men's national basketball team roster
Players
Coaches

Pos.	No.	Name	Age – Date of birth	Height	Club	Ctr.
C	4	Juan Rosich	27 – 23 November 1988	2.06 m (6 ft 9 in)	Coopeservidores Escazu	(Costa Rica)
G	5	Isaac Conejo	22 – 22 May 1994	1.85 m (6 ft 1 in)	Coopenae Arba	(Costa Rica)
C	6	Andres Umana	33 – 2 October 1982	2.03 m (6 ft 8 in)	Super Cable Grecia	(Costa Rica)
G	7	Alonso Sanchez	31 – 30 March 1985	1.75 m (5 ft 9 in)	Brenes Barba	(Costa Rica)
PF	8	Daniel Simmons	36 – 11 June 1980	1.93 m (6 ft 4 in)	Coopenae Arba	(Costa Rica)
SF	9	George Letford	24 – 17 October 1991	1.83 m (6 ft 0 in)	Brenes Barba	(Costa Rica)
C	10	Carlos Quesada	30 – 12 October 1985	1.98 m (6 ft 6 in)	Brenes Barba	(Costa Rica)
PF	11	Daniel Shedden	19 – 11 August 1996	1.90 m (6 ft 3 in)
G	12	Kay Martinez	32 – 21 May 1984	1.98 m (6 ft 6 in)	Brenes Barba	(Costa Rica)
PF	13	Rohel Wilson	26 – 25 August 1989	1.92 m (6 ft 4 in)	Brenes Barba	(Costa Rica)
PF	14	Marcos Castrillo	24 – 29 April 1992	1.98 m (6 ft 6 in)	Coopenae Arba	(Costa Rica)
C	15	Jefny Anderson	32 – 13 July 1983	2.06 m (6 ft 9 in)	Coopenae Arba	(Costa Rica)
SF		Amaurys Ripool	30 – 27 May 1986	1.93 m (6 ft 4 in)	Coopeservidores Escazu	(Costa Rica)

Head coach

- (Costa Rica) Joshua Erickson

Assistant coaches

- (Costa Rica) Edgardo Gamboa

Legend

- Club – describes last
  club before the tournament
- Age – describes age
  on 19 June 2016

At the 2016 Centrobasket in Panama City, Panama, Carlos Quesada played most minutes for Costa Rica whereas Kay Martinez was the team's top scorer and also recorded most steals for the team.

=== Depth chart ===
Pos.	Starting 5	Bench 1	Bench 2	Bench 3
C	Carlos Quesada	Jefny Anderson	Andres Umana	Juan Rosich
PF	Daniel Simmons	Marcos Castrillo	Daniel Shedden
SF	Rohel Wilson	George Letford		Amaurys Ripool
SG	Kay Martinez
PG	Isaac Conejo	Alonso Sanchez

== Head coach position ==
- (Costa Rica) Luis Blanco – 2006
- (United States) Neil Gottlieb – 2007-2008
- (Costa Rica) Luis Blanco – 2009
- (Costa Rica) Jorge Arguello – 2010
- (Costa Rica) Luis Blanco – 2011-2012
- (Costa Rica) Jorge Arguello – 2013
- (Costa Rica) Alexis Monge – 2014
- (Costa Rica) Joshua Erickson – 2015-2016
- (Costa Rica) Alexis Monge – 2017
- (Costa Rica) Daniel Simmons – 2018
- (Nicaragua) Jose Nicolas Marín – 2021-present

== 3x3 Team ==
Costa Rica features 3x3 basketball national teams, from senior level all the way to U12 teams.

== Kit ==
=== Manufacturer ===
2018: Nike

== See also ==
- Costa Rica women's national basketball team
- Costa Rica national under-19 basketball team
- Costa Rica women's national under-19 basketball team
- Costa Rica national 3x3 team
