= 2022 FIBA AmeriCup qualification =

International qualification tournament

Tournament details
- Dates: 24 June 2018 – 20 February 2021
- Teams: 31

Official website
- Qualifiers website Pre-qualifiers website South American pre-qualifiers website Central American pre-qualifiers website Caribbean pre-qualifiers website

The 2022 FIBA AmeriCup qualification was a basketball competition that was played from June 2018 to February 2021, to determine the eleven FIBA Americas nations who would join the automatically qualified host Brazil at the 2022 FIBA AmeriCup.

== Sub-zone pre-qualifiers ==
=== South American Pre-qualifiers ===
Three teams were eligible to participate in the South American pre-qualifiers. Following suspension of Peru, Bolivia and Ecuador played two-legged match with overall winner advanced to the pre-qualifiers.

Team 1	Agg.	Team 2	1st leg	2nd leg
Bolivia	154–132	Ecuador	78–51	76–81

7 August 2018	Bolivia	78–51	Ecuador	Cochabamba
20:00	Scoring by quarter: 21–20, 14–10, 24–12, 19–9
	Pts: Camargo 13; Rebs: Calvo 10; Asts: Arze 7	Boxscore	Pts: three players 8 Rebs: Delgado, Quiñonez 7 Asts: Cárdenas, Guayaquil 2	Arena: Coliseo Polideportivo Evo Morales; Referees: Marcos Benito (BRA), Leandro Lezcano (ARG), Virginia Peruchini (ARG)

12 August 2018	Ecuador	81–76	Bolivia	Quito
20:00	Scoring by quarter: 17–16, 10–17, 27–24, 27–19
	Pts: Álvarez, Carcelen 20; Rebs: Cárdenas, Carcelen 7 Asts: Cárdenas 5	Boxscore	Pts: Ochoa 19; Rebs: Ochoa 9 Asts: Arze 6	Arena: Coliseo Julio César Hidalgo; Referees: Andreia Silva (BRA), Sebastián Negrón (CHI), Felipe Ibarra (CHI)

=== Central American Pre-qualifiers ===
Six teams were eligible to participate in the Central American pre-qualifiers. They were drawn into two groups by three teams. Following withdrawals of Nicaragua, Guatemala and Honduras, only three teams were left to play the Central American pre-qualifiers. Instead, they played single round-robin tournament with winner qualified for the pre-qualifiers.

Pos	Team	Pld	W	L	PF	PA	PD	Pts	Qualification
1	Costa Rica	2	2	0	126	101	+25	4	Pre-qualifiers
2	Belize (H)	2	1	1	123	124	−1	3	
3	El Salvador	2	0	2	116	140	−24	2	

Source: FIBA
Rules for classification: 1) points; 2) head-to-head points; 3) head-to-head points difference; 4) head-to-head number of points scored.
(H) Hosts

21 July 2018	Belize	71–67	El Salvador	Belize City
21:00	Scoring by quarter: 9–12, 22–17, 23–15, 17–23
	Pts: Daly 18; Rebs: García 9 Asts: Lopez 4	Boxscore	Pts: Sandoval 23; Rebs: García 10; Asts: Arias, Sandoval 2	Arena: Belize Civic Centre; Referees: Omar Bermúdez (MEX), Maripier Malo (CAN), Grant Todey (USA)

22 July 2018	El Salvador	49–69	Costa Rica	Belize City
21:00	Scoring by quarter: 16–20, 13–12, 15–22, 5–15
	Pts: Sandoval 22; Rebs: C. Arias 10; Asts: C. Arias 4	Boxscore	Pts: Quesada 14; Rebs: Quesada, Ripool 7 Asts: Conejo 6	Arena: Belize Civic Centre; Referees: Omar Bermúdez (MEX), Nathaniel Saunders (CAN), Grant Todey (USA)

23 July 2018	Belize	52–57	Costa Rica	Belize City
21:00	Scoring by quarter: 13–13, 16–14, 15–14, 8–16
	Pts: García 14; Rebs: Conorque, García 7 Asts: Burgess 4	Boxscore	Pts: Martínez 15; Rebs: Shedden 7 Asts: Wilson 5	Arena: Belize Civic Centre; Referees: Omar Bermúdez (MEX), Maripier Malo (CAN), Nathaniel Saunders (CAN)

=== Caribbean Pre-qualifiers ===
Ten teams participated in the Caribbean pre-qualifiers to qualify for the pre-qualifiers.

==== Group A ====
Pos	Team	Pld	W	L	PF	PA	PD	Pts	Qualification
1	Guyana	4	4	0	365	308	+57	8	Final round
2	Suriname (H)	4	3	1	309	297	+12	7	Final round
3	Grenada	4	2	2	295	317	−22	6	
4	Saint Vincent and the Grenadines	4	1	3	354	344	+10	5	
5	Saint Lucia	4	0	4	261	318	−57	4	

Source: FIBA
Rules for classification: 1) points; 2) head-to-head points; 3) head-to-head points difference; 4) head-to-head number of points scored.
(H) Hosts

24 June 2018	Guyana	93–64	Grenada	Paramaribo
18:00	Scoring by quarter: 23–13, 21–19, 26–17, 23–15
	Pts: Wiggins 18; Rebs: Moe 13; Asts: Rose 2	Boxscore	Pts: La Feuillee, Williams 13; Rebs: Cox, La Feuillee 6 Asts: three players 1	Arena: Anthony Nesty Sporthal; Referees: Gregory Hamilton (CAY), Rebeca Davila (PUR), Carla Peña (DOM)

24 June 2018	Suriname	80–61	Saint Lucia	Paramaribo
21:00	Scoring by quarter: 24–16, 18–16, 15–20, 23–9
	Pts: Leter 23; Rebs: Leter 6 Asts: Watamaleo 5	Boxscore	Pts: Denis 15; Rebs: Polius 12; Asts: Dumurville 5	Arena: Anthony Nesty Sporthal; Referees: José Fernández (CRC), Jennifer Joseph (BAR), José De María (PAN)

25 June 2018	Saint Vincent and the Grenadines	102–104(2OT)	Guyana	Paramaribo
18:45	Scoring by quarter: 26–18, 20–20, 16–24, 19–19, Overtime: 15–15, 6–8
	Pts: Baptiste 26; Rebs: Telesford 15; Asts: Baptiste 3	Boxscore	Pts: Rose 41; Rebs: Webster 12; Asts: three players 2	Arena: Anthony Nesty Sporthal; Referees: Kendell Henry (ISV), Jennifer Joseph (BAR), Bobeth O'Garro (CAY)

25 June 2018	Grenada	67–69	Suriname	Paramaribo
21:00	Scoring by quarter: 23–14, 10–19, 20–24, 14–12
	Pts: Williams 23; Rebs: Regis 12; Asts: Cox 4	Boxscore	Pts: Watamaleo 13; Rebs: Elburg, De Randamie 6 Asts: three players 2	Arena: Anthony Nesty Sporthal; Referees: Gabriel Ramírez (MEX), Carlos Vélez (COL), Shandera Gardiner (BAR)

26 June 2018	Saint Lucia	69–73	Grenada	Paramaribo
14:15	Scoring by quarter: 23–14, 16–17, 16–17, 14–25
	Pts: Denis 18; Rebs: Paul 8 Asts: Denis 6	Boxscore	Pts: Cox 13; Rebs: Regis 9 Asts: Williams 4	Arena: Anthony Nesty Sporthal; Referees: José Fernández (CRC), Jennifer Joseph (BAR), Bobeth O'Garro (CAY)

26 June 2018	Suriname	88–86(OT)	Saint Vincent and the Grenadines	Paramaribo
21:00	Scoring by quarter: 21–18, 12–19, 23–22, 21–18, Overtime: 11–9
	Pts: Leter 33; Rebs: Leter 19; Asts: Van Ams 5	Boxscore	Pts: Telesford 29; Rebs: Telesford 10; Asts: Baptiste 4	Arena: Anthony Nesty Sporthal; Referees: Gregory Hamilton (CAY), Gilbert Bognot (ISV), Rebeca Davila (PUR)

27 June 2018	Saint Vincent and the Grenadines	80–61	Saint Lucia	Paramaribo
14:15	Scoring by quarter: 23–14, 16–23, 17–11, 24–13
	Pts: Telesford 19; Rebs: Baptiste 7 Asts: Baptiste 4	Boxscore	Pts: Denis, Preville 11; Rebs: Calderon 8 Asts: Denis 5	Arena: Anthony Nesty Sporthal; Referees: José De María (PAN), Gilbert Bognot (ISV), Shandera Gardiner (BAR)

27 June 2018	Guyana	83–72	Suriname	Paramaribo
21:00	Scoring by quarter: 10–12, 29–15, 22–22, 22–23
	Pts: Victor 28; Rebs: Victor 10; Asts: Rose 4	Boxscore	Pts: Leter 21; Rebs: De Randamie 10; Asts: Elburg 2	Arena: Anthony Nesty Sporthal; Referees: Gabriel Ramírez (MEX), Jennifer Joseph (BAR), Carlos Vélez (COL)

28 June 2018	Grenada	91–86(OT)	Saint Vincent and the Grenadines	Paramaribo
16:30	Scoring by quarter: 17–22, 23–12, 25–20, 9–20, Overtime: 17–12
	Pts: Cox 22; Rebs: La Feuillee 11; Asts: Cox, Williams 4	Boxscore	Pts: Telesford 22; Rebs: Telesford 13; Asts: Lawrence-Ricks 3	Arena: Anthony Nesty Sporthal; Referees: Gregory Hamilton (CAY), Jennifer Joseph (BAR), Carla Peña (DOM)

28 June 2018	Saint Lucia	70–85	Guyana	Paramaribo
21:00	Scoring by quarter: 15–24, 27–9, 14–17, 14–35
	Pts: Polius 18; Rebs: Polius 15; Asts: Polius 5	Boxscore	Pts: Moe 19; Rebs: Moe 8 Asts: four players 2	Arena: Anthony Nesty Sporthal; Referees: José Fernández (CRC), Bobeth O'Garro (CAY), Rebeca Davila (PUR)

==== Group B ====
Pos	Team	Pld	W	L	PF	PA	PD	Pts	Qualification
1	Antigua and Barbuda	4	4	0	260	199	+61	8	Final round
2	Barbados	4	3	1	271	187	+84	7	Final round
3	Bermuda	4	2	2	248	234	+14	6	
4	Montserrat	4	1	3	189	268	−79	5	
5	Haiti	4	0	4	0	80	−80	4	

Source: FIBA
Rules for classification: 1) points; 2) head-to-head points; 3) head-to-head points difference; 4) head-to-head number of points scored.

24 June 2018	Barbados	20–0	Haiti	Paramaribo
		Boxscore		Arena: Anthony Nesty Sporthal

24 June 2018	Bermuda	78–91	Antigua and Barbuda	Paramaribo
15:45	Scoring by quarter: 9–21, 23–19, 27–23, 19–28
		Boxscore		Arena: Anthony Nesty Sporthal; Referees: Gabriel Ramírez (MEX), Gilbert Bognot (ISV), Shandera Gardiner (BAH)

25 June 2018	Montserrat	66–87	Antigua and Barbuda	Paramaribo
14:15	Scoring by quarter: 12–20, 20–24, 18–26, 16–17
	Pts: Weekes 24; Rebs: Weekes 8 Asts: Kirnon 3	Boxscore	Pts: Zantaya 15; Rebs: Humphreys 11; Asts: Joshua 5	Arena: Anthony Nesty Sporthal; Referees: José Fernández (CRC), Gilbert Bognot (ISV), Rebeca Davila (PUR)

25 June 2018	Barbados	87–78	Bermuda	Paramaribo
16:30	Scoring by quarter: 8–15, 23–23, 31–19, 25–21
	Pts: Marsh 20; Rebs: Marsh 11; Asts: Lockhart 5	Boxscore	Pts: Crumpler 33; Rebs: Lowe 11; Asts: Riley 5	Arena: Anthony Nesty Sporthal; Referees: Gregory Hamilton (CAY), José De María (PAN), Carla Peña (DOM)

26 June 2018	Haiti	0–20	Montserrat	Paramaribo
		Boxscore		Arena: Anthony Nesty Sporthal

26 June 2018	Antigua and Barbuda	62–55	Barbados	Paramaribo
18:45	Scoring by quarter: 16–15, 15–13, 15–17, 16–10
	Pts: Destin 15; Rebs: Humphreys 9 Asts: McCoy 3	Boxscore	Pts: Lockhart 18; Rebs: Marsh, Vanderpool 8 Asts: Gill 4	Arena: Anthony Nesty Sporthal; Referees: Gabriel Ramírez (MEX), Carlos Vélez (COL), Shandera Gardiner (BAR)

27 June 2018	Antigua and Barbuda	20–0	Haiti	Paramaribo
		Boxscore		Arena: Anthony Nesty Sporthal

27 June 2018	Bermuda	72–56	Montserrat	Paramaribo
18:45	Scoring by quarter: 18–13, 18–18, 17–7, 19–18
	Pts: Crumpler 27; Rebs: Lowe, Riley 11; Asts: Riley 4	Boxscore	Pts: Bradshaw 12; Rebs: Silcott 15; Asts: three players 1	Arena: Anthony Nesty Sporthal; Referees: Gregory Hamilton (CAY), Bobeth O'Garro (CAY), Carla Peña (DOM)

28 June 2018	Montserrat	47–109	Barbados	Paramaribo
14:15	Scoring by quarter: 13–27, 11–24, 13–29, 10–29
	Pts: Weekes 15; Rebs: three players 4 Asts: three players 2	Boxscore	Pts: Lockhart 17; Rebs: Bridgeman 7 Asts: Gill, Vanderpool 4	Arena: Anthony Nesty Sporthal; Referees: Kendell Henry (ISV), Carlos Vélez (COL), Shandera Gardiner (BAR)

28 June 2018	Haiti	0–20	Bermuda	Paramaribo
		Boxscore		Arena: Anthony Nesty Sporthal

==== Classification round ====
5–8th place semifinals
29 June
Grenada	88
Montserrat	57
29 June
Bermuda	62
Saint Vincent and the Grenadines	76

Fifth place game
30 June
Grenada	68
Saint Vincent and the Grenadines	82
Seventh place game
30 June
Montserrat	57
Bermuda	47

===== 5–8th place semifinals =====
29 June 2018	Grenada	88–57	Montserrat	Paramaribo
14:15	Scoring by quarter: 18–10, 17–16, 21–20, 32–11
	Pts: St.John 22; Rebs: Regis 15; Asts: Williams 4	Boxscore	Pts: Bradshaw 16; Rebs: White 9 Asts: Wade 3	Arena: Anthony Nesty Sporthal

29 June 2018	Saint Vincent and the Grenadines	76–62	Bermuda	Paramaribo
16:30	Scoring by quarter: 16–14, 20–10, 18–18, 22–20
	Pts: Lawrence-Ricks 17; Rebs: Glasgow 12; Asts: Baptiste 4	Boxscore	Pts: Crumpler 28; Rebs: Riley 12; Asts: Riley 4	Arena: Anthony Nesty Sporthal

===== Ninth place game =====
30 June 2018	Saint Lucia	62–100	Haiti	Paramaribo
12:00	Scoring by quarter: 17–20, 13–25, 6–28, 26–27
	Pts: Polius 14; Rebs: Alcee 9 Asts: three players 2	Boxscore	Pts: Cylla 20; Rebs: Coby 14; Asts: Laroche 9	Arena: Anthony Nesty Sporthal

===== Seventh place game =====
30 June 2018	Montserrat	57–47	Bermuda	Paramaribo
14:15	Scoring by quarter: 13–14, 7–9, 18–15, 19–9
	Pts: Silcott 19; Rebs: Silcott 17; Asts: Murrain 3	Boxscore	Pts: Riley 16; Rebs: Riley 16; Asts: Correia 5	Arena: Anthony Nesty Sporthal; Referees: Gilbert Bognot (ISV), Bobeth O'Garro (CAY), Shandera Gardiner (BAR)

===== Fifth place game =====
30 June 2018	Grenada	68–82	Saint Vincent and the Grenadines	Paramaribo
16:30	Scoring by quarter: 8–20, 19–18, 16–20, 25–24
	Pts: Cox 36; Rebs: Cox 7 Asts: John 3	Boxscore	Pts: Telesford 24; Rebs: Telesford 13; Asts: Glasgow 4	Arena: Anthony Nesty Sporthal; Referees: Jennifer Joseph (BAR), José De María (PAN), Carla Peña (DOM)

==== Final round ====
Semifinals
29 June
Guyana	76
Barbados	71
29 June
Suriname	73
Antigua and Barbuda	76

Final
30 June
Guyana	83
Antigua and Barbuda	70
Third place game
30 June
Barbados	81
Suriname	75

===== Semifinals =====
29 June 2018	Guyana	76–71	Barbados	Paramaribo
18:45	Scoring by quarter: 32–15, 13–26, 15–12, 16–18
	Pts: Victor 25; Rebs: Rose 7 Asts: Burnett, Moe 3	Boxscore	Pts: Lockhart 24; Rebs: Marsh 10; Asts: Gill, Norville 3	Arena: Anthony Nesty Sporthal; Referees: Gregory Hamilton (CAY), Carlos Vélez (COL), Rebeca Davila (PUR)

29 June 2018	Suriname	73–76	Antigua and Barbuda	Paramaribo
21:00	Scoring by quarter: 27–18, 6–18, 22–14, 18–26
	Pts: Leter 28; Rebs: Leter 9 Asts: Van Ams, De Randamie 3	Boxscore	Pts: Zantaya 14; Rebs: Zantaya 8 Asts: McCoy 5	Arena: Anthony Nesty Sporthal

===== Third place game =====
30 June 2018	Barbados	81–75(OT)	Suriname	Paramaribo
18:45	Scoring by quarter: 14–17, 17–20, 21–11, 15–19, Overtime: 14–8
	Pts: Marsh 34; Rebs: Marsh 15; Asts: Lockhart 3	Boxscore	Pts: Watamaleo 20; Rebs: Leter 5 Asts: Leter 4	Arena: Anthony Nesty Sporthal; Referees: Gregory Hamilton (CAY), Carlos Vélez (COL), Rebeca Davila (PUR)

===== Final =====
30 June 2018	Guyana	83–70	Antigua and Barbuda	Paramaribo
21:00	Scoring by quarter: 21–15, 20–24, 23–21, 19–18
	Pts: Rose 23; Rebs: Moe, Rose 7 Asts: Rose 6	Boxscore	Pts: Scott 19; Rebs: Joshua 9 Asts: Davis 5	Arena: Anthony Nesty Sporthal; Referees: José Fernández (CRC), Kendell Henry (ISV), Gabriel Ramírez (MEX)

==== Final standings ====
Rank	Team
1st place, gold medalist(s)	Guyana
2nd place, silver medalist(s)	Antigua and Barbuda
3rd place, bronze medalist(s)	Barbados
4	Suriname
5	Saint Vincent and the Grenadines
6	Grenada
7	Montserrat
8	Bermuda
9	Haiti
10	Saint Lucia

Qualified for the Pre-qualifiers

== Pre-qualifiers ==
Eight teams participated in the Pan-American pre-qualifiers. They were drawn into two groups by four teams. Top two teams from each group advanced to the qualifiers.

All times are local.

=== Group A ===
Pos	Team	Pld	W	L	PF	PA	PD	Pts	Qualification
1	Cuba	3	3	0	293	224	+69	6	Qualifiers
2	Bahamas	3	2	1	270	216	+54	5	Qualifiers
3	Belize (H)	3	1	2	248	239	+9	4	
4	Antigua and Barbuda	3	0	3	197	329	−132	3	

Source: FIBA
Rules for classification: 1) points; 2) head-to-head points; 3) head-to-head points difference; 4) head-to-head number of points scored.
(H) Hosts

22 February 2019	Bahamas	74–88	Cuba	Belize City
18:00	Scoring by quarter: 19–29, 20–13, 24–32, 11–14
	Pts: Carey 14; Rebs: Cleare 9 Asts: Cadot 6	Boxscore	Pts: Rivero 22; Rebs: Justiz 13; Asts: Oliva 7	Arena: Belize Civic Centre; Referees: Grant Todey (USA), Jarby Loaiza (CRC), Allan Mercado (NCA)

22 February 2019	Belize	96–71	Antigua and Barbuda	Belize City
20:30	Scoring by quarter: 24–17, 26–18, 20–20, 26–16
	Pts: Troyer 20; Rebs: Lopez 8 Asts: Mitchell 8	Boxscore	Pts: James 18; Rebs: James 10; Asts: four players 2	Arena: Belize Civic Centre; Referees: Gabriel Ramírez (MEX), Carlos Vélez (COL), Orlando Varela (HON)

23 February 2019	Antigua and Barbuda	56–110	Bahamas	Belize City
18:00	Scoring by quarter: 14–37, 12–19, 13–27, 17–27
	Pts: Edwards 23; Rebs: three players 5 Asts: K. Braithwaite, McIntosh 3	Boxscore	Pts: Carey 29; Rebs: Barry 8 Asts: Nairn Jr. 10	Arena: Belize Civic Centre; Referees: Carlos Vélez (COL), Allan Mercado (NCA), Orlando Varela (HON)

23 February 2019	Cuba	82–80	Belize	Belize City
20:30	Scoring by quarter: 23–16, 11–20, 29–22, 19–22
	Pts: Rivero 29; Rebs: Mensia 10; Asts: three players 3	Boxscore	Pts: Daly 23; Rebs: Troyer 9 Asts: Lopez 5	Arena: Belize Civic Centre; Referees: Gabriel Ramírez (MEX), Grant Todey (USA), Jarby Loaiza (CRC)

24 February 2019	Cuba	123–70	Antigua and Barbuda	Belize City
18:00	Scoring by quarter: 21–20, 27–16, 39–16, 36–18
	Pts: Valdés 24; Rebs: Justiz 15; Asts: Rodriguez 9	Boxscore	Pts: S. Braithwaite 26; Rebs: Jackson, S. Braithwaite 4 Asts: S. Braithwaite 6	Arena: Belize Civic Centre; Referees: Orlando Varela (HON), Allan Mercado (NCA), Jarby Loaiza (CRC)

24 February 2019	Belize	72–86	Bahamas	Belize City
20:30	Scoring by quarter: 19–22, 23–20, 13–22, 17–22
	Pts: Conorque 23; Rebs: Lopez, Troyer 7 Asts: Lopez 4	Boxscore	Pts: Carey 19; Rebs: Smith 12; Asts: Smith 3	Arena: Belize Civic Centre; Referees: Gabriel Ramírez (MEX), Grant Todey (USA), Carlos Vélez (COL)

=== Group B ===
Pos	Team	Pld	W	L	PF	PA	PD	Pts	Qualification
1	Colombia (H)	3	3	0	291	201	+90	6	Qualifiers
2	Paraguay	3	2	1	250	219	+31	5	Qualifiers
3	Guyana	3	1	2	194	272	−78	4	
4	Bolivia	3	0	3	189	232	−43	3	

Source: FIBA
Rules for classification: 1) points; 2) head-to-head points; 3) head-to-head points difference; 4) head-to-head number of points scored.
(H) Hosts

22 February 2019	Paraguay	93–53	Guyana	Tunja
17:30	Scoring by quarter: 27–1, 24–18, 16–16, 26–18
	Pts: Zanotti 15; Rebs: Araujo, Mellone 5 Asts: Ljubetich 6	Boxscore	Pts: Moe 13; Rebs: Moe 11; Asts: Rose 2	Arena: Coliseo Cubierto San Antonio; Referees: Alexis Mercado (PUR), Kendell Henry (ISV), Maximo Cruz (DOM)

22 February 2019	Colombia	84–51	Bolivia	Tunja
20:00	Scoring by quarter: 19–12, 19–19, 31–8, 15–12
	Pts: Angola 18; Rebs: Jackson 7 Asts: Jackson 3	Boxscore	Pts: Choque 13; Rebs: Choque 6 Asts: Arze, Olguin 2	Arena: Coliseo Cubierto San Antonio; Referees: Héctor Sánchez (USA), Mauricio Chinchilla (CRC), Roberto Mota (DOM)

22 February 2019	Bolivia	73–75	Paraguay	Tunja
16:30	Scoring by quarter: 16–14, 26–18, 12–19, 19–24
	Pts: Camargo 17; Rebs: Mercado 8 Asts: Ochoa 5	Boxscore	Pts: Araujo 22; Rebs: Bareiro, Zanotti 9 Asts: Bareiro 4	Arena: Coliseo Cubierto San Antonio; Referees: Héctor Sánchez (USA), Maximo Cruz (DOM), Mauricio Chinchilla (CRC)

22 February 2019	Guyana	68–114	Colombia	Tunja
19:00	Scoring by quarter: 22–21, 11–25, 23–32, 12–36
	Pts: Moe 17; Rebs: Moe 12; Asts: Rose 5	Boxscore	Pts: Angola 26; Rebs: Almanza 11; Asts: Jackson 7	Arena: Coliseo Cubierto San Antonio; Referees: Alexis Mercado (PUR), Kendell Henry (ISV), Roberto Mota (DOM)

22 February 2019	Guyana	73–65	Bolivia	Tunja
16:30	Scoring by quarter: 16–19, 19–21, 18–15, 20–10
	Pts: Moe 16; Rebs: Rose 13; Asts: Webster 4	Boxscore	Pts: Camargo 22; Rebs: Choque 11; Asts: Camargo 4	Arena: Coliseo Cubierto San Antonio; Referees: Kendell Henry (ISV), Mauricio Chinchilla (CRC), Roberto Mota (DOM)

22 February 2019	Colombia	93–82	Paraguay	Tunja
19:00	Scoring by quarter: 27–25, 29–24, 24–15, 13–18
	Pts: Angola 28; Rebs: Angola 6 Asts: Jackson 4	Boxscore	Pts: Riveros 21; Rebs: Riveros 9 Asts: Riveros 4	Arena: Coliseo Cubierto San Antonio; Referees: Alexis Mercado (PUR), Maximo Cruz (DOM), Héctor Sánchez (USA)

== Qualifiers ==
=== Draw ===
The draw was held on 23 July 2019.

==== Seeding ====
The seedings were announced on 19 July 2019.

Pot 1	Pot 2	Pot 3	Pot 4	Pot 5	Pot 6	Pot 7	Pot 8
Argentina; Brazil	United States; Canada	Venezuela; Uruguay	Puerto Rico; Dominican Republic	Panama; Chile	Mexico; Virgin Islands	Paraguay; Colombia	Bahamas; Cuba

=== Groups ===
All times are local.

Due to the COVID-19 pandemic, each group played the November 2020 window at a single venue. The same will be done for the February 2021 window.

==== Group A ====
Pos	Team	Pld	W	L	PF	PA	PD	Pts	Qualification
1	Venezuela	6	5	1	446	396	+50	11	2022 FIBA AmeriCup
2	Argentina	6	4	2	445	410	+35	10	2022 FIBA AmeriCup
3	Colombia	6	2	4	391	414	−23	8	2022 FIBA AmeriCup
4	Chile	6	1	5	370	430	−60	7	

Source: FIBA
Rules for classification: 1) points; 2) head-to-head points; 3) head-to-head points difference; 4) head-to-head number of points scored.

20 February 2020	Argentina	68–74	Venezuela	San Luis
20:00	Scoring by quarter: 21–20, 14–11, 20–17, 13–26
	Pts: Acuña 15; Rebs: Acuña, González 4 Asts: four players 2	Boxscore	Pts: Carrera 33; Rebs: Carrera 13; Asts: Cubillán 3	Arena: Estadio Ave Fénix; Attendance: 3,100; Referees: Jorge Vázquez (PUR), Gonzalo Salgueiro (URU), Diego Chiconato (BRA)

20 February 2020	Chile	59–60	Colombia	Valdivia
21:00	Scoring by quarter: 13–12, 18–10, 22–22, 6–16
	Pts: Herrera 15; Rebs: Carrión 11; Asts: Morales 5	Boxscore	Pts: Palacios 13; Rebs: Palacios 11; Asts: Palacios 4	Arena: Coliseo Municipal Antonio Azurmendy Riveros; Attendance: 3,600; Referees: Roberto Vázquez (PUR), Marcos Benoti (BRA), Andrés Bartel (URU)

23 February 2020	Venezuela	72–73	Argentina	Caracas
17:00	Scoring by quarter: 19–17, 17–10, 26–24, 10–22
	Pts: G. Vargas 16; Rebs: G. Vargas 12; Asts: G. Vargas 5	Boxscore	Pts: Barral 11; Rebs: three players 4 Asts: Barral 6	Arena: Poliedro de Caracas; Attendance: 9,678; Referees: Marcos Benito (BRA), Andrés Bartel (URU), Nicolas Flores (PAR)

23 February 2020	Colombia	57–64	Chile	Tunja
19:00	Scoring by quarter: 7–13, 12–13, 19–22, 19–16
	Pts: Atencia 16; Rebs: Trocha 12; Asts: Atencia, Trocha 3	Boxscore	Pts: S. Suárez 17; Rebs: Herrera 8 Asts: Morales 6	Arena: Coliseo Cubierto San Antonio; Attendance: 2,000; Referees: Cristiano Maranho (BRA), Jesed Diaz (PUR), Gonzalo Salgueiro (URU)

27 November 2020	Venezuela	73–69	Colombia	Buenos Aires, Argentina
15:10	Scoring by quarter: 23–21, 7–13, 26–15, 17–20
	Pts: Chourio 13; Rebs: Graterol 7 Asts: Guillent 10	Boxscore	Pts: Angola 19; Rebs: Trocha 9 Asts: Atencia 5	Arena: Estadio Obras Sanitarias; Referees: Carlos Peralta (ECU), Gonzalo Salgueiro (URU), Fernando Leite (BRA)

27 November 2020	Argentina	67–61	Chile	Buenos Aires
21:10	Scoring by quarter: 20–16, 11–18, 16–13, 20–14
	Pts: Fjellerup 14; Rebs: Schattmann 6 Asts: Aguerre 6	Boxscore	Pts: M. Suárez 21; Rebs: Carvacho 16; Asts: Carvacho, Morales 2	Arena: Estadio Obras Sanitarias; Referees: Marcos Benito (BRA), Andreia Silva (BRA), Nicolás Flores (PAR)

28 November 2020	Venezuela	86–77(OT)	Chile	Buenos Aires, Argentina
16:10	Scoring by quarter: 15–10, 18–18, 20–25, 11–11, Overtime: 10–10, 12–3
	Pts: Carrera 22; Rebs: three players 8 Asts: Guillent 11	Boxscore	Pts: Carvacho 20; Rebs: Carvacho 10; Asts: Morales 7	Arena: Estadio Obras Sanitarias; Referees: Andreia Silva (BRA), Carlos Peralta (ECU), Gonzalo Salgueiro (URU)

28 November 2020	Argentina	75–67	Colombia	Buenos Aires
22:10	Scoring by quarter: 24–17, 20–27, 15–8, 16–15
	Pts: Schattmann 14; Rebs: Saiz 12; Asts: Vildoza, Zurbriggen 3	Boxscore	Pts: Angola 17; Rebs: Angola, Trocha 9 Asts: five players 2	Arena: Estadio Obras Sanitarias; Referees: Marcos Benito (BRA), Nicolás Flores (PAR), Ramiro Marques (BRA)

21 February 2021	Colombia	67–80	Venezuela	Cali
17:10	Scoring by quarter: 16–21, 20–16, 15–25, 16–18
	Pts: Atencia 13; Rebs: Tello Palacios 8 Asts: Tello Palacios 4	Boxscore	Pts: J. Vargas 24; Rebs: Colmenares 10; Asts: Guillent 8	Arena: Coliseo Evangelista Mora; Referees: Roberto Vázquez (PUR), Alexis Mercado (PUR), Nicolás Flores (PAR)

21 February 2021	Chile	65–99	Argentina	Cali, Colombia
20:10	Scoring by quarter: 10–32, 19–22, 19–25, 17–20
	Pts: Arroyo 16; Rebs: Carvacho 7 Asts: Arroyo 4	Boxscore	Pts: Aguerre 18; Rebs: Vildoza 5 Asts: Fjellerup 6	Arena: Coliseo Evangelista Mora; Referees: Andrés Bartel (URU), Jesed Díaz (PUR), Norval Young (ISV)

22 February 2021	Colombia	71–63	Argentina	Cali
18:10	Scoring by quarter: 15–19, 15–14, 16–17, 25–13
	Pts: Atencia 17; Rebs: Ibarguen, Tello Palacios 9 Asts: Atencia 3	Boxscore	Pts: Vildoza 15; Rebs: Aguerre 7 Asts: Vildoza 6	Arena: Coliseo Evangelista Mora; Referees: Roberto Vázquez (PUR), Jesed Díaz (PUR), Gonzalo Salgueiro (URU)

22 February 2021	Chile	44–61	Venezuela	Cali, Colombia
21:10	Scoring by quarter: 9–21, 15–13, 7–14, 13–13
	Pts: Carvacho 12; Rebs: Carvacho 16; Asts: Carrasco 4	Boxscore	Pts: Colmenares 14; Rebs: Colmenares 18; Asts: G. Vargas 5	Arena: Coliseo Evangelista Mora; Referees: Andrés Bartel (URU), Alexis Mercado (PUR), Kristian Páez (ECU)

==== Group B ====
Pos	Team	Pld	W	L	PF	PA	PD	Pts	Qualification
1	Uruguay	6	3	3	478	471	+7	9	2022 FIBA AmeriCup
2	Brazil	4	4	0	316	269	+47	8 (Note: Brazil 77–71 Panama)	2022 FIBA AmeriCup
3	Panama	5	3	2	372	367	+5	8	2022 FIBA AmeriCup
4	Paraguay	5	0	5	356	415	−59	5	

Source: FIBA
Rules for classification: 1) points; 2) head-to-head points; 3) head-to-head points difference; 4) head-to-head number of points scored.
Notes:

21 February 2020	Brazil	83–72	Uruguay	São José dos Pinhais
19:30	Scoring by quarter: 22–23, 16–14, 28–18, 17–17
	Pts: Demétrio, Dos Santos 15; Rebs: Mineiro 11; Asts: Luz 7	Boxscore	Pts: Fitipaldo 19; Rebs: Batista 5 Asts: Parodi 6	Arena: Ginásio Max Rosenmann; Attendance: 3,796; Referees: Fabricio Vito (ARG), Daniel García (VEN), Rodrigo Mejía (COL)

21 February 2020	Panama	82–79	Paraguay	Panama City
20:30	Scoring by quarter: 24–17, 18–18, 11–18, 29–26
	Pts: Carter 20; Rebs: Bishop 11; Asts: Rodríguez 8	Boxscore	Pts: Peralta 19; Rebs: Dose 8 Asts: Zanotti 5	Arena: Roberto Durán Arena; Attendance: 1,000; Referees: Michael Weiland (CAN), Juan Fernández (ARG), Jesed Díaz (PUR)

24 February 2020	Paraguay	66–75	Panama	Asunción
20:00	Scoring by quarter: 13–21, 10–18, 26–17, 17–19
	Pts: Riveros 16; Rebs: Peralta 14; Asts: Riveros 2	Boxscore	Pts: Oglivie 15; Rebs: Bishop 11; Asts: four players 2	Arena: SND Arena; Referees: Jorge Vázquez (PUR), Fabricio Vito (ARG), Daniel García (VEN)

24 February 2020	Uruguay	76–83(OT)	Brazil	Montevideo
21:00	Scoring by quarter: 22–17, 15–23, 10–20, 21–8, Overtime: 8–15
	Pts: Fitipaldo 30; Rebs: Batista 12; Asts: Batista, Parodi 5	Boxscore	Pts: De Paula 18; Rebs: Demétrio 6 Asts: De Paula 5	Arena: Antel Arena; Referees: Roberto Vázquez (PUR), Danilo Molina (ARG), Kristian Páez (ECU)

27 November 2020	Brazil	77–71	Panama	Buenos Aires, Argentina
12:10	Scoring by quarter: 19–15, 21–20, 17–10, 20–26
	Pts: Pacheco 17; Rebs: Carvalho 11; Asts: Dias, Pacheco 4	Boxscore	Pts: Bishop 18; Rebs: Mitchell 9 Asts: Ty. Gaskins 4	Arena: Estadio Obras Sanitarias; Referees: Juan Fernández (ARG), Daniel García (VEN), Leonardo Zalazar (ARG)

27 November 2020	Uruguay	97–77	Paraguay	Buenos Aires, Argentina
18:10	Scoring by quarter: 32–8, 10–20, 21–23, 34–26
	Pts: Parodi, Serres 18; Rebs: Serres 6 Asts: Parodi 12	Boxscore	Pts: Riveros 16; Rebs: López 10; Asts: Martínez 3	Arena: Estadio Obras Sanitarias; Referees: Fabricio Vito (ARG), Felipe Ibarra (CHI), Sebastián Negrón (CHI)

28 November 2020	Brazil	73–50	Paraguay	Buenos Aires, Argentina
13:10	Scoring by quarter: 30–5, 16–22, 13–15, 14–8
	Pts: Pacheco 18; Rebs: Dias 11; Asts: Santos 5	Boxscore	Pts: Fabio 12; Rebs: Fabio 10; Asts: Martínez 3	Arena: Estadio Obras Sanitarias; Referees: Fabricio Vito (ARG), Leonardo Zalazar (ARG), Daniel García (VEN)

28 November 2020	Uruguay	74–67	Panama	Buenos Aires, Argentina
19:10	Scoring by quarter: 14–17, 27–10, 10–18, 23–22
	Pts: Cabot 17; Rebs: Wachsmann 11; Asts: Vidal 5	Boxscore	Pts: Tr. Gaskins 17; Rebs: Mitchell 14; Asts: Tr. Gaskins, Oglivie 2	Arena: Estadio Obras Sanitarias; Referees: Juan Fernández (ARG), Felipe Ibarra (CHI), Franco Ronconi (ARG)

21 February 2021	Paraguay	84–88	Uruguay	Cali, Colombia
11:10	Scoring by quarter: 24–19, 22–19, 9–30, 29–20
	Pts: Riveros 17; Rebs: three players 4 Asts: Riveros 6	Boxscore	Pts: Cabot 22; Rebs: Serres 8 Asts: Cabot 6	Arena: Coliseo Evangelista Mora; Referees: Leandro Lezcano (ARG), Daniel García (VEN), Kristian Páez (ECU)

22 February 2021	Panama	77–71	Uruguay	Cali, Colombia
12:10	Scoring by quarter: 15–28, 20–24, 15–12, 27–7
	Pts: Bishop 19; Rebs: Bishop 11; Asts: Bishop 5	Boxscore	Pts: Haller 17; Rebs: Wachsmann 11; Asts: Cabot 7	Arena: Coliseo Evangelista Mora; Referees: Leandro Lezcano (ARG), Daniel García (VEN), Rodrigo Mejía (COL)

Canceled (Note: The matches, originally scheduled for the February 2021 window, were postponed after Brazil had their entry to Colombia denied by national health authorities. They were later canceled.)	Paraguay	vs.	Brazil
		Boxscore

Canceled	Panama	vs.	Brazil
		Boxscore

==== Group C ====
Pos	Team	Pld	W	L	PF	PA	PD	Pts	Qualification
1	Canada	6	5	1	363	343	+20	11 (Note: Canada 173–160 Dominican Republic)	2022 FIBA AmeriCup
2	Dominican Republic	6	5	1	448	407	+41	11	2022 FIBA AmeriCup
3	Virgin Islands	6	1	5	501	537	−36	7	2022 FIBA AmeriCup
4	Cuba (Note: Cuba forfeited their last three games for non-appearance of the games and zero points were awarded.)	6	1	5	215	240	−25	4	

Source: FIBA
Rules for classification: 1) points; 2) head-to-head points; 3) head-to-head points difference; 4) head-to-head number of points scored.
Notes:

21 February 2020	Canada	89–72	Dominican Republic	Oshawa
19:05	Scoring by quarter: 17–22, 18–18, 30–18, 24–14
	Pts: Nicholson 16; Rebs: Nicholson 7 Asts: Kajami-Keane 8	Boxscore	Pts: Liz 16; Rebs: Delgado 8 Asts: Solano 6	Arena: Campus Recreation and Wellness Centre; Referees: Leandro Lezcano (ARG), Julio Anaya (PAN), Alexis Mercado (PUR)

21 February 2020	Cuba	64–80	Virgin Islands	Havana
20:00	Scoring by quarter: 18–22, 14–14, 19–22, 13–22
	Pts: Guzmán 14; Rebs: Cubilla 7 Asts: Oliva 3	Boxscore	Pts: Hodge 22; Rebs: Hodge, Smith 8 Asts: Hodge 6	Arena: Coliseo de la Ciudad Deportiva; Referees: Andreia Silva (BRA), Mauricio Chinchilla (CRC), Roberto Mota (DOM)

24 February 2020	Virgin Islands	64–91	Cuba	Saint Thomas
19:00	Scoring by quarter: 10–22, 16–20, 17–19, 21–30
	Pts: Hodge 23; Rebs: Jackson 12; Asts: Hodge 4	Boxscore	Pts: Cubilla 21; Rebs: Cubilla 19; Asts: Molina 9	Arena: Sports and Fitness Center; Referees: Alexis Mercado (PUR), Carlos Peralta (ECU), Ramiro Marques (BRA)

24 February 2020	Dominican Republic	88–84(OT)	Canada	Santo Domingo
20:00	Scoring by quarter: 22–16, 17–17, 11–19, 25–23, Overtime: 13–9
	Pts: Vargas 16; Rebs: Solano 6 Asts: Solano 8	Boxscore	Pts: Scrubb 26; Rebs: Klassen 9 Asts: Kajami-Keane 7	Arena: Palacio de los Deportes; Referees: Juan Fernández (ARG), Andreia Silva (BRA), Christian Wilmore (BAH)

29 November 2020	Virgin Islands	75–89	Dominican Republic	Punta Cana, Dominican Republic
17:30	Scoring by quarter: 17–24, 14–25, 27–27, 17–13
	Pts: Milligan 20; Rebs: Aska, Hodge 8 Asts: Hodge 8	Boxscore	Pts: Vargas 23; Rebs: Delgado, Vargas 12; Asts: Solano 7	Arena: Hard Rock Fillmore Ballroom; Referees: Jorge Vázquez (PUR), Roberto Vázquez (PUR), Alexis Mercado (PUR)

30 November 2020	Cuba	60–96	Dominican Republic	Punta Cana, Dominican Republic
20:30	Scoring by quarter: 16–23, 13–18, 26–23, 5–32
	Pts: Guzmán 20; Rebs: Cubilla 11; Asts: Oliva 3	Boxscore	Pts: Henríquez 19; Rebs: Delgado 11; Asts: Solano 7	Arena: Hard Rock Fillmore Ballroom; Referees: Roberto Vázquez (PUR), Alexis Mercado (PUR), Jesed Díaz (PUR)

17 February 2021 (Note: The match, originally scheduled for the November 2020 window, was postponed.)	Virgin Islands	93–95	Canada	San Juan, Puerto Rico
20:00	Scoring by quarter: 20–28, 26–19, 23–27, 24–21
	Pts: Hodge 28; Rebs: Aska, Smith 8 Asts: Hodge 7	Boxscore	Pts: Best 28; Rebs: Bennett, Klassen 8 Asts: Kajami-Keane 9	Arena: Roberto Clemente Coliseum; Referees: Jorge Vázquez (PUR), Carlos Peralta (ECU), Christian Wilmore (BAH)

19 February 2021	Dominican Republic	103–99(OT)	Virgin Islands	San Juan, Puerto Rico
14:00	Scoring by quarter: 22–27, 26–14, 28–22, 18–31, Overtime: 9–5
	Pts: Liz 20; Rebs: Vargas 13; Asts: Torres 11	Boxscore	Pts: Hodge 27; Rebs: Aska 11; Asts: Hodge 12	Arena: Roberto Clemente Coliseum; Referees: Juan Fernández (ARG), Grant Todey (USA), Christian Wilmore (BAH)

20 February 2021	Canada	95–90	Virgin Islands	San Juan, Puerto Rico
14:30	Scoring by quarter: 20–18, 23–17, 25–29, 27–26
	Pts: Kajami-Keane 27; Rebs: Scrubb 11; Asts: Kajami-Keane 9	Boxscore	Pts: Hodge 44; Rebs: Aska 8 Asts: Edwin 4	Arena: Roberto Clemente Coliseum; Referees: Jorge Vázquez (PUR), Grant Todey (USA), Juan Fernández (ARG)

Canceled (Note: The match, originally scheduled for the November 2020 window was postponed. The match was rescheduled for February 2021, but was postponed again after Cuba failed to travel to Puerto Rico.)	Cuba	0–20 (Note: After the matches could not be played by Cuba, FIBA decided on 4 March 2021 to forfeit the games in favour of the opposing teams.)	Canada
		Boxscore

Canceled (Note: The matches, originally scheduled for the February 2021 window, were postponed after Cuba failed to travel to Puerto Rico.)	Dominican Republic	20–0	Cuba
		Boxscore

Canceled	Canada	20–0	Cuba
		Boxscore

==== Group D ====
Pos	Team	Pld	W	L	PF	PA	PD	Pts	Qualification
1	United States	6	6	0	560	432	+128	12	2022 FIBA AmeriCup
2	Puerto Rico	6	3	3	472	511	−39	9	2022 FIBA AmeriCup
3	Mexico	6	2	4	438	463	−25	8	2022 FIBA AmeriCup
4	Bahamas	6	1	5	455	519	−64	7	

Source: FIBA
Rules for classification: 1) points; 2) head-to-head points; 3) head-to-head points difference; 4) head-to-head number of points scored.

20 February 2020	Puerto Rico	70–83	United States	San Juan
20:00	Scoring by quarter: 14–33, 10–18, 26–14, 20–18
	Pts: Clavell 24; Rebs: Piñeiro 9 Asts: Browne 8	Boxscore	Pts: Jones 16; Rebs: Jones 11; Asts: Fogg, Mika 4	Arena: Roberto Clemente Coliseum; Attendance: 7,800; Referees: Cristiano Maranho (BRA), Carlos Peralta (ECU), Ramiro Marques (BRA)

20 February 2020	Mexico	75–61	Bahamas	Guadalajara
20:00	Scoring by quarter: 18–11, 23–19, 24–11, 10–20
	Pts: De Haro 17; Rebs: Jaimes 12; Asts: Cruz 6	Boxscore	Pts: Munnings 16; Rebs: Nesbitt 7 Asts: Bridgewater 3	Arena: Arena Astros; Attendance: 3,958; Referees: Nathaniel Saunders (CAN), Michael Scott (CAN), Carlos Vélez (COL)

23 February 2020	United States	95–73	Puerto Rico	Washington, D.C.
15:00	Scoring by quarter: 26–11, 24–18, 21–17, 24–´27
	Pts: Fogg 18; Rebs: Webb 10; Asts: Fogg 8	Boxscore	Pts: Piñeiro, Sosa 15; Rebs: Piñeiro 10; Asts: Browne 5	Arena: Entertainment and Sports Arena; Attendance: 3,030; Referees: Leandro Lezcano (ARG), Julio Anaya (PAN), Nathaniel Saunders (CAN)

23 February 2020	Bahamas	76–59	Mexico	Nassau
20:00	Scoring by quarter: 20–15, 18–15, 20–8, 18–21
	Pts: Bridgewater 15; Rebs: Thompson 8 Asts: Cornish 6	Boxscore	Pts: Cruz 21; Rebs: Gutiérrez 6 Asts: Solares 4	Arena: Atlantis Arena; Attendance: 1,000; Referees: Michael Weiland (CAN), José Fernández (CRC), Norval Young (ISV)

29 November 2020	United States	99–59	Bahamas	Indianapolis
16:00	Scoring by quarter: 24–14, 29–15, 24–14, 22–16
	Pts: Jefferson 17; Rebs: Jefferson 11; Asts: Trice 6	Boxscore	Pts: Mackey 13; Rebs: Mackey 6 Asts: Rolle III 5	Arena: Indiana Convention Center; Referees: Matthew Kallio (CAN), José Fernández (CRC), Carlos Vélez (COL)

29 November 2020	Puerto Rico	56–81	Mexico	Indianapolis, United States
19:30	Scoring by quarter: 8–22, 24–13, 15–19, 9–27
	Pts: Gandía 23; Rebs: Ándujar 4 Asts: three players 3	Boxscore	Pts: Martínez 18; Rebs: Gutiérrez 13; Asts: Stoll 8	Arena: Indiana Convention Center; Referees: Leandro Lezcano (ARG), Julio Anaya (PAN), Roberto Mota (DOM)

30 November 2020	Puerto Rico	91–85	Bahamas	Indianapolis, United States
16:00	Scoring by quarter: 17–17, 24–30, 26–24, 24–14
	Pts: Paige 19; Rebs: Clavell 6 Asts: Gandía, Paige 5	Boxscore	Pts: Taylor 25; Rebs: Smith 12; Asts: Cornish 5	Arena: Indiana Convention Center; Referees: Matthew Kallio (CAN), Andrés Bartel (URU), Carlos Vélez (COL)

30 November 2020	United States	94–78	Mexico	Indianapolis
19:30	Scoring by quarter: 23–20, 29–14, 20–19, 22–25
	Pts: Maten 21; Rebs: Maten 9 Asts: Trice 6	Boxscore	Pts: Martínez 17; Rebs: Gutiérrez 9 Asts: Stoll 9	Arena: Indiana Convention Center; Referees: Leandro Lezcano (ARG), Julio Anaya (PAN), José Fernández (CRC)

19 February 2021	Bahamas	77–93	United States	San Juan, Puerto Rico
17:30	Scoring by quarter: 19–25, 21–29, 21–21, 16–18
	Pts: Munnings 22; Rebs: Nesbitt 9 Asts: Munnings 5	Boxscore	Pts: Nunnally, Thomas 19; Rebs: Bass 10; Asts: Johnson 6	Arena: Roberto Clemente Coliseum; Referees: Michael Weiland (CAN), Julio Anaya (PAN), José Fernández (CRC)

19 February 2021	Mexico	70–80	Puerto Rico	San Juan, Puerto Rico
21:00	Scoring by quarter: 13–22, 21–18, 19–18, 17–22
	Pts: Girón 17; Rebs: Ayón 8 Asts: Girón 4	Boxscore	Pts: Gia. Clavell 23; Rebs: Clemente 11; Asts: Napier 5	Arena: Roberto Clemente Coliseum; Referees: Fabricio Vito (ARG), Carlos Peralta (ECU), Carlos Vélez (COL)

20 February 2021	Mexico	75–96	United States	San Juan, Puerto Rico
18:00	Scoring by quarter: 15–31, 18–27, 20–19, 22–19
	Pts: Garibay 19; Rebs: Garibay 9 Asts: Estrada 4	Boxscore	Pts: James 21; Rebs: Johnson 9 Asts: Johnson 7	Arena: Roberto Clemente Coliseum; Referees: Michael Weiland (CAN), Julio Anaya (PAN), Carlos Vélez (COL)

20 February 2021	Bahamas	97–102	Puerto Rico	San Juan, Puerto Rico
21:00	Scoring by quarter: 20–22, 28–30, 31–18, 18–32
	Pts: Thompson 21; Rebs: Munnings 7 Asts: Munnings 9	Boxscore	Pts: Barea, Gia. Clavell 26; Rebs: Barea 7 Asts: Barea 8	Arena: Roberto Clemente Coliseum; Referees: Fabricio Vito (ARG), Juan Fernández (ARG), Felipe Valenzuela (CHI)

== Qualified teams ==
Team	Qualification method	Date of qualification	App	Last	Best placement in tournament
Brazil	Group B top three	28 November 2020	19th	2017	Champions (1984, 1988, 2005, 2009)
Panama	Group B top three	28 November 2020	13th	2017	Fourth place (1984)
United States	Group D top three	30 November 2020	11th	2017	Champions (1992, 1993, 1997, 1999, 2003, 2007, 2017)
Dominican Republic	Group C top three	19 February 2021	14th	2017	Third place (2011)
Mexico	Group D top three	19 February 2021	15th	2017	Champions (2013)
Canada	Group C top three	20 February 2021	19th	2017	Runners-up (1980, 1999)
Puerto Rico	Group D top three	20 February 2021	19th	2017	Champions (1980, 1989, 1995)
Uruguay	Group B top three	21 February 2021	18th	2017	Runners-up (1984)
Venezuela	Group A top three	21 February 2021	17th	2017	Champions (2015)
Argentina	Group A top three	21 February 2021	19th	2017	Champions (2001, 2011)
Colombia	Group A top three	22 February 2021	2nd	2017	Eleventh place (2017)
Virgin Islands	Group C top three	4 March 2021	6th	2017	Fourth place (2017)
