= List of men's national basketball teams =

This is a list of the men's national basketball teams in the world. There are more than 200 national basketball teams, the second sport with more national teams, with teams representing all UN member states except Liechtenstein, as well as several dependent territories, sub-national entities and states who are not members of the United Nations.

This list excludes other teams, which generally play outside FIBA's recognition. Excluded teams include those who represent ethnic groups, sub-national entities and dependent territories other than those recognized by FIBA or its confederations, competitors at the Island Games, unrecognized states, separatist movements, and pseudo or micronations.

== Members of FIBA affiliated confederations ==
Map of the World with the five confederations: Africa Americas Asia Europe Oceania

This section lists the 213 men's national basketball teams affiliated to FIBA, through their national basketball associations. FIBA members are eligible to enter the FIBA Basketball World Cup and matches between them are recognized as official international matches.

The five confederations are:

- Africa – FIBA Africa
- Americas – FIBA Americas
- Asia – FIBA Asia
- Europe – FIBA Europe
- Oceania – FIBA Oceania

FIBA runs the World Cup as a tournament for national teams to find the world champion. Each confederation also runs its own championship to find the best team from among its members:

- Africa – AfroBasket
- Americas – FIBA AmeriCup
- Asia – FIBA Asia Cup
- Oceania – FIBA Oceania Championship
- Europe – EuroBasket

Members of FIBA include a majority of United Nations member states, as well as one state that is an observer at the United Nations (Palestine). They also include several constituent countries, autonomous areas, associated states, dependent territories, and two sovereign states who are neither UN members or observers (Kosovo and the Republic of China). The team from the Republic of China is designated as "Chinese Taipei" by both FIBA and its affiliated continental confederations.

=== FIBA Africa ===
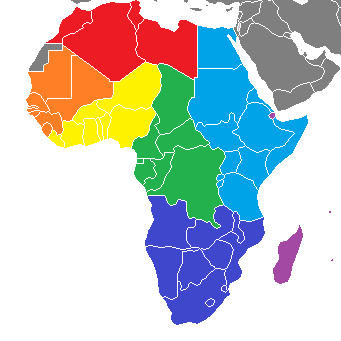
FIBA Africa subzones.

FIBA Africa, which has 54 national teams, is divided into 7 zones.

==== Zone 1 ====
- Algeria (1963)
- Libya (1961)
- Morocco (1936)
- Tunisia (1956)

==== Zone 2 ====
- Cape Verde (1988)
- Gambia (1972)
- Guinea (1962)
- Guinea-Bissau (1994)
- Mali (1961)
- Mauritania (1964)
- Senegal (1962)
- Sierra Leone (1991)

==== Zone 3 ====
- Benin (1962)
- Burkina Faso (1964)
- Ivory Coast (1962)
- Ghana (1962)
- Liberia (1964)
- Niger (1963)
- Nigeria (1964)
- Togo (1963)

==== Zone 4 ====
- Cameroon (1965)
- Central African Republic (1963)
- Chad (1963)
- Congo (1962)
- DR Congo (1963)
- Equatorial Guinea (1994)
- Gabon (1965)
- São Tomé and Príncipe (1983)

==== Zone 5 ====
- Burundi (1994)
- Egypt (1934)
- Eritrea (1997)
- Ethiopia (1949)
- Kenya (1965)
- Rwanda (1977)
- Somalia (1960)
- South Sudan (2013)
- Sudan (1953)
- Tanzania (1963)
- Uganda (1963)

==== Zone 6 ====
- Angola (1979)
- Botswana (1997)
- Eswatini (2000)
- Lesotho (1997)
- Malawi (1988)
- Mozambique (1978)
- Namibia (1995)
- South Africa (1992)
- Zambia (1962)
- Zimbabwe (1962)

==== Zone 7 ====
- Comoros (1995)
- Djibouti (1979)
- Madagascar (1963)
- Mauritius (1959)
- Seychelles (1979)

=== FIBA Americas ===
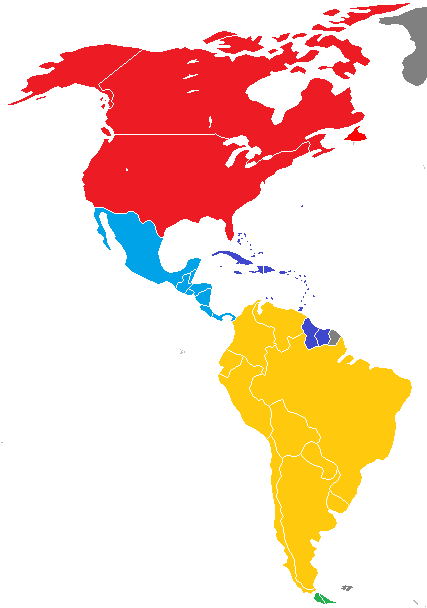
FIBA Americas subzones.

FIBA Americas (formerly the Pan-American Basketball Confederation), which controls North America, Central America, the Caribbean, and South America, has 43 national teams, divided into three areas. The Central American and Caribbean Confederations of Basketball (CONCECABA) is further divided into the Central America and Caribbean zone.

==== Caribbean ====
- Antigua and Barbuda
- Aruba
- Bahamas
- Barbados
- Bermuda
- British Virgin Islands
- Cayman Islands
- Cuba
- Dominica
- Dominican Republic
- Grenada
- Guyana
- Haiti
- Jamaica
- Montserrat
- Puerto Rico
- Saint Kitts and Nevis
- Saint Lucia
- Saint Vincent and the Grenadines
- Suriname
- Trinidad and Tobago
- Turks and Caicos Islands
- Virgin Islands

==== Central America ====
- Belize
- Costa Rica
- El Salvador
- Guatemala
- Honduras
- Mexico
- Nicaragua
- Panama

==== North America ====
- Canada
- United States

==== South America ====
- Argentina
- Bolivia
- Brazil
- Chile
- Colombia
- Ecuador
- Paraguay
- Peru
- Uruguay
- Venezuela

=== FIBA Asia ===
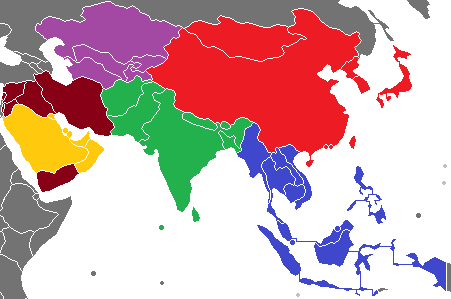
FIBA Asia subzones.

FIBA Asia (formerly the Asian Basketball onfederation) is divided into 6 zones and has 44 national teams.

==== Central Asia ====
- Kazakhstan
- Kyrgyzstan
- Tajikistan
- Turkmenistan
- Uzbekistan

==== East Asia ====
- China
- Chinese Taipei
- Hong Kong
- Japan
- Macau
- Mongolia
- North Korea
- South Korea

==== Gulf ====
- Bahrain
- Kuwait
- Oman
- Qatar
- Saudi Arabia
- United Arab Emirates

==== South Asia ====
- Afghanistan
- Bangladesh
- Bhutan
- India
- Maldives
- Nepal
- Pakistan
- Sri Lanka

==== Southeast Asia ====
- Brunei
- Cambodia
- Indonesia
- Laos
- Malaysia
- Myanmar
- Philippines
- Singapore
- Thailand
- Vietnam

==== West Asia ====
- Iran
- Iraq
- Jordan
- Lebanon
- Palestine
- Syria
- Yemen

=== FIBA Europe ===
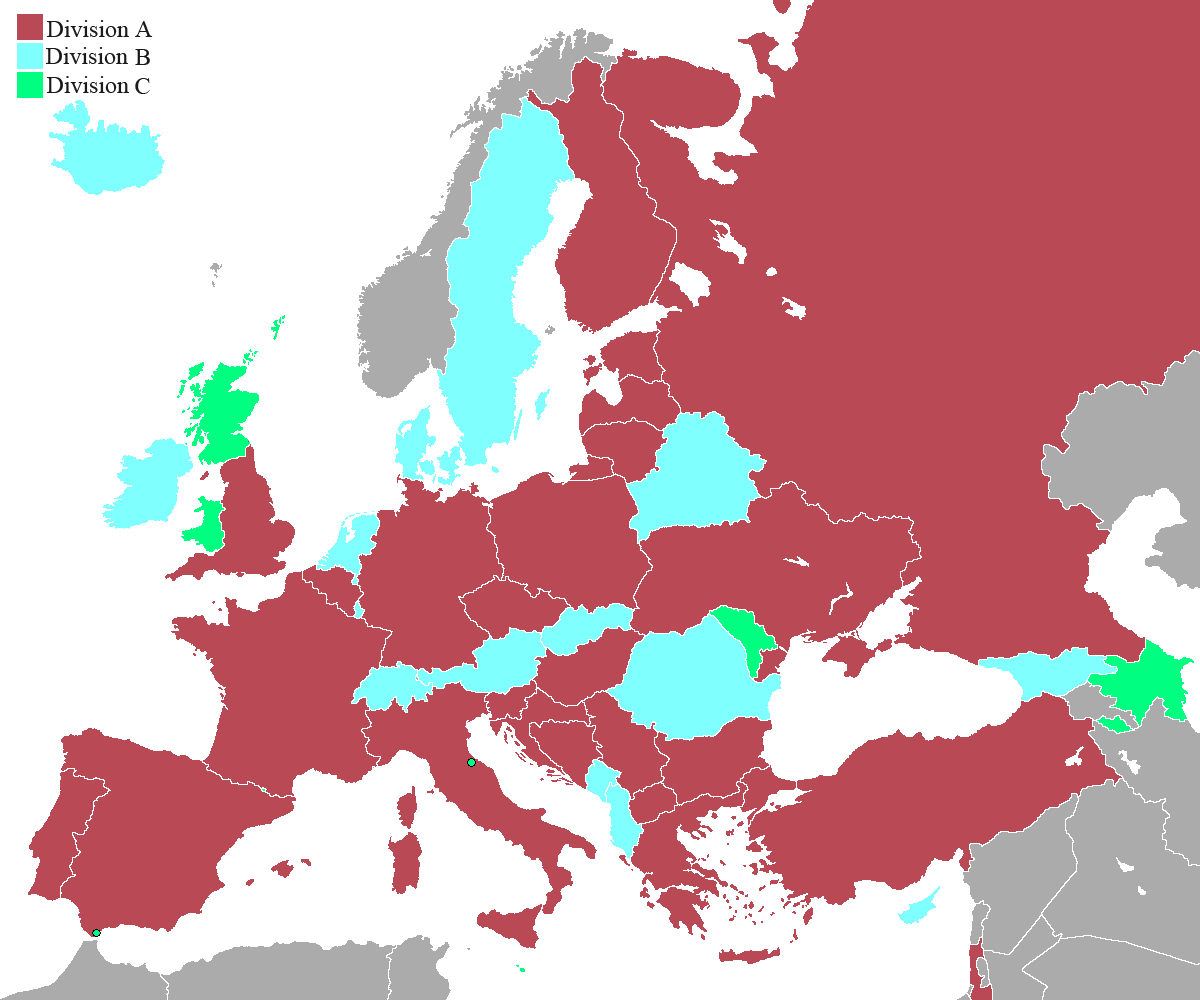
FIBA Europe subzones.

FIBA Europe has 50 member nations under it.

- Albania
- Andorra
- Armenia
- Austria
- Azerbaijan
- Belarus
- Belgium
- Bosnia and Herzegovina
- Bulgaria
- Croatia
- Cyprus
- Czech Republic
- Denmark
- Estonia
- Finland
- France
- Georgia
- Germany
- Gibraltar
- Great Britain
- Greece
- Hungary
- Iceland
- Ireland
- Israel
- Italy
- Kosovo
- Latvia
- Lithuania
- Luxembourg
- Malta
- Moldova
- Monaco
- Montenegro
- Netherlands
- North Macedonia
- Norway
- Poland
- Portugal
- Romania
- Russia
- San Marino
- Serbia
- Slovakia
- Slovenia
- Spain
- Sweden
- Switzerland
- Turkey
- Ukraine

Great Britain, a combined team of England, Scotland and Wales, competed in Eurobasket 2009 and played at the 2012 Olympics. Starting September 30, 2016, England, Scotland and Wales rescinded their FIBA memberships and operate internationally as the British Basketball Federation.

=== FIBA Oceania ===
FIBA Oceania has 22 member nations under it.

- American Samoa
- Australia
- Cook Islands
- Federated States of Micronesia
- Fiji
- Guam
- Kiribati
- Marshall Islands
- Nauru
- New Caledonia
- New Zealand
- Norfolk Island
- Northern Mariana Islands
- Palau
- Papua New Guinea
- Samoa
- Solomon Islands
- Tahiti
- Timor-Leste
- Tonga
- Tuvalu
- Vanuatu

== Countries not affiliated with FIBA ==
- Liechtenstein
- Niue
- Vatican City

== Former teams ==
- Czechoslovakia – split into two teams; no team carried over the records of Czechoslovakia
  - Czech Republic
  - Slovakia
- East Germany – merged into
  - West Germany; West Germany assumes the records of a unified Germany team
- South Vietnam – merged into
  - North Vietnam; North Vietnam assumes the records of a unified Vietnam team
- South Yemen – merged into
  - North Yemen; North Yemen assumes the records of a unified Yemen team
- Soviet Union – split into 15 different national teams; no team carried over the records of the Soviet Union. National teams descended from Soviet Union are:

- Armenia
- Azerbaijan
- Belarus

- Georgia
- Kazakhstan
- Kyrgyzstan

- Moldova
- Tajikistan
- Turkmenistan

- Ukraine
- Uzbekistan

The three Baltic states and Russia which played international basketball prior to 1945 inherited their old records prior to being merged with Soviet Union:
- Estonia
- Latvia
- Lithuania
- Russia
The Unified Team (a.k.a. the Commonwealth of Independent States (CIS) team) for the 1992 Summer Olympics was a one-off team.

- United Arab Republic – merger of two teams;
  - Egypt
  - Syria

Later split into two teams:
- Syria retained its old records as Syria.
- United Arab Republic (later renamed as Egypt) retained the old records as Egypt

- Yugoslavia – split into five teams; no team carried over the records of Yugoslavia. Other national teams descended from Yugoslavia are:
  - Bosnia and Herzegovina
  - Croatia
  - North Macedonia
  - Slovenia
  - Serbia and Montenegro – split into two teams
    - Montenegro
    - Serbia; retained Serbia and Montenegro's records. A team later split from Serbia:
      - Kosovo
- Netherlands Antilles – replaced by:
  - Aruba

== FIBA country codes ==
FIBA uses IOC country codes for most countries which are IOC members. For non-IOC members and exceptions, FIBA uses the following codes:

- England: ENG
- Gibraltar: GIB
- Marshall Islands: MIS (IOC: MHL)
- Montserrat: MAT
- New Caledonia: CAL
- Norfolk Island: NIS
- Northern Mariana Islands: SAI
- Scotland: SCO
- Tahiti: TAH
- Turks and Caicos Islands: TCI
- Wales: WAL

== See also ==
- List of women's national basketball teams
