= 2029 FIBA AmeriCup qualification =

International qualification tournament

- Dates: 20 March 2026 – February 2029

Official website
- Pre-qualifiers website Central American pre-qualifiers website Caribbean pre-qualifiers website

The 2029 FIBA AmeriCup qualification is a basketball competition that is currently being played from March 2026 to February 2029, to determine the FIBA Americas nations who will qualify for the 2029 FIBA AmeriCup.

== Sub-zone pre-qualifiers ==
=== Central America ===
The tournament was held in San Salvador, El Salvador.

All times are local (UTC−6).

Pos	Team	Pld	W	L	PF	PA	PD	Pts	Qualification
1	Costa Rica	3	3	0	262	193	+69	6	Pre-qualifiers
2	El Salvador (H)	3	2	1	239	200	+39	5	
3	Honduras	3	1	2	200	227	−27	4	
4	Guatemala	3	0	3	188	269	−81	3	

Source: FIBA
Rules for classification: 1) points; 2) head-to-head points; 3) head-to-head points difference; 4) head-to-head number of points scored.
(H) Hosts

20 March 2026	Costa Rica	79–66	Honduras	San Salvador, El Salvador
16:30	Scoring by quarter: 19–19, 29–14, 12–24, 19–9
	Pts: Martínez, Dav. Shedden 12; Rebs: Martínez 9 Asts: Conejo 6	Boxscore	Pts: Bodden 18; Rebs: three players 10; Asts: Alfaro, Brooks 3	Arena: Gimnasio Nacional José Adolfo Pineda; Referees: Carmelo de la Rosa (PUR), Mario Granados (ESA), Juan Cantillo (COL)

20 March 2026	El Salvador	92–60	Guatemala	San Salvador
19:00	Scoring by quarter: 19–19, 25–13, 24–15, 24–13
	Pts: Menjivar 19; Rebs: Montavious 12; Asts: Menjivar 6	Boxscore	Pts: Avila Jr. 22; Rebs: Rodriguez 11; Asts: Fernández, Rodriguez 2	Arena: Gimnasio Nacional José Adolfo Pineda; Referees: Fernando Leite (BRA), Luis Escobedo (MEX), Winker Mateo (DOM)

21 March 2026	Guatemala	50–98	Costa Rica	San Salvador, El Salvador
16ː00	Scoring by quarter: 23–23, 9–24, 14–26, 4–25
	Pts: Avila Jr. 22; Rebs: Lima 8 Asts: Avila Jr. 3	Boxscore	Pts: Arias, McDonald 15; Rebs: Martínez 8 Asts: Conejo 6	Arena: Gimnasio Nacional José Adolfo Pineda; Referees: Mario Granados (ESA), Fernando Leite (BRA), Luis Escobedo (MEX)

21 March 2026	Honduras	55–70	El Salvador	San Salvador, El Salvador
18:30	Scoring by quarter: 7–23, 14–19, 21–16, 13–12
	Pts: Rapalo 18; Rebs: Martinez 9 Asts: Brooks 4	Boxscore	Pts: Garcia 29; Rebs: Garcia 13; Asts: Rodriguez 9	Arena: Gimnasio Nacional José Adolfo Pineda; Referees: Carlos Pallares (COL), Winker Mateo (DOM), Carmelo de la Rosa (PUR)

22 March 2026	Honduras	79–78	Guatemala	San Salvador, El Salvador
15:30	Scoring by quarter: 25–10, 25–14, 15–25, 14–29
	Pts: Guerrero 23; Rebs: Bodden 15; Asts: Guerrero 4	Boxscore	Pts: Avila Jr. 33; Rebs: Avila Jr. 7 Asts: Hernández, Rodriguez 7	Arena: Gimnasio Nacional José Adolfo Pineda; Referees: Carmelo de la Rosa (PUR), Luis Escobedo (MEX), Juan Cantillo (COL)

22 March 2026	El Salvador	77–85	Costa Rica	San Salvador
18:00	Scoring by quarter: 15–22, 24–26, 21–21, 17–16
	Pts: Mosley 33; Rebs: Garcia 11; Asts: Rodriguez 4	Boxscore	Pts: Dan. Shedden 20; Rebs: three players 7 Asts: three players 4	Arena: Gimnasio Nacional José Adolfo Pineda; Referees: Johnny Batista (PUR), Fernando Leite (BRA), Carlos Pallares (COL)

=== Caribbean Pre-qualifiers ===
The tournament was held in Georgetown, Guyana.

All times are local (UTC−4).

==== Group A ====
Pos	Team	Pld	W	L	PF	PA	PD	Pts	Qualification
1	Antigua and Barbuda	4	3	1	331	233	+98	7 (Note: Head-to-head: Antigua and Barbuda 2 Pts, +27 PD; Guyana 2 Pts, −11 PD; Turks and Caicos 2 Pts, −16 PD.)	Qualified, later withdrew
2	Guyana (H)	4	3	1	257	250	+7	7	Pre-qualifiers
3	Turks and Caicos Islands	4	3	1	282	266	+16	7	
4	Dominica	4	1	3	240	304	−64	5	
5	Bermuda	4	0	4	232	289	−57	4	

Source: FIBA
Rules for classification: 1) points; 2) head-to-head points; 3) head-to-head points difference; 4) head-to-head number of points scored.
(H) Hosts
Notes:

8 July 2026	Bermuda	50–82	Antigua and Barbuda	Georgetown, Guyana
17ː30	Scoring by quarter: 20–14, 12–25, 5–20, 13–23
	Pts: Scott 14; Rebs: Williams 9 Asts: Peters 2	Boxscore	Pts: three players 14; Rebs: Jackson 10; Asts: Spencer 5	Arena: Cliff Anderson Sports Hall; Referees: Carmelo de la Rosa (PUR), Ryan Langdon (CAN), Mario Granados (ESA)

8 July 2026	Turks and Caicos Islands	68–55	Guyana	Georgetown, Guyana
20ː00	Scoring by quarter: 10–12, 21–11, 24–19, 13–13
	Pts: Taylor 16; Rebs: Morris 9 Asts: Morris 3	Boxscore	Pts: Mickle 24; Rebs: Rashid 12; Asts: five players 2	Arena: Cliff Anderson Sports Hall; Referees: Roberto Fernández (CRC), Samuel Hidalgo (DOM), Luis Fernández (PUR)

9 July 2026	Turks and Caicos Islands	81–64	Dominica	Georgetown, Guyana
17ː30	Scoring by quarter: 21–16, 21–16, 15–19, 24–13
	Pts: Taylor 17; Rebs: Maximin 9 Asts: Morris 5	Boxscore	Pts: Boland 22; Rebs: Boland 14; Asts: Barry, Thomas 5	Arena: Cliff Anderson Sports Hall; Referees: Roberto Fernández (CRC), Gregory Hamilton (CAY), Juan Cantillo (COL)

9 July 2026	Guyana	75–73(OT)	Antigua and Barbuda	Georgetown
20ː00	Scoring by quarter: 11–15, 18–16, 21–17, 19–21, Overtime: 6–4
	Pts: Wiggins 24; Rebs: Rashid, Rose 8 Asts: Rose 4	Boxscore	Pts: Merrick, Spencer 16; Rebs: Charles 10; Asts: Andrew 5	Arena: Cliff Anderson Sports Hall; Referees: Carlos Vélez (COL), Edwin Quiles (PUR), Mario Granados (ESA)

10 July 2026	Bermuda	61–76	Turks and Caicos Islands	Georgetown, Guyana
17ː30	Scoring by quarter: 10–20, 17–13, 12–23, 22–20
	Pts: Scott, Williams 13; Rebs: Williams 9 Asts: Basden 3	Boxscore	Pts: three players 12; Rebs: Maximin 18; Asts: Lacossade 5	Arena: Cliff Anderson Sports Hall; Referees: Ryan Langdon (CAN), Gustavo Mathias (BRA), Nelson Villeda (HON)

10 July 2026	Dominica	53–68	Guyana	Georgetown, Guyana
20ː00	Scoring by quarter: 16–13, 8–13, 19–21, 10–21
	Pts: Boland 13; Rebs: Carbon 9 Asts: Barry 4	Boxscore	Pts: Rose 20; Rebs: Mickle 11; Asts: Rose 5	Arena: Cliff Anderson Sports Hall; Referees: Edwin Quiles (PUR), Juan Cantillo (COL), Gregory Hamilton (CAY)

11 July 2026	Antigua and Barbuda	90–51	Dominica	Georgetown, Guyana
17ː30	Scoring by quarter: 23–20, 26–10, 24–17, 17–4
	Pts: Merrick 26; Rebs: Andrew 16; Asts: Andrew 6	Boxscore	Pts: Daniel 10; Rebs: Boland 10; Asts: Barry, Regis 2	Arena: Cliff Anderson Sports Hall; Referees: Gustavo Mathias (BRA), Carmelo de la Rosa (PUR), Gregory Hamilton (CAY)

11 July 2026	Guyana	59–56	Bermuda	Georgetown
20ː00	Scoring by quarter: 11–12, 21–16, 13–16, 14–12
	Pts: Rashid 20; Rebs: Smith 9 Asts: Rose 8	Boxscore	Pts: Scott 16; Rebs: Scott 12; Asts: Williams 3	Arena: Cliff Anderson Sports Hall; Referees: Carlos Vélez (COL), Juan Cantillo (COL), Iván Huck (ARG)

12 July 2026	Dominica	72–65	Bermuda	Georgetown, Guyana
17ː30	Scoring by quarter: 14–14, 19–20, 19–10, 20–21
	Pts: Daniel 13; Rebs: Daniel 11; Asts: Boland 6	Boxscore	Pts: McDonald 23; Rebs: Davis, Scott 10; Asts: Peters 5	Arena: Cliff Anderson Sports Hall; Referees: Carlos Vélez (COL), Gregory Hamilton (CAY), Mario Granados (ESA)

12 July 2026	Antigua and Barbuda	86–57	Turks and Caicos Islands	Georgetown, Guyana
20ː00	Scoring by quarter: 27–13, 12–11, 23–9, 24–24
	Pts: Spencer 27; Rebs: Charles 12; Asts: Joseph 5	Boxscore	Pts: Taylor 25; Rebs: Maximin 17; Asts: Taylor 2	Arena: Cliff Anderson Sports Hall; Referees: Edwin Quiles (PUR), Juan Cantillo (COL), Ryan Langdon (CAN)

==== Group B ====
Pos	Team	Pld	W	L	PF	PA	PD	Pts	Qualification
1	Barbados	4	4	0	375	283	+92	8	Pre-qualifiers
2	Haiti	4	3	1	361	275	+86	7	
3	Saint Vincent and the Grenadines	4	2	2	331	325	+6	6	
4	Cayman Islands	4	1	3	242	357	−115	5	
5	Grenada	4	0	4	281	350	−69	4	

Source: FIBA
Rules for classification: 1) points; 2) head-to-head points; 3) head-to-head points difference; 4) head-to-head number of points scored.

8 July 2026	Barbados	89–54	Cayman Islands	Georgetown, Guyana
12ː30	Scoring by quarter: 19–10, 29–9, 24–16, 17–19
	Pts: Alexander 15; Rebs: Marsh 10; Asts: Marsh, Maynard 3	Boxscore	Pts: lansdell 19; Rebs: O'Garro 6 Asts: Collins, O'Garro 3	Arena: Cliff Anderson Sports Hall; Attendance: 50; Referees: Edwin Quiles (PUR), Juan Cantillo (COL), Iván Huck (ARG)

8 July 2026	Grenada	66–85	Saint Vincent and the Grenadines	Georgetown, Guyana
15ː00	Scoring by quarter: 16–16, 7–16, 24–20, 19–33
	Pts: Cox 17; Rebs: Redhead 9 Asts: Cox 5	Boxscore	Pts: Thomas 20; Rebs: Glasgow 11; Asts: Glasgow, Thomas 5	Arena: Cliff Anderson Sports Hall; Referees: Carlos Vélez (COL), Gustavo Mathias (BRA), Jonathan Macias (ECU)

9 July 2026	Cayman Islands	77–68	Grenada	Georgetown, Guyana
12ː30	Scoring by quarter: 16–8, 15–22, 27–18, 19–20
	Pts: Cotterell 21; Rebs: Miller 8 Asts: O'Garro 5	Boxscore	Pts: Cox 18; Rebs: Regis 12; Asts: Redhead 7	Arena: Cliff Anderson Sports Hall; Referees: Ryan Langdon (CAN), Carmelo de la Rosa (PUR), Nelson Villeda (HON)

9 July 2026	Haiti	68–91	Barbados	Georgetown, Guyana
15ː00	Scoring by quarter: 29–21, 16–26, 16–20, 7–24
	Pts: Lalanne 18; Rebs: Dort 14; Asts: Segu 6	Boxscore	Pts: Alexander 36; Rebs: Thorpe 12; Asts: Alexander, Hurley 4	Arena: Cliff Anderson Sports Hall; Referees: Gustavo Mathias (BRA), Samuel Hidalgo (DOM), Luis Fernández (PUR)

10 July 2026	Grenada	70–89	Haiti	Georgetown, Guyana
12ː30	Scoring by quarter: 9–21, 12–26, 32–23, 17–19
	Pts: Regis 25; Rebs: Checkley, Regis 9 Asts: Cox 2	Boxscore	Pts: Dort 22; Rebs: Dort 10; Asts: Lalanne 7	Arena: Cliff Anderson Sports Hall; Referees: Carlos Vélez (COL), Mario Granados (ESA), Jonathan Macias (ECU)

10 July 2026	Saint Vincent and the Grenadines	96–63	Cayman Islands	Georgetown, Guyana
15ː00	Scoring by quarter: 25–17, 16–20, 32–13, 23–13
	Pts: Lawrence-Ricks 19; Rebs: Glasgow 10; Asts: Glasgow 6	Boxscore	Pts: lansdell 19; Rebs: lansdell 10; Asts: O'Garro 3	Arena: Cliff Anderson Sports Hall; Referees: Carmelo de la Rosa (PUR), Luis Fernández (PUR), Iván Huck (ARG)

11 July 2026	Barbados	99–77	Grenada	Georgetown, Guyana
12ː30	Scoring by quarter: 17–26, 36–17, 29–15, 17–19
	Pts: Alexander 32; Rebs: Benn 8 Asts: Hurley 6	Boxscore	Pts: Regis 26; Rebs: Regis 12; Asts: Williams 4	Arena: Cliff Anderson Sports Hall; Referees: Roberto Fernández (CRC), Luis Fernández (PUR), Nelson Villeda (HON)

11 July 2026	Haiti	100–66	Saint Vincent and the Grenadines	Georgetown, Guyana
15ː00	Scoring by quarter: 25–17, 29–22, 23–18, 23–9
	Pts: Segu 24; Rebs: Dort 22; Asts: Dort, Segu 5	Boxscore	Pts: Thomas 17; Rebs: Thomas 10; Asts: Bramble, Glasgow 2	Arena: Cliff Anderson Sports Hall; Referees: Edwin Quiles (PUR), Samuel Hidalgo (DOM), Jonathan Macias (ECU)

12 July 2026	Saint Vincent and the Grenadines	84–96	Barbados	Georgetown, Guyana
12ː30	Scoring by quarter: 23–24, 22–20, 22–27, 17–25
	Pts: Thomas 16; Rebs: Thomas 8 Asts: Glasgow 6	Boxscore	Pts: Alexander 32; Rebs: Alexander 11; Asts: Hurley 8	Arena: Cliff Anderson Sports Hall; Referees: Carmelo de la Rosa (PUR), Gustavo Mathias (BRA), Samuel Hidalgo (DOM)

12 July 2026	Cayman Islands	48–104	Haiti	Georgetown, Guyana
15ː00	Scoring by quarter: 8–26, 6–28, 17–23, 17–27
	Pts: lansdell 16; Rebs: Collins 8 Asts: O'Garro 2	Boxscore	Pts: Simeus 23; Rebs: Simeus 10; Asts: Ulysse 9	Arena: Cliff Anderson Sports Hall; Referees: Roberto Fernández (CRC), Luis Fernández (PUR), Iván Huck (ARG)

== Pre-qualifiers ==
The eight participating teams will be divided into two groups: Each team will play against the rest of the teams in its group (total of three games per team). The best two teams in each of the groups will automatically qualify for the Qualifiers.

The teams and groups were announced on 14 October 2026. Antigua and Barbuda withdrew from the competition and were replaced by Guyana, as the next eligible Caribbean team according to the FIBA Men's World Ranking. The South American sub-zone pre-qualifier was not held, and Ecuador was designated as the South American representative.

Entrance/qualification method	Team(s)
Eliminated from the 2027 FIBA Basketball World Cup qualification first round	Cuba; Jamaica; Nicaragua; Venezuela
Qualified from the sub-zone pre-qualifiers	~~Antigua and Barbuda~~; Barbados; Costa Rica; Ecuador; Guyana

=== Group A ===
Group A will be held in Managua, Nicaragua.

All times are local (UTC−6).

Pos	Team	Pld	W	L	PF	PA	PD	Pts	Qualification
1	Jamaica	0	0	0	0	0	0	0	Qualifiers
1	Nicaragua (H)	0	0	0	0	0	0	0	Qualifiers
1	Guyana	0	0	0	0	0	0	0	
1	Costa Rica	0	0	0	0	0	0	0	

First game(s) will be played: 27 November 2026. Source: FIBA
Rules for classification: 1) points; 2) head-to-head points; 3) head-to-head points difference; 4) head-to-head number of points scored.
(H) Hosts

27 November 2026	Jamaica	vs.	Costa Rica	Managua, Nicaragua
16:30
		Boxscore		Arena: Polideportivo Alexis Argüello

27 November 2026	Nicaragua	vs.	Guyana	Managua
19:00
		Boxscore		Arena: Polideportivo Alexis Argüello

28 November 2026	Guyana	vs.	Jamaica	Managua, Nicaragua
16:30
		Boxscore		Arena: Polideportivo Alexis Argüello

28 November 2026	Costa Rica	vs.	Nicaragua	Managua, Nicaragua
19:00
		Boxscore		Arena: Polideportivo Alexis Argüello

29 November 2026	Costa Rica	vs.	Guyana	Managua, Nicaragua
16:30
		Boxscore		Arena: Polideportivo Alexis Argüello

29 November 2026	Nicaragua	vs.	Jamaica	Managua
19:00
		Boxscore		Arena: Polideportivo Alexis Argüello

=== Group B ===
Group B will be held in La Asunción, Venezuela.

All times are local (UTC−4).

Pos	Team	Pld	W	L	PF	PA	PD	Pts	Qualification
1	Cuba	0	0	0	0	0	0	0	Qualifiers
1	Venezuela (H)	0	0	0	0	0	0	0	Qualifiers
1	Ecuador	0	0	0	0	0	0	0	
1	Barbados	0	0	0	0	0	0	0	

First game(s) will be played: 26 November 2026. Source: FIBA
Rules for classification: 1) points; 2) head-to-head points; 3) head-to-head points difference; 4) head-to-head number of points scored.
(H) Hosts

26 November 2026	Cuba	vs.	Barbados	La Asunción, Venezuela
17:00
		Boxscore		Arena: Gimnasio Ciudad de la Asunción

26 November 2026	Venezuela	vs.	Ecuador	La Asunción
19:30
		Boxscore		Arena: Gimnasio Ciudad de la Asunción

27 November 2026	Ecuador	vs.	Cuba	La Asunción, Venezuela
17:00
		Boxscore		Arena: Gimnasio Ciudad de la Asunción

27 November 2026	Barbados	vs.	Venezuela	La Asunción, Venezuela
19:30
		Boxscore		Arena: Gimnasio Ciudad de la Asunción

28 November 2026	Barbados	vs.	Ecuador	La Asunción, Venezuela
17:00
		Boxscore		Arena: Gimnasio Ciudad de la Asunción

28 November 2026	Venezuela	vs.	Cuba	La Asunción
19:30
		Boxscore		Arena: Gimnasio Ciudad de la Asunción

== Qualifiers ==
12 teams from the 2027 FIBA Basketball World Cup qualification were directly qualified and will be joined by the four teams qualifying from the pre-qualifiers. They will be drawn into four groups of four teams and played a home-and-away format. The top three teams of Groups A, B, C and D, will qualify for the final tournament. They will also earn their spot for the qualifiers of the 2031 FIBA World Cup in France.

Entrance/qualification method	Team(s)
Qualified from 2027 FIBA Basketball World Cup qualification second round	Argentina; Bahamas; Brazil; Canada; Chile; Colombia; Dominican Republic; Mexico; Panama; Puerto Rico; United States; Uruguay
Qualified from the pre-qualifiers	TBD; TBD; TBD; TBD
