= BasketNews =

Website on basketball of Lithuanian origin

- Available in: Lithuanian, English, Serbian
- Country of origin: Lithuania
- Creator: Jonas Miklovas
- CEO: Jonas Miklovas
- Industry: Basketball news website
- Parent: UAB SPORT IN COLORS (parent of BasketNews.lt), UAB BasketNews (parent of BasketNews.com)
- Website: www.basketnews.lt (Lithuanian version), www.basketnews.com (English version), www.basketnews.rs (Serbian version)
- Commercial: Yes
- Registration: Available with a paid BN+ subscription for extended content, but not required
- Launched: 10 March 2005
- Current status: Active

BasketNews is a basketball-centered website of Lithuanian origin that provides in Lithuanian, English, and Serbian languages coverage of professional and semi-professional club basketball leagues, primarily focusing its content on the National Basketball Association, EuroLeague, EuroCup, FIBA Europe Cup, Lithuanian Basketball League and the largest European national leagues, national teams competitions organized by FIBA, and Olympic Games.

== History ==
The Lithuanian language version website BasketNews.lt was launched on 10 March 2005. The official channel BasketNewsLT in YouTube.com was created on 4 January 2009 and has over 76,000 subscribers, over 7,000 videos which were watched over 77 million times. The English language channel BasketNews_COM was created on 10 September 2013 and has over 194,000 subscribers, 1,751 videos which were watched over 83 million times. The international English language website version BasketNews.com was launched on 27 June 2021. The most popular videos created and published by BasketNews.com were watched for over 1.5 million times in YouTube.com.

The BasketNews.lt daily attracts a large number of basketball fans from Lithuania who generate tens of thousands of openings of its articles. In 2024, the most read BasketNews.lt article was opened 110,627 times, while the most viewed video created by BasketNews.lt featured a Lithuanian language interview of two-hours length with Jonas Valančiūnas and was watched over 150,000 times. In 2025, the most read BasketNews.lt article was opened 103,917 times, while the most viewed video created and shared jointly by BasketNewsLT and English version BasketNews_COM channels in YouTube.com about Ignas Sargiūnas scoring nine points in 9.8 seconds versus the Great Britain men's national basketball team was watched over 272,000 times.

In 2025, the BasketNews together with other Lithuanian mass media outlets contributed to the fact that according to a survey only 25% of people in Lithuania never read or heard about EuroBasket 2025, while 17% of responders listened to podcasts about EuroBasket 2025. In September 2025, BasketNews.lt attracted over 880.000 unique visitors and over 13 million website openings.

On 20 May 2026, the Serbian language version BasketNews.rs was launched.

== Overview ==
The BasketNews.lt staff consists of Lithuanians who create Lithuanian language content about basketball, while the international version BasketNews.com staff consists of Lithuanians and other nationalities journalists who create English language content about basketball. The BasketNews staff provides coverage of basketball events not only from Lithuanian arenas and own studios in Lithuania, but also by regularly visiting basketball competitions and NBA Drafts venues abroad.

The BasketNews.lt regularly stream live in its YouTube.com channel BasketNewsLT Lithuanian language podcasts of series BasketNews.lt podkastas (a broad podcast covering many basketball topics, mostly related with basketball in Lithuania and competitions where Lithuanian teams and players compete), Savas kiemas (a podcast mostly about the Lithuanian Basketball League and Lithuanian clubs), Eurolyga Live (a podcast about EuroLeague), Už Atlanto (a podcast about the National Basketball Association), Prie aikštelės (a podcast where journalist Karolis Tiškevičius discusses with Lithuanian basketball referees, managers, journalists, agents, cheerleaders), Off the Record (a podcast with very long episodes of over one-three hours featuring discussions with notable Lithuanian basketball players, coaches about their careers retrospectives and discussions with Lithuanian basketball clubs managers, owners about their clubs affairs). On 1 October 2025, the last 220th episode of Lithuanian series ENBAS about the National Basketball Association was published. Each episode of the ENBAS series generated thousands of views for BasketNewsLT channel and was published since 14 December 2019.

The BasketNews annually in summers organize BasketNews Camp for young basketball players where they receive training and are visited by basketball personalities.

The BasketNews.lt and BasketNews.com contents are mostly accessible free-of-charge, however since October 2022 some content (e.g. podcasts episodes) is released earlier for paid BN+ subscribers and certain content (e.g. articles, podcasts episodes) is only available for paid BN+ subscribers or for single payments fees.

The Serbian language version BasketNews.rs is written in Gaj's Latin alphabet, not Serbian Cyrillic alphabet, and is dedicated to the Serbian basketball fans.

== Controversy ==
The Lithuanian version of the website includes a column known as Give Me Control, providing analysis and feedback on officiating decisions with the help of referee Todd Warnick. On 22 March 2026, BasketNews announced that EuroLeague had revoked the use of video in the column due to it being "too critical" and affecting the league's image. While the column remains, the website now relies on still images to illustrate the scenario.
