= FHB =

FHB may refer to:

- Fédération Haïtienne de Basket-Ball, the Haitian Basketball Federation
- Fernandina Beach Municipal Airport, in Florida, United States
- FHB Mortgage Bank, a Hungarian bank
- First Hawaiian Bank, an American bank
- Flexor hallucis brevis muscle
- Food and Health Bureau, in Hong Kong
- Fusarium head blight
