= Michael Carey (basketball) =

Bahamian basketball player (born 1993)

Personal information
- Born: 18 August 1993 (age 33) Nassau, Bahamas
- Listed height: 1.96 m (6 ft 5 in)
- Listed weight: 205 lb (93 kg)

Career information
- High school: Lamar Consolidated (Rosenberg, Texas)
- College: San Jacinto (2013–2015): Wagner (2015–2017)
- NBA draft: 2017: undrafted
- Playing career: 2017–present
- Position: Guard
- Number: 23

Career history
- 2017: Soles de Santo Domingo Este
- 2017–2018: Charleville-Mézières
- 2018–2019: Huracanes de Tampico
- 2019: Los Prados
- 2019: Força Lleida
- 2020: Foxes Lausanne Foxes

Career highlights
- First-team All-NEC (2017); Second-team All-NEC (2016)

Michael Cameron Carey (born 18 August 1993) is a Bahamian professional basketball player who last played for the Pully Lausanne Foxes of the Swiss Basketball League. He played college basketball at San Jacinto College and Wagner.

== High school career ==
Carey attended Lamar Consolidated High School in Rosenberg, Texas. He was rated the #1 player in the city of Houston his freshman year by houstonpreps.com. He was also rated a top 100 recruit nationally up until his junior season of high school, but due to the Texas Association of Private and Parochial Schools (TAPPS) ruling him as ineligible due to suspicion of him being a professional athlete, he was forced to sit out his junior year of high school in sports and forfeited all rankings. Carey was rated as a top 100 player by ESPN and rivals all the way up to his second year in high school. As a senior, Carey became a standout guard, leading the Mustangs to a 27–9 overall record and a 13–1 mark in league play while clinching the 2012 District Championship and garnering Second-Team All-District honors.

== College career ==
Originally signed to Texas Tech University, Carey was deemed ineligible by the NCAA for academic reasons. After spending a year in Spain at the Canarias Basketball Academy, he led San Jacinto College to its first NJCAA Division I appearance in ten years. Carey notched 16 double-digit scoring games, eclipsing the 20-point plateau four times. His 2014-15 campaign was highlighted by a career-high 23-point outburst, which came on 10-of-14 shooting, during the Ravens' 129–72 victory over Lone Star College-Kingwood on 11 November.

=== Junior season ===
Carey started in 25 of the 34 games played and became the second-leading scorer on the team at 12.6 points per game (15th among all-Northeast Conference players). Pulled down a team-leading 9.1 caroms a contest (2nd in the NEC; 1st among all guards)... Dished out 1.5 assists a game in 29.1 minutes... Shot 50.3% from the field (7th in the NEC) while converting on 81.0 percent from the free throw line (8th in the conference)... Ranked among the top-15 in blocked shots (0.79 per game) while ranking fourth in the circuit in both offensive rebounds (3.21 a/g; 109 total) and defensive rebounds (5.94 a/g; 202 total)... Of the 34 games played, scored in double-figures in 26 of those contests while hitting the 20-point mark on four occasions, which includes a career-high 28 against the LIU Brooklyn Blackbirds in the 2016 NEC Semifinals (3/5)... Finished the season with 15 double-doubles, the most by a Seahawk since Durell Vinson tallied 14 double-doubles in 2007–08... Grabbed at least five rebounds in 32 of 34 games on the season while recording double-digit caroms in 17 contests, which includes a career-best 17 rebounds in the final game of the regular season at home against Robert Morris (2/27)

Carey earned the title of two-time NEC Player of the Week (2/1 & 2/29), two-time Metropolitan Basketball Writers' Association (MBWA) Men’s Division I Honorable Mention choice (Week of 25–31 January and 22–28 February). He was named 2015-16 All-Northeast Conference Second Team selection, named to the 2016 NEC All-Tournament Team, garnered National Association of Basketball Coaches (NABC) Division I District 18 Second Team honor.

=== Senior season ===
Carey was the lone Seahawk to start in all 30 games during the 2016-17 campaign and averaged 13.8 points per game (10th in the NEC), which was second on the team, while averaging a team-best 9.1 rebounds per contest (1st among all NEC players) in 34.1 minutes a contest (6th in the NEC). He was named to the 2016-17 All-NEC First Team and averaged 2.0 assists a game and shot 47.3% from the field (13th in the NEC) while going 77.4% from the free throw line (9th in the NEC)... Scored in double-figures 21 times on the season while recording 14 double-doubles... Netted 20+ points eight times while eclipsing the 30-point plateau in the 2017 NEC quarterfinals against Fairleigh Dickinson (3/1/17), when he recorded a career-high 32 points on 11-of-15 shooting, 3-of-4 from three-point range, and 7-of-7 from the free-throw line... Followed up that performance with his 27th career double-double, as he finished with 29 points and ten rebounds in the NEC semifinals against Saint Francis U (3/4/17)... Since 1997–98, he was just the sixth Seahawk to record 10 or more double-doubles and only the fourth player in the program to record more than 20 for a career, finishing one behind Durell Vinson ('08), who had 28... Had 14 games in which he recorded double-digit rebounds, highlighted by a career-best 22 at home against Fairleigh Dickinson (1/5/17)

Carey garnered All-NEC Tournament honors for the second straight season after averaging 30.5 points per game, 10.0 rebounds per game in 39.0 minutes. He shot 62.2% from the field and 63.6% from three-point range in the postseason.

Carey was named NEC Player of the Week (1/9/17) and selected to the National Association of Basketball Coaches (NABC) Division I District 18 First Team. He was also invited to play in the 4th Annual Gotham Hoops Invitational and tabbed to the Metropolitan Basketball Writers' Association (MBWA) All-MET Third Team.

== Professional career ==
=== Soles de Santo Domingo Este (2017) ===
After playing at Wagner, Carey started his pro career in 2017 with the Dominican club Soles de Santo Domingo Este. Carey played in 14 games and averaged 12.7 points, 5.5 rebounds and 3.4 assists per game.

=== Étoile Charleville-Mézières (2017) ===
In October 2017, Carey signed with the French club, Étoile Charleville-Mézières. He played in 34 games and averaged 9.2 points, 4.3 rebounds and 2.5 assists per game.

=== Huracanes de Tampico (2018) ===
In September 2018, Carey signed with the Mexican club Huracanes de Tampico. He played in 11 games and averaged 15.1 points, 3.6 rebounds and 2.8 assists per game.

=== Los Prados (2019) ===
In the summer of 2019 Carey signed with Los Prados in TBS League in Dominican Republic, but left the team in June. In two TBS games he averaged 13 points, 2 rebounds and 4 assists per game.

=== Força Lleida (2019) ===
In August 2019, he signed for the Spanish club Força Lleida.

=== Pully Lausanne Foxes (2020) ===
On 12 March 2020 Carey signed with Pully Lausanne Foxes of the Swiss Basketball League.

== National team ==
Carey has played for the Bahamas national team since 2009. Carey represented the Bahamas in the 2009 U16 FIBA Americas tournament and averaged 20.9 points, 10.5 rebounds, and 3.5 assists per game. In 2016 Carey represented the Bahamas at 2016 Centrobasket and averaged 8.2 points, 4.4 rebounds, and 3.5 assists per game. In the 2018 Central American and Caribbean Games, Carey averaged 11.3 points, 2.5 rebounds, and 2 assists per game. In the 2019 FIBA Basketball World Cup qualification Carey averaged 11.5 points, 4.3 rebounds, and 2.5 assists per game along with the Men’s FIBA America’s Pre Qualifiers 20.8 points, 6.8 rebounds and 3 assists per game.
