= 1960 pre-Olympic basketball tournament =

1960 Pre-Olympic Basketball Tournament
For Men

Tournament details
- Host country: Italy
- Dates: 13–20 August
- Teams: 18 (from 5 confederations)
- Venue: 1 (in 1 host city)

The 1960 pre-Olympic basketball tournament was the final qualifying tournament for basketball at the 1960 Summer Olympics at Rome, and was held at the Palazzo dello Sport in Bologna on August 13–20. Teams were divided into two pools, with both pools having distinct preliminary and final rounds; the preliminary round in every pool was divided into two groups with either 4 or 5 teams. The top two teams per group advanced to the final round. The best two from each final round qualified directly for the Olympic Games, and the fifth spot was decided between the third best of both groups in a final match.

== First pool ==
=== Preliminary round ===
Qualified for the final round

==== Group A ====
Team	W	L	PF	PA	PD	Pts
Belgium	3	0	230	185	+45	6
Canada	2	1	203	198	+5	5
West Germany	1	2	204	180	+24	4
Thailand	0	3	179	253	−74	3

Canada	61–60	West Germany
Scoring by half: 32-26, 29-34

Belgium	87–65	Thailand
Scoring by half: 50-28, 37-37

Belgium	67–60	West Germany
Scoring by half: 27-33, 40-27

Thailand	62–82	Canada
Scoring by half: 31-52, 31-30

Belgium	76–60	Canada
Scoring by half: 43-28, 33-32

West Germany	84–52	Thailand
Scoring by half: 39-24, 45-28

==== Group B ====
Team	W	L	PF	PA	PD	Pts
Czechoslovakia	4	0	389	214	+175	8
Spain	3	1	300	213	+87	7
Formosa	2	2	301	318	-17	6
Suriname	1	3	246	344	-98	5
Sudan	0	4	204	351	-147	4

Suriname	61–51	Sudan
Scoring by half: 32-25, 29-26

Formosa	55–83	Spain
Scoring by half: 28-39, 27-44

Sudan	40–88	Spain
Scoring by half: 14-37, 26-51

Suriname	49–121	Czechoslovakia
Scoring by half: 21-63, 28-58

Spain	52–64	Czechoslovakia
Scoring by half: 21-26, 31-38

Formosa	84–67	Sudan
Scoring by half: 37-32, 47-35

Spain	77–54	Suriname
Scoring by half: 46-19, 31-35

Czechoslovakia	86–67	Formosa
Scoring by half: 43-28, 43-39

Czechoslovakia	118–46	Sudan
Scoring by half: 57-24, 61-22

Formosa	95–82	Suriname
Scoring by half: 39-33, 56-49

=== Final round ===
- Results from Belgium-Canada and Spain-Czechoslovakia were carried over.

Qualified for the Olympics

Team	W	L	PF	PA	PD	Pts	Tie
Czechoslovakia	2	1	206	189	+17	5	1.08
Spain	2	1	193	184	+9	5	0.99
Belgium	2	1	217	209	+8	5	0.95
Canada	0	3	176	210	-34	3	

Czechoslovakia	74–67	Canada
Scoring by half: 35-29, 39-38

Belgium	71–81	Spain
Scoring by half: 39-42, 32-39

Belgium	70–68	Czechoslovakia
Scoring by half: 40-40, 30-28

Spain	60–49	Canada
Scoring by half: 30-33, 30-16

== Second pool ==
=== Preliminary round ===
Qualified for the final round

==== Group C ====
Team	W	L	PF	PA	PD	Pts
Hungary	3	0	272	196	+76	6
Yugoslavia	2	1	259	187	+72	5
Austria	1	2	177	215	−39	4
Great Britain	0	3	149	259	−110	3

Hungary	94–92 ()	Yugoslavia
Scoring by half: 36-38, 49-47 Overtime: 9-7

Great Britain	62–67	Austria
Scoring by half: 27-29, 35-38

Hungary	76–55	Austria
Scoring by half: 33-32, 43-23

Yugoslavia	90–38	Great Britain
Scoring by half: 48-21, 42-17

Hungary	102–49	Great Britain
Scoring by half: 47-33, 55-16

Austria	55–77	Yugoslavia
Scoring by half: 30-44, 25-33

==== Group D ====
Team	W	L	PF	PA	PD	Pts
Poland	4	0	358	239	+119	8
Israel	3	1	248	213	+35	7
Greece	2	2	298	283	+15	6
Switzerland	1	3	210	289	−79	5
Australia	0	4	265	355	−90	4

Australia	65–115	Poland
Scoring by half: 32-58, 33-57

Israel	65–43	Greece
Scoring by half: 26-28, 39-15

Australia	64–68	Switzerland
Scoring by half: 29-42, 35-26

Poland	78–53	Israel
Scoring by half: 42-21, 36-32

Israel	66–43	Switzerland
Scoring by half: 31-17, 35-26

Poland	77–76	Greece
Scoring by half: 36-36, 41-40

Switzerland	54–71	Greece
Scoring by half: 26-31, 28-40

Israel	64–49	Australia
Scoring by half: 25-32, 39-17

Switzerland	45–88	Poland
Scoring by half: 18-32, 27-56

Greece	108–87	Australia
Scoring by half: 53-38, 55-49

=== Final round ===
- Results from Hungary-Yugoslavia and Poland-Israel were carried over.

Qualified for the Olympics

Team	W	L	PF	PA	PD	Pts	Tie
Yugoslavia	2	1	225	219	+6	5	1.03
Hungary	2	1	240	232	+8	5	1.00
Poland	2	1	204	184	+20	5	0.96
Israel	0	3	176	210	-34	3	

Hungary	86–78	Israel
Scoring by half: 33-36, 53-42

Poland	64–71	Yugoslavia
Scoring by half: 33-33, 31-38

Israel	61–62	Yugoslavia
Scoring by half: 32-26, 29-26

Hungary	60–62	Poland
Scoring by half: 28-30, 32-32

== 5th-8th Place ==
=== 5th place match ===
- The winner earned the final spot in the 1960 Olympic Summer Games.

Poland	68–58	Belgium

=== 7th place match ===
Canada	60–59	Israel

== Final standings ==
=== First pool ===
Qualified for the Olympics

Rank	Team	Record
1	Czechoslovakia	5-1
2	Spain	5-1
3	Belgium	5-2
4	Canada	2-3
5	West Germany	2-2
6	Formosa	2-3
7	Thailand	1-3
8	Suriname	1-4
9	Sudan	0-4

=== Second pool ===
Qualified for the Olympics

Rank	Team	Record
1	Yugoslavia	4-1
2	Hungary	4-1
3	Poland	6-1
4	Israel	3-3
5	Greece	3-2
6	Austria	1-3
7	Great Britain	1-3
8	Switzerland	1-4
9	Australia	0-4
