= Owen Klassen =

Canadian basketball player

No. 29 – Rostock Seawolves
- Position: Power forward / center
- League: Basketball Bundesliga; EuroCup

Personal information
- Born: October 31, 1991 (age 35) Kingston, Ontario
- Listed height: 2.08 m (6 ft 10 in)
- Listed weight: 115 kg (254 lb)

Career information
- High school: Bayridge Secondary (Kingston, Ontario)
- College: Acadia (2009–2014)
- NBA draft: 2014: undrafted
- Playing career: 2014–present

Career history
- 2014–2015: MZT Skopje
- 2015–2016: Phoenix Hagen
- 2016–2017: Budućnost Podgorica
- 2017: PAOK
- 2017–2018: s.Oliver Würzburg
- 2018–2019: MHP Riesen Ludwigsburg
- 2019–2020: Antwerp Giants
- 2020: Hamilton Honey Badgers
- 2020–2021: Boulazac Basket Dordogne
- 2021–2022: Löwen Braunschweig
- 2022–2023: EWE Baskets Oldenburg
- 2023–2025: Würzburg Baskets
- 2025–present: Rostock Seawolves

Career highlights
- All-CEBL Second Team (2020); Montenegrin League champion (2017); Montenegrin Cup winner (2017); Phoenix Hagen Team of the Century
Medals
Men's basketball
Representing Canada
Universiade
Silver medal – second place	2011 Shenzhen	National team

Owen James Klassen (born October 31, 1991) is a Canadian professional basketball player for Rostock Seawolves of the Basketball Bundesliga (BBL) and the EuroCup. He played university basketball at Acadia University and is a current member of the Canadian national basketball team.

== Professional career ==
In September 2014, Owen started his professional career overseas at Macedonian Adriatic League team MZT Skopje, at the time coached by Zmago Sagadin. His contract was terminated by mutual agreement in March 2015, after a prognosis that a full recovery from an already lengthy back injury of his would last longer than previously expected.

On July 31, 2015, Klassen signed with Phoenix Hagen. On December 1, 2015, Owen was named German BBL Round 10 Player of the Week following an impressive 17 point, 10 rebound performance in a win over EWE Baskets Oldenburg.

On May 2, 2016, he re-signed with Hagen for one more season. On December 8, 2016, he left Hagen and signed with Montenegrin club Budućnost Podgorica for the rest of the season.

On August 3, 2017, Klassen signed with the Greek League club PAOK. On December 21, 2017 PAOK announced the end of their corporation. The same day he signed with German club s.Oliver Würzburg.

On July 27, 2018, he signed with Riesen Ludwigsburg.

In July 2019, Klassen signed with the Antwerp Giants. During the 2019-20 season, he averaged 10 points and six rebounds per game.

On August 13, 2020, he signed with Boulazac Basket Dordogne of the LNB Pro A.

On August 13, 2021, he has signed with Löwen Braunschweig of the Basketball Bundesliga.

On July 19, 2022, he has signed with EWE Baskets Oldenburg of the Basketball Bundesliga.

On June 24, 2025, he signed with Rostock Seawolves of the Basketball Bundesliga (BBL).

== Career statistics ==
Legend
GP	Games played	GS	Games started	MPG	Minutes per game
FG%	Field goal percentage	3P%	3-point field goal percentage	FT%	Free throw percentage
RPG	Rebounds per game	APG	Assists per game	SPG	Steals per game
BPG	Blocks per game	PPG	Points per game	**Bold**	Career high

=== College ===
Year	Team	GP	GS	MPG	FG%	3P%	FT%	RPG	APG	SPG	BPG	PPG
2009–10	Acadia	**20**	13	28.1	.500	.377	.684	7.6	1.5	**1.0**	1.1	10.5
2010–11	Acadia	**20**	**20**	**32.5**	.420	.349	.686	9.6	1.7	.9	**1.9**	18.3
2011–12	Acadia	18	18	30.7	.520	**.514**	.717	10.1	2.2	.9	1.5	16.5
2012–13	Acadia	16	16	30.2	.500	.233	**.775**	**10.8**	**2.5**	**1.0**	1.4	16.3
2013–14	Acadia	17	17	29.8	**.562**	.316	.683	10.6	2.4	.8	1.2	**20.0**
Career		91	84	30.3	.501	.358	.710	9.8	2.1	.89	1.41	16.4

=== Regular season ===
Year	Team	GP	GS	MPG	FG%	3P%	FT%	RPG	APG	SPG	BPG	PPG
2014–15	MZT	26	26	16.1	.579	.222	.550	5.4	.5	.5	.4	5.7
2015–16	Hagen	33	33	22.7	.516	.286	.541	6.4	1.3	.7	.6	9.4
2016–17	Hagen	9	9	**27.1**	.647	.400	.543	**7.8**	**1.8**	1.1	.7	**13.2**
2016–17	Budućnost	15	15	23.4	.652	.375	.683	6.3	1.1	.8	.6	9.5
2017–18	PAOK	18	18	15.7	.412	**.500**	.672	4.7	.5	.5	.2	6.1
2017–18	Würzburg	21	21	20.8	.566	.000	.750	5.5	.9	.4	.4	8.6
2018–19	Ludwigsburg	**43**	**43**	20.6	.549	.259	**.776**	6.1	.9	.3	.5	9.8
2019–20	Antwerp	37	37	21.6	.503	.362	.635	6.6	1.7	.6	.8	9.3
2020–21	Hamilton	8	8	20.0	.442	.200	.615	6.5	1.3	1.1	**1.1**	8.5
2020–21	Boulazac	18	18	19.6	.563	.200	.702	5.3	1.6	.9	.5	7.0
2021–22	Braunschweig	35	35	21.7	.579	.143	.629	6.3	1.6	.6	.7	11.0
2022–23	Oldenburg	33	33	18.1	.587	.000	.669	6.0	1.7	.6	.4	9.7
2023–24	Würzburg	32	32	18.1	.596	**.500**	.534	5.9	.8	.8	.7	7.8
2024–25	Würzburg	27	27	23.9	.585	.000	.511	6.9	1.9	**1.1**	.6	7.2
Career		354	354	20.4	.560	.284	.634	6.1	1.3	.6	.6	8.7

==== Playoffs ====
Year	Team	GP	GS	MPG	FG%	3P%	FT%	RPG	APG	SPG	BPG	PPG
2017	Budućnost	3	3	23.3	.400	.000	.600	5.0	1.0	0.0	.7	6.0
2023	Würzburg	7	7	20.4	.529	.000	.692	4.7	.7	0.9	.2	6.7
Career		10	10	21.3	.489	.000	.652	4.8	0.8	1.7	0.3	6.5

=== International ===
Year	Competition	GP	GS	MPG	FG%	3P%	FT%	RPG	APG	SPG	BPG	PPG
2011	2011 Pan American Games	4	4	22.0	.444	.357	.800	7.5	1.3	.5	.8	9.8
2013	FISU Universiade	8	0	18.8	.657	.000	.620	7.3	.9	.3	.6	6.8
2019	2019 FIBA Basketball World Cup	11	0	15.6	.500	.182	.800	5.2	.7	.3	.7	5.8
2020	2022 FIBA AmeriCup qualification	4	0	22.8	.435	.000	.500	6.5	.5	.3	.8	6.5
2023	2023 FIBA Basketball World Cup Qualification (Americas)	6	0	12.5	.722	.000	.714	5.0	1.7	.5	.2	5.2
Career		33	0	18.4	.552	.269	.687	6.3	1.0	.4	.6	6.8

In 2014, Owen was a member of the Canadian National team's 11 game European tour.
