= Aruba men's national under-16 basketball team =

Aruba
- FIBA zone: FIBA Americas

Americas Championships
- Appearances: None

The Aruba national under-16 basketball team is a national basketball team of Aruba, administered by the Aruba Basketball Bond.

It represents the country in international under-16 (under age 16) basketball competitions.

It appeared at the 2016 CBC U16 Championship.

== See also ==
- Aruba men's national basketball team
- Aruba men's national under-18 basketball team
- Aruba women's national under-17 basketball team
