= Dominica men's national under-16 basketball team =

Dominica
- FIBA zone: FIBA Americas

Americas Championships
- Appearances: None

The Dominica national under-16 basketball team is a national basketball team of Dominica, administered by the Dominica Amateur Basketball Association.

It represents the country in international under-16 (under age 16) basketball competitions.

It appeared at the 2016 CBC U16 Championship.

== See also ==
- Dominica men's national basketball team
