= D'Shon Taylor =

Bahamaian basketball player (born 1993)

D’Shon Taylor
No. 9 – Commonwealth Bank Giants
- Position: Guard
- League: NPBA

Personal information
- Born: January 18, 1993 (age 33) Nassau, The Bahamas
- Listed height: 1.96 m (6 ft 5 in)

Career information
- College: JBU (2012–2013); Garden City (2013–2014); Norfolk State (2014–2016)
- Playing career: 2016–present

Career history
- 2016–2017: Al-Mina'a
- 2017–present: Commonwealth Bank Giants

Career highlights
- NPBA champion (2018, 2019); All-SAC Tournament team (2013)

D'Shon Devard Taylor (born January 18, 1993) is a Bahamian professional basketball player for Commonwealth Bank Giants of the NPBA.

== Early life ==
In 2012, Taylor led the R.M. Bailey Pacers to a Government Secondary Schools Sports Association (GSSSA) title and a Hugh Campbell Invitational title in the same year. As a senior he averaged 23 points, 10 rebounds and five assists.

== College career ==
Taylor started is college career with John Brown University where he averaged 9.7 points and 5.3 rebounds per game as a freshman and was named to the All-Sooner Athletic Conference Tournament team. Prior to his sophomore season, he transferred to Garden City Community College where he went on to average 7.4 points and 3.2 rebounds per game. The following season he transferred again, this time to Norfolk State University. He played two seasons for the Spartans where he averaged 13.1 points and 5.1 rebounds in 67 games.

In January 2015, D'Shon Taylor scored 19 of his then career-high 25 points in the second half to lead his Norfolk State Spartans past Bethune-Cookman 79–55. Taylor tied a then career-best with five 3-pointers.

== Professional career ==
In 2016, Taylor signed with Al-Mina'a of the Iraqi Basketball League. He was released by the team in January 2017.

Later in 2017, Taylor joined the Commonwealth Bank Giants of the NPBA. He helped the team win the NPBA championship in 2018 and 2019.

== Bahamas national team ==
Taylor was part of his home country's national team at the 2022 FIBA AmeriCup qualification in Baha Mar. He averaged 10.5 points, 3.5 rebounds and 2.5 assists in the previous window and scored 14 in the win over Mexico.
