= Gimnasio Ciudad de la Asunción =

Indoor sporting arena

Coordinates: 11°1′31″N 63°51′29″W

Gimnasio Ciudad de La Asunción
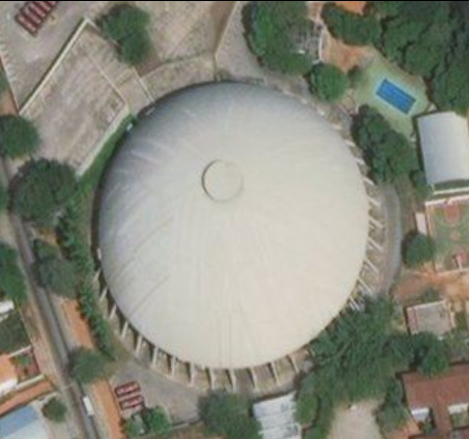
- Location: La Asunción, Nueva Esparta, Venezuela
- Owner: Gobierno del Estado Nueva Esparta
- Capacity: 8.500
- Opened: 1993

Tenants
- Guaiqueríes de Margarita

Gimnasio Ciudad de La Asunción is an indoor sporting arena located in La Asunción, Venezuela. The capacity of the arena is 8,500 spectators and is used mostly for basketball. It hosts the Guaiqueríes de Margarita of the Venezuelan Basketball League.
