= Eswatini women's national under-16 basketball team =

Eswatini
- FIBA zone: FIBA Africa

World Championships
- Appearances: None

African Championships
- Appearances: None

The Eswatini women's national under-16 basketball team is a national basketball team of Eswatini, administered by the Swaziland National Basketball Association. It represents the country in women's international under-16 (under age 16) basketball competitions.

It appeared at the 2009 FIBA Africa Under-16 Championship for Women qualifying round.

== See also ==
- Eswatini men's national under-16 basketball team
