= Haiti men's national basketball team =

Haiti
- FIBA ranking: 146 ▼2 (1 September 2026)
- Joined FIBA: 1970
- FIBA zone: FIBA Americas
- National federation: Haitian Basketball Federation

Olympic Games
- Appearances: None

FIBA World Cup
- Appearances: None

FIBA AmeriCup
- Appearances: None
Home	Away

The Haiti national basketball team (French: Équipe nationale du basket-ball du Haiti) represents Haiti in men's international basketball competitions, It is administered by the Haitian Basketball Federation., The team has never participated in the Olympics or World Cup.

== Roster ==
Roster for 2029 FIBA AmeriCup qualification:

Haiti national basketball team roster
Players
Coaches

Pos.	No.	Name	Age – Date of birth	Height	Club	Ctr.
F	0	Marlon Lestin	24 – March 24, 2002	2.06 m (6 ft 9 in)
G	2	Keeving Etienne	25 – January 25, 2001	2.01 m (6 ft 7 in)	Black Forest Panthers	(Germany)
PG	3	Ralph Ruffin	20 – August 9, 2005	1.88 m (6 ft 2 in)
F	5	Webster Simeus	27 – December 19, 1998	2.03 m (6 ft 8 in)	Krepsinio Pulsas	(Lithuania)
SG	6	Jean Ulysse	26 – May 8, 2000	1.91 m (6 ft 3 in)
PF	7	Gide Noel	33 – February 21, 1993	2.01 m (6 ft 7 in)	Alliance Sport Alsace	(France)
G	10	Ronaldo Segu	26 – September 15, 1999	1.83 m (6 ft 0 in)	Maccabi Ironi Ramat Gan	(Israel)
SG	15	Wadson Ambroise	32 – December 11, 1993	1.93 m (6 ft 4 in)
C	25	Cady Lalanne	34 – April 21, 1992	2.08 m (6 ft 10 in)	NLEX Road Warriors	(Philippines)
C	34	Lee Dort	23 – November 24, 2002	2.08 m (6 ft 10 in)	California Golden Bears	(United States)
PG	37	J. J. Saigge	25 – March 8, 2001	1.83 m (6 ft 0 in)	TSG Reutlingen	(Germany)

Head coach

- (United States) Nick Friedman

Legend

- (C) Team captain
- Club field describes current/last pro club
- Age – describes age
  on 12 July 2026

== Notable players ==
Other current notable players from Haiti or of Haitian descent:

Haiti national basketball team roster
Players
Coaches

Pos.	No.	Name	Age – Date of birth	Height	Club	Ctr.
F/C		Skal Labissière	25 – March 18, 1996	2.11 m (6 ft 11 in)	Free agent
F/C		Nerlens Noel	27 – April 18, 1994	2.11 m (6 ft 11 in)	Free agent	(United States)
C		Cady Lalanne	29 – April 22, 1992	2.08 m (6 ft 10 in)	Suwon KT Sonicboom	(South Korea)
C		Schnider Hérard	25 – October 7, 1996	2.08 m (6 ft 10 in)	Free agent
C		Djery Baptiste	26 – November 12, 1995	2.08 m (6 ft 10 in)	Free agent
PF		Marc-Eddy Norelia	28 – February 18, 1993	2.03 m (6 ft 8 in)	Oviedo	(Spain)
SF		Matisse Thybulle	24 – March 18, 1997	1.96 m (6 ft 5 in)	Portland Trail Blazers	(United States)

Legend

- Club – describes current club
- Age – describes age
  on October 18, 2018

== International competitions ==
=== Olympic Games ===
No appearances

=== FIBA World Cup ===
No appearances

=== FIBA AmeriCup ===
No appearances

=== Pan American Games ===
- 1971: 12th place

=== Centrobasket championship ===
- 1975: 6th place
- 1981: 8th place
