= Duane James =

American basketball player (born 1983)

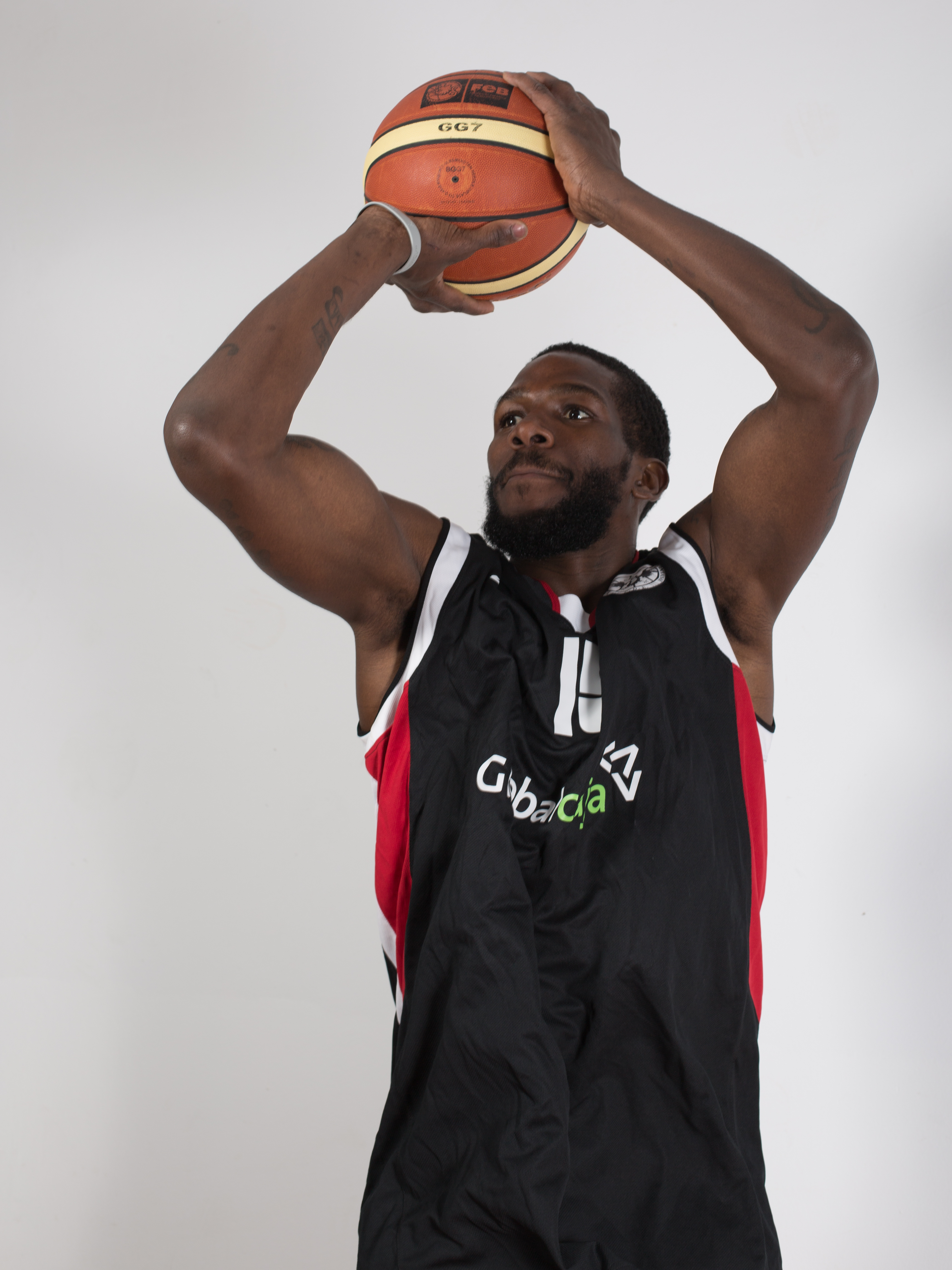

Los Trini's
- Position: Small forward / power forward

Personal information
- Born: 20 January 1983 (age 43) New York City, New York
- Listed height: 6 ft 6 in (1.98 m)
- Listed weight: 216 lb (98 kg)

Career information
- College: Miami Dade JC (2003–2005); Binghamton (2005–2007)
- NBA draft: 2007: undrafted
- Playing career: 2007–present

Career history
- 2007–2008: Horsholm 79ers
- 2008–2009: PAWS London Capital
- 2009: Leicester Riders
- 2009–2010: CB Guadalajara
- 2010–2011: Oviedo CB
- 2011–2012: Real Canoe
- 2012–2014: Basket Globalcaja Quintanar
- 2014: Cáceres 2016 Basket
- 2014–2015: CEBA Guadalajara
- 2015–2016: Fundación CB Granada

Duane Anthony James (born January 20, 1983, in New York City) is a professional basketball player. He is also LeBron James' cousin.

== Pro career ==
He played at Miami Dade Junior College. He completed his last two years of college at Binghamton University (NCAA), averaging 7.6 points and 4.7 rebounds in 20.7 minutes per game during his senior year.

He began his professional experience in Europe in the 2007–08 season, where he played in the first division of Denmark for the Horsholm 79ers. He achieved some spectacular numbers: 15.3 points, 6.3 rebounds, 1.4 assists and 1.8 steals. He was selected to play the All Star 2008. The following year, he went to the UK to play for the PAWS London Capital of the British Basketball League and then for the Leicester Riders.

The 2009–10 season he arrived to Spain after being the third leading scorer in the British Basketball League, with 19.9 points per game, and third best stealer with 2.7 per game. His destination was the CB Guadalajara, but before the end of the year he returned to the UK and BBL to play again for the Leicester Riders, where he averaged 11.4 points, 3.9 rebounds and 1.2 assists, helping the team to reach the semifinals of the playoffs for the title.

In January 2014 he joined the Cáceres 2016 Basket. In the 2015/16 season, he played for Fundación CB Granada, where he averaged 12.5 points, 6.3 rebounds, 1.2 assists and 1.1 steals per game.
