= Surinamese Basketball Association =

Governing body of basketball in Suriname

Surinamese Basketball Association Surinaamse Basketbal Associatie
- Sport: Basketball
- Jurisdiction: Suriname
- Abbreviation: SBA
- Founded: 1947; 79 years ago
- Affiliation: FIBA
- Affiliation date: FIBA: 1961; 65 years ago
- Regional affiliation: FIBA Americas
- Headquarters: Paramaribo

Official website
- sba.sr
- (Suriname)

The Surinamese Basketball Association (Dutch: Surinaamse Basketbal Associatie, SBA), formerly the Surinaamse Basketbal Bond (SBB), is the official basketball federation for Suriname. The federation was founded in 1947 and is based in Paramaribo. It is affiliated with FIBA Americas, the American branch of the international basketball federation FIBA. The SBA is located at the Ismay van Wilgen Sports Hall at 1 Gravenberchstraat.

The president of the SBA is Conrad Issa. He took over the helm from Dilip Sardjoe in early 2019.

The SBA hosted the 2018 FIBA Women's Caribbean Cup at the National Indoor Stadium.
