= Lourawls Nairn Jr. =

Bahamian basketball player

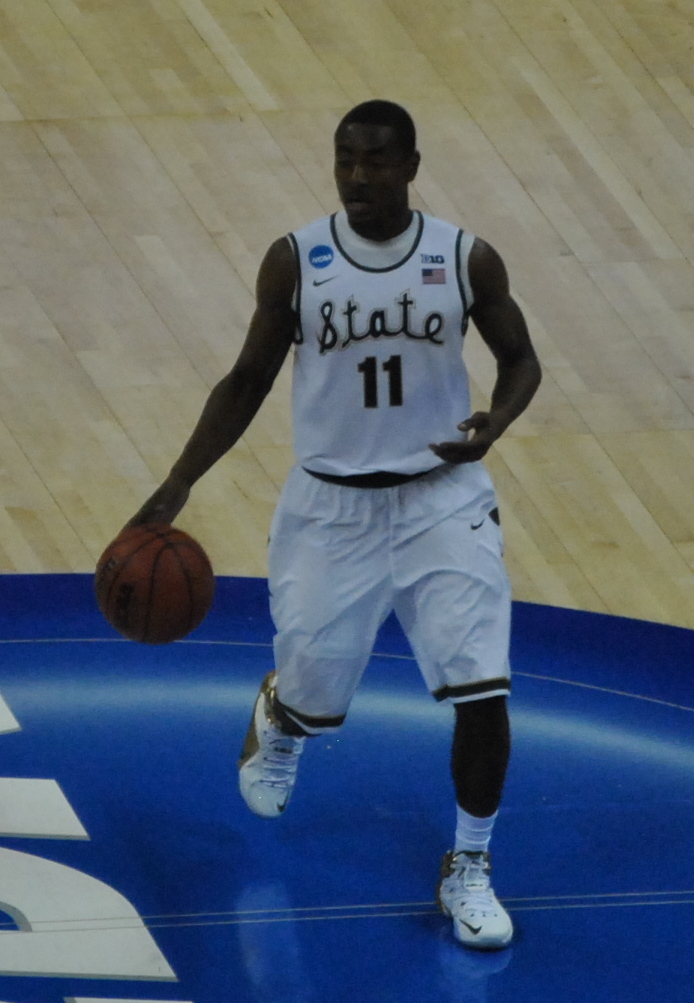
- Nairn with the Michigan State Spartans in 2015

Bowling Green Falcons
- Title: Associate head coach
- League: MAC

Personal information
- Born: October 8, 1994 (age 32) Nassau, The Bahamas
- Listed height: 5 ft 10 in (1.78 m)
- Listed weight: 170 lb (77 kg)

Career information
- High school: Sunrise Christian Academy (Bel Aire, Kansas)
- College: Michigan State (2014–2018)
- NBA draft: 2018: undrafted
- Position: Point guard
- Coaching career: 2021–present

Career history

Coaching
- 2021–2022: Sunrise Christian Academy
- 2022–2023: Southern Utah (assistant)
- 2023–2024: Bowling Green (assistant)
- 2024–present: Bowling Green (associate HC)

Lourawls "Tum Tum" Nairn Jr. (born October 8, 1994) is a Bahamian basketball coach and former player who is the associate head coach for the Bowling Green Falcons of the Mid-American Conference (MAC). He played college basketball for the Michigan State Spartans, where he would return as a graduate manager in 2019. Nairn began his coaching career as head coach at his alma mater, Sunrise Christian Academy, in the 2021–22 season. He moved to the collegiate ranks when he was appointed as an assistant coach for the Southern Utah Thunderbirds in 2022.

== Early life ==
Nairn Jr. was brought up in Nassau, Bahamas. He started playing basketball at the age of twelve.

== College career ==
Nairn Jr. enrolled at Michigan State in 2014. He appeared in 137 games for the team, including 65 starts, averaging 2.5 points in 19.5 minutes per game. As a freshman, he was member of the 2015 Final Four team.

== National team career ==
Nairn Jr. was a member of the Bahamas junior national basketball teams program from the age of 16. On June 28, 2018, he played for the Bahamas senior national basketball team in a 2019 FIBA World Cup qualifying game against the U.S. Virgin Islands, scoring 13 points on 7-for-10 shooting in an 84–74 loss.

== Post-playing career ==
In 2018, Nairn joined the Phoenix Suns front office with a role in player development. On September 6, 2019, he was returned to Michigan State as a graduate manager.

On April 19, 2021, Nairn announced that he was appointed as head coach of the prep basketball team at his alma mater, Sunrise Christian Academy.

On September 7, 2022, Nairn was announced as an assistant coach for the Southern Utah Thunderbirds under head coach Todd Simon. On April 15, 2023, Nairn followed Simon to the Bowling Green Falcons and joined his staff as an assistant coach. He was promoted to the position of associate head coach for the 2024–25 season.

== Personal life ==
Nairn shares the same name as his father, Lourawls Sr., who was named after the singer Lou Rawls. Nairn's nickname, "Tum Tum", is based on a character in the film 3 Ninjas because he had a large appetite as a child.

Nairn is the older brother of LaQuan Nairn who represents The Bahamas internationally in long jump.
