= Aruba men's national basketball team =

Aruba
- FIBA ranking: NR (3 March 2026)
- Joined FIBA: 1986
- FIBA zone: FIBA Americas
- National federation: Aruba Basketball Bond

FIBA AmeriCup
- Appearances: None

Caribbean Championship
- Appearances: 1 (2002)
- Medals: None
Home	Away	Third
Fourth	Fifth	Sixth

The Aruba national basketball team represents Aruba in international competitions. They have yet to appear in the FIBA AmeriCup.

It is managed by the Aruba Basketball Bond.

== Competitive record ==
=== FIBA AmeriCup ===
yet to qualify

=== Caribbean Championship ===
- 1986-1996 : ?
- 1998-2000 : -
- 2002 : 8th
- 2004-15 : -

== See also ==
- Aruba national under-17 basketball team
