= Suriname men's national basketball team =

Suriname
- FIBA ranking: NR (1 September 2026)
- Joined FIBA: 1959
- FIBA zone: FIBA Americas
- National federation: Surinamese Basketball Association (SBA)

FIBA AmeriCup
- Appearances: None

Caribbean Championship
- Appearances: 1 (2015)
- Medals: None

The Suriname national basketball team represents Suriname in international competitions. It is administered by the Surinamese Basketball Association.

== Current roster ==
At the 2015 CBC Championship:

Surinam men's national basketball team roster
Players
Coaches

Pos.	No.	Name	Age – Date of birth	Height	Club	Ctr.
PF	4	Cheraldo Beverdijk	24 – 19 March 1991	1.95 m (6 ft 5 in)
PF	5	Xavier Elburg	18 – 2 October 1996	1.94 m (6 ft 4 in)
G	6	Yves Goedschalk	25 – 12 October 1989	1.89 m (6 ft 2 in)
G	7	Earl Sabajo	33 – 30 October 1981	1.86 m (6 ft 1 in)
G	8	Safiero Fraser	18 – 26 June 1996	1.93 m (6 ft 4 in)
G	9	Xaviro Van Ams	23 – 11 December 1991	1.89 m (6 ft 2 in)
F	10	Randall Wip	30 – 2 May 1985	1.91 m (6 ft 3 in)
G	11	Ryan Van Russell	30 – 9 September 1984	1.88 m (6 ft 2 in)
SF	12	Bruce Mawuli Zamuel	33 – 3 October 1981	1.83 m (6 ft 0 in)
F	13	Daryll Tolud	24 – 11 January 1991	1.89 m (6 ft 2 in)
C	14	Roche Grootfarm	19 – 30 January 1996	1.99 m (6 ft 6 in)
C	15	Sergio De Randamie	30 – 5 July 1984	2.00 m (6 ft 7 in)

Head coach

- (Suriname) Henk Macnack

Assistant coaches

- (Suriname) Dwight Riedewald
- (Suriname) Gilbert Soesman

Legend

- Club – describes last
  club before the tournament
- Age – describes age
  on 15 June 2015

== Hoofdklasse Teams ==
- Yellow Birds
- SNL (Army)
- Caribbean Little Devils
- Dorenas
- De Schakel
- SCVU
- DE AREND
- FAS

== Famous players ==
- de Jong, Sergio - Yellow Birds
- Kloof, Charlon - Yellow Birds
- Renfrum, Mike - Yellow Birds
- Kranthoven, Perl - SNL
- Bhola, Vincent - De Schakel
- Landolf, Errol
- Adasi, Lorenzo - CLD
- Cabenda, Dwight - Dorenas
- Jiawan, Robby - De Schakel
- Meinzak, Milton - De Schakel
- van Engel, Vincent
- Henar, Jahmal - De Schakel
- Eudoxie, Stefano - De Schakel
- De Randamie, Sergio
- Kamperveen, André
- Sabajo, Raymond
- Bergraaf, Jerry
- Graanoogst, Roberto
- Chin A Sen, Diego

== Competitions ==
=== CBC Championship ===
- 2015: 5th place

=== Pan American Games ===
- 1971: 13th place

=== FIBA World Olympic qualifying tournament ===
- 1960: 8th place in the First Pool
