= Haitian Basketball Federation =

Governing body of basketball in Haiti

- Sport: Basketball
- Founded: 1951
- CEO: Henri Jean
- No. of teams: 8
- Country: Haiti

The Haitian Basketball Federation (FHB) (French: Fédération Haïtienne de Basket-Ball) is the governing body of basketball in Haiti. It was founded in 1970 and members of the FIBA since its formation.

The Fédération Haïtienne de Basket-Ball operates the Haiti national team and organizes the Coupe d'Haïti (Haitian Cup) and the national championships.

== Haiti Division I Men's Clubs ==
=== Regional leagues ===
- Cap-Haïtien
- Belladère
- Saint-Marc
- Gonaïves
- Port-au-Prince
- Léogâne
- Les Cayes
- Jacmel
- Cayes
- Miragoâne
- Hinche
- Port-de-Paix
- Trou-du-Nord
- Petit-Goave
- Delmas
- Ouanaminthe
