= Eswatini men's national basketball team =

Eswatini
- FIBA ranking: NR (25 February 2025)
- Joined FIBA: 2000
- FIBA zone: FIBA Africa
- National federation: Basketball Association of Eswatini (BASE)

Olympic Games
- Appearances: None

FIBA World Cup
- Appearances: None

African Championship
- Appearances: None
Home	Away

The Eswatini national basketball team represents Eswatini in international competitions. It is administered by the Basketball Association of Eswatini (BASE).

Eswatini joined the International Federation of Basketball (FIBA) in 2000 and is Africa's youngest member.

== Competitions ==
=== Performance at Summer Olympics ===
yet to qualify

=== Performance at World championships ===
yet to qualify

=== Performance at FIBA Africa Championship ===
yet to qualify

== See also ==
- Eswatini national under-17 basketball team
- Eswatini women's national under-17 basketball team
