= Edgar Garibay =

Mexican basketball player

Personal information
- Born: March 5, 1990 (age 36) Ocotlán, Jalisco, Mexico
- Listed height: 6 ft 11 in (2.11 m)
- Listed weight: 240 lb (109 kg)

Career information
- High school: Compton (Compton, California)
- College: Loyola Marymount (2009–2012); Long Beach State (2012–2014)
- Playing career: 2014–present
- Position: Center

Career history
- 2014–2015: Pioneros
- 2015–2016: Gigantes Edomex
- 2016–2017: Guaiqueríes de Margarita
- 2017–2018: Abejas de León
- 2018–2019: Fuerza Regia
- 2019–2020: Aguacateros de Michoacán
- 2020–2021: Plateros de Fresnillo
- 2021–2022: Leñadores de Durango
- 2022: Peja
- 2022: Halcones de Xalapa
- 2023: Tijuana Zonkeys
- 2023: Halcones de Xalapa
- 2024: Argentino de Junín
- 2024: Pioneros de Delicias
- 2024: Soles de Mexicali
Medals
Men's basketball
Representing Mexico
FIBA AmeriCup
Bronze medal – third place	2017 Argentina

Edgar Garibay Padilla (born March 5, 1990) is a Mexican basketball player who is a member of the Mexico national basketball team, where he participated at the 2015 PanAmerican Games for men, the 2016 Centrobasket Championship in Panama, and the 2016 FIBA Olympic Qualifying Tournament in Turin, Italy.

On January 13, 2022, Garibay signed with KB Peja of the Kosovo Basketball Superleague.
