= Ronaldo Segu =

American basketball player (born 1999)

Slavia Praha
- Position: Point guard
- League: NBL

Personal information
- Born: September 16, 1999 (age 27) Orlando, Florida, U.S.
- Listed height: 6 ft 0 in (1.83 m)
- Listed weight: 160 lb (73 kg)

Career information
- High school: Orlando Christian Prep (Orlando, Florida)
- College: Buffalo (2018–2022)
- NBA draft: 2022: undrafted
- Playing career: 2022–present

Career history
- 2022–2023: Psychiko
- 2023–2024: Borac Čačak
- 2024–2025: Bamberg
- 2025–2026: Maccabi Ramat Gan
- 2026: Iraklis Thessaloniki
- 2026–present: Slavia Praha

Career highlights
- Greek A2 Elite League MVP (2023); Greek A2 Elite League Top Scorer (2023); Second-team All-MAC (2022); MAC Sixth Man of the Year (2020)

Ronaldo Segu (born September 16, 1999) is an American professional basketball player for Slavia Praha of the Czech National Basketball League (NBL). He played college basketball for the Buffalo Bulls from 2018 until 2022.

== Professional career ==
Segu started his professional career with Psychiko of the Greek A2 Basket League. He was voted as the MVP of the league.

On June 29, 2023, he joined Borac Čačak in Serbia.

The following season, Segu joined Bamberg in Germany.

He started the 2025-26 season with Maccabi Ramat Gan in Israel. On March 31, 2026, he joined Iraklis of the Greek Basketball League.

== Personal ==
Segu is of Haitian descent.
