= Saint Lucia men's national basketball team =

Saint Lucia
- FIBA ranking: ▲ (25 February 2025)
- Joined FIBA: 1997
- FIBA zone: FIBA Americas
- National federation: St. Lucia Basketball Federation

FIBA AmeriCup
- Appearances: None

Caribbean Championship
- Appearances: None
Home	Away

The Saint Lucia national basketball team is the national men's basketball team from the island of Saint Lucia. It is administered by the St. Lucia Basketball Federation.

== International Performance ==
=== FIBA AmeriCup ===
yet to qualify

=== Caribbean Championship ===
yet to participate
