= Dominica men's national basketball team =

Dominica
- FIBA ranking: NR (25 February 2025)
- Joined FIBA: 1976
- National federation: Dominica Amateur Basketball Association
- Coach: Mickey Joseph

FIBA AmeriCup
- Appearances: None

Caribbean Championship
- Appearances: 1 (2000)
- Medals: None
Home	Away

The Dominica national basketball team represents the island country of Dominica in international competitions. It is administered by the Dominica Amateur Basketball Association.

Its best result was 6th place at the 2000 Caribbean Championship.

== Competitions ==
=== FIBA AmeriCup ===
yet to qualify

=== Caribebasket ===
- 1981-1996: ?
- 1998: Did not compete
- 2000: 6th
- 2002-2015: Did not compete

== See also ==
- Dominica women's national basketball team
- Dominica national under-17 basketball team
