= Montserrat men's national basketball team =

Montserrat
- FIBA ranking: ▲ (25 February 2025)
- Joined FIBA: 1986
- FIBA zone: FIBA Americas
- National federation: Montserrat Basketball Association
- Coach: Randolph Lewis
- Nickname(s): Emerald Boys

FIBA AmeriCup
- Appearances: None

Caribbean Championship
- Appearances: None
Home	Away

The Montserrat national basketball team is organized and run by the Montserrat Basketball Association.

== International performance ==
=== FIBA AmeriCup ===
yet to qualify

=== Caribbean Championship ===
yet to participate

== Roster ==
Montserrat men's national basketball team roster
Players
Coaches

Pos.	No.	Name	Age – Date of birth	Height	Club
F	4	Emanuel Bradshaw	–
F	7	Dairius Browne	–
G	23	Chad Kirnon	–
G	30	Vachel Murrain	–
G	0	Darren O'Garro	–
F	15	Kherel Le Vyrle Silcott	–
C	11	Jenzil Skerritt	–
F	10	Shaquann Wade	–
F	2	Noel Weekes	–
F	5	Kenneth White	–	6 ft 5 in (1.96 m)
G	8	Dave Williams	–
		Michael Bramble	–
		Kasjuan Sullivan	–
		Christum Weekes	–
		Kriston Yearwood	–

Head coach

- Randolph Lewis

Team Montserrat in 2014

== Coaches ==
Head coach- Randolph Lewis

Team Manager-Jermaine Wade

Coach-Bevon Greenaway
