= Turks and Caicos Islands men's national basketball team =

Turks and Caicos Islands
- FIBA ranking: NR (3 March 2026)
- Joined FIBA: 2002
- FIBA zone: FIBA Americas
- National federation: Turks and Caicos Islands Basketball Federation

FIBA AmeriCup
- Appearances: None

Caribbean Championship
- Appearances: 1 (2004)
- Medals: None
Home	Away

Turks and Caicos Islands national basketball team represents the Turks and Caicos Islands in international competitions. It is administered by the Turks and Caicos Islands Basketball Federation.

Turks and Caicos Islands joined the International Federation of Basketball (FIBA) in 2002 and is the world's second youngest member.

Despite the Turks and Caicos Islands's very small population, its basketball team once qualified for the Caribbean Basketball Championship. At this event, the team played against competition from countries such as Jamaica or Cuba, which have more than sixty times the Turks and Caicos Islands's population size.

== Roster ==
Team that competed at the 2004 Caribbean Basketball Championship: (last publicized squad)

Turks and Caicos Islands men's national basketball team roster
Players
Coaches

Pos.	No.	Name	Age – Date of birth	Height	Club
		Murrick Neal Campbell	27 – 22 December 1976
		Jarrett Dion Forbes	23 – 16 March 1981
		Mervin Michael Forbes	26 – 12 June 1978
		Marcusson Lewellelyn Lightbourn	21 – 13 September 1982
		Levard Sinclair Missick	25 – 8 January 1979
		Alvarado Parker	18 – 10 August 1985
		Trevor Saunders	36 – 18 April 1968
		Lamar Eldrek Skippings	24 – 5 February 1980
		Ira Lawrence Taylor	28 – 16 November 1975
		Michael Sydney Taylor	21 – 24 October 1982
		Stanley Edward Taylor	22 – 7 September 1981
		Toriono Delano Williams	25 – 12 May 1979
		Deanza Macmardo Wilson	26 – 25 April 1978
		Kano Canard Wilson	22 – 27 September 1981

Head coach

- ?

Assistant coach(es)

- ?

Legend

- (C) Team captain
- Club field describes current pro club
- Age – describes age on 12 June 2004

== Competitions ==
=== Performance at FIBA AmeriCup ===
yet to qualify

=== Performance at Caribbean Championship ===
- 2004 : 7th
- 2006 : –
- 2007 : –
- 2009 : –
- 2011 : –
