= Grenada men's national basketball team =

Grenada
- FIBA ranking: 124 (3 March 2026)
- Joined FIBA: 1975
- FIBA zone: FIBA Americas
- National federation: Grenada National Basketball Association

FIBA AmeriCup
- Appearances: None

Caribbean Championship
- Appearances: None
Home	Away

The Grenada national basketball team is the national men's basketball team from the country Grenada. It is administered by the Grenada National Basketball Association.

== International Performance ==
=== FIBA AmeriCup ===
yet to qualify

=== Caribbean Championship ===
yet to participate
