= Colombia men's national basketball team =

Colombia
- FIBA ranking: 55 (3 March 2026)
- Joined FIBA: 1939
- FIBA zone: FIBA Americas
- National federation: Colombia Basketball Federation
- Coach: Tomás Díaz

FIBA World Cup
- Appearances: 1

FIBA AmeriCup
- Appearances: 3
Home	Away

The Colombia national basketball team (Spanish: selección de baloncesto de Colombia) represents Colombia in men's international basketball competitions and organized and run by the Colombia Basketball Federation (Federación Colombiana de Baloncesto).

In South America, Team Colombia made some considerable improvements in the last decade but still stands in the shadow of the Big Four Basketball Powers (Team Argentina, Team Brazil, Team Venezuela and Team Uruguay). Its best result to date remains the 7th place at the 1982 FIBA World Championship where Colombia was host.

== History ==
The development of organized basketball in Colombia began in the mid-20th century, with the national team slowly establishing itself within the South American basketball scene.

Colombia made its first appearance at the FIBA AmeriCup (then known as the Tournament of the Americas) in 1981, marking its entry into continental competition. While the team struggled to advance beyond the early rounds, the participation helped lay the foundation for the country’s basketball program.

In the 1990s and 2000s, Colombia remained a modest competitor in the region, often overshadowed by the traditional South American powers such as Argentina, Brazil, and Venezuela. The team primarily competed in the South American Basketball Championship, where it regularly finished in the middle tier of the standings.

A new generation of Colombian players emerged during the 2010s, many of whom competed professionally in the Baloncesto Profesional Colombiano (the Colombian professional league) and in international leagues. This generation helped Colombia qualify again for the FIBA AmeriCup in 2017, hosted in Medellín. This was Colombia's first appearance at the Americas' prime basketball event. Colombia's standout player, Juan Palacios, power forward in the Basketball Champions League returned to the national team for the first time since 2009. The home-court appearance brought increased visibility to Colombian basketball, although the team was eliminated in the group stage.

In recent years, Colombia has participated in the Basketball World Cup qualification, showing steady improvement and competing against top-ranked teams in the hemisphere. While the team has yet to qualify for a FIBA Basketball World Cup or the Olympic Games, Colombia continues to build its program and develop players capable of competing at a higher international level.

== Competitive record ==
=== FIBA World Cup ===
Year	Position	Tournament	Host
1982	7	1982 FIBA World Championship	Colombia
2019	Did not qualify	2019 FIBA Basketball World Cup	China
2023	Did not qualify	2023 FIBA Basketball World Cup	Philippines, Japan and Indonesia
2027	To be determined	2027 FIBA Basketball World Cup	Qatar

=== FIBA AmeriCup ===
- 2017 – 11th
- 2022 – 9th
- 2025 – 8th

=== Pan American Games ===
- 1951 – 10th
- 1967 – 10th
- 1971 – 10th

=== South American Championship ===
Year	Position	Tournament	Host
1945	6th place	1945 South American Championship for Men	Guayaquil, Ecuador
1953	7th place	1953 South American Championship for Men	Rio de Janeiro, Brazil
1958	6th place	1958 South American Championship for Men	Santiago, Chile
1960	6th place	1960 South American Championship for Men	Córdoba, Argentina
1963	8th place	1963 South American Championship for Men	Lima, Peru
1966	7th place	1966 South American Championship for Men	Mendoza, Argentina
1968	7th place	1968 South American Championship for Men	Asunción, Paraguay
1969	6th place	1969 South American Championship for Men	Montevideo, Uruguay
1971	5th place	1971 South American Championship for Men	Montevideo, Uruguay
1973	6th place	1973 South American Championship for Men	Bogotá, Colombia
1976	5th place	1976 South American Championship for Men	Medellín, Colombia
1977	7th place	1977 South American Championship for Men	Valdivia, Chile
1983	6th place	1983 South American Championship for Men	São José dos Campos
1985	5th place	1985 South American Championship for Men	Medellín, Colombia
1989	7th place	1989 South American Championship for Men	Guayaquil, Ecuador
1991	5th place	1991 South American Championship for Men	Valencia, Venezuela
1997	5th place	1997 South American Championship for Men	Maracaibo, Venezuela
1999	9th place	1999 South American Championship for Men	Bahía Blanca, Argentina
2001	7th place	2001 South American Championship for Men	Valdivia, Chile
2006	5th place	2006 South American Championship for Men	Caracas, Venezuela
2008	5th place	2008 South American Championship for Men	Puerto Montt, Chile
2010	6th place	2010 South American Championship for Men	Neiva, Colombia
2012	7th place	2012 South American Championship for Men	Resistencia, Chaco, Argentina
2016	5th place	2016 South American Basketball Championship	Caracas, Venezuela
2018	To Be Determined	2018 South American Basketball Championship	To Be Determined

== Team ==
=== Current roster ===
Roster for the 2025 FIBA AmeriCup.

Colombia men's national basketball team roster
Players
Coaches

Pos.	No.	Name	Age – Date of birth	Height	Club	Ctr.
PF	0	Luis Almanza	34 – 20 August 1991	1.96 m (6 ft 5 in)	Caribbean Storm Islands	(Colombia)
G	7	Romario Roque	26 – 17 December 1998	1.75 m (5 ft 9 in)	Caribbean Storm Islands	(Colombia)
SF	8	Michaell Jackson (C)	38 – 11 July 1987	1.96 m (6 ft 5 in)	Motilones del Norte	(Colombia)
PG	10	Hansel Atencia	28 – 24 May 1997	1.75 m (5 ft 9 in)	Paisas Basketball	(Colombia)
F	11	Braian Angola	31 – 6 April 1994	1.95 m (6 ft 5 in)	CB Canarias	(Spain)
PF	12	Yildon Mendoza	28 – 8 September 1996	2.06 m (6 ft 9 in)	Toros del Valle	(Colombia)
PG	14	Sebastian Valencia	28 – 3 July 1997	2.00 m (6 ft 7 in)	Caimanes del Llano	(Colombia)
F	18	Miguel Caicedo	24 – 5 February 2001	1.98 m (6 ft 6 in)	Santa Paula de Gálvez	(Argentina)
PF	22	Álvaro Peña	29 – 16 December 1995	1.93 m (6 ft 4 in)	Paisas Basketball	(Colombia)
F	34	Jerson Caicedo	20 – 12 October 2004	2.04 m (6 ft 8 in)	IACC	(Argentina)
C	45	Cristian Solis	24 – 29 May 2001	2.06 m (6 ft 9 in)	Toros del Valle	(Colombia)
PG	70	Octavio Muñoz	24 – 5 February 2001	1.80 m (5 ft 11 in)	Caimanes del Llano	(Colombia)

Head coach

- (Colombia) Tomás Díaz

Assistant coach(es)

- (Venezuela) Ivan García

Legend

- (C) Team captain
- Club – describes last
  club before the tournament
- Age – describes age
  on 22 August 2025

=== Head coach position ===
- (Colombia) Guillermo Moreno: 2001–2006
- (Colombia) Hernán Darío Giraldo: 2008–2012
- (Colombia) Tomás Díaz: 2014
- (Colombia) Guillermo Moreno: 2016–present

=== Past rosters ===
2008 South American Championship: finished 5th among 6 teams

Position	Player	Current club
Guard	Edgar Moreno	Indios de Mayagüez
Guard	Álvaro Contreras	Arrieros de Medellín
Guard	Andrés Arcila	Arrieros de Medellín
Guard	Camilo Londoño	Newman University
Guard	Juan Felipe Montoya	Arrieros de Medellín
Guard & Forward	Felipe Barrios	Cocodrilos de Caracas
Guard & Forward	Norbey Aragón	Guaiqueries de Margarita
Forward & Center	Enielsen Guevara	Gaiteros de Zulia
Forward & Center	Divier Pérez	Arrieros de Medellín
Forward & Center	Adinson Mosquera	Lon Morris JC
Center	Jorge Canedo	Colby County CC

Coach: Hernán Darío Giraldo

2010 Colombia national basketball team roster
Players
Coaches

Pos.	No.	Name	Age – Date of birth	Height	Club
PG	4	Moreno, Edgar	30 – 30 Aug 1981	1.90 m (6 ft 3 in)	Pioneros de Quintana Roo-Cancun
G	5	Bacci, Gianluca	–	1.87 m (6 ft 2 in)	Guerreros de Bogota
F/C	6	Guevara, Enielsen	29 – 21 Nov 1982	2.04 m (6 ft 8 in)	Marinos de Anzoategui
F	7	Fernandez, Yader	–	1.97 m (6 ft 6 in)	?
F/C	8	Mosquera, Adinson	–	2.05 m (6 ft 9 in)	Guerreros de Bogota
SG	9	Ortiz, Stalin	31 – 8 Feb 1981	1.90 m (6 ft 3 in)	Orgullo Paisa de Antioquia
F	10	Cortes, Cesar	–	2.01 m (6 ft 7 in)	Caribbean Heat
G/F	11	Aragon, Norbey	–	1.94 m (6 ft 4 in)	Orgullo Paisa de Antioquia
F/C	12	Perez, Divier	–	2.01 m (6 ft 7 in)	Orgullo Paisa de Antioquia
PG	13	Caicedo, Rodrigo	–	1.80 m (5 ft 11 in)	Patriotas de Boyaca
C	14	John, Hernandez	–	2.07 m (6 ft 9 in)	Bucaros de Bucaramanga
G/F	15	Renteria, Eleutherio	31 – 9 Apr 1981	1.94 m (6 ft 4 in)	Canoneros Norte De Cucuta

Head coach

- Hernan Dario Giraldo

Assistant coach(es)

- Oscar Useche

Legend

- Club – describes last
  club before the tournament
- Age – describes age
  on 30 April 2012

At the 2016 South American Basketball Championship:

Colombia men's national basketball team roster
Players
Coaches

Pos.	No.	Name	Age – Date of birth	Height	Club	Ctr.
PG	4	Rodrigo Caicedo	28 – 27 February 1988	1.78 m (5 ft 10 in)	Cimarrones de Choco	(Colombia)
SG	5	Jorge Salazar	22 – 10 December 1993	1.74 m (5 ft 9 in)	Bucaros	(Colombia)
PF	6	Yildon Mendoza	19 – 8 September 1996	2.06 m (6 ft 9 in)	High School JUCO	(United States)
SF	7	Henry Anzola	18 – 18 February 1998	2.00 m (6 ft 7 in)	High School JUCO	(United States)
F	8	Michaell Jackson	28 – 11 July 1987	1.91 m (6 ft 3 in)	Bucaros	(Colombia)
SF	9	Stalin Ortiz	35 – 8 February 1981	1.91 m (6 ft 3 in)	Condores	(Colombia)
G	10	Hansel Atencia	19 – 24 May 1997	1.78 m (5 ft 10 in)	Liberty Flames basketball	(United States)
C	11	Michael Hinestroza	25 – 16 July 1990	2.06 m (6 ft 9 in)	Academia de la Montaña	(Colombia)
C	12	Divier Perez	27 – 14 April 1989	2.04 m (6 ft 8 in)	Academia de la Montaña	(Colombia)
F	13	Yesid Mosquera	19 – 19 November 1996	1.92 m (6 ft 4 in)	Furman Paladins men's basketball	(United States)
C	14	John Hernandez	32 – 6 January 1984	2.06 m (6 ft 9 in)	Sabios	(Colombia)
F	15	Jhan Mejia	22 – 15 June 1994	2.06 m (6 ft 9 in)	NE Oklahoma A&M CC	(United States)

Head coach

- (Colombia) Guillermo Moreno

Assistant coach(es)

- (Colombia) Tomas Diaz

Legend

- Club – describes last
  club before the tournament
- Age – describes age
  on 26 June 2016

Roster for the 2022 FIBA AmeriCup

Colombia national basketball team – 2022 FIBA AmeriCup roster
Players
Coaches

Pos.	No.	Name	Age – Date of birth	Height	Club	Ctr.
G	0	Pablo Rojas	26 – 20 February 1996	2.00 m (6 ft 7 in)	Lobos Brasília	(Brazil)
G	1	Juan Duarte	25 – 13 February 1997	1.80 m (5 ft 11 in)	Mount Marty University	(United States)
PF	2	Tonny Trocha-Morelos	28 – 21 June 1994	2.06 m (6 ft 9 in)	Cafeteros Basketball	(Colombia)
C	3	Juan Tello (C)	37 – 11 May 1985	2.05 m (6 ft 9 in)	Guaros de Lara Basketball	(Venezuela)
PF	5	Alvaro Peña Muñoz	26 – 16 December 1995	1.93 m (6 ft 4 in)	Cafeteros	(Colombia)
PF	6	Soren De Luque	23 – 8 September 1998	1.96 m (6 ft 5 in)	Titanes de Barranquilla	(Colombia)
G	7	Romario Roque	23 – 17 December 1998	1.75 m (5 ft 9 in)	Caribbean Storm Islands	(Colombia)
PG	10	Hansel Atencia	25 – 24 May 1997	1.75 m (5 ft 9 in)	Caceres patrimonio de la humanidad	(Spain)
C	12	Jaime Echenique	25 – 27 April 1997	2.13 m (7 ft 0 in)	Promitheas BC	(Greece)
PF	14	Yildon Mendoza	25 – 8 September 1996	2.06 m (6 ft 9 in)	Team Cali	(Colombia)
PF	20	Andrés Ibargüen	26 – 14 February 1996	2.00 m (6 ft 7 in)	Caribbean Storm Islands	(Colombia)
SF	55	Hayner Montaño	24 – 2 December 1997	1.90 m (6 ft 3 in)	Team Cali	(Colombia)

Head coach

- (Colombia) Guillermo Moreno

Assistant coach(es)

- (Colombia) Tomas Díaz
- (Colombia) Raul Pabón Porras

Legend

- (C) Team captain
- Club – describes last
  club before the tournament
- Age – describes age
  on 2 September 2022

== See also ==
- Colombia men's national under-17 and under-18 basketball team
- Colombia men's national under-15 basketball team
- Colombia women's national basketball team
