= Basketball at the 2018 Central American and Caribbean Games =

Colombian sports event

- Location: (Colombia) Barranquilla
- Dates: 20 July – 3 August
- Nations: 8
- Teams: 7 (men); 8 (women)

Champions
- Men: Puerto Rico
- Women: Colombia

Basketball at the 2018 Central American and Caribbean Games was held at the Elias Chewing Coliseum in Barranquilla, Colombia. The women's tournament lasted from 20–24 July 2018, whilst the men's tournament lasted from 29 July to 3 August 2018.

== Medal summary ==
=== Medal table ===
* Host nation (Colombia)

Rank	Nation	Gold	Silver	Bronze	Total
1	Colombia (COL)*	1	1	0	2
2	Puerto Rico (PUR)	1	0	1	2
3	Cuba (CUB)	0	1	1	2
Totals (3 entries)		2	2	2	6

=== Events ===
Event	Gold	Silver	Bronze
Men	Puerto Rico Gary Browne; Gian Clavell; Gilberto Clavell; Ramón Clemente; Jorge Díaz; Alexander Franklin; Javier González; David Huertas; Carlos López Sosa; Ángel Matías; Javier Mojica; Ricardo Sánchez	Colombia Luis Almanza; Freddy Asprilla; Hansel Atencia; Jhon Hernández; Michael Hinestroza; Michael Jackson; Héctor Martínez; Jairo Mendoza; Octavio Muñoz; Stalin Ortiz; Álvaro Peña; Jorge Salazar	Cuba Neslier Abreu; Marvin Cairo; Yoel Cubilla; Karel Guzmán; Javier Justiz; Yoanki Mensia; Yuniskel Molina; Osmel Oliva; Jasiel Rivero; Pedro Roque; Oreste Torres; Lisván Valdes
Women	Colombia Tania Acosta; Yanet Arias; Mayra Caicedo; Libia De la Rosa; Carolina López; Mabel Martínez; Narlyn Mosquera; Jenifer Muñoz; María Palacio; Yuliany Paz; Diana Prens; Manuela Ríos	Cuba Yamara Amargo; Suchitel Ávila; Leanyi Becquer; Yuniesky Bouly; Marlene Cepeda; Anilegna Colas; Anisleidy Galindo; Lisdeyvi Martínez; Leidys Oquendo; Arlenys Romero; Edith Thompson; Dairis Tornell	Puerto Rico Ali Gibson; Michelle González; Jazmon Gwathmey; Yolanda Jones; Anushka Maldonado; Tayra Meléndez; India Pagán; Ashley Pérez; Marie Plácido; Isalys Quiñones; Pamela Rosado; Dayshalee Salamán

== Men's tournament ==
All times are local (UTC–5).

=== Group stage ===
==== Group A ====
Pos	Team	Pld	W	L	PF	PA	PD	Pts	Qualification
1	Puerto Rico	2	2	0	162	132	+30	4	Semifinals
2	Colombia (H)	2	1	1	144	138	+6	3	Semifinals
3	Virgin Islands	2	0	2	142	178	−36	2	5–7th place semifinal

Source: Barranquila 2018
Rules for classification: 1) Points; 2) Head-to-head results; 3) Points difference; 4) Points scored.
(H) Hosts

29 July 2018
20:00

Boxscore

Colombia	82–72	Virgin Islands
Scoring by quarter: 30–12, 28–13, 10–24, 14–23
Pts: Atencia 23; Rebs: Jackson, Ortiz 8 Asts: Hinestroza, Jackson 2		Pts: Samuel 16; Rebs: Simmons, Smith 9 Asts: Rivera 4

Referees: Marcos Benito (BRA), Krishna Domínguez (MEX), Jorge Cabrera (CUB)

30 July 2018
20:00

Boxscore

Colombia	62–66	Puerto Rico
Scoring by quarter: 16–11, 24–15, 12–31, 10–9
Pts: Ortiz 14; Rebs: Ortiz 9 Asts: three players 2		Pts: Huertas 15; Rebs: Browne, Mojica 8 Asts: three players 2

Referees: Krishna Domínguez (MEX), Natalia Cuello (DOM), Gabriel Ramírez (MEX)

31 July 2018
17:30

Boxscore

Puerto Rico	96–70	Virgin Islands
Scoring by quarter: 17–13, 24–20, 34–9, 21–28
Pts: Clavell 13; Rebs: four players 5 Asts: Browne 7		Pts: Simmons 27; Rebs: Smith 11; Asts: Adams, Rivera 5

Referees: Julio Anaya (PAN), Krishna Domínguez (MEX), Daylenis Savignet (CUB)

==== Group B ====
Pos	Team	Pld	W	L	PF	PA	PD	Pts	Qualification
1	Cuba	3	2	1	246	221	+25	5 (Note: Cuba 1−1, + 8 PD; Dominican Republic 1−1, 0 PD; Mexico 1−1, − 8 PD)	Semifinals
2	Dominican Republic	3	2	1	227	220	+7	5	Semifinals
3	Mexico	3	2	1	222	212	+10	5	5th place game
4	Bahamas	3	0	3	222	264	−42	3	5–7th place semifinal

Source: Barranquila 2018
Rules for classification: 1) Points; 2) Head-to-head results; 3) Points difference; 4) Points scored.
Notes:

29 July 2018
15:00

Boxscore

Bahamas	65–83	Mexico
Scoring by quarter: 14–22, 13–23, 20–18, 18–20
Pts: Jacob 13; Rebs: Miller 7 Asts: Adderley, Smith 2		Pts: Jor. Gutíerrez 24; Rebs: Ayón 10; Asts: Ayón, Pérez 4

Referees: Julio Anaya (PAN), Alexis Mercado (PUR), Jennifer Hackett (BAR)

29 July 2018
17:30

Boxscore

Cuba	71–74 (OT)	Dominican Republic
Scoring by quarter: 21–9, 16–8, 12–25, 11–18, Overtime: 11–14
Pts: Oliva 15; Rebs: Rivero 11; Asts: Oliva 4		Pts: Suero 25; Rebs: Suero 16; Asts: Dicent 4

Referees: Luis Vázquez (PUR), Kendall Henry (ISV), Carlos Vélez (COL)

30 July 2018
15:00

Boxscore

Dominican Republic	69–72	Mexico
Scoring by quarter: 20–12, 14–29, 19–10, 16–21
Pts: Araújo 16; Rebs: Araújo 10; Asts: Suero 5		Pts: Ayón 19; Rebs: Ayón 9 Asts: Jor. Gutíerrez 6

Referees: Luis Vázquez (PUR), Julio Anaya (PAN), Alexis Mercado (PUR)

30 July 2018
17:30

Boxscore

Cuba	97–80	Bahamas
Scoring by quarter: 25–28, 26–20, 23–10, 23–22
Pts: Guzmán 21; Rebs: Cairo 10; Asts: Oliva 5		Pts: Jacob 13; Rebs: Smith 5 Asts: Jacob 3

Referees: Marcos Benito (BRA), Kendall Henry (ISV), José Melgarejo (COL)

31 July 2018
15:00

Boxscore

Dominican Republic	84–77	Bahamas
Scoring by quarter: 21–22, 20–16, 20–23, 23–16
Pts: Suero 22; Rebs: Suero 7 Asts: Dicent 3		Pts: Carey 17; Rebs: Miller 11; Asts: Carey 5

Referees: Luis Vázquez (PUR), Alexis Mercado (PUR), Jennifer Hackett (BAR)

31 July 2018
20:30

Boxscore

Cuba	78–67	Mexico
Scoring by quarter: 16–24, 19–16, 20–10, 23–17
Pts: Rivero 24; Rebs: Rivero 9 Asts: Oliva 4		Pts: Cruz 18; Rebs: Ayón 13; Asts: Ayón 2

Referees: Marcos Benito (BRA), Kendall Henry (ISV), Carlos Vélez (COL)

=== Fifth to seventh place classification ===
5–7th place semifinal
1 August
Virgin Islands	68
Bahamas	73

5th place
2 August
Bahamas	76
Mexico	90

==== 5–7th place semifinal ====
1 August 2018
15:00

Boxscore

Virgin Islands	68–73	Bahamas
Scoring by quarter: 16–17, 16–22, 19–15, 17–19
Pts: Rivera 15; Rebs: Rivera 9 Asts: Rivera, Simmons 2		Pts: St. Fort 18; Rebs: Smith 13; Asts: Bain 7

Referees: Alexis Mercado (PUR), Jorge Cabrera (CUB), José Melgarejo (COL)

==== Fifth place game ====
2 August 2018
17:30

Boxscore

Bahamas	76–90	Mexico
Scoring by quarter: 22–26, 19–23, 19–23, 16–18
Pts: Smith 21; Rebs: Smith 11; Asts: Bain 7		Pts: Girón 23; Rebs: Jos. Gutiérrez 9 Asts: three players 4

Referees: Luis Vázquez (PUR), Natalia Cuello (DOM), Carlos Vélez (COL)

=== First to fourth place classification ===
Semifinals
1 August
Puerto Rico	75
Dominican Republic	74
1 August
Colombia	78
Cuba	69

Final
3 August
Puerto Rico	91
Colombia	68
Third place
2 August
Dominican Republic	73
Cuba (OT)	75

==== Semifinals ====
1 August 2018
17:30

Boxscore

Puerto Rico	75–74	Dominican Republic
Scoring by quarter: 13–14, 31–17, 16–18, 15–25
Pts: Mojica 12; Rebs: Browne 6 Asts: Browne, Franklin 2		Pts: Araújo 22; Rebs: Araújo 12; Asts: Dicent, Suero 3

Referees: Marcos Benito (BRA), Krishna Domínguez (MEX), Gabriel Ramírez (MEX)

1 August 2018
20:00

Boxscore

Colombia	78–69	Cuba
Scoring by quarter: 20–19, 21–11, 24–12, 13–27
Pts: Jackson 25; Rebs: Jackson 15; Asts: Jackson 4		Pts: Rivero 21; Rebs: Justiz 13; Asts: Oliva 2

Referees: Luis Vázquez (PUR), Julio Anaya (PAN), Natalia Cuello (DOM)

==== Third place game ====
2 August 2018
20:00

Boxscore

Dominican Republic	73–75 (OT)	Cuba
Scoring by quarter: 15–24, 13–14, 18–14, 20–14, Overtime: 7–9
Pts: Araújo 20; Rebs: Suero 10; Asts: Suero 7		Pts: Guzmán 25; Rebs: Justiz 10; Asts: Guzmán 4

Referees: Julio Anaya (PAN), Krishna Domínguez (MEX), Kendall Henry (ISV)

==== Final ====
3 August 2018
14:00

Boxscore

Puerto Rico	91–68	Colombia
Scoring by quarter: 20–16, 25–13, 14–17, 32–22
Pts: Clavell 18; Rebs: Franklin 7 Asts: Browne 6		Pts: Jackson 18; Rebs: Ortiz 10; Asts: Ortiz 2

Referees: Marcos Benito (BRA), Julio Anaya (PAN), Gabriel Ramírez (MEX)

=== Final standings ===
Rank	Team	Record
1st place, gold medalist(s)	Puerto Rico	4–0
2nd place, silver medalist(s)	Colombia	2–2
3rd place, bronze medalist(s)	Cuba	3–2
4	Dominican Republic	2–3
5	Mexico	3–1
6	Bahamas	1–4
7	Virgin Islands	0–3

== Women's tournament ==
=== Group stage ===
==== Group A ====
Pos	Team	Pld	W	L	PF	PA	PD	Pts	Qualification
1	Cuba	3	3	0	234	128	+106	6	Semifinals
2	Colombia (H)	3	2	1	185	157	+28	5	Semifinals
3	Virgin Islands	3	1	2	176	185	−9	4	5–8th place semifinals
4	Jamaica	3	0	3	96	221	−125	3	5–8th place semifinals

Source: Barranquila 2018
Rules for classification: 1) Points; 2) Head-to-head results; 3) Points difference; 4) Points scored.
(H) Hosts

20 July 2018
15:30

Boxscore

Jamaica	23–87	Cuba
Scoring by quarter: 8–16, 3–24, 7–21, 5–26
Pts: Dixon 8 Rebs: Dixon, Higgins 7 Asts: Higgins 2		Pts: Galindo 15; Rebs: Bouly 9 Asts: Colás 3

Referees: Julio Anaya (PAN), Krishna Domínguez (MEX), Jennifer Hackett (BAR)

20 July 2018
20:30

Boxscore

Virgin Islands	55–67	Colombia
Scoring by quarter: 21–19, 4–17, 13–22, 17–9
Pts: Tate 25; Rebs: Day 9 Asts: Bough 3		Pts: Arias 18; Rebs: Arias, Mosquera 10; Asts: Arias, Muñoz 3

Referees: Marcos Benito (BRA), Gabriel Ramírez (MEX), Alexis Mercado (PUR)

21 July 2018
15:30

Boxscore

Cuba	81–54	Virgin Islands
Scoring by quarter: 17–18, 19–8, 15–11, 30–17
Pts: Ávila 17; Rebs: Ávila 10; Asts: Martínez 3		Pts: Tate 15; Rebs: George 10; Asts: Bough 2

Referees: Marcos Benito (BRA), Jennifer Hackett (BAR), Gabriel Ramírez (MEX)

21 July 2018
20:30

Boxscore

Colombia	67–36	Jamaica
Scoring by quarter: 16–15, 13–7, 19–6, 19–8
Pts: Acosta 20; Rebs: Arias 10; Asts: Muñoz 3		Pts: Lamonth 11; Rebs: Lamonth 16; Asts: Higgins 2

Referees: Natalia Cuello (DOM), Alexis Mercado (PUR), Krishna Domínguez (MEX)

22 July 2018
15:30

Boxscore

Virgin Islands	67–37	Jamaica
Scoring by quarter: 14–12, 18–13, 20–4, 158
Pts: Tate 18; Rebs: Day, Hamilton 9 Asts: Bough 4		Pts: Cowan, Higgins 11; Rebs: Lamonth 11; Asts: Higgins 4

Referees: Jennifer Hackett (BAR), Julio Anaya (PAN), Gabriel Ramírez (MEX)

22 July 2018
20:30

Boxscore

Cuba	66–51	Colombia
Scoring by quarter: 22–13, 23–7, 12–15, 9–16
Pts: Galindo 16; Rebs: Cepeda 11; Asts: Martínez, Romero 3		Pts: Arias 11; Rebs: Mosquera 13; Asts: Caicedo 3

Referees: Marcos Benito (BRA), Krishna Domínguez (MEX), Alexis Mercado (PUR)

==== Group B ====
Pos	Team	Pld	W	L	PF	PA	PD	Pts	Qualification
1	Puerto Rico	3	3	0	288	142	+146	6	Semifinals
2	Mexico	3	2	1	246	127	+119	5	Semifinals
3	Guatemala	3	1	2	125	251	−126	4	5–8th place semifinals
4	Barbados	3	0	3	130	269	−139	3	5–8th place semifinals

Source: Barranquila 2018
Rules for classification: 1) Points; 2) Head-to-head results; 3) Points difference; 4) Points scored.

20 July 2018
13:00

Boxscore

Puerto Rico	112–36	Guatemala
Scoring by quarter: 25–10, 32–11, 27–8, 28–7
Pts: González 20; Rebs: Jones 8 Asts: Rosado, Salaman 3		Pts: A. Rosales 6 Rebs: González 7 Asts: Larrañaga 3

Referees: Carlos Vélez (COL), Kendall Henry (ISV), Daylenis Savignet (CUB)

20 July 2018
18:00

Boxscore

Mexico	97–34	Barbados
Scoring by quarter: 33–9, 26–10, 24–6, 14–9
Pts: Ávila, Domínguez 16; Rebs: Domínguez 13; Asts: Ávila 6		Pts: Small 11; Rebs: Small 9 Asts: none

Referees: Natalia Cuello (DOM), José Melgarejo (COL), Jorge Cabera (CUB)

21 July 2018
13:00

Boxscore

Guatemala	26–83	Mexico
Scoring by quarter: 9–24, 6–16, 8–22, 3–21
Pts: García, E. Rosales 6 Rebs: E. Rosales 8 Asts: three players 1		Pts: Castro 13; Rebs: Valenzuela 10; Asts: Ávila, Pardo 4

Referees: Kendall Henry (ISV), José Melgarejo (COL), Jorge Cabrera (CUB)

21 July 2018
18:00

Boxscore

Barbados	40–109	Puerto Rico
Scoring by quarter: 11–33, 9–24, 11–25, 9–27
Pts: Small 28; Rebs: Small 9 Asts: Flatts 2		Pts: Salaman 15; Rebs: Pagan 6 Asts: Rosado, Salaman 8

Referees: Julio Anaya (PAN), Daylenis Savignet (CUB), Carlos Vélez (COL)

22 July 2018
13:00

Boxscore

Guatemala	63–56	Barbados
Scoring by quarter: 23–11, 10–17, 12–15, 18–13
Pts: L. Rivás, E. Rosales 17; Rebs: López 6 Asts: E. Rosales 3		Pts: Atherley 24; Rebs: Alleyne 12; Asts: Daniel 4

Referees: Daylenis Savignet (CUB), José Melgarejo (COL), Jorge Cabrera (CUB)

22 July 2018
18:00

Boxscore

Mexico	66–67	Puerto Rico
Scoring by quarter: 11–17, 21–15, 22–17, 12–18
Pts: Ramos 21; Rebs: Castro 10; Asts: Ávila, Domínguez 3		Pts: Salaman 15; Rebs: Melendez 11; Asts: Rosado 4

Referees: Natalia Cuello (DOM), Carlos Vélez (COL), Kendall Henry (ISV)

=== Fifth to eighth place classification ===
5–8th place semifinals
23 July
Virgin Islands	79
Barbados	53
23 July
Guatemala	57
Jamaica	62

5th place
24 July
Virgin Islands	76
Jamaica	61
7th place
24 July
Barbados	53
Guatemala	72

==== 5–8th place semifinals ====
23 July 2018
13:00

Boxscore

Virgin Islands	79–53	Barbados
Scoring by quarter: 24–13, 21–20, 21–14, 13–8
Pts: Day 22; Rebs: Day 16; Asts: Bough 6		Pts: Small 19; Rebs: Small 19; Asts: Daniel 4

Referees: Gabriel Ramírez (MEX), Jorge Cabrera (CUB), José Melgarejo (COL)

23 July 2018
15:30

Boxscore

Guatemala	57–62	Jamaica
Scoring by quarter: 12–15, 10–16, 20–17, 15–14
Pts: Vásquez 24; Rebs: Vásquez 6 Asts: E. Rosales 3		Pts: Higgins 19; Rebs: Lamonth 15; Asts: Dixon 5

Referees: Daylenis Savignet (CUB), Krishna Domínguez (MEX), Alexis Mercado (PUR)

==== Seventh place game ====
24 July 2018
13:00

Boxscore

Barbados	53–72	Guatemala
Scoring by quarter: 16–25, 8–10, 12–21, 17–16
Pts: Cumberbatch 12; Rebs: Atherley 10; Asts: Alleyne, Daniel 1		Pts: Vásquez 18; Rebs: Vásquez 11; Asts: E. Rosales 8

Referees: Gabriel Ramírez (MEX), Jorge Cabrera (CUB), José Melgarejo (COL)

==== Fifth place game ====
24 July 2018
15:30

Boxscore

Virgin Islands	76–61	Jamaica
Scoring by quarter: 25–17, 21–9, 14–17, 16–18
Pts: Carey, Day 20; Rebs: Hamilton 9 Asts: Bough 8		Pts: Higgins 19; Rebs: Lamonth 12; Asts: Higgins 4

Referees: Jennifer Hackett (BAR), Carlos Vélez (COL), Alexis Mercado (PUR)

=== First to fourth place classification ===
Semifinals
23 July
Cuba	86
Mexico	58
23 July
Puerto Rico	59
Colombia	63

Final
24 July
Cuba	65
Colombia (OT)	67
Third place
24 July
Mexico	52
Puerto Rico	60

==== Semifinals ====
23 July 2018
18:00

Boxscore

Cuba	86–58	Mexico
Scoring by quarter: 22–17, 23–10, 19–18, 22–13
Pts: Amargo 26; Rebs: Cepeda 11; Asts: Martínez 3		Pts: Castro 18; Rebs: Valenzuela 9 Asts: Ávila, Valenzuela 2

Referees: Natalia Cuello (DOM), Julio Anaya (PAN), Carlos Véles (COL)

23 July 2018
20:30

Boxscore

Puerto Rico	59–63	Colombia
Scoring by quarter: 13–15, 14–9, 14–19, 18–20
Pts: Gwathmey 17; Rebs: Gwathmey 9 Asts: Rosado 2		Pts: Martínez 21; Rebs: Arias 13; Asts: Arias 3

Referees: Marcos Benito (BRA), Jennifer Hackett (BAR), Kendall Henry (ISV)

==== Third place game ====
24 July 2018
18:00

Boxscore

Mexico	52–60	Puerto Rico
Scoring by quarter: 15–15, 14–12, 9–20, 14–13
Pts: Ávila 17; Rebs: Ávila 8 Asts: Ávila 4		Pts: Pérez 17; Rebs: Gwathmey 10; Asts: four players 1

Referees: Julio Anaya (PAN), Kendall Henry (ISV), Daylenis Savignet (CUB)

==== Final ====
24 July 2018
20:30

Boxscore

Cuba	65–67 (OT)	Colombia
Scoring by quarter: 17–15, 13–8, 9–18, 16–14, Overtime: 10–12
Pts: Ávila 22; Rebs: Cepeda 24; Asts: Romero 4		Pts: Arias 16; Rebs: Mosquera 14; Asts: four players 2

Referees: Marcos Benito (BRA), Natalia Cuello (DOM), Krishna Domínguez (MEX)

=== Final standings ===
Rank	Team	Record
1st place, gold medalist(s)	Colombia	4–1
2nd place, silver medalist(s)	Cuba	4–1
3rd place, bronze medalist(s)	Puerto Rico	4–1
4	Mexico	2–3
5	Virgin Islands	3–2
6	Jamaica	1–4
7	Guatemala	2–3
8	Barbados	0–5
