= Spain national basketball team head to head =

Results of the Spain national basketball team since 1935, as recognized by the Spanish Basketball Federation: Olympic Games, World Cups, EuroBaskets and the respective qualifying tournaments, as well as seven editions of the Mediterranean Games when the A-team was involved. Also included, friendly games and tournaments against national teams, including nine games of the unofficial 1966 "Extraordinary" World Championship, and five in the 1990 Goodwill Games.

Key
AF	FIBA Africa	OL	Summer Olympics	MR	Main Round	R16	Round of 16
AM	FIBA Americas	WC	World Cup / World Championship	PR	Preliminary Round	QF	Quarter-final
AS	FIBA Asia	EB	EuroBasket / European Championship	2R	Second Round	SF	Semifinal
EU	FIBA Europe	MG	Mediterranean Games	FR	Final Round	3P	Bronze Match
OC	FIBA Oceania	QL	Qualifying Tournament	CR	Classification Round	F	Final

Note: updated through 31 August 2026

Opponent	Z	Pld	W	L	%	PF	PA	PD	Details
France	EU	82	53	29	.646	6520	6117	+403	Extended content 73-78  2025 Friendly (Paris)   67-75  2025 Friendly (Badalona)   88-76  2022 EB F (Berlin)   87-79  2021 Friendly (Paris)   86-77  2021 Friendly (Málaga)   92-67  2016 OL QF (Rio)   80-75  2015 EB SF (Lille)  52-65  2014 WC QF (Madrid)  88-64  2014 WC PR (Granada)  72-75  2013 EB SF (Ljubljana)   85-84  2013 Friendly (Montpellier)   85-76  2013 Friendly (Madrid)   66-59  2012 OL QF (London)   75-70  2012 Friendly (Paris)   81-65  2012 Friendly (Madrid)   98-85  2011 EB F (Kaunas)   96-69  2011 EB FR (Vilnius)   76-53  2011 Friendly (Almería)   66-72  2010 WC PR (İzmir)   86-66  2009 EB QF (Katowice)   87-72  2007 Friendly (Alicante)   68-98  2005 EB 3P (Novi Sad)   94-88  2005 Friendly (Alicante)   95-84  2005 Friendly (Calpe)   98-91  2001 Friendly (Chiclana)   82-67  2000 Friendly (Perth)   58-82  2000 Friendly (Pau)   70-63  1999 EB SF (Paris)   57-74  1999 EB FR (Pau)   91-81  1999 Friendly (Torrelavega)   78-83  1998 Friendly (Antibes)   73-63  1998 Friendly (La Rinconada)   75-74  1995 EB CR (Athens)   75-86  1995 EB PR (Athens)   68-70  1994 Friendly (Córdoba)   95-83  1993 EB CR (Munich)   101-83 1991 EB 3P (Rome)    95-87  1989 EB CR (Zagreb)  114-109 1989 Friendly (Zaragoza)   108-96 1989 Friendly (Algeciras)   97-70  1988 OL-QL FR (Rotterdam)   111-70 1987 EB PR (Athens)   84-80  1986 WC PR (Zaragoza)   109-83 1985 EB PR (Karlsruhe)   97-82  1984 OL PR (Los Angeles)   117-102 1984 OL-QL FR (Paris)   75-73  1983 EB PR (Limoges)   102-93 1981 EB PR (Bratislava)  125-108 1981 Friendly (Agen)   109-106 1981 Friendly (Bordeaux)   103-100 1980 OL-QL FR (Geneva)   90-93  1980 Friendly (A Coruña)   92-72  1980 Friendly (Palma de Mallorca)   79-93  1979 EB-QL PR (Athens)   96-81  1977 Friendly (Barcelona)   108-72 1977 Friendly (Zaragoza)   85-80  1973 EB PR (Barcelona)   82-73  1973 Friendly (Grenoble)   90-78  1972 OL-QL PR (Amsterdam)   79-66  1971 EB PR (Essen)   91-70  1971 Friendly (Siena)   81-83  1969 Friendly (Madrid)   87-77  1968 Friendly (Madrid)   72-84  1967 MG MR (Tunisia)  74-81  1967 EB-QL FR (Monaco)   90-77  1965 EB PR (Tbilisi)   66-93  1964 OL-QL PR (Geneva)   86-70  1963 EB PR (Wrocław)   48-78  1960 OL PR (Rome)   53-55  1960 Friendly (Madrid)   59-61  1959 Friendly (Bordeaux)   50-59  1958 Friendly (Barcelona)   45-61  1957 Friendly (Paris)   61-64  1955 MG MR (Barcelona)   42-35  1954 Friendly (Madrid)   53-57  1953 Friendly (Paris)   55-68  1952 Friendly (Barcelona)   52-66  1951 Friendly (Paris)   46-31  1950 Friendly (Madrid)   40-43  1949 Friendly (Paris)   34-40  1948 Friendly (Madrid)   24-25  1943 Friendly (Toulouse)
Italy	EU	68	25	43	.368	5172	5354	-182	Extended content 63-67  2025 EB 1R (Limassol)     84-87  2024 Friendly (Madrid)   68-72  2023 WC QL (Cáceres)  88-84  2023 WC QL (Pesaro)  67-60  2019 WC 2R (Wuhan)  98-105 2015 EB PR (Berlin)  81-86  2013 EB PR (Ljubljana)   71-63  2004 OL PR (Athens)   81-79  2003 EB SF (Södertälje)   63-67  2000 Friendly (Perth)   56-64  1999 EB F (Paris)    64-61  1998 WC CR (Athens)   60-63  1997 EB PR (Badalona)   68-67  1997 Friendly (Alcoy)   84-68  1997 Friendly (Elda)   89-95  1996 Friendly (Roseto)   75-82  1995 EB CR (Athens)   75-70  1995 Friendly (Málaga)   84-82  1995 Friendly (Guadalajara)   76-72  1995 Friendly (Leganés)   78-60  1993 EB FR (Karlsruhe)   70-96  1992 Friendly (Trieste)   90-93  1991 EB SF (Rome)   85-102 1991 Friendly (Athens)   83-106 1990 WC CR (Salta)   96-105 1990 Friendly (Seattle)   76-97  1989 EB PR (Zagreb)   81-80  1989 EB-QL FR (Seville)   90-91  1988 OL-QL FR (Rotterdam)   75-87  1989 EB-QL FR (Trieste)   108-107 1987 Friendly (Reggio Calabria)   110-87 1987 Friendly (Toledo)   87-69  1986 WC CR (Madrid)   90-102 1985 EB 3P (Stuttgart)   93-98  1984 Friendly (Chieti)   96-105 1983 EB F (Nantes)     74-75  1983 EB PR (Limoges)   87-86  1981 EB FR (Prague)   80-93  1981 Friendly (Bergamo)   89-95  1980 OL FR (Moscow)   79-93  1980 OL-QL FR (Geneva)   100-101 1980 Friendly (A Coruña)   80-81  1979 EB FR (Turin)   73-78  1975 MG MR (Argel)   64-81  1975 Friendly (Ischia)   69-89  1975 EB FR (Belgrade)   77-65  1973 EB PR (Barcelona)   73-55  1973 Friendly (Grenoble)   67-66  1972 OL-QL PR (Amsterdam)   79-62  1971 Friendly (Siena)   71-66  1969 EB CR (Naples)   53-65  1969 EB PR (Naples)   62-66  1969 Friendly (Madrid)   88-72  1968 OL CR (Mexico City)   86-98  1968 OL PR (Mexico City)   77-87  1967 MG MR (Tunisia)   59-82  1966 Friendly (Paris)   82-87  1965 EB-QL MR (San Sebastián)   91-97  1963 MG MR (Naples)   45-65  1959 EB PR (Istanbul)   57-59  1959 Friendly (Naples)   59-57  1957 Friendly (Barcelona)   101-89 1955 MG MR (Barcelona)   73-76  1954 Friendly (Bologna)   51-57  1952 Friendly (Madrid)   52-47  1951 MG MR (Alexandria)   36-44  1950 WC-QL MR (Nice)   35-41  1950 WC-QL MR (Nice)
Soviet Union	EU	46	10	36	.217	3894	4478	-584	Extended content 91-89  1991 Friendly (Ourense)   86-85  1991 Friendly (Athens)   68-82  1990 Friendly (Las Palmas)   82-85  1990 Friendly (Zaragoza)   96-108 1989 EB PR (Zagreb)   95-109 1989 Friendly (Logroño)   82-129 1988 OL-QL FR (Rotterdam)   77-93  1988 Friendly (Puerto Real)   79-98  1988 Friendly (Palma de Mallorca)   96-113 1987 EB SF (Athens)   88-104 1987 EB PR (Athens)   93-85  1987 Friendly (Toledo)   83-88  1986 WC FR (Barcelona)   85-102 1986 Friendly (Valencia)  99-92  1985 EB FR (Karlsruhe)   107-128 1985 Friendly (León)   108-96 1985 Friendly (Toledo)   81-86  1984 Friendly (Chieti)   92-119 1984 OL-QL FR (Paris)  76-85  1984 Friendly (Puerto Real)   94-117 1984 Friendly (Linares)   95-94  1983 EB SF (Nantes)   78-88  1983 Friendly (Palma de Mallorca)   98-79  1983 Friendly (Santiago de Compostela)   93-106 1982 WC FR (Cali)   88-84  1982 Friendly (Burgos)   99-115 1982 Friendly (Palma de Mallorca)   101-110 1981 EB FR (Prague)   94-117 1980 OL 3P (Moscow)  102-119 1980 OL PR (Moscow)  82-93  1980 Friendly (Moscow)   72-98  1980 Friendly (Moscow)   83-100 1980 Friendly (A Coruña)   80-93  1980 Friendly (Palma de Mallorca)   89-90  1980 Friendly (Girona)   101-90 1979 EB PR (Siena)   87-92  1977 Friendly (Barcelona)   81-85  1977 Friendly (Zaragoza)   80-94  1975 EB FR (Belgrade)   71-100 1974 WC PR (San Juan, PR)   80-76  1973 EB SF (Barcelona)   58-118 1971 EB PR (Essen)   50-87  1966 Friendly (Valparaíso)   61-69  1966 Friendly (Curico)   64-106 1963 EB PR (Wrocław)   49-82  1961 EB PR (Belgrade)
Greece	EU	44	32	12	.727	3589	3338	+251	Extended content 86-90  2025 EB 1R (Limassol)   84-77  2024 OL PR (Lille)  87-80  2022 Friendly (Madrid)   70-86  2022 Friendly (Athens)     73-71  2015 EB QF (Lille)  75-79  2013 EB PR (Ljubljana)   80-72  2010 WC R16 (Istanbul)   82-64  2009 EB SF (Katowice)   81-66  2008 OL PR (Beijing)   82-77  2007 EB SF (Madrid)   76-58  2007 EB FR (Madrid)   70-47  2006 WC F (Saitama)   80-88  2005 Friendly (Madrid)   80-70  2004 Friendly (Madrid)   87-76  2001 Friendly (Chiclana)   94-91  2003 EB-QL FR (León)  73-86  2003 EB-QL FR (Athens)  84-79  2001 Friendly (Chiclana)   76-70  2000 Friendly (Valladolid)   60-65  1999 Friendly (Huelva)   62-69  1998 WC QF (Athens)   64-66  1995 EB QF (Athens)   75-76  1993 EB FR (Karlsruhe)   95-94  1992 Friendly (Trieste)   93-102 1990 WC PR (Villa Ballester)   91-84  1988 OL-QL FR (Rotterdam)   85-71  1987 MG MR (Aleppo)   106-89 1987 EB PR (Athens)   98-101 1987 Friendly (Reggio Calabria)   87-86  1986 WC PR (Zaragoza)   90-89  1984 OL-QL PR (Le Mans)   100-79 1983 EB PR (Limoges)   111-72 1981 EB PR (Bratislava)   89-88  1979 EB-QL MR (Thessaloniki)   80-74  1975 MG MR (Argel)   89-63  1975 EB PR (Rijeka)   86-74  1973 EB PR (Barcelona)   88-82  1972 OL-QL FR (Augsburg)   99-95  1967 EB CR (Helsinki)   82-89  1965 EB PR (Tbilisi)   73-46  1961 EB PR (Belgrade)  58-57  1955 MG MR (Barcelona)   59-53  1955 MG MR (Barcelona)   49-47  1951 MG MR (Alexandria)
Lithuania	EU	39	23	16	.590	3313	3125	+188	Extended content 102-94 2022 EB R16 (Berlin)   76-78  2022 Friendly (Vilnius)   77-82  2022 Friendly (Las Palmas)   78-70  2019 Friendly (Pamplona)   79-78  2017 Friendly (Vilnius)   109-59 2016 OL PR (Rio)   76-78  2016 Friendly (Málaga)   83-87  2016 Friendly (Kaunas)   80-63  2015 EB F (Lille)   91-79  2011 EB PR (Panevėžys)   76-88  2011 Friendly (Kaunas)   90-78  2011 Friendly (Madrid)   73-76  2010 WC PR (İzmir)  94-75  2010 Friendly (Madrid)   97-76  2010 Friendly (Vitoria-Gasteiz)   84-70  2009 EB FR (Łódź )   72-94  2009 Friendly (Vilnius)     100-74 2009 Friendly (Seville)     91-86  2008 OL SF (Beijing)   91-66  2008 Friendly (Ourense)   97-74  2007 Friendly (Ourense)   95-75  2007 Friendly (Gijón)   89-67  2006 WC QF (Saitama)   84-93  2003 EB F (Södertälje)    70-88  2003 Friendly (Torrevieja)   97-81  2003 Friendly (Salamanca)   89-91  2000 Friendly (Valladolid)   72-87  2000 Friendly (Granada)   74-72  1999 EB QF (Paris)   70-81  1999 Friendly (A Coruña)   87-84  1999 Friendly (Gijón)   86-80  1998 WC PR (Athens)  66-62  1998 Friendly (La Rinconada)   79-84  1998 Friendly (Valencia)   94-93  1997 EB CR (Barcelona)   89-73  1997 Friendly (Segovia)   82-99  1997 Friendly (Zaragoza)   97-107 1992 Friendly (Málaga)   77-83  1992 Friendly (Ibiza)
Germany	EU	36	28	8	.778	2887	2508	+379	Extended content 78-95  2025 Friendly (Cologne)    105-106 2025 Friendly (Madrid)    96-91  2022 EB SF (Berlin)   84-72  2017 EB QF (Istanbul)  77-76  2015 EB PR (Berlin)   85-54  2013 Friendly (A Coruña)    77-68  2011 EB FR (Vilnius)   72-59  2008 OL PR (Beijing)  83-55  2007 EB QF (Madrid)   72-56  2007 Friendly (Palma de Mallorca)    77-61  2007 Friendly (Valencia)    92-71  2006 WC PR (Hiroshima)   73-74  2005 EB SF (Novi Sad)   75-68  2005 Friendly (Valencia)    62-70  2002 WC QF (Indianapolis)   99-90  2001 EB 3P (Istanbul)    67-59  1997 EB PR (Badalona)   80-63  1994 Friendly (Toronto)    77-79  1993 EB QF (Munich)   74-83  1992 OL PR (Badalona)   78-79  1990 Friendly (Stuttgart)   75-64  1991 EB-QL FR (Palma de Mallorca) ↑ As  Germany   106-96 1988 OL-QL FR (Rotterdam)   107-77 1987 EB QF (Athens)   113-81 1986 Friendly (Huelva)   98-83  1985 EB QF (Stuttgart)   99-78  1984 OL-QL FR (Paris)  85-59  1980 OL-QL FR (Geneva)   103-88 1979 EB-QL PR (Athens)   84-83  1972 OL CR (Munich)   73-69  1971 EB PR (Essen)   86-58  1965 EB PR (Tbilisi)   62-49  1961 EB CR (Belgrade)   54-47  1955 Friendly (Berlin)   59-45  1954 Friendly (Madrid)  ↑ As  West Germany 1949–1989  0-2    1936 OL PR (Berlin)  ↑ As  Germany
Yugoslavia	EU	36	9	27	.250	2798	3073	-275	Extended content 67-76  1991 EB PR (Rome)   88-90  1990 Friendly (Athens)   95-82  1990 Friendly (Tuzla)   67-81  1990 Friendly (Seattle)   82-85  1990 Friendly (A Coruña)   85-82  1990 Friendly (Algeciras)   97-108 1991 EB-QL FR (Palma de Mallorca)  73-84  1988 OL-QL FR (Rotterdam)   87-98  1987 EB 3P (Athens)   76-94  1987 EB PR (Athens)   83-99  1985 EB PR (Karlsruhe)   74-61  1984 OL SF (Los Angeles)   100-76 1984 Friendly (Chieti)   91-90  1983 EB PR (Limoges)   117-119 1982 WC 3P (Cali)   91-108 1982 WC FR (Cali)   90-88  1982 Friendly (Palma de Mallorca)   72-95  1981 EB FR (Prague)   91-95  1980 OL PR (Moscow)   100-108 1979 EB FR (Turin)   76-79  1977 EB PR (Ostend)   71-96  1976 OL-QL FR (Hamilton)   66-78  1975 MG MR (Argel)   76-98  1975 EB FR (Belgrade)   71-79  1974 WC FR (San Juan, PR)   67-78  1973 EB F (Barcelona)    59-65  1973 EB PR (Barcelona)   91-84  1972 Friendly (Barcelona)   79-92  1968 OL PR (Mexico City)   73-101 1967 EB PR (Helsinki)   68-82  1967 EB PR (Helsinki)   65-68  1966 Friendly (Santiago de Chile)   65-113 1965 EB PR (Tbilisi)   83-72  1963 MG MR (Naples)   60-69  1959 MG MR (Beirut)   2-0    1950 WC CR (Buenos Aires)
Poland	EU	34	21	13	.618	2878	2570	+308	Extended content 89-88  2021 EB-QL FR (Gliwice)  69-80  2021 EB-QL FR (Zaragoza)  90-78  2019 WC QF (Shanghai)  80-66  2015 EB R16 (Lille)  71-64  2015 Friendly (Santander)   89-53  2013 EB PR (Celje)   70-66  2013 Friendly (Castellón)   83-78  2011 EB PR (Panevėžys)   90-68  2009 EB FR (Łódź )   88-83  2009 Friendly (Zaragoza)   89-57  2006 Friendly (Madrid)   91-56  2003 Friendly (El Ejido)   104-61 1997 EB PR (Badalona)   73-67  1991 EB PR (Rome)   128-71 1989 Friendly (Zaragoza)   99-97  1985 EB PR (Karlsruhe)   98-83  1984 Friendly (Puerto Real)   100-71 1984 Friendly (Linares)   104-81 1980 OL PR (Moscow)   107-81 1980 OL-QL PR (Lucerne)   93-81  1979 EB-QL PR (Athens)   99-73  1976 OL-QL FR (Hamilton)   76-87  1972 OL CR (Munich)   78-82  1972 OL-QL FR (Augsburg)   86-88  1972 OL-QL PR (Groningen)   70-83  1971 EB PR (Essen)   78-79  1969 EB PR (Naples)   82-83  1968 OL-QL MR (Monterrey)   71-88  1967 EB PR (Helsinki)   79-80  1966 Friendly (Paris)   57-82  1965 EB PR (Tbilisi)   76-79  1963 EB PR (Wrocław)   63-75  1960 OL PR (Rome)   58-61  1959 EB PR (Istanbul)
United States	AM	33	4	29	.121	2510	3060	-550	Extended content 88-98   2023 Friendly (Málaga)   81-95   2020 OL QF (Saitama)   76-83   2021 Friendly (Las Vegas)   81-90   2019 Friendly (Anaheim)   76-82   2016 OL SF (Rio)   100-107 2012 OL F (London)    78-100  2012 Friendly (Barcelona)   85-86   2010 Friendly (Madrid)   107-118 2008 OL F (Beijing)    82-119  2008 OL PR (Beijing)   94-102  2004 OL QF (Athens)   81-75   2002 WC CR (Indianapolis)   66-95   2000 Friendly (Tokyo)   73-75   1998 WC PR (Athens)   78-95   1998 Friendly (Monaco)   100-115 1994 WC PR (Hamilton)   85-83   1993 Friendly (Castellón)   81-122  1992 OL PR (Badalona)   85-95   1990 WC PR (Villa Ballester)   53-97   1988 OL PR (Seoul)   65-96   1984 OL F (Los Angeles)    68-101  1984 OL PR (Los Angeles)   109-99  1982 WC PR (Bogotá)   71-114  1974 WC PR (Caguas, PR)   56-72   1972 OL PR (Munich)   97-80   1972 Friendly (Buenos Aires)   82-100  1972 Friendly (São Paulo)   46-81   1968 OL PR (Mexico City)   71-90   1966 Friendly (Valparaíso)   63-112  1962 Friendly (Taipei)   73-90   1962 Friendly (Manila)   59-91   1960 Friendly (Lugano)   0-2     1936 OL PR (Berlin)
Belgium	EU	32	21	11	.656	2184	2072	+112	Extended content 59-52  2025 EB-QL FR (León)  53-58  2025 EB-QL FR (Charleroi)  73-83  2022 EB PR (Tbilisi)   88-72  2017 Friendly (Brussels)   71-89  2017 Friendly (S.C. La Laguna)   67-64  2015 Friendly (Gijón)   85-66  2003 EB-QL FR (Murcia)   78-63  2003 EB-QL FR (Liège)   94-93  1977 EB PR (Ostend)  82-76  1971 EB-QL MR (Brussels)   78-64  1969 EB-QL MR (Mataró)   89-76  1967 EB PR (Helsinki)   86-88  1965 Friendly (Amsterdam)   85-94  1964 OL-QL CR (Geneva)   82-78  1964 OL-QL PR (Geneva)   86-83  1963 EB CR (Wrocław)   79-78  1962 Friendly (Brussels)   67-71  1962 Friendly (Courtrai)   67-70  1961 EB PR (Belgrade)   63-56  1961 Friendly (Madrid)   54-46  1961 Friendly (Barcelona)   81-71  1960 OL-QL PR (Bologna)   56-69  1959 Friendly (Brussels)   64-48  1958 Friendly (Barcelona)   57-47  1957 Friendly (Brussels)   87-62  1956 Friendly (Barcelona)   43-54  1955 Friendly (Liège)   48-50  1953 Friendly (Bilbao)   50-54  1952 Friendly (Brussels)   42-36  1951 Friendly (Madrid)   45-44  1950 WC-QL MR (Nice)   25-17  1935 EB 1R (Geneva)
Argentina	AM	30	27	3	.900	2515	2219	+296	Extended content 76-72  2024 Friendly (Guadalajara)   81-71  2020 OL PR (Saitama)  95-75  2019 WC F (Beijing)   84-76  2019 Friendly (Ningbo)   92-73  2016 OL PR (Rio)   86-53  2014 Friendly (Madrid)   105-85 2012 Friendly (Coruña)   81-86  2010 WC CR (Istanbul)   83-76  2010 Friendly (Logroño)   87-62  2008 Friendly (Ourense)   90-88  2008 Friendly (Madrid)   75-74  2006 WC SF (Saitama)   87-66  2006 Friendly (Singapore)   79-67  2006 Friendly (Madrid)   87-76  2004 OL PR (Athens)   98-90  2004 Friendly (Madrid)   77-64  1998 WC CR (Athens)   68-67  1998 WC FR (Athens)   65-74  1994 WC CR (Hamilton)   72-70  1994 WC CR (Hamilton)   91-84  1994 Friendly (Córdoba)   75-82  1992 Friendly (San Juan, PR)   96-89  1974 WC PR (San Juan, PR)   109-89 1974 Friendly (Cáceres)   99-75  1974 Friendly (Cuenca, Spain   78-76  1972 Friendly (Buenos Aires)   68-58  1972 Friendly (São Paulo)   81-70  1966 Friendly (Curico)   76-69  1962 Friendly (Madrid)   74-62  1962 Friendly (Barcelona)
Israel	EU	29	24	5	.828	2452	2145	+307	Extended content 78-73  2021 EB-QL FR (Gliwice)  87-95  2021 EB-QL FR (Valencia)  76-56  2017 Friendly (Estepona)   90-70  2017 Friendly (Benahavís)   93-56  2009 Friendly (Murcia)   102-79 2009 Friendly (Zaragoza)   99-73  2007 EB FR (Madrid)   77-85  2005 EB PR (Novi Sad)   78-64  2003 EB QF (Södertälje)   79-71  2003 EB-QL FR (Tel Aviv)   88-74  2003 EB-QL FR (Madrid)   71-67  2001 EB PR (Ankara)   81-72  2001 Friendly (Chiclana)   88-74  1999 EB FR (Pau)   71-63  1999 EB-QL FR (Torrejón de Ardoz)   67-61  1999 EB-QL FR (Tel Aviv)   82-72  1997 Friendly (Melilla)   79-71  1995 Friendly (A Coruña)   78-83  1995 EB-QL FR (Huesca)   79-69  1995 EB-QL FR (Tel Aviv)   94-65  1986 WC FR (Barcelona)   120-97 1984 OL-QL FR (Paris)   76-77  1984 Friendly (Puerto Real)   89-81  1981 EB PR (Bratislava)   100-89 1980 OL-QL FR (Geneva)   84-88  1979 EB FR (Turin)   86-80  1979 Friendly (Tel Aviv)   70-59  1971 EB-QL FR (Tel Aviv)   90-81  1969 EB PR (Naples)
Canada	AM	27	14	13	.519	2259	2124	+135	Extended content 85-88  2024 OL PR (Lille)  85-88  2023 WC 2R (Jakarta)  80-85  2023 Friendly (Granada)   82-70  2014 Friendly (A Coruña)   89-67  2010 WC PR (İzmir)   84-38  2010 Friendly (Las Palmas)   85-54  2002 WC PR (Salta)   77-91  2000 OL PR (Sydney)   81-92  1994 Friendly (Hamilton)   88-102 1994 Friendly (Castellón)   93-79  1994 Friendly (Lliria)   84-75  1990 WC CR (Salta)   91-96  1988 OL CR (Seoul)   94-84  1988 OL PR (Seoul)   100-80 1986 WC CR (Madrid)   83-82  1984 OL PR (Los Angeles)   83-80  1982 WC FR (Cali)   85-87  1976 Friendly (Montreal)   64-92  1976 Friendly (Montreal)   103-80 1976 Friendly (Alcalá de Henares)   88-66  1975 Friendly (Lugo)   94-102 1975 Friendly (Bilbao)   73-86  1974 WC FR (San Juan, PR)   77-82  1973 Friendly (Pineda de Mar)   94-68  1972 OL-QL FR (Augsburg)   57-61  1962 Friendly (Manila)   60-49  1960 OL-QL FR (Bologna)
Brazil	AM	25	15	10	.600	2181	2048	+133	Extended content 96-78  2023 WC 1R (Jakarta)  65-66  2016 OL PR (Rio)   82-63  2014 WC PR (Granada)   82-88  2012 OL PR (London)   84-68  2010 Friendly (Logroño)   92-57  2004 Friendly (Alicante)   105-89 2002 WC CR (Indianapolis)   84-67  2002 WC PR (Indianapolis)   73-63  2004 OL PR (Athens)   90-85  1994 WC CR (Hamilton)   73-67  1994 WC PR (Hamilton)   101-100 1992 OL PR (Badalona)   89-114 1990 Friendly (Seattle)   118-100 1988 OL PR (Seoul)   91-102 1988 Friendly (Beijing)   72-86  1986 WC PR (Zaragoza)   110-81 1980 OL PR (Moscow)   100-109 1976 OL-QL FR (Hamilton)   93-91  1974 WC FR (San Juan, PR)   69-72  1972 OL PR (Munich)   86-89  1972 Friendly (Buenos Aires)   80-85  1972 Friendly (São Paulo)   88-87  1972 Friendly (Barcelona)   92-73  1970 Friendly (Madrid)   66-68  1966 Friendly (Santiago de Chile)
Croatia	EU	25	13	12	.520	2054	1931	+123	Extended content 79-73  2017 EB PR (Cluj-Napoca)   70-72  2016 OL PR (Rio)   82-64  2014 Friendly (Badalona)   92-66  2013 EB 3P (Ljubljana)   68-40  2013 EB PR (Celje)   72-59  2008 OL QF (Beijing)   84-85  2007 EB PR (Seville)   101-85 2005 EB QF (Novi Sad)   89-82  2005 Friendly (Granada)   98-99  2005 Friendly (Córdoba)   97-70  2004 Friendly (Palma de Mallorca)   76-63  2002 Friendly (Torrelavega)   73-75  2001 Friendly (Friendly)   104-80 2000 Friendly (Huelva)   76-80  1999 Friendly (Huelva)   78-71  1997 EB PR (Badalona)   66-72  1996 Friendly (Estella-Lizarra)   91-80  1996 Friendly (León)   70-80  1995 EB PR (Athens)   68-78  1995 Friendly (A Coruña)   91-81  1994 Friendly (Fuenlabrada)   79-88  1992 OL CR (Badalona)   82-88  1992 Friendly (Seville)   72-91  1992 Friendly (Palma de Mallorca)   96-109 1992 Friendly (Trieste)
Turkey	EU	24	17	7	.708	1795	1581	+214	Extended content 72-69  2022 EB PR (Tbilisi)   74-58  2019 WC QL (S.C. La Laguna)  67-71  2019 WC QL (Ankara)  73-56  2017 EB R16 (Istanbul)  104-77 2015 EB PR (Berlin)  70-63  2014 Friendly (Istanbul)   77-55  2014 Friendly (Granada)   57-65  2011 EB PR (Panevėžys)   60-63  2009 EB FR (Łódź )   87-64  2002 WC PR (Indianapolis)   79-84  2001 EB PR (Ankara)   66-65  2000 Friendly (Huelva)   86-81  1997 EB CR (Barcelona)   90-69  1996 Friendly (Roseto)   85-70  1995 EB PR (Athens)   89-85  1995 EB-QL FR (Istanbul)   74-65  1995 EB-QL FR (Málaga)   72-50  1993 Friendly (Córdoba)   62-63  1987 MG MR (Aleppo)   111-74 1984 OL-QL PR (Le Mans)   89-101 1967 MG MR (Tunisia)   53-41  1959 MG MR (Beirut)   50-53  1959 EB PR (Istanbul)   48-39  1951 MG MR (Alexandria)
Great Britain	EU	23	23	0	1.000	2079	1546	+533	Extended content 100-46 2013 Friendly (Zaragoza)   80-67  2013 Friendly (Murcia)   79-78  2012 OL PR (London)   78-74  2012 Friendly (Valladolid)   86-69  2011 EB PR (Panevėžys)   84-76  2009 EB PR (Warsaw)   84-63  2009 Friendly (Seville)   74-58  1999 EB-QL FR (León) †  92-67  1999 EB-QL FR (Plymouth) †  91-70  1995 Friendly (Huesca) †  94-81  1992 Friendly (Ibiza) †  96-79  1990 Friendly (Murcia) †  99-83  1991 EB-QL FR (Birmingham) †  94-58  1988 Friendly (Beijing) †  98-64  1988 OL-QL PR (Groningen)   102-91 1984 OL-QL FR (Paris)   78-47  1981 EB PR (Bratislava) †  125-63 1980 OL-QL PR (Lucerne)   98-79  1976 OL-QL PR (Hamilton)   96-63  1972 OL-QL PR (Groningen)   97-67  1964 OL-QL PR (Geneva)   99-50  1961 EB CR (Belgrade) †  55-53  1956 Friendly (London) †  † As  England
Czechoslovakia	EU	22	10	12	.455	1761	1756	+5	Extended content 113-89 1991 Friendly (Ourense)   84-77  1990 Friendly (Algeciras)   96-84  1988 Friendly (Puerto Real)   92-72  1988 Friendly (Palma de Mallorca)   121-80 1986 Friendly (Alcázar de San Juan)   95-98  1985 EB SF (Stuttgart)   87-74  1985 Friendly (León)   90-101 1981 EB 3P (Prague)   72-69  1981 EB PR (Bratislava)   68-70  1980 OL-QL FR (Geneva)   100-107 1979 EB FR (Turin)   70-73  1977 EB PR (Ostend)   71-96  1976 OL-QL FR (Hamilton)   87-67  1975 EB FR (Belgrade)   70-74  1972 OL PR (Munich)   87-88  1972 OL-QL PR (Amsterdam)   60-97  1969 EB PR (Naples)   65-98  1967 EB PR (Helsinki)   98-76  1963 EB PR (Wrocław)   52-64  1960 OL-QL PR (Bologna)   62-85  1959 EB PR (Istanbul)   21-17  1935 EB SF (Geneva)
Australia	AS	20	16	4	.800	1676	1523	+153	Extended content 80-92  2024 OL PR (Lille)  95-88  2019 WC SF (Beijing)  ↑ Since 2017, as member of FIBA Asia  89-88  2016 OL 3P (Rio)    82-70  2012 OL PR (London)   81-75  2012 Friendly (Málaga)   75-69  2012 Friendly (Granada)   97-58  2011 Friendly (Valencia)   68-51  2011 Friendly (Murcia)   83-89  2002 Friendly (Torrelavega)   91-71  2002 Friendly (Estepona)   80-91  2000 OL PR (Sydney)   77-76  1998 WC PR (Athens)   78-71  1990 Friendly (Seattle)   74-77  1988 OL QF (Seoul)   101-93 1984 OL QF (Los Angeles)   99-87  1982 WC FR (Cali)   79-74  1972 OL PR (Munich)   76-66  1970 Friendly (Madrid)   85-66  1968 OL-QL MR (Monterrey)   86-71  1962 Friendly (Manila)  ↑ As member of FIBA Oceania
Bulgaria	EU	20	15	5	.750	1580	1461	+119	Extended content 114-87 2022 EB PR (Tbilisi)   96-59  2011 Friendly (Guadalajara)   74-68  1992 Friendly (Palma de Mallorca)   94-93  1991 EB PR (Rome)   108-85 1989 EB CR (Zagreb)  85-81  1979 EB PR (Siena)   115-79 1976 OL-QL FR (Hamilton)  85-74  1975 EB PR (Rijeka)   85-69  1973 EB PR (Barcelona)   67-64  1972 OL-QL FR (Augsburg)   108-84 1972 OL-QL PR (Amsterdam)   84-95  1971 EB CR (Essen)   78-75  1969 EB CR (Caserta)   72-68  1969 EB-QL MR (Mataró)   72-75  1966 Friendly (Santiago de Chile)   56-79  1965 EB PR (Tbilisi)   76-73  1964 OL-QL PR (Geneva)   70-102 1963 EB CR (Wrocław)   2-0    1968 OL PR (Rome)   39-51  1958 Friendly (Barcelona)
Netherlands	EU	19	18	1	.947	1704	1449	+255	Extended content 84-72  2023 WC QL (Huelva)  86-64  2023 WC QL (Almere)  78-76  1989 EB PR (Zagreb)   94-68  1988 OL-QL PR (Groningen)   115-76 1986 Friendly (Valencia)   87-81  1980 Friendly (Palma de Mallorca)   105-83 1979 EB PR (Siena)   95-114 1977 EB PR (Ostend)   97-86  1976 OL-QL FR (Hamilton)   102-79 1972 OL-QL PR (Amsterdam)   103-75 1971 EB-QL MR (Tel Aviv)   79-71  1967 EB PR (Helsinki)   93-92  1965 Friendly (Amsterdam)   85-77  1965 EB-QL MR (San Sebastián)   85-80  1964 OL-QL PR (Geneva)   75-64  1962 Friendly (Amsterdam)   88-78  1962 Friendly (Rotterdam)   67-62  1959 Friendly (Amsterdam)   86-51  1955 Friendly (Amsterdam)
Finland	EU	19	17	2	.895	1576	1338	+238	Extended content 81-74  2024 OL-QL FR (Valencia)  100-90 2022 EB QF (Berlin)   82-56  2013 EB PR (Ljubljana)   87-74  1995 EB PR (Athens)   94-75  1994 Friendly (Lliria)   107-92 1980 OL-QL PR (Lucerne)   99-85  1979 EB-QL MR (Thessaloniki)   83-79  1979 Friendly (Jordan Valley, ISR)   106-89 1977 EB CR (Liège)   85-78  1977 EB PR (Ostend)   90-71  1972 OL-QL FR (Augsburg)   69-76  1967 EB PR (Helsinki)   79-76  1965 Friendly (Amsterdam)   65-58  1965 EB CR (Moscow)   79-83  1963 EB PR (Wrocław)  61-60  1961 EB CR (Belgrade)  99-53  1961 EB PR (Belgrade)  57-43  1959 EB PR (Istanbul)   53-26  1950 WC-QL MR (Nice)
Slovenia	EU	19	15	4	.789	1616	1451	+165	Extended content 99-79  2023 Friendly (Málaga)   87-95  2020 OL PR (Saitama)  83-72  2019 WC QL (Ljubljana)   92-84  2019 WC QL (Burgos)   72-92  2017 EB SF (Istanbul)     69-78  2013 EB PR (Celje)   86-64  2011 EB QF (Kaunas)   79-57  2011 Friendly (Granada)   73-61  2011 Friendly (Málaga)   97-80  2010 WC CR (Istanbul)   79-72  2010 Friendly (Ljubljana)   88-68  2010 Friendly (Vitoria-Gasteiz)   90-84  2009 EB PR (Warsaw)   89-71  2009 Friendly (Seville)   96-85  2006 Friendly (Singapore)   85-61  2001 EB PR (Ankara)   75-85  1999 EB PR (Clermont-Ferrand)   88-85  1995 EB PR (Athens)   89-78  1992 Friendly (León)
Romania	EU	18	15	3	.833	1595	1314	+281	Extended content 94-41  2021 EB-QL FR (Valencia)  84-71  2021 EB-QL FR (Cluj-Napoca)  91-50  2017 EB PR (Cluj-Napoca)   96-70  2003 EB-QL FR (Cluj-Napoca)   90-52  2003 EB-QL FR (Madrid)   116-98 1987 EB PR (Athens)   106-94 1985 EB PR (Karlsruhe)   85-83  1979 EB-QL PR (Athens)   96-66  1975 EB PR (Rijeka)   82-81  1972 Friendly (Vitoria-Gasteiz)   82-77  1972 Friendly (Bilbao)   86-71  1971 EB CR (Essen)   72-76  1971 EB PR (Essen)   84-94  1971 EB-QL MR (Tel Aviv)   78-63  1969 EB PR (Naples)   93-69  1968 Friendly (Madrid)   85-88  1967 EB PR (Helsinki)   75-70  1963 EB PR (Wrocław)
Russia	EU	18	11	7	.611	1347	1274	+73	Extended content 55-74  2019 Friendly (Ningbo)   93-85  2017 EB 3P (Istanbul)   67-59  2012 OL SF (London)   74-77  2012 OL PR (London)   91-56  2008 Friendly (Cáceres)   59-60  2007 EB F (Madrid)   81-69  2007 EB FR (Madrid)   89-77  2003 EB PR (Södertälje)   78-61  2002 Friendly (Estepona)   87-80  2002 Friendly (Málaga)   62-55  2001 EB QF (Istanbul)   56-73  2001 Friendly (Chiclana)   63-71  2000 OL PR (Sydney)   72-69  1999 EB PR (Clermont-Ferrand)   67-70  1997 EB QF (Barcelona)   73-85  1997 Friendly (Melilla)   94-78  1995 EB PR (Athens)   86-75  1993 EB FR (Karlsruhe)
Ukraine	EU	16	13	3	.813	1308	1080	+228	Extended content 78-64  2027 WC QL (Oviedo)  86-66  2027 WC QL (Riga)   77-76  2023 WC QL (Riga)   88-74  2023 WC QL (Córdoba)   72-68  2019 WC QL (S.C. La Laguna)  65-76  2019 WC QL (Kyiv)  71-63  2014 Friendly (Badalona)   82-49  2005 Friendly (Castellón)   95-56  2003 Friendly (Torrevieja)   80-51  1999 EB-QL FR (León)   80-60  1998 Friendly (San Fernando)   83-66  1999 EB-QL FR (Kyiv)   82-54  1997 EB PR (Badalona)   83-61  1993 Friendly (Melilla)   83-87  1993 Friendly (Córdoba)   103-109 1992 Friendly (León)
Puerto Rico	AM	16	9	7	.563	1294	1179	+115	Extended content 107-84 2024 Friendly (Madrid)   73-63  2019 WC PR (Guangzhou)  113-62 2004 Friendly (Alicante)   65-73  2002 WC FR (Indianapolis)   69-64  1992 Friendly (Granada)   86-99  1992 Friendly (Almería)   74-75  1990 Friendly (Seattle)   91-90  1989 Friendly (Logroño)   92-93  1988 OL CR (Seoul)   102-86 1974 WC PR (San Juan, PR)   86-62  1968 OL PR (Mexico City)   63-64  1968 Friendly (San Juan, PR)   76-52  1966 Friendly (Curico)  76-72  1962 Friendly (Taipei)   56-65  1962 Friendly (Manila)   65-75  1960 OL CR (Rome)
China	AS	15	14	1	.933	1453	1082	+371	Extended content 97-81  2012 OL PR (London)   85-75  2008 OL PR (Beijing)   97-63  2006 Friendly (Castellón)   96-49  2006 Friendly (Córdoba)   92-76  2004 OL CR (Athens)   83-58  2004 OL PR (Athens)   86-64  2000 OL CR (Sydney)   76-78  1994 WC PR (Hamilton)   130-86 1990 WC CR (Salta)   106-74 1988 OL PR (Seoul)   120-103 1988 Friendly (Beijing)   102-83 1984 OL PR (Los Angeles)   108-78 1982 WC PR (Bogotá)   95-64  1973 Friendly (Valls)   80-50  1973 Friendly (Barcelona)
Portugal	EU	15	13	2	.867	1057	742	+315	Extended content 89-95  2027 WC QL  74-76  2025 Friendly (Málaga)   87-73  2011 EB PR (Panevėžys)   84-35  2008 Friendly (Badajoz)   82-56  2007 EB PR (Seville)  82-65  2007 Friendly (Logroño)   89-54  1963 EB-QL FR (Madrid)   68-34  1959 Friendly (Madrid)   46-38  1958 Friendly (Porto)   101-58 1957 Friendly (Madrid)   70-55  1956 Friendly (Lisbon)  63-36  1949 Friendly (Tétouan)   52-27  1948 Friendly (Lisbon)   37-28  1947 Friendly (Madrid)   33-12  1935 EB-QL F (Madrid)
Cuba	AM	15	11	4	.733	1334	1231	+103	Extended content 94-57  2009 Friendly (Las Palmas)   103-90 1989 Friendly (Logroño)    104-82 1987 Friendly (Seville)   78-77  1986 WC FR (Barcelona)   102-97 1982 Friendly (Burgos)   97-93  1982 Friendly (Palma de Mallorca)   96-95  1980 OL FR (Moscow)   97-85  1979 Friendly (Ferrol)   85-98  1979 Friendly (Móstoles)   93-87  1977 Friendly (Zaragoza)   100-94 1976 Friendly (Madrid)   75-84  1974 WC FR (San Juan, PR)   64-65  1974 Friendly (Havana)    53-74  1972 OL PR (Munich)   93-53  1969 Friendly (Badalona)
Serbia and Montenegro	EU	14	7	7	.500	1019	1061	-42	Extended content 89-70  2005 EB PR (Novi Sad)   76-68  2004 OL PR (Athens)   76-60  2004 Friendly (Granada)   83-78  2004 Friendly (Palma de Mallorca)   75-67  2003 EB PR (Södertälje)  ↑ As  Serbia and Montenegro 2003–2006   71-69  2002 WC PR (Indianapolis)   65-78  2001 EB SF (Istanbul)   65-78  2000 OL PR (Sydney)   63-77  1999 EB FR (Pau)   79-81  1998 Friendly (San Fernando)   68-66  1998 Friendly (San Fernando)   70-79  1997 EB FR (Badalona)   71-103 1996 Friendly (Belgrade)   68-87  1995 Friendly (Fuenlabrada)   ↑ As  FR Yugoslavia 1995–2002
Switzerland	EU	13	13	0	1.000	1146	671	+475	Extended content 130-53 1989 EB-QL FR (Geneva  132-59 1989 EB-QL FR (Palma de Mallorca)  111-78 1984 OL-QL PR (Le Mans)   93-52  1969 EB-QL MR (Mataró)   88-39  1967 EB-QL FR (Monaco)   88-51  1965 EB-QL MR (San Sebastián)   93-56  1964 Friendly (Badalona)   98-56  1964 Friendly (Girona)   69-42  1958 Friendly (Huesca)   52-39  1957 Friendly (Geneva)   60-48  1955 Friendly (Lausanne)   86-72  1953 Friendly (Lleida)   46-26  1952 Friendly (Geneva)
Sweden	EU	12	11	1	.917	1046	873	+173	Extended content 99-52  2003 EB PR (Södertälje)   72-49  1993 EB PR (Karlsruhe)   103-97 1988 OL-QL PR (Groningen)   97-76  1984 OL-QL FR (Paris)   81-76  1983 EB PR (Limoges)   86-87  1980 OL-QL FR (Geneva)   79-74  1979 EB-QL MR (Thessaloniki)   91-78  1976 OL-QL FR (Hamilton)   77-67  1972 OL-QL FR (Augsburg)   93-77  1972 OL-QL PR (Amsterdam)   90-66  1971 EB-QL MR (Tel Aviv)   78-74  1965 EB PR (Tbilisi)
Latvia	EU	12	8	4	.667	984	884	+100	Extended content 66-83  2025 EB-QL FR (Riga)  75-79  2025 EB-QL FR (Zaragoza)  69-74  2023 WC 2R (Jakarta)  67-62  2019 WC QL (Riga)    85-82  2019 WC QL (Madrid)  107-57 2003 Friendly (Castellón)   93-77  2007 EB PR (Seville)   114-109 2005 EB PR (Novi Sad)   89-73  2003 Friendly (El Ejido)   106-77 2001 EB PR (Ankara)   95-87  1993 EB FR (Karlsruhe)   18-24  1935 EB F (Geneva)
Angola	AF	11	10	1	.909	912	729	+183	Extended content 89-81  2024 OL-QL FR (Valencia)  85-61  2016 Friendly (Burgos)   79-70  2014 Friendly (Seville)   98-50  2008 OL PR (Beijing)   93-83  2006 WC PR (Hiroshima)   97-73  2006 Friendly (Valencia)   88-55  2002 WC PR (Indianapolis)   64-45  2000 OL PR (Sydney)   78-53  1996 Friendly (León)   78-75  1992 OL CR (Badalona)   63-83  1992 OL PR (Badalona)
Egypt	AF	11	9	2	.750	870	625	+245	Extended content 91-54  2014 WC PR (Granada)   94-52  1994 WC CR (Hamilton)   107-73 1990 WC CR (Salta)   113-70 1988 OL PR (Seoul)   72-58  1972 OL PR (Munich)   91-42  1969 EB-QL MR (Mataró) †  92-75  1963 MG MR (Naples) †  54-48  1959 MG MR (Beirut) †  61-55  1955 MG MR (Barcelona)   39-41  1951 MG MR (Alexandria)   56-57  1950 WC PR (Buenos Aires)   † As  United Arab Republic
Serbia	EU	11	8	3	.727	892	764	+128	Extended content 81-69  2019 WC 2R (Wuhan)  70-80  2015 EB PR (Berlin)   89-73  2014 WC PR (Granada)  90-60  2013 EB QF (Ljubljana)   81-59  2011 EB FR (Vilnius)   89-92  2010 WC QF (Istanbul)   85-63  2009 EB F (Katowice)   57-66  2009 EB PR (Warsaw)   87-75  2006 WC R16 (Saitama)   80-65  2006 Friendly (Singapore)   83-62  2006 Friendly (Alicante)
Venezuela	AM	10	10	0	1.000	926	690	+236	Extended content 87-57  2023 Friendly (Madrid)   90-62  2017 Friendly (Málaga)   90-44  2017 Friendly (Madrid)   91-55  2016 Friendly (Valladolid)   80-65  2016 Friendly (Madrid)   82-80  2015 Friendly (Burgos)   93-69  2007 Friendly (Jerez de la Frontera)   95-81  1992 OL CR (Badalona)   122-102 1990 WC CR (Salta)   96-75  1990 Friendly (A Coruña)
Panama	AM	9	9	0	1.000	892	662	+230	Extended content 101-57 2006 WC PR (Hiroshima)   125-70 1986 WC PR (Zaragoza)   114-84 1983 Friendly (Santiago Comp.)   88-85  1982 WC PR (Bogotá)   114-64 1974 Friendly (Havana)   81-62  1974 Friendly (Panama City)   87-78  1974 Friendly (Panama City)   94-80  1974 Friendly (Panama City)   88-82  1968 OL PR (Mexico City)
Hungary	EU	8	8	0	1.000	779	523	+256	Extended content 87-64  2017 EB PR (Cluj-Napoca)   103-45 2008 Friendly (Zaragoza)   84-75  1999 EB PR (Clermont-Ferrand)   90-75  1999 Friendly (Gijón)   100-84 1989 EB-QL FR (Zalaegerszeg)    122-63 1989 EB-QL FR (Seville)   97-50  1980 OL-QL PR (Lucerne)   96-67  1972 OL-QL PR (Groningen)
Czech Republic	EU	7	7	0	1.000	500	363	+137	Extended content 87-73  2025 Friendly (Málaga)   93-56  2017 EB PR (Cluj-Napoca)   81-68  2015 Friendly (Zaragoza)   60-39  2013 EB PR (Celje)  79-55  2007 Friendly (Castellón)   80-78  1995 EB-QL FR (Nový Jičín)   107-67 1995 EB-QL FR (Málaga)
Iran	AS	7	7	0	1.000	623	449	+174	Extended content 85-65 2023 WC 1R (Jakarta)  96-53 2021 Friendly (Madrid)   88-61 2021 Friendly (Valencia)   73-65  2019 WC PR (Guangzhou)  90-60  2014 WC PR (Granada)   120-103 1988 Friendly (Beijing)   71-42  1959 EB CR (Istanbul)
Tunisia	AF	7	7	0	1.000	642	385	+257	Extended content 101-62 2019 WC PR (Guangzhou)  71-45  2017 Friendly (S.C. La Laguna)   95-56  2012 Friendly (Salamanca)   101-72 1987 MG MR (Aleppo)   100-65 1975 MG MR (Argel)   82-54  1967 MG MR (Tunisia)   92-31  1959 MG MR (Beirut)
Lebanon	AS	7	6	1	.857	644	416	+228	Extended content 104-59  2024 OL-QL FR (Valencia)  91-57  2010 WC PR (İzmir)   142-62 1987 MG MR (Alexandria)   104-68 1963 MG MR (Naples)   69-72  1959 MG MR (Beirut)   76-64  1955 MG MR (Barcelona)   58-34  1951 MG MR (Alexandria)
Georgia	EU	7	4	3	.571	586	501	+85	Extended content 89-91  2027 WC QL (Tbilisi)   90-61  2027 WC QL (La Laguna)  69-83  2025 EB 1R (Limassol)   90-64  2022 EB PR (Tbilisi)   76-82  2023 WC QL (Tbilisi)   89-61  2023 WC QL (Jaén)   83-59  2013 EB PR (Celje)
Mexico	AM	7	3	4	.429	565	530	+35	Extended content 110-68 1992 Friendly (Leon)   72-73  1976 OL-QL FR (Hamilton)   75-69  1972 OL-QL FR (Augsburg)   80-81  1972 Friendly (São Paulo)   72-73  1968 OL CR (Mexico City)   88-86  1968 Friendly (Madrid)   68-80  1960 OL PR (Rome)
Denmark	EU	6	6	0	1.000	532	377	+155	Extended content 109-81 2027 WC QL (Madrid)  74-64  2027 WC QL (Farum)  87-46  2003 EB-QL FR (Arganda)   96-66  2003 EB-QL FR (Copenhagen)   80-63  1999 EB-QL FR (Vejle)   86-57  1999 EB-QL FR (Torrelavega)
Japan	AS	6	6	0	1.000	535	368	+167	Extended content 88-77  2020 OL PR (Saitama)  104-55 2006 WC PR (Hiroshima)   91-38  2003 Friendly (Huelva)   99-58  2000 Friendly (Tokyo)   87-76  1972 OL PR (Munich)   66-64  1960 OL CL (Rome)
Senegal	AF	6	6	0	1.000	511	342	+169	Extended content 80-69  2017 Friendly (Melilla)  96-49  2015 Friendly (Santander)   89-56  2014 WC R16 (Madrid)   88-49  2014 Friendly (Las Palmas)   94-65  1980 OL PR (Moscow)   64-54  1968 OL PR (Mexico City)
Austria	EU	5	5	0	1.000	394	269	+125	Extended content 104-76 1979 Friendly (Haifa)   88-84  1977 EB CR (Liège)   64-33  1959 EB CR (Istanbul)   62-58  1957 Friendly (Vienna)   76-18  1950 WC-QL MR (Nice)
Uruguay	AM	5	5	0	1.000	411	336	+75	Extended content 107-90 1984 OL PR (Los Angeles)   71-42  1970 Friendly (Madrid)   88-69  1970 Friendly (Badalona)   68-63  1968 OL-QL MR (Monterrey)   77-72  1960 OL PR (Rome)
Philippines	AS	5	4	1	.800	459	383	+76	Extended content 117-85 1974 WC PR (San Juan, PR)   108-79 1968 OL PR (Rome)   70-58  1962 Friendly (Taipei)   82-77  1962 Friendly (Manila)   82-84  1960 OL PR (Rome)
Belarus	EU	4	4	0	1.000	358	274	+84	Extended content 80-60  2019 WC QL (Málaga)   84-82  2019 WC QL (Minsk)   93-79  1999 EB-QL FR (Minsk)    101-53 1999 EB-QL FR (Alcoy)
Ivory Coast	AF	4	4	0	1.000	358	257	+101	Extended content 94-64  2023 WC 1R (Jakarta)  79-62  2019 Friendly (Málaga)  100-61 2016 Friendly (El Ejido)   85-70  2010 Friendly (Las Palmas)
Montenegro	EU	4	4	0	1.000	339	258	+81	Extended content 82-65  2022 EB PR (Tbilisi)   79-67  2019 WC QL (Zaragoza)  79-66  2019 WC QL (Podgorica)  99-60  2017 EB PR (Cluj-Napoca)
Chinese Taipei (Taiwan)	AS	3	3	0	1.000	239	175	+64	Extended content 70-58  1962 Friendly (Taipei)   86-62  1962 Friendly (Manila)   83-55  1960 OL-QL PR (Bologna)   ↑ As  Formosa
Dominican Republic	AM	3	3	0	1.000	272	221	+51	Extended content 84-74  2024 Friendly (Madrid)  86-77  2023 Friendly (Granada)  102-70 2019 Friendly (Madrid)
Iceland	EU	3	3	0	1.000	266	191	+75	Extended content 80-61  2023 WC QL (Reykjavík)   87-57  2023 WC QL (Pamplona)   99-73  2015 EB PR (Berlin)
New Zealand	AS	3	3	0	1.000	275	238	+37	Extended content ↑ Since 2017, as member of FIBA Asia  101-84 2010 WC PR (İzmir)   86-70  2006 WC PR (Hiroshima)   88-84  2004 OL PR (Athens)  ↑ As member of FIBA Oceania
North Macedonia	AS	3	3	0	1.000	266	189	+77	Extended content 80-44  2023 WC QL (Sevilla)  94-65  2023 WC QL (Skopje)   92-80  2011 EB SF (Kaunas)
South Korea	AS	3	3	0	1.000	348	231	+117	Extended content 98-57  1994 WC CR (Hamilton)   130-101 1990 WC PR (Villa Ballester)   120-73 1986 WC PR (Zaragoza)
Bosnia and Herzegovina	EU	2	2	1	.667	240	215	+25	Extended content 88-67  2025 EB 1R (Limassol)   56-59  1997 Friendly (Zaragoza)   96-89  1993 EB PR (Karlsruhe)
East Germany	EU	3	1	2	.333	230	236	-6	Extended content 76-78  1965 EB CR (Moscow)   69-67  1964 OL-QL FR (Geneva)   85-91  1963 EB PR (Wrocław)
Nigeria	AF	2	2	0	1.000	176	155	+21	Extended content 96-87  2016 OL PR (Rio)   80-68  1998 WC PR (Athens)
Syria	AS	2	2	0	1.000	166	122	+44	Extended content 60-44  1951 MG MR (Alexandria)   106-78 1987 MG MR (Alexandria)
Slovakia	EU	2	2	0	1.000	160	143	+17	Extended content 84-71 2025 EB-QL FR (Ourense)   76-72 2025 EB-QL FR (Bratislava)
Chile	AM	2	1	1	.500	129	123	+6	Extended content 89-69  1966 Friendly (Santiago de Chile)   40-54  1950 WC PR (Buenos Aires)
Algeria	AF	1	1	0	1.000	102	61	+41	Extended content 102-61 1967 MG MR (Tunisia)
Bahamas	AM	1	1	0	1.000	86	78	+8	Extended content 86-78  2024 OL-QL FR (Valencia)
Colombia	AM	1	1	0	1.000	137	84	+53	Extended content 137-84 1982 WC FR (Cali)
DR Congo	AF	1	1	0	1.000	96	64	+32	Extended content 96-64   2019 Friendly (Málaga)
Cyprus	EU	1	1	0	1.000	91	47	+44	Extended content 91-47  2025 EB 1R (Limassol)
El Salvador	AM	1	1	0	1.000	124	66	+58	Extended content 124-66 1974 Friendly (San Salvador)
Estonia	EU	1	1	0	1.000	119	80	+39	Extended content 119-80 1993 EB CR (Munich)
Indonesia	AS	1	1	0	1.000	105	69	+36	Extended content 105-69 1968 OL-QL MR (Monterrey)
Ireland	EU	1	1	0	1.000	118	62	+56	Extended content 118-62  1988 OL-QL PR (Groningen)
Libya	AF	1	1	0	1.000	118	32	+86	Extended content 118-32  1963 EB-QL FR (Madrid)
Luxembourg	EU	1	1	0	1.000	88	58	+30	Extended content 88-58  1964 OL-QL PR (Geneva)
Morocco	AF	1	1	0	1.000	118	54	+64	Extended content 118-54 1963 MG MR (Naples)
Scotland	EU	1	1	0	1.000	113	68	+45	Extended content 113-68  1979 EB-QL PR (Athens)
Sudan	AF	1	1	0	1.000	88	40	+48	Extended content 88-40  1960 OL-QL PR (Bologna)
Suriname	AM	1	1	0	1.000	77	54	+23	Extended content 77-54  1960 OL-QL PR (Bologna)
Ecuador	AM	1	0	1	.000	50	54	-4	Extended content 50-54  1950 WC CR (Mar del Plata)
Peru	AM	1	0	1	.000	37	43	-6	Extended content 37-43  1950 WC CR (Mar del Plata)

== See also ==
- Spain national basketball team
- Spanish Basketball Federation
- Spain national youth basketball teams
- Basketball at the Summer Olympics
- FIBA Basketball World Cup
- FIBA EuroBasket
