= Romário Roque =

Colombian professional basketball player

Romario José Roque Martínez
Caribbean Storm Islands
- Position: Point guard / Shooting guard
- League: Baloncesto Profesional Colombiano

Personal information
- Born: 17 December 1998 (age 27) Barranquilla, Colombia
- Listed height: 176 cm (5 ft 9 in)
- Listed weight: 78 kg (172 lb)

Career information
- Playing career: 2018–present

Career history
- 2018–2019: Titanes de Barranquilla
- 2019: Tigrillos Medellín
- 2020: Cimarrones del Chocó
- 2021: Club Trouville
- 2022-2023: BBC Nyon
- 2023: Caribbean Storm Islands
- 2023: Pato Basquete
- 2024: Caballeros de Culiacán
- 2025: La Unión de Formosa
- 2025-present: Caribbean Storm Islands

Romário José Roque Martínez (born 17 December 1998 in Barranquilla, Colombia) is a Colombian basketball guard known for his scoring, playmaking, and international experience across Latin America and Europe.

== Club career ==
Roque’s professional journey began in Colombia with stints at Titanes de Barranquilla, Tigrillos Medellín, and Cimarrones del Chocó. In 2023, he expanded his resume internationally with teams in Uruguay (Club Trouville), Switzerland (BBC Nyon), Brazil (Pato Basquete), and Mexico (Caballeros de Culiacán), where he joined compatriots Michael Jackson and Soren De Luque under coach Bernardo Fitz-González. He later joined Caribbean Storm Islands, with whom he won the national championship in 2023.

Roque was awarded Player of the Week in the 2024 Baloncesto Profesional Colombiano after recording 35 points, 7 rebounds, and 4 assists in a win over Toros del Valle. He averaged 26.4 points, 3.6 rebounds, and 4.3 assists per game at that stage.

In 2025, he signed with Argentina’s La Unión de Formosa, marking his first foray into the Liga Nacional de Básquetbol; that season, he averaged 18.1 points, 4.1 rebounds, 4.8 assists, and 2.2 steals over 32 games.

== National team career ==
Roque has represented Colombia men's national basketball team across youth and senior levels. He played in the South American U17 Championship in 2015, averaging 19.2 points, 7.6 rebounds, and 3.2 assists per game. He has been part of the senior national team setup since 2020, participating in qualifiers for the FIBA AmeriCup and FIBA World Cup.

== Playing style ==
He earned a reputation for his quickness and offensive versatility.
