= Kammron Taylor =

American professional basketball player (born 1984)

Personal information
- Born: August 28, 1984 (age 41) Chicago, Illinois, U.S.
- Listed height: 6 ft 2 in (1.88 m)
- Listed weight: 175 lb (79 kg)

Career information
- High school: North Community (Minneapolis, Minnesota)
- College: Wisconsin (2003–2007)
- NBA draft: 2007: undrafted
- Playing career: 2007–2016
- Position: Point guard

Career history
- 2007–2008: CB L'Hospitalet
- 2008: Kepez Belediyesi
- 2008–2009: Beirasar Rosalía
- 2009–2010: STB Le Havre
- 2010: Szolnoki Olaj
- 2011: Keravnos
- 2011: Guerreros de Bogotá
- 2012: Dnipro-Azot
- 2012–2013: Neckar RIESEN Ludwigsburg
- 2013–2014: Maine Red Claws
- 2015: Gigantes de Guayana
- 2016: Saint John Riptide

Career highlights
- Honorable Mention All-Big Ten (2006); Second-team All-Big Ten (2007)

Kammron Taylor (born August 28, 1984) is an American professional basketball player who last played for the Saint John Riptide of the National Basketball League of Canada. He played college basketball for the University of Wisconsin–Madison.

== Early life ==
Taylor played basketball with his older brother, Kerek, in their garage in the backyard of their home in Minneapolis, Minnesota. Their father, Kenneth, kept the garage pitch black so the brothers would learn to dribble without seeing the ball. He attended North Community High School where he played basketball, football and tennis.

== College career ==
Taylor was an honorable mention all-conference pick as a junior with the Wisconsin Badgers, when he averaged 14.2 points, 3.0 rebounds and 2.4 assists per game. After struggling late in the season, he improved his diet and entered his senior year more muscular.

In his senior season, he was named to the All-Big Ten second team and the Big Ten All-Tournament team. In 36 games, he averaged 13.3 points, 2.3 rebounds and 1.9 assists per game.

== Professional career ==
After going undrafted in the 2007 NBA draft, Taylor joined the Minnesota Timberwolves for the 2007 NBA Summer League. He later signed with CB L'Hospitalet of the Spanish LEB Oro for the 2007–08 season.

In 2008, Taylor signed with Kepez Belediyesi of the Turkish Basketball League for the 2008–09 season. In December 2008, left Turkey and returned to Spain to play with Beirasar Rosalía.

In July 2009, he signed with STB Le Havre of the French League for the 2009–10 season. In February 2010, he left France and signed with Szolnoki Olaj of Hungary for the rest of the season.

On November 1, 2010, he was selected by the Iowa Energy in the 3rd round of the 2010 NBA D-League draft. On November 17, 2010, he was waived by the Energy. In January 2011, he signed with Keravnos of Cyprus for the rest of the 2010–11 season. He later left Keravnos after 2 games and joined Guerreros de Bogotá for the 2011 Baloncesto Profesional Colombiano season.

In January 2012, he signed with Panteras de Miranda for the 2012 LBP season. In February 2012, he left Panteras and signed with BC Dnipro-Azot for the rest of the 2011–12 season.

In July 2012, he re-joined the Minnesota Timberwolves for the 2012 NBA Summer League. In August 2012, he signed with Neckar RIESEN Ludwigsburg of the German Basketball Bundesliga. On January 21, 2013, he was released.

On September 30, 2013, he signed with the Boston Celtics. However, he was later waived by the Celtics on October 26, 2013. On October 31, 2013, he was acquired by the Maine Red Claws as an affiliate player. On January 4, 2014, he was waived by the Red Claws due to a season-ending knee injury.

In January 2015, he joined the Gigantes de Guayana of the Venezuelan Liga Profesional de Baloncesto. He left the team in late April, and in 28 games, he averaged 11.8 points, 2.2 rebounds and 2.6 assists per game.

On November 10, 2016, he signed with the Saint John Riptide for the 2016–17 NBL Canada season.
