= Ashley Pérez =

Ashley Pérez may refer to:

- Ashley Pérez (basketball), Puerto Rican basketball player
- Ashley Hope Pérez, American author
- Ashley Pérez, of the Mexican-American Latin pop duo Ha*Ash
