= Hansel Atencia =

Colombian-Spanish basketball player

No. 0 – Palmer Basket
- Position: Point guard
- League: Primera FEB

Personal information
- Born: 24 May 1997 (age 29) Barrancabermeja, Colombia
- Listed height: 180 cm (5 ft 11 in)
- Listed weight: 77 kg (170 lb)

Career information
- High school: Mountain Mission; Grundy, Virginia
- College: Liberty (2015–2016); The Master's (2016–2019)
- Playing career: 2019–present

Career history
- 2013–2014: Bucaros Freskaleche
- 2019–2020: Þór Akureyri
- 2020–2021: Haukar
- 2020: → Titanes de Barranquilla
- 2021: Titanes de Barranquilla
- 2022: Oviedo
- 2022–2023: Estudiantes
- 2023: Búcaros
- 2023–2024: Cáceres
- 2024: Titanes de Barranquilla
- 2024: Real Valladolid
- 2024–2025: Real Betis
- 2025: Estela
- 2025: Estudiantes
- 2025–present: Palmer Basket

Career highlights
- 2x Liga de Baloncesto Profesional champion (2020, 2021); Second-team NAIA All-American (2019)
Medals
Men's basketball
Representing Colombia
Central American and Caribbean Games
Silver medal – second place	2018 Colombia	Team

Hansel Giovanny Atencia Suarez (born 24 May 1997) is a Colombian-Spanish basketball player for Palmer Basket of the Spanish Primera FEB. He is a member of the Colombia national basketball team.

== Playing career ==
=== College career ===
Atencia averaged a team-leading 17.5 points and 5.3 assists during his senior season at The Master's University and was named to the NAIA All-American Second Team.

=== Professional career ===
After graduating from college, Atencia signed with Úrvalsdeild karla club Þór Akureyri in June 2019. He appeared in 21 games for Þór in the Úrvalsdeild before the final game and the playoffs where canceled due to the coronavirus pandemic in Iceland, averaging 18.2 points and 5.6 assists.

The following season, Atencia stayed in the Úrvalsdeild, signing with Haukar. In November 2020, it was announced that Haukar had loaned Atencia to Titanes de Barranquilla due to the COVID-19 stoppage in the Úrvalsdeild. He was expected to finish the Colombian leagues season with Titanes and return to Iceland in December. On 22 November 2020, he helped Titanes win the Liga de Baloncesto Profesional championship. On 25 April 2021, Atencia made a running three point shot from just inside the half court line at the buzzer to help Haukar beat KR 72–69.

Following the Úrvalsdeild season, Atencia returned to Titanes and helped them win their fourth consecutive LBP title on 7 June 2021. On 3 February 2022, he signed with Oviedo CB of the LEB Oro. In October 2025, he signed for Palmer Basket of the Spanish Primera FEB.
