= Juan Palacios (basketball) =

Colombian basketball player

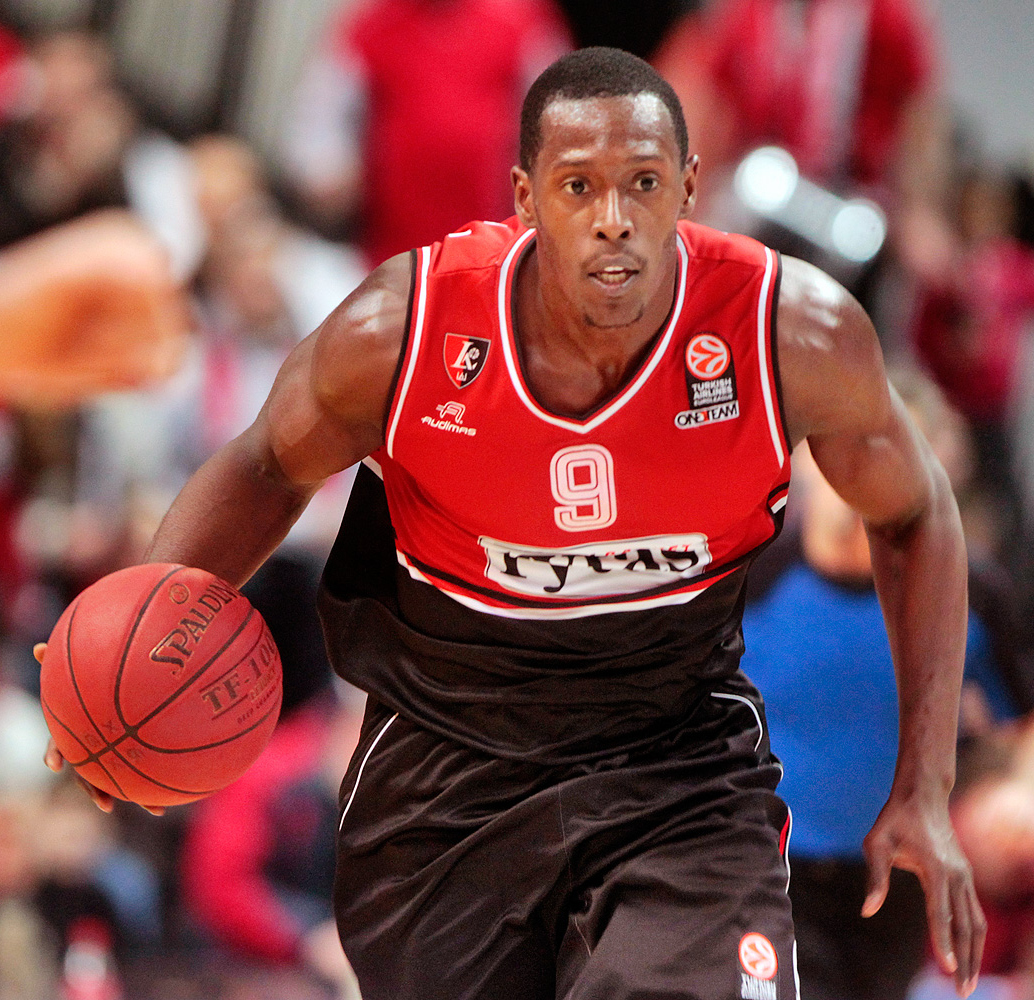
- Palacios with Lietuvos rytas in 2014

Regatas Corrientes
- Position: Power forward / center
- League: Liga Nacional de Básquet

Personal information
- Born: May 11, 1985 (age 41) Medellín, Colombia
- Listed height: 6 ft 9 in (2.06 m)
- Listed weight: 244 lb (111 kg)

Career information
- High school: Our Saviour New American (Centereach, New York)
- College: Louisville (2004–2008)
- NBA draft: 2008: undrafted
- Playing career: 2008–present

Career history
- 2008–2009: CB Vic
- 2009–2011: UB La Palma
- 2011–2012: Gran Canaria
- 2012–2013: Guerreros de Bogotá
- 2013: JSF Nanterre
- 2013–2014: Lietuvos rytas
- 2014–2016: Pınar Karşıyaka
- 2017: Tofaş
- 2017: Neptūnas Klaipėda
- 2018: Beşiktaş
- 2018–2019: Élan Chalon
- 2019–2020: Estudiantes
- 2020–2021: Titanes de Barranquilla
- 2021–2022: CBet Jonava
- 2022–2023: Libertadores de Querétaro
- 2023: Guaros de Lara
- 2023: Titanes de Barranquilla
- 2023–2024: Changwon LG Sakers
- 2024: Cimarrones del Chocó
- 2025: Biguá
- 2026-present: Regatas Corrientes

Career highlights
- Turkish League champion (2015); LKL MVP (2014); LKL All-Star (2014); LNB Pro A champion (2013)

Juan Diego Tello Palacios (born 11 May 1985) is a Colombian professional basketball player.

== High school ==
Born in Medellín, Colombia, Palacios attended high school at Our Savior New American in Centereach, New York, United States. As a senior, he averaged 20.2 points, 9.3 rebounds, and 2.2 steals.

== College career ==
Palacios played college basketball at the University of Louisville, from 2004 to 2008, averaging 8.9 points and 5.7 rebounds per game. He had hoped to become the first Colombian to play in the NBA, but he was not selected in the 2008 NBA draft. In the Louisville Media Guide, he listed former Cardinal player Francisco Garcia, as his favorite NBA player.

== Professional career ==
After one year at CB Vic, where Palacios debuted as professional player, and two years playing on loan at UB La Palma, in LEB Oro, CB Gran Canaria added him to play in Spain's top-tier level Liga ACB, in 2011. On 14 August 2013, he signed with Lietuvos Rytas, of the Lithuanian Basketball League. In August 2014, he signed a one-year deal with Pınar Karşıyaka.

On 15 February 2017, Palacios signed with Turkish club Tofaş, for the rest of the 2016–17 BSL season. On August 10, 2017, Palacios signed with Lithuanian club Neptūnas Klaipėda, for the 2017–18 season. On 2 January 2018, he moved to the Turkish club Beşiktaş. He signed with Élan Chalon of the French league on 20 July 2018. On 2 August 2019, Palacios signed a one-year deal with Spanish club Movistar Estudiantes.

== Career statistics ==
Legend
GP	Games played	GS	Games started	MPG	Minutes per game
FG%	Field-goal percentage	3P%	3-point field-goal percentage	FT%	Free-throw percentage
RPG	Rebounds per game	APG	Assists per game	SPG	Steals per game
BPG	Blocks per game	PPG	Points per game	PIR	Performance index rating
**Bold**	Career high

=== EuroLeague ===
Year	Team	GP	GS	MPG	FG%	3P%	FT%	RPG	APG	SPG	BPG	PPG	PIR
2013–14	Lietuvos rytas	10	9	25.3	.407	.000	.743	5.6	1.4	.8	1.1	10.0	10.6
2015–16	Karşıyaka	9	4	21.6	.393	.176	.545	4.2	1.2	1.6	.1	8.3	6.4
Career		19	13	23.6	.400	.125	.696	4.9	1.3	1.2	.6	9.2	8.6

=== Domestic leagues ===
Season	Team	League	GP	MPG	FG%	3P%	FT%	RPG	APG	SPG	BPG	PPG
2008–09	CB Vic	LEB Oro	30	19.6	.489	.256	.649	4.1	.7	.7	.2	8.6
2009–10	UB La Palma	LEB Oro	34	26.7	.461	.227	.808	6.6	1.8	1.2	.3	13.1
2010–11	UB La Palma	LEB Oro	29	27.6	.509	.316	.742	6.5	1.9	1.5	.3	16.9
2011–12	CB Gran Canaria	ACB	31	19.2	.456	.286	.793	4.3	.7	.6	.1	7.6
2012	Guerreros de Bogotá	Liga DirecTV	?	?	?	?	?	?	?	?	?	?
2012–13	JSF Nanterre	LNB Pro A	22	18.6	.467	.462	.600	4.6	1.0	.9	.3	7.4
2013–14	Lietuvos rytas	LKL	26	23.2	.598	.250	.630	6.7	2.1	1.5	.3	14.4
2013–14	Lietuvos rytas	VTB	24	25.5	.581	.500	.711	6.5	2.0	1.1	.3	13.3
2014–15	Pinar Karşıyaka	BSL	42	26.9	.474	.111	.667	6.8	2.1	1.1	.3	12.1
