= Tigrillos Medellín =

- League: Baloncesto Profesional Colombiano
- Founded: November 30, 2012; 12 years ago
- History: Academia de la Montaña; 2012–2020; Tigrillos Medellín; 2020–present
- Arena: Coliseo Iván de Bedout
- Capacity: 6,000
- Location: Medellín, Antioquia, Colombia
- Head coach: Raúl Edgardo Pabón Porras
- Championships: 1 (2016-I)

Tigrillos Medellín Basket Club (in English: Medellín Tigers Basketball Club) is a Colombian basketball club based in Medellín. They play in the Baloncesto Profesional Colombiano, the top level league in Colombia. Founded in 2012 as Academia de la Montaña, home games are played in the Coliseo Iván de Bedout.

Tigrillos had its best season in 2016-I, when they won their first national championship.

== History ==
The team was founded on November 30, 2012, and entered the league in the 2013-I season and was among the six best teams of the leagues. In the following 2013-II season, they played in the Grand Final.

Three years later, in the 2016-I season, Academia de la Montaña won their first national championship.

In 2020, the team name was changed to Tigrillos Medellín.

In the 2021-I season, Tigrillos reached its second Grand Final and lost to Titanes de Barranquilla.

== Honours ==
Baloncesto Profesional Colombiano

- Champions (1): 2016-I
  - Runners-up (2): 2013-II, 2021-I

== Notable players ==
Note: Flags indicate national team eligibility at FIBA-sanctioned events. Players may hold other non-FIBA nationalities not displayed.

Criteria

To appear in this section a player must have either:

- Set a club record or won an individual award while at the club
- Played at least one official international match for their national team at any time
- Played at least one official NBA match at any time.

- (Colombia) Romário Roque
