= Gary Browne (basketball) =

Puerto Rican basketball player (born 1993)

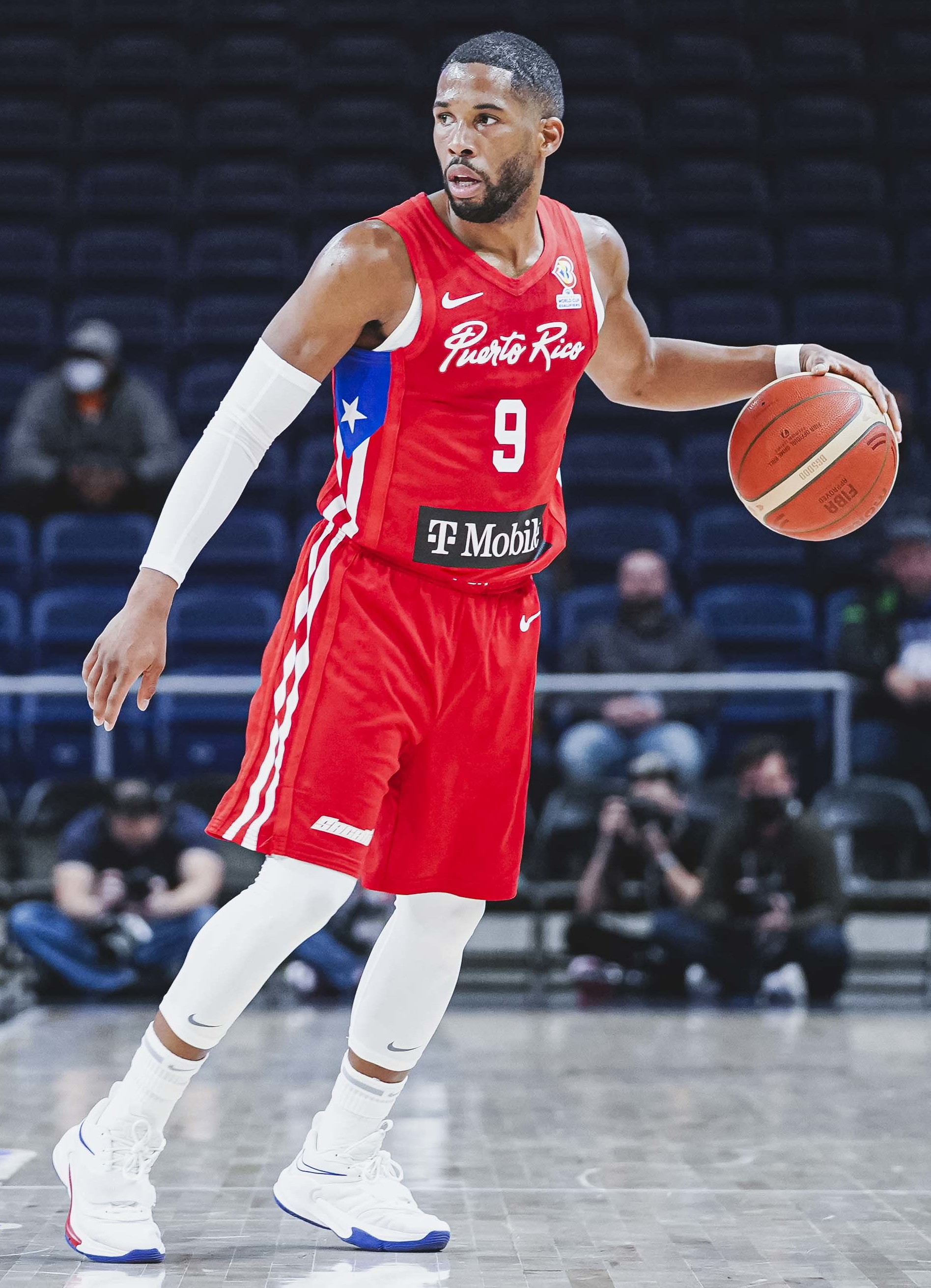
- Browne with the Puerto Rico national team in 2023

No. 14 – Bosna
- Position: Point guard
- League: ABA League; EuroCup

Personal information
- Born: March 24, 1993 (age 33) Trujillo Alto, Puerto Rico
- Listed height: 6 ft 1 in (1.85 m)
- Listed weight: 190 lb (86 kg)

Career information
- High school: Arlington Country Day (Jacksonville, Florida); Saint Francis (Carolina, Puerto Rico)
- College: West Virginia (2011–2015)
- NBA draft: 2015: undrafted
- Playing career: 2015–present

Career history
- 2015: Maratonistas de Coamo
- 2016–2019: Atléticos de San Germán
- 2017–2019: Ironi Nes Ziona
- 2019–2020: Darüşşafaka Tekfen
- 2020–2021: Dolomiti Energia Trento
- 2021–2022: Petkim Spor
- 2022: Piratas de Quebradillas
- 2022–2024: South East Melbourne Phoenix
- 2023–2024: Mets de Guaynabo
- 2024–2026: Vaqueros de Bayamón
- 2026–present: Bosna

Career highlights
- 2× BSN champion (2025, 2026); BSN Most Valuable Player (2017); BSN All-Star (2017); BSN Most Improved Player (2017); 2× BSN assists leader (2017, 2023)
Medals
Men's basketball
Representing Puerto Rico
Central American and Caribbean Games
Gold medal – first place	2018 Barranquilla

Gary Browne Ramírez (born March 24, 1993) is a Puerto Rican professional basketball player for Bosna of the ABA League and the EuroCup. He played college basketball at West Virginia, and represents the Puerto Rican national team in international competitions.

Browne was named the Most Valuable Player and Most Improved Player by the Baloncesto Superior Nacional (BSN) after his breakthrough season with Atléticos de San Germán in 2017. He was also named as a reserve for the league All-Star Game.

== Early life ==
Gary Browne Ramírez was born in Trujillo Alto, Puerto Rico to Gary Browne, Sr. and Anamaris Rodríguez. However, he was raised in San Juan, specifically in Cupey. He started playing basketball as a child. At the age of 14, he moved to the United States and attended Arlington Country Day School in Jacksonville, Florida. He would then come back to Puerto Rico and attend Saint Francis School in Carolina, where he played for the basketball team.

== College career ==
In 2011, Browne enrolled at West Virginia University and joined the Mountaineers basketball team. He played with the team for four seasons, averaging 6.2 points per game. As a senior, he averaged 7.0 points per game. He sprained his ankle in February 2015. After graduating, Browne made himself eligible for the 2015 NBA draft, but went undrafted.

== Professional career ==
=== Puerto Rico (2015–2019) ===
In 2015, Browne joined the Maratonistas de Coamo of the BSN league in Puerto Rico. He played in a total of 7 games, averaging 4 points and 1.9 assists per game. However, he did not play in the 2016 season. That year, the Atléticos de San Germán acquired the rights to Browne. He said in an interview that he took the off-year to prepare himself physically for the 2017 season.

Browne began the 2017 season as San Germán's starting point guard. He led the league in assists all through the season, finishing with an average of 7.5 per game. Browne's performance led his team into the playoffs, where they were eliminated by the Piratas de Quebradillas. Browne finished the season with averages of 11.9 points and 6.4 rebounds per game, and improved to 14.6 points, 8.2 rebounds, and 7.8 assists per game in the playoffs. On July 19, he was named the league's Most-Improved Player. Two weeks later, he was awarded the Most Valuable Player.

On June 7, 2018, Browne re-signed with Atléticos de San Germán for the 2018 BSN Season. In 19 games played during the 2018 season, he averaged 17.1 points, 6.3 rebounds, 7.2 assists and 1.5 steals per game.

On June 11, 2019, Browne re-signed with Atléticos de San Germán for the 2019 BSN Season.

=== Israel (2017–2019) ===
On August 2, 2017, Browne signed with the Israeli team Ironi Nes Ziona for the 2017–18 season. On April 28, 2018, Browne recorded a career-high 32 points, shooting 6-of-10 from three-point range, along with six rebounds and six assists in a 101–91 win over Maccabi Rishon LeZion. Browne helped Nes Ziona to reach the 2018 Israeli League Playoffs, where they eventually lost to Maccabi Tel Aviv in the Quarterfinals.

On July 1, 2018, Browne signed a one-year contract extension with Ironi Nes Ziona. On January 19, 2019, Browne recorded a season-high 28 points, shooting 9-of-11 from the field, along with four rebounds, six assists and two steals, leading Nes Ziona to a 103–93 comeback win over Ironi Nahariya. He was subsequently named Israeli League Round 15 MVP. In 36 Israeli League games played during the 2018–19 season, he averaged 13.9 points, 4.8 rebounds, 4.9 assists and 1.1 steals per game, while shooting 39.5 percent from three-point range. Browne helped Nes Ziona reach the 2019 Israeli League Playoffs, where they eventually were eliminated by Hapoel Eilat in the Quarterfinals.

=== Turkey (2019–2020) ===
On September 23, 2019, Browne signed with Darüşşafaka Tekfen of the Turkish Basketbol Süper Ligi as an injury cover for Joe Ragland. He averaged 10.8 points and 3.6 assists per game. On July 5, 2020, Browne parted ways with the team.

=== Italy (2020–2021) ===
On July 14, 2020, Browne signed with Dolomiti Energia Trento of the Italian Lega Basket Serie A.

=== Return to Turkey (2021–2022) ===
On August 5, 2021, Browne signed with Petkim Spor of the Turkish Basketball Super League (BSL).

=== Return to Puerto Rico (2022) ===
In March 2022, Browne joined Piratas de Quebradillas.

=== Australia and Puerto Rico (2022–2024) ===
On June 15, 2022, Browne signed with the South East Melbourne Phoenix in Australia for the 2022–23 NBL season. He missed the first four games of the season after sustaining a knee injury during pre-season.

Following the NBL season, Browne played for Mets de Guaynabo in the BSN.

On July 26, 2023, Browne re-signed with the Phoenix for the 2023–24 NBL season.

On June 11, 2024, Browne was traded to the Vaqueros de Bayamón.

== National team career ==
Browne is a member of the Puerto Rico national basketball team.

In August 2018, Browne won the 2018 Central American and Caribbean Games Championship with the Puerto Rican team.

On September 4, 2019, Browne scored a game-winning three-pointer against Tunisia with 5.1 seconds left, leading Puerto Rico to the second round of the 2019 FIBA World Cup.
