= Stalin Ortiz =

Colombian basketball player

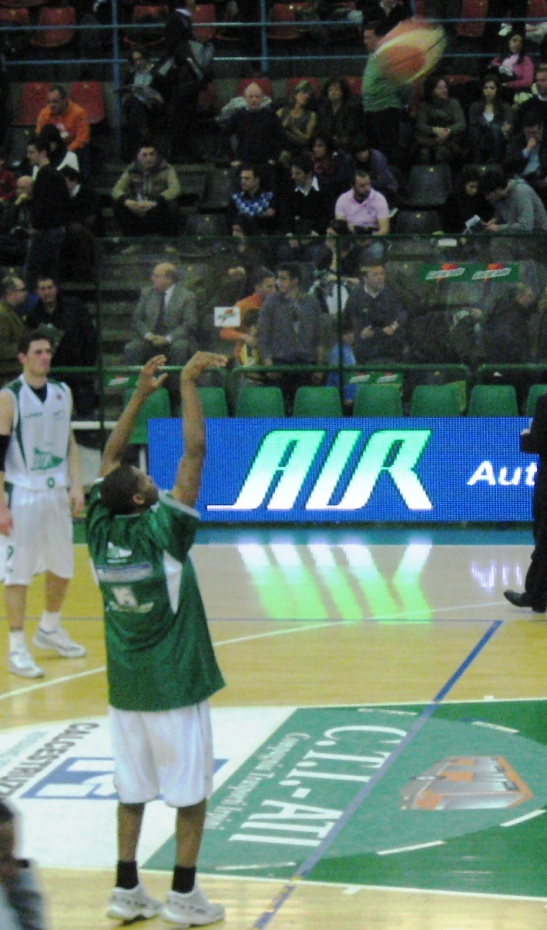

Condores
- Position: Small forward
- League: Baloncesto Profesional Colombiano

Personal information
- Born: February 8, 1981 (age 45) Cali, Colombia
- Listed height: 6 ft 3 in (1.91 m)

Career information
- College: Valparaiso (2001-2003)
- Playing career: 2003–present

Career history
- 2016-now: Condores

Stalin Ortiz (born February 8, 1981), is a Colombian professional basketball player. He currently plays for the Condores club of the Baloncesto Profesional Colombiano league.

He represented Colombia's national basketball team at the 2016 South American Basketball Championship, where he had most minutes, points and steals for his team.
