= Palmer Basket Mallorca Palma =

Palmer Basket
- Leagues: Primera FEB
- Founded: 2022
- Arena: Son Moix
- Capacity: 5,076
- Location: Palma, Mallorca
- Team colors: Turquoise, orange and black
- President: Vicenç Palmer
- Head coach: Iñigo Núñez
- Website: palmerbasket.com
Home	Away

Palmer Basket Mallorca Palma, commonly known simply as Palmer Basket, is a basketball team based in Palma, Mallorca. The team currently plays in Primera FEB, the second tier of Spanish basketball.

== History ==
The club is owned by a Majorcan business family that manages Grupo Palmer, a real estate company. It had previously collaborated with another Majorcan basketball club, CB Bahía San Agustín, which it sponsored between 2020 and 2022.

The club was created in 2022 after reaching an agreement to take over the berth of Joventut Llucmajor in the Liga EBA, the fourth tier of the Spanish basketball league system.

Winning the 2022–23 Liga EBA championship in its first season in the competition, Palmer Basket achieved promotion to the LEB Plata, the third tier of Spanish basketball.

In the 2023–24 LEB Plata season, Palmer Basket managed to avoid relegation and remain in the category after its first season in the competition.

In its second season in the now renamed Segunda FEB, Palmer Basket managed to be crowned champions of the 2024–25 season and once again achieve promotion, this time to Primera FEB, the second tier of Spanish basketball.

== Players ==
=== Current roster ===
Note: Flags indicate national team eligibility at FIBA-sanctioned events. Players may hold other non-FIBA nationalities not displayed.

Palmer Basket roster
Players
Coaches

Pos.	No.	Nat.	Name	Ht.	Age
C	1	(Canada) (Bosnia and Herzegovina)	Nenadic, Milos	2.12 m (6 ft 11 in)	23 – 15 September 2003
SF	3	(United States) (Cape Verde)	Brito, Octavio	1.93 m (6 ft 4 in)	23 – 8 March 2003
PF	4	(Georgia (country))	Salaridze, Vladimer	2.01 m (6 ft 7 in)	24 – 16 August 2002
SF	5	(Sweden)	Jolinder, David	2.00 m (6 ft 7 in)	25 – 5 September 2001
PG	7	(Spain)	Blanco, Álex	1.90 m (6 ft 3 in)	19 – 14 March 2007
PF	8	(Germany)	Wimberg, Jan Niklas	1.92 m (6 ft 4 in)	30 – 11 February 1996
SG	11	(British Virgin Islands)	Hodge, D'Moi	1.91 m (6 ft 3 in)	27 – 20 December 1998
PG	13	(Canada)	Mingo, Dezayne	1.93 m (6 ft 4 in)	24 – 13 January 2002
PG	15	(Spain)	Feliu, Joan	1.85 m (6 ft 1 in)	27 – 12 October 1999
C	17	(Bulgaria)	Stoilov, Emil	2.13 m (7 ft 0 in)	26 – 24 July 2000
PG	22	(Israel) (Spain)	Artman, Guy	1.85 m (6 ft 1 in)	24 – 9 February 2002
F	24	(Spain)	Comendador, Ángel	2.03 m (6 ft 8 in)	25 – 22 July 2001
SG	33	(Spain)	Torres, Kevin	1.88 m (6 ft 2 in)	23 – 22 July 2003
G/F	43	(Spain)	Sastre, Joan	2.01 m (6 ft 7 in)	34 – 10 December 1991

Head coach

- (Spain) Iñigo Núñez

Legend

- (C) Team captain
- Injured

- Roster
Updated: October 11, 2026

=== Depth chart ===
Pos.	Starting 5	Bench 1	Bench 2
C	Emil Stoilov	Milos Nenadic
PF	Jan Niklas Wimberg	Vladimer Salaridze	Ángel Comendador
SF	Octavio Brito	Joan Sastre	David Jolinder
SG	Kevin Torres	D'Moi Hodge	Guy Artman
PG	Dezayne Mingo	Joan Feliu	Álex Blanco

Colours: Blue = homegrown player; Red = non-FIBA Europe player

== Season by season ==
Season	Tier	Division	Pos.	W–L	Cup competitions	
2022–23	4	Liga EBA	1st (Note: Achieved promotion to LEB Plata.)	23–3		
2023–24	3	LEB Plata	11th	10–16		
2024–25	3	Segunda FEB	1st (Note: Achieved promotion to Primera FEB.)	23–3	Spain Cup	GS
2025–26	2	Primera FEB	15th	8–24	Spain Cup	R16

== Notable players ==
Note: Flags indicate national team eligibility at FIBA-sanctioned events. Players may hold other non-FIBA nationalities not displayed.

Criteria

To appear in this section a player must have either:

- Set a club record or won an individual award while at the club
- Played at least one official international match for their national team at any time
- Played at least one official NBA match at any time.

- (Canada) Phil Scrubb
- (Colombia) Hansel Atencia
- (Georgia (country)) Duda Sanadze
- (Nigeria) Danny Agbelese
