= Spain national youth basketball teams =

Spain has the following men's national youth basketball teams:

- Spain national under-20 basketball team
- Spain national under-19 basketball team
- Spain national under-18 basketball team
- Spain national under-17 basketball team
- Spain national under-16 basketball team

== Overview of results of the men's national youth teams ==
	Europe U-20	World U-19	Europe U-18	World U-17	Europe U-16
2023	q	Gold medal	q		q
2022	Gold medal		Gold medal	Silver medal	Silver medal
2021		5th			
2019	Silver medal	DNQ	Gold medal		Gold medal
2018	7th		9th	DNQ	Silver medal
2017	4th	4th	Silver medal		8th
2016	Gold medal		5th	4th	Gold medal
2015	Silver medal	8th	7th		4th
2014	Silver medal		5th	4th	Bronze medal
2013	Bronze medal	5th	Bronze medal		Gold medal
2012	Bronze medal		5th	4th	7th
2011	Gold medal	DNQ	Gold medal		Bronze medal
2010	Bronze medal		11th	10th	4th
2009	Bronze medal	10th	5th		Gold medal
2008	Bronze medal		5th		6th
2007	Silver medal	8th	5th		Silver medal
2006	11th		Bronze medal		Gold medal
2005	9th		4th		Bronze medal
2004	11th		Gold medal		7th
2003		DNQ			4th
2002	Silver medal		9th		
2001					Bronze medal
2000	Bronze medal		11th		
1999		Gold medal			8th
1998	4th		Gold medal		
1997					6th
1996	Silver medal		9th		
1995		Bronze medal			Silver medal
1994	Bronze medal		Bronze medal		
1993					Silver medal
1992	6th		6th		
1991		6th			Bronze medal
1990			Bronze medal		
1989					6th
1988			6th		
1987		DNQ			4th
1986			5th		
1985					Silver medal
1984			4th		
1983		4th			Silver medal
1982			6th		
1981					9th
1980			4th		
1979		DNQ			Bronze medal
1978			Silver medal		
1977					5th
1976			Bronze medal		
1975					5th
1974			Silver medal		
1973					Silver medal
1972			7th		
1971					4th
1970			5th		
1968			5th		
1966			6th		
1964			8th		
