= Kentwan Smith =

Bahamian basketball player (born 1991)

No. 3 – Club Ourense Baloncesto
- Position: Power forward
- League: Primera FEB

Personal information
- Born: December 17, 1991 (age 34) Freeport, The Bahamas
- Listed height: 6 ft 8 in (2.03 m)
- Listed weight: 205 lb (93 kg)

Career information
- High school: Piney Woods High
- College: Lafayette (2011–2012); Otero Junior College (2012-2013); Stetson (2013–2015)
- NBA draft: 2015: undrafted
- Playing career: 2016–present

Career history
- 2015: BC Timișoara
- 2016: Fuerza Grinda de Nogales
- 2016–2017: BC Nokia
- 2017–2018: BK Patrioti Levice
- 2018: Basket Brno
- 2019–2021: Garonne Asptt Basket
- 2022–2023: Svendborg Rabbits
- 2023–2024: BC Luleå
- 2025–present: Club Ourense Baloncesto

Kentwan Kenneth Smith is a Bahamian professional basketball player for Ourense of the Primera FEB.

== Early years ==
Smith attended Piney Woods Country Life School, where he led his team to the 2011 State 2A championships for the first time since 1996.

== College career ==
Smith first attended University of Louisiana at Lafayette where he contributed 2.2 points and 1.7 rebounds in 7.4 minutes per game. Smith then transferred to Otero Junior College where he would then play 33 games and started 21 games as a sophomore. He contributed 10.4 points, 5.2 rebounds, and 2.1 assists per game. Smith would finish his college career with the Stetson Hatters where he would average 11.6 points, 5.9 rebounds, and 1.3 assists per game during his tenure at Stetson.

== Personal life ==
Smith is the son of Charlene and Kenneth Smith. He has three sisters.
