= Cóndores de Cundinamarca =

- Leagues: Baloncesto Profesional Colombiano
- Founded: 2013
- Arena: Coliseo de la Luna (8,000 spectators)
- Location: Chía, Cundinamarca, Colombia
- Website: Official website

Cóndores de Cundinamarca is a Colombian professional basketball team located in Chía, Cundinamarca, Colombia. The team currently competes in the Baloncesto Profesional Colombiano league.

== Notable players ==
To appear in this section a player must have either:

- Set a club record or won an individual award as a professional player.
- Played at least one official international match for his senior national team or one NBA game at any time.
- (Colombia) Freddy Asprilla
- (Colombia) Rodrigo Caicedo
- (Colombia) Stalin Ortiz
- (United States) Paul Davis
