= Búcaros de Bucaramanga =

Semiprofessional Colombian basketball team

- Bukaros de Bucaramanga
Link	Copa Invitacional de Baloncesto Colombiano
City	Bucaramanga
Country	Colombia
Headquarters	Coliseo Vicente Diaz Romero
Capacity	4.000 spectators
Colors	Yellow and white
Trainer	Carlos Parra
Championships	5 (1994 as the "Leopardos de Bucaramanga", 2006, 2007, 2011, 2012)

Bukaros is a semiprofessional Colombian basketball team that competes in the Copa Invitacional de Baloncesto Colombiano. Its home stadium is Vicente Diaz Romero Coliseum in Bucaramanga, which has a 4,000-person capacity.

The team is operated by the Ivan Olivares basketball school in Bucaramanga.

== Titles ==
1994 (as Leopardos); 2006; 2007; 2011; 2012
