= Ashley Pérez (basketball) =

Puerto Rican basketball player

Personal information
- Born: February 12, 1994 (age 32) Manchester, Connecticut, U.S.
- Listed height: 5 ft 7 in (1.70 m)

Career information
- College: JMU (2014–2016)
- WNBA draft: 2016: undrafted
- Position: Guard
Medals
Women's basketball
Representing Puerto Rico
Central American and Caribbean Games
Bronze medal – third place	2018 Barranquilla	Team

Ashley Pérez (born February 12, 1994) is a Puerto Rican basketball player for the Puerto Rican national team.

She participated at the 2018 FIBA Women's Basketball World Cup.
