= Toros del Valle =

- Founded: 2010
- History: Fastbreak del Valle (2010; 2017–2019); Team Cali (2019–2023); Toros del Valle (2023–present)
- Arena: Colosseum Evangelista Mora
- Capacity: 3,340
- Location: Cali, Colombia
- Chairman: Jhon Mario Tejada
- Head coach: Raul Pabon

Toros del Valle (literally in English: Bulls of the Valley) is a Colombian professional basketball club based in Cali, Valle del Cauca Department. The team was founded in 2010 as Fastbreak del Valle and made their debut in the Baloncesto Profesional Colombiano in the same year. Toros play their home games in the Coliseo Evangelista Mora, which has capacity for 3,400 people.

== History ==
After being established as Fastbreak del Valle in 2010, the team played in the Baloncesto Profesional Colombiano's Invitational Cup. Fastbreak finished in the 6th place with a 11–17 record. Following this season, the club did not play in any professional competition for seven years, until its return 2017. Valle del Cauca was however represented by Indervalle, in 2011, and Astros Blanco, in 2015.

In their return season in 2017, they finished first in the regular season of the Colombian League, and reached their first play-off finals. In the 2018 season, Fastbreak played in the Liga Sudamericana de Baloncesto, the second-level continental league, the team's debut in international play.

In 2019, the team was disestablished and re-founded as Team Cali Basketball Club. The team reached two finals series, in 2019 and 2020.

On 16 April 2024, a new team was founded under the name Toros del Valle, and replaced Team Cali in the league. In the 2024-I season, they made the finals once again.

On August 4, 2026, Toros del Valle received the belt from Texas A&M in the Baha Mar Summer League, losing 141-61.

== Honours ==
Baloncesto Profesional Colombiano

- Runners-up (4): 2017, 2019, 2020, 2024-I
