= Titanes de Barranquilla =

Colombian basketball team

- Leagues: Baloncesto Profesional Colombiano
- Founded: June 2018
- History: Titanes de Barranquilla; 2018–present
- Arena: Arena Deportiva Elías Chegwin
- Capacity: 5,000
- Location: Barranquilla, Colombia
- Head coach: Tomás Díaz
- Team captain: Gianluca Bacchi
- Championships: 9 (2018, 2019, 2020, 2021-I, 2021-II, 2022-I, 2022-II, 2023-II, 2024-I)
- Website: titanesbaq.com
Home	Away

Titanes de Barranquilla (in English: Titans of Barranquilla) is a Colombian professional basketball team based in Barranquilla. The team plays in the Baloncesto Profesional Colombiano, where it has won the championship a league-record nine times since the establishment of the team in 2018.

== History ==
During the 1990s, there was a professional team in the city of Barranquilla, named the Caimanes de Barranquilla. They played in the Baloncesto Profesional Colombiano and won three Colombian national championships (in 1995, 1997 and 1998). In 2003, the team was dissolved which marked the beginning of a 15-year drought of professional basketball in Barranquilla.

In June 2018, the Titanes de Barranquilla were founded by a group of businessmen in cooperation with the city's Mayor's Office. The team had its debut in October 2018 against the Warrios de San Andrés at the Arena Deportiva Elías Chegwin in Barranquilla, led by Tomás Díaz, coach of the national team and multiple champion of the Colombian league.

Titanes became the first Barranquilla team in 15 years to play in Colombia's first division. Barranquilla's major Alejandro Char Chaljub stressed that the team would enjoy his full support as it supports the development of the local youth. Chaljub added that the idea of having the professional team in Barranquilla came from him. He said “we studied it, analyzed it, and gave the go-ahead, because after the Central American and Caribbean Games the city was hungry for sports. And furthermore, these venues need important events to keep them running and what better way than to be with a team like Titanes at the Elías Chegwin stadium.”

According to head coach Tomás Díaz, the goal has been to compete internationally for both the senior team and for minors.

In the 2020–21 season, Titanes played in the BCL Americas, its debut in the pan-American top competition. One year later, in 2022, Titanes won the third place medal in the 2022 Liga Sudamericana de Básquetbol, the second tier league in South America.

== Honours ==
=== National competitions ===
Baloncesto Profesional Colombiano

- Champions (9): 2018, 2019, 2020, 2021-I, 2021-II, 2022-I, 2022-II, 2023-II, 2024-I

=== International competitions ===
Liga Sudamericana de Básquetbol

- Third place (1): 2022

== Performance in international competitions ==
Thus far, the Titanes de Barranquilla has played in FIBA Americas administered competitions three times.

Key:

- GP: Games played
- W: Wins
- L: Losses

Season	Tier	League	Result	GP	W	L
2019	1	FIBA Americas League	Group Phase	3	1	2
2021	1	BCL Americas	Group Phase	6	2	4
2022	2	Liga Sudamericana de Básquetbol	Bronze	7	5	2
Overall	3 appearances			16	8	8

== Notable players ==
Note: Flags indicate national team eligibility at FIBA-sanctioned events. Players may hold other non-FIBA nationalities not displayed.

Criteria

To appear in this section a player must have either:

- Set a club record or won an individual award while at the club
- Played at least one official international match for their national team at any time
- Played at least one official NBA match at any time.

- (Colombia) Juan Palacios
- (Colombia) Romário Roque
- (Panama) Ernesto Oglivie
- (United States) Troy Jones
- (United States) Xavier Roberson
- (United States) Michael Sneed
- (Venezuela) Jesús Medina
