= Guerreros de Bogotá =

Guerreros de Bogota
Home	Away	Third

Guerreros de Bogota is a professional basketball club based in Bogotá, Colombia. The team currently plays in Baloncesto Profesional Colombiano. Immediately after its foundation in 2011 the team already reached the league's semifinals in 2011 and 2013. The team return to the tournament in 2013-II, where the team wins the championship.
