= Baloncesto Profesional Colombiano =

Professional basketball championship in Colombia

Liga Wplay de Baloncesto
- Sport: Basketball
- Founded: 1988
- First season: 1988
- No. of teams: 8
- Country: Colombia
- Continent: FIBA Americas (Americas)
- Most recent champion: Toros del Valle (1st title) (Apertura 2026)
- Most titles: Titanes de Barranquilla (9 titles)
- Broadcasters: DirecTV, Canal Capital, Canal 13, Telecaribe, Telepacífico, TRO, Teleantioquia, Telecafé, Teleislas

Baloncesto Profesional Colombiano (Professional Colombian Basketball), currently known as the Liga WPlay de Baloncesto for sponsorship reasons, is the premier professional basketball championship in Colombia.

The championship was established in 1992 and is organized by the Federación Colombiana de Baloncesto (in English: Colombian Basketball Federation). The first national semi-professional championship was called Copa Sprite, sponsored by the eponymous soda trademark. This led the participating clubs to the creation of the División Mayor del Baloncesto Colombiano. This way the first championship was created, called Copa Sprite Profesional. In this version the following teams participated: Bogotá-Doria Promasa, Valle-Sensus 2, Antioquia-Sprite, Santander-Terpel, Barranquilla-Junior y Caldas-Ron Viejo de Caldas.

== League format ==
The championship consists of three rounds:

- Round Robin: The teams play 24 games each. The four top teams in the end reach the playoffs.
- The playoffs: in a best-of-7 format, the first seed plays against the fourth, and the second seed against the third. The two winning teams play the finals.
- The Finals: The two finalist teams play a best-of-seven-games series.

== Teams ==
=== Current teams ===
The following teams played in the 2025 season:

Team	City	Arena	Capacity
Caimanes del Llano	Villavicencio	Coliseo Álvaro Mesa Amaya	7,000
Caribbean Storm Llaneros	Villavicencio	Coliseo Álvaro Mesa Amaya	7,000
Cimarrones del Chocó	Quibdó	Coliseo "La Caldera"	4,000
Motilones del Norte	Cúcuta	Coliseo Toto Hernández	5,000
Paisas Basketball	Medellín	Coliseo Iván de Bedout	6,000
Piratas de Bogotá	Bogotá	Coliseo El Salitre	7,000
Sabios de Manizales	Manizales	Coliseo Jorge Arango Uribe	5,000
Toros del Valle	Cali	Coliseo Evangelista Mora	3,500

titanes are back

=== Former teams ===
Team	City	Arena	Capacity
Águilas	Tunja	Coliseo Municipal de Tunja	2,500
Bambuqueros	Neiva	Coliseo Álvaro Sánchez Silva	5,000
Búcaros	Bucaramanga	Coliseo Vicente Díaz Romero	5,000
Caimanes	Barranquilla	Coliseo Elías Chegwin	5,000
Caribbean Heat	San Andrés	Coliseo Genie Bay	5,000
Cimarrones	Quibdó	Coliseo Municipal de Quibdó	4,000
Cóndores	Tocancipá	Coliseo Municipal de Tocancipá	4,000
Corsarios	Cartagena	Coliseo Bernardo Caraballo	1,778
Cangrejeros	Cartagena	Coliseo Bernardo Caraballo	5,000
Guerreros	Bogotá	Coliseo El Salitre	7,000
Indervalle	Cali	Coliseo Evangelista Mora	3,340
Islanders	San Andrés	Coliseo de San Luis	3,000
Halcones	Cúcuta	Coliseo Toto Hernández	5,000
Llaneros	Villavicencio	Coliseo Alvaro Mesa Amaya	4,000
Los Pastos	Pasto	Coliseo Sergio Antonio Ruano	4,000
Marinos	Cartagena	Coliseo Bernardo Caraballo	5,000
Once Caldas	Manizales	Coliseo Jorge Arango Uribe	5,000
Centauros	Villavicencio	Coliseo Alvaro Mesa Amaya	4,000
Expreso Azul	Sibaté	Coliseo XIUA	3,000
Patriotas	Tunja	Coliseo Municipal de Tunja	2,500
Piratas	Bogotá	Coliseo El Salitre	7,000
Pijaos	Ibagué	Coliseo Enrique Triana Castilla	3,000
Titanes	Barranquilla	Coliseo Elías Chegwin	3,000

== Champions list ==
=== Semi-professional era (1988–1991) ===
Year	Champion	Tournament
1988	Cali Sport - JGB	I Copa Sprite
1989	Caldas Bancafetero Aces	II Copa Sprite
1990	Antioquia - Sprite	III Copa Sprite
1991	Valle - Sensus	IV Copa Sprite

=== Profesional era (1992–present) ===
Year	Champion	Runners-up
1992	Valle - Sensus	
1993	Paisas - Pilsen	
1994	Leopardos de Bucaramanga	
1995	Caimanes de Barranquilla	
1996	Paisas - Pilsen (2)	
1997	Caimanes de Barranquilla (2)	
1998	Caimanes de Barranquilla (3)	
1999	Piratas de Bogotá	
2000	Sabios de Caldas	
2001	Paisas - Pilsen (3)	
2002	Cancelled	
2003	Piratas de Bogotá (2)	
2004	Piratas de Bogotá (3)	
2005	Cancelled	
2006	Búcaros de Santander	
2007	Búcaros de Santander	
2008	Cúcuta-Norte	
2009	Cúcuta-Norte	
2010	Arrieros de Antioquia	
2011	Búcaros de Santander	
2012	Búcaros de Santander	
Apertura 2013	Bambuqueros de Neiva	
Clausura 2013	Guerreros de Bogotá	
Apertura 2014	Cimarrones de Choco	
Clausura 2014	Piratas de Bogotá (4)	
Apertura 2015	Aguilas de Tunja	Academia de La Montana
Clausura 2015	Búcaros de Bucaramanga	Piratas de Bogotá
2016	Academia de la Montaña	Búcaros de Bucaramanga
2017	Cimarrones del Choco (2)	Fast Break del Valle Bogota
2018	Titanes de Barranquilla (1)	San Andrés Warriors
2019	Titanes de Barranquilla (2)	Fast Break del Valle Bogota
2020	Titanes de Barranquilla (3)	Team Cali
Apertura 2021	Titanes de Barranquilla (4)	Tigrillos Medellín
Clausura 2021	Titanes de Barranquilla (5)	Cimarrone del Choco
Apertura 2022	Titanes de Barranquilla (6)	Cafeteros de Armenia
Clausura 2022	Titanes de Barranquilla (7)	Caribbean Storm Islands
Apertura 2023	Caribbean Storm Islands (1)	Cafeteros de Armenia
Clausura 2023	Titanes de Barranquilla (8)	Cafeteros de Armenia
Apertura 2024	Titanes de Barranquilla (9)	Toros del Valle
Clausura 2024	Motilones del Norte	Caribbean Storm Islands
Apertura 2025	Paisas Basketball	Caimanes del Llano
Clausura 2025	Paisas Basketball (2)	Cimarrones del Chocó
Apertura 2026	Toros del Valle	Paisas Basketball
