= 2024 Centrobasket Women =

Tournament details
- Host country: Mexico
- City: Irapuato
- Dates: 5–10 November
- Teams: 8 (from 1 confederation)
- Venue: 1 (in 1 host city)

Final positions
- Champions: Puerto Rico (5th title)
- Runners-up: Dominican Republic
- Third place: Mexico
- Fourth place: El Salvador

Tournament statistics
- Games played: 20
- Attendance: 8,323 (416 per game)
- Top scorer: (Puerto Rico) Arella Guirantes (31.8 ppg)

Official website
- FIBA

The 2024 Centrobasket Women was the 24th edition of the tournament. Eight teams featured in the competition, held in Irapuato, Mexico from 5 to 10 November 2024. The top four teams qualified for the 2025 FIBA Women's AmeriCup.

Puerto Rico won their fourth consecutive and fifth overall title after defeating the Dominican Republic in the final.

== Preliminary round ==
=== Group A ===
Pos	Team	Pld	W	L	PF	PA	PD	Pts	Qualification
1	Puerto Rico	3	3	0	230	172	+58	6	Semifinals
2	El Salvador	3	2	1	207	202	+5	5	Semifinals
3	Cuba	3	1	2	195	198	−3	4	5th–8th place semifinals
4	Costa Rica	3	0	3	135	195	−60	3	5th–8th place semifinals

Source: FIBA
Rules for classification: 1) Points; 2) Head-to-head results; 3) Points difference; 4) Points scored.

5 November 2024
12:30

Boxscore

El Salvador	73–82	Puerto Rico
Scoring by quarter: 18–26, 19–17, 18–18, 18–21
Pts: Campbell 29; Rebs: Martínez 12; Asts: Martínez 8		Pts: Guirantes 40; Rebs: Guirantes 10; Asts: Guirantes 4

Inforum, Irapuato
Attendance: 76
Referees: Krishna Domínguez (MEX), Aline García (URU), Luis Escobedo (MEX)

5 November 2024
15:00

Boxscore

Cuba	62–49	Costa Rica
Scoring by quarter: 18–17, 19–9, 13–10, 12–13
Pts: Galindo 14; Rebs: Galindo 10; Asts: Montero 5		Pts: Mora 15; Rebs: Araya 6 Asts: Alfaro, Sánchez 3

Inforum, Irapuato
Attendance: 203
Referees: Orlando Varela (HON), Mario Pallares (COL), Carla Peña (DOM)

6 November 2024
12:30

Boxscore

Costa Rica	53–64	El Salvador
Scoring by quarter: 13–16, 9–20, 12–16, 19–12
Pts: Mora 18; Rebs: Mora, Sánchez 5 Asts: Araya 3		Pts: Martínez 21; Rebs: Martínez 9 Asts: Martínez 8

Inforum, Irapuato
Attendance: 243
Referees: Carlos Vélez (COL), Luis Escobedo (MEX), Carla Peña (DOM)

6 November 2024
15:00

Boxscore

Puerto Rico	79–66	Cuba
Scoring by quarter: 27–15, 16–27, 17–17, 19–7
Pts: Guirantes 24; Rebs: Meléndez 9 Asts: Guirantes 8		Pts: Montero 16; Rebs: Galindo 8 Asts: Montero 6

Inforum, Irapuato
Attendance: 128
Referees: Krishna Domínguez (MEX), Aline García (URU), Nicolas Zivieri (BRA)

7 November 2024
12:30

Boxscore

Costa Rica	33–69	Puerto Rico
Scoring by quarter: 5–13, 10–12, 11–21, 7–23
Pts: Araya 12; Rebs: Mora 8 Asts: Fernández 22		Pts: Meléndez 12; Rebs: Pagan, Rios 8 Asts: Rios 6

Inforum, Irapuato
Attendance: 108
Referees: Orlando Varela (HON), Romina Morales (ARG), Luis Escobedo (MEX)

7 November 2024
15:00

Boxscore

El Salvador	70–67	Cuba
Scoring by quarter: 14–29, 20–12, 19–14, 17–12
Pts: Martínez 24; Rebs: Campbell, Martínez 8 Asts: Martínez 8		Pts: Montero 18; Rebs: Vargas 15; Asts: Montero 6

Inforum, Irapuato
Attendance: 226
Referees: Krishna Domínguez (MEX), Aline García (URU), Carla Peña (DOM)

=== Group B ===
Pos	Team	Pld	W	L	PF	PA	PD	Pts	Qualification
1	Dominican Republic	3	3	0	289	196	+93	6	Semifinals
2	Mexico (H)	3	2	1	261	166	+95	5	Semifinals
3	Virgin Islands	3	1	2	232	238	−6	4	5th–8th place semifinals
4	Guatemala	3	0	3	130	312	−182	3	5th–8th place semifinals

Source: FIBA
Rules for classification: 1) Points; 2) Head-to-head results; 3) Points difference; 4) Points scored.
(H) Hosts

5 November 2024
17:30

Boxscore

Virgin Islands	88–95 (OT)	Dominican Republic
Scoring by quarter: 21–25, 26–22, 17–19, 17–15, Overtime: 7–14
Pts: George 24; Rebs: George 13; Asts: Bough, Jones 5		Pts: Capellan 26; Rebs: Capellan 10; Asts: Jiménez 5

Inforum, Irapuato
Attendance: 145
Referees: Carlos Vélez (COL), Romina Morales (ARG), Mario Granados (ESA)

5 November 2024
20:00

Boxscore

Guatemala	31–109	Mexico
Scoring by quarter: 10–24, 11–38, 6–24, 4–23
Pts: García 17; Rebs: Aranki 7 Asts: García 2		Pts: Gil 17; Rebs: Ramos, Soto 8 Asts: Jeffreis 8

Inforum, Irapuato
Attendance: 1,263
Referees: Roberto Fernández (CRC), Nicolas Zivieri (BRA), Rebeca Davila (PUR)

6 November 2024
17:30

Boxscore

Dominican Republic	116–41	Guatemala
Scoring by quarter: 25–12, 35–12, 24–7, 32–10
Pts: Martínez 24; Rebs: Martínez 15; Asts: Martínez 10		Pts: García, Pérez 11; Rebs: Pérez 9 Asts: four players 1

Inforum, Irapuato
Attendance: 463
Referees: Roberto Fernández (CRC), Mario Granados (ESA), Romina Morales (ARG)

6 November 2024
20:00

Boxscore

Mexico	85–57	Virgin Islands
Scoring by quarter: 20–14, 21–20, 18–14, 26–9
Pts: Ramírez 21; Rebs: Lara 10; Asts: Ramírez 8		Pts: George 17; Rebs: Tate 11; Asts: Bough 5

Inforum, Irapuato
Attendance: 397
Referees: Orlando Varela (HON), Mario Pallares (COL), Rebeca Davila (PUR)

7 November 2024
17:30

Boxscore

Virgin Islands	87–58	Guatemala
Scoring by quarter: 25–16, 22–11, 22–13, 18–18
Pts: George 18; Rebs: George 13; Asts: Bough 5		Pts: García 18; Rebs: Aranki 10; Asts: García 8

Inforum, Irapuato
Attendance: 197
Referees: Carlos Vélez (COL), Rebeca Davila (PUR), Mario Granados (ESA)

7 November 2024
20:00

Boxscore

Mexico	67–78	Dominican Republic
Scoring by quarter: 15–19, 14–9, 23–19, 15–31
Pts: Rodríguez 17; Rebs: Lagunas 11; Asts: Ramírez 9		Pts: Capellan 29; Rebs: Martínez 14; Asts: Jiménez 5

Inforum, Irapuato
Attendance: 1,238
Referees: Roberto Fernández (CRC), Nicolas Zivieri (BRA), Mario Pallares (COL)

== Knockout stage ==
=== Classification round ===
5–8th place semifinals
A3 Cuba	94
B4 Guatemala	42
B3 Virgin Islands	81
A4 Costa Rica	47

Fifth place game
Cuba	75
Virgin Islands	80
Seventh place game
Guatemala	39
Costa Rica	55

==== 5–8th place semifinals ====
9 November 2024
12:30

Boxscore

Cuba	94–42	Guatemala
Scoring by quarter: 29–16, 18–16, 23–2, 24–8
Pts: Galindo 22; Rebs: Vargas 16; Asts: Montero 8		Pts: García 11; Rebs: Zuñiga 5 Asts: Charles, García 5

Inforum, Irapuato
Attendance: 56
Referees: Mario Granados (ESA), Rebeca Davila (PUR), Luis Escobedo (MEX)

9 November 2024
15:00

Boxscore

Virgin Islands	81–47	Costa Rica
Scoring by quarter: 30–6, 11–11, 22–10, 18–20
Pts: Tate 15; Rebs: Jones 8 Asts: Bough 6		Pts: Fernández 9 Rebs: Fernández, Herrera 5 Asts: three players 2

Inforum, Irapuato
Attendance: 48
Referees: Krishna Domínguez (MEX), Romina Morales (ARG), Carla Peña (DOM)

==== Seventh place game ====
10 November 2024
12:30

Boxscore

Guatemala	39–55	Costa Rica
Scoring by quarter: 14–12, 11–16, 4–17, 10–10
Pts: García 13; Rebs: Aranki 22; Asts: García 5		Pts: Mora 14; Rebs: Mora 13; Asts: Mora 6

Inforum, Irapuato
Attendance: 6
Referees: Mario Granados (ESA), Luis Escobedo (MEX), Carla Peña (DOM)

==== Fifth place game ====
10 November 2024
15:00

Boxscore

Cuba	75–80	Virgin Islands
Scoring by quarter: 15–27, 24–22, 19–20, 17–11
Pts: Montero 16; Rebs: Contreras 9 Asts: Montero 10		Pts: George 19; Rebs: George 11; Asts: Bough, Tate 5

Inforum, Irapuato
Attendance: 102
Referees: Aline García (URU), Romina Morales (ARG), Rebeca Davila (PUR)

=== Final round ===
Semifinals
A1 Puerto Rico	84
B2 Mexico	75
B1 Dominican Republic	85
A2 El Salvador	65

Final
Puerto Rico	95
Dominican Republic	81
Third place game
Mexico	84
El Salvador	64

==== Semifinals ====
9 November 2024
17:30

Boxscore

Dominican Republic	85–65	El Salvador
Scoring by quarter: 22–15, 20–23, 18–15, 24–22
Pts: Guirantes, Smith 23; Rebs: Jones 12; Asts: Guirantes 6		Pts: Ramírez 22; Rebs: Jeffreis 10; Asts: Ramírez 7

Inforum, Irapuato
Attendance: 567
Referees: Carlos Vélez (COL), José Fernández (CRC), Mario Pallares (COL)

9 November 2024
20:00

Boxscore

Puerto Rico	84–75	Mexico
Scoring by quarter: 27–26, 25–18, 23–9, 10–12
Pts: Martínez 27; Rebs: Martínez 12; Asts: Jiménez 7		Pts: Martínez 20; Rebs: Martínez 8 Asts: Martínez 4

Inforum, Irapuato
Attendance: 948
Referees: Orlando Varela (HON), Nicolas Zivieri (BRA), Aline García (URU)

==== Third place game ====
10 November 2024
17:30

Boxscore

Mexico	84–64	El Salvador
Scoring by quarter: 20–17, 24–22, 14–12, 26–13
Pts: Ramírez 22; Rebs: Jeffreis 19; Asts: Ramírez 9		Pts: Martínez 21; Rebs: three players 6 Asts: Martínez 6

Inforum, Irapuato
Attendance: 427
Referees: Roberto Fernández (CRC), Carlos Vélez (COL), Mario Pallares (COL)

==== Final ====
10 November 2024
20:00

Boxscore

Puerto Rico	95–81	Dominican Republic
Scoring by quarter: 31–13, 26–24, 16–25, 22–19
Pts: Guirantes 40; Rebs: Benítez, Guirantes 6 Asts: Guirantes 8		Pts: Capellan 26; Rebs: Martínez 10; Asts: Morton 5

Inforum, Irapuato
Attendance: 1,482
Referees: Krishna Domínguez (MEX), Orlando Varela (HON), Nicolas Zivieri (BRA)

== Final standings ==
Rank	Team	Record
1st place, gold medalist(s)	Puerto Rico	5–0
2nd place, silver medalist(s)	Dominican Republic	4–1
3rd place, bronze medalist(s)	Mexico	3–2
4	El Salvador	2–3
5	Virgin Islands	3–2
6	Cuba	2–3
7	Costa Rica	1–4
8	Guatemala	0–5

Qualified for the 2025 FIBA Women's AmeriCup
