= Centrobasket =

FIBA-sponsored international basketball tournament

- Sport: Basketball
- Founded: 1965
- First season: 1965
- No. of teams: 10
- Country: FIBA Americas member nations
- Continent: FIBA Americas (Americas)
- Most recent champions: M: Puerto Rico (11th title); W: Puerto Rico (5th title)
- Most titles: M: Puerto Rico (11 titles); W: Cuba (16 titles)
- Qualification: FIBA COCABA Championship; FIBA CBC Championship
- Related competitions: FIBA AmeriCup
- Website: FIBA Americas website

The Centrobasket is a FIBA-sponsored international basketball tournament where national teams from Central America and the Caribbean participate. These countries make up the Central American and Caribbean Basketball Confederation (CONCENCABA). The top three or four Women's National teams typically earn berths to the FIBA Women's AmeriCup, from which they can qualify for the FIBA Basketball World Cup or Summer Olympics. Teams qualify for these tournaments by finishing high (usually first or second place) in the previous Centrobasket or by placing high at the FIBA COCABA Championship for Mexico and the seven Central American countries and at the FIBA CBC Championship for the 23 Caribbean countries. In total, 31 countries have an opportunity to qualify their national teams for Centrobasket, yet all of them do not enter teams regularly.

== History ==
The tournament is typically held every two years. Initially played in odd-numbered years, it transitioned to even-numbered years starting in 2004. The event was not held in 1979 or 1983, but with those exceptions, it has occurred biennially, including consecutive editions in 2003 and 2004 due to the calendar change.

The tournament features eight teams, divided into two groups. The first round follows a round-robin format, after which teams compete in classification matches to determine final standings.

Puerto Rico and Panama are historically the most successful teams in the competition. Although Puerto Rico often fields a secondary squad, it has consistently earned medals in nearly every edition it has entered.

== Men's tournament ==
=== Summary ===
Year	Hosts	Gold medal game			Bronze medal game		
Year	Hosts	Gold	Score	Silver	Bronze	Score	Fourth place
1965; Details	Mexico (Mexico City)	Mexico	Round robin	Puerto Rico	Cuba	Round robin	Panama
1967; Details	El Salvador (San Salvador)	Panama	Round robin	Cuba	Virgin Islands	Round robin	Mexico
1969; Details	Cuba (Havana)	Panama	Round robin	Cuba	Puerto Rico	Round robin	Venezuela
1971; Details	Venezuela (Valencia & Caracas)	Cuba	Round robin	Puerto Rico	Venezuela	Round robin	Dominican Republic
1973; Details	Puerto Rico (San Juan)	Puerto Rico	Round robin	Mexico	Cuba	Round robin	Panama
1975; Details	Dominican Republic (Santo Domingo)	Mexico	Round robin	Puerto Rico	Cuba	Round robin	Dominican Republic
1977; Details	Panama (Panama City)	Dominican Republic	Round robin	Puerto Rico	Panama	Round robin	Mexico
1981; Details	Puerto Rico (San Juan)	Panama	82–76	Puerto Rico	Cuba	Round robin	Mexico
1985; Details	Mexico (Mexico City)	Puerto Rico	Round robin	Panama	Cuba	Round robin	Mexico
1987; Details	Dominican Republic (Santo Domingo)	Puerto Rico	98–85	Panama	Mexico	90–87	Dominican Republic
1989; Details	Cuba (Havana)	Puerto Rico	116–83	Panama	Cuba	94–79	Mexico
1991; Details	Mexico (Monterrey)	Puerto Rico	99–82	Mexico	Cuba	108–87	Panama
1993; Details	Puerto Rico (Ponce)	Puerto Rico	87–77	Cuba	Panama	96–83	Dominican Republic
1995; Details	Dominican Republic (Santo Domingo)	Cuba	85–68	Dominican Republic	Puerto Rico	95–88	Panama
1997; Details	Honduras (Tegucigalpa)	Cuba	106–93	Puerto Rico	Dominican Republic	92–75	Mexico
1999; Details	Cuba Puerto Rico (Havana & San Juan)	Cuba	67–63	Puerto Rico	Dominican Republic	86–74	Panama
2001; Details	Mexico (Toluca)	Puerto Rico	86–73	Mexico	Panama	93–82	Virgin Islands
2003; Details	Mexico (Culiacán)	Puerto Rico	92–83	Dominican Republic	Mexico	78–76	Virgin Islands
2004; Details	Dominican Republic (Santo Domingo)	Dominican Republic	75–74	Puerto Rico	Panama	98–89	Mexico
2006; Details	Panama (Panama City)	Panama	73–59	Virgin Islands	Puerto Rico	93–83	Mexico
2008; Details	Mexico (Chetumal & Cancún)	Puerto Rico	87–70	Virgin Islands	Dominican Republic	102–74	Cuba
2010; Details	Dominican Republic (Santo Domingo)	Puerto Rico	89–80	Dominican Republic	Panama	75–74	Cuba
2012; Details	Puerto Rico (Hato Rey)	Dominican Republic	80–72	Puerto Rico	Jamaica	78–54	Panama
2014; Details	Mexico (Tepic)	Mexico	74–60	Puerto Rico	Dominican Republic	75–66	Cuba
2016; Details	Panama (Panama City)	Puerto Rico	84–83	Mexico	Dominican Republic	64–48	Panama

=== Performances by nation ===
Rank	Nation	Gold	Silver	Bronze	Total
1	Puerto Rico	11	10	3	24
2	Cuba	4	3	7	14
3	Panama	4	3	5	12
4	Mexico	3	4	2	9
5	Dominican Republic	3	3	5	11
6	Virgin Islands	0	2	1	3
7	Jamaica	0	0	1	1
7	Venezuela	0	0	1	1
Totals (8 entries)		25	25	25	75

=== Participation details ===
Team	(Mexico) 1965	(El Salvador) 1967	(Cuba) 1969	(Venezuela) 1971	(Puerto Rico) 1973	(Dominican Republic) 1975	(Panama) 1977	(Puerto Rico) 1981	(Mexico) 1985	(Dominican Republic) 1987	(Cuba) 1989	(Mexico) 1991	(Puerto Rico) 1993	(Dominican Republic) 1995	(Honduras) 1997	(Cuba) 1999	(Mexico) 2001	(Mexico) 2003	(Dominican Republic) 2004	(Panama) 2006	(Mexico) 2008	(Dominican Republic) 2010	(Puerto Rico) 2012	(Mexico) 2014	(Panama) 2016	Total
Antigua and Barbuda	–	–	–	–	–	–	7th	–	–	–	–	–	–	–	–	–	–	7th	7th	–	–	–	–	–	10th	4
Bahamas	–	–	–	–	–	5th	–	–	8th	–	8th	–	–	5th	–	–	–	5th	–	–	–	–	5th	7th	7th	8
Barbados	–	–	–	–	–	–	–	–	–	–	–	–	–	6th	–	–	7th	–	6th	–	–	–	–	–	–	3
Belize	–	–	–	–	–	–	–	–	–	–	–	–	–	–	–	7th	–	–	–	–	–	7th	–	–	–	2
British Virgin Islands	–	–	–	–	–	–	–	–	–	–	–	–	–	–	–	–	–	–	–	–	–	8th	–	–	–	1
Costa Rica	–	–	–	–	–	–	–	–	–	–	7th	5th	–	7th	–	8th	–	8th	–	8th	8th	–	9th	9th	9th	10
Cuba	3rd	2nd	2nd	1st	3rd	3rd	–	3rd	3rd	5th	3rd	3rd	2nd	1st	1st	1st	6th	–	5th	6th	4th	4th	8th	4th	6th	23
Dominican Republic	–	–	5th	4th	7th	4th	1st	5th	6th	4th	5th	–	4th	2nd	3rd	3rd	5th	2nd	1st	5th	3rd	2nd	1st	3rd	3rd	22
El Salvador	–	5th	–	5th	–	–	5th	–	7th	–	10th	–	–	–	7th	–	–	–	–	–	7th	–	–	10th	–	8
Guatemala	–	6th	–	–	–	–	–	–	–	–	–	–	–	–	–	–	–	6th	8th	–	–	–	–	–	–	3
Guyana	–	–	–	7th	8th	–	–	–	–	–	–	–	–	–	–	–	–	–	–	–	–	–	–	–	–	2
Haiti	–	–	–	–	–	6th	–	8th	–	–	–	–	–	–	–	–	–	–	–	–	–	–	–	–	–	2
Honduras	–	7th	–	–	–	–	6th	–	9th	–	–	–	–	–	6th	–	8th	–	–	–	–	–	–	–	–	5
Jamaica	–	–	–	–	–	–	–	–	–	–	–	–	–	–	8th	–	–	–	–	7th	–	5th	3rd	8th	–	5
Mexico	1st	4th	–	–	2nd	1st	4th	4th	4th	3rd	4th	2nd	5th	–	4th	5th	2nd	3rd	4th	4th	5th	6th	6th	1st	2nd	22
Nicaragua	–	–	–	–	–	–	–	–	–	–	–	–	–	–	–	–	–	–	–	–	–	–	10th	–	8th	2
Panama	4th	1st	1st	–	4th	–	3rd	1st	2nd	2nd	2nd	4th	3rd	4th	–	4th	3rd	–	3rd	1st	6th	3rd	4th	5th	4th	21
Puerto Rico	2nd	–	3rd	2nd	1st	2nd	2nd	2nd	1st	1st	1st	1st	1st	3rd	2nd	2nd	1st	1st	2nd	3rd	1st	1st	2nd	2nd	1st	24
Trinidad and Tobago	–	–	–	6th	–	–	–	–	–	6th	9th	–	–	–	–	–	–	–	–	–	–	10th	–	–	–	4
Virgin Islands	5th	3rd	–	–	6th	–	–	7th	5th	–	6th	–	6th	–	5th	6th	4th	4th	–	2nd	2nd	9th	7th	6th	5th	17
Venezuela	–	–	4th	3rd	5th	–	–	6th	–	–	–	–	–	–	–	–	–	–	–	–	–	–	–	–	–	4
Total	5	7	5	7	8	6	7	8	9	6	10	5	6	7	8	8	8	8	8	8	8	10	10	10	10	

== Women's tournament ==
=== Summary ===
Year	Hosts	Gold medal game			Bronze medal game		
Year	Hosts	Gold	Score	Silver	Bronze	Score	Fourth place
1971; Details	Venezuela (Caracas)	Cuba	Round robin	Mexico	Venezuela	Round robin	Trinidad and Tobago
1973; Details	Mexico (Veracruz)	Mexico	Round robin	Cuba	Puerto Rico	Round robin	Dominican Republic
1975; Details	Dominican Republic (Santo Domingo)	Cuba	Round robin	Mexico	Dominican Republic	Round robin	El Salvador
1977; Details	Panama (Panama City)	Mexico	Round robin	Dominican Republic	Puerto Rico	Round robin	Panama
1981; Details	Puerto Rico (San Juan)	Cuba	Round robin	Mexico	Puerto Rico	Round robin	Dominican Republic
1985; Details	Mexico (Puebla)	Cuba	Round robin	Mexico	Dominican Republic	Round robin	Puerto Rico
1989; Details	Cuba (Havana)	Cuba	126–53	Dominican Republic	Mexico	75–60	Puerto Rico
1993; Details	Puerto Rico (Ponce)	Cuba	91–57	Mexico	Puerto Rico	–	Dominican Republic
1995; Details	Dominican Republic (Santo Domingo)	Cuba	–	Puerto Rico	Dominican Republic	–	?
1997; Details	Honduras (Tegucigalpa)	Cuba	105–69	Puerto Rico	Dominican Republic	86–65	Mexico
1999; Details	Cuba (Havana)	Cuba	117–61	Dominican Republic	Mexico	63–59	Puerto Rico
2001; Details	Dominican Republic (Santo Domingo)	Cuba	–	Mexico	Dominican Republic	–	Puerto Rico
2003; Details	Mexico (León)	Cuba	101–68	Dominican Republic	Puerto Rico	79–69	Mexico
2004; Details	Guatemala (Guatemala City)	Cuba	118–65	Puerto Rico	Guatemala	71–53	Costa Rica
2006; Details	Mexico (Mexico City)	Cuba	116–73	Mexico	Jamaica	71–67	Puerto Rico
2008; Details	Puerto Rico (Morovis)	Cuba	85–67	Puerto Rico	Dominican Republic	81–73	Mexico
2010; Details	Puerto Rico (Mayagüez)	Puerto Rico	72–48	Jamaica	Mexico	78–65	Trinidad and Tobago
2012; Details	Puerto Rico (Morovis)	Cuba	78–63	Puerto Rico	Dominican Republic	79–78	Mexico
2014; Details	Mexico (Monterrey)	Cuba	58–47	Puerto Rico	Dominican Republic	61–55	Virgin Islands
2017; Details	United States Virgin Islands (Saint Thomas)	Virgin Islands	Round robin	Mexico	Puerto Rico	Round robin	Jamaica
2018; Details	Puerto Rico (Manati)	Puerto Rico	83–54	Cuba	Mexico	85–81	Dominican Republic
2021; Details	El Salvador (San Salvador)	Puerto Rico	Round robin	Virgin Islands	Dominican Republic	Round robin	El Salvador
2022; Details	Mexico (Chihuahua)	Puerto Rico	88–65	Mexico	Cuba	73–59	Dominican Republic
2024; Details	Mexico (Irapuato)	Puerto Rico	95–81	Dominican Republic	Mexico	84–64	El Salvador
2026; Details	Nicaragua (Managua)	Puerto Rico	82–68	Mexico	Dominican Republic	102–69	Virgin Islands

=== Performances by nation ===
Rank	Nation	Gold	Silver	Bronze	Total
1	Cuba	16	2	1	19
2	Puerto Rico	6	6	6	18
3	Mexico	2	10	5	17
4	Virgin Islands	1	1	0	2
5	Dominican Republic	0	5	10	15
6	Jamaica	0	1	1	2
7	Guatemala	0	0	1	1
7	Venezuela	0	0	1	1
Totals (8 entries)		25	25	25	75
