= Mónica Malavassi =

Costa Rican basketball player and former footballer (born 1989)

Personal information
- Born: 25 April 1989 (age 37) San José, Costa Rica
- Listed height: 1.58 m (5 ft 2 in)
- Position: Point guard

Mónica Malavassi
Personal information
- Full name: Mónica Malavassi Álvarez
- Position: Forward

Senior career*
| Years | Team | Apps | (Gls) |
- Arenal

International career^{‡}
| 2008 | Costa Rica U20 | | |
| 2010 | Costa Rica | 4 | (0) |
- * Club domestic league appearances and goals ‡ National team caps and goals as of 8 November 2010

Mónica Malavassi Álvarez (born 25 April 1989) is a Costa Rican basketball player who plays as a point guard and a former footballer who played as a forward. She has played for both the Costa Rica women's national basketball team and the Costa Rica women's national football team. She is currently the president and owner of FC Moravia FCM

== Basketball career ==
=== International career ===
Malavassi played for Costa Rica at three Centrobasket Women editions (2006, 2008 and 2018) and the 2014 Central American and Caribbean Games.

== Football career ==
=== Club career ===
Malavassi has played in her country for Arenal.

=== International career ===
Malavassi has represented Costa Rica at the 2008 CONCACAF Women's U-20 Championship. She capped at senior level during the 2010 CONCACAF Women's World Cup Qualifying.
