= 2022 Centrobasket Women =

2022 FIBA Women's Centrobasket
23rd Women's Central American and Caribbean Basketball Championship

Tournament details
- Host country: Mexico
- City: Chihuahua City
- Dates: 23–27 November 2022
- Teams: 7 (from 1 confederation)
- Venue: 1 (in 1 host city)

Final positions
- Champions: Puerto Rico (4th title)
- Runners-up: Mexico
- Third place: Cuba

Tournament statistics
- MVP: (Puerto Rico) Arella Guirantes
- Top scorer: (Puerto Rico) Arella Guirantes (24.0)
- Top rebounds: (Cuba) Nahomis Vargas (9.3)
- Top assists: (El Salvador) Hillary Martinez (6.0)
- PPG (Team): Puerto Rico (92.8)
- RPG (Team): Dominican Republic (43.9)
- APG (Team): Puerto Rico (23.6)

Official website
- www.fiba.basketball

The 2022 Centrobasket Women was the 23rd edition of the women's Centrobasket. The tournament was held in the city of Chihuahua, Mexico, from 23 to 27 November 2022. Puerto Rico won their fourth overall title.

== Group stage ==
In this round, the teams were drawn into two groups of three and four teams; each group played a round-robin. The top two teams in each group advanced to the championship round, consisting of semifinals, a bronze medal game, and a gold medal game. Semifinalists also qualify for the 2019 FIBA Women's AmeriCup.

All times are local (Central Zone – UTC-6).

=== Group A ===
Pos	Team	Pld	W	L	PF	PA	PD	Pts	Qualification
1	Puerto Rico	3	3	0	273	183	+90	6	Semifinals
2	Dominican Republic	3	2	1	235	183	+52	5	Semifinals
3	Guatemala	3	1	2	197	254	−57	4	5th–7th place playoffs
4	Costa Rica	3	0	3	159	244	−85	3	5th–7th place playoffs

Source: FIBA

23 November 2022
14:00

Boxscore

Costa Rica	39–75	Dominican Republic
Scoring by quarter: 14–15, 17–24, 3–20, 5–16
Pts: Fernandez 9 Rebs: Castro 5 Asts: Castro 3		Pts: Morton 15; Rebs: Evangelista 11; Asts: Morton 5

Estadio Rodrigo M. Quevedo, Chihuahua
Referees: Joaquin Krishna Dominguez Viveros (MEX), Ricardo Hayles (JAM), Christian Wilmore (BAH)

23 November 2022
17:00

Boxscore

Guatemala	57–100	Puerto Rico
Scoring by quarter: 19–21, 18–25, 9–34, 11–20
Pts: Vallecillo 19; Rebs: Vasquez 6 Asts: Vallecillo 3		Pts: Guirantes 21; Rebs: Roma 9 Asts: Guirantes 6

Estadio Rodrigo M. Quevedo, Chihuahua
Referees: Jose Orlando Varela Diaz (HON), Kelsey Kisilevich (CAN), Juan Fabian Valenzuela Estrada (MEX)

24 November 2022
14:00

Boxscore

Dominican Republic	92–57	Guatemala
Scoring by quarter: 24–12, 25–18, 27–12, 16–15
Pts: Evangelista 15; Rebs: Morton 10; Asts: Colome 6		Pts: Pinelo 15; Rebs: Vasquez 6 Asts: Rosales 3

Estadio Rodrigo M. Quevedo, Chihuahua
Referees: Kelsey Kisilevich (CAN), Juan Fabian Valenzuela Estrada (MEX), Mario Antonio Granados Santos (ESA)

24 November 2022
17:00

Boxscore

Puerto Rico	86–58	Costa Rica
Scoring by quarter: 24–9, 19–13, 29–18, 14–18
Pts: Guirantes 20; Rebs: O'Neill 7 Asts: Guirantes 5		Pts: Matamoros 15; Rebs: Matamoros 10; Asts: Fernandez 3

Estadio Rodrigo M. Quevedo, Chihuahua
Referees: Joaquin Krishna Dominguez Viveros (MEX), Jose Orlando Varela Diaz (HON), Ricardo Hayles (JAM)

25 November 2022
14:00

Boxscore

Costa Rica	62–83	Guatemala
Scoring by quarter: 19–17, 16–21, 10–31, 17–14
Pts: Fernandez 12; Rebs: Castro 7 Asts: Torres 4		Pts: Vasquez 26; Rebs: Vasquez 11; Asts: Lopez 7

Estadio Rodrigo M. Quevedo, Chihuahua
Referees: Joaquin Krishna Dominguez Viveros (MEX), Jose Orlando Varela Diaz (HON), Mario Antonio Granados Santos (ESA)

25 November 2022
20:00

Boxscore

Puerto Rico	87–68	Dominican Republic
Scoring by quarter: 27–17, 17–13, 33–18, 10–20
Pts: Guirantes 31; Rebs: Quinones 10; Asts: Guirantes 9		Pts: Hernandez 15; Rebs: Reynoso 11; Asts: Morton 5

Estadio Rodrigo M. Quevedo, Chihuahua
Referees: Kelsey Kisilevich (CAN), Juan Fabian Valenzuela Estrada (MEX), Ricardo Hayles (JAM)

=== Group B ===
Pos	Team	Pld	W	L	PF	PA	PD	Pts	Qualification
1	Mexico (H)	2	2	0	129	107	+22	4	Semifinals
2	Cuba	2	1	1	125	116	+9	3	Semifinals
3	El Salvador	2	0	2	96	127	−31	2	5th–7th place playoffs

Source: FIBA
(H) Hosts

23 November 2022
20:00

Boxscore

Mexico	61–48	El Salvador
Scoring by quarter: 17–7, 10–13, 12–15, 22–13
Pts: Avila 11; Rebs: Lara 7 Asts: Avila 4		Pts: Martinez 20; Rebs: Martinez 7 Asts: Martinez 6

Estadio Rodrigo M. Quevedo, Chihuahua
Referees: Edwin Quiles Rodriguez (PUR), Mauricio Chinchilla Picado (CRC), Natalia Cuello Cuello (DOM)

24 November 2022
20:00

Boxscore

Cuba	59–68	Mexico
Scoring by quarter: 19–13, 8–16, 18–20, 14–19
Pts: Amargo 22; Rebs: Vargas 10; Asts: Tornell 4		Pts: Avila 18; Rebs: Luna 9 Asts: Beltran 4

Estadio Rodrigo M. Quevedo, Chihuahua
Referees: Edwin Quiles Rodriguez (PUR), Christian Wilmore (BAH), Natalia Cuello Cuello (DOM)

25 November 2022
17:00

Boxscore

El Salvador	48–66	Cuba
Scoring by quarter: 12–14, 17–24, 8–10, 11–18
Pts: Martinez 20; Rebs: Martinez 8 Asts: Calderon 3		Pts: Vargas 17; Rebs: Vargas 12; Asts: Tanis 5

Estadio Rodrigo M. Quevedo, Chihuahua
Referees: Edwin Quiles Rodriguez (PUR), Christian Wilmore (BAH), Natalia Cuello Cuello (DOM)

== 5th–7th place playoffs ==
5th–7th place semifinal
26 November 2022
El Salvador	73
Costa Rica	57

5th place match
27 November 2022
Guatemala	69
El Salvador	81

=== 5th–7th place semifinal ===
26 November 2022
14:00

Boxscore

El Salvador	73–57	Costa Rica
Scoring by quarter: 25–19, 19–14, 19–16, 10–8
Pts: Tevez 21; Rebs: Martinez 14; Asts: Martinez 9		Pts: Fernandez 12; Rebs: Matamoros 15; Asts: Castro 7

Estadio Rodrigo M. Quevedo, Chihuahua
Referees: Joaquin Krishna Dominguez Viveros (MEX), Edwin Quiles Rodriguez (PUR), Natalia Cuello Cuello (DOM)

=== 5th place match ===
27 November 2022
14:00

Boxscore

Guatemala	69–81	El Salvador
Scoring by quarter: 24–19, 13–19, 20–17, 12–26
Pts: Garcia 17; Rebs: Rivas 9 Asts: Garcia 7		Pts: Funes 21; Rebs: Martinez 6 Asts: Martinez 7

Estadio Rodrigo M. Quevedo, Chihuahua
Referees: Kelsey Kisilevich (CAN), Christian Wilmore (BAH), Mauricio Chinchilla Picado (CRC)

== Championship playoffs ==
Semifinals
26 November 2022
Puerto Rico	103
Cuba	66
26 November 2022
Mexico (OT)	97
Dominican Republic	95

Final
27 November 2022
Puerto Rico	88
Mexico	65
3rd place match
27 November 2022
Cuba	73
Dominican Republic	59

=== Semifinals ===
26 November 2022
17:00

Boxscore

Puerto Rico	103–66	Cuba
Scoring by quarter: 34–13, 33–22, 22–18, 14–13
Pts: Benitez 25; Rebs: Quinones 11; Asts: Roma 5		Pts: Vargas 19; Rebs: Vargas 9 Asts: Armentero 8

Estadio Rodrigo M. Quevedo, Chihuahua
Referees: Jose Orlando Varela Diaz (HON), Ricardo Hayles (JAM), Mauricio Chinchilla Picado (CRC)

26 November 2022
20:00

Boxscore

Mexico	97–95 (OT)	Dominican Republic
Scoring by quarter: 24–23, 23–25, 22–21, 18–18, Overtime: 10–8
Pts: Avila 27; Rebs: Lara 14; Asts: Avila 9		Pts: Morton 23; Rebs: Monsac 13; Asts: Monsac 4

Estadio Rodrigo M. Quevedo, Chihuahua
Referees: Kelsey Kisilevich (CAN), Christian Wilmore (BAH), Mario Antonio Granados Santos (ESA)

=== 3rd place match ===
27 November 2022
17:00

Boxscore

Cuba	73–59	Dominican Republic
Scoring by quarter: 14–23, 25–9, 12–13, 22–14
Pts: Tanis 25; Rebs: Jourdain 8 Asts: Armentero 10		Pts: Hernandez 14; Rebs: Jimenez 12; Asts: Evangelista 6

Estadio Rodrigo M. Quevedo, Chihuahua
Referees: Joaquin Krishna Dominguez Viveros (MEX), Edwin Quiles Rodriguez (PUR), Juan Fabian Valenzuela Estrada (MEX)

=== Final ===
27 November 2022
20:00

Boxscore

Puerto Rico	88–65	Mexico
Scoring by quarter: 26–20, 28–15, 15–15, 19–15
Pts: Guirantes 28; Rebs: Guirantes 14; Asts: O'Neill 9		Pts: Beltran 20; Rebs: Luna 9 Asts: Avila 5

Estadio Rodrigo M. Quevedo, Chihuahua
Referees: Jose Orlando Varela Diaz (HON), Ricardo Hayles (JAM), Natalia Cuello Cuello (DOM)

== Final standings ==
Rank	Team
1st place, gold medalist(s)	Puerto Rico
2nd place, silver medalist(s)	Mexico
3rd place, bronze medalist(s)	Cuba
4	Dominican Republic
5	El Salvador
6	Guatemala
7	Costa Rica

Qualified for the 2023 FIBA Women's AmeriCup
