= 2018 Centrobasket Women =

2018 FIBA Women's Centrobasket
21st Women's Central American and Caribbean Basketball Championship

Tournament details
- Host country: Puerto Rico
- City: Manatí
- Dates: 20–24 August 2018
- Teams: 7 (from 1 confederation)
- Venue: 1 (in 1 host city)

Final positions
- Champions: Puerto Rico (2nd title)
- Runners-up: Cuba
- Third place: Mexico

Tournament statistics
- MVP: (Puerto Rico) Jennifer O'Neill
- Top scorer: (Puerto Rico) O'Neill (19.0)
- Top rebounds: (Costa Rica) Matamoros (11.0)
- Top assists: (Cuba) Martínez (5.3)
- PPG (Team): Puerto Rico (86.8)
- RPG (Team): Dominican Republic (48.5)
- APG (Team): Puerto Rico (21.2)

Official website
- www.fiba.basketball

The 2018 Women's Centrobasket Championship was the 21st edition of the women's Centrobasket. It was held in the city of Manatí, Puerto Rico, from 20 to 24 August 2018. The tournament was scheduled to include eight teams, including the Virgin Islands, but they withdrew.

== Group stage ==
In this round, the teams were drawn into two groups of three and four teams; each group played a round-robin. The top two teams in each group advanced to the championship round, consisting of semifinals, a bronze medal game, and a gold medal game. Semifinalists also qualify for the 2019 FIBA Women's AmeriCup.

All times are local (Atlantic Time Zone – UTC-4).

=== Group A ===
Pos	Team	Pld	W	L	PF	PA	PD	Pts	Qualification
1	Cuba	2	2	0	184	91	+93	4	Semifinals
2	Dominican Republic	2	1	1	134	114	+20	3	Semifinals
3	Guatemala	2	0	2	68	181	−113	2	5th–7th place playoffs

Source: FIBA

20 August 2018
20:30

Boxscore

Guatemala	29–82	Dominican Republic
Scoring by quarter: 7–24, 11–25, 7–16, 4–17
Pts: Gonzalez 13; Rebs: López 8 Asts: Cano 2		Pts: Reynoso 20; Rebs: Reynoso 16; Asts: Morton 5

Coliseo Juan Aubin Cruz, Manatí
Referees: Hortencia Sánchez (MEX), José Fernández (CRC), Rebeca Dávila (PUR)

21 August 2018
20:30

Boxscore

Dominican Republic	52–85	Cuba
Scoring by quarter: 12–19, 14–18, 15–20, 11–28
Pts: Morton 18; Rebs: Monsac 8 Asts: Evangelista 5		Pts: Amargo 24; Rebs: Ávila 11; Asts: Martínez 8

Coliseo Juan Aubin Cruz, Manatí
Referees: Maripier Malo (CAN), Hortencia Sánchez (MEX), Christian Wilmore (BAH)

22 August 2018
16:00

Boxscore

Guatemala	39–99	Cuba
Scoring by quarter: 12–20, 14–28, 6–29, 7–22
Pts: González 14; Rebs: Cano 4 Asts: Rivas 4		Pts: Ávila 18; Rebs: Cepeda 7 Asts: Martínez, Ávila 6

Coliseo Juan Aubin Cruz, Manatí
Referees: José Fernández (CRC), Christian Wilmore (BAH), Rebeca Dávila (PUR)

=== Group B ===
Pos	Team	Pld	W	L	PF	PA	PD	Pts	Qualification
1	Puerto Rico	3	3	0	279	136	+143	6	Semifinals
2	Mexico	3	2	1	217	165	+52	5	Semifinals
3	Bahamas	3	1	2	162	226	−64	4	5th–7th place playoffs
4	Costa Rica	3	0	3	119	250	−131	3	5th–7th place playoffs

Source: FIBA

20 August 2018
16:00

Boxscore

Mexico	77–42	Costa Rica
Scoring by quarter: 23–7, 19–11, 17–14, 18–10
Pts: Luna 16; Rebs: Ávila, Valenzuela 7 Asts: Silva, Valenzuela 4		Pts: Matamoros 15; Rebs: Matamoros 12; Asts: Quesada 3

Coliseo Juan Aubin Cruz, Manatí
Referees: Maripier Malo (CAN), Natalia Cuello (DOM), Grant Todey (USA)

20 August 2018
18:30

Boxscore

Bahamas	50–95	Puerto Rico
Scoring by quarter: 10–30, 7–16, 17–22, 16–27
Pts: Grant 24; Rebs: Grant 6 Asts: Grant 10		Pts: three players 12; Rebs: Jones 7 Asts: Meléndez 5

Coliseo Juan Aubin Cruz, Manatí
Referees: Andreia Silva (BRA), Yuliet Méndez (CUB), Kendell Henry (ISV)

21 August 2018
16:00

Boxscore

Mexico	74–52	Bahamas
Scoring by quarter: 20–8, 14–18, 20–11, 20–15
Pts: Luna 18; Rebs: Valenzuela 11; Asts: Ávila 8		Pts: Grant 19; Rebs: Grant 15; Asts: Forbes 3

Coliseo Juan Aubin Cruz, Manatí
Referees: Andreia Silva (BRA), Norval Young (BVI), Grant Todey (USA)

21 August 2018
18:30

Boxscore

Costa Rica	20–113	Puerto Rico
Scoring by quarter: 0–33, 12–23, 5–29, 3–28
Pts: Jiménez, Malavassi 5 Rebs: Matamoros 5 Asts: four players 1		Pts: Jones 17; Rebs: Maldonado, Gwathmey 8 Asts: Rosado 9

Coliseo Juan Aubin Cruz, Manatí
Referees: Natalia Cuello (DOM), Gregory Hamilton (CAY), Yuliet Méndez (CUB)

22 August 2018
18:30

Boxscore

Puerto Rico	71–66	Mexico
Scoring by quarter: 15–13, 26–16, 15–18, 15–19
Pts: O'Neill 21; Rebs: O'Neill 12; Asts: Rosado 4		Pts: Silva, Ávila 16; Rebs: Silva 9 Asts: Pardo 5

Coliseo Juan Aubin Cruz, Manatí
Referees: Andreia Silva (BRA), Yuliet Méndez (CUB), Maripier Malo (CAN)

22 August 2018
20:30

Boxscore

Costa Rica	57–60	Bahamas
Scoring by quarter: 14–17, 8–15, 19–12, 16–16
Pts: Galvez 16; Rebs: Matamoros 8 Asts: Malavassi 5		Pts: Lewis 15; Rebs: Dean 7 Asts: Fernander 8

Coliseo Juan Aubin Cruz, Manatí
Referees: Hortencia Sánchez (MEX), Gregory Alexander (CAY), Norval Young (BVI)

== 5th–7th place playoffs ==
5th–7th place semifinal
23 August 2018
Guatemala	60
Costa Rica	62

5th place match
24 August 2018
Bahamas	55
Costa Rica	49

=== 5th–7th place semifinal ===
23 August 2018
16:00

Boxscore

Guatemala	60–62	Costa Rica
Scoring by quarter: 18–10, 17–13, 15–13, 10–26

Coliseo Juan Aubin Cruz, Manatí

=== 5th place match ===
24 August 2018
14:00

Boxscore

Bahamas	55–49	Costa Rica
Scoring by quarter: 13–7, 8–12, 14–21, 20–9

Coliseo Juan Aubin Cruz, Manatí

== Championship playoffs ==
Semifinals
23 August 2018
Cuba	86
Mexico	80
23 August 2018
Puerto Rico	72
Dominican Republic	56

Final
24 August 2018
Cuba	54
Puerto Rico	83
3rd place match
24 August 2018
Mexico	85
Dominican Republic	81

=== Semifinals ===
23 August 2018
18:30

Boxscore

Puerto Rico	72–56	Dominican Republic
Scoring by quarter: 14–15, 12–15, 20–13, 26–13

Coliseo Juan Aubin Cruz, Manatí

23 August 2018
20:30

Boxscore

Cuba	86–80	Mexico
Scoring by quarter: 16–9, 23–17, 26–26, 21–28

Coliseo Juan Aubin Cruz, Manatí

=== 3rd place match ===
24 August 2018
16:00

Boxscore

Mexico	85–81	Dominican Republic
Scoring by quarter: 23–13, 12–31, 20–17, 30–20

Coliseo Juan Aubin Cruz, Manatí

=== Final ===
24 August 2018
18:30

Boxscore

Cuba	54–83	Puerto Rico
Scoring by quarter: 11–18, 17–20, 15–21, 11–24

Coliseo Juan Aubin Cruz, Manatí

== Final standings ==
Rank	Team
1st place, gold medalist(s)	Puerto Rico
2nd place, silver medalist(s)	Cuba
3rd place, bronze medalist(s)	Mexico
4	Dominican Republic
5	Bahamas
6	Costa Rica
7	Guatemala

Qualified for the 2019 FIBA Women's AmeriCup
