= 2006 Centrobasket Women =

2006 FIBA Women's Centrobasket
15th Women's Central American and Caribbean Basketball Championship

Tournament details
- Host country: Mexico
- Dates: July 25 – July 29
- Teams: 8

Official website
- FIBA Americas

This page shows the results of the 2006 Centrobasket Championship for Women, which was held in the city of Mexico City, Mexico from July 25 to July 29, 2006.

== Group stage ==
=== Group A ===
Team	Pld	W	L	PF	PA	PD	Pts
Cuba	3	3	0	306	141	+165	6
Mexico	3	2	1	251	199	+52	5
Barbados	3	1	2	211	231	-20	4
El Salvador	3	0	3	86	283	-197	3

July 25
13:00

Report

Barbados	50–102	Cuba
Scoring by quarter: 12-23, 10-24, 16-30, 12-25
Pts: Toni Atherley 19; Rebs: Tony Atherley 13; Asts: 5 tied with 1		Pts: Leidys Oquendo Valdes 17; Rebs: Yayma Boulet Peillon 5 Asts: 3 ties with 2

Mexico City

July 25
20:00

Report

Mexico	88–29	El Salvador
Scoring by quarter: 18-3, 23-7, 32-9, 15-10
Pts: Erika Gomez Lozada 21; Rebs: Erika Gomez Lozada 8 Asts: Taine Ramirez Morales 8		Pts: Leticia Esmeralda Gonazales Alvarenga 10; Rebs: Leticia Esmeralda Gonazales Alvarenga 9 Asts: 3 ties with 1

Mexico City

July 26
18:30

Report

El Salvador	31–109	Cuba
Scoring by quarter: 7-29, 13-23, 6-33, 5-24
Pts: Rosario Rocio Palacios Elias 15; Rebs: M.E. Sanchez Villalta and A.A. Lainez Martinez 5 Asts: Kenia Marcela Campos Castro 2		Pts: Yakelyn Plutín Tizon 21; Rebs: Dayna Rodriguez Alvarez 11; Asts: Oyanaisy Gelis Gonzalez 3

Mexico City

July 26
20:30

Report

Mexico	103–75	Barbados
Scoring by quarter: 38-12, 14-20, 26-17, 25-26
Pts: Erika Gomez Lozada 40; Rebs: Erika Gomez Lozada 8 Asts: Taine Ramirez Morales 3		Pts: Wanda Patriena Maynard Morris 24; Rebs: Astrid Alleyne 5 Asts: 3 ties with 1

Mexico City

July 27
18:30

Report

El Salvador	26–86	Barbados
Scoring by quarter: 10-28, 4-18, 8-19, 4-21
Pts: Flor Alicia Calvo Sanabria 6 Rebs: Maria Elena Sanchez Villalta 4 Asts: Leticia Esmeralda Gonazales Alvarenga 1		Pts: Astrid Alleyne 19; Rebs: Astrid Alleyne 11; Asts: Shakira Shorey 2

Mexico City

July 27
20:30

Report

Cuba	95–60	Mexico
Scoring by quarter: 23-17, 28-10, 23-23, 21-10
Pts: Yamara Amargo Delgado 18; Rebs: Yayma Boulet Peillon 6 Asts: T. Suero Coronado and Y. Martinez Calderón 2		Pts: Abril Selene Garcia Alvarez 10; Rebs: Pilar Yvon Vite Galindo 4 Asts: Erika Gomez Lozada 1

Mexico City

=== Group B ===
Team	Pld	W	L	PF	PA	PD	Pts
Puerto Rico	3	3	0	221	182	+39	6
Jamaica	3	2	1	201	185	+16	5
Virgin Islands	3	1	2	183	187	-4	4
Costa Rica	3	0	3	162	213	-51	3

July 25
15:00

Report

Virgin Islands	70–74	Puerto Rico
Scoring by quarter: 13-23, 25-11, 21-18, 11-22
Pts: Shaquana Wilkins 19; Rebs: Lynia Liburd 12; Asts: Damarah Rhymer 4		Pts: Cynthia Marie Valentin 40; Rebs: T. Tapia Quiñonez and L.A. Gonzalez 6 Asts: A. Santos Herandez and L.A. Gonzalez 2

Mexico City

July 25
17:00

Report

Costa Rica	67–71	Jamaica
Scoring by quarter: 11-20, 10-18, 21-20, 25-13
Pts: Natalia Galvez Morales 31; Rebs: Alejandra Iglesias Gonzalez 6 Asts: Zulay Aguilar Villalobos 1		Pts: Oberon Pitterson 17; Rebs: Erika Antonette Messam 10; Asts: Simone Edwards 3

Mexico City

July 26
14:30

Report

Puerto Rico	74–44	Costa Rica
Scoring by quarter: 14-5, 26-10, 19-16, 15-13
Pts: Cynthia Marie Valentin 18; Rebs: Esmary Vargas Sanchez 5 Asts: 4 ties with 1		Pts: Zulay Aguilar Villalobos 13; Rebs: Maria Gamboa Apestegui 5 Asts: Alejandra Iglesias Gonzalez 1

Mexico City

July 26
16:30

Report

Jamaica	62–45	Virgin Islands
Scoring by quarter: 14-21, 17-6, 10-10, 21-8
Pts: Oberon Pitterson 17; Rebs: Simone Edwards 11; Asts: Simone Edwards and Oberon Pitterson 1		Pts: Shaquana Wilkins 19; Rebs: Shaquana Wilkins and Damarah Rhymer 6 Asts: none

Mexico City

July 27
14:30

Report

Costa Rica	51–68	Virgin Islands
Scoring by quarter: 16-17, 14-5, 7-20, 14-26
Pts: Natalia Galvez Morales 17; Rebs: Maria Jose Cascante Chaves 5 Asts: none		Pts: Damarah Rhymer 23; Rebs: Shaquana Wilkins 10; Asts: 3 ties with 1

Mexico City

July 27
16:30

Report

Jamaica	68–73	Puerto Rico
Scoring by quarter: 18-23, 10-17, 24-19, 16-14
Pts: Simone Edwards 19; Rebs: Erika Antonette Messam 10; Asts: none		Pts: Lindsay Angelique Gonzalez 17; Rebs: Esmary Vargas Sanchez 6 Asts: Lindsay Angelique Gonzalez 2

Mexico City

== Knockout stage ==
=== Bracket ===
Semi-finals
July 28
Cuba	87
Jamaica	64
July 28
Puerto Rico	69
Mexico	72

Final
July 29
Cuba	116
Mexico	73
Third place
July 29
Jamaica	71
Puerto Rico	67

5th place bracket

Semi-finals
July 28
Barbados	74
Costa Rica	31
July 28
Virgin Islands	73
El Salvador	49

Fifth place
July 29
Barbados	78
Virgin Islands	62
Seventh place
July 29
Costa Rica	75
El Salvador	53

=== Classification 5-8 ===
July 28
14:00

Report

Barbados	74–31	Costa Rica
Scoring by quarter: 23-12, 19-4, 14-7, 18-8
Pts: Jamila Kandia Studer and W.P. Maynard Morris 18; Rebs: Jamila Kandia Studer 9 Asts: Toni Atherley 1		Pts: Natalia Galvez Morales 8 Rebs: Maria Gabriela Alvarado Ibañez 3 Asts: none

Mexico City

July 28
16:00

Report

Virgin Islands	73–49	El Salvador
Scoring by quarter: 19-8, 13-14, ?-?, ?-?
Pts: Lynia Liburd 20; Rebs: Shaquana Wilkins 9 Asts: Shaquana Wilkins 1		Pts: Maria Elena Sanchez Villalta 21; Rebs: Lisette Margarita Vides Medrano 3 Asts: Lisette Margarita Vides Medrano 1

Mexico City

=== Semifinals ===
July 28
18:00

Report

Cuba	87–64	Jamaica
Scoring by quarter: 17-12, 18-20, 27-19, 25-13
Pts: Yakelyn Plutín Tizon 28; Rebs: Yakelyn Plutín Tizon and Oyanaisy Gelis Gonzalez 5 Asts: Oyanaisy Gelis Gonzalez 5		Pts: Erika Antonette Messam 19; Rebs: Simone Edwards 8 Asts: Rashida Jamila Aikens 1

Mexico City

July 28
20:00

Report

Puerto Rico	69–72	Mexico
Scoring by quarter: 19-28, 11-14, 24-19, 15-11
Pts: Cynthia Marie Valentin 17; Rebs: Tanaira Tapia Quiñonez 5 Asts: Cynthia Marie Valentin 2		Pts: Erika Gomez Lozada 29; Rebs: Erika Gomez Lozada 10; Asts: Taine Ramirez Morales 2

Mexico City

=== Seventh place game ===
July 29
14:30

Report

Costa Rica	75–53	El Salvador
Scoring by quarter: 28-12, 16-12, 24-14, 7-15
Pts: Natalia Galvez Morales and Zulay Aguilar Villalobos 15; Rebs: Marielena Vargas Perez 8 Asts: Natalia Galvez Morales 3		Pts: Rosario Rocio Palacios Elias 21; Rebs: Raquel Eloisa Jovel Iraheta 8 Asts: Astrid Andrea Lainez Martinez 2

Mexico City

=== Fifth place game ===
July 29
16:00

Report

Barbados	78–62	Virgin Islands
Scoring by quarter: 25-13, 13-22, 19-8, 21-19
Pts: Toni Atherley 23; Rebs: Wanda Patriena Maynard Morris 9 Asts: Toni Atherley 3		Pts: Damarah Rhymer 15; Rebs: Lynia Liburd 8 Asts: Damarah Rhymer 1

Mexico City

=== Third place game ===
July 29
18:00

Report

Jamaica	71–67	Puerto Rico
Scoring by quarter: 12-22, 18-13, 17-16, 24-16
Pts: Simone Edwards 17; Rebs: Vanessa Nicole Gidden 7 Asts: Erika Antonette Messam and Simone Ann-Marie Edwards 3		Pts: Cynthia Marie Valentin 31; Rebs: Esmary Vargas Sanchez 9 Asts: Pamela Zoe Rosado Roman 1

Mexico City

=== Final ===
July 29
20:00

Report

Cuba	116–73	Mexico
Scoring by quarter: 35-13, 26-15, 28-19, 27-26
Pts: Yakelyn Plutín Tizon 24; Rebs: Yayma Boulet Peillon 8 Asts: Oyanaisy Gelis Gonzalez and Taimara Suero Coronado 2		Pts: Erika Gomez Lozada 24; Rebs: Erika Gomez Lozada 6 Asts: 5 ties with 1

Mexico City

== Final standings ==
Rank	Team
1st place, gold medalist(s)	Cuba
2nd place, silver medalist(s)	Mexico
3rd place, bronze medalist(s)	Jamaica
4	Puerto Rico
5	Barbados
6	Virgin Islands
7	Costa Rica
8	El Salvador
