= 2008 Centrobasket Women =

2008 FIBA Women's Centrobasket
16th Women's Central American and Caribbean Basketball Championship

Tournament details
- Host country: Puerto Rico
- Dates: July 17 – July 21
- Teams: 8

Official website
- FIBA Americas

This page shows the results of the 2008 Centrobasket Championship for Women, which was held in the city of Morovis, Puerto Rico from July 17 to July 21, 2008.

== Group stage ==
=== Group A ===
Team	Pld	W	L	PF	PA	PD	Pts
Puerto Rico	3	3	0	233	152	+81	6
Mexico	3	2	1	232	211	+21	5
Barbados	3	1	2	197	212	-15	4
Costa Rica	3	0	3	167	254	-87	3

July 17
18:30

Report

Mexico	93–57	Costa Rica
Scoring by quarter: 18-14, 23-12, 26-19, 26-12
Pts: Abril Selene García Álvarez 22; Rebs: F. Gutiérrez Torres Landa and N. Garcia Álvarez 8 Asts: Mariana Elizabeth Cota Toscano 5		Pts: Liliana Lorena Lewis Oconor 11; Rebs: Liliana Lorena Lewis Oconor 7 Asts: Mónica Malavassi 5

Morovis

July 17
21:00

Report

Puerto Rico	68–47	Barbados
Scoring by quarter: 20-10, 9-7, 19-15, 20-15
Pts: Cynthia Marie Valentin 24; Rebs: P.Z. Rosado Roman and L.A. Gonzalez 5 Asts: Yahimily Cabrera 9		Pts: Jamila Kandia Studer 16; Rebs: Jamila Kandia Studer 14; Asts: Sade Clarke 2

Morovis

July 18
18:30

Report

Barbados	70–84	Mexico
Scoring by quarter: 16-22, 18-23, 19-23, 17-16
Pts: Jamila Kandia Studer 22; Rebs: Jamila Kandia Studer 13; Asts: Jamila Kandia Studer 4		Pts: Abril Selene Garcia Alvarez 24; Rebs: Abril Selene Garcia Alvarez 14; Asts: Brisa Margarita Silva Rodriguez 8

Morovis

July 18
20:30

Report

Costa Rica	50–81	Puerto Rico
Scoring by quarter: 12-27, 13-24, 13-15, 12-15
Pts: Natalia Galvez Morales 20; Rebs: Liliana Lorena Lewis Oconor 11; Asts: Marielena Vargas Perez 3		Pts: Cynthia Marie Valentin 17; Rebs: 3 ties with 5 Asts: Yahimily Cabrera 11

Morovis

July 19
18:30

Report

Costa Rica	60–80	Barbados
Scoring by quarter: ?-?, ?-?, ?-?, ?-?
Pts: Natalia Galvez Morales 24; Rebs: Liliana Lorena Lewis Oconor 15; Asts: Mónica Malavassi 9		Pts: Toni Atherley 21; Rebs: Jamila Kandia Studer 18; Asts: 5 ties with 2

Morovis

July 19
20:30

Report

Puerto Rico	84–55	Mexico
Scoring by quarter: ?-?, ?-?, ?-?, ?-?
Pts: Cynthia Marie Valentin 22; Rebs: T. Tapia Quiñonez and E. Vargas Sanchez 9 Asts: Yahimily Cabrera 11		Pts: Abril Selene Garcia Alvarez 22; Rebs: Fernanda Gutiérrez Torres Landa 11; Asts: Mariana Elizabeth Cota Toscano 3

Morovis

=== Group B ===
Team	Pld	W	L	PF	PA	PD	Pts
Cuba	3	3	0	300	119	+181	6
Dominican Republic	3	2	1	207	221	-14	5
Guatemala	3	1	2	155	232	-77	4
Trinidad and Tobago	3	0	3	153	243	-90	3

July 17
14:30

Report

Dominican Republic	72–54	Trinidad and Tobago
Scoring by quarter: 29-10, 8-17, 17-17, 18-10
Pts: Charlenny Frias Henriquez 20; Rebs: 3 ties with 6 Asts: Johanna Morton Gautreaux 5		Pts: Patrice Edwards 14; Rebs: Trecha Ann Jackson-Kennedy and Patrice Edwards 7 Asts: Trecha Ann Jackson-Kennedy and Pietra Luan Gay 2

Morovis

July 17
16:30

Report

Cuba	92–25	Guatemala
Scoring by quarter: 27-3, 19-7, 33-4, 13-11
Pts: Suchitel Avila Cosanas 26; Rebs: Marlen Georgina Cepeda Valle 11; Asts: Oyanaisy Gelis Gonzalez 10		Pts: Blanca Rosa Amado Fergusson 13; Rebs: Sonia Vanessa Vasquez De Leon 8 Asts: Alma Sofia Lopez Valdez 2

Morovis

July 18
14:30

Report

Guatemala	58–80	Dominican Republic
Scoring by quarter: 11-17, 15-18, 14-23, 18-22
Pts: Blanca Rosa Amado Fergusson 22; Rebs: Blanca Rosa Amado Fergusson 8 Asts: Alma Sofia Lopez Valdez 4		Pts: Adalgisa Brito Nova 17; Rebs: Andreina Paniagua Cuevas 10; Asts: Anabel Lucia Perdomo Polanco 8

Morovis

July 18
16:30

Report

Trinidad and Tobago	33–99	Cuba
Scoring by quarter: 17-26, 6-19, 2-29, 14-25
Pts: Patrice Edwards 16; Rebs: Pietra Luan Gay and Alicia Liverpool 6 Asts: Pietra Luan Gay 4		Pts: Suchitel Avila Cosanas 19; Rebs: Marlen Georgina Cepeda Valle 14; Asts: Arlenys Romero Moinelo 8

Morovis

July 19
14:30

Report

Trinidad and Tobago	60–72	Guatemala
Scoring by quarter: ?-?, ?-?, ?-?, ?-?
Pts: Patrice Edwards 20; Rebs: Patrice Edwards 12; Asts: Pietra Luan Gay 7		Pts: Blanca Rosa Amado Fergusson 25; Rebs: Blanca Rosa Amado Fergusson 9 Asts: Alma Sofia Lopez Valdez 3

Morovis

July 19
16:30

Report

Dominican Republic	55–109	Cuba
Scoring by quarter: ?-?, ?-?, ?-?, ?-?
Pts: Andreina Paniagua Cuevas 12; Rebs: Andreina Paniagua Cuevas 6 Asts: Jessica Mercado 4		Pts: Yayma Boulet Peillon 20; Rebs: Yakelyn Plutín Tizon 14; Asts: Arlenys Romero Moinelo 10

Morovis

== Knockout stage ==
=== Bracket ===
Semi-finals
July 20
Cuba	96
Mexico	45
July 20
Puerto Rico	79
Dominican Republic	69

Final
July 21
Cuba	85
Puerto Rico	67
Third place
July 21
Mexico	73
Dominican Republic	81

5th place bracket

Semi-finals
July 20
Barbados	60
Trinidad and Tobago	64
July 20
Guatemala	76
Costa Rica	55

Fifth place
July 21
Trinidad and Tobago	72
Guatemala	61
Seventh place
July 21
Barbados	74
Costa Rica	64

=== Classification 5-8 ===
July 20
14:30

Report

Barbados	60–64	Trinidad and Tobago
Scoring by quarter: 10-12, 12-22, 18-10, 20-19
Pts: Toni Atherley 20; Rebs: Jamila Kandia Studer 10; Asts: Jamila Kandia Studer 3		Pts: Pietra Luan Gay 20; Rebs: Patrice Edwards 8 Asts: Rhea Laurene Codio and Pietra Luan Gay 3

Morovis

July 20
16:30

Report

Guatemala	76–55	Costa Rica
Scoring by quarter: 17-12, 15-14, 20-16, 24-13
Pts: Blanca Rosa Amado Fergusson 26; Rebs: B.R. Amado Fergusson and M. Fleischmann Fischer 9 Asts: Blanca Rosa Amado Fergusson 4		Pts: G. Pinnock Brandford and N. Galvez Morales 13; Rebs: Liliana Lorena Lewis Oconor 10; Asts: Mónica Malavassi 4

Morovis

=== Semifinals ===
July 20
18:30

Report

Cuba	96–45	Mexico
Scoring by quarter: 22-15, 19-5, 32-11, 23-14
Pts: Yamara Amargo Delgado 18; Rebs: Marlen Georgina Cepeda Valle 8 Asts: Oyanaisy Gelis Gonzalez 10		Pts: Alejandra Isabel Delgado Robles 14; Rebs: Alejandra Isabel Delgado Robles 9 Asts: 3 ties with 2

Morovis

July 20
20:30

Report

Puerto Rico	79–69	Dominican Republic
Scoring by quarter: 19-28, 11-14, 24-19, 15-11
Pts: Cynthia Marie Valentin 19; Rebs: Esmary Vargas Sanchez 10; Asts: Yahimily Cabrera 6		Pts: Charlenny Frias Henriquez 13; Rebs: Andreina Paniagua Cuevas 11; Asts: Johanna Morton Gautreaux 3

Morovis

=== Seventh place game ===
July 21
14:30

Report

Barbados	74–64	Costa Rica
Scoring by quarter: 19-19, 17-13, 12-19, 26-13
Pts: Jamila Kandia Studer 26; Rebs: Jamila Kandia Studer 18; Asts: Jamila Kandia Studer and Jennifer Joseph Hackett 3		Pts: Natalia Galvez Morales 27; Rebs: Glendorlee Pinnock Brandford 6 Asts: Alejandra Iglesias Gonzalez 5

Morovis

=== Fifth place game ===
July 21
16:30

Report

Trinidad and Tobago	72–61	Guatemala
Scoring by quarter: 22-17, 15-15, 17-17, 18-12
Pts: Patrice Edwards 31; Rebs: Patrice Edwards 14; Asts: Pietra Luan Gay 7		Pts: Blanca Rosa Amado Fergusson 16; Rebs: Blanca Rosa Amado Fergusson 10; Asts: Alma Sofia Lopez Valdez 4

Morovis

=== Third place game ===
July 21
18:30

Report

Mexico	73–81	Dominican Republic
Scoring by quarter: 21-24, 24-18, 18-18, 10-21
Pts: Abril Selene Garcia Alvarez 29; Rebs: Nubia Garcia Alvarez 14; Asts: Mariana Elizabeth Cota Toscano 6		Pts: Andreina Paniagua Cuevas 22; Rebs: Evelyn Gómez Domínguez 11; Asts: 3 ties with 3

Morovis

=== Final ===
July 21
20:30

Report

Cuba	85–67	Puerto Rico
Scoring by quarter: 23-21, 20-11, 17-25, 25-10
Pts: Yakelyn Plutín Tizon 26; Rebs: Yakelyn Plutín Tizon 12; Asts: Yakelyn Plutín Tizon 5		Pts: Cynthia Marie Valentin 22; Rebs: Tanaira Tapia Quiñonez and Esmary Vargas Sanchez 6 Asts: Yahimily Cabrera 8

Morovis

== Final standings ==
Rank	Team
1st place, gold medalist(s)	Cuba
2nd place, silver medalist(s)	Puerto Rico
3rd place, bronze medalist(s)	Dominican Republic
4	Mexico
5	Trinidad and Tobago
6	Guatemala
7	Barbados
8	Costa Rica
