= Basketball at the 2014 Central American and Caribbean Games =

- Venue: Benito Juárez Auditorium
- Location: Veracruz
- Dates: 19 – 28 November

The basketball competition at the 2014 Central American and Caribbean Games was held in Veracruz, Mexico.

The tournament was scheduled to be held from 19 to 28 November at the Benito Juárez Auditorium.

== Medal summary ==
Event	Gold	Silver	Bronze
Men's tournament	Dominican Republic (DOM); Kelvin Peña; Manuel Fortuna; Jose Acosta; Víctor Liz; Edward Santana; Juan Pablo Montas; Cristian Arias; Juan Suero; Angel Suero; Amaury Filion; Manuel Guzman; Yack Martínez	Panama (PAN); Trevor Gaskins; Edward Jones; Danilo Pinnock; Daniel King; Joel Munoz; Jamaal Levy; Josimar Ayarza; Chris Warren; Ernesto Oglivie; Antonio Garcia; Jaime Lloreda; Jonathan King	Puerto Rico (PUR); Javier Mojica; Andrés Torres; Alexander Franklin; Miguel Berdier; Angel Vasallo; Carlos Rivera; Elias Ayuso; Christian Dalmau; Carlos López; Kevin Young; David Cortés; Angel Alamo
Women's tournament	Cuba (CUB); Fransy Ochoa; Ineidis Casanova; Anisleidy Galindo; Oyanaisy Gelis; Arlenys Romero; Yamara Amargo; Arlety Povea; Marlene Cepeda; Clenia Noblet; Taimy Fernandez; Leidys Oquendo; Suchitel Ávila	Puerto Rico (PUR); Cynthia Valentin; Yashira Delgado; Jazmin Sepulveda; Angelica Bermudez; Carla Cortijo; Yahimilly Cabrera; Yolanda Jones; Sandra Garcia; Dayshalee Salaman; Ashley Prim; Mari Placido; Esmary Vargas	Mexico (MEX); Alexis Castro; Angela Rodríguez; Maria Morales; Annel Tapia; Sandra Sánchez; Sofia Moreno; Casandra Ascencio; Bianca Torre; Myriam Lara; Fernanda Gutierrez; Jazmin Valenzuela

== Women's tournament ==
=== Group A ===
Team	Pld	W	L	PF	PA	PD	Pts	Tie
Puerto Rico	1	1	0	90	63	+27	2	0
Mexico	1	1	0	82	53	+29	2	0
Costa Rica	1	0	1	63	90	−27	1	0
El Salvador	1	0	1	53	82	−29	1	0

19 November 2014
18:00

Boxscore

Costa Rica	63–90	Puerto Rico
Scoring by quarter: 13–23, 18–28, 11–23, 21–16
Pts: Matamoros, Betancourt 17; Rebs: Matamoros 14; Asts: Galvez 4		Pts: Valentin 17; Rebs: Jones 9 Asts: Cabrera 9

Benito Juárez Auditorium, Veracruz
Referees: Natalia Cuello (DOM)

19 November 2014
20:30

Boxscore

Mexico	82–53	El Salvador
Scoring by quarter: 24–11, 24–16, 19–12, 15–14
Pts: Valenzuela 29; Rebs: Valenzuela 15; Asts: Rodriguez 7		Pts: Escobar 13; Rebs: Escobar 11; Asts: Calderon 3

Benito Juárez Auditorium, Veracruz
Referees: Leydys Castellon (CUB)

=== Group B ===
Team	Pld	W	L	PF	PA	PD	Pts	Tie
Cuba	1	1	0	86	36	+50	2	0
Dominican Republic	1	1	0	58	54	+4	2	0
Jamaica	1	0	1	54	58	−4	1	0
Trinidad and Tobago	1	0	1	36	86	−50	1	0

== Medal table ==
* Host nation (Mexico)

Rank	Nation	Gold	Silver	Bronze	Total
1	Cuba (CUB)	1	0	0	1
1	Dominican Republic (DOM)	1	0	0	1
3	Puerto Rico (PUR)	0	1	1	2
4	Panama (PAN)	0	1	0	1
5	Mexico (MEX)*	0	0	1	1
Totals (5 entries)		2	2	2	6
