= 2014 Centrobasket Women =

2014 FIBA Women's Centrobasket
19th Women's Central American and Caribbean Basketball Championship

Tournament details
- Host country: Mexico
- Dates: July 22 – July 26
- Teams: 8

Final positions
- Champions: Cuba

Tournament statistics
- MVP: (Cuba) Yamara Amargo
- Top scorer: (Jamaica) Richards (18.8)
- Top rebounds: (Costa Rica) Matamoros (14.0)
- Top assists: (Puerto Rico) Cortijo (5.6)

Official website
- FIBA Americas

The 2014 Centrobasket Championship for Women was held in the city of Monterrey, Mexico from June 22 to June 26, 2014.

== Group stage ==
=== Group A ===
Pos	Team	Pld	W	L	PF	PA	PD	Pts	Qualification
1	Puerto Rico	3	3	0	246	104	+142	6	Advance to Semifinals
2	Dominican Republic	3	2	1	145	169	−24	5	Advance to Semifinals
3	Mexico	3	1	2	179	186	−7	4	Classification Classification 5-8
4	Costa Rica	3	0	3	115	226	−111	3	Classification Classification 5-8

Source: fiba.com

22 July 2014
17:45

Boxscore

Dominican Republic	27–70	Puerto Rico
Scoring by quarter: 5-19, 7-16, 6-17, 9-18
Pts: Morton, Andujar 7 Rebs: Abreu 6 Asts: 5 players 1		Pts: Garcia 15; Rebs: Garcia 7 Asts: Cortijo 7

Gimnasio Nuevo León Unido, Monterrey (MEX)

22 July 2014
20:00

Boxscore

Mexico	74–44	Costa Rica
Scoring by quarter: 18-13, 22-11, 25-6, 9-14
Pts: Valenzuela 21; Rebs: Valenzuela 12; Asts: Garcia 5		Pts: Galvez 16; Rebs: Matamoros 12; Asts: Alvarado 5

Gimnasio Nuevo León Unido, Monterrey (MEX)

23 July 2014
17:45

Boxscore

Costa Rica	27–92	Puerto Rico
Scoring by quarter: 14-25, 4-16, 4-30, 5-21
Pts: Matamoros 10; Rebs: Matamoros 17; Asts: Betancourt 2		Pts: Garcia 17; Rebs: Garcia 11; Asts: Cabrera 6

Gimnasio Nuevo León Unido, Monterrey (MEX)

23 July 2014
20:00

Boxscore

Dominican Republic	58–55	Mexico
Scoring by quarter: 15-15, 10-15, 11-11, 22-14
Pts: Guzman 17; Rebs: Morton 9 Asts: Santos 3		Pts: Valenzuela 15; Rebs: Valenzuela 16; Asts: Sanchez 6

Gimnasio Nuevo León Unido, Monterrey (MEX)

24 July 2014
17:45

Boxscore

Dominican Republic	60–44	Costa Rica
Scoring by quarter: 15-23, 14-3, 16-8, 15-10
Pts: Panagua 17; Rebs: Monsac 9 Asts: Monsac 3		Pts: Matamoros 14; Rebs: Matamoros 17; Asts: Galvez, Jiménez 2

Gimnasio Nuevo León Unido, Monterrey (MEX)

24 July 2014
20:00

Boxscore

Mexico	50–84	Puerto Rico
Scoring by quarter: 15-16, 15-25, 10-27, 10-16
Pts: Asencio 23; Rebs: Valenzuela 12; Asts: Lara, Valenzuela 2		Pts: Cortijo 15; Rebs: Garcia 12; Asts: Cortijo 8

Gimnasio Nuevo León Unido, Monterrey (MEX)

=== Group B ===
Pos	Team	Pld	W	L	PF	PA	PD	Pts	Qualification
1	Cuba	3	3	0	214	129	+85	6	Advance to Semifinals
2	Virgin Islands	3	2	1	163	147	+16	5	Advance to Semifinals
3	Jamaica	3	1	2	152	168	−16	4	Classification Classification 5-8
4	El Salvador	3	0	3	108	193	−85	3	Classification Classification 5-8

Source: fiba.com

22 July 2014
13:15

Boxscore

Virgin Islands	56–46	Jamaica
Scoring by quarter: 12-9, 14-9, 15-15, 15-13
Pts: Day 24; Rebs: Day 18; Asts: Carey, Bough 3		Pts: Richards 15; Rebs: S.Dixon, Latouche 7 Asts: Latouche, L.Dixon 2

Gimnasio Nuevo León Unido, Monterrey (MEX)

22 July 2014
15:30

Boxscore

El Salvador	31–78	Cuba
Scoring by quarter: 4-21, 6-22, 8-20, 13-15
Pts: Martinez 10; Rebs: Martinez 6 Asts: Campos, Escobar 2		Pts: Cepeda 13; Rebs: Cepeda 14; Asts: Gelis 4

Gimnasio Nuevo León Unido, Monterrey (MEX)

23 July 2014
13:15

Boxscore

Jamaica	58–36	El Salvador
Scoring by quarter: 15-14, 14-8, 13-11, 16-3
Pts: Richards 30; Rebs: Mitchell 12; Asts: S.Dixon, L.Dixon 3		Pts: Escobar 12; Rebs: Escobar 6 Asts: 6 players 1

Gimnasio Nuevo León Unido, Monterrey (MEX)

23 July 2014
15:30

Boxscore

Cuba	60–50	Virgin Islands
Scoring by quarter: 12-10, 10-9, 20-14, 18-17
Pts: Cepeda 17; Rebs: Cepeda 10; Asts: Gelis, Oquendo 3		Pts: Day 23; Rebs: Day 14; Asts: Bough 4

Gimnasio Nuevo León Unido, Monterrey (MEX)

24 July 2014
13:15

Boxscore

El Salvador	41–57	Virgin Islands
Scoring by quarter: 12-15, 10-10, 10-17, 9-15
Pts: Martinez 17; Rebs: Martinez 12; Asts: Escobar 3		Pts: Day 16; Rebs: Day 11; Asts: Bough 6

Gimnasio Nuevo León Unido, Monterrey (MEX)

24 July 2014
15:30

Boxscore

Jamaica	48–76	Cuba
Scoring by quarter: 7-23, 12-19, 19-15, 10-19
Pts: Smith 17; Rebs: Ashmeade 9 Asts: S.Dixon 3		Pts: Amargo 19; Rebs: Noblet 10; Asts: Casanova, Gelis 5

Gimnasio Nuevo León Unido, Monterrey (MEX)

== Final round ==
=== Classification 5-8 ===
25 July 2014
13:15

Boxscore

Mexico	60–48	El Salvador
Scoring by quarter: 11-13, 9-12, 23-7, 17-16
Pts: Asencio 16; Rebs: Lara 11; Asts: Sanchez 4		Pts: Martinez 24; Rebs: Martinez, Heredia 9 Asts: Campos 3

Gimnasio Nuevo León Unido, Monterrey (MEX)

25 July 2014
15:30

Boxscore

Jamaica	81–40	Costa Rica
Scoring by quarter: 17-4, 23-9, 17-15, 24-12
Pts: Richards 25; Rebs: Latouche 13; Asts: S.Dixon 6		Pts: Vargas 11; Rebs: Matamoros 8 Asts: Betancourt 4

Gimnasio Nuevo León Unido, Monterrey (MEX)

=== Semifinals ===
25 July 2014
17:45

Boxscore

Puerto Rico	68–51	Virgin Islands
Scoring by quarter: 9-12, 19-9, 20-14, 20-16
Pts: Cortijo 19; Rebs: Cabrera 13; Asts: Cortijo 7		Pts: Carey 14; Rebs: Day 12; Asts: Carey, Javois 3

Gimnasio Nuevo León Unido, Monterrey (MEX)

25 July 2014
20:00

Boxscore

Cuba	71–44	Dominican Republic
Scoring by quarter: 17-10, 21-10, 9-6, 24-18
Pts: Gelis 13; Rebs: Cepeda 8 Asts: Casanova 6		Pts: Estrella 13; Rebs: Santos 7 Asts: 3 players 2

Gimnasio Nuevo León Unido, Monterrey (MEX)

== Final classification games ==
=== Seventh place game ===
26 July 2014
13:15

Boxscore

El Salvador	44–33	Costa Rica
Scoring by quarter: 15-11, 8-9, 12-6, 9-7
Pts: Escobar 15; Rebs: Escobar 15; Asts: Martinez, Calderon 3		Pts: Matamoros 13; Rebs: Matamoros 16; Asts: 5 players 1

Gimnasio Nuevo León Unido, Monterrey (MEX)

=== Fifth place game ===
26 July 2014
15:30

Boxscore

Mexico	63–49	Jamaica
Scoring by quarter: 12-12, 14-11, 13-13, 24-13
Pts: Valenzuela 15; Rebs: Valenzuela 15; Asts: Sanchez, Lara 3		Pts: Richards 19; Rebs: Richards 12; Asts: S.Dixon 5

Gimnasio Nuevo León Unido, Monterrey (MEX)

=== Third place game ===
26 July 2014
17:45

Boxscore

Virgin Islands	55–61	Dominican Republic
Scoring by quarter: 11-16, 9-12, 20-15, 15-18
Pts: Carey 18; Rebs: Day 13; Asts: Richards 3		Pts: Monsac 11; Rebs: Santos 7 Asts: Monsac 4

Gimnasio Nuevo León Unido, Monterrey (MEX)

=== Final ===
26 July 2014
20:00

Boxscore

Puerto Rico	47–58	Cuba
Scoring by quarter: 6-15, 14-14, 14-16, 13-13
Pts: Cortijo 21; Rebs: Cabrera 6 Asts: Cortijo 5		Pts: Amargo 19; Rebs: Noblet 23; Asts: Casanova, Gelis 4

Gimnasio Nuevo León Unido, Monterrey (MEX)

== Awards ==
Most Valuable Player
(Cuba) Yamara Amargo

== Final standings ==
Qualified for the 2015 FIBA Americas Championship for Women and the 2015 Pan American Games.
Qualified for the 2015 FIBA Americas Championship for Women.

Rank	Team
1st place, gold medalist(s)	Cuba
2nd place, silver medalist(s)	Puerto Rico
3rd place, bronze medalist(s)	Dominican Republic
4	Virgin Islands
5	Mexico
6	Jamaica
7	El Salvador
8	Costa Rica
