= Jennifer O'Neill (basketball) =

Puerto Rican basketball player (born 1990)

Artego Bydgoszcz
- Position: Point guard
- League: BLK

Personal information
- Born: April 19, 1990 (age 36) Bronx, New York, U.S.
- Listed height: 5 ft 5 in (1.65 m)
- Listed weight: 141 lb (64 kg)

Career information
- High school: St. Michael Academy (New York City, New York)
- College: Kentucky (2010–2015)
- WNBA draft: 2015: undrafted
- Playing career: 2015–present

Career history
- 2015: Minnesota Lynx
- 2015: Hapoel Rishon Le-Zion
- 2016: Gigantes de Carolina
- 2016–2017: Haskovo 2012
- 2017–2018: Artego Bydgoszcz
- 2018–2019: Spartak Moscow
- 2019–present: Artego Bydgoszcz

Career highlights
- Centrobasket MVP (2018); BSNF Rookie of the Year (2016); 2x SEC Sixth Player of the Year (2014, 2015); McDonald's All-American (2010)
- Stats at WNBA.com
- Stats at Basketball Reference
Medals
Women's basketball
Representing Puerto Rico
FIBA AmeriCup
Silver medal – second place	2021 San Juan
Pan American Games
Bronze medal – third place	2019 Lima	Team
Centrobasket
Gold medal – first place	2018 Manatí

Jennifer Victoria O'Neill (born April 19, 1990) is a Puerto Rican professional basketball player who has played in the Women's National Basketball Association (WNBA) as well as the Puerto Rican national team.

== Career ==
=== College ===
O'Neill played for the Kentucky Wildcats, where she was SEC 6th Woman of the Year in 2014 and 2015.

=== Professional career ===
In May 2015, O'Neill signed a training camp contract with the Minnesota Lynx and made the final cut for the roster. She made her WNBA debut on June 5, 2015, scoring 2 points, 4 rebounds and 1 assist in 10 minutes in a win over the Tulsa Shock. On July 22, 2015, O'Neill was waived by the Lynx after playing 13 games. During the 2015–16 WNBA off-season, O'Neill played in Israel for Hapoel Rishon Le-Zion and in Puerto Rico for Gigantes de Carolina. In February 2016, O'Neill signed with the Connecticut Sun but was waived before the beginning of the 2016 season. The following off-season O'Neill played in Bulgaria for Haskovo 2012. In February 2017, O'Neill signed a training camp contract with the Seattle Storm.

=== Kentucky statistics ===
Legend
GP	Games played	GS	Games started	MPG	Minutes per game
FG%	Field goal percentage	3P%	3-point field goal percentage	FT%	Free throw percentage
RPG	Rebounds per game	APG	Assists per game	SPG	Steals per game
BPG	Blocks per game	PPG	Points per game	**Bold**	Career high

Year	Team	GP	Points	FG%	3P%	FT%	RPG	APG	SPG	BPG	PPG
2010–11	Kentucky	30	153	33.6	36.2	**73.9**	1.3	0.9	0.5	0.0	5.1
2011–12	Kentucky	Redshirt									
2012–13	Kentucky	**35**	381	**39.4**	35.6	71.4	2.3	**2.8**	1.3	0.1	10.9
2013–14	Kentucky	**35**	441	38.5	**36.4**	70.1	2.4	**2.8**	1.0	0.1	12.6
2014–15	Kentucky	33	**474**	36.8	32.3	72.2	**3.4**	2.1	**1.4**	**0.2**	**14.4**
Career Totals	Kentucky	133	1449	37.6	34.9	71.5	2.4	2.2	1.1	0.1	10.9

== WNBA career statistics ==
Legend
GP	Games played	GS	Games started	MPG	Minutes per game	RPG	Rebounds per game
APG	Assists per game	SPG	Steals per game	BPG	Blocks per game	PPG	Points per game
TO	Turnovers per game	FG%	Field-goal percentage	3P%	3-point field-goal percentage	FT%	Free-throw percentage
**Bold**	Career best	°	League leader

=== Regular season ===
Year	Team	GP	GS	MPG	FG%	3P%	FT%	RPG	APG	SPG	BPG	TO	PPG
2015	Minnesota	13	0	7.8	.348	.556	1.000	1.1	0.8	0.2	0.1	0.7	2.2
Career	1 year, 1 team	13	0	7.8	.348	.556	1.000	1.1	0.8	0.2	0.1	0.7	2.2
