= Mayra Gil =

Mexican basketball player (born 2003)

No. 13 – Freseras de Irapuato
- League: LNBPF

Personal information
- Born: 13 December 2003 (age 22) Puerto Vallarta, Mexico
- Listed height: 5 ft 9 in (1.75 m)

Career information
- College: Universidad Modelo (2022–2023)
- Playing career: 2020–present

Career history
- 2020–2021: Marineras de Puerto Vallarta
- 2021–2023: Mieleras de Guanajuato
- 2023: Astros de Jalisco
- 2023: Marineras de Puerto Vallarta
- 2023: Manzaneras de Cuauhtémoc
- 2024: Mieleras de Guanajuato
- 2024: Freseras de Irapuato
- 2024: Lobas de Saltillo
- 2025: Mieleras de Guanajuato
- 2025–: Freseras de Irapuato

Career highlights
- LNBPF Revelation of the Year (2024); 3× LMBPF champion (2022, 2024, 2025); LMBPF Finals MVP (2024); 2× LMBPF Finals Ideal Quintet (2024, 2025); 3× LMBPF All-Star (2023, 2024, 2025); LMBPF All-Star Game MVP (2025); LMBPF Three-Point Contest champion (2022); LBN scoring leader (2023)
Medals
Women's basketball
Representing Mexico
Centrobasket
Bronze medal – third place	2024 Irapuato	Team competition
FISU America Games
Gold medal – first place	2022 Mérida	Team competition

Mayra Gil Ramírez (born 13 December 2003) is a Mexican professional basketball player for the Freseras de Irapuato of the Liga Nacional de Baloncesto Profesional Femenil (LNBPF). She has also represented the Mexico women's national team.

== Early life and amateur career ==
Gil was born on 13 December 2003, in Puerto Vallarta, Jalisco, Mexico, where she began playing basketball on the outside courts at the age of seven. Her younger sister, María, is also a basketball player. Gil was trained in the youth academy of local club Marineras de Puerto Vallarta, who she represented at the 2019 Copa Vallarta Internacional de Baloncesto.

Following the 2022 professional season, Gil joined the Universidad Modelo women's basketball team, which was newly promoted to Division I of the Liga ABE. She played the first half of the 2022–2023 season, averaging 17.3 points, 7.3 rebounds, and 1.3 assists in eight appearances, before returning to the professional ranks in early 2023. Gil recorded one double-double in college, tallying 24 points and 12 rebounds against the Aztecas UDLAP.

== Professional career ==
In 2020, Gil made her professional debut for the Marineras de Puerto Vallarta senior team in the Liga Mexicana de Baloncesto Profesional Femenil (LMBPF). She averaged 2.5 points, 2.3 rebounds, and 1.5 assists in six games. However, the remainder of the season was cancelled due to the COVID-19 pandemic. Gil returned to the Marineras in 2021, averaging 14.8 points, 4.4 rebounds, and 2.2 assists per game on the season. Later that year, she joined the Mieleras de Guanajuato ahead of the 2021 Circuito de Baloncesto del Bajío (CIBABAJ) season, where she averaged double-digits in scoring and was nominated for the Rookie of the Year award.

Gil subsequently played for the Mieleras in the 2022 LMBPF season. In April, she won the three-point shooting contest at the league's all-star game after putting up 20 points in the final round. The following month, Gil scored 33 points on 14-of-18 shooting in a 115–42 blowout win over the Phoenix de Monterrey. She finished the season with averages of 12.8 points, 2.9 assists, and 2.2 rebounds per game and helped the Mieleras capture the 2022 LMBPF championship. Gil named to the all-LMBPF domestic players team and the all-LMBPF second team by Latinbasket.com.

Gil returned to the Mieleras ahead of the 2023 LMBPF season. In March, she recorded back-to-back double-doubles versus the Teporacas de Chihuahua: a 15-point, 13-rebound performance on 10 March followed by a 21-point, 15-rebound performance the next day. Gil averaged 14.5 points, 6.5 rebounds, 2.5 assists, and 2.1 steals per game, earning league all-star honors and again participating in the three-point contest. She was also named to the all-LMBPF second team by Latinbasket.com. However, Gil left the team prior to the start of the playoffs to join the Astros de Jalisco of the Liga Nacional de Baloncesto Profesional Femenil (LNBPF) for the 2023 LNBPF season, where she averaged 2.5 points and 1.5 rebounds per game in a reduced role. She subsequently returned to her hometown team, the Marineras de Puerto Vallarta, for the 2023 season of the Liga ABC MEX, a newly-created league for local homegrown talent. Gil averaged a team-high 17 points to go with 4.9 rebounds and 2.9 assists per game during the regular season, helping the Marineras qualify for the playoffs, where they lost to the Aztks del Estado de México. She finished the year with the Manzaneras de Cuauhtémoc of the Liga de Básquetbol del Norte Femenil (LBN), yet another upstart league, helping them reach the playoffs as well.

Gil joined the Mieleras ahead of the 2024 LMBPF season. She averaged 12.2 points, 3.8 rebounds, and 2.5 assists per game, ranking second in the league in both total assists (62) and total steals (46), and earned league all-star honors. After compiling a perfect regular-season record of 20–0, the Mieleras captured the LMBPF title by beating the Libélulas de CDMX, 3–1, in the championship series, and Gil was named the LMBPF Finals MVP. She was also named to the all-LMBPF domestic players team and the all-LMBPF second team by Latinbasket.com. Gil subsequently joined the Freseras de Irapuato for the 2024 LNBPF season. On 10 May, she recorded 18 points, five rebounds, and four assists in their first win of the season, a 76–56 victory over the Panteras de Aguascalientes. In the regular season finale on 22 June, Gil posted 21 points, six rebounds, and three assists in an 82–76 win over the Fuerza Regia de Monterrey, with the Freseras earning their first playoff berth in team history. She finished the season with averages of 7.8 points, 4.2 rebounds, and 2.3 assists in 16 games, and was named the LNBPF Revelation of the Year. After the season, Gil acknowledged the rapid growth of women's basketball in Mexico, which allowed her to play in different leagues year-round and make a living in the sport, unlike her predecessors. She next joined the Lobas de Saltillo for the 2024 Liga ABC MEX season, helping them reach the finals, where they lost to the Aztks del Estado de México.

Gil returned to the Mieleras for the 2025 LMBPF season. In the season opener on 25 January, she recorded 20 points, five rebounds, and four steals in an 86–73 win over the Libélulas de CDMX. Gil averaged 11.1 points, 3.9 rebounds, 2.3 assists, and 2.7 steals per game, leading the league in total steals (62) and ranking third in three-pointers made with 44, and was named the All-Star Game MVP. She also helped the Mieleras achieve a perfect regular-season record of 16–0. In Game 1 of the finals, Gil "dominated the paint" and grabbed a game-high 14 rebounds in a 90–60 win over the Libélulas de CDMX. She scored a team-high 27 points and grabbed seven rebounds in an 85–80 Game 3 victory that helped the Mieleras clinch their second straight championship with a series sweep over the Libélulas. Gil was named to the Ideal Quintet for the series, and was also named to the all-LMBPF domestic players team and the all-LMBPF second team by Latinbasket.com. She then joined the Freseras de Irapuato for the 2025 LNBPF season.

== National team career ==
=== Youth ===
At the youth level, Gil represented Mexico at the 2019 FIBA Under-16 Americas Championship in Chile. She averaged 4.2 points, three rebounds, and 1.5 assists per game. Gil and her college team, Universidad Modelo, competed on behalf of Mexico in the 2022 FISU America Games held in Mexico. She helped her team win the gold medal after scoring 17 points in their 78–62 win against the American representatives, the University of Providence, in the final.

=== Senior ===
In July 2022, Gil was included on a 24-woman preliminary roster for the senior national team ahead of the 2022 FIBA COCABA Championship. However, she was unable to compete for a final spot on the team due to personal matters. Gil earned another preliminary call-up in July 2024 ahead of 2026 FIBA Women's World Cup pre-qualifiers. She was named to the final 12-woman roster by head coach Lindsey Harding the following month. Gil made her official senior international debut in Mexico's opening game on 19 August, scoring six points in a 71–65 victory over Mozambique. She averaged 6.3 points, 3.5 rebounds, and 1.3 assists in four games during the tournament, including a 14-point, six-rebound performance in a 74–71 overtime loss to Montenegro.

In October 2024, Gil was named to Mexico's preliminary roster for the 2024 Centrobasket Women. She was named to the final 12-woman roster the following month by head coach Mitch Thompson. In their opening game, Gil scored a team-high 17 points, including five three-pointers, in a 109–31 win over Guatemala. She averaged 9.8 points, 1.6 rebounds, and 1.6 assists in five games as she helped Mexico win the bronze medal.
