= 2015 FIBA COCABA Championship for Women =

Tournament details
- Host country: Costa Rica
- Dates: 23–27 September
- Teams: 7
- Venue(s): 1 (in 1 host city)

The 2015 FIBA COCABA Championship for Women was the regional basketball championship of FIBA Americas for the Central American and Caribbean subzone. First and second national teams qualified to 2016 Centrobasket Women. The tournament was held in the city of Cartago, Costa Rica, from 23 to 27 September 2015.

== Participating teams ==
- Honduras
- Guatemala
- Costa Rica
- Mexico
- Nicaragua
- El Salvador
- Panama

== Preliminary round ==
The draw for the 2015 FIBA COCABA Championship for Women was held on August 4, 2015. Seven teams were drawn into one pool with 4 teams and another one with 3 teams.

=== Group A ===
Pos	Team	Pld	W	L	PF	PA	PD	Pts	Qualification
1	El Salvador	2	1	1	156	131	+25	3	Advance to Semifinals
2	Costa Rica	2	1	1	133	129	+4	3	Advance to Semifinals
3	Honduras	2	1	1	119	148	−29	3	Classification 5–7

Source: fiba.com

September 23
20:00

Boxscore

Costa Rica	73–68	El Salvador
Scoring by quarter: 20–17, 19–18, 19–20, 15–13
Pts: Matamoros 22; Rebs: Matamoros 21; Asts: Betancourt 6		Pts: Aguilar 21; Rebs: Rodriguez 9 Asts: Campos 4

Cartago

September 24
16:00

Boxscore

El Salvador	88–58	Honduras
Scoring by quarter: 27–14, 17–8, 28–20, 16–16
Pts: Funes 22; Rebs: Aguilar 16; Asts: Aguilar 6		Pts: Leva 23; Rebs: Buelto 13; Asts: Leva 7

Cartago

September 25
20:00

Boxscore

Honduras	61–60	Costa Rica
Scoring by quarter: 20–12, 9–6, 15–23, 17–19
Pts: Leva 20; Rebs: Martinez 22; Asts: Leva 7		Pts: Villalobos 12; Rebs: Matamoros 21; Asts: Betancourt, Corrales 3

Cartago

=== Group B ===
Pos	Team	Pld	W	L	PF	PA	PD	Pts	Qualification
1	Mexico	3	3	0	249	147	+102	6	Advance to Semifinals
2	Guatemala	3	2	1	209	181	+28	5	Advance to Semifinals
3	Panama	3	1	2	216	238	−22	4	Classification 5–6
4	Nicaragua	3	0	3	137	245	−108	3	Classification 5–7

Source: fiba.com

September 23
15:30

Boxscore

Nicaragua	39–87	Mexico
Scoring by quarter: 6–17, 12–21, 12–30, 9–19
Pts: Guerrero 11; Rebs: Salomon, Orozco 7 Asts: Chamorro, Garcia 2		Pts: Ruiz 19; Rebs: Nuñez 10; Asts: Silva 7

Cartago

September 23
17:30

Boxscore

Guatemala	85–74	Panama
Scoring by quarter: 23–20, 20–15, 21–23, 21–16
Pts: Vasquez 33; Rebs: Vasquez 13; Asts: Rosales 6		Pts: Him 19; Rebs: Him 10; Asts: 4 players 3

Cartago

September 24
18:00

Boxscore

Panama	80–69	Nicaragua
Scoring by quarter: 15–22, 24–23, 25–14, 16–10
Pts: Vega 19; Rebs: Ellis 12; Asts: Pierre 5		Pts: Salomon 24; Rebs: Salomon 10; Asts: Guerrero, I.Slate 4

Cartago

September 24
20:00

Boxscore

Mexico	78–46	Guatemala
Scoring by quarter: 26–12, 17–9, 17–13, 18–12
Pts: Silva 17; Rebs: Lara 11; Asts: Garcia 7		Pts: Vasquez 12; Rebs: 3 players 8 Asts: Del Valle, Vasquez 3

Cartago

September 25
16:00

Boxscore

Nicaragua	29–78	Guatemala
Scoring by quarter: 3–27, 8–14, 10–23, 8–14
Pts: Guerrero 7 Rebs: T.Slate, I.Slate 7 Asts: I.Slate 3		Pts: Vasquez 17; Rebs: Amado 12; Asts: Del Valle 5

Cartago

September 25
18:00

Boxscore

Panama	62–84	Mexico
Scoring by quarter: 9–23, 19–16, 20–23, 14–22
Pts: Brown 26; Rebs: Brown 12; Asts: Molinar 3		Pts: Ruiz 16; Rebs: Nuñez 12; Asts: Garcia 6

Cartago

== Knockout round ==
Semifinals
19 September
El Salvador	53
Guatemala	61
19 September
Mexico	60
Costa Rica	42

Final
20 September
Guatemala	49
Mexico	57
3rd place
20 September
El Salvador	57
Costa Rica	39

=== 5th−7th places semifinal ===
September 26
15:00

Boxscore

Honduras	77–58	Nicaragua
Scoring by quarter: 8–23, 22–10, 28–14, 19–11
Pts: Leva 32; Rebs: Martinez 15; Asts: Reichle, Leva 5		Pts: Salomon 11; Rebs: T.Slate 14; Asts: Chamorro, Guerrero 5

Cartago

=== Semifinals ===
September 26
17:00

Boxscore

El Salvador	53–61	Guatemala
Scoring by quarter: 11–18, 19–17, 14–11, 9–15
Pts: Aguilar 17; Rebs: Rivas 8 Asts: Campos 5		Pts: Vasquez 17; Rebs: Vasquez 15; Asts: Lopez 4

Cartago

September 26
19:00

Boxscore

Mexico	60–42	Costa Rica
Scoring by quarter: 22–12, 11–2, 20–10, 7–18
Pts: Ruiz 18; Rebs: Lara 12; Asts: Silva 7		Pts: Matamoros 12; Rebs: Matamoros 8 Asts: Villalobos, Betancourt 2

Cartago

=== 5th place match ===
September 27
15:00

Boxscore

Honduras	68–60	Panama
Scoring by quarter: 16–21, 10–10, 25–9, 17–20
Pts: Leva 29; Rebs: Williams 17; Asts: Leva 4		Pts: Brown 19; Rebs: Him 16; Asts: Him 3

Cartago

=== Third place match ===
September 27
17:00

Boxscore

Costa Rica	39–57	El Salvador
Scoring by quarter: 10–11, 7–21, 16–10, 6–15
Pts: Villalobos 15; Rebs: Matamoros 13; Asts: Betancourt 3		Pts: Aguilar 16; Rebs: Aguilar 17; Asts: Aguilar, Campos 5

Cartago

=== Final ===
September 27
19:00

Boxscore

Mexico	57–49	Guatemala
Scoring by quarter: 10–15, 9–12, 13–14, 25–8
Pts: Ruiz 17; Rebs: Nuñez 17; Asts: Dominguez 3		Pts: Amado, Vasquez 15; Rebs: Amado, Vasquez 9 Asts: Lopez, Amado 3

Cartago

2015 FIBA COCABA Championship winners

Mexico
Third title

== Final standings ==
Rank	Team	W–L
1st place, gold medalist(s)	Mexico	5–0
2nd place, silver medalist(s)	Guatemala	4–1
3rd place, bronze medalist(s)	El Salvador	2–2
4	Costa Rica	1–3
5	Honduras	3–1
6	Panama	1–3
7	Nicaragua	0–4

Qualified for the 2017 Centrobasket Women
