= 2004 Centrobasket Women =

2004 FIBA Women's Centrobasket
14th Women's Central American and Caribbean Basketball Championship

Tournament details
- Host country: Guatemala
- Dates: July 27 – July 31
- Teams: 8

Official website
- FIBA Americas

This page shows the results of the 2004 Centrobasket Championship for Women, which was held in the city of Guatemala City, Guatemala from July 27 to July 31, 2004.

== Preliminary round ==
Team	Pld	W	L	PF	PA	PD	Pts
Cuba	3	3	0	330	136	+194	6
Puerto Rico	3	2	1	239	207	+32	5
Guatemala	3	1	2	160	265	-105	4
Costa Rica	3	0	3	143	264	-121	3

July 27

Puerto Rico	86–53	Costa Rica

Guatemala City

July 27

Cuba	116–42	Guatemala

Guatemala City

July 28

Costa Rica	41–121	Cuba

Guatemala City

July 28

Guatemala	61–100	Puerto Rico

Guatemala City

July 29

Cuba	93–53	Puerto Rico

Guatemala City

July 29

Guatemala	57–49	Costa Rica

Guatemala City

== Bracket ==
Semi-finals
July 30
Cuba	110
Costa Rica	40
July 30
Puerto Rico	93
Guatemala	46

Final
July 31
Cuba	118
Puerto Rico	65
Third place
July 31
Guatemala	71
Costa Rica	53

== Final standings ==
Rank	Team
1st place, gold medalist(s)	Cuba
2nd place, silver medalist(s)	Puerto Rico
3rd place, bronze medalist(s)	Guatemala
4	Costa Rica
