= 1999 Centrobasket Women =

1999 FIBA Women's Centrobasket
11th Women's Central American and Caribbean Basketball Championship

Tournament details
- Host country: Cuba
- Dates: May 4 – May 9
- Teams: 6
- Venue: (in Havana host cities)

Final positions
- Champions: Cuba (9th title)

Official website
- FIBA Archive

This page shows the results of the 1999 Women's Central American and Caribbean Basketball Championship, also known as the 1999 Centrobasket For Women, which was held in the city of Havana, Cuba from May 4 to May 9, 1999.

== Competing nations ==
Bahamas; Cuba; Dominican Republic	Guatemala; Puerto Rico; Mexico

== Preliminary round ==
Team	Pld	W	L	PF	PA	PD	TB	Qualification
Cuba	5	5	0	449	209	+240		Championship game
Dominican Republic	5	3	2	358	368	-10	+6	Championship game
Mexico	5	3	2	297	273	24	+5	3rd place game
Puerto Rico	5	3	2	325	363	-38	-11	3rd place game
Bahamas	5	1	4	241	335	-94		5th place game
Guatemala	5	0	5	246	368	-122		5th place game

May 4

Puerto Rico	78–64	Bahamas

Havana

May 4

Mexico	78–43	Guatemala

Havana

May 4

Cuba	120–48	Dominican Republic

Havana

May 5

Puerto Rico	45–64	Mexico

Havana

May 5

Dominican Republic	74–44	Bahamas

Havana

May 5

Guatemala	39–91	Cuba

Havana

May 6

Mexico	51–65	Dominican Republic

Havana

May 6

Puerto Rico	69–63	Guatemala

Havana

May 6

Cuba	77–43	Bahamas

Havana

May 7

Bahamas	48–45	Guatemala

Havana

May 7

Dominican Republic	89–97	Puerto Rico

Havana

May 7

Cuba	78–43	Mexico

Havana

May 8

Bahamas	42–61	Mexico

Havana

May 8

Guatemala	56–82	Dominican Republic

Havana

May 8

Cuba	83–36	Puerto Rico

Havana

== Final round ==
=== 5th place ===
May 9

Bahamas	60–54	Guatemala

Havana

=== 3rd place ===
May 9

Mexico	63–59	Puerto Rico

Havana

=== Final ===
May 9

Cuba	117–61	Dominican Republic

Havana

== Final ranking ==
Rank	Team
1st place, gold medalist(s)	Cuba
2nd place, silver medalist(s)	Dominican Republic
3rd place, bronze medalist(s)	Mexico
4	Puerto Rico
5	Bahamas
6	Guatemala

1999 Women's Centrobasket winners

Cuba
Ninth title
