= 2003 Centrobasket Women =

2003 FIBA Women's Centrobasket
13th Women's Central American and Caribbean Basketball Championship

Tournament details
- Host country: Mexico
- Dates: July 2 – July 6
- Teams: 8

Official website
- FIBA Americas

This page shows the results of the 2003 Centro Basket Championship for Women, which was held in the city of Leon, Mexico from July 2 to July 6, 2003.

== Competing nations ==
Group A	Group B
Cuba; Puerto Rico; Virgin Islands; Costa Rica	Dominican Republic; Mexico; Guatemala

== Preliminary round ==
=== Group A ===
Team	Pld	W	L	PF	PA	PD	Pts
Cuba	3	3	0	308	129	+179	6
Puerto Rico	3	2	1	202	243	-41	5
Virgin Islands	3	1	2	203	252	-49	4
Costa Rica	3	0	3	184	273	-89	3

July 2

Puerto Rico	79–69	Virgin Islands

Leon

July 2

Cuba	106–39	Costa Rica

Leon

July 3

Cuba	93–51	Virgin Islands

Leon

July 3

Puerto Rico	84–65	Costa Rica

Leon

July 4

Costa Rica	80–83	Virgin Islands

Leon

July 4

Cuba	109–39	Puerto Rico

Leon

=== Group B ===
Team	Pld	W	L	PF	PA	PD	Pts
Dominican Republic	2	2	0	173	132	+41	4
Mexico	2	1	1	138	132	+6	3
Guatemala	2	0	2	128	175	-47	2

July 2

Mexico	63–73	Dominican Republic

Leon

July 3

Dominican Republic	100–69	Guatemala

Leon

July 4

Mexico	75–59	Guatemala

Leon

== Semi Final Round ==
=== Loser finish 7th ===
July 5

Costa Rica	101–86	Guatemala

Leon

=== 1st/4th place ===
July 5

Dominican Republic	72–70	Puerto Rico

Leon

July 5

Cuba	99–49	Mexico

Leon

== Final round ==
=== 5th/6th place ===
July 6

Virgin Islands	79–42	Costa Rica

Leon

=== 3rd/4th place ===
July 6

Mexico	69–79	Puerto Rico

Leon

=== Final ===
July 6

Cuba	101–68	Dominican Republic

Leon

== Final ranking ==
1. Cuba

2. Dominican Republic

3. Puerto Rico

4. Mexico

5. Virgin Islands

6. Costa Rica

7. Guatemala

2003 Women's Centrobasket winners

Cuba
Eleventh title
