= 2024 FIBA Women's Olympic Qualifying Tournaments – Xi'an =

Basketball tournament in China

2024 FIBA World Olympic Qualifying Tournament for Women
Tournament details
- Host country: China
- City: Xi'an
- Dates: 8–11 February
- Teams: 4 (from 3 confederations)
- Venue: 1 (in 1 host city)

Final positions
- Champions: France
- Runners-up: China
- Third place: Puerto Rico
- Fourth place: New Zealand

Tournament statistics
- Games played: 6
- Attendance: 28,500 (4,750 per game)
- MVP: (France) Gabby Williams
- Top scorer: (China) Li Meng (19.3 ppg)

Official website
- WOQT China

The 2024 FIBA Women's Olympic Qualifying Tournament in Xi'an was one of four 2024 FIBA Women's Olympic Qualifying Tournaments. The tournament was held at Xi'an, China, from 8 to 11 February 2024, to determine the competitors for the 2024 Summer Olympics women's basketball event.

== Teams ==
Team	Qualification	Date of qualification	WR
China	Top four at 2023 FIBA Women's Asia Cup	28 June 2023	2
France	Host nation for the Olympics	–	7
Puerto Rico	Top two at 2024 Americas Pre-Qualifying Tournament	10 November 2023	12
New Zealand	Top four at 2023 FIBA Women's Asia Cup	30 June 2023	23

== Venue ==
Xi'an	2024 FIBA Women's Olympic Qualifying Tournaments – Xi'an (China)
Shaanxi Provincial Gymnasium	2024 FIBA Women's Olympic Qualifying Tournaments – Xi'an (China)
Capacity:	2024 FIBA Women's Olympic Qualifying Tournaments – Xi'an (China)

== Standings ==
Pos	Team	Pld	W	L	PF	PA	PD	Pts	Qualification
1	France (Note: France was already qualified as the host nation.)	3	3	0	264	129	+135	6	Summer Olympics
2	China (H)	3	2	1	249	198	+51	5	Summer Olympics
3	Puerto Rico	3	1	2	178	260	−82	4	Summer Olympics
4	New Zealand	3	0	3	153	257	−104	3	

Source: FIBA
Rules for classification: 1) Points; 2) Head-to-head results; 3) Points difference; 4) Points scored.
(H) Hosts

== Results ==
All times are local (UTC+8).

8 February 2024
16:30

Boxscore

Puerto Rico	40–88	France
Scoring by quarter: 6–15, 7–22, 9–31, 18–20
Pts: Rosado 7 Rebs: Hollingshed 10; Asts: Guirantes 2		Pts: Johannès 17; Rebs: Badiane 11; Asts: Johannès 6

Shaanxi Provincial Gymnasium, Xi'an
Attendance: 3,800
Referees: James Boyer (AUS), Daigo Urushima (JPN), Alan dos Santos (BRA)

8 February 2024
19:00

Boxscore

China	94–47	New Zealand
Scoring by quarter: 22–12, 31–10, 24–12, 17–13
Pts: Xu 21; Rebs: Li Yue. 12; Asts: Li Yua. 11		Pts: McGoldrick 11; Rebs: Whittaker 6 Asts: Whittaker 6

Shaanxi Provincial Gymnasium, Xi'an
Attendance: 4,700
Referees: Ariadna Chueca (ESP), Péter Praksch (HUN), Cecília Tóth (HUN)

10 February 2024
16:30

Boxscore

France	82–50	China
Scoring by quarter: 17–10, 27–14, 26–12, 12–14
Pts: Johannès, Williams 17; Rebs: Williams 7 Asts: Bernies 6		Pts: Li M. 21; Rebs: Li Yue. 8 Asts: Huang S. 4

Shaanxi Provincial Gymnasium, Xi'an
Attendance: 6,000
Referees: James Boyer (AUS), Alan dos Santos (BRA), Jacquiline Dover (AUS)

10 February 2024
19:00

Boxscore

New Zealand	67–69	Puerto Rico
Scoring by quarter: 25–16, 5–17, 21–16, 16–20
Pts: Beck 21; Rebs: McGoldrick 10; Asts: Beck, Reed 5		Pts: Hollingshed 20; Rebs: Hollingshed 14; Asts: Guirantes 8

Shaanxi Provincial Gymnasium, Xi'an
Attendance: 6,000
Referees: Ariadna Chueca (ESP), Kristian Paez (ECU), Daigo Urushima (JPN)

11 February 2024
16:30

Boxscore

New Zealand	39–94	France
Scoring by quarter: 9–28, 8–33, 10–19, 12–14
Pts: McGoldrick 10; Rebs: McGoldrick 6 Asts: Beck 4		Pts: Williams 21; Rebs: Salaün 8 Asts: Michel 9

Shaanxi Provincial Gymnasium, Xi'an
Attendance: 3,000
Referees: James Boyer (AUS), Péter Praksch (HUN), Jacquiline Dover (AUS)

11 February 2024
19:00

Boxscore

Puerto Rico	69–105	China
Scoring by quarter: 11–24, 23–30, 8–33, 27–18
Pts: Guirantes 27; Rebs: Quiñones 4 Asts: Rosado 4		Pts: Li M. 23; Rebs: Li Yue. 23; Asts: Li Yua. 10

Shaanxi Provincial Gymnasium, Xi'an
Attendance: 5,000
Referees: Ariadna Chueca (ESP), Kristian Paez (ECU), ília Tóth (HUN)

== Statistics and awards ==
=== Statistical leaders ===
Players

Points

Name	PPG
(China) Li Meng	19.3
(France) Gabby Williams	16.3
(China) Li Yueru	15.3
(Puerto Rico) Arella Guirantes	15.0
(France) Marine Johannès	14.0

Rebounds

Name	RPG
(China) Li Yueru	14.3
(Puerto Rico) Mya Hollingshed	8.3
(China) Han Xu	6.3
(France) Marième Badiane	6.3
(New Zealand) Esra McGoldrick	6.3

Assists

Name	APG
(China) Li Yuan	7.7
(France) Sarah Michel	5.3
(China) Wang Siyu	4.7
(France) Romane Bernies	4.0
(France) Marine Johannès	4.0
(New Zealand) Stella Beck	4.0

Blocks

Name	BPG
(China) Han Xu	2.3
(France) Dominique Malonga	1.7
(Puerto Rico) Mya Hollingshed	1.7
(China) Li Yueru	1.3
(France) Marième Badiane	1.0
(France) Gabby Williams	1.0
(New Zealand) Esra McGoldrick	1.0

Steals

Name	SPG
(France) Sarah Michel	3.0
(France) Gabby Williams	2.7
(France) Janelle Salaün	2.3
(New Zealand) Lauren Whittaker	2.0
(France) Marième Badiane	1.7
(France) Dominique Malonga	1.7

Efficiency

Name	EFFPG
(China) Li Yueru	23.7
(France) Gabby Williams	19.3
(China) Han Xu	17.3
(China) Li Meng	16.3
(France) Marine Johannès	16.0

==== Teams ====
Points

Team	PPG
France	88.0
China	83.0
Puerto Rico	59.3
New Zealand	51.0

Rebounds

Team	RPG
China	47.0
France	44.7
Puerto Rico	40.0
New Zealand	36.0

Assists

Team	APG
France	25.7
China	25.3
New Zealand	13.0
Puerto Rico	10.3

Blocks

Team	BPG
France	5.0
China	4.7
Puerto Rico	2.7
New Zealand	1.7

Steals

Team	SPG
France	16.3
China	7.3
New Zealand	5.3
Puerto Rico	4.7

Efficiency

Team	EFFPG
France	124.0
China	105.7
Puerto Rico	41.3
New Zealand	35.7

=== Awards ===
The all star-team and MVP were announced on 11 February 2024.

All-Star Team
Guards	Forwards	Center
(France) Marine Johannès (China) Li Meng	(Puerto Rico) Mya Hollingshed (France) Gabby Williams	(China) Han Xu
MVP: (France) Gabby Williams
