= Sofía Roma =

Puerto Rican basketball player

Personal information
- Born: November 21, 1996 (age 29) Richmond Hill, New York, U.S.
- Listed height: 188 cm (6 ft 2 in)

Career information
- High school: Nazareth Regional (Brooklyn, New York)
- College: Wagner; Duke
- Playing career: 2019–present
- Position: Power forward / Center
- Number: 11

Career history
- 2019–2020: Cangrejeras de Santurce
- 2020: Della Fiore Broni
- 2021: Grupo Hafesa Raca Granada
- 2022: Södertälje BBK
- 2023: A.S. Vicenza
- 2023: Montañeras de Morovis
- 2026: Njarðvík
Medals
Women's basketball
Representing Puerto Rico
Pan American Games
Bronze medal – third place	2019 Lima	Team
Centrobasket Women
Gold medal – first place	2022 Mexico	Team
Central American and Caribbean Games
Bronze medal – third place	2023 San Salvador	Team

Sofía Roma (born November 21, 1996) is a Puerto Rican and Italian basketball player who represents Puerto Rico in international play. Roma played college basketball at Wagner College and later Duke.

== Early life ==
An Italian-Puerto Rican, Roma was born on November 21, 1996, in the Richmond Hill neighborhood of New York City, New York. A center, Roma played high school basketball at Nazareth Regional.

== College career ==
Roma played college basketball for the Wagner Seahawks, which represent Wagner College. In her freshman season, she was noted for her rebounding and shot-blocking, averaging 5.8 rebounds and 1.0 blocks per game in 29 games played. She then averaged 10.0 rebounds per game in her sophomore year. Following the season, she transferred to Duke University, where she played for the Blue Devils. Due to the NCAA's transfer rules, she sat out the 2016–17 season. She made her debut with Duke on January 25, 2018, against Boston College. She dealt with knee issues, causing her to have limited playing time while at Duke.

== Professional career ==
Roma has played professional club basketball in Sweden, Italy, Spain, and Puerto Rico. After finishing her college career at Duke, she played for the Cangrejeras de Santurce of the Puerto Rican Baloncesto Superior Nacional Femenino (BSNF) league in 2019 and 2020. In June 2020, she signed with the Italian club Della Fiore Broni of the Lega Basket Femminile (LBF). In August 2021, Roma signed with Grupo Hafesa Raca Granada of the Liga Femenina Challenge. She later played for Södertälje BBK in Sweden. In January 2023, she signed with A.S. Vicenza. In 2023, Roma returned to the BSNF to play for the Montañeras de Morovis.

In January 2026, Roma signed with Njarðvík of the Icelandic Úrvalsdeild kvenna.

== National team career ==
Holding both Puerto Rican and Italian nationality, Roma represents Puerto Rico in international tournament play as a power forward and center. She was on the women's national junior team in 2011 at the FIBA Under-16 Women's AmeriCup in Mexico. She also played at Women's U17 Centrobasket tournament in 2013.

Roma made her debut for the senior team in 2015, at the 2015 Pan American Games. She was later on Puerto Rico's roster at the 2019 Pan American Games in Lima, with the team winning bronze. Roma also represented Puerto Rico at three AmeriCup tournaments (2015, 2019, and 2023). She also played for Puerto Rico at the 2022 FIBA Women's Basketball World Cup, where the team lost in the quarter-finals. The team recorded two wins in group play, which were Puerto Rico's first wins in either World Cup or Olympic play. Roma played for Puerto Rico at the 2022 Centrobasket Women tournament, helping the team win the championship.

Roma helped Puerto Rico qualify for the 2024 Summer Olympics in Paris, being on the team's roster in the qualifying tournament held in Xi'an. In May, she played in an exhibition game between the Puerto Rico women's national team and the Las Vegas Aces of the Women's National Basketball Association (WNBA). After being named to a 15-woman preliminary roster for Puerto Rico's Olympic play, Roma was named to Puerto Rico's final 12-woman roster for the 2024 Summer Olympics.

== Off the court ==
She graduated from Duke in May 2018 with a bachelor's degree in politic science and later from the Fuqua School of Business with a masters in management studies. Roma is the Head of Sports Desk for The Field Team, a Soethby's-affiliated real estate company in New York.

== Career statistics ==
Legend
GP	Games played	GS	Games started	MPG	Minutes per game
FG%	Field goal percentage	3P%	3-point field goal percentage	FT%	Free throw percentage
RPG	Rebounds per game	APG	Assists per game	SPG	Steals per game
BPG	Blocks per game	PPG	Points per game	**Bold**	Career high

Year	Team	GP	GS	MPG	FG%	3P%	FT%	RPG	APG	SPG	BPG	PPG
2014–15	Wagner	28	1	15.8	.400	–	.455	5.8	.1	.5	1.0	3.2
2015–16	Wagner	28	27	28.3	.380	–	.630	10.0	.6	.5	2.1	5.7
2016–17	Duke	Did not play due to NCAA transfer rules										
2017–18	Duke	12	0	5.8	.333	–	.200	1.3	.3	.3	.0	.8
2018–19	Duke	24	0	5.3	.500	–	1.000	1.0	.2	.0	.1	.4
Statistics retrieved from Wagner Athletics and ESPN.
