= Jerry Batista =

Puerto Rican basketball coach

Jerry Batista is a Puerto Rican basketball coach for the Puerto Rican national team.
