= Guatemala women's national basketball team =

Women's national basketball team representing Guatemala

Guatemala
- FIBA ranking: 78 ▼4 (March 18, 2026)
- FIBA zone: FIBA Americas
- National federation: Federación Nacional de Baloncesto de Guatemala

Olympic Games
- Appearances: None

World Cup
- Appearances: None

FIBA AmeriCup
- Appearances: None

The Guatemala women's national basketball team (Spanish: Selección femenina de baloncesto de Guatemala) represents Guatemala in international basketball competitions. They are overseen by the Guatemala National Basketball Federation (Spanish: Federación Nacional de Baloncesto de Guatemala) (FNBG), the governing body for basketball in Guatemala.

== Competitive record ==
=== Central American and Caribbean Games ===
- 1950 – 2nd place
- 1959 – 2nd place
- 1966 – 3rd place
- 1990 – 4th place
- 2002 – 4th place
- 2010 – 6th place
- 2018 – 7th place

=== Central American Games ===
- 2006 – 1st place

=== Centrobasket ===
- 1991 – 4th place
- 1993 – 5th place
- 1999 – 6th place
- 2001 – 5th/6th place
- 2003 – 7th place
- 2004 – 3rd place
- 2008 – 6th place
- 2010 – 7th place
- 2017 – 6th place
- 2018 – 7th place
- 2022 – 6th place
- 2024 – 8th place

=== COCABA Championship ===
- 2004 – 1st place
- 2007 – 1st place
- 2009 – 2nd place
- 2015 – 2nd place
- 2022 – 3rd place
- 2023 – 2nd place
- 2025 – 5th place

== See also ==
- Guatemala men's national basketball team
- Guatemala women's national under-17 and under-18 basketball team
- Guatemala women's national under-15 and under-16 basketball team
