= Arella Guirantes =

American basketball player (born 1997)

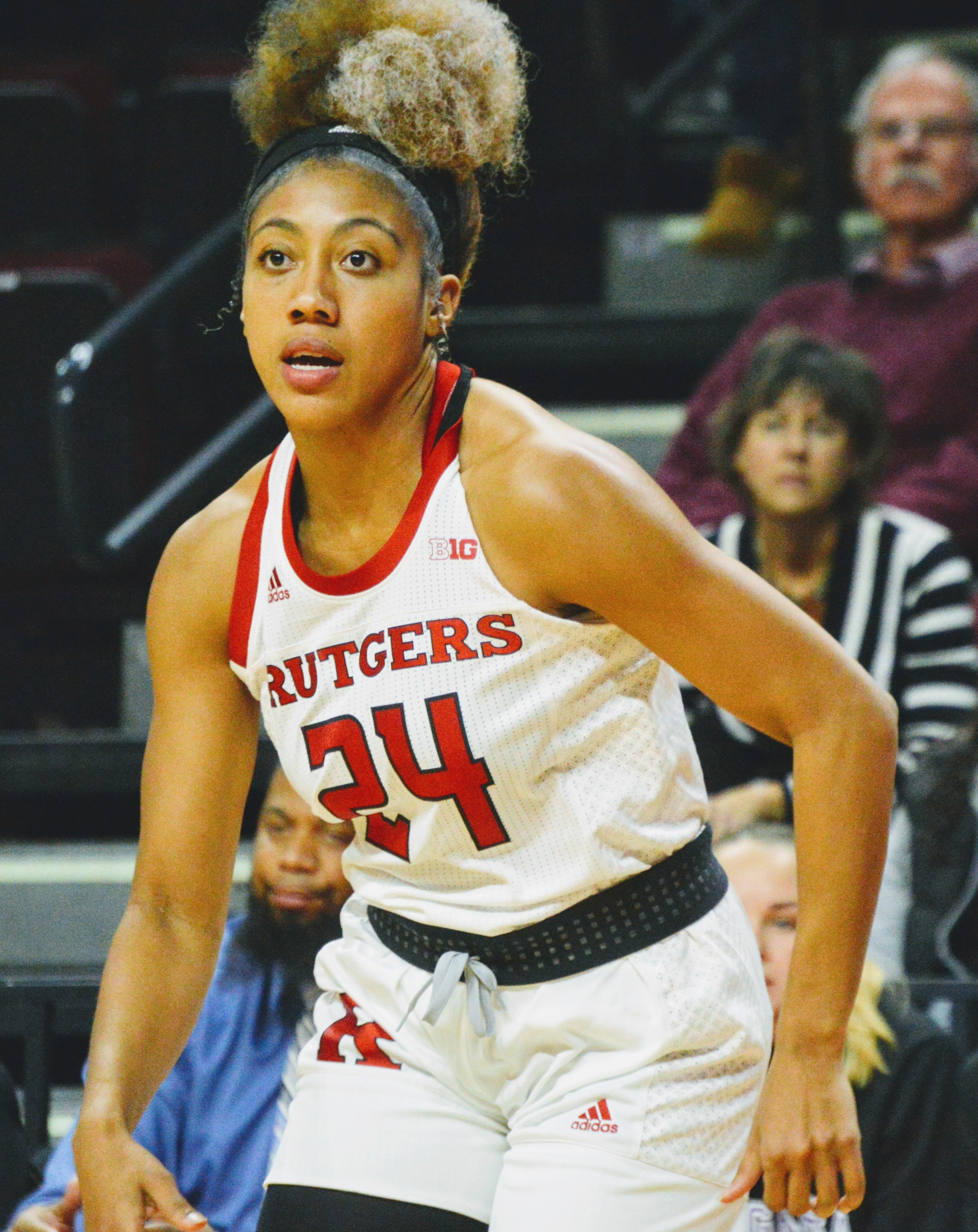
- Guirantes with Rutgers in 2019

Free agent
- Position: Guard

Personal information
- Born: October 15, 1997 (age 29) Long Island, New York, U.S.
- Listed height: 5 ft 11 in (1.80 m)
- Listed weight: 176 lb (80 kg)

Career information
- High school: Bellport (Brookhaven Hamlet, New York)
- College: Texas Tech (2016–2017); Rutgers (2017–2021)
- WNBA draft: 2021: 2nd round, 22nd overall pick
- Drafted by: Los Angeles Sparks
- Playing career: 2021–present

Career history
- 2021: Los Angeles Sparks
- 2021–2022: Budivelnyk
- 2022–2023: Diósgyőri VTK
- 2023: Seattle Storm
- 2023–2024: Beretta Famila Schio
- 2024: CB Avenida
- 2025: Shanghai Swordfish
- 2025–: Elitzur Ramla

Career highlights
- 2× Centrobasket MVP (2022, 2024); Big Ten All-Defensive Team (2021); 2× First-team All-Big Ten (2020, 2021)
- Stats at WNBA.com
- Stats at Basketball Reference
Medals
Women's basketball
Representing Puerto Rico
Centrobasket
Gold medal – first place	2022 Chihuahua
Gold medal – first place	2024 Irapuato
FIBA AmeriCup
Silver medal – second place	2021 San Juan

Arella Karin Guirantes (born October 15, 1997) is an American professional basketball player play for Elitzur Ramla of the Israeli Women's Basketball Premier League. She played college basketball at Texas Tech and Rutgers. She was drafted by the Los Angeles Sparks of the Women's National Basketball Association (WNBA).

== Early life ==
Guirantes scored over 2,000 points and was selected to the NYSSWA All-State First Team during her time at Bellport High School. She averaged 33 points, 13 rebounds, 3.5 assists, 3 steals and 2.6 blocks per game at IMG Academy. She was rated the #44 player in the nation per ProspectNation and was the #17 wing player in the 2016 class per Hoopgurlz.

== College ==
=== Texas Tech ===
Following her high school career, Guirantes committed to playing for the Texas Tech Lady Raiders. She was second on the team in scoring at 9.9 points per game and started 27 out of 29 games. She was also named Freshman of the Week for the Big 12 one time.

=== Rutgers ===
Following her freshman year at Tech, Guirantes transferred to Rutgers. Due to the NCAA transfer rules, she had to sit out the 2016–17 season. In her first season playing for the Knights, Guirantes averaged 12.1 points and 4.3 rebounds. She was named Honorable Mention All-Big Ten. In her second season with Rutgers, she continued to make an impact averaging 20.6 points, 6.0 rebounds, and 3.1 assists. She was rewarded for her hard work with being named to the AP, USBWA, and the WBCA All-American Honorable Mention Team. She was named 1st Team All-Big Ten by the Coaches and Media. She also joined the 1,000 Point Club on January 20 against Michigan State. In her final season with Rutgers, she averaged 20.8 points, 6.0 rebounds, and 5.3 assists. She led the Knights to the 2021 NCAA Division I women's basketball tournament.

=== Texas Tech and Rutgers statistics ===
Ratios
Year	Team	GP	FG%	3P%	FT%	RBG	APG	BPG	SPG	PPG
2016-17	Texas Tech	29	41.1%	26.9%	87.1%	4.828	1.241	0.966	1.069	9.931
2017-18	Rutgers	Sat due to NCAA transfer rules								
2018-19	Rutgers	32	39.5%	24.0%	80.5%	4.219	1.688	0.281	1.219	12.063
2019-20	Rutgers	30	41.3%	38.5%	81.0%	6.033	3.133	1.233	1.600	20.600
2020-21	Rutgers	19	41.6%	37.8%	86.8%	6.000	5.158	1.789	2.158	21.263
Career		110	40.9%	31.9%	83.1%	5.182	2.564	0.982	1.445	15.418

Totals
Year	Team	GP	FG	FGA	3P	3PA	FT	FTA	REB	A	BK	ST	PTS
2016-17	Texas Tech	29	108	263	18	67	54	62	140	36	28	31	288
2017-18	Rutgers	Sat due to NCAA transfer rules											
2018-19	Rutgers	32	146	370	24	100	70	87	135	54	9	39	386
2019-20	Rutgers	30	205	496	37	96	171	211	181	94	37	48	618
2020-21	Rutgers	19	137	329	31	82	99	114	114	98	34	41	404
Career		110	596	1458	110	345	394	474	570	282	108	159	1696

== WNBA career ==
=== Los Angeles Sparks ===
Guirantes was the 22nd pick in the 2021 WNBA draft by the Los Angeles Sparks.

Guirantes made the Sparks roster for the 2021 season and played her entire rookie season there. She averaged 3.2 points. Following the 2022 training camp with the Sparks, Guirantes was waived and did not make the team.

=== Seattle Storm ===
On February 6, 2023, Guirantes signed a training camp contract with the Seattle Storm. Guirantes made the 2023 Opening Night roster and was a member of the Storm team until the end of June. On June 29, 2023, Guirantes was waived by the Storm.

=== Chicago Sky ===
On February 22, 2025, Guirantes signed a training camp contract with the Chicago Sky. She was waived on May 3.

=== Overseas ===
Guirantes signed on 12 November 2025 in Elitzur Ramla from Israeli League in the 2025–26 off-season.

== WNBA career statistics ==
Legend
GP	Games played	GS	Games started	MPG	Minutes per game	RPG	Rebounds per game
APG	Assists per game	SPG	Steals per game	BPG	Blocks per game	PPG	Points per game
TO	Turnovers per game	FG%	Field-goal percentage	3P%	3-point field-goal percentage	FT%	Free-throw percentage
**Bold**	Career best	°	League leader

=== Regular season ===
Year	Team	GP	GS	MPG	FG%	3P%	FT%	RPG	APG	SPG	BPG	TO	PPG
2021	Los Angeles	**25**	**2**	**11.6**	**.274**	**.222**	**.808**	**1.3**	**0.6**	**0.3**	0.2	0.5	**3.2**
2023	Seattle	9	0	5.2	.250	.167	.600	0.7	0.3	0.1	**0.4**	**0.3**	1.3
Career	2 years, 2 teams	34	2	9.9	.270	.212	.774	1.1	0.5	0.3	0.2	0.4	2.7
