= Tayra Meléndez =

Puerto Rican basketball player

ŽKK Šibenik
- Position: Forward
- League: A-1 Liga

Personal information
- Born: October 29, 1993 (age 33) Massachusetts, United States
- Listed height: 5 ft 7 in (1.70 m)

Career information
- College: Rhode Island (2014–2016)
- WNBA draft: 2016: undrafted
Medals
Women's basketball
Representing Puerto Rico
FIBA AmeriCup
Silver medal – second place	2021 San Juan
Bronze medal – third place	2017 Buenos Aires
Pan American Games
Bronze medal – third place	2019 Lima	Team
Central American and Caribbean Games
Bronze medal – third place	2018 Barranquilla	Team
Bronze medal – third place	2023 San Salvador	Team

Tayra Verónica Meléndez (born October 29, 1993) is a Puerto Rican basketball player for Gigantes de Carolina and the Puerto Rican national team.

She participated at the 2018 FIBA Women's Basketball World Cup, and 2022 FIBA Women's Basketball World Cup.

== Statistics ==
Ratios
Year	Team	GP	FG%	3P%	FT%	RBG	APG	BPG	SPG	PPG
2012-13	Rhode Island	27	33.3%	21.4%	67.9%	4.444	1.222	1.333	1.000	10.370
2013-14	Rhode Island	25	32.8%	37.3%	73.0%	4.720	1.960	1.520	1.000	12.960
2014-15	Rhode Island	30	36.8%	26.5%	64.6%	6.000	1.900	1.167	1.767	7.700
2015-16	Rhode Island	30	38.2%	33.3%	52.4%	6.133	2.067	1.500	1.300	6.267
Career		112	34.8%	29.7%	67.1%	5.375	1.795	1.375	1.286	9.134

Totals
Year	Team	GP	FG	FGA	3P	3PA	FT	FTA	REB	A	BK	ST	PTS
2012-13	Rhode Island	27	104	312	15	70	57	84	120	33	36	27	280
2013-14	Rhode Island	25	102	311	28	75	92	126	118	49	38	25	324
2014-15	Rhode Island	30	81	220	18	68	51	79	180	57	35	53	231
2015-16	Rhode Island	30	73	191	20	60	22	42	184	62	45	39	188
Career		112	360	1034	81	273	222	331	602	201	154	144	1023
