= Tanaira Tapia =

Puerto Rican basketball player

Tanaira Tapia (born July 28, 1983) is a member of the Puerto Rico Women's Basketball National Team, and part of the six-time champions Gigantes de Carolina on the Puerto Rico Women's Netball League. In 2003, Tapia was awarded the finals MVP. She was selected the 2004 most outstanding basketball player of Puerto Rico alongside NBA player Carlos Arroyo.

Naples Daily News attributed the first home loss of Florida Gulf Coast University to Tapia, reporting that coach Karl Smesko "spent much of the first half [of the game] substituting players and hoping to find a combination that could neutralize Puerto Rico- Bayamon's Tanaira Tapia (12 points, 13 rebounds) in the post".
