= Dominican Republic women's national basketball team =

Dominican Republic
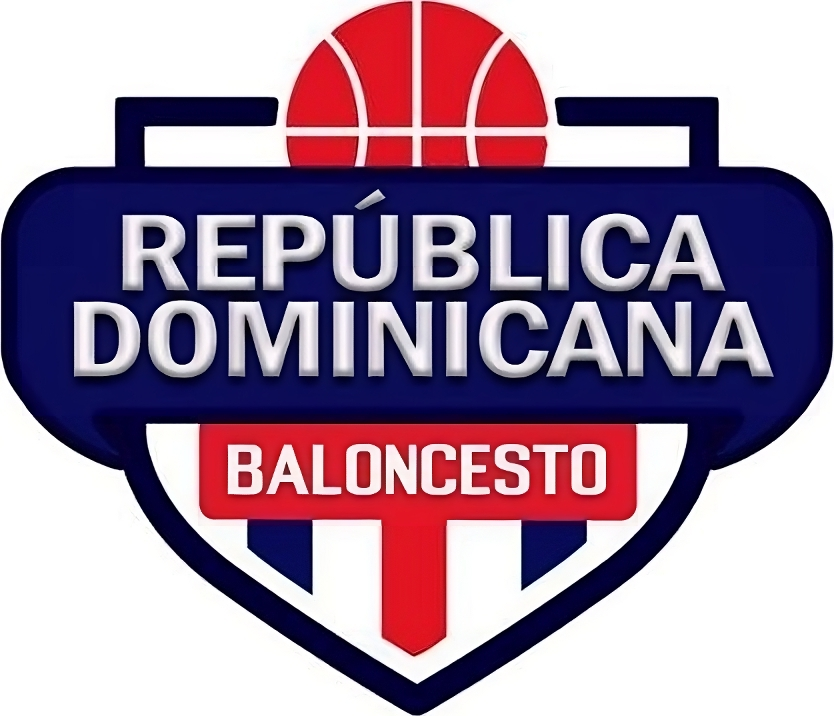
- FIBA ranking: 36 ▼3 (18 March 2026)
- FIBA zone: FIBA Americas
- National federation: Dominican Republic Basketball Federation (FEDOMBAL)
- Coach: Alberto Zabala

FIBA AmeriCup
- Appearances: 13
Home	Away

The Dominican Republic women's national basketball team participates in international competitions.

== Results ==
=== FIBA Americas Championship ===
- 1989 – 6th place
- 1997 – 8th place
- 1999 – 6th place
- 2003 – 7th place
- 2005 – 6th place
- 2009 – 8th place
- 2013 – 9th place
- 2015 – 10th place
- 2019 – 7th place
- 2021 – 7th place
- 2023 – 10th place
- 2025 – 8th place
- 2027 – Qualified

=== Pan American Games ===
- 1975 – 7th place
- 1999 – 6th place
- 2003 – 6th place
- 2015 – 8th place

=== Centrobasket ===
- 1971 – 5th
- 1973 – 4th
- 1975 – 3rd
- 1977 – 2nd
- 1981 – 4th
- 1985 – 3rd
- 1989 – 2nd
- 1993 – 4th
- 1995 – 3rd
- 1997 – 3rd
- 1999 – 2nd
- 2003 – 2nd
- 2008 – 3rd
- 2010 – 5th
- 2012 – 3rd
- 2014 – 3rd

== Current roster ==
Roster for the 2025 FIBA Women's AmeriCup.

Dominican Republic women's national basketball team roster
Players
Coaches

Pos.	No.	Name	Age – Date of birth	Height	Club	Ctr.
PG	1	Glorivel Rodríguez	21 – 15 June 2004	1.63 m (5 ft 4 in)
SF	3	Cesarina Cappelan	21 – 3 July 2003	1.78 m (5 ft 10 in)	B. F. León	(Spain)
G	5	Yohanna Morton (C)	37 – 12 December 1987	1.72 m (5 ft 8 in)	Valladolid	(Spain)
F	6	Yenifer Jiménez	26 – 1 January 1999	1.75 m (5 ft 9 in)
G	7	Genesis Evangelista	32 – 25 February 1993	1.80 m (5 ft 11 in)	Mauricio Báez BC	(Dominican Republic)
PG	8	Yamel Abreu	29 – 23 August 1995	1.70 m (5 ft 7 in)	Pueblo Nuevo BC	(Dominican Republic)
PF	9	Madelyn Batista	24 – 5 August 2000	1.89 m (6 ft 2 in)	San Lazaro Club	(Dominican Republic)
C	13	Giocelis Reynoso	29 – 11 December 1995	1.90 m (6 ft 3 in)	Club Calero	(Dominican Republic)
PG	15	Yirsy Quéliz	21 – 19 April 2004	1.74 m (5 ft 9 in)	Olímpicas de La Vega	(Dominican Republic)
F	21	Anyi Hodge	28 – 23 June 1997	1.82 m (6 ft 0 in)
G	24	Hellary de los Santos	23 – 6 January 2002	1.78 m (5 ft 10 in)	Olímpicas de La Vega	(Dominican Republic)
C	44	Ileana Sosa	22 – 3 June 2003	1.86 m (6 ft 1 in)	Club Ivan Guzman	(Dominican Republic)

Head coach

- (Dominican Republic) Alberto Zabala

Assistant coach(es)

- (Cuba) Ariel Portuondo

Legend

- (C) Team captain
- Club – describes last
  club before the tournament
- Age – describes age
  on 28 June 2025
