= El Salvador women's national basketball team =

El Salvador
- FIBA ranking: 51 ▼3 (18 March 2026)
- Joined FIBA: 1956
- FIBA zone: FIBA Americas
- National federation: Federación Salvadoreña de Baloncesto
- Coach: José Santana

FIBA AmeriCup
- Appearances: 3

The El Salvador women's national basketball team is governed by the Federación Salvadoreña de Baloncesto (FESABAL) and represents El Salvador in international competitions.

== History ==
On 24 July, 2023 El Salvador won their first international title winning the 2023 FIBA COCABA Championship after defeating Guatemala 68-47. El Salvador won the round tournament going undefeated, Destiny Campbell was awarded MYP title averaging 22.2 points per game.

== Records ==
=== World Cup ===
- Yet to qualify

=== Pan American Games ===
- 1975 – 8th

=== Americas Championship ===
Year	Round	Position	Pld	W	L
(Brazil) 1989	Did not qualify				
(Brazil) 1993	Did not qualify				
(Canada) 1995	Did not qualify				
(Brazil) 1997	Did not qualify				
(Cuba) 1999	Did not qualify				
(Brazil) 2001	Did not qualify				
(Mexico) 2003	Did not qualify				
(Dominican Republic) 2005	Did not qualify				
(Chile) 2007	Did not qualify				
(Brazil) 2009	Did not qualify				
(Colombia) 2011	Did not qualify				
(Mexico) 2013	Did not qualify				
(Canada) 2015	Did not qualify				
(Argentina) 2017	Did not qualify				
(Puerto Rico) 2019	Did not qualify				
(Puerto Rico) 2021	Preliminary round	9th	4	0	4
(Mexico) 2023	Did not qualify				
(Chile) 2025	Preliminary round	10th	4	0	4
(El Salvador) 2027	Qualified as host				
(Nicaragua) 2029	Qualified as host				
Total	0 Titles	3/20	8	0	8

=== Centrobasket ===
- 1975 – 4th place
- 2021 – 4th place
- 2022 – 5th place
- 2024 – 4th place

=== FIBA COCABA Championship ===
- 2007 – 3rd place
- 2009 – 4th place
- 2013 – 2nd place
- 2015 – 3rd place
- 2022 – 2nd place
- 2023 – 1st place
- 2025 – 2nd place

== Team ==
=== Current roster ===
Roster for the 2025 FIBA Women's AmeriCup.

El Salvador women's national basketball team roster
Players
Coaches

Pos.	No.	Name	Age – Date of birth	Height	Club	Ctr.
SG	4	Hilary Martínez	28 – 12 April 1997	1.75 m (5 ft 9 in)	Salvadoreñas	(Mexico)
SF	5	Ana Quijano	19 – 19 December 2005	1.60 m (5 ft 3 in)	Salvadoreñas	(El Salvador)
F	7	Liliana Alvarado	27 – 29 July 1997	1.70 m (5 ft 7 in)	Salvadoreñas	(El Salvador)
SF	7	Gabriela Escobar	18 – 19 March 2007	1.65 m (5 ft 5 in)	FESA	(El Salvador)
C	9	Silvia Vega	22 – 27 April 2003	1.84 m (6 ft 0 in)	Salvadoreñas	(El Salvador)
F	10	Emily Tévez	22 – 4 March 2003	1.75 m (5 ft 9 in)	Salvadoreñas	(El Salvador)
F	11	Elisa Domínguez (C)	24 – 20 July 2000	1.65 m (5 ft 5 in)	Salvadoreñas	(El Salvador)
PG	14	Adriana Rivas	29 – 11 May 1996	1.76 m (5 ft 9 in)	San Salvador	(El Salvador)
PG	16	Fátima Avilés	26 – 9 June 1999	1.60 m (5 ft 3 in)	Salvadoreñas	(El Salvador)
C	22	Kimberly Villalobos	23 – 10 December 2001	1.88 m (6 ft 2 in)	Salvadoreñas	(El Salvador)
PG	24	Gabriela Alfaro	21 – 11 February 2004	1.69 m (5 ft 7 in)	Salvadoreñas	(El Salvador)
C	44	Brandi Harves-Carr	30 – 16 September 1994	1.93 m (6 ft 4 in)	Salvadoreñas	(El Salvador)

Head coach

- (Spain) José Santana

Assistant coach(es)

- (El Salvador) Ernesto Rodríguez

Legend

- (C) Team captain
- Club – describes last
  club before the tournament
- Age – describes age
  on 28 June 2025

=== Head coaches ===
- (Spain) Ray Santana (2017–)
