= Puerto Rico women's national basketball team =

Governed by the Puerto Rican Basketball Federation

Puerto Rico
- FIBA ranking: 13 (18 March 2026)
- Joined FIBA: 1957
- FIBA zone: FIBA Americas
- National federation: Puerto Rican Basketball Federation
- Coach: Jerry Batista
- Nickname(s): 12 Magníficas; 12 Guerreras

Olympic Games
- Appearances: 2

World Cup
- Appearances: 3

FIBA AmeriCup
- Appearances: 14
- Medals: (2021) (1995, 2017)

Pan American Games
- Appearances: 4
- Medals: (2011) (2019)
Light	Away

First international
- Colombia 33–31 Puerto Rico (Barranquilla, Colombia; 10 December 1946)

Biggest win
- Puerto Rico 118–24 Saint Vincent and the Grenadines (Mayagüez, Puerto Rico; 18 July 2010); Puerto Rico 113–20 Costa Rica (Manatí, Puerto Rico; 21 August 2018)

Biggest defeat
- Brazil 136–72 Puerto Rico (São Paulo, Brazil; 6 August 1997)

Puerto Rico women's national basketball team in September 2026

The Puerto Rico women's national basketball team (Spanish: Selección femenina de Baloncesto de Puerto Rico) is governed by the Puerto Rican Basketball Federation (Spanish: Federación de Baloncesto de Puerto Rico).

== Tournament record ==
=== Olympic Games ===
Year	Position	Pld	W	L
(Japan) 2020	12th	3	0	3
(France) 2024	10th	3	0	3
Total		6	0	6

=== World Championship ===
Year	Position	Pld	W	L
(Chile) 1953	did not qualify	–	–	–
(Brazil) 1957	did not qualify	–	–	–
(Soviet Union) 1959	did not qualify	–	–	–
(Peru) 1964	did not qualify	–	–	–
(Czechoslovakia) 1967	did not qualify	–	–	–
(Brazil) 1971	did not qualify	–	–	–
1975 to 1994	did not qualify	–	–	–
(Germany) 1998	did not qualify	–	–	–
(China) 2002	did not qualify	–	–	–
(Brazil) 2006	did not qualify	–	–	–
(Czechoslovakia) 2010	did not qualify	–	–	–
(Turkey) 2014	did not qualify	–	–	–
(Spain) 2018	Group stage	3	0	3
(Australia) 2022	Quarterfinals	6	2	4
(Germany) 2026	Qualification to Quarter-finals	4	1	3
(Japan) 2030	To be determined			
Total		13	3	10

==== Record against other teams at the World Cup ====
Country	W–L
Belgium	0–2
Bosnia and Herzegovina	1–0
Canada	0–1
China	0–1
Japan	0–1
South Korea	1–0
Spain	0–1
United States	0–1
Total record	2–7

=== FIBA Americas Championship ===
- 1993 – 6th place
- 1995 – 3rd place
- 1997 – 7th place
- 1999 – 7th place
- 2005 – 5th place
- 2009 – 5th place
- 2011 – 5th place
- 2013 – 4th place
- 2015 – 6th place
- 2017 – 3rd place
- 2019 – 4th place
- 2021 – 2nd place
- 2023 – 4th place
- 2025 – 6th place
- 2027 – Qualified

=== Pan American Games ===
Year	Position	Pld	W	L				
1955 to 2007	did not participate							
(Mexico) 2011	Champions	5	4	1				
(Canada) 2015	6th	4	1	3				
(Peru) 2019	Third place	5	3	2				
(Chile) 2023	7th	4	2	2				
(Peru) 2027	To be determined							
(Paraguay) 2031	To be determined				Total	18	10	8

=== Central American and Caribbean Games ===
Year	Position	Pld	W	L
1935 to 1974	Not known			
(Colombia) 1978	Third place	5	3	2
(Cuba) 1982	Runner-up	4	3	1
(Dominican Republic) 1986	–	–	–	–
(Mexico) 1990	–	–	–	–
(Puerto Rico) 1993	Runner-up			
(Venezuela) 1998	Third place			
(El Salvador) 2002	Runner-up			
(Colombia) 2006	Runner-up	6	5	1
(Puerto Rico) 2010	Champions	5	5	0
(Mexico) 2014	Runner-up	5	4	1
(Colombia) 2018	Third place	5	4	1
(El Salvador) 2023	Third place			
Total		30	24	6

== Current roster ==
Roster for the 2026 FIBA Women's Basketball World Cup.

Puerto Rico women's national basketball team roster
Players
Coaches

Pos.	No.	Name	Age – Date of birth	Height	Club	Ctr.
F	1	Tayra Meléndez	32 – 29 October 1993	1.80 m (5 ft 11 in)	Gigantes de Carolina	(Puerto Rico)
SG	2	Brianna Jones	29 – 9 February 1997	1.85 m (6 ft 1 in)	Cangrejeras de Santurce	(Puerto Rico)
PG	3	Nina De León	23 – 26 January 2003	1.68 m (5 ft 6 in)	Pollitas de Isabela	(Puerto Rico)
PG	5	Pamela Rosado (C)	40 – 30 April 1986	1.65 m (5 ft 5 in)	Atenienses de Manatí	(Puerto Rico)
G	6	Zaida González	23 – 17 January 2003	1.75 m (5 ft 9 in)	Cariduras de Fajardo	(Puerto Rico)
C	11	Sofía Roma	29 – 21 November 1996	1.88 m (6 ft 2 in)	Ganaderas de Hatillo	(Puerto Rico)
G	22	Arella Guirantes	28 – 15 October 1997	1.80 m (5 ft 11 in)	Elitzur Ramla	(Israel)
PG	23	Trinity San Antonio	22 – 28 October 2003	1.74 m (5 ft 9 in)	Basket Landes	(France)
F	25	Denise Solís	24 – 6 October 2001	1.88 m (6 ft 2 in)	Criollas de Caguas	(Puerto Rico)
C	33	India Pagán	27 – 7 January 1999	1.87 m (6 ft 2 in)	Atenienses de Manati	(Puerto Rico)
C	34	Imani McGee-Stafford	31 – 11 October 1994	2.00 m (6 ft 7 in)	Monarcas de Juana Díaz	(Puerto Rico)
G	55	Jacqueline Benítez	29 – 6 June 1997	1.78 m (5 ft 10 in)	Criollas de Caguas	(Puerto Rico)

Head coach

- (Puerto Rico) Jerry Batista

Assistant coach(es)

- (Puerto Rico) Carla Cortijo
- (Puerto Rico) Jorge Otero

Legend

- (C) Team captain
- Club – describes last
  club before the tournament
- Age – describes age
  on 4 September 2026
