= Costa Rica women's national basketball team =

Costa Rica
- FIBA ranking: 75 ▼4 (8 August 2025)
- Joined FIBA: 1969
- FIBA zone: FIBA Americas
- National federation: Federación Costarricense de Baloncesto Aficionado

Olympic Games
- Appearances: None

World Cup
- Appearances: None

FIBA Americas Championship for Women
- Appearances: None
Home	Away

The Costa Rica women's national basketball team is the women's national basketball team of Costa Rica. It is managed by the Federación Costarricense de Baloncesto Aficionado.

The team participated at the 2015 FIBA COCABA Championship for Women.

In mid-2018, the team played against the Queen's Golden Gaels, which Costa Rica ceded 42–66.

== See also ==
- Costa Rica men's national basketball team
- Costa Rica women's national under-17 and under-18 basketball team
- Costa Rica women's national under-15 and under-16 basketball team
- Costa Rica women's national 3x3 team
