= 2011 FIBA Americas Championship for Women =

Basketball competition

2011 FIBA Women's AmeriCup
11th FIBA Women's Americas Basketball Championship

Tournament details
- Host country: Colombia
- Dates: September 24 – October 1
- Teams: 10 (from 44 federations)
- Venue: 1 (in 1 host city)

Final positions
- Champions: Brazil (5th title)

Tournament statistics
- MVP: (Brazil) Érika de Souza
- Top scorer: (Chile) Javiera Novión (Jamaica) Nicole Louden (18.8)
- Top rebounds: (Jamaica) Vanessa Gidden (Mexico) Erika Gómez (8.3)
- Top assists: (Colombia) Erika Valek (5.8)
- PPG (Team): Brazil (79)
- RPG (Team): Brazil (39.8)
- APG (Team): Brazil (16.2)

Official website
- Official Website

The 2011 FIBA Americas Championship for Women was the qualifying tournament for FIBA Americas at the women's basketball tournament at the 2012 Summer Olympics in London. The tournament was held at Coliseo Álvaro Sánchez Silva in Neiva, Colombia from September 24 to October 1. It was the first FIBA Americas Championship for Women to have 10 countries competing.

== Qualification ==
Qualification was done via FIBA Americas' sub-zones. USA Basketball chose not to enter its national team, which sat atop the FIBA World Rankings going into the tournament, because the team had already qualified for the 2012 Olympics by winning the 2010 World Championship. The qualified teams are:

- South American Sub-Zone (FIBA South American Championship for Women 2010):
  - Argentina
  - Brazil
  - Chile
  - Colombia (Host)
  - Paraguay
- North America Sub-Zone:
  - Canada (qualified automatically)
- Central American and Caribbean Zone (2010 Centrobasket for Women):
  - Cuba (qualified automatically)
  - Jamaica
  - Mexico
  - Puerto Rico

== Draw ==
The draw ceremonies were held in Neiva on May 5, 2011 at the Auditorio Rodrigo Lara Bonilla de la Asamblea Departamental del Huila. The results, with the FIBA World Rankings prior to the draw, were:

Group A	Group B
25. Chile; 10. Cuba; 13. Argentina; 33. Puerto Rico; 72. Colombia	49. Jamaica; 6. Brazil; 12. Canada; 27. Mexico; 72. Paraguay

Note: Colombia and Paraguay had 0 ranking points and was therefore ranked after the last ranked team.

== Format ==
- The top two teams from each group advance to the semifinals.
- The winners in the knockout semifinals advance to the Final. The losers play for third place.

=== Tie-breaking criteria ===
Ties are broken via the following the criteria, with the first option used first, all the way down to the last option:

1. Head to head results
2. Goal average (not the goal difference) between the tied teams
3. Goal average of the tied teams for all teams in its group

== Preliminary round ==
=== Group A ===
Qualified for the semifinals
Eliminated in preliminary round

Team	Pts	Pld	W	L	PF	PA	PD
Argentina	8	4	4	0	277	215	+62
Cuba	7	4	3	1	263	222	+41
Puerto Rico	6	4	2	2	243	228	+15
Colombia	5	4	1	3	225	259	–34
Chile	4	4	0	4	191	275	–84

All times local (UTC−5)

September 24
14:30

Report

Puerto Rico	50–67	Cuba
Scoring by quarter: 15–19, 12–7, 14–23, 9–18
Pts: Valentin 15; Rebs: Valentin, Sepúlveda 3 Asts: Vargas 2		Pts: Gelis, Fernández 14; Rebs: Noblet 9 Asts: Gelis 6

Coliseo Álvaro Sánchez Silva, Neiva

September 24
21:15

Report

Chile	50–69	Colombia
Scoring by quarter: 15–13, 9–19, 11–20, 15–17
Pts: Novión 19; Rebs: Novión 10; Asts: three players 2		Pts: Mosquera 19; Rebs: Mosquera 8 Asts: Valek 6

Coliseo Álvaro Sánchez Silva, Neiva

September 25
19:00

Report

Argentina	80–50	Chile
Scoring by quarter: 10–13, 25–8, 27–15, 18–14
Pts: Sánchez 15; Rebs: Pavón 7 Asts: Santana, Pavón 3		Pts: Novión 15; Rebs: Novión 5 Asts: Novión 4

Coliseo Álvaro Sánchez Silva, Neiva

September 25
21:15

Report

Colombia	46–68	Puerto Rico
Scoring by quarter: 4–20, 22–16, 11–17, 9–15
Pts: Valek 13; Rebs: Torres 7 Asts: Valek 8		Pts: Valentin 24; Rebs: Plácido 9 Asts: Cortijo 5

Coliseo Álvaro Sánchez Silva, Neiva

September 26
19:00

Report

Puerto Rico	61–66	Argentina
Scoring by quarter: 25–15, 10–14, 19–20, 7–17
Pts: Sepúlveda 15; Rebs: Sepúlveda 6 Asts: Cortijo 4		Pts: Sánchez 27; Rebs: Burani 9 Asts: Pavón 4

Coliseo Álvaro Sánchez Silva, Neiva

September 26
21:15

Report

Cuba	75–65	Colombia
Scoring by quarter: 15–15, 16–16, 22–19, 22–15
Pts: Gelis 22; Rebs: Cepeda 10; Asts: Gelis 5		Pts: Valek 22; Rebs: Valek 11; Asts: Valek 6

Coliseo Álvaro Sánchez Silva, Neiva

September 27
19:00

Report

Chile	49–64	Puerto Rico
Scoring by quarter: 19–19, 5–12, 16–22, 9–11
Pts: Novión 22; Rebs: Gamboa 6 Asts: Troncoso 2		Pts: Plácido 13; Rebs: Sepúlveda 8 Asts: Rosado 5

Coliseo Álvaro Sánchez Silva, Neiva

September 27
21:15

Report

Argentina	65–59	Cuba
Scoring by quarter: 14–13, 15–17, 11–17, 25–12
Pts: Cava 18; Rebs: Pavón 7 Asts: three players 2		Pts: Gelis, Amargo 11; Rebs: Cepeda 10; Asts: Gelis 3

Coliseo Álvaro Sánchez Silva, Neiva

September 28
16:45

Report

Cuba	62–42	Chile
Scoring by quarter: 19–6, 17–16, 15–7, 11–13
Pts: Fernández 13; Rebs: Cepeda 12; Asts: three players 2		Pts: Novión 19; Rebs: Novión 5 Asts: Novión 5

Coliseo Álvaro Sánchez Silva, Neiva

September 28
21:15

Report

Colombia	45–66	Argentina
Scoring by quarter: 11–16, 11–16, 8–20, 15–14
Pts: Valek 12; Rebs: Díaz 10; Asts: Valek, Martínez 3		Pts: González 14; Rebs: Cabrera 8 Asts: González 4

Coliseo Álvaro Sánchez Silva, Neiva

=== Group B ===
Qualified for the semifinals
Eliminated in preliminary round

Team	Pts	Pld	W	L	PF	PA	PD	Tie
Brazil	8	4	4	0	334	184	+150	
Canada	7	4	3	1	254	176	+78	
Mexico	5	4	1	3	257	273	–16	1–1, 1.336
Jamaica	5	4	1	3	237	274	–37	1–1, 1.022
Paraguay	5	4	1	3	175	350	–175	1–1, 0.737

All times local (UTC−5)

September 24
16:45

Report

Brazil	117–34	Paraguay
Scoring by quarter: 28–5, 27–9, 35–7, 27–13
Pts: de Souza 18; Rebs: de Souza 8 Asts: Dantas 5		Pts: T. Insfrán 12; Rebs: Pérez 4 Asts: six players 1

Coliseo Álvaro Sánchez Silva, Neiva

September 24
19:00

Report

Mexico	45–72	Canada
Scoring by quarter: 4–19, 5–16, 16–12, 20–25
Pts: Gómez 18; Rebs: Castro, Gómez 8 Asts: Silva, García 2		Pts: Keane 15; Rebs: Gabriele 6 Asts: Thorburn, Aubry 3

Coliseo Álvaro Sánchez Silva, Neiva

September 25
14:30

Report

Jamaica	69–64	Mexico
Scoring by quarter: 20–9, 17–26, 18–18, 14–11
Pts: Gidden 28; Rebs: Edwards 12; Asts: Edwards, Louden 3		Pts: Gómez 21; Rebs: three players 7 Asts: Ramírez, Silva 3

Coliseo Álvaro Sánchez Silva, Neiva

September 25
16:45

Report

Canada	39–56	Brazil
Scoring by quarter: 8–8, 12–15, 9–23, 10–10
Pts: Ayim 10; Rebs: Tatham 5 Asts: Gabriele 3		Pts: Dantas 13; Rebs: Dantas 11; Asts: de Oliveira 3

Coliseo Álvaro Sánchez Silva, Neiva

September 26
14:30

Report

Paraguay	26–77	Canada
Scoring by quarter: 6–22, 11–20, 5–19, 4–16
Pts: Peña 7 Rebs: R. Insfrán 7 Asts: Pérez 2		Pts: Keane 15; Rebs: Tatham 8 Asts: Gabriele 5

Coliseo Álvaro Sánchez Silva, Neiva

September 26
16:45

Report

Brazil	73–50	Jamaica
Scoring by quarter: 22–13, 16–12, 18–9, 17–16
Pts: de Souza 19; Rebs: de Souza 7 Asts: Pinto 7		Pts: Gidden 23; Rebs: Gidden 10; Asts: Gidden 2

Coliseo Álvaro Sánchez Silva, Neiva

September 27
14:30

Report

Jamaica	69–71	Paraguay
Scoring by quarter: 10–21, 20–15, 21–19, 18–16
Pts: Louden 24; Rebs: Gidden 9 Asts: Louden 3		Pts: Caraves 21; Rebs: Peña, Fernández 5 Asts: Ghiringhelli 3

Coliseo Álvaro Sánchez Silva, Neiva

September 27
16:45

Report

Mexico	61–88	Brazil
Scoring by quarter: 11–24, 13–21, 13–20, 24–23
Pts: Castro 17; Rebs: Castro 8 Asts: Castro 4		Pts: de Souza 22; Rebs: three players 6 Asts: Pinto 4

Coliseo Álvaro Sánchez Silva, Neiva

September 28
14:30

Report

Paraguay	44–87	Mexico
Scoring by quarter: 4–16, 13–24, 16–28, 11–19
Pts: T. Insfrán 12; Rebs: Fernández 10; Asts: Ghiringhelli 4		Pts: Silva 21; Rebs: Gómez 12; Asts: Ramírez 6

Coliseo Álvaro Sánchez Silva, Neiva

September 28
19:00

Report

Canada	66–49	Jamaica
Scoring by quarter: 15–13, 18–12, 17–9, 16–15
Pts: Smith 13; Rebs: Gabriele 7 Asts: Gabriele 4		Pts: Louden 22; Rebs: Gidden 5 Asts: Gidden 2

Coliseo Álvaro Sánchez Silva, Neiva

== Final round ==
Semi-finals
September 30
Argentina	61
Canada	59
September 30
Brazil	66
Cuba	53

Final
October 1
Argentina	33
Brazil	74
Third place
October 1
Canada	59
Cuba	46

=== Semifinals ===
September 30
18:00

Report

Argentina	61–59	Canada
Scoring by quarter: 23–10, 13–18, 7–12, 18–19
Pts: Reggiardo 18; Rebs: Sánchez 10; Asts: Pavón 3		Pts: Aubry 14; Rebs: Murphy 7 Asts: Thorburn 6

Coliseo Álvaro Sánchez Silva, Neiva

September 30
20:15

Report

Brazil	66–53	Cuba
Scoring by quarter: 24–16, 14–10, 14–15, 14–12
Pts: de Souza 20; Rebs: Pinto 13; Asts: Pinto 12		Pts: Amargo 16; Rebs: Gelis, Cepeda 5 Asts: three players 2

Coliseo Álvaro Sánchez Silva, Neiva

=== Third place game ===
October 1
18:00

Report

Canada	59–46	Cuba
Scoring by quarter: 13–8, 11–11, 19–11, 16–16
Pts: Gabriele, Smith 13; Rebs: Aubry 7 Asts: Thorburn 4		Pts: Noblet 12; Rebs: Noblet 5 Asts: three players 1

Coliseo Álvaro Sánchez Silva, Neiva

=== Final ===
October 1
20:15

Report

Argentina	33–74	Brazil
Scoring by quarter: 4–16, 7–17, 8–26, 14–15
Pts: Sánchez 12; Rebs: Sánchez 11; Asts: four players 1		Pts: de Souza 13; Rebs: de Souza 16; Asts: Pinto, de Souza 3

Coliseo Álvaro Sánchez Silva, Neiva

== Awards ==
2011 Tournament of the Americas for Women winners

Brazil
Fifth title

== Statistical leaders ==
=== Individual Tournament Highs ===
Points

Pos.	Name	PPG
1	(Chile) Javiera Novión	18.8
1	(Jamaica) Nicole Louden	18.8
3	(Mexico) Erika Gómez	18.5
4	(Jamaica) Vanessa Gidden	18.3
5	(Brazil) Érika de Souza	16.2
6	(Puerto Rico) Cynthia Valentín	14.8
7	(Colombia) Erika Valek	14.5
8	(Argentina) Erika Sánchez	14.3
9	(Cuba) Oyanaisis Gelis	12.0
10	(Cuba) Clenia Noblet	11.5

Rebounds

Pos.	Name	RPG
1	(Jamaica) Vanessa Gidden	8.3
1	(Mexico) Erika Gómez	8.3
3	(Brazil) Érika de Souza	8.0
4	(Mexico) Alexis Castro	8.0
5	(Cuba) Marlen Cepeda	7.8
6	(Jamaica) Simone Edwards	6.8
7	(Cuba) Clenia Noblet	6.5
8	(Argentina) Agostina Burani	6.0
9	(Brazil) Damiris Dantas	5.8
10	(Argentina) Sandra Pavón	5.3

Assists

Pos.	Name	APG
1	(Colombia) Erika Valek	5.8
2	(Brazil) Adriana Moisés Pinto	5.2
3	(Canada) Shona Thorburn	3.3
4	(Cuba) Oyanaisis Gelis	3.0
5	(Puerto Rico) Carla Cortijo	3.0
6	(Mexico) Taine Ramírez	2.8
7	(Canada) Teresa Gabriele	2.7
8	(Argentina) Sandra Pavón	2.3
9	(Brazil) Patrícia de Oliveira	2.2
10	(Argentina) Débora González	2.0

Steals

Pos.	Name	SPG
1	(Colombia) Erika Valek	2.3
2	(Brazil) Patrícia de Oliveira	2.0
3	(Canada) Courtnay Pilypaitis	1.8
4	(Brazil) Adriana Moisés Pinto	1.7
5	(Cuba) Ineidis Casanova	1.7
6	(Argentina) Sandra Pavón	1.7
7	(Brazil) Palmira Marçal	1.5
8	(Cuba) Yamara Amargo	1.3
9	(Cuba) Clenia Noblet	1.3
10	(Brazil) Micaela Jacintho	1.3

Blocks

Pos.	Name	BPG
1	(Canada) Miranda Ayin	1.2
2	(Colombia) Tathiana Mosquera	1.0
3	(Puerto Rico) Esmary Vargas	1.0
4	(Brazil) Érika de Souza	0.8
5	(Puerto Rico) María Plácido	0.8
6	(Paraguay) Lida Fernández	0.8
7	(Colombia) Levys Torres	0.8
8	(Argentina) Agostina Burani	0.7
9	(Brazil) Damiris Dantas	0.7
10	(Cuba) Oyanaisis Gelis	0.5

== Final ranking ==
Qualified for the 2012 Summer Olympics.
Qualified for the 2012 FIBA World Olympic Qualifying Tournament for Women.

Rank	Team	Record
1st place, gold medalist(s)	Brazil	6–0
2nd place, silver medalist(s)	Argentina	5–1
3rd place, bronze medalist(s)	Canada	4–2
4	Cuba	3–3
5	Puerto Rico	2–2
6	Mexico	1–3
7	Colombia	1–3
8	Jamaica	1–3
9	Paraguay	1–3
10	Chile	0–4

- Cuba renounced to compete in the World Olympic Qualifying Tournament for Women. In these circumstances, the FIBA has chosen Puerto Rico, the best team in the Americas Championship after Cuba.

1st	2nd	3rd	4th
Brazil Adriana Moisés Pinto; Palmira Marçal; Patrícia "Chuca" de Oliveira; Micaela Jacintho; Bárbara Generoso; Franciele Nascimento; Silvia Cristina Gustavo; Clarissa dos Santos; Damiris Dantas; Nádia Colhado; Érika de Souza; Gilmara Justino	Argentina Stephany Thomas; Ornella Santana; Paula Reggiardo; Diana Cabrera; Débora González; Marina Cava; Agostina Burani; Melisa Gretter; Sandra Pavón; Melani Soriani; Erica Sánchez; Melisa Pavicich	Canada Krista Phillips; Teresa Gabriele; Shona Thorburn; Courtnay Pilypaitis; Kim Smith; Kadie Riverin; Alisha Tathan; Kalisha Keane; Lizanne Murphy; Tamara Tathan; Chelsea Aubry; Miranda Ayim	Cuba Islen Carbonell; Ineidis Casanova; Lisdeyvis Martínez; Oyanaisis Gelis; Edith Thompson; Yamara Amargo; Lazara Moises; Marlen Cepeda; Clenia Noblet; Taimy Fernández; Leidys Oquendo; Suchitel Ávila

== See also ==
- 2011 FIBA Americas Championship
