= 2015 FIBA Americas Women's Championship Rosters =

The following is a list of squads for each nation competing at the 2015 FIBA Americas Women's Championship

== Pool A ==
=== Canada ===
Canada women's national basketball team - 2015 FIBA Americas Women's Championship roster
Players
Coaches

Pos.	No.	Name	Age – Date of birth	Height	Club
G	4	Miah-Marie Langolis	23 – 21 September 1991	1.70 m (5 ft 7 in)	Dynamo Guvd Novosibirsk	(Russia)
G	5	Kia Nurse	19 – 22 February 1996	1.77 m (5 ft 10 in)	Connecticut Huskies	(United States)
G	6	Shona Thorburn	33 – 7 August 1982	1.75 m (5 ft 9 in)	Nantes Reze Basket	(France)
F	7	Nayo Raincock-Ekunwe	24 – 2 August 1991	1.87 m (6 ft 2 in)	TSV 1880 Wasserburg	(Germany)
G	8	Kim Gaucher	31 – 7 May 1984	1.80 m (5 ft 11 in)	Lattes Montpellier	(France)
F	9	Miranda Ayim	27 – 6 May 1988	1.87 m (6 ft 2 in)	Basket Landres	(France)
G	10	Nirra Fields	21 – 3 December 1993	1.70 m (5 ft 7 in)	UCLA Bruins	(United States)
F	11	Natalie Achonwa	22 – 22 November 1992	1.90 m (6 ft 3 in)	Indiana Fever	(United States)
F	12	Lizanne Murphy	31 – 15 March 1984	1.82 m (6 ft 0 in)	UF Angers Basket	(France)
F	13	Tamara Tatham	29 – 19 August 1985	1.82 m (6 ft 0 in)	Piešťanské Čajky	(Slovakia)
F	14	Katherine Plouffe	22 – 15 September 1992	1.90 m (6 ft 3 in)	Nantes Reze Basket	(France)
F	15	Michelle Plouffe	22 – 15 September 1992	1.90 m (6 ft 3 in)	Lattes Montpellier	(France)

Head coach

- Lisa Thomaidis

Legend

- Club – describes last
  club before the tournament
- Age – describes age
  on 9 August 2015

=== Cuba ===
Cuba women's national basketball team – 2015 FIBA Americas Women's Championship roster
Players
Coaches

Pos.	No.	Name	Age – Date of birth	Height	Club
F	4	Ochoa, Fransy	24 – 13 Sep 1990	1.84 m (6 ft 0 in)	(Cuba) Villa Clara
G	5	Casanova, Ineidis	26 – 13 Oct 1988	1.68 m (5 ft 6 in)	Santiago de Cuba
F	6	Galindo, Anisleidy	26 – 29 Jan 1989	1.80 m (5 ft 11 in)	(Cuba) Pinar del Rio
G	7	Gelis, Oyanaisy	31 – 21 Oct 1983	1.72 m (5 ft 8 in)	(Cuba) Habana
G	8	Romero, Arlenys	31 – 7 Feb 1984	1.76 m (5 ft 9 in)	(Cuba) Pinar del Rio
F	9	Amargo, Yamara	30 – 28 Jun 1985	1.77 m (5 ft 10 in)	(Cuba) Sancti Spiritus
F	10	Povea, Arlety	30 – 7 Oct 1984	1.86 m (6 ft 1 in)	(Cuba) Pinar del Rio
C	11	Cepeda, Marlene	29 – 27 Oct 1985	1.85 m (6 ft 1 in)	Santiago de Cuba
F	12	Noblet, Clenia	28 – 6 May 1987	1.84 m (6 ft 0 in)	(Cuba) Guantanamo
C	13	Aties, Zuleira	34 – 9 Oct 1980	1.91 m (6 ft 3 in)	(Cuba) Habana
F	14	Oquendo, Leidys	33 – 23 Jul 1982	1.77 m (5 ft 10 in)	(Cuba) Camaguey
F	15	Avila, Suchitel	32 – 1 Sep 1982	1.83 m (6 ft 0 in)	(Cuba) Habana

Head coach

- Zabala, Alberto

Assistant coach(es)

- Moya, Eduardo

Legend

- Age – as of 8 August 2015
- Club – before start of Games

=== Puerto Rico ===
Puerto Rico women's national basketball team – 2015 FIBA Americas Championship roster
Players
Coaches

Pos.	No.	Name	Age – Date of birth	Height	Club
	4	Zapata, Juladyy	–
	5	Morton, Johanna	–
	6	Diaz, Jennifer	–
	7	Paniagua, Andreina	–
	8	Alvarez, Vanessa	–
	9	Martinez, Genesis	–
	10	Beltre, Viviane	–
	11	Soto, Marian	–
	13	Peguero, Gisell	–
	14	Hernandez, Cheisy	–
	15	Sierra, Sugeiry	–

Head coach

- Gonzalez, Omar

Assistant coach(es)

- Cintron, Raymond

== Pool B ==
=== Argentina ===
Argentina women's national basketball team - 2015 FIBA Americas Women's Championship roster
Players
Coaches

Pos.	No.	Name	Age – Date of birth	Height	Club
F	4	Macarena Rosset	24 – 23 February 1991	1.74 m (5 ft 9 in)	Atlético Peñarol	(Argentina)
C	5	Ornella Santana	24 – 17 September 1990	1.80 m (5 ft 11 in)	Deportivo Berazategui	(Argentina)
F	7	Diana Cabrera	22 – 7 August 1993	1.85 m (6 ft 1 in)	Union Florida	(Argentina)
SF	8	Andrea Boquete	24 – 24 September 1990	1.80 m (5 ft 11 in)	Deportivo Berazategui	(Argentina)
C	9	Celia Fiorotto	23 – 2 June 1992	1.83 m (6 ft 0 in)	Santa Maria	(Ecuador)
PF	10	Agostina Burani	23 – 4 October 1991	1.86 m (6 ft 1 in)	Unión Florida	(Argentina)
PG	11	Melissa Gretter	22 – 24 January 1993	1.67 m (5 ft 6 in)	Unión Florida	(Argentina)
G	12	Sandra Pavón	30 – 1 June 1985	1.79 m (5 ft 10 in)	Velez Sarsfield	(Argentina)
SF	13	Débora González	25 – 10 January 1990	1.70 m (5 ft 7 in)	Passalacqua	(Italy)
C	17	Gisela Vega	33 – 14 March 1982	1.85 m (6 ft 1 in)	Unión Florida	(Argentina)
F	21	Sthefany Thomas	26 – 4 May 1989	1.75 m (5 ft 9 in)	Uruguay Unemi	(Ecuador)
PF	44	Victoria Llorente	19 – 5 June 1996	1.85 m (6 ft 1 in)	Atlético Lanus	(Argentina)

Head coach

- Christian Santander

Assistant coach(es)

- Carlos Osvaldo Gomez
- Sebastian Alfredo Silva

Legend

- Club – describes last played
  club before the tournament
- Age – describes age
  on 13 June 2016

=== Brazil ===
Brazil women's national basketball team - 2015 FIBA Americas Women's Championship roster
Players
Coaches

Pos.	No.	Name	Age – Date of birth	Height	Club
G	4	Izabella Sangalli	36 – 6 December 1978	1.65 m (5 ft 5 in)	América Basquete	(Brazil)
G	5	Débora Costa	23 – 12 August 1991	1.64 m (5 ft 5 in)	América Basquete	(Brazil)
G	6	Tainá Paixão	23 – 29 November 1991	1.73 m (5 ft 8 in)	América Basquete	(Brazil)
G	7	Patrícia Teixeira	24 – 28 September 1990	1.78 m (5 ft 10 in)	São José	(Brazil)
F	8	Izi Castro Marques	33 – 13 March 1982	1.81 m (5 ft 11 in)	Maranhão Basquete	(Brazil)
G	9	Jaqueline de Paula	29 – 17 February 1986	1.79 m (5 ft 10 in)	Santo André	(Brazil)
C	10	Gilmara Justino	34 – 13 March 1981	1.83 m (6 ft 0 in)	Catanduva	(Brazil)
PG	11	Izabela Nicoletti	16 – 9 August 1999	1.80 m (5 ft 11 in)	Carolina Waves	(United States)
C	12	Karina Jacob	29 – 17 February 1986	1.85 m (6 ft 1 in)	São José	(Brazil)
C	13	Nádia Colhado	26 – 25 February 1989	1.93 m (6 ft 4 in)	Atlanta Dream	(United States)
F	14	Isabela Ramona	21 – 23 January 1994	1.79 m (5 ft 10 in)	São José	(Brazil)
C	15	Kelly Santos	36 – 10 November 1979	1.93 m (6 ft 4 in)	América Basquete	(Brazil)

Head coach

- Luiz Augusto Zanon

Assistant coach(es)

- Cristiano Cedra;

Legend

- Club – describes last
  club before the tournament
- Age – describes age
  on 8 August 2015

=== Venezuela ===
Venezuela women's national basketball team - 2015 FIBA Americas Women's Championship roster
Players
Coaches

Pos.	No.	Name	Age – Date of birth	Height	Club
C	4	Mayerling Landaeta	22 – 25 January 1993	1.82 m (6 ft 0 in)	Deportivo Anzoátegui	(Venezuela)
SG	5	Roselis Silva	24 – 1 August 1991	1.65 m (5 ft 5 in)	Deportivo Anzoátegui	(Venezuela)
PF	6	Yosimar Corrales	25 – 5 February 1990	1.80 m (5 ft 11 in)	Uruguay Unemi	(Ecuador)
C	7	Ana García	32 – 24 November 1982	1.92 m (6 ft 4 in)	Deportivo Anzoátegui	(Venezuela)
F	8	Ivaney Marquez	32 – 17 March 1983	1.79 m (5 ft 10 in)	Uruguay Unemi	(Ecuador)
F	9	Daniela Wallen	20 – 4 April 1995	1.77 m (5 ft 10 in)	Deportivo Anzoátegui	(Venezuela)
SG	10	Luisana Ortega	25 – 25 September 1989	1.73 m (5 ft 8 in)	Deportivo Anzoátegui	(Venezuela)
PG	11	Mariana Duran	22 – 12 May 1993	1.68 m (5 ft 6 in)	Deportivo Anzoátegui	(Venezuela)
F	12	Cleyder Blanco	25 – 27 September 1989	1.83 m (6 ft 0 in)	Deportivo Anzoátegui	(Venezuela)
C	13	Marielka Garate	20 – 7 February 1995	1.83 m (6 ft 0 in)	Deportivo Anzoátegui	(Venezuela)
C	16	Cynthia Añez	29 – 26 November 1985	1.83 m (6 ft 0 in)	Deportivo Anzoátegui	(Venezuela)
PF	17	Mirna Araujo	28 – 17 February 1987	1.83 m (6 ft 0 in)	Barinas	(Venezuela)

Head coach

- Oscar Silva

Assistant coach(es)

- Brickman Morales
- David Sequera

Legend

- Club – describes last played
  club before the tournament
- Age – describes age
  on 13 June 2016
