= Basketball at the 2015 Pan American Games – Women's tournament =

Tournament details
- Host country: Canada
- Dates: July 16 – 20
- Teams: 8 (from 8 federations)
- Venue: 1 (in 1 host city)

Final positions
- Champions: Canada (1st title)

The women's basketball tournament at the 2015 Pan American Games was held in Toronto, Canada at the Ryerson Athletic Centre from July 16 to 20.

For these Games, the women competed in an 8-team tournament. The teams were grouped into two pools of four teams each for a round-robin preliminary round. The top two teams in each group will advance to a single elimination bracket.

Puerto Rico are the defending champions from the 2011 Pan American Games in Guadalajara, defeating Mexico, 85–67 in the final.

The official detailed schedule for the tournament was announced on February 5, 2015.

Canada won the tournament for the first time, becoming the first host nation to win the gold medal since the United States in 1987.

== Qualification ==
A total of eight women's teams qualified to compete at the games. The top three teams at the South American and Central American and Caribbean Championships will qualify for each respective tournament. The host nation (Canada) along with the United States automatically qualified a teams for the event.

=== Summary ===
Event	Date	Location	Vacancies	Qualified
Host Nation	—N/a	—N/a	1	Canada
Qualified automatically	—N/a	—N/a	1	United States
2014 Centrobasket Women	July 22–26	(Mexico) Monterrey	3	Cuba; Puerto Rico; Dominican Republic
2014 South American Basketball Championship for Women	August 14–18	(Ecuador) Ambato	3	Brazil; Argentina; Venezuela
Total			8	

== Medalists ==
Event	Gold	Silver	Bronze
Women	Canada	United States	Cuba

== Draw ==
Pots one through three were based on each team's finish at their respective qualification tournament. Pot 1 consisted of the champions, pot 2 the runners-up and pot 3 contained the third placed teams. Pot 4 contained the host nation, Canada and the United States. Teams were placed into groups using a random draw (with each group receiving one team per pot). The draw was held in San Juan, Puerto Rico on December 16, 2014. Canada as host nation were able to select their group after the first three pots were drawn. This automatically placed the United States into the group Canada did not select.

Pot 1	Pot 2	Pot 3	Pot 4
Cuba (13); Brazil (7)	Puerto Rico (28); Argentina (14)	Venezuela (34); Dominican Republic (37)	Canada (10); United States (1)

- Latest FIBA World Rankings (September 2014) per team is shown in brackets.

== Rosters ==
At the start of tournament, all eight participating countries had up to 12 players on their rosters.

- Argentina
- Brazil
- Canada
- Cuba
- Dominican Republic
- Puerto Rico
- United States
- Venezuela

== Results ==
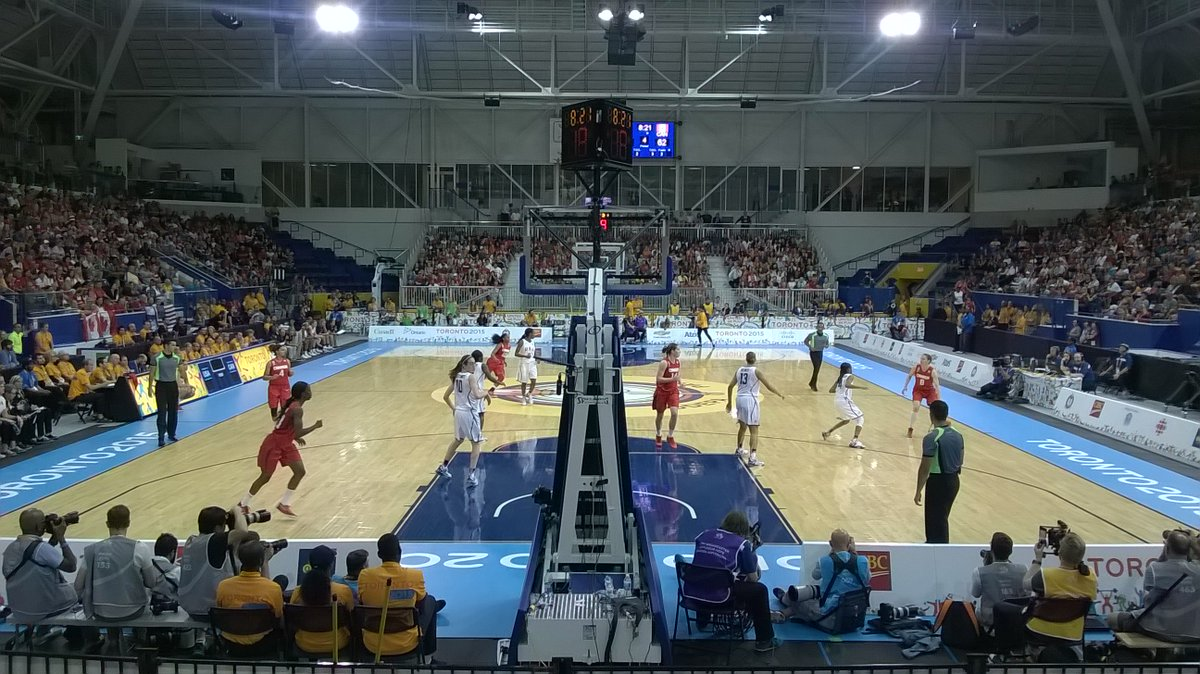
The Ryerson Athletic Centre, was the venue for the basketball competitions

All times are Eastern Daylight Time (UTC−4)

=== Preliminary round ===
==== Group A ====
Team	Pld	W	L	PF	PA	PD	Pts	Qualification
United States	3	3	0	262	201	+61	6	Qualified for the semifinals
Brazil	3	2	1	204	186	+18	5	Qualified for the semifinals
Puerto Rico	3	1	2	210	209	+1	4	
Dominican Republic	3	0	3	163	243	−80	3	

16 July 2015
13:30

Report

Puerto Rico	76–54	Dominican Republic
Scoring by quarter: 25–14, 24–14, 13–19, 14–7
Pts: Cortijo Sanchez 15; Rebs: Cortijo Sanchez 8 Asts: Sepúlveda, Cortijo Sanchez 3		Pts: Monsac 16; Rebs: Andujar 7 Asts: Monsac 3

Ryerson Athletic Centre, Toronto
Referees: Juan Fernández (ARG)

16 July 2015
21:00

Report

United States	75–69	Brazil
Scoring by quarter: 25–17, 14–14, 18–19, 18–19
Pts: Stewart 26; Rebs: Stewart 12; Asts: Jefferson 3		Pts: Teixeira 18; Rebs: Santos 11; Asts: Teixeira 2

Ryerson Athletic Centre, Toronto

17 July 2015
13:30

Report

Puerto Rico	57–62	Brazil
Scoring by quarter: 14–20, 12–11, 14–15, 17–16
Pts: Cortijo Sanchez 20; Rebs: Bermudez 7 Asts: Cortijo Sanchez 2		Pts: de Paula 13; Rebs: Jacob 10; Asts: Teixeira, Santos 2

Ryerson Athletic Centre, Toronto

17 July 2015
21:00

Report

Dominican Republic	55–94	United States
Scoring by quarter: 6–32, 15–16, 16–27, 18–19
Pts: Guzman 14; Rebs: Martinez 7 Asts: Guzman, Martinez 3		Pts: Stewart 16; Rebs: Reimer, Brunner 6 Asts: Plum 5

Ryerson Athletic Centre, Toronto

18 July 2015
13:30

Report

Brazil	73–54	Dominican Republic
Scoring by quarter: 24–10, 19–12, 15–17, 15–15
Pts: de Paula, Justino 17; Rebs: Carcavalli, Justino, Macedo 5 Asts: Carcavalli 4		Pts: Monsac 17; Rebs: Martinez, Andujar 6 Asts: Martinez 3

Ryerson Athletic Centre, Toronto

18 July 2015
21:00

Report

United States	93–77	Puerto Rico
Scoring by quarter: 24–23, 22–18, 21–23, 26–13
Pts: Stewart 24; Rebs: Coates 13; Asts: Jefferson 6		Pts: Cortijo Sanchez 24; Rebs: Gibson, García, Martinez 3 Asts: Cortijo Sanchez 5

Ryerson Athletic Centre, Toronto

==== Group B ====
Team	Pld	W	L	PF	PA	PD	Pts	Qualification
Canada	3	3	0	245	164	+81	6	Qualified for the semifinals
Cuba	3	2	1	209	188	+21	5	Qualified for the semifinals
Argentina	3	1	2	200	209	−9	4	
Venezuela	3	0	3	168	261	−93	3	

16 July 2015
10:30

Report

Cuba	68–55	Argentina
Scoring by quarter: 23–12, 13–14, 14–17, 18–12
Pts: Amargo 17; Rebs: Noblet 9 Asts: Amargo 3		Pts: González 15; Rebs: Vega 7 Asts: Boquete 6

Ryerson Athletic Centre, Toronto

16 July 2015
18:00

Report

Canada	101–38	Venezuela
Scoring by quarter: 23–8, 25–11, 29–16, 24–3
Pts: Murphy 15; Rebs: Murphy 9 Asts: Langlois 6		Pts: Silva Serrano 13; Rebs: Perez Abreu 5 Asts: Garate Martinez 2

Ryerson Athletic Centre, Toronto

17 July 2015
10:30

Report

Venezuela	62–73	Cuba
Scoring by quarter: 18–21, 16–13, 11–20, 17–19
Pts: Silva Serrano 22; Rebs: Blanco Piñango, Perez Abreu 9 Asts: Wallen Morillo 2		Pts: Amargo 18; Rebs: Oquendo 12; Asts: Casanova 8

Ryerson Athletic Centre, Toronto

17 July 2015
18:00

Report

Argentina	58–73	Canada
Scoring by quarter: 6–19, 15–9, 23–19, 14–26
Pts: Boquete, Gretter, Thomas Diaz 8 Rebs: Gretter, Pavón, Thomas Diaz 3 Asts: four players 1		Pts: Ayim, Tatham 12; Rebs: Langlois 6 Asts: four players 2

Ryerson Athletic Centre, Toronto

18 July 2015
10:30

Report

Argentina	87–68	Venezuela
Scoring by quarter: 23–15, 16–13, 21–22, 27–18
Pts: Boquete 18; Rebs: Santana 9 Asts: Gretter 7		Pts: Silva Serrano 20; Rebs: Perez Abreu 8 Asts: Marquez Agudo 3

Ryerson Athletic Centre, Toronto

18 July 2015
18:00

Report

Canada	71–68	Cuba
Scoring by quarter: 20–18, 20–17, 20–13, 11–20
Pts: Achonwa 15; Rebs: Achonwa 7 Asts: Langlois, Tatham 4		Pts: Gelis 18; Rebs: Noblet 9 Asts: Casanova, Gelis 3

Ryerson Athletic Centre, Toronto

=== Classification round ===
==== Seventh place match ====
19 July 2015
10:30

Report

Dominican Republic	56–72	Venezuela
Scoring by quarter: 18–23, 18–19, 7–20, 13–10
Pts: Monsac 13; Rebs: Monsac 13; Asts: Zapata 3		Pts: Silva Serrano 31; Rebs: Corrales Gomez 9 Asts: Perez Abreu 13

Ryerson Athletic Centre, Toronto

==== Fifth place match ====
19 July 2015
21:00

Report

Puerto Rico	56–77	Argentina
Scoring by quarter: 10–19, 14–15, 19–22, 13–21
Pts: Delgado 19; Rebs: Bermudez, García 9 Asts: Delgado 2		Pts: Vega 18; Rebs: Vega 9 Asts: Gretter 8

Ryerson Athletic Centre, Toronto

=== Knockout round ===
Semifinals
July 19 — Toronto
United States	65
Cuba	64
July 19 — Toronto
Brazil	63
Canada	91

Final
July 20 — Toronto
United States	73
Canada	81
Third place
July 20 — Toronto
Cuba	66
Brazil	62

==== Semifinals ====
19 July 2015
13:30

Report

Cuba	64–65	United States
Scoring by quarter: 17–18, 20–8, 11–20, 16–19
Pts: Casanova, Noblet 15; Rebs: Ochoa, Noblet 10; Asts: Gelis 3		Pts: Harper 16; Rebs: Coates 15; Asts: Jefferson 5

Ryerson Athletic Centre, Toronto

19 July 2015
18:00

Report

Brazil	63–91	Canada
Scoring by quarter: 9–22, 12–13, 18–33, 24–23
Pts: Macedo 16; Rebs: Macedo 11; Asts: Costa 4		Pts: Fields 15; Rebs: K Plouffe 10; Asts: Thorburn 8

Ryerson Athletic Centre, Toronto

==== Bronze medal match ====
20 July 2015
16:00

Report

(bronze) Cuba	66–62	Brazil
Scoring by quarter: 14–16, 23–16, 12–16, 17–14
Pts: Casanova 18; Rebs: Noblet 14; Asts: Casanova 4		Pts: Paixão 16; Rebs: Santos 7 Asts: Paixão 4

Ryerson Athletic Centre, Toronto

==== Gold medal match ====
20 July 2015
20:45

Report

(silver) United States	73–81	Canada (gold)
Scoring by quarter: 23–13, 13–23, 15–26, 22–19
Pts: Stewart 17; Rebs: Stewart 11; Asts: Jefferson 2		Pts: Nurse 33; Rebs: Fields 7 Asts: Nurse, Tatham 3

Ryerson Athletic Centre, Toronto

== Final standings ==
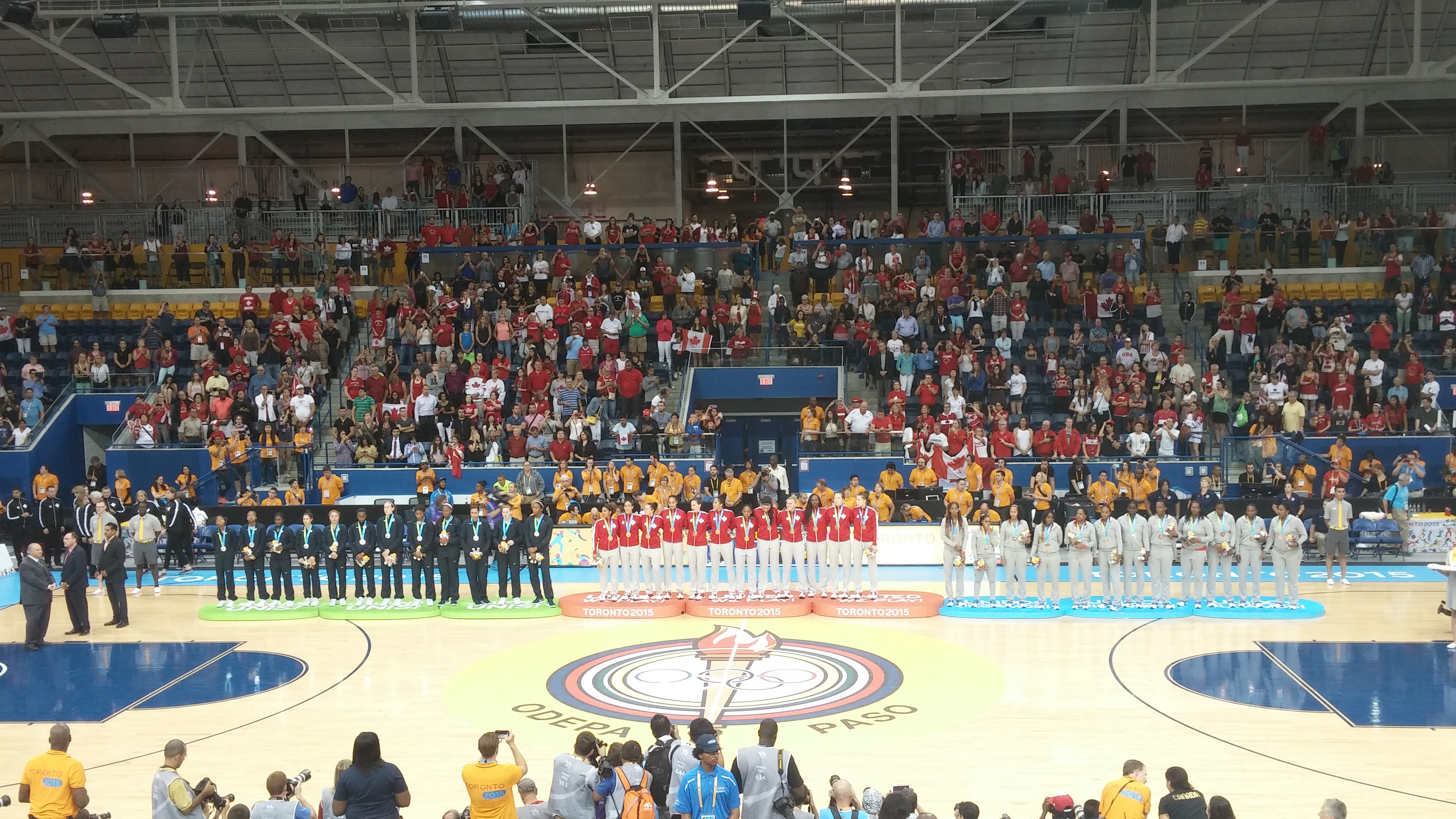
The women's podium

Rank	Team	Record
1st place, gold medalist(s)	Canada	5–0
2nd place, silver medalist(s)	United States	4–1
3rd place, bronze medalist(s)	Cuba	3–2
4	Brazil	2–3
5	Argentina	2–2
6	Puerto Rico	1–3
7	Venezuela	1–3
8	Dominican Republic	0–4
