= Basketball at the 2011 Pan American Games – Women's tournament =

Basketball – Women's tournament at the 2011 Pan American Games
- Venue: CODE Dome
- Dates: October 21 – October 25
- Competitors: 95 from 8 nations

Medalists
Gold medal	Puerto Rico
Silver medal	Mexico
Bronze medal	Brazil

The women's tournament of basketball at the 2011 Pan American Games in Guadalajara, Mexico began on October 21 and ended on October 25, when Puerto Rico defeated Mexico 85–67 for the gold medal. All games were held at the CODE Dome. The defending champions was the United States.

== Qualification ==
Three teams automatically qualified to compete in this tournament, the hosts Mexico, Canada and the United States. The rest qualified through two regional tournaments.

Event	Date	Location	Vacancies	Qualified
Host Nation	–	–	1	Mexico
Automatic Qualification			2	Canada; United States
2010 Centrobasket Women	July 12–16, 2010	(Puerto Rico) Mayagüez	2	Puerto Rico; Jamaica
FIBA South American Championship for Women 2010	Aug 10 – Aug 14, 2010	(Chile) Santiago	3	Brazil; Argentina; Colombia
TOTAL			8	

== Format ==
- Eight teams are split into 2 preliminary round groups of 4 teams each. The top 2 teams from each group qualify for the knockout stage.
- The third and fourth placed teams will play the fifth to eight bracket.
- In the semifinals, the matchups are as follows: A1 vs. B2 and B1 vs. A2
- The winning teams from the semifinals will play for the gold medal. The losing teams compete for the bronze medal.

Ties are broken via the following the criteria, with the first option used first, all the way down to the last option:

1. Head to head results.
2. Goal average (not the goal difference) between the tied teams.
3. Goal average of the tied teams for all teams in its group.

== Squads ==
At the start of tournament, all eight participating countries had 12 players on their rosters. Final squads for the tournament were due on September 14, 2011, a month before the start of the 2011 Pan American Games.

- Argentina
- Brazil
- Canada
- Colombia
- Jamaica
- Mexico
- Puerto Rico
- United States

== Draw ==
The draw for the tournament was held at the Weightlifting Forum, the venue for the Weightlifting at the games in Guadalajara on June 26 and was conducted by FIBA Americas Technical Director, Mr. Anibal García.

The competing are drawn to each group by couples to secure a balance in the competition. The first team selected randomly in the draw goes to group A and the second to Group B. Mexico as host nation got to choose which team from the first pot it played, the United States.

Each team is listed with their world ranking before the draw. NR = Not ranked

Pot 1	Pot 2	Pot 3	Pot 4
United States (1); Brazil (6)	Argentina (13); Canada (12)	Puerto Rico (33); Jamaica (49)	Mexico (27); Colombia (NR)

== Preliminary round ==
All times are local Central Daylight Time (UTC−5)

=== Group A ===
Pos	Team	Pld	W	L	PF	PA	PD	Pts	Qualification
1	Mexico (H)	3	2	1	192	218	−26	5 (Note: Mexico 76–74 Puerto Rico)	Advance to Semifinals
2	Puerto Rico	3	2	1	222	216	+6	5	Advance to Semifinals
3	Argentina	3	1	2	185	186	−1	4 (Note: Argentina 58–55 United States)	
4	United States	3	1	2	212	191	+21	4	

(H) Hosts
Notes:

October 21
13:00

United States	55–58	Argentina
Scoring by quarter: 19–5, 5–15, 13–22, 18–16
Pts: Stewart, 18; Rebs: Stewart, 21; Asts: James, 2		Pts: Gretter, 21; Rebs: Burani, 7 Asts: Gretter, 5

CODE Dome, Guadalajara

October 21
20:00

Mexico	76–74	Puerto Rico
Scoring by quarter: 23–17, 17–13, 21–27, 15–17
Pts: Silva, 22; Rebs: 2 players, 10; Asts: M. Garcia, 5		Pts: Sepulveda, 20; Rebs: 3 players, 5 Asts: 3 players, 3

CODE Dome, Guadalajara

October 22
17:30

United States	70–75	Puerto Rico
Scoring by quarter: 25–14, 8–19, 18–16, 19–26
Pts: Stewart, 14; Rebs: 2 players, 11; Asts: Redmon, 3		Pts: Sepulveda, 21; Rebs: 2 players, 6 Asts: Cortijo, 5

CODE Dome, Guadalajara

October 22
20:00

Argentina	57–58	Mexico
Scoring by quarter: 18–19, 19–10, 7–12, 13–17
Pts: Gretter, 14; Rebs: Burani, 11; Asts: Santana, 3		Pts: Gomez, 20; Rebs: A. Garcia, 13; Asts: Gomez, 4

CODE Dome, Guadalajara

October 23
13:00

Puerto Rico	73–70	Argentina
Scoring by quarter: 16–17, 21–22, 10–13, 26–18
Pts: Escalera, 18; Rebs: Sepulveda, 5 Asts: Cortijo, 4		Pts: Burani, 24; Rebs: 2 players, 7 Asts: Carbrera, 6

CODE Dome, Guadalajara

October 23
20:00

Mexico	58–87	United States
Scoring by quarter: 14–10, 16–17, 15–35, 13–25
Pts: Gomez, 17; Rebs: Gutierrez, 6 Asts: Garcia, 5		Pts: Stewart, 17; Rebs: Redmon, 10; Asts: 3 players, 3

CODE Dome, Guadalajara

=== Group B ===
Pos	Team	Pld	W	L	PF	PA	PD	Pts	Qualification
1	Brazil	3	3	0	280	140	+140	6	Advance to Semifinals
2	Colombia	3	2	1	195	169	+26	5	Advance to Semifinals
3	Canada	3	1	2	206	166	+40	4	
4	Jamaica	3	0	3	89	295	−206	3	

October 21
10:30

Brazil	78–53	Canada
Scoring by quarter: 24–15, 19–10, 14–22, 21–6
Pts: Marques, 16; Rebs: 2 players, 10; Asts: 3 players, 3		Pts: Colley, 14; Rebs: Colley, 7 Asts: 4 players, 2

CODE Dome, Guadalajara

October 21
17:30

Jamaica	26–83	Colombia
Scoring by quarter: 7–20, 5–14, 12–15, 2–34
Pts: Brown, 10; Rebs: Dixon, 8 Asts: 2 players, 2		Pts: Mosquera, 21; Rebs: 2 players, 6 Asts: Olarte, 5

CODE Dome, Guadalajara

October 22
10:30

Brazil	116–34	Jamaica
Scoring by quarter: 25–2, 27–9, 30–11, 34–12
Pts: De Souza, 22; Rebs: De Souza, 15; Asts: De Queiroz, 9		Pts: Jackson, 13; Rebs: Brown, 7 Asts: 2 players, 1

CODE Dome, Guadalajara

October 22
13:00

Canada	57–59	Colombia
Scoring by quarter: 9–9, 23–16, 9–15, 16–19
Pts: Tatham, 17; Rebs: Pinske, 11; Asts: 2 players, 4		Pts: Mosquera, 21; Rebs: Martinez, 7 Asts: 2 players, 3

CODE Dome, Guadalajara

October 23
10:30

Colombia	53–86	Brazil
Scoring by quarter: 13–17, 14–25, 18–22, 8–22
Pts: Leidy Sanchez, 13; Rebs: 2 players, 7 Asts: 2 players, 2		Pts: Marques, 25; Rebs: De Souza, 13; Asts: 2 players, 4

CODE Dome, Guadalajara

October 23
17:30

Canada	96–29	Jamaica
Scoring by quarter: 17–8, 32–6, 20–13, 27–2
Pts: Colley, 16; Rebs: Wolfram, 11; Asts: 6 players, 3		Pts: Dixon, 13; Rebs: Dixon, 7 Asts: 3 players, 1

CODE Dome, Guadalajara

== Elimination stage ==
Semi-finals
24 October – Guadalajara
Brazil	68
Puerto Rico	69
24 October – Guadalajara
Mexico	64
Colombia	58

Final
25 October – Guadalajara
Puerto Rico	85
Mexico	67
Third place
25 October – Guadalajara
Brazil	87
Colombia	48

=== Semifinals ===
October 24
13:00

Brazil	68–69	Puerto Rico
Scoring by quarter: 17–13, 23–22, 12–21, 16–13
Pts: Valente, 16; Rebs: Souza, 15; Asts: Marçal, 4		Pts: Sepulveda, 22; Rebs: Placido, 7 Asts: Cortijo, 4

CODE Dome, Guadalajara

October 24
20:00

Mexico	64–58	Colombia
Scoring by quarter: 16–16, 21–10, 10–18, 17–14
Pts: 2 players, 15; Rebs: 2 players, 8 Asts: Gómez, 6		Pts: Martinez, 15; Rebs: 2 players, 5 Asts: Martinez, 5

CODE Dome, Guadalajara

=== Seventh place match ===
October 24
10:30

United States	87–41	Jamaica
Scoring by quarter: 24–11, 28–6, 19–15, 16–9
Pts: James, 19; Rebs: 2 players, 10; Asts: 2 players, 5		Pts: Jackson, 19; Rebs: Jackson, 10; Asts: Dell, 2

CODE Dome, Guadalajara

=== Fifth place match ===
October 24
17:30

Argentina	50–38	Canada
Scoring by quarter: 17–4, 6–9, 16–13, 11–12
Pts: Reggiardo, 17; Rebs: Burani, 8 Asts: Pavón, 2		Pts: Colley, 11; Rebs: Wolfram, 7 Asts: Colley, 3

CODE Dome, Guadalajara

=== Bronze medal match ===
October 25
17:30

Brazil	87–48	Colombia
Scoring by quarter: 24 – 11, 17 – 19, 28 – 11, 18 – 7
Pts: Marques, 20; Rebs: De Souza, 9 Asts: 4 players, 2		Pts: Sanchez, 12; Rebs: Palacio, 7 Asts: Mosquera, 4

CODE Dome, Guadalajara

=== Gold medal match ===
October 25
20:00

Puerto Rico	85–67	Mexico
Scoring by quarter: 14 – 11, 21 – 19, 25 – 19, 25 – 18
Pts: Cortijo, 29; Rebs: Cortijo, 6 Asts: Cortijo, 10		Pts: Gomez, 33; Rebs: Gomez, 16; Asts: 2 players, 5

CODE Dome, Guadalajara

2011 Pan American Games winners

Puerto Rico
1st title

== Final standings ==
Rank	Team	Record
Gold medal	Puerto Rico	4 — 1
Silver medal	Mexico	3 — 2
Bronze medal	Brazil	4 — 1
4	Colombia	2 — 3
5	Argentina	2 — 2
6	Canada	1 — 3
7	United States	2 — 2
8	Jamaica	0 — 4

== Medalists ==
Event	Gold	Silver	Bronze
Women's tournament	Puerto Rico; Angelica Bermudez; Carla Cortijo; Carla Escalera; Michelle Gonzalez; Yolanda Jones; Angiely Morales; Michelle Pacheco; Mari Placido; Pamela Rosado; Jazmine Sepulveda; Cynthia Valentin; Esmary Vargas	Mexico; Marie Bibbs; Alexis Castro; Azucena Loudres; Abril Garcia; Monica Garcia; Sofia Garica; Erika Gomez; Fernanda Guitierrez; Laura Nuñez; Maylene Ornelas; Sonia Ortega; Brisa Silva	Brazil; Tassia Carcavalli; Damiris Dantas; Izabela De Andrade; Barbara De Queiroz; Carina De Souza; Erika De Souza; Clarissa Dos Santos; Gilmara Justino; Palmira Marcal; Iziane Marques; Jaqueline Silvestre; Silvia Valente
