= Basketball at the 2015 Pan American Games =

- Basketball pictogram for the games
- Venue: Ryerson Athletic Centre
- Dates: July 16–25
- No. of events: 2 (1 men, 1 women)
- Competitors: 191 from 9 nations

Basketball competitions at the 2015 Pan American Games in Toronto were held from July 16 to 25 at the Ryerson Athletic Centre. A total of eight men's and women's teams competed in each tournament respectively.

== Competition schedule ==
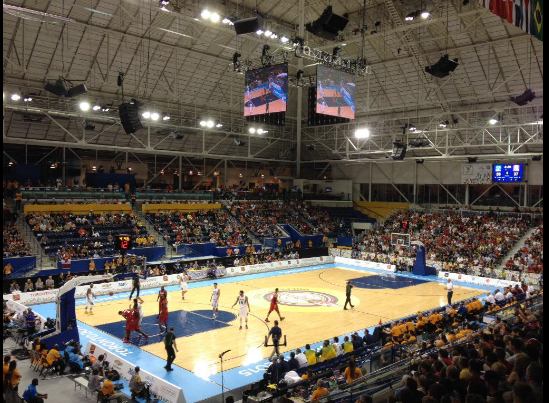
The Ryerson Athletic Centre, was the venue for the basketball competitions

The following is the competition schedule for the basketball competitions:

P	Preliminaries	½	Semifinals	B	3rd place play-off	F	Final

Event↓/Date →	Thu 16	Fri 17	Sat 18	Sun 19	Mon 20		Tue 21	Wed 22	Thu 23	Fri 24	Sat 25	
Men							P	P	P	½	B	F
Women	P	P	P	½	B	F						

== Medal table ==
* Host nation (Canada)

Rank	Nation	Gold	Silver	Bronze	Total
1	Canada*	1	1	0	2
2	Brazil	1	0	0	1
3	United States	0	1	1	2
4	Cuba	0	0	1	1
Totals (4 entries)		2	2	2	6

== Medalists ==
Event	Gold	Silver	Bronze
Men's tournament	Brazil; Ricardo Fischer; Rafael Luz; Augusto César Lima; Larry Taylor; Vítor Benite; Carlos Olivinha; Rafael Hettsheimeir; Rafael Mineiro; João Paulo Batista; Léonardo Meindl; Marcus Vinicius Toledo	Canada; Anthony Bennett; Sim Bhullar; Dillon Brooks; Junior Cadougan; Aaron Doornekamp; Melvin Ejim; Carl English; Brady Heslip; Daniel Mullings; Jamal Murray; Andrew Nicholson; Kyle Wiltjer	United States; Ron Baker; Malcolm Brogdon; Bobby Brown; Ryan Hollins; Keith Langford; Shawn Long; Taurean Prince; Anthony Randolph; Kaleb Tarczewski; Romelo Trimble; Denzel Valentine; Damien Wilkins
Women's tournament	Canada; Natalie Achonwa; Miranda Ayim; Nirra Fields; Kim Gaucher; Miah-Marie Langlois; Lizanne Murphy; Kia Nurse; Katherine Plouffe; Michelle Plouffe; Nayo Raincock-Ekunwe; Tamara Tatham; Shona Thorburn	United States; Sophie Brunner; Alaina Coates; Caroline Coyer; Linnae Harper; Moriah Jefferson; Stephanie Mavunga; Tiffany Mitchell; Kelsey Plum; Taya Reimer; Breanna Stewart; Shatori Walker-Kimbrough; Courtney Williams	Cuba; Fransy Ochoa; Ineidis Casanova; Anisleidy Galindo; Oyanaisy Gelis; Arlenys Romero; Yamara Amargo; Arlety Povea; Marlene Cepeda; Clenia Noblet; Zuleira Aties; Leidys Oquendo; Suchitel Avila

== Qualification ==
A total of eight men's teams and eight women's team will qualify to compete at the games. The top three teams at the South American and Central American and Caribbean Championships will qualify for each respective tournament. The host nation (Canada) along with the United States automatically qualifies teams in both events. Each nation may enter one team in each tournament (12 athletes per team) for a maximum total of 24 athletes.

=== Men ===
Event	Date	Location	Vacancies	Qualified
Host Nation	—N/a	—N/a	1	Canada
Qualified automatically	—N/a	—N/a	1	United States
2014 South American Basketball Championship	July 23–28	(Venezuela) Isla Margarita	3	Venezuela; Argentina; Brazil
2014 Centrobasket	August 1–7	(Mexico) Tepic	3	Mexico; Puerto Rico; Dominican Republic
Total			8	

=== Women ===
Event	Date	Location	Vacancies	Qualified
Host Nation	—N/a	—N/a	1	Canada
Qualified automatically	—N/a	—N/a	1	United States
2014 Centrobasket Women	July 22–26	(Mexico) Monterrey	3	Cuba; Puerto Rico; Dominican Republic
2014 South American Basketball Championship for Women	August 14–18	(Ecuador) Ambato	3	Brazil; Argentina; Venezuela
Total			8	

== Participating nations ==
A total of nine countries have qualified basketball teams.

- Argentina (24 athletes)
- Brazil (23)
- Canada (24)
- Cuba (12)
- Dominican Republic (24)
- Mexico (12)
- Puerto Rico (24)
- United States (24)
- Venezuela (24)

== See also ==
- Basketball at the 2016 Summer Olympics
