= Coronado High School (Lubbock, Texas) =

Public school in Texas, U.S.

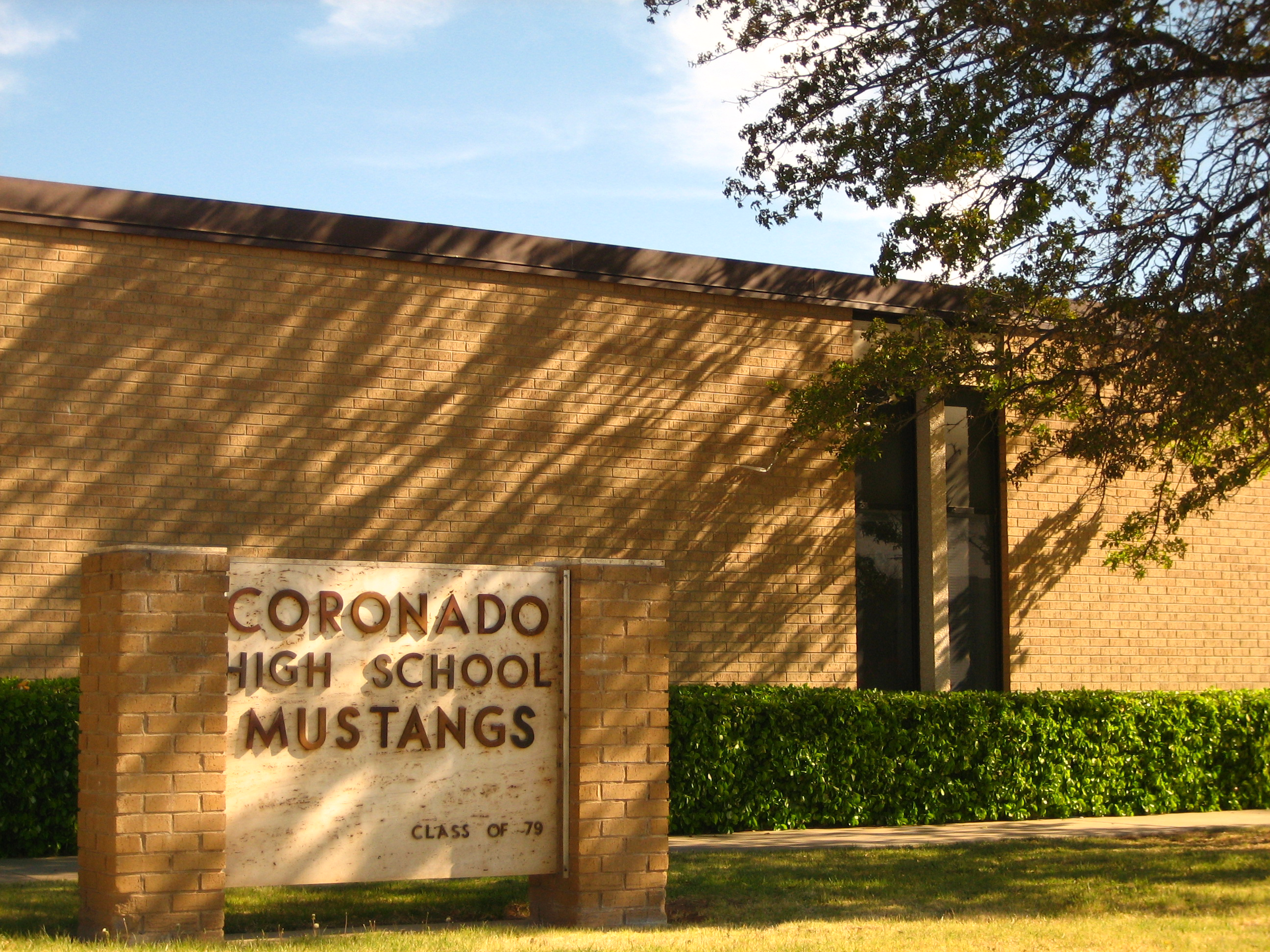
- Coronado High School at the intersection of Vicksburg Avenue and 34th Street in Lubbock

Location
- 4910 29th Dr. Lubbock, Texas 79410; 33.5646°N 101.91439°W

Information
- Type: Public
- Motto: We Are Coronado
- Established: 1965
- Principal: Chris Huber
- Staff: 122.94 (FTE)
- Enrollment: 1,904 (2023-2024)
- Student to teacher ratio: 15.49
- Colors: Scarlet and gold
- Mascot: Mustangs
- Motto: College Ready, Career Ready and Life Ready
- Website: www.lubbockisd.org/o/chs

Coronado High School is the second newest high school in the Lubbock Independent School District. Coronado, named for the Spanish conquistador and explorer Francisco Vázquez de Coronado, opened its doors in 1965 as the fourth high school in Lubbock, joining Lubbock High, Monterey High, and Dunbar High. Estacado was built two years after Coronado opened, in 1967. The school's mascot is the Mustang, and its colors are Scarlet and Old Gold. Like the other high schools in Lubbock ISD, Coronado discontinued its block scheduling in the 2012–13 academic calendar and went to every class every day. The school serves the southwestern part of Lubbock, Texas. The Coronado male sports teams are nicknamed the "Mustangs", with the female teams nicknamed the "Lady Mustangs".

== Notable alumni ==
- Jarrett Culver, NBA basketball player
- Trey Culver, two-time NCAA high jump champion
- Justin Duchscherer, MLB relief pitcher with the Oakland Athletics
- Sonny Dykes, head football coach of Texas Christian University
- Landon Johnson, NFL linebacker with the Carolina Panthers
- Mark Lanier, attorney and trial lawyer
- Matt Martin, baseball coach with the Detroit Tigers
- Willie McCool, one of the astronauts killed when the Columbia disintegrated over Texas
- Richie McDonald, lead singer of the band Lonestar
- Pete Orta, Christian rock guitarist and former member of the band Petra
- Scott Pelley, former anchor of the CBS Evening News
- Josh Rosenthal (singer/songwriter), singer/songwriter - 2001 graduate
- Mike Smith, coach for the Green Bay Packers
- Erika Valek, college basketball award winner
- Josh Wilson (musician), Contemporary Christian artist/singer/songwriter - 2002 graduate
