= Alisha Tatham =

Canadian basketball player (born 1986)

Alisha Tatham (born October 14, 1986 in East York) is a Canadian professional basketball player. She plays for Canada women's national basketball team. She has competed in the 2012 Summer Olympics. Her sister Tamara also competed for Canada at the Games. She is 1.80 m (5 ft 11 in) tall.

She also competed for Canada at the 2011 Pan American Games.

== Massachusetts statistics ==
Ratios
Year	Team	GP	FG%	3P%	FT%	RBG	APG	BPG	SPG	PPG
2004-05	Massachusetts	28	29.1%	18.2%	58.3%	1.04	0.46	0.11	0.32	1.46
2005-06	Massachusetts	28	38.2%	21.4%	63.3%	2.18	1.21	0.11	0.61	3.89
2006-07	Massachusetts	30	44.9%	22.6%	65.6%	3.03	1.83	-	0.80	6.37
2007-08	Massachusetts	30	44.4%	18.8%	57.6%	3.33	1.50	0.10	0.73	6.10
Career		116	41.4%	20.9%	61.6%	2.42	1.27	0.08	0.62	4.52

Totals
Year	Team	GP	FG	FGA	3P	3PA	FT	FTA	REB	A	BK	ST	PTS
2004-05	Massachusetts	28	16	55	2	11	7	12	29	13	3	9	41
2005-06	Massachusetts	28	42	110	6	28	19	30	61	34	3	17	109
2006-07	Massachusetts	30	71	158	7	31	42	64	91	55	0	24	191
2007-08	Massachusetts	30	71	160	3	16	38	66	100	45	3	22	183
Career		116	200	483	18	86	106	172	281	147	9	72	524
