= 2010 South American Basketball Championship for Women =

32nd South American Women's Basketball Championship

Tournament details
- Host country: Chile
- Dates: 10 – August 14
- Teams: 8
- Venue: 1 (in 1 host city)

Final positions
- Champions: Brazil (23rd title)

Tournament statistics
- MVP: (Paraguay) Paola Ferrari

Official website
- South American Women's Basketball Championship 2010

The 2010 South American Basketball Championship for Women was the 32nd edition of the FIBA South America Championship for Women. Seven teams competed in the competition, held in Santiago, Chile, from 10 to August 14. Brazil was the defending champion and retained the title.

== Preliminary round ==
Qualified for the semifinals
Team competed in Classification Round

=== Group A ===
Team	Pts	Pld	W	L	PF	PA	PD
Argentina	4	2	2	0	179	144	+35
Paraguay	3	2	1	1	168	185	–17
Chile	2	2	0	2	163	181	–18

August 10
19:30

Report

Argentina	97–69	Paraguay
Scoring by quarter: 30–11, 16–19, 28–17, 23–22
Pts: Cava, Fernández 20; Rebs: Fernández 8 Asts: González, Chesta, Pavón 3		Pts: Ferrari 33; Rebs: Ferrari 8 Asts: Peña, Aponte 2

August 11
19:30

Report

Chile	88–99	Paraguay
Scoring by quarter: 16–30, 14–15, 28–25, 30–29
Pts: Aragonese 23; Rebs: Gómez 19; Asts: Novión 6		Pts: Ferrari 48; Rebs: Aponte 6 Asts: Ferrari 9

August 12
19:30

Report

Chile	75–82	Argentina
Scoring by quarter: 15–20, 21–21, 18–28, 21–13
Pts: Gómez 18; Rebs: Gómez 6 Asts: Morrison 3		Pts: Sánchez 28; Rebs: Sánchez 8 Asts: Gatti 5

=== Group B ===
Team	Pts	Pld	W	L	PF	PA	PD
Brazil	6	3	3	0	321	133	+188
Colombia	5	3	2	1	200	216	–16
Venezuela	4	3	1	2	170	244	–74
Uruguay	3	3	0	3	173	271	–98

August 10
15:30

Report

Venezuela	61–68	Colombia
Scoring by quarter: 10–21, 12–10, 22–17, 17–20
Pts: Silva 19; Rebs: Villarroel 9 Asts: Pérez 3		Pts: Mosquera 28; Rebs: Mosquera, Martínez 6 Asts: Valek 7

August 10
17:30

Report

Brazil	120–43	Uruguay
Scoring by quarter: 31–8, 26–14, 35–10, 28–11
Pts: Amaral 18; Rebs: Santos 8 Asts: K. Rocha 4		Pts: Pereyra 9 Rebs: Pereyra, Acosta, Dagnino, Somma 2 Asts: Tovagliari, Acosta 1

August 11
15:30

Report

Uruguay	69–72	Venezuela
Scoring by quarter: 19–15, 13–25, 18–22, 19–10
Pts: Pereyra 19; Rebs: Somma 10; Asts: Guadalupe 2		Pts: Corrales 21; Rebs: Corrales, C. Blanco 9 Asts: Silva 3

August 11
17:30

Report

Brazil	94–53	Colombia
Scoring by quarter: 28–10, 22–7, 24–17, 20–19
Pts: Beling 13; Rebs: S. Rocha, Oliveira 7 Asts: Pinto 6		Pts: Mosquera 16; Rebs: Robledo 6 Asts: Valek 5

August 12
15:30

Report

Colombia	79–61	Uruguay
Scoring by quarter: 28–20, 22–15, 13–14, 16–12
Pts: Arias 26; Rebs: Mosquera 9 Asts: Valek 8		Pts: Tovagliari 16; Rebs: Dibarboure, Somma 5 Asts: Guadalupe, Dagnino 2

August 12
17:30

Report

Brazil	107–37	Venezuela
Scoring by quarter: 20–11, 30–7, 28–12, 29–7
Pts: Colhado 16; Rebs: S. Rocha 8 Asts: Luz 7		Pts: C. Blanco 8 Rebs: Villarroel 5 Asts: Silva 4

== Knockout round ==
=== 5th–7th playoffs ===
Semi-finals
August 13 – Santiago
Chile	96
Uruguay	63
Venezuela
bye

Fifth place
August 14 – Santiago
Chile	86
Venezuela	71

==== 5th–7th semifinals ====
August 13
15:30

Report

Chile	96–63	Uruguay
Scoring by quarter: 30–13, 16–16, 18–17, 32–17
Pts: Gómez 23; Rebs: Morrison, Gómez 13; Asts: Novión 6		Pts: Guadalupe 17; Rebs: Guadalupe 5 Asts: Guarnaschelli 2

==== 5th place playoff ====
August 14
15:30

Report

Chile	86–71	Venezuela
Scoring by quarter: 30–18, 12–12, 20–17, 24–24
Pts: Morrison 20; Rebs: Morrison 16; Asts: Franco, Novión, Morrison, Gómez 2		Pts: Villarroel 25; Rebs: Blanco 11; Asts: Silva 3

=== Championship ===
Semi-finals
August 13 – Santiago
Argentina	83
Colombia	74
August 13 – Santiago
Brazil	114
Paraguay	61

Final
August 14 – Santiago
Argentina	68
Brazil	94
Third place
August 14 – Santiago
Colombia	85
Paraguay	70

==== Semifinals ====
August 13
17:30

Report

Argentina	83–74	Colombia
Scoring by quarter: 16–24, 18–14, 31–17, 18–19
Pts: Sánchez 20; Rebs: Pavón 9 Asts: Paoletta 4		Pts: Arias 23; Rebs: Arias 11; Asts: Valek 5

August 13
19:30

Report

Brazil	114–61	Paraguay
Scoring by quarter: 32–14, 28–21, 29–14, 25–12
Pts: Colhado 23; Rebs: Colhado 9 Asts: Pinto, K. Rocha, S. Rocha 4		Pts: Ferrari 23; Rebs: Ferrari, Caraves 4 Asts: Aponte

==== Bronze medal game ====
August 14
17:30

Report

Colombia	85–70	Paraguay
Scoring by quarter: 17–20, 29–17, 25–11, 14–22
Pts: Arias 34; Rebs: Arias 14; Asts: Valek 7		Pts: Ferrari 30; Rebs: Huttemann, Insfran 6 Asts: Ferrari 7

==== Final ====
August 14
19:30

Report

Argentina	68–94	Brazil
Scoring by quarter: 25–17, 17–23, 13–23, 13–31
Pts: Reggiardo 19; Rebs: Cava 5 Asts: González, Reggiardo 2		Pts: S. Rocha 14; Rebs: Amaral 6 Asts: Pinto, K. Rocha, Colhado 2

== Final standings ==
Rank	Team	Record
1st place, gold medalist(s)	Brazil	5–0
2nd place, silver medalist(s)	Argentina	3–1
3rd place, bronze medalist(s)	Colombia	3–2
4th	Paraguay	1–3
5th	Chile	2–2
6th	Venezuela	1–3
7th	Uruguay	0–4
