= Matt Martin (baseball) =

American baseball coach

Los Angeles Angels – No. 80
- Coach
- Born: July 18, 1969 (age 57); Lubbock, Texas, U.S.
- Stats at Baseball Reference

Matthew V. Martin (born July 18, 1969) is an American baseball coach for the Los Angeles Angels of Major League Baseball.

== Early life ==
Martin is a native of Lubbock, Texas. He graduated from Coronado High School.

== Career ==
Martin was drafted by the Cincinnati Reds in the 36th round of the 1991 Major League Baseball Draft. He played for the Billings Mustangs of the Rookie Pioneer League in 1991 (batting .178) and 1992 (batting .243). In 1992 he played for the Charleston Wheelers (batting .223) of the A South Atlantic League, and in 1993 he played for the Winston-Salem Spirits (batting .143 in 7 at bats) of the A+ Carolina League. He played all infield positions and pitched.

Martin served as a coach and manager for the Detroit Tigers, Los Angeles Dodgers and Baltimore Orioles. In 1996 he managed Billings to a 23-49 (.319) record, in 2006 he managed the GCL Yankees of the Rookie Gulf Coast League to a 31-20 (.608) record, and in 2012 he managed the AZL Dodgers of the Rookie Arizona League to a 34-21 (.618) record.

He coached the Israeli national baseball team during the qualifying round of the 2013 World Baseball Classic. Martin was hired in 2014 by Brad Ausmus as the Detroit Tigers' first-ever defensive coordinator. When Ausmus was hired to be the Los Angeles Angels new manager for the 2019 season, Martin came along with him to become the team's Assistant Coach/Instant Replay Coordinator.

== Personal life ==
Martin has a grown daughter, Jade.
