= Shona Thorburn =

Canadian basketball player (born 1982)

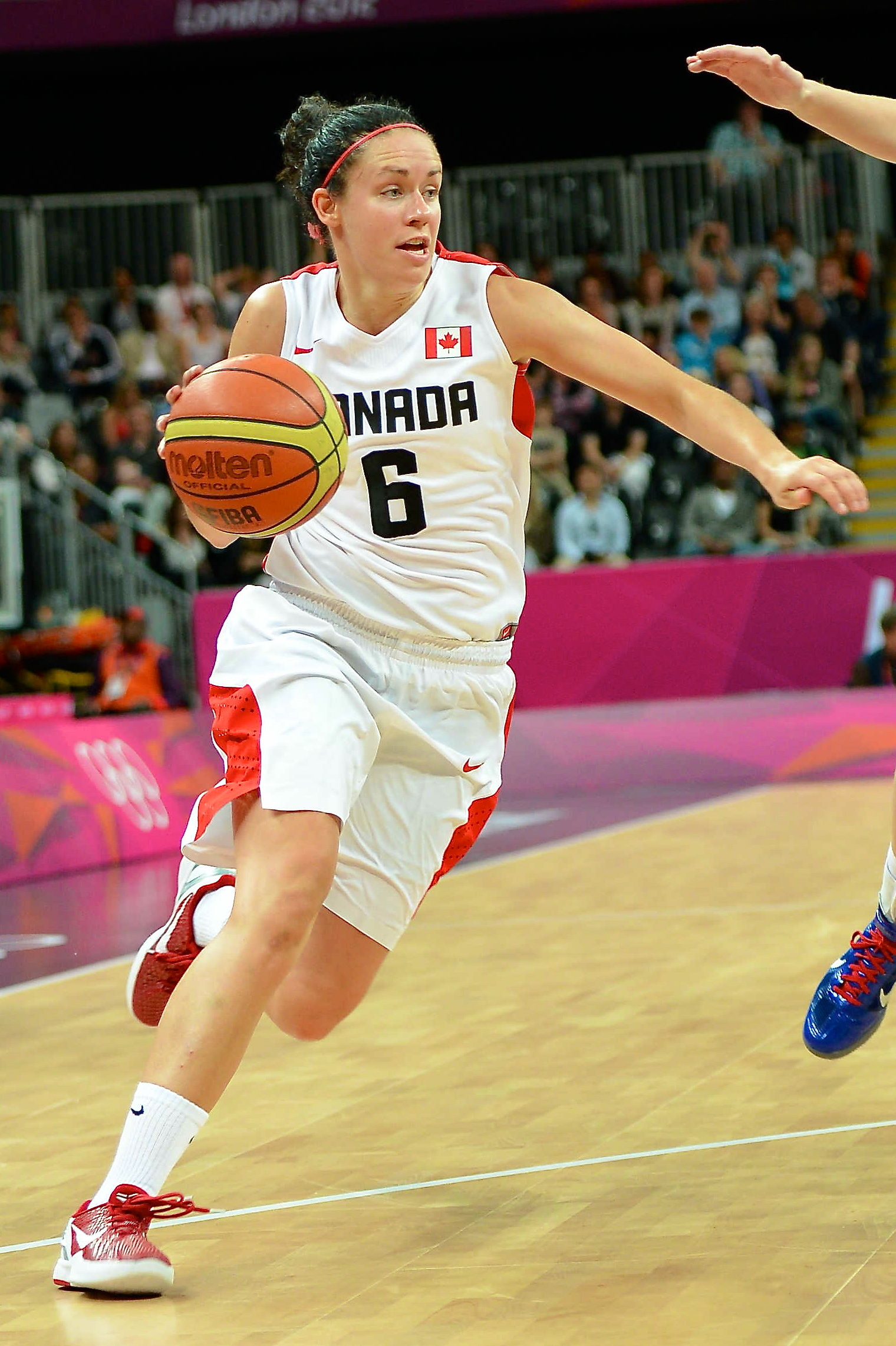

Personal information
- Born: August 7, 1982 (age 44) Oxford, England
- Listed height: 5 ft 9 in (1.75 m)
- Listed weight: 149 lb (68 kg)

Career information
- High school: Westdale Secondary School (Hamilton, Ontario)
- College: Utah (2002–2006)
- WNBA draft: 2006: 1st round, 7th overall pick
- Drafted by: Minnesota Lynx
- Playing career: 2006–present
- Position: Point guard

Career history
- 2006: Minnesota Lynx
- 2007: Seattle Storm

Career highlights
- MWC co-Player of the Year (2005)
- Stats at Basketball Reference
Medals
Women's basketball
Representing Canada
FIBA Americas Women's Championship
Silver medal – second place	2013 Mexico
Pan American Games
Gold medal – first place	2015 Toronto	Team

Shona Thorburn (born August 7, 1982) is a Canadian professional basketball player, formerly a point guard for the Seattle Storm of the WNBA.

Thorburn is a graduate of Westdale Secondary School in Hamilton, Ontario. She later attended college at the University of Utah and graduated in 2006. Following her collegiate career, she was selected 7th overall in the 2006 WNBA draft by the Minnesota Lynx.

Most of Thorburn's rookie season was spent on the bench. She never got into the Lynx rotation and averaged just 0.8 points, 0.9 assists and 6.6 minutes in 21 games. On May 14, 2007, she was released by the Lynx.

Thorburn signed a 7-day contract with the Seattle Storm in July 2007, but was released when the term expired.

== FIBA ==
She was invited to join the national team, to play in the 2013 FIBA Americas Championship for Women, held in Xalapa, Mexico from 21 to 28 September 2013. She averaged 3.5 points and 3.3 rebounds per game, and helped the Canadian National team to a second place, silver medal finish. Canada faced Cuba in a preliminary round and won 53–40, but in the championship game, Cuba prevailed 79–71.

== Pam Am games 2015 ==
Thorburn was a member of the Canada women's national basketball team which participated in basketball at the 2015 Pan American Games held in Toronto, Ontario, Canada July 10 to 26, 2015. Canada opened the preliminary rounds with an easy 101–38 win over Venezuela. The following day they beat Argentina 73–58. The final preliminary game was against Cuba; both teams were 2–0, so the winner would win the group. The game went down to the wire with Canada eking out a 71–68 win. Canada faced Brazil in the semifinal.

Everything seemed to go right in the semifinal game. Canada opened the game with an 11–2 run on seven consecutive points by Miranda Ayim. Langlois contributed five assists. In the third quarter Canada strongly out rebounded Brazil and hit 69% of their field goals to score 33 points in the quarter. Lizanne Murphy and Nirra Fields hit three-pointers to help extend the lead to 68–39 at the end of three quarters. Canada continued to dominate in the fourth quarter with three-pointers by Kia Nurse and Kim Gaucher. Canada went on to win the game 91–63 to earn a spot in the gold-medal game against the USA.

The gold-medal game matched up the host team Canada against USA, in a sold-out arena dominated by fans in red and white and waving the Canadian flag. The Canadian team, arm in arm, sang Oh Canada as the respective national anthems were played.

After trading baskets early the US edged out to a double-digit lead in the second quarter. However the Canadians, spurred on by the home crowd cheering, fought back and tied up the game at halftime. In the third quarter, it was Canada's time to shine as they outscore the US 26–15. The lead reached as many as 18 points. The USA fought back, but not all the way and Canada won the game and the gold-medal 81–73. It was Canada's first gold medal in basketball in the Pan Am games. Nurse was the star for Canada with 33 points, hitting 11 of her 12 free-throw attempts in 10 of her 17 field-goal attempts including two of three three-pointers.

== Honours ==
In 2012 Thorburn was awarded the Queen Elizabeth II Diamond Jubilee Medal.

== WNBA career statistics ==
Legend
GP	Games played	GS	Games started	MPG	Minutes per game	RPG	Rebounds per game
APG	Assists per game	SPG	Steals per game	BPG	Blocks per game	PPG	Points per game
TO	Turnovers per game	FG%	Field-goal percentage	3P%	3-point field-goal percentage	FT%	Free-throw percentage
**Bold**	Career best	°	League leader

=== Regular season ===
Year	Team	GP	GS	MPG	FG%	3P%	FT%	RPG	APG	SPG	BPG	TO	PPG
2006	Minnesota	**22**	0	**6.5**	.185	**.125**	**.625**	**0.8**	**0.9**	**0.2**	**0.1**	0.6	0.7
2007	Seattle	2	0	4.0	**.500**	.000	.000	0.5	0.0	0.0	0.0	1.0	**1.0**
Career	2 years, 2 teams	24	0	6.3	.207	.125	.625	0.8	0.8	0.2	0.1	0.7	0.8

== University of Utah statistics ==
Legend
GP	Games played	GS	Games started	MPG	Minutes per game
FG%	Field goal percentage	3P%	3-point field goal percentage	FT%	Free throw percentage
RPG	Rebounds per game	APG	Assists per game	SPG	Steals per game
BPG	Blocks per game	PPG	Points per game	**Bold**	Career high

Year	School	GP	GS	MPG	FG%	3P%	FT%	RPG	APG	SPG	BPG	PPG
2001-02	Utah	Redshirt - did not play										
2002-03	Utah	31	31	36.5	0.375	0.328	0.814	5.8	3.3	1.5	0.3	14.6
2003-04	Utah	31	31	37.4	0.378	0.331	0.638	5.4	4.0	1.0	**0.4**	12.0
2004-5	Utah	**34**	**34**	**38.5**	**0.406**	**0.353**	0.654	6.2	6.5	**2.0**	0.3	**14.9**
2005-06	Utah	**34**	**34**	37.0	0.361	0.274	**0.739**	**6.4**	**7.1**	1.6	0.1	11.9
Total	Utah	130	130	37.4	0.381	0.324	0.708	6.0	5.3	1.6	0.3	13.3
