= Chelsea Aubry =

Canadian basketball player

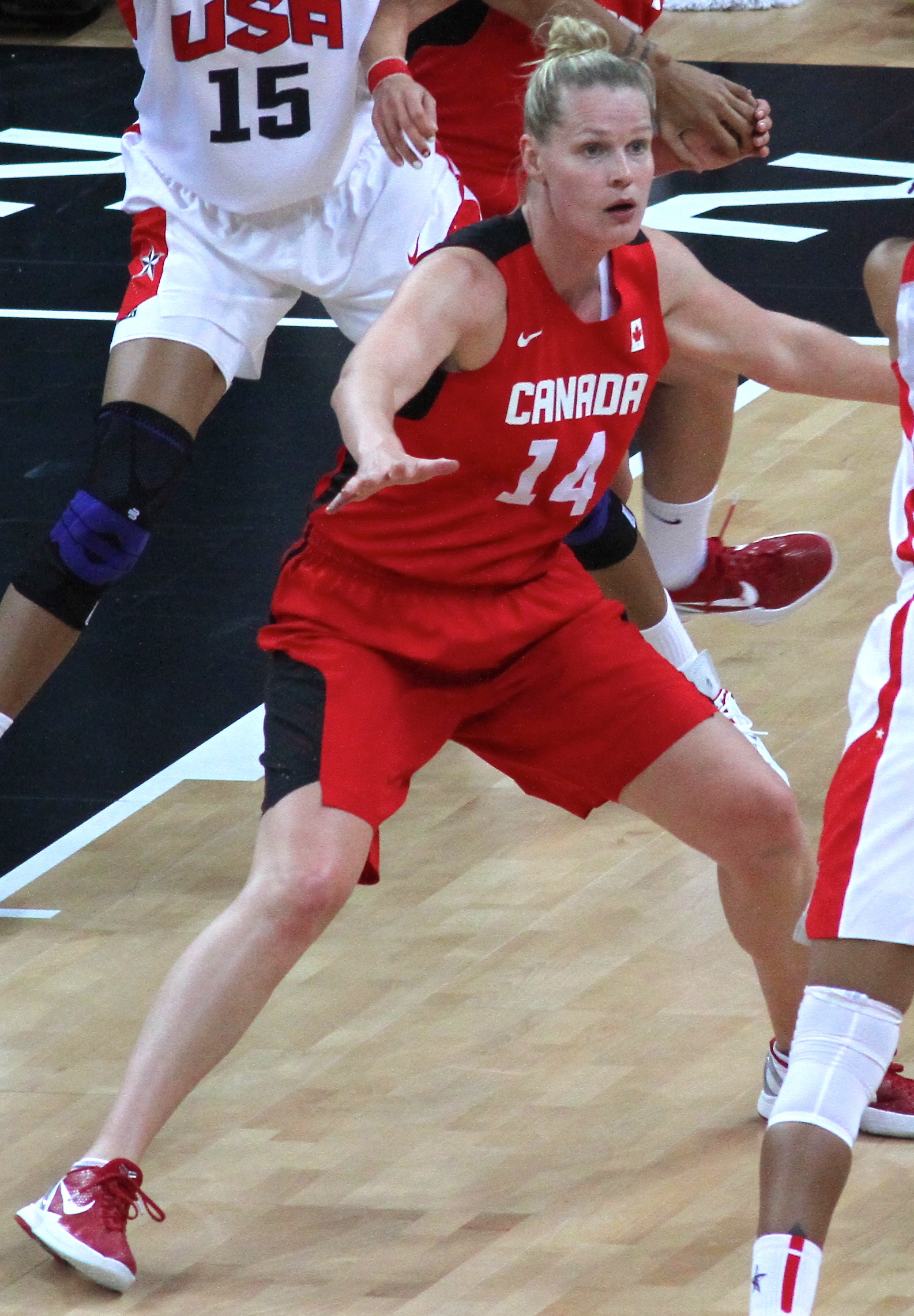

Personal information
- Born: June 27, 1984 (age 42) Kitchener, Ontario
- Listed height: 6 ft 2 in (1.88 m)

Chelsea Aubry (born June 27, 1984) is a Canadian professional basketball player from Kitchener, Ontario. She plays for the Canadian women's national basketball team. She has competed in the 2012 Summer Olympics. She is 1.88 m (6 ft 2 in) tall. She has played for Bendigo Spirit.
