= Tássia Carcavalli =

Brazilian basketball player (born 1992)

Medal record

Women's basketball

Representing Brazil

Pan American Games
Bronze medal – third place	2011 Guadalajara	Team

FIBA AmeriCup
Bronze medal – third place	2021 San Juan	

Tássia Carcavalli (born 31 May 1992) is a Brazilian female basketball player. At the 2012 Summer Olympics, she competed for the Brazil women's national basketball team in the women's event. She is 5 ft 9 inches tall.

She was a member of the team which competed for Brazil at the 2011 Pan American Games, winning a bronze medal.

She was also a member of the Brazil women's national basketball team which competed at the 2015 Pan American Games.
