= Coliseo Álvaro Sánchez Silva =

Álvaro Sánchez Silva Coliseum
- Interactive map of Álvaro Sánchez Silva Coliseum
- Location: Neiva, Huila
- Capacity: 8000
- Type: Indoor Sporting Arena

Construction
- Opened: 1986
- Renovated: 2010

The Coliseo Álvaro Sánchez Silva, is an indoor sporting arena located in Neiva, Huila, Colombia. It is the most important sporting facility in Huila after the Estadio Guillermo Plazas Alcid. It has been recognized as having one of the best basketball courts in Colombia. It is used mainly for basketball events. The capacity of the arena is 8000 people.

It has hosted several national and international events such as the South American Basketball Championship 2010. It is also the venue for the "Elección y Coronacion Reina Nacional del Bambuco" during the Festival Folclórico y Reinado Nacional del Bambuco.
