= Tamara Tatham =

Canadian basketball player and coach (born 1985)

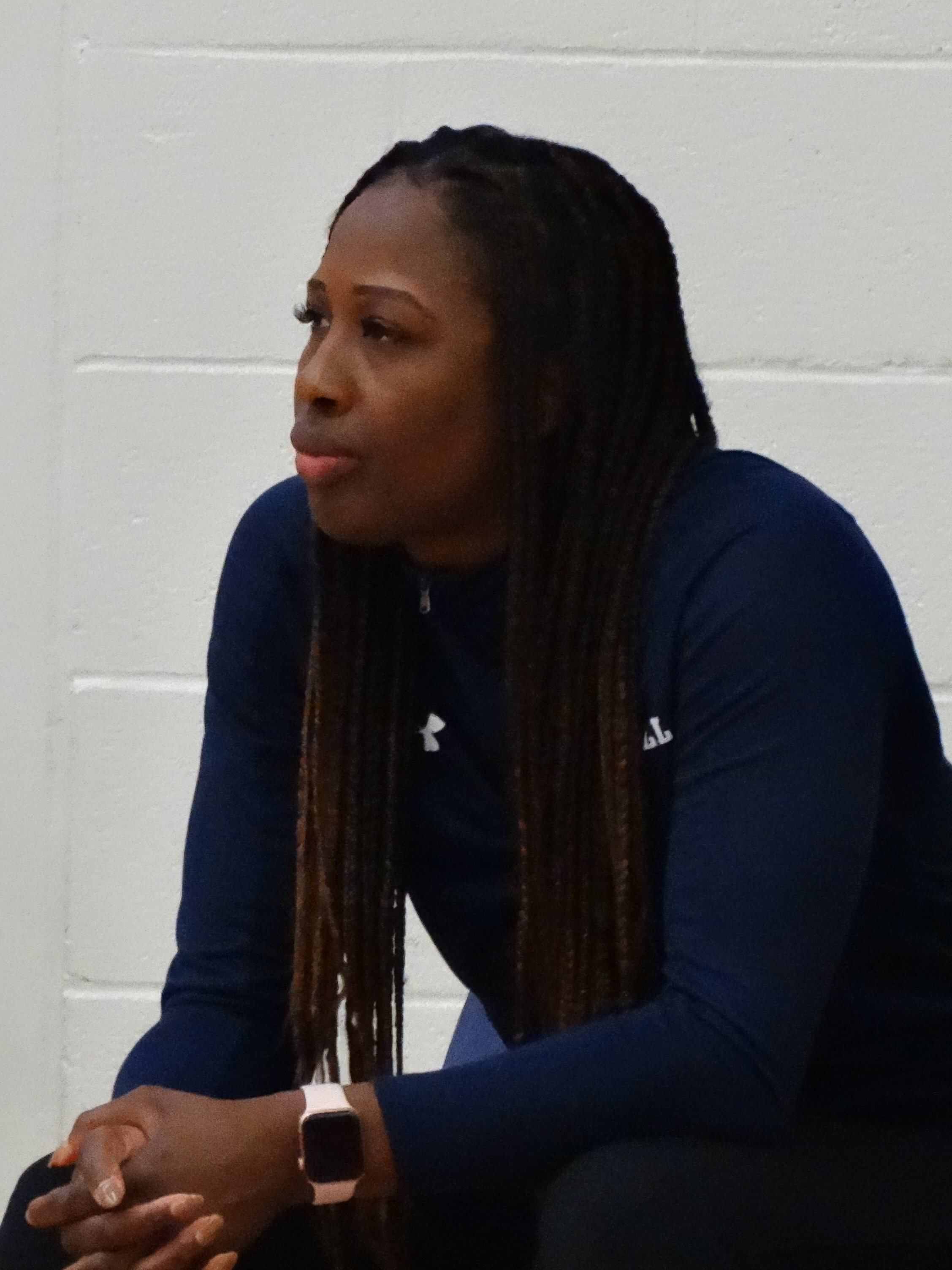
- Tatham with the Varsity Blues in 2023

Personal information
- Born: August 19, 1985 (age 41) Toronto, Ontario, Canada
- Listed height: 6 ft 1 in (1.85 m)

Career information
- High school: Chinguacousy (Brampton, Ontario)
- College: UMass (2003–2007)
- WNBA draft: 2007: undrafted
- Playing career: 2007–2018
- Position: Head coach
- Coaching career: 2017–present

Career history

Coaching
- 2017–2020: Toronto Varsity Blues (Assistant)
- 2020–2024: Toronto Varsity Blues
Medals
Women's basketball
Representing Canada
FIBA Americas Women's Championship
Gold medal – first place	2015 Edmonton
Silver medal – second place	2013 Mexico
Pan American Games
Gold medal – first place	2015 Toronto	Team

Tamara Tatham (born August 19, 1985) is a Canadian former professional basketball player and coach. She was a member of the Canada women's national basketball team and competed in the 2012 and 2016 Summer Olympics. Tatham was the head coach of the Toronto Varsity Blues women's basketball team from 2020-2024.

== Playing career ==
Tatham played college basketball at the University of Massachusetts from 2003 to 2007, appearing in a total of 115 games for the Minutewomen, averaging 10.3 points, 6.6 boards, 2.0 assists and 1.7 steals a contest.

She kicked off her professional career in 2007, signing with Catz Lappeenranta in Finland, where she spent the 2007-08 campaign. Tatham enjoyed great success in her five years in Germany, representing the SV Halle Lions (2008–09, 2010 - 2013) and TSV Wasserburg (2009–10), hauling in 2012 Eurobasket.com All-German DBBL Player of the Year honours as well as Eurobasket.com All-German DBBL Defensive Player of the Year distinction in 2009 and 2012. She also made the Eurobasket.com All-German DBBL 1st Team in 2009, 2012 and 2013.

After leaving Germany, Tatham took her game to Slovakia, signing with Extraliga outfit Piestanske Cajky in 2013. In her second season with the club (2014–15), she earned Eurobasket.com All-Slovakian Extraliga Player of the Year honours.

Tatham played for Townsville Fire of the Australian WNBL in 2015, followed by a one-year stint in Russia, representing Dynamo Novosibirsk in 2016-17. She signed with USO Mondeville of the French league LFB for the 2017-18 campaign.

== National team ==
Tatham played for Canada's women's national team at the 2012 and 2016 Olympic Games as well as at the 2010 and 2014 World Championships. She also represented her country at the Panamerican Games, reaching the semis in 2007 and winning gold in 2015. Tatham was a member of the Canadian squad that captured a bronze medal at the 2011 FIBA Americas, a silver medal at the 2013 FIBA Americas and a gold medal at the 2015 FIBA Americas.

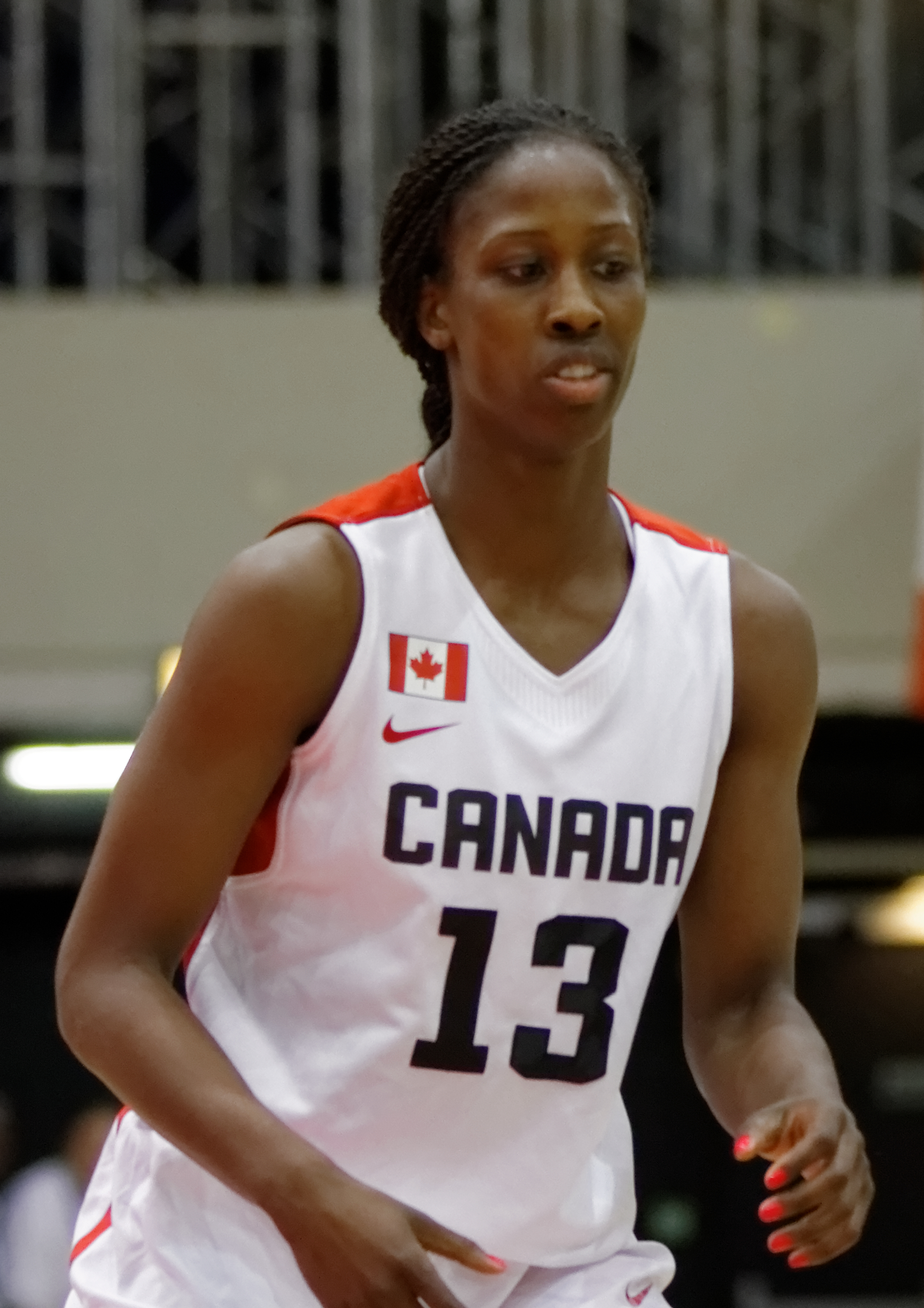
Tatham in 2013

=== Pan Am games 2015 ===
Tatham was a member of the Canada women's national basketball team which participated in basketball at the 2015 Pan American Games held in Toronto, Ontario, Canada July 10 to 26, 2015. Canada opened the preliminary rounds with an easy 101–38 win over Venezuela. The following day they beat Argentina 73–58. The final preliminary game was against Cuba; both teams were 2–0, so the winner would win the group. The game went down to the wire with Canada eking out a 71–68 win. Canada would face Brazil in the semifinal.

Everything seemed to go right in the semifinal game. Canada opened the game with an 11–2 run on seven consecutive points by Miranda Ayim. Miah-Marie Langlois contributed five assists. In the third quarter Canada strongly out rebounded Brazil and hit 69% of their field goals to score 33 points in the quarter. Lizanne Murphy and Nirra Fields hit three-pointers to help extend the lead to 68–39 at the end of three quarters. Canada continued to dominate in the fourth quarter with three-pointers by Kia Nurse and Kim Gaucher. Canada went on to win the game 91–63 to earn a spot in the gold-medal game against the USA.

The gold-medal game matched up the host team Canada against USA, in a sold out arena dominated by fans in red and white and waving the Canadian flag. The Canadian team, arm in arm, sang Oh Canada as the respective national anthems were played.

After trading baskets early the US edged out to a double-digit lead in the second quarter. However the Canadians, spurred on by the home crowd cheering, fought back and tied up the game at halftime. In the third quarter, it was Canada's time to shine as they outscore the US 26–15. The lead would reach as high as 18 points. The USA would fight back, but not all the way and Canada won the game and the gold-medal 81–73. It was Canada's first gold-medal in basketball in the Pan Am games. Nurse was the star for Canada with 33 points, hitting 11 of her 12 free-throw attempts in 10 of her 17 field-goal attempts including two of three three-pointers. Tatham contributed ten points, including six for six from the free throw line.

== University of Massachusetts statistics ==
Ratios
Year	Team	GP	FG%	3P%	FT%	RBG	APG	BPG	SPG	PPG
2003-04	Massachusetts	28	41.5%	-	56.0%	4.89	1.36	0.68	1.46	9.25
2004-05	Massachusetts	29	51.0%	-	57.8%	5.38	1.35	0.55	1.72	9.14
2005-06	Massachusetts	28	45.7%	-	72.0%	6.89	1.96	0.64	1.43	9.96
2006-07	Massachusetts	30	49.3%	-	66.4%	8.97	3.13	0.23	1.97	12.77
Career		115	46.9%	0.0%	63.1%	6.57	1.97	0.52	1.65	10.31

Totals
Year	Team	GP	FG	FGA	3P	3PA	FT	FTA	REB	A	BK	ST	PTS
2003-04	Massachusetts	28	97	234	0	0	65	116	137	38	19	41	259
2004-05	Massachusetts	29	103	202	0	1	59	102	156	39	16	50	265
2005-06	Massachusetts	28	101	221	0	0	77	107	193	55	18	40	279
2006-07	Massachusetts	30	151	306	0	0	81	122	269	94	7	59	383
Career		115	452	963	0	1	282	447	755	226	60	190	1186

== Coaching career ==
In April 2021, Tatum was named the head coach of the Varsity Blues women's basketball program at the University of Toronto. She had been named the assistant coach since June 2017 and became the interim head coach in 2020 after the retirement of Michèle Bélanger. After nationwide search, the school concluded that the two-time Olympian should be named as the head coach.

In May 2024, U of T announced that she would not be continuing as women's basketball head coach, and was leaving the university.
