= Karen Rocha =

Brazilian basketball player (born 1984)

Karen Gustavo Rocha (born 4 March 1984, in São Paulo) is a Brazilian basketball player who competed in the 2008 Summer Olympics.
