= Jaqueline de Paula =

Brazilian basketball player (born 1986)

Pinheiros Santo André
- Position: Guard
- League: Brazilian League

Personal information
- Born: February 17, 1986 (age 40)
- Listed height: 5 ft 10 in (1.78 m)

Jaqueline de Paula (born 17 February 1986) is a Brazilian basketball player for Pinheiros Santo André and the Brazilian national team, where she participated at the 2014 FIBA World Championship.

She was also a member of the Brazil women's national basketball team which competed at the 2015 Pan American Games.
