= Erika Valek =

Colombian basketball player (born 1982)

Personal information
- Born: April 9, 1982 (age 44) Bucaramanga, Colombia
- Listed height: 5 ft 6 in (1.68 m)

Career information
- High school: Coronado (Lubbock, Texas)
- College: Purdue (2000–2004)
- WNBA draft: 2004: 2nd round, 23rd overall pick
- Drafted by: Detroit Shock
- Position: Point guard
- Number: 33

Career highlights
- Frances Pomeroy Naismith Award (2004)
- Stats at Basketball Reference
Medals
Women's basketball
Representing Colombia
Central American and Caribbean Games
Bronze medal – third place	2006 Cartagena	Team

Erika Yaneth Valek (born April 9, 1982) is a Colombian former college basketball player for the Purdue Boilermakers.

== High school ==
Born in Bucaramanga, Colombia to Janeth and Juan Carlos Valek, she played for Lubbock Coronado High School in Lubbock, Texas, where she was named a WBCA All-American. She participated in the 2000 WBCA High School All-America Game where she scored six points.

== College ==
Valek, a point guard, won the Frances Pomeroy Naismith Award as the best women's college basketball player under 5'8" in 2004. She was also named to the 2003 All-Big Ten team and the 2003 NCAA East Regional all-tournament team.

== Purdue statistics ==
Legend
GP	Games played	GS	Games started	MPG	Minutes per game
FG%	Field goal percentage	3P%	3-point field goal percentage	FT%	Free throw percentage
RPG	Rebounds per game	APG	Assists per game	SPG	Steals per game
BPG	Blocks per game	PPG	Points per game	**Bold**	Career high

Year	Team	GP	Points	FG%	3P%	FT%	RPG	APG	SPG	BPG	PPG
2000-01	Purdue	33	212	41.4	38.8	68.6	2.5	2.8	1.7	0.1	6.4
2001-02	Purdue	30	228	40.5	37.8	79.4	3.5	2.7	1.6	0.1	7.6
2002-03	Purdue	**35**	**490**	**44.0**	**39.6**	**82.8**	**3.8**	**4.9**	**2.6**	0.2	**14.0**
2003-04	Purdue	33	289	41.2	36.5	76.7	3.8	4.0	2.0	**0.2**	8.8
Career	Purdue	131	1219	42.2	38.3	78.3	3.4	3.7	2.0	0.1	9.3

== Professional ==
She was drafted in the 2004 WNBA draft by the Detroit Shock and was traded with college teammate Shereka Wright and Sheila Lambert for Chandi Jones in a draft day deal to the Phoenix Mercury. Valek, however, was cut by the Mercury before the regular season and did not play for the team.
