= Palmira Marçal =

Brazilian basketball player (born 1984)

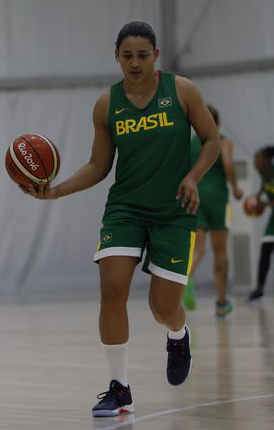

Sampaio Basquete
- Position: Shooting guard
- League: LBF

Personal information
- Born: May 20, 1984 (age 40); Reserva, Brazil
- Listed height: 5 ft 9 in (1.75 m)

Palmira Cristina Marçal (born May 20, 1984) is a Brazilian basketball player.

== Personal life ==
Marcal was born in 1984 in Reserva. She first took to basketball at the age of seven. She also liked athletics but looked to Janeth Arcain as a role model.

Marcal is part of the Brazil women's national basketball team. They reached the silver medal at the 2007 Pan American Games in Rio de Janeiro and the bronze medal in the 2011 Pan American Games in Guadalajara in Mexico. They won the gold medal in the South American Basketball Championship in Paraguay in 2006 and the same in Chile in 2010. They also participated in the World Basketball Championship in the Czech Republic in 2010. She represented Brazil in the basketball competition at the 2016 Summer Olympics.
