= Agostina Burani =

Argentine basketball player (born 1991)

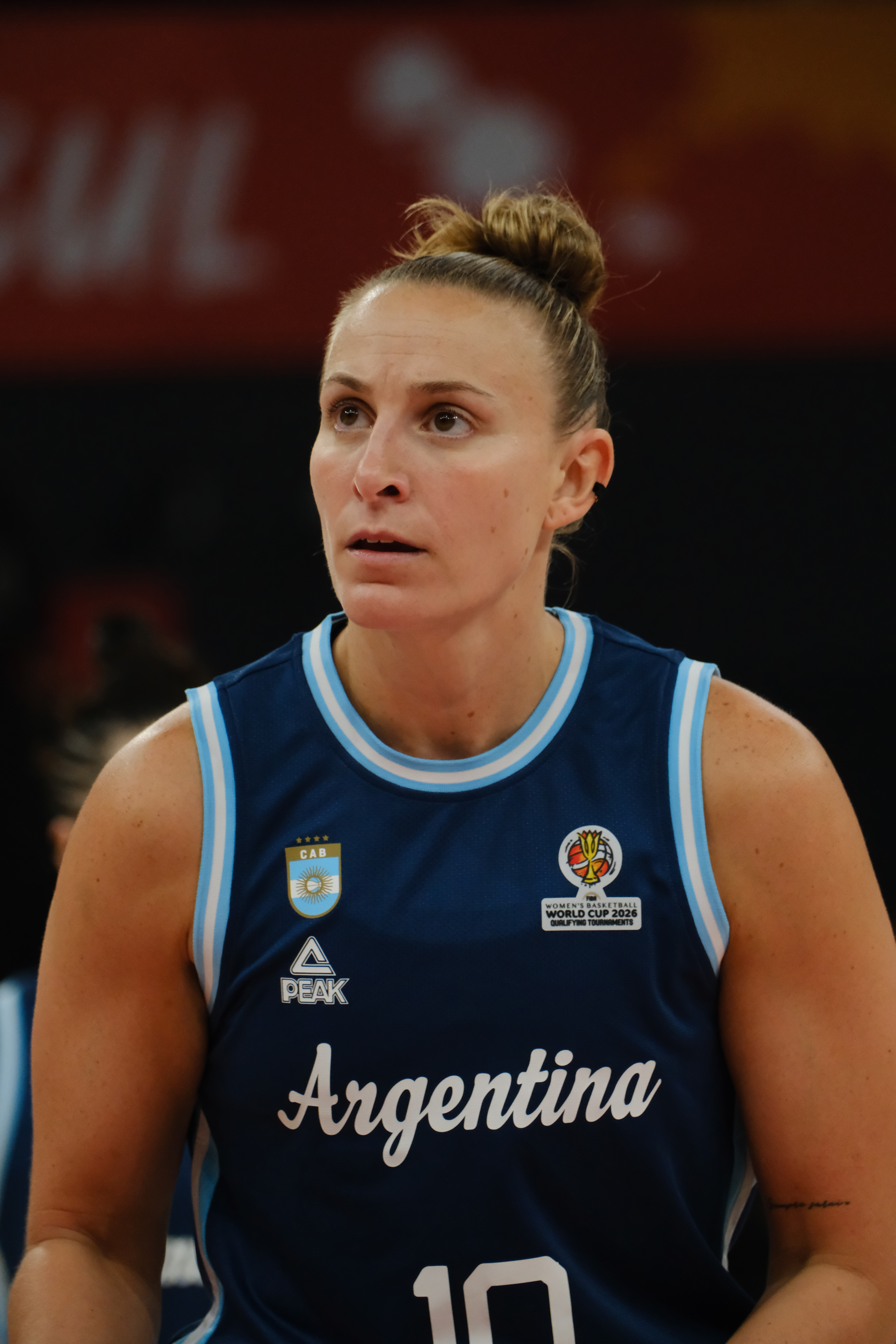

No. 10 – Union Florida
- Position: Center
- League: LNB

Personal information
- Born: 4 October 1991 (age 35) Lanús, Argentina
- Listed height: 6 ft 1 in (1.85 m)
- Listed weight: 176 lb (80 kg)

Career information
- WNBA draft: 2013: undrafted
Medals
Women's basketball
Representing Argentina
South American Championship
Gold medal – first place	2024 Chile	Team

Agostina Paola Burani (born 4 October 1991) is an Argentine basketball player. As of 2020 she plays for Union Florida and Argentina women's national basketball team.

She defended Argentina at the 2018 FIBA Women's Basketball World Cup.
