= Kim Gaucher =

Canadian basketball player

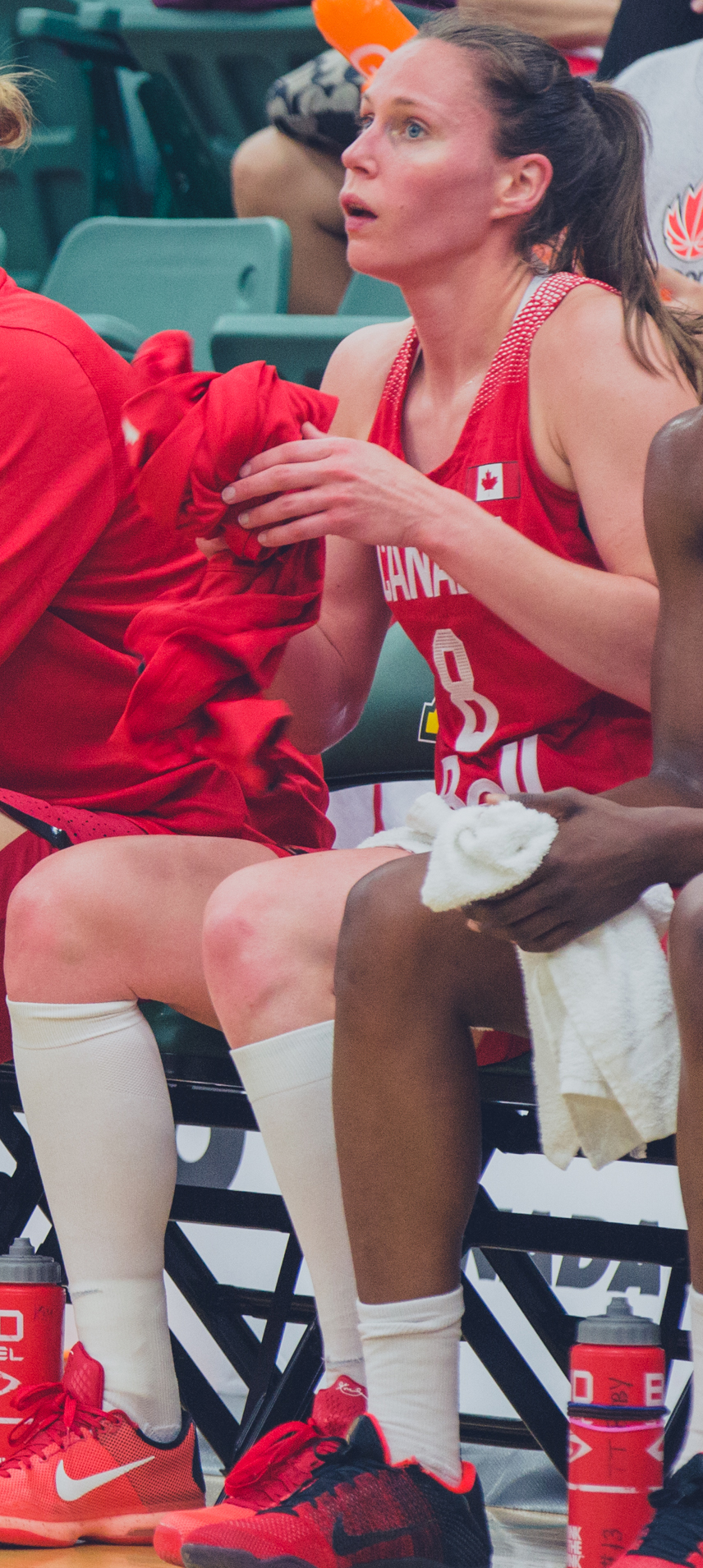
- Gaucher in 2016

No. 8 – USO Mondeville
- Position: Shooting guard
- League: LFB

Personal information
- Born: Kimberly Ann Smith; May 7, 1984 (age 42) Surrey, British Columbia, Canada
- Listed height: 6 ft 1 in (1.85 m)
- Listed weight: 159 lb (72 kg)

Career information
- High school: Heritage Park Secondary (Mission, British Columbia)
- College: Utah (2002–2006)
- WNBA draft: 2006: 1st round, 13th overall pick
- Drafted by: Sacramento Monarchs
- Playing career: 2006–present

Career history
- 2006–2008: Sacramento Monarchs
- 2007–2008: Dexia Namur
- 2010–2011: Ibiza
- 2012–2013: Tarbes Gespe Bigorre
- 2013-2014: ASPTT Arras
- 2015–present: USO Mondeville

Career highlights
- Third-team All-American – AP (2006); MWC Freshman of the Year (2003); 4x MWC Player of the Year (2003–2006); 4x First-team All-MWC (2003–2006)
- Stats at Basketball Reference
Medals
Women's basketball
Representing Canada
FIBA AmeriCup
Bronze medal – third place	2009 Brazil
Bronze medal – third place	2011 Colombia
Silver medal – second place	2013 Mexico
Gold medal – first place	2015 Canada
Pan American Games
Gold medal – first place	2015 Toronto	Team

Kimberly Ann Gaucher (née Smith, born May 7, 1984) is a Canadian professional basketball player for the USO Mondeville of the Ligue Féminine de Basketball. She played college basketball for the Utah Utes. She was drafted with the thirteenth overall pick in the 2006 WNBA draft by the Sacramento Monarchs.

== College career ==
She grew up in Mission, British Columbia and attended Heritage Park Secondary school before attending the University of Utah and playing for its women's basketball team.

She was named the Associated Press All-American Honorable Mention team in 2005, as well as the Kodak All-America Honorable Mention from 2003 through 2005. She also was named the Mountain West Conference Player of the Year in all four of her US college seasons, winning the award outright in 2003 and 2004 and sharing honours in 2005 and 2006.

Gaucher was the first woman to have her jersey number retired (No. 4) by the University of Utah.

== Professional career ==
She was selected by the Sacramento Monarchs as the 13th overall pick during the 2006 WNBA draft.

On March 20, 2009, she was acquired by the Phoenix Mercury along with guard A'Quonesia Franklin in exchange for forward/center Barbara Farris.

In 2010, she played 13 games for Palacio de Congresos de Ibiza in Spain. She did not play the entire season due to an injury sustained in January 2011.

== National team career ==
Gaucher played on the team representing Canada at the 2006 FIBA World Championship for Women held in Brazil from September 12–23, 2006. She contributed 9.8 points and 5.5 rebounds per game, helping Canada to a 10th-place finish.

Gaucher was on the team representing Canada at the 2009 FIBA Americas Championship for Women. She averaged 6.8 points and 4.4 rebounds per game, helping Canada to a bronze medal and a berth at the 2010 world championships. She continued with the team at the 2010 FIBA World Championship for Women held from September 23 to October 3, 2010, in the Czech Republic. She averaged 13.1 points and 4.8 rebounds per game, leading the team in scoring. The team finished 12th.

She was invited to join the national team, to play in the 2013 FIBA Americas Championship for Women, held in Xalapa, Mexico from September 21–28, 2013. She averaged 11.3 points and 7.2 rebounds per game and helped the Canadian National team to a second place, silver medal finish. Canada faced Cuba in a preliminary round and won 53–40, but in the championship game, Cuba prevailed 79–71.

In 2014, she continued with the senior women's national team at the 2014 FIBA World Championship for Women, which was held in Ankara and Istanbul, Turkey from September 27 to October 5, 2014. She was the leading scorer on the team with 8.9 points in 4.3 rebounds per game, helping the team to a fifth-place finish.

=== 2015 Pam Am games ===
Gaucher was a member of the Canada women's national basketball team, which participated in basketball at the 2015 Pan American Games held in Toronto, Ontario, July 10 to 26, 2015. Canada opened the preliminary rounds with an easy 101–38 win over Venezuela. The following day they beat Argentina 73–58. The final preliminary game was against Cuba; both teams were 2–0, so the winner would win the group. The game went down to the wire, with Canada eking out a 71–68 win. Canada would face Brazil in the semifinal.

Everything seemed to go right in the semifinal game. Canada opened the game with an 11–2 run on seven consecutive points by Miranda Ayim. Langlois contributed five assists. Canada strongly outrebounded Brazil in the third quarter and hit 69% of their field goals to score 33 points in the quarter. Lizanne Murphy and Nirra Fields hit three-pointers to help extend the lead to 68–39 at the end of three quarters. Canada dominated in the fourth quarter with three-pointers by Kia Nurse and Gaucher. Canada went on to win the game 91–63 to earn a spot in the gold-medal game against the USA.

The gold-medal game matched the host team Canada against the USA in a sold-out arena dominated by fans in red and white and waving the Canadian flag. The Canadian team, arm in arm, sang Oh Canada as the respective national anthems were played.

After trading baskets early, the US edged out to a double-digit lead in the second quarter. However, the Canadians, spurred on by the home crowd cheering, fought back and tied up the game at halftime. It was Canada's time to shine in the third quarter as they outscored the US 26–15. The lead would reach as high as 18 points. The USA would fight back, but not all the way, and Canada won the game and the gold-medal 81–73. It was Canada's first gold medal in basketball in the Pan Am games. Nurse was the star for Canada with 33 points, hitting 11 of her 12 free-throw attempts in 10 of her 17 field-goal attempts, including two of three three-pointers. Gaucher contributed five rebounds and five points.

=== 2015 FIBA Americas Women's Championship ===
Gaucher played for Canada at the 2015 FIBA Americas Women's Championship, a qualifying event used to determine invitations to the 2016 Olympics. The games were held in Edmonton, Alberta, Canada, in August 2015. Canada was assigned to Group A and played Puerto Rico, Chile, the Dominican Republic, and Cuba in the preliminary rounds. Canada won the first three games easily with a 94–57 win over Puerto Rico in the closest match. The final preliminary round game was against undefeated Cuba, a team Canada had faced in the Pan Am games. Cuba played well in that event and was expected to challenge Canada. However, Canada defeated Cuba 92–43 to win first place in the group for a spot in the semifinal against the second-place team in group B, Brazil. Gaucher scored nine points and recorded four rebounds.

The semifinal game against Brazil was much closer. Canada led by only six points at halftime but gradually expanded the lead to end up with an 83–66 win and a spot in the gold-medal game. The gold-medal game was a rematch with Cuba, who won their semifinal game against Argentina. Canada expected a closer game despite the lopsided result in the preliminary rounds. Cuba started strong and had an eight-point lead early in the game. Canada responded with a 16–0 run to take over the lead, but Cuba responded and took a small lead early in the second half. Then Canada took the lead back and gradually expanded the lead to end up with the win, 82–66. As the game wound down to the close, the crowd was chanting "Rio","Rio","Rio" in recognition of the fact that the win qualifies Canada for the Olympics in Rio in 2016. Gaucher scored eight points and recorded seven rebounds, second highest on the team.

== Career statistics ==
Legend
GP	Games played	GS	Games started	MPG	Minutes per game
FG%	Field goal percentage	3P%	3-point field goal percentage	FT%	Free throw percentage
RPG	Rebounds per game	APG	Assists per game	SPG	Steals per game
BPG	Blocks per game	PPG	Points per game	**Bold**	Career high

=== College ===
Year	Team	GP	GS	MPG	FG%	3P%	FT%	RPG	APG	SPG	BPG	PPG
2005–06	Utah	**34**	**34**	35.9	**0.524**	0.333	0.745	8.3	**3.0**	**1.9**	**0.6**	**19.3**
2004–05	Utah	**34**	**34**	**38.0**	0.502	0.374	**0.840**	**8.9**	2.6	1.5	**0.6**	17.8
2003–04	Utah	31	31	35.7	0.499	0.369	0.692	7.5	1.6	1.2	0.4	15.5
2002–03	Utah	31	31	34.7	0.476	**0.432**	0.813	6.3	1.5	1.1	0.4	17.4
Total	130	130	36.1	0.502	0.380	0.775	7.8	2.2	1.4	0.5	17.5	

=== Professional ===
Year	Team	GP	GS	MPG	FG%	3P%	FT%	RPG	APG	SPG	BPG	PPG
2006	Sacramento	31	0	10.1	0.333	0.406	0.556	1.3	0.6	0.3	0.0	2.4
2007	Sacramento	3	0	2.0	0.000	0.000	0.000	0.7	0.0	0.0	0.0	0.0
2008	Sacramento	21	0	6.8	0.255	0.083	0.667	0.7	0.2	0.3	0.1	1.6
2007–08	Dexia Namur	Statistics Unavailable										
2010–11	EBE-Ibiza	13	12	33.4	0.496	0.237	0.731	5.0	1.0	1.4	0.1	13.1
2012–13	Tarbes	10	-	33.4	0.500	0.380	0.750	6.1	1.2	0.9	0.2	10.7
2013–14	Arras	5	-	33.4	0.303	0.370	0.875	5.8	1.8	0.8	0.2	11.4
