= Jazmine Sepúlveda =

Puerto Rican basketball player

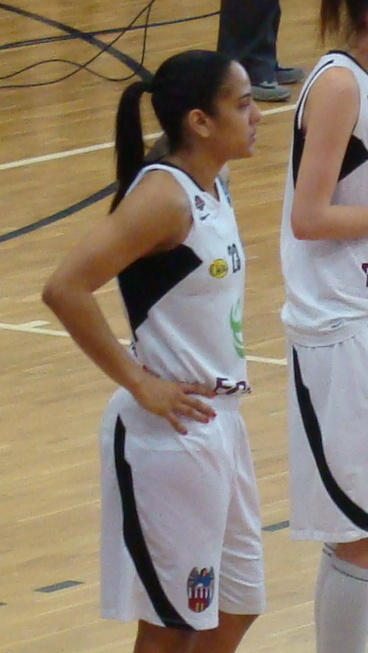
- Sepúlveda in 2012

No. 6 – Montañeras de Morovis
- Position: Shooting guard
- League: BSNF

Personal information
- Born: April 10, 1985 (age 41) Brooklyn, New York
- Listed height: 5 ft 10 in (1.78 m)

Career information
- College: South Florida (2007–2009)
- Playing career: 2009–present

Career history
- 2009–2010: Odra Brezeg
- 2010: Mets de Guaynabo
- 2010: Hapoel Tel Aviv
- 2011: BK Nitra
- 2011–2012: Katarzynki Toruń
- 2012: Gigantes de Carolina
- 2012–2013: CUS Chieti
- 2014–2015: Gigantes de Carolina
- 2016–present: Montañeras de Morovis
Medals
Women's basketball
Representing Puerto Rico
Pan American Games
Gold medal – first place	2011 Guadalajara	Team competition

Jazmine Sepúlveda (born April 10, 1985) is a Puerto Rican professional basketball player who currently plays for Montañeras de Morovis of the Baloncesto Superior Nacional Femenino (BSNF).

She was a member of the team which competed for Puerto Rico at the 2011 Pan American Games, winning a gold medal.
