= Lizanne Murphy =

Canadian basketball player

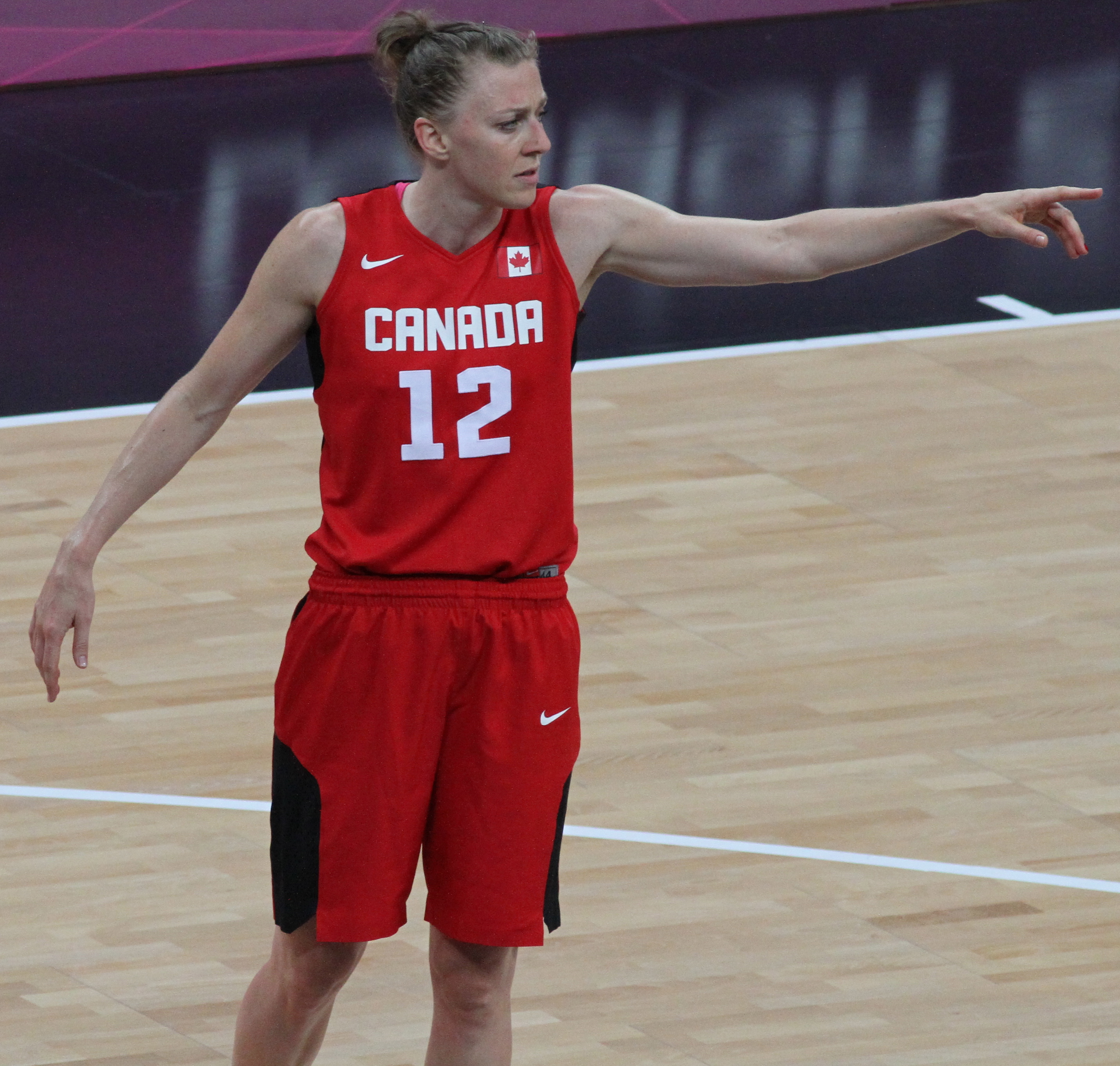

Angers BC 49
- Position: Small forward
- League: LFB

Personal information
- Born: 15 March 1984 (age 42) Montreal, Quebec, Canada
- Listed height: 6 ft 1 in (1.85 m)
- Listed weight: 165 lb (75 kg)

Career information
- High school: Dawson College (Westmount, Quebec)
- College: Hofstra (2003–2007)
- WNBA draft: 2007: undrafted
Medals
Women's basketball
Representing Canada
FIBA Americas Women's Championship
Silver medal – second place	2013 Mexico
Pan American Games
Gold medal – first place	2015 Toronto	Team

Lizanne Murphy (born 15 March 1984) is a Canadian professional basketball player. She plays for Canada women's national basketball team. She competed in the 2012 Summer Olympics and 2016 Summer Olympics

== Pam Am games 2015 ==
Murphy was a member of the Canada women's national basketball team which participated in basketball at the 2015 Pan American Games held in Toronto, Ontario, Canada 10 to 26 July 2015. Canada opened the preliminary rounds with an easy 101–38 win over Venezuela. The following day they beat Argentina 73–58. The final preliminary game was against Cuba; both teams were 2–0, so the winner would win the group. The game went down to the wire with Canada eking out a 71–68 win. Canada would face Brazil in the semifinal.

Everything seemed to go right in the semifinal game. Canada opened the game with an 11–2 run on seven consecutive points by Miranda Ayim. Miah-Marie Langlois contributed five assists. In the third quarter Canada strongly out rebounded Brazil and hit 69% of their field goals to score 33 points in the quarter. Murphy and Nirra Fields hit three-pointers to help extend the lead to 68–39 at the end of three-quarters. Canada continued to dominate in the fourth quarter with three-pointers by Kia Nurse and Kim Gaucher. Canada went on to win the game 91–63 to earn a spot in the gold-medal game against the USA.

The gold-medal game matched up the host team Canada against USA, in a sold-out arena dominated by fans in red and white and waving the Canadian flag. The Canadian team, arm in arm, sang Oh Canada as the respective national anthems were played.

After trading baskets early the US edged out to a double-digit lead in the second quarter. However the Canadians, spurred on by the home crowd cheering, fought back and tied up the game at halftime. In the third quarter, it was Canada's time to shine as they outscore the US 26–15. The lead would reach as high as 18 points. The USA would fight back, but not all the way and Canada won the game and the gold-medal 81–73. It was Canada's first gold-medal in basketball in the Pan Am games. Nurse was the star for Canada with 33 points, hitting 11 of her 12 free-throw attempts in 10 of her 17 field-goal attempts including two of three three-pointers. Achonwa contributed three points.

== Professional career ==
Murphy has played professionally in Finland, Lithuania, Slovakia, Poland and France, and is currently playing for Union Féminine Angers Basket 49 in France.

== Honours ==
In 2012 Murphy was awarded the Queen Elizabeth II Diamond Jubilee Medal.

== Hofstra University statistics ==
Legend
GP	Games played	GS	Games started	MPG	Minutes per game
FG%	Field goal percentage	3P%	3-point field goal percentage	FT%	Free throw percentage
RPG	Rebounds per game	APG	Assists per game	SPG	Steals per game
BPG	Blocks per game	PPG	Points per game	**Bold**	Career high

YEAR	SCHOOL	GP	GS	MPG	FG%	3P%	FT%	RPG	APG	SPG	BPG	PPG
2003–04	Hofstra	25	23	27.0	38.7	21.9	72.1	6.0	1.9	1.4	0.0	7.2
2004–05	Hofstra	29	29	**35.8**	**45.0**	36.0	73.0	**10.4**	**2.7**	1.0	**0.6**	**11.8**
2005–06	Hofstra	31	31	32.4	38.7	30.5	70.6	7.8	2.6	**1.5**	0.3	10.4
2006–07	Hofstra	**34**	**34**	33.6	43.1	**38.2**	**74.7**	8.7	2.2	1.3	0.3	11.4
Total	Hofstra	119	117	32.4	41.7	32.8	72.8	8.3	2.4	1.3	0.3	10.4
