= Ornella Santana =

Argentine basketball player

No. 12 – CD ZAMARAT
- Position: Power forward
- League: LFC

Personal information
- Born: 17 September 1990 (age 34); Buenos Aires, Argentina
- Listed height: 5 ft 11 in (1.80 m)
- Listed weight: 168 lb (76 kg)

Career information
- WNBA draft: 2012: undrafted

Ornella Soledad Santana (born 17 September 1990) is an Argentine basketball player for CD ZAMARAT and the Argentina women's national basketball team.

She defended Argentina at the 2018 FIBA Women's Basketball World Cup.
