= Oyanaisis Gelis =

Cuban basketball player

Oyanaisy Gelis
Santiago de Cuba
- Position: Guard
- League: LSB

Personal information
- Born: October 21, 1983 (age 43) Santiago de Cuba, Cuba
- Listed height: 5 ft 8 in (1.73 m)
Medals
Women's basketball
Representing Cuba
Pan American Games
Gold medal – first place	2003 Santo Domingo	Team
Bronze medal – third place	2007 Rio de Janeiro	Team
Bronze medal – third place	2015 Toronto	Team
Central American and Caribbean Games
Gold medal – first place	2006 Cartagena	Team

Oyanaisis Gelis González (born October 21, 1983) is a Cuban women's basketball player. Playing as a guard she won the gold medal with the Cuba women's national basketball team at the 2003 Pan American Games in Santo Domingo, Dominican Republic. Her first name is sometimes also spelled as Oyanaisy.

She was a member of the team which competed for Cuba at the 2015 Pan American Games, winning a bronze medal.
