= Ineidis Casanova =

Cuban basketball player

Santiago de Cuba
- Position: Guard
- League: LSB

Personal information
- Born: October 13, 1988 (age 38)
- Listed height: 5 ft 7 in (1.70 m)
Medals
Women's basketball
Representing Cuba
Pan American Games
Bronze medal – third place	2015 Toronto	Team

Ineidis Casanova (born 13 October 1988) is a Cuban basketball player for Santiago de Cuba and the Cuban national team, where she participated at the 2014 FIBA World Championship.

She was a member of the team which competed for Cuba at the 2015 Pan American Games, winning a bronze medal.
