= Miranda Ayim =

Canadian women's basketball player (born 1988)

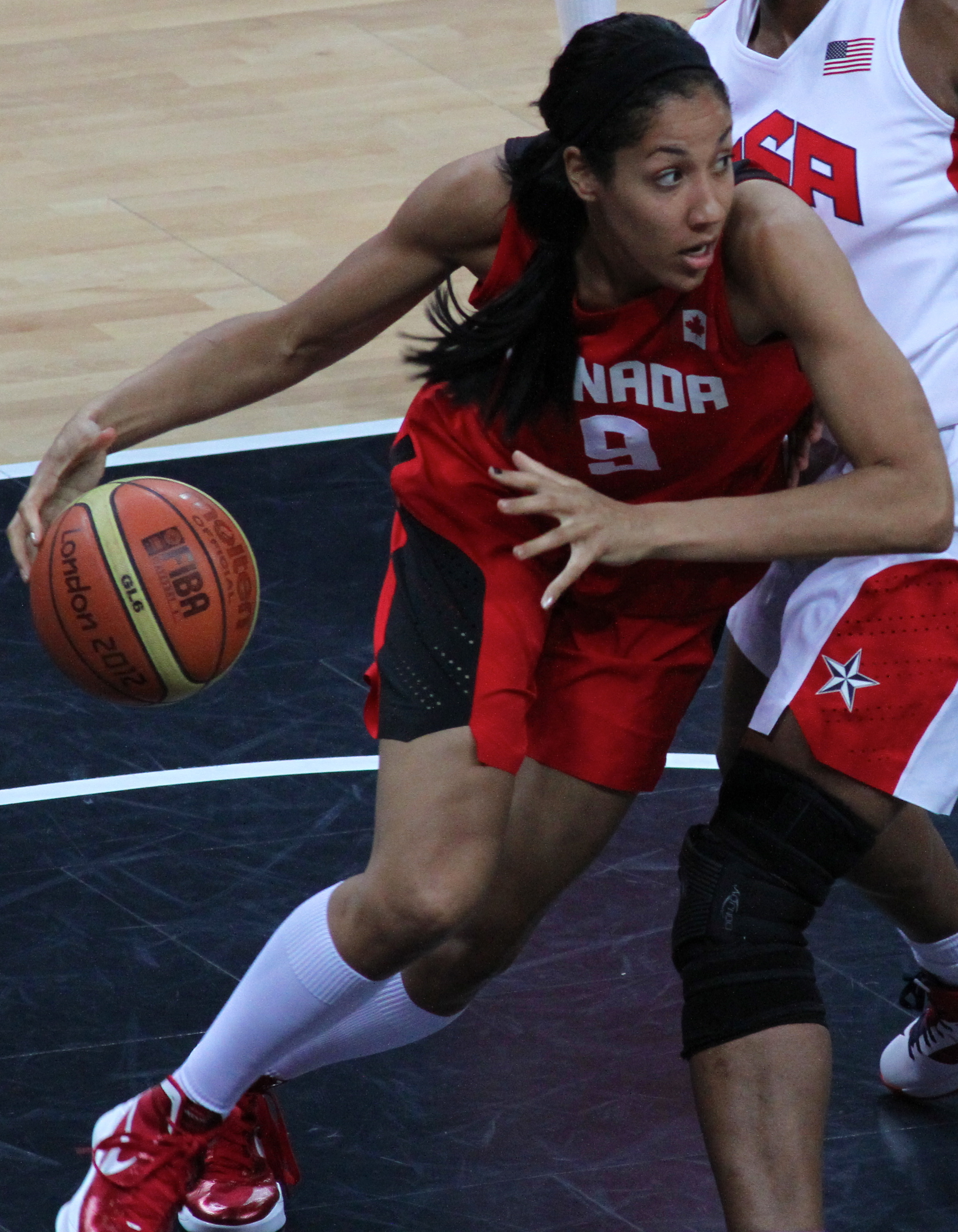
- Ayim at the 2012 Summer Olympics

Personal information
- Born: May 6, 1988 (age 38) Chatham, Ontario, Canada
- Listed height: 6 ft 3 in (1.91 m)

Career information
- High school: Saunders Secondary School (London, Ontario)
- College: Pepperdine (2006–2010)
- WNBA draft: 2010: undrafted
- Playing career: 2011–present
- Position: Forward

Career history
- 2010–2011: Alanya Belediye
- 2011: Tulsa Shock
- 2011–2012: İstanbul Üniversitesi SK
- 2012–2013: Orduspor
- 2013–2015: Toulouse
- 2015–present: Basket Landes
- Stats at Basketball Reference
Medals
Women's basketball
Representing Canada
FIBA Women's AmeriCup
Gold medal – first place	2017 Buenos Aires
Silver medal – second place	2013 Mexico
Pan American Games
Gold medal – first place	2015 Toronto	Team

Miranda Joy Ayim (born May 6, 1988) is a Canadian basketball player for Basket Landes in France. Ayim is a captain of the Canada women's national team and competed for Canada in three Olympics between 2012 and 2021.

== High school career ==
Ayim attended high school at Saunders Secondary School in London, Ontario. She was a starter for the varsity each of her four years. She was on the honor roll all four years and graduated as the valedictorian of her class.

== College career ==
Ayim played for the Pepperdine women's basketball team for the four years of her attendance. She set the school record for blocks, with 182 over her career. She scored 1377 points and recorded 735 rebounds, both of which were eighth-best in school history. She earned all West Coast Conference as a player three times, as well as All-Academics honors for the conference three times, the first time a Pepperdine women's basketball player was so honored.

== Canada national team ==
Ayim played on several Canadian national teams in FIBA competitions. In 2007, she played on the team which participated in the FIBA Under-21 World Championship for Women and finished sixth. Ayim averaged 6.2 points and 6.0 rebounds per game. She was also on the team which participated in the FIBA Under-19 World Championship for Women, finishing in ninth place. She averaged 9.8 points and 9.8 rebounds per game.

In 2012, she was selected and played for the Canadian national team, which finished 8th in the 2012 Summer Olympics. She averaged 1.2 points and 1.2 rebounds per game.

Ayim played for Canada at the 2013 FIBA Americas Championship for Women. She averaged 8.3 points and 5.4 rebounds per game, helping the team to a silver medal at the event. She continued with the team at the 2014 FIBA World Championship for Women, where she averaged 8.3 points and 5.4 rebounds per game.

Ayim was a member of the team which participated in the 2015 Pan American Games held in Toronto in July 2015. The team went undefeated and captured their first-ever Pan American gold medal, defeating the United States 81–73 in front of a large home crowd.

Ayim played for Canada at the 2015 FIBA Americas Women's Championship, held in Edmonton. The team continued their undefeated summer, winning the FIBA Americas title and qualifying directly for the 2016 Olympics.

Ayim became a two-time Olympian, representing Canada at the 2016 Rio Olympics; Canada finished a 3–2 in the group phase and fell to France in the quarterfinal match-up, finishing in 7th place.

In 2017, Ayim captained Team Canada at the 2017 FIBA Women's AmeriCup held in Buenos Aires, Argentina. The team went 6–0 in the tournament, defending their Americas title in a thrilling gold medal game against Argentina in front of a hostile and passionate home crowd. Ayim was named to the tournament All-Star Five team.

At the 2018 FIBA Women's Basketball World Cup, Canada finished with a 3–0 record in the group stage. Canada fell to host Spain in the quarterfinal, ultimately finishing the tournament in 7th place.

Ayim competed in her third Olympic Games in 2021; she was Canada's flag bearer in Tokyo alongside Nathan Hirayama.

== Professional career ==
Ayim was not selected in the 2011 WNBA draft. She was signed to a training camp contract by Tulsa after returning from a year of playing professionally in Turkey.

Ayim played three years in Turkey from 2010 to 2013 before making her French LFB debut with Toulouse in the 2013–14 season. She moved to Basket Landes for the 2015–16 season, marking her EuroCup debut.

== Career statistics ==
=== Team Canada ===
Year	Team Canada	GP	MPG	FG%	3P%	FT%	RPG	APG	SPG	BPG	PPG
2005	Youth	5	12.40	0.18	0.00	0.29	4.0	0.6	0.8	0.8	1.2
2006	Junior U18	8	13.13	0.33	0.00	0.45	3.6	0.4	0.5	0.5	4.1
2007	Young U21	8	24.75	0.42	0.00	0.47	6.0	0.4	0.8	1.0	6.1
2007	Junior U19	8	26.88	0.43	0.00	0.25	9.8	1.0	1.1	1.1	9.8
2008	Development	3	20.77	0.69	0.00	1.00	2.0	0.3	0.7	0.7	6.0
2010	Senior	9	12.29	0.36	1.00	0.50	2.4	0.4	0.6	0.6	2.2
2011	Senior	13	19.31	0.45	0.00	0.69	3.5	1.2	0.5	0.7	6.6
2012	Senior	18	15.02	0.25	0.00	0.65	2.8	0.9	0.6	0.5	3.1
2013	Senior	18	20.76	0.41	0.25	0.70	4.7	1.4	1.2	1.2	7.1
2014	Senior	19	23.84	0.50	0.25	0.78	4.9	1.0	0.5	1.1	8.9
2015	Senior	17	19.19	0.53	0.50	0.48	4.5	1.2	0.6	0.6	9.3
2016	Senior	17	21.27	0.47	0.60	0.67	2.8	1.5	0.6	0.6	8.4
2017	Senior	6	22.47	0.47	0.25	0.75	6.3	1.3	0.5	1.0	8.2
2018	Senior	15	22.56	0.54	0.43	0.79	3.1	1.2	0.7	0.5	10.3

=== Professional ===
Professional career statistics
Year	Club	GP	GS	MPG	FG%	3P%	FT%	RPG	APG	SPG	BPG	PPG
2010–11	Alanya BLD	22	-	31.7	0.484	0.000	0.764	8.1	1.1	1.5	1.9	12.8
2011	Tulsa Shock	3	0	14.0	0.444	—	0.000	2.3	0.7	0.7	0.3	2.7
2011–12	Istanbul Uni	16	-	26.4	0.430	0.000	0.520	4.4	0.8	1.2	1.3	9.4
2012–13	Orduspor	27	-	30.7	0.540	0.000	0.790	10.2	1.2	2.2	1.6	18.1
2013–14	Toulouse	23	-	31.3	0.496	0.000	0.877	7.0	0.7	1.3	1.1	14.5
2014-15	Toulouse	28	-	32.9	0.470	0.040	0.550	6.0	1.0	1.0	1.0	14.0
2015-16	Basket Landes	44	-	23.93	0.45	0.10	0.83	4.0	1.0	1.0	1.0	10.0
2016-17	Basket Landes	37	-	27.09	0.53	0.08	0.72	4.0	1.0	1.0	1.0	11.0
2017-18	Basket Landes	43	-	30.22	0.49	0.03	0.73	6.0	1.0	1.0	1.0	12.0
2018-19	Basket Landes	37	-	26.32	0.53	0.29	0.73	5.0	1.0	1.0	1.0	13.0

=== College ===
NCAA statistics
Year	School	GP	GS	MPG	FG%	3P%	FT%	RPG	APG	SPG	BPG	PPG
2006–07	Pepperdine	33	13	19.5	0.500	-	0.661	3.9	0.5	0.6	0.4	6.3
2007–08	Pepperdine	28	28	31.5	0.557	-	0.727	8.7	2.1	0.9	2.0	13.1
2008–09	Pepperdine	28	27	27.9	0.464	0.333	0.765	5.4	0.2	1.5	1.0	11.5
2009–10	Pepperdine	32	32	32.2	0.447	0.192	0.702	6.7	1.1	1.6	2.7	15.0
Career		121	100	27.6	0.484	0.219	0.712	6.1	0.9	1.2	1.5	11.4

Olympic Games
Preceded by Tessa Virtue; Scott Moir	Flagbearer for Canada (with Nathan Hirayama); Tokyo 2020	Succeeded by Marie-Philip Poulin; Charles Hamelin
