= List of women's national basketball teams =

This is a list of the women's national basketball teams in the world.

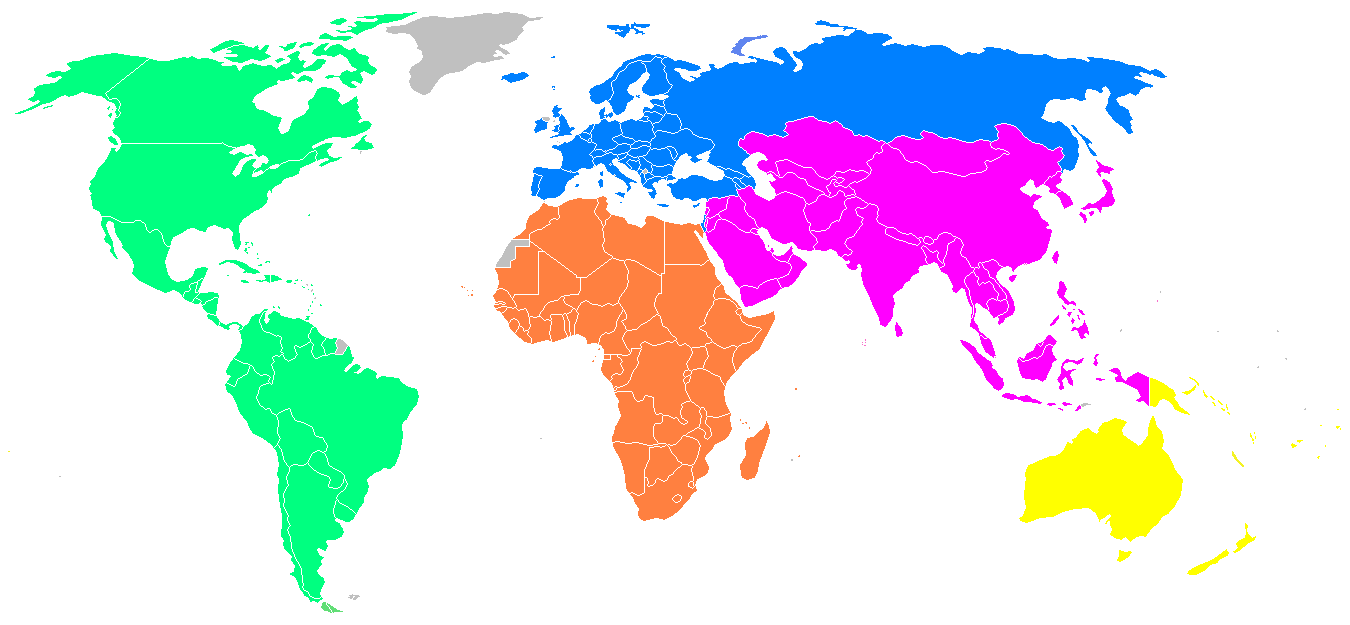
The five FIBA zones.

== Active teams ==
The International Basketball Federation, or FIBA recognizes 213 national teams divided into 5 zones, each roughly corresponding to a continent (North America and South America are grouped under the Americas.)

The newest national team is Montenegro which was recognized in 2006.

There are more FIBA-recognized teams than FIFA-recognized teams (209).

=== FIBA Africa ===
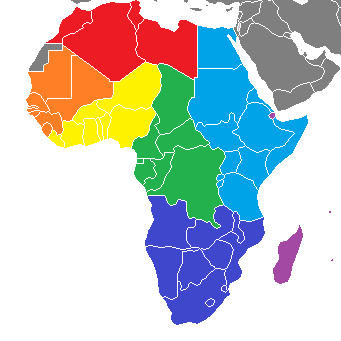
FIBA Africa subzones.

FIBA Africa, which has 54 national teams, is divided into 7 zones.

==== Zone 1 ====
- Algeria
- Libya
- Morocco
- Tunisia

==== Zone 2 ====
- Cape Verde
- Gambia
- Guinea-Bissau
- Guinea
- Mali
- Mauritania
- Senegal
- Sierra Leone

==== Zone 3 ====
- Benin
- Burkina Faso
- Ivory Coast
- Ghana
- Liberia
- Niger
- Nigeria
- Togo

==== Zone 4 ====
- Cameroon
- Central African Republic
- Chad
- Congo
- DR Congo
- Equatorial Guinea
- Gabon
- São Tomé and Príncipe

==== Zone 5 ====
- Burundi
- Djibouti
- Egypt
- Eritrea
- Ethiopia
- Kenya
- Rwanda
- Somalia
- South Sudan
- Sudan
- Tanzania
- Uganda

==== Zone 6 ====
- Angola
- Botswana
- Lesotho
- Malawi
- Mozambique
- Namibia
- South Africa
- Swaziland
- Zambia
- Zimbabwe

==== Zone 7 ====
- Comoros
- Madagascar
- Mauritius
- Seychelles

=== FIBA Americas ===
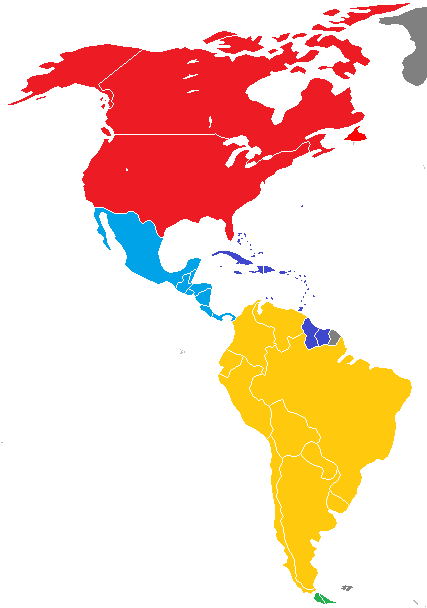
FIBA Americas subzones.

FIBA Americas (formerly the Pan-American Basketball Confederation), which controls North America, Central America, the Caribbean, and South America, has 44 national teams, divided into three areas. The Central American and Caribbean Confederations of Basketball (CONCECABA) is further divided into the Central America and Caribbean zone.

==== CONCECABA ====
===== Caribbean =====
- Antigua and Barbuda
- Aruba
- Bahamas
- Barbados
- Bermuda
- British Virgin Islands
- Cayman Islands
- Cuba
- Dominica
- Dominican Republic
- Grenada
- Guyana
- Haiti
- Jamaica
- Montserrat
- Puerto Rico
- Saint Kitts and Nevis
- Saint Lucia
- Saint Vincent and the Grenadines
- Suriname
- Trinidad and Tobago
- Turks and Caicos Islands
- Virgin Islands

===== Central America =====
- Belize
- Costa Rica
- El Salvador
- Guatemala
- Honduras
- Mexico
- Nicaragua
- Panama

==== North America ====
- Canada
- United States

==== South America ====
- Argentina
- Bolivia
- Brazil
- Chile
- Colombia
- Ecuador
- Paraguay
- Peru
- Uruguay
- Venezuela

=== FIBA Asia ===
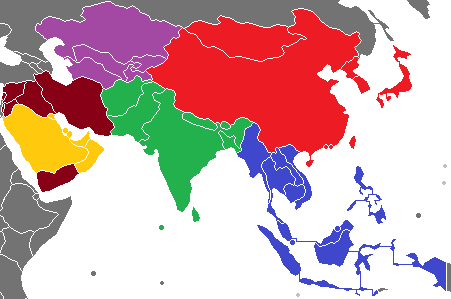
FIBA Asia subzones.

FIBA Asia (formerly the Asian Basketball Confederation) is divided into 5 zones.

==== East Asia ====
- China
- Chinese Taipei
- North Korea
- Hong Kong
- Japan
- South Korea
- Macau
- Mongolia

==== Gulf ====
- Bahrain
- Kuwait
- Oman
- Qatar
- Saudi Arabia
- United Arab Emirates

==== Middle Asia ====
- Afghanistan
- Bangladesh
- Bhutan
- India
- Kazakhstan
- Kyrgyzstan
- Maldives
- Nepal
- Pakistan
- Sri Lanka
- Tajikistan
- Turkmenistan
- Uzbekistan

==== SEABA ====
- Brunei
- Cambodia
- Indonesia
- Laos
- Malaysia
- Myanmar
- Philippines
- Singapore
- Thailand
- Vietnam

==== WABA ====
- Iran
- Iraq
- Jordan
- Lebanon
- Palestine
- Syria
- Yemen

=== FIBA Europe ===
FIBA Europe has 50 member nations under it.

- Albania
- Andorra
- Armenia
- Austria
- Azerbaijan
- Belarus
- Belgium
- Bosnia and Herzegovina
- Bulgaria
- Croatia
- Cyprus
- Czech Republic
- Denmark
- Estonia
- Finland
- France
- Georgia
- Germany
- Gibraltar
- Great Britain
- Greece
- Hungary
- Iceland
- Ireland
- Israel
- Italy
- Kosovo
- Latvia
- Lithuania
- Luxembourg
- Malta
- Moldova
- Monaco
- Montenegro
- Netherlands
- North Macedonia
- Norway
- Poland
- Portugal
- Romania
- Russia
- San Marino
- Serbia
- Slovakia
- Slovenia
- Spain
- Sweden
- Switzerland
- Turkey
- Ukraine

Great Britain, a combined team of England, Scotland, Wales and Northern Ireland will play at the 2012 Olympics and at the EuroBasket Women 2011, 2013 and 2015.

=== FIBA Oceania ===
FIBA Oceania has 22 member nations under it.

- American Samoa
- Australia
- Cook Islands
- Federated States of Micronesia
- Fiji
- Guam
- Kiribati
- Marshall Islands
- Nauru
- New Caledonia
- New Zealand
- Norfolk Island
- Northern Mariana Islands
- Palau
- Papua New Guinea
- Samoa
- Solomon Islands
- Tahiti
- Timor-Leste
- Tonga
- Tuvalu
- Vanuatu

=== Non-FIBA members ===
- Pitcairn Islands
- Transnistria
- Abkhazia
- Bonaire
- Curaçao
- Christmas Island
- French Guiana
- Guadeloupe
- Chuuk
- Pohnpei
- Falkland Islands
- Somaliland
- Martinique
- Mayotte
- Niue
- Northern Ireland
- Réunion
- Saint Pierre and Miquelon
- Saba
- Saar
- Saint Helena
- Saint Martin
- Sint Eustatius
- Sint Maarten
- South Ossetia
- Tokelau
- Northern Cyprus
- Vatican City
- Wallonia
- Wallis and Futuna
- Western Sahara
- Yap
- Zanzibar

== Defunct teams ==
- Czechoslovakia
- East Germany
- South Vietnam
- South Yemen
- Soviet Union
- Yugoslavia

== FIBA country codes ==
FIBA uses IOC country codes for most countries which are IOC members. For non-IOC members and exceptions, FIBA uses the following codes:

- England: ENG
- Gibraltar: GIB
- Marshall Islands: MIS (IOC: MHL)
- Montserrat: MAT
- New Caledonia: CAL
- Norfolk Island: NIS
- Northern Mariana Islands: SAI
- Scotland: SCO
- Tahiti: TAH
- Turks and Caicos Islands: TCI
- Wales: WAL
