= Basketball at the 2010 Central American and Caribbean Games =

Event held in Mayagüez, Puerto Rico

Basketball Mascot at Mayagüez 2010

The Basketball competition at the 2010 Central American and Caribbean Games was held in Mayagüez, Puerto Rico.

The men's tournament was scheduled to be held from 24–30 July, the women's tournament was scheduled to be held from 18–23 July at the Palacio de Recreación y Deportes, the Raymond Dalmau Coliseum and the Arquelio Torres Coliseum all in Porta del Sol.

Puerto Rico won gold in the men's tournament. The Puerto Rico women also captured gold.

== Men's tournament ==
=== Pool A ===
Team	Pld	W	L	PF	PA	PDIF	Points
Puerto Rico	2	2	0	335	133	+202	4
Mexico	2	1	1	141	154	−13	3
Jamaica	2	0	2	148	183	–35	2

25 July 2010

Mexico	62–77	Puerto Rico
Scoring by quarter: 8–15, 14–22, 15–26, 25–14

Arquelio Torres Coliseum, Porta del Sol

26 July 2010

Puerto Rico	104–71	Jamaica
Scoring by quarter: 29–15, 18–23, 29–16, 28–17

Raymond Dalmau Coliseum, Porta del Sol

27 July 2010

Jamaica	77–79	Mexico
Scoring by quarter: 14–14, 27–25, 15–16, 21–24

Arquelio Torres Coliseum, Porta del Sol

=== Pool B ===
Team	Pld	W	L	PF	PA	PDIF	Points
Dominican Republic	3	3	0	260	231	+29	6
Virgin Islands	3	2	1	236	219	+17	5
Panama	3	1	2	212	186	+26	4
British Virgin Islands	3	0	3	167	239	−72	3

25 July 2010

Dominican Republic	77–54	British Virgin Islands
Scoring by quarter: 29–10, 17–5, 12–23, 19–16

Arquelio Torres Coliseum, Porta del Sol

26 July 2010

British Virgin Islands	50–80	Panama
Scoring by quarter: 11–20, 9–19, 16–25, 14–16

Raymond Dalmau Coliseum, Porta del Sol

26 July 2010

Virgin Islands	98–103	Dominican Republic
Scoring by quarter: 19–11, 34–31, 27–28, 18–33

Arquelio Torres Coliseum, Porta del Sol

27 July 2010

Panama	53–56	Virgin Islands
Scoring by quarter: 16–8, 10–22, 18–12, 9–14

Arquelio Torres Coliseum, Porta del Sol

28 July 2010

British Virgin Islands	63–82	Virgin Islands
Scoring by quarter: 15–23, 16–26, 19–17, 13–16

Raymond Dalmau Coliseum, Porta del Sol

28 July 2010

Dominican Republic	80–79	Panama
Scoring by quarter: 25–15, 15–19, 30–26, 10–19

Arquelio Torres Coliseum, Porta del Sol

=== Medal round ===
Semi-finals
July 29 – Arquelio Torres Coliseum
Puerto Rico	89
Virgin Islands	72
July 29 – Arquelio Torres Coliseum
Dominican Republic	82
Mexico	85

Final
July 30 – Palacio de Recreación y Deportes
Puerto Rico	82
Mexico	77
Bronze-final
July 30 – Raymond Dalmau Coliseum
Virgin Islands	69
Dominican Republic	79

=== 5th–7th places ===
5th–8th places
July 29 – Arquelio Torres Coliseum
Jamaica	75
British Virgin Islands	68
July 29 – Arquelio Torres Coliseum
Panama	BYE
-

5th place
July 30 – Raymond Dalmau Coliseum
Jamaica	83
Panama	64
7th place
July 30 – Raymond Dalmau Coliseum
British Virgin Islands

== Women's tournament ==
=== Pool A ===
Team	Pld	W	L	PF	PA	PD	Points
Puerto Rico	3	3	0	284	121	+163	6
Virgin Islands	3	2	1	206	185	+21	5
Trinidad and Tobago	3	1	2	176	179	−3	4
Saint Vincent and the Grenadines	3	0	3	92	273	−181	3

18 July 2010

Virgin Islands	71–59	Trinidad and Tobago
Scoring by quarter: 16–11, 18–12, 17–19, 20–17

Arquelio Torres Coliseum, Porta del Sol

18 July 2010

Puerto Rico	118–24	Saint Vincent and the Grenadines
Scoring by quarter: 18–6, 33–5, 32–7, 35–6

Arquelio Torres Coliseum, Porta del Sol

19 July 2010

Puerto Rico	82–55	Virgin Islands
Scoring by quarter: 24–9, 28–19, 12–12, 18–15

Arquelio Torres Coliseum, Porta del Sol

20 July 2010

Saint Vincent and the Grenadines	44–80	Virgin Islands
Scoring by quarter: 6–27, 8–19, 19–20, 11–14

Arquelio Torres Coliseum, Porta del Sol

20 July 2010

Trinidad and Tobago	42–84	Puerto Rico
Scoring by quarter: 13–18, 11–26, 6–32, 12–8

Arquelio Torres Coliseum, Porta del Sol

21 July 2010

Saint Vincent and the Grenadines	24–75	Trinidad and Tobago
Scoring by quarter: 6–21, 5–20, 10–19, 3–15

Arquelio Torres Coliseum, Porta del Sol

=== Pool B ===
Team	Pld	W	L	PF	PA	PDIF	Points
Dominican Republic	3	3	0	252	179	+73	6
Jamaica	3	2	1	195	186	+9	5
Mexico	3	1	2	208	205	+3	4
Guatemala	3	0	3	173	258	−66	3

18 July 2010

Jamaica	63–56	Guatemala
Scoring by quarter: 17–11, 22–15, 15–13, 9–17

Arquelio Torres Coliseum, Porta del Sol

19 July 2010

Guatemala	65–85	Mexico
Scoring by quarter: 16–26, 12–22, 24–24, 13–13

Arquelio Torres Coliseum, Porta del Sol

19 July 2010

Dominican Republic	72–62	Jamaica
Scoring by quarter: 21–15, 16–13, 17–18, 18–16

Arquelio Torres Coliseum, Porta del Sol

20 July 2010

Mexico	65–70	Dominican Republic
Scoring by quarter: 21–10, 20–20, 10–19, 14–21

Arquelio Torres Coliseum, Porta del Sol

21 July 2010

Guatemala	52–110	Dominican Republic
Scoring by quarter: 12–29, 9–34, 18–29, 13–18

Arquelio Torres Coliseum, Porta del Sol

21 July 2010

Jamaica	70–58	Mexico
Scoring by quarter: 19–20, 23–7, 18–12, 10–19

Arquelio Torres Coliseum, Porta del Sol

=== Medal round ===
Semi-finals
July 22 – Arquelio Torres Coliseum
Puerto Rico	63
Jamaica	44
July 22 – Arquelio Torres Coliseum
Dominican Republic	92
Virgin Islands	66

Final
July 23 – Arquelio Torres Coliseum
Dominican Republic	69
Puerto Rico	81
Bronze-final
July 23 – Arquelio Torres Coliseum
Virgin Islands	58
Jamaica	69

=== 5th–8th places ===
5th–8th places
July 22 – Arquelio Torres Coliseum
Mexico	143
Saint Vincent and the Grenadines	31
July 22 – Arquelio Torres Coliseum
Trinidad and Tobago	76
Guatemala	81

5th place
July 23 – Arquelio Torres Coliseum
Mexico	79
Guatemala	49
7th place
July 23 – Arquelio Torres Coliseum
Saint Vincent and the Grenadines	26
Trinidad and Tobago	88
