= 2015 CBC Championship for Women =

22nd FIBA Women's Caribbean Basketball Championship

Tournament details
- Host country: British Virgin Islands
- City: Road Town
- Dates: 8–12 June 2015
- Teams: 8 (from 1 sub-confederation)
- Venue(s): 1 (in 1 host city)

Final positions
- Champions: Bahamas (4th title)
- Runners-up: Jamaica
- Third place: Virgin Islands

Official website
- www.fiba.basketball/history

The 2015 CBC Championship for Women was the 22nd edition of the Caribbean basketball championship for women's national teams. The tournament was played at the Multi-Purpose Sports Complex in Road Town, British Virgin Islands, from 8 to 12 June 2015.

This tournament also served as a qualification for the 2017 Centrobasket Women, where the top three teams qualified.

== Participating teams ==
- Antigua and Barbuda
- Bahamas
- Barbados
- British Virgin Islands
- Guyana
- Jamaica
- Saint Vincent and the Grenadines
- Virgin Islands

== Format ==
The tournament consisted of two stages. In the group stage, the teams were drawn into two groups of four, which were played in a round-robin format. The top two teams from each group advanced to the semifinals; the third and fourth teams advanced to the 5th–8th place playoffs.

All times are local (Atlantic Standard Time; UTC-4).

== Group stage ==
=== Group A ===
Pos	Team	Pld	W	L	PF	PA	PD	Pts	Qualification
1	Bahamas	3	3	0	203	156	+47	6	Semifinals
2	Virgin Islands	3	2	1	219	147	+72	5	Semifinals
3	Antigua and Barbuda	3	1	2	142	232	−90	4	5th–8th place playoffs
4	Saint Vincent and the Grenadines	3	0	3	167	196	−29	3	5th–8th place playoffs

Source: FIBA

8 June 2015
13:00

Boxscore

Antigua and Barbuda	72–64 (OT)	Saint Vincent and the Grenadines
Scoring by quarter: 15-10, 9-8, 13-16, 19-22, Overtime: 16-8
Pts: Nanton 30; Rebs: Nanton 13; Asts: Clarke 6		Pts: Joseph 21; Rebs: Adams 21; Asts: Joseph 5

Multi-Purpose Sports Complex, Road Town

8 June 2015
15:15

Boxscore

Virgin Islands	63–67	Bahamas
Scoring by quarter: 13-21, 21-12, 14-20, 15-14
Pts: Matthew 19; Rebs: Day 16; Asts: Javois, Hamilton 2		Pts: Armbrister 21; Rebs: Moss 12; Asts: Nesbitt 3

Multi-Purpose Sports Complex, Road Town

9 June 2015
14:00

Boxscore

Antigua and Barbuda	31–94	Virgin Islands
Scoring by quarter: 12-15, 4-22, 10-27, 5-30
Pts: Clarke 9 Rebs: 4 players 3 Asts: Clarke 2		Pts: Matthew 25; Rebs: Hamilton 9 Asts: Richards 8

Multi-Purpose Sports Complex, Road Town

9 June 2015
16:15

Boxscore

Saint Vincent and the Grenadines	54–62	Bahamas
Scoring by quarter: 18-9, 22-20, 7-20, 7-13
Pts: Joseph 19; Rebs: Gordon 14; Asts: Caesar, Joseph 3		Pts: Armbrister 16; Rebs: Moss, Neely 9 Asts: Delancy 4

Multi-Purpose Sports Complex, Road Town

10 June 2015
16:15

Boxscore

Bahamas	74–39	Antigua and Barbuda
Scoring by quarter: 22-7, 15-4, 21-18, 16-10
Pts: Petterson, Armbrister 12; Rebs: Moss 10; Asts: Nesbitt 5		Pts: Whyte 13; Rebs: Whyte 13; Asts: Clarke 2

Multi-Purpose Sports Complex, Road Town

10 June 2015
18:45

Boxscore

Virgin Islands	62–49	Saint Vincent and the Grenadines
Scoring by quarter: 15-8, 17-12, 22-16, 8-13
Pts: Matthew 19; Rebs: Hamilton 13; Asts: Matthew, Hamilton 3		Pts: Adams 20; Rebs: Adams 11; Asts: Caesar 3

Multi-Purpose Sports Complex, Road Town

=== Group B ===
Pos	Team	Pld	W	L	PF	PA	PD	Pts	Qualification
1	Jamaica	3	3	0	206	128	+78	6	Semifinals
2	Barbados	3	2	1	217	185	+32	5	Semifinals
3	British Virgin Islands (H)	3	1	2	141	201	−60	4	5th–8th place playoffs
4	Guyana	3	0	3	165	215	−50	3	5th–8th place playoffs

Source: FIBA
(H) Hosts

8 June 2015
18:45

Boxscore

Jamaica	75–57	Barbados
Scoring by quarter: 27-10, 9-11, 18-16, 21-20
Pts: George 24; Rebs: George 11; Asts: Smith 8		Pts: M.Cumberbatch, Studer 13; Rebs: Atherley 8 Asts: Atherley, Studer 2

Multi-Purpose Sports Complex, Road Town

8 June 2015
21:00

Boxscore

British Virgin Islands	64–61	Guyana
Scoring by quarter: 27-12, 11-18, 15-18, 11-13
Pts: Tam.Phillip 28; Rebs: Taf.Phillip 9 Asts: Tam.Phillip 5		Pts: Lewis 23; Rebs: McKenzie 17; Asts: McKenzie 3

Multi-Purpose Sports Complex, Road Town

9 June 2015
18:45

Boxscore

Guyana	43–70	Jamaica
Scoring by quarter: 10-18, 14-16, 10-17, 9-19
Pts: McKenzie 24; Rebs: McKenzie 11; Asts: Jacobs, McKenzie 2		Pts: T.Gordon 23; Rebs: Byfield 9 Asts: T.Gordon, Dell 2

Multi-Purpose Sports Complex, Road Town

9 June 2015
21:00

Boxscore

Barbados	79–49	British Virgin Islands
Scoring by quarter: 20-5, 18-16, 17-16, 24-12
Pts: Atherley 21; Rebs: D.Cumberbatch 9 Asts: Daniel 5		Pts: Jennings 14; Rebs: Tam.Phillip 11; Asts: Tam.Phillip, Jennings 3

Multi-Purpose Sports Complex, Road Town

10 June 2015
14:00

Boxscore

Guyana	61–81	Barbados
Scoring by quarter: 14-20, 23-29, 11-14, 13-18
Pts: McKenzie 25; Rebs: McKenzie 11; Asts: 3 players 2		Pts: D.Cumberbatch 29; Rebs: D.Cumberbatch 9 Asts: Daniel 6

Multi-Purpose Sports Complex, Road Town

10 June 2015
21:00

Boxscore

British Virgin Islands	28–61	Jamaica
Scoring by quarter: 13-14, 5-11, 1-21, 9-15
Pts: Jennings 10; Rebs: Taf.Phillip 13; Asts: Tam.Phillip 2		Pts: Johnson 12; Rebs: Johnson 12; Asts: George 5

Multi-Purpose Sports Complex, Road Town

== 5th–8th place playoffs ==
=== Bracket ===
5th–8th place semifinals
A4	Saint Vincent and the Grenadines	71
B3	British Virgin Islands	67
A3	Antigua and Barbuda	68
B4	Guyana	57

Fifth place game
Saint Vincent and the Grenadines	49
Antigua and Barbuda	57
Seventh place game
British Virgin Islands	73
Guyana	62

=== 5th–8th place semifinals ===
11 June 2015
14:00

Boxscore

Saint Vincent and the Grenadines	71–67	British Virgin Islands
Scoring by quarter: 17-18, 18-9, 15-20, 21-20
Pts: Adams 22; Rebs: Adams 14; Asts: Joseph 4		Pts: Tam.Phillip 27; Rebs: Tam.Phillip 29; Asts: Tam.Phillip 9

Multi-Purpose Sports Complex, Road Town

11 June 2015
16:15

Boxscore

Antigua and Barbuda	68–57	Guyana
Scoring by quarter: 21-13, 9-14, 18-16, 20-14
Pts: Edwards 20; Rebs: Nanton 11; Asts: Clarke, Nanton 3		Pts: McKenzie 35; Rebs: Ifill 11; Asts: Jacobs 5

Multi-Purpose Sports Complex, Road Town

=== Seventh place game ===
12 June 2015
14:00

Boxscore

British Virgin Islands	73–62	Guyana
Scoring by quarter: 15-15, 15-13, 24-10, 19-24
Pts: Tam.Phillip 21; Rebs: Tam.Phillip 13; Asts: Tam.Phillip 9		Pts: McKenzie 22; Rebs: McKenzie 16; Asts: Lewis 3

Multi-Purpose Sports Complex, Road Town

=== Fifth place game ===
12 June 2015
16:15

Boxscore

Saint Vincent and the Grenadines	49–57	Antigua and Barbuda
Scoring by quarter: 18-7, 12-23, 7-14, 12-13
Pts: Adams 18; Rebs: Adams 14; Asts: Adams 4		Pts: Edwards 17; Rebs: Clarke 11; Asts: Clarke 4

Multi-Purpose Sports Complex, Road Town

== Championship playoffs ==
=== Bracket ===
Semifinals
A2	Virgin Islands	52
B1	Jamaica	61
B2	Barbados	53
A1	Bahamas	57

Final
Jamaica	51
Bahamas	55
Third place game
Virgin Islands	98
Barbados	47

=== Semifinals ===
11 June 2015
18:45

Boxscore

Virgin Islands	52–61	Jamaica
Scoring by quarter: 4-16, 9-13, 17-12, 22-20
Pts: Matthew 13; Rebs: Hamilton 14; Asts: 3 players 2		Pts: Y.Gordon 19; Rebs: George 14; Asts: Smith 4

Multi-Purpose Sports Complex, Road Town

11 June 2015
21:00

Boxscore

Barbados	53–57	Bahamas
Scoring by quarter: 15-6, 12-12, 18-19, 8-20
Pts: D.Cumberbatch, Atherley, Studer 12; Rebs: Alleyne 11; Asts: D.Cumberbatch 4		Pts: Kelly 18; Rebs: Moss, Neely 15; Asts: Kelly 4

Multi-Purpose Sports Complex, Road Town

=== Third place game ===
12 June 2015
18:30

Boxscore

Virgin Islands	98–47	Barbados
Scoring by quarter: 27-11, 21-17, 25-14, 25-5
Pts: Matthew 20; Rebs: Richards, Hamilton 7 Asts: Frettt 13		Pts: D.Cumberbatch 12; Rebs: Metesh 7 Asts: 6 players 1

Multi-Purpose Sports Complex, Road Town

=== Final ===
12 June 2015
20:45

Boxscore

Jamaica	51–55	Bahamas
Scoring by quarter: 11-10, 20-14, 12-12, 8-19
Pts: Smith 15; Rebs: George 11; Asts: Smith 3		Pts: Armbrister 16; Rebs: Neely 17; Asts: 3 players 2

Multi-Purpose Sports Complex, Road Town

== Final standings ==
Rank	Team	Record
1st place, gold medalist(s)	Bahamas	5–0
2nd place, silver medalist(s)	Jamaica	4–1
3rd place, bronze medalist(s)	Virgin Islands	3–2
4	Barbados	2–3
5	Antigua and Barbuda	3–2
6	Saint Vincent and the Grenadines	1–4
7	British Virgin Islands	2–3
8	Guyana	0–5

Qualified for the 2017 Centrobasket Women

== See also ==
- 2015 CBC Championship (Men's tournament)
