= 2025 FIBA Women's Caribbean Championship =

25th FIBA Women's Caribbean Basketball Championship

Tournament details
- Host country: Guyana
- City: Georgetown
- Dates: 12–16 November 2025
- Teams: 5 (from 1 sub-confederation)
- Venue: 1 (in 1 host city)

Final positions
- Champions: Virgin Islands (1st title)
- Runners-up: Guyana
- Third place: Bahamas

Official website
- www.fiba.basketball

The 2025 FIBA Women's Caribbean Championship was the 25th edition of the Caribbean basketball championship for women's national teams. The tournament was played at the Cliff Anderson Sports Hall in Georgetown, Guyana, from 12 to 16 November 2025.

Virgin Islands won this competition for the first time.

This tournament also served as a qualification for the 2026 Centrobasket Women, where the top three teams qualified.

== Participating teams ==
- Bahamas
- Guyana
- Jamaica
- Suriname
- Virgin Islands

== Format ==
The all five participating teams played single round-robin in one group. The final standings of this group are also the final standings of the tournament.

All times are local (Guyana Time; UTC-4).

== Standings ==
Pos	Team	Pld	W	L	PF	PA	PD	Pts	Qualification
1st place, gold medalist(s)	Virgin Islands	4	4	0	360	211	+149	8	2026 Centrobasket Women
2nd place, silver medalist(s)	Guyana (H)	4	3	1	345	269	+76	7	2026 Centrobasket Women
3rd place, bronze medalist(s)	Bahamas	4	2	2	321	308	+13	6	2026 Centrobasket Women
4	Jamaica	4	1	3	259	311	−52	5	
5	Suriname	4	0	4	167	353	−186	4	

Source: FIBA
Rules for classification: 1) Points; 2) Head-to-head results; 3) Points difference; 4) Points scored.
(H) Hosts

== Results ==
12 November 2025
16:30

Boxscore

Suriname	47–86	Jamaica
Scoring by quarter: 8–37, 16–13, 8–23, 15–13
Pts: Peroti 14; Rebs: Leter 5 Asts: Marica 2		Pts: Reynolds 26; Rebs: Reynolds 9 Asts: Dixon 8

Cliff Anderson Sports Hall, Georgetown
Referees: Carmelo De La Rosa (PUR), Brooke Briscoe (CAN), Stevandrae Wells (BAH)

12 November 2025
20:30

Boxscore

Guyana	102–75	Bahamas
Scoring by quarter: 32–25, 16–15, 28–17, 26–18
Pts: Ramlall 33; Rebs: Brown 7 Asts: Brown 10		Pts: Nesbitt 35; Rebs: Nesbitt 6 Asts: Nesbitt 4

Cliff Anderson Sports Hall, Georgetown
Referees: Julirys Guzman (PUR), Carlos Pallares (COL), Gilbert Bognot (ISV)

13 November 2025
16:30

Boxscore

Bahamas	77–45	Suriname
Scoring by quarter: 20–15, 14–9, 24–5, 19–16
Pts: Higgs 35; Rebs: Braynen 13; Asts: Nesbitt 11		Pts: Jedinie 15; Rebs: Jedinie 11; Asts: four players 1

Cliff Anderson Sports Hall, Georgetown
Referees: Brooke Briscoe (CAN), Jose Antonio De Maria Gomez (PAN), Gilbert Bognot (ISV)

13 November 2025
20:30

Boxscore

Virgin Islands	78–54	Guyana
Scoring by quarter: 21–16, 23–8, 20–13, 14–17
Pts: George 23; Rebs: Ephraim 6 Asts: Tate 8		Pts: Adams 16; Rebs: Brown 15; Asts: Brown 3

Cliff Anderson Sports Hall, Georgetown
Attendance: 100
Referees: Carmelo De La Rosa (PUR), Carlos Pallares (COL), Sarah Mikaela Rodriguez Ferrari (HON)

14 November 2025
16:30

Boxscore

Suriname	33–84	Virgin Islands
Scoring by quarter: 4–25, 12–28, 9–10, 8–21
Pts: Pengel 12; Rebs: Peroti 8 Asts: three players 1		Pts: Jones 18; Rebs: Kleemann-Day, Romain 9 Asts: Tate 5

Cliff Anderson Sports Hall, Georgetown
Attendance: 100
Referees: Carlos Pallares (COL), Sarah Mikaela Rodriguez Ferrari (HON), Stevandrae Wells (BAH)

14 November 2025
20:30

Boxscore

Jamaica	56–88	Bahamas
Scoring by quarter: 20–23, 13–26, 9–18, 14–21
Pts: Bryan 15; Rebs: Bryan 8 Asts: Reynolds 5		Pts: Demeritte 25; Rebs: Braynen, Nesbitt 10; Asts: Nesbitt 11

Cliff Anderson Sports Hall, Georgetown
Referees: Julirys Guzman (PUR), Brooke Briscoe (CAN), Jose Antonio De Maria Gomez (PAN)

15 November 2025
16:30

Boxscore

Virgin Islands	93–43	Jamaica
Scoring by quarter: 26–8, 29–4, 24–25, 14–6
Pts: Ephraim 20; Rebs: Tate 7 Asts: Bough 9		Pts: Reynolds 17; Rebs: Reynolds 4 Asts: Robinson 3

Cliff Anderson Sports Hall, Georgetown
Referees: Brooke Briscoe (CAN), Stevandrae Wells (BAH), Sarah Mikaela Rodriguez Ferrari (HON)

15 November 2025
20:30

Boxscore

Guyana	106–42	Suriname
Scoring by quarter: 44–6, 21–13, 30–6, 11–17
Pts: Ramlall 25; Rebs: Adams 13; Asts: Brown 10		Pts: Pengel 10; Rebs: Slagveer, Vianen 4 Asts: Jedinie 2

Cliff Anderson Sports Hall, Georgetown
Referees: Carlos Pallares (COL), Jose Antonio De Maria Gomez (PAN), Gilbert Bognot (ISV)

16 November 2025
16:30

Boxscore

Bahamas	81–105	Virgin Islands
Scoring by quarter: 19–29, 25–27, 19–21, 18–28
Pts: Higgs 37; Rebs: Butler, Higgs 5 Asts: Nesbitt 7		Pts: George 26; Rebs: George 21; Asts: Ephraim, Tate 6

Cliff Anderson Sports Hall, Georgetown
Referees: Carmelo De La Rosa (PUR), Brooke Briscoe (CAN), Jose Antonio De Maria Gomez (PAN)

16 November 2025
20:30

Boxscore

Jamaica	74–83	Guyana
Scoring by quarter: 17–14, 18–20, 24–26, 15–23
Pts: Reynolds 23; Rebs: Robinson 8 Asts: Reynolds 5		Pts: Adams 24; Rebs: Brown 17; Asts: four players 3

Cliff Anderson Sports Hall, Georgetown
Attendance: 400
Referees: Julirys Guzman (PUR), Carlos Pallares (COL), Stevandrae Wells (BAH)
