= 2010 Centrobasket Women =

2010 FIBA Women's Centrobasket
17th Women's Central American and Caribbean Basketball Championship

Tournament details
- Host country: Puerto Rico
- Dates: July 10 – July 14
- Teams: 8

Official website
- FIBA Americas

This page shows the results of the 2010 Centrobasket Championship for Women, which was held in the city of Mayaguez, Puerto Rico from July 10 to July 14, 2010.

== Group stage ==
=== Group A ===
Team	Pld	W	L	PF	PA	PD	Pts
Jamaica	3	3	0	230	211	+19	6
Mexico	3	2	1	236	196	+40	5
Dominican Republic	3	1	2	254	231	+23	4
Virgin Islands	3	0	3	169	251	-82	3

July 10
14:00

Report

Mexico	82–81	Dominican Republic
Scoring by quarter: 24-20, 13-20, 23-14, 22-27
Pts: Erika Gomez Lozada 29; Rebs: Erika Gomez Lozada 10; Asts: Taine Ramirez Morales 5		Pts: Sugeiry Monsac Sierra 16; Rebs: Sugeiry Monsac Sierra 10; Asts: Carmen Graciela Guzman 9

Mayaguez

July 10
16:00

Report

Virgin Islands	62–73	Jamaica
Scoring by quarter: 14-16, 14-20, 18-24, 16-12
Pts: Tanecka Loreal Carey 19; Rebs: Natalie Nicole Day and Tanecka Loreal Carey 5 Asts: 3 ties with 2		Pts: Simone Edwards 21; Rebs: Vanessa Gidden 16; Asts: Nicole Zoe Louden 5

Mayaguez

July 11
14:00

Report

Jamaica	78–73	Mexico
Scoring by quarter: 20-14, 16-24, 24-15, 18-20
Pts: Simone Edwards 22; Rebs: Simone Edwards 13; Asts: Nicole Zoe Louden 7		Pts: Erika Gomez Lozada 19; Rebs: Erika Gomez Lozada 11; Asts: Taine Ramirez Morales 6

Mayaguez

July 11
16:00

Report

Dominican Republic	97–70	Virgin Islands
Scoring by quarter: 22-19, 33-17, 21-19, 21-15
Pts: Carmen Graciela Guzman 25; Rebs: Wanda Gomez Peguero 10; Asts: Johanna Morton Gautreaux 6		Pts: Yanique Monifa Javois 16; Rebs: Victoria Marie Hamilton and Julie Flanders 8 Asts: Tamara Petersen 4

Mayaguez

July 12
14:00

Report

Mexico	81–37	Virgin Islands
Scoring by quarter: 19-9, 9-11, 30-9, 23-8
Pts: Brisa Margarita Silva Rodriguez 23; Rebs: Alexis Piedad Castro Estrada 10; Asts: Erika Gomez Lozada 4		Pts: Tamara Petersen 10; Rebs: Tamara Petersen 9 Asts: Victoria Marie Hamilton 2

Mayaguez

July 12
16:00

Report

Jamaica	79–76	Dominican Republic
Scoring by quarter: 15-15, 12-19, 27-21, 25-21
Pts: Nicole Zoe Louden 33; Rebs: Vanessa Gidden 15; Asts: Nicole Zoe Louden 5		Pts: Carmen Graciela Guzman 27; Rebs: Sugeiry Monsac Sierra 8 Asts: Marbely Altagracia Montas 5

Mayaguez

=== Group B ===
Team	Pld	W	L	PF	PA	PD	Pts
Puerto Rico	3	3	0	286	135	+151	6
Trinidad and Tobago	3	2	1	246	174	+72	5
Guatemala	3	1	2	217	239	-22	4
Saint Vincent and the Grenadines	3	0	3	132	336	-204	3

July 10
18:00

Report

Saint Vincent and the Grenadines	54–105	Guatemala
Scoring by quarter: 5-35, 21-22, 18-28, 10-20
Pts: Sorayah Sharika Williams 22; Rebs: Sorayah Sharika Williams 10; Asts: 3 ties with 2		Pts: Blanca Rosa Amado Fergusson 25; Rebs: 3 ties with 5 Asts: Alma Sofia Lopez Valdez 6

Mayaguez

July 10
20:30

Report

Trinidad and Tobago	50–69	Puerto Rico
Scoring by quarter: 10-17, 8-19, 14-16, 18-17
Pts: Rhea Laurene Codio 11; Rebs: Sharmion Jessica M. Selman 13; Asts: Rhea Laurene Codio 5		Pts: Stephanie Elaine Rosado 14; Rebs: Jazmine Sepulveda 11; Asts: Pamela Zoe Rosado Roman 5

Mayaguez

July 11
18:00

Report

Guatemala	59–95	Trinidad and Tobago
Scoring by quarter: 14-26, 19-22, 18-21, 8-26
Pts: Blanca Rosa Amado Fergusson 15; Rebs: Alma Sofia Lopez Valdez 9 Asts: Alma Sofia Lopez Valdez 9		Pts: R.L. Codio and S.J.M. Selman 20; Rebs: Sharmion Jessica M. Selman 13; Asts: Rhea Laurene Codio 13

Mayaguez

July 11
20:30

Report

Puerto Rico	130–32	Saint Vincent and the Grenadines
Scoring by quarter: 37-9, 24-7, 39-8, 30-8
Pts: Michelle Pacheco 22; Rebs: Juanita Rivera Llanos 8 Asts: Michelle Pacheco 8		Pts: Sorayah Sharika Williams 17; Rebs: 3 ties with 5 Asts: Tenicha Afeefah Gittens 2

Mayaguez

July 12
18:00

Report

Trinidad and Tobago	101–46	Saint Vincent and the Grenadines
Scoring by quarter: 23-9, 22-9, 24-12, 32-16
Pts: Alicia Liverpool 20; Rebs: Tiffani Kafi Williams 13; Asts: Rhea Laurene Codio 10		Pts: Tenicha Afeefah Gittens 19; Rebs: Sorayah Sharika Williams 9 Asts: Tenicha Afeefah Gittens 2

Mayaguez

July 12
20:30

Report

Guatemala	53–87	Puerto Rico
Scoring by quarter: 6-27, 7-21, 15-24, 25-15
Pts: Maria Fleischmann Fischer 18; Rebs: M. Fleischmann Fischer and A.S. Lopez Valdez 7 Asts: Alma Sofia Lopez Valdez 4		Pts: Jazmine Sepulveda 16; Rebs: Stephanie Elaine Rosado 11; Asts: Lindsay Angelique Gonzalez 6

Mayaguez

== Knockout stage ==
=== Bracket ===
Semi-finals
July 20
Jamaica	62
Trinidad and Tobago	59
July 20
Puerto Rico	78
Mexico	63

Final
July 21
Jamaica	48
Puerto Rico	72
Third place
July 21
Trinidad and Tobago	65
Mexico	78

5th place bracket

Semi-finals
July 20
Dominican Republic	138
Saint Vincent and the Grenadines	31
July 20
Guatemala	63
Virgin Islands	79

Fifth place
July 21
Dominican Republic	94
Virgin Islands	55
Seventh place
July 21
Saint Vincent and the Grenadines	36
Guatemala	96

=== Classification 5-8 ===
July 13
14:00

Report

Dominican Republic	138–31	Saint Vincent and the Grenadines
Scoring by quarter: 36-12, 35-2, 34-12, 33-5
Pts: Charlenny Frias Henriquez 25; Rebs: Marbely Altagracia Montas 10; Asts: Carmen Graciela Guzman 11		Pts: Sheldeen Shamora Joseph 9 Rebs: Annette King 14; Asts: Sheldeen Shamora Joseph 3

Mayaguez

July 13
16:00

Report

Guatemala	63–79	Virgin Islands
Scoring by quarter: 10-21, 11-13, 18-21, 24-24
Pts: Blanca Rosa Amado Fergusson 26; Rebs: Maria Fleischmann Fischer 8 Asts: Alma Sofia Lopez Valdez 4		Pts: Yanique Monifa Javois 28; Rebs: Stacey Griffith 10; Asts: Victoria Marie Hamilton 7

Mayaguez

=== Semifinals ===
July 13
18:00

Report

Jamaica	62–59	Trinidad and Tobago
Scoring by quarter: 15-11, 15-11, 16-19, 16-18
Pts: Simone Edwards 17; Rebs: Simone Edwards 13; Asts: Nicole Zoe Louden 6		Pts: Rhea Laurene Codio 16; Rebs: Ayanna Amina Phillip 8 Asts: Rhea Laurene Codio 8

Mayaguez

July 12
20:00

Report

Puerto Rico	78–63	Mexico
Scoring by quarter: 17-23, 25-12, 20-9, 16-19
Pts: Carla Escalera 13; Rebs: Jazmine Sepulveda 12; Asts: Jazmine Sepulveda 4		Pts: Alexis Piedad Castro Estrada 19; Rebs: Alexis Piedad Castro Estrada 12; Asts: Brisa Margarita Silva Rodriguez 5

Mayaguez

=== Seventh place game ===
July 13
14:00

Report

Saint Vincent and the Grenadines	36–96	Guatemala
Scoring by quarter: 1-20, 17-19, 6-32, 12-25
Pts: Sheldeen Shamora Joseph and Annette King 8 Rebs: Saska Laneik Diamond 17; Asts: T.A. Gittens and S.S. De Shong 3		Pts: Emily Rosales Quan 18; Rebs: Maria Fleischmann Fischer 7 Asts: Alma Sofia Lopez Valdez 7

Mayaguez

=== Fifth place game ===
July 13
16:00

Report

Dominican Republic	94–55	Virgin Islands
Scoring by quarter: 25-14, 16-12, 22-16, 31-13
Pts: Charlenny Frias Henriquez 21; Rebs: Marlem Yinette Caceres Almonte 7 Asts: Johanna Morton Gautreaux 7		Pts: Yanique Monifa Javois 26; Rebs: Tamara Petersen 6 Asts: Tamara Petersen 6

Mayaguez

=== Third place game ===
July 13
18:00

Report

Trinidad and Tobago	65–78	Mexico
Scoring by quarter: 12-18, 24-22, 13-22, 16-16
Pts: Rhea Laurene Codio 22; Rebs: Tiffani Kafi Williams 7 Asts: Rhea Laurene Codio 6		Pts: Erika Gomez Lozada 19; Rebs: Erika Gomez Lozada 10; Asts: Monica Leticia Garcia Espino 8

Mayaguez

=== Final ===
July 13
20:00

Report

Jamaica	48–72	Puerto Rico
Scoring by quarter: 12-24, 18-13, 5-20, 13-15
Pts: Vanessa Gidden 20; Rebs: Simone Edwards 10; Asts: Nicole Zoe Louden 6		Pts: Jazmine Sepulveda 20; Rebs: Esmary Vargas Sanchez 5 Asts: Jazmine Sepulveda 6

Mayaguez

== Final standings ==
Rank	Team
1st place, gold medalist(s)	Puerto Rico
2nd place, silver medalist(s)	Jamaica
3rd place, bronze medalist(s)	Mexico
4	Trinidad and Tobago
5	Dominican Republic
6	Virgin Islands
7	Guatemala
8	Saint Vincent and the Grenadines
