= 2012 Centrobasket Women =

2012 FIBA Women's Centrobasket
18th Women's Central American and Caribbean Basketball Championship

Tournament details
- Host country: Puerto Rico
- Dates: July 12 – July 16
- Teams: 8

Official website
- FIBA Americas

This page shows the results of the 2012 Centrobasket Championship for Women, which was held in the city of Morovis, Puerto Rico from June 12 to June 16, 2012.

== Group stage ==
=== Group A ===
Team	Pld	W	L	PF	PA	PD	Pts
Puerto Rico	3	3	0	253	125	+128	6
Mexico	3	2	1	185	176	+9	5
Jamaica	3	1	2	161	200	-39	4
El Salvador	3	0	3	126	224	-98	3

June 12
15:45

Report

Mexico	77–44	El Salvador
Scoring by quarter: 24-10, 8-9, 23-8, 22-17
Pts: Maria Diana Orozco Gollaz 15; Rebs: Maria Diana Orozco Gollaz 10; Asts: Maria Diana Orozco Gollaz 5		Pts: Monica Xiomara Calderon Aparicio 11; Rebs: Gladis Marina Maravilla Osorio 9 Asts: Karla Xiomara Helena Leiva 4

Morovis

June 12
20:15

Report

Puerto Rico	82–53	Jamaica
Scoring by quarter: 16-16, 17-6, 21-19, 28-12
Pts: Jazmine Sepulveda 28; Rebs: Esmary Vargas Sanchez 6 Asts: Carla Daniela Cortijo Sanchez 6		Pts: Shenneika Satanya Smith 17; Rebs: Rhona Gillian McKenzie 9 Asts: Sasha Dixon 2

Morovis

June 13
15:45

Report

Jamaica	44–65	Mexico
Scoring by quarter: 8-17, 11-12, 12-19, 13-17
Pts: Tarita Tiffany Gordon 18; Rebs: Shenneika Satanya Smith 7 Asts: Zandria Cassandra Dell and Sasha Dixon 1		Pts: Maria Diana Orozco Gollaz 22; Rebs: N.M. Bibbs Moreno and A.S. Garcia Alvarez 9 Asts: Abril Selene Garcia Alvarez 3

Morovis

June 13
20:15

Report

El Salvador	29–83	Puerto Rico
Scoring by quarter: 11-20, 7-35, 6-15, 5-13
Pts: Veronica Lisbeth Sosa Quintanilla 19; Rebs: Veronica Lisbeth Sosa Quintanilla 6 Asts: Kenia Marcela Campos Castro 1		Pts: Jazmine Sepulveda 17; Rebs: Marie Placido Morales 13; Asts: Carla Daniela Cortijo Sanchez 3

Morovis

June 14
15:15

Report

Jamaica	64–53	El Salvador
Scoring by quarter: 18-4, 21-14, 7-17, 18-18
Pts: Shenneika Satanya Smith 17; Rebs: Rhona Gillian McKenzie 12; Asts: Tarita Tiffany Gordon 4		Pts: Veronica Lisbeth Sosa Quintanilla 13; Rebs: Monica Xiomara Calderon Aparicio 6 Asts: Veronica Lisbeth Sosa Quintanilla 4

Morovis

June 14
20:15

Report

Puerto Rico	88–43	Mexico
Scoring by quarter: 18-14, 19-12, 28-10, 23-7
Pts: Deana Ortiz and Esmary Vargas Sanchez 14; Rebs: Jazmine Sepulveda 8 Asts: Pamela Zoe Rosado Roman 6		Pts: Abril Selene Garcia Alvarez 10; Rebs: Nadia Marie Bibbs Moreno 7 Asts: M. Ornelas Aguire and A.S. Garcia Alvarez 3

Morovis

=== Group B ===
Team	Pld	W	L	PF	PA	PD	Pts
Cuba	3	3	0	262	161	+101	6
Dominican Republic	3	2	1	216	220	-4	5
Virgin Islands	3	1	2	185	194	-9	4
Trinidad and Tobago	3	0	3	135	223	-88	3

June 12
13:30

Report

Trinidad and Tobago	36–88	Cuba
Scoring by quarter: 4-25, 12-18, 12-24, 8-21
Pts: Rhea Laurene Codio 13; Rebs: Shakira Eileen Clarke 6 Asts: 4 ties with 1		Pts: 4 ties with 12; Rebs: Marlen Georgina Cepeda Valle 12; Asts: O. Gelis Gonzalez and A. Romero Moinelo 4

Morovis

June 12
18:00

Report

Dominican Republic	72–69	Virgin Islands
Scoring by quarter: 13-16, 28-19, 8-13, 23-21
Pts: Carmen Graciela Guzman 28; Rebs: Wanda Gomez Peguero 10; Asts: Anabel Lucia Perdomo Polanco 5		Pts: Victoria Marie Hamilton 17; Rebs: Victoria Marie Hamilton 9 Asts: Akkema Sherika Richards 8

Morovis

June 13
13:30

Report

Virgin Islands	58–49	Trinidad and Tobago
Scoring by quarter: 9-9, 21-19, 9-9, 19-12
Pts: Natalie Nicole Day 21; Rebs: Natalie Nicole Day 9 Asts: Yanique Monifa Javois and Akkema Sherika Richards 3		Pts: Shakira Eileen Clarke 11; Rebs: Miriam Simone Rita Seale 8 Asts: Rhea Laurene Codio 3

Morovis

June 13
18:00

Report

Cuba	101–67	Dominican Republic
Scoring by quarter: 30-7, 20-19, 27-24, 24-17
Pts: Leidys Oquendo Valdes 22; Rebs: Marlen Georgina Cepeda Valle 13; Asts: Arlenys Romero Moinelo 2		Pts: Lily Maceo Abreu Maceo 13; Rebs: Sugeiry Monsac Sierra 6 Asts: none

Morovis

June 14
13:30

Report

Cuba	73–58	Virgin Islands
Scoring by quarter: 22-12, 17-13, 18-14, 16-19
Pts: Suchitel Avila Cosanas 19; Rebs: Marlen Georgina Cepeda Valle 10; Asts: Ineidis Casanova Gonzalez 4		Pts: Natalie Nicole Day 19; Rebs: Natalie Nicole Day and Victoria Marie Hamilton 7 Asts: Akkema Sherika Richards 3

Morovis

June 14
18:00

Report

Dominican Republic	77–50	Trinidad and Tobago
Scoring by quarter: 18-6, 9-13, 29-18, 21-13
Pts: C. Graciela Guzman and A. Paniagua Cuevas 13; Rebs: Wanda Gomez Peguero 11; Asts: Carmen Graciela Guzman 6		Pts: Adanna Adjua David 12; Rebs: Melissa Guerrero and Rhea Laurene Codio 6 Asts: Rhea Laurene Codio 5

Morovis

== Knockout stage ==
=== Bracket ===
Semi-finals
July 20
Puerto Rico	73
Dominican Republic	47
July 20
Cuba	86
Mexico	42

Final
July 21
Puerto Rico	63
Cuba	78
Third place
July 21
Dominican Republic	79
Mexico	78

5th place bracket

Semi-finals
July 20
Jamaica	65
Trinidad and Tobago	60
July 20
Virgin Islands	68
El Salvador	57

Fifth place
July 21
Jamaica	61
Virgin Islands	49
Seventh place
July 21
Trinidad and Tobago	55
El Salvador	58

=== Classification 5-8 ===
June 15
13:30

Report

Jamaica	65–60	Trinidad and Tobago
Scoring by quarter: 7-15, 21-17, 15-15, 22-13
Pts: Sasha Dixon 22; Rebs: Rhona Gillian McKenzie 10; Asts: Tarita Tiffany Gordon 6		Pts: Pietra Luan Gay 18; Rebs: Adanna Adjua David 11; Asts: Shakira Eileen Clarke 4

Morovis

June 15
15:45

Report

Virgin Islands	68–57	El Salvador
Scoring by quarter: 14-13, 14-12, 18-11, 22-21
Pts: Natalie N. Day and Victoria M. Hamilton 12; Rebs: Victoria Marie Hamilton 7 Asts: Brittney K. Matthew and Akkema S. Richards 4		Pts: Veronica Lisbeth Sosa Quintanilla 17; Rebs: Gladis Marina Maravilla Osorio 5 Asts: Jessica Marisol Bautista Espinoza 3

Morovis

=== Semifinals ===
June 15
18:00

Report

Cuba	86–42	Mexico
Scoring by quarter: 22-9, 13-16, 26-8, 25-9
Pts: Leidys Oquendo Valdes and Suchitel Avila Cosanas 18; Rebs: Marlen Georgina Cepeda Valle 12; Asts: Ineidis Casanova Gonzalez and Leidys Oquendo Valdes 5		Pts: Frida Khiabett Gonzalez Martinez 9 Rebs: Maylene Ornelas Aguire 6 Asts: Nadia Marie Bibbs Moreno 5

Morovis

June 15
20:15

Report

Puerto Rico	73–47	Dominican Republic
Scoring by quarter: 13-13, 16-11, 25-9, 19-14
Pts: Marie Placido Morales 15; Rebs: Marie Placido Morales 9 Asts: Carla Daniela Cortijo Sanchez 5		Pts: Carmen Graciela Guzman 11; Rebs: Wanda Gomez Peguero 13; Asts: A.L. Perdomo Polanco and C. G. Guzman 2

Morovis

=== Seventh place game ===
June 16
13:30

Report

Trinidad and Tobago	55–58 (OT)	El Salvador
Scoring by quarter: 10-12, 17-8, 8-23, 16-8, Overtime: 4-7
Pts: Pietra Luan Gay 15; Rebs: Fanta Patterson and Miriam Simone Rita Seale 11; Asts: Shakira Eileen Clarke 5		Pts: Mirna Lorena Simon Hernandez 18; Rebs: M.X. Calderon Aparicio and M.L. Simon Hernandez 7 Asts: 3 ties with 2

Morovis

=== Fifth place game ===
June 16
15:45

Report

Jamaica	61–49	Virgin Islands
Scoring by quarter: 10-13, 10-10, 17-16, 24-10
Pts: Tarita Tiffany Gordon 17; Rebs: Rhona Gillian McKenzie 9 Asts: Shenneika Satanya Smith 6		Pts: Akkema Sherika Richards 14; Rebs: Victoria Marie Hamilton 11; Asts: 3 ties with 2

Morovis

=== Third place game ===
June 16
18:00

Report

Mexico	78–79	Dominican Republic
Scoring by quarter: 24-18, 19-19, 23-29, 12-13
Pts: Abril Selene Garcia Alvarez 24; Rebs: Abril Selene Garcia Alvarez 10; Asts: Nadia Marie Bibbs Moreno 6		Pts: Carmen Graciela Guzman 21; Rebs: Sugeiry Monsac Sierra 7 Asts: Carmen Graciela Guzman 9

Morovis

=== Final ===
June 16
20:15

Report

Cuba	78–63	Puerto Rico
Scoring by quarter: 19-16, 19-12, 26-20, 14-15
Pts: Leidys Oquendo Valdes 17; Rebs: Marlen Georgina Cepeda Valle 20; Asts: Arlenys Romero Moinelo 6		Pts: Carla Escalera 13; Rebs: Esmary Vargas Sanchez 8 Asts: Carla Daniela Cortijo Sanchez 6

Morovis

== Final standings ==
Rank	Team
1st place, gold medalist(s)	Cuba
2nd place, silver medalist(s)	Puerto Rico
3rd place, bronze medalist(s)	Dominican Republic
4	Mexico
5	Jamaica
6	Virgin Islands
7	El Salvador
8	Trinidad and Tobago
