= 2026 Centrobasket Women =

Tournament details
- Host country: Nicaragua
- City: Managua
- Dates: 12–18 July
- Teams: 8 (from 1 sub-confederation)
- Venue: 1 (in 1 host city)

Final positions
- Champions: Puerto Rico (6th title)
- Runners-up: Mexico
- Third place: Dominican Republic
- Fourth place: Virgin Islands

Tournament statistics
- Games played: 22
- Attendance: 6,318 (287 per game)
- MVP: (Puerto Rico) Imani McGee-Stafford
- Top scorer: (Nicaragua) Kiyomi McMiller (147 points)

Official website
- Managua 2026

The 2026 Centrobasket Women, officially branded as the 2027 FIBA Women's AmeriCup Centrobasket Qualifiers, was the 25th edition of the women's Central American and Caribbean basketball championship. Eight teams competed in the tournament, which took place at Polideportivo Alexis Argüello in Managua, Nicaragua, from 12 to 18 July 2026.

The top three teams qualified for the 2027 FIBA Women's AmeriCup, where they will join the host, El Salvador.

Puerto Rico came into the tournament as four-time defending champions after beating Dominican Republic 95–81 in the 2024 final in Irapuato. Puerto Rico secured their sixth overall title with a victory over Mexico in the final, 82–68. As the top three finishers, Puerto Rico, Mexico and Dominican Republic qualified for the 2027 FIBA Women's AmeriCup.

== Qualification ==
Qualifying tournaments took place between July and November 2025, consisting of two tournaments; teams from Central America competed in the 2025 FIBA COCABA Championship for Women and the Caribbean teams played the 2025 FIBA Women's Caribbean Championship, respectively.

The top three from each championship qualify. Costa Rica, Cuba and Guatemala who participated in the previous edition, didn't qualify and were replaced by Bahamas, Guyana and Nicaragua.

As of 2028, this is the last time Costa Rica, Cuba and Guatemala didn't qualify.

Qualification	Host	Dates	Vacancies	Qualified
Automatic entry	–		2	Dominican Republic; Puerto Rico
2025 COCABA Championship	(Nicaragua) Managua	22–27 July 2025	3	Mexico; El Salvador; Nicaragua (H)
2025 Caribbean Championship	(Guyana) Georgetown	12–16 November 2025	3	Virgin Islands; Guyana; Bahamas

== Venue ==
The venue for the entire competition was the Polideportivo Alexis Argüello in Nicaragua's capital, Managua. The venue has hosted numerous basketball tournaments, including the 2025 FIBA COCABA Championship for Women and 2025 FIBA AmeriCup. Other competitions held in the arena include Basketball, Boxing and Volleyball at the 2017 Central American Games and the 2024 CONCACAF Futsal Championship.

2026 Centrobasket Women is located in Nicaragua	Managua
2026 Centrobasket Women is located in Nicaragua	Polideportivo Alexis Argüello
2026 Centrobasket Women is located in Nicaragua	Capacity: 8,000

== Draw ==
The draw took place on 4 May 2026 at 13:30 EST at the FIBA Americas’ regional office in Miami, United States. The draw was hosted by competitions manager for FIBA Americas, Oswaldo Piñeiro. The draw started with, in order, pots 1, 2, 3 and 4 being drawn, with each team selected then allocated into the first available group alphabetically. The position for the team within the group would then be drawn (for the purpose of the schedule). Regarding restrictions, a maximum of two teams from COCABA were allowed in a group.

- 2026 Centrobasket Women – Draw
- Draw Live Stream

=== Seeding ===
The seeding was based on the FIBA Women's World Ranking as of 1 April 2026.

Pot 1
Team	Pos
Puerto Rico	13
Mexico	31

Pot 2
Team	Pos
Dominican Republic	36
El Salvador	51

Pot 3
Team	Pos
Virgin Islands	64
Bahamas	87

Pot 4
Team	Pos
Nicaragua (H)	91
Guyana	118

=== Draw results ===
Group A
Pos	Team
A1	Dominican Republic
A2	Nicaragua (H)
A3	Mexico
A4	Bahamas

Group B
Pos	Team
B1	Puerto Rico
B2	El Salvador
B3	Guyana
B4	Virgin Islands

=== Schedule ===
Schedule
Round	Gameday	Date
Preliminary round	Gameday 1	12 July 2026
Preliminary round	Gameday 2	13 July 2026
Preliminary round	Gameday 3	15 July 2026
Final round	Qualification to semifinals	16 July 2026
Final round	Semi-finals	17 July 2026
Final round	Third place Final	18 July 2026

== Squads ==
Each nation has to submit a list of 12 players.

== Referees ==
The following 13 referees were selected for the tournament.

- (Argentina) Franco Anselmo
- (Argentina) Romina Belén Morales Ibarra
- (The Bahamas) Stevandrae Wells
- (Brazil) Mirian Moraes
- (Canada) Carriera Lamoureux
- (Chile) Mariajesus Rocio Gonzalez Chaparro
- (Colombia) Carlos Pallares
- (Dominican Republic) Winker Mateo
- (Honduras) Sarah Rodriguez
- (Mexico) Krishna Dominguez
- (Nicaragua) Elisha Lashawn Ullith Hodgson
- (Venezuela) Daniel Garcia
- (Uruguay) Aline García

== Format ==
The teams were drawn into two groups of four. The group winners advanced directly to the semifinals. The second- and third-placed teams from both groups advanced to the quarterfinals. The bottom teams were dropped to the 5th–8th place playoffs, where they played against the losing quarterfinalists.

== Group phase ==
- The schedule was announced on 24 June 2026.
- All times are local (Central Standard Time; UTC−6).

=== Classification of teams ===
1. Highest number of points earned, with each game result having a corresponding point:
  - Win: 2 points
  - Loss: 1 point
  - Loss by default: 1 point, with a final score of 2–0 for the opponents of the defaulting team if the latter team is not trailing or if the score is tied, or the score at the time of stoppage if they are trailing.
  - Loss by forfeit: 0 points, with a final score of 20–0 for the opponents of the forfeiting team.
2. Head-to-head record via points system above
3. Point difference in games among tied teams
4. Points for in games among tied teams
5. Point difference in all group games
6. Points for in all group games

=== Group A ===
Pos	Team	Pld	W	L	PF	PA	PD	Pts	Qualification
1	Mexico	3	3	0	259	197	+62	6	Semifinals
2	Dominican Republic	3	2	1	226	198	+28	5	Quarterfinals
3	Bahamas	3	1	2	209	220	−11	4	Quarterfinals
4	Nicaragua (H)	3	0	3	187	266	−79	3	5th–8th place semifinals

Source: FIBA
Rules for classification: 1) Points; 2) Head-to-head results; 3) Points difference; 4) Points scored.
(H) Hosts

12 July 2026
17:00

Boxscore

Dominican Republic	72–69	Bahamas
Scoring by quarter: 20–23, 19–24, 9–12, 24–10
Pts: Capellan 20; Rebs: Martinez 11; Asts: Batista 3		Pts: Higgs 25; Rebs: Nesbitt 9 Asts: Nesbitt 5

Polideportivo Alexis Argüello, Managua
Attendance: 300
Referees: Aline García (URU), Romina Belén Morales Ibarra (ARG), Carriera Lamoureux (CAN)

12 July 2026
19:30

Boxscore

Nicaragua	66–103	Mexico
Scoring by quarter: 19–24, 15–28, 25–28, 7–23
Pts: McMiller 36; Rebs: McMiller 9 Asts: Gamble 3		Pts: Jeffries 20; Rebs: Jeffries 12; Asts: Pitts 7

Polideportivo Alexis Argüello, Managua
Attendance: 550
Referees: Daniel Garcia (VEN), Mariajesus Rocio Gonzalez Chaparro (CHI), Sarah Rodriguez (HON)

13 July 2026
17:00

Boxscore

Mexico	75–64	Dominican Republic
Scoring by quarter: 15–20, 22–16, 21–13, 17–15
Pts: Pitts 22; Rebs: Valenzuela 15; Asts: Pitts 9		Pts: Capellan 21; Rebs: Capellan 8 Asts: Queliz 3

Polideportivo Alexis Argüello, Managua
Attendance: 163
Referees: Daniel Garcia (VEN), Carlos Pallares (COL), Sarah Rodriguez (HON)

13 July 2026
19:30

Boxscore

Bahamas	73–67	Nicaragua
Scoring by quarter: 21–21, 15–14, 21–15, 16–17
Pts: Higgs 25; Rebs: Collins, Moultrie 10; Asts: Collins, Higgs 3		Pts: McMiller 21; Rebs: McMiller 11; Asts: McMiller 9

Polideportivo Alexis Argüello, Managua
Attendance: 1,600
Referees: Krishna Dominguez (MEX), Romina Belén Morales Ibarra (ARG), Mirian Moraes (BRA)

15 July 2026
12:00

Boxscore

Mexico	81–67	Bahamas
Scoring by quarter: 14–20, 24–15, 29–17, 14–15
Pts: Chavez 16; Rebs: Valenzuela 10; Asts: Pitts 6		Pts: Higgs 23; Rebs: Collins 7 Asts: Nesbitt 3

Polideportivo Alexis Argüello, Managua
Attendance: 120
Referees: Orlando Varela (HON), Mirian Moraes (BRA), Carriera Lamoureux (CAN)

15 July 2026
19:30

Boxscore

Nicaragua	54–90	Dominican Republic
Scoring by quarter: 15–25, 14–23, 12–21, 13–21
Pts: McMiller 24; Rebs: McMiller 8 Asts: Hodgson, McMiller 2		Pts: Martinez 21; Rebs: Almon 12; Asts: Jimenez 7

Polideportivo Alexis Argüello, Managua
Attendance: 800
Referees: Aline García (URU), Mariajesus Rocio Gonzalez Chaparro (CHI), Romina Belén Morales Ibarra (ARG)

=== Group B ===
Pos	Team	Pld	W	L	PF	PA	PD	Pts	Qualification
1	Puerto Rico	3	3	0	273	159	+114	6	Semifinals
2	Virgin Islands	3	2	1	246	199	+47	5	Quarterfinals
3	El Salvador	3	1	2	166	267	−101	4	Quarterfinals
4	Guyana	3	0	3	205	265	−60	3	5th–8th place semifinals

Source: FIBA
Rules for classification: 1) Points; 2) Head-to-head results; 3) Points difference; 4) Points scored.

12 July 2026
12:00

Boxscore

El Salvador	85–84 (OT)	Guyana
Scoring by quarter: 6–23, 20–20, 29–19, 20–13, Overtime: 10–9
Pts: Harvey-Carr 31; Rebs: Harvey-Carr 12; Asts: Alfaro, Tevez 7		Pts: R. Adams 33; Rebs: Adams 15; Asts: J. Adams 10

Polideportivo Alexis Argüello, Managua
Attendance: 200
Referees: Carlos Pallares (COL), Winker Mateo (DOM), Stevandrae Wells (BAH)

12 July 2026
14:30

Boxscore

Puerto Rico	81–75	Virgin Islands
Scoring by quarter: 22–18, 23–16, 18–15, 18–26
Pts: Gonzalez 21; Rebs: McGee-Stafford 13; Asts: Rosado 8		Pts: George 28; Rebs: George 12; Asts: Bough, Ephraim 5

Polideportivo Alexis Argüello, Managua
Attendance: 185
Referees: Franco Anselmo (ARG), Mirian Moraes (BRA), Elisha Lashawn Ullith Hodgson (NCA)

13 July 2026
12:00

Boxscore

Virgin Islands	84–47	El Salvador
Scoring by quarter: 27–12, 21–10, 17–16, 19–9
Pts: Ephraim 17; Rebs: George 13; Asts: Bough 8		Pts: Tevez 11; Rebs: Harvey-Carr 8 Asts: Alfaro 4

Polideportivo Alexis Argüello, Managua
Attendance: 100
Referees: Orlando Varela (HON), Franco Anselmo (ARG), Winker Mateo (DOM)

13 July 2026
14:30

Boxscore

Guyana	50–93	Puerto Rico
Scoring by quarter: 13–26, 13–25, 14–16, 10–26
Pts: J. Adams 15; Rebs: J. Adams 14; Asts: J. Adams 6		Pts: Torres 19; Rebs: Pagán 12; Asts: De Leon 8

Polideportivo Alexis Argüello, Managua
Attendance: 150
Referees: Aline García (URU), Mariajesus Rocio Gonzalez Chaparro (CHI), Carriera Lamoureux (CAN)

15 July 2026
14:30

Boxscore

Virgin Islands	87–71	Guyana
Scoring by quarter: 19–16, 25–17, 20–17, 23–21
Pts: Tate 18; Rebs: Kleemann-Day 9 Asts: Bough, Tate 6		Pts: J. Adams 18; Rebs: J. Adams 15; Asts: J. Adams 5

Polideportivo Alexis Argüello, Managua
Attendance: 120
Referees: Daniel Garcia (VEN), Sarah Rodriguez (HON), Elisha Lashawn Ullith Hodgson (NCA)

15 July 2026
17:00

Boxscore

El Salvador	34–99	Puerto Rico
Scoring by quarter: 11–33, 14–19, 2–28, 7–19
Pts: Avilés 7 Rebs: Vega 8 Asts: five players 2		Pts: Torres 13; Rebs: McGee-Stafford 14; Asts: De Leon 8

Polideportivo Alexis Argüello, Managua
Attendance: 210
Referees: Krishna Dominguez (MEX), Carlos Pallares (COL), Stevandrae Wells (BAH)

== Playoffs ==
=== Bracket ===
5th place game
Guyana	87
Nicaragua	92
7th place game
Bahamas	80
El Salvador	65

5th–8th place semifinals
B4	Guyana	66
A3	Bahamas	57
A4	Nicaragua	92
B3	El Salvador	75

Quarterfinals
B2	Virgin Islands	74
A3	Bahamas	59
A2	Dominican Republic	93
B3	El Salvador	60

Semifinals
A1	Mexico	65
B2	Virgin Islands	62
B1	Puerto Rico	90
A2	Dominican Republic	80

Final
Mexico	68
Puerto Rico	82
3rd place game
Virgin Islands	69
Dominican Republic	102

=== Quarterfinals ===
16 July 2026
17:30

Boxscore

Virgin Islands	74–59	Bahamas
Scoring by quarter: 20–13, 14–28, 23–10, 17–8
Pts: Tate 16; Rebs: George 9 Asts: Bough 8		Pts: Collins 20; Rebs: Collins 16; Asts: Nesbitt 4

Polideportivo Alexis Argüello, Managua
Attendance: 250
Referees: Orlando Varela (HON), Mariajesus Rocio Gonzalez Chaparro (CHI), Romina Belén Morales Ibarra (ARG)

16 July 2026
20:00

Boxscore

Dominican Republic	93–60	El Salvador
Scoring by quarter: 28–15, 24–12, 23–17, 18–16
Pts: Martinez 16; Rebs: Almon 8 Asts: Almon 5		Pts: Escobar 13; Rebs: Harvey-Carr 11; Asts: Escobar 5

Polideportivo Alexis Argüello, Managua
Attendance: 118
Referees: Daniel Garcia (VEN), Aline García (URU), Mirian Moraes (BRA)

=== 5th–8th place semifinals ===
17 July 2026
12:00

Boxscore

Guyana	66–57	Bahamas
Scoring by quarter: 12–13, 12–19, 25–12, 17–13
Pts: R. Adams 24; Rebs: J. Adams 17; Asts: three players 5		Pts: Collins 16; Rebs: Nesbitt 10; Asts: Nesbitt 8

Polideportivo Alexis Argüello, Managua
Attendance: 106
Referees: Franco Anselmo (ARG), Sarah Rodriguez (HON) Winker Mateo (DOM)

17 July 2026
14:30

Boxscore

Nicaragua	92–75	El Salvador
Scoring by quarter: 19–17, 19–22, 33–18, 21–18
Pts: McMiller 33; Rebs: McMiller 13; Asts: McMiller 7		Pts: Escobar, Harvey-Carr 18; Rebs: Harvey-Carr 12; Asts: Avilés, Escobar 3

Polideportivo Alexis Argüello, Managua
Attendance: 247
Referees: Krishna Dominguez (MEX), Carlos Pallares (COL), Carriera Lamoureux (CAN)

==== 7th place game ====
18 July 2026
12:00

Boxscore

El Salvador	65–80	Bahamas
Scoring by quarter: 20–20, 13–22, 11–14, 21–24
Pts: Harvey-Carr 27; Rebs: Harvey-Carr 9 Asts: Escobar 6		Pts: Moultrie 25; Rebs: Moultrie 11; Asts: Nesbitt 8

Polideportivo Alexis Argüello, Managua
Attendance: 5
Referees: Carlos Pallares (COL), Carriera Lamoureux (CAN), Elisha Lashawn Ullith Hodgson (NCA)

==== 5th place game ====
18 July 2026
14:30

Boxscore

Nicaragua	92–87 (OT)	Guyana
Scoring by quarter: 26–15, 14–15, 21–18, 17–30, Overtime: 14–9
Pts: McMiller 33; Rebs: Alvarez 13; Asts: Alvarez 7		Pts: Mc David 23; Rebs: J. Adams 22; Asts: J. Adams 8

Polideportivo Alexis Argüello, Managua
Attendance: 200
Referees: Krishna Dominguez (MEX), Sarah Rodriguez (HON), Stevandrae Wells (BAH)

=== Semifinals ===
17 July 2026
17:00

Boxscore

Puerto Rico	90–80	Dominican Republic
Scoring by quarter: 20–29, 29–17, 17–23, 24–11
Pts: McGee-Stafford 19; Rebs: McGee-Stafford 10; Asts: Rosado 11		Pts: Capellan 22; Rebs: Sosa 11; Asts: Jimenez, Martinez 4

Polideportivo Alexis Argüello, Managua
Attendance: 250
Referees: Daniel Garcia (VEN), Aline García (URU), Mariajesus Rocio Gonzalez Chaparro (CHI)

17 July 2026
19:30

Boxscore

Mexico	65–62	Virgin Islands
Scoring by quarter: 15–13, 23–18, 9–17, 18–14
Pts: Pitts 17; Rebs: Valenzuela 10; Asts: Jeffries 4		Pts: Kleemann-Day 20; Rebs: Ephraim 8 Asts: Tate 7

Polideportivo Alexis Argüello, Managua
Attendance: 300
Referees: Orlando Varela (HON), Romina Belén Morales Ibarra (ARG), Mirian Moraes (BRA)

==== 3rd place game ====
18 July 2026
17:00

Boxscore

Virgin Islands	69–102	Dominican Republic
Scoring by quarter: 12–29, 12–29, 23–27, 22–17
Pts: Tate 25; Rebs: Jones 6 Asts: Tate 5		Pts: Martinez 20; Rebs: Morton 6 Asts: Morton 6

Polideportivo Alexis Argüello, Managua
Attendance: 350
Referees: Daniel Garcia (VEN), Orlando Varela (HON), Franco Anselmo (ARG)

==== Final ====
18 July 2026
19:30

Boxscore

Mexico	68–82	Puerto Rico
Scoring by quarter: 19–14, 11–26, 18–24, 20–18
Pts: Esquer 15; Rebs: Jeffries 6 Asts: Jeffries 5		Pts: Benitez, Gonzalez 20; Rebs: McGee-Stafford 10; Asts: Rosado 5

Polideportivo Alexis Argüello, Managua
Attendance: 400
Referees: Aline García (URU), Romina Belén Morales Ibarra (ARG), Mariajesus Rocio Gonzalez Chaparro (CHI)

== Final standings ==
Pos	Team	Pld	W	L	PF	PA	PD	Pts	Qualification
1st place, gold medalist(s)	Puerto Rico	5	5	0	445	307	+138	10	Qualified for the 2027 FIBA Women's AmeriCup
2nd place, silver medalist(s)	Mexico	5	4	1	392	341	+51	9	Qualified for the 2027 FIBA Women's AmeriCup
3rd place, bronze medalist(s)	Dominican Republic	6	4	2	501	417	+84	10	Qualified for the 2027 FIBA Women's AmeriCup
4	Virgin Islands	6	3	3	451	425	+26	9	
5	Nicaragua	5	2	3	371	428	−57	7	
6	Guyana	5	1	4	358	414	−56	6	
7	Bahamas	6	2	4	405	425	−20	8	
8	El Salvador	6	1	5	366	532	−166	7	Qualified for the 2027 FIBA Women's AmeriCup as hosts

Source: FIBA

== Awards ==
2026 Centrobasket Women

Puerto Rico
Sixth title

Team roster: Franchesca Torres, Tayra Melendez, Brianna Jones, Nina De Leon, Abeliz Rodriguez Santiago, Pamela Rosado, Zaida Gonzalez, Sofia Roma, Denise Solis, India Pagán, Imani McGee-Stafford, Jacqueline Benítez.
Head Coach: Gerardo Batista

=== Player awards ===
All-Tournament Team
(Puerto Rico) Imani McGee-Stafford
(Mexico) Mariana Valenzuela
(Dominican Republic) Cesarina Capellán
(United States Virgin Islands) Anisha George
(Nicaragua) Kiyomi McMiller
MVP
(Puerto Rico) Imani McGee-Stafford

=== Notable statistics ===
- Highest attended game: 1,600 (Bahamas 73–67 Nicaragua, 13 July)
- Lowest attended game: 5 (El Salvador 65–80 Bahamas, 18 July)
- Most points in a game: 179 (Nicaragua 92–87 Guyana, 18 July)
- Fewest points in a game: 123 (Guyana 66–57 Bahamas, 17 July)
- Most points by a team in a game: 102 (Virgin Islands 69–102 Dominican Republic, 18 July)
- Fewest points by a team in a game: 34 (El Salvador 34–99 Puerto Rico, 15 July)
- Biggest points difference in a game: 65 (El Salvador 34–99 Puerto Rico, 15 July)
- Biggest half time deficit in a game: 34 (Virgin Islands 24–58 Dominican Republic, 18 July)
- Most points scored by a player in a game: 36 (Kiyomi McMiller vs Mexico, 12 July)

Reference
Gameday 1
Gameday 2
Gameday 3
Gameday 4
Gameday 5
Gameday 6
Gameday 7
