= 2018 FIBA Women's Caribbean Championship =

23rd FIBA Women's Caribbean Basketball Championship

Tournament details
- Host country: Suriname
- City: Paramaribo
- Dates: 17–21 June 2018
- Teams: 7 (from 1 sub-confederation)
- Venue: 1 (in 1 host city)

Final positions
- Champions: Cuba (3rd title)
- Runners-up: Dominican Republic
- Third place: Bahamas

Official website
- www.fiba.basketball/history

The 2018 FIBA Women's Caribbean Championship was the 23rd edition of the Caribbean basketball championship for women's national teams. The tournament was played at the Anthony Nesty Sporthal in Paramaribo, Suriname, from 17 to 21 June 2018.

This tournament also served as a qualification for the 2018 Centrobasket Women, where the top three teams qualified.

== Participating teams ==
- Bahamas
- Barbados
- Cuba
- Dominican Republic
- Guyana
- Saint Vincent and the Grenadines
- Suriname

== Format ==
The tournament consisted of two stages. In the group stage, the teams were drawn into two groups, which were played in a round-robin format. The top two teams from each group advanced to the semifinals; the third-placed teams advanced to the 5th place match; the fourth team from Group B finished 7th overall.

All times are local (Suriname Time; UTC-3).

== Group stage ==
=== Group A ===
Pos	Team	Pld	W	L	PF	PA	PD	Pts	Qualification
1	Cuba	2	2	0	185	82	+103	4	Semifinals
2	Bahamas	2	1	1	125	127	−2	3	Semifinals
3	Saint Vincent and the Grenadines	2	0	2	82	183	−101	2	5th place match

Source: FIBA

17 June 2018
16:30

Boxscore

Cuba	77–50	Bahamas
Scoring by quarter: 27–9, 12–14, 20–18, 18–9

Anthony Nesty Sporthal, Paramaribo

18 June 2018
16:30

Boxscore

Bahamas	75–50	Saint Vincent and the Grenadines
Scoring by quarter: 13–9, 24–14, 16–19, 22–8

Anthony Nesty Sporthal, Paramaribo

19 June 2018
16:30

Boxscore

Saint Vincent and the Grenadines	32–108	Cuba
Scoring by quarter: 6–29, 2–29, 9–28, 15–22

Anthony Nesty Sporthal, Paramaribo

=== Group B ===
Pos	Team	Pld	W	L	PF	PA	PD	Pts	Qualification
1	Dominican Republic	3	3	0	295	106	+189	6	Semifinals
2	Barbados	3	2	1	185	187	−2	5	Semifinals
3	Suriname (H)	3	1	2	177	215	−38	4	5th place match
4	Guyana	3	0	3	115	264	−149	3	

Source: FIBA
(H) Hosts

17 June 2018
18:45

Boxscore

Guyana	39–79	Barbados
Scoring by quarter: –, –, –, –

Anthony Nesty Sporthal, Paramaribo

17 June 2018
21:00

Boxscore

Suriname	49–90	Dominican Republic
Scoring by quarter: 12–23, 5–23, 19–25, 13–19

Anthony Nesty Sporthal, Paramaribo

18 June 2018
18:45

Boxscore

Dominican Republic	93–33	Barbados
Scoring by quarter: 27–11, 23–7, 27–12, 16–3

Anthony Nesty Sporthal, Paramaribo

18 June 2018
21:00

Boxscore

Guyana	52–73	Suriname
Scoring by quarter: 16–22, 11–4, 15–25, 10–22

Anthony Nesty Sporthal, Paramaribo

19 June 2018
18:45

Boxscore

Guyana	24–112	Dominican Republic
Scoring by quarter: –, –, –, –

Anthony Nesty Sporthal, Paramaribo

19 June 2018
21:00

Boxscore

Suriname	55–73	Barbados
Scoring by quarter: –, –, –, –

Anthony Nesty Sporthal, Paramaribo

== Playoffs ==
=== Bracket ===
Semifinals
B1	Dominican Republic	56
A2	Bahamas	41
B2	Barbados	41
A1	Cuba	106

Final
Dominican Republic	55
Cuba	66
3rd place match
Bahamas	65
Barbados	56

5th place match
B3	Suriname	51
A3	Saint Vincent and the Grenadines	63

=== Semifinals ===
20 June 2018
18:45

Boxscore

Barbados	41–106	Cuba
Scoring by quarter: 12–25, 12–23, 10–36, 7–22

Anthony Nesty Sporthal, Paramaribo

20 June 2018
21:00

Boxscore

Dominican Republic	56–41	Bahamas
Scoring by quarter: 15–7, 11–8, 18–10, 12–16

Anthony Nesty Sporthal, Paramaribo

=== 5th place match ===
20 June 2018
16:30

Boxscore

Suriname	51–63	Saint Vincent and the Grenadines
Scoring by quarter: 15–17, 11–20, 15–13, 10–13

Anthony Nesty Sporthal, Paramaribo

=== 3rd place match ===
21 June 2018
18:45

Boxscore

Bahamas	65–56	Barbados
Scoring by quarter: 18–11, 15–14, 13–15, 19–16

Anthony Nesty Sporthal, Paramaribo

=== Final ===
21 June 2018
21:00

Boxscore

Dominican Republic	55–66	Cuba
Scoring by quarter: 6–19, 21–19, 15–9, 13–19

Anthony Nesty Sporthal, Paramaribo

== Final standings ==
Rank	Team	Record
1st place, gold medalist(s)	Cuba	4–0
2nd place, silver medalist(s)	Dominican Republic	4–1
3rd place, bronze medalist(s)	Bahamas	2–2
4	Barbados	2–3
5	Saint Vincent and the Grenadines	1–2
6	Suriname	1–3
7	Guyana	0–3

Qualified for the 2018 Centrobasket Women
