= 2022 FIBA Women's Caribbean Championship =

24th FIBA Women's Caribbean Basketball Championship

Tournament details
- Host country: Cuba
- City: Havana
- Dates: 13–17 July 2022
- Teams: 4 (from 1 sub-confederation)
- Venue: 1 (in 1 host city)

Final positions
- Champions: Cuba (4th title)
- Runners-up: Dominican Republic
- Third place: Bahamas

Official website
- www.fiba.basketball/history

The 2022 FIBA Women's Caribbean Championship was the 24th edition of the Caribbean basketball championship for women's national teams. The tournament was played at the Coliseo de la Ciudad Deportiva in Havana, Cuba, from 13 to 17 July 2022.

This tournament also served as a qualification for the 2022 Centrobasket Women, where the top two teams qualified.

== Participating teams ==
- Bahamas
- Cuba
- Dominican Republic
- Jamaica

== Format ==
In the group phase, the all four participating teams played round-robin in one group. All teams advanced to the semifinals, which were played using the 1st vs 4th and 2nd vs 3rd system.

All times are local (Eastern Daylight Time; UTC-4).

== Group phase ==
Pos	Team	Pld	W	L	PF	PA	PD	Pts
1	Cuba (H)	3	3	0	237	127	+110	6
2	Dominican Republic	3	2	1	222	172	+50	5
3	Bahamas	3	1	2	168	202	−34	4
4	Jamaica	3	0	3	131	257	−126	3

Source: FIBA
Rules for classification: 1) Points; 2) Head-to-head results; 3) Points difference; 4) Points scored.
(H) Hosts

13 July 2022
15:30

Boxscore

Dominican Republic	98–46	Jamaica
Scoring by quarter: 19–8, 26–9, 20–11, 33–18

Coliseo de la Ciudad Deportiva, Havana

13 July 2022
18:30

Boxscore

Cuba	76–44	Bahamas
Scoring by quarter: 20–8, 18–14, 14–16, 24–6

Coliseo de la Ciudad Deportiva, Havana

14 July 2022
15:30

Boxscore

Bahamas	50–73	Dominican Republic
Scoring by quarter: 11–16, 10–20, 8–22, 21–15

Coliseo de la Ciudad Deportiva, Havana

14 July 2022
18:30

Boxscore

Jamaica	32–85	Cuba
Scoring by quarter: 9–25, 8–18, 6–17, 9–25

Coliseo de la Ciudad Deportiva, Havana

15 July 2022
15:30

Boxscore

Jamaica	53–74	Bahamas
Scoring by quarter: 10–21, 19–15, 15–23, 9–15

Coliseo de la Ciudad Deportiva, Havana

15 July 2022
18:30

Boxscore

Cuba	76–51	Dominican Republic
Scoring by quarter: 20–19, 20–12, 19–10, 17–10

Coliseo de la Ciudad Deportiva, Havana

== Playoffs ==
=== Bracket ===
Semifinals
1	Cuba	97
4	Jamaica	36
2	Dominican Republic	81
3	Bahamas	58

Final
Cuba	79
Dominican Republic	60
Third place match
Jamaica	57
Bahamas	68

=== Semifinals ===
16 July 2022
15:30

Boxscore

Dominican Republic	81–58	Bahamas
Scoring by quarter: 16–14, 15–13, 24–16, 26–15

Coliseo de la Ciudad Deportiva, Havana

16 July 2022
18:30

Boxscore

Cuba	97–36	Jamaica
Scoring by quarter: 22–11, 20–13, 32–4, 23–8

Coliseo de la Ciudad Deportiva, Havana

=== Third place match ===
17 July 2022
15:30

Boxscore

Jamaica	57–68	Bahamas
Scoring by quarter: 14–18, 15–14, 9–18, 19–18

Coliseo de la Ciudad Deportiva, Havana

=== Final ===
17 July 2022
18:30

Boxscore

Cuba	79–60	Dominican Republic
Scoring by quarter: 23–21, 24–11, 21–14, 11–14

Coliseo de la Ciudad Deportiva, Havana

== Final standings ==
Rank	Team	Record
1st place, gold medalist(s)	Cuba	4–0
2nd place, silver medalist(s)	Dominican Republic	2–2
3rd place, bronze medalist(s)	Bahamas	2–2
4	Jamaica	0–4

Qualified for the 2022 Centrobasket Women
