= Oberon Pitterson =

Jamaica basketball and netball international, netball head coach

Personal information
- Full name: Oberon Jean Pitterson-Nattie
- Born: 8 February 1971 (age 55)
- Height: 1.81 m (5 ft 11 in)

Netball career
- Playing positions: GK, GD, WD
Years	Club team	Apps
200x–2009	Waulgrovians	
2005	University of the West Indies	
2010–2012	Tivoli Gardens	
2004–2013	General Accident	
Years	National team	Caps
1988–2006	Jamaica	120+
Coaching career
- Years: Team
- 2011–2014: Jamaica
- 2016–2018: Grenada
Medal record
Representing Jamaica
World Netball Championships
Bronze medal – third place	1991 Sydney	Team
Bronze medal – third place	2003 Kingston	Team
Commonwealth Games
Bronze medal – third place	2002 Manchester	Team
World Games
Bronze medal – third place	1993 The Hague	Team

Oberon Pitterson (born 8 February 1971), also known as Oberon Pitterson-Dunn or Oberon Pitterson-Nattie, is a Jamaican sportswomen who represented Jamaica at both netball and basketball. As a netball player she was a member of the Jamaica teams that were bronze medallists at the 1991 and 2003 World Netball Championships. She also won a bronze medal with Jamaica at the 1993 World Games. Pitterson captained Jamaica at the 2002 Commonwealth Games and 2003 World Netball Championships. Between 2011 and 2014, she also served as the Jamaica national netball team head coach, including at the 2011 World Netball Championships. Between 1993 and 1995, Pitterson played college basketball for Western Illinois Leathernecks. In the 1996–97 season, she played basketball for Tampereen Pyrintö in Finland's Naisten Korisliiga and between 2006 and 2010, Pitterson played for the Jamaica women's national basketball team.

== Netball ==
=== Playing career ===
==== Waulgrovians ====
Pitterson played club netball for Waulgrovians from the 1990s until 2009.

==== University of the West Indies ====
In 2005, Pitterson represented the University of the West Indies netball team that placed second in the an intercollegiate competition.

==== Tivoli Gardens ====
Between 2010 and 2012, Pitterson played club netball Tivoli Gardens.

==== General Accident ====
Between 2004 and 2013, Pitterson played for General Accident in the Business House Senior League, serving as both a player and player/coach. Pitterson was a long time employee at General Accident. Her teammates and colleagues at the insurance company included fellow Jamaica netball international, Nadine Bryan. Pitterson helped General Accident win several league titles, including in 2004, 2007, 2008 and 2012.

==== Jamaica ====
Between 1991 and 2003, Pitterson played for Jamaica at four World Netball Championships. She was a member of the Jamaica teams that were bronze medallists at the 1991 and 2003 World Netball Championships. She also won a bronze medal with Jamaica at the 1993 World Games. She also represented Jamaica at the 1998 Commonwealth Games. Pitterson captained Jamaica at the 2002 Commonwealth Games and 2003 World Netball Championships.

Tournaments	Place
1991 World Netball Championships	3rd place, bronze medalist(s)
1993 World Games	3rd place, bronze medalist(s)
1995 World Netball Championships	5th
1998 Commonwealth Games	5th
1999 World Netball Championships	4th
2002 Commonwealth Games	3rd place, bronze medalist(s)
2003 World Netball Championships	3rd place, bronze medalist(s)
2006 Commonwealth Games	4th

=== Coaching career ===
==== Jamaica ====
Between 2011 and 2014 Pitterson served as head coach of Jamaica. She coached Jamaica at the 2011 World Netball Championships. She was also coach of the Jamaica under-21 team that were bronze medallists at the 2013 World Youth Netball Championships.

==== Grenada ====
In 2016 and 2017, Pitterson served as a coaching consultant/technical director with Grenada, helping them prepare for the 2016 Netball Europe Open Challenge and 2017 Netball World Youth Cup. She coached Grenada the 2018 AFNA Championships.

Tournaments	Place	Team
2011 World Netball Championships	4th	Jamaica
2011 World Netball Series	4th	Jamaica
2012 AFNA Championships	1st	Jamaica
2012 Fast5 Netball World Series	4th	Jamaica
2013 World Youth Netball Championships	3rd place, bronze medalist(s)	Jamaica
2013 Fast5 Netball World Series	3rd	Jamaica
2016 Netball Europe Open Challenge	1st	Grenada
2017 Netball World Youth Cup	20th	Grenada
2018 AFNA Championships	3rd	Grenada

== Basketball ==
Oberon Pitterson
Jamaica
- Position: Forward

Personal information
- Born: 8 February 1971 (age 55)
- Listed height: 1.81 m (5 ft 11 in)

Career information
- College: Western Illinois University

Career history
- 1993–1995: Western Illinois Leathernecks
- 1996–1997: Tampereen Pyrintö
- 2006: University of the West Indies
- 2007–2014: Waulgrovians Bullets
- 2006–2010: Jamaica
Medals
Representing Jamaica
FIBA Caribbean Championship
Gold medal – first place	2006 Kingston
Centrobasket
Silver medal – second place	2010 Mayaguez
Centrobasket
Bronze medal – third place	2006 Mexico City

=== Playing career ===
==== Western Illinois Leathernecks ====
Between 1993 and 1995, Pitterson played college basketball for Western Illinois Leathernecks. She made 56 appearances for Leathernecks and was a member of their team that won the 1994–95 Summit League women's basketball tournament. She was also named the 1994–95 Summit Tournament MVP.

==== Tampereen Pyrintö ====
During the 1996–97 season, Pitterson played for Tampereen Pyrintö in Finland's Naisten Korisliiga. On 12 October 1996, in a game against Äänekosken Huima, Pitterson recorded 32 rebounds, a performance that ranks among the highest in the history of the Naisten Korisliiga. During the same match, she achieved an efficiency rating of 67. She totalled 629 points and 476 rebounds over 29 games, averaging approximately 21.7 points and 16.4 rebounds per game.

==== University of the West Indies ====
In 2005, Pitterson played for the University of the West Indies basketball team that won an intercollegiate championship.

==== Waulgrovians Bullets ====
Between 2007 and 2016, Pitterson played for Waulgrovian Bullets in the Jamaica Basketball Association's National Women Super League. She helped Bullets win championships in 2007 and 2016.

==== Jamaica ====
Between 2006 and 2010, Pitterson played for Jamaica. She was a member of the Jamaica team that were gold medallists at the 2006 CBC Championship. She captained the Jamaica team at the 2006 Centrobasket Women.

Tournaments	Place
2006 CBC Championship	1st place, gold medalist(s)
2006 Central American and Caribbean Games	
2006 Centrobasket Women	3rd place, bronze medalist(s)
2007 Pan American Games	8th
2007 FIBA Americas Championship for Women	8th
2010 Centrobasket Women	2nd place, silver medalist(s)

== Personnel life ==
Pitterson was married to Marland Nattie, a prominent figure in Jamaican and Caribbean basketball. He was a former player, coach and administrator. Between 1997 and 2008 Nattie served as president of the Jamaica Basketball Association. In October 2023, Nattie passed away. He had suffered a severe stroke two months earlier. Pitterson subsequently organised and hosted the Marland Nattie Legends 3x3 basketball tournament in his honour.

== Honours ==
=== Netball ===
==== Coaching career ====
Jamaica

- AFNA Championships
  - Winners: 2012

=== Basketball ===
==== Playing career ====
Jamaica

- CBC Championship
  - Winners: 2006
- Centrobasket Women
  - Runners Up: 2010

Western Illinois Leathernecks

- Summit League women's basketball tournament
  - Winners: 1994–95
