= 2017 Centrobasket Women =

2017 FIBA Women's Centrobasket
20th Women's Central American and Caribbean Basketball Championship

Tournament details
- Host country: United States Virgin Islands
- City: St. Thomas
- Dates: 12–16 July 2017
- Teams: 6 (from 1 confederation)
- Venue: 1 (in 1 host city)

Final positions
- Champions: Virgin Islands (1st title)

Tournament statistics
- MVP: (United States Virgin Islands) Natalie Day
- Top scorer: (United States Virgin Islands) Day (18.6)
- Top rebounds: (United States Virgin Islands) Day (11.0)
- Top assists: (United States Virgin Islands) Bough (6.6)
- PPG (Team): Puerto Rico (72.8)
- RPG (Team): Virgin Islands (46.6)
- APG (Team): Mexico (18.2)

Official website
- www.fiba.basketball

The 2017 Women's Centrobasket Championship was the 20th edition of women's Central American and Caribbean basketball championship. The tournament was held in the city of Saint Thomas, U.S. Virgin Islands from 12 to 16 July 2017.

== Final standings ==
Pos	Team	Pld	W	L	PF	PA	PD	Pts	Qualification
1	Virgin Islands	5	4	1	326	269	+57	9 (Note: U.S. Virgin Islands 1–1, +6; Mexico 1–1, -2; Puerto Rico 1–1, -4)	2017 FIBA Women's AmeriCup
2	Mexico	5	4	1	315	264	+51	9	2017 FIBA Women's AmeriCup
3	Puerto Rico	5	4	1	364	263	+101	9	2017 FIBA Women's AmeriCup
4	Jamaica	5	2	3	257	320	−63	7	
5	Bahamas	5	1	4	270	322	−52	6	
6	Guatemala	5	0	5	270	364	−94	5	

Source: FIBA

== Match results ==
All times are local (Atlantic Standard Time – UTC-4).

12 July 2017
15:00

Boxscore

Mexico	61–56	Bahamas
Scoring by quarter: 23–10, 9–14, 16–17, 13–15

St. Thomas

12 July 2017
17:15

Boxscore

Puerto Rico	90–44	Jamaica
Scoring by quarter: 21–12, 26–15, 17–9, 26–8

St. Thomas

12 July 2017
19:30

Boxscore

Guatemala	58–82	Virgin Islands
Scoring by quarter: 18–22, 13–17, 15–19, 12–24

St. Thomas

13 July 2017
15:00

Boxscore

Bahamas	48–64	Jamaica
Scoring by quarter: 15–16, 12–15, 8–16, 13–17

St. Thomas

13 July 2017
17:15

Boxscore

Guatemala	55–87	Puerto Rico
Scoring by quarter: 12–19, 14–20, 13–30, 16–18

St. Thomas

13 July 2017
19:30

Boxscore

Virgin Islands	63–55	Mexico
Scoring by quarter: 20–12, 16–19, 14–11, 13–13

St. Thomas

14 July 2017
15:00

Boxscore

Jamaica	66–48	Guatemala
Scoring by quarter: 17–14, 14–14, 20–6, 15–14

St. Thomas

14 July 2017
17:15

Boxscore

Puerto Rico	58–64	Mexico
Scoring by quarter: 16–15, 15–12, 9–16, 18–21

St. Thomas

14 July 2017
19:30

Boxscore

Virgin Islands	63–56	Bahamas
Scoring by quarter: 24–12, 15–16, 11–10, 13–18

St. Thomas

15 July 2017
15:00

Boxscore

Guatemala	44–61	Mexico
Scoring by quarter: 19–11, 4–21, 13–15, 8–14

St. Thomas

15 July 2017
17:15

Boxscore

Puerto Rico	69–42	Bahamas
Scoring by quarter: 19–6, 13–13, 9–17, 28–6

St. Thomas

15 July 2017
19:30

Boxscore

Jamaica	40–60	Virgin Islands
Scoring by quarter: 11–15, 5–14, 8–17, 16–14

St. Thomas

16 July 2017
15:00

Boxscore

Bahamas	68–65	Guatemala
Scoring by quarter: 17–8, 8–16, 17–22, 26–19

St. Thomas

16 July 2017
17:15

Boxscore

Jamaica	43–74	Mexico
Scoring by quarter: 10–23, 13–17, 11–19, 9–15

St. Thomas

16 July 2017
19:30

Boxscore

Virgin Islands	58–60	Puerto Rico
Scoring by quarter: 15–14, 16–12, 14–11, 13–23

St. Thomas
