= Basketball in Guyana =

Basketball in Guyana is a top sport in Guyana.

Its national teams have won several medals at the FIBA CBC Championship. Georgetown, Guyana hosted the event several times.

Guyana has two basketball leagues.

== GABA DIV 1 ==
- Pacesetters
- Ravens
- Nets
- Colts
- Scorpions
- Sonics
- Maccabees
- Legends
- Disciples
- Eagles

== LABA DIV 1 ==
- Kings
- Raiders
- Pistons
- Royals
- Bulls
- Jets
- Scheme Unit
- Panthers
- Patriots

== See also ==
- Guyana men's national basketball team
- Guyana women's national basketball team
