= Wellesley College Senate bus =

Shuttle bus in Massachusetts

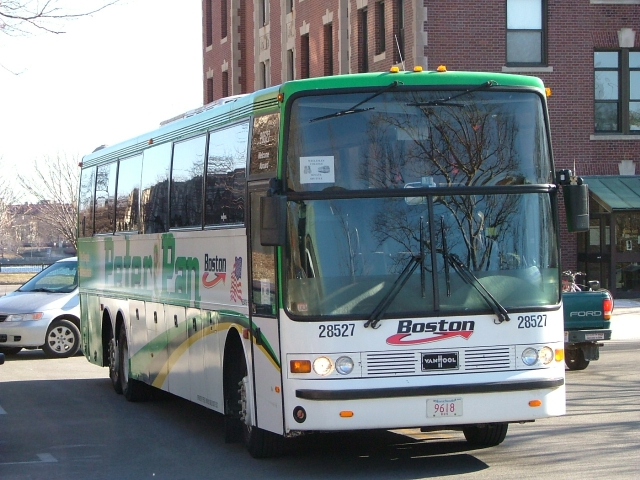
The Senate bus

The Wellesley College Senate bus is a shuttle bus service that connects Wellesley College to the Massachusetts Institute of Technology and Harvard University.

== History ==
Until November 1966, transportation at Wellesley consisted of a shuttle to the Woodland MBTA Green Line stop in the nearby city of Newton. At this point, college president Ruth Adams approved expansion of the transportation system and the Senate bus began operations. The shuttle service was originally named for the Wellesley College Student Government Senate, which lobbied in favor of such a route. Author Susan Orlean noted that the weekend bus was viewed by some students as a sign of liberation, in that there was a time earlier in that century when students were confined to campus on weekends unless they had a note from home.

== Service ==
The Senate bus is operated by the Wellesley College Department of Housing and Transportation, running Friday through Sunday every week. After leaving Wellesley, stops are made at Harvard Square, MIT's Kresge Auditorium, and Commonwealth Avenue in Boston.

The service is not to be confused with the "exchange bus", which transfers employees, faculty, and cross-registered students between MIT and Wellesley during the week.

== Media coverage as the "Fuck Truck" ==
Students at MIT, Harvard, and Wellesley have sometimes referred to the shuttle service as the "Fuck Truck". The term gained national notoriety when it was mentioned in a 2001 Rolling Stone article entitled "The Highly Charged Erotic Life of the Wellesley Girl", which also discussed the supposed sexual eagerness of Wellesley students. This article and other media attention given to the bus and Wellesley's party scene in general caused concern among the college's administration.

A 1995 Boston Herald article also discussed the Senate Bus in terms that many Wellesley students found sensationalistic. An article in Counterpoint magazine criticized both the Herald article and the Wellesley student government response to it:

"In actuality, the bus is the only affordable means of transportation into the Boston area for many Wellesley students during the weekends. Many women riding the Senate Bus have more critical concerns than Saturday evening socializing."

At least one survey suggests that the sexually promiscuous image of Wellesley students that these articles put forth may be exaggerated. In its November 2001 sex survey, Counterpoint reported that 14% of Wellesley students who had had sex claimed to have engaged in sex with an MIT student, and 19% of MIT students who had had sex claimed to have engaged in sex with a Wellesley student. It also reported that 60% of Wellesley students were virgins, as were 47% of MIT students; in addition, 31% of Wellesley students and 43% of MIT students reported having had sex while in college.

An article discussing the bus and its role in Wellesley's social life appeared in the February 22, 2006 issue of The Harvard Crimson. This article referred to the bus as the "Cuddle Shuttle" and "Fuck Truck" and did not use the shuttle's official name.
