= Vashil Fernandez =

Jamaican professional basketball player

Personal information
- Born: January 16, 1992 (age 34) Kingston, Jamaica
- Listed height: 6 ft 11 in (2.11 m)
- Listed weight: 255 lb (116 kg)

Career information
- High school: Calabar (Kingston, Jamaica); Princeton Day Academy (Lanham, Maryland)
- College: Valparaiso (2012–2016)
- NBA draft: 2016: undrafted
- Playing career: 2016–2019
- Position: Center

Career history
- 2016–2017: Sioux Falls Skyforce
- 2017: Greensboro Swarm
- 2017: Phoenix Galați
- 2017–2018: Peñas Huesca
- 2018–2019: Marín Peixegalego

Career highlights
- NCAA blocks leader (2016); Lefty Driesell Award (2016); 2× Horizon League Defensive Player of the Year (2015, 2016); 2× Horizon League All-Defensive Team (2015, 2016)
- Stats at Basketball Reference

Vashil Fernandez (born January 16, 1992) is a Jamaican former professional basketball player who plays for Marín Ence PeixeGalego of the Spanish LEB Oro. He played college basketball for Valparaiso.

== Early life ==
Fernandez grew up outside of Kingston, Jamaica in a house with 19 people. He never knew his father and his mother commuted to the city for work. He played soccer and ran track, but didn't start playing basketball until he was 17. Fernandez recalls being terrible at first and travelling a lot. For high school, he moved to the United States and ended up at Princeton Day Academy in Maryland. After visiting Valparaiso, he committed to play for the Crusaders.

== College career ==
Fernandez was declared ineligible as a freshman and sat out his first year of college. In 2014–15, he was named the Horizon League Defensive Player of the Year and averaged 6.9 points, 5.9 rebounds and 2.9 blocks per game. Following the season, the NCAA granted him an extra year of eligibility. As a senior, he led the NCAA in blocks with a 3.31 per game average and won the Lefty Driesell Award for his overall defensive efforts. He is also the all-time blocks leader at Valparaiso.

== Professional career ==
After going undrafted in the 2016 NBA draft, Fernandez signed with the Miami Heat on October 17, 2016. However, he was later waived by the Heat on October 22 after appearing in two preseason games. On November 1, 2016, he was acquired by the Sioux Falls Skyforce of the NBA Development League as an affiliate player of the Heat. On February 24, 2017, Fernandez was waived by the Skyforce. On March 17, 2017, Fernandez was acquired by the Greensboro Swarm.

On August 24, he signed with Phoenix Galați of the Romanian league for the 2017–18 season. In December 2017 Fernandez signed with Peñas Huesca due to the departure of Matt O'Leary.

At the start of the 2018–2019 season, he signed with Marín Peixegalego, who played in the LEB Plata league.

== National team career ==
Fernandez has been a member of the Jamaican national basketball team and participated at the 2014 Centrobasket.

== Personal life ==
Fernandez married Bridget Eichner in May 2015 and has two daughters, Maia and Olivia. He earned two master's degrees from Valparaiso, in international economics and finance and international commerce and policy.
