= Saint Kitts and Nevis men's national basketball team =

Saint Kitts and Nevis
- FIBA ranking: NR (2 December 2025)
- Joined FIBA: 1979
- FIBA zone: FIBA Americas

FIBA AmeriCup
- Appearances: None

Caribbean Championship
- Appearances: 2 (2000, 2006)
- Medals: None

The Saint Kitts and Nevis national basketball team is the national men's basketball team from Saint Kitts and Nevis, governed by the St. Kitts Amateur Basketball Association.

== Current roster ==
At the 2006 FIBA CBC Championship:

St. Kitts men's national basketball team roster
Players
Coaches

Pos.	No.	Name	Age – Date of birth	Height	Club	Ctr.
	4	Geargeo Gaton	27 – 6 July 1978
	5	Tamboro Kotania Caines	26 – 13 April 1980
	6	Trevor Edison Huggins	41 – 16 April 1965
	7	Marvin Everton Davis	22 – 5 October 1983
	8	Lavi Fyfield	25 – 17 November 1980
	9	Dwyane Elroy MC Sheene	21 – 7 August 1984
	10	Brian Alexis Morris	32 – 2 January 1974
	11	Lyle Duggins	33 – 27 March 1973
	12	William Gerald Natta	19 – 15 January 1987
	13	Nashorn Jerome Maynard	19 – 17 June 1986
	14	Trevor Stevens	32 – 4 March 1974
	15	Kemo Duncan	23 – 16 May 1983

Head coach

Assistant coaches

Legend

- Club – describes last
  club before the tournament
- Age – describes age
  on 13 June 2006
