= Jamaica men's national basketball team =

Jamaica
- FIBA ranking: 79 ▲8 (3 March 2026)
- Joined FIBA: 1962
- FIBA zone: FIBA Americas
- National federation: Jamaica Basketball Association
- Coach: Rick Turner
- Nickname: JAMROCKERZ

Olympic Games
- Appearances: None

FIBA World Cup
- Appearances: None

FIBA AmeriCup
- Appearances: 1 (2013)
- Medals: None

Caribbean Championship
- Appearances: 9
- Medals: (4): 1981, 1996, 2006, 2009 (1): 2003
Home	Away

Jamaica national basketball team is governed by the Jamaica Basketball Association.

The team had its best performance at the 2013 FIBA Americas Championship where it beat the two former world champions Brazil and Argentina.

== Outlook ==
The team finished in seventh place in the 2006 Centrobasket with a 1–4 record. The lone victory was a 100–57 win over Costa Rica. In the 2010 Centrobasket, led by Roy Hibbert, they finished in fifth place with a record of 2–2. The 2012 Centrobasket saw them win their first medal (bronze).

== Rosters ==
=== Current roster ===
Jamaica roster
Players
Coaches

Pos.	No.	Name	Age – Date of birth	Height	Club	Ctr.
G	1	Prince Foster	30 – 12 November 1994	1.94 m (6 ft 4 in)	AB Contern	(Luxembourg)
G	2	Jalen Menzies	24 – 25 November 2000	1.78 m (5 ft 10 in)	Humber Polytechnic	(Canada)
G	3	Micah Imani-Swayne	21 – 28 November 2003	1.88 m (6 ft 2 in)	University of the West Indies	(Jamaica)
G	5	Marcus McDonald	18 – 14 February 2007	1.90 m (6 ft 3 in)	Overtime Elite	(United States)
F	7	Giovanni Fraser	27 – 7 February 1998	2.01 m (6 ft 7 in)	University of East London	(United Kingdom)
F	10	Jordan Kellier	26 – 20 November 1998	1.96 m (6 ft 5 in)	Cultural y Deportiva Leonesa	(Spain)
F	12	Kentan Facey	32 – 14 July 1993	2.06 m (6 ft 9 in)	Caen Basket Calvados	(France)
F	15	Romaine Thomas	31 – 10 December 1993	2.03 m (6 ft 8 in)	Sorges Avignon	(France)
F	21	Justin Abson	21 – 31 October 2003	2.08 m (6 ft 10 in)	Georgia Bulldogs	(United States)
F	23	Seyi Riley	25 – 12 December 1999	1.96 m (6 ft 5 in)	KK Perlas Vilkaviškis	(Lithuania)
G	24	Norman Powell	32 – 25 May 1993	1.93 m (6 ft 4 in)	Miami Heat	(United States)
C	35	Romaro Gill	30 – 2 October 1994	2.21 m (7 ft 3 in)	Río Ourense Termal	(Spain)

Head coach

- (United States) Rick Turner

Assistant coach(es)

Legend

- Club – describes last
  club before the competition
- Age – describes age
  on 8 August 2025

== Results ==
=== Summer Olympics ===
yet to qualify

=== FIBA World Cup ===
yet to qualify

=== FIBA AmeriCup ===
Year	Position	Tournament	Host
2013	8	2013 FIBA Americas Championship	Caracas, Venezuela
2017	Did not qualify	2017 FIBA AmeriCup	Argentina, Colombia, Uruguay

=== Other tournaments ===
Season: 2010 (CAC Games)

Event	Season	Date	Against	Result
CAC Games	2010	30 July 2010	Panama	83–64
CAC Games	2010	29 July 2010	British Virgin Islands	75–68 OT
CAC Games	2010	27 July 2010	Mexico	77–79
CAC Games	2010	26 July 2010	Puerto Rico	71–104

Season: 2010 (Centrobasket)

Event	Season	Date	Against	Result
Centrobasket	2010	10 July 2010	Panama	51–55
Centrobasket	2010	9 July 2010	U.S. Virgin Islands	71–65
Centrobasket	2010	8 July 2010	British Virgin Islands	71–56
Centrobasket	2010	6 July 2010	Dominican Republic	62–68

== Notable players ==
- Wayne Sappleton (first Jamaican born player to be drafted, and to play in the NBA).
- Patrick Ewing (first Jamaican born player to be drafted 1/1, 11x All-Star, 1x All-NBA first team, 1985–86 NBA Rookie of the Year, 2x Olympic Gold Medalist in 1984 and 1992, and Basketball Hall of Fame inductee).
- Rumeal Robinson
- Roy Hibbert (runner-up for 2013–14 NBA Defensive Player of the Year Award).
- Jerome Jordan

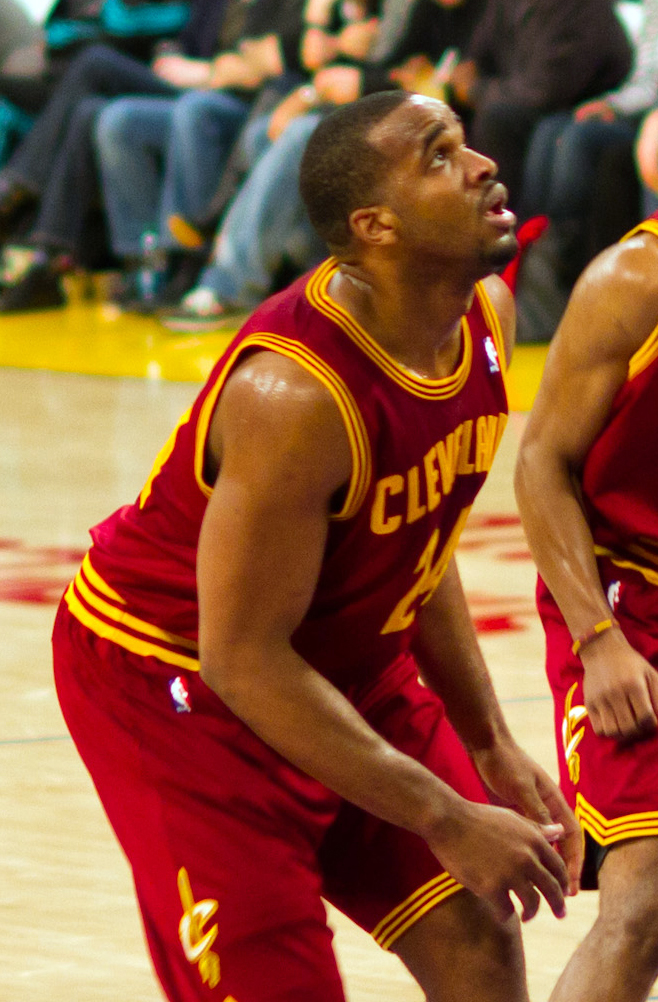
Samardo Samuels

- Samardo Samuels
- Omari Johnson
- Tyrique Jones
- Shevon Thompson
- Josh Minott

== Past rosters ==
Team for the 2014 Centrobasket.

Jamaica men's national basketball team roster
Players
Coaches

Pos.	No.	Name	Age – Date of birth	Height	Club
F	4	Mugabe Thomas	33 – 8 November 1980	6 ft 4 in (1.93 m)	Zonkeys de Tijuana	(Mexico)
G	5	Akeem Scott	30 – 9 September 1983	6 ft 1 in (1.85 m)	Guaiquiries	(Venezuela)
G	6	Damion Staple	33 – 8 September 1980	6 ft 7 in (2.01 m)	Panama City Breeze	(United States)
G	7	Garfield Blair	27 – 24 March 1987	6 ft 5 in (1.96 m)	Marín Peixegalego	(Spain)
C	8	Brandon Walters	25 – 3 August 1988	6 ft 8 in (2.03 m)	Siena Saints	(United States)
F	9	Ricardo Alliman	27 – 18 February 1987	6 ft 7 in (2.01 m)	AS Cherbourg	(France)
G	10	Mike Rogers	26 – 20 February 1988	6 ft 5 in (1.96 m)	Club Deportivo Estela Santander	(Spain)
SG	11	Kemar McLeish	27 – 2 December 1986	6 ft 3 in (1.91 m)	Majestic Gardens Legends	(Jamaica)
F	12	Brian Grant	26 – 20 December 1987	6 ft 8 in (2.03 m)	Cedarville Yellow Jackets	(United States)
G	13	Kwame Lawrence	26 – 9 January 1988	6 ft 6 in (1.98 m)	Urban Knights	(Jamaica)
C	14	Vashil Fernandez	22 – 15 January 1992	6 ft 10 in (2.08 m)	Valparaiso Crusaders	(United States)

Head coach

- (United States) Sam Vincent

Legend

- Club – describes last
  club before the tournament
- Age – describes age
  on 1 August 2014

Team for the 2013 FIBA Americas Championship.

Jamaica men's national basketball team roster
Players
Coaches

Pos.	No.	Name	Age – Date of birth	Height	Club
G	4	Dylan Ennis	21 – 26 December 1991	6 ft 2 in (1.88 m)	Villanova Wildcats
F/C	5	Adrian Uter	28 – 27 October 1984	6 ft 7 in (2.01 m)	Pallacanestro Cantù
F	6	Patrick Ewing Jr.	29 – 20 May 1984	6 ft 8 in (2.03 m)	Nea Kifissia B.C.
G/F	7	Garfield Blair	26 – 24 March 1987	6 ft 5 in (1.96 m)	Heartland Eagles
G	8	Weyinmi Efejuku	26 – 15 September 1986	6 ft 5 in (1.96 m)	Indios de Mayagüez
G	9	Akeem Scott	29 – 3 September 1983	6 ft 1 in (1.85 m)	Guaiqueríes
G	10	Durand Scott	23 – 22 February 1990	6 ft 5 in (1.96 m)	Obradoiro CAB
C	11	Jerome Jordan	26 – 29 September 1986	7 ft 1 in (2.16 m)	New Orleans Pelicans
F	12	Christopher Walker	18 – 3 October 1994	6 ft 10 in (2.08 m)	Florida Gators
F	13	Adrian Forbes	25 – 25 May 1988	6 ft 8 in (2.03 m)	Auburn Tigers
F/C	14	Samardo Samuels	24 – 9 January 1989	6 ft 9 in (2.06 m)	Olimpia Milano
C	15	Vashil Fernandez	21 – 15 January 1992	6 ft 11 in (2.11 m)	Pallacanestro Cantù

Head coach

- Sam Vincent

Legend

- Club – describes last
  club before the tournament
- Age – describes age
  on 30 August 2013

== Head coach position ==
- (United States) Alex Copeland – 2018-now

== Kit ==
=== Sponsor ===
2013: KFC

2021: Davis Law Group

== See also ==
- Jamaica women's national basketball team
- Jamaica men's national under-19 basketball team
- Jamaica men's national under-17 basketball team
- Jamaica men's national 3x3 team
