= FIBA Caribbean Championship =

Basketball tournament

- Formerly: CARICOM Basketball Championship; CBC Championship
- Sport: Basketball
- Founded: 1981
- Founder: John Yates (CARICOM)
- First season: 1981
- Organizing body: FIBA Americas
- Motto: We Got Game
- Country: FIBA Americas member nations
- Continent: Americas
- Most recent champions: Men: Virgin Islands (3rd title); Women: Virgin Islands (1st title)
- Most titles: Men: Bahamas (7 titles); Women: Cuba; Trinidad and Tobago (4 titles each)
- Broadcaster: CMC
- Related competitions: COCABA Championship; Centrobasket
- Website: Men's competition archive Women's competition archive

The FIBA Caribbean Championship, formerly known as the CBC Championship or CARICOM Basketball Championship, is a FIBA-sponsored international basketball tournament where national teams from the Caribbean participate. These countries are members of the Caribbean Basketball Confederation (CBC). The top three or four teams typically earn berths to the Centrobasket where they compete for spots in the FIBA AmeriCup, from which they can qualify for the FIBA Basketball World Cup or Summer Olympics. There are currently 24 Caribbean countries that may compete in this event.

The men's tournament was typically played every two years. Puerto Rico was traditionally the strongest team from this region winning Gold in 1985 with players like NBA hopeful Ramón Ramos and Ferdinand Martinez (MVP). They rarely competed as the squad usually has already earned a berth in the subsequent Centrobasket. The last edition of the men's CBC Championship took place in 2015. Since 2018, the Caribbean pre-qualifiers for the Pan-American pre-qualifiers of the FIBA AmeriCup have been held instead.

The women's tournament has been played from 1981 to the present. In 2018, the competition was rebranded as the FIBA Women's Caribbean Championship.

== Men's tournament ==
=== Summaries ===
Year	Host (Final phase/game)	Gold medal game			Bronze medal game		
Year	Host (Final phase/game)	Gold	Score	Silver	Bronze	Score	Fourth place
1981	Guyana (Georgetown)	Jamaica	?	Trinidad and Tobago	Guyana	?	Barbados
1982	Jamaica (Kingston)	Bahamas	?	Trinidad and Tobago	Jamaica	?	?
1984	The Bahamas (Nassau)	Bahamas	?	Jamaica	Guyana	?	?
1985	Barbados (Bridgetown)	Bahamas	?	Barbados	Guyana	?	?
1986	Trinidad and Tobago (Port of Spain)	Trinidad and Tobago	?	?	?	?	?
1987	Suriname (Paramaribo)	Trinidad and Tobago	?	Guyana	Suriname	?	?
1988	Guyana (Georgetown)	Trinidad and Tobago	?	Guyana	Barbados	?	Antigua and Barbuda
1990	Trinidad and Tobago (Port of Spain)	Trinidad and Tobago	?	Barbados	Jamaica	?	?
1991	Jamaica (Kingston)	Bahamas	?	Jamaica	Trinidad and Tobago	?	?
1993	Barbados (Bridgetown)	Bahamas	?	Barbados	Jamaica	?	?
1994	Guyana (Georgetown)	Barbados	?	Guyana	Jamaica	?	?
1995	Bahamas (Nassau)	Bahamas	?	Jamaica	Trinidad and Tobago	?	?
1996	Trinidad and Tobago (Port of Spain)	Jamaica	86–78	Trinidad and Tobago	Bahamas	133–120	Guyana
1998	Belize (Belize City)	Belize	75–71	Barbados	Bahamas	90–76	Jamaica
2000	Barbados (Bridgetown)	Barbados	64–56	Virgin Islands	Guyana	87–67	Belize
2002	Virgin Islands (St. Thomas)	Virgin Islands	60–57	Dominican Republic	Antigua and Barbuda	76–75	Bahamas
2004	Cuba (Santiago)	Cuba	90–77	Barbados	Antigua and Barbuda	77–60	Jamaica
2006	Jamaica (Kingston)	Jamaica	76–59	Virgin Islands	Cuba	76–65	Bahamas
2007	Puerto Rico (Caguas)	Puerto Rico	81–72	Dominican Republic	Cuba	90–88	Bahamas
2009	British Virgin Islands (Tortola)	Jamaica	65–61	British Virgin Islands	Cuba	91–77	Trinidad and Tobago
2011	The Bahamas (Nassau)	Virgin Islands	91–89	Bahamas	Jamaica	55–54	British Virgin Islands
2014	British Virgin Islands (Tortola)	Bahamas	75–64	Cuba	Virgin Islands	102–68	British Virgin Islands
2015	British Virgin Islands (Tortola)	Virgin Islands	71–65	Bahamas	Antigua and Barbuda	82–73	British Virgin Islands

=== Medal table (incomplete) ===
Rank	Nation	Gold	Silver	Bronze	Total
1	Bahamas	7	2	2	11
2	Jamaica	4	3	5	12
3	Trinidad and Tobago	4	3	2	9
4	Virgin Islands	3	2	1	6
5	Barbados	2	5	1	8
6	Cuba	1	1	3	5
7	Belize	1	0	0	1
7	Puerto Rico	1	0	0	1
9	Guyana	0	3	4	7
10	Dominican Republic	0	2	0	2
11	British Virgin Islands	0	1	0	1
12	Antigua and Barbuda	0	0	3	3
13	Suriname	0	0	1	1
Totals (13 entries)		23	22	22	67

=== Participation details ===
Team	(Guyana) 1981	(Jamaica) 1982	(The Bahamas) 1984	(Barbados) 1985	(Trinidad and Tobago) 1986	(Suriname) 1987	(Guyana) 1988	(Trinidad and Tobago) 1990	(Jamaica) 1991	(Barbados) 1993	(Guyana) 1994	(Barbados) 1995	(Trinidad and Tobago) 1996	(Belize) 1998	(Barbados) 2000	(United States Virgin Islands) 2002	(Cuba) 2004	(Jamaica) 2006	(Puerto Rico) 2007	(British Virgin Islands) 2009	(The Bahamas) 2011	(British Virgin Islands) 2014	(British Virgin Islands) 2015	Total
Antigua and Barbuda	?	?	?	?	?	?	?	?	?	?	?	?	?	-	5th	3rd	3rd	6th	5th	7th	6th	7th	3rd	≥9
Aruba	-	-	-	-	?	?	?	?	?	?	?	?	?	-	-	8th	-	-	-	-	-	-	-	≥1
Bahamas	?	1st	1st	1st	?	?	?	?	1st	1st	?	1st	3rd	3rd	-	4th	5th	4th	4th	5th	2nd	1st	2nd	≥16
Barbados	4th	?	?	?	?	?	?	?	?	?	1st	?	?	2nd	1st	5th	2nd	5th	6th	6th	-	6th	7th	≥11
Bermuda	-	-	-	-	-	-	-	-	-	-	-	-	-	-	-	-	-	-	-	8th	5th	-	8th	3
Belize	?	?	?	?	?	?	?	?	?	?	?	?	?	1st	4th	-	-	-	-	-	-	-	-	≥2
British Virgin Islands	?	?	?	?	?	?	?	?	?	?	?	?	?	-	-	7th	-	-	7th	2nd	4th	4th	4th	≥6
Cayman Islands	?	?	?	?	?	?	?	?	?	?	?	?	?	-	-	-	-	-	-	-	9th	-	9th	≥2
Cuba	?	?	?	?	?	?	?	?	?	?	?	?	?	-	-	-	1st	3rd	3rd	3rd	-	2nd	-	≥5
Dominica	?	?	?	?	?	?	?	?	?	?	?	?	?	-	6th	-	-	-	-	-	-	-	-	≥1
Dominican Republic	?	?	?	?	?	?	?	?	?	?	?	?	?	-	-	2nd	-	-	2nd	-	-	-	-	≥2
Guyana	3rd	-	?	-	-	?	5th	?	-	?	2nd	-	4th	-	3rd	-	-	-	8th	-	7th	5th	10th	9
Jamaica	1st	?	?	?	?	?	?	?	?	?	?	?	1st	4th	9th	6th	4th	1st	-	1st	3rd	-	-	≥9
Puerto Rico	?	?	?	?	?	?	?	?	?	?	?	?	?	-	-	-	-	-	1st	-	-	-	-	≥1
Saint Kitts and Nevis	?	?	?	?	?	?	?	?	?	?	?	?	?	-	8th	-	-	8th	-	-	-	-	-	≥2
Saint Vincent and the Grenadines	-	-	-	?	?	?	?	?	?	?	?	?	?	-	-	9th	-	7th	-	-	8th	8th	6th	≥5
Suriname	?	?	?	?	?	?	?	?	?	?	?	?	?	?	?	?	?	?	?	?	?	?	5th	1
Trinidad and Tobago	2nd	2nd	?	?	1st	1st	1st	1st	?	?	?	?	2nd	-	7th	-	-	-	9th	4th	-	-	-	≥10
Turks and Caicos Islands	-	-	-	-	-	-	-	-	-	-	-	-	-	-	-	-	7th	-	-	-	-	-	-	1
Virgin Islands	?	?	?	?	?	?	?	?	?	?	?	?	?	-	2nd	1st	6th	2nd	-	-	1st	3rd	1st	≥7

== Women's tournament ==
=== Summaries ===
Year	Host (Final phase/game)	Gold medal game			Bronze medal game		
Year	Host (Final phase/game)	Gold	Score	Silver	Bronze	Score	Fourth place
1981	Guyana (Georgetown)	?	?	?	?	?	?
1982	Jamaica (Kingston)	?	?	?	?	?	?
1984	The Bahamas (Nassau)	?	?	?	?	?	?
1985	Barbados (Bridgetown)	Trinidad and Tobago	?	?	?	?	?
1986	Trinidad and Tobago (Port of Spain)	Trinidad and Tobago	?	?	?	?	?
1987	Suriname (Paramaribo)	Trinidad and Tobago	?	?	?	?	?
1988	Guyana (Georgetown)	Suriname	?	Trinidad and Tobago	?	?	?
1990	Trinidad and Tobago (Port of Spain)	Trinidad and Tobago	?	?	?	?	?
1991	Jamaica (Kingston)	?	?	?	?	?	?
1993	Barbados (Bridgetown)	Bahamas	?	?	?	?	?
1994	Guyana (Georgetown)	Bahamas	?	Trinidad and Tobago	?	?	?
1995	Bahamas (Nassau)	?	?	?	?	?	?
1996	Trinidad and Tobago (Port of Spain)	Guyana	?	Jamaica	Trinidad and Tobago	?	?
1998	Belize (Belize City)	Bahamas	59–52	Jamaica	Barbados	66–62	Guyana
2000	Barbados (Bridgetown)	Barbados	?	Jamaica	Trinidad and Tobago	?	Bahamas
2002	Virgin Islands (St. Thomas)	Dominican Republic	85–71	Puerto Rico	Virgin Islands	63–59	Bahamas
2004	Cuba (Santiago de Cuba)	Cuba	72–53	Puerto Rico	Jamaica	53–45	Barbados
2006	Jamaica (Kingston)	Jamaica	Round Robin	Virgin Islands	Barbados	Round Robin	Bahamas
2007	Puerto Rico (Morovis)	Puerto Rico	67–43	Trinidad and Tobago	Dominican Republic	84–45	Barbados
2011	The Bahamas (Nassau)	Cuba	Round Robin	Trinidad and Tobago	Virgin Islands	Round Robin	Dominican Republic
2014	British Virgin Islands (Tortola)	Jamaica	51–45	Dominican Republic	Virgin Islands	65–52	Trinidad and Tobago
2015	British Virgin Islands (Tortola)	Bahamas	55–51	Jamaica	Virgin Islands	98–47	Barbados
2018	Suriname (Paramaribo)	Cuba	66–55	Dominican Republic	Bahamas	65–56	Barbados
2022	Cuba (La Havana)	Cuba	79–60	Dominican Republic	Bahamas	68–57	Jamaica
2025	Guyana (Georgetown)	Virgin Islands	Round Robin	Guyana	Bahamas	Round Robin	Jamaica

=== Medal table (incomplete) ===
Rank	Nation	Gold	Silver	Bronze	Total
1	Trinidad and Tobago	4	4	2	10
2	Bahamas	4	0	3	7
3	Cuba	4	0	0	4
4	Jamaica	2	4	1	7
5	Dominican Republic	1	3	1	5
6	Puerto Rico	1	2	0	3
7	Virgin Islands	1	1	4	6
8	Guyana	1	1	0	2
9	Barbados	1	0	2	3
10	Suriname	1	0	0	1
Totals (10 entries)		20	15	13	48

== See also ==
- FIBA COCABA Championship
- Centrobasket
