= British Virgin Islands women's national basketball team =

British Virgin Islands
- FIBA ranking: ▲ (18 March 2026)
- Joined FIBA: 1979
- FIBA zone: FIBA Americas
- National federation: British Virgin Islands Amateur Basketball Federation
- Coach: Brian Brewley

Americas Championship for Women
- Appearances: None

Caribbean Championship for Women
- Appearances: ?
- Medals: None
Home	Away

The British Virgin Islands women's national basketball team represents the British Virgin Islands (BVI) in international women's basketball competitions. It is administered by the British Virgin Islands Amateur Basketball Federation.

== See also ==
- British Virgin Islands women's national under-19 basketball team
- British Virgin Islands women's national under-17 basketball team
- British Virgin Islands women's national 3x3 team
