= Arquelio Torres Ramírez Coliseum =

Sports arena in San Germán, Puerto Rico

Arquelio Torres Ramírez Coliseum Coliseo Arquelio Torres Ramírez
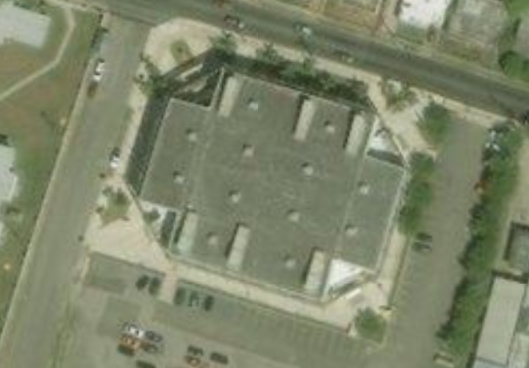
- Interactive map of Arquelio Torres Ramírez Coliseum; Coliseo Arquelio Torres Ramírez
- Location: San Germán, Puerto Rico
- Coordinates: 18°04′41.33″N 67°01′48.99″W
- Owner: Municipality of San Germán
- Operator: Municipality of San Germán
- Capacity: 5000

Construction
- Opened: 1985

Tenant
- Atléticos de San Germán (BSN)

The Arquelio Torres Ramírez Coliseum (Spanish: Coliseo Arquelio Torres Ramírez) is a sports arena in San Germán, Puerto Rico also known as "La Cuna" or "El hogar del monstruo anaranjado". It has a capacity of 5000 people. It was remodeled in preparation for the 2010 Central American and Caribbean Games. The basketball club Atléticos de San Germán hosts its home games at the Coliseum.
