= Ruth Maxon Adams =

American architect

- Born: 1883; Beloit, Wisconsin
- Died: March 18, 1970 (aged 86); Cornwall, Connecticut
- Occupation: Architect

Ruth Maxon Adams (1883–1970) was an American architect and interior designer who opened her own office as a solo practitioner in New York City, prior to World War I. She was a graduate of Vassar College and did extensive interior design work for community spaces and offices for the school as well as designing five houses in the area for women faculty. She was the architect for the summer colony Yelping Hill in Cornwall, Connecticut, for which she designed nine homes in the 1920s.

== Biography ==
Ruth Maxon Adams was an American architect whose contributions to residential design and communal living spaces helped shape early 20th-century American architecture. Born in 1883 in Beloit, WisconsinBeloit, Adams grew up in a progressive family that valued education and the arts. She attended Vassar College, where she graduated in 1904. Following her undergraduate studies, she pursued architecture through self-education and mentorship, as formal architectural education was less accessible to women at the time. She also studied at the New York School of Applied Design for Women, which allowed her to gain practical experience in architectural drafting and theory.¹

The pain point Adams addressed through her work was the lack of accessible, thoughtfully designed communal living spaces for women and progressive thinkers. At a time when cities were growing increasingly congested and individualistic, Adams envisioned architecture that fostered community interaction and holistic living. Her designs incorporated shared gardens, natural light, and multi-purpose spaces to enhance both practicality and beauty.

== Vassar College ==
Adams did projects in and around Vassar College over a period of 25 years, which at the time was restricted to women students. Within the college many of these projects could be considered "interior decoration" and for 10 years she served as a “consulting interior designer” to the college. As cited in the Nicholas Adams monograph (part of the Pioneering Women in American Architecture series) her projects included “dormitory parlors, and rooms, changing from message centers to card rooms, to smoking rooms and back to reception rooms."

During this period, she also designed houses for many Vassar faculty members, in various styles. These included a Tudor-style house for Vassar professors Edith Fahnestock and Rose Jeffries Peebles, a neo-colonial house for history professor Violet Barbour and her mother, and a brick two-story house for Mildred Thompson, the dean of the college which later became the Dean's official residence. Most of these houses were in the Arlington neighborhood of Poughkeepsie close to the college.

== Yelping Hill ==
The Yelping Hill community was private summer colony founded in 1922 by a group of six families, many of them faculty families at Vassar or Yale. Ruth Maxon Adams was among the members and laid out the community and served as architect for most of the original houses, as well as overseeing the conversion of an existing barn into a community center. One of the founders, Henry Seidel Canby, was said to be influenced by feminist proposals for collective domestic work and kitchenless houses, and he persuaded a group of his friends to purchase land that was to be collectively owned. As described by Sarah Allaback, "The houses were without kitchens--meals were taken in a communal dining room--and childcare was provided."

Per Nicholas Adams, overall, the houses had an improvised handmade Arts-and-Crafts character, with many details unrefined. House profiles were often vertical (like Alpine cottages) with steep “fairy tale” roofs or, as the comparison is often made, like “Ginger Bread” houses.
