= Saint Vincent and the Grenadines women's national basketball team =

Saint Vincent and the Grenadines
- FIBA ranking: 102 (8 August 2025)
- Joined FIBA: 1984
- FIBA zone: FIBA Americas
- National federation: St. Vincent and the Grenadines Basketball Association
- Coach: Wayne Williams

Americas Championship for Women
- Appearances: None

Caribbean Championship for Women
- Appearances: ?
- Medals: None
| Home | Away |

The Saint Vincent and the Grenadines women's national basketball team represents Saint Vincent and the Grenadines in international competitions. It is administered by the St. Vincent and the Grenadines Basketball Association.
