= Trinidad and Tobago women's national basketball team =

Basketball team

Bahamas (Trinidad and Tobago)
- FIBA ranking: ▲ (18 March 2026)
- Joined FIBA: 1958
- FIBA zone: FIBA Americas
- National federation: National Basketball Federation of Trinidad and Tobago (NBFTT)
- Coach: Laerie Sandy

Olympic Games
- Appearances: None

World Cup
- Appearances: None

FIBA Americas Championship for Women
- Appearances: None
Home	Away

The Trinidad and Tobago women's national basketball team is the women's national basketball team of Trinidad and Tobago. It is managed by the National Basketball Federation of Trinidad and Tobago (NBFTT).

Trinidad and Tobago won the silver medal at the 2011 CBC Championship for Women.

== See also ==
- Trinidad and Tobago women's national under-17 basketball team
