= Guyana women's national basketball team =

Guyana
- FIBA ranking: 95 ▲23 (14 September 2026)
- Joined FIBA: 1961
- FIBA zone: FIBA Americas
- National federation: Guyana Amateur Basketball Federation (GABF)
- Coach: Ann Gordon

Americas Championship for Women
- Appearances: None

Caribbean Championship for Women
- Appearances: ?
- Medals: None
Home	Away

The Guyana women's national basketball team represents Guyana in international competitions. It is governed by the Guyana Amateur Basketball Federation (GABF).

== See also ==
- Basketball in Guyana
