= Bahamas women's national basketball team =

Bahamas
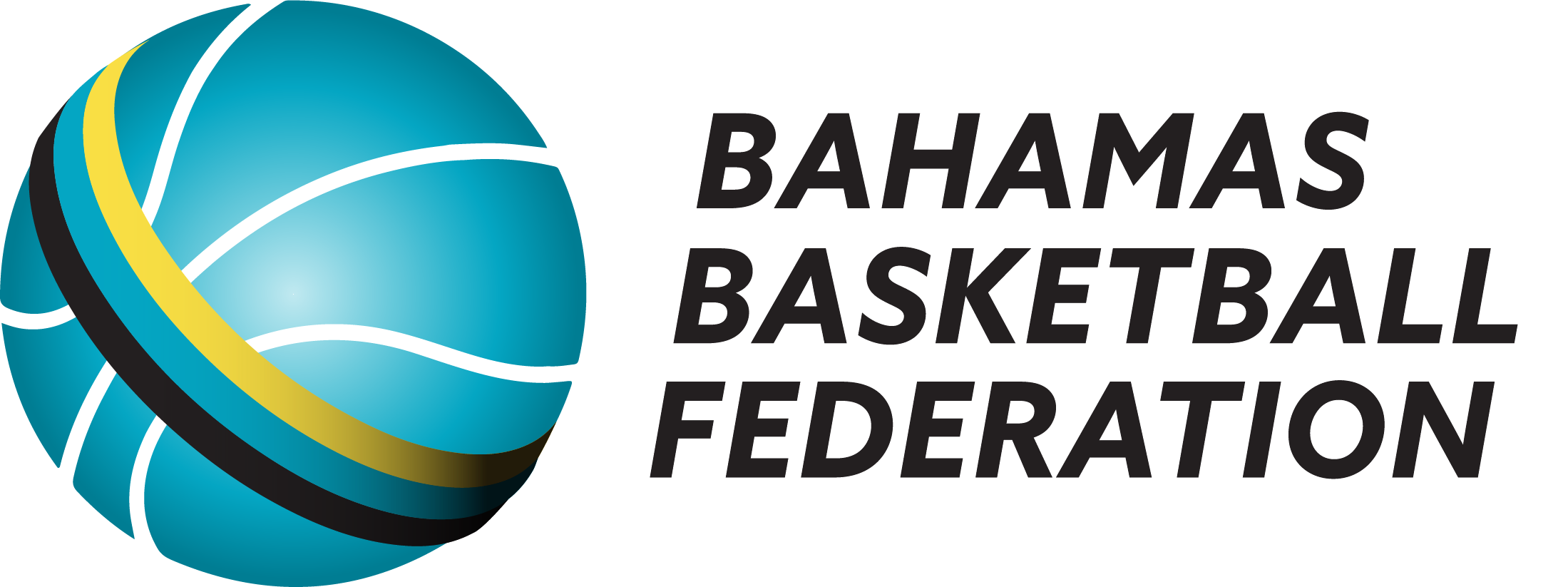
- FIBA ranking: 67 ▲20 (14 September 2026)
- Joined FIBA: 1962
- FIBA zone: FIBA Americas
- National federation: Bahamas Basketball Federation
- Coach: Yolett McPhee-McCuin

FIBA Women's AmeriCup
- Appearances: 1
- Medals: None
Home	Away

The Bahamas women's national basketball team is the women's national basketball team of The Bahamas. It is managed by the Bahamas Basketball Federation.

The Bahamas won the gold medal at the 2015 FIBA CBC Championship for Women.

== Head coach position ==
- (The Bahamas) Yolett McPhee-McCuin – 2014 - 2017
- (The Bahamas) Wayde Watson – Since 2018

== See also ==
- Bahamas men's national basketball team
- Bahamas women's national under-18 basketball team
- Bahamas women's national under-17 basketball team
