= Jamaica women's national basketball team =

National basketball team

Jamaica
- FIBA ranking: 109 (18 March 2026)
- Joined FIBA: 1962
- FIBA zone: FIBA Americas
- National federation: Jamaica Basketball Association
- Coach: Timothy Eatman
- Nickname: JAMROCKERZ

Olympic Games
- Appearances: None

World Cup
- Appearances: None

FIBA Americas Women's Championship
- Appearances: 3
- Medals: None

Caribbean Championship
- Appearances: 4
- Medals: (2): 2006, 2014 (1): 2015 (1): 2004
Home	Away

The Jamaica women's national basketball team is governed by the Jamaica Basketball Association.

== Notable players ==
=== WNBA players ===
The following Jamaica basketball internationals have played in the WNBA

- Simone Edwards

=== Netball and Basketball ===
The following Jamaica basketball internationals also played for the Jamaica national netball team.

Player	Netball Apps	Years	Basketball Apps	Years
Althea Byfield	100+	199x–2016	47+	2006–2015
Oberon Pitterson	120+	1988–2006	27+	2006–2010
