= Virgin Islands women's national basketball team =

Women's national basketball team

United States Virgin Islands
- FIBA ranking: ▲ (14 September 2026)
- FIBA zone: FIBA Americas
- Coach: Tajama Ngongba

FIBA Women's AmeriCup
- Appearances: 3

The Virgin Islands women's national basketball team is the basketball team which represents the United States Virgin Islands in women's international basketball competitions.

The country earned its first continental berth at the 2015 FIBA Americas Women's Championship.

They also competed at the 2017 FIBA Women's AmeriCup, where they qualified for the 2019 Pan American Games in Lima, Peru.

== FIBA Americas Championship record ==
- 2015 – 9th place
- 2017 – 5th place
- 2021 – 8th place
- 2027 – To be determined

== Current roster ==
Roster for the 2021 FIBA Women's AmeriCup.

Virgin Islands women's national basketball team roster
Players
Coaches

Pos.	No.	Name	Age – Date of birth	Height	Club	Ctr.
G	0	Kadasha Barry	25 – 26 July 1995	1.70 m (5 ft 7 in)
F	4	Molina Williams	19 – 2 November 2001	1.83 m (6 ft 0 in)	Charlotte 49ers	(United States)
G	5	Taylor Jones	23 – 12 July 1997	1.73 m (5 ft 8 in)	ZKK RMU Banovici	(Bosnia and Herzegovina)
G	6	Shomyra Francis	18 – 11 October 2002	1.75 m (5 ft 9 in)	Weatherford Coyotes	(United States)
G	7	Imani Tate	25 – 7 December 1995	1.74 m (5 ft 9 in)	Laboratorios Ynsadiet Leganes	(Spain)
G	8	Brittney Matthew	27 – 7 August 1993	1.70 m (5 ft 7 in)	Stephen F. Austin Ladyjacks	(United States)
SF	10	Lanese Bough	27 – 12 July 1993	1.73 m (5 ft 8 in)
F	11	Natalie Day	30 – 23 June 1990	1.83 m (6 ft 0 in)	Catz Lappeenranta	(Finland)
C	12	Anisha George	23 – 26 May 1998	1.88 m (6 ft 2 in)	Hélios VS Basket	(Switzerland)
F	13	Naja Ngongba Ngongba	18 – 17 March 2003	1.80 m (5 ft 11 in)	Radford Highlanders	(United States)
F	14	Alexis Boston	22 – 31 May 1999	1.85 m (6 ft 1 in)
PG	22	Akeema Richards	30 – 14 March 1991	1.74 m (5 ft 9 in)	Delaware Fightin' Blue Hens	(United States)

Head coach

- (United States Virgin Islands) Tajama Ngongba

Assistant coach(es)

- (United States Virgin Islands) Clint Williams

Legend

- Club – describes last
  club before the tournament
- Age – describes age
  on 11 June 2021
