= FIBA Women's AmeriCup All-Tournament Team =

The FIBA Women's AmeriCup All-Tournament Team is a FIBA award given every two years, awarded to the five strongest competitors throughout the tournament.

== Honourees ==
Year	Player	Position	Team	Ref.
2011	Adriana Moisés Pinto	Guard	Brazil	
2011	Oyanaisis Gelis	Guard	Cuba	
2011	Kim Smith	Guard	Canada	
2011	Érica Sánchez	Forward	Argentina	
2011	Érika de Souza	Center	Brazil	
2013	Carla Cortijo	Guard	Puerto Rico	
2013	Kim Gaucher (2)	Guard	Canada	
2013	Yamara Amargo	Forward	Cuba	
2013	Clarissa dos Santos	Forward	Brazil	
2013	Gisela Vega	Center	Argentina	
2015	Melisa Gretter	Guard	Argentina	
2015	Kia Nurse	Guard	Canada	
2015	Yamara Amargo (2)	Forward	Cuba	
2015	Tamara Tatham	Forward	Canada	
2015	Clenia Noblet	Center	Cuba	
2017	Melisa Gretter (2)	Guard	Argentina	
2017	Nirra Fields	Guard	Canada	
2017	Paola Ferrari	Guard	Paraguay	
2017	Allison Gibson	Forward	Puerto Rico	
2017	Miranda Ayim	Forward	Canada	
2019	Jordin Canada	Guard	United States	
2019	Diamond DeShields	Forward	United States	
2019	Damiris Dantas	Forward	Brazil	
2019	Kayla Alexander	Center	Canada	
2019	Sylvia Fowles	Center	United States	
2021	Manuela Ríos	Guard	Colombia	
2021	Jennifer O'Neill	Guard	Puerto Rico	
2021	Rhyne Howard	Guard	United States	
2021	Clarissa dos Santos (2)	Forward	Brazil	
2021	Elissa Cunane	Center	United States	
2023	Arella Guirantes	Guard	Puerto Rico	
2023	Damiris Dantas	Forward	Brazil	
2023	Rickea Jackson	Forward	United States	
2023	Kamilla Cardoso	Center	Brazil	
2023	Kayla Alexander (2)	Center	Canada	
2025	Mikayla Blakes	Guard	United States	
2025	Hannah Hidalgo	Guard	United States	
2025	Syla Swords	Guard	Canada	
2025	Kamilla Cardoso (2)	Center	Brazil	
2025	Damiris Dantas	Center	Brazil	

== See also ==
- FIBA Women's AmeriCup Most Valuable Player
- FIBA Women's Basketball World Cup Most Valuable Player
- FIBA Women's Basketball World Cup All-Tournament Team
- FIBA Awards
