= 2024 FIBA Women's Olympic Qualifying Tournaments – Belém =

Basketball tournament in Brazil

2024 FIBA World Olympic Qualifying Tournament for Women
Tournament details
- Host country: Brazil
- City: Belém
- Dates: 8–11 February
- Teams: 4 (from 3 confederations)
- Venue: 1 (in 1 host city)

Final positions
- Champions: Australia
- Runners-up: Germany
- Third place: Serbia
- Fourth place: Brazil

Tournament statistics
- Games played: 6
- Attendance: 31,282 (5,214 per game)
- MVP: (Australia) Ezi Magbegor
- Top scorer: (Serbia) Yvonne Anderson (19.3 ppg)

Official website
- WOQT Brazil

The 2024 FIBA Women's Olympic Qualifying Tournament in Belém was one of four 2024 FIBA Women's Olympic Qualifying Tournaments to determine the competitors for the 2024 Summer Olympics basketball tournament. The tournament was held at Belém, Brazil, from 8 to 11 February 2024.

== Teams ==
Team	Qualification	Date of qualification	WR
Australia	Top four at 2023 FIBA Women's Asia Cup	28 June 2023	3
Brazil	Winner of 2023 FIBA Women's AmeriCup	9 July 2023	8
Serbia	Top six at EuroBasket Women 2023	24 June 2023	10
Germany	Top six at EuroBasket Women 2023	24 June 2023	25

== Venue ==
Belém	2024 FIBA Women's Olympic Qualifying Tournaments – Belém (Brazil)
Arena Guilherme Paraense	2024 FIBA Women's Olympic Qualifying Tournaments – Belém (Brazil)
Capacity: 11,970	2024 FIBA Women's Olympic Qualifying Tournaments – Belém (Brazil)

== Standings ==
Pos	Team	Pld	W	L	PF	PA	PD	Pts	Qualification
1	Australia	3	3	0	220	180	+40	6	Summer Olympics
2	Germany	3	2	1	198	222	−24	5	Summer Olympics
3	Serbia	3	1	2	211	213	−2	4	Summer Olympics
4	Brazil (H)	3	0	3	191	205	−14	3	

Source: FIBA
Rules for classification: 1) Points; 2) Head-to-head results; 3) Points difference; 4) Points scored.
(H) Hosts

== Results ==
All times are local (UTC−3).

8 February 2024
17:00

Boxscore

Germany	73–66	Serbia
Scoring by quarter: 19–12, 17–9, 17–25, 20–20
Pts: Fiebich 20; Rebs: N. Sabally 17; Asts: S. Sabally 5		Pts: Dugalić 13; Rebs: Stanković 6 Asts: Anderson 7

Arena Guilherme Paraense, Belém
Attendance: 1,200
Referees: Leonardo Zalazar (ARG), Andrés Bartel (URU), Carmelo de la Rosa (PUR)

8 February 2024
20:00

Boxscore

Brazil	55–60	Australia
Scoring by quarter: 16–19, 7–14, 24–16, 8–11
Pts: Dantas, Cardoso 11; Rebs: Cardoso 6 Asts: Costa, Cardoso 4		Pts: Magbegor 18; Rebs: Allen, Magbegor 7 Asts: Allen 4

Arena Guilherme Paraense, Belém
Attendance: 7,270
Referees: Johnny Batista (PUR), Gvidas Gedvilas (LAT), Yevgeniy Mikheyev (KAZ)

10 February 2024
17:00

Boxscore

Australia	85–52	Germany
Scoring by quarter: 24–10, 30–14, 21–21, 10–7
Pts: Madgen 15; Rebs: Smith 8 Asts: Whitcomb 4		Pts: Fiebich 12; Rebs: Geiselsöder, Gülich 6 Asts: Brunckhorst 4

Arena Guilherme Paraense, Belém
Attendance: 2,649
Referees: Leonardo Zalazar (ARG), Beniamino Attard (ITA), Carlos Vélez (COL)

10 February 2024
20:00

Boxscore

Serbia	72–65	Brazil
Scoring by quarter: 23–20, 16–18, 17–16, 16–11
Pts: Anderson 30; Rebs: Stanković 10; Asts: Anderson, Krajišnik 2		Pts: Dantas 17; Rebs: Cardoso 14; Asts: Costa 6

Arena Guilherme Paraense, Belém
Attendance: 9,018
Referees: Johnny Batista (PUR), Andrés Bartel (URU), Gvidas Gedvilas (LAT)

11 February 2024
17:00

Boxscore

Serbia	73–75	Australia
Scoring by quarter: 22–12, 12–23, 14–16, 25–24
Pts: Anderson 20; Rebs: Krajišnik 9 Asts: Nogić 6		Pts: Tolo 13; Rebs: Tolo 7 Asts: Borlase, Melbourne 4

Arena Guilherme Paraense, Belém
Attendance: 2,667
Referees: Johnny Batista (PUR), Gvidas Gedvilas (LAT), Carmelo de la Rosa (PUR)

11 February 2024
20:00

Boxscore

Brazil	71–73	Germany
Scoring by quarter: 14–19, 21–20, 18–18, 18–16
Pts: Dantas 20; Rebs: Cardoso 13; Asts: Costa 5		Pts: Fiebich 22; Rebs: Fiebich, S. Sabally 11; Asts: Gülich, S. Sabally 4

Arena Guilherme Paraense, Belém
Attendance: 8,478
Referees: Leonardo Zalazar (ARG), Andrés Bartel (URU), Yevgeniy Mikheyev (KAZ)

== Statistics and awards ==
=== Statistical leaders ===
Players

Points

Name	PPG
(Serbia) Yvonne Anderson	19.3
(Germany) Satou Sabally	19.0
(Germany) Leonie Fiebich	18.0
(Brazil) Damiris Dantas	16.0
(Brazil) Kamilla Cardoso	15.3

Rebounds

Name	RPG
(Brazil) Kamilla Cardoso	11.0
(Germany) Nyara Sabally	11.0
(Germany) Satou Sabally	10.0
(Germany) Leonie Fiebich	7.3
(Serbia) Dragana Stanković	6.7

Assists

Name	APG
(Brazil) Débora Costa	5.0
(Germany) Satou Sabally	4.5
(Serbia) Yvonne Anderson	3.7
(Germany) Svenja Brunckhorst	3.3
(Brazil) Tainá Paixão	3.0
(Serbia) Jovana Nogić	3.0

Blocks

Name	BPG
(Australia) Ezi Magbegor	3.0
(Serbia) Dragana Stanković	2.7
(Germany) Nyara Sabally	2.0
(Germany) Leonie Fiebich	1.3
(Australia) Sami Whitcomb	1.0
(Serbia) Tina Krajišnik	1.0

Steals

Name	SPG
(Serbia) Yvonne Anderson	3.0
(Australia) Sami Whitcomb	2.0
(Brazil) Débora Costa	2.0
(Germany) Satou Sabally	2.0
(Brazil) Kamilla Cardoso	1.7
(Brazil) Tainá Paixão	1.7
(Germany) Leonie Fiebich	1.7
(Serbia) Dragana Stanković	1.7

Efficiency

Name	EFFPG
(Brazil) Kamilla Cardoso	20.7
(Germany) Leonie Fiebich	19.7
(Serbia) Yvonne Anderson	18.7
(Serbia) Dragana Stanković	18.7
(Australia) Ezi Magbegor	17.7

==== Teams ====
Points

Team	PPG
Australia	73.3
Serbia	70.3
Germany	66.0
Brazil	63.7

Rebounds

Team	RPG
Germany	43.7
Serbia	41.3
Australia	40.0
Brazil	39.0

Assists

Team	APG
Brazil	16.7
Australia	16.0
Germany	15.3
Serbia	12.3

Blocks

Team	BPG
Australia	6.3
Serbia	4.7
Germany	4.3
Brazil	1.3

Steals

Team	SPG
Serbia	9.7
Brazil	8.3
Australia	8.0
Germany	5.3

Efficiency

Team	EFFPG
Australia	84.0
Serbia	70.3
Germany	64.0
Brazil	63.0

=== Awards ===
The all star-team and MVP were announced on 11 February 2024.

All-Star Team
Guards	Forwards	Centers
(Serbia) Yvonne Anderson (Australia) Rebecca Allen	(Germany) Leonie Fiebich	(Australia) Ezi Magbegor (Brazil) Kamilla Cardoso
MVP: (Australia) Ezi Magbegor
