= 2014 South American Basketball Championship for Women =

34th South American Women's Basketball Championship

Tournament details
- Host country: Ecuador
- City: Ambato
- Dates: 14–18 August
- Teams: 8 (from 1 confederation)
- Venue: 1 (in 1 host city)

Final positions
- Champions: Brazil (25th title)
- Runners-up: Argentina
- Third place: Venezuela

Tournament statistics
- MVP: (Brazil) Clarissa dos Santos
- Top scorer: (Chile) Ziomara Morrison
- Top rebounds: (Chile) Ziomara Morrison
- Top assists: (Argentina) Melisa Gretter
- PPG (Team): Brazil
- RPG (Team): Brazil
- APG (Team): Argentina

Official website
- 2014 South American Championship for Women

The 2014 South American Basketball Championship for Women was the 34th edition of the tournament. Eight teams participated in the competition, held in Ambato, Ecuador, from 14 to 18 August 2014. Brazil won the tournament, their fifteenth consecutive title and 25th overall.

== Preliminary round ==
Qualified for the semifinals

=== Group A ===
Team	Pts	Pld	W	L	PF	PA	PD
Argentina	6	3	3	0	234	153	+81
Chile	5	3	2	1	227	210	+17
Paraguay	4	3	1	2	196	210	–14
Peru	3	3	0	3	146	230	–84

August 14
14:00

Report

Chile	76–56	Peru
Scoring by quarter: 17–20, 17–1, 24–19, 18–16
Pts: Morrison 21; Rebs: Morrison 13; Asts: Gamboa, Cousiño 2		Pts: Porras, Plasencia 14; Rebs: Quiroz, Plasencia 6 Asts: five players 1

August 14
18:00

Report

Argentina	77–45	Paraguay
Scoring by quarter: 14–9, 16–7, 25–14, 22–15
Pts: Vega 20; Rebs: Vega 19; Asts: Gretter 8		Pts: Peralta 10; Rebs: three players 4 Asts: T. Insfrán, Gómez 2

August 15
14:00

Report

Paraguay	80–91	Chile
Scoring by quarter: 25–23, 18–18, 13–25, 24–25
Pts: Mercado 21; Rebs: Mercado, Cáraves 5 Asts: Cáraves 4		Pts: Morrison 28; Rebs: Morrison 18; Asts: Carrasco, Cousiño 4

August 15
16:00

Report

Peru	48–83	Argentina
Scoring by quarter: 17–11, 4–29, 15–17, 12–26
Pts: Plasencia 11; Rebs: four players 4 Asts: Plasencia 2		Pts: Vega 16; Rebs: Vega 12; Asts: Pavón 5

August 16
14:00

Report

Peru	42–71	Paraguay
Scoring by quarter: 6–19, 12–9, 7–19, 17–24
Pts: Plasencia 9 Rebs: Vega 7 Asts: Plasencia 4		Pts: Aponte 18; Rebs: Peña 10; Asts: Ghiringhelli 6

August 16
18:00

Report

Argentina	74–60	Chile
Scoring by quarter: 17–13, 24–18, 16–15, 17–14
Pts: Thomas 17; Rebs: Boquete 7 Asts: Pavón 5		Pts: Morrison 30; Rebs: Morrison 18; Asts: Fuentes 3

=== Group B ===
Team	Pts	Pld	W	L	PF	PA	PD
Brazil	6	3	3	0	251	144	+107
Venezuela	5	3	2	1	197	183	+14
Ecuador	4	3	1	2	184	180	+4
Uruguay	3	3	0	3	121	246	–125

August 14
16:00

Report

Brazil	84–65	Venezuela
Scoring by quarter: 30–8, 15–28, 26–13, 13–16
Pts: Silvestre 21; Rebs: Cl. dos Santos 14; Asts: da Paixão 5		Pts: Wallen 20; Rebs: Pérez 7 Asts: Pérez 4

August 14
20:00

Report

Ecuador	79–48	Uruguay
Scoring by quarter: 22–9, 20–16, 23–5, 14–18
Pts: Salcedo 21; Rebs: Mora 8 Asts: three players 2		Pts: Pereyra 17; Rebs: Guadalupe 6 Asts: Pereyra 2

August 15
18:00

Report

Uruguay	30–95	Brazil
Scoring by quarter: 4–23, 7–28, 9–26, 10–18
Pts: Pereyra 10; Rebs: three players 6 Asts: Guadalupe, Pereyra 1		Pts: Ribeiro 18; Rebs: Cl. dos Santos 9 Asts: da Paixão 4

August 15
20:00

Report

Venezuela	60–56	Ecuador
Scoring by quarter: 16–8, 16–18, 13–19, 15–11
Pts: Pérez 17; Rebs: Wallen 9 Asts: Márquez 3		Pts: Pazmiño, Salcedo 13; Rebs: Salcedo 12; Asts: Salcedo 4

August 16
16:00

Report

Uruguay	43–72	Venezuela
Scoring by quarter: 11–15, 8–26, 14–13, 10–18
Pts: Pereyra 12; Rebs: Somma 9 Asts: Martinelli, Somma 2		Pts: Wallen 21; Rebs: Wallen 15; Asts: Pérez 3

August 16
20:00

Report

Ecuador	49–72	Brazil
Scoring by quarter: 18–33, 14–7, 5–11, 12–21
Pts: Pazmiño 12; Rebs: Angulo 6 Asts: Salcedo 4		Pts: Cl. dos Santos 24; Rebs: Cl. dos Santos 16; Asts: da Paixão 2

== Classification round ==
Semi-finals
August 17 – Ambato
Paraguay	77
Uruguay	59
August 17 – Ambato
Ecuador	80
Peru	54

Fifth place
August 18 – Ambato
Paraguay	68
Ecuador	71
Seventh place
August 18 – Ambato
Uruguay	70
Peru	57

=== 5th–8th classification ===
August 17
14:00

Report

Paraguay	77–59	Uruguay
Scoring by quarter: 12–15, 25–9, 29–19, 11–16
Pts: Mercado 18; Rebs: Peña 13; Asts: Peralta, Ghiringhelli 2		Pts: Martinelli 19; Rebs: Pereyra 5 Asts: Bello 3

August 17
16:00

Report

Ecuador	80–54	Peru
Scoring by quarter: 18–12, 20–16, 24–14, 18–12
Pts: Salcedo 21; Rebs: Patiño 8 Asts: six players 2		Pts: Plasencia 16; Rebs: Debenedetti 6 Asts: Porras, Farfán 2

=== Seventh place game ===
August 18
14:00

Report

Uruguay	70–57	Peru
Scoring by quarter: 16–12, 14–16, 12–11, 28–18
Pts: Bello 14; Rebs: Pereyra 8 Asts: Pereyra, Somma 5		Pts: Plasencia 19; Rebs: Vega 15; Asts: Plasencia 2

=== Fifth place game ===
August 18
16:00

Report

Paraguay	68–71 (OT)	Ecuador
Scoring by quarter: 19–14, 12–21, 19–17, 11–9, Overtime: 7–10
Pts: Cáraves 14; Rebs: Peña, Mercado 7 Asts: Mercado 3		Pts: Salcedo 23; Rebs: Salcedo 10; Asts: Macías 4

== Final round ==
Semi-finals
August 17 – Ambato
Argentina	75
Venezuela	54
August 17 – Ambato
Brazil	91
Chile	58

Final
August 18 – Ambato
Argentina	47
Brazil	59
Third place
August 18 – Ambato
Venezuela	72
Chile	54

=== Semifinals ===
August 17
18:00

Report

Argentina	75–54	Venezuela
Scoring by quarter: 24–17, 6–19, 21–13, 24–5
Pts: Boquete 29; Rebs: Burani 7 Asts: Rosset 5		Pts: Wallen 17; Rebs: Wallen 7 Asts: Pérez 4

August 17
20:00

Report

Brazil	91–58	Chile
Scoring by quarter: 22–11, 16–18, 28–15, 25–14
Pts: Cl. dos Santos 17; Rebs: Cl. dos Santos 12; Asts: Cl. dos Santos 4		Pts: Morrison 23; Rebs: Morrison 11; Asts: Carrasco 6

=== Third place game ===
August 18
18:00

Report

Venezuela	72–54	Chile
Scoring by quarter: 15–17, 13–9, 18–9, 26–19
Pts: Corrales 26; Rebs: Pérez 8 Asts: Márquez, Pérez 4		Pts: Morrison 36; Rebs: Morrison 13; Asts: Cousiño 3

=== Final ===
August 18
20:00

Report

Argentina	47–59	Brazil
Scoring by quarter: 14–14, 13–14, 13–14, 7–17
Pts: Gretter 16; Rebs: Gretter 9 Asts: Gretter 5		Pts: Silvestre 15; Rebs: Cl. dos Santos 18; Asts: da Paixão 5

== Final standings ==
Rank	Team	Record
1st place, gold medalist(s)	Brazil	5–0
2nd place, silver medalist(s)	Argentina	4–1
3rd place, bronze medalist(s)	Venezuela	3–2
4	Chile	2–3
5	Ecuador	3–2
6	Paraguay	2–3
7	Uruguay	1–4
8	Peru	0–5
