= 2022 South American Basketball Championship for Women =

37th South American Women's Basketball Championship

Tournament details
- Host country: San Luis, Argentina
- Dates: 1–6 August
- Teams: 8 (from 1 confederation)
- Venues: 2 (in 2 host cities)

Final positions
- Champions: Brazil (27th title)
- Runners-up: Argentina
- Third place: Colombia

Official website
- www.fiba.basketball

The 2022 South American Basketball Championship for Women was the 37th edition of the tournament. Eight teams participated in the competition, held at Arena La Pedrera in Villa Mercedes and Estadio Ave Fénix in San Luis, Argentina, from 1 to 6 August 2022.

== Group phase ==
In this round, the teams were drawn into two groups. The first two teams from each group advanced to the semifinals; the other teams advanced to the 5th–8th place playoffs.

All times are local (Argentina Time – UTC-3).

=== Group A ===
Pos	Team	Pld	W	L	PF	PA	PD	Pts	Qualification
1	Argentina	3	3	0	235	122	+113	6	Semifinals
2	Venezuela	3	2	1	199	187	+12	5	Semifinals
3	Paraguay	3	1	2	163	220	−57	4	5th–8th place playoffs
4	Ecuador	3	0	3	132	200	−68	3	5th–8th place playoffs

Source: FIBA

1 August 2022
16:30

Report

Ecuador	52–57	Paraguay
Scoring by quarter: 15–15, 11–18, 10–10, 16–14
Pts: Quiñónez 18; Rebs: Morán 6 Asts: Calderón 3		Pts: Ferrari 22; Rebs: Caraves 14; Asts: Ferrari 4

Arena La Pedrera, Villa Mercedes
Referees: Ramiro Inchauspe (BRA), Aline García (URU), Larissa Rodrigues (BRA)

1 August 2022
20:30

Report

Venezuela	44–79	Argentina
Scoring by quarter: 14–22, 7–17, 13–23, 10–17
Pts: Durán 9 Rebs: Chile 6 Asts: Durán, Fajardo 2		Pts: De la Barba 17; Rebs: Gentinetta 8 Asts: Gretter 5

Arena La Pedrera, Villa Mercedes
Referees: Felipe Ibarra (CHI), Carol García (COL), Gastón Rodríguez (URU)

2 August 2022
16:30

Report

Paraguay	65–76	Venezuela
Scoring by quarter: 8–18, 19–22, 24–17, 14–19
Pts: Ferrari 17; Rebs: Mercado, Peralta 6 Asts: Peralta 4		Pts: Wallen 18; Rebs: Fajardo 12; Asts: Wallen 5

Arena La Pedrera, Villa Mercedes
Referees: Felipe Ibarra (CHI), Gastón Rodríguez (URU), Larissa Rodrigues (BRA)

2 August 2022
20:30

Report

Argentina	64–37	Ecuador
Scoring by quarter: 17–13, 12–5, 22–9, 13–10
Pts: De la Barba 10; Rebs: Cabrera 7 Asts: Gretter 6		Pts: A. Mora 8 Rebs: Garrido 7 Asts: Barreno, M. Mora 1

Arena La Pedrera, Villa Mercedes
Referees: Ramiro Inchauspe (BRA), Aline García (URU), Carol García (COL)

3 August 2022
16:30

Report

Venezuela	79–43	Ecuador
Scoring by quarter: 22–15, 24–12, 10–14, 23–2
Pts: Fajardo 22; Rebs: Márquez 12; Asts: Pérez, Wallen 4		Pts: Calderón 12; Rebs: Salcedo 7 Asts: Lasso 3

Arena La Pedrera, Villa Mercedes
Referees: Aline García (URU), Ramiro Inchauspe (BRA), Gastón Rodríguez (URU)

3 August 2022
20:30

Report

Paraguay	41–92	Argentina
Scoring by quarter: 8–14, 13–27, 6–24, 14–27
Pts: Peralta 9 Rebs: Quevedo 5 Asts: Peralta 3		Pts: De la Barba 15; Rebs: Gentinetta, Mungo 7 Asts: Gretter 9

Arena La Pedrera, Villa Mercedes
Referees: Felipe Ibarra (CHI), Carol García (COL), Larissa Rodrigues (BRA)

=== Group B ===
Pos	Team	Pld	W	L	PF	PA	PD	Pts	Qualification
1	Brazil	3	3	0	278	129	+149	6	Semifinals
2	Colombia	3	2	1	192	168	+24	5	Semifinals
3	Chile	3	1	2	137	219	−82	4	5th–8th place playoffs
4	Uruguay	3	0	3	139	230	−91	3	5th–8th place playoffs

Source: FIBA

1 August 2022
14:30

Report

Chile	55–43	Uruguay
Scoring by quarter: 9–13, 13–6, 11–13, 22–11
Pts: Ovalle 16; Rebs: Cárdenas 13; Asts: three players 2		Pts: Niski 11; Rebs: Somma 18; Asts: Niski, Somma 3

Estadio Ave Fénix, San Luis
Referees: Nicolás Flores (PAR), Romina Morales (ARG), Jassmany Choque (BOL)

1 August 2022
18:30

Report

Brazil	74–45	Colombia
Scoring by quarter: 20–14, 20–7, 20–12, 14–12
Pts: Zabani 12; Rebs: Cardoso 12; Asts: Costa, Gonçalo 5		Pts: Caicedo, Martínez 8 Rebs: Vente 6 Asts: Ríos 5

Estadio Ave Fénix, San Luis
Referees: Daniel García (VEN), Erick Endara (ECU), Franco Anselmo Krivokapich (ARG)

2 August 2022
14:30

Report

Colombia	76–45	Chile
Scoring by quarter: 25–17, 17–13, 15–9, 19–6
Pts: Martínez 17; Rebs: Martínez 11; Asts: Ríos 5		Pts: Ovalle 19; Rebs: Ovalle 8 Asts: Novión 4

Estadio Ave Fénix, San Luis
Referees: Erick Endara (ECU), Romina Morales (ARG), Franco Anselmo Krivokapich (ARG)

2 August 2022
18:30

Report

Uruguay	47–104	Brazil
Scoring by quarter: 14–32, 5–22, 13–26, 15–24
Pts: Niski 10; Rebs: Somma 6 Asts: Kirschenbaum, Talasimov 3		Pts: Cardoso 18; Rebs: Cardoso 9 Asts: Costa 5

Estadio Ave Fénix, San Luis
Referees: Daniel García (VEN), Nicolás Flores (PAR), Jassmany Choque (BOL)

3 August 2022
14:30

Report

Uruguay	49–71	Colombia
Scoring by quarter: 18–16, 13–17, 5–12, 13–26
Pts: Dolinsky, Kirschenbaum 11; Rebs: three players 6 Asts: Somma 5		Pts: Ríos 15; Rebs: Paz 10; Asts: Ríos 6

Estadio Ave Fénix, San Luis
Referees: Daniel García (VEN), Franco Anselmo Krivokapich (ARG), Jassmany Choque (BOL)

3 August 2022
18:30

Report

Brazil	100–37	Chile
Scoring by quarter: 23–4, 32–14, 25–9, 20–10
Pts: Teixeira 18; Rebs: Cardoso 13; Asts: Gonçalo, Paixão 4		Pts: Ovalle 11; Rebs: Cárdenas 8 Asts: Novión 5

Estadio Ave Fénix, San Luis
Referees: Nicolás Flores (PAR), Erick Endara (ECU), Romina Morales (ARG)

== 5th–8th place playoffs ==
5th–8th place semifinals
5 August 2022
Paraguay	62
Uruguay	59
5 August 2022
Chile	61
Ecuador	51

5th place match
6 August 2022
Paraguay	62
Chile	54
7th place match
6 August 2022
Uruguay	61
Ecuador	52

=== 5th–8th place semifinals ===
5 August 2022
14:00

Report

Paraguay	62–59	Uruguay
Scoring by quarter: 19–22, 18–19, 14–7, 11–11
Pts: Ferrari 14; Rebs: Peralta 8 Asts: Mercado 7		Pts: Somma 13; Rebs: Somma 14; Asts: Niski 4

Estadio Ave Fénix, San Luis
Referees: Daniel García (VEN), Romina Morales (ARG), Larissa Rodrigues (BRA)

5 August 2022
16:30

Report

Chile	61–51	Ecuador
Scoring by quarter: 14–20, 24–4, 8–11, 15–16
Pts: Ahumada 15; Rebs: Novión 9 Asts: Novión, Retamales 5		Pts: Salcedo 12; Rebs: M. Mora 11; Asts: Guayaquil 6

Estadio Ave Fénix, San Luis
Referees: Ramiro Inchauspe (BRA), Franco Anselmo Krivokapich (ARG), Carol García (COL)

=== 7th place match ===
6 August 2022
14:00

Report

Uruguay	61–52	Ecuador
Scoring by quarter: 17–9, 10–13, 19–13, 15–17
Pts: Dolinsky 14; Rebs: Somma 15; Asts: Niski 9		Pts: three players 9 Rebs: Morán 10; Asts: Guayaquil, A. Mora 4

Estadio Ave Fénix, San Luis
Referees: Carol García (COL), Franco Anselmo Krivokapich (ARG), Jassmany Choque (BOL)

=== 5th place match ===
6 August 2022
16:30

Report

Paraguay	62–54	Chile
Scoring by quarter: 10–16, 14–11, 23–12, 15–15
Pts: Mercado 22; Rebs: Peralta 11; Asts: Ferrari 7		Pts: Retamales 17; Rebs: Novión 11; Asts: Novión 7

Estadio Ave Fénix, San Luis
Referees: Ramiro Inchauspe (BRA), Aline García (URU), Gastón Rodríguez (URU)

== Championship playoffs ==
Semifinals
5 August 2022
Argentina	71
Colombia	60
5 August 2022
Brazil	105
Venezuela	54

Final
6 August 2022
Argentina	68
Brazil	69
3rd place match
6 August 2022
Colombia	67
Venezuela	63

=== Semifinals ===
5 August 2022
18:30

Report

Brazil	105–54	Venezuela
Scoring by quarter: 26–13, 26–11, 26–13, 27–17
Pts: Gonçalves 21; Rebs: Gonçalves 9 Asts: Gonçalo 6		Pts: Durán 10; Rebs: Chile 7 Asts: Márquez 4

Arena La Pedrera, Villa Mercedes
Referees: Felipe Ibarra (CHI), Erick Endara (ECU), Gastón Rodríguez (URU)

5 August 2022
21:00

Report

Argentina	71–60	Colombia
Scoring by quarter: 14–16, 16–16, 27–16, 14–12
Pts: De la Barba 23; Rebs: Cabrera, Llorente 8 Asts: Gretter 11		Pts: three players 12; Rebs: Ríos 8 Asts: Ríos 5

Arena La Pedrera, Villa Mercedes
Referees: Nicolás Flores (PAR), Aline García (URU), Jassmany Choque (BOL)

=== 3rd place match ===
6 August 2022
18:30

Report

Colombia	67–63 (OT)	Venezuela
Scoring by quarter: 21–12, 11–16, 15–12, 10–17, Overtime: 10–6
Pts: Ríos 21; Rebs: Paz 8 Asts: Muñoz 4		Pts: Wallen 19; Rebs: Pérez 14; Asts: Durán, Pérez 5

Arena La Pedrera, Villa Mercedes
Referees: Nicolás Flores (PAR), Larissa Rodrigues (BRA), Romina Morales (ARG)

=== Final ===
6 August 2022
21:00

Report

Argentina	68–69	Brazil
Scoring by quarter: 20–15, 11–8, 16–23, 21–23
Pts: three players 12; Rebs: Gretter 14; Asts: Gretter 8		Pts: Paixão 17; Rebs: Cardoso 16; Asts: Paixão 4

Arena La Pedrera, Villa Mercedes
Referees: Felipe Ibarra (CHI), Daniel García (VEN), Erick Endara (ECU)

== Final standings ==
Rank	Team	Record
1st place, gold medalist(s)	Brazil	5–0
2nd place, silver medalist(s)	Argentina	4–1
3rd place, bronze medalist(s)	Colombia	3–2
4	Venezuela	2–3
5	Paraguay	3–2
6	Chile	2–3
7	Uruguay	1–4
8	Ecuador	0–5

Qualified for the 2023 FIBA Women's AmeriCup
