= Kamilla Cardoso =

Brazilian basketball player (born 2001)

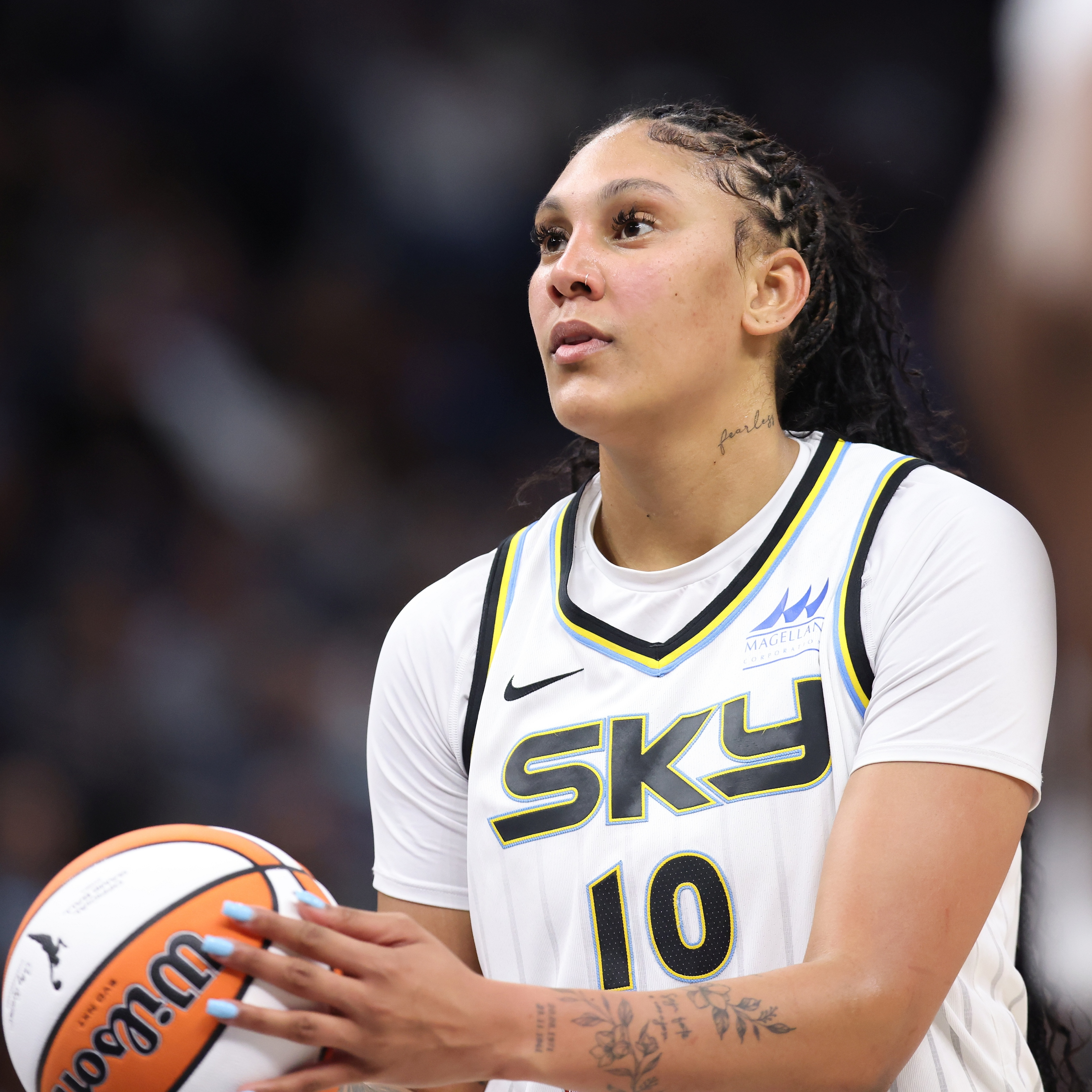
- Cardoso with the Chicago Sky in 2025

No. 10 – Chicago Sky
- Position: Center
- League: WNBA

Personal information
- Born: 30 April 2001 (age 25) Montes Claros, Minas Gerais, Brazil
- Listed height: 6 ft 7 in (2.01 m)
- Listed weight: 215 lb (98 kg)

Career information
- High school: Hamilton Heights Christian Academy (Chattanooga, Tennessee)
- College: Syracuse (2020–2021); South Carolina (2021–2024)
- WNBA draft: 2024: 1st round, 3rd overall pick
- Drafted by: Chicago Sky
- Playing career: 2024–present

Career history
- 2024–present: Chicago Sky
- 2024–2025: Shanghai Swordfish
- 2025–2026: Guangdong Vermilion Birds

Career highlights
- WCBA International Player of the Year (2025); WNBA All-Rookie Team (2024); 2× NCAA Champion (2022, 2024); NCAA Tournament MOP (2024); WBCA Coaches' All-American (2024); Second-team All-American – AP (2024); First-team All-American – USBWA (2024); WBCA Defensive Player of the Year (2024); First-team All-SEC (2024); SEC Defensive Player of the Year (2024); SEC All-Defensive Team (2024); SEC Sixth Woman of the Year (2023); Second-team All-SEC (2023); FIBA AmeriCup MVP (2023); South American Championship MVP (2022); First-team All-ACC – Media (2021); Second-team All-ACC – Coaches (2021); ACC co-Defensive Player of the Year (2021); ACC Rookie of the Year – Media (2021); ACC All-Defensive Team (2021); ACC All-Freshman Team (2021); McDonald's All-American (2020)
- Stats at Basketball Reference
Medals
Women's basketball
Representing Brazil
FIBA AmeriCup
Gold medal – first place	2023 Mexico
Silver medal – second place	2025 Chile
Bronze medal – third place	2021 Puerto Rico
South American Championship
Gold medal – first place	2022 Argentina	Team

Kamilla Soares Cardoso (born 30 April 2001) is a Brazilian professional basketball player for the Chicago Sky of the Women's National Basketball Association (WNBA) and the Guangdong Vermilion Birds of the Women's Chinese Basketball Association (WCBA). She played college basketball at Syracuse and South Carolina. She won two national championships with South Carolina in 2022 and 2024, and was named NCAA Tournament MOP in 2024. Cardoso was selected third overall in the 2024 WNBA draft by the Chicago Sky.

== Early life ==
A native of Montes Claros, Brazil, Cardoso played high school basketball for Hamilton Heights Christian Academy in Chattanooga, Tennessee. As a senior, she averaged 24.1 points, 15.8 rebounds and 9.2 blocks per game. Cardoso was selected to play in the McDonald's All-American Game and the Jordan Brand Classic. Rated a five-star recruit and the number five player in her class by ESPN, she committed to playing college basketball for Syracuse over offers from UConn, Ohio State, Mississippi State and South Carolina. She was the highest-rated recruit in program history.

== College career ==
As a freshman at Syracuse, Cardoso was the team's starting center and averaged 13.6 points, eight rebounds and 2.7 blocks per game, becoming the first player in program history to win the Atlantic Coast Conference (ACC) Freshman of the Year award. She shared ACC Defensive Player of the Year honors from the league's coaches with Lorela Cubaj and was named first-team All-ACC by the Blue Ribbon Panel. Following the season, Cardoso transferred to South Carolina. As a sophomore, she was a reserve for Aliyah Boston, averaging 5.4 points and 5.1 rebounds per game and helping her team win the national championship. In her junior season, Cardoso averaged 9.8 points and 8.5 rebounds per game off the bench. She was named Southeastern Conference (SEC) Sixth Woman of the Year and second-team All-SEC.

On 7 April 2024, Cardoso was named the NCAA basketball tournament Most Outstanding Player following a dominant 15-point, 17-rebound performance in her team's 2024 national championship win. Cardoso graduated shortly after the 2024 WNBA draft, having majored in psychology.

== Professional career ==
=== WNBA ===
==== Chicago Sky (2024–present) ====
Cardoso was selected 3rd overall in the 2024 WNBA draft by the Chicago Sky. In her first pre-season game against the Minnesota Lynx, Cardoso suffered a shoulder injury that caused her to miss the first six games of the 2024 WNBA season. She made her debut on 1 June, posting 11 points and 6 rebounds off the bench in 18 minutes in a 70–71 loss to the Indiana Fever. After the Sky starting center Elizabeth Williams suffered a season-ending knee injury, Cardoso was slotted into the starting lineup. On 8 June, she made her debut as a starter and recorded 13 points and 5 rebounds in 21 minutes in a 71–80 loss to the Atlanta Dream. Cardoso's season ended prematurely as she re-aggravated her shoulder injury and did not play in the last two games. In her rookie season, Cardoso averaged 9.8 points, 7.9 rebounds and 1.4 blocks, and ranked second in the league (behind teammate Angel Reese) in offensive rebounds per game at 3.0. After the season, she was named to the WNBA All-Rookie Team.

In the 2025 season, Cardoso appeared in 40 games, starting 39. On 24 June, she scored a career-high 27 points in a 97–86 win against the Los Angeles Sparks. She then missed the next four games to join Brazil for the 2025 FIBA Women's AmeriCup. Overall, in her second season, she averaged 13.6 points, 8.5 rebounds, and 2.5 assists per game (all career-highs).

=== Overseas ===
Cardoso signed with the Shanghai Swordfish of the Women's Chinese Basketball Association (WCBA) for the 2024–25 season. She was awarded the International Player of the Year for the 2025 season.

Cardoso signed with the Guangdong Vermilion Birds of the WCBA for the 2025–26 season.

== National team career ==
Cardoso represented Brazil at the 2021 FIBA Women's AmeriCup in Puerto Rico. She averaged 9.9 points and eight rebounds per game, helping her team win the bronze medal.

Cardoso won a gold medal and earned MVP honors at the 2022 South American Basketball Championship in Argentina. She averaged 14.8 points, 11.4 rebounds and 2.6 blocks per game in the tournament.

Cardoso led Brazil to a gold medal at the 2023 FIBA Women's AmeriCup in Mexico, where she was named tournament MVP and averaged 10.9 points and 8.3 rebounds per game. She recorded 20 points and 11 rebounds in a 69–58 win against the United States in the final.

Cardoso rejoined the national team as they sought a spot in the 2024 Summer Olympics through a qualifying tournament held in the Brazilian city of Belém. During the decisive game against Germany, Cardoso was fouled out after an altercation with Satou Sabally, leading to four free throws that led to a German win and Brazil's elimination. She was still chosen for the tournament's all-star team, with averages of 15.3 points and 11 rebounds.

Cardoso was a silver medalist at the 2025 FIBA Women's AmeriCup, where fouls reduced her play time in the final against the United States to just 18 minutes, and was chosen to the all-star team, having led the tournament in efficiency, field goal percentage, rebounds, and blocks, and ranking fifth in points per game with 14.9.

== Career statistics ==
Legend
GP	Games played	GS	Games started	MPG	Minutes per game	RPG	Rebounds per game
APG	Assists per game	SPG	Steals per game	BPG	Blocks per game	PPG	Points per game
TO	Turnovers per game	FG%	Field-goal percentage	3P%	3-point field-goal percentage	FT%	Free-throw percentage
**Bold**	Career best	°	League leader

*	Denotes season(s) in which Cardoso won an NCAA Championship

=== WNBA ===
==== Regular season ====
Stats current through end of 2026 regular season

WNBA regular season statistics
Year	Team	GP	GS	MPG	FG%	3P%	FT%	RPG	APG	SPG	BPG	TO	PPG
2024	Chicago	32	29	27.4	.521	.000	.726	7.9	1.7	0.5	1.4	**1.5**	9.8
2025	Chicago	40	39	**27.6**	.528	**.500**	.724	8.5	**2.5**	0.4	1.2	2.4	13.6
2026	Chicago	**43**	**43**	26.5	**.551**	.000	**.740**	**8.6**	**2.5**	**0.6**	**1.5**	1.8	**14.7**
**Career**	3 years, 1 team	115	111	27.1	.536	.000	.731	8.4	2.2	0.5	1.4	1.9	12.9

=== College ===
NCAA statistics
Year	Team	GP	GS	MPG	FG%	3P%	FT%	RPG	APG	SPG	BPG	TO	PPG
2020–21	Syracuse	24	23	23.5	.576	.000	.602	8.0	0.7	**0.6**	**2.7**	1.8	13.6
2021–22*	South Carolina	32	0	13.3	.553	—	**.717**	5.1	1.0	0.3	1.4	1.2	5.4
2022–23	South Carolina	**36**	0	18.8	.559	—	.694	8.5	0.9	0.4	1.9	**1.1**	9.8
2023–24*	South Carolina	33	**32**	**25.3**	**.594**	**1.000**	.659	**9.7**	**2.0**	**0.6**	2.5	1.5	**14.4**
**Career**		125	55	20.0	.575	.500	.662	7.9	1.2	0.5	2.1	1.4	10.6

== Off the court ==
=== In popular culture ===
In March 2024, ESPN+ announced their new original docuseries, Full Court Press would premiere in May 2024. The series (from Peyton Manning's Omaha Productions and Words & Pictures) followed Cardoso, Iowa's Caitlin Clark, and UCLA's Kiki Rice throughout their 2023-24 season and postseason.
