= 2021 FIBA Women's AmeriCup =

Tournament details
- Host country: Puerto Rico
- City: San Juan
- Dates: 11–19 June
- Teams: 10 (from 1 confederation)
- Venue: 1 (in 1 host city)

Final positions
- Champions: United States (4th title)
- Runners-up: Puerto Rico
- Third place: Brazil
- Fourth place: Canada

Tournament statistics
- Games played: 26
- MVP: (United States) Rhyne Howard
- Top scorer: (Puerto Rico) Jennifer O'Neill (16.8 ppg)

Official website
- Website

The 2021 FIBA Women's AmeriCup was the 16th edition of the FIBA Women's AmeriCup, which is the main tournament for senior women's basketball national teams of the FIBA Americas. It was held from 11 to 19 June 2021. On 20 March 2021, Puerto Rico was confirmed as the host. The top four teams qualify for one of the qualifying tournaments for the 2022 FIBA Women's Basketball World Cup.

The United States won their fourth title by defeating Puerto Rico in the final, 74–59.

== Qualification ==
Qualification	Host	Dates	Vacancies	Qualified
Automated entry			2	Canada; United States
2021 Centrobasket Women	(El Salvador) San Salvador	24–28 March 2021	4	Dominican Republic; El Salvador; Puerto Rico; Virgin Islands
2021 South American Championship	Cancelled		4	Argentina; Brazil; Colombia; Venezuela

== Draw ==
The draw took place on 22 May 2021.

=== Seeding ===
Pair 1	Pair 2	Pair 3	Pair 4	Pair 5
United States; Canada	Brazil; Puerto Rico	Argentina; Colombia	Virgin Islands; Dominican Republic	Venezuela; El Salvador

== Squads ==
Each team consisted of 12 players.

== Preliminary round ==
All times are local (UTC−4).

=== Group A ===
Pos	Team	Pld	W	L	PF	PA	PD	Pts	Qualification
1	Canada	4	4	0	344	189	+155	8	Quarterfinals
2	Brazil	4	3	1	341	226	+115	7	Quarterfinals
3	Colombia	4	2	2	260	280	−20	6	Quarterfinals
4	Virgin Islands	4	1	3	242	294	−52	5	Quarterfinals
5	El Salvador	4	0	4	195	393	−198	4	

Source: FIBA
Rules for classification: 1) Points; 2) Head-to-head results; 3) Points difference; 4) Points scored.

11 June 2021
12:10

Boxscore

Virgin Islands	60–72	Colombia
Scoring by quarter: 12–18, 16–21, 13–21, 19–12
Pts: George 18; Rebs: Tate 14; Asts: Bough 6		Pts: Arias 19; Rebs: Arias, Mosquera 10; Asts: Ríos 6

Roberto Clemente Coliseum, San Juan
Referees: Roberto Vázquez (PUR), Virginia Peruchini (ARG), Johnny Batista (USA)

11 June 2021
18:10

Boxscore

Brazil	118–43	El Salvador
Scoring by quarter: 28–11, 27–7, 33–11, 30–14
Pts: T. Silva 22; Rebs: T. Silva 13; Asts: Gonçalo 7		Pts: Villalobos 11; Rebs: Noyola, Vega 6 Asts: Funes 2

Roberto Clemente Coliseum, San Juan
Referees: Fabricio Vito (ARG), Alexis Mercado (PUR), Ashley Gilpin (USA)

12 June 2021
12:10

Boxscore

Canada	101–41	Virgin Islands
Scoring by quarter: 27–7, 21–6, 16–12, 37–16
Pts: Pellington 16; Rebs: Alexander 10; Asts: Konig 6		Pts: George 11; Rebs: Tate 7 Asts: Bough 3

Roberto Clemente Coliseum, San Juan
Referees: Ashley Gilpin (USA), Alexis Mercado (PUR), Rebeca Davila (PUR)

12 June 2021
15:10

Boxscore

Colombia	56–79	Brazil
Scoring by quarter: 8–16, 20–11, 12–25, 16–27
Pts: Ríos 18; Rebs: Paz, Ríos 5 Asts: Ríos 4		Pts: Paixão 17; Rebs: De Souza 11; Asts: Paixão 4

Roberto Clemente Coliseum, San Juan
Referees: Roberto Vázquez (PUR), Virginia Peruchini (ARG), Johnny Batista (USA)

13 June 2021
12:10

Boxscore

El Salvador	67–92	Colombia
Scoring by quarter: 20–16, 22–28, 16–30, 9–18
Pts: Tévez 20; Rebs: Villalobos 11; Asts: Murcia 4		Pts: Arias 18; Rebs: Ríos 8 Asts: Arias 7

Roberto Clemente Coliseum, San Juan
Referees: Alexis Mercado (PUR), Fabricio Vito (ARG), Aline García (URU)

13 June 2021
15:10

Boxscore

Brazil	67–71	Canada
Scoring by quarter: 21–21, 16–24, 22–13, 8–13
Pts: Dos Santos 21; Rebs: De Souza 12; Asts: four players 2		Pts: Fields 17; Rebs: Alexander 7 Asts: Pellington 3

Roberto Clemente Coliseum, San Juan
Referees: Ashley Gilpin (USA), Johnny Batista (USA), Yuliet Méndez (CUB)

14 June 2021
12:10

Boxscore

Canada	98–41	El Salvador
Scoring by quarter: 20–10, 22–2, 27–17, 29–12
Pts: Pellington 21; Rebs: Amihere 9 Asts: Hill 5		Pts: Funes 14; Rebs: Hernández, Funes 3 Asts: Funes, Méndez 3

Roberto Clemente Coliseum, San Juan
Referees: Ashley Gilpin (USA), Yuliet Méndez (CUB), Aline García (URU)

14 June 2021
15:10

Boxscore

Virgin Islands	56–77	Brazil
Scoring by quarter: 10–25, 15–16, 16–18, 15–18
Pts: Day 17; Rebs: Tate 8 Asts: Tate 9		Pts: K. Silva 17; Rebs: K. Silva 11; Asts: Carvalho, Gonçalo 4

Roberto Clemente Coliseum, San Juan
Referees: Roberto Vázquez (PUR), Fabricio Vito (ARG), Rebeca Davila (PUR)

15 June 2021
12:10

Boxscore

El Salvador	44–85	Virgin Islands
Scoring by quarter: 16–19, 12–23, 6–20, 10–23
Pts: Tévez 14; Rebs: Tévez 7 Asts: Funes 4		Pts: George 22; Rebs: Day 16; Asts: Bough 7

Roberto Clemente Coliseum, San Juan
Referees: Roberto Vázquez (PUR), Fabricio Vito (ARG), Norval Young (IVB)

15 June 2021
15:10

Boxscore

Colombia	40–74	Canada
Scoring by quarter: 9–17, 12–17, 12–19, 7–21
Pts: Arias 9 Rebs: Mosquera 9 Asts: Mosquera 3		Pts: Alexander 14; Rebs: Alexander 9 Asts: Ayim, Scott 4

Roberto Clemente Coliseum, San Juan
Referees: Ashley Gilpin (USA), Johnny Batista (USA), Aline García (URU)

=== Group B ===
Pos	Team	Pld	W	L	PF	PA	PD	Pts	Qualification
1	United States	3	3	0	291	157	+134	6	Quarterfinals
2	Puerto Rico (H)	3	2	1	232	191	+41	5	Quarterfinals
3	Venezuela	3	1	2	159	258	−99	4	Quarterfinals
4	Dominican Republic	3	0	3	180	256	−76	3	Quarterfinals
5	Argentina (Note: Argentina was disqualified after several members of the delegation were tested positive to COVID-19. Their remaining two games were abandoned and were lost by forfeit. All previous results of games played were nullified.)	0	0	0	0	0	0	0	Disqualified

Source: FIBA
Rules for classification: 1) Points; 2) Head-to-head results; 3) Points difference; 4) Points scored.
(H) Hosts
Notes:

11 June 2021
15:10

Boxscore

Dominican Republic	46–64	Argentina
Scoring by quarter: 9–16, 12–15, 18–16, 7–17
Pts: Colomé 13; Rebs: Evangelista 10; Asts: Monsac 3		Pts: Rosset 14; Rebs: Cabrera 12; Asts: Rosset 6

Roberto Clemente Coliseum, San Juan
Referees: Andreia Silva (BRA), José Fernández (CRC), Yuliet Méndez (CUB)

11 June 2021
21:10

Boxscore

Puerto Rico	88–50	Venezuela
Scoring by quarter: 23–9, 29–14, 22–7, 14–20
Pts: Gwathmey 14; Rebs: Gibson 9 Asts: Rosado 8		Pts: Marcano 13; Rebs: Wallen 8 Asts: Díaz 4

Roberto Clemente Coliseum, San Juan
Referees: Julio Anaya (PAN), Felipe Ibarra (CHI), Carol García (COL)

12 June 2021
18:10

Boxscore

United States	102–39	Dominican Republic
Scoring by quarter: 25–17, 22–6, 20–2, 35–14
Pts: Henderson 17; Rebs: Boston 9 Asts: Henderson 5		Pts: Colomé 11; Rebs: Arias 5 Asts: Morton 2

Roberto Clemente Coliseum, San Juan
Referees: Fabricio Vito (ARG), Julio Anaya (PAN), Norval Young (IVB)

12 June 2021
21:10

Boxscore

Argentina	56–79	Puerto Rico
Scoring by quarter: 8–23, 17–28, 20–18, 11–10
Pts: Gauna 13; Rebs: Castro 8 Asts: Rosset 3		Pts: O'Neill 20; Rebs: Quiñones 8 Asts: O'Neill, Rosado 5

Roberto Clemente Coliseum, San Juan
Referees: Andreia Silva (BRA), Maria Comodaro (BRA), Aline García (URU)

13 June 2021
15:10

Venezuela	20–0	Argentina (Note: Due to inconclusive COVID-19 testing results by the Argentine delegation, the game was initially postponed. FIBA later announced this game was marked a forfeit.)

Roberto Clemente Coliseum, San Juan

13 June 2021
21:10

Boxscore

Puerto Rico	65–87	United States
Scoring by quarter: 23–18, 10–25, 12–25, 20–19
Pts: O'Neill 20; Rebs: Quiñones 8 Asts: Salamán 4		Pts: Hillmon, Howard 17; Rebs: Hillmon 11; Asts: four players 3

Roberto Clemente Coliseum, San Juan
Referees: José Fernández (CRC), Felipe Ibarra (CHI), Norval Young (IVB)

14 June 2021
18:10

Boxscore

United States	102–53	Venezuela
Scoring by quarter: 23–18, 33–11, 25–16, 21–8
Pts: Prince 19; Rebs: Cunane 9 Asts: Burton 6		Pts: Wallen 18; Rebs: Pérez 6 Asts: Pérez 5

Roberto Clemente Coliseum, San Juan
Referees: José Fernández (CRC), Maria Comodaro (BRA), Carol García (COL)

14 June 2021
21:10

Boxscore

Dominican Republic	54–79	Puerto Rico
Scoring by quarter: 12–29, 12–18, 18–16, 12–16
Pts: Morton 12; Rebs: Reynoso 10; Asts: Monsac, Morton 4		Pts: Meléndez 18; Rebs: Quiñones 10; Asts: Salamán 7

Roberto Clemente Coliseum, San Juan
Referees: Andreia Silva (BRA), Felipe Ibarra (CHI), Norval Young (IVB)

15 June 2021
18:10

Boxscore

Venezuela	77–66	Dominican Republic
Scoring by quarter: 20–11, 17–19, 20–11, 20–25
Pts: Corrales, Wallen 19; Rebs: Fajardo 12; Asts: Pérez 6		Pts: Morton 13; Rebs: Arias 11; Asts: Morton 6

Roberto Clemente Coliseum, San Juan
Referees: Julio Anaya (PAN), Maria Comodaro (BRA), Yuliet Méndez (CUB)

15 June 2021
21:10

Argentina	0–20	United States

Roberto Clemente Coliseum, San Juan

== Knockout stage ==
=== Bracket ===
Quarter-finals
17 June
Canada	90
Dominican Republic	53
17 June
Puerto Rico	77
Colombia	69
17 June
United States	97
Virgin Islands	46
17 June
Brazil	90
Venezuela	59

Semi-finals
18 June
Canada	61
Puerto Rico	65
18 June
United States	71
Brazil	60

Final
19 June
United States	74
Puerto Rico	59
Third place
19 June
Canada	82
Brazil	87

=== Quarterfinals ===
17 June 2021
12:10

Boxscore

United States	97–46	Virgin Islands
Scoring by quarter: 24–10, 22–15, 25–12, 26–9
Pts: Hillmon 17; Rebs: Jones 9 Asts: Henderson 8		Pts: Tate 18; Rebs: Tate 7 Asts: Bough, Richards 1

Roberto Clemente Coliseum, San Juan
Referees: Alexis Mercado (PUR), Johnny Batista (PUR), Yuliet Méndez (CUB)

17 June 2021
15:10

Boxscore

Canada	90–53	Dominican Republic
Scoring by quarter: 22–15, 28–20, 27–9, 13–9
Pts: Konig 23; Rebs: Amihere 11; Asts: Fields 5		Pts: Morton 18; Rebs: Evangelista, Monsac 4 Asts: Monsac, Soto 3

Roberto Clemente Coliseum, San Juan
Referees: Julio Anaya (PAN), Norval Young (IVB), Aline García (URU)

17 June 2021
18:10

Boxscore

Brazil	90–59	Venezuela
Scoring by quarter: 20–8, 29–10, 22–26, 19–15
Pts: T. Silva 15; Rebs: K. Silva 9 Asts: Gonçalo 4		Pts: Rivera 15; Rebs: Pérez 12; Asts: Pérez 7

Roberto Clemente Coliseum, San Juan
Referees: Felipe Ibarra (CHI), Fabricio Vito (ARG), José Fernández (CRC)

17 June 2021
21:10

Boxscore

Puerto Rico	77–69	Colombia
Scoring by quarter: 12–23, 20–7, 25–22, 20–17
Pts: Gwathmey 29; Rebs: Rosado, Quiñones 8 Asts: Rosado 4		Pts: Mosquera 21; Rebs: Mosquera 15; Asts: Ríos 13

Roberto Clemente Coliseum, San Juan
Referees: Andreia Silva (BRA), Virginia Peruchini (ARG), Maria Comodaro (BRA)

=== Semifinals ===
18 June 2021
18:10

Boxscore

United States	71–60	Brazil
Scoring by quarter: 13–21, 12–12, 25–10, 21–17
Pts: Cunane 19; Rebs: Cunane, Hillmon-Baker 8 Asts: Burton 6		Pts: T. Silva 14; Rebs: K. Silva 10; Asts: Gonçalo 3

Roberto Clemente Coliseum, San Juan
Referees: Fabricio Vito (ARG), José Fernández (CRC), Norval Young (IVB)

18 June 2021
21:10

Boxscore

Canada	61–65	Puerto Rico
Scoring by quarter: 13–17, 21–17, 14–16, 13–15
Pts: Fields 14; Rebs: Amihere 11; Asts: Colley, Konig 3		Pts: Gwathmey 17; Rebs: Rosado 7 Asts: three players 4

Roberto Clemente Coliseum, San Juan
Referees: Felipe Ibarra (CHI), Julio Anaya (PAN), Virginia Peruchini (ARG)

=== Third place game ===
19 June 2021
18:10

Boxscore

Canada	82–87 (OT)	Brazil
Scoring by quarter: 16–16, 18–13, 9–29, 25–10, Overtime: 14–19
Pts: Amihere 22; Rebs: Amihere 11; Asts: Konig 8		Pts: Paixão, Dos Santos 19; Rebs: De Souza 10; Asts: Paixão 7

Roberto Clemente Coliseum, San Juan
Referees: Roberto Vázquez (PUR), Fabricio Vito (ARG), Ashley Gilpin (USA)

=== Final ===
19 June 2021
21:10

Boxscore

Puerto Rico	59–74	United States
Scoring by quarter: 21–17, 15–17, 11–21, 12–19
Pts: O'Neill 18; Rebs: Rosado 8 Asts: O'Neill 5		Pts: Howard 22; Rebs: Boston 19; Asts: Burton, Howard 5

Roberto Clemente Coliseum, San Juan
Referees: Felipe Ibarra (CHI), Julio Anaya (PAN), Andreia Silva (BRA)

== Final standing ==
Qualified for World Cup Qualifying Tournaments

Rank	Team	Record
1st place, gold medalist(s)	United States	6–0
2nd place, silver medalist(s)	Puerto Rico	4–2
3rd place, bronze medalist(s)	Brazil	5–2
4	Canada	5–2
5	Colombia	2–3
6	Venezuela	1–3
7	Dominican Republic	0–4
8	Virgin Islands	1–4
9	El Salvador	0–4
DQ	Argentina	0–0

== Statistics and awards ==
=== Statistical leaders ===
==== Players ====
Points

Name	PPG
(Puerto Rico) Jennifer O'Neill	16.8
(Puerto Rico) Jazmon Gwathmey	15.8
(Colombia) Yaneth Arias	15.0
(Venezuela) Daniela Wallen	14.8
(United States Virgin Islands) Anisha George	14.0

Rebounds

Name	RPG
(United States) Aliyah Boston	9.3
(Brazil) Érika de Souza	8.9
(Colombia) Narlyn Mosquera	8.8
(United States Virgin Islands) Natalie Day	8.2
(United States Virgin Islands) Imani Tate	8.2

Assists

Name	APG
(Colombia) Manuela Ríos	5.8
(Venezuela) Waleska Pérez	4.5
(United States Virgin Islands) Lanese Bough	4.4
(Puerto Rico) Dayshalee Salamán	4.0
(United States) Veronica Burton	4.0

Blocks

Name	BPG
(Puerto Rico) Jazmon Gwathmey	2.0
(United States Virgin Islands) Anisha George	2.0
(United States) Aliyah Boston	1.8
(Brazil) Kamilla Silva	1.6
(Dominican Republic) Giocelis Reynoso	1.5

Steals

Name	SPG
(Venezuela) Daniela Wallen	3.3
(Brazil) Thayná Silva	2.4
(United States Virgin Islands) Imani Tate	2.4
(Dominican Republic) Yohanna Morton	2.3
(Colombia) Manuela Ríos	1.8
(El Salvador) Kimberly Villalobos	1.8

Efficiency

Name	EFF
(United States) Aliyah Boston	20.5
(Colombia) Yaneth Arias	17.4
(Puerto Rico) Jazmon Gwathmey	17.3
(United States) Elissa Cunane	16.3
(Colombia) Manuela Ríos	16.2

==== Teams ====
Points

Team	PPG
United States	88.8
Canada	86.0
Brazil	82.6
Puerto Rico	73.6
Colombia	65.8

Rebounds

Team	RPG
United States	57.8
Canada	48.0
Brazil	46.9
Virgin Islands	43.8
Puerto Rico	42.2

Assists

Team	APG
United States	23.2
Canada	21.2
Brazil	21.1
Puerto Rico	19.8
Colombia	16.0

Blocks

Team	BPG
United States	5.5
Puerto Rico	5.2
Virgin Islands	4.4
Dominican Republic	3.3
Brazil	3.1

Steals

Team	SPG
Brazil	10.7
United States	10.0
Canada	9.7
Venezuela	8.3
Puerto Rico	7.8

Efficiency

Team	EFF
United States	119.0
Canada	104.0
Brazil	99.9
Puerto Rico	88.2
Colombia	68.8

=== Awards ===
The awards were announced on 20 June 2021.

All-Star Team
Guard	Forwards	Centers
(Colombia) Manuela Ríos (Puerto Rico) Jennifer O'Neill (United States) Rhyne Howard	(Brazil) Clarissa dos Santos	(United States) Elissa Cunane
MVP: (United States) Rhyne Howard
