= FIBA Women's AmeriCup Most Valuable Player =

Prestigious sporting award

The FIBA Women's AmeriCup Most Valuable Player Award is a FIBA award given every two years, to the Most Outstanding player throughout the tournament.

== Winners ==
	Denotes player whose team won that years tournament
	Denotes player inducted into the FIBA Hall of Fame
	Denotes player who is still active
Player (X)	Denotes the number of times the player had been named MVP at that time
Team (X)	Denotes the number of times a player from this team had won at that time

Year	Player	Position	Team	Ref.
2007	Yaquelín Plutín	Center	Cuba	
2009	Adriana Moisés Pinto	Guard	Brazil	
2011	Érika de Souza	Center	Brazil	
2013	Yamara Amargo	Forward	Cuba	
2015	Kia Nurse	Guard	Canada	
2017	Nirra Fields	Guard	Canada	
2019	Sylvia Fowles	Center	United States	
2021	Rhyne Howard	Guard	United States	
2023	Kamilla Soares	Center	Brazil	
2025	Mikayla Blakes	Guard	United States	

== See also ==
- FIBA Women's AmeriCup All-Tournament Team
- FIBA Women's Basketball World Cup Most Valuable Player
- FIBA Women's Basketball World Cup All-Tournament Team
- FIBA Awards
