= 2023 FIBA Women's AmeriCup =

Basketball tournament

Tournament details
- Host country: Mexico
- City: León
- Dates: 1–9 July
- Teams: 10 (from 1 confederation)
- Venue: 1 (in 1 host city)

Final positions
- Champions: Brazil (6th title)
- Runners-up: United States
- Third place: Canada
- Fourth place: Puerto Rico

Tournament statistics
- Games played: 28
- MVP: (Brazil) Kamilla Cardoso
- Top scorer: (Venezuela) Daniela Wallen (21.0 ppg)

Official website
- Website

The 2023 FIBA Women's AmeriCup was the 17th edition of the FIBA Women's AmeriCup, which is the main tournament for senior women's basketball national teams of the FIBA Americas. It was held from 1 to 9 July 2023 in León, Mexico.

Brazil won their sixth title after a finals win over the United States.

== Format ==
The ten teams were split into two groups of five teams. The top four teams per group qualified to the quarterfinals. A first-placed team faced off against the fourth-placed team and a second-placed team against a third-placed team. A knockout-system was used after the preliminary round.

== Qualification ==
Qualification	Host	Dates	Vacancies	Qualified
Automated entry			2	Canada; United States
2022 South American Championship	(Argentina) San Luis	1–6 August 2022	4	Brazil; Argentina; Colombia; Venezuela
2022 Centrobasket Women	(Mexico) Chihuahua	23–27 November 2022	4	Puerto Rico; Mexico; Cuba; Dominican Republic

== Draw ==
The draw took place on 10 May 2023 in Miami, United States.

=== Seeding ===
The teams were seeded according to the FIBA Women's World Ranking.

Pair 1	Pair 2	Pair 3	Pair 4	Pair 5
United States; Canada	Puerto Rico; Brazil	Argentina; Colombia	Dominican Republic; Cuba	Venezuela; Mexico

== Squads ==
Each nation had to submit a list of 12 players.

== Preliminary round ==
All times are local (UTC−6).

=== Group A ===
Pos	Team	Pld	W	L	PF	PA	PD	Pts	Qualification
1	Brazil	4	4	0	305	238	+67	8	Quarterfinals
2	United States	4	3	1	305	221	+84	7	Quarterfinals
3	Venezuela	4	1	3	292	313	−21	5 (Note: Venezuela 1–1, +19 PD; Argentina 1–1, –1 PD; Cuba 1–1, –18 PD)	Quarterfinals
4	Argentina	4	1	3	232	243	−11	5	Quarterfinals
5	Cuba	4	1	3	248	367	−119	5	

Source: FIBA
Rules for classification: 1) Points; 2) Head-to-head results; 3) Points difference; 4) Points scored.
Notes:

1 July 2023
12:10

Boxscore

Brazil	92–53	Cuba
Scoring by quarter: 29–14, 20–17, 19–16, 24–6
Pts: Gonçalves 16; Rebs: Cardoso 8 Asts: Gonçalo 7		Pts: Amargo 13; Rebs: Vargas 10; Asts: Armentero, Vargas 2

Domo de la Feria, Leon
Referees: José Fernández (CRC), Carmelo de la Rosa (PUR), Kelsey Kisilevich (CAN)

1 July 2023
14:40

Boxscore

United States	80–54	Venezuela
Scoring by quarter: 20–5, 26–11, 20–14, 14–24
Pts: Jackson, Reese 11; Rebs: Marshall 14; Asts: Kelly, Marshall 4		Pts: Wallen 14; Rebs: Pérez, Wallen 4 Asts: Pérez 7

Domo de la Feria, Leon
Referees: Felipe Ibarra (CHI), Norval Young (IVB), Juan Valenzuela (MEX)

2 July 2023
12:10

Boxscore

Venezuela	76–90	Brazil
Scoring by quarter: 18–23, 18–23, 21–15, 19–29
Pts: Wallen 20; Rebs: Pérez 7 Asts: Durán 5		Pts: Dantas 17; Rebs: Cardoso 15; Asts: Paixão 5

Domo de la Feria, Leon
Referees: Alexis Mercado (PUR), Kelsey Kisilevich (CAN), Aline García (URU)

2 July 2023
14:40

Boxscore

Argentina	56–65	United States
Scoring by quarter: 18–19, 11–14, 11–16, 16–16
Pts: Boquete 16; Rebs: Gretter 9 Asts: Gretter 9		Pts: Jackson 17; Rebs: Reese 15; Asts: Kelly 4

Domo de la Feria, Leon
Referees: Felipe Ibarra (CHI), José Fernández (CRC), Orlando Varela (HON)

3 July 2023
12:10

Boxscore

Cuba	85–106 (OT)	Venezuela
Scoring by quarter: 21–23, 21–14, 21–13, 13–26, Overtime: 9–30
Pts: Amargo 18; Rebs: Vargas 10; Asts: Armentero 9		Pts: Wallen 34; Rebs: Wallen 12; Asts: Pérez 12

Domo de la Feria, Leon
Referees: Kelsey Kisilevich (CAN), Norval Young (IVB), Aline García (URU)

3 July 2023
14:40

Boxscore

Brazil	56–55	Argentina
Scoring by quarter: 9–14, 20–12, 21–15, 6–14
Pts: Dantas 13; Rebs: De Souza 10; Asts: Paixão 4		Pts: Boquete 14; Rebs: Gentinetta, Gretter 7 Asts: Gretter 4

Domo de la Feria, Leon
Referees: Alexis Mercado (PUR), Orlando Varela (HON), Carmelo de la Rosa (PUR)

4 July 2023
12:10

Boxscore

Argentina	63–66	Cuba
Scoring by quarter: 11–17, 17–13, 17–16, 18–20
Pts: Boquete 21; Rebs: Gretter 9 Asts: Gretter 7		Pts: Amargo 25; Rebs: Vargas 10; Asts: Montero, Tanis 3

Domo de la Feria, Leon
Referees: Carmelo de la Rosa (PUR), Norval Young (IVB), Alexis Mercado (PUR)

4 July 2023
14:40

Boxscore

United States	54–67	Brazil
Scoring by quarter: 12–15, 13–20, 14–14, 15–18
Pts: Betts 11; Rebs: Betts 15; Asts: Osborne 2		Pts: Paixão 23; Rebs: De Souza 7 Asts: three players 3

Domo de la Feria, Leon
Referees: Kelsey Kisilevich (CAN), José Fernández (CRC), Aline García (URU)

5 July 2023
12:10

Boxscore

Cuba	44–106	United States
Scoring by quarter: 14–27, 4–33, 10–23, 16–23
Pts: Tanis 10; Rebs: Vargas 7 Asts: Despaigne 2		Pts: Betts 17; Rebs: Betts, Reese 14; Asts: Kelly 7

Domo de la Feria, Leon
Referees: Orlando Varela (HON), Felipe Ibarra (CHI), José Fernández (CRC)

5 July 2023
17:40

Boxscore

Venezuela	56–58	Argentina
Scoring by quarter: 16–23, 13–12, 16–9, 11–14
Pts: Pérez, Wallen 14; Rebs: Márquez, Wallen 7 Asts: Durán, Márquez 4		Pts: Chagas 16; Rebs: Gretter 9 Asts: Gretter 9

Domo de la Feria, Leon
Referees: Krishna Domínguez (MEX), Kelsey Kisilevich (CAN), Aline García (URU)

=== Group B ===
Pos	Team	Pld	W	L	PF	PA	PD	Pts	Qualification
1	Canada	4	4	0	344	207	+137	8	Quarterfinals
2	Puerto Rico	4	3	1	253	257	−4	7	Quarterfinals
3	Colombia	4	2	2	246	250	−4	6	Quarterfinals
4	Mexico (H)	4	1	3	232	274	−42	5	Quarterfinals
5	Dominican Republic	4	0	4	213	300	−87	4	

Source: FIBA
Rules for classification: 1) Points; 2) Head-to-head results; 3) Points difference; 4) Points scored.
(H) Hosts

1 July 2023
17:40

Boxscore

Puerto Rico	63–62	Colombia
Scoring by quarter: 10–19, 17–21, 22–11, 14–11
Pts: Gwathmey 20; Rebs: Gwathmey 8 Asts: Guirantes 5		Pts: Muñoz 14; Rebs: González 9 Asts: López, Martínez 7

Domo de la Feria, Leon
Referees: Juan Fernández (ARG), Orlando Varela (HON), Larissa Rodrigues (BRA)

1 July 2023
20:40

Boxscore

Mexico	69–62	Dominican Republic
Scoring by quarter: 14–19, 20–11, 14–17, 21–15
Pts: Payán 15; Rebs: Ramos 7 Asts: Beltrán 8		Pts: Martínez 18; Rebs: Martínez 9 Asts: Martínez 4

Domo de la Feria, Leon
Referees: Ashley Gloss (USA), Fernando Leite (BRA), Franco Anselmo (ARG)

2 July 2023
17:40

Boxscore

Dominican Republic	47–73	Puerto Rico
Scoring by quarter: 11–22, 13–17, 15–14, 8–20
Pts: Capellán 12; Rebs: De los Santos 8 Asts: Jiménez 5		Pts: Guirantes 16; Rebs: Hollingshed 13; Asts: Guirantes 4

Domo de la Feria, Leon
Referees: Juan Fernández (ARG), Larissa Rodrigues (BRA), Franco Anselmo (ARG)

2 July 2023
20:10

Boxscore

Canada	83–57	Mexico
Scoring by quarter: 23–7, 11–14, 27–14, 22–22
Pts: Colley 19; Rebs: Alexander 18; Asts: Colley 4		Pts: Payán 10; Rebs: Luna, Ramos 6 Asts: Gallegos 3

Domo de la Feria, Leon
Referees: Ashley Gloss (USA), Fernando Leite (BRA), Micaela Prado (ARG)

3 July 2023
17:40

Boxscore

Colombia	70–56	Dominican Republic
Scoring by quarter: 14–7, 25–13, 13–14, 18–22
Pts: Muñoz 23; Rebs: Paz 9 Asts: Martínez, Muñoz 4		Pts: Capellan 14; Rebs: A. Jiménez 8 Asts: Evangelista 4

Domo de la Feria, Leon
Referees: Ashley Gloss (USA), Larissa Rodrigues (BRA), Leydys Castellón (CUB)

3 July 2023
20:10

Boxscore

Puerto Rico	47–84	Canada
Scoring by quarter: 16–19, 12–15, 14–25, 5–25
Pts: Hollingshed, O'Neill 10; Rebs: Hollingshed 8 Asts: San Antonio 5		Pts: Edwards 14; Rebs: Alexander 13; Asts: Colley, Edwards 5

Domo de la Feria, Leon
Referees: Juan Fernández (ARG), Fernando Leite (BRA), Franco Anselmo (ARG)

4 July 2023
17:40

Boxscore

Canada	89–55	Colombia
Scoring by quarter: 22–14, 25–19, 23–9, 19–13
Pts: Fields 15; Rebs: Alexander 10; Asts: Edwards, Prosper 4		Pts: Delgado 22; Rebs: Paz 9 Asts: López 3

Domo de la Feria, Leon
Referees: Juan Fernández (ARG), Ashley Gloss (USA), Leydys Castellón (CUB)

4 July 2023
20:10

Boxscore

Mexico	64–70	Puerto Rico
Scoring by quarter: 15–17, 17–17, 23–17, 9–19
Pts: Ramos 18; Rebs: Luna 7 Asts: Beltrán 7		Pts: Guirantes 25; Rebs: Guirantes 10; Asts: Guirantes 5

Domo de la Feria, Leon
Referees: Orlando Varela (HON), Felipe Ibarra (CHI), Micaela Prado (ARG)

5 July 2023
14:40

Boxscore

Dominican Republic	48–88	Canada
Scoring by quarter: 7–22, 18–19, 10–23, 13–24
Pts: Jiménez 13; Rebs: De los Santos 5 Asts: De los Santos 3		Pts: Prosper 13; Rebs: Alexander 11; Asts: three players 4

Domo de la Feria, Leon
Referees: Ashley Gloss (USA), Micaela Prado (ARG), Larissa Rodrigues (BRA)

5 July 2023
20:10

Boxscore

Colombia	59–42	Mexico
Scoring by quarter: 9–13, 17–13, 20–6, 13–10
Pts: Muñoz 17; Rebs: Muñoz 8 Asts: Rios 5		Pts: Beltrán 12; Rebs: Ramos 7 Asts: Ramos 5

Domo de la Feria, Leon
Referees: Fernando Leite (BRA), Franco Anselmo (ARG), Leydys Castellón (CUB)

== Knockout stage ==
=== Bracket ===
Quarter-finals
7 July
Brazil	83
Mexico	61
7 July
Puerto Rico (OT)	89
Venezuela	86
7 July
Canada	68
Argentina	60
7 July
United States	68
Colombia	49

Semi-finals
8 July
Brazil	85
Puerto Rico	74
8 July
Canada	63
United States	67

Final
9 July
Brazil	69
United States	58
Third place
9 July
Puerto Rico	73
Canada	80

=== Quarterfinals ===
7 July 2023
12:10

Boxscore

United States	68–49	Colombia
Scoring by quarter: 23–11, 20–18, 10–12, 15–8
Pts: Betts 16; Rebs: Reese 18; Asts: Osborne 4		Pts: Rios 12; Rebs: Rios 8 Asts: Rios 6

Domo de la Feria, Leon
Referees: Fernando Leite (BRA), José Fernández (CRC), Aline García (URU)

7 July 2023
14:40

Boxscore

Puerto Rico	89–86 (OT)	Venezuela
Scoring by quarter: 22–17, 22–18, 20–23, 15–21, Overtime: 10–7
Pts: Guirantes 29; Rebs: Guirantes 8 Asts: three players 3		Pts: Durán 24; Rebs: Wallen 10; Asts: Pérez 5

Domo de la Feria, Leon
Referees: Kristian Paez (ECU), Kelsey Kisilevich (CAN), Felipe Ibarra (CHI)

7 July 2023
17:40

Boxscore

Canada	68–60	Argentina
Scoring by quarter: 18–20, 20–10, 16–21, 14–9
Pts: Fields 22; Rebs: Edwards 16; Asts: Colley 7		Pts: Mungo 12; Rebs: Chagas 6 Asts: Chagas 3

Domo de la Feria, Leon
Referees: Daniel García (VEN), Krishna Domínguez (MEX), Orlando Varela (HON)

7 July 2023
20:10

Boxscore

Brazil	83–61	Mexico
Scoring by quarter: 19–18, 19–15, 23–8, 22–20
Pts: Monteiro 14; Rebs: Paixão 13; Asts: Paixão 4		Pts: Gallegos, Luna 12; Rebs: Ramos 8 Asts: Ramírez 6

Domo de la Feria, Leon
Referees: Juan Fernández (ARG), Micaela Prado (ARG), Leydys Castellón (CUB)

=== Semifinals ===
8 July 2023
17:40

Boxscore

Brazil	85–74	Puerto Rico
Scoring by quarter: 16–22, 23–20, 23–18, 23–14
Pts: Dantas 24; Rebs: three players 5 Asts: three players 4		Pts: Guirantes 22; Rebs: Guirantes, O'Neill 5 Asts: Guirantes, O'Neill 4

Domo de la Feria, Leon
Referees: Daniel García (VEN), Krishna Domínguez (MEX), Orlando Varela (HON)

8 July 2023
20:10

Boxscore

Canada	63–67	United States
Scoring by quarter: 17–22, 12–17, 21–15, 13–13
Pts: Alexander 17; Rebs: Edwards 11; Asts: Colley, Edwards 3		Pts: Betts 12; Rebs: Reese 13; Asts: Johnson 3

Domo de la Feria, Leon
Referees: Juan Fernández (ARG), Kristian Paez (ECU), Franco Anselmo (ARG)

=== Third place game ===
9 July 2023
15:30

Boxscore

Puerto Rico	73–80	Canada
Scoring by quarter: 17–22, 20–16, 21–26, 15–16
Pts: Guirantes 27; Rebs: Hollingshed 8 Asts: Guirantes 5		Pts: Fields 19; Rebs: Alexander 19; Asts: Hill 5

Domo de la Feria, Leon
Referees: Krishna Domínguez (MEX), Felipe Ibarra (CHI), Micaela Prado (ARG)

=== Final ===
9 July 2023
18:30

Boxscore

Brazil	69–58	United States
Scoring by quarter: 14–16, 21–21, 25–10, 9–11
Pts: Cardoso 20; Rebs: Cardoso 11; Asts: Paixão 5		Pts: Jackson 22; Rebs: Betts 11; Asts: Osborne 4

Domo de la Feria, Leon
Referees: Daniel García (VEN), Juan Fernández (ARG), Kelsey Kisilevich (CAN)

== Final standings ==
Rank	Team	Record
1st place, gold medalist(s)	Brazil	7–0
2nd place, silver medalist(s)	United States	5–2
3rd place, bronze medalist(s)	Canada	6–1
4	Puerto Rico	4–3
5	Colombia	2–3
6	Venezuela	1–4
7	Argentina	1–4
8	Mexico	1–4
9	Cuba	1–3
10	Dominican Republic	0–4

Qualified for the 2024 FIBA Women's Olympic Qualifying Tournaments
Qualified for the FIBA Americas Women's Olympic Pre-Qualifying Tournament

== Statistics and awards ==
=== Statistical leaders ===
==== Players ====
Points

Name	PPG
(Venezuela) Daniela Wallen	21.0
(Puerto Rico) Arella Guirantes	20.4
(Cuba) Yamara Amargo	15.3
(United States) Rickea Jackson	14.6
(Canada) Nirra Fields	14.4

Rebounds

Name	RPG
(Canada) Kayla Alexander	12.3
(United States) Angel Reese	11.1
(United States) Lauren Betts	10.9
(Cuba) Nahomis Vargas	9.3
(Brazil) Kamilla Cardoso	8.3

Assists

Name	APG
(Argentina) Melisa Gretter	6.0
(Venezuela) Waleska Pérez	6.0
(Mexico) Paola Beltrán	4.8
(Colombia) Manuela Rios	4.2
(Brazil) Tainá Paixão	4.1

Blocks

Name	BPG
(Colombia) Yuliany Paz	3.2
(United States) Lauren Betts	2.1
(Argentina) Agostina Burani	1.4
(Mexico) Jacqueline Luna	1.2
(Venezuela) Ivaney Marquez	1.2

Steals

Name	SPG
(Venezuela) Daniela Wallen	3.6
(Venezuela) Waleska Pérez	2.8
(Venezuela) Mariana Durán	2.4
(Canada) Nirra Fields	2.3
(Colombia) Manuela Rios	2.2

Efficiency

Name	EFFPG
(Venezuela) Daniela Wallen	24.8
(Puerto Rico) Arella Guirantes	21.6
(United States) Lauren Betts	20.1
(Canada) Kayla Alexander	18.7
(Brazil) Kamilla Cardoso	16.7

==== Teams ====
Points

Team	PPG
Canada	79.3
Brazil	77.4
Venezuela	75.6
United States	71.1
Puerto Rico	69.9

Rebounds

Team	RPG
United States	57.0
Canada	52.1
Cuba	43.5
Brazil	43.3
Mexico	42.8

Assists

Team	APG
Brazil	19.6
Canada	19.6
Venezuela	19.6
Mexico	14.8
Argentina	14.6
United States	14.6

Blocks

Team	BPG
United States	5.9
Colombia	4.8
Canada	4.3
Mexico	4.2
Puerto Rico	4.1

Steals

Team	SPG
Venezuela	13.2
Colombia	10.2
Canada	10.1
Dominican Republic	8.8
Puerto Rico	7.4

Efficiency

Team	EFFPG
Canada	95.3
Brazil	91.1
United States	81.9
Venezuela	77.4
Puerto Rico	67.7

=== Awards ===
The awards were announced on 9 July 2023.

All-Tournament Team
Guards	Forwards	Center
(Puerto Rico) Arella Guirantes	(Brazil) Damiris Dantas (United States) Rickea Jackson	(Brazil) Kamilla Cardoso (Canada) Kayla Alexander
MVP: (Brazil) Kamilla Cardoso
