= Satou Sabally =

German-American basketball player (born 1998)

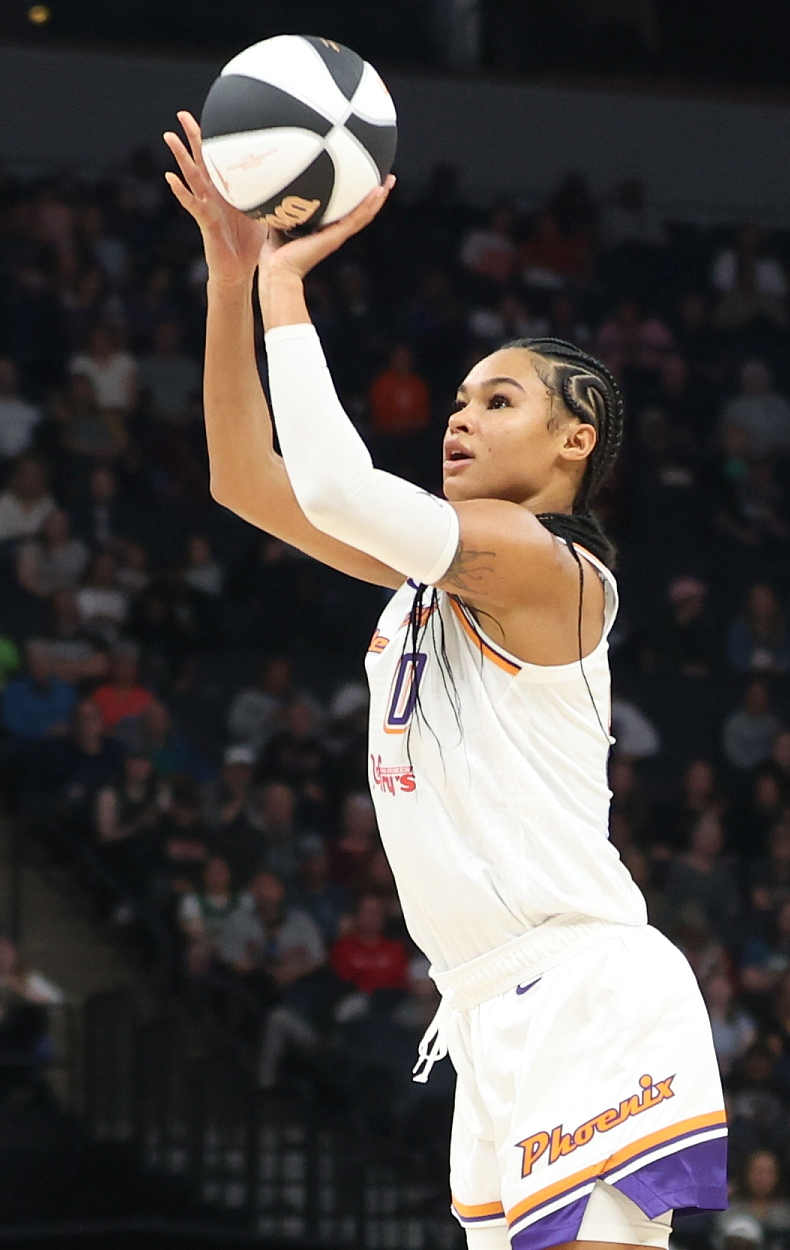
- Sabally with the Phoenix Mercury in 2025

No. 0 – New York Liberty
- Position: Small forward
- League: WNBA

Personal information
- Born: April 25, 1998 (age 28) New York City, New York, U.S.
- Listed height: 6 ft 4 in (1.93 m)
- Listed weight: 175 lb (79 kg)

Career information
- High school: Rotteck Gymnasium (Freiburg, Germany)
- College: Oregon (2017–2020)
- WNBA draft: 2020: 1st round, 2nd overall pick
- Drafted by: Dallas Wings
- Playing career: 2020–present

Career history
- 2020–2024: Dallas Wings
- 2020–2023: Fenerbahçe
- 2023: Shandong Six Stars
- 2025–present: Phantom BC
- 2025: Phoenix Mercury
- 2026–present: New York Liberty

Career highlights
- WNBA Commissioner's Cup Champion (2026); 3× WNBA All-Star (2021, 2023, 2025); All-WNBA First Team (2023); WNBA Most Improved Player (2023); WNBA All-Rookie Team (2020); EuroLeague champion (2023); 3× Turkish Super League champion (2021–2023); All-EuroLeague First Team (2022); Cheryl Miller Award (2020); WBCA Coaches' All-American (2020); Second-team All-American – AP, USBWA (2020); 2× All Pac-12 (2019, 2020); Pac-12 Freshman of the Year (2018); Pac-12 All-Freshman Team (2018)
- Stats at Basketball Reference

Isatou "Satou" Sabally (born April 25, 1998) is a German-American professional basketball player for the New York Liberty of the Women's National Basketball Association (WNBA) and for the Laces of Unrivaled. She started playing as an amateur in the German second division, and later in the 1. Damen-Basketball-Bundesliga. Retaining her NCAA eligibility, she moved to the US in 2017 and played college basketball for the Oregon Ducks. During her three years with Oregon, Sabally contributed to the Ducks winning three regular-season and two tournament Pac-12 championships, and reaching their first-ever NCAA tournament Final Four in 2019. After her junior season, she entered the 2020 WNBA draft and was selected second overall by the Dallas Wings. Sabally spent five seasons with the Wings, winning the WNBA Most Improved Player Award and earning an All-WNBA First Team nomination in 2023, and becoming a two-time All-Star (2021, 2023). In 2025, she was traded to the Phoenix Mercury.

Sabally has represented the senior German national team since 2019. She helped Germany qualify to the 2024 Olympic tournament, the first-ever appearance for the women's basketball team.

== Early life ==
Sabally was born in New York City to a Gambian father, Jerreh, and a German mother, Heike, and is the third of seven children. Her given name of Isatou is that of her father's sister; according to Sabally, the name is derived from that of Aisha, one of the wives of the Islamic prophet Muhammad. While Gambian tradition normally calls for a family's oldest daughter to receive an aunt's name, she was so named despite not being the oldest daughter. The family moved to Gambia when she was 2 years old, and then moved to Berlin when she was preparing to start school. She was discovered by a local coach as a 9-year-old at a playground and began regularly attending practices. She was the only girl on her first youth team.

In 2012, Sabally joined the Berlin basketball club TuS Lichterfelde of the 2. Damen-Basketball-Bundesliga, and played there until 2015. After her sophomore year of high school, she moved from Berlin to attend the Rotteck Gymnasium in Freiburg. She then joined the professional team Eisvögel USC Freiburg of the 1. Damen-Basketball-Bundesliga and played there from 2015 to 2017. However, in order to keep her NCAA eligibility, she did not take a salary and retained her amateur status.

Sabally played in the 2017 Jordan Brand Classic, being the first international player to play in the girls' game.

== College career ==
=== 2017–18: Freshman season ===
During her first year at Oregon, Sabally appeared in every game for the Ducks while averaging 10.7 points and 3.8 rebounds per game. She was named to the Pac-12 all-Freshman team and Pac-12 Freshman of the Year. Oregon won the Pac-12 regular-season title as well as, for the first time in school history, the Pac-12 Tournament championship. In the NCAA tournament, they advanced to the Elite Eight, where they lost to the eventual champions, Notre Dame.

=== 2018–19: Sophomore season ===
In her second season, Sabally started all 38 games and was the third most efficient player in NCAA. Oregon won their second straight Pac-12 regular-season title, and made their first-ever Final Four in the NCAA tournament, where they lost to Baylor. Following the season, Sabally was named to the Pac-12 team, an honorable mention All-American by the WBCA, and to the watchlist for both the Naismith Trophy and Wade Trophy.

=== 2019–20: Junior season ===
In her junior season, Sabally started in 29 games, missing three in November due to her obligations with the Germany national team. However, she still played in the November 9, 2019, exhibition against the United States women's national basketball team, where her 25 points helped Oregon secure a 93–86 victory. Oregon became only the second college squad in history to beat the US national team. Despite having one remaining season of college eligibility, Sabally announced in February 2020 that she would enter the 2020 WNBA draft; she was draft-eligible because she reached the league's minimum age of 22 (Note: The collective bargaining agreement between the WNBA and its players' union specifies a minimum age of draft eligibility as 20 for "international players" and 22 for other players, measured as of December 31 of the draft year. The WNBA's definition of "international players" specifically excludes those born in the US and those who have played US college basketball. US-born players are subject to the 22-year age limit even if they have never played basketball in the country.) shortly after the April draft. Oregon won their third straight Pac-12 regular-season title as well as the Pac-12 Tournament championship and was ranked No. 2 with a 31–2 record when the season was prematurely ended due to the COVID-19 pandemic. Following the season, Sabally won the Cheryl Miller Award for the best small forward in the country, was named to the watchlist for both the Naismith Trophy and Wade Trophy, was named to the Pac-12 team, and was a consensus all-American (WBCA First-Team All-America, AP and USBWA Second-Team All-America). She finished her college career at No. 7 on the Oregon all-time scoring list with 1,508 career points.

== Professional career ==
=== WNBA ===
==== Dallas Wings (2020–2024) ====
Sabally was selected as the second overall pick in the 2020 WNBA draft by the Dallas Wings. In her rookie season, which was played in the Wubble, a back issue and concussion limited her to 16 of 22 regular-season games. At the end of the season, she was named to the 2020 WNBA All-Rookie Team.

In her second season, Sabally missed the first six regular-season games while playing in the 2021 FIBA 3x3 Women's Olympic Qualifying Tournament with Germany. Her performance after her return earned her a nomination to the 2021 WNBA All-Star Game. However, Sabally missed most of the games after the Olympic break due to nagging Achilles soreness, and she ended up playing in only 17 of 32 regular-season games. The Wings made the playoffs as the seventh seed, but lost in the first round to the eventual champions, the Chicago Sky.

Sabally played in only 11 regular-season games in the 2022 WNBA season, initially missing games due to a late arrival from her season with Fenerbahçe, and later due to knee and ankle injuries. The Wings finished with a .500 or better record for the first time since relocating to Dallas and made the 2022 WNBA Playoffs as the sixth seed. They faced the third-seeded Connecticut Sun in the first round of the playoffs and won their first playoff game as a franchise since 2009, but eventually lost the series 1–2. Sabally, having missed the last 13 games of the regular season, returned for the playoffs but did not start any of the games and averaged only 15 minutes off the bench.

After struggling with injuries through her first three seasons, which limited her to only 44 appearances, Sabally had a breakthrough year in the 2023 WNBA season. She started 38 games, achieved career-high averages in points, rebounds, assists and steals, was named a 2023 WNBA All-Star Game starter, won the WNBA Most Improved Player Award, and finished fifth in the WNBA Most Valuable Player Award voting. On June 11, in a game against the New York Liberty, Sabally played against her sister Nyara for the first time in their careers. They became the fifth set of sisters to play against each other in WNBA history. On June 13, she earned her first career WNBA Player of the Week honor. On July 28, in a 90–62 win over the Washington Mystics, Sabally recorded the second triple-double in Wings franchise history (and first since relocating to Dallas) with 14 points, 11 rebounds, and 10 assists. Sabally led the Wings to their first winning record since relocating to Dallas, earning them the fourth seed in the 2023 WNBA Playoffs. The Wings defeated the Atlanta Dream 2–0 in the first round and made their first franchise WNBA semifinal since 2009. They lost 0–3 in the semifinal to the eventual champions, the Las Vegas Aces.

With her rookie contract expiring after the 2023 season, Sabally became a restricted free agent. In January 2024, Sabally signed a one-year deal with the Wings worth $195,000, taking slightly less money than she was eligible for in order to help the team's chances. However, Sabally missed the first 25 games of the 2024 WNBA season due to a shoulder injury sustained on national team duty. Dallas, plagued with injuries to other players as well, struggled in her absence. Sabally started in all 15 games for the Wings after the Olympic break and posted new career-highs in assists and three-point field goal percentage, but it was a disappointing season for the team, which finished 11th with a 9–31 record.

On January 9, 2025, Sabally announced that she had already played her last game in Dallas and would be seeking a new team. Set to become an unrestricted free agent, she received the core designation from the Wings, granting them exclusive negotiating rights with her. Both sides then worked together to find a suitable trade.

==== Phoenix Mercury (2025) ====
On February 2, 2025, a four-team trade among the Dallas Wings, Connecticut Sun, Indiana Fever, and Phoenix Mercury was finalized. The deal sent Sabally and her Wings teammates Kalani Brown and Sevgi Uzun to the Mercury, along with perennial All-Star Alyssa Thomas from the Sun. Due to being originally cored by the Wings, Sabally was eligible for supermax money, but she signed a one-year contract worth $215,000. In her debut—an 81–59 win over the Seattle Storm—Sabally scored 27 points, setting a new record for the most points scored by a Mercury player in their team debut.

During the 2025 WNBA season, Satou Sabally was named an All-Star starter for the third time, although she missed the game due to an ankle injury. Sabally was also an advocate for player rights and criticized the league's CBA proposal and the demanding 44-game schedule, citing player safety concerns. Despite her injury, she contributed to the Mercury securing the No. 4 playoff seed, where they faced the defending champion New York Liberty in the first round. In October, she was diagnosed with a concussion and ruled out of Game 4 of the WNBA Finals. She was hurt as she fell going after a rebound. Her head made contact with the leg of Kierstan Bell.

==== New York Liberty (2026–present) ====
On April 11, 2026, Sabally joined the New York Liberty, signing as a free agent. Sabally left the New York Liberty's June 23 game against Las Vegas with a concussion. On August 14, head coach Chris DeMarco announced that Sabally would be stepping away from the team to recover from her second head injury in 12 months.

=== Overseas ===
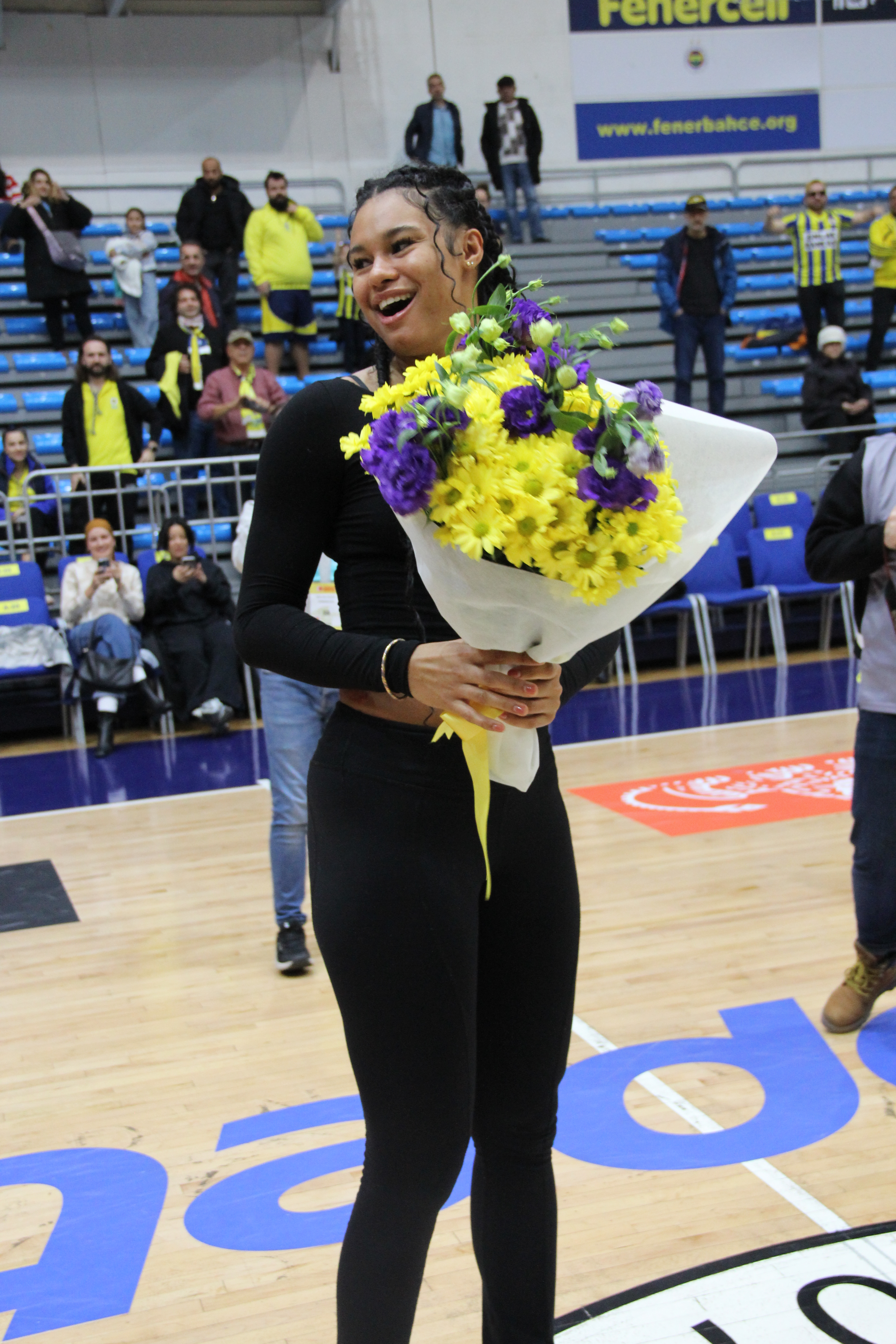
Sabally visiting Fenerbahçe in 2024. She played for the Turkish team from 2020 to 2023.

==== Fenerbahçe (2020–2023) ====
Sabally spent her first three WNBA off-seasons (2020–2023) with Fenerbahçe. She won the Women's Basketball Super League with the team three times, including an undefeated run in the 2020–2021 season. With Sabally, Fenerbahçe also finished third in the 2020–21 EuroLeague Women, second in the 2021–22 EuroLeague Women, and finally won the 2022–23 EuroLeague Women. Sabally was named to the All-EuroLeague Women Second Team in 2020–2021 and the All-EuroLeague Women First Team in 2021–2022.

==== Shandong (2023) ====
In October–December 2023, Sabally played for the Shandong Six Stars of the Women's Chinese Basketball Association (WCBA).

=== Unrivaled ===
On August 19, 2024, it was announced that Sabally would appear and play in the inaugural season of Unrivaled, a new women's 3-on-3 basketball league founded by Napheesa Collier and Breanna Stewart. She was assigned to Phantom, reuniting with her former Oregon teammate Sabrina Ionescu. In the 2025 Unrivaled season, Sabally played in all 14 games, starting 13, and averaged 15.3 points, 5.6 rebounds, and 1.9 assists per game.

== National team career ==
=== U16 ===
Sabally played for the German U-16 team in the 2013 FIBA Europe Under-16 Championship for Women Division B, where Germany finished 12th. Sabally averaged 6.3 points, 11.4 rebounds, and 2.1 assists per game. The next year, she helped Germany win the 2014 FIBA Europe Under-16 Championship for Women Division B and earn a promotion to Division A. Sabally averaged 13.4 points, 8.4 rebounds, and 3.9 assists per game and was named MVP of the tournament.

=== U18 ===
Sabally played for the German U-18 team in the 2015 FIBA Europe Under-18 Championship for Women Division B, where Germany finished in 5th place. She averaged 13.4 points, 8.4 rebounds, and 3.9 assists per game.

=== U20 ===
Sabally played for the German U-20 team in the 2017 FIBA U20 Women's European Championship Division B, leading the team to gold medals and promotion to Division A. She averaged 16.9 points, 7.1 rebounds, 3.1 assists, and 2.4 steals per game, and was named MVP of the tournament. In the following year's 2018 FIBA U20 Women's European Championship, she led the tournament in both points (20.7) and rebounds (10.0) per game and was named to the All-Star Five, as Germany finished 9th.

=== Senior national team ===
Sabally played for the Germany women's national 3x3 team at the 2019 European Games in Minsk. In May 2021, she participated in the 2021 FIBA 3x3 Women's Olympic Qualifying Tournament, where Germany finished 10th and failed to qualify.

Sabally played for the senior Germany women's national basketball team in the EuroBasket Women 2021 qualification. She appeared in two games in November 2019, against North Macedonia (later declared void) and Croatia, where she was the top scorer in both. Sabally returned to the national team in November 2023 for the first two games of the EuroBasket Women 2025 qualification. The first game of the qualification, a win against Czechia, was the first time Satou played together with her sister Nyara in the senior national team.

In February 2024, Sabally played in the Olympic Qualifying Tournament in Belém. She suffered a shoulder injury during the first game, a surprising victory over Serbia, and did not play in the second game, a loss to Australia. She returned to the lineup for the final decisive game against Brazil, where she was named Player of the Game as Germany secured the win and qualified to the Olympic tournament for the first time. Right after the qualification tournament, Sabally underwent surgery to repair her shoulder injury, ruling her out of the pre-Olympic part of the 2024 WNBA season.

Sabally returned to play at the Paris Olympic tournament, helping the German team reach the quarterfinals in their first Olympic appearance. In the opening game of the group stage, Germany secured their first-ever Olympic win, defeating the reigning European champions Belgium 83–69, with Sabally leading her team in scoring with 17 points. In the second game against Japan, Sabally scored 33 points, the eighth-highest point tally in the history of women's Olympic tournaments. Sabally struggled in the quarterfinal loss to France, 71–84, shooting 2-for-10 from the field and committing 7 turnovers. Nonetheless, she was named to the All-Second Team of the tournament, averaging 18.8 points, 5.8 rebounds, and 2.0 assists over four games.

== Player profile ==
Sabally is a versatile forward who offers an unusual combination of ball-handling, shooting skills, and size, which earned her the nickname "Unicorn". Sabally's play has drawn comparisons to the men's basketball player Kristaps Porziņģis, who has been given the same nickname and popularized the term "unicorn" in basketball. Sabally's idiosyncratic playing style has also been compared to her compatriot Dirk Nowitzki.

Sabally also named Maya Moore, Skylar Diggins, and Candace Parker as her basketball inspirations.

== Career statistics ==
Legend
| GP | Games played | GS | Games started | MPG | Minutes per game | RPG | Rebounds per game |
| APG | Assists per game | SPG | Steals per game | BPG | Blocks per game | PPG | Points per game |
| TO | Turnovers per game | FG% | Field-goal percentage | 3P% | 3-point field-goal percentage | FT% | Free-throw percentage |
| **Bold** | Career best | ° | League leader |

=== WNBA ===
==== Regular season ====
WNBA regular season statistics
| Year | Team | GP | GS | MPG | FG% | 3P% | FT% | RPG | APG | SPG | BPG | TO | PPG |
|---|---|---|---|---|---|---|---|---|---|---|---|---|---|
| 2020 | Dallas | 16 | 14 | 28.1 | .368 | .197 | .872 | 7.8 | 2.5 | .9 | **.9** | 2.2 | 13.9 |
| 2021 | Dallas | 17 | 14 | 24.9 | .418 | .327 | .770 | 5.9 | 2.8 | .2 | .8 | 2.3 | 11.9 |
| 2022 | Dallas | 11 | 6 | 21.7 | .398 | .233 | **.914** | 4.8 | 2.1 | .5 | .2 | 2.3 | 11.3 |
| 2023 | Dallas | 38 | 38 | 33.1 | .435 | .361 | .874 | **8.1** | 4.4 | **1.8** | .4 | 2.9 | **18.6** |
| 2024 | Dallas | 15 | 15 | **34.1** | .426 | **.452** | .779 | 6.4 | **5.0** | 1.3 | .5 | 2.5 | 17.9 |
| 2025 | Phoenix | **39** | **39** | 26.6 | .404 | .321 | .827 | 5.9 | 2.5 | 1.3 | .3 | 2.0 | 16.3 |
| 2026 | New York | 13 | 5 | 16.8 | **.459** | .385 | .862 | 2.8 | 1.9 | .1 | .2 | **1.7** | 10.4 |
| **Career** | 7 years, 3 teams | 149 | 131 | 27.8 | .416 | .335 | .843 | 6.4 | 3.2 | 1.1 | .5 | 2.3 | 15.4 |
| **Career** | All-Star | 2 | 1 | 15.0 | .474 | .111 | — | 5.5 | 1.0 | .5 | .0 | 2.0 | 9.5 |

==== Playoffs ====
WNBA playoff statistics
| Year | Team | GP | GS | MPG | FG% | 3P% | FT% | RPG | APG | SPG | BPG | TO | PPG |
|---|---|---|---|---|---|---|---|---|---|---|---|---|---|
| 2021 | Dallas | 1 | 0 | 22.0 | **.500** | .000 | .667 | 4.0 | 1.0 | **2.0** | 1.0 | 2.0 | 12.0 |
| 2022 | Dallas | 3 | 0 | 15.3 | .333 | .300 | .800 | 1.3 | 3.0 | .0 | .3 | **.7** | 7.0 |
| 2023 | Dallas | 5 | 5 | **33.6** | .359 | **.391** | .778 | 5.2 | **4.2** | 1.4 | **1.2** | 3.0 | 15.8 |
| 2025 | Phoenix | **10** | **10** | 32.6 | .399 | .333 | **.867** | **7.0** | 2.5 | 1.1 | .2 | 2.2 | **19.0** |
| **Career** | 4 years, 2 teams | 19 | 15 | 29.6 | .385 | .343 | .837 | 5.5 | 2.9 | 1.1 | .5 | 2.2 | 15.9 |

=== College ===
NCAA statistics
| Year | Team | GP | GS | MPG | FG% | 3P% | FT% | RPG | APG | SPG | BPG | TO | PPG |
|---|---|---|---|---|---|---|---|---|---|---|---|---|---|
| 2017–18 | Oregon | **38** | 29 | 24.1 | .461 | .370 | .787 | 3.8 | 1.8 | 1.0 | .7 | 2.0 | 10.7 |
| 2018–19 | Oregon | **38** | **38** | **30.4** | **.505** | **.411** | .734 | 6.2 | 2.0 | **1.4** | **.9** | **1.9** | **16.6** |
| 2019–20 | Oregon | 29 | 29 | 28.8 | .464 | .338 | **.792** | **6.9** | **2.3** | 1.0 | .4 | 2.2 | 16.2 |
| **Career** | | 105 | 96 | 27.7 | .480 | .378 | .770 | 5.6 | 2.0 | 1.2 | .7 | 2.0 | 14.4 |

== Off the court ==
=== Personal life ===
Satou's younger sister, Nyara, is also a professional basketball player. Nyara entered the University of Oregon a year after Satou, however, the two never played a game together in college, as Nyara missed her first two seasons with knee injuries. Nyara was drafted fifth overall by the New York Liberty in the 2022 WNBA draft.

Satou's younger brother, Lamin, played college basketball for the UTSA Roadrunners, the Incarnate Word Cardinals, and the Iona Gaels.

=== Endorsements ===
Sabally signed with Jordan Brand in December 2020. In 2022, the company partnered with Sabally to refurbish a basketball court in Berlin, in order to "give a safe space for young girls to play."

In January 2025, Sabally signed with Adidas.

=== Activism ===
According to Kelly Graves, Sabally's head coach at Oregon, she was more determined to make a difference in the world than anyone else he had coached. A Muslim, she considers Muhammad Ali to be one of her greatest inspirations.

In her sophomore season at Oregon, Sabally was one of the Pac-12's two representatives to the NCAA 2019 Leadership forum, and in her rookie WNBA season in 2020, became the only rookie to serve in a leadership role on the WNBA Social Justice Council. According to Sports Illustrated writer Erica Ayala, "her experience being biracial on three continents was a boon for the U.S.-based council hoping to speak about global racism." She completed work for a bachelor's degree in social science with a minor in legal studies in August 2020, graduating in three years with honors.

Sabally has also become a partner with UNICEF, and was one of several WNBA players to sign endorsement deals with the beauty brand Alaffia, a company that follows a social enterprise model and provides work for over 12,000 women in another West African country, Togo.

Sabally received the WNBA Cares Community Assist Award for May 2023. The award recognized "her dedicated efforts in mentoring Dallas youth, as well as her leadership in serving both her teammates and her community."

In February 2024, Sabally joined the WNBA Changemakers Collective and their collaboration with VOICEINSPORT (VIS) as a mentor, "aimed at keeping girls in sport and developing diverse leaders on the court and beyond the game."
