= Gisela Vega =

Argentine basketball player

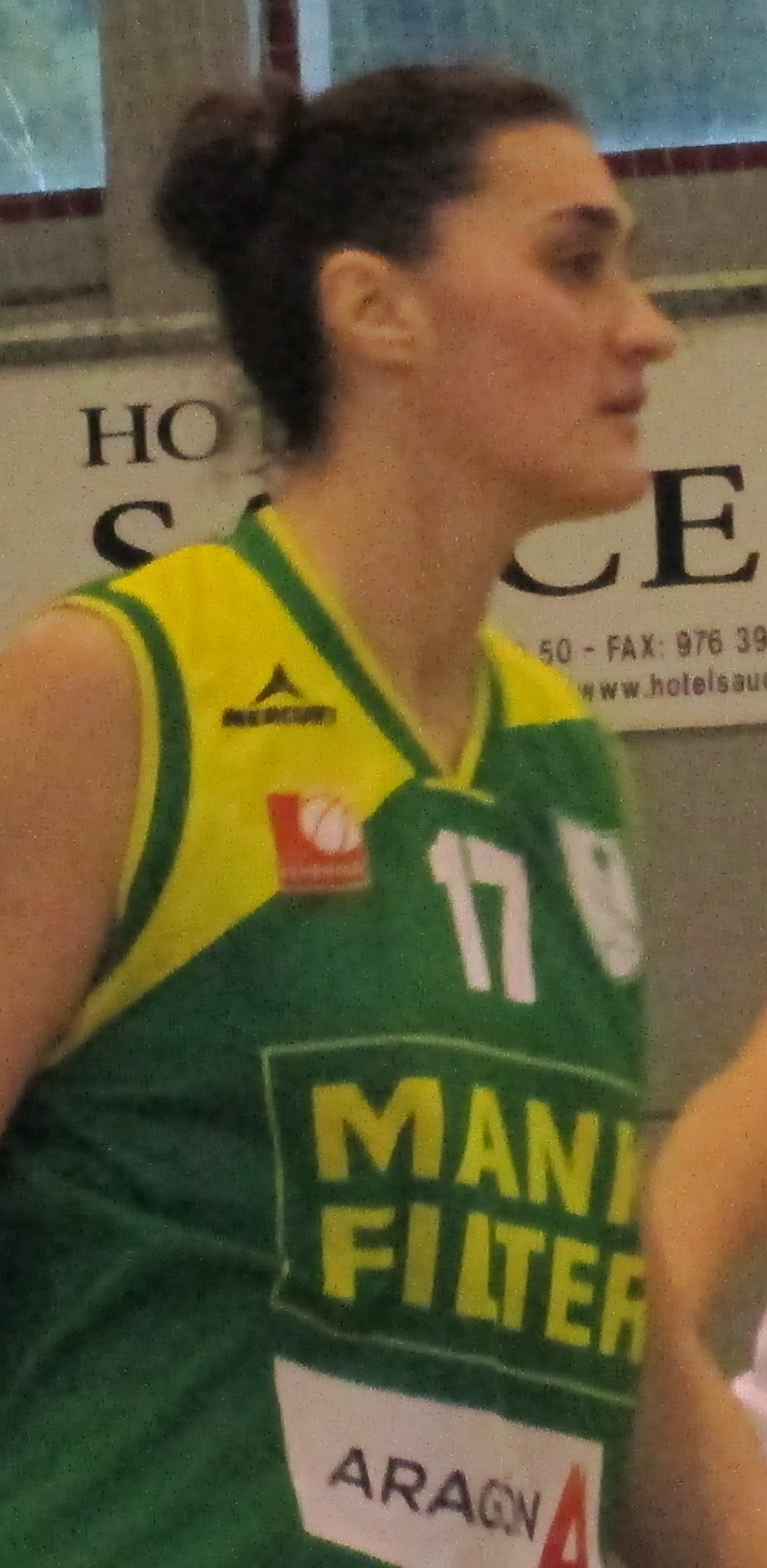

No. 17 – Gernika Bizkaia
- Position: Power forward / center
- League: Liga Femenina de Baloncesto

Personal information
- Born: 14 March 1982 (age 44) Gualeguaychú, Entre Ríos, Argentina
- Listed height: 1.88 m (6 ft 2 in)

Career history
- 2001–2002: Ourense
- 2002–2003: Extrugasa
- 2003–2004: Universidad de Córdoba
- 2004–2005: CB Badajoz
- 2005–2006: Real Canoe
- 2006–2007: Olis Sóller
- 2007: GD Maputo
- 2007–2008: Tarbes Gespe Bigorre
- 2008: Cadí la Seu
- 2008–2010: Joventut Mariana
- 2010: Pueblo Nuevo
- 2010–2011: Uni Girona CB
- 2012: UTE
- 2013: CDB Zaragoza
- 2015: Union Florida
- 2015-present: Gernika Bizkaia

Career highlights
- Most valuable player, Liga 2 (2005, 2007)
Medals
Representing Argentina
FIBA Americas Championship for Women
Bronze medal – third place	2015 Edmonton	Team
FIBA South American Championship for Women
Silver medal – second place	2006 Asunción	Team
Silver medal – second place	2013 Mendoza	Team
Silver medal – second place	2014 Ambato	Team

Gisela Verónica Vega (born 14 March 1982) is an Argentine professional basketball player who plays as a power forward and a center.

Vega has played in Europe since 2001, primarily in Spain (on both the Liga Femenina de Baloncesto and the second tier Liga Femenina 2 de Baloncesto), and has also been part of the French squad Tarbes Gespe Bigorre. She has also been on the Argentina women's national basketball team since 2002, competing in the World Championship along with Americas Championships, South American Championships, and Pan American Games.

Vega's brother, Sebastián Vega, is also a professional basketball player.
