= Paula Carrasco =

Chilean basketball player

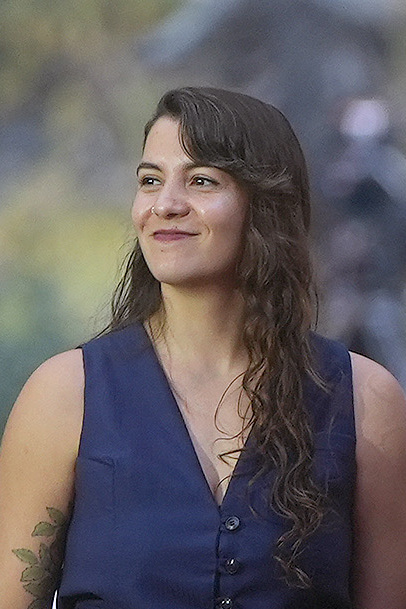
- Carrasco in 2026
- Born: Paula Daniela Carrasco Carrasco; 17 January 1994 (age 32); Valparaíso, Chile
- Education: University of Chile
- Occupations: Basketball player, environmental chemist, public servant
- Political party: Broad Front
- Partner: Gabriel Boric (2024–present)
- Children: 2
Paula Carrasco
Societá Sportiva Italiana Valparaíso
- Position: Point guard / shooting guard
- League: Liga Nacional Femenina de Básquetbol
Personal information
- Listed height: 164 cm (5 ft 5 in)

Paula Daniela Carrasco Carrasco (born 17 January 1994) is a Chilean professional basketball player, environmental chemist, and public servant. She plays for Sportiva Italiana de Valparaíso and is a member of the Chile women's national team. Since 2024, she has been the domestic partner of Gabriel Boric, former President of Chile, although she did not assume the role of First Lady.

== Biography ==
She comes from Valparaíso and was born on 17 January 1994. She is the youngest of her parents' five children, having four older brothers. At the age of eight, she started to play basketball in Brisas club from La Florida.

She studied and graduated from University of Chile with a degree in environmental chemistry. Since February 2023, she has been working in the climate change department of the ministry for the environment, in the section of mitigation and transparency. More specifically, she works on the inventory of greenhouse gases in Chile.

She is a player from club Sportiva Italiana de Valparaíso, at the position of shooting guard and occasionally point guard. In November 2023, she participated in the Santiago Panamericans Games with the basketball national team. At that time, she shared the difficulty of finding balance between motherhood and her professional career and high performance sport.

== Personal life ==
On 16 September 2024, Carrasco and President Gabriel Boric made their relationship public after having started their relationship in November 2023. In December 2024, Carrasco and Boric announced that they were expecting their first child together. Carrasco has a son from a previous relationship.
