= Damiris Dantas =

Brazilian basketball player (born 1992)

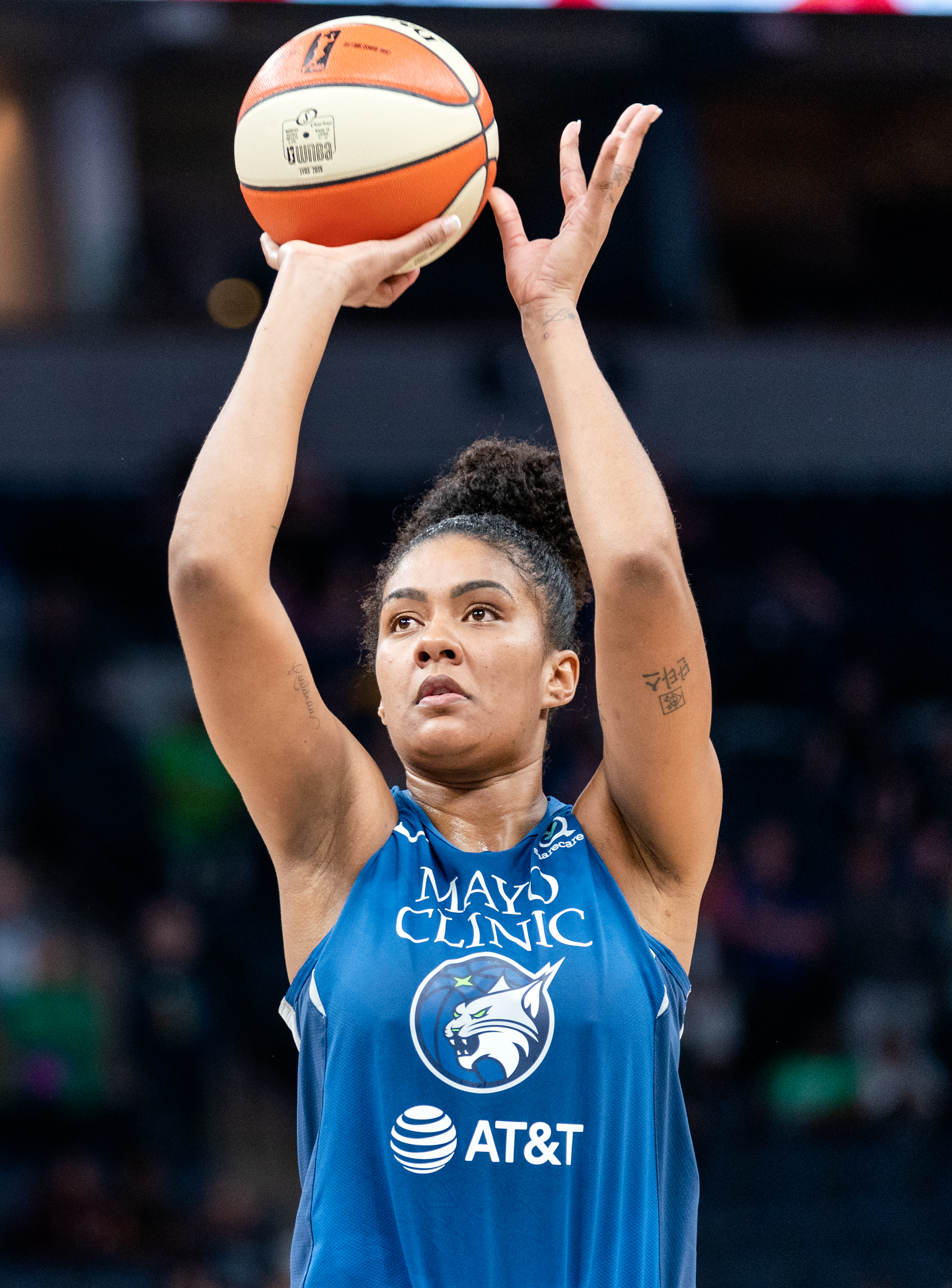
- Dantas with the Minnesota Lynx in 2019

No. 12 – Indiana Fever
- Position: Power forward / Center
- League: WNBA

Personal information
- Born: November 17, 1992 (age 33) Ferraz de Vasconcelos, Brazil
- Listed height: 6 ft 4 in (1.93 m)
- Listed weight: 203 lb (92 kg)

Career information
- WNBA draft: 2012: 1st round, 12th overall pick
- Drafted by: Minnesota Lynx
- Playing career: 2011–present

Career history
- 2010–2011: COC/Jundiaí
- 2011–2012: Real Celta Vigo
- 2012: Ourinhos
- 2013: Maranhao
- 2013–2015: Americana
- 2014–2015: Minnesota Lynx
- 2015; 2017: Atlanta Dream
- 2019–2023: Minnesota Lynx
- 2023–2024: OGM Ormanspor
- 2024–present: Indiana Fever
- 2024–present: Botaş SK

Career highlights
- WNBA Commissioner's Cup champion (2025)
- Stats at WNBA.com
- Stats at Basketball Reference
Medals
Women's basketball
Representing Brazil
Pan American Games
Gold medal – first place	2019 Lima	Team
Bronze medal – third place	2011 Guadalajara	Team
FIBA AmeriCup
Gold medal – first place	2011 Neiva
Gold medal – first place	2023 León
Silver medal – second place	2025 Santiago
Bronze medal – third place	2013 Xalapa
Bronze medal – third place	2019 San Juan
South American Championship
Gold medal – first place	2013 Mendoza
World Championship U-19
Bronze medal – third place	2011 Chile

Damiris Dantas do Amaral (born November 17, 1992) is a Brazilian basketball player for the Indiana Fever of the Women's National Basketball Association (WNBA) and for Botaş SK of the Turkish Super League.

Together with the junior Brazilian team, she won the bronze medal at the Under-19 World Championship in 2011, Chile, and was named Most Valuable Player at that tournament. That same year, Dantas was also champion of the 2011 FIBA Americas Championship for Women with the senior national team, and won a bronze medal at the 2011 Pan American Games.

Dantas began playing basketball at Janeth Arcain's basketball institute at age 13. Within four years, she had become a professional.

Dantas played for Ourinhos in 2012, Maranhão in 2013, and Americana in 2013–2015.

== WNBA ==
=== Minnesota Lynx (2014–2015) ===
Dantas was drafted by the Minnesota Lynx in the First Round of the 2012 WNBA draft - 12th Overall. Dantas was not expected to play in the WNBA until after the 2012 Olympic Games.

She was signed by the Lynx on April 2, 2014. Dantas made her WNBA debut on May 16, 2014, gathering 12 rebounds in a win against Washington. Dantas became the second rookie in league history to debut with 10 rebounds and 5 assists. With Rebekkah Brunson being sidelined with tendinitis, Dantas became the starter and soon led the WNBA rookies in rebounds. On August 9, 2015, she made 18 points.

=== Atlanta Dream (2015 and 2017) ===
On July 27, 2015, Dantas was traded to the Atlanta Dream as part of the three-team deal. She was suspended for the 2016 WNBA season after she failed to report to training camp, instead using the time to train with the Brazilian National team for the 2016 Summer Olympics that the country would host in Rio de Janeiro. Atlanta retained Dantas's rights and they expected her to play with the team during the 2017 season.

=== Minnesota Lynx (2019–2023) ===
On February 8, 2019, Dantas signed with the Minnesota Lynx as a free agent. Dantas missed several games in 2019 due to a calf injury. In 2019, Dantas started all 26 games she played in and recorded career-highs in minutes, points, and assists per game. She continued to expand her game and make herself valuable for the Lynx as she improved her outside shooting to open up the inside play for Sylvia Fowles.

Dantas showed up in 2020 for the Lynx as they played in the WNBA Bubble. Over the 22-game campaign, Dantas shot 44.3% from three-point on just over four attempts beyond the arc per game, cementing her spot as one of the WNBA's elite-shooting bigs. She finished the season with averages of 12.9 points, 6.1 rebounds, and 2.6 assists per game. Dantas and the Lynx agreed to a multi-year extension in September 2020 after she completed one of her best years in the WNBA. Coach Cheryl Reeve stated that, “Damiris has been such an important part of the Lynx culture since she first became a member of our organization in 2014...She has made great strides as a player over the last couple of years and remains an important element in our path forward.”

In one of the final games of the 2021 season, Dantas suffered a Lisfranc injury in her right foot, forcing her to end her season early and undergo surgery. The extensive recovery time led to her developing a depression that led to lesser results and ultimately a nervous breakdown at the fifteenth game of the 2022 season. After discussing with Reeve, the coach agreed Dantas was not mentally well enough to continue playing, sidelining her to spend time resting and receiving psychological treatment. Dantas attended the Lynx training camp in 2023 and was waived. To compensate her absence in the WNBA, Dantas led the Brazilian team to the 2023 FIBA Women's AmeriCup title and played in both Mexico for Fuerza Regia and Turkey for Ormanspor.

=== Indiana Fever (2024–present) ===
On February 1, 2024 Dantas signed a multi-year contract with the Indiana Fever. Dantas had to miss the opening week of training camp due to an issue with her visa and a family emergency. She returned to Indianapolis for the second week of camp, but a knee injury prevented her from training with the team. The Fever suspended her contract while she recovered from her injury. On June 25, 2024, the Fever activated Dantas. On April 12, 2026, it was announced that Dantas had re-signed with the Fever.

== WNBA career statistics ==
Legend
GP	Games played	GS	Games started	MPG	Minutes per game	RPG	Rebounds per game
APG	Assists per game	SPG	Steals per game	BPG	Blocks per game	PPG	Points per game
TO	Turnovers per game	FG%	Field-goal percentage	3P%	3-point field-goal percentage	FT%	Free-throw percentage
**Bold**	Career best	°	League leader

=== Regular season ===
WNBA regular season statistics
Year	Team	GP	GS	MPG	FG%	3P%	FT%	RPG	APG	SPG	BPG	TO	PPG
2012	Did not play (Olympic commitment)												
2013	Did not play												
2014	Minnesota	30	23	21.8	.511	**1.000**	.760	5.1	1.2	.5	.3	.8	6.0
2015	Minnesota	16	4	16.7	**.581**	.667	.789	3.3	1.2	.2	.3	1.1	5.6
2015	Atlanta	16	16	24.8	.383	.333	**.973**	5.4	.7	.9	**.6**	1.1	8.3
2016	Did not play (Olympic commitment)												
2017	Atlanta	34	2	18.0	.392	.265	.767	3.6	.7	.5	.5	.8	7.7
2018	Atlanta	19	0	13.4	.433	.238	.722	2.4	.8	.4	.0	**.5**	5.4
2019	Minnesota	26	**26**	25.6	.432	.393	.731	4.5	**3.2**	.7	.5	1.7	9.2
2020	Minnesota	22	22	**26.6**	.464	.433	.727	**6.1**	2.6	**1.1**	.2	1.8	**12.9**
2021	Minnesota	24	20	23.8	.377	.333	.650	4.0	2.3	.4	.3	1.8	7.7
2022	Minnesota	15	15	17.5	.304	.262	.833	3.8	1.9	.2	.1	1.1	5.1
2023	Did not play												
2024	Indiana	20	0	10.5	.459	.394	.667	2.2	.6	.3	.3	.6	4.5
2025	Indiana	**38**	0	11.6	.348	.263	.857	2.4	.7	.2	.1	.8	4.6
2026	Indiana	12	0	8.2	.406	.350	.778	1.5	.3	.2	.2	.8	3.3
**Career**	11 years, 3 teams	272	128	18.5	.417	.333	.783	3.7	1.4	.5	.3	1.1	6.8

=== Playoffs ===
WNBA playoff statistics
Year	Team	GP	GS	MPG	FG%	3P%	FT%	RPG	APG	SPG	BPG	TO	PPG
2014	Minnesota	3	0	8.4	.500	—	—	.7	.3	.0	.0	**.3**	.7
2019	Minnesota	1	1	28.0	**.615**	.333	**1.000**	6.0	1.0	**2.0**	.0	5.0°	**20.0**
2020	Minnesota	**4**	**4**	**34.3**	.471	**.519**	.833	**7.5**	**2.8**	1.5	.0	2.5	18.0
2024	Indiana	2	0	16.0	.500	.400	**1.000**	1.0	.5	.0	.0	.5	8.0
2025	Indiana	Did not play (concussion protocol)											
2026	Indiana	Did not play (injury)											
**Career**	4 years, 2 teams	10	5	22.2	.500	.474	.875	4.0	1.4	.8	.0	1.7	11.0
