= Colombia women's national basketball team =

Colombia
- FIBA ranking: 20 (14 September 2026)
- FIBA zone: FIBA Americas
- National federation: Federación Colombiana de Balocesto
- Coach: Luis Cuenca

World Cup
- Appearances: 1

FIBA AmeriCup
- Appearances: 7
Home	Away

The Colombia women's national basketball team is the official women's basketball team for Colombia. It is administered by the Federación Colombiana de Baloncesto.

== Tournament record ==
=== FIBA World Championship ===
- 1975 – 7th place

=== FIBA Americas Championship ===
- 1997 – 6th place
- 2011 – 7th place
- 2017 – 7th place
- 2019 – 5th place
- 2021 – 5th place
- 2023 – 5th place
- 2025 – 5th place
- 2027 – Qualified

== Current roster ==
Roster for the 2025 FIBA Women's AmeriCup.

Colombia women's national basketball team roster
Players
Coaches

Pos.	No.	Name	Age – Date of birth	Height	Club	Ctr.
SG	0	Marta Moscarella	17 – 9 October 2007	1.80 m (5 ft 11 in)	Magnolia Basket Campobasso	(Italy)
F	5	Daihana Murillo	22 – 7 September 2002	1.72 m (5 ft 8 in)
C	6	Yuliany Paz	25 – 20 June 2000	1.93 m (6 ft 4 in)	Indeportes Antioquia	(Colombia)
PG	7	Mayra Caicedo	25 – 12 January 2000	1.61 m (5 ft 3 in)	Indeportes Antioquia	(Colombia)
PG	8	Carolina López	26 – 18 August 1998	1.65 m (5 ft 5 in)	Indeportes Antioquia	(Colombia)
PG	9	Manuela Ríos	28 – 25 January 1997	1.63 m (5 ft 4 in)	Sportiva Italiana	(Chile)
F	10	Mabel Martínez	? – 28 October 1986	1.78 m (5 ft 10 in)	Indeportes Antioquia	(Colombia)
SG	12	Jennifer Muñoz (C)	34 – 1 February 1991	1.71 m (5 ft 7 in)	Indeportes Antioquia	(Colombia)
C	14	Marlyn Venté	29 – 8 July 1995	1.85 m (6 ft 1 in)	Indeportes Antioquia	(Colombia)
PF	19	Daniela González	22 – 28 July 2002	1.80 m (5 ft 11 in)
C	21	Valentina López	26 – 25 April 1999	1.75 m (5 ft 9 in)	Indeportes Antioquia	(Colombia)
SG	22	Esperanza Delgado	29 – 9 March 1996	1.70 m (5 ft 7 in)	BC Neptūnas	(Lithuania)

Head coach

- (Colombia) Luis Cuenca

Assistant coach(es)

- (Colombia) Ricardo Pinzon

Legend

- (C) Team captain
- Club – describes last
  club before the tournament
- Age – describes age
  on 28 June 2025

== See also ==
- Colombia women's national under-19 basketball team
- Colombia women's national under-17 basketball team
- Colombia women's national 3x3 team
