= Tainá Paixão =

Brazilian basketball player (born 1991)

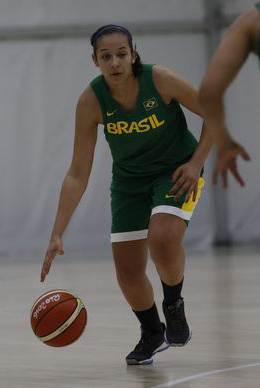

América Basquete
- Position: Point guard
- League: LBF

Personal information
- Born: November 29, 1991 (age 34) Jundiaí, São Paulo
- Listed height: 5 ft 7 in (1.70 m)
Medals
Women's basketball
Representing Brazil
Pan American Games
Gold medal – first place	2019 Lima	Team
FIBA AmeriCup
Gold medal – first place	2023 León
Bronze medal – third place	2021 San Juan
South American Championship
Gold medal – first place	2022 Argentina	Team

Tainá Mayara da Paixão (born November 29, 1991) is a Brazilian basketball player for América Basquete Recife and the Brazilian national team, where she participated at the 2014 FIBA World Championship, the 2015 Pan American Games. and the 2016 Summer Olympics.
