= Nicaragua women's national basketball team =

Nicaragua
- FIBA ranking: 91 (18 March 2026)
- Joined FIBA: 1959
- FIBA zone: FIBA Americas
- National federation: Federación Nicaraguense de Baloncesto (FENIBALON)

Olympic Games
- Appearances: None

World Cup
- Appearances: None

FIBA Women's AmeriCup
- Appearances: 1
Home	Away

The Nicaragua women's national basketball team is the women's national basketball team of Nicaragua. It is managed by the Federación Nicaraguense de Baloncesto (FENIBALON).

The team participated at the 2015 FIBA COCABA Championship for Women and later also at the 2017 Central American Games. They will make their debut at the FIBA Women's AmeriCup in 2029.

== Competitions results ==
=== Americas Championship ===
Year	Round	Position	Pld	W	L
(Brazil) 1989	Did not qualify				
(Brazil) 1993	Did not qualify				
(Canada) 1995	Did not qualify				
(Brazil) 1997	Did not qualify				
(Cuba) 1999	Did not qualify				
(Brazil) 2001	Did not qualify				
(Mexico) 2003	Did not qualify				
(Dominican Republic) 2005	Did not qualify				
(Chile) 2007	Did not qualify				
(Brazil) 2009	Did not qualify				
(Colombia) 2011	Did not qualify				
(Mexico) 2013	Did not qualify				
(Canada) 2015	Did not qualify				
(Argentina) 2017	Did not qualify				
(Puerto Rico) 2019	Did not qualify				
(Puerto Rico) 2021	Did not qualify				
(Mexico) 2023	Did not qualify				
(Chile) 2025	Did not qualify				
(El Salvador) 2027	Did not qualify				
(Nicaragua) 2029	Qualified as host				
Total	0 Titles	1/20	0	0	0

== See also ==
- Nicaragua men's national basketball team
- Nicaragua women's national under-19 basketball team
- Nicaragua women's national under-17 basketball team
- Nicaragua women's national 3x3 team
