= 2027 FIBA Women's AmeriCup =

Basketball tournament

- 2027 FIBA Women's AmeriCup logo

Tournament details
- Host country: El Salvador
- City: San Salvador
- Dates: 3–11 July
- Teams: 10 (from 1 confederation)
- Venue: 1 (in 1 host city)

Official website
- Official website

The 2027 FIBA Women's AmeriCup will be the 19th edition of the biannual Americas continental championship in women's basketball, sanctioned by the FIBA Americas, for women's national basketball teams. It will be held from 3 to 11 July 2027 in San Salvador, El Salvador, marking the first time the competition will be in Central America.

Ten teams will participate in the tournament, with qualification taking place between July 2025 and August 2026. As hosts, El Salvador automatically qualified.

The top four teams will qualify for the 2028 FIBA Women's Olympic Qualifying Tournaments where they will compete for spots in the Olympic tournament in Los Angeles, besides the United States who automatically qualified as hosts.

United States are the defending champions, beating Brazil 92–84 in the 2025 final in Santiago.

== Host selection ==
On 10 December 2025, El Salvador was awarded the tournament as the only bidder for the edition. This will be El Salvador's first time hosting the event. This will also be the first time the competition will be in Central America.

"We are proud to host the top continental event for senior women’s national teams. We will work tirelessly from this moment on to ensure that the FIBA Women’s AmeriCup 2027 becomes an unforgettable experience for every team and visitor, and we are certain they will want to return to our land. We are grateful to FIBA Americas for trusting El Salvador to host this competition.”

— Yamil Bukele, president of the Salvadoran Basketball Federation.

== Qualification ==
Map of qualifiers for the 2027 FIBA Women's AmeriCup: Team qualified for 2027 FIBA Women's AmeriCup Team failed to qualify Did not enter

Qualifying tournaments were played between July 2025 and August 2026, consisting of four tournaments; teams from Central America and the Caribbean competed in the 2025 FIBA COCABA Championship for Women and the 2025 FIBA Women's Caribbean Championship, respectively, which also served as pre-qualifiers for the 2026 Centrobasket. South American teams competed in the 2026 South American Championship. In total, nearly 20 countries took part in these competitions. Canada and United States were given automatic tickets to the tournament. El Salvador as host are also given an automatic qualification.

Of the qualified teams, nine teams took part in the previous edition. Venezuela return after missing out in 2025. 2025 hosts Chile failed to qualify this time round.

=== Qualified teams ===
| Qualification | Host | Dates | Vacancies | Qualified |
|---|---|---|---|---|
| Host | (United States) Miami | 10 December 2025 | 1 | El Salvador |
| Automatic entry | (United States) Miami | 10 December 2025 | 2 | Canada; United States |
| 2026 Centrobasket Women | (Nicaragua) Managua | 12–18 July 2026 | 3 | Puerto Rico; Mexico; Dominican Republic |
| 2026 South American Championship | (Argentina) Zárate | 3–9 August 2026 | 4 | Argentina; Brazil; Colombia; Venezuela |

=== Summary of qualified teams ===
| Team | Qualification method | Date of qualification | Appearance(s) | | | | Previous best performance (Note: Bold text indicates they hosted that edition.) | WR (Note: World ranking at start of tournament.) |
| Team | Qualification method | Date of qualification | Total | First | Last | Streak | Previous best performance | WR |
|---|---|---|---|---|---|---|---|---|
| El Salvador | Host nation | 10 December 2025 | 3rd | 2021 | 2025 | 2 | Ninth place (2021) | TBD |
| Canada | Automatic entry | 10 December 2025 | 19th | 1989 | 2025 | 19 | Champions (1995, 2015, 2017) | TBD |
| United States | Automatic entry | 10 December 2025 | 9th | 1989 | 2025 | 5 | Champions (1993, 2007, 2019, 2021, 2025) | TBD |
| Puerto Rico | Top three at 2026 Centrobasket Women | 17 July 2026 | 15th | 1993 | 2025 | 10 | Runners-up (2021) | TBD |
| Mexico | Top three at 2026 Centrobasket Women | 17 July 2026 | 13th | 1989 | 2025 | 3 | Fourth place (1999) | TBD |
| Dominican Republic | Top three at 2026 Centrobasket Women | 18 July 2026 | 13th | 1989 | 2025 | 5 | Sixth place (1989, 1999, 2005) | TBD |
| Argentina | Top four at 2026 South American Championship | 4 August 2026 | 19th | 1989 | 2025 | 19 | Runners-up (2009, 2011, 2017) | TBD |
| Venezuela | Top four at 2026 South American Championship | 6 August 2026 | 8th | 1999 | 2023 | 1 | Fifth place (2015) | TBD |
| Colombia | Top four at 2026 South American Championship | 7 August 2026 | 8th | 1997 | 2025 | 6 | Fifth place (2019, 2021, 2023, 2025) | TBD |
| Brazil | Top four at 2026 South American Championship | 7 August 2026 | 18th | 1989 | 2025 | 16 | Champions (Six times) (Note: Brazil have won in 1997, 2001, 2003, 2009, 2011 and 2023.) | TBD |

== Format ==
The ten teams will be drawn into two groups of five teams. The top four teams from each group will advance to the quarterfinals. A first-placed team will face the fourth-placed team and a second-placed team will play against a third-placed team of the other group. A knockout system with consolations will be used after the preliminary round.

== Venue ==
The venue for the entire competition will be the Gimnasio Nacional José Adolfo Pineda in El Salvador's capital, San Salvador. The venue inaugurated in 1950 and hosted Basketball at the 1959 Central American and Caribbean Games. It also hosted Miss Universe 2023.

| 2027 FIBA Women's AmeriCup is located in El Salvador | San Salvador |
|---|---|
| 2027 FIBA Women's AmeriCup is located in El Salvador | Gimnasio Nacional José Adolfo Pineda |
| 2027 FIBA Women's AmeriCup is located in El Salvador | Capacity: 12,900 |

== Final standings ==
| Rank | Team | Record |
|---|---|---|
| 1st place, gold medalist(s) | | 0–0 |
| 2nd place, silver medalist(s) | | 0–0 |
| 3rd place, bronze medalist(s) | | 0–0 |
| 4 | | 0–0 |
| 5 | | 0–0 |
| 6 | | 0–0 |
| 7 | | 0–0 |
| 8 | | 0–0 |
| 9 | | 0–0 |
| 10 | | 0–0 |

| Qualified for the 2028 FIBA Women's Olympic Qualifying Tournaments |
| Qualified for the 2028 FIBA Women's Olympic Qualifying Tournaments as winner of the 2026 FIBA Women's Olympic Pre-Qualifying Tournament. |

The Americas region can qualify four nations to the Olympic Qualifying tournaments. The United States have already qualified for the Olympics as host but still would take one of the four berths, Canada won the Fiba Olympic Pre-Qualifying Tournament claiming one of the four berths prior to this tournament.
