= Chile women's national basketball team =

Chile
- FIBA ranking: 71 ▼2 (18 March 2026)
- Joined FIBA: 1935
- FIBA zone: FIBA Americas
- National federation: Chile Basketball Federation
- Coach: Christian Santander

World Cup
- Appearances: 3
- Medals: Silver: 1953

Women's AmeriCup
- Appearances: 10

Pan American Games
- Appearances: 3
- Medals: Silver: 1955; Bronze:1959, 1963
Home	Away

The Chile women's national basketball team is administered by the Federación de Básquetbol de Chile (FEBA Chile).

== History ==
The team has had a remarkable performance throughout its history, especially in the South American context. Its success dates back to the 1940s, when they began to establish themselves as one of the dominant forces in the region. At the 1946 South American Championship, they achieved their first title, beginning an era of success that extended into the 1960s.

During this golden period, Chile won a total of four South American titles (1946, 1950, 1956 and 1960). These triumphs positioned the Chilean team as one of the strongest in FIBA Americas, competing on equal terms with powerhouses such as Brazil and Argentina. In addition, they achieved several runner-up and third-place finishes, demonstrating their consistency at the high regional level.

However, from the 1970s onwards, the team's performance began to decline. Although they continued to participate in international competitions, the team was unable to maintain the same level of success that it had achieved in previous decades. Changes in the development of the sport in the region and the rise of other South American teams affected their dominance.

In recent decades, the team has had outstanding performances, although not at the level of its golden era. They have managed to place third in several editions of the South American Championship, especially in 1993, 1995 and 2001. In addition, they have participated in tournaments such as the FIBA AmeriCup, although without reaching the podium.

== Competitions ==
=== Olympic Games ===
Year	Round	Position	Pld	W	L
1976–2024	Did not qualify				
(United States) 2028	To be determined				
Total	0 Titles	0	0	0	0

=== World Championship ===
Year	Round	Position	Pld	W	L
(Chile) 1953	Second place	2nd	6	4	2
(Brazil) 1957	Final round	7th	9	2	7
(Soviet Union) 1959	Did not qualify				
(Peru) 1964	Preliminary round	11th	8	3	5
1964–2026	Did not qualify				
(Japan) 2030	To be determined				
Total	0 Titles	3/21	23	9	14

=== Americas Championship ===
Year	Round	Position	Pld	W	L
(Brazil) 1989	Did not qualify				
(Brazil) 1993	First round	8th	4	0	4
(Canada) 1995	First round	5th	4	0	4
(Brazil) 1997	Did not qualify				
(Cuba) 1999	Did not qualify				
(Brazil) 2001	First round	5th	3	1	2
(Mexico) 2003	First round	6th	4	1	3
(Dominican Republic) 2005	Did not qualify				
(Chile) 2007	Preliminary round	6th	5	2	3
(Brazil) 2009	Preliminary round	6th	5	2	3
(Colombia) 2011	Preliminary round	10th	4	0	4
(Mexico) 2013	Preliminary round	6th	4	1	3
(Canada) 2015	Preliminary round	7th	4	1	3
(Argentina) 2017	Did not qualify				
(Puerto Rico) 2019	Did not qualify				
(Puerto Rico) 2021	Did not qualify				
(Mexico) 2023	Did not qualify				
(Chile) 2025	Preliminary round	9th	4	0	4
(El Salvador) 2027	Did not qualify				
(Nicaragua) 2029	To be determined				
Total	0 Titles	10/19	41	8	33

=== Pan American Games ===
Year	Round	Position	Pld	W	L
(Mexico) 1955	Second place	2nd	8	5	3
(United States) 1959	Third place	3rd	8	4	4
(Brazil) 1963	Third place	3rd	6	2	4
1967–2019	Did not qualify				
(Chile) 2023	Sixth place	6th	4	1	3
(Peru) 2027	To be determined				
(Paraguay) 2031	To be determined				
Total	0 Titles	0	0	0	0

== Team ==
=== Current squad ===
Roster for the 2025 FIBA Women's AmeriCup.

Chile women's national basketball team roster
Players
Coaches

Pos.	No.	Name	Age – Date of birth	Height	Club	Ctr.
PG	1	Damaris Alarcon	21 – 1 July 2003	1.67 m (5 ft 6 in)	Municipal Puente Alto	(Chile)
PG	2	Javiera Campos	22 – 5 July 2002	1.63 m (5 ft 4 in)	Los Leones de Quilpué	(Chile)
PF	3	Valentina Ojeda	22 – 27 February 2003	1.80 m (5 ft 11 in)
G	4	Amanda Guineo	17 – 4 September 2007	1.60 m (5 ft 3 in)	Sportiva Italiana	(Chile)
SF	7	Catalina Pérez	27 – 10 August 1997	1.73 m (5 ft 8 in)	Sportiva Italiana	(Chile)
SF	8	Antonia Andaur	23 – 3 January 2002	1.69 m (5 ft 7 in)	Municipal Puente Alto	(Chile)
PG	9	Catalina Ramírez	22 – 3 January 2003	1.81 m (5 ft 11 in)	Municipal Puente Alto	(Chile)
PF	10	Bárbara Cousiño (C)	29 – 23 May 1996	1.78 m (5 ft 10 in)	UdeC	(Chile)
C	11	Valentina Monzo	22 – 6 February 2003	1.88 m (6 ft 2 in)
C	12	Constanza Cardenas	27 – 18 June 1998	1.85 m (6 ft 1 in)	UdeC	(Chile)
G	22	Jovanka Ljubetic	25 – 15 April 2000	1.78 m (5 ft 10 in)	Los Leones de Quilpué	(Chile)
PF	25	Catalina Abuyeres	28 – 25 February 1997	1.82 m (6 ft 0 in)	Universidad de Chile	(Chile)

Head coach

- (Argentina) Cristian Santander

Assistant coach(es)

- (Chile) Julia Acevedo

Legend

- (C) Team captain
- Club – describes last
  club before the tournament
- Age – describes age
  on 28 June 2025

=== Head coaches ===
- (Chile) Mario Negron 2016
- (Chile) Andrea Bilbao 2018–2024
- (Argentina) Cristian Santander 2024–

== Sponsors ==
- (United States) Nike
- (Estonia) Coolbet

== See also ==
- Chile women's national under-17 basketball team
- Chile men's national basketball team
