= Brazil women's national basketball team =

Brazil
- FIBA ranking: 10 ▼1 (14 September 2026)
- FIBA zone: FIBA Americas
- National federation: Brazilian Basketball Confederation
- Coach: Pokey Chatman

Olympic Games
- Appearances: 7
- Medals: Silver (1996); Bronze (2000)

World Cup
- Appearances: 17
- Medals: (gold) Gold (1994); (bronze) Bronze (1971)

FIBA AmeriCup
- Appearances: 17
- Medals: Gold (1997, 2001, 2003, 2009, 2011, 2023); Silver (1989, 1993, 1999, 2005, 2025); Bronze (2007, 2013, 2019, 2021)

Pan American Games
- Appearances: 17
- Medals: Gold (1967, 1971, 1991, 2019, 2023); Silver (1959, 1963, 1987, 2007); Bronze (1955, 1983, 2003, 2011)
Home	Away

First international
- Brazil 22–23 France (Santiago, Chile; March 7, 1953)

Biggest win
- Brazil 143–50 Malaysia (Kuala Lumpur, Malaysia; July 17, 1990)

Biggest defeat
- Brazil 59–99 United States (São Paulo, Brazil; September 23, 2006)
Medal record
Olympic Games
Silver medal – second place	1996 Atlanta	Team
Bronze medal – third place	2000 Sydney	Team
World Cup
Gold medal – first place	1994 Australia
Bronze medal – third place	1971 Brazil
FIBA AmeriCup
Gold medal – first place	1997 Brazil
Gold medal – first place	2001 Brazil
Gold medal – first place	2003 Mexico
Gold medal – first place	2009 Brazil
Gold medal – first place	2011 Colombia
Gold medal – first place	2023 Mexico
Silver medal – second place	1989 Brazil
Silver medal – second place	1993 Brazil
Silver medal – second place	1999 Cuba
Silver medal – second place	2005 Dominican Republic
Silver medal – second place	2025 Chile
Bronze medal – third place	2007 Chile
Bronze medal – third place	2013 Mexico
Bronze medal – third place	2019 Puerto Rico
Bronze medal – third place	2021 Puerto Rico

The Brazil women's national basketball team represents Brazil in international women's basketball.

Brazil won the 1994 FIBA World Championship for Women in Australia.

== Achievements ==
=== Olympic Games ===
Olympic Games
Year	Position	Pld	W	L	PF	PA	PD
1976	Did not qualify						
1980	Did not qualify						
1984	Did not qualify						
1988	Did not qualify						
1992	7th	5	2	3	385	398	−13
1996	2nd place, silver medalist(s)	8	7	1	693	600	+93
2000	3rd place, bronze medalist(s)	8	4	4	562	527	+35
2004	4th	8	4	4	634	583	+51
2008	11th	5	1	4	337	354	−17
2012	9th	5	1	4	329	354	−25
2016	11th	5	0	5	335	384	−49
2020	Did not qualify						
2024	Did not qualify						
2028	Future games						
2032	Future games						
Total		44	19	25	3275	3200	+75

=== FIBA World Championship ===
Year	Championship	Result
1953	Chile	4th
1957	Brazil	4th
1959	USSR	8th
1964	Peru	5th
1967	Czechoslovakia	8th
1971	Brazil	Bronze
1975	Colombia	6th
1979	Seoul	12th
1983	Brazil	5th
1986	Soviet Union	11th
1990	Malaysia	10th
1994	Australia	Gold
1998	Germany	4th
2002	China	7th
2006	Brazil	4th
2010	Czech Republic	9th
2014	Turkey	11th
2018	Spain	Did not qualify
2022	Australia	Did not qualify
2026	Germany	Did not qualify
2030	Japan	To be determined

=== FIBA AmeriCup ===
- 1989 – 2nd place
- 1993 – 2nd place
- 1997 – 1st place
- 1999 – 2nd place
- 2001 – 1st place
- 2003 – 1st place
- 2005 – 2nd place
- 2007 – 3rd place
- 2009 – 1st place
- 2011 – 1st place
- 2013 – 3rd place
- 2015 – 4th place
- 2017 – 4th place
- 2019 – 3rd place
- 2021 – 3rd place
- 2023 – 1st place
- 2025 – 2nd place
- 2027 – Qualified
- 2029 – To be determined

=== Pan American Games ===
- 1955 – 3rd place
- 1959 – 2nd place
- 1963 – 2nd place
- 1967 – 1st place
- 1971 – 1st place
- 1975 – 4th place
- 1979 – 4th place
- 1983 – 3rd place
- 1987 – 2nd place
- 1991 – 1st place
- 1999 – 4th place
- 2003 – 3rd place
- 2007 – 2nd place
- 2011 – 3rd place
- 2015 – 4th place
- 2019 – 1st place
- 2023 – 1st place

== Team ==
=== Current roster ===
Roster for the 2025 FIBA Women's AmeriCup.

Brazil women's national basketball team roster
Players
Coaches

Pos.	No.	Name	Age – Date of birth	Height	Club	Ctr.
SF	5	Ayla McDowell	18 – 9 February 2007	1.86 m (6 ft 1 in)	South Carolina Gamecocks	(United States)
G	8	Bella Nascimento	22 – 21 August 2002	1.64 m (5 ft 5 in)	William & Mary Tribe	(United States)
C	10	Kamilla Cardoso	24 – 30 April 2001	1.98 m (6 ft 6 in)	Chicago Sky	(United States)
SF	11	Emanuely Oliveira	25 – 11 December 1999	1.80 m (5 ft 11 in)	SESI Araraquara	(Brazil)
PF	12	Damiris Dantas (C)	32 – 17 November 1992	1.92 m (6 ft 4 in)	Indiana Fever	(United States)
G	17	Carina Martins	33 – 17 February 1992	1.75 m (5 ft 9 in)	Sampaio	(Brazil)
PF	18	Aline Moura	27 – 4 July 1997	1.85 m (6 ft 1 in)	SESI Araraquara	(Brazil)
C	21	Manu Alves	19 – 2 January 2006	1.90 m (6 ft 3 in)	Illinois Fighting Illini	(United States)
F	22	Vitória Marcelino	29 – 5 June 1996	1.78 m (5 ft 10 in)	SESI Araraquara	(Brazil)
PG	24	Alana Gonçalo	30 – 23 September 1994	1.66 m (5 ft 5 in)	Corinthians	(Brazil)
F	26	Thayná Silva	29 – 27 January 1996	1.80 m (5 ft 11 in)	Sampaio	(Brazil)
SF	30	Catarina Ferreira	24 – 14 January 2001	1.80 m (5 ft 11 in)	Oregon State Beavers	(United States)

Head coach

- (United States) Pokey Chatman

Assistant coach(es)

- (Brazil) Léo Figueiró

Legend

- (C) Team captain
- Club – describes current club
- Age – describes age
  on 28 June 2025

=== Notable players ===
- Hortência Marcari
- Maria Paula Silva
- Janeth Arcain
- Silvinha
- Leila Sobral
- Marta Sobral
- Alessandra Oliveira
- Helen Luz
- Érika de Souza
- Adriana Moisés Pinto
- Damiris Dantas
- Iziane Castro Marques

== See also ==
- Brazil women's national under-19 basketball team
- Brazil women's national under-17 basketball team
- Brazil men's national basketball team
- Brazil women's national 3x3 team
