= Basketball at the 2019 Summer Universiade =

Basketball at the XXX Summer Universiade
- Venues: PalaDelMauro; PalaBarbuto; PalaCercola; PalaJacazzi
- Dates: 3–11 July
- Teams: 16 (men); 16 (women)

Basketball was among the sports of the 2019 Summer Universiade. Games were played from 3 to 11 July at four venues in Italy.

== Venue ==
Type	Venue	City
Competition	Palasport Del Mauro (finals)	Avellino
Competition	PalaBarbuto	Naples
Competition	PalaCercola	Cercola
Competition	PalaJacazzi	Aversa
Training	CUS Napoli (2 courts)	Naples
Training	Palasport	Mondragone
Training	PalaVignola	Caserta
Training	Polifunzionale Soccavo	Naples

== Qualification ==
Following the FISU regulations, the maximum of 16 teams in basketball events in which the number of entries is larger than the authorised participation level will be selected by:

- The entry and the payment of guarantee;
- Those 8 teams finishing top rankings of the previous edition will be automatically qualified;
- Those 4 teams finishing bottom rankings of the previous edition will be replaced by new applying teams;
- The host is automatically qualified;
- The remaining teams will be selected by wild card system according to geographical, continental representation, FISU ranking and FIBA ranking.

=== Qualified teams ===
==== Men's competition ====
Means of qualification	Date	Venue	Vacancies	Qualified
Host country	—	—	1	Italy
Top eight of previous edition of Summer Universiade	20–29 August 2017	(Taiwan) Taipei	8	Lithuania; United States; Latvia; Serbia; Germany; Israel; Finland; Argentina
Continental Quotas	—	—	3	Australia; Canada; China
Wild Cards	—	—	7	Croatia; Czech Republic; Finland; Mexico; Norway; Russia; Ukraine
Total			16	

==== Women's competition ====
Means of qualification	Date	Venue	Vacancies	Qualified
Top eight of previous edition of Summer Universiade	21–28 August 2017	(Taiwan) Taipei	7	Australia; Japan; Chinese Taipei; Russia; United States; Sweden; Canada; Czech Republic
Continental Quotas	—	—	3	Argentina; China; Finland
Wildcards	—	—	6	Hungary; Mexico; Portugal; Romania; Slovakia; Ukraine
Total			16	

== Draw ==
Following the FISU regulations, draw of pool will be based on following by.

- Previous World University Championships results
- Participation in previous Summer Universiades
- Continental representation
- FIBA Rankings

=== Men's competition ===
Pot 1	Pot 2	Pot 3	Pot 4
United States (2); Latvia (3); Germany (5); Israel (6)	Finland (7); Argentina (8); Australia (9); Canada (10)	Russia (17); Czech Republic (12); Norway (14); Ukraine (15)	Mexico; China; Croatia; Italy

=== Women's competition ===
Pot 1	Pot 2	Pot 3	Pot 4
Australia (1); Japan (2); Chinese Taipei (3); Russia (4)	United States (5); Canada (7); Czech Republic (8); Portugal (9)	Hungary (10); Argentina (11); China; Mexico	Romania; Slovakia; Ukraine; Finland

== Pools composition ==
Men's competition				Women's competition			
Pool A	Pool B	Pool C	Pool D	Pool A	Pool B	Pool C	Pool D
Czech Republic	Latvia	China	Germany	Ukraine	Portugal	United States	China
Israel	Croatia	Finland	Canada	Czech Republic	Romania	Chinese Taipei	Finland
Australia	Russia	United States	Italy	Hungary	Russia	Slovakia	Australia
Mexico	Argentina	Ukraine	Norway	Japan	Argentina	Mexico	Canada

== Medal summary ==
=== Medal table ===
Rank	Nation	Gold	Silver	Bronze	Total
1	United States (USA)	1	1	0	2
2	Australia (AUS)	1	0	1	2
3	Ukraine (UKR)	0	1	0	1
4	Portugal (POR)	0	0	1	1
Totals (4 entries)		2	2	2	6

=== Medal events ===
Event	Gold	Silver	Bronze
Men	United States (USA) (Clemson); Al-Amir Dawes; Chase Hunter; Nicolas Honor; Hunter Tyson; Curran Scott; Parker Fox; Gregory Hemenway; Tevin Mack; John Newman III; Khavon Moore; Aamir Simms; Richard Jemison III	Ukraine (UKR); Vadym Prokopenko; Kyrylo Marchenko; Yurii Kondrakov; Ivan Tkachenko; Serhii Pavlov; Viacheslav Petrov; Artem Kovalov; Mykhailo Horobchenko; Andriy Myronenko; Vitaliy Zotov; Illia Sydorov	Australia (AUS); Kyle Zunic; George Blagojevic; Kyrin Galloway; Alex Mudronja; Jock Perry; Jack Purchase; Tanner Krebs; Will Magnay; Jonah Antonio; Isaac White; Jackson White; Dejan Vasiljevic
Women	Australia (AUS); Jasmine Simmons; Anneli Maley; Stephanie Reid; Maddison Rocci; Abigail Wehrung; Alexandra Sharp; Keely Froling; Alicia Froling; Eziyoda Magbegor; Lara McSpadden; Lauren Scherf	United States (USA) (Mississippi State); Rickea Jackson; Myah Taylor; Andra Espinoza-Hunter; Jayla Hemingway; Jessika Carter; Aliyah Matharu; Jazzmun Holmes; Jamya Young; Xaria Wiggins; Sidney Cooks; Yemiyah Morris; Bre'Amber Scott	Portugal (POR); Inês Viana; Ana Carolina Rodrigues; Bárbara Miranda; Laura Ferreira; Joana Soeiro; Josephine Filipe; Maianca Umabano; Carolina Costa; Maria Kostourkova; Ana Santos; Susana Carvalheira; Joana Cristelo Alves
