= 2013 FIBA Americas Championship for Women =

2013 FIBA Women's AmeriCup
12th FIBA Women's Americas Basketball Championship

Tournament details
- Host country: Mexico
- Dates: 21–28 September
- Teams: 10
- Venue: 1 (in 1 host city)

Final positions
- Champions: Cuba (4th title)

Tournament statistics
- MVP: (Cuba) Yamara Amargo
- Top scorer: (Chile) Morrison (23.3)
- Top rebounds: (Argentina) Vega (11.5)
- Top assists: (Argentina) Gretter (6.3)
- PPG (Team): Brazil (83.0)

Official website
- Official website

The 2013 FIBA Americas Championship for Women was the qualifying tournament for FIBA Americas at the 2014 FIBA World Championship for Women in Turkey. The tournament was held at the Gimnasio USBI in Xalapa, Mexico from 21 to 28 September 2013.

Cuba won their fourth title after defeating Canada 77–71 in the final.

== Qualification ==
Qualification was done via FIBA Americas' sub-zones. USA Basketball chose not to enter its national team, because it had already qualified for the 2014 World Championships by winning the 2012 Olympics. The qualified teams were:

- South American Sub-Zone (FIBA South American Championship for Women 2013):
  - Argentina
  - Brazil
  - Chile
  - Venezuela
- North America Sub-Zone:
  - Canada (qualified automatically)
- Central American and Caribbean Zone (2012 Centrobasket Women):
  - Cuba
  - Dominican Republic
  - Jamaica
  - Mexico (host)
  - Puerto Rico

== Draw ==
The draw was held in San Juan, Puerto Rico on July 12, 2013.

== Format ==
- The top two teams from each group advanced to the semifinals.
- The winners in the knockout semifinals advanced to the Final. The losers played for the third place.

=== Tie-breaking criteria ===
Ties are broken via the following the criteria, with the first option used first, all the way down to the last option:

1. Head to head results
2. Goal average (not the goal difference) between the tied teams
3. Goal average of the tied teams for all teams in its group

== Preliminary round ==
Qualified for the semifinals

All times local (UTC−5)

=== Group A ===
Team	Pld	W	L	PF	PA	PD	Pts
Canada	4	4	0	310	173	+137	8
Cuba	4	3	1	282	235	+47	7
Chile	4	1	3	258	311	−53	5
Jamaica	4	1	3	225	285	−60	5
Venezuela	4	1	3	255	326	−71	5

21 September 2013
14:00

Boxscore

Chile	74–77	Venezuela
Scoring by quarter: 11–13, 21–15, 27–24, 15–25
Pts: Morrison 30; Rebs: Morrison 18; Asts: Morales 9		Pts: Márquez 19; Rebs: Silva, Blanco 5 Asts: Silva 6

Gimnasio USBI, Xalapa

21 September 2013
16:15

Boxscore

Jamaica	51–75	Cuba
Scoring by quarter: 23–22, 4–22, 16–16, 8–15
Pts: Smith 12; Rebs: Latouche 6 Asts: Smith 5		Pts: Amargo 23; Rebs: Cepeda 11; Asts: Gelis 3

Gimnasio USBI, Xalapa

22 September 2013
14:00

Boxscore

Canada	75–37	Jamaica
Scoring by quarter: 21–7, 12–18, 21–4, 21–8
Pts: Smith 15; Rebs: Ayim 8 Asts: Pilypaitis 7		Pts: Edwards 12; Rebs: Smith 5 Asts: Smith 3

Gimnasio USBI, Xalapa

22 September 2013
16:15

Boxscore

Cuba	85–59	Chile
Scoring by quarter: 23–15, 20–11, 23–16, 19–17
Pts: Amargo 20; Rebs: Povea 8 Asts: Povea 5		Pts: Morrison 24; Rebs: Morrison 11; Asts: Morales 6

Gimnasio USBI, Xalapa

23 September 2013
14:00

Boxscore

Venezuela	72–82	Cuba
Scoring by quarter: 12–25, 17–15, 18–24, 25–18
Pts: Blanco 19; Rebs: Blanco 10; Asts: Silva, Wallen 5		Pts: Amargo 28; Rebs: Amargo 9 Asts: Casanova 6

Gimnasio USBI, Xalapa

23 September 2013
16:15

Boxscore

Chile	51–93	Canada
Scoring by quarter: 10–26, 9–23, 22–17, 10–27
Pts: Cousiño 18; Rebs: Morrison 6 Asts: Basáez 5		Pts: Thorburn 15; Rebs: Smith 6 Asts: five players 4

Gimnasio USBI, Xalapa

24 September 2013
14:00

Boxscore

Jamaica	56–74	Chile
Scoring by quarter: 10–2, 13–28, 12–28, 21–16
Pts: Smith 14; Rebs: Ashmeade 8 Asts: Dixon 4		Pts: Morrison 20; Rebs: Morrison 9 Asts: Basáez 5

Gimnasio USBI, Xalapa

24 September 2013
16:15

Boxscore

Canada	89–45	Venezuela
Scoring by quarter: 21–8, 16–11, 23–20, 29–6
Pts: Ross 16; Rebs: Tatham 8 Asts: Thorburn 4		Pts: Pérez 13; Rebs: Blanco 6 Asts: Márquez, Pérez 3

Gimnasio USBI, Xalapa

25 September 2013
14:00

Boxscore

Venezuela	61–81	Jamaica
Scoring by quarter: 12–14, 18–23, 20–24, 11–20
Pts: Wallen 15; Rebs: Corrales, Wallen 5 Asts: Silva 5		Pts: Edwards, Latouche 16; Rebs: Gidden 8 Asts: Gordon 7

Gimnasio USBI, Xalapa

25 September 2013
16:15

Boxscore

Cuba	40–53	Canada
Scoring by quarter: 17–9, 13–23, 2–8, 8–13
Pts: Gelis 11; Rebs: Cepeda 8 Asts: Casanova 6		Pts: Tatham 17; Rebs: Tatham 9 Asts: Nurse, Achonwa 3

Gimnasio USBI, Xalapa

=== Group B ===
Team	Pld	W	L	PF	PA	PD	Pts
Brazil	4	4	0	364	202	+162	8
Puerto Rico	4	3	1	301	289	+12	7
Argentina	4	2	2	273	251	+22	6
Dominican Republic	4	1	3	230	335	−105	5
Mexico	4	0	4	235	326	−91	4

21 September 2013
18:30

Boxscore

Brazil	91–54	Puerto Rico
Scoring by quarter: 24–16, 28–15, 20–12, 19–11
Pts: Santos 24; Rebs: Santos 8 Asts: Costa 9		Pts: Cortijo 14; Rebs: Cortijo 6 Asts: Cortijo 6

Gimnasio USBI, Xalapa

21 September 2013
21:10

Boxscore

Argentina	67–53	Mexico
Scoring by quarter: 15–11, 7–12, 17–18, 28–12
Pts: Vega 24; Rebs: Vega 20; Asts: Flores 5		Pts: Silva 17; Rebs: A. García 6 Asts: Silva 5

Gimnasio USBI, Xalapa

22 September 2013
18:30

Boxscore

Puerto Rico	85–79	Argentina
Scoring by quarter: 27–22, 12–26, 16–14, 30–17
Pts: Sepúlveda, García 24; Rebs: Sepúlveda 16; Asts: Sepúlveda 8		Pts: Santana 20; Rebs: Vega 8 Asts: Gretter 6

Gimnasio USBI, Xalapa

22 September 2013
20:45

Boxscore

Dominican Republic	43–107	Brazil
Scoring by quarter: 11–27, 6–25, 12–25, 14–30
Pts: Mosquete 10; Rebs: Monsac 6 Asts: Morton, Evangelista 3		Pts: Colhado 17; Rebs: Colhado 14; Asts: Pinto, Dantas 4

Gimnasio USBI, Xalapa

23 September 2013
18:30

Boxscore

Argentina	67–44	Dominican Republic
Scoring by quarter: 17–12, 15–9, 22–17, 13–6
Pts: Vega 21; Rebs: Vega 11; Asts: Gretter 7		Pts: Morton, Paniagua 9 Rebs: Paniagua 7 Asts: four players 2

Gimnasio USBI, Xalapa

23 September 2013
20:45

Boxscore

Mexico	60–78	Puerto Rico
Scoring by quarter: 15–16, 17–22, 16–24, 12–16
Pts: Castro 22; Rebs: Castro 15; Asts: Silva 3		Pts: Cortijo 15; Rebs: Sepúlveda 9 Asts: Cortijo 7

Gimnasio USBI, Xalapa

24 September 2013
18:30

Boxscore

Brazil	69–60	Argentina
Scoring by quarter: 18–19, 15–8, 21–18, 15–15
Pts: Dantas 14; Rebs: Dantas 13; Asts: Pinto 5		Pts: Vega 23; Rebs: Vega 7 Asts: Gretter 8

Gimnasio USBI, Xalapa

24 September 2013
20:45

Boxscore

Dominican Republic	84–77	Mexico
Scoring by quarter: 22–17, 17–20, 27–19, 18–21
Pts: Paniagua 20; Rebs: Monsac 11; Asts: Monsac 6		Pts: Castro 25; Rebs: Castro, Camacho 11; Asts: M. García 8

Gimnasio USBI, Xalapa

25 September 2013
18:30

Boxscore

Puerto Rico	84–59	Dominican Republic
Scoring by quarter: 33–12, 16–11, 23–17, 12–19
Pts: Cortijo 18; Rebs: Cortijo 9 Asts: Cortijo 6		Pts: Paniagua 21; Rebs: Mosquete 13; Asts: Morton 6

Gimnasio USBI, Xalapa

25 September 2013
20:45

Boxscore

Mexico	45–97	Brazil
Scoring by quarter: 14–23, 18–25, 7–25, 6–24
Pts: Silva 12; Rebs: Morales 6 Asts: three players 3		Pts: Ribeiro 15; Rebs: Santos 12; Asts: Ribeiro, Paixão 5

Gimnasio USBI, Xalapa

== Final round ==
Semi-finals
September 27
Canada	73
Puerto Rico	48
September 27
Brazil	68
Cuba	72

Final
September 28
Canada	71
Cuba	79
Third place
September 28
Puerto Rico	56
Brazil	66

=== Semifinals ===
27 September 2013
17:45

Boxscore

Canada	73–48	Puerto Rico
Scoring by quarter: 26–8, 13–18, 19–14, 15–8
Pts: Smith 14; Rebs: Smith 11; Asts: four players 3		Pts: Cortijo 22; Rebs: Placido 7 Asts: Sepúlveda, Cortijo 4

Gimnasio USBI, Xalapa

27 September 2013
20:00

Boxscore

Brazil	68–72	Cuba
Scoring by quarter: 15–22, 6–18, 28–15, 19–17
Pts: Pinto 15; Rebs: Colhado 12; Asts: Pinto 7		Pts: Noblet 18; Rebs: Cepeda 15; Asts: Casanova, Romero 4

Gimnasio USBI, Xalapa

=== Third place game ===
28 September 2013
17:45

Boxscore

Puerto Rico	56–66	Brazil
Scoring by quarter: 19–18, 9–20, 16–15, 12–13
Pts: Sepúlveda 21; Rebs: Sepúlveda 8 Asts: Cortijo 4		Pts: Nascimento 18; Rebs: Santos 13; Asts: Nascimento 5

Gimnasio USBI, Xalapa

=== Final ===
28 September 2013
20:00

Boxscore

Canada	71–79	Cuba
Scoring by quarter: 15–20, 15–25, 17–13, 24–21
Pts: Tatham 25; Rebs: Tatham 9 Asts: Tatham 4		Pts: Gelis 19; Rebs: Cepeda 12; Asts: Gelis 6

Gimnasio USBI, Xalapa

2013 Women's Americas winners

Cuba
4th title

== Final ranking ==
Rank	Team	Record
1st place, gold medalist(s)	Cuba	5–1
2nd place, silver medalist(s)	Canada	5–1
3rd place, bronze medalist(s)	Brazil	5–1
4	Puerto Rico	3–3
5	Argentina	2–2
6	Chile	1–3
7	Jamaica	1–3
8	Venezuela	1–3
9	Dominican Republic	1–3
10	Mexico	0–4
