= Basketball at the 2028 Summer Olympics – Women's qualification =

The women's qualification for the Olympic basketball tournament will be held between 2026 and 2028; all five FIBA (International Basketball Federation) zones are expected to have a representation in the Olympic basketball event.

As the host nation, the United States reserve a quota place in the women's basketball.

== Method ==
Twelve teams will participate in the women's basketball tournament, with each NOC sending a roster of 12 players.

=== Host nation ===
As the host nation, the United States reserved a direct quota place. However, USA won the World Cup so there will be an additional quota place at the final qualification tournament.

=== World Championships ===
The World Champion 2026 directly qualifies for the Olympics.

=== Qualification process ===
Eight teams not qualified for the 2026 FIBA Women's Basketball World Cup play in a pre-qualifying tournament in August 2026. National teams from Africa, the Americas, Asia (including Oceania) and Europe play in one of four global Olympic qualifying tournaments. Accordingly, the winning team in the pre-qualifying tournament will be qualified for the Olympic qualifying tournaments, that will take place in February 2028.

The four-way global Olympic qualifying tournaments, held in February 2028, will be contested by the following top sixteen teams across all continents based on the results from the continental championships. The three highest-ranked teams (including the host nation) from each of the four tournaments complete the women's basketball lineup.

- AfroBasket Women – two teams advanced through 2027 Women's Afrobasket
- FIBA Women's AmeriCup – four teams advanced through 2027 FIBA Women's AmeriCup
- FIBA Women's Asia Cup – four teams advanced through 2027 FIBA Women's Asia Cup
- EuroBasket Women – six teams advanced through EuroBasket Women 2027

== Qualified teams ==
The groups with USA qualify only two teams.

Qualification method	Date	Venue	Berths	Qualified team
Host nation	—N/a	—N/a	~~1~~	United States
2026 FIBA Women's Basketball World Cup	4–13 September 2026	(Germany) Berlin	1	United States
2028 FIBA Women's Olympic Qualifying Tournaments	10–13 February 2028		2 or 3	
2028 FIBA Women's Olympic Qualifying Tournaments	10–13 February 2028		2 or 3	
2028 FIBA Women's Olympic Qualifying Tournaments	10–13 February 2028		2 or 3	
2028 FIBA Women's Olympic Qualifying Tournaments	10–13 February 2028		2 or 3	
Total			12	

== FIBA Women's Olympic Pre-Qualifying Tournament ==
Eight teams will play for one spot in the qualifying tournaments.
