= 2009 FIBA Americas Championship for Women =

2009 FIBA Women's AmeriCup
10th FIBA Women's Americas Basketball Championship
- Official logo of the FIBA Americas Championship 2009

Tournament details
- Host country: Brazil
- Dates: September 23 – September 27
- Teams: 8 (from 44 federations)
- Venue: 1 (in 1 host city)

Final positions
- Champions: Brazil (4th title)

Tournament statistics
- MVP: (Brazil) Adrianinha Pinto
- Top scorer: (Venezuela) Ofelia Villarroel (19)
- Top rebounds: (Venezuela) Ofelia Villarroel (10)
- Top assists: (Brazil) Adrianinha Pinto (4.6)
- PPG (Team): Brazil (82)
- RPG (Team): Brazil (47)
- APG (Team): Brazil (22.6)

Official website
- FIBA Americas Championship for Women 2009

The FIBA Americas Championship for Women 2009 is the continental championships held by FIBA Americas for North, Central and South America and the Caribbean. The championship will serve as a qualifying tournament for the 2010 FIBA World Championship for Women in the Czech Republic. The tournament will be held on Ginásio Aecim Tocantins in Cuiabá, Brazil from September 23 to September 27.

== Preliminary round ==
=== Group A ===
| Team | Pts. | W | L | PCT | PF | PA | Diff |
|---|---|---|---|---|---|---|---|
| Brazil | 6 | 3 | 0 | 1.000 | 260 | 141 | +119 |
| Canada | 5 | 2 | 1 | 0.667 | 218 | 155 | +63 |
| Puerto Rico | 4 | 1 | 2 | 0.333 | 174 | 192 | −18 |
| Dominican Republic | 3 | 0 | 3 | 0.000 | 143 | 307 | −164 |

September 23
17:00

| Dominican Republic | 37–103 | Canada |
Scoring by quarter: 13–25, 7–30, 8–22, 9–26

Ginásio Aecim Tocantins, Cuiabá

September 23
19:00

| Puerto Rico | 34–78 | Brazil |
Scoring by quarter: 10–22, 8–21, 12–18, 4–17

Ginásio Aecim Tocantins, Cuiabá

September 24
15:00

| Canada | 70–57 | Puerto Rico |
Scoring by quarter: 11–13, 21–14, 15–13, 23–17

Ginásio Aecim Tocantins, Cuiabá

September 24
19:30

| Brazil | 121–62 | Dominican Republic |
Scoring by quarter: 36–22, 30–19, 30–16, 25–5

Ginásio Aecim Tocantins, Cuiabá

September 25
15:00

| Puerto Rico | 83–44 | Dominican Republic |
Scoring by quarter: 22–14, 21–18, 23–10, 17–12

Ginásio Aecim Tocantins, Cuiabá

September 25
19:30

| Canada | 45–61 | Brazil |
Scoring by quarter: 10–17, 8–9, 16–19, 11–16

Ginásio Aecim Tocantins, Cuiabá

=== Group B ===
| Team | Pts. | W | L | PCT | PF | PA | Diff |
|---|---|---|---|---|---|---|---|
| Argentina | 6 | 3 | 0 | 1.000 | 234 | 203 | +31 |
| Cuba | 5 | 2 | 1 | 0.667 | 270 | 200 | +70 |
| Chile | 4 | 1 | 2 | 0.333 | 194 | 225 | −31 |
| Venezuela | 3 | 0 | 3 | 0.000 | 189 | 259 | −70 |

September 23
15:00

| Chile | 60–94 | Cuba |
Scoring by quarter: 17–28, 10–13, 16–29, 17–24

Ginásio Aecim Tocantins, Cuiabá

September 23
21:00

| Venezuela | 65–87 | Argentina |
Scoring by quarter: 19–25, 17–27, 9–21, 20–14

Ginásio Aecim Tocantins, Cuiabá

September 24
17:15

| Argentina | 62–57 | Chile |
Scoring by quarter: 16–8, 12–23, 13–14, 18–12

Ginásio Aecim Tocantins, Cuiabá

September 24
21:45

| Cuba | 95–55 | Venezuela |
Scoring by quarter: 30–17, 16–10, 24–13, 25–15

Ginásio Aecim Tocantins, Cuiabá

September 25
17:15

| Chile | 77–69 | Venezuela |
Scoring by quarter: 20–15, 16–19, 16–21, 25–14

Ginásio Aecim Tocantins, Cuiabá

September 25
21:45

| Argentina | 85–81 (OT) | Cuba |
Scoring by quarter: 19–17, 18–19, 20–23, 15–13, Overtime: 13–9

Ginásio Aecim Tocantins, Cuiabá

== Knockout stage ==
=== Championship Bracket ===
Semi-finals
September 26
Brazil | 79
Cuba | 59
September 26
Argentina | 63
Canada | 53

Final
September 27
Brazil | 71
Argentina | 48
Third place
September 27
Cuba | 49
Canada | 59 (OT)

5th place bracket

Semi-finals
September 26
Puerto Rico | 74
Venezuela | 53
September 26
Chile | 72
Dominican Republic | 58

Fifth place
September 27
Puerto Rico | 61
Chile | 49
Seventh place
September 27
Venezuela | 87 (OT)
Dominican Republic | 82

=== Classification 5–8 ===
September 26
15:00

Report

| Puerto Rico | 74–53 | Venezuela |
Scoring by quarter: 11–20, 25–12, 23–13, 15–8
| Pts: M. Martinez 24; Rebs: M. Martinez 8 Asts: L. Gonzalez 4 | | Pts: C. Blanco 11; Rebs: O. Villarroel 10; Asts: O. Villarroel 3 |

Ginásio Aecim Tocantins, Cuiabá

September 26
17:15

Report

| Chile | 72–58 | Dominican Republic |
Scoring by quarter: 20–17, 17–12, 12–8, 23–21
| Pts: Z. Morrison 19; Rebs: T. Gomez 10; Asts: J. Novion 9 | | Pts: A. Paniagua 15; Rebs: S. Monsac 14; Asts: S. Monsac 5 |

Ginásio Aecim Tocantins, Cuiabá

=== Semi finals ===
September 26
19:30

Report

| Brazil | 79–59 | Cuba |
Scoring by quarter: 21–13, 15–17, 27–16, 16–13
| Pts: H. Luz 24; Rebs: A. Santos 8 Asts: A. Pinto 5 | | Pts: O. Gelis 11; Rebs: M. Cepeda 7 Asts: Romero and Fernández 3 each |

Ginásio Aecim Tocantins, Cuiabá
Attendance: 9.270

September 26
21:45

Report

| Argentina | 63–53 | Canada |
Scoring by quarter: 19–10, 9–12, 14–15, 21–16
| Pts: M. Paoletta 15; Rebs: E. Sanchez 9 Asts: P. Gatti 4 | | Pts: T. Gabriele 13; Rebs: K. Smith 7 Asts: Achonwa and Chapdelaine 2 each |

Ginásio Aecim Tocantins, Cuiabá

=== Seventh place game ===
September 27
14:30

Report

| Venezuela | 87–82 (OT) | Dominican Republic |
Scoring by quarter: 15–20, 11–17, 30–22, 18–15, Overtime: 13–8
| Pts: O. Villarroel 28; Rebs: O. Villarroel 10; Asts: M. Requeña 4 | | Pts: S. Monsac 28; Rebs: S. Monsac 13; Asts: Monsac, Frias and Paniagua 4 each |

Ginásio Aecim Tocantins, Cuiabá

=== Fifth place game ===
September 27
16:30

Report

| Puerto Rico | 61–49 | Chile |
Scoring by quarter: 19–12, 13–20, 16–6, 13–11
| Pts: M. Martinez 21; Rebs: E. Vargas 11; Asts: C. Valentin 4 | | Pts: T. Gomez 20; Rebs: T. Gomez 14; Asts: Quintana, Novion and Moya 2 each |

Ginásio Aecim Tocantins, Cuiabá

=== Third place game ===
September 27
18:30

Report

| Cuba | 49–59 (OT) | Canada |
Scoring by quarter: 13–16, 8–12, 19–6, 8–14, Overtime: 1–11
| Pts: S. Avila 13; Rebs: M. Cepeda 11; Asts: Gelis and Soria 2 each | | Pts: T. Gabriele 15; Rebs: T. Gabriele 11; Asts: T. Gabriele 3 |

Ginásio Aecim Tocantins, Cuiabá

=== Final ===
September 27
20:30

Report

| Brazil | 71–48 | Argentina |
Scoring by quarter: 7–13, 18–8, 25–14, 21–13
| Pts: S. Rocha 18; Rebs: A. Santos 16; Asts: S. Rocha 4 | | Pts: E. Sanchez 13; Rebs: Sanchez and Pavon 5 each Asts: S. Pavon 1 |

Ginásio Aecim Tocantins, Cuiabá
Attendance: 13.000

2009 Women's Americas winners

Brazil
4th title

== Final standings ==
Qualified for 2010 FIBA World Championships

| Rank | Team | Record |
|---|---|---|
| 1st place, gold medalist(s) | Brazil | 5–0 |
| 2nd place, silver medalist(s) | Argentina | 4–1 |
| 3rd place, bronze medalist(s) | Canada | 3–2 |
| 4 | Cuba | 2–3 |
| 5 | Puerto Rico | 3–2 |
| 6 | Chile | 2–3 |
| 7 | Venezuela | 1–4 |
| 8 | Dominican Republic | 0–5 |
