= Basketball at the 2017 Summer Universiade – Women's tournament =

Women's basketball at the XXIX Summer Universiade
- Venue: various
- Dates: August 21, 2017 – August 28, 2017
- Teams: 16

Medalists
| 1st place, gold medalist(s) | | Australia |
| 2nd place, silver medalist(s) | | Japan |
| 3rd place, bronze medalist(s) | | Chinese Taipei |

The women's tournament of basketball at the 2017 Summer Universiade in Taipei, Taiwan, began on August 21 and ended on August 28.

== Teams ==
| Africa | Americas | Asia | Europe | Oceania |
|---|---|---|---|---|
| Uganda | Argentina Canada; Chile; United States | Chinese Taipei Japan; South Korea | Czech Republic Hungary; Lithuania; Poland; Portugal; Russia; Sweden | Australia |

- The United States was represented by the University of Maryland, College Park.

== Preliminary round ==
| Qualified for the Final eight |
| Qualified for the Placement 9th-16th |

=== Group A ===
| Team | Pld | W | L | PF | PA | PD | Pts |
|---|---|---|---|---|---|---|---|
| Chinese Taipei | 3 | 3 | 0 | 252 | 166 | +86 | 6 |
| Sweden | 3 | 2 | 1 | 225 | 161 | +64 | 5 |
| Hungary | 3 | 1 | 2 | 184 | 202 | −18 | 4 |
| Chile | 3 | 0 | 3 | 124 | 256 | −132 | 3 |

21 August 2017
20:00 (UTC+8)

Report

| Chinese Taipei | 111–44 | Chile |
Scoring by quarter: 26–15, 31–8, 25–13, 29–8

Taipei Heping Basketball Gymnasium
Referees: S. Chebyshev (UKR), A. Csender (ROU), J. Horiuchi (JAP)

21 August 2017
17:30 (UTC+8)

Report

| Hungary | 57–85 | Sweden |
Scoring by quarter: 16–28, 13–22, 9–20, 19–15

Taipei Heping Basketball Gymnasium
Referees: G. Vitkauskas (LTU), A. Csender (ROU), J. Horiuchi (JAP)

22 August 2017
17:30 (UTC+8)

Report

| Chile | 41–63 | Hungary |
Scoring by quarter: 8–18, 15–16, 4–15, 14–14

Taipei Heping Basketball Gymnasium
Referees: S. Emlek (TUR), H.S. Carrizales (MEX), B.M. Kyambadde (UGA)

22 August 2017
17:30 (UTC+8)

Report

| Sweden | 58–65 | Chinese Taipei |
Scoring by quarter: 16–19, 18–18, 14–10, 10–18

Taipei Arena
Referees: L.D. Zalazar (ARG), A.M. Del Col (CAN), M.A. Prado (ARG)

23 August 2017
20:00 (UTC+8)

Report

| Chinese Taipei | 76–64 | Hungary |
Scoring by quarter: 26–11, 16–24, 18–16, 16–13

Taipei Arena
Referees: V. Maciulaitis (LTU), K.N. Apellaniz (USA), S. Arisawa (JAP)

23 August 2017
17:30 (UTC+8)

Report

| Sweden | 82–39 | Chile |
Scoring by quarter: 29–10, 14–11, 22–6, 17–12

Taipei Heping Basketball Gymnasium
Referees: J. Smiljanic (SRB), Y.S. An (KOR), H.M. Chang (HKG)

=== Group B ===
| Team | Pld | W | L | PF | PA | PD | Pts |
|---|---|---|---|---|---|---|---|
| Japan | 3 | 3 | 0 | 245 | 149 | +96 | 6 |
| Canada | 3 | 2 | 1 | 200 | 172 | +28 | 5 |
| Portugal | 3 | 1 | 2 | 141 | 175 | −34 | 4 |
| South Korea | 3 | 0 | 3 | 139 | 229 | −90 | 3 |

21 August 2017
15:30 (UTC+8)

Report

| Canada | 56–45 | Portugal |
Scoring by quarter: 8–12, 14–16, 22–8, 12–9

Taipei Heping Basketball Gymnasium
Referees: G. Vitkauskas (LTU), V. Györgyi (NOR), H.M. Chan (HKG)

21 August 2017
10:00 (UTC+8)

Report

| Japan | 91–47 | South Korea |
Scoring by quarter: 14–13, 25–5, 23–7, 29–22

Hsinchu Municipal Gymnasium
Referees: J.R. Chapman (USA), H.S. Carrizales (MEX), M.A. Prado (ARG)

22 August 2017
15:00 (UTC+8)

Report

| Portugal | 37–69 | Japan |
Scoring by quarter: 7–18, 14–17, 8–17, 8–17

Taipei Arena
Referees: P. Hrusa (CZE), G. Kapitany (HUN), J. Smiljanic (SRB)

22 August 2017
17:30

Report

| South Korea | 42–79 | Canada |
Scoring by quarter: 7–19, 6–19, 15–17, 14–24

Taipei Heping Basketball Gymnasium
Referees: S. Beliakov (RUS), T. Benczur (HUN), K. Apellaniz (USA)

23 August 2017
15:00 (UTC+8)

Report

| Canada | 65–85 | Japan |
Scoring by quarter: 20–18, 10–19, 14–24, 21–24

Taipei Arena
Referees: L.D. Zalazar (ARG), A. Csender (ROU), M. Proc (POL)

23 August 2017
20:00 (UTC+8)

Report

| South Korea | 50–59 | Portugal |
Scoring by quarter: 17–16, 7–16, 14–18, 12–9

Hsinchu Municipal Gymnasium
Referees: F.V. Barrera (CHI), J. Yu (TPE), B.M. Kyambadde (UGA)

=== Group C ===
| Team | Pld | W | L | PF | PA | PD | Pts |
|---|---|---|---|---|---|---|---|
| United States | 3 | 3 | 0 | 296 | 139 | +157 | 6 |
| Czech Republic | 3 | 2 | 1 | 194 | 184 | +10 | 5 |
| Poland | 3 | 1 | 2 | 193 | 216 | −23 | 4 |
| Uganda | 3 | 0 | 3 | 150 | 294 | −144 | 3 |

21 August 2017
12:30 (UTC+8)

Report

| United States | 121–34 | Uganda |
Scoring by quarter: 35–7, 33–7, 29–9, 24–11

Hsinchu Municipal Gymnasium
Referees: J.R. Chapman (USA), H.S. Carrizales (MEX), M.A. Prado (ARG)

21 August 2017
15:00 (UTC+8)

Report

| Czech Republic | 57–52 | Poland |
Scoring by quarter: 13–15, 21–15, 10–12, 13–10

Hsinchu Municipal Gymnasium
Referees: O. Lucis (LAT), A.M. Del Col (CAN), S.H. Wei (TPE)

22 August 2017
12:30 (UTC+8)

Report

| Uganda | 59–85 | Czech Republic |
Scoring by quarter: 15–25, 18–24, 11–15, 15–21

University of Taipei (Tianmu) Gymnasium
Referees: G. Vitkauskas (LTU), S.H. Chen (TPE), Y.S. An (KOR)

22 August 2017
12:30 (UTC+8)

Report

| Poland | 53–102 | United States |
Scoring by quarter: 15–31, 7–19, 16–22, 15–30

Taipei Heping Basketball Gymnasium
Referees: S. Chebyshev (UKR), S. Lee (KOR), S. Arisawa (JAP)

23 August 2017
20:00 (UTC+8)

Report

| United States | 73–52 | Czech Republic |
Scoring by quarter: 15–17, 24–15, 20–3, 14–17

Taipei Heping Basketball Gymnasium
Referees: A. Davydov (RUS), V. Györgyi (NOR), J. Smiljanic (SRB)

23 August 2017
17:30 (UTC+8)

Report

| Poland | 88–57 | Uganda |
Scoring by quarter: 26–8, 24–10, 17–19, 21–20

University of Taipei (Tianmu) Gymnasium
Referees: K. Simonov (GER), M.A. Prado (ARG), M.L. Sung (TPE)

=== Group D ===
| Team | Pld | W | L | PF | PA | PD | Pts |
|---|---|---|---|---|---|---|---|
| Russia | 3 | 3 | 0 | 189 | 167 | +22 | 6 |
| Australia | 3 | 2 | 1 | 205 | 181 | +24 | 5 |
| Lithuania | 3 | 1 | 2 | 196 | 183 | +13 | 4 |
| Argentina | 3 | 0 | 3 | 150 | 209 | −59 | 3 |

21 August 2017
17:30 (UTC+8)

Report

| Russia | 67–57 | Argentina |
Scoring by quarter: 15–19, 12–9, 29–16, 11–13

Hsinchu Municipal Gymnasium
Referees: A.M. Del Col (CAN), J. Smiljanic (SRB), S.H. Wei (TPE)

21 August 2017
20:00 (UTC+8)

Report

| Australia | 78–71 | Lithuania |
Scoring by quarter: 16–16, 26–16, 24–21, 12–18

Hsinchu Municipal Gymnasium
Referees: F.V. Barrera (CHI), K.N. Apellaniz (USA), R. Eriksson (SWE)

22 August 2017
17:30 (UTC+8)

Report

| Argentina | 47–69 | Australia |
Scoring by quarter: 8–12, 9–18, 14–12, 16–27

University of Taipei (Tianmu) Gymnasium
Referees: T. Suslov (EST), V. Györgyi (NOR), M.L. Sung (TPE)

22 August 2017
15:00 (UTC+8)

Report

| Lithuania | 52–59 | Russia |
Scoring by quarter: 11–11, 10–14, 14–17, 17–17

University of Taipei (Tianmu) Gymnasium
Referees: P. Marques (POR), N. Sanders (CAN), A. Csender (ROU)

23 August 2017
12:30 (UTC+8)

Report

| Russia | 63–58 | Australia |
Scoring by quarter: 17–17, 12–14, 14–10, 20–17

Taipei Heping Basketball Gymnasium
Referees: G.A. Todey (USA), G. Kapitany (HUN), R. Eriksson (SWE)

23 August 2017
17:30 (UTC+8)

Report

| Lithuania | 73–46 | Argentina |
Scoring by quarter: 17–6, 6–18, 26–11, 24–11

Taipei Heping Basketball Gymnasium
Referees: S. Emlek (TUR), S. Lee (KOR), H.S. Carrizales (MEX)

== Classification round ==
=== Quarterfinal round ===
==== 9th–16th place ====
25 August 2017
12:30 (UTC+8)

Report

| Hungary | 78–62 | South Korea |
Scoring by quarter: 26–10, 15–18, 16–16, 21–18

Hsinchu Municipal Gymnasium
Referees: T. Suslov (EST), K. Simonov (GER), S.A. Chiau (MOZ)

25 August 2017
10:00 (UTC+8)

Report

| Portugal | 62–31 | Chile |
Scoring by quarter: 14–2, 16–13, 19–7, 13–9

Taipei Heping Basketball Gymnasium
Referees: V. Maciulaitis (LTU), S. Emlek (TUR), S. Lee (KOR)

25 August 2017
10:00 (UTC+8)

Report

| Poland | 66–70 | Argentina |
Scoring by quarter: 15–15, 17–14, 14–24, 20–17

Hsinchu Municipal Gymnasium
Referees: T. Suslov (EST), H.M. Chan (HKG), S.A. Chiau (MOZ)

25 August 2017
10:00 (UTC+8)

Report

| Lithuania | 92–59 | Uganda |
Scoring by quarter: 28–9, 18–21, 30–13, 16–16

University of Taipei (Tianmu) Gymnasium
Referees: J. Yu (TPE), Y.S. An (KOR), K.N. Apellaniz (USA)

=== Semifinal round ===
==== 13th–16th place ====
26 August 2017
12:30 (UTC+8)

Report

| South Korea | 56–79 | Poland |
Scoring by quarter: 17–21, 9–22, 10–14, 20–22

Taipei Heping Basketball Gymnasium
Referees: R.C. Kerrison (CAN), J.A. Boyer (USA), S.H. Wei (TPE)

26 August 2017
12:30 (UTC+8)

Report

| Chile | 58–50 | Uganda |
Scoring by quarter: 22–17, 12–11, 8–10, 16–12

Taipei Arena
Referees: C.H. Chen (TPE), S. Arisawa (JAP), S.A. Chiau (MOZ)

==== 9th–12th place ====
26 August 2017
15:00 (UTC+8)

Report

| Hungary | 68–54 | Argentina |
Scoring by quarter: 16–8, 14–10, 16–12, 22–24

Taipei Heping Basketball Gymnasium
Referees: G.A. Todey (USA), J. Horiuchi (JAP), B.M. Kyambadde (UGA)

26 August 2017
15:00 (UTC+8)

Report

| Portugal | 59–54 | Lithuania |
Scoring by quarter: 11–15, 25–12, 7–15, 16–12

Taipei Arena
Referees: J.R. Chapman (AUS), G. Kapitany (HUN), M.L. Sung (TPE)

==== 5th–8th place ====
26 August 2017
17:30 (UTC+8)

Report

| Canada | 75–80 | United States |
Scoring by quarter: 16–26, 25–20, 17–11, 17–23

Taipei Heping Basketball Gymnasium
Referees: S. Chebyshev (UKR), S. Beliakov (RUS), M.A. Prado (ARG)

26 August 2017
20:00 (UTC+8)

Report

| Sweden | 85–76 | Czech Republic |
Scoring by quarter: 23–8, 25–21, 21–16, 16–31

Taipei Heping Basketball Gymnasium
Referees: T. Benczur (HUN), A. Csender (ROU), K.N. Apellaniz (USA)

== Final round ==
=== 15th place game ===
28 August 2017
10:00 (UTC+8)

Report

| South Korea | 90–88 | Uganda |
Scoring by quarter: 22–16, 15–21, 28–26, 25–25

Hsinchu Municipal Gymnasium
Referees: S. Emlek (TUR), M.L. Sung (TPE), H.M. Chan (HKG)

=== 13th place game ===
28 August 2017
10:00 (UTC+8)

Report

| Poland | 66–52 | Chile |
Scoring by quarter: 22–9, 15–18, 13–14, 16–11

University of Taipei (Tianmu) Gymnasium
Referees: G. Kapitany (HUN), J. Horiuchi (JAP), Y.S. An (KOR)

=== 11th place game ===
28 August 2017
10:00 (UTC+8)

Report

| Argentina | 89–74 | Lithuania |
Scoring by quarter: 21–21, 20–26, 26–12, 22–15

Taipei Heping Basketball Gymnasium
Referees: S. Beliakov (RUS), M. Proc (POL), S.H. Wei (TPE)

=== 9th place game ===
28 August 2017
12:30 (UTC+8)

Report

| Hungary | 54–61 | Portugal |
Scoring by quarter: 20–17, 12–11, 4–13, 18–20

Taipei Heping Gymnasium
Referees: K.N. Appelaniz (USA), S.H. Wei (TPE), S.A. Chiau (MOZ)

=== 7th place game ===
28 August 2017
10:00 (UTC+8)

Report

| Canada | 84–68 | Czech Republic |
Scoring by quarter: 17–16, 19–14, 20–18, 28–20

Taipei Arena
Referees: G.A. Todey (USA), F.V. Barrera (CHI), C.H. Chen (TPE)

=== 5th place game ===
28 August 2017
17:30 (UTC+8)

Report

| United States | 86–65 | Sweden |
Scoring by quarter: 26–17, 18–12, 20–18, 22–18

Taipei Heping Basketball Gymnasium
Referees: T. Suslov (EST), G. Vitkauskas (LTU), J.R. Chapman (AUS)

== Championship playoffs ==
Quarterfinals
A1 | Chinese Taipei | 76
B2 | Canada | 67
C1 | United States | 69
D2 | Australia | 76
B1 | Japan | 90
A2 | Sweden | 51
D1 | Russia | 69
C2 | Czech Republic | 54

Semifinals
A1 | Chinese Taipei | 74
D2 | Australia | 79
B1 | Japan | 84
D1 | Russia | 63

Gold Medal Game
D2 | Australia | 85
B1 | Japan | 78
Bronze Medal Game
A1 | Chinese Taipei | 81
D1 | Russia | 66

=== Quarterfinals ===
25 August 2017
17:30 (UTC+8)

Report

| Chinese Taipei | 76–67 | Canada |
Scoring by quarter: 18–17, 17–12, 21–17, 20–21

Taipei Arena
Referees: O. Lucis (LAT), A. Csender (ROU), J. Smiljanic (SRB)

25 August 2017
20:00 (UTC+8)

Report

| Japan | 90–51 | Sweden |
Scoring by quarter: 21–8, 29–12, 13–14, 27–17

Taipei Heping Basketball Gymnasium
Referees: P. Marques (POR), H.S. Carrizales (MEX), S. Emlek (TUR)

25 August 2017
17:30 (UTC+8)

Report

| United States | 69–76 | Australia |
Scoring by quarter: 21–13, 12–23, 12–20, 24–20

Taipei Heping Basketball Gymnasium
Referees: V. Maciulaitis (LTU), V. Györgyi (NOR), S. Lee (KOR)

25 August 2017
20 :00 (UTC+8)

Report

| Russia | 69–54 | Czech Republic |
Scoring by quarter: 23–11, 15–17, 18–16, 13–10

Taipei Arena
Referees: J.R. Chapman (AUS), A.M. Del Col (CAN), M.A. Prado (ARG)

=== Semifinals ===
26 August 2017
17:30 (UTC+8)

Report

| Chinese Taipei | 74–79 | Australia |
Scoring by quarter: 16–16, 22–18, 15–20, 21–25

Taipei Arena
Referees: P. Marques (POR), A.M. Del Colo (CAN), H.S. Carrizales (MEX)

26 August 2017
20:00 (UTC+8)

Report

| Japan | 84–63 | Russia |
Scoring by quarter: 22–12, 22–15, 20–19, 20–17

Taipei Arena
Referees: N. Saunders (CAN), V. Györgyi (NOR), J. Smiljanic (SRB)

=== Bronze medal game ===
28 August 2017
17:30 (UTC+8)

Report

| Chinese Taipei | 81–66 | Russia |
Scoring by quarter: 16–15, 17–20, 27–16, 21–15
| Pts: Chen 34; Rebs: Wang 8 Asts: Lin 6 | | Pts: Gladkova 28; Rebs: Gladkova 14; Asts: Safonova 5 |

Taipei Arena
Attendance: 14000
Referees: A.M. Del Col (CAN), V. Györgyi (NOR), M.A. Prado (ARG)

=== Gold medal game ===
28 August 2017
20:00 (UTC+8)

Report

| Australia | 85–78 | Japan |
Scoring by quarter: 24–16, 19–17, 30–18, 12–27
| Pts: Garbin 30; Rebs: Scherf 12; Asts: Garbin 6 | | Pts: Hayashi 16; Rebs: Fujimoto 5 Asts: Yasuma 8 |

Taipei Arena
Attendance: 10000
Referees: A. Csender (ROU), J. Smiljanic (SRB), H.S. Carrizales (MEX)

== Final standings ==
| Place | Team | Record |
|---|---|---|
| 1st place, gold medalist(s) | Australia | 5–1 |
| 2nd place, silver medalist(s) | Japan | 5–1 |
| 3rd place, bronze medalist(s) | Chinese Taipei | 5–1 |
| 4 | Russia | 4–2 |
| 5 | United States | 5–1 |
| 6 | Sweden | 3–3 |
| 7 | Canada | 3–3 |
| 8 | Czech Republic | 2–4 |
| 9 | Portugal | 4–2 |
| 10 | Hungary | 3–3 |
| 11 | Argentina | 2–4 |
| 12 | Lithuania | 2–4 |
| 13 | Poland | 3–3 |
| 14 | Chile | 1–5 |
| 15 | South Korea | 1–5 |
| 16 | Uganda | 0–6 |
