= Argentina national team =

Argentina national team can refer to different sports:

- Argentina national football team, male football
- Argentina women's national football team, female football
- Argentina national rugby union team (Los Pumas), male rugby union
- Argentina men's national basketball team, male basketball
- Argentina women's national basketball team, female basketball
- Argentina men's national volleyball team, male volleyball
- Argentina women's national volleyball team (Las Panteras), female volleyball
- Argentina men's national field hockey team, male field hockey
- Argentina women's national field hockey team (Las Leonas), female field hockey
