= Coliseo Municipal Antonio Azurmendy Riveros =

Indoor arena in Valdivia, Chile

Coliseo Municipal de Valdivia
- "La Catedral del Basquetbol" "The Cathedral of Basketball"
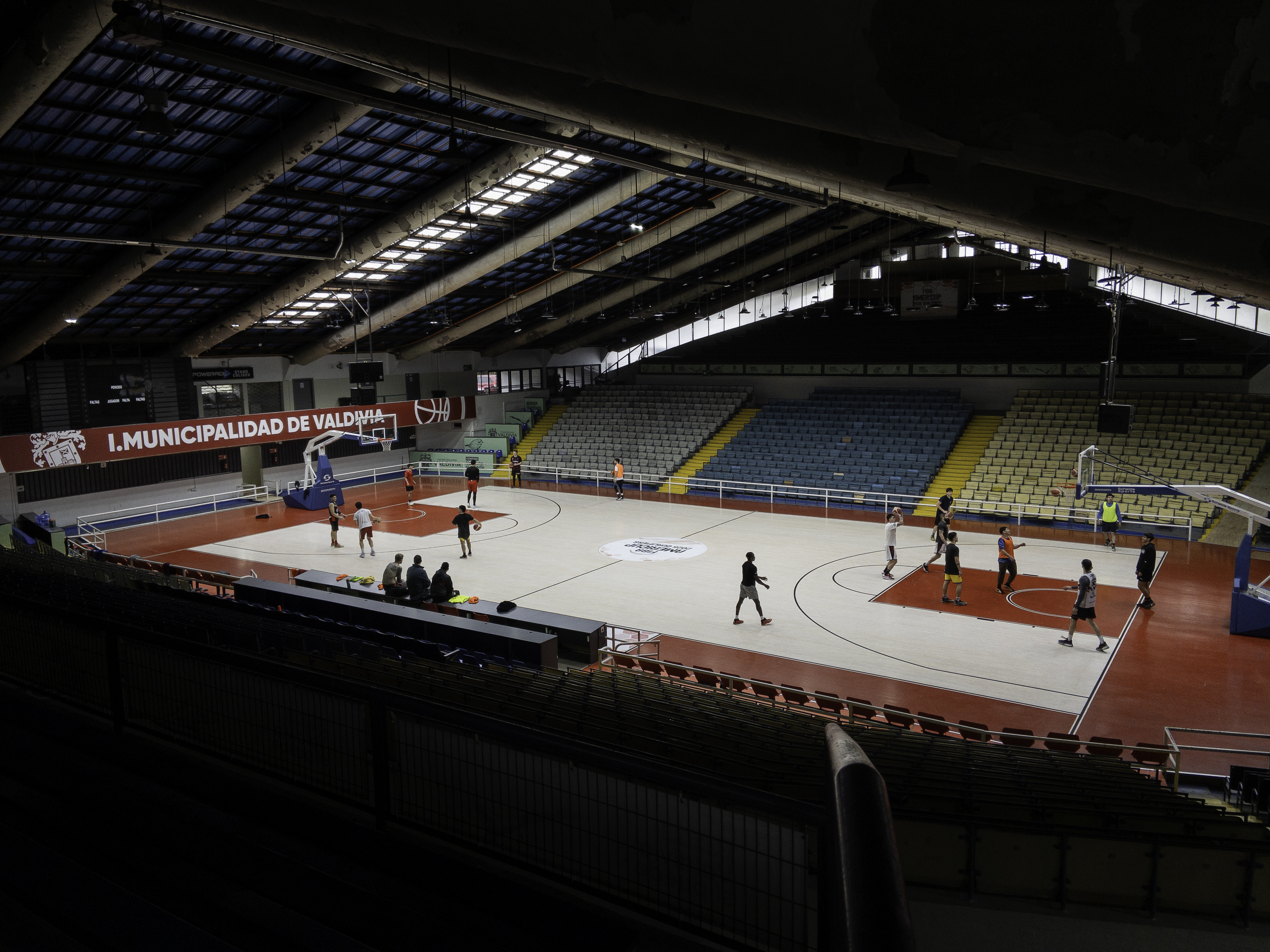
- The inside of the arena.
- Interactive map of Coliseo Municipal de Valdivia
- Full name: Coliseo Municipal Antonio Azurmendy Riveros
- Location: Valdivia, Chile
- Coordinates: 39.8199°S 73.2322°W
- Capacity: Concerts: 6,500; Basketball: 5,000

Construction
- Opened: 1966
- Renovated: 2001, 2018
- Expanded: 2001

Tenant
- CD Valdivia

The Coliseo Municipal Antonio Azurmendy Riveros, or Coliseo Municipal de Valdivia, is an indoor arena that is located in Valdivia, Chile. The arena is primarily used to host basketball games, and has a seating capacity of 5,000 people. The arena was named after Antonio Azurmendy, in 1971.

== History ==
The Coliseo was inaugurated in 1966, for the 1966 Extraordinary Men's World Basketball Championship, which featured Valdivia as one of its host sites. The arena has hosted numerous basketball tournaments, such as the men's FIBA South American Championships in 1977 and 2001. For the 2001 FIBA South American Championship, the arena was remodeled. The arena also hosted the 2002 South American Basketball Club Championship, in which the arena's host professional basketball club team, CD Valdivia, finished runners-up at the competition. The arena also hosted the 2007 FIBA AmeriCup Women.

The arena was also used to host home games of the senior men's Chilean national basketball team, during 2019 FIBA World Cup Americas qualifiers.

== Major sporting events hosted ==
- 1966 Extraordinary Basketball World Cup
- 1977 FIBA South American Championship
- 2001 FIBA South American Championship
- 2002 South American Club Basketball Championship
- 2007 FIBA AmeriCup Women
- 2019 Americas FIBA World Cup Americas qualifiers.
