= 1964 FIBA World Championship for Women =

4th FIBA World Championship for Women

Tournament details
- Host country: Peru
- Dates: 18 April to 5 May
- Teams: 13 (from 5 confederations)
- Venue: 1 (in 1 host city)

Final positions
- Champions: Soviet Union (2nd title)

Tournament statistics
- Top scorer: (South Korea) Park (20.6)
- PPG (Team): Soviet Union (75.7)

The 1964 FIBA World Championship for Women (Spanish: 1964 Campeonato Mundial FIBA Femenino) was hosted in Peru from 1964. The Soviet Union won the tournament.

== Preliminary round ==
=== Group A ===
Team	Pld	W	L	PF	PA	PD	Pts
Czechoslovakia	3	3	0	223	171	+52	6
Yugoslavia	3	2	1	186	178	+8	5
South Korea	3	1	2	216	195	+21	4
Argentina	3	0	3	156	237	−81	3

18 April

Argentina	58–87	South Korea

Arequipa, Peru

19 April

Argentina	47–78	Yugoslavia

Arequipa, Peru

19 April

South Korea	72–77 (OT)	Czechoslovakia

Arequipa, Peru

20 April

Czechoslovakia	72–51	Argentina

Arequipa, Peru

20 April

Yugoslavia	60–57	South Korea

Arequipa, Peru

21 April

Yugoslavia	48–74	Czechoslovakia

Arequipa, Peru

=== Group B ===
Team	Pld	W	L	PF	PA	PD	Pts
Bulgaria	3	3	0	175	111	+64	6
United States	3	2	1	141	128	+13	5
France	3	1	2	119	154	−35	4
Paraguay	3	0	3	99	141	−42	3

18 April

France	38–32	Paraguay

Chiclayo, Peru

19 April

France	37–48	United States

Chiclayo, Peru

19 April

Paraguay	28–49	Bulgaria

Chiclayo, Peru

20 April

Paraguay	39–54	United States

Chiclayo, Peru

20 April

France	44–74	Bulgaria

Chiclayo, Peru

21 April

United States	39–52	Bulgaria

Chiclayo, Peru

=== Group C ===
Team	Pld	W	L	PF	PA	PD	Pts
Soviet Union	3	3	0	245	125	+120	6
Brazil	3	2	1	216	163	+53	5
Chile	3	1	2	159	224	−65	4
Japan	3	0	3	144	250	−106	3

18 April

Chile	84–55	Japan

Tacna, Peru

19 April

Japan	39–86	Soviet Union

Tacna, Peru

19 April

Chile	47–78	Brazil

Tacna, Peru

20 April

Soviet Union	91–28	Chile

Tacna, Peru

20 April

Brazil	80–50	Japan

Tacna, Peru

21 April

Brazil	50–68	Soviet Union

Tacna, Peru

== Classification round ==
Team	Pld	W	L	PF	PA	PD	Pts
South Korea	5	5	0	358	267	+91	10
Japan	5	3	2	300	280	+20	8
France	5	2	3	294	297	−3	7
Chile	5	2	3	245	290	−45	7
Paraguay	5	2	3	273	293	−20	7
Argentina	5	1	4	286	329	−43	6

25 April

Chile	52–48	Japan

Iquitos, Peru

26 April

Chile	37–59	Argentina

Iquitos, Peru

26 April

France	71–63	Argentina

Iquitos, Peru

26 April

France	57–65	Japan

Iquitos, Peru

26 April

South Korea	73–49	Paraguay

Iquitos, Peru

27 April

South Korea	70–61	Japan

Iquitos, Peru

27 April

Chile	50–56	Paraguay

Iquitos, Peru

28 April

Argentina	49–66	Japan

Iquitos, Peru

28 April

Paraguay	43–54	France

Iquitos, Peru

28 April

South Korea	68–45	Chile

Iquitos, Peru

29 April

Japan	60–52	Paraguay

Iquitos, Peru

29 April

Chile	61–59	France

Iquitos, Peru

29 April

South Korea	82–59	Argentina

Iquitos, Peru

30 April

Argentina	56–73	Paraguay

Iquitos, Peru

30 April

France	53–65	South Korea

Iquitos, Peru

== Final round ==
Team	Pld	W	L	PF	PA	PD	Pts
Soviet Union	6	6	0	436	260	+176	12
Czechoslovakia	6	5	1	378	287	+91	11
Bulgaria	6	4	2	363	321	+42	10
United States	6	3	3	270	294	−24	9
Brazil	6	2	4	341	338	+3	8
Yugoslavia	6	1	5	304	354	−50	7
Peru	6	0	6	234	472	−238	6

23 April

Soviet Union	73–45	Yugoslavia

Lima, Peru

24 April

United States	31–50	Czechoslovakia

Lima, Peru

24 April

Yugoslavia	71–45	Peru

Lima, Peru

25 April

Soviet Union	70–47	Brazil

Lima, Peru

25 April

Czechoslovakia	76–63	Bulgaria

Lima, Peru

26 April

United States	59–38	Peru

Lima, Peru

26 April

Yugoslavia	52–66	Brazil

Lima, Peru

27 April

Bulgaria	60–38	Yugoslavia

Lima, Peru

27 April

Czechoslovakia	35–70	Soviet Union

Lima, Peru

28 April

Bulgaria	79–44	Peru

Lima, Peru

28 April

United States	51–43	Brazil

Lima, Peru

29 April

Soviet Union	80–41	Peru

Lima, Peru

29 April

Czechoslovakia	60–52	Yugoslavia

Lima, Peru

30 April

Bulgaria	60–49	Brazil

Lima, Peru

30 April

United States	37–71	Soviet Union

Lima, Peru

2 May

Brazil	95–36	Peru

Lima, Peru

2 May

United States	42–46	Bulgaria

Lima, Peru

3 May

Czechoslovakia	88–30	Peru

Lima, Peru

3 May

United States	50–46	Yugoslavia

Lima, Peru

4 May

Czechoslovakia	69–41	Brazil

Lima, Peru

4 May

Bulgaria	55–72	Soviet Union

Lima, Peru

== Final standings ==
#	Team
1	Soviet Union
2	Czechoslovakia
3	Bulgaria
4	United States
5	Brazil
6	Yugoslavia
7	Peru
8	South Korea
9	Japan
10	France
11	Chile
12	Paraguay
13	Argentina

== Awards ==
1964 World Championship winner

Soviet Union
Second title
