= 1993 FIBA Americas Championship for Women =

1993 FIBA Women's AmeriCup
2nd FIBA Women's Americas Basketball Championship

Tournament details
- Host country: Brazil
- Dates: 26 June – 4 July
- Teams: 8
- Venue: 1 (in 1 host city)

Final positions
- Champions: United States (1st title)

The 1993 FIBA Americas Championship for Women, was the second FIBA Americas Championship for Women regional basketball championship held by FIBA Americas, which also served as Americas qualifier for the 1994 FIBA World Championship for Women, granting berths to the top four teams in the final standings. It was held in Brazil between 26 June and 4 July 1993. Eight national teams entered the event under the auspices of FIBA Americas, the sport's regional governing body. The city of São Paulo hosted the tournament. The United States won their first title after defeating hosts Brazil in the final.

== Format ==
- Teams were split into two round-robin groups of four teams each. The top two teams from each group advanced to the second stage and qualified directly to the 1994 FIBA World Championship for Women. The second stage consisted of another round robin group of four teams, where the top two teams played an extra game for the championship, and the other two teams played for third place.
- The teams that did not advance to the second round were cross-paired (3A vs. 3B, 4A vs. 4B) and played an extra game to define fifth through eighth place in the final standings.

== Qualification ==
Eight teams qualified during the qualification tournaments held in their respective zones in 1993; two teams (USA and Canada) qualified automatically since they are the only members of the North America zone.

- North America: Canada, United States
- Caribbean and Central America:Cuba, Mexico, Puerto Rico
- South America: Argentina, Brazil, Chile

== First round ==
Advanced to the second round

=== Group A ===
Team	Pld	W	L	PF	PA	PD	Pts
United States	3	3	0	302	169	+133	6
Canada	3	2	1	246	170	+76	5
Mexico	3	1	2	162	236	−74	4
Chile	3	0	3	133	268	−135	3

26 June

United States	84–74	Canada

26 June

Mexico	64–50	Chile

27 June

Canada	89–44	Mexico

27 June

United States	121–61	Chile
Scoring by half: 61–21, 60–20

28 June

United States	97–54	Mexico

28 June

Canada	83–42	Chile
Scoring by half: 43–30, 40–12

=== Group B ===
Team	Pld	W	L	PF	PA	PD	Pts
Brazil	3	3	0	287	237	+50	6
Cuba	3	2	1	291	219	+72	5
Puerto Rico	3	1	2	196	267	−71	4
Argentina	3	0	3	222	273	−51	3

26 June

Cuba	101–64	Puerto Rico

26 June

Brazil	95–93	Argentina

27 June

Brazil	94–56	Puerto Rico
Scoring by half: 44–29, 50–27

27 June

Cuba	102–57	Argentina

28 June

Brazil	98–88	Cuba
Scoring by half: 59–53, 29–33

28 June

Puerto Rico	76–72	Argentina

== Classification stage ==
=== Fifth place ===
30 June

Mexico	64–61	Puerto Rico

=== Seventh place ===
30 June

Argentina	84–46	Chile

== Second stage ==
Team	Pld	W	L	PF	PA	PD	Pts
Brazil	3	3	0	270	238	+32	6
United States	3	2	1	257	246	+11	5
Cuba	3	1	2	241	247	−6	4
Canada	3	0	3	208	245	−37	3

30 June

Brazil	82–70	Canada
Scoring by half: 51–35, 31–35

30 June

United States	89–78	Cuba
Scoring by half: 50–40, 39–38

1 July
17:00

Brazil	89–76	Cuba

1 July

United States	76–69	Canada
Scoring by half: 33–38, 43–31

2 July

Canada	69–87	Cuba

2 July

Brazil	99–92 (OT)	United States

=== Third place ===
4 July

Canada	61–54	Cuba

=== Final ===
4 July

United States	106–92	Brazil

== Final standings ==
Qualified for the 1994 FIBA World Championship for Women

Rank	Team	Record
1st place, gold medalist(s)	United States	6–1
2nd place, silver medalist(s)	Brazil	6–1
3rd place, bronze medalist(s)	Canada	3–4
4	Cuba	3–4
5	Mexico	2–2
6	Puerto Rico	1–3
7	Argentina	1–3
8	Chile	0–4
