= Mexico women's national basketball team =

Mexico
- FIBA ranking: 31 ▼1 (18 March 2026)
- FIBA zone: FIBA Americas
- National federation: Asociación Deportiva Mexicana de Básquetbol
- Coach: Lindsey Harding

World Cup
- Appearances: 3

FIBA Women's AmeriCup
- Appearances: 12
Home	Away

The Mexico women's national basketball team, is controlled by the Asociación Deportiva Mexicana de Baloncesto ADEMEBA Mexican Basketball Association and represents Mexico in international competitions.

== Honours ==
=== Pan American Games ===
Silver Medal 1975 2011

=== Centrobasket ===
Gold Medal 1973 1977

Silver Medal 1971 1975 1981 1985 1993 2001 2006

Bronze Medal 1989 1999 2010

=== FIBA COCABA Championship ===
Gold Medal 2009 2013 2015 2025

Bronze Medal 2004

== Tournament record ==
=== FIBA World Championship ===
- 1953 – 8th place
- 1957 – 8th place
- 1975 – 6th place

=== FIBA Americas Championship ===
- 1989 – 7th place
- 1993 – 5th place
- 1999 – 4th place
- 2001 – 6th place
- 2003 – 4th place
- 2007 – 7th place
- 2011 – 6th place
- 2013 – 10th place
- 2017 – 10th place
- 2019 – 9th place
- 2023 – 8th place
- 2025 – 7th place
- 2027 – Qualified

== Team ==
=== Current roster ===
Roster for the 2025 FIBA Women's AmeriCup.

Mexico women's national basketball team roster
Players
Coaches

Pos.	No.	Name	Age – Date of birth	Height	Club	Ctr.
F	2	Anisa Jeffreis	21 – 13 April 2004	1.81 m (5 ft 11 in)	Borregos Salvajes	(Mexico)
G	5	Karina Esquer	23 – 20 September 2001	1.68 m (5 ft 6 in)	Borregos Salvajes	(Mexico)
F	6	Mariana Valenzuela	22 – 1 April 2003	1.88 m (6 ft 2 in)	Seton Hall Pirates	(United States)
SF	7	Karla Martínez	25 – 7 June 2000	1.80 m (5 ft 11 in)	Panteras de Aguascalientes	(Mexico)
F	10	Claudia Ramos	27 – 27 August 1997	1.83 m (6 ft 0 in)	Fuerza Regia de Monterrey	(Mexico)
F	11	Gabriela Jaquez	21 – 19 November 2003	1.83 m (6 ft 0 in)	UCLA	(United States)
C	13	Myriam Lara (C)	30 – 22 July 1994	1.88 m (6 ft 2 in)	KB Tirana	(Albania)
PG	14	Alexia Lagunas	27 – 24 April 1998	1.75 m (5 ft 9 in)	El Calor de Cancún	(Puerto Rico)
PG	22	Hazel Ramírez	33 – 7 June 1992	1.67 m (5 ft 6 in)	Libélulas de CDMX	(Mexico)
G	31	Mayra Gil	21 – 13 December 2003	1.74 m (5 ft 9 in)	Freseros de Irapuato	(Mexico)
F	33	Ariadna Vidales	18 – 21 March 2007	1.77 m (5 ft 10 in)
PG	44	Katia Gallegos	23 – 23 August 2001	1.68 m (5 ft 6 in)	Adelitas de Chihuahua	(Mexico)

Head coach

- (United States) Desralee Abeyta

Assistant coach(es)

- (United States) David Elliott

Legend

- (C) Team captain
- Club – describes last
  club before the tournament
- Age – describes age
  on 28 June 2025

=== Head coaches ===
- (United States) Lindsey Harding – 2022–2025
- (United States) Desralee Abeyta – 2025

== See also ==
- Mexico women's national under-19 basketball team
- Mexico women's national under-17 basketball team
- Mexico women's national 3x3 team
