= Adriana Moisés Pinto =

Brazilian basketball player (born 1978)

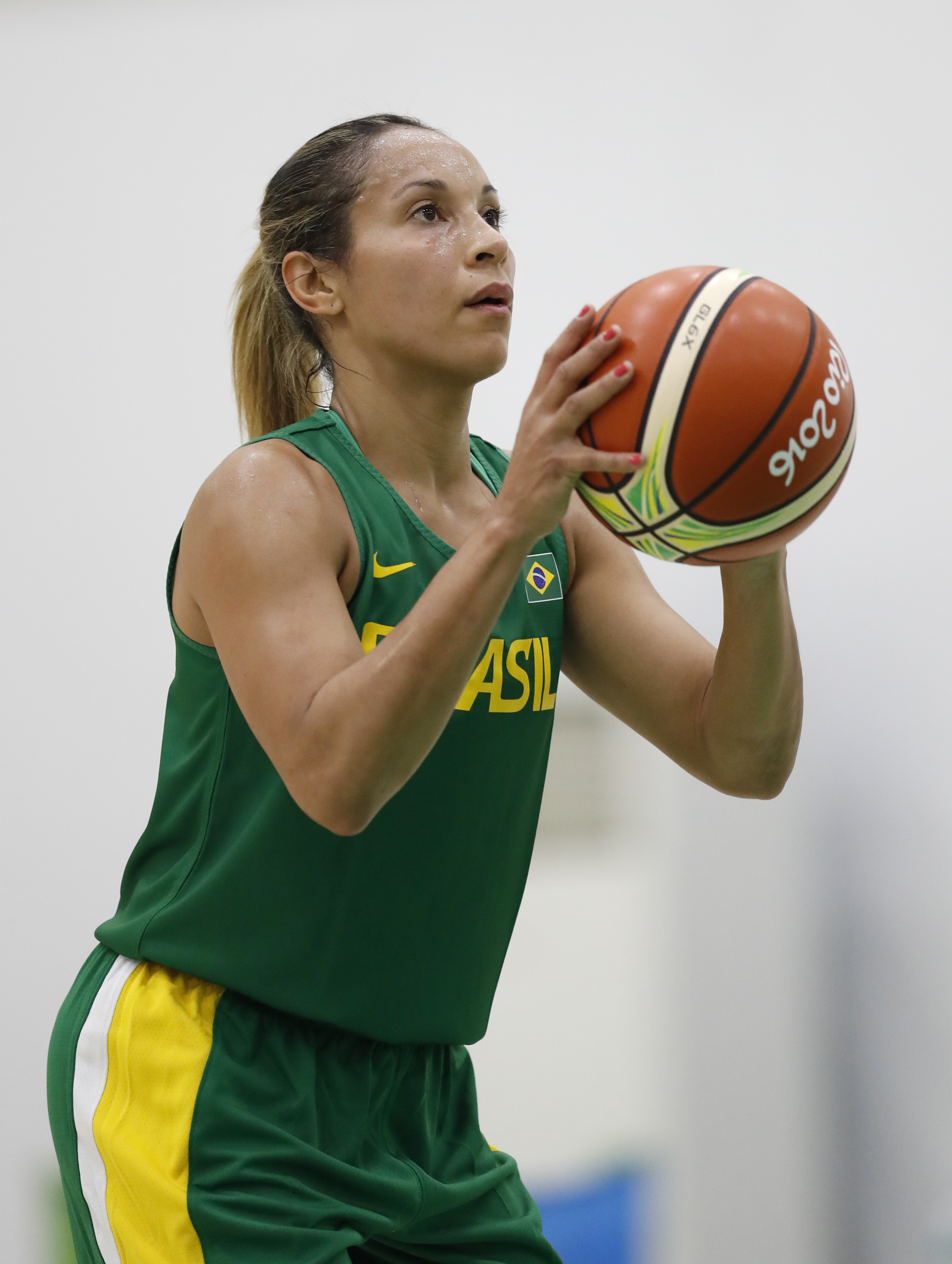

No. 4 – América Basquete
- Position: Point guard
- League: LBF

Personal information
- Born: December 6, 1978 (age 47) Franca, Brazil
- Listed height: 1.70 m (5 ft 7 in)
- Stats at Basketball Reference

Adriana "Adrianinha" Moisés Pinto (born December 6, 1978) is a Brazilian female basketball player. She spent 17 years with the Brazil women's national basketball team, from 1997 to 2016.

== International career ==
Among her accomplishments with the national team are participations in four Summer Olympics, winning a bronze at the 2000 edition in Sydney, four World Championship appearances – with her best position being a fourth place at home in 2006 – and titles in American and South American championships. Moisés retired from the national team following the 2014 FIBA World Championship for Women, expressing an interest in becoming a basketball coach. However, coach Antonio Carlos Barbosa invited her in late 2015 to join the team that was preparing for the 2016 Olympics in Rio de Janeiro, and Moisés felt interested in representing Brazil at home.

== Professional career ==
On a club level, Moisés played in 2001 and 2002 for the WNBA's Phoenix Mercury, and was waived by the team prior to the 2007 season. She has also played in Italy, Russia and Croatia.

== Career statistics ==
Legend
GP	Games played	GS	Games started	MPG	Minutes per game	RPG	Rebounds per game
APG	Assists per game	SPG	Steals per game	BPG	Blocks per game	PPG	Points per game
TO	Turnovers per game	FG%	Field-goal percentage	3P%	3-point field-goal percentage	FT%	Free-throw percentage
**Bold**	Career best	°	League leader

=== WNBA ===
WNBA regular season statistics
Year	Team	GP	GS	MPG	FG%	3P%	FT%	RPG	APG	SPG	BPG	TO	PPG
2001	Phoenix	7	0	17.6	.389	.333	.750	**2.3**	2.4	**0.9**	0.0	**2.3**	5.9
2002	Phoenix	**32**	**4**	**19.3**	.384	.288	.800	1.9	**2.5**	**0.9**	**0.1**	**2.3**	**6.0**
2003	Did not appear in league												
2004	Did not appear in league												
2005	Did not appear in league												
2006	Did not appear in league												
2007	Phoenix	4	0	7.8	**.400**	**1.000**	**1.000**	1.8	0.8	0.8	0.0	2.5	1.8
**Career**	3 years, 1 team	43	4	18.0	.385	.304	.797	1.9	2.3	0.9	0.1	2.3	5.6

== Personal life ==
Moises has a daughter, Aaliyah (b. 2006), from a relationship with A. J. Guyton.

== See also ==
- List of athletes with the most appearances at Olympic Games
