= Ginásio Aecim Tocantins =

Multi-sport gymnasium in Cuiabá/MT

- Interactive map of Ginásio Aecim Tocantins
- Full name: Ginásio Aecim Tocantins
- Location: Cuiabá, Brazil
- Coordinates: 15°36′19″S 56°7′25″W
- Capacity: 11,000

Construction
- Opened: 31 May 2007

Ginásio Aecim Tocantins is an indoor sporting arena located in Cuiabá, Brazil. The capacity of the arena is 11,000 spectators. It hosts indoor sporting events such as basketball, concerts, futsal, handball, judo, table tennis and volleyball. It is used mostly for volleyball matches.

== See also ==
- List of indoor arenas in Brazil
