= 2029 FIBA Women's AmeriCup =

Basketball tournament

Tournament details
- Host country: Nicaragua
- City: Managua
- Dates: 30 June – 8 July
- Teams: 10 (from 1 confederation)
- Venue: 1 (in 1 host city)

The 2029 FIBA Women's AmeriCup will be the 20th edition of the biannual Americas continental championship in women's basketball, sanctioned by the FIBA Americas, for women's national basketball teams. It will be held from 30 June to 8 July 2029 in Managua, Nicaragua, marking the second time the competition will be in Central America, after 2027.

The winner will qualify for the 2030 FIBA Women's Basketball World Cup in Japan, Alongside the winner, the five teams will qualify for the qualifying tournaments for the World Cup.

== Host selection ==
On 18 July 2026, Nicaragua was awarded the tournament. This will be Nicaragua's first time hosting the event.

== Qualification ==
Qualifying tournaments will be played between July 2027 and August 2028, consisting of four tournaments; teams from Central America and the Caribbean compete in the 2027 FIBA COCABA Championship for Women and the 2027 FIBA Women's Caribbean Championship, respectively, which will also serve as pre-qualifiers for the 2028 Centrobasket. South American teams will compete in the 2028 South American Championship. Nicaragua as host are given an automatic qualification.

Qualification	Host	Dates	Vacancies	Qualified
Host	(United States) Miami	18 July 2026	1	Nicaragua
Automatic entry	TBD	TBD	2	
2028 Centrobasket Women	TBD	July 2028	3	
2028 South American Championship	TBD	August 2028	4	

=== Summary of qualified teams ===
Team	Qualification method	Date of qualification	Appearance(s)				Previous best performance (Note: Bold text indicates they hosted that edition.)	WR (Note: World ranking at start of tournament.)
Team	Qualification method	Date of qualification	Total	First	Last	Streak	Previous best performance	WR
Nicaragua	Host nation	18 July 2026	1st			1	Debut	TBD

== Venue ==
The venue for the entire competition will be the Polideportivo Alexis Argüello in Nicaragua's capital, Managua. The venue has hosted numerous basketball tournaments, including the 2025 FIBA COCABA Championship for Women, 2025 FIBA AmeriCup and 2026 Centrobasket Women. Other competitions held in the arena include Basketball, Boxing and Volleyball at the 2017 Central American Games and the 2024 CONCACAF Futsal Championship.

2029 FIBA Women's AmeriCup is located in Nicaragua	Managua
2029 FIBA Women's AmeriCup is located in Nicaragua	Polideportivo Alexis Argüello
2029 FIBA Women's AmeriCup is located in Nicaragua	Capacity: 8,000
