= 2003 FIBA Americas Championship for Women =

2003 FIBA Women's AmeriCup
7th FIBA Women's Americas Basketball Championship

Tournament details
- Host country: Mexico
- Dates: 17 — 21 September 2003
- Teams: 7 (from 1 federation)
- Venue: 1 (in 1 host city)

Final positions
- Champions: Brazil (3rd title)

Official website
- 2007 FIBA Americas Championship for Women

The 2003 FIBA Americas Championship for Women (also known as 2003 Panamerican Olympic Qualifying Tournament for Women) was the qualifying tournament for FIBA Americas at the women's basketball tournament at the 2004 Summer Olympics in Athens, Greece. The tournament was held in Culiacan, Mexico from 17 – 21 September 2003. Seven national teams entered the event under the auspices of FIBA Americas, the sport's regional governing body. The city of Culiacan hosted the tournament. Brazil won their third title after defeating Cuba in the final.

== Preliminary round ==
Advanced to the semifinals

=== Group A ===
Team	Pld	W	L	PF	PA	PD	Pts
Brazil	2	2	0	216	98	+118	4
Mexico	2	1	1	107	167	−60	3
Chile	2	0	2	98	156	−58	2

=== Group B ===
Team	Pld	W	L	PF	PA	PD	Pts
Cuba	3	3	0	258	171	+87	6
Canada	3	2	1	212	168	+44	5
Argentina	3	1	2	218	209	+9	4
Dominican Republic	3	0	3	158	298	−140	3

== Semifinal ==
Championship round
20 September
Brazil	71
Canada	65
20 September
Mexico	49
Cuba	76

Final
21 September
Cuba	81
Brazil	90
Third Place
21 September
Canada	71
Mexico	34

20 September

Dominican Republic	60–81	Chile

20 September

Canada	65–71	Brazil

20 September

Mexico	49–76	Cuba

== Final Round ==
=== Fifth Place ===
21 September

Chile	46–85	Argentina

=== Third place game ===
21 September

Mexico	34–71	Canada

=== Final ===
21 September

Cuba	81–90	Brazil
Scoring by quarter: 23–19, 20–26, 18–19, 23–23

2003 Champions of the Americas

Brazil
Third title

== Final standings ==
Qualified for the 2004 Summer Olympics

Rank	Team	Record
1st place, gold medalist(s)	Brazil	4–0
2nd place, silver medalist(s)	Cuba	4–1
3rd place, bronze medalist(s)	Canada	3–2
4	Mexico	1–3
5	Argentina	2–2
6	Chile	1–3
7	Dominican Republic	0–4
