= FIBA Women's AmeriCup =

Basketball tournament for national teams from the Western Hemisphere

- Upcoming season or competition: 2027 FIBA Women's AmeriCup
- Formerly: FIBA Americas Championship for Women
- Sport: Basketball
- Founded: 1989; 37 years ago
- First season: 1989
- Organizing body: FIBA Americas
- No. of teams: 10
- Country: FIBA Americas member nations
- Continent: Americas
- Most recent champions: United States (5th title)
- Most titles: Brazil (6 titles)
- Related competitions: Centrobasket; South American Women's Basketball Championship
- Website: FIBA Women's AmeriCup

The FIBA Women's AmeriCup (previously known as the FIBA Americas Championship for Women) is the Americas women's basketball championship that take place every two years between national teams of the Western Hemisphere continents. The Women's AmeriCup is also a qualifying tournament for the FIBA Women's World Cup.

Since FIBA organized the entire Western Hemisphere west of the Atlantic Ocean under one zone, countries from North America, Central America, the Caribbean and South America compete in this tournament.

The competition was first held in 1989, and is played biennially. Brazil has the most titles in the tournament's history with six.

== Summary ==
Year	Host	Gold medal game			Bronze medal game		
Year	Host	Gold	Score	Silver	Bronze	Score	Fourth place
1989; Details	Brazil (São Paulo)	Cuba	87–84	Brazil	Canada	71–63	United States
1993; Details	Brazil (São Paulo)	United States	106–92	Brazil	Canada	61–54	Cuba
1995; Details	Canada (Hamilton)	Canada	80–73	Cuba	Puerto Rico	Based on standings	Argentina
1997; Details	Brazil (São Paulo)	Brazil	101–95	United States	Cuba	81–77	Argentina
1999; Details	Cuba (Havana)	Cuba	90–87	Brazil	Canada	80–37	Mexico
2001; Details	Brazil (São Luís)	Brazil	88–83	Cuba	Argentina	Based on standings	Canada
2003; Details	Mexico (Culiacán)	Brazil	90–81	Cuba	Canada	71–34	Mexico
2005; Details	Dominican Republic (Hato Mayor)	Cuba	81–73	Brazil	Canada	Based on standings	Argentina
2007; Details	Chile (Valdivia)	United States	101–71	Cuba	Brazil	73–41	Argentina
2009; Details	Brazil (Cuiabá)	Brazil	71–48	Argentina	Canada	59–49 OT	Cuba
2011; Details	Colombia (Neiva)	Brazil	74–33	Argentina	Canada	59–46	Cuba
2013; Details	Mexico (Xalapa)	Cuba	79–71	Canada	Brazil	66–56	Puerto Rico
2015; Details	Canada (Edmonton)	Canada	82–66	Cuba	Argentina	66–59	Brazil
2017; Details	Argentina (Buenos Aires)	Canada	67–65	Argentina	Puerto Rico	75–68	Brazil
2019; Details	Puerto Rico (San Juan)	United States	67–46	Canada	Brazil	95–66	Puerto Rico
2021; Details	Puerto Rico (San Juan)	United States	74–59	Puerto Rico	Brazil	87–82	Canada
2023; Details	Mexico (León)	Brazil	69–58	United States	Canada	80–73	Puerto Rico
2025; Details	Chile (Santiago)	United States	92–84	Brazil	Canada	76–75 ^{(2OT)}	Argentina
2027; Details	El Salvador (San Salvador)		–			–	
2029; Details	Nicaragua (Managua)		–			–	

== Performances by nation ==
Rank	Nation	Gold	Silver	Bronze	Total
1	Brazil	6	5	4	15
2	United States	5	2	0	7
3	Cuba	4	5	1	10
4	Canada	3	2	9	14
5	Argentina	0	3	2	5
6	Puerto Rico	0	1	2	3
Totals (6 entries)		18	18	18	54

== Tournament awards ==
Most recent award winners (2025)

Year	Winner
2025	(United States) Mikayla Blakes

Year	Player	Position	Team
2025	Mikayla Blakes	Guard	United States
2025	Hannah Hidalgo	Guard	United States
2025	Syla Swords	Guard	Canada
2025	Kamilla Cardoso	Center	Brazil
2025	Damiris Dantas	Center	Brazil

== Participating nations ==
Nation	(Brazil) 1989	(Brazil) 1993	(Canada) 1995	(Brazil) 1997	(Cuba) 1999	(Brazil) 2001	(Mexico) 2003	(Dominican Republic) 2005	(Chile) 2007	(Brazil) 2009	(Colombia) 2011	(Mexico) 2013	(Canada) 2015	(Argentina) 2017	(Puerto Rico) 2019	(Puerto Rico) 2021	(Mexico) 2023	(Chile) 2025	(El Salvador) 2027	(Nicaragua) 2029	Total
Argentina	5th	7th	4th	4th	5th	3rd	5th	4th	4th	2nd	2nd	5th	3rd	2nd	8th	DQ	7th	4th	Q		18
Brazil	2nd	2nd	–	1st	2nd	1st	1st	2nd	3rd	1st	1st	3rd	4th	4th	3rd	3rd	1st	2nd	Q		18
Canada	3rd	3rd	1st	5th	3rd	4th	3rd	3rd	5th	3rd	3rd	2nd	1st	1st	2nd	4th	3rd	3rd	Q		19
Chile	–	8th	5th	–	–	5th	6th	–	6th	6th	10th	6th	8th	–	–	–	–	9th	–		10
Colombia	–	–	–	6th	–	–	–	–	–	–	7th	–	–	7th	5th	5th	5th	5th	Q		8
Cuba	1st	4th	2nd	3rd	1st	2nd	2nd	1st	2nd	4th	4th	1st	2nd	8th	6th	–	9th	–	–		16
Dominican Republic	6th	–	–	8th	6th	–	7th	6th	–	8th	–	9th	10th	–	7th	8th	10th	8th	Q		13
Ecuador	–	–	–	–	–	–	–	–	–	–	–	–	7th	–	–	–	–	–	–		1
El Salvador	–	–	–	–	–	–	–	–	–	–	–	–	–	–	–	9th	–	10th	Q		3
Jamaica	–	–	–	–	–	–	–	–	8th	–	8th	7th	–	–	–	–	–	–	–		3
Mexico	7th	5th	–	–	4th	6th	4th	–	7th	–	6th	10th	–	10th	9th	–	8th	7th	Q		13
Nicaragua	–	–	–	–	–	–	–	–	–	–	–	–	–	–	–	–	–	–	–	Q	1
Paraguay	–	–	–	–	–	–	–	–	–	–	9th	–	–	6th	10th	–	–	–	–		3
Peru	8th	–	–	–	–	–	–	–	–	–	–	–	–	–	–	–	–	–	–		1
Puerto Rico	–	6th	3rd	7th	7th	–	–	5th	–	5th	5th	4th	6th	3rd	4th	2nd	4th	6th	Q		15
United States	4th	1st	–	2nd	–	–	–	–	1st	–	–	–	–	–	1st	1st	2nd	1st	Q		9
Venezuela	–	–	–	–	8th	–	–	–	–	7th	–	8th	5th	9th	–	7th	6th	–	Q		8
Virgin Islands	–	–	–	–	–	–	–	–	–	–	–	–	9th	5th	–	6th	–	–	–		3
Total	8	8	5	8	8	6	7	6	8	8	10	10	10	10	10	10	10	10	10	10	

== Debut of teams ==
A total of 18 national teams have appeared in at least one FIBA Women's AmeriCup in the history of the tournament through the 2029 competition. Each successive AmeriCup has had at least one team appearing for the first time. Countries competing in their first AmeriCup are listed below by year.

Year	Debutants	Number
1989	Argentina, Brazil, Canada, Cuba, Dominican Republic, Mexico, Peru, United States	8
1993	Chile, Puerto Rico	10
1995	None	10
1997	Colombia	11
1999	Venezuela	12
2001	None	12
2003	None	12
2005	None	12
2007	Jamaica	13
2009	None	13
2011	Paraguay	14
2013	None	14
2015	Ecuador, Virgin Islands	16
2017	None	16
2019	None	16
2021	El Salvador	17
2023	None	17
2025	None	17
2027	None	17
2029	Nicaragua	18
Total		18

== See also ==
- FIBA AmeriCup (FIBA Americas men's championship)
- FIBA Women's Basketball World Cup
