= Sílvia Cristina Rocha =

Brazilian basketball player (born 1982)

Sílvia Cristina Gustavo Rocha (born 14 May 1982) is a Brazilian former basketball player who competed in the 2004 Summer Olympics.
