= 1995 FIBA Americas Championship for Women =

1995 FIBA Women's AmeriCup
3rd FIBA Women's Americas Basketball Championship

Tournament details
- Host country: Canada
- Dates: June 22–29
- Teams: 5
- Venue: 1 (in 1 host city)

Final positions
- Champions: Canada (1st title)

The 1995 FIBA Americas Championship for Women, was the third FIBA Americas Championship for Women regional basketball championship held by FIBA Americas, which also served as Americas qualifier for the 1996 Summer Olympics, granting berths to the champion and runner-up. It was held in Canada between June 22 and June 29, 1995. Five national teams entered the event under the auspices of FIBA Americas, the sport's regional governing body. The city of Hamilton hosted the tournament. Canada won their first title after defeating hosts Cuba in the final.

== Format ==
- The preliminary stage consisted of a single round-robin group. The top four teams advanced to the knockout semifinals, where the winners qualified directly to the 1996 Summer Olympics. The winners from the semifinals competed for the championship. There was no third place game.

== First round ==
Advanced to the semifinals

Team	Pld	W	L	PF	PA	PD	Pts
Cuba	4	4	0	383	228	+155	8
Canada	4	3	1	353	213	+140	7
Puerto Rico	4	2	2	229	303	−74	6
Argentina	4	1	3	214	307	−93	5
Chile	4	0	4	209	337	−128	4

Argentina	48–67	Puerto Rico
Scoring by half: 25–25, 23–42

Chile	42–91	Canada
Scoring by half: 20–44, 22–47

Cuba	94–61	Argentina
Scoring by half: 50–21, 44–40

Puerto Rico	46–97	Canada
Scoring by half: 28–42, 18–55

Argentina	66–64	Chile
Scoring by half: 39–36, 27–28

Puerto Rico	43–96	Cuba
Scoring by half: 24–44, 19–52

Chile	62–73	Puerto Rico
Scoring by half: 27–32, 35–41

Canada	83–86	Cuba
Scoring by half: 43–48, 40–38

Canada	82–39	Argentina
Scoring by half: 39–25, 43–14

Cuba	107–41	Chile
Scoring by half: 62–17, 45–24

== Knockout stage ==
Semi-finals
Cuba	90
Argentina	32
Canada	70
Puerto Rico	41

Final
Cuba	73
Canada	80

=== Semifinals ===
Cuba	90–32	Argentina
Scoring by half: 42–12, 48–20

Canada	70–41	Puerto Rico
Scoring by half: 33–19, 37–22

=== Final ===
Cuba	73–80	Canada
Scoring by half: 45–32, 28–48

== Final standings ==
Qualified for the 1996 Summer Olympics

Rank	Team	Record
1st place, gold medalist(s)	Canada	5–1
2nd place, silver medalist(s)	Cuba	5–1
3rd place, bronze medalist(s)	Puerto Rico	2–3
4	Argentina	1–4
5	Chile	0–4
