= Ziomara Morrison =

Chilean professional basketball player (born 1989)

No. 27 – Rapid București
- Position: Center

Personal information
- Born: February 15, 1989 (age 37) Pedro Aguirre Cerda, Santiago, Chile
- Listed height: 6 ft 4 in (1.93 m)

Career information
- College: Basket UC
- Playing career: 2007–present

Career history
- 2007–2008: Banco di Sicilia Ribera
- 2008–2009: Sedis Bàsquet
- 2009–2010: CB Aros
- 2010–2012: CB Ciudad de Burgos
- 2012: San Antonio Silver Stars
- 2012–2013: Rivas Ecópolis
- 2013–2014: Ceyhan Belediyespor
- 2014: Indiana Fever
- 2014: Básquetbol UACh
- 2014: Los Leones de Quilpué
- 2014–2015: Beşiktaş JK
- 2015: Los Leones de Quilpué
- 2015–2016: Osmaniye GSK
- 2016–2017: TS Wisła
- 2017–2018: Osmaniye GSK
- 2018: Skallagrímur
- 2018: Sampaio Basquete
- 2018: Los Leones de Quilpué
- 2018–2019: Artego Bydgoszcz
- 2019: Los Leones de Quilpué
- 2019–2020: Aluinvent DVTK Miskolc
- 2020–2021: Nantes-Rezé
- 2021: Roche Vendée
- 2021–2023: Kangoeroes Mechelen
- 2023: Gimnástico Viña del Mar
- 2023: Olympiacos
- 2024: Flammes Carolo
- 2025: Escuela Alemana Paillaco
- 2025: Hapoel Lev Jerusalem
- 2026–: Rapid București

Career highlights
- Chilean League champion (2019)
- Stats at WNBA.com
- Stats at Basketball Reference
Medals
Representing Chile
Women's basketball
Pan American Games
Bronze medal – third place	Santiago 2023	Women's 3x3
South American Championship
Bronze medal – third place	Mendoza 2013	Team competition
Bolivarian Games
Gold medal – first place	2024 Ayacucho	Women's team

Ziomara Esket Morrison Jara (born February 15, 1989) is a Chilean professional basketball player for Romanian club Rapid București. In 2012, she became the first Chilean to play in the WNBA when she was a member of the San Antonio Stars.

== Career ==
Born in Pedro Aguirre Cerda commune, Santiago, Chile, Morrison joined Basket UC at the age of 11. At the age of 15, she moved to Italy and joined Banco di Sicilia Ribera.

In February 2012, Morrison signed with the San Antonio Stars. She was released by the team in May 2013, after an injury to Becky Hammon forced the club to sign another player. She returned to the WNBA with Indiana Fever in 2014.

In January 2018, Morrison signed with Skallagrímur of the Úrvalsdeild kvenna ahead of its game in the semi-finals of the Icelandic Women's Basketball Cup. In the semi-finals, Skallagrímur lost to Njarðvík despite Morrison's 25 points and 15 rebounds.

In 2023, Morrison played for Greek team Olympiacos and switched to French team Flammes Carolo the next year.

In 2025, Morrison joined Escuela Alemana from Paillaco in her homeland. In September of the same year, she moved to Israel and joined Hapoel Lev Jerusalem.

On 25 March 2026, Morrison joined Romanian club Rapid București.

== Personal life ==
Her father, Rodolfo, is a Panamanian former basketball player at the DIMAYOR in the 1980's.

== Career statistics ==
Legend
GP	Games played	GS	Games started	MPG	Minutes per game	RPG	Rebounds per game
APG	Assists per game	SPG	Steals per game	BPG	Blocks per game	PPG	Points per game
TO	Turnovers per game	FG%	Field-goal percentage	3P%	3-point field-goal percentage	FT%	Free-throw percentage
**Bold**	Career best	°	League leader

=== WNBA ===
WNBA regular season statistics
Year	Team	GP	GS	MPG	FG%	3P%	FT%	RPG	APG	SPG	BPG	TO	PPG
2012	San Antonio	30	0	5.5	.423	.600	.818	1.2	0.1	0.1	0.1	0.4	2.0
**Career**	1 year, 1 team	30	0	5.5	.423	.600	.818	1.2	0.1	0.1	0.1	0.4	2.0
