= 1997 FIBA Americas Championship for Women =

1997 FIBA Women's AmeriCup
4th FIBA Women's Americas Basketball Championship

Tournament details
- Host country: Brazil
- Dates: 5–10 August
- Teams: 8
- Venue: 1 (in 1 host city)

Final positions
- Champions: Brazil (1st title)

The 1997 FIBA Americas Championship for Women, was the fourth FIBA Americas Championship for Women regional basketball championship held by FIBA Americas, which also served as Americas qualifier for the 1998 FIBA World Championship for Women, granting berths to the top four teams in the final standings. It was held in Brazil between 5 August and 10 August 1997. Eight national teams entered the event under the auspices of FIBA Americas, the sport's regional governing body. The city of São Paulo hosted the tournament. Brazil won their first title after defeating the United States in the final.

== Format ==
- Teams were split into two round-robin groups of four teams each. The top two teams from each group advanced to the second stage and qualified directly to the 1998 FIBA World Championship for Women. The second stage consisted of another round-robin group of four teams, where the top two teams played an extra game for the championship, and the other two teams played for third place. The results between teams from the same group are carried over to the first round.
- The teams that did not advance to the second round were cross-paired (3A vs. 3B, 4A vs. 4B) and played an extra game to define fifth through eighth place in the final standings.

== First round ==
Advanced to the second round

=== Group A ===
Team	Pld	W	L	PF	PA	PD	Pts
Brazil	3	3	0	365	233	+132	6
Cuba	3	2	1	307	250	+57	5
Colombia	3	1	2	198	277	−79	4
Puerto Rico	3	0	3	203	313	−110	3

5 August

Cuba	103–66	Puerto Rico

5 August

Brazil	114–55	Colombia

6 August

Cuba	98–69	Colombia

6 August

Brazil	136–72	Puerto Rico

7 August

Colombia	74–65	Puerto Rico

7 August

Brazil	115–106	Cuba

=== Group B ===
Team	Pld	W	L	PF	PA	PD	Pts
United States	3	3	0	193	119	+74	6
Argentina	3	2	1	213	222	−9	5
Canada	3	1	2	260	239	+21	4
Dominican Republic	3	0	3	152	238	−86	3

5 August

Argentina	70–66	Canada

5 August

United States	20–0	Dominican Republic

6 August

United States	88–53	Argentina

6 August

Canada	128–84	Dominican Republic

7 August

Argentina	90–68	Dominican Republic

7 August

United States	85–66	Canada

== Classification stage ==
=== Fifth place ===
8 August

Canada	87–80	Colombia

=== Seventh place ===
8 August

Puerto Rico	107–95	Dominican Republic

== Second stage ==
Team	Pld	W	L	PF	PA	PD	Pts
Brazil	3	3	0	311	250	+61	6
United States	3	2	1	265	230	+35	5
Cuba	3	1	2	286	291	−5	4
Argentina	3	0	3	196	287	−91	3

8 August

Brazil	87–83	United States

8 August

Cuba	90–82	Argentina

9 August

Brazil	109–61	Argentina

9 August

United States	94–90	Cuba

=== Third place ===
10 August

Cuba	81–77	Argentina

=== Final ===
10 August

Brazil	101–95	United States

== Final standings ==
Qualified for the 1998 FIBA World Championship for Women

Rank	Team	Record
1st place, gold medalist(s)	Brazil	6–0
2nd place, silver medalist(s)	United States	4–2
3rd place, bronze medalist(s)	Cuba	4–2
4	Argentina	2–4
5	Canada	2–4
6	Colombia	1–3
7	Puerto Rico	1–3
8	Dominican Republic	0–4
