= 2001 FIBA Americas Championship for Women =

2001 FIBA Women's AmeriCup
6th FIBA Women's Americas Basketball Championship

Tournament details
- Host country: Brazil
- Dates: 10–15 September
- Teams: 6
- Venue: 1 (in 1 host city)

Final positions
- Champions: Brazil (2nd title)

The 2001 FIBA Americas Championship for Women, was the sixth FIBA Americas Championship for Women regional basketball championship held by FIBA Americas, which also served as Americas qualifier for the 2002 FIBA World Championship for Women, granting berths to the top three teams in the final standings. It was held in Brazil between 10 September and 15 September 2001. Six national teams entered the event under the auspices of FIBA Americas, the sport's regional governing body. The city of São Luís hosted the tournament. Brazil won their second title after defeating Cuba in the final.

== Format ==
- Teams were split into two round-robin groups of three teams each. The top two teams from each group advanced to the second stage, which consisted of another round-robin group where the results between teams from the same group in the preliminary stage were carried over. The first two teams from the second stage group qualified directly to the 2002 FIBA World Championship for Women and played an extra game for the championship. Third and fourth places were defined by the standings in the second stage group.
- The teams that did not get past the first round played an extra game to define fifth place.

== First round ==
Advanced to the semifinals

=== Group A ===
Team	Pld	W	L	PF	PA	PD	Pts
Brazil	2	2	0	202	102	+100	4
Argentina	2	1	1	132	159	−27	3
Mexico	2	0	2	139	212	−73	2

10 September
15:00

Brazil	119–63	Mexico

11 September
15:00

Argentina	93–76	Mexico
Scoring by quarter: 16–20, 28–24, 20–14, 29–18

12 September
15:00

Brazil	83–39	Argentina
Scoring by quarter: 22–12, 14–7, 19–13, 28–7

=== Group B ===
Team	Pld	W	L	PF	PA	PD	Pts
Cuba	2	2	0	170	96	+74	4
Canada	2	1	1	142	111	+31	3
Chile	2	0	2	74	179	−105	2

10 September
13:00

Chile	33–100	Cuba

11 September
13:00

Canada	79–41	Chile
Scoring by quarter: 23–4, 25–9, 21–21, 10–7

12 September
13:00

Cuba	70–63 (OT)	Canada
Scoring by quarter: 19–24, 13–15, 15–12, 11–7, Overtime: 12–5

== Fifth place ==
13 September
13:00

Chile	61–55	Mexico
Scoring by quarter: 10–9, 20–12, 9–17, 22–17

== Second round ==
Team	Pld	W	L	PF	PA	PD	Pts
Cuba	4	4	0	319	231	+88	8
Brazil	4	3	1	349	239	+110	7
Argentina	4	2	2	240	279	−39	6
Canada	4	1	3	250	231	+19	5

13 September
15:00

Cuba	70–57	Argentina
Scoring by quarter: 12–20, 17–13, 20–13, 21–11

13 September
17:00

Brazil	69–58	Canada
Scoring by quarter: 19–17, 12–18, 24–14, 14–9

14 September
15:00

Argentina	51–50	Canada
Scoring by quarter: 9–8, 13–19, 12–13, 17–10

14 September
17:00

Brazil	78–79	Cuba
Scoring by quarter: 24–15, 16–22, 19–20, 19–22

=== Final ===
15 September

Cuba	83–88	Brazil

== Final standings ==
Qualified for the 2002 FIBA World Championship for Women

Rank	Team	Record
1st place, gold medalist(s)	Brazil	4–1
2nd place, silver medalist(s)	Cuba	4–1
3rd place, bronze medalist(s)	Argentina	2–2
4	Canada	1–3
5	Chile	1–2
6	Mexico	0–3
