= 2005 FIBA Americas Championship for Women =

2005 FIBA Women's AmeriCup
8th FIBA Women's Americas Basketball Championship

Tournament details
- Host country: Dominican Republic
- Dates: 14–18 September
- Teams: 6
- Venue: 1 (in 1 host city)

Final positions
- Champions: Cuba (3rd title)

The 2005 FIBA Americas Championship for Women, was the eight FIBA Americas Championship for Women regional basketball championship held by FIBA Americas, which also served as Americas qualifier for the 2006 FIBA World Championship for Women, granting berths to the top four teams in the final standings. It was held in Dominican Republic between 14 and 18 September 2005. Eight national teams entered the event under the auspices of FIBA Americas, the sport's regional governing body. The city of São Paulo hosted the tournament. Cuba won their third title after defeating the Brazil in the final.

== Group round ==
=== Standings ===
Team	Pld	W	L	PF	PA	PD	Pts	Tie
Cuba	5	5	0	421	323	+98	10	2–0
Brazil	5	4	1	410	327	+83	9	1–1
Canada	5	3	2	374	344	+30	8	2–0
Argentina	5	2	3	401	379	+22	7	1–1
Puerto Rico	5	1	4	369	396	−27	6	0–2
Dominican Republic	5	0	5	259	465	−206	5	0–2

September 14

Cuba	61–73	Canada
Scoring by quarter: 24–18, 8–8, 16–19, 16–25

Hato Mayor

September 14

Argentina	69–86	Brazil
Scoring by quarter: 19–27, 16–20, 15–17, 19–22

Hato Mayor

September 14

Puerto Rico	94–55	Dominican Republic
Scoring by quarter: 14–26, 10–27, 13–23, 18–18

Hato Mayor

September 15

Argentina	57–77	Canada
Scoring by quarter: 13–23, 18–17, 14–17, 12–20

Hato Mayor

September 15

Puerto Rico	67–83	Brazil
Scoring by quarter: 17–18, 10–15, 18–17, 22–33

Hato Mayor

September 15

Dominican Republic	47–94	Cuba
Scoring by quarter: 10–28, 8–21, 11–30, 18–15

Hato Mayor

September 16

Cuba	84–54	Puerto Rico
Scoring by quarter: 25–19, 22–9, 21–10, 16–16

Hato Mayor

September 16

Canada	64–76	Brazil
Scoring by quarter: 14–21, 22–14, 16–22, 12–19

Hato Mayor

September 16

Argentina	96–54	Dominican Republic
Scoring by quarter: 19–13, 26–17, 22–10, 29–14

Hato Mayor

September 17

Canada	83–81	Puerto Rico
Scoring by quarter: 16–21, 18–17, 29–22, 20–21

Hato Mayor

September 17

Argentina	88–89 (OT)	Cuba
Scoring by quarter: 15–21, 23–18, 17–18, 27–25, Overtime: 6–7

Hato Mayor

September 17

Brazil	92–46	Dominican Republic
Scoring by quarter: 33–10, 20–15, 23–10, 16–11

Hato Mayor

September 18

Puerto Rico	73–91	Argentina
Scoring by quarter: 12–22, 21–17, 18–27, 22–25

Hato Mayor

September 18

Brazil	73–81	Cuba
Scoring by quarter: 20–21, 13–14, 14–29, 26–17

Hato Mayor

September 18

Dominican Republic	57–89	Canada
Scoring by quarter: 15–20, 12–28, 17–22, 13–19

Hato Mayor

2005 Champions of the Americas

Cuba
Third title
