= 2007 FIBA Americas Championship for Women =

2007 FIBA Women's AmeriCup
9th FIBA Women's Americas Basketball Championship
- Official Logo

Tournament details
- Host country: Chile
- Dates: 26 – 30 September 2007
- Teams: 8 (from 1 federation)
- Venue: 1 (in 1 host city)

Final positions
- Champions: United States (2nd title)

Tournament statistics
- MVP: (Cuba) Yaquelín Plutín
- Top scorer: (Jamaica) Simone Edwards (18.8)
- Top rebounds: (Mexico) Fernanda Gutiérrez (8)
- Top assists: (United States) Cappie Pondexter (4.8)
- PPG (Team): United States (98)
- RPG (Team): United States (38.4)
- APG (Team): United States (25.4)

Official website
- 2007 FIBA Americas Championship for Women

The 2007 FIBA Americas Championship for Women was the qualifying tournament for FIBA Americas at the women's basketball tournament at the 2008 Summer Olympics in Beijing, China. The tournament was held in Valdivia, Chile from 26 – 30 September 2007.

== Preliminary round ==
Times given below are in Atlantic Standard Time Zone (UTC-4).

=== Group A ===
Team	Pts.	W	L	PCT	PF	PA	Diff
Brazil	6	3	0	1.000	295	166	+129
Argentina	5	2	1	0.666	218	187	+31
Chile	4	1	2	0.333	208	224	−16
Mexico	3	0	3	0.000	150	219	−144

September 26
16:00

Brazil	72–62	Argentina
Scoring by quarter: 15–12, 23–16, 24–17, 10–17

Antonio Azurmendi Coliseum, Valdivia

September 26
21:30

Chile	85–54	Mexico
Scoring by quarter: 21–16, 22–8, 24–19, 18–11

Antonio Azurmendi Coliseum, Valdivia

September 27
16:00

Chile	60–104	Brazil
Scoring by quarter: 11–34, 12–19, 22–24, 15–27

Antonio Azurmendi Coliseum, Valdivia

September 27
21:30

Mexico	52–90	Argentina
Scoring by quarter: 5–26, 11–15, 22–23, 14–26

Antonio Azurmendi Coliseum, Valdivia

September 28
19:00

Brazil	119–44	Mexico
Scoring by quarter: 31–9, 32–1, 26–16, 30–18

Antonio Azurmendi Coliseum, Valdivia

September 28
21:30

Argentina	66–63 (OT)	Chile
Scoring by quarter: 16–15, 13–4, 15–21, 12–16, Overtime: 15–8

Antonio Azurmendi Coliseum, Valdivia

Qualified for Medal round
Relegated to Classification round

=== Group B ===
Team	Pts.	W	L	PCT	PF	PA	Diff
United States	6	3	0	1.000	285	163	+122
Cuba	5	2	1	0.666	230	199	+31
Canada	4	1	2	0.333	157	207	−50
Jamaica	3	0	3	0.000	156	259	−103

September 26
13:30

Canada	68–47	Jamaica
Scoring by quarter: 18–3, 19–21, 16–10, 15–13

Antonio Azurmendi Coliseum, Valdivia

September 26
19:00

United States	85–79	Cuba
Scoring by quarter: 17–17, 16–17, 22–24, 30–21

Antonio Azurmendi Coliseum, Valdivia

September 27
13:30

Jamaica	47–115	United States
Scoring by quarter: 11–22, 17–26, 13–35, 6–32

Antonio Azurmendi Coliseum, Valdivia

September 27
19:00

Cuba	75–52	Canada
Scoring by quarter: 23–7, 16–7, 15–23, 21–15

Antonio Azurmendi Coliseum, Valdivia

September 28
13:30

Cuba	76–62	Jamaica
Scoring by quarter: 24–11, 14–19, 16–16, 22–16

Antonio Azurmendi Coliseum, Valdivia

September 28
16:00

United States	85–37	Canada
Scoring by quarter: 17–13, 21–6, 24–9, 23–9

Antonio Azurmendi Coliseum, Valdivia

== Knockout stage ==
=== Championship Bracket ===
Semi-finals
September 29
United States	104
Argentina	53
September 29
Brazil	67
Cuba	69

Final
September 30
United States	101
Cuba	71
Third place
September 30
Brazil	73
Argentina	41

=== 5th place bracket ===
Semi-finals
September 29
Canada	77
Mexico	38
September 29
Chile	75
Jamaica	67

Fifth place
September 30
Canada	86
Chile	68
Seventh place
September 30
Mexico	62
Jamaica	55

=== Classification rounds ===
September 29
11:30

Classif. 5–8

Canada	77–38	Mexico
Scoring by quarter: 17–9, 21–11, 24–8, 15–10

Antonio Azurmendi Coliseum, Valdivia

September 29
14:00

Classif. 5–8

Chile	75–67	Jamaica
Scoring by quarter: 25–20, 15–12, 16–14, 19–21

Antonio Azurmendi Coliseum, Valdivia

September 30
08:30

7th place

Jamaica	55–62	Mexico
Scoring by quarter: 28–24, 0–0, 16–14, 11–24

Antonio Azurmendi Coliseum, Valdivia

September 30
11:00

5th place

Canada	86–68	Chile
Scoring by quarter: 22–10, 20–19, 19–17, 25–22

Antonio Azurmendi Coliseum, Valdivia

=== Semifinals ===
September 29
16:30

United States	104–53	Argentina
Scoring by quarter: 28–9, 28–6, 22–16, 26–22

Antonio Azurmendi Coliseum, Valdivia

September 29
20:00

Brazil	67–69	Cuba
Scoring by quarter: 17–14, 14–10, 15–31, 21–14

Antonio Azurmendi Coliseum, Valdivia

=== Third place game ===
September 30
13:30

Brazil	73–41	Argentina
Scoring by quarter: 13–15, 15–6, 26–13, 19–7

Antonio Azurmendi Coliseum, Valdivia

=== Final ===
September 30
16:00

United States	101–71	Cuba
Scoring by quarter: 29–13, 20–17, 29–14, 23–27

Antonio Azurmendi Coliseum, Valdivia

2007 Champions of the Americas

United States
Second title

== Final standings ==
Rank	Team	Record
1	United States	5–0
2	Cuba	3–2
3	Brazil	4–1
4	Argentina	2–3
5	Canada	3–2
6	Chile	2–3
7	Mexico	1–4
8	Jamaica	0–5

== Olympic Qualification ==
As winner of the tournament the United States gets direct entry into the 2008 Beijing Olympics.

The runner up Cuba and the two teams that competed in the bronze medal game, Brazil and Argentina will get another chance through the FIBA Wildcard Tournament.
