= 1999 FIBA Americas Championship for Women =

1999 FIBA Women's AmeriCup
5th FIBA Women's Americas Basketball Championship

Tournament details
- Host country: Cuba
- Dates: 12–17 May
- Teams: 8
- Venue: 1 (in 1 host city)

Final positions
- Champions: Cuba (2nd title)

The 1999 FIBA Americas Championship for Women, was the fifth FIBA Americas Championship for Women regional basketball championship held by FIBA Americas, which also served as Americas qualifier for the 2000 Summer Olympics, granting berths to the top three teams in the final standings. It was held in Cuba between 12 May and 17 August 1999. Eight national teams entered the event under the auspices of FIBA Americas, the sport's regional governing body. The city of Havana hosted the tournament. Cuba won their second title after defeating Brazil in the final.

== Format ==
- Teams were split into two round-robin groups of four teams each. The top two teams from each group advanced to the knockout semifinals. The winners from the semifinals competed for the championship and qualified directly to the 2000 Summer Olympics. The losing teams from the semifinals played a game for third place and the final berth to the Olympic Tournament.
- The teams that did not get past the first round competed in a separate bracket to define places fifth through eighth in the final standings.

== First round ==
Advanced to the semifinals

=== Group A ===
Team	Pld	W	L	PF	PA	PD	Pts
Cuba	3	3	0	283	148	+135	6
Mexico	3	2	1	187	205	−18	5
Argentina	3	1	2	172	197	−25	4
Dominican Republic	3	0	3	173	265	−92	3

12 May

Cuba	76–42	Mexico

12 May

Argentina	56–54	Dominican Republic

13 May

Cuba	126–51	Dominican Republic

13 May

Mexico	62–61	Argentina

14 May

Cuba	81–55	Argentina

14 May

Mexico	83–68	Dominican Republic

=== Group B ===
Team	Pld	W	L	PF	PA	PD	Pts
Brazil	3	3	0	257	170	+87	6
Canada	3	2	1	227	161	+66	5
Puerto Rico	3	1	2	179	221	−42	4
Venezuela	3	0	3	147	258	−111	3

12 May

Brazil	102–56	Puerto Rico

12 May

Canada	101–40	Venezuela

13 May

Brazil	83–48	Venezuela

13 May

Canada	60–49	Puerto Rico

14 May

Brazil	72–66	Canada

14 May

Puerto Rico	74–59	Venezuela

== Classification stage ==
Classification round
16 May
Argentina	59
Venezuela	49
16 May
Dominican Republic	75
Puerto Rico	71

Fifth place
17 May
Argentina	2
Dominican Republic	0
Seventh place
17 May
Venezuela	61
Puerto Rico	75

== Championship bracket ==
Championship round
16 May
Cuba	80
Canada	60
16 May
Mexico	43
Brazil	76

Final
17 May
Cuba	90
Brazil	87
Third Place
17 May
Canada	80
Mexico	37

=== Seventh Place ===
17 May

Puerto Rico	75–61	Venezuela

=== Fifth Place ===
17 May

Dominican Republic	0–2	Argentina

=== Third place game ===
17 May

Canada	80–37	Mexico

=== Final ===
17 May

Brazil	87–90	Cuba

2003 Champions of the Americas

Cuba
First title

== Final standings ==
Qualified for the 2000 Summer Olympics

Rank	Team	Record
1st place, gold medalist(s)	Cuba	5–0
2nd place, silver medalist(s)	Brazil	4–1
3rd place, bronze medalist(s)	Canada	3–2
4	Mexico	2–3
5	Argentina	2–2
6	Dominican Republic	1–3
7	Puerto Rico	2–3
8	Venezuela	0–5
