= 1989 FIBA Americas Championship for Women =

1989 FIBA Women's AmeriCup
1st FIBA Women's Americas Basketball Championship

Tournament details
- Host country: Brazil
- Dates: 6–13 August
- Teams: 8
- Venue: 1 (in 1 host city)

Final positions
- Champions: Cuba (1st title)

The 1989 FIBA Americas Championship for Women, was the first FIBA Americas Championship for Women regional basketball championship held by FIBA Americas, which also served as Americas qualifier for the 1990 FIBA World Championship for Women, granting berths to the top four teams in the final standings. It was held in Brazil between 6 August and 13 August 1989. Eight national teams entered the event under the auspices of FIBA Americas, the sport's regional governing body. The city of São Paulo hosted the tournament. Cuba won their first title after defeating hosts Brazil in the final.

== Format ==
- Teams were split into two round-robin groups of four teams each. The top two teams from each group advanced to the second stage and qualified directly to the 1990 FIBA World Championship for Women. The second stage consisted of another round robin group of four teams, where the top two teams played an extra game for the championship, and the other two teams played for third place.
- The teams that did not advance to the second round played in a knockout bracket to define places fifth through eighth in the final standings.

== First round ==
Advanced to the second round

=== Group A ===
Team	Pld	W	L	PF	PA	PD	Pts
Cuba	3	3	0	280	206	+74	6
United States	3	2	1	277	204	+73	5
Argentina	3	1	2	259	300	−41	4
Dominican Republic	3	0	3	190	296	−106	3

6 August
15:00

Cuba	96–39	Dominican Republic
Scoring by half: 49–22, 47–17

6 August
21:00

United States	101–68	Argentina

7 August
18:00

United States	99–58	Dominican Republic
Scoring by half: 52–32, 47–36

7 August
22:00

Cuba	106–90	Argentina

8 August
18:00

Argentina	101–93	Dominican Republic

8 August
22:00

Cuba	78–77	United States

=== Group B ===
Team	Pld	W	L	PF	PA	PD	Pts
Brazil	3	3	0	285	187	+98	6
Canada	3	2	1	213	181	+32	5
Peru	3	1	2	153	244	−91	4
Mexico	3	0	3	196	235	−39	3

6 August
17:00

Canada	73–37	Peru
Scoring by half: 33–24, 40–13

6 August
19:00

Brazil	93–73	Mexico
Scoring by half: 52–39, 41–34

7 August
16:00

Canada	82–64	Mexico
Scoring by half: 44–30, 38–34

7 August
20:00

Brazil	112–55	Peru
Scoring by half: 48–33, 64–22

8 August
16:00

Peru	60–59 (OT)	Mexico
Scoring by half: 29–22, 27–34 Overtime: 4–3

8 August
20:00

Brazil	80–58	Canada
Scoring by half: 47–28, 33–30

== Classification stage ==
Classification round
10 August – 16:00
Argentina	78
Mexico	72
10 August – 18:00
Dominican Republic	76
Peru	67

Fifth place
11 August – 18:00
Argentina	99
Dominican Republic	86
Seventh place
11 August – 16:00
Mexico	71
Peru	59

== Second stage ==
Team	Pld	W	L	PF	PA	PD	Pts
Brazil	3	3	0	310	251	+59	6
Cuba	3	2	1	248	255	−7	5
United States	3	1	2	250	236	+14	4
Canada	3	0	3	214	280	−66	3

10 August
20:00

Brazil	99–72	Canada
Scoring by half: 48–35, 51–37

10 August
22:00

Cuba	71–67	United States

11 August
20:00

Brazil	116–89	Cuba
Scoring by half: 61–65, 55–24

11 August
22:00

United States	93–70	Canada

12 August
16:00

Cuba	80–72	Canada

12 August
18:00

Brazil	95–90	United States
Scoring by half: 28–26, 77–74

=== Third place ===
13 August
13:30

Canada	71–63	United States
Scoring by half: 28–26, 43–37

=== Final ===
13 August
15:30

Cuba	87–84	Brazil
Scoring by half: 52–47, 35–37

1989 Champions of the Americas

Cuba
First title

== Final standings ==
The United States already qualified for the World Championship by virtue of winning the 1988 Olympics.

Qualified for the 1990 FIBA World Championship for Women
Qualified for the 1992 Pre-Olympic Basketball Tournament for Women

Rank	Team	Record
1st place, gold medalist(s)	Cuba	6–1
2nd place, silver medalist(s)	Brazil	6–1
3rd place, bronze medalist(s)	Canada	3–4
4	United States	3–4
5	Argentina	3–2
6	Dominican Republic	1–4
7	Mexico	1–4
8	Peru	1–4
