= 2030 FIBA Women's Basketball World Cup =

International basketball competition

2030年FIBA女子バスケットボール・ワールドカップ

Tournament details
- Host country: Japan
- Dates: 26 November – 8 December
- Teams: 16 (from 4 confederations)
- Venues: 2 (in 1 host city)

The 2030 FIBA Women's Basketball World Cup will be the 21st FIBA Women's Basketball World Cup, the quadrennial international basketball championship contested by the women's national teams of FIBA. The tournament will be hosted in Tokyo, Japan from 26 November to 8 December 2030.

This will be the first World Cup to be held in the new timeframe of November and December after FIBA changed the competition dates in May 2025.

It will be the first FIBA Women's Basketball World Cup to be held in the country and the first since the 2002 tournament in China to be held in Asia.

== Host selection ==
The bidding process started in July 2025.

- Japan – On 21 January 2025, at a press conference, FIBA finance director, Ingo Weiss, stated that Japan was interested in hosting the event and that FIBA was considering their application, with Tokyo as the host city. Japan Basketball Association, Yuko Miya, continued by saying that they made their interest public to FIBA early on, referencing how when they won the 2023 FIBA Basketball World Cup hosting rights, they declared their interest in 2017, six years in advance. If successful, this would be Japan's first time hosting the event. Japan has previous experience hosting FIBA competitions, recently organising the 2023 FIBA Basketball World Cup and 2022 FIBA Women's Basketball World Cup Qualifying Tournament group in Osaka.

During its Central Board meeting on 22 April 2026 in Berlin, Germany, FIBA announced that Japan will host the 2030 edition of the Women's World Cup. It will be the first FIBA Women's Basketball World Cup to be held in the country and the first since the 2002 tournament in China to be held in Asia. The Women's World Cup will also coincide with the 100-year anniversary of the Japan Basketball Association.

=== Quotes ===
"I am very happy and responsible to be invited to Japan for the Women's World Cup in 2030, which marks the 100th anniversary of JBA. Our goal is to create excitement in packed arenas with fans around the world and pass the baton to future generations by evolving women's basketball to a new stage. We will continue to take on the challenge of further enlivening the Japanese basketball world by considering the decision to host the tournament in Japan as a new starting point rather than a goal."

— Shinji Shimada, president of the Japan Basketball Association.

== Qualification ==
=== Qualified teams ===
As hosts, Japan automatically qualified for the tournament.

Team	Qualification method	Date of qualification	Appearance(s)				Previous best performance (Note: Bold text indicates they hosted that edition.)	WR (Note: World ranking at start of tournament.)
Team	Qualification method	Date of qualification	Total	First	Last	Streak	Previous best performance	WR
Japan	Host nation	22 April 2026	11th	1964	2026	6	Runners-up (1975)	TBD

== Venues ==
Two venues in the capital Tokyo will be used for the tournament.

== See also ==
- 2031 FIBA Basketball World Cup
