= Basketball at the 2028 Summer Olympics =

Basketball at the Games of the XXXIV Olympiad
- Venue: Intuit Dome; Inglewood, California; Valley Complex 3 (3x3); Los Angeles, California
- Dates: July 15–30, 2028
- No. of events: 4 (2 men, 2 women)

The basketball competitions are set to be contested at the 2028 Summer Olympics in Los Angeles, California in the United States. 5x5 basketball will be held at the Intuit Dome, while the 3x3 basketball will be at a temporary outdoor venue in the Sepulveda Basin Recreation Area. There will be a total of 48 teams, following the expansion of both men's and women's 3x3 tournaments from eight teams in the 2020 and 2024 Summer Olympics to 12 in 2028.

== Competition schedule ==
A full day-by-day official schedule was released in November 2025.

Legend
G	Group stage	¼	Quarter-finals	½	Semi-finals	B	Bronze medal match	F	Gold medal match

Date Event	Wed 12	Thu 13	Fri 14	Sat 15	Sun 16	Mon 17	Tue 18	Wed 19	Thu 20	Fri 21		Sat 22			Sun 23	Mon 24	Tue 25	Wed 25	Thu 27	Fri 28	Sat 29	Sun 30
Men		G		G	G	G	G	G	G	G						¼	¼		½		B	F
Women	G	G		G	G	G	G	G	G			¼			¼			½		B	F	
3x3 Men					G	G	G	G	G	G	¼	½	B	F								
3x3 Women					G	G	G	G	G	G	¼	½	B	F								
