= Argentina women's national basketball team =

Argentina
- FIBA ranking: 23 ▲4 (18 March 2026)
- FIBA zone: FIBA Americas
- National federation: CAB
- Coach: Gregorio Martínez
- Nickname: Las Gigantes

World Cup
- Appearances: 9

FIBA AmeriCup
- Appearances: 18
- Medals: Silver: (2009, 2011, 2017); Bronze: (2001, 2015)

Pan American Games
- Appearances: 8
- Medals: Bronze: (2023)
Home	Away

The Argentina women's national basketball team, nicknamed Las Gigantes (Spanish for 'The Giantesses'), is administered by the Argentine Basketball Federation.

== Competition results ==
=== FIBA World Championship ===
Year	Position	Pld	W	L
(Chile) 1953	6th	6	2	4
(Brazil) 1957	9th	7	4	3
(Soviet Union) 1959	did not participate			
(Peru) 1964	13th	8	1	7
(Czechoslovakia) 1967	did not participate			
(Brazil) 1971	11th	8	2	6
1975 to 1994	did not participate			
(Germany) 1998	15th	5	1	4
(China) 2002	10th	8	2	6
(Brazil) 2006	9th	8	5	3
(Czechoslovakia) 2010	14th	5	1	4
(Turkey) 2014	did not participate			
(Spain) 2018	15th	3	0	3
(Australia) 2022	did not participate			
(Germany) 2026	did not qualify			
(Japan) 2030	To be determined			
Total		58	18	40

=== Pan American Games ===
Year	Position	Pld	W	L
1955 to 1987	did not participate			
(Cuba) 1991	5th	4	0	4
(Argentina) 1995	Competition cancelled			
(Canada) 1999	5th	6	2	4
(Dominican Republic) 2003	5th	5	1	4
(Brazil) 2007	6th	5	1	4
(Mexico) 2011	5th	4	2	2
(Canada) 2015	5th	4	2	2
(Peru) 2019	5th	4	2	2
(Chile) 2023	Bronze Medal	5	3	2
(Peru) 2027	To be determined			
(Paraguay) 2031	To be determined			
Total		37	13	24

=== FIBA Americas Championship ===
Year	Position	Pld	W	L
(Brazil) 1989	5th	5	3	2
(Brazil) 1993	7th	4	1	3
(Canada) 1995	4th	5	1	4
(Brazil) 1997	4th	6	2	4
(Cuba) 1999	5th	4	2	2
(Brazil) 2001	Bronze Medal	4	2	2
(Mexico) 2003	5th	4	2	2
(Dominican Republic) 2005	4th	5	2	3
(Chile) 2007	4th	5	2	3
(Brazil) 2009	Runner-up	5	4	1
(Colombia) 2011	Runner-up	6	5	1
(Mexico) 2013	5th	4	2	2
(Canada) 2015	Bronze Medal	6	5	1
(Argentina) 2017	Runner-up	6	5	1
(Puerto Rico) 2019	8th	4	1	3
(Puerto Rico) 2021	Disqualified (Note: Argentina was disqualified after several members of the delegation were tested positive to COVID-19.)			
(Mexico) 2023	7th	5	1	4
(Chile) 2025	4th	7	3	4
(El Salvador) 2027	Qualified			
(Nicaragua) 2029	To Be Determined			
Total		85	43	42

=== South American Championship ===
Year	Position	Pld	W	L
(Chile) 1946	Bronze Medal	3	1	2
(Argentina) 1948	Champions	4	4	0
(Peru) 1950	Runner-up	6	4	2
(Paraguay) 1952	4th	5	2	3
(Brazil) 1954	did not participate			
(Ecuador) 1956	4th	6	4	2
(Peru) 1958	Runner-up	8	4	4
(Chile) 1960	5th	8	2	6
(Paraguay) 1962	4th	6	3	3
(Brazil) 1965	4th	5	2	3
(Colombia) 1967	5th	6	2	4
(Chile) 1968	Bronze Medal	5	3	2
(Ecuador) 1970	Runner-up	7	5	2
(Peru) 1972	4th	7	4	3
(Bolivia) 1974	Runner-up	6	4	2
(Peru) 1977	Bronze Medal	7	4	3
(Bolivia) 1978	Bronze Medal	4	2	2
(Peru) 1981	4th	-	-	-
(Colombia) 1984	4th	7	4	3
(Brazil) 1986	4th	3	0	3
(Chile) 1989	Bronze Medal	5	3	2
(Colombia) 1991	Bronze Medal	6	4	2
(Bolivia) 1993	Runner-up	-	-	-
(Brazil) 1995	Runner-up	5	3	2
(Chile) 1997	Runner-up	7	6	1
(Brazil) 1999	Runner-up	5	4	1
(Peru) 2001	Runner-up	7	5	2
(Ecuador) 2003	Runner-up	6	4	2
(Colombia) 2005	Bronze Medal	6	4	2
(Paraguay) 2006	Runner-up	5	4	1
(Ecuador) 2008	Runner-up	6	4	2
(Ecuador) 2010	Runner-up	4	3	1
(Argentina) 2013	Runner-up	5	4	1
(Ecuador) 2014	Runner-up	5	4	1
(Venezuela) 2016	4th	5	2	3
(Colombia) 2018	Champions	5	5	0
(Argentina) 2022	Runner-up	5	4	1
(Chile) 2024	Champions	6	6	0
(Argentina) 2026	Champions	5	5	0
Total		201	128	73

== Current roster ==
Roster for the 2025 FIBA Women's AmeriCup.

Argentina women's national basketball team roster
Players
Coaches

Pos.	No.	Name	Age – Date of birth	Height	Club	Ctr.
C	3	Julieta Mungo	27 – 6 August 1997	1.81 m (5 ft 11 in)	Oses Ardoi	(Spain)
PG	4	Amaiquen Siciliano	25 – 5 September 1999	1.65 m (5 ft 5 in)	Virtus Eirene Ragusa	(Italy)
SG	5	Flor Martínez	30 – 5 September 1994	1.70 m (5 ft 7 in)	Union Florida	(Argentina)
C	7	Diana Cabrera	31 – 7 August 1993	1.88 m (6 ft 2 in)	Don Bosco	(Spain)
SF	8	Andrea Boquete	34 – 24 September 1990	1.80 m (5 ft 11 in)	Don Bosco	(Spain)
C	10	Agostina Burani	33 – 4 October 1991	1.86 m (6 ft 1 in)	Obras Sanitarias	(Argentina)
PG	11	Melisa Gretter (C)	32 – 24 January 1993	1.67 m (5 ft 6 in)	CAB Estepona	(Spain)
SF	13	Candela Gentinetta	24 – 18 March 2001	1.81 m (5 ft 11 in)	Obras Sanitarias	(Argentina)
SG	14	Florencia Chagas	24 – 27 June 2001	1.80 m (5 ft 11 in)	Obras Sanitarias	(Argentina)
SG	19	Delfina Sarvia	22 – 19 May 2003	1.74 m (5 ft 9 in)	Union Florida	(Argentina)
PG	20	Macarena D'Urso	33 – 16 December 1991	1.62 m (5 ft 4 in)	CB Melilla	(Spain)
PF	23	Victoria Gauna	23 – 22 July 2001	1.85 m (6 ft 1 in)	Free agent

Head coach

- (Argentina) Gregorio Martínez

Assistant coach(es)

- (Argentina) Javier Ielmini

Legend

- (C) Team captain
- Club – describes last
  club before the tournament
- Age – describes age
  on 28 June 2025
