= 2018 South American Basketball Championship for Women =

36th South American Women's Basketball Championship

Tournament details
- Host country: Colombia
- City: Tunja
- Dates: 30 August – 4 September
- Teams: 8 (from 1 confederation)
- Venue: 1 (in 1 host city)

Final positions
- Champions: Argentina (2nd title)
- Runners-up: Brazil
- Third place: Colombia

Tournament statistics
- MVP: (Argentina) Melisa Gretter

Official website
- www.fiba.basketball

The 2018 South American Basketball Championship for Women was the 36th edition of the tournament. Eight teams participated in the competition, held in Tunja, Colombia, from 30 August to 4 September 2018.

== Group phase ==
In this round, the teams were drawn into two groups. The first two teams from each group advanced to the semifinals; the other teams advanced to the 5th–8th place playoffs.

All times are local (Colombia Time – UTC-5).

=== Group A ===
Pos	Team	Pld	W	L	PF	PA	PD	Pts	Qualification
1	Brazil	3	3	0	276	183	+93	6	Semifinals
2	Paraguay	3	2	1	229	239	−10	5	Semifinals
3	Venezuela	3	1	2	192	218	−26	4	5th–8th place playoffs
4	Chile	3	0	3	192	249	−57	3	5th–8th place playoffs

Source: FIBA

30 August 2018
13:15

Report

Paraguay	73–66	Chile
Scoring by quarter: 17–21, 15–19, 23–8, 18–18
Pts: Ferrari 33; Rebs: Rojas 8 Asts: Mercado, Ferrari 3		Pts: Morrison 25; Rebs: Morrison 14; Asts: Cousiño 6

Coliseo Cubierto San Antonio, Tunja
Referees: Julio Anaya (PAN), Yuliet Méndez (CUB), Carlos Peralta (ECU)

30 August 2018
17:45

Report

Venezuela	42–77	Brazil
Scoring by quarter: 12–20, 13–14, 8–18, 9–25
Pts: Márquez 11; Rebs: Wallen 4 Asts: Pérez 3		Pts: Dos Santos 15; Rebs: De Souza 10; Asts: Honório 5

Coliseo Cubierto San Antonio, Tunja
Referees: Andrés Bartel (URU), Virginia Peruchini (ARG), Carlos Vélez (COL)

31 August 2018
13:15

Report

Brazil	100–75	Paraguay
Scoring by quarter: 23–18, 21–21, 31–16, 25–20
Pts: De Paula 27; Rebs: Dos Santos 15; Asts: Honório 6		Pts: Insfrán 17; Rebs: four players 3 Asts: Ferrari 3

Coliseo Cubierto San Antonio, Tunja
Referees: Andrés Bartel (URU), Yuliet Méndez (CUB), Julio Anaya (PAN)

31 August 2018
17:45

Report

Chile	60–77	Venezuela
Scoring by quarter: 20–20, 12–16, 12–20, 16–21
Pts: Gómez 18; Rebs: Morrison 10; Asts: Novión 9		Pts: Wallen 27; Rebs: Márquez 8 Asts: Márquez, Pérez 7

Coliseo Cubierto San Antonio, Tunja
Referees: Carlos Peralta (ECU), Virginia Peruchini (ARG), Carlos Vélez (COL)

1 September 2018
12:15

Report

Paraguay	81–73	Venezuela
Scoring by quarter: 22–9, 20–21, 17–19, 22–24
Pts: Ferrari 29; Rebs: Caraves 9 Asts: Mercado 6		Pts: Márquez 21; Rebs: Corrales 10; Asts: Márquez 7

Coliseo Cubierto San Antonio, Tunja
Referees: Andrés Bartel (URU), Virginia Peruchini (ARG), Carlos Peralta (ECU)

1 September 2018
16:45

Report

Brazil	99–66	Chile
Scoring by quarter: 28–20, 22–15, 25–16, 24–15
Pts: De Paula 20; Rebs: Sangalli 9 Asts: Honório 7		Pts: Gómez 16; Rebs: Gómez 9 Asts: Cousiño 4

Coliseo Cubierto San Antonio, Tunja
Referees: Yuliet Méndez (CUB), Carlos Vélez (COL), Leydys Castellón (CUB)

=== Group B ===
Pos	Team	Pld	W	L	PF	PA	PD	Pts	Qualification
1	Argentina	3	3	0	219	135	+84	6	Semifinals
2	Colombia	3	2	1	220	134	+86	5	Semifinals
3	Ecuador	3	1	2	138	200	−62	4	5th–8th place playoffs
4	Peru	3	0	3	112	220	−108	3	5th–8th place playoffs

Source: FIBA

30 August 2018
15:30

Report

Argentina	74–41	Ecuador
Scoring by quarter: 25–10, 16–12, 20–10, 13–9
Pts: Boquete 12; Rebs: Leiva 9 Asts: Gretter 5		Pts: Mogollón 7 Rebs: Caicedo 7 Asts: Caicedo, Lasso 3

Coliseo Cubierto San Antonio, Tunja
Referees: Marcos Benito (BRA), Nicolás Flores (PAR), Leydys Castellón (CUB)

30 August 2018
20:00

Report

Peru	28–84	Colombia
Scoring by quarter: 1–26, 7–15, 8–17, 12–26
Pts: Escudero 7 Rebs: Vega 10; Asts: six players 1		Pts: Caicedo 17; Rebs: Córdoba 10; Asts: Ríos 6

Coliseo Cubierto San Antonio, Tunja
Referees: Daniel García (VEN), Alejandra Gaytán (MEX), Felipe Valenzuela (CHI)

31 August 2018
15:30

Report

Argentina	78–33	Peru
Scoring by quarter: 18–15, 19–11, 22–1, 19–6
Pts: Boquete 14; Rebs: Boquete 10; Asts: Durso 4		Pts: Farfán 15; Rebs: Vega 8 Asts: Parodi, Guerrero 2

Coliseo Cubierto San Antonio, Tunja
Referees: Daniel García (VEN), Alejandra Gaytán (MEX), Leydys Castellón (CUB)

31 August 2018
20:00

Report

Ecuador	39–75	Colombia
Scoring by quarter: 7–25, 8–15, 21–15, 3–20
Pts: Caicedo 11; Rebs: Barahona, Mogollón 8 Asts: Barahona 2		Pts: Caicedo 19; Rebs: Córdoba 10; Asts: Ríos, Muñoz 4

Coliseo Cubierto San Antonio, Tunja
Referees: Marcos Benito (BRA), Nicolás Flores (PAR), Felipe Valenzuela (CHI)

1 September 2018
14:30

Report

Ecuador	58–51	Peru
Scoring by quarter: 13–14, 18–5, 7–19, 20–13
Pts: Salcedo 15; Rebs: Barahona 10; Asts: three players 2		Pts: Farfán 27; Rebs: Vega 12; Asts: Vega 2

Coliseo Cubierto San Antonio, Tunja
Referees: Alejandra Gaytán (MEX), Nicolás Flores (PAR), Felipe Valenzuela (CHI)

1 September 2018
19:00

Report

Colombia	61–67	Argentina
Scoring by quarter: 18–16, 12–7, 16–17, 15–27
Pts: Martínez 14; Rebs: Prens 7 Asts: Ríos, Muñoz 3		Pts: Burani 17; Rebs: Gretter 11; Asts: Gretter 8

Coliseo Cubierto San Antonio, Tunja
Referees: Marcos Benito (BRA), Julio Anaya (PAN), Daniel García (VEN)

== 5th–8th place playoffs ==
5th–8th place semifinals
3 September 2018
Venezuela	76
Peru	62
3 September 2018
Chile	61
Ecuador	68

5th place match
4 September 2018
Venezuela	85
Ecuador	60
7th place match
4 September 2018
Peru	70
Chile	80

=== 5th–8th place semifinals ===
3 September 2018
13:15

Report

Venezuela	76–62	Peru
Scoring by quarter: 22–8, 21–21, 16–9, 17–24
Pts: Wallen 13; Rebs: Garate 10; Asts: Pérez 10		Pts: Guerrero 18; Rebs: Vega 12; Asts: Vega 3

Coliseo Cubierto San Antonio, Tunja
Referees: Carlos Vélez (COL), Nicolás Flores (PAR), Leydys Castellón (CUB)

3 September 2018
15:30

Report

Chile	61–68	Ecuador
Scoring by quarter: 18–24, 16–7, 8–17, 19–20
Pts: Morrison 23; Rebs: Gómez 12; Asts: Cousiño 5		Pts: Caicedo 22; Rebs: Caicedo 7 Asts: Lasso 6

Coliseo Cubierto San Antonio, Tunja
Referees: Marcos Benito (BRA), Yuliet Méndez (CUB), Alejandra Gaytán (MEX)

=== 7th place match ===
4 September 2018
13:15

Report

Peru	70–80	Chile
Scoring by quarter: 18–18, 14–23, 17–18, 21–21
Pts: Farfán 19; Rebs: Vega 7 Asts: Farfán 4		Pts: Gómez 20; Rebs: Gómez 8 Asts: Troncoso 5

Coliseo Cubierto San Antonio, Tunja

=== 5th place match ===
4 September 2018
15:30

Report

Venezuela	85–60	Ecuador
Scoring by quarter: 28–18, 22–15, 20–14, 15–13
Pts: Wallen 23; Rebs: Wallen 12; Asts: Wallen 7		Pts: Yépez 14; Rebs: Yépez 6 Asts: Barahona 2

Coliseo Cubierto San Antonio, Tunja

== Championship playoffs ==
Semifinals
3 September 2018
Brazil	67
Colombia	58
3 September 2018
Argentina	80
Paraguay	67

Final
4 September 2018
Brazil	64
Argentina	65
3rd place match
4 September 2018
Colombia	83
Paraguay	78

=== Semifinals ===
3 September 2018
17:45

Report

Argentina	80–67	Paraguay
Scoring by quarter: 14–20, 17–16, 31–11, 18–20
Pts: González 23; Rebs: Burani 9 Asts: Burani, González 3		Pts: Peralta 17; Rebs: Peralta, Caraves 9 Asts: Mercado 6

Coliseo Cubierto San Antonio, Tunja
Referees: Daniel García (VEN), Julio Anaya (PAN), Felipe Valenzuela (CHI)

3 September 2018
20:00

Report

Brazil	67–58	Colombia
Scoring by quarter: 23–19, 12–20, 20–2, 12–17
Pts: Dos Santos 21; Rebs: Dos Santos 13; Asts: Honório 8		Pts: Mosquera 18; Rebs: Muñoz 8 Asts: Martínez 7

Coliseo Cubierto San Antonio, Tunja
Referees: Andrés Bartel (URU), Virginia Peruchini (ARG), Carlos Peralta (ECU)

=== 3rd place match ===
4 September 2018
17:45

Report

Colombia	83–78	Paraguay
Scoring by quarter: 26–20, 20–22, 18–7, 19–29
Pts: Mosquera 25; Rebs: Arias 10; Asts: Arias 6		Pts: Ferrari 34; Rebs: Peralta 11; Asts: Ferrari 5

Coliseo Cubierto San Antonio, Tunja

=== Final ===
4 September 2018
20:00

Report

Brazil	64–65	Argentina
Scoring by quarter: 17–8, 15–12, 16–22, 16–23
Pts: Dos Santos 19; Rebs: Dos Santos 15; Asts: Honório, Dos Santos 4		Pts: Rosset, Boquete 13; Rebs: Llorente 6 Asts: Gretter 4

Coliseo Cubierto San Antonio, Tunja

== Final standings ==
Rank	Team	Record
1st place, gold medalist(s)	Argentina	5–0
2nd place, silver medalist(s)	Brazil	4–1
3rd place, bronze medalist(s)	Colombia	3–2
4	Paraguay	2–3
5	Venezuela	3–2
6	Ecuador	2–3
7	Chile	1–4
8	Peru	0–5

Qualified for the 2019 FIBA Women's AmeriCup
