= 2016 South American Basketball Championship for Women =

35th South American Women's Basketball Championship

Tournament details
- Host country: Venezuela
- City: Barquisimeto
- Dates: 20–26 May 2016
- Teams: 9 (from 1 confederation)
- Venue: 1 (in 1 host city)

Final positions
- Champions: Brazil (26th title)
- Runners-up: Venezuela
- Third place: Colombia

Tournament statistics
- MVP: (Brazil) Izi Castro Marques

Official website
- www.fiba.basketball

The 2016 South American Basketball Championship for Women was the 35th edition of the tournament. Nine teams participated in the competition, held in Barquisimeto, Venezuela, from 20 to 26 May 2016.

== Group phase ==
In this round, the teams were drawn into two groups. The first two teams from each group advanced to the semifinals; the third teams advanced to the 5th place match.

All times are local (Venezuelan Standard Time – UTC-4).

=== Group A ===
| Pos | Team | Pld | W | L | PF | PA | PD | Pts | Qualification |
|---|---|---|---|---|---|---|---|---|---|
| 1 | Brazil | 4 | 4 | 0 | 423 | 186 | +237 | 8 | Semifinals |
| 2 | Colombia | 4 | 3 | 1 | 309 | 214 | +95 | 7 | Semifinals |
| 3 | Paraguay | 4 | 2 | 2 | 238 | 345 | −107 | 6 | 5th place match |
| 4 | Chile | 4 | 1 | 3 | 229 | 319 | −90 | 5 | |
| 5 | Uruguay | 4 | 0 | 4 | 193 | 328 | −135 | 4 | |

Source: FIBA

20 May 2016
14:30

Report

| Chile | 38–79 | Colombia |
Scoring by quarter: 4–18, 10–23, 11–16, 13–22
| Pts: Gómez 10; Rebs: five players 4 Asts: three players 1 | | Pts: Martínez 16; Rebs: three players 8 Asts: Rios 6 |

Domo Bolivariano, Barquisimeto

20 May 2016
16:45

Report

| Uruguay | 42–115 | Brazil |
Scoring by quarter: 4–30, 16–27, 9–22, 13–36
| Pts: Sergio 7 Rebs: Sergio 5 Asts: five players 1 | | Pts: Colhado 21; Rebs: Colhado 9 Asts: Colhado 6 |

Domo Bolivariano, Barquisimeto

21 May 2016
11:30

Report

| Paraguay | 62–56 | Uruguay |
Scoring by quarter: 18–13, 12–14, 12–14, 20–15
| Pts: Caraves 26; Rebs: Mercado 11; Asts: Mercado 6 | | Pts: Pereyra 15; Rebs: Somma 9 Asts: Bello 4 |

Domo Bolivariano, Barquisimeto

21 May 2016
16:45

Report

| Brazil | 104–54 | Chile |
Scoring by quarter: 26–13, 22–12, 29–11, 27–18
| Pts: Iziane 16; Rebs: Colhado 9 Asts: Joice 7 | | Pts: Cousiño 19; Rebs: Abuyeres 8 Asts: Fuentes, Angotzi 4 |

Domo Bolivariano, Barquisimeto

22 May 2016
11:30

Report

| Chile | 69–83 | Paraguay |
Scoring by quarter: 20–27, 15–22, 13–19, 21–15
| Pts: Gómez 27; Rebs: Fuentes 11; Asts: Cousiño 6 | | Pts: Mercado 24; Rebs: Caraves 9 Asts: Mercado 6 |

Domo Bolivariano, Barquisimeto

22 May 2016
13:45

Report

| Colombia | 55–76 | Brazil |
Scoring by quarter: 11–17, 11–18, 15–25, 18–16
| Pts: Mosquera 12; Rebs: Mosquera 5 Asts: Palacio, Muñoz 3 | | Pts: Iziane 22; Rebs: Colhado 11; Asts: Justino 3 |

Domo Bolivariano, Barquisimeto

23 May 2016
16:30

Report

| Uruguay | 53–68 | Chile |
Scoring by quarter: 14–22, 13–15, 9–10, 17–21
| Pts: Pereyra 22; Rebs: Somma 11; Asts: Somma 3 | | Pts: Gómez 19; Rebs: Gómez 15; Asts: Morales 6 |

Domo Bolivariano, Barquisimeto

23 May 2016
16:45

Report

| Paraguay | 58–92 | Colombia |
Scoring by quarter: 12–20, 13–23, 22–20, 11–29
| Pts: Mercado, Insfrán 14; Rebs: three players 4 Asts: Caraves 4 | | Pts: Mosquera 23; Rebs: Muñoz 10; Asts: Martínez 8 |

Domo Bolivariano, Barquisimeto

24 May 2016
16:45

Report

| Colombia | 83–42 | Uruguay |
Scoring by quarter: 16–10, 18–8, 22–8, 27–16
| Pts: Delgado 23; Rebs: Prens 12; Asts: Tapias, Rios 7 | | Pts: Pereyra 11; Rebs: Sergio 6 Asts: Martinelli, Bello 3 |

Domo Bolivariano, Barquisimeto

24 May 2016
19:00

Report

| Brazil | 128–35 | Paraguay |
Scoring by quarter: 39–19, 32–4, 28–5, 29–7
| Pts: Patty 19; Rebs: Santos 11; Asts: Joice 15 | | Pts: Huttemann 11; Rebs: Niz 7 Asts: Mercado, Caraves 2 |

Domo Bolivariano, Barquisimeto

=== Group B ===
| Pos | Team | Pld | W | L | PF | PA | PD | Pts | Qualification |
|---|---|---|---|---|---|---|---|---|---|
| 1 | Venezuela | 3 | 3 | 0 | 244 | 165 | +79 | 6 | Semifinals |
| 2 | Argentina | 3 | 2 | 1 | 227 | 121 | +106 | 5 | Semifinals |
| 3 | Ecuador | 3 | 1 | 2 | 166 | 219 | −53 | 4 | 5th place match |
| 4 | Peru | 3 | 0 | 3 | 124 | 256 | −132 | 3 | |

Source: FIBA

21 May 2016
13:45

Report

| Argentina | 71–35 | Ecuador |
Scoring by quarter: 17–7, 16–11, 13–6, 25–11
| Pts: Vega 19; Rebs: Vega 12; Asts: Santana, Gretter 4 | | Pts: Yépez 16; Rebs: Salcedo 5 Asts: five players 1 |

Domo Bolivariano, Barquisimeto

21 May 2016
19:00

Report

| Peru | 52–82 | Venezuela |
Scoring by quarter: 15–21, 12–15, 10–25, 15–21
| Pts: Porras 22; Rebs: Vega 9 Asts: Vega 4 | | Pts: Pérez 20; Rebs: Wallen 11; Asts: Pérez 7 |

Domo Bolivariano, Barquisimeto

22 May 2016
16:45

Report

| Argentina | 89–15 | Peru |
Scoring by quarter: 31–2, 17–5, 15–0, 26–8
| Pts: Thomas 15; Rebs: Vega 10; Asts: Gretter 10 | | Pts: Farfán 5 Rebs: Vega 7 Asts: three players 1 |

Domo Bolivariano, Barquisimeto

22 May 2016
19:00

Report

| Ecuador | 46–91 | Venezuela |
Scoring by quarter: 10–25, 13–22, 6–25, 17–19
| Pts: Salcedo 14; Rebs: Salcedo 5 Asts: three players 3 | | Pts: Pérez 16; Rebs: three players 6 Asts: Silva 6 |

Domo Bolivariano, Barquisimeto

23 May 2016
13:45

Report

| Ecuador | 85–57 | Peru |
Scoring by quarter: 24–14, 23–16, 23–15, 15–12
| Pts: Salcedo 16; Rebs: Caicedo 8 Asts: Caicedo 5 | | Pts: Farfán 18; Rebs: Vega 6 Asts: Vega 3 |

Domo Bolivariano, Barquisimeto

23 May 2016
16:00

Report

| Venezuela | 71–67 (OT) | Argentina |
Scoring by quarter: 16–16, 9–20, 26–14, 9–10, Overtime: 11–7
| Pts: Márquez 23; Rebs: Pérez 9 Asts: Pérez 9 | | Pts: Vega 22; Rebs: Vega 13; Asts: Gretter 6 |

Domo Bolivariano, Barquisimeto

== 5th place match ==
25 May 2016
14:30

Report

| Paraguay | 72–52 | Ecuador |
Scoring by quarter: 19–9, 12–16, 22–10, 19–17
| Pts: Mercado 19; Rebs: Peña, Mercado 9 Asts: Mercado 8 | | Pts: Salcedo 19; Rebs: Salcedo 11; Asts: Gencón 3 |

Domo Bolivariano, Barquisimeto

== Playoffs ==
Semifinals
25 May 2016 – Barquisimeto
Brazil | 73
Argentina | 57
25 May 2016 – Barquisimeto
Venezuela | 67
Colombia | 59

Final
26 May 2016 – Barquisimeto
Brazil | 94
Venezuela | 75
3rd place match
26 May 2016 – Barquisimeto
Argentina | 55
Colombia | 59

=== Semifinals ===
25 May 2016
16:45

Report

| Brazil | 73–57 | Argentina |
Scoring by quarter: 18–10, 16–15, 17–26, 22–6
| Pts: Iziane 19; Rebs: Colhado 12; Asts: Joice 7 | | Pts: Vega 14; Rebs: Vega 6 Asts: Gretter 6 |

Domo Bolivariano, Barquisimeto

25 May 2016
19:00

Report

| Venezuela | 67–59 | Colombia |
Scoring by quarter: 15–13, 17–14, 23–12, 12–20
| Pts: Perez 17; Rebs: Perez 10; Asts: Marquez, Perez 4 | | Pts: Martinez 23; Rebs: Mosquera 11; Asts: Palacio 10 |

Domo Bolivariano, Barquisimeto

=== 3rd place match ===
26 May 2016
16:45

Report

| Argentina | 55–59 | Colombia |
Scoring by quarter: 14–17, 9–13, 19–14, 13–15
| Pts: Boquete 14; Rebs: three players 6 Asts: Fiorotto, Flores 2 | | Pts: Palacio 17; Rebs: Prens 14; Asts: Palacio 5 |

Domo Bolivariano, Barquisimeto

=== Final ===
26 May 2016
19:00

Report

| Brazil | 94–75 | Venezuela |
Scoring by quarter: 28–12, 27–13, 20–23, 19–27
| Pts: Iziane 20; Rebs: Colhado 12; Asts: Joice 11 | | Pts: Silva 18; Rebs: Corrales 5 Asts: Perez 5 |

Domo Bolivariano, Barquisimeto

== Final standings ==
| Rank | Team | Record |
|---|---|---|
| 1st place, gold medalist(s) | Brazil | 6–0 |
| 2nd place, silver medalist(s) | Venezuela | 4–1 |
| 3rd place, bronze medalist(s) | Colombia | 4–2 |
| 4 | Argentina | 2–3 |
| 5 | Paraguay | 3–2 |
| 6 | Ecuador | 2–2 |
| 7 | Chile | 1–3 |
| 8 | Peru | 0–3 |
| 9 | Uruguay | 0–4 |

| Qualified for the 2017 FIBA Women's AmeriCup |
| Qualified for the 2017 FIBA Women's AmeriCup as hosts |
