= 2026 South American Women's Basketball Championship =

Tournament details
- Host country: Argentina
- City: Zárate
- Dates: 3–9 August
- Teams: 7 (from 1 sub-confederation)
- Venue: 1 (in 1 host city)

Final positions
- Champions: Argentina (4th title)
- Runners-up: Venezuela
- Third place: Brazil
- Fourth place: Colombia

Tournament statistics
- Games played: 17
- MVP: (Argentina) Melisa Gretter
- Top scorer: (Paraguay) Paola Ferrari (16.5 ppg)

Official website
- Zárate 2026

The 2026 South American Women's Basketball Championship, officially branded as the 2027 FIBA Women's AmeriCup South American Qualifiers, was the 39th edition of the tournament ran by FIBA Americas for South American women's basketball teams. Seven teams competed in the tournament, which took place at Espacio DAM in Zárate, Argentina, from 3 to 9 August 2026.

The top four teams qualified for the 2027 FIBA Women's AmeriCup in El Salvador.

Argentina came into the tournament as the defending champions after beating Brazil 84–76 in the 2024 final in Santiago. They successfully defended their title, defeating Venezuela 53–44 in the final to clinch their fourth South American title. As the top four finishers, Argentina, Venezuela, Brazil and Colombia qualified for the 2027 FIBA Women's AmeriCup.

== Participating teams ==
Seven teams took part, two less than the previous edition. Bolivia and Ecuador did not enter after taking part in 2024.

- Argentina (hosts)
- Brazil
- Chile
- Colombia
- Paraguay
- Uruguay
- Venezuela

== Venue ==
The venue for the entire competition was the Espacio DAM in Zárate.

| 2026 South American Women's Basketball Championship is located in Argentina | Zárate |
|---|---|
| 2026 South American Women's Basketball Championship is located in Argentina | Espacio DAM |
| 2026 South American Women's Basketball Championship is located in Argentina | Capacity: 2,500 |

== Draw ==
- 2026 South American Women's Basketball Championship – Draw
- Draw Live Stream

The draw took place on 14 July 2026 at 14:00 EST at the FIBA Americas’ regional office in Miami, United States. The draw was hosted by competitions manager for FIBA Americas, Oswaldo Piñeiro. The draw started with, in order, pots 1, 2 and 3 being drawn, with each team selected then allocated into the first available group alphabetically. The position for the team within the group would then be drawn (for the purpose of the schedule). There were no restrictions.

=== Seeding ===
The seeding was based on the FIBA Women's World Ranking as of 1 April 2026.

Pot 1
| Team | Pos |
|---|---|
| Brazil | 9 |
| Colombia | 20 |

Pot 2
| Team | Pos |
|---|---|
| Argentina (H) | 23 |
| Venezuela | 49 |

Pot 3
| Team | Pos |
|---|---|
| Chile | 71 |
| Paraguay | 75 |
| Uruguay | 97 |

=== Draw results ===
Group A
| Pos | Team |
|---|---|
| A1 | Colombia |
| A2 | Paraguay |
| A3 | Uruguay |
| A4 | Argentina (H) |

Group B
| Pos | Team |
|---|---|
| B1 | Chile |
| B2 | Venezuela |
| B3 | Brazil |

== Schedule ==
Schedule
| Round | Gameday | Date |
|---|---|---|
| Preliminary round | Gameday 1 | 3 August 2026 |
| Preliminary round | Gameday 2 | 4 August 2026 |
| Preliminary round | Gameday 3 | 6 August 2026 |
| Final round | Quarterfinals | 7 August 2026 |
| Final round | Semifinals | 8 August 2026 |
| Final round | Third place game | 9 August 2026 |
| Final round | Final | 9 August 2026 |

== Squads ==
Each nation has to submit a list of 12 players.

== Referees ==
The following 12 referees were selected for the tournament.

- (Argentina) Patricia Vivanco
- (Argentina) Romina Belén Morales Ibarra
- (Bolivia) Daniel Jiménez
- (Bolivia) Jassmany Choque
- (Brazil) João Varella
- (Chile) Mariajesús González
- (Colombia) Carlos Vélez
- (Mexico) Krishna Dominguez
- (Paraguay) Nicolás Flores
- (Puerto Rico) Carmelo de la Rosa
- (Venezuela) Daniel Garcia
- (Uruguay) Aline García

== Format ==
The teams were drawn into two groups, one with three teams and the other with four. The group winners advanced directly to the semifinals. The second- and third-placed teams from both groups advanced to the quarterfinals. The fourth-placed team were dropped to the 5th–7th place playoffs, where they were joined by the losing quarterfinalists.

== Group phase ==
- The schedule was released on 24 July 2026.

=== Classification of teams ===
1. Highest number of points earned, with each game result having a corresponding point:
  - Win: 2 points
  - Loss: 1 point
  - Loss by default: 1 point, with a final score of 2–0 for the opponents of the defaulting team if the latter team is not trailing or if the score is tied, or the score at the time of stoppage if they are trailing.
  - Loss by forfeit: 0 points, with a final score of 20–0 for the opponents of the forfeiting team.
2. Head-to-head record via points system above
3. Point difference in games among tied teams
4. Points for in games among tied teams
5. Point difference in all group games
6. Points for in all group games

=== Group A ===
| Pos | Team | Pld | W | L | PF | PA | PD | Pts | Qualification |
|---|---|---|---|---|---|---|---|---|---|
| 1 | Argentina (H) | 3 | 3 | 0 | 211 | 135 | +76 | 6 | Semifinals |
| 2 | Colombia | 3 | 2 | 1 | 196 | 177 | +19 | 5 | Quarterfinals |
| 3 | Paraguay | 3 | 1 | 2 | 162 | 215 | −53 | 4 | Quarterfinals |
| 4 | Uruguay | 3 | 0 | 3 | 173 | 215 | −42 | 3 | 5th–7th place semifinal |

Source: FIBA
Rules for classification: 1) Points; 2) Head-to-head results; 3) Points difference; 4) Points scored.
(H) Hosts

3 August 2026
17:30

Boxscore

| Paraguay | 68–63 | Uruguay |
Scoring by quarter: 12–21, 21–13, 20–14, 15–15
| Pts: Peralta 16; Rebs: Pereira 10; Asts: Pereira 5 | | Pts: Niski 15; Rebs: Schiavo 7 Asts: Niski 6 |

Espacio DAM, Zárate
Referees: Krishna Domínguez (MEX), Carmelo de la Rosa (PUR), Jassmany Choque (BOL)

3 August 2026
21:00

Boxscore

| Colombia | 42–66 | Argentina |
Scoring by quarter: 15–17, 13–15, 10–15, 4–19
| Pts: Muñoz 8 Rebs: Zúñiga, López 6 Asts: Ríos 4 | | Pts: Cabrera 17; Rebs: Cabrera 11; Asts: Gretter 4 |

Espacio DAM, Zárate
Referees: Daniel García (VEN), Mariajesús González (CHI), João Varella (BRA)

4 August 2026
17:30

Boxscore

| Uruguay | 65–83 | Colombia |
Scoring by quarter: 18–27, 18–17, 18–16, 11–23
| Pts: Zeballos 14; Rebs: Rivera 9 Asts: Niski 4 | | Pts: Ríos 20; Rebs: Paz 14; Asts: Ríos 8 |

Espacio DAM, Zárate
Referees: Daniel García (VEN), Carmelo de la Rosa (PUR), Daniel Jiménez (BOL)

4 August 2026
21:00

Boxscore

| Argentina | 81–48 | Paraguay |
Scoring by quarter: 16–14, 19–12, 23–14, 23–8
| Pts: Fernández 13; Rebs: Cabrera 12; Asts: Gretter 12 | | Pts: Duarte 11; Rebs: Duarte, Pereira 5 Asts: Pereira 5 |

Espacio DAM, Zárate
Referees: Krishna Domínguez (MEX), João Varella (BRA), Jassmany Choque (BOL)

6 August 2026
17:30

Boxscore

| Colombia | 71–46 | Paraguay |
Scoring by quarter: 23–9, 18–12, 19–16, 11–9
| Pts: Paz 16; Rebs: Moscarella 11; Asts: Ríos 8 | | Pts: Ferrari 14; Rebs: Niz 9 Asts: four players 2 |

Espacio DAM, Zárate
Referees: Daniel García (VEN), Krishna Domínguez (MEX), Daniel Jiménez (BOL)

6 August 2026
21:00

Boxscore

| Uruguay | 45–64 | Argentina |
Scoring by quarter: 16–20, 6–20, 11–8, 12–16
| Pts: Niski 14; Rebs: Barbato 7 Asts: Gayoso, Schiavo 2 | | Pts: Chagas 12; Rebs: Cabrera 6 Asts: Gretter 9 |

Espacio DAM, Zárate
Referees: João Varella (BRA), Mariajesús González (CHI), Jassmany Choque (BOL)

=== Group B ===
| Pos | Team | Pld | W | L | PF | PA | PD | Pts | Qualification |
|---|---|---|---|---|---|---|---|---|---|
| 1 | Venezuela | 2 | 2 | 0 | 133 | 108 | +25 | 4 | Semifinals |
| 2 | Brazil | 2 | 1 | 1 | 142 | 128 | +14 | 3 | Quarterfinals |
| 3 | Chile | 2 | 0 | 2 | 108 | 147 | −39 | 2 | Quarterfinals |

Source: FIBA
Rules for classification: 1) Points; 2) Head-to-head results; 3) Points difference; 4) Points scored.

3 August 2026
14:00

Boxscore

| Chile | 57–85 | Brazil |
Scoring by quarter: 12–23, 12–21, 20–14, 13–27
| Pts: Retamales 13; Rebs: Oliva 6 Asts: Campos, Mella 3 | | Pts: Nascimento 17; Rebs: Vasconcelos 11; Asts: Guyton 6 |

Espacio DAM, Zárate
Referees: Aline García (URU), Romina Morales (ARG), Patricia Vivanco (ARG)

4 August 2026
14:00

Boxscore

| Venezuela | 62–51 | Chile |
Scoring by quarter: 15–13, 16–9, 12–15, 19–14
| Pts: Wallen 17; Rebs: Rivera, Wallen 11; Asts: Wallen 5 | | Pts: García 15; Rebs: Ojeda 8 Asts: García 5 |

Espacio DAM, Zárate
Referees: Carlos Vélez (COL), Nicolás Flores (PAR), Romina Morales (ARG)

6 August 2026
14:00

Boxscore

| Brazil | 57–71 | Venezuela |
Scoring by quarter: 18–19, 10–20, 14–15, 15–17
| Pts: Nascimento 17; Rebs: Moura 6 Asts: Marçal 4 | | Pts: Wallen 23; Rebs: Wallen 13; Asts: Montero 7 |

Espacio DAM, Zárate
Referees: Carlos Vélez (COL), Aline García (URU), Patricia Vivanco (ARG)

== Knockout phase ==
=== Brackets ===
Quarterfinals
7 August
Brazil | 74
Paraguay | 46
7 August
Colombia | 78
Chile | 51

Semifinals
8 August
Argentina | 72
Brazil | 66
8 August
Venezuela | 68
Colombia | 64

Final
9 August
Argentina | 53
Venezuela | 44
Third place game
9 August
Brazil | 61
Colombia | 48

5th–7th place semifinal
8 August
Uruguay | 66
Chile | 58

Fifth place game
9 August
Paraguay | 73
Uruguay | 55

=== Quarterfinals ===
7 August 2026
17:30

Boxscore

| Colombia | 78–51 | Chile |
Scoring by quarter: 19–1, 26–12, 14–13, 19–25
| Pts: Delgado 15; Rebs: Zúñiga 9 Asts: Ríos 4 | | Pts: Campos 18; Rebs: Campos, Oliva 6 Asts: Campos, Pérez 4 |

Espacio DAM, Zárate
Referees: Krishna Domínguez (MEX), Nicolás Flores (PAR), Carmelo de la Rosa (PUR)

7 August 2026
21:00

Boxscore

| Brazil | 74–46 | Paraguay |
Scoring by quarter: 23–6, 26–16, 15–11, 10–13
| Pts: Moura 16; Rebs: Nascimento 10; Asts: Guyton, Queiroz 3 | | Pts: Ferrari 20; Rebs: Ferrari 10; Asts: Peralta 5 |

Espacio DAM, Zárate
Referees: Carlos Vélez (COL), Aline García (URU), Mariajesús González (CHI)

=== 5th–7th place semifinal ===
8 August 2026
14:00

Boxscore

| Uruguay | 66–58 | Chile |
Scoring by quarter: 16–13, 22–6, 17–24, 11–15
| Pts: Gayoso, Rivera 14; Rebs: Niski 8 Asts: Niski 5 | | Pts: Ojeda 22; Rebs: Campos, Ojeda 7 Asts: García 5 |

Espacio DAM, Zárate
Referees: Carlos Vélez (COL), Romina Morales (ARG), Patricia Vivanco (ARG)

=== Semifinals ===
8 August 2026
17:30

Boxscore

| Venezuela | 68–64 | Colombia |
Scoring by quarter: 16–14, 16–16, 26–7, 10–27
| Pts: Rivera 20; Rebs: Herlihy 13; Asts: Wallen 6 | | Pts: Ríos 21; Rebs: Paz 9 Asts: Ríos 8 |

Espacio DAM, Zárate
Referees: Aline García (URU), Carmelo de la Rosa (PUR), Daniel Jiménez (BOL)

8 August 2026
21:00

Boxscore

| Argentina | 72–66 | Brazil |
Scoring by quarter: 21–21, 15–14, 20–11, 16–20
| Pts: Gretter 20; Rebs: Cabrera 13; Asts: Gretter 9 | | Pts: Nascimento 22; Rebs: Carrera 6 Asts: Guyton, Nascimento 4 |

Espacio DAM, Zárate
Referees: Krishna Domínguez (MEX), Nicolás Flores (PAR), Jassmany Choque (BOL)

=== Fifth place game ===
9 August 2026
14:00

Boxscore

| Paraguay | 73–55 | Uruguay |
Scoring by quarter: 19–10, 23–14, 14–13, 17–18
| Pts: Ferreira 22; Rebs: Peralta 13; Asts: Peralta 11 | | Pts: Auza 15; Rebs: Fernández 10; Asts: Schiavo 3 |

Espacio DAM, Zárate
Referees: Mariajesús González (CHI), Daniel Jiménez (BOL), Romina Morales (ARG)

=== Third place game ===
9 August 2026
17:30

Boxscore

| Brazil | 61–48 | Colombia |
Scoring by quarter: 16–15, 13–13, 18–9, 14–11
| Pts: Guyton 18; Rebs: Moura 7 Asts: Guyton, Nascimento 4 | | Pts: Muñoz 13; Rebs: Muñoz, Paz 7 Asts: Ríos 7 |

Espacio DAM, Zárate
Referees: Daniel García (VEN), Nicolás Flores (PAR), Carmelo de la Rosa (PUR)

=== Final ===
9 August 2026
21:00

Boxscore

| Argentina | 53–44 | Venezuela |
Scoring by quarter: 13–17, 19–7, 11–12, 10–8
| Pts: Gretter 17; Rebs: Cabrera 9 Asts: Gretter 4 | | Pts: Herlihy, Rivera 11; Rebs: Herlihy 10; Asts: four players 2 |

Espacio DAM, Zárate
Referees: Krishna Domínguez (MEX), João Varella (BRA), Jassmany Choque (BOL)

== Final standings ==
| Pos | Team | Pld | W | L | PF | PA | PD | Pts | Qualification |
|---|---|---|---|---|---|---|---|---|---|
| 1st place, gold medalist(s) | Argentina | 5 | 5 | 0 | 336 | 245 | +91 | 10 | Qualified for the 2027 FIBA Women's AmeriCup |
| 2nd place, silver medalist(s) | Venezuela | 4 | 3 | 1 | 245 | 225 | +20 | 7 | Qualified for the 2027 FIBA Women's AmeriCup |
| 3rd place, bronze medalist(s) | Brazil | 5 | 3 | 2 | 343 | 294 | +49 | 8 | Qualified for the 2027 FIBA Women's AmeriCup |
| 4 | Colombia | 6 | 3 | 3 | 386 | 357 | +29 | 9 | Qualified for the 2027 FIBA Women's AmeriCup |
| 5 | Paraguay | 5 | 2 | 3 | 281 | 344 | −63 | 7 | |
| 6 | Uruguay | 5 | 1 | 4 | 294 | 346 | −52 | 6 | |
| 7 | Chile | 4 | 0 | 4 | 217 | 291 | −74 | 4 | |

Source: FIBA

== Awards ==
2026 South American Women's Basketball Championship

Argentina
Fourth title

Team roster: Dalma Piri, Julia Fernandez, Laila Raviolo, Diana Cabrera, Julieta Mungo, Agostina Burani, Melisa Gretter, Paula Lopez, Sofia Lombardero, Florencia Chagas, Victoria Gauna, Sol Castro.
Head Coach: Gregorio Martinez

The awards were announced on 10 August 2026.

All-Tournament Team
| Guards | Forwards |
|---|---|
| (Argentina) Melisa Gretter (Colombia) Manuela Ríos (Argentina) Florencia Chagas (Brazil) Aaliyah Guyton | (Venezuela) Daniela Wallen |
MVP: (Argentina) Melisa Gretter

=== Notable statistics ===
- Most points in a game: 148 (Uruguay 92–87 Colombia, 4 August)
- Fewest points in a game: 97 (Argentina 53–44 Venezuela, 9 August)
- Most points by a team in a game: 85 (Chile 57–85 Brazil, 3 August)
- Fewest points by a team in a game: 42 (Colombia 42–66 Argentina, 3 August)
- Biggest points difference in a game: 33 (Argentina 81–48 Paraguay, 4 August)
- Biggest half time deficit in a game: 32 (Colombia 45–13 Chile, 7 August)
- Most points scored by a player in a game: 23 (Daniela Wallen vs Brazil, 6 August)

Reference
Gameday 1
Gameday 2
Gameday 3
Gameday 4
Gameday 5
Gameday 6
