= Basketball at the 2019 Pan American Games – Women's tournament =

Basketball at the 2019 Pan American Games
- Basketball pictogram
- Venue: Coliseo Eduardo Dibos
- Dates: August 6–10, 2019
- Competitors: 96 from 8 nations

Medalists
Gold medal	Brazil
Silver medal	United States
Bronze medal	Puerto Rico

The women's basketball tournament at the 2019 Pan American Games was held in Lima, Peru at the Coliseo Eduardo Dibos from 6 August to 10 August. The teams were grouped into two pools of four teams each for a round-robin preliminary round. The top two teams in each group advanced to a single elimination bracket. Brazil won the gold medal, the first since 1991 in Havana, after defeating the United States in the final.

== Qualification ==
A total of eight teams qualified to compete at the games. The top seven teams at the 2017 FIBA AmeriCup have qualified, plus Olympic Champions United States. The host nation Peru was barred from participating by FIBA, following sanctions imposed on the Peruvian Basketball Federation. Colombia took the vacated berth.

=== Summary ===
Event	Date	Location	Vacancies	Qualified
Host Nation	—	—	~~1~~ 0	~~Peru~~
Olympic Champions	—	—	1	United States
2017 FIBA Women's AmeriCup	August 6–13	(Argentina) Buenos Aires	~~6~~ 7	Canada; Argentina; Puerto Rico; Brazil; Virgin Islands; Paraguay; Colombia
Total			8	

== Draw ==
The draw was held in San Juan, Puerto Rico on 23 May 2019.

Pot 1	Pot 2	Pot 3	Pot 4
United States; Canada	Brazil; Argentina	Puerto Rico; Colombia	Virgin Islands; Paraguay

== Rosters ==
At the start of tournament, all eight participating countries had up to 12 players on their rosters.

- Argentina
- Brazil
- Canada
- Colombia
- Paraguay
- Puerto Rico
- United States
- Virgin Islands

== Competition format ==
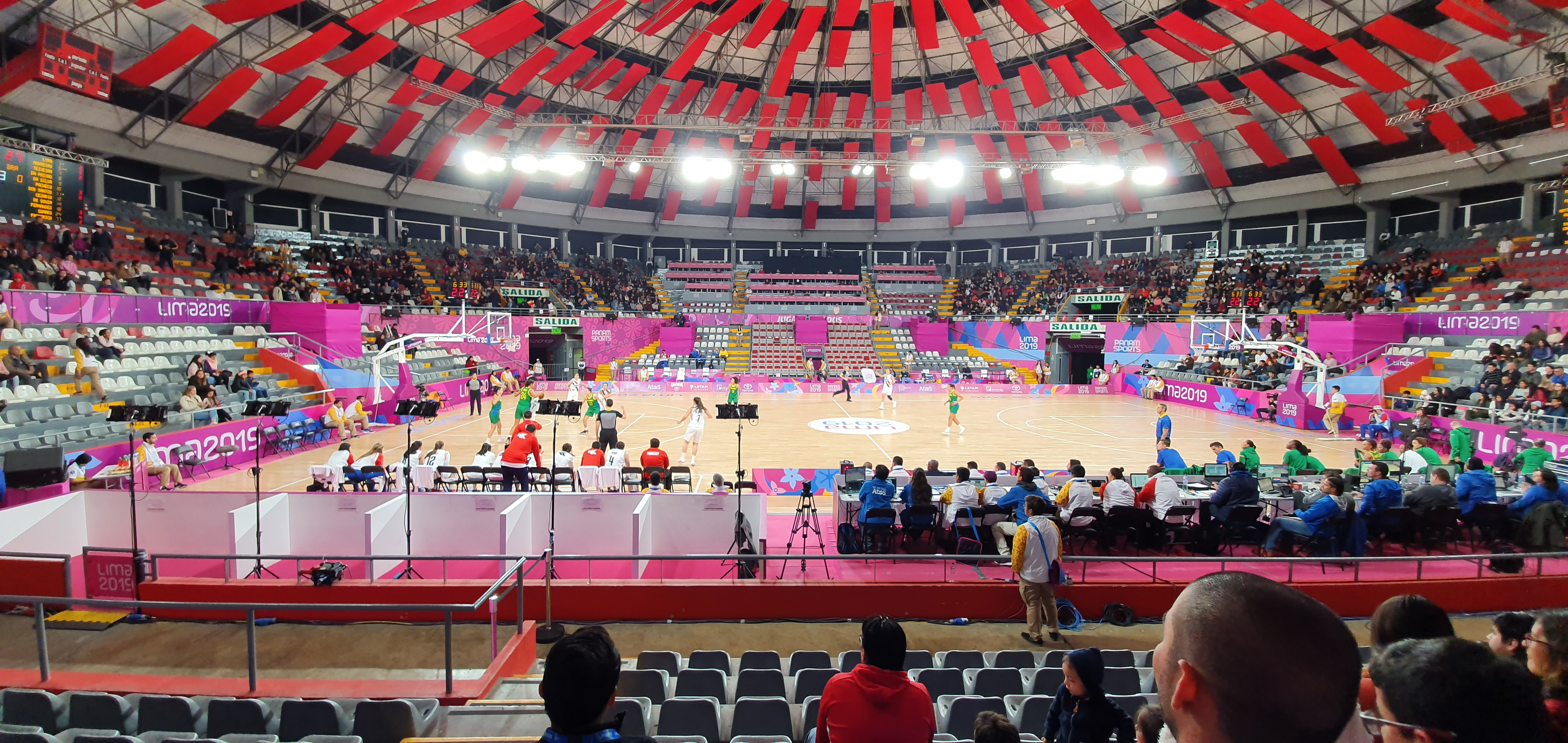
The competition was played in the Coliseo Dibós arena.

In the first round of the competition, teams are divided into two pools of four teams, and play follows a round robin format with each of the teams playing all other teams in the pool once. Teams are awarded two points for a win, and one point for a loss.

Following the completion of the pool games, the top two teams from each pool advance to a single elimination round consisting of two semifinal games, and the bronze and gold medal matches. Losing teams compete in classification matches to determine their ranking in the tournament.

== Results ==
All times are local (UTC−5)

=== Preliminary round ===
==== Group A ====
Team	Pld	W	L	PF	PA	PD	Pts	Qualification
Brazil	3	3	0	224	166	+58	6	Qualified for the Semifinals
Puerto Rico	3	2	1	221	200	+21	5	Qualified for the Semifinals
Canada	3	1	2	224	215	+9	4	
Paraguay	3	0	3	174	262	−88	3	

6 August 2019
10:30

Report

Puerto Rico	91–73	Paraguay
Scoring by quarter: 26–14, 18–18, 24–21, 23–20
Pts: Gwathmey 21; Rebs: Rosado 11; Asts: O'Neill 6		Pts: Ferrari 18; Rebs: Ferrari 8 Asts: Ferrari 6

Coliseo Eduardo Dibos, Lima
Referees: Leandro Lezcano (ARG)

6 August 2019
13:30

Report

Canada	71–79	Brazil
Scoring by quarter: 21–24, 19–16, 12–19, 19–20
Pts: Pellington 21; Rebs: Hamblin 10; Asts: Pellington, Scott 3		Pts: Dos Santos 15; Rebs: Dos Santos 11; Asts: three players 3

Coliseo Eduardo Dibos, Lima
Referees: Steven Anderson (USA)

7 August 2019
10:30

Report

Paraguay	64–90	Canada
Scoring by quarter: 17–22, 18–19, 13–23, 16–26
Pts: Ferrari 28; Rebs: Ferrari, Caraves 5 Asts: Peralta 3		Pts: Hill 14; Rebs: Hamblin 10; Asts: Pellington 3

Coliseo Eduardo Dibos, Lima
Referees: Steven Anderson (USA)

7 August 2019
21:00

Report

Brazil	64–58	Puerto Rico
Scoring by quarter: 13–14, 19–17, 19–9, 13–18
Pts: Dos Santos, De Souza 12; Rebs: Dos Santos 4 Asts: Costa 5		Pts: O'Neill 23; Rebs: Pagan 7 Asts: Meléndez, Gwathmey 2

Coliseo Eduardo Dibos, Lima
Referees: Leandro Lezcano (ARG)

8 August 2019
18:00

Report

Paraguay	37–81	Brazil
Scoring by quarter: 10–21, 12–14, 5–21, 10–25
Pts: Ferrari 10; Rebs: Ferrari 7 Asts: Insfrán, Caraves 2		Pts: Soares 15; Rebs: Teixeira 8 Asts: Paixão 4

Coliseo Eduardo Dibos, Lima
Referees: Andrés Bartel (URU)

8 August 2019
21:00

Report

Canada	63–72	Puerto Rico
Scoring by quarter: 17–26, 11–14, 17–12, 18–20
Pts: Scott 16; Rebs: Jerome 7 Asts: Pellington, Jerome 2		Pts: Gwathmey 22; Rebs: Gibson 7 Asts: O'Neill, Gwathmey 4

Coliseo Eduardo Dibos, Lima
Referees: Leonardo Zalazar (ARG)

==== Group B ====
Team	Pld	W	L	PF	PA	PD	Pts	Qualification
United States	3	3	0	248	180	+68	6	Qualified for the Semifinals
Colombia	3	2	1	152	141	+11	5	Qualified for the Semifinals
Argentina	3	1	2	135	149	−14	3 (Note: Argentina did not receive a point for the forfeit loss to Colombia.)	
Virgin Islands	3	0	3	180	245	−65	3	

Notes:

6 August 2019
18:00

Report

Colombia	69–66	Virgin Islands
Scoring by quarter: 17–21, 16–14, 16–16, 20–15
Pts: Arias 21; Rebs: Mosquera 18; Asts: Palacio 5		Pts: Day 23; Rebs: Day 15; Asts: three players 2

Coliseo Eduardo Dibos, Lima
Referees: Jorge Vázquez (PUR)

6 August 2019
21:00

Report

United States	70–62	Argentina
Scoring by quarter: 23–16, 10–18, 18–13, 19–15
Pts: Carter 14; Rebs: Onyenwere 12; Asts: Harris, Carter 2		Pts: Boquete, González 14; Rebs: Burani 8 Asts: Gretter 8

Coliseo Eduardo Dibos, Lima
Referees: Michael Weiland (CAN)

7 August 2019
13:30

Report

Argentina	0–20 (forfeit)	Colombia

Coliseo Eduardo Dibos, Lima
Referees: Daniel García (VEN)

7 August 2019
18:00

Report

Virgin Islands	55–103	United States
Scoring by quarter: 10–34, 11–21, 13–23, 21–25
Pts: Day 20; Rebs: George 6 Asts: Day 3		Pts: Mikesell 16; Rebs: P. Williams, Onyenwere 6 Asts: K. Williams 6

Coliseo Eduardo Dibos, Lima
Referees: Andrés Bartel (URU)

8 August 2019
10:30

Report

Argentina	73–59	Virgin Islands
Scoring by quarter: 19–19, 19–11, 17–18, 18–11
Pts: Llorente 19; Rebs: Llorente 8 Asts: Gretter 5		Pts: George 32; Rebs: George 14; Asts: Tate 3

Coliseo Eduardo Dibos, Lima
Referees: Jorge Vázquez (PUR)

8 August 2019
13:30

Report

United States	75–63	Colombia
Scoring by quarter: 24–13, 23–8, 12–18, 16–24
Pts: Mompremier 15; Rebs: Onyenwere 9 Asts: Harris, Pivec 3		Pts: Muñoz 11; Rebs: Mosquera 8 Asts: Ríos, Mosquera 2

Coliseo Eduardo Dibos, Lima
Attendance: Cristiano Maranho (BRA)

=== Classification round ===
==== Placement stage (5th–8th place) ====
7th place
9 August
Paraguay	69
Virgin Islands	61

5th place
9 August
Canada	54
Argentina	59

==== Seventh place match ====
9 August 2019
10:30

Report

Paraguay	69–61	Virgin Islands
Scoring by quarter: 23–14, 12–15, 19–22, 15–10
Pts: Ferrari 28; Rebs: Ferrari 6 Asts: Ferrari 7		Pts: George 19; Rebs: George 13; Asts: Tate 5

Coliseo Eduardo Dibos, Lima
Referees: Andréia Silva (BRA)

==== Fifth place match ====
9 August 2019
13:30

Report

Canada	54–59	Argentina
Scoring by quarter: 9–17, 14–8, 8–20, 23–14
Pts: Pellington 18; Rebs: Hamblin 12; Asts: Scott 2		Pts: Boquete 18; Rebs: Burani, Santana 9 Asts: Gretter 11

Coliseo Eduardo Dibos, Lima
Referees: Cristiano Maranho (BRA)

=== Knockout round ===
Semifinals
9 August — Coliseo Eduardo Dibos
Brazil	62
Colombia	48
9 August — Coliseo Eduardo Dibos
United States	62
Puerto Rico	59

Final
10 August — Coliseo Eduardo Dibos
Brazil	79
United States	73
Third place
10 August — Coliseo Eduardo Dibos
Colombia	55
Puerto Rico	66

==== Semifinals ====
9 August 2019
18:00

Report

Brazil	62–48	Colombia
Scoring by quarter: 13–17, 16–4, 20–14, 13–13
Pts: Dos Santos 18; Rebs: Dos Santos 13; Asts: De Souza 4		Pts: Muñoz 9 Rebs: Mosquera 7 Asts: Arias 2

Coliseo Eduardo Dibos, Lima
Referees: Luis Vázquez (PUR)

9 August 2019
21:00

Report

United States	62–59	Puerto Rico
Scoring by quarter: 18–21, 15–9, 17–16, 12–13
Pts: Carter, Mompremier 14; Rebs: Mompremier 12; Asts: K. Williams 4		Pts: O'Neill 19; Rebs: Meléndez 8 Asts: O'Neill, Rosado 3

Coliseo Eduardo Dibos, Lima
Referees: Leandro Lezcano (ARG)

==== Bronze medal match ====
10 August 2019
18:00

Report

Colombia	55–66	Puerto Rico
Scoring by quarter: 9–13, 6–23, 22–14, 18–16
Pts: Mosquera 13; Rebs: Mosquera 6 Asts: Ríos 3		Pts: Gwathmey 13; Rebs: Gwathmey 14; Asts: Rosado 6

Coliseo Eduardo Dibos, Lima
Referees: Leonardo Zalazar (ARG)

==== Gold medal match ====
10 August 2019
21:00

Report

Brazil	79–73	United States
Scoring by quarter: 20–22, 19–16, 16–15, 24–20
Pts: Paixão 24; Rebs: Paixão 7 Asts: Paixão 3		Pts: Carter, Mompremier 16; Rebs: Mompremier 12; Asts: Harris 5

Coliseo Eduardo Dibos, Lima
Referees: Leandro Lezcano (ARG)

== Final standings ==
Rank	Team	Record
1st place, gold medalist(s)	Brazil	5–0
2nd place, silver medalist(s)	United States	4–1
3rd place, bronze medalist(s)	Puerto Rico	3–2
4	Colombia	2–3
5	Argentina	2–3
6	Canada	1–4
7	Paraguay	1–4
8	Virgin Islands	0–5
