= 2019 FIBA Women's AmeriCup =

15th FIBA Women's Americas Basketball Championship

Tournament details
- Host country: Puerto Rico
- Dates: 22–29 September
- Teams: 10 (from 1 confederation)
- Venue: 1 (in 1 host city)

Final positions
- Champions: United States (3rd title)

Tournament statistics
- MVP: (United States) Sylvia Fowles
- Top scorer: (Paraguay) Ferrari (19.5)
- Top rebounds: (Canada) Alexander (10.2)
- Top assists: (Colombia) Ríos (5.4)
- PPG (Team): United States (88.7)
- RPG (Team): United States (54.7)
- APG (Team): United States (25.0)

Official website
- Official website

The 2019 FIBA Women's AmeriCup was held in San Juan, Puerto Rico from 22 to 29 September 2019.

The United States won their third title by defeating Canada in the final.

== Venue ==
| San Juan | 2019 FIBA Women's AmeriCup is located in Puerto Rico |
| Roberto Clemente Coliseum | 2019 FIBA Women's AmeriCup is located in Puerto Rico |
| Capacity: 9,000 | 2019 FIBA Women's AmeriCup is located in Puerto Rico |

== Qualification ==
- Host nation
  - Puerto Rico
- North America Subzone:
  - Canada (qualified automatically)
  - United States (qualified automatically)
- Central America and Caribbean Subzone: 2018 Centrobasket Women
  - Cuba
  - Mexico
  - Dominican Republic
- South America Subzone: 2018 South American Basketball Championship for Women
  - Argentina (Champion)
  - Brazil
  - Colombia
  - Paraguay

== Draw ==
The draw was held on 23 July 2019 in San Juan, Puerto Rico.

| Pair 1 | Pair 2 | Pair 3 | Pair 4 | Pair 5 |
|---|---|---|---|---|
| Canada; United States | Brazil; Cuba | Colombia; Mexico | Paraguay; Dominican Republic | Argentina; Puerto Rico |

== Squads ==
Each team consisted of 12 players.

== Preliminary round ==
All times are local (UTC−4).

=== Group A ===
| Pos | Team | Pld | W | L | PF | PA | PD | Pts | Qualification |
|---|---|---|---|---|---|---|---|---|---|
| 1 | Canada | 4 | 4 | 0 | 352 | 204 | +148 | 8 | Semifinals |
| 2 | Puerto Rico (H) | 4 | 3 | 1 | 290 | 228 | +62 | 7 | Semifinals |
| 3 | Cuba | 4 | 2 | 2 | 236 | 291 | −55 | 6 | |
| 4 | Dominican Republic | 4 | 1 | 3 | 235 | 276 | −41 | 5 | |
| 5 | Mexico | 4 | 0 | 4 | 206 | 320 | −114 | 4 | |

Source: FIBA
Rules for classification: 1) Points; 2) Head-to-head results; 3) Points difference; 4) Points scored.
(H) Hosts

22 September 2019
12:30

Boxscore

| Mexico | 53–109 | Canada |
Scoring by quarter: 13–31, 7–20, 21–27, 12–31
| Pts: Luna-Castro 12; Rebs: Luna-Castro 5 Asts: three players 3 | | Pts: Scott 21; Rebs: Alexander 11; Asts: Hill 9 |

Roberto Clemente Coliseum, San Juan
Referees: Amy Bonner (USA), Gina Cross (USA), Rodrigo Mejía (COL)

22 September 2019
20:00

Boxscore

| Cuba | 55–80 | Puerto Rico |
Scoring by quarter: 10–21, 20–20, 10–25, 15–14
| Pts: Amargo 20; Rebs: Galindo 9 Asts: Amargo 4 | | Pts: Gibson 14; Rebs: Quiñones 9 Asts: Salamán 8 |

Roberto Clemente Coliseum, San Juan
Referees: Fabricio Vito (ARG), Andreia Silva (BRA), Norval Young (IVB)

23 September 2019
12:30

Boxscore

| Dominican Republic | 67–52 | Mexico |
Scoring by quarter: 9–8, 20–18, 20–14, 18–12
| Pts: Zapata 20; Rebs: Reynoso 10; Asts: Morton 6 | | Pts: Luna-Castro 16; Rebs: Morton 10; Asts: Ávila 5 |

Roberto Clemente Coliseum, San Juan
Referees: Amy Bonner (USA), Andreia Silva (BRA), Rodrigo Mejía (COL)

23 September 2019
17:30

Boxscore

| Canada | 87–51 | Cuba |
Scoring by quarter: 14–13, 21–14, 24–18, 28–8
| Pts: Alexander 23; Rebs: Alexander 15; Asts: four players 3 | | Pts: Galindo 15; Rebs: Calvo 5 Asts: Martínez 4 |

Roberto Clemente Coliseum, San Juan
Referees: Gina Cross (USA), Fabricio Vito (ARG), Nicolás Flores (PAR)

24 September 2019
15:00

Boxscore

| Cuba | 65–62 | Dominican Republic |
Scoring by quarter: 13–18, 19–13, 19–18, 14–13
| Pts: Amargo 30; Rebs: Ávila 16; Asts: Ávila, Galindo 6 | | Pts: Morton 17; Rebs: Monsac 10; Asts: Morton 6 |

Roberto Clemente Coliseum, San Juan
Referees: Gina Cross (USA), Andreia Silva (BRA), Juan Figueroa (PUR)

24 September 2019
20:00

Boxscore

| Puerto Rico | 50–78 | Canada |
Scoring by quarter: 12–24, 10–12, 12–23, 16–19
| Pts: Rosado 11; Rebs: four players 3 Asts: O'Neill, Rosado 3 | | Pts: Scott 20; Rebs: Alexander, Scott 9 Asts: Hill 9 |

Roberto Clemente Coliseum, San Juan
Referees: Amy Bonner (USA), Fabricio Vito (ARG), Nicolás Flores (PAR)

25 September 2019
12:30

Boxscore

| Mexico | 62–65 | Cuba |
Scoring by quarter: 16–16, 13–18, 13–12, 20–19
| Pts: Luna-Castro 13; Rebs: Luna-Castro 14; Asts: Ávila 4 | | Pts: Amargo 22; Rebs: Ávila 15; Asts: Ávila 4 |

Roberto Clemente Coliseum, San Juan
Referees: Amy Bonner (USA), Nicolás Flores (PAR), Norval Young (IVB)

25 September 2019
20:00

Boxscore

| Dominican Republic | 56–81 | Puerto Rico |
Scoring by quarter: 9–18, 12–17, 22–19, 13–27
| Pts: Monsac 20; Rebs: Monsac 13; Asts: Morton 5 | | Pts: O'Neill, Salamán 15; Rebs: Gibson 7 Asts: Rosado 7 |

Roberto Clemente Coliseum, San Juan
Referees: Gina Cross (USA), Fabricio Vito (ARG), Rodrigo Mejía (COL)

26 September 2019
17:30

Boxscore

| Canada | 78–50 | Dominican Republic |
Scoring by quarter: 20–11, 19–13, 19–14, 20–12
| Pts: Carleton 15; Rebs: Alexander 10; Asts: three players 4 | | Pts: three players 9 Rebs: Jones 5 Asts: Monsac, Zapata 3 |

Roberto Clemente Coliseum, San Juan
Referees: Amy Bonner (USA), Nicolás Flores (PAR), Rodrigo Mejía (COL)

26 September 2019
20:00

Boxscore

| Puerto Rico | 79–39 | Mexico |
Scoring by quarter: 22–8, 20–6, 20–9, 17–16
| Pts: Kuzmanic, Pagan 12; Rebs: Rosado 9 Asts: Rosado 8 | | Pts: Ávila 10; Rebs: Luna-Castro 9 Asts: Ávila 3 |

Roberto Clemente Coliseum, San Juan
Referees: Gina Cross (USA), Andreia Silva (BRA), Norval Young (IVB)

=== Group B ===
| Pos | Team | Pld | W | L | PF | PA | PD | Pts | Qualification |
|---|---|---|---|---|---|---|---|---|---|
| 1 | United States | 4 | 4 | 0 | 387 | 200 | +187 | 8 | Semifinals |
| 2 | Brazil | 4 | 3 | 1 | 317 | 258 | +59 | 7 | Semifinals |
| 3 | Colombia | 4 | 2 | 2 | 254 | 277 | −23 | 6 | |
| 4 | Argentina | 4 | 1 | 3 | 244 | 303 | −59 | 5 | |
| 5 | Paraguay | 4 | 0 | 4 | 195 | 359 | −164 | 4 | |

Source: FIBA
Rules for classification: 1) Points; 2) Head-to-head results; 3) Points difference; 4) Points scored.

22 September 2019
15:00

Boxscore

| Paraguay | 31–110 | United States |
Scoring by quarter: 11–28, 7–28, 5–30, 8–24
| Pts: Peralta 9 Rebs: Ferrari 8 Asts: Ferrari, Peralta 2 | | Pts: DeShields 20; Rebs: Fowles 14; Asts: DeShields 8 |

Roberto Clemente Coliseum, San Juan
Referees: Maripier Malo (CAN), Roberto Mota (DOM), Yuliet Méndez (CUB)

22 September 2019
17:30

Boxscore

| Brazil | 67–61 | Colombia |
Scoring by quarter: 15–18, 13–10, 19–21, 20–12
| Pts: Dos Santos 14; Rebs: De Souza 10; Asts: Costa 5 | | Pts: Muñoz 19; Rebs: Martínez 10; Asts: Ríos 6 |

Roberto Clemente Coliseum, San Juan
Referees: Jesed Díaz (PUR), Hortencia Sánchez (MEX), Americo Rodríguez (VEN)

23 September 2019
15:00

Boxscore

| Colombia | 74–51 | Paraguay |
Scoring by quarter: 21–14, 19–14, 23–14, 11–9
| Pts: Muñoz 16; Rebs: Paz 15; Asts: Ríos 4 | | Pts: Ferrari 20; Rebs: Caraves 9 Asts: Ferrari, Peralta 3 |

Roberto Clemente Coliseum, San Juan
Referees: Hortencia Sánchez (MEX), Roberto Mota (DOM), Yuliet Méndez (CUB)

23 September 2019
20:00

Boxscore

| Argentina | 49–76 | Brazil |
Scoring by quarter: 8–13, 4–14, 22–26, 15–23
| Pts: Boquete 10; Rebs: Llorente 7 Asts: Durso 4 | | Pts: Teixeira 15; Rebs: Dos Santos 16; Asts: Costa 4 |

Roberto Clemente Coliseum, San Juan
Referees: Maripier Malo (CAN), Americo Rodríguez (VEN), Krishna Domínguez (MEX)

24 September 2019
12:30

Boxscore

| United States | 88–46 | Colombia |
Scoring by quarter: 21–11, 23–15, 24–13, 20–7
| Pts: Fowles 22; Rebs: Nelson-Ododa 8 Asts: Canada 8 | | Pts: Muñoz 20; Rebs: Martínez 6 Asts: Ríos 4 |

Roberto Clemente Coliseum, San Juan
Referees: Roberto Mota (DOM), Maripier Malo (CAN), Krishna Domínguez (MEX)

24 September 2019
17:30

Boxscore

| Paraguay | 54–74 | Argentina |
Scoring by quarter: 14–14, 17–25, 12–18, 11–17
| Pts: Ferrari 27; Rebs: Caraves 14; Asts: Peralta 6 | | Pts: Burani 22; Rebs: Burani 11; Asts: Boquete 8 |

Roberto Clemente Coliseum, San Juan
Referees: Jesed Díaz (PUR), Hortencia Sánchez (MEX), Yuliet Méndez (CUB)

25 September 2019
15:00

Boxscore

| Brazil | 101–59 | Paraguay |
Scoring by quarter: 22–20, 28–13, 19–20, 32–6
| Pts: Dantas 22; Rebs: Dantas 7 Asts: Gonçalo 6 | | Pts: Ferrari 25; Rebs: Ferrari 7 Asts: Peralta 4 |

Roberto Clemente Coliseum, San Juan
Referees: Jesed Díaz (PUR), Hortencia Sánchez (MEX), Krishna Domínguez (MEX)

25 September 2019
17:30

Boxscore

| Argentina | 50–100 | United States |
Scoring by quarter: 13–24, 11–23, 9–24, 17–29
| Pts: Durso 12; Rebs: Durso 8 Asts: Durso 3 | | Pts: Samuelson 16; Rebs: Samuelson, Sykes 7 Asts: Canada 9 |

Roberto Clemente Coliseum, San Juan
Referees: Roberto Mota (DOM), Maripier Malo (CAN), Yuliet Méndez (CUB)

26 September 2019
12:30

Boxscore

| Colombia | 73–71 (2OT) | Argentina |
Scoring by quarter: 6–17, 24–10, 9–18, 15–9, Overtime: 8–8, 11–9
| Pts: Ríos 17; Rebs: Martínez 10; Asts: Ríos 7 | | Pts: González 16; Rebs: Llorente 18; Asts: Burani 5 |

Roberto Clemente Coliseum, San Juan
Referees: Jesed Díaz (PUR), Maripier Malo (CAN), Krishna Domínguez (MEX)

26 September 2019
15:00

Boxscore

| United States | 89–73 | Brazil |
Scoring by quarter: 24–16, 29–24, 19–12, 17–21
| Pts: DeShields 19; Rebs: Charles 10; Asts: Canada 6 | | Pts: Dantas 16; Rebs: Dantas, De Souza 5 Asts: Gonçalo 4 |

Roberto Clemente Coliseum, San Juan
Referees: Roberto Mota (DOM), Hortencia Sánchez (MEX), Americo Rodríguez (VEN)

== Knockout stage ==
=== Bracket ===
Semifinals
28 September
Canada | 66
Brazil | 58
28 September
United States | 78
Puerto Rico | 54

Final
29 September
Canada | 46
United States | 67
Third place
29 September
Brazil | 95
Puerto Rico | 66

=== Semifinals ===
28 September 2019
17:30

Boxscore

| Canada | 66–58 | Brazil |
Scoring by quarter: 15–11, 11–17, 17–17, 23–13
| Pts: Colley 23; Rebs: Raincock-Ekunwe 10; Asts: four players 2 | | Pts: Dantas 16; Rebs: Dantas, De Souza 9 Asts: Paixão 5 |

Roberto Clemente Coliseum, San Juan
Referees: Fabricio Vito (ARG), Krishna Domínguez (MEX), Nicolás Flores (PAR)

28 September 2019
20:00

Boxscore

| United States | 78–54 | Puerto Rico |
Scoring by quarter: 19–10, 19–12, 17–14, 23–18
| Pts: Fowles 17; Rebs: Fowles 13; Asts: Collier 4 | | Pts: Rosado 12; Rebs: Quiñones 5 Asts: Gwathmey 3 |

Roberto Clemente Coliseum, San Juan
Referees: Hortencia Sánchez (MEX), Roberto Mota (DOM), Rodrigo Mejía (COL)

=== Seventh place game ===
28 September 2019
12:30

Boxscore

| Dominican Republic | 67–65 | Argentina |
Scoring by quarter: 12–9, 17–17, 14–24, 24–15
| Pts: Morton 18; Rebs: Reynoso 12; Asts: Evangelista 4 | | Pts: Boquete 14; Rebs: Burani 6 Asts: De la Barba 6 |

Roberto Clemente Coliseum, San Juan
Referees: Gina Cross (USA), Andreia Silva (BRA), Yuliet Méndez (CUB)

=== Fifth place game ===
28 September 2019
15:00

Boxscore

| Cuba | 62–75 | Colombia |
Scoring by quarter: 19–11, 13–20, 18–21, 12–23
| Pts: Galindo 13; Rebs: Galindo 10; Asts: Ávila, Galindo 5 | | Pts: Muñoz 14; Rebs: Paz 10; Asts: Ríos 6 |

Roberto Clemente Coliseum, San Juan
Referees: Amy Bonner (USA), Jesed Díaz (PUR), Maripier Malo (CAN)

=== Third place game ===
29 September 2019
17:30

Boxscore

| Brazil | 95–66 | Puerto Rico |
Scoring by quarter: 24–17, 20–16, 32–16, 19–17
| Pts: Dantas 28; Rebs: De Souza 10; Asts: Dantas 8 | | Pts: Salamán 15; Rebs: Gwathmey 6 Asts: Salamán 4 |

Roberto Clemente Coliseum, San Juan
Referees: Fabricio Vito (ARG), Krishna Domínguez (MEX), Maripier Malo (CAN)

=== Final ===
29 September 2019
20:00

Boxscore

| Canada | 46–67 | United States |
Scoring by quarter: 9–14, 15–20, 14–23, 8–10
| Pts: Scott 12; Rebs: Scott 7 Asts: Hill 2 | | Pts: Charles, Fowles 12; Rebs: Charles, Collier 11; Asts: Collier, DeShields 3 |

Roberto Clemente Coliseum, San Juan
Referees: Andreia Silva (BRA), Nicolás Flores (PAR), Rodrigo Mejía (COL)

== Final standing ==
| Qualified for Americas pre-qualifying tournaments |

| Rank | Team | Record |
|---|---|---|
| 1st place, gold medalist(s) | United States | 6–0 |
| 2nd place, silver medalist(s) | Canada | 5–1 |
| 3rd place, bronze medalist(s) | Brazil | 4–2 |
| 4 | Puerto Rico | 3–3 |
| 5 | Colombia | 3–2 |
| 6 | Cuba | 2–3 |
| 7 | Dominican Republic | 2–3 |
| 8 | Argentina | 1–4 |
| 9 | Mexico | 0–4 |
| 10 | Paraguay | 0–4 |

== Statistics and awards ==
=== Statistical leaders ===
Points

| Name | PPG |
|---|---|
| (Paraguay) Paola Ferrari | 19.5 |
| (Cuba) Yamara Amargo | 19.0 |
| (Brazil) Damiris Dantas | 17.3 |
| (Colombia) Jenifer Muñoz | 16.4 |
| (Canada) Kayla Alexander | 15.6 |

Rebounds

| Name | RPG |
|---|---|
| (Canada) Kayla Alexander | 10.2 |
| (Argentina) Victoria Llorente | 9.8 |
| (Mexico) Jacqueline Luna-Castro | 9.5 |
| (Dominican Republic) Sugeiry Monsac | 8.8 |
| (Paraguay) María Caraves | 8.3 |

Assists

| Name | APG |
|---|---|
| (Colombia) Manuela Ríos | 5.4 |
| (United States) Jordin Canada | 5.3 |
| (Puerto Rico) Pamela Rosado | 4.7 |
| (Canada) Sami Hill | 4.5 |
| (Dominican Republic) Yohanna Morton | 4.2 |

Blocks

| Name | BPG |
|---|---|
| (Dominican Republic) Giocelis Reynoso | 1.8 |
| (Colombia) Yuliany Paz | 1.4 |
| (Brazil) Érika de Souza | 1.2 |
| Seven players | 1.0 |

Steals

| Name | SPG |
|---|---|
| (Colombia) Jenifer Muñoz | 2.8 |
| (Canada) Bridget Carleton | 2.7 |
| (Dominican Republic) Julady Zapata | 2.4 |
| (Cuba) Klavdia Calvo | 1.8 |
| (Cuba) Anisleidy Galindo | 1.8 |
| (Colombia) Manuela Ríos | 1.8 |

=== Awards ===
The MVP was announced on 30 September 2019.

All-Star Team
| Guard | Forwards | Centers |
|---|---|---|
| (United States) Jordin Canada | (United States) Diamond DeShields (Brazil) Damiris Dantas | (Canada) Kayla Alexander (United States) Sylvia Fowles |
MVP: (United States) Sylvia Fowles
