= 2015 FIBA Americas Women's Championship =

13th FIBA Women's Americas Basketball Championship

Tournament details
- Host country: Canada
- City: Edmonton
- Dates: 8–16 August 2015
- Teams: 10 (from 1 confederation)
- Venue: 1 (in 1 host city)

Final positions
- Champions: Canada (2nd title)

Tournament statistics
- MVP: (Canada) Kia Nurse
- Top scorer: (Cuba) Yamara Amargo (15.7)
- Top rebounds: (Brazil) Nadia Colhado (11.3)
- Top assists: (Cuba) Ineidis Casanova (7.7)
- PPG (Team): Canada (92.5)
- RPG (Team): Canada (48.5)
- APG (Team): Canada (23.7)

Official website
- 2015 FIBA Americas Championship

The 2015 FIBA Americas Championship for Women, held in Edmonton, Alberta, Canada, was the qualifying tournament for FIBA Americas at the 2016 Summer Olympics Basketball Tournament in Brazil. The champion qualified directly for the Olympics.

On the first day of the tournament, at coincident FIBA Central Board meetings in Tokyo, Brazil's men's and women's teams were granted automatic entry to the Olympic Tournament as highly ranked host teams.

After allowing for Brazil's and the tournament winner's direct qualification for the Olympics, the next highest three teams in this tournament went to the final 2016 Summer Olympics Basketball Qualifying Tournament, competing against the highest placed non-winners of the other regional Championships. As Brazil fell in the semifinals, Puerto Rico and Venezuela, as the third-placed teams in their groups, contested a fifth-place match. Venezuela eventually won that match and qualified for the Olympic qualifying tournament.

Canada went on to win its second title - defeating Cuba - the first after 20 years, when the tournament was also held in Canada.

== Qualification ==
- Host country
  - Canada (10)
- Central American and Caribbean Sub-Zone: (2014 Centrobasket Women)
  - Cuba (13)
  - Puerto Rico (28)
  - Dominican Republic (37)
  - Virgin Islands (-)
- South American Sub-Zone: 2014 South American Basketball Championship for Women
  - Brazil (7)
  - Argentina (14)
  - Chile (26)
  - Venezuela (34)
- Repechage winner:
  - Ecuador (-)

Note: 2014 FIBA Ranking in parentheses.

== Venue ==
2015 FIBA Americas Women's Championship (Canada)

FIBA Americas awarded the hosting rights of the championship to Canada Basketball. All games were held at the Saville Community Sports Centre at the University of Alberta's South Campus in Edmonton.

== Preliminary round ==
All times local (UTC−6)

=== Group A ===
Pos	Team	Pld	W	L	PF	PA	PD	Pts	Qualification
1	Canada (H)	4	4	0	390	172	+218	8	Advance to the final round
2	Cuba	4	3	1	279	225	+54	7	Advance to the final round
3	Puerto Rico	4	2	2	271	281	−10	6	Fifth place match
4	Chile	4	1	3	251	329	−78	5	
5	Dominican Republic	4	0	4	192	346	−154	4	

First match(es) will be played: 9 August. Source: FIBA Americas
Rules for classification: (1) Tournament points, (2) Head-to-head tournament points, (3) Head-to-head goal average, (4) Overall goal average, (5) Drawing of lots
(H) Hosts

9 August
13:00

Boxscore

Chile	88–56	Dominican Republic
Scoring by quarter: 21–12, 25–19, 18–17, 24–8
Pts: Morrison 28; Rebs: Morrison 14; Asts: Basáez 6		Pts: Estrella 12; Rebs: three players 6 Asts: Monsac 3

Saville Community Sports Centre, Edmonton

9 August
18:30

Boxscore

Canada	94–57	Puerto Rico
Scoring by quarter: 30–22, 26–7, 23–12, 15–16
Pts: three players 11; Rebs: Langlois 8 Asts: Thorburn 4		Pts: Placido 12; Rebs: Placido 5 Asts: Bermúdez 2

Saville Community Sports Centre, Edmonton

10 August
18:30

Boxscore

Canada	93–36	Chile
Scoring by quarter: 27–10, 17–10, 22–6, 27–10
Pts: three players 14; Rebs: K. Plouffe 8 Asts: Langlois 10		Pts: Abuyeres 11; Rebs: Fuentes, Abuyeres 5 Asts: Gamboa 2

Saville Community Sports Centre, Edmonton

10 August
20:45

Boxscore

Cuba	83–44	Dominican Republic
Scoring by quarter: 20–10, 15–10, 27–8, 21–16
Pts: Amargo 25; Rebs: Oquendo 8 Asts: Casanova 12		Pts: Evangelista, Hernández 14; Rebs: Beltré 7 Asts: Abreu 3

Saville Community Sports Centre, Edmonton

11 August
13:00

Boxscore

Puerto Rico	58–65	Cuba
Scoring by quarter: 14–17, 11–15, 20–14, 13–19
Pts: Delgado 14; Rebs: Sepúlveda 6 Asts: four players 1		Pts: Amargo 26; Rebs: Noblet 12; Asts: Casanova 7

Saville Community Sports Centre, Edmonton

11 August
18:30

Boxscore

Dominican Republic	36–111	Canada
Scoring by quarter: 7–23, 12–35, 8–27, 9–26
Pts: Evangelista 15; Rebs: Monsac 5 Asts: Monsac 3		Pts: Ayim 15; Rebs: Gaucher 7 Asts: Langlois, Thorburn 7

Saville Community Sports Centre, Edmonton

12 August
13:00

Boxscore

Chile	61–88	Cuba
Scoring by quarter: 17–18, 13–19, 17–26, 14–25
Pts: Cousiño 16; Rebs: Basáez, Fuentes 7 Asts: Basáez 7		Pts: Noblet 16; Rebs: Noblet 8 Asts: Casanova 7

Saville Community Sports Centre, Edmonton

12 August
15:15

Boxscore

Dominican Republic	56–64	Puerto Rico
Scoring by quarter: 14–12, 14–19, 15–11, 13–22
Pts: Evangelista, Hernández 16; Rebs: Monsac 12; Asts: Evangelista, Monsac 3		Pts: García 16; Rebs: Placido 12; Asts: Delgado 8

Saville Community Sports Centre, Edmonton

13 August
15:15

Boxscore

Puerto Rico	92–66	Chile
Scoring by quarter: 19–16, 19–17, 31–19, 23–14
Pts: Martínez 22; Rebs: Bermúdez 8 Asts: Delgado 7		Pts: Leeper 18; Rebs: Basáez, Leeper 5 Asts: Cousiño 4

Saville Community Sports Centre, Edmonton

13 August
18:30

Boxscore

Cuba	43–92	Canada
Scoring by quarter: 13–21, 6–21, 11–21, 13–29
Pts: Galindo 12; Rebs: Galindo 6 Asts: Casanova 2		Pts: Nurse 14; Rebs: Ayim 7 Asts: Fields 4

Saville Community Sports Centre, Edmonton

=== Group B ===
Pos	Team	Pld	W	L	PF	PA	PD	Pts	Qualification
1	Argentina	4	4	0	289	210	+79	8	Advance to the final round
2	Brazil	4	3	1	303	247	+56	7	Advance to the final round
3	Venezuela	4	2	2	250	267	−17	6	Fifth place match
4	Ecuador	4	1	3	200	249	−49	5	
5	Virgin Islands	4	0	4	219	288	−69	4	

First match(es) will be played: 9 August. Source: FIBA Americas
Rules for classification: (1) Tournament points, (2) Head-to-head tournament points, (3) Head-to-head goal average, (4) Overall goal average, (5) Drawing of lots

9 August
15:15

Boxscore

Ecuador	72–48	Virgin Islands
Scoring by quarter: 21–7, 14–6, 13–18, 24–17
Pts: Mora 16; Rebs: Salcedo 9 Asts: Noblecilla 7		Pts: Day 11; Rebs: Day, Hamilton 11; Asts: Bough 4

Saville Community Sports Centre, Edmonton

9 August
20:45

Boxscore

Brazil	86–71	Venezuela
Scoring by quarter: 24–18, 19–22, 17–13, 26–18
Pts: Ramona 16; Rebs: Colhado 14; Asts: Paixão, Ramona 4		Pts: Corrales 17; Rebs: Corrales 6 Asts: Márquez, Durán 3

Saville Community Sports Centre, Edmonton

10 August
13:00

Boxscore

Ecuador	35–70	Argentina
Scoring by quarter: 5–16, 6–17, 10–18, 14–19
Pts: Salcedo 8 Rebs: Preciado 5 Asts: three players 2		Pts: Burani 14; Rebs: three players 8 Asts: González 5

Saville Community Sports Centre, Edmonton

10 August
15:15

Boxscore

Virgin Islands	62–69	Venezuela
Scoring by quarter: 17–10, 14–22, 15–18, 16–19
Pts: Matthew, Hamilton 20; Rebs: Hamilton 14; Asts: Bough 7		Pts: Silva 31; Rebs: Corrales 7 Asts: Márquez, Durán 4

Saville Community Sports Centre, Edmonton

11 August
15:15

Boxscore

Argentina	75–51	Virgin Islands
Scoring by quarter: 17–12, 15–8, 25–17, 18–14
Pts: Vega 15; Rebs: Vega 7 Asts: González 6		Pts: Day 21; Rebs: Day 14; Asts: Matthew 3

Saville Community Sports Centre, Edmonton

11 August
20:45

Boxscore

Brazil	76–45	Ecuador
Scoring by quarter: 17–14, 17–5, 26–18, 16–8
Pts: Castro Marques 19; Rebs: Colhado 22; Asts: Paixão, Santos 5		Pts: Caicedo 14; Rebs: Caicedo 7 Asts: Caicedo 6

Saville Community Sports Centre, Edmonton

12 August
18:30

Boxscore

Venezuela	55–71	Argentina
Scoring by quarter: 9–22, 17–11, 18–26, 11–12
Pts: Silva 13; Rebs: Silva 4 Asts: three players 3		Pts: Vega 16; Rebs: Vega 8 Asts: Rosset 5

Saville Community Sports Centre, Edmonton

12 August
20:45

Boxscore

Virgin Islands	58–72	Brazil
Scoring by quarter: 17–20, 14–19, 11–22, 16–11
Pts: Day, Hamilton 16; Rebs: Hamilton 11; Asts: Frettt, Hamilton 4		Pts: Colhado 15; Rebs: Colhado 9 Asts: Paixão, Castro Marques 6

Saville Community Sports Centre, Edmonton

13 August
13:00

Boxscore

Venezuela	55–48	Ecuador
Scoring by quarter: 15–11, 13–10, 12–13, 15–14
Pts: Márquez 15; Rebs: Corrales 11; Asts: Silva 3		Pts: Barahona 14; Rebs: Barahona 6 Asts: Noblecilla 4

Saville Community Sports Centre, Edmonton

13 August
20:45

Boxscore

Argentina	73–69	Brazil
Scoring by quarter: 21–12, 17–12, 17–25, 18–20
Pts: Boquete, González 12; Rebs: Santana 7 Asts: Gretter 4		Pts: Castro Marques 25; Rebs: Colhado 9 Asts: Paixão 4

Saville Community Sports Centre, Edmonton

== Final round ==
Semi-finals
15 August
Canada	83
Brazil	66
15 August
Argentina	79
Cuba (OT)	89

Final
16 August
Canada	82
Cuba	66
Third place
16 August
Brazil	59
Argentina	66

=== Semifinals ===
15 August
15:30

Boxscore

Argentina	79–89 (OT)	Cuba
Scoring by quarter: 21–25, 12–20, 27–13, 13–15, Overtime: 6–16
Pts: Santana 18; Rebs: Gretter 9 Asts: Gretter 9		Pts: Noblet 29; Rebs: Noblet 14; Asts: Casanova 9

Saville Community Sports Centre, Edmonton

15 August
18:00

Boxscore

Canada	83–66	Brazil
Scoring by quarter: 27–22, 18–17, 25–16, 13–11
Pts: Raincock-Ekunwe 18; Rebs: Raincock-Ekunwe, Murphy 5 Asts: Langlois 7		Pts: Castro Marques 15; Rebs: Colhado 8 Asts: Castro Marques 3

Saville Community Sports Centre, Edmonton

=== Fifth place match ===
15 August
13:15

Boxscore

Puerto Rico	56–65	Venezuela
Scoring by quarter: 24–9, 10–20, 6–18, 16–18
Pts: Delgado, Placido 11; Rebs: Bermúdez 7 Asts: Delgado 7		Pts: Wallen 18; Rebs: Wallen 11; Asts: Márquez 7

Saville Community Sports Centre, Edmonton

=== Third place match ===
16 August
15:30

Boxscore

Brazil	59–66	Argentina
Scoring by quarter: 13–18, 11–12, 17–19, 18–17
Pts: Justino 19; Rebs: three players 6 Asts: three players 2		Pts: Fiorotto 13; Rebs: Fiorotto, Vega 5 Asts: Gretter 4

Saville Community Sports Centre, Edmonton

=== Final ===
16 August
18:00

Boxscore

Canada	82–66	Cuba
Scoring by quarter: 19–22, 25–13, 21–19, 17–12
Pts: Nurse 20; Rebs: K. Plouffe 8 Asts: Langlois 8		Pts: Oquendo 25; Rebs: Noblet 10; Asts: Casanova 9

Saville Community Sports Centre, Edmonton

== Final ranking ==
Qualified for the basketball at the 2016 Summer Olympics
Qualified as host nation for the basketball at the 2016 Summer Olympics
Qualified for the 2016 FIBA World Olympic Qualifying Tournament for Women

Rank	Team	Record
1st place, gold medalist(s)	Canada	6–0
2nd place, silver medalist(s)	Cuba	4–2
3rd place, bronze medalist(s)	Argentina	5–1
4	Brazil	3–3
5	Venezuela	3–2
6	Puerto Rico	2–3
7	Ecuador	1–3
8	Chile	1–3
9	Virgin Islands	0–4
10	Dominican Republic	0–4

== All-2015 FIBA Americas Women's Team ==
G – (Argentina) Melisa Gretter
G – (Canada) Kia Nurse (Tournament MVP)
F – (Cuba) Yamara Delgado
F – (Cuba) Clenia Noblet
F – (Canada) Tamara Tatham
