= South American Women's Basketball Championship =

Women's basketball tournament

FIBA South American Women's Basketball Championship
- Current season, competition or edition: 2026 South American Women's Basketball Championship
- Sport: Basketball
- Founded: 1946
- First season: 1946
- No. of teams: 10
- Country: South American countries
- Continent: South America
- Most recent champion: Argentina (4th title)
- Most titles: Brazil (27 titles)
- Related competitions: FIBA Women's AmeriCup
- Website: FIBAAmericas.com

The FIBA South American Women's Basketball Championship was first played in 1946. Female teams from South America take part in this tournament, which often has been played biannually.

== Summaries ==
Year	Host	Gold	Silver	Bronze
1946	Chile (Santiago)	Chile	Brazil	Argentina
1948	Argentina (Buenos Aires)	Argentina	Chile	Peru
1950	Peru (Lima)	Chile	Argentina	Peru
1952	Paraguay (Asunción)	Paraguay	Brazil	Chile
1954	Brazil (São Paulo)	Brazil	Chile	Ecuador
1956	Ecuador (Quito)	Chile	Paraguay	Brazil
1958	Peru (Lima)	Brazil	Argentina	Paraguay
1960	Chile (Santiago)	Chile	Brazil	Peru
1962	Paraguay (Asunción)	Paraguay	Chile	Brazil
1965	Brazil (Rio de Janeiro)	Brazil	Paraguay	Peru
1967	Colombia (Cali)	Brazil	Chile	Peru
1968	Chile (Santiago)	Brazil	Chile	Argentina
1970	Ecuador (Guayaquil)	Brazil	Argentina	Ecuador
1972	Peru (Lima)	Brazil	Peru	Paraguay
1974	Bolivia (La Paz)	Brazil	Argentina	Bolivia
1977	Peru (Lima)	Peru	Brazil	Argentina
1978	Bolivia (La Paz)	Brazil	Bolivia	Argentina
1981	Peru (Lima)	Brazil	Peru	Colombia
1984	Colombia (Cúcuta)	Colombia	Brazil	Peru
1986	Brazil (Guaratinguetá)	Brazil	Peru	Colombia
1989	Chile (Santiago)	Brazil	Peru	Argentina
1991	Colombia (Bogotá)	Brazil	Colombia	Argentina
1993	Bolivia (Cochabamba)	Brazil	Argentina	Chile
1995	Brazil (Jacareí)	Brazil	Argentina	Chile
1997	Chile (Iquique)	Brazil	Argentina	Colombia
1999	Brazil (Vitória)	Brazil	Argentina	Venezuela
2001	Peru (Lima)	Brazil	Argentina	Chile
2003	Ecuador (Loja)	Brazil	Argentina	Chile
2005	Colombia (Bogotá)	Brazil	Colombia	Argentina
2006	Paraguay (Asunción)	Brazil	Argentina	Colombia
2008	Ecuador (Loja)	Brazil	Argentina	Chile
2010	Chile (Santiago)	Brazil	Argentina	Colombia
2013	Argentina (Mendoza)	Brazil	Argentina	Chile
2014	Ecuador (Ambato)	Brazil	Argentina	Venezuela
2016	Venezuela (Barquisimeto)	Brazil	Venezuela	Colombia
2018	Colombia (Tunja)	Argentina	Brazil	Colombia
2022	Argentina (San Luis)	Brazil	Argentina	Colombia
2024	Chile (Santiago)	Argentina	Brazil	Colombia
2026	Argentina (Zárate)	Argentina	Venezuela	Brazil

== Performances by nation ==
Rank	Nation	Gold	Silver	Bronze	Total
1	Brazil	27	7	3	37
2	Argentina	4	16	7	27
3	Chile	4	5	7	16
4	Paraguay	2	2	2	6
5	Peru	1	4	6	11
6	Colombia	1	2	9	12
7	Venezuela	0	2	2	4
8	Bolivia	0	1	1	2
9	Ecuador	0	0	2	2
Totals (9 entries)		39	39	39	117

=== Participation details ===
Team	(Chile) 1946	(Argentina) 1948	(Peru) 1950	(Paraguay) 1952	(Brazil) 1954	(Ecuador) 1956	(Peru) 1958	(Chile) 1960	(Paraguay) 1962	(Brazil) 1965	(Colombia) 1967	(Chile) 1968	(Ecuador) 1970	(Peru) 1972	(Bolivia) 1974	(Peru) 1977	(Bolivia) 1978	(Peru) 1981	(Colombia) 1984	(Brazil) 1986	(Chile) 1989	(Colombia) 1991	(Bolivia) 1993	(Brazil) 1995	(Chile) 1997	(Brazil) 1999	(Peru) 2001	(Ecuador) 2003	(Colombia) 2005	(Paraguay) 2006	(Ecuador) 2008	(Chile) 2010	(Argentina) 2013	(Ecuador) 2014	(Venezuela) 2016	(Colombia) 2018	(Argentina) 2022	(Chile) 2024	(Argentina) 2026	Total
Argentina	3rd	1st	2nd	4th	—	4th	2nd	5th	4th	4th	5th	3rd	2nd	4th	2nd	3rd	3rd	4th	4th	4th	3rd	3rd	2nd	2nd	2nd	2nd	2nd	2nd	3rd	2nd	2nd	2nd	2nd	2nd	4th	1st	2nd	1st	1st	38
Bolivia	4th	—	5th	6th	5th	—	—	—	—	—	—	—	—	7th	3rd	8th	2nd	—	—	—	—	—	5th	—	8th	5th	7th	—	—	8th	—	—	—	—	—	—	—	8th	—	14
Brazil	2nd	—	4th	2nd	1st	3rd	1st	2nd	3rd	1st	1st	1st	1st	1st	1st	2nd	1st	1st	2nd	1st	1st	1st	1st	1st	1st	1st	1st	1st	1st	1st	1st	1st	1st	1st	1st	2nd	1st	2nd	3rd	38
Chile	1st	2nd	1st	3rd	2nd	1st	4th	1st	2nd	5th	2nd	2nd	4th	5th	6th	7th	—	5th	6th	—	4th	—	3rd	3rd	4th	4th	3rd	3rd	5th	4th	3rd	5th	3rd	4th	7th	7th	6th	5th	7th	37
Colombia	—	—	6th	—	—	7th	—	—	—	—	6th	—	7th	6th	—	5th	4th	3rd	1st	3rd	5th	2nd	4th	—	3rd	—	—	—	2nd	3rd	5th	3rd	6th	—	3rd	3rd	3rd	3rd	4th	25
Ecuador	—	—	—	—	3rd	5th	—	—	6th	6th	7th	4th	3rd	8th	—	4th	—	6th	—	—	—	4th	—	—	5th	6th	5th	5th	7th	—	6th	—	—	5th	6th	6th	8th	7th	—	22
Paraguay	—	—	—	1st	—	2nd	3rd	3rd	1st	2nd	4th	6th	5th	3rd	5th	6th	5th	—	5th	—	—	—	—	4th	9th	—	—	—	6th	5th	—	4th	5th	6th	5th	4th	5th	6th	5th	27
Peru	—	3rd	3rd	5th	4th	6th	5th	4th	5th	3rd	3rd	5th	6th	2nd	4th	1st	—	2nd	3rd	2nd	2nd	—	—	—	7th	—	4th	6th	—	7th	—	—	8th	8th	8th	8th	—	—	—	28
Uruguay	—	—	—	—	—	—	—	—	7th	—	—	—	—	—	7th	—	—	—	8th	—	—	—	—	—	—	—	—	—	—	—	—	7th	7th	7th	9th	—	7th	9th	6th	10
Venezuela	—	—	—	—	—	—	—	—	—	—	—	—	8th	—	—	—	—	7th	7th	—	6th	—	—	—	6th	3rd	6th	4th	4th	6th	4th	6th	4th	3rd	2nd	5th	4th	4th	2nd	19

== See also ==
- South American Basketball Championship
