= 1970 South American Basketball Championship for Women =

13th South American Women's Basketball Championship

Tournament details
- Host country: Ecuador
- Dates: September 22 – October 3
- Teams: 8
- Venue: 1 (in 1 host city)

Final positions
- Champions: Brazil (6th title)

The 1970 South American Basketball Championship for Women was the 13th iteration of the tournament, which was hosted in Guayaquil, Ecuador. The winners were Brazil, who won their sixth title to date and fourth consecutive title.

== Tournament ==
The tournament was held in a single round robin format among the eight competing teams. Brazil won all seven of their games. The change in teams from the previous tournament was the return of the Colombian team after missing the previous tournament, as well as the Venezuelan team.

=== Results ===
Pos	Team	Pld	W	L	GF	GA	GD	Pts
1	Brazil	7	7	0	645	376	+269	14
2	Argentina	7	5	2	430	428	+2	12
3	Ecuador	7	4	3	418	363	+55	11
4	Chile	7	4	3	399	388	+11	11
5	Paraguay	7	4	3	458	480	−22	11
6	Peru	7	3	4	420	423	−3	10
7	Colombia	7	1	6	383	496	−113	8
8	Venezuela	7	0	7	371	570	−199	7

Updated to match(es) played on October 3 1970. Source: "archive.fiba.com: 1970 South American Championship for Women". archive.fiba.com. Archived from the original on November 11, 2015.

=== Games ===
Peru	80–52	Venezuela

Ecuador	69–39	Colombia

Argentina	76–63	Venezuela

Chile	62–53	Paraguay

Brazil	107–57	Peru

Brazil	108–46	Venezuela

Ecuador	68–64	Paraguay

Chile	66–53	Colombia

Argentina	63–55	Colombia

Brazil	92–40	Paraguay

Ecuador	38–44	Peru

Argentina	59–54	Peru

Brazil	84–54	Colombia

Argentina	46–42	Chile

Ecuador	80–47	Venezuela

Paraguay	90–72	Venezuela

Peru	78–52	Colombia

Ecuador	60–48	Chile

Chile	58–51	Peru

Brazil	104–76	Argentina

Paraguay	91–70	Colombia

Argentina	50–47	Ecuador

Colombia	60–45	Venezuela

Paraguay	63–60	Argentina

Brazil	79–47	Chile

Chile	76–46	Venezuela

Paraguay	57–56	Peru

Brazil	71–56	Ecuador
