= 1984 South American Basketball Championship for Women =

19th South American Women's Basketball Championship

Tournament details
- Host country: Chile
- Dates: October 5–13
- Teams: 8
- Venue: 1 (in 1 host city)

Final positions
- Champions: Colombia (1st title)

The 1984 South American Basketball Championship for Women was the 19th regional tournament for women in South America. It was held in Cúcuta, Colombia and won by the local squad. Eight teams competed.

== Results ==
Each team played the other teams twice, for a total of eight games played by each team.

Rank	Team	W	L	Pts	Diff
1	Colombia	7	0	14	243
2	Brazil	6	1	13	181
3	Peru	5	2	12	133
4	Argentina	4	3	11	38
5	Paraguay	3	4	10	-12
6	Chile	2	5	9	-27
7	Venezuela	1	5	8	-107
8	Uruguay	0	7	7	-409
