= 1977 South American Basketball Championship for Women =

16th South American Women's Basketball Championship

Tournament details
- Host country: Chile
- Dates: March 13–24
- Teams: 8
- Venue: 1 (in 1 host city)

Final positions
- Champions: Peru (1st title)

The 1977 South American Basketball Championship for Women was the 16th regional tournament for women in South America. It was held in Lima, Peru and won by the local squad. Eight teams competed.

== Results ==
Each team played the other teams twice, for a total of eight games played by each team.

Rank	Team	W	L	Pts	Diff
1	Peru	7	0	14	+177
2	Brazil	6	1	13	+251
3	Argentina	4	3	11	-29
4	Ecuador	3	4	10	-10
5	Colombia	3	4	10	-35
6	Paraguay	3	4	10	-85
7	Chile	2	5	9	-113
8	Bolivia	0	7	7	-156

== Final rankings ==
- Peru
- Brazil
- Argentina
- Ecuador
- Colombia
- Paraguay
- Chile
- Bolivia
