= Hipódromo (Asunción) =

Neighbourhood in Asunción, Paraguay

Coordinates: 25.3168°S 57.5847°W

Hipódromo is a barrio (neighbourhood) of Asunción, the capital of Paraguay. It's a relatively new neighbourhood with a population of 8,348 people, and provides one of the biggest green areas in Asunción. The name comes from the Spanish meaning of the word Hippodrome, which stands for "horse racetrack". This is because the largest horse racetrack in Paraguay, the Hipódromo de Asunción, lies within this barrio.

The name of the streets generally carry the name of characteristic trees from the Paraguayan countryside (such as Yvyrapytá, Quebracho and Paraíso) or the name of native tribes of South America (Carios, Guaraníes and Incas).

This barrio is home to a large number of open areas of recreational uses, such as small parks and plazas. Besides having the Jockey Club other important institutions reside in Hipódromo, such as the Institute of Superior Teaching (Instituto Superior de Enseñanza), the National School of Physical Education (Escuela Nacional de Educación Física), National Sports Council (Consejo Nacional de Deportes) and the Paraguayan Tennis Association (Asociación Paraguaya de Tenis).

One of the most particular sites of this barrio is the "Champions Village" section. The residents of this village are the former players of the women's Paraguay national basketball team that won the 1952 and 1962 Women's South American Championships. The village was built in the early 1970s, when then President Alfredo Stroessner recognized the merit of the players by building them houses.
