= 1954 South American Basketball Championship for Women =

5th South American Women's Basketball Championship

Tournament details
- Host country: Brazil
- Dates: July 15-24
- Teams: 5
- Venue: 1 (in 1 host city)

Final positions
- Champions: Brazil (1st title)

The 1954 South American Basketball Championship for Women was the 5th regional tournament for women in South America. It was held in São Paulo, Brazil and won by the local squad. Five teams competed.

== Final rankings ==
1. Brazil
2. Chile
3. Ecuador
4. Peru
5. Bolivia

== Results ==
Each team played the other teams once, for a total of four games played by each team.

Rank	Team	W	L	Pts	Diff
1	Brazil	4	0	10	+99
2	Chile	3	1	8	+59
3	Ecuador	2	2	8	-21
4	Peru	1	3	7	-66
5	Bolivia	0	4	7	-71

Bolivia	29–70	Brazil

Bolivia	39–54	Chile

Bolivia	34–44	Ecuador

Bolivia	56–61	Peru

Brazil	68–62	Chile

Brazil	59–39	Ecuador

Brazil	70–38	Peru

Chile	55–32	Ecuador

Ecuador	52–40	Peru

Chile	52–25	Peru
