= 1965 South American Basketball Championship for Women =

10th South American Women's Basketball Championship

Tournament details
- Host country: Brazil
- Dates: September 2–11
- Teams: 7
- Venue: 1 (in 1 host city)

Final positions
- Champions: Brazil (3rd title)

The 1965 South American Basketball Championship for Women was the 10th regional tournament for women in South America. It was held in Rio de Janeiro, Brazil and won by the local squad. Seven teams competed.

== Results ==
To define the final standings, each team played the other teams once in a round robin.

Rank	Team	W	L	Pts	Diff
1	Brazil	5	0	10	+181
2	Paraguay	4	1	9	+7
3	Peru	3	2	8	-30
4	Argentina	2	3	7	-9
5	Chile	1	4	6	-61
6	Ecuador	0	5	5	-88
