= 1956 South American Basketball Championship for Women =

6th South American Women's Basketball Championship

Tournament details
- Host country: Ecuador
- Dates: August 4-21
- Teams: 7
- Venue: 1 (in 1 host city)

Final positions
- Champions: Chile (3rd title)

The 1956 South American Basketball Championship for Women was the 6th regional tournament for women in South America. It was held in Quito, Ecuador and won by Chile. Seven teams competed.

== Final rankings ==
1. Chile
2. Paraguay
3. Brazil
4. Argentina
5. Ecuador
6. Peru
7. Colombia

== Results ==
Each team played the other teams once, for a total of four games played by each team.

Rank	Team	W	L	Pts	Diff
1	Chile	6	0	12	+86
2	Paraguay	4	2	10	+95
3	Brazil	4	2	10	+64
4	Argentina	4	2	10	+43
5	Ecuador	2	4	8	-63
6	Peru	1	5	7	-53
7	Colombia	0	6	6	-172

Brazil	54–36	Peru

Argentina	60–27	Colombia

Paraguay	39–43	Chile

Brazil	48–45	Paraguay

Ecuador	40–30	Colombia

Argentina	46–38	Peru

Brazil	42–53	Chile

Chile	63–23	Ecuador

Paraguay	61–51	Argentina

Ecuador	50–44	Peru

Chile	54–33	Peru

Ecuador	40–61	Paraguay

Brazil	75–26	Colombia

Ecuador	33–48	Argentina

Peru	55–59	Paraguay

Chile	44–36	Argentina

Colombia	45–49	Peru

Ecuador	37–78	Brazil

Paraguay	74–38	Colombia

Brazil	57–62	Argentina

Ecuador	32–34	Chile
