= 1968 South American Basketball Championship for Women =

12th South American Women's Basketball Championship

Tournament details
- Host country: Chile
- Dates: November 18 – 28
- Teams: 6
- Venue: 1 (in 1 host city)

Final positions
- Champions: Brazil (5th title)

The 1968 South American Basketball Championship for Women was the 12th instance of the tournament. The host city was Santiago in Chile. The winners were Brazil, who won their fifth title to date and third consecutive title.

== Tournament ==
The tournament was held in a single round robin format among the six competing teams. Brazil won all five of their games. The only change in teams from the previous iteration of the tournament was the loss of the Colombian team, who made their return to the tournament in 1970.

=== Results ===
Pos	Team	Pld	W	L	GF	GA	GD	Pts
1	Brazil	5	5	0	364	269	+95	10
2	Chile	5	4	1	310	251	+59	9
3	Argentina	5	3	2	264	295	−31	8
4	Ecuador	5	2	3	291	331	−40	7
5	Peru	5	1	4	271	298	−27	6
6	Paraguay	5	0	5	298	354	−56	5

Updated to match(es) played on November 28, 1968. Source: "archive.fiba.com: 1968 South American Championship for Women". Archived from the original on September 28, 2015.

=== Games ===
Brazil	72–61	Ecuador

Brazil	76–45	Argentina

Brazil	89–65	Paraguay

Brazil	60–47	Peru

Brazil	67–51	Chile

Chile	68–49	Ecuador

Chile	66–39	Argentina

Chile	52–47	Peru

Chile	73–49	Paraguay

Argentina	53–47	Peru

Argentina	60–42	Ecuador

Argentina	67–64	Paraguay

Ecuador	75–69	Peru

Ecuador	64–62	Paraguay

Peru	61–58	Paraguay
