= 1967 South American Basketball Championship for Women =

11th South American Women's Basketball Championship

Tournament details
- Host country: Colombia
- Dates: October 26 – November 7
- Teams: 7
- Venue: 1 (in 1 host city)

Final positions
- Champions: Brazil (4th title)

The 1967 South American Basketball Championship for Women was the 11th instance of the tournament. The host city was Cali, Colombia. The winners were Brazil, who won their fourth title to date and second consecutive title.

== Tournament ==
The tournament was held in a single round robin format among the seven competing teams. Brazil won all six of their games.

=== Results ===
Pos	Team	Pld	W	L	GF	GA	GD	Pts
1	Brazil	6	6	0	435	244	+191	12
2	Chile	6	5	1	355	283	+72	11
3	Peru	6	4	2	335	329	+6	10
4	Paraguay	6	3	3	352	335	+17	9
5	Argentina	6	2	4	305	367	−62	8
6	Colombia	6	1	5	297	407	−110	7
7	Ecuador	6	0	6	254	368	−114	6

Updated to match(es) played on November 7, 1967. Source: "archive.fiba.com: 1967 South American Championship for Women". Archived from the original on November 3, 2015.

=== Games ===
Peru	57–47	Argentina

Brazil	65–40	Chile

Colombia	56–54	Ecuador

Peru	48–33	Ecuador

Paraguay	73–46	Argentina

Brazil	62–42	Argentina

Chile	56–42	Colombia

Paraguay	72–40	Ecuador

Chile	55–47	Peru

Brazil	73–41	Ecuador

Argentina	78–67	Colombia

Chile	67–41	Paraguay

Brazil	90–38	Colombia

Argentina	48–42	Ecuador

Peru	70–67	Paraguay

Chile	71–44	Ecuador

Paraguay	63–40	Colombia

Chile	66–44	Argentina

Brazil	73–47	Peru

Peru	66–54	Colombia

Brazil	72–36	Paraguay
