= 1962 South American Basketball Championship for Women =

9th South American Women's Basketball Championship

Tournament details
- Host country: Paraguay
- Dates: April 23–May 8
- Teams: 7
- Venue: 1 (in 1 host city)

Final positions
- Champions: Paraguay (2nd title)

The 1962 South American Basketball Championship for Women was the 9th regional tournament for women in South America. It was held in Asunción, Paraguay and won by the hosts. Seven teams competed.

== Results ==
To define the final standings, each team played the other teams once in a round robin.

Rank	Team	W	L	Pts	Diff
1	Paraguay	6	0	12	+142
2	Chile	5	1	11	+104
3	Brazil	4	2	10	+115
4	Argentina	3	3	9	-30
5	Peru	2	4	8	+7
6	Ecuador	1	5	7	-150
7	Uruguay	0	6	6	-188

Brazil	61–42	Ecuador

Argentina	49–45	Ecuador

Chile	61–18	Paraguay

Argentina	50–49	Peru

Paraguay	85–36	Ecuador

Peru	57–40	Uruguay

Chile	71–30	Ecuador

Brazil	47–41	Argentina

Paraguay	75–29	Uruguay

Ecuador	51–34	Uruguay

Paraguay	64–49	Argentina

Chile	55–49	Peru

Brazil	71–32	Ecuador

Paraguay	61–43	Peru

Brazil	81–21	Uruguay

Chile	48–29	Argentina

Paraguay	71–58	Chile

Ecuador	25–59	Peru

Brazil	35–43	Chile

Argentina	35–30	Uruguay

Paraguay	53–52	Brazil
