= 1960 South American Basketball Championship for Women =

8th South American Women's Basketball Championship

Tournament details
- Host country: Chile
- Dates: November 19-December 5
- Teams: 5
- Venue: 1 (in 1 host city)

Final positions
- Champions: Chile (4th title)

The 1960 South American Basketball Championship for Women was the 8th regional tournament for women in South America. It was held in Santiago, Chile and won by the local squad. Five teams competed.

== Final rankings ==
1. Chile
2. Brazil
3. Paraguay
4. Peru
5. Argentina

== Results ==
Each team played the other teams twice, for a total of eight games played by each team.

Rank	Team	W	L	Pts	Diff
1	Chile	6	2	14	+77
2	Brazil	5	3	13	+6
3	Paraguay	4	4	12	-9
4	Peru	3	5	11	+5
5	Argentina	2	6	10	-79

Paraguay	60–51	Argentina

Chile	61–38	Peru

Brazil	64–37	Peru

Chile	60–41	Argentina

Argentina	35–34	Peru

Brazil	62–59	Paraguay

Brazil	68–27	Argentina

Chile	58–50	Paraguay

Brazil	45–75	Chile

Paraguay	58–50	Peru

Argentina	39–45	Paraguay

Peru	54–35	Chile

Peru	73–29	Brazil

Argentina	59–56	Chile

Peru	39–37	Argentina

Paraguay	59–67	Brazil

Argentina	51–57	Brazil

Paraguay	47–61	Chile

Peru	53–54	Paraguay

Chile	51–46	Brazil
