= 1950 South American Basketball Championship for Women =

3rd South American Women's Basketball Championship

Tournament details
- Host country: Peru
- Dates: 1-18 April
- Teams: 6
- Venue: 1 (in 1 host city)

Final positions
- Champions: Chile (2nd title)

The 1950 South American Basketball Championship for Women was the 3rd edition of this regional tournament for women in South America. It was held in Lima, Peru and won by Chile. Six teams competed.

== Final rankings ==
1. Chile
2. Argentina
3. Peru
4. Brazil
5. Bolivia
6. Colombia

== Results ==
Each team played the other teams once, for a total of five games played by each team.

Rank	Team	W	L	PF	PA	Diff
1	Chile	4	1	177	114	+63
2	Argentina	4	1	161	112	+49
3	Peru	3	2	130	104	+26
4	Brazil	2	3	137	127	+10
5	Bolivia	2	3	114	154	-40
6	Colombia	0	5	86	194	-108

Chile	37–30	Argentina

Chile	24–17	Peru

Chile	34–24	Brazil

Peru	23–37	Argentina

Chile	32–33	Bolivia

Chile	50–10	Colombia

Argentina	23–16	Peru

Argentina	35–23	Brazil

Argentina	45–16	Bolivia

Argentina	28–20	Colombia

Peru	25–24	Brazil

Peru	32–17	Bolivia

Peru	40–16	Colombia

Brazil	26–12	Bolivia

Brazil	40–21	Colombia

Bolivia	36–19	Colombia

== Tiebreaker ==
In this case, to break the tie for the first place, a final match was scheduled between Chile and Argentina.

Chile	20–17	Argentina
