= 1958 South American Basketball Championship for Women =

7th South American Women's Basketball Championship

Tournament details
- Host country: Peru
- Dates: April 19-May 8
- Teams: 5
- Venue: 1 (in 1 host city)

Final positions
- Champions: Brazil (2nd title)

The 1958 South American Basketball Championship for Women was the 7th regional tournament for women in South America. It was held in Lima, Peru and won by Brazil. Five teams competed.

== Final rankings ==
1. Brazil
2. Argentina
3. Paraguay
4. Peru
5. Chile

== Results ==
Each team played the other teams twice, for a total of eight games played by each team.

Rank	Team	W	L	Pts	Diff
1	Brazil	8	0	16	+101
2	Argentina	4	4	12	+4
3	Paraguay	4	4	12	-23
4	Chile	2	6	10	-25
5	Peru	2	6	10	-57

Argentina	45–37	Paraguay

Peru	42–29	Chile

Brazil	51–49	Chile

Argentina	46–44	Peru

Argentina	53–43	Chile

Brazil	62–60	Paraguay

Brazil	47–34	Argentina

Paraguay	59–31	Peru

Brazil	59–37	Peru

Chile	42–35	Paraguay

Paraguay	50–44	Argentina

Chile	42–34	Peru

Chile	49–61	Brazil

Peru	49–41	Argentina

Chile	41–42	Argentina

Paraguay	43–63	Brazil

Argentina	48–65	Brazil

Peru	46–51	Paraguay

Paraguay	38–36	Chile

Peru	50–63	Brazil
