= 1952 South American Basketball Championship for Women =

4th South American Women's Basketball Championship

Tournament details
- Host country: Paraguay
- Dates: April 14 - 28
- Teams: 6
- Venue: 1 (in 1 host city)

Final positions
- Champions: Paraguay (1st title)

The 1952 South American Basketball Championship for Women was the 4th regional tournament for women in South America. It was held in Asunción, Paraguay and won by the local squad. Six teams competed.

== Final rankings ==
1. Paraguay
2. Brazil
3. Chile
4. Argentina
5. Peru
6. Bolivia

== Results ==
Each team played the other teams once, for a total of five games played by each team.

Rank	Team	W	L	Pts	Diff
1	Paraguay	5	0	10	+23
2	Brazil	3	2	8	+8
3	Chile	3	2	8	+5
4	Argentina	2	3	7	+21
5	Peru	2	3	7	-20
6	Bolivia	0	5	5	-37

Argentina	39–24	Bolivia

Argentina	21–26	Brazil

Argentina	24–26	Chile

Argentina	21–24	Paraguay

Argentina	37–21	Peru

Bolivia	19–28	Brazil

Bolivia	26–32	Peru

Bolivia	20–24	Paraguay

Bolivia	17–20	Peru

Brazil	34–31	Chile

Brazil	19–20	Paraguay

Brazil	23–31	Peru

Chile	25–32	Paraguay

Chile	36–29	Peru

Paraguay	33–25	Peru
