= 1948 South American Basketball Championship for Women =

2nd South American Women's Basketball Championship

Tournament details
- Host country: Argentina
- Dates: 10-22 May
- Teams: 3
- Venue: 1 (in 1 host city)

Final positions
- Champions: Argentina (1st title)

The 1948 South American Basketball Championship for Women was the 2nd regional tournament for women in South America. It was held in Buenos Aires, Argentina and won by Argentina. Three teams competed.

== Final rankings ==
1. Argentina
2. Chile
3. Peru

== Results ==
Each team played the other teams twice, for a total of four games played by each team.

Rank	Team	W	L	PF	PA	Diff
1	Argentina	4	0	141	98	+43
2	Chile	2	2	136	115	+21
3	Peru	0	4	78	142	-64

Argentina	32–12	Peru

Argentina	34–31	Chile

Peru	24–32	Chile

Peru	23–37	Argentina

Chile	32–38	Argentina

Chile	41–19	Peru
