= 1946 South American Basketball Championship for Women =

1st South American Women's Basketball Championship

Tournament details
- Host country: Chile
- Dates: 10-22 May
- Teams: 4
- Venue: 1 (in 1 host city)

Final positions
- Champions: Chile (1st title)

The 1946 South American Basketball Championship for Women was the first edition and first regional tournament for women in South America. It was held in Santiago, Chile and won by Chile. Four teams competed.

== Final rankings ==
1. Chile
2. Brazil
3. Argentina
4. Bolivia

== Results ==
Each team played the other teams once, for a total of three games played by each team. The top three teams received medals.

Rank	Team	W	L	PF	PA	Diff
1	Chile	3	0	162	100	+62
2	Brazil	2	1	113	91	+22
3	Argentina	1	2	78	117	-39
3	Bolivia	0	3	87	132	-45

Chile	46–34	Brazil

Chile	54–28	Argentina

Chile	62–38	Bolivia

Brazil	37–22	Argentina

Brazil	42–23	Bolivia

Argentina	28–26	Bolivia
