= Anisleidy Galindo =

Cuban basketball player

Pinar del Río
- Position: Guard
- League: LSB

Personal information
- Born: September 21, 1989 (age 37)
- Listed height: 5 ft 11 in (1.80 m)
Medals
Women's basketball
Representing Cuba
Pan American Games
Bronze medal – third place	2015 Toronto	Team

Anisleidy Galindo (born 21 September 1989) is a Cuban basketball player for Pinar del Río and the Cuban national team, where she participated at the 2014 FIBA World Championship.

She was a member of the team which competed for Cuba at the 2015 Pan American Games, winning a bronze medal.
