= Clarissa dos Santos =

Brazilian basketball player (born 1988)

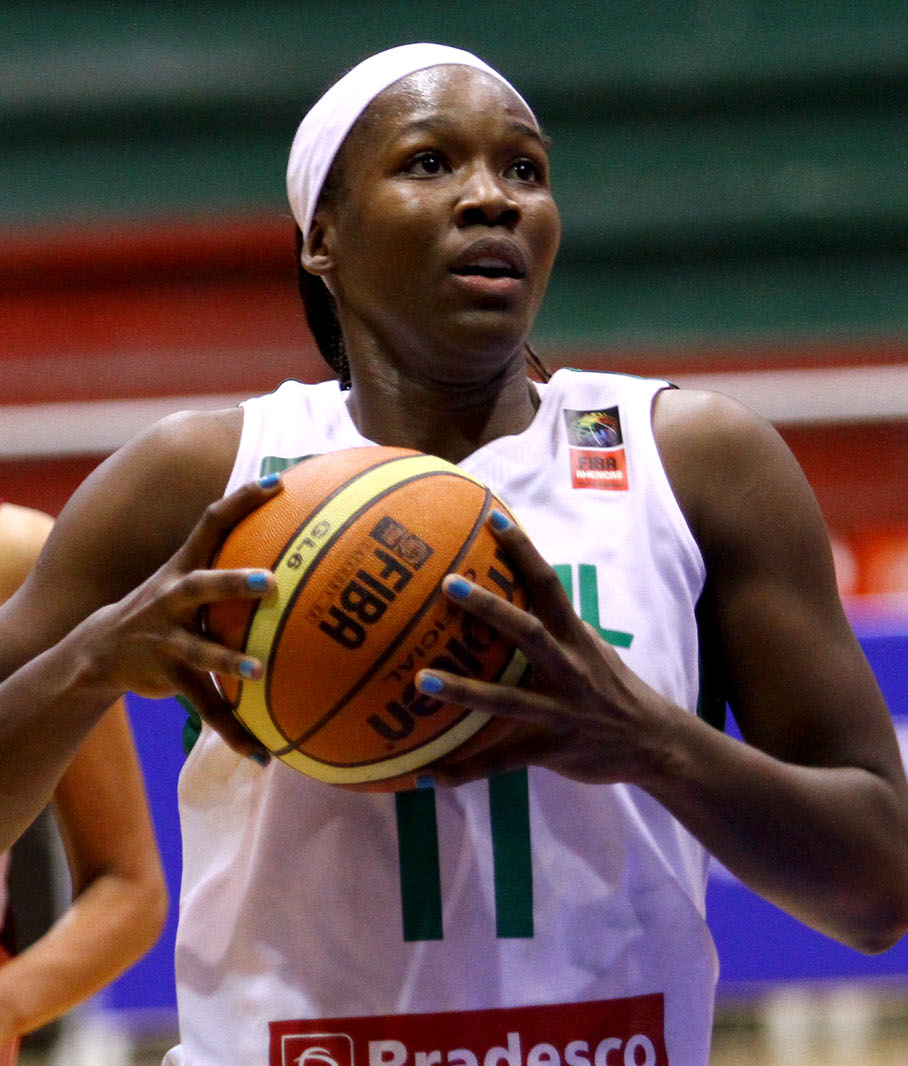
- 2014

Personal information
- Born: 10 March 1988 (age 38) Rio de Janeiro, Brazil
- Listed height: 6 ft 1 in (1.85 m)
- Listed weight: 196 lb (89 kg)

Career information
- Playing career: 2011–present
- Position: Center

Career history
- 2011–2015: ADCF Unide Americana
- 2015–2016: Chicago Sky
- Stats at WNBA.com
- Stats at Basketball Reference
Medals
Women's basketball
Representing Brazil
Pan American Games
Gold medal – first place	2019 Lima	Team
Bronze medal – third place	2011 Guadalajara	Team
FIBA AmeriCup
Gold medal – first place	2011 Valdivia
Bronze medal – third place	2013 Xalapa
Bronze medal – third place	2021 San Juan
South American Championship
Gold medal – first place	2013 Mendoza
Gold medal – first place	2014 Ambato

Clarissa Cristina dos Santos (born 10 March 1988) is a Brazilian professional basketball player who previously played for the Chicago Sky of the Women's National Basketball Association (WNBA). Most recently she has played for Basket Landes in the Euroleague Women.

== Early life and career ==
She began playing sports at 13 on the Miécimo da Silva Sports Complex, and one day, as the basketball court was right along the athletics field where she practiced discus throw. Santos was invited to play basketball, and eventually it became her priority. In 2005, she joined the young teams of the club, and one year later was already in the adult team of Fluminense.

== Player profile ==
Dos Santos excelled at rebounds, a statistic she topped in the Brazilian championship for two straight years. She was champion in 2012 with the Americana team.

== International career ==
For the Brazil women's national basketball team, dos Santos won a bronze medal at the 2011 Pan American Games, and was champion of the 2011 FIBA Americas Championship for Women which qualified Brazil for the 2012 Summer Olympics.

In the women's event, Brazil fell at the group stage with only one win, with Santos leading the rebounds statistic.

She was also part of the Brazilian team that played at the Rio Olympics.

== Career statistics ==
Legend
GP	Games played	GS	Games started	MPG	Minutes per game	RPG	Rebounds per game
APG	Assists per game	SPG	Steals per game	BPG	Blocks per game	PPG	Points per game
TO	Turnovers per game	FG%	Field-goal percentage	3P%	3-point field-goal percentage	FT%	Free-throw percentage
**Bold**	Career best	°	League leader

=== WNBA ===
==== Regular season ====
WNBA regular season statistics
Year	Team	GP	GS	MPG	FG%	3P%	FT%	RPG	APG	SPG	BPG	TO	PPG
2015	Chicago	**31**	**7**	**17.5**	**.461**	—	.688	**4.6**	**0.7**	**0.6**	**0.6**	1.2	**5.3**
2016	Chicago	20	0	9.4	.339	.000	**.850**	2.2	0.5	0.3	0.2	**0.5**	2.9
**Career**	2 years, 1 team	51	7	14.3	.425	.000	.735	3.7	0.6	0.5	0.4	0.9	4.3

==== Playoffs ====
WNBA playoff statistics
Year	Team	GP	GS	MPG	FG%	3P%	FT%	RPG	APG	SPG	BPG	TO	PPG
2015	Chicago	3	0	7.0	.500	—	.500	2.0	0.3	0.7	**0.7**	**0.7**	2.0
2016	Chicago	**5**	0	**18.4**	**.543**	—	**.818**	**3.4**	**1.4**	**1.8**	0.0	1.6	**9.4**
**Career**	2 years, 1 team	8	0	14.1	.538	—	.647	2.9	1.0	1.4	0.3	1.3	6.6
