= Victoria Llorente =

Argentine basketball player

No. 5 – CB Bembibre
- Position: Power forward
- League: LFB

Personal information
- Born: 5 June 1996 (age 30) Buenos Aires, Argentina
- Listed height: 5 ft 11 in (1.80 m)
- Listed weight: 168 lb (76 kg)

Career information
- WNBA draft: 2018: undrafted
Medals
Women's basketball
Representing Argentina
Pan American Games
Silver medal – second place	2019 Lima	National 3x3 team
South American Championship
Silver medal – second place	2022 Argentina	Team

Victoria Llorente (born 5 June 1996) is an Argentine basketball player for CB Bembibre and the Argentina women's national basketball team.

She defended Argentina at the 2018 FIBA Women's Basketball World Cup.
