= Daniela Wallen =

Venezuelan basketball player

Personal information
- Born: 4 April 1995 (age 31) Venezuela
- Listed height: 180 cm (5 ft 11 in)

Career information
- College: Independence CC (2013–2014); NWFSC (2014–2015); Oklahoma City (2015–2017)
- Playing career: 2017–present
- Position: Small forward / power forward

Career history
- 2017–2018: IK Eos
- 2018: Geelong Supercats
- 2018: Sol de América Asunción
- 2019: Peli-Karhut
- 2019–2024: Keflavík
- 2024: Colegio Los Leones Quilpe
- 2025–2026: Montana 2003

Career highlights
- 2× Úrvalsdeild Foreign Player of the Year (2021, 2023); Úrvalsdeild kvenna champion (2024); Icelandic Cup (2024); Finnish champion (2019); Paraguayan League champion (2018); Paraguayan League Finals MVP (2018); NAIA champion (2017); NAIA Tournament MVP (2017); SAC Player of the Year (2016, 2017); First-team All-SAC (2016, 2017); First-team All-Panhandle Conference (2015); Úrvalsdeild rebounding leader (2021)
Medals
Women's basketball
Representing Venezuela
South American Championship
Bronze medal – third place	2014 Ambato	Team
Silver medal – second place	2016 Barquisimeto	Team

Daniela Wallen Morillo (born 4 April 1995) is a Venezuelan basketball player and a member of the Venezuela national team. She played college basketball for Northwest Florida State College and Oklahoma City University, winning the NAIA championship with the latter in 2017. Following her college career, she has played professionally in three continents. In 2018, she won the Paraguayan League championship with Sol de América Asunción, and the following year she won the Finnish championship as a member of Peli-Karhut. In 2024, she won the Icelandic championship with Keflavík.

== Early life ==
Wallen grew up in Venezuela where she played football in her youth. Her parents where both former basketball players, but she only started playing basketball with a youth team at the age of 15 and the same year she first played for one of Venezuela's youth national teams.

== College career ==
Wallen started her college career with Independence Community College in 2013. After having trouble adjusting to the new settings, mostly due to the language barrier as she spoke no English, Wallen transferred to Northwest Florida State College the following season. During the 2014–2015 season, she was named First-team All-Panhandle Conference after averaging 15.4 points, 8.6 rebounds and 3.79 steals per game. In 2015, she transferred again, this time to Oklahoma City University. During her first year, she averaged 19.6 points, 9.3 rebounds, 3.2 assists and 3.3 steals per game and was named the Sooner Athletic Conference player of the year. The following season, she helped Oklahoma to win the NAIA championship while being named the Tournament MVP.

== Club career ==
Wallen's first professional stop was with IK Eos in the Basketligan dam during the 2017–2018 season where she averaged 16.4 points and 11.8 rebounds per game. In March 2018, she signed with the Geelong Supercats of the Australian SEABL. After the SEABL season, she signed with Sol de América Asunción where she won the Paraguayan League championship with Sol de América Asunción and was named the Finals MVP in December the same year.

In February 2019, Wallen joined Peli-Karhut of the Finnish Naisten Korisliiga. In April, she won the Finnish championship after Peli beat Catz Lappeenranta in the Finals. In 2019, Wallen signed with Keflavík of the Icelandic Úrvalsdeild kvenna. She averaged 24.7 points, 13.1 rebounds and 4.9 assists during the 2019–20 season with Keflavík in the third place when the rest of the season was canceled due to the coronavirus pandemic in Iceland. She re-signed with Keflavík and had a stand-out second season, averaging 25.6 points and league leading 17.0 rebounds per game and was named the Úrvalsdeild Foreign Player of the Year.

In 2023, she was again named the Úrvalsdeild Foreign Player of the Year after leading Keflavík to the Úrvalsdeild finals and averaging 20.4 points, 11.7 rebounds and 4.6 assists during the regular seasons and playoffs.

In 2024, she won the national championship with Keflavík.

In September 2024, Wallen signed with Colegio Los Leones Quilpe in Chile where she averaged 18.3 points and 12.9 rebounds per game and helped the team reach the Chilean league finals. Following the season, she signed with Montana 2003 in Bulgaria.
