= Uruguay women's national basketball team =

Uruguay
- FIBA ranking: 84 ▲13 (14 September 2026)
- Joined FIBA: 1936
- FIBA zone: FIBA Americas
- Coach: Alejandro Alvarez

Olympic Games
- Appearances: None

World Cup
- Appearances: None

FIBA Women's AmeriCup
- Appearances: None
Home	Away

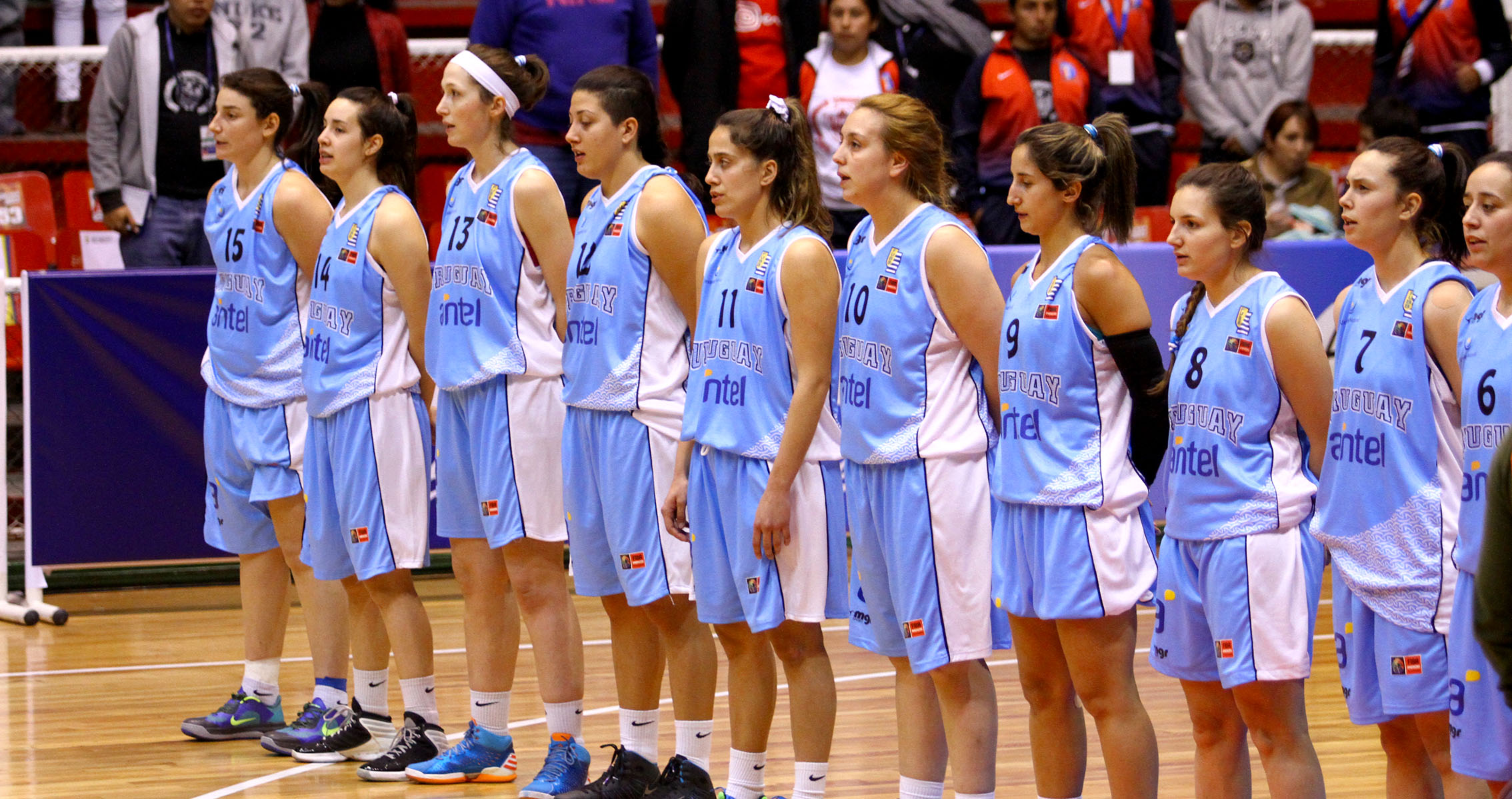
The Uruguay team in the South American Women's Basketball Championship Ambato 2014

The Uruguay women's national basketball team is administered by the Federación Uruguaya de Básquetbol - "FUBB".

It competes at the South American Basketball Championship for Women.

== See also ==
- Uruguay women's national under-17 basketball team
- Uruguay women's national under-15 basketball team
- Uruguay women's national 3x3 team
