= Debora González =

Argentine basketball player

No. 13 – Dike Basket Napoli
- Position: Point guard
- League: A1

Personal information
- Born: 10 January 1990 (age 35); Lomas de Zamora, Argentina
- Listed height: 5 ft 7 in (1.70 m)
- Listed weight: 128 lb (58 kg)

Career information
- WNBA draft: 2012: undrafted

Debora Sabrina González (born 10 January 1990) is an Argentine basketball player for Dike Basket Napoli and the Argentina women's national basketball team.

She defended Argentina at the 2018 FIBA Women's Basketball World Cup.
