= Andrea Boquete =

Argentine basketball player (born 1990)

No. 8 – Obras Basket
- Position: Small forward
- League: LNB

Personal information
- Born: 24 September 1990 (age 36) Mendoza, Argentina
- Listed height: 6 ft 0 in (1.83 m)
- Listed weight: 165 lb (75 kg)

Career information
- WNBA draft: 2012: undrafted
Medals
Women's basketball
Representing Argentina
Pan American Games
| Silver medal – second place | 2019 Lima | National 3x3 team |

Andrea Boquete (born 24 September 1990) is an Argentine basketball player for Obras Basket and the Argentina women's national basketball team. She is playing (season 22-23) for Universitario Baxi Ferrol in the Spanish Challenge League.

She defended Argentina at the 2018 FIBA Women's Basketball World Cup.
