= Melisa Gretter =

Argentine basketball player

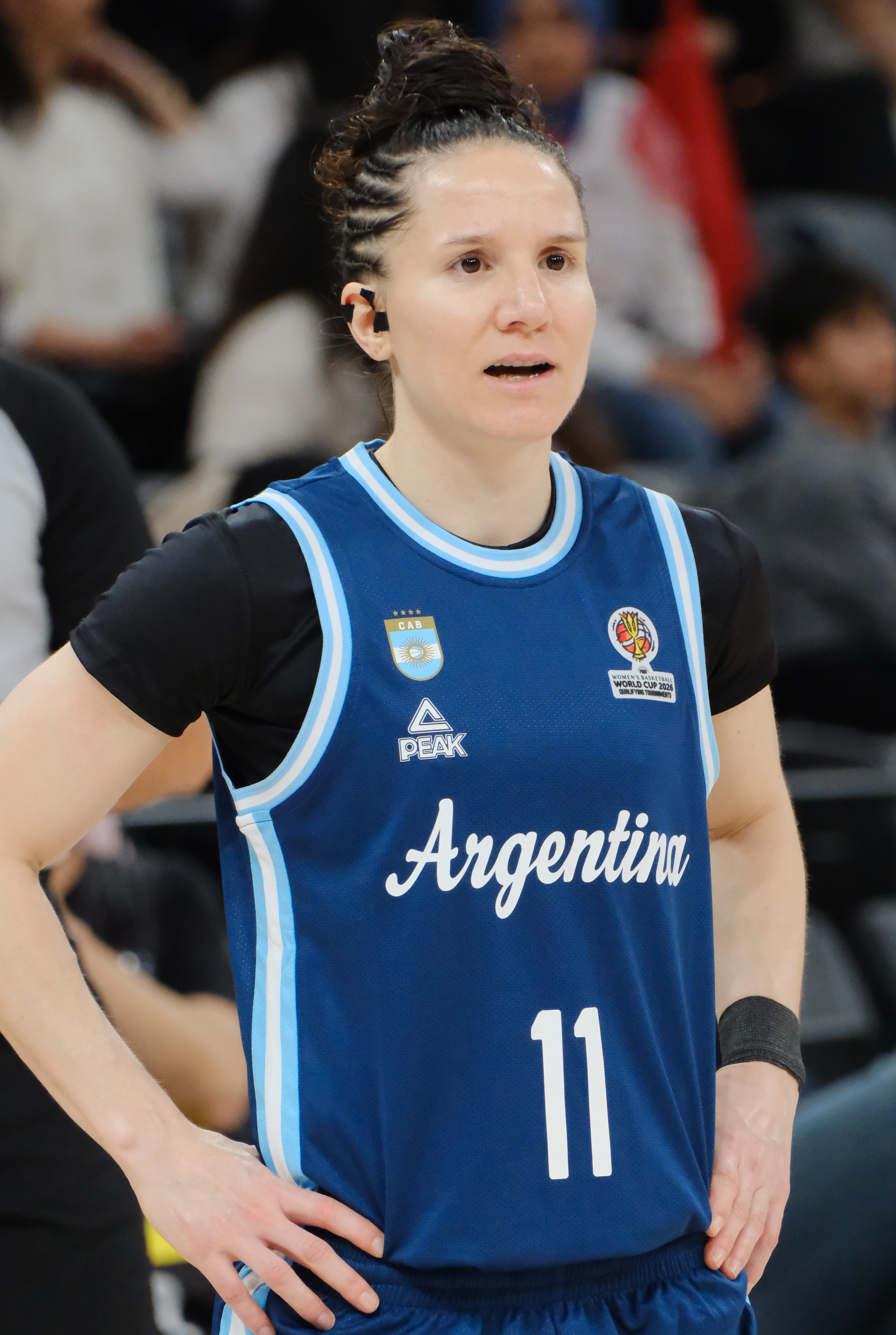

No. 11 – Campinas Basquete Clube
- Position: Point guard
- League: NBB

Personal information
- Born: 24 January 1993 (age 33) Santa Fe, Argentina
- Listed height: 5 ft 6 in (1.68 m)
- Listed weight: 121 lb (55 kg)

Career information
- WNBA draft: 2015: undrafted
Medals
Women's basketball
Representing Argentina
FIBA Women's AmeriCup
Silver medal – second place	2017 Argentina	Team
Silver medal – second place	2011 Colombia	Team
Bronze medal – third place	2015 Canada	Team
Pan American Games
Silver medal – second place	2019 Lima	National 3x3 team
South American Championship
Gold medal – first place	2026 Argentina	Team
Gold medal – first place	2024 Chile	Team
Gold medal – first place	2018 Colombia	Team
Silver medal – second place	2022 Argentina	Team
Silver medal – second place	2014 Ecuador	Team
Silver medal – second place	2013 Argentina	Team

Melisa Paola Gretter (born 24 January 1993) is an Argentine basketball player for Campinas Basquete Clube and the Argentina women's national basketball team.

She defended Argentina at the 2018 FIBA Women's Basketball World Cup.
