= Venezuela women's national basketball team =

Venezuela
- FIBA ranking: 49 ▼3 (18 March 2026)
- Joined FIBA: 1938
- FIBA zone: FIBA Americas
- Coach: Luz Marina Vargas

FIBA AmeriCup
- Appearances: 7
Home	Away

The Venezuela women's national basketball team is administered by the Federación Venezolana de Baloncesto.

== FIBA Americas Championship record ==
- 1999 – 8th place
- 2009 – 7th place
- 2013 – 8th place
- 2015 – 5th place
- 2017 – 9th place
- 2021 – 6th place
- 2023 – 6th place
- 2027 – Qualified

== Current roster ==
Roster for the 2023 FIBA Women's AmeriCup.

Venezuela women's national basketball team roster
Players
Coaches

Pos.	No.	Name	Age – Date of birth	Height	Club	Ctr.
SF	2	Genesis Rivera	27 – 6 February 1996	1.78 m (5 ft 10 in)	Club Atlético Aguada	(Uruguay)
PG	3	Barbara Pico	21 – 20 January 2002	1.72 m (5 ft 8 in)	Pastoras de Lara	(Venezuela)
SF	6	Yosimar Corrales	33 – 5 February 1990	1.81 m (5 ft 11 in)	Cayenas de Carabobo	(Venezuela)
G	7	Guadalupe Díaz	23 – 7 December 1999	1.68 m (5 ft 6 in)	Taurinas de Girardot	(Colombia)
SF	8	Ivaney Marquez	40 – 17 March 1983	1.81 m (5 ft 11 in)	Cayenas de Carabobo	(Venezuela)
SF	9	Daniela Wallen	28 – 4 April 1995	1.79 m (5 ft 10 in)	Keflavík	(Iceland)
PG	11	Mariana Durán	30 – 12 May 1993	1.72 m (5 ft 8 in)	Basket 2000	(Italy)
SG	13	Jormelys Urbina	26 – 9 July 1996	1.71 m (5 ft 7 in)	Caribeñas de Caracas	(Venezuela)
PG	14	Waleska Pérez	29 – 17 February 1994	1.81 m (5 ft 11 in)	Abejas de León Femenil	(Mexico)
PF	19	Leudys Quevedo	24 – 3 July 1998	1.83 m (6 ft 0 in)	Cayenas de Carabobo	(Venezuela)
C	22	Aguehil Fajardo	23 – 6 October 1999	1.84 m (6 ft 0 in)	Esgueira Basket	(Portugal)
C	25	Yolimar Martínez	28 – 30 January 1995	1.84 m (6 ft 0 in)	Capitalinas Distrito Capital	(Venezuela)

Head coach

- (Venezuela) Eduardo Pinto

Assistant coach(es)

- (Venezuela) José Gallardo
- (Venezuela) Luz Vargas

Legend

- Club – describes last
  club before the tournament
- Age – describes age
  on 1 July 2023

== See also ==
- Venezuela women's national under-15 and under-16 basketball team
- Venezuela women's national under-17 and under-18 basketball team
- Venezuela women's national 3x3 team
