= Bolivia women's national basketball team =

Bolivia
- FIBA ranking: 92 (18 March 2026)
- Joined FIBA: 1947
- FIBA zone: FIBA Americas
- National federation: Federación Boliviana de Básquetbol (FBB)

Olympic Games
- Appearances: None
- Medals: None

World Cup
- Appearances: 1
- Medals: None

FIBA Americas Championship for Women
- Medals: 1 (1978)
Home	Away

The Bolivia women's national basketball team represents the Bolivia in international competitions. It is administered by the Federación Boliviana de Básquetbol (FBB).

They won the silver medal at the 1978 South American Basketball Championship for Women.

== See also ==
- Bolivia women's national under-19 basketball team
- Bolivia women's national under-17 basketball team
- Bolivia women's national 3x3 team
- Bolivia men's national basketball team
