= Ecuador women's national basketball team =

Ecuador
- FIBA ranking: 86 (18 March 2026)
- FIBA zone: FIBA Americas
- National federation: Federación Ecuatoriana de Basquetbol

Americas Championship
- Appearances: 1 (2015)

South American Championship
- Medals: Bronze: 1954, 1970
Home	Away

The Ecuador women's national basketball team is the official women's basketball team for Ecuador.

== Current roster ==
The following 12 players were called up to the squad for the 2024 South American Basketball Championship for Women. Source: FIBA official website

Ecuador women's national basketball team roster
Players
Coaches

Pos.	No.	Name	Age – Date of birth	Height	Club	Ctr.
PG	0	Karima Valencia	21 – 6 May 2003	1.72 m (5 ft 8 in)	Ambato Soldiers	(Ecuador)
PF	1	Karla Naranjo	34 – 16 December 1989	1.75 m (5 ft 9 in)	Ambato Soldiers	(Ecuador)
SF	5	Marjorie Caicedo	34 – 7 May 1990	1.80 m (5 ft 11 in)	Ambato Soldiers	(Ecuador)
PG	7	Erika Calderón	32 – 15 October 1991	1.70 m (5 ft 7 in)	Floresta Guayas Basket Club	(Ecuador)
SF	9	Dayanna Salcedo	34 – 13 October 1989	1.79 m (5 ft 10 in)	Societá Sportiva Bocca	(Ecuador)
G	10	Heidy Guayaquil	25 – 7 August 1999	1.68 m (5 ft 6 in)	Unión Deportiva Juvenil	(Ecuador)
PG	11	Fatima Corozo	17 – 12 September 2006	1.62 m (5 ft 4 in)	Ambato Soldiers	(Ecuador)
C	12	Nahomy Nazareno	17 – 17 January 2007	1.85 m (6 ft 1 in)	Free agent
C	13	Maria Ordoñez	18 – 23 February 2006	1.81 m (5 ft 11 in)	Free agent
PG	17	Doris Lasso	31 – 13 June 1993	1.65 m (5 ft 5 in)	Ambato Soldiers	(Ecuador)
SF	18	Noelia Moran	22 – 18 July 2002	1.80 m (5 ft 11 in)	Ambato Soldiers	(Ecuador)
PF	55	Ana Mora	25 – 7 July 1999	1.76 m (5 ft 9 in)	Unión Deportiva Juvenil	(Ecuador)

Head coach

- (Ecuador) Pablo Zeballos

Assistant coaches

- (Ecuador) Javier Ortega
- (Ecuador) Luciano Martínez

Legend

- Club – describes last
  club before the tournament
- Age – describes age
  on 7 September 2024
