= Paraguay women's national basketball team =

Paraguay
- FIBA ranking: 75 ▼2 (18 March 2026)
- Joined FIBA: 1947
- FIBA zone: FIBA Americas
- National federation: Paraguayan Basketball Federation
- Coach: Juan Pablo Feliu

Olympic Games
- Appearances: None

World Cup
- Appearances: 3
- Medals: None

FIBA Women's AmeriCup
- Appearances: 3
- Medals: None

Pan American Games
- Appearances: 1
- Medals: None
Home	Away

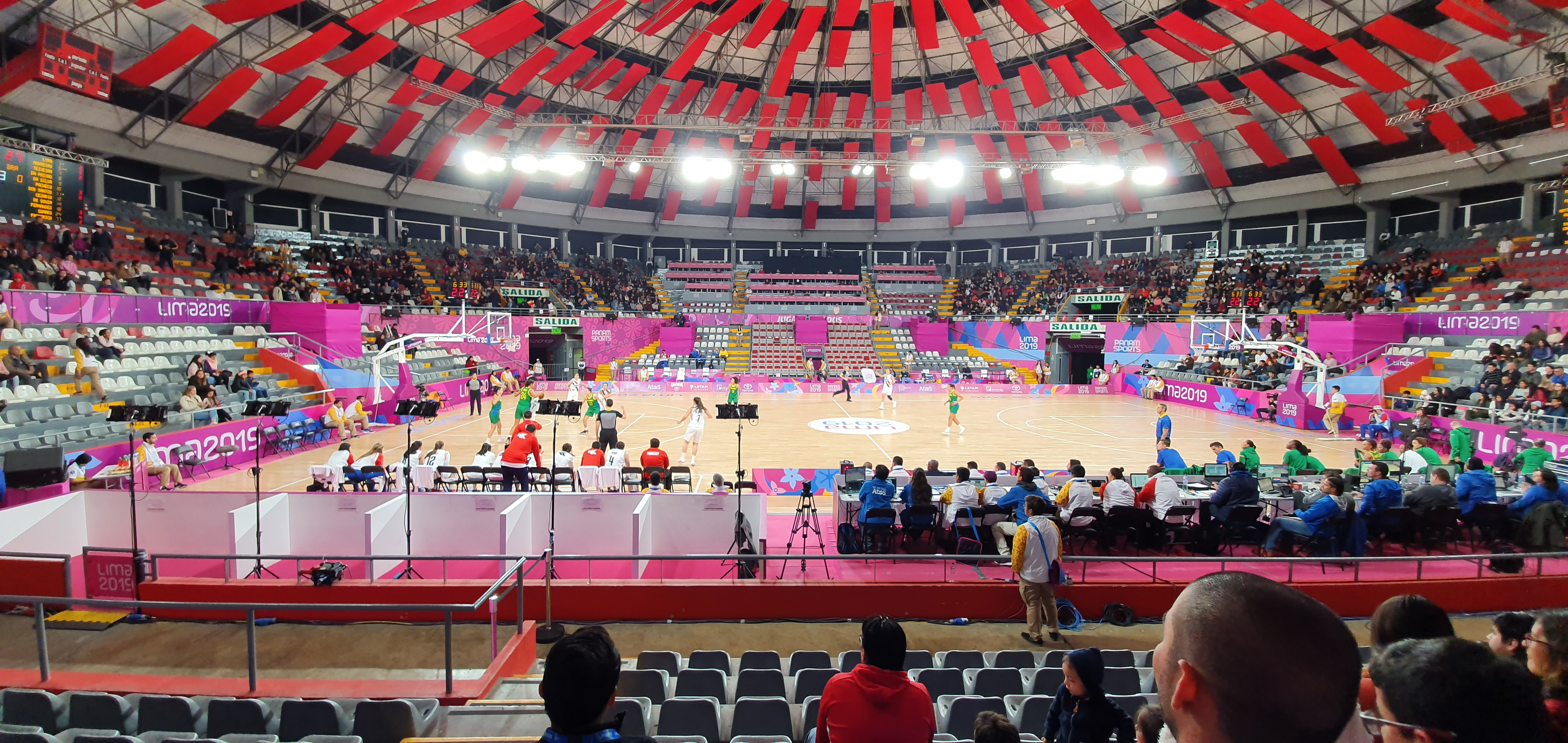
2019 Pan American Games women's basketball match between Brazil and Paraguay teams in the Coliseo Eduardo Dibós arena of Lima, Peru.

The Paraguay women's national basketball team is the team governed by the Paraguayan Basketball Federation that represents Paraguay in the international women's basketball competitions organized by the International Basketball Federation (FIBA) and the International Olympic Committee (IOC).

The best achievements by the Paraguay women's national basketball team are the two first-places finishes in the FIBA South America Championship for Women, in 1952 and 1962.

== Competitions ==
=== FIBA World Championship ===
- 1953: 5th
- 1957: 6th
- 1964: 12th

=== FIBA Americas Championship ===
- 2011: 9th
- 2017: 6th
- 2019: 10th

=== Pan American Games ===
- 2031: Qualified as host

== See also ==
- Paraguay women's national under-19 basketball team
- Paraguay women's national under-17 basketball team
- Paraguay women's national 3x3 team
