= Peru women's national basketball team =

Peru
- FIBA ranking: NR (18 March 2026)
- Joined FIBA: 1936
- FIBA zone: FIBA Americas
- Coach: Diego Martinez

Olympic Games
- Appearances: None

World Cup
- Appearances: 4
- Medals: None

Americas Championship
- Appearances: 1 (1989)
- Medals: None
| Home | Away |

The Peru women's national basketball team is the official women's basketball team for Peru. It is administered by the Peru Basketball Federation (Spanish: Federación Deportiva Peruana de Basketball) (F.D.P.B.).

== See also ==
- Peru women's national under-17 basketball team
- Peru women's national under-15 basketball team
- Peru women's national 3x3 team
