= 2017 FIBA Women's AmeriCup rosters =

The following is a list of squads for each nation competing at the 2017 FIBA Women's AmeriCup

== Pool A ==
=== Argentina ===
Argentina women's national basketball team roster
Players
Coaches

Pos.	No.	Name	Age – Date of birth	Height	Club	Ctr.
C	3	Mara Marchizotti	23 – 16 June 1994	1.93 m (6 ft 4 in)
SG	4	Macarena Rosset	26 – 23 February 1991	1.76 m (5 ft 9 in)
PG	5	Macarena D'Urso	25 – 16 December 1991	1.62 m (5 ft 4 in)
SF	8	Andrea Boquete	26 – 24 September 1990	1.80 m (5 ft 11 in)
PF	9	Celia Fiorotto	25 – 2 June 1992	1.84 m (6 ft 0 in)
C	10	Agostina Burani	25 – 4 October 1991	1.86 m (6 ft 1 in)
PG	11	Melisa Gretter	24 – 24 January 1993	1.60 m (5 ft 3 in)
PF	12	Ornella Santana	26 – 17 September 1990	1.80 m (5 ft 11 in)
PG	13	Debora González	27 – 10 January 1990	1.65 m (5 ft 5 in)
C	14	Sofia Aispurua	22 – 18 February 1995	1.90 m (6 ft 3 in)
SF	18	Julieta Armesto	23 – 22 April 1994	1.80 m (5 ft 11 in)
SF	22	Natacha Pérez	26 – 30 March 1991	1.81 m (5 ft 11 in)

Head coach

- (Argentina) Christian Santander

Assistant coach(es)

- (Argentina) German Ariel Intonio

Legend

- Club – describes last
  club before the tournament
- Age – describes age
  on 6 August 2017

=== Brazil ===
Brazil women's national basketball team roster
Players
Coaches

Pos.	No.	Name	Age – Date of birth	Height	Club	Ctr.
SF	3	Isabela Macedo	23 – 23 January 1994	1.81 m (5 ft 11 in)
PG	5	Bárbara Honório	32 – 30 July 1985	1.80 m (5 ft 11 in)
G	6	Joice Rodrigues	30 – 6 September 1986	1.76 m (5 ft 9 in)
SG	7	Patrícia Teixeira	26 – 28 September 1990	1.78 m (5 ft 10 in)
SG	9	Jaqueline de Paula	31 – 17 February 1986	1.77 m (5 ft 10 in)
SF	10	Tatiane Pacheco	26 – 16 October 1990	1.81 m (5 ft 11 in)
PF	11	Soeli Garvão Zakrzeski	39 – 12 November 1977	1.88 m (6 ft 2 in)
C	15	Kelly Santos	37 – 10 November 1979	1.92 m (6 ft 4 in)
PF	23	Leticia Rodrigues	22 – 12 March 1995	1.90 m (6 ft 3 in)
G	33	Izabela Nicoletti	17 – 9 August 1999	1.75 m (5 ft 9 in)
PF	34	Gilmara Justino	36 – 13 March 1981	1.85 m (6 ft 1 in)
F	55	Raphaella Monteiro	22 – 28 January 1995	1.81 m (5 ft 11 in)

Head coach

- (Brazil) Carlos Jose Lima

Assistant coach(es)

- (Brazil) Bruno Pimentel Guidorizzi

Legend

- Club – describes last
  club before the tournament
- Age – describes age
  on 6 August 2017

=== Colombia ===
Colombia women's national basketball team roster
Players
Coaches

Pos.	No.	Name	Age – Date of birth	Height	Club	Ctr.
SG	2	María Tapias	22 – 27 May 1995	1.66 m (5 ft 5 in)
C	5	Diana Prens	21 – 6 September 1995	1.90 m (6 ft 3 in)
SF	6	María Delgado	21 – 9 March 1996	1.70 m (5 ft 7 in)
PG	7	Mayra Caicedo	17 – 12 January 2000	1.75 m (5 ft 9 in)
PG	8	Manuela Ríos	20 – 25 January 1997	1.65 m (5 ft 5 in)
PG	9	María Palacio	32 – 30 April 1985	1.68 m (5 ft 6 in)
F	10	Mabel Martínez	30 – 28 October 1986	1.78 m (5 ft 10 in)
PF	11	Marlyn Venté	22 – 28 July 1995	1.85 m (6 ft 1 in)
SG	12	Jenifer Muñoz	26 – 1 February 1991	1.70 m (5 ft 7 in)
C	13	Libia De la Rosa	25 – 16 June 1992	1.87 m (6 ft 2 in)
PF	15	Tathiana Mosquera	27 – 15 December 1989	1.97 m (6 ft 6 in)
SF	16	Luz Asprilla	25 – 5 June 1992	1.83 m (6 ft 0 in)

Head coach

- (Colombia) Luis Miguel Cuenca

Legend

- Club – describes last
  club before the tournament
- Age – describes age
  on 6 August 2017

=== Venezuela ===
Venezuela women's national basketball team roster
Players
Coaches

Pos.	No.	Name	Age – Date of birth	Height	Club	Ctr.
SF	4	Thalia Garcia	22 – 23 November 1994	1.77 m (5 ft 10 in)
SF	6	Yosimar Corrales	27 – 5 February 1990	1.80 m (5 ft 11 in)
SF	8	Ivaney Márquez	34 – 17 March 1983	1.79 m (5 ft 10 in)
SF	9	Daniela Wallen	22 – 4 April 1995	1.77 m (5 ft 10 in)
SG	10	Luisana Ortega	27 – 25 September 1989	1.73 m (5 ft 8 in)
PG	11	Mariana Durán	24 – 12 May 1993	1.68 m (5 ft 6 in)
PF	12	Sharol Renault	30 – 27 September 1986	1.70 m (5 ft 7 in)
PF	13	Marielka Garate	22 – 7 February 1995	1.83 m (6 ft 0 in)
PG	14	Waleska Pérez	23 – 17 February 1994	1.79 m (5 ft 10 in)
C	15	Siuly Marcano	21 – 3 January 1996	1.82 m (6 ft 0 in)
PF	16	Odeth Betancourt	17 – 18 February 2000	1.85 m (6 ft 1 in)

Head coach

- (Venezuela) Oscar Agapito Silva Salas

Assistant coach(es)

- (Venezuela) Brickman Morales

Legend

- Club – describes last
  club before the tournament
- Age – describes age
  on 8 August 2017

=== Virgin Islands ===
Virgin Islands women's national basketball team roster
Players
Coaches

Pos.	No.	Name	Age – Date of birth	Height	Club	Ctr.
G	5	Tanecka Carey	26 – 17 September 1990	1.75 m (5 ft 9 in)
G	6	Kadesha Barry	22 – 26 July 1995	1.70 m (5 ft 7 in)
F	7	Natalie Day	27 – 26 March 1990	1.85 m (6 ft 1 in)
F	8	Raemiesha Claxton	21 – 30 December 1995	1.75 m (5 ft 9 in)
SF	9	Lanese Bough	24 – 12 July 1993	1.73 m (5 ft 8 in)
F	10	Victoria Hamilton	25 – 7 August 1991	1.78 m (5 ft 10 in)
C	11	I'tiana Taylor	24 – 28 June 1993	1.87 m (6 ft 2 in)
G	12	Imani Tate	21 – 7 December 1995	1.75 m (5 ft 9 in)
G	13	Taylor Jones	20 – 12 July 1997	1.72 m (5 ft 8 in)
C	14	Anisha George	19 – 26 May 1998	1.82 m (6 ft 0 in)

Head coach

- (United States Virgin Islands) William J. Colon

Legend

- Club – describes last
  club before the tournament
- Age – describes age
  on 6 August 2017

== Pool B ==
=== Canada ===
Canada women's national basketball team roster
Players
Coaches

Pos.	No.	Name	Age – Date of birth	Height	Club
G	4	Miah-Marie Langlois	25 – 21 September 1991	1.70 m (5 ft 7 in)	WBC Enisey Krasnoyarsk	(Russia)
G	5	Kia Nurse	21 – 22 February 1996	1.82 m (6 ft 0 in)	Connecticut Huskies	(United States)
G	6	Laura Dally	24 – 14 November 1992	1.82 m (6 ft 0 in)	Saskatchewan Huskies	(Canada)
SG	7	Sami Hill	22 – 22 November 1994	1.77 m (5 ft 10 in)	Virginia Tech Hokies	(United States)
G	8	Bridget Carleton	20 – 22 May 1997	1.85 m (6 ft 1 in)	Iowa State Cyclones	(United States)
PF	9	Miranda Ayim	29 – 6 May 1988	1.90 m (6 ft 3 in)	Basket Landes	(France)
G	10	Nirra Fields	23 – 3 December 1993	1.72 m (5 ft 8 in)	UNI Győr	(Hungary)
G	12	Jamie Scott	22 – 9 August 1994	1.77 m (5 ft 10 in)	Star Center-Uni Ferrol	(Spain)
G	13	Shay Colley	21 – 6 January 1996	1.75 m (5 ft 9 in)	Michigan State Spartans	(United States)
F	14	Katherine Plouffe	24 – 15 September 1992	1.90 m (6 ft 3 in)	CJM Bourges Basket	(France)
F	15	Michelle Plouffe	24 – 15 September 1992	1.90 m (6 ft 3 in)	USO Mondeville	(France)
C	22	Ruth Hamblin	23 – 24 June 1994	1.98 m (6 ft 6 in)	Adelaide Lightning	(Australia)

Head coach

- (Canada) Lisa Thomaidis

Assistant coach(es)

- (Canada) Steve Baur
- (Canada) Shawnee Kaye

Legend

- Club – describes last
  club before the tournament
- Age – describes age
  on 6 August 2017

=== Cuba ===
Cuba women's national basketball team roster
Players
Coaches

Pos.	No.	Name	Age – Date of birth	Height	Club
F	4	Fransy Ochoa	26 – 13 September 1990	1.80 m (5 ft 11 in)
G	5	Ineidis Casanova	28 – 13 October 1988	1.70 m (5 ft 7 in)
F	6	Anisleidy Galindo	28 – 29 January 1989	1.80 m (5 ft 11 in)
G	7	Lisdeivy Martinez	28 – 23 September 1988	1.75 m (5 ft 9 in)
G	8	Arlenys Romero	33 – 7 February 1984	1.76 m (5 ft 9 in)
G	9	Elianis Armentero	17 – 2 January 2000	1.75 m (5 ft 9 in)
C	10	Anay Garcia	23 – 27 April 1994	1.90 m (6 ft 3 in)
C	11	Marlen Cepeda	31 – 27 October 1985	1.85 m (6 ft 1 in)
F	12	Yuniesky Bouly	24 – 23 December 1992	1.77 m (5 ft 10 in)
SF	13	Edith Thompson	26 – 11 December 1990	1.82 m (6 ft 0 in)
G	14	Leidys Oquendo	35 – 23 July 1982	1.78 m (5 ft 10 in)
G	15	Dairis Tornell	25 – 18 April 1992	1.72 m (5 ft 8 in)

Head coach

- (Cuba) Alberto Domingo Zabala Forns

Assistant coach(es)

- (Cuba) Eduardo Mario Moya Pardo

Legend

- Club – describes last
  club before the tournament
- Age – describes age
  on 6 August 2017

=== Mexico ===
Mexico women's national basketball team roster
Players
Coaches

Pos.	No.	Name	Age – Date of birth	Height	Club
PG	4	Bianca Torre	26 – 8 November 1990	1.60 m (5 ft 3 in)
C	5	Jacqueline Luna	24 – 22 January 1993	1.88 m (6 ft 2 in)
SF	6	Gladys Ávila	22 – 27 November 1994	1.77 m (5 ft 10 in)
SF	7	Ingrid Martinez	22 – 16 May 1995	1.75 m (5 ft 9 in)
C	8	Claudia Ramos	19 – 27 August 1997	1.80 m (5 ft 11 in)
PG	9	Brisa Silva	33 – 7 March 1984	1.68 m (5 ft 6 in)
PG	10	Carmen Saad	26 – 10 January 1991	1.65 m (5 ft 5 in)
PG	11	Daniela Pardo	23 – 16 July 1994	1.60 m (5 ft 3 in)
PF	12	Laura Nuñez	24 – 4 February 1993	1.87 m (6 ft 2 in)
C	13	Myriam Lara	23 – 22 July 1994	1.86 m (6 ft 1 in)
SF	14	Sandra Vargas	20 – 9 June 1997	1.74 m (5 ft 9 in)
F	15	Maria Orozco	31 – 31 May 1986	1.76 m (5 ft 9 in)

Head coach

- (Mexico) Javier Alonso Ceniceros Gonzalez

Assistant coach(es)

- (Mexico) Hector Manuel Vildosola Gonzalez

Legend

- Club – describes last
  club before the tournament
- Age – describes age
  on 6 August 2017

=== Paraguay ===
Paraguay women's national basketball team roster
Players
Coaches

Pos.	No.	Name	Age – Date of birth	Height	Club	Ctr.
PG	1	Maria Mercado	27 – 26 October 1989	1.65 m (5 ft 5 in)	Club Sol de América	(Paraguay)
SG	3	Marta Peralta	23 – 16 July 1994	1.73 m (5 ft 8 in)	Club Sol de América	(Paraguay)
C	4	Ilda Peña	33 – 9 January 1984	1.80 m (5 ft 11 in)	Club Olimpia	(Paraguay)
SF	5	Paola Ferrari	31 – 16 September 1985	1.78 m (5 ft 10 in)	Mann-Filter Casablanca	(Spain)
F	6	Astrid Hutteman	25 – 4 April 1992	1.78 m (5 ft 10 in)	Club Sol de América	(Paraguay)
SG	7	Claudia Aponte	26 – 17 January 1991	1.72 m (5 ft 8 in)
F	8	Natalia Quevedo	19 – 13 January 1998	1.75 m (5 ft 9 in)	Club Olimpia	(Paraguay)
PG	9	Melina Pérez	28 – 16 January 1989	1.65 m (5 ft 5 in)	Club Olimpia	(Paraguay)
SF	10	Tamara Insfrán	28 – 26 July 1989	1.76 m (5 ft 9 in)	Club Sol de América	(Paraguay)
G	11	María Caraves	25 – 31 May 1992	1.69 m (5 ft 7 in)	Club Sol de América	(Paraguay)
SF	12	Andrea Gómez	27 – 28 January 1990	1.78 m (5 ft 10 in)	Club Sol de América	(Paraguay)
SF	14	Rocio Insfrán	23 – 30 October 1993	1.75 m (5 ft 9 in)	Club Sol de América	(Paraguay)

Head coach

- (Paraguay) Juan Pablo Feliu

Legend

- Club – describes last
  club before the tournament
- Age – describes age
  on 6 August 2017

=== Puerto Rico ===
Puerto Rico women's national basketball team roster
Players
Coaches

Pos.	No.	Name	Age – Date of birth	Height	Club	Ctr.
F	1	Tayra Meléndez	23 – October 29, 1993	1.80 m (5 ft 11 in)
F	2	Ashley Santos	23 – April 21, 1994	1.80 m (5 ft 11 in)
PG	5	Pamela Rosado	31 – April 30, 1986	1.62 m (5 ft 4 in)
C	7	Angelica Bermúdez	28 – July 2, 1989	1.87 m (6 ft 2 in)
SG	9	Allison Gibson	24 – March 27, 1993	1.52 m (5 ft 0 in)
PF	10	Paola Crespo	21 – June 13, 1996	1.85 m (6 ft 1 in)
G	11	Michelle González	28 – August 3, 1989	1.65 m (5 ft 5 in)
G	12	Dayshalee Salamán	26 – August 17, 1990	1.62 m (5 ft 4 in)
F	14	Marie Plácido	29 – August 18, 1987	1.70 m (5 ft 7 in)
G	22	Ashley Pérez	23 – February 12, 1994	1.72 m (5 ft 8 in)
PF	24	Yolanda Jones	33 – March 6, 1984	1.84 m (6 ft 0 in)
PF	25	Isalys Quiñones	19 – October 23, 1997	1.90 m (6 ft 3 in)

Head coach

- (Puerto Rico) Jerry Batista

Assistant coach(es)

- (Puerto Rico) Daniel Ortiz Gonzalez

Legend

- (C) Team captain
- Club field describes current or most recent club
- Age – describes age
  on August 6, 2017
