= 2021 FIBA Women's AmeriCup squads =

This article displays the rosters for the teams competing at the 2021 FIBA Women's AmeriCup. Each team had to submit 12 players.

== Group A ==
=== Brazil ===
The squad was announced on 10 June 2021.

Brazil women's national basketball team roster
Players
Coaches

Pos.	No.	Name	Age – Date of birth	Height	Club	Ctr.
C	0	Kamilla Silva	20 – 30 April 2001	2.04 m (6 ft 8 in)	South Carolina Gamecocks	(United States)
SF	4	Nany Carvalho	24 – 6 March 1997	1.86 m (6 ft 1 in)	Sesi Araraquara	(Brazil)
F	5	Rapha Monteiro	26 – 28 January 1995	1.81 m (5 ft 11 in)	Sampaio Basquete	(Brazil)
SG	6	Tássia Carcavalli	29 – 31 May 1992	1.76 m (5 ft 9 in)	Vera Cruz Campinas	(Brazil)
SG	7	Patrícia Teixeira	30 – 28 September 1990	1.75 m (5 ft 9 in)	FC Ituano	(Brazil)
G	8	Tainá Paixão	29 – 29 November 1991	1.73 m (5 ft 8 in)	Sesi Araraquara	(Brazil)
PF	11	Clarissa dos Santos	33 – 10 March 1988	1.86 m (6 ft 1 in)	ESB Villeneuve-d'Ascq	(France)
C	14	Érika de Souza	39 – 9 March 1982	1.97 m (6 ft 6 in)	FC Ituano	(Brazil)
PG	18	Débora Costa	29 – 12 August 1991	1.64 m (5 ft 5 in)	Sampaio Basquete	(Brazil)
PG	23	Alana Gonçalo	26 – 23 September 1994	1.66 m (5 ft 5 in)	FC Ituano	(Brazil)
SF	26	Thayna Silva	25 – 27 January 1996	1.80 m (5 ft 11 in)	Sodiê Doces/Mesquita/LSB	(Brazil)
PF	97	Mari Dias	23 – 12 October 1997	1.90 m (6 ft 3 in)	FC Ituano	(Brazil)

Head coach

- (Brazil) José Neto

Assistant coach(es)

- (Brazil) João Camargo
- (Brazil) Virgil López

Legend

- Club – describes last
  club before the tournament
- Age – describes age
  on 11 June 2021

=== Canada ===
The squad was announced on 10 June 2021.

Canada women's national basketball team roster
Players
Coaches

Pos.	No.	Name	Age – Date of birth	Height	Club	Ctr.
PG	1	Shaina Pellington	22 – 1 June 1999	1.70 m (5 ft 7 in)	Arizona Wildcats	(United States)
SG	2	Aislinn Konig	23 – 20 May 1998	1.75 m (5 ft 9 in)	BC Castors Braine	(Belgium)
SG	3	Merissah Russell	19 – 3 March 2002	1.80 m (5 ft 11 in)	Louisville Cardinals	(United States)
G	4	Sami Hill	26 – 22 November 1994	1.78 m (5 ft 10 in)	Nantes Rezé Basket	(France)
F	7	Nayo Raincock-Ekunwe	29 – 29 August 1991	1.88 m (6 ft 2 in)	ASVEL Féminin	(France)
F	9	Miranda Ayim	33 – 6 May 1988	1.91 m (6 ft 3 in)	Basket Landes	(France)
G	12	Jamie Scott	26 – 9 August 1994	1.78 m (5 ft 10 in)	Tarbes Gespe Bigorre	(France)
G	13	Shay Colley	25 – 6 January 1996	1.76 m (5 ft 9 in)	Charnay Basket Bourgogne SUD	(France)
C	14	Kayla Alexander	30 – 5 January 1991	1.93 m (6 ft 4 in)	Dynamo Novosibirsk	(Russia)
F	15	Laeticia Amihere	19 – 10 July 2001	1.86 m (6 ft 1 in)	South Carolina Gamecocks	(United States)
G	21	Nirra Fields	27 – 3 December 1993	1.76 m (5 ft 9 in)	İzmit Belediyespor	(Turkey)
F	24	Aaliyah Edwards	18 – 9 July 2002	1.91 m (6 ft 3 in)	UConn Huskies	(United States)

Head coach

- (Canada) Lisa Thomaidis

Assistant coach(es)

- (Canada) Steve Baur
- (Canada) Carly Clarke

Legend

- Club – describes last
  club before the tournament
- Age – describes age
  on 11 June 2021

=== Colombia ===
The squad was announced on 10 June 2021.

Colombia women's national basketball team roster
Players
Coaches

Pos.	No.	Name	Age – Date of birth	Height	Club	Ctr.
PG	4	Manuela Ríos	24 – 25 January 1997	1.65 m (5 ft 5 in)	Politécnico	(Mexico)
C	6	Yuliany Paz	20 – 20 June 2000	1.97 m (6 ft 6 in)	Leonas Medellin	(Colombia)
PG	7	Mayra Caicedo	21 – 12 January 2000	1.60 m (5 ft 3 in)	Northern New Mexico College	(United States)
PG	8	Carolina López	22 – 18 August 1998	1.65 m (5 ft 5 in)	Leonas Medellin	(Colombia)
PG	9	María Palacio	36 – 30 April 1985	1.63 m (5 ft 4 in)	Leonas Medellin	(Colombia)
F	10	Mabel Martínez	34 – 28 October 1986	1.72 m (5 ft 8 in)	Quimsa	(Argentina)
PF	11	Yanet Arias	38 – 14 October 1982	1.80 m (5 ft 11 in)	Leonas Medellin	(Colombia)
C	14	Marlyn Venté	25 – 8 July 1995	1.80 m (5 ft 11 in)	Leonas Medellin	(Colombia)
C	15	Narlyn Mosquera	31 – 15 December 1989	1.97 m (6 ft 6 in)	Mexcaltecas de Nayarit	(Mexico)
SF	16	Luz Asprilla	29 – 5 June 1992	1.83 m (6 ft 0 in)	Mexcaltecas de Nayarit	(Mexico)
PF	19	Daniela González	18 – 28 July 2002	1.80 m (5 ft 11 in)	Leonas Medellin	(Colombia)

Head coach

- (Colombia) Luis Cuenca

Assistant coach(es)

- (Colombia) Sandra Carvajal
- (Colombia) Ricardo Pinzon

Legend

- Club – describes last
  club before the tournament
- Age – describes age
  on 11 June 2021

=== El Salvador ===
El Salvador women's national basketball team roster
Players
Coaches

Pos.	No.	Name	Age – Date of birth	Height	Club	Ctr.
F	1	Carmen Noyola	29 – 14 March 1992	1.85 m (6 ft 1 in)	Santa Tecla BC	(El Salvador)
G	3	Claudia Hernández	23 – 26 February 1998	1.66 m (5 ft 5 in)	Universidad Anahuac	(Mexico)
PG	4	Katherine Cubias	23 – 2 March 1998	1.69 m (5 ft 7 in)	Universidad Anahuac	(Mexico)
F	5	Veronica Sosa	30 – 11 September 1990	1.75 m (5 ft 9 in)	Colorado State Rams	(United States)
F	7	Liliana Alvarado	23 – 29 July 1997	1.70 m (5 ft 7 in)	Universidad Evangélica	(El Salvador)
C	9	Silvia Vega	18 – 27 April 2003	1.84 m (6 ft 0 in)	Itexsal	(El Salvador)
PG	10	Keylin Murcia	18 – 1 January 2003	1.61 m (5 ft 3 in)	Universidad Montrer	(Mexico)
SG	12	Monica Calderon	30 – 30 May 1991	1.75 m (5 ft 9 in)	Universidad Don Bosco	(El Salvador)
F	14	Aida Funes	26 – 28 July 1994	1.70 m (5 ft 7 in)	CD Fas Fever	(El Salvador)
C	22	Kimberly Villalobos	19 – 10 December 2001	1.88 m (6 ft 2 in)	San Diego State Aztecs	(United States)
F	24	Emily Tévez	28 – 4 March 1993	1.75 m (5 ft 9 in)	Notre Dame Fighting Irish	(United States)
PG	77	María Méndez	31 – 5 June 1990	1.53 m (5 ft 0 in)	Turin BKB	(El Salvador)

Head coach

- (El Salvador) Jose Santana

Legend

- Club – describes last
  club before the tournament
- Age – describes age
  on 11 June 2021

=== Virgin Islands ===
Virgin Islands women's national basketball team roster
Players
Coaches

Pos.	No.	Name	Age – Date of birth	Height	Club	Ctr.
G	0	Kadasha Barry	25 – 26 July 1995	1.70 m (5 ft 7 in)
F	4	Molina Williams	19 – 2 November 2001	1.83 m (6 ft 0 in)	Charlotte 49ers	(United States)
G	5	Taylor Jones	23 – 12 July 1997	1.73 m (5 ft 8 in)	ZKK RMU Banovici	(Bosnia and Herzegovina)
G	6	Shomyra Francis	18 – 11 October 2002	1.75 m (5 ft 9 in)	Weatherford Coyotes	(United States)
G	7	Imani Tate	25 – 7 December 1995	1.74 m (5 ft 9 in)	Laboratorios Ynsadiet Leganes	(Spain)
G	8	Brittney Matthew	27 – 7 August 1993	1.70 m (5 ft 7 in)	Stephen F. Austin Ladyjacks	(United States)
SF	10	Lanese Bough	27 – 12 July 1993	1.73 m (5 ft 8 in)
F	11	Natalie Day	30 – 23 June 1990	1.83 m (6 ft 0 in)	Catz Lappeenranta	(Finland)
C	12	Anisha George	23 – 26 May 1998	1.88 m (6 ft 2 in)	Hélios VS Basket	(Switzerland)
F	13	Naja Ngongba Ngongba	18 – 17 March 2003	1.80 m (5 ft 11 in)	Radford Highlanders	(United States)
F	14	Alexis Boston	22 – 31 May 1999	1.85 m (6 ft 1 in)
PG	22	Akeema Richards	30 – 14 March 1991	1.74 m (5 ft 9 in)	Delaware Fightin' Blue Hens	(United States)

Head coach

- (United States Virgin Islands) Tajama Ngongba

Assistant coach(es)

- (United States Virgin Islands) Clint Williams

Legend

- Club – describes last
  club before the tournament
- Age – describes age
  on 11 June 2021

== Group B ==
=== Argentina ===
The squad was announced on 8 June 2021.

Argentina women's national basketball team roster
Players
Coaches

Pos.	No.	Name	Age – Date of birth	Height	Club	Ctr.
G	4	Macarena Rosset	30 – 23 February 1991	1.78 m (5 ft 10 in)	A.S.D. Pallacanestro Vigarano	(Italy)
SF	5	Agustina García	24 – 14 June 1996	1.73 m (5 ft 8 in)	Berazategui	(Argentina)
PF	6	Victoria Llorente	25 – 5 June 1996	1.80 m (5 ft 11 in)	Alter Enersun Al-Qázeres Extremadura	(Spain)
C	7	Diana Cabrera	27 – 7 August 1993	1.83 m (6 ft 0 in)	Fundacion Ardoi	(Argentina)
SF	8	Andrea Boquete	30 – 24 September 1990	1.83 m (6 ft 0 in)	Baxi Ferrol	(Spain)
C	10	Agostina Burani	29 – 4 October 1991	1.86 m (6 ft 1 in)	CB Estudiantes	(Spain)
G	11	Melisa Gretter	28 – 24 January 1993	1.67 m (5 ft 6 in)	CB Estudiantes	(Spain)
SG	20	Camila Suárez	20 – 12 July 2000	1.78 m (5 ft 10 in)	Obras Sanitarias	(Argentina)
PF	21	Victoria Gauna	19 – 22 July 2001	1.85 m (6 ft 1 in)	Berazategui	(Argentina)
C	24	Sol Castro	21 – 31 January 2000	1.86 m (6 ft 1 in)	Robert Morris Colonials	(United States)
C	27	Julieta Mungo	23 – 6 August 1997	1.81 m (5 ft 11 in)	Baxi Ferrol	(Spain)
PG	29	Julieta Ale	25 – 29 September 1995	1.76 m (5 ft 9 in)	Vélez Sarsfield	(Argentina)

Head coach

- (Argentina) Gregorio Martínez

Assistant coach(es)

- (Argentina) Sandra Pavón
- (Argentina) Sebastián Silva

Legend

- Club – describes last
  club before the tournament
- Age – describes age
  on 11 June 2021

=== Dominican Republic ===
The squad was announced on 8 June 2021.

Dominican Republic women's national basketball team roster
Players
Coaches

Pos.	No.	Name	Age – Date of birth	Height	Club	Ctr.
G	4	Julady Zapata	27 – 23 June 1993	1.65 m (5 ft 5 in)	Club del Sur	(Dominican Republic)
G	5	Yohanna Morton	33 – 12 December 1987	1.55 m (5 ft 1 in)	Club De Hostos	(Dominican Republic)
SG	6	Ashley Rojas	19 – 13 November 2001	1.72 m (5 ft 8 in)	Presentation Saints	(United States)
G	7	Genesis Evangelista	28 – 25 February 1993	1.80 m (5 ft 11 in)	Mauricio Báez BC	(Dominican Republic)
C	10	Solmilena Arias	20 – 15 September 2000	1.88 m (6 ft 2 in)
C	11	Marian Soto	29 – 2 October 1991	1.86 m (6 ft 1 in)
F	12	Flor Jones	23 – 5 May 1998	1.84 m (6 ft 0 in)	Club San Làzaro	(Dominican Republic)
C	13	Giocelis Reynoso	25 – 11 December 1995	1.90 m (6 ft 3 in)	Club Calero	(Dominican Republic)
C	15	Sugeiry Monsac	40 – 26 February 1981	1.85 m (6 ft 1 in)	Águilas de Guachupita	(Dominican Republic)
SG	21	Elemy Colome	24 – 7 October 1996	1.75 m (5 ft 9 in)
PG	23	Yamel Abreu	25 – 23 August 1995	1.70 m (5 ft 7 in)	Pueblo Nuevo	(Dominican Republic)

Head coach

- (Dominican Republic) Ariel Portuondo

Assistant coach(es)

- (Dominican Republic) Gleni Peralta
- (Dominican Republic) Miguel Reyes

Legend

- Club – describes last
  club before the tournament
- Age – describes age
  on 11 June 2021

=== Puerto Rico ===
The squad was announced on 10 June 2021.

Puerto Rico women's national basketball team roster
Players
Coaches

Pos.	No.	Name	Age – Date of birth	Height	Club	Ctr.
PG	0	Jennifer O'Neill	31 – 19 April 1990	1.65 m (5 ft 5 in)	AZS UMCS Lublin	(Poland)
F	1	Tayra Meléndez	27 – 29 October 1993	1.70 m (5 ft 7 in)	Gigantes	(Puerto Rico)
PG	5	Pamela Rosado	35 – 30 April 1986	1.65 m (5 ft 5 in)	Atenienses	(Puerto Rico)
SG	9	Allison Gibson	28 – 27 March 1993	1.91 m (6 ft 3 in)	Gigantes	(Puerto Rico)
F	10	Jada Stinson	21 – 28 September 1999	1.73 m (5 ft 8 in)	Arkansas State Red Wolves	(United States)
G	12	Dayshalee Salamán	31 – 17 March 1990	1.65 m (5 ft 5 in)	Cangrejeros	(Puerto Rico)
SG	24	Jazmon Gwathmey	28 – 24 January 1993	1.88 m (6 ft 2 in)	Geas Basket	(Italy)
PF	25	Isalys Quiñones	23 – 23 October 1997	1.91 m (6 ft 3 in)	Dartmouth Big Green	(United States)
F	28	Sabrina Lozada-Cabbage	24 – 3 January 1997	1.87 m (6 ft 2 in)	Vitória S.C.	(Portugal)
C	33	India Pagán	22 – 7 January 1999	1.87 m (6 ft 2 in)	Stony Brook Seawolves	(United States)
G	55	Jacqueline Benítez	24 – 6 June 1997	1.55 m (5 ft 1 in)
G	91	Michelle González	31 – 3 August 1989	1.68 m (5 ft 6 in)	Cangrejeros	(Puerto Rico)

Head coach

- (Puerto Rico) Jerry Batista

Assistant coach(es)

- (Puerto Rico) Carlos Calcaño
- (Puerto Rico) Daniel Ortiz

Legend

- Club – describes last
  club before the tournament
- Age – describes age
  on 11 June 2021

=== United States ===
The squad was announced on 6 June 2021.

United States women's national basketball team roster
Players
Coaches

Pos.	No.	Name	Age – Date of birth	Height	Club	Ctr.
G	4	Destanni Henderson	22 – 2 February 1999	1.72 m (5 ft 8 in)	South Carolina Gamecocks	(United States)
G	5	Ashley Owusu	20 – 22 January 2001	1.82 m (6 ft 0 in)	Maryland Terrapins	(United States)
G	6	Veronica Burton	20 – 12 July 2000	1.75 m (5 ft 9 in)	Northwestern Wildcats	(United States)
G	7	Jakia Brown-Turner	20 – 11 February 2001	1.82 m (6 ft 0 in)	NC State Wolfpack	(United States)
G	8	Grace Berger	22 – 3 June 1999	1.82 m (6 ft 0 in)	Indiana Hoosiers	(United States)
G	10	Haley Jones	20 – 23 May 2001	1.85 m (6 ft 1 in)	Stanford Cardinal	(United States)
F	11	Naz Hillmon	21 – 5 April 2000	1.85 m (6 ft 1 in)	Michigan Wolverines	(United States)
G	12	Diamond Miller	20 – 11 February 2001	1.85 m (6 ft 1 in)	Maryland Terrapins	(United States)
G	13	Rhyne Howard	21 – 29 April 2000	1.88 m (6 ft 2 in)	Kentucky Wildcats	(United States)
F	14	Aliyah Boston	19 – 11 December 2001	1.93 m (6 ft 4 in)	South Carolina Gamecocks	(United States)
F	15	Sedona Prince	21 – 12 May 2000	2.00 m (6 ft 7 in)	Oregon Ducks	(United States)
C	16	Elissa Cunane	20 – 25 September 2000	1.95 m (6 ft 5 in)	NC State Wolfpack	(United States)

Head coach

- (United States) Dawn Staley

Assistant coach(es)

- (United States) Adia Barnes
- (United States) Jennifer Rizzotti

Legend

- Club – describes last
  club before the tournament
- Age – describes age
  on 11 June 2021

=== Venezuela ===
Venezuela women's national basketball team roster
Players
Coaches

Pos.	No.	Name	Age – Date of birth	Height	Club	Ctr.
C	1	Nohelia Chile	18 – 20 December 2002	1.91 m (6 ft 3 in)	Pastoras de Lara	(Venezuela)
SF	2	Genesis Rivera	25 – 6 February 1996	1.78 m (5 ft 10 in)	Pastoras de Lara	(Venezuela)
SF	6	Yosimar Corrales	31 – 5 February 1990	1.81 m (5 ft 11 in)	Escaramuzas de Jalisco	(Mexico)
SG	7	Luisanny Zapata	19 – 30 July 2001	1.65 m (5 ft 5 in)	Universidad Modelo	(Mexico)
SF	9	Daniela Wallen	26 – 4 April 1995	1.78 m (5 ft 10 in)	Keflavík	(Iceland)
SF	10	Jairennys Arias	20 – 18 May 2001	1.70 m (5 ft 7 in)	Universidad Modelo	(Mexico)
C	11	Cynthia Añez	35 – 20 November 1985	1.83 m (6 ft 0 in)
C	12	Dayenlys Veliz	21 – 18 January 2000	1.76 m (5 ft 9 in)	Pastoras de Lara	(Venezuela)
PG	14	Waleska Pérez	27 – 17 February 1994	1.81 m (5 ft 11 in)	Pastoras de Lara	(Venezuela)
C	15	Siuly Marcano	25 – 3 January 1996	1.86 m (6 ft 1 in)	Pastoras de Lara	(Venezuela)
C	22	Aguehil Fajardo	21 – 6 October 1999	1.83 m (6 ft 0 in)	Quetzales Sajoma	(Mexico)
G	24	Guadalupe Diaz	21 – 7 December 1999	1.63 m (5 ft 4 in)	Pastoras de Lara	(Venezuela)

Head coach

- (Venezuela) Eduardo Pinto

Assistant coach(es)

- (Venezuela) Brickman Morales
- (Venezuela) Ángel Moreno

Legend

- Club – describes last
  club before the tournament
- Age – describes age
  on 11 June 2021
