= Basketball at the 2020 Summer Olympics – Women's team rosters =

This article shows the rosters of all participating teams at the women's basketball tournament at the 2020 Summer Olympics in Tokyo.

== Group A ==
=== Canada ===
Canada's women's basketball team of 12 athletes was announced on June 30, 2021.

Canada women's national basketball team – 2020 Summer Olympics roster
Players
Coaches

Pos.	No.	Name	Age – Date of birth	Height	Club	Ctr.
PG	1	Shaina Pellington	22 – 1 June 1999	1.70 m (5 ft 7 in)	Arizona Wildcats	(United States)
G	5	Kia Nurse	25 – 22 February 1996	1.82 m (6 ft 0 in)	Phoenix Mercury	(United States)
F	6	Bridget Carleton	24 – 22 May 1997	1.85 m (6 ft 1 in)	Minnesota Lynx	(United States)
F	7	Nayo Raincock-Ekunwe	29 – 29 August 1991	1.88 m (6 ft 2 in)	ASVEL Féminin	(France)
G	8	Kim Gaucher	37 – 7 May 1984	1.86 m (6 ft 1 in)	USO Mondeville	(France)
F	9	Miranda Ayim	33 – 6 May 1988	1.91 m (6 ft 3 in)	Basket Landes	(France)
C	11	Natalie Achonwa	28 – 22 November 1992	1.91 m (6 ft 3 in)	Minnesota Lynx	(United States)
G	13	Shay Colley	25 – 6 January 1996	1.76 m (5 ft 9 in)	Charnay Basket Bourgogne SUD	(France)
C	14	Kayla Alexander	30 – 5 January 1991	1.93 m (6 ft 4 in)	Dynamo Novosibirsk	(Russia)
F	15	Laeticia Amihere	20 – 10 July 2001	1.86 m (6 ft 1 in)	South Carolina Gamecocks	(United States)
G	21	Nirra Fields	27 – 3 December 1993	1.76 m (5 ft 9 in)	İzmit Belediyespor	(Turkey)
F	24	Aaliyah Edwards	19 – 9 July 2002	1.91 m (6 ft 3 in)	UConn Huskies	(United States)

Head coach

- (Canada) Lisa Thomaidis

Assistant coach(es)

- (Canada) Steve Baur
- (Canada) Carly Clarke

Legend

- Club – describes last
  club before the tournament
- Age – describes age
  on 26 July 2021

=== Serbia ===
Serbia women's national basketball team – 2020 Summer Olympics roster
Players
Coaches

Pos.	No.	Name	Age – Date of birth	Height	Club	Ctr.
SF	5	Sonja Vasić	32 – 18 February 1989	1.89 m (6 ft 2 in)	Spar Girona	(Spain)
SG	6	Saša Čađo	32 – 13 July 1989	1.78 m (5 ft 10 in)	Carolo Basket	(France)
SG	8	Nevena Jovanović	31 – 30 June 1990	1.79 m (5 ft 10 in)	Sopron Basket	(Hungary)
PF	9	Jelena Brooks	32 – 28 April 1989	1.90 m (6 ft 3 in)	Sopron Basket	(Hungary)
G	10	Dajana Butulija	35 – 23 February 1986	1.75 m (5 ft 9 in)	Ślęza Wrocław	(Poland)
PF	11	Aleksandra Crvendakić	25 – 17 March 1996	1.87 m (6 ft 2 in)	ASVEL Féminin	(France)
PG	12	Yvonne Anderson	31 – 8 March 1990	1.75 m (5 ft 9 in)	Reyer Venezia	(Italy)
C	14	Dragana Stanković	26 – 18 January 1995	1.96 m (6 ft 5 in)	USK Praha	(Czech Republic)
SG	23	Ana Dabović	31 – 18 August 1989	1.83 m (6 ft 0 in)	Basket Lattes	(France)
PF	24	Maja Škorić	31 – 10 November 1989	1.84 m (6 ft 0 in)	KSC Szekszárd	(Hungary)
PF	32	Angela Dugalić	19 – 29 December 2001	1.93 m (6 ft 4 in)	Oregon Ducks	(United States)
C	33	Tina Krajišnik	30 – 12 January 1991	1.90 m (6 ft 3 in)	Galatasaray	(Turkey)

Head coach

- (Serbia) Marina Maljković

Assistant coach(es)

- (Serbia) Miloš Pađen
- (Serbia) Vladimir Vuksanović

Legend

- Club – describes last
  club before the tournament
- Age – describes age
  on 26 July 2021

=== South Korea ===
The roster was announced on 23 June 2021.

South Korea women's national basketball team – 2020 Summer Olympics roster
Players
Coaches

Pos.	No.	Name	Age – Date of birth	Height	Club	Ctr.
PG	1	Shin Ji-hyun	25 – 12 September 1995	1.73 m (5 ft 8 in)	Bucheon Hana 1Q	(South Korea)
PF	2	Han Eom-ji	22 – 10 November 1998	1.79 m (5 ft 10 in)	Incheon S-Birds	(South Korea)
F	3	Kang Lee-seul	27 – 5 April 1994	1.80 m (5 ft 11 in)	Cheongju KB Stars	(South Korea)
G	4	Yoon Ye-bin	24 – 16 April 1997	1.80 m (5 ft 11 in)	Samsung Life Blueminx	(South Korea)
PG	5	An He-ji	24 – 12 February 1997	1.64 m (5 ft 5 in)	Busan BNK Sum	(South Korea)
G	7	Park Hye-jin	31 – 22 July 1990	1.78 m (5 ft 10 in)	Asan Woori Bank Wibee	(South Korea)
F	9	Park Ji-hyun	21 – 7 April 2000	1.85 m (6 ft 1 in)	Asan Woori Bank Wibee	(South Korea)
C	11	Bae Hye-yoon	32 – 10 June 1989	1.82 m (6 ft 0 in)	Samsung Life Blueminx	(South Korea)
F	13	Kim Jung-eun	33 – 7 September 1987	1.80 m (5 ft 11 in)	Asan Woori Bank Wibee	(South Korea)
C	19	Park Ji-su	22 – 6 December 1998	1.98 m (6 ft 6 in)	Las Vegas Aces	(United States)
F	23	Kim Dan-bi	31 – 27 February 1990	1.80 m (5 ft 11 in)	Incheon S-Birds	(South Korea)
F	31	Jin An	25 – 23 March 1996	1.85 m (6 ft 1 in)	Busan BNK Sum	(South Korea)

Head coach

- (South Korea) Chun Joo-weon

Assistant coach(es)

- (South Korea) Lee Mi-sun

Legend

- Club – describes last
  club before the tournament
- Age – describes age
  on 26 July 2021

=== Spain ===
A 14-player roster was announced on 7 July 2021. The final squad was revealed on 11 July 2021.

Spain women's national basketball team – 2020 Summer Olympics roster
Players
Coaches

Pos.	No.	Name	Age – Date of birth	Height	Club	Ctr.
PG	5	Cristina Ouviña	30 – 18 September 1990	1.73 m (5 ft 8 in)	Valencia Basket	(Spain)
G	6	Silvia Domínguez	34 – 31 January 1987	1.65 m (5 ft 5 in)	Perfumerías Avenida	(Spain)
SF	7	Alba Torrens	31 – 30 August 1989	1.92 m (6 ft 4 in)	UMMC Ekaterinburg	(Russia)
PG	9	Laia Palau	41 – 10 September 1979	1.78 m (5 ft 10 in)	Uni Girona CB	(Spain)
SG	11	Leonor Rodríguez	29 – 21 October 1991	1.80 m (5 ft 11 in)	Perfumerías Avenida	(Spain)
PG	12	Maite Cazorla	24 – 18 June 1997	1.78 m (5 ft 10 in)	Perfumerías Avenida	(Spain)
PF	13	Tamara Abalde	32 – 6 February 1989	1.92 m (6 ft 4 in)	Porta XI Ensino	(Spain)
C	14	Raquel Carrera	19 – 31 October 2001	1.90 m (6 ft 3 in)	Valencia Basket	(Spain)
SF	18	Queralt Casas	28 – 18 November 1992	1.80 m (5 ft 11 in)	Valencia Basket	(Spain)
SF	22	María Conde	24 – 14 January 1997	1.86 m (6 ft 1 in)	USK Praha	(Czech Republic)
C	24	Laura Gil	29 – 24 April 1992	1.90 m (6 ft 3 in)	Valencia Basket	(Spain)
C	45	Astou Ndour	26 – 22 August 1994	1.98 m (6 ft 6 in)	Hatay BB	(Turkey)

Head coach

- (Spain) Lucas Mondelo

Assistant coach(es)

- (Spain) Roberto Hernández
- (Spain) Madelén Urieta

Legend

- Club – describes last
  club before the tournament
- Age – describes age
  on 26 July 2021

== Group B ==
=== France ===
A 15-player roster was announced on 1 July 2021. The final roster was revealed on 5 July 2021.

France women's national basketball team – 2020 Summer Olympics roster
Players
Coaches

Pos.	No.	Name	Age – Date of birth	Height	Club	Ctr.
PG	4	Marine Fauthoux	20 – 23 January 2001	1.76 m (5 ft 9 in)	ASVEL Féminin	(France)
PF	5	Endéné Miyem	33 – 15 May 1988	1.88 m (6 ft 2 in)	Flammes Carolo	(France)
PF	6	Alexia Chartereau	22 – 5 September 1998	1.90 m (6 ft 3 in)	Tango Bourges Basket	(France)
C	7	Sandrine Gruda	34 – 25 June 1987	1.93 m (6 ft 4 in)	PF Schio	(Italy)
C	8	Héléna Ciak	31 – 15 December 1989	1.97 m (6 ft 6 in)	ASVEL Féminin	(France)
SG	10	Sarah Michel	32 – 10 January 1989	1.80 m (5 ft 11 in)	Tango Bourges Basket	(France)
SF	11	Valériane Vukosavljević	27 – 29 April 1994	1.84 m (6 ft 0 in)	Basket Lattes	(France)
C	12	Iliana Rupert	20 – 12 July 2001	1.94 m (6 ft 4 in)	Tango Bourges Basket	(France)
F	15	Gabby Williams	24 – 9 September 1996	1.80 m (5 ft 11 in)	Sopron Basket	(Hungary)
SG	23	Marine Johannès	26 – 21 January 1995	1.77 m (5 ft 10 in)	ASVEL Féminin	(France)
PG	39	Alix Duchet	23 – 30 December 1997	1.68 m (5 ft 6 in)	Tango Bourges Basket	(France)
SF	93	Diandra Tchatchouang	30 – 14 June 1991	1.89 m (6 ft 2 in)	Basket Lattes	(France)

Head coach

- (France) Valérie Garnier

Assistant coach(es)

- (France) Grégory Halin
- (France) Olivier Lafargue
- (France) Rachid Meziane

Legend

- Club – describes last
  club before the tournament
- Age – describes age
  on 26 July 2021

=== Japan ===
The roster was announced on 1 July 2021.

Japan women's national basketball team – 2020 Summer Olympics roster
Players
Coaches

Pos.	No.	Name	Age – Date of birth	Height	Club
PF	0	Moeko Nagaoka	27 – 29 December 1993	1.83 m (6 ft 0 in)	Toyota Antelopes	(Japan)
C	8	Maki Takada	31 – 23 August 1989	1.85 m (6 ft 1 in)	Denso Iris	(Japan)
SG	12	Naho Miyoshi	27 – 21 December 1993	1.67 m (5 ft 6 in)	Toyota Antelopes	(Japan)
PG	13	Rui Machida	28 – 8 March 1993	1.62 m (5 ft 4 in)	Fujitsu Red Wave	(Japan)
PG	15	Nako Motohashi	27 – 10 October 1993	1.65 m (5 ft 5 in)	Haneda Vickies	(Japan)
SG	20	Nanako Todo	20 – 29 November 2000	1.74 m (5 ft 9 in)	Toyota Boshoku Sunshine Rabbits	(Japan)
SG	27	Saki Hayashi	26 – 16 March 1995	1.73 m (5 ft 8 in)	JX-Eneos Sunflowers	(Japan)
PF	30	Evelyn Mawuli	26 – 2 June 1995	1.81 m (5 ft 11 in)	Toyota Antelopes	(Japan)
PG	32	Saori Miyazaki	25 – 27 August 1995	1.67 m (5 ft 6 in)	JX-Eneos Sunflowers	(Japan)
PF	52	Yuki Miyazawa	28 – 2 June 1993	1.83 m (6 ft 0 in)	Fujitsu Red Wave	(Japan)
SF	88	Himawari Akaho	22 – 28 August 1998	1.85 m (6 ft 1 in)	Denso Iris	(Japan)
PF	99	Monica Okoye	22 – 7 February 1999	1.82 m (6 ft 0 in)	Fujitsu Red Wave	(Japan)

Head coach

- (United States) Tom Hovasse

Assistant coach(es)

- (Japan) Toru Ontsuka

Legend

- Club – describes last
  club before the tournament
- Age – describes age
  on 26 July 2021

=== Nigeria ===
A 15-player roster was announced on 6 July 2021. The final roster was released on 19 July 2021.

Nigeria national basketball team – 2020 Summer Olympics roster
Players
Coaches

Pos.	No.	Name	Age – Date of birth	Height	Club	Ctr.
F	0	Amy Okonkwo	24 – 26 August 1996	1.88 m (6 ft 2 in)	Uni Girona CB	(Spain)
C	3	Pallas Kunaiyi-Akpannah	23 – 12 July 1997	1.88 m (6 ft 2 in)	Faenza Basket Project	(Belgium)
G	4	Elizabeth Balogun	20 – 9 September 2000	1.85 m (6 ft 1 in)	Louisville Cardinals	(United States)
F	9	Aisha Mohammed	35 – 21 October 1985	1.93 m (6 ft 4 in)	Bashkimi Prizren	(Kosovo)
PG	10	Promise Amukamara	28 – 22 June 1993	1.75 m (5 ft 9 in)	Charnay BB	(France)
F	11	Adaora Elonu	31 – 28 April 1990	1.85 m (6 ft 1 in)	Nadezhda Orenburg	(Russia)
PF	21	Atonye Nyingifa	30 – 8 December 1990	1.83 m (6 ft 0 in)	CB Isla Única	(Spain)
C	22	Oderah Chidom	26 – 9 July 1995	1.93 m (6 ft 4 in)	Angers	(France)
PG	23	Ezinne Kalu	29 – 26 June 1992	1.73 m (5 ft 8 in)	Landerneau BB	(France)
C	25	Victoria Macaulay	30 – 7 August 1990	1.93 m (6 ft 4 in)	Bursa	(Turkey)
G	31	Erica Ogwumike	23 – 26 September 1997	1.75 m (5 ft 9 in)	Free agent
SF	52	Ify Ibekwe	31 – 5 October 1989	1.88 m (6 ft 2 in)	Free agent

Head coach

- (United States) Otis Hughley Jr.

Assistant coach(es)

- (United States) Roosevelt Cochran
- (United States) Jessie Kenlaw

Legend

- Club – describes last
  club before the tournament
- Age – describes age
  on 26 July 2021

=== United States ===
The roster was announced on 21 June 2021.

United States women's national basketball team – 2020 Summer Olympics roster
Players
Coaches

Pos.	No.	Name	Age – Date of birth	Height	Club	Ctr.
G	4	Jewell Loyd	27 – 5 October 1993	1.75 m (5 ft 9 in)	Seattle Storm	(United States)
G	5	Skylar Diggins-Smith	30 – 2 August 1990	1.75 m (5 ft 9 in)	Phoenix Mercury	(United States)
G	6	Sue Bird	40 – 16 October 1980	1.75 m (5 ft 9 in)	Seattle Storm	(United States)
G	7	Ariel Atkins	24 – 30 July 1996	1.73 m (5 ft 8 in)	Washington Mystics	(United States)
SG	8	Chelsea Gray	28 – 8 October 1992	1.80 m (5 ft 11 in)	Las Vegas Aces	(United States)
F	9	A'ja Wilson	24 – 8 August 1996	1.93 m (6 ft 4 in)	Las Vegas Aces	(United States)
PF	10	Breanna Stewart	26 – 27 August 1994	1.91 m (6 ft 3 in)	Seattle Storm	(United States)
SF	11	Napheesa Collier	24 – 23 September 1996	1.86 m (6 ft 1 in)	Minnesota Lynx	(United States)
SG	12	Diana Taurasi	39 – 11 June 1982	1.82 m (6 ft 0 in)	Phoenix Mercury	(United States)
C	13	Sylvia Fowles	35 – 6 October 1985	1.98 m (6 ft 6 in)	Minnesota Lynx	(United States)
C	14	Tina Charles	32 – 5 December 1988	1.93 m (6 ft 4 in)	Washington Mystics	(United States)
C	15	Brittney Griner	30 – 18 October 1990	2.03 m (6 ft 8 in)	Phoenix Mercury	(United States)

Head coach

- (United States) Dawn Staley

Assistant coach(es)

- (United States) Dan Hughes
- (United States) Cheryl Reeve
- (United States) Jennifer Rizzotti

Legend

- (C) Team captain
- Club – describes last
  club before the tournament
- Age – describes age
  on 26 July 2021

== Group C ==
=== Australia ===
The roster was announced on 26 May 2021. Liz Cambage withdrew before the tournament on 16 July 2021 and replaced by Sara Blicavs.

Australia women's national basketball team – 2020 Summer Olympics roster
Players
Coaches

Pos.	No.	Name	Age – Date of birth	Height	Club	Ctr.
G	4	Jenna O'Hea (C)	34 – 6 June 1987	1.86 m (6 ft 1 in)	Southside Flyers	(Australia)
G	5	Leilani Mitchell	36 – 15 June 1985	1.65 m (5 ft 5 in)	Washington Mystics	(United States)
SF	6	Stephanie Talbot	27 – 15 June 1994	1.88 m (6 ft 2 in)	Seattle Storm	(United States)
G	7	Tess Madgen	30 – 12 August 1990	1.80 m (5 ft 11 in)	Melbourne Boomers	(Australia)
PF	8	Sara Blicavs	28 – 15 February 1993	1.88 m (6 ft 2 in)	Southside Flyers	(Australia)
SF	9	Rebecca Allen	28 – 6 November 1992	1.88 m (6 ft 2 in)	New York Liberty	(United States)
G	10	Katie-Rae Ebzery	31 – 8 January 1990	1.78 m (5 ft 10 in)	Perth Lynx	(Australia)
F	11	Alanna Smith	24 – 10 September 1996	1.90 m (6 ft 3 in)	Phoenix Mercury	(United States)
PG	12	Tessa Lavey	28 – 29 March 1993	1.72 m (5 ft 8 in)	Bendigo Spirit	(Australia)
F	13	Ezi Magbegor	21 – 13 August 1999	1.93 m (6 ft 4 in)	Seattle Storm	(United States)
C	14	Marianna Tolo	32 – 2 July 1989	1.96 m (6 ft 5 in)	University of Canberra Capitals	(Australia)
F	15	Cayla George	32 – 1 May 1989	1.93 m (6 ft 4 in)	Melbourne Boomers	(Australia)

Head coach

- (Australia) Sandy Brondello

Assistant coach(es)

- (Australia) Paul Goriss
- (Germany) Olaf Lange

Legend

- (C) Team captain
- Club – describes last
  club before the tournament
- Age – describes age
  on 26 July 2021

=== Belgium ===
The roster was announced on 4 July 2021.

Belgium women's national basketball team – 2020 Summer Olympics roster
Players
Coaches

Pos.	No.	Name	Age – Date of birth	Height	Club	Ctr.
SG	5	Kim Mestdagh	31 – 12 March 1990	1.80 m (5 ft 11 in)	PF Schio	(Italy)
SF	6	Antonia Delaere	26 – 1 August 1994	1.82 m (6 ft 0 in)	Basket Zaragoza	(Spain)
PG	9	Marjorie Carpréaux	33 – 17 September 1987	1.64 m (5 ft 5 in)	Castors Braine	(Belgium)
PF	11	Emma Meesseman	28 – 13 May 1993	1.93 m (6 ft 4 in)	UMMC Ekaterinburg	(Russia)
C	12	Ann Wauters	40 – 12 October 1980	1.95 m (6 ft 5 in)	Free agent
C	13	Kyara Linskens	24 – 13 November 1996	1.93 m (6 ft 4 in)	Nadezhda Orenburg	(Russia)
F	22	Hanne Mestdagh	28 – 19 April 1993	1.78 m (5 ft 10 in)	Namur-Capitale	(Belgium)
F	32	Heleen Nauwelaers	25 – 14 March 1996	1.80 m (5 ft 11 in)	Granada	(Spain)
C	34	Billie Massey	21 – 21 March 2000	1.86 m (6 ft 1 in)	Kangoeroes Basket Mechelen	(Belgium)
PG	35	Julie Vanloo	28 – 10 February 1993	1.68 m (5 ft 6 in)	BC Enisey	(Russia)
PF	42	Jana Raman	30 – 15 February 1991	1.86 m (6 ft 1 in)	CB Estudiantes	(Spain)
PG	55	Julie Allemand	25 – 7 July 1996	1.74 m (5 ft 9 in)	ASVEL Féminin	(France)

Head coach

- (Belgium) Philip Mestdagh

Assistant coach(es)

- (Belgium) Sven Van Camp
- (Belgium) Pierre Cornia

Legend

- Club – describes last
  club before the tournament
- Age – describes age
  on 26 July 2021

=== China ===
The roster was announced on 3 July 2021.

China women's national basketball team – 2020 Summer Olympics roster
Players
Coaches

Pos.	No.	Name	Age – Date of birth	Height	Club
PG	3	Yang Liwei	26 – 2 January 1995	1.76 m (5 ft 9 in)	Guangdong Vermilion Birds	(China)
G	4	Li Yuan	21 – 29 May 2000	1.70 m (5 ft 7 in)	Shandong Six Stars	(China)
G	5	Wang Siyu	25 – 16 October 1995	1.80 m (5 ft 11 in)	Shandong Six Stars	(China)
G	6	Wu Tongtong	27 – 27 June 1994	1.75 m (5 ft 9 in)	Shanxi Flame	(China)
SF	7	Shao Ting (C)	31 – 10 December 1989	1.84 m (6 ft 0 in)	Sichuan Blue Whales	(China)
F	8	Zhang Ru	21 – 2 September 1999	1.85 m (6 ft 1 in)	Henan Phoenix	(China)
SG	9	Li Meng	26 – 2 January 1995	1.83 m (6 ft 0 in)	Liaoning Flying Eagles	(China)
F	10	Pan Zhenqi	26 – 5 July 1995	1.90 m (6 ft 3 in)	Beijing Great Wall	(China)
PF	11	Huang Sijing	25 – 8 January 1996	1.90 m (6 ft 3 in)	Guangdong Vermilion Birds	(China)
C	13	Sun Mengran	29 – 16 July 1992	1.97 m (6 ft 6 in)	Shandong Six Stars	(China)
C	14	Li Yueru	22 – 28 March 1999	2.00 m (6 ft 7 in)	Guangdong Vermilion Birds	(China)
C	15	Han Xu	21 – 31 October 1999	2.05 m (6 ft 9 in)	Xinjiang Magic Deer	(China)

Head coach

- (China) Xu Limin

Assistant coach(es)

- (China) Jia Nan
- (China) Zheng Wei

Legend

- Club – describes last
  club before the tournament
- Age – describes age
  on 26 July 2021

=== Puerto Rico ===
The roster was announced on 8 July 2021.

Puerto Rico women's national basketball team – 2020 Summer Olympics roster
Players
Coaches

Pos.	No.	Name	Age – Date of birth	Height	Club	Ctr.
PG	0	Jennifer O'Neill	31 – 19 April 1990	1.65 m (5 ft 5 in)	Samara	(Russia)
F	1	Tayra Meléndez	27 – 29 October 1993	1.70 m (5 ft 7 in)	Gigantes de Carolina	(Puerto Rico)
PG	5	Pamela Rosado	35 – 30 April 1986	1.65 m (5 ft 5 in)	Atenienses de Manatí	(Puerto Rico)
SG	9	Allison Gibson	28 – 27 March 1993	1.91 m (6 ft 3 in)	Gigantes de Carolina	(Puerto Rico)
F	10	Jada Stinson	21 – 28 September 1999	1.73 m (5 ft 8 in)	Arkansas State Red Wolves	(United States)
G	12	Dayshalee Salamán	31 – 17 March 1990	1.65 m (5 ft 5 in)	Cangrejeras de Santurce	(Puerto Rico)
SG	24	Jazmon Gwathmey	28 – 24 January 1993	1.88 m (6 ft 2 in)	Geas Basket	(Italy)
PF	25	Isalys Quiñones	23 – 23 October 1997	1.91 m (6 ft 3 in)	Tarbes Gespe Bigorre	(France)
F	28	Sabrina Lozada-Cabbage	24 – 3 January 1997	1.87 m (6 ft 2 in)	Geas Basket	(Italy)
C	33	India Pagán	22 – 7 January 1999	1.87 m (6 ft 2 in)	Stony Brook Seawolves	(United States)
G	55	Jacqueline Benítez	24 – 6 June 1997	1.55 m (5 ft 1 in)	KK Šiauliai	(Lithuania)
G	91	Michelle González	31 – 3 August 1989	1.68 m (5 ft 6 in)	Cangrejeras de Santurce	(Puerto Rico)

Head coach

- (Puerto Rico) Jerry Batista

Assistant coach(es)

- (Puerto Rico) Carlos Calcaño
- (Puerto Rico) Daniel Ortiz

Legend

- Club – describes last
  club before the tournament
- Age – describes age
  on 26 July 2021
