= 2017 FIBA Women's AmeriCup =

14th FIBA Women's Americas Basketball Championship

Tournament details
- Host country: Argentina
- City: Buenos Aires
- Dates: 6–13 August
- Teams: 10 (from 1 confederation)
- Venue: 1 (in 1 host city)

Final positions
- Champions: Canada (3rd title)

Tournament statistics
- MVP: (Canada) Nirra Fields
- Top scorer: (Paraguay) Ferrari (21.8)
- Top rebounds: (United States Virgin Islands) Day (10.5)
- Top assists: (Cuba) Casanova (7.8)
- PPG (Team): Canada (76.3)
- RPG (Team): Canada (50.8)
- APG (Team): Canada (16.8)

Official website
- Official website

The 2017 FIBA Women's AmeriCup was held in Buenos Aires, Argentina from 6 to 13 August 2017. It awarded three spots for FIBA Americas to the 2018 FIBA Women's Basketball World Cup in Spain.

Canada won their second straight title by defeating Argentina 67–65. Puerto Rico won their first ever medal after beating Brazil 75–68 in the third place game.

== Venue ==
Buenos Aires	2017 FIBA Women's AmeriCup is located in Argentina
Estadio Obras Sanitarias	2017 FIBA Women's AmeriCup is located in Argentina
Capacity: 3,100	2017 FIBA Women's AmeriCup is located in Argentina

== Qualification ==
- Host nation
  - Argentina
- North America Subzone:
  - Canada (qualified automatically)
- Central America and Caribbean Subzone:
  - Cuba (qualified automatically)
- Central America and Caribbean Subzone: 2017 Women's Centrobasket Championship
  - Mexico
  - Puerto Rico
  - Virgin Islands
- South America Subzone: 2016 South American Basketball Championship for Women
  - Brazil
  - Colombia
  - Paraguay
  - Venezuela

== Draw ==
The draw was held on 19 July 2017 in San Juan, Puerto Rico.

== Preliminary round ==
All times are local (UTC−3).

=== Group A ===
Pos	Team	Pld	W	L	PF	PA	PD	Pts	Qualification
1	Argentina (H)	4	4	0	297	203	+94	8	Semifinals
2	Brazil	4	2	2	248	245	+3	6 (Note: Brazil 3 Pts, +14 PD; Virgin Islands 3 Pts, 0 PD; Colombia 3 Pts, −14 PD)	Semifinals
3	Virgin Islands	4	2	2	257	263	−6	6	
4	Colombia	4	2	2	226	260	−34	6	
5	Venezuela	4	0	4	234	291	−57	4	

Source: FIBA
Rules for classification: 1) Points; 2) Head-to-head results; 3) Points difference; 4) Points scored.
(H) Hosts
Notes:

6 August 2017
13:35

Boxscore

Brazil	71–63	Venezuela
Scoring by quarter: 17–13, 16–11, 21–15, 17–24
Pts: Pacheco, Justino 12; Rebs: Justino 10; Asts: three players 3		Pts: Pérez 21; Rebs: Wallen 6 Asts: Márquez 4

Estadio Obras Sanitarias, Buenos Aires
Referees: Andrés Bartel (URU), Gina Cross (USA), Yuliet Méndez (CUB)

6 August 2017
21:05

Boxscore

Virgin Islands	48–80	Argentina
Scoring by quarter: 12–18, 9–14, 7–34, 20–14
Pts: Tate 19; Rebs: Day 10; Asts: Tate 3		Pts: Boquete 17; Rebs: Fiorotto 7 Asts: González 4

Estadio Obras Sanitarias, Buenos Aires
Referees: Roberto Vázquez (PUR), Alejandra Gaytán (MEX) Maripier Malo (CAN)

7 August 2017
16:05

Boxscore

Venezuela	53–79	Virgin Islands
Scoring by quarter: 10–10, 14–22, 10–19, 19–28
Pts: Wallen, Renault 12; Rebs: Renault 9 Asts: Márquez 8		Pts: Tate 26; Rebs: Day 14; Asts: Bough 5

Estadio Obras Sanitarias, Buenos Aires
Referees: Maripier Malo (CAN), Andrés Bartel (URU), Felipe Ibarra (CHI)

7 August 2017
18:35

Boxscore

Colombia	47–68	Brazil
Scoring by quarter: 15–17, 5–16, 9–14, 18–21
Pts: Muñoz, Mosquera 13; Rebs: Asprilla 7 Asts: Muñoz 4		Pts: L. Rodrigues 13; Rebs: L. Rodrigues 17; Asts: Honório, Teixeira 3

Estadio Obras Sanitarias, Buenos Aires
Referees: Roberto Vázquez (PUR), Alejandra Gaytán (MEX), Yuliet Méndez (CUB)

8 August 2017
13:35

Boxscore

Virgin Islands	63–70	Colombia
Scoring by quarter: 6–15, 13–23, 26–20, 18–12
Pts: Tate 16; Rebs: Tate 6 Asts: Barry 4		Pts: Mosquera 15; Rebs: Asprilla 8 Asts: Mosquera 5

Estadio Obras Sanitarias, Buenos Aires
Referees: Roberto Vázquez (PUR), Felipe Ibarra (CHI), Maripier Malo (CAN)

8 August 2017
21:05

Boxscore

Argentina	79–59	Venezuela
Scoring by quarter: 21–12, 19–11, 22–12, 17–24
Pts: Durso, Boquete 13; Rebs: Santana 11; Asts: Gretter, González 4		Pts: Corrales 19; Rebs: Wallen 12; Asts: Pérez 3

Estadio Obras Sanitarias, Buenos Aires
Referees: Gina Cross (USA), Alejandra Gaytán (MEX), Yuliet Méndez (CUB)

9 August 2017
16:05

Boxscore

Brazil	60–67 (OT)	Virgin Islands
Scoring by quarter: 13–13, 10–15, 19–15, 16–15, Overtime: 2–9
Pts: Monteiro da Silva 15; Rebs: Monteiro da Silva 9 Asts: Honório, L. Rodrigues 4		Pts: Day 20; Rebs: Day 13; Asts: Bough, Tate 5

Estadio Obras Sanitarias, Buenos Aires
Referees: Gina Cross (USA), Alejandra Gaytán (MEX), Yuliet Méndez (CUB)

9 August 2017
21:05

Boxscore

Colombia	47–70	Argentina
Scoring by quarter: 10–16, 7–20, 16–11, 14–23
Pts: Ríos 10; Rebs: Muñoz 8 Asts: six players 1		Pts: Rosset, Gretter 16; Rebs: Fiorotto 9 Asts: Durso, Gretter 4

Estadio Obras Sanitarias, Buenos Aires
Referees: Maripier Malo (CAN), Andrés Bartel (URU), Felipe Ibarra (CHI)

10 August 2017
18:35

Boxscore

Venezuela	59–62	Colombia
Scoring by quarter: 15–14, 13–17, 14–21, 17–10
Pts: Márquez 17; Rebs: Durán 9 Asts: Márquez 6		Pts: Martínez 19; Rebs: Prens 11; Asts: Ríos, Martínez 3

Estadio Obras Sanitarias, Buenos Aires
Referees: Maripier Malo (CAN), Felipe Ibarra (CHI), Yuliet Méndez (CUB)

10 August 2017
21:05

Boxscore

Argentina	68–49	Brazil
Scoring by quarter: 18–14, 20–9, 22–15, 8–11
Pts: González 18; Rebs: Burani 10; Asts: Gretter 7		Pts: Justino 18; Rebs: Justino 9 Asts: Macedo, J. Rodrigues 3

Estadio Obras Sanitarias, Buenos Aires
Referees: Roberto Vázquez (PUR), Andrés Bartel (URU), Alejandra Gaytán (MEX)

=== Group B ===
Pos	Team	Pld	W	L	PF	PA	PD	Pts	Qualification
1	Canada	4	4	0	307	197	+110	8	Semifinals
2	Puerto Rico	4	3	1	279	258	+21	7	Semifinals
3	Paraguay	4	2	2	273	300	−27	6	
4	Cuba	4	1	3	230	271	−41	5	
5	Mexico	4	0	4	206	269	−63	4	

Source: FIBA
Rules for classification: 1) Points; 2) Head-to-head results; 3) Points difference; 4) Points scored.

6 August 2017
16:05

Boxscore

Puerto Rico	69–49	Mexico
Scoring by quarter: 24–14, 19–7, 14–18, 12–10
Pts: Gibson 13; Rebs: Bermúdez 6 Asts: Rosado, Salaman 4		Pts: Luna 16; Rebs: Luna 11; Asts: Luna, Núñez 3

Estadio Obras Sanitarias, Buenos Aires
Referees: Leonardo Zalazar (ARG), Rodrigo Mejía (COL), Virginia Peruchini (ARG)

6 August 2017
18:35

Boxscore

Cuba	35–81	Canada
Scoring by quarter: 8–28, 10–22, 6–14, 11–17
Pts: Galindo 12; Rebs: three players 7 Asts: Casanova, Martínez 1		Pts: Fields 18; Rebs: Hamblin 10; Asts: Colley 5

Estadio Obras Sanitarias, Buenos Aires
Referees: Leandro Lezcano (ARG), Felipe Ibarra (CHI), Andreia Silva (BRA)

7 August 2017
13:35

Boxscore

Paraguay	69–66	Cuba
Scoring by quarter: 20–22, 13–18, 22–10, 14–16
Pts: Ferrari 27; Rebs: Caraves 11; Asts: Ferrari, Caraves 4		Pts: Casanova, Oquendo 14; Rebs: Ochoa, Oquendo 12; Asts: Casanova 13

Estadio Obras Sanitarias, Buenos Aires
Referees: Leandro Lezcano (ARG), Rodrigo Mejía (COL), Virginia Peruchini (ARG)

7 August 2017
21:05

Boxscore

Canada	75–59	Puerto Rico
Scoring by quarter: 18–12, 20–17, 19–12, 18–18
Pts: Nurse 17; Rebs: Nurse 8 Asts: Langlois, Fields 3		Pts: Gibson 16; Rebs: Rosado 6 Asts: Rosado 4

Estadio Obras Sanitarias, Buenos Aires
Referees: Gina Cross (USA), Andreia Silva (BRA), Leonardo Zalazar (ARG)

8 August 2017
16:05

Boxscore

Mexico	39–65	Canada
Scoring by quarter: 8–15, 12–13, 8–21, 11–16
Pts: Torre 8 Rebs: Núñez 7 Asts: Pardo 2		Pts: Fields 13; Rebs: Ayim 6 Asts: Langlois 6

Estadio Obras Sanitarias, Buenos Aires
Referees: Leonardo Zalazar (ARG), Kendell Henry (ISV), Rodrigo Mejía (COL)

8 August 2017
18:35

Boxscore

Puerto Rico	81–67	Paraguay
Scoring by quarter: 18–19, 19–12, 22–17, 22–19
Pts: Placido 14; Rebs: Rosado 7 Asts: Rosado 7		Pts: Ferrari 16; Rebs: Caraves 9 Asts: Ferrari 5

Estadio Obras Sanitarias, Buenos Aires
Referees: Leandro Lezcano (ARG), Andrés Bartel (URU), Andreia Silva (BRA)

9 August 2017
13:35

Boxscore

Paraguay	73–67 (OT)	Mexico
Scoring by quarter: 17–16, 13–12, 11–14, 22–21, Overtime: 10–4
Pts: Ferrari 30; Rebs: Caraves 7 Asts: three players 4		Pts: Luna 25; Rebs: Núñez 18; Asts: Luna 4

Estadio Obras Sanitarias, Buenos Aires
Referees: Leandro Lezcano (ARG), Kendell Henry (ISV), Virginia Peruchini (ARG)

9 August 2017
18:35

Boxscore

Cuba	67–70	Puerto Rico
Scoring by quarter: 15–17, 12–26, 20–17, 20–10
Pts: Galindo 20; Rebs: three players 8 Asts: Casanova 8		Pts: Rosado 17; Rebs: Meléndez 8 Asts: four players 4

Estadio Obras Sanitarias, Buenos Aires
Referees: Leonardo Zalazar (ARG), Rodrigo Mejía (COL), Andreia Silva (BRA)

10 August 2017
13:35

Boxscore

Canada	86–64	Paraguay
Scoring by quarter: 26–14, 15–23, 25–14, 20–13
Pts: Fields 25; Rebs: Plouffe 13; Asts: Nurse, Scott 3		Pts: Ferrari 14; Rebs: Mercado 5 Asts: Mercado, Peralta 3

Estadio Obras Sanitarias, Buenos Aires
Referees: Leandro Lezcano (ARG), Kendell Henry (ISV), Andreia Silva (BRA)

10 August 2017
16:05

Boxscore

Mexico	51–62	Cuba
Scoring by quarter: 11–12, 14–11, 9–22, 17–17
Pts: Luna, Saad 11; Rebs: Núñez 11; Asts: Luna 5		Pts: Casanova 16; Rebs: Ochoa, Galindo 7 Asts: Casanova 9

Estadio Obras Sanitarias, Buenos Aires
Referees: Leonardo Zalazar (ARG), Rodrigo Mejía (COL), Virginia Peruchini (ARG)

== Knockout stage ==
=== Bracket ===
Semifinals
12 August
Argentina	48
Puerto Rico	44
12 August
Canada	84
Brazil	45

Final
13 August
Argentina	65
Canada	67
Third place
13 August
Puerto Rico	75
Brazil	68

=== Semifinals ===
12 August 2017
18:35

Boxscore

Canada	84–45	Brazil
Scoring by quarter: 24–12, 17–10, 26–10, 17–13
Pts: Nurse, Fields 16; Rebs: Hamblin 9 Asts: Langlois 9		Pts: Macedo 14; Rebs: Santos, L. Rodrigues 6 Asts: J. Rodrigues 4

Estadio Obras Sanitarias, Buenos Aires
Referees: Roberto Vázquez (PUR), Alejandra Gaytán (MEX), Virginia Peruchini (ARG)

12 August 2017
21:05

Boxscore

Argentina	48–44	Puerto Rico
Scoring by quarter: 13–4, 9–14, 13–9, 13–17
Pts: Burani 26; Rebs: Burani 12; Asts: Santana 4		Pts: Gibson 10; Rebs: Jones 12; Asts: Salaman 2

Estadio Obras Sanitarias, Buenos Aires
Referees: Gina Cross (USA), Andrés Bartel (URU), Yuliet Méndez (CUB)

=== Third place game ===
13 August 2017
19:05

Boxscore

Puerto Rico	75–68	Brazil
Scoring by quarter: 15–20, 15–10, 20–18, 25–20
Pts: Gibson 19; Rebs: Jones 6 Asts: González, Jones 4		Pts: Santos 20; Rebs: Santos 9 Asts: Macedo 6

Estadio Obras Sanitarias, Buenos Aires
Referees: Leandro Lezcano (ARG), Gina Cross (USA), Maripier Malo (CAN)

=== Final ===
13 August 2017
21:35

Boxscore

Argentina	65–67	Canada
Scoring by quarter: 18–14, 16–13, 13–29, 18–11
Pts: Gretter 23; Rebs: three players 5 Asts: Gretter 4		Pts: Nurse 12; Rebs: Plouffe 11; Asts: Langlois 4

Estadio Obras Sanitarias, Buenos Aires
Referees: Roberto Vázquez (PUR), Yuliet Méndez (CUB), Andreia Silva (BRA)

== Final standing ==
Qualified for 2018 FIBA Women's Basketball World Cup

Rank	Team	Record
1st place, gold medalist(s)	Canada	6–0
2nd place, silver medalist(s)	Argentina	5–1
3rd place, bronze medalist(s)	Puerto Rico	4–2
4	Brazil	2–4
5	Virgin Islands	2–2
6	Paraguay	2–2
7	Colombia	2–2
8	Cuba	1–3
9	Venezuela	0–4
10	Mexico	0–4

== Statistics and awards ==
=== Statistical leaders ===
Points

Name	PPG
(Paraguay) Paola Ferrari	21.8
(United States Virgin Islands) Imani Tate	19.8
(Canada) Nirra Fields	14.5
(United States Virgin Islands) Natalie Day	13.8
(Mexico) Jacqueline Luna	13.5
(Venezuela) Daniela Wallen	13.5

Rebounds

Name	RPG
(United States Virgin Islands) Natalie Day	10.5
(Mexico) Laura Núñez	10.0
(Mexico) Jacqueline Luna	9.5
(Cuba) Fransy Ochoa	8.5
(Argentina) Agostina Burani	7.8
(Cuba) Leidys Oquendo	7.8

Assists

Name	APG
(Cuba) Ineidis Casanova	7.8
(Venezuela) Ivaney Márquez	5.0
(Canada) Miah-Marie Langlois	4.7
(Paraguay) Paola Ferrari	3.8
(Argentina) Melisa Gretter	3.5
(Puerto Rico) Pamela Rosado	3.5

Blocks

Name	BPG
(Mexico) Laura Nuñez	2.3
(Mexico) Jacqueline Luna	1.5
(Brazil) Kelly Santos	1.2
(Argentina) Agostina Burani	1.0
(Canada) Miranda Ayim	1.0
(Canada) Ruth Hamblin	1.0

Steals

Name	SPG
(Cuba) Ineidis Casanova	4.8
(Venezuela) Daniela Wallen	3.8
(Paraguay) María Caraves	3.0
(Venezuela) Waleska Pérez	2.7
(Cuba) Anisleidy Galindo	2.5
(Cuba) Jenifer Muñoz	2.5

=== Awards ===
Most Valuable Player

- (Canada) Nirra Fields

All-Tournament Team

- (Argentina) Melisa Gretter
- (Canada) Nirra Fields
- (Puerto Rico) Allison Gibson
- (Paraguay) Paola Ferrari
- (Canada) Miranda Ayim
