= Basketball at the 2015 Pan American Games – Women's team rosters =

This article shows the rosters of all participating teams at the women's basketball tournament at the 2015 Pan American Games in Toronto. Rosters can have a maximum of 12 athletes.

== Argentina ==
The Argentina women's national basketball team roster for the 2015 Pan American Games.

Argentina women's national basketball team – 2015 Pan American Games roster
Players
Coaches

| Pos. | No. | Name | Age – Date of birth | Height | Club |
|---|---|---|---|---|---|
| F | 4 | Rosset, Macarena | 24 – Feb 23, 1991 | 1.76 m (5 ft 9 in) | (Argentina) Peñarol |
| C | 5 | Santana, Ornella | 24 – Sep 17, 1990 | 1.80 m (5 ft 11 in) | (Argentina) Berazategui |
| F | 6 | Reggiardo, Paula | 30 – Aug 31, 1984 | 1.73 m (5 ft 8 in) | (Argentina) Obras Sanitarias |
| C | 7 | Cabrera, Diana | 21 – Aug 7, 1993 | 1.84 m (6 ft 0 in) | (Argentina) Union Florida |
| F | 8 | Boquete, Andrea | 24 – Sep 24, 1990 | 1.80 m (5 ft 11 in) | (Argentina) Berazategui |
| C | 9 | Fiorotto, Celia | 23 – Jun 2, 1992 | 1.84 m (6 ft 0 in) | (Argentina) Union Florida |
| C | 10 | Burani, Agostina | 23 – Oct 4, 1991 | 1.85 m (6 ft 1 in) | (Argentina) Union Florida |
| G | 11 | Gretter, Melisa | 22 – Jan 24, 1993 | 1.60 m (5 ft 3 in) | (Argentina) Union Florida |
| G | 12 | Pavón, Sandra | 30 – Jun 1, 1985 | 1.72 m (5 ft 8 in) | (Argentina) Velez Sarsfield |
| G | 13 | González, Débora | 25 – Jan 10, 1990 | 1.65 m (5 ft 5 in) | (Italy) Virtus Eirene Ragusa |
| F | 14 | Thomas, Sthefany | 26 – May 4, 1989 | 1.75 m (5 ft 9 in) | (Brazil) Jaraguá |
| C | 15 | Vega, Gisela | 33 – Mar 14, 1982 | 1.89 m (6 ft 2 in) | (Argentina) Union Florida |

Head coach

- Cristian Santander

Assistant coach(es)

- Sebastian Silva

Legend

- Age – as of 15 July 2015
- Club – before start of Games

== Brazil ==
The Brazil national team roster for the women's basketball tournament of the 2015 Pan American Games. The final 12 player squad was announced on May 25, 2015.

Brazil women's national basketball team – 2015 Pan American Games roster
Players
Coaches

| Pos. | No. | Name | Age – Date of birth | Height | Club |
|---|---|---|---|---|---|
| G/F | 4 | Sangalli, Izabella | 20 – Mar 31, 1995 | 1.79 m (5 ft 10 in) | (Brazil) ADCF Unimed Americana |
| G | 5 | Costa, Débora | 23 – Aug 12, 1991 | 1.63 m (5 ft 4 in) | (Brazil) Uninassau America BK |
| G | 6 | Carcavalli, Tássia | 23 – May 31, 1992 | 1.77 m (5 ft 10 in) | (Brazil) BK Santo Andre |
| G | 7 | Teixeira, Patrícia | 24 – Sep 28, 1990 | 1.75 m (5 ft 9 in) | (Brazil) São José Desportivo |
| G | 8 | Paixão, Tainá | 23 – Nov 29, 1991 | 1.71 m (5 ft 7 in) | (Brazil) Uninassau America BK |
| G | 9 | de Paula, Jaqueline | 29 – Feb 17, 1986 | 1.76 m (5 ft 9 in) | (Brazil) BK Santo Andre |
| C | 10 | Justino, Gilmara | 34 – Mar 13, 1981 | 1.82 m (6 ft 0 in) | (Brazil) ADCF Unimed Americana |
| G | 11 | Martins, Carina | 23 – Feb 17, 1992 | 1.70 m (5 ft 7 in) | (Brazil) ADC São Bernardo |
| F | 12 | Jacob, Karina | 30 – May 24, 1985 | 1.84 m (6 ft 0 in) | (Brazil) São José Desportivo |
| F | 13 | Caetano, Fabiana | 24 – Jan 18, 1991 | 1.92 m (6 ft 4 in) | (Brazil) Uninassau America BK |
| F | 14 | Macedo, Isabela | 21 – Jan 23, 1994 | 1.76 m (5 ft 9 in) | (Brazil) São José Desportivo |
| C | 15 | Santos, Kelly | 35 – Nov 10, 1979 | 1.91 m (6 ft 3 in) | (Brazil) Sport Club do Recife |

Head coach

- Luiz Augusto Zanon

Assistant coach(es)

- Julio Cesar Patricio
- Cristiano Cedra

Legend

- Age – as of 15 July 2015
- Club – before start of Games

== Canada ==
The Canada national team roster for the women's basketball tournament of the 2015 Pan American Games. Canada announced their squad on June 22, 2015.

Canada women's national basketball team – 2015 Pan American Games roster
Players
Coaches

| Pos. | No. | Name | Age – Date of birth | Height | Club |
|---|---|---|---|---|---|
| G | 4 | Langlois, Miah-Marie | 23 – Sep 21, 1991 | 1.72 m (5 ft 8 in) | (Russia) Dynamo GUVD |
| G | 5 | Nurse, Kia | 19 – Feb 22, 1996 | 1.82 m (6 ft 0 in) | (United States) Connecticut Huskies |
| G | 6 | Thorburn, Shona | 32 – Aug 7, 1982 | 1.78 m (5 ft 10 in) | (France) Nantes Rezé Basket |
| F | 7 | Raincock-Ekwune, Nayo | 23 – Aug 29, 1991 | 1.88 m (6 ft 2 in) | (Germany) TSV 1880 Wasserburg |
| F | 8 | Gaucher, Kim | 31 – May 7, 1984 | 1.82 m (6 ft 0 in) | (France) USO Mondeville |
| F | 9 | Ayim, Miranda | 27 – May 6, 1988 | 1.88 m (6 ft 2 in) | (France) Basket Landes |
| G | 10 | Fields, Nirra | 21 – Dec 3, 1993 | 1.75 m (5 ft 9 in) | (United States) UCLA Bruins |
| C | 11 | Achonwa, Natalie | 22 – Nov 22, 1992 | 1.92 m (6 ft 4 in) | (United States) Indiana Fever |
| F | 12 | Murphy, Lizanne | 31 – Mar 15, 1984 | 1.84 m (6 ft 0 in) | (France) Union Féminine Angers Basket 49 |
| F | 13 | Tatham, Tamara | 29 – Aug 19, 1985 | 1.85 m (6 ft 1 in) | (Slovakia) Piestanske Cajky |
| C | 14 | Plouffe, Katherine | 22 – Sep 15, 1992 | 1.90 m (6 ft 3 in) | (France) Nantes Rezé Basket |
| F | 15 | Plouffe, Michelle | 22 – Sep 15, 1992 | 1.91 m (6 ft 3 in) | (France) USO Mondeville |

Head coach

- Lisa Thomaidis

Assistant coach(es)

- Shawnee Harle
- Bev Smith

Legend

- Age – as of 15 July 2015
- Club – before start of Games

== Cuba ==
The Cuba women's national basketball team roster for the 2015 Pan American Games.

Cuba women's national basketball team – 2015 Pan American Games roster
Players
Coaches

| Pos. | No. | Name | Age – Date of birth | Height | Club |
|---|---|---|---|---|---|
| F | 4 | Ochoa, Fransy | 24 – 13 Sep 1990 | 1.84 m (6 ft 0 in) | (Cuba) Villa Clara |
| G | 5 | Casanova, Ineidis | 26 – 13 Oct 1988 | 1.68 m (5 ft 6 in) | Santiago de Cuba |
| F | 6 | Galindo, Anisleidy | 26 – 29 Jan 1989 | 1.80 m (5 ft 11 in) | (Cuba) Pinar del Rio |
| G | 7 | Gelis, Oyanaisy | 31 – 21 Oct 1983 | 1.72 m (5 ft 8 in) | (Cuba) Habana |
| G | 8 | Romero, Arlenys | 31 – 7 Feb 1984 | 1.76 m (5 ft 9 in) | (Cuba) Pinar del Rio |
| F | 9 | Amargo, Yamara | 30 – 28 Jun 1985 | 1.77 m (5 ft 10 in) | (Cuba) Sancti Spiritus |
| F | 10 | Povea, Arlety | 30 – 7 Oct 1984 | 1.86 m (6 ft 1 in) | (Cuba) Pinar del Rio |
| C | 11 | Cepeda, Marlene | 29 – 27 Oct 1985 | 1.85 m (6 ft 1 in) | Santiago de Cuba |
| F | 12 | Noblet, Clenia | 28 – 6 May 1987 | 1.84 m (6 ft 0 in) | (Cuba) Guantanamo |
| C | 13 | Aties, Zuleira | 34 – 9 Oct 1980 | 1.91 m (6 ft 3 in) | (Cuba) Habana |
| F | 14 | Oquendo, Leidys | 32 – 23 Jul 1982 | 1.77 m (5 ft 10 in) | (Cuba) Camaguey |
| F | 15 | Avila, Suchitel | 32 – 1 Sep 1982 | 1.83 m (6 ft 0 in) | (Cuba) Habana |

Head coach

- Zabala, Alberto

Assistant coach(es)

- Moya, Eduardo

Legend

- Age – as of 15 July 2015
- Club – before start of Games

== Dominican Republic ==
The Dominican Republic women's national basketball team roster for the 2015 Pan American Games.

Dominican Republic women's national basketball team – 2015 Pan American Games roster
Players
Coaches

| Pos. | No. | Name | Age – Date of birth | Height | Club |
|---|---|---|---|---|---|
| PG | 4 | Guzman, Carmen | 29 – 16 Jul 1985 | 1.79 m (5 ft 10 in) |
| SG | 5 | Zapata, Julady | 22 – 23 Jun 1993 | 1.75 m (5 ft 9 in) |
| C | 6 | Estrella, Jennifer | 27 – 3 Dec 1987 | 1.82 m (6 ft 0 in) |
| F | 7 | Paniagua, Andreina | 36 – 7 Sep 1978 | 1.82 m (6 ft 0 in) |
| PG | 8 | Abreu, Yamel | 19 – 23 Aug 1995 | 1.73 m (5 ft 8 in) |
| G | 9 | Evangelista, Genesis | 22 – 25 Feb 1993 | 1.73 m (5 ft 8 in) |
| F | 10 | Beltre Paredes, Viviana Yisel | 20 – 2 Apr 1995 | 1.77 m (5 ft 10 in) |
| C | 11 | Soto Nuñez, Marian Ines | 23 – 2 Oct 1991 | 1.86 m (6 ft 1 in) |
| F | 12 | Rodríguez, Yamile | 20 – 14 Oct 1994 | 1.88 m (6 ft 2 in) |
| G | 13 | Peguero, Gisell | 23 – 14 Apr 1992 | 1.67 m (5 ft 6 in) |
| C | 14 | Andújar, Danilsa | 24 – 23 Oct 1990 | 1.88 m (6 ft 2 in) |
| C | 15 | Monsac, Sugeiry | 34 – 26 Feb 1981 | 1.89 m (6 ft 2 in) |

Head coach

- Ariel Portuondo

Legend

- Age – as of 15 July 2015
- Club – before start of Games

== Puerto Rico ==
The Puerto Rico women's national basketball team roster for the 2015 Pan American Games.

Puerto Rico women's national basketball team – 2015 Pan American Games roster
Players
Coaches

| Pos. | No. | Name | Age – Date of birth | Height | Club |
|---|---|---|---|---|---|
| G | 5 | Delgado, Yashira | 22 – 23 Jul 1992 | 1.65 m (5 ft 5 in) |
| SG | 6 | Sepúlveda, Jazmine | 30 – 10 Apr 1985 | 1.72 m (5 ft 8 in) |
| C | 7 | Bermúdez, Angelica | 26 – 2 Jul 1989 | 1.87 m (6 ft 2 in) |
| SG | 8 | Cortijo, Carla | 27 – 21 Jul 1987 | 1.70 m (5 ft 7 in) |
| SG | 9 | Gibson, Allison | 22 – 27 Mar 1993 | 1.52 m (5 ft 0 in) |
| F | 10 | Meléndez, Tayra | 21 – 29 Oct 1993 | 1.80 m (5 ft 11 in) |
| C | 11 | García, Sandra | 24 – 7 Aug 1990 | 1.87 m (6 ft 2 in) |
| G | 13 | Diaz Hassan, Natalie | 21 – 28 Apr 1994 | 1.72 m (5 ft 8 in) |
| F | 14 | Plácido, Marie | 27 – 18 Aug 1987 | 1.70 m (5 ft 7 in) |
| PF | 21 | Roma, Sofia Laura | 18 – 21 Nov 1996 | 1.88 m (6 ft 2 in) |
| F | 23 | Vargas, Yoy Ling | 23 – 26 Sep 1991 | 1.83 m (6 ft 0 in) |
| G | 32 | Martínez, Damika | 23 – 7 Jun 1992 | 1.52 m (5 ft 0 in) |

Head coach

- Omar Gonzalez

Legend

- Age – as of 15 July 2015
- Club – before start of Games

== United States ==
The following is the United States roster in the women's basketball tournament of the 2015 Pan American Games.

United States women's national basketball team - 2015 Pan American Games roster
Players
Coaches

| Pos. | No. | Name | Age – Date of birth | Height | Club |
|---|---|---|---|---|---|---|
| G | 4 | Moriah Jefferson | 21 – March 8, 1994 | 1.70 m (5 ft 7 in) | Connecticut Huskies | (United States) |
| G | 5 | Tiffany Mitchell | 20 – September 23, 1994 | 1.75 m (5 ft 9 in) | South Carolina Camecocks | (United States) |
| G | 6 | Linnae Harper | 20 – January 31, 1995 | 1.73 m (5 ft 8 in) | Kentucky Wildcats | (United States) |
| G | 7 | Kelsey Plum | 20 – August 24, 1994 | 1.73 m (5 ft 8 in) | Washington Huskies | (United States) |
| G | 8 | Caroline Coyer | 21 – October 27, 1993 | 1.78 m (5 ft 10 in) | Villanova Wildcats | (United States) |
| G | 9 | Shatori Walker-Kimbrough | 20 – May 18, 1995 | 1.81 m (5 ft 11 in) | Maryland Terrapins | (United States) |
| G | 10 | Breanna Stewart | 20 – August 27, 1994 | 1.93 m (6 ft 4 in) | Connecticut Huskies | (United States) |
| G | 11 | Courtney Williams | 21 – March 24, 1994 | 1.86 m (6 ft 1 in) | Texas A&M Aggies | (United States) |
| F | 12 | Stephanie Mavunga | 20 – February 24, 1995 | 1.91 m (6 ft 3 in) | North Carolina Tar Heels | (United States) |
| F | 13 | Taya Reimer | 19 – August 24, 1995 | 1.91 m (6 ft 3 in) | Notre Dame Fighting Irish | (United States) |
| F | 14 | Sophie Brunner | 19 – August 30, 1995 | 1.85 m (6 ft 1 in) | Arizona State Sun Devils | (United States) |
| C | 15 | Alaina Coates | 20 – April 7, 1995 | 1.95 m (6 ft 5 in) | South Carolina Camecocks | (United States) |

Head coach

- Lisa Bluder

Assistant coach(es)

- Michelle Clark-Heard
- Scott Rueck

Legend

- Club – describes last
  club before the tournament
- Age – describes age
  on 15 July 2015

== Venezuela ==
The Venezuela women's national basketball team roster for the 2015 Pan American Games.

Venezuela women's national basketball team – 2015 Pan American Games roster
Players
Coaches

| Pos. | No. | Name | Age – Date of birth | Height | Club |
|---|---|---|---|---|---|
| F | 4 | Landaeta, Mayerling | 22 – 25 Jan 1993 | 1.82 m (6 ft 0 in) |
| G | 5 | Silva, Roselis | 23 – 1 Aug 1991 | 1.65 m (5 ft 5 in) |
| SF | 6 | Corrales, Yosimar | 25 – 5 Feb 1990 | 1.80 m (5 ft 11 in) |
| C | 7 | García, Ana | 32 – 24 Nov 1982 | 1.92 m (6 ft 4 in) |
| SF | 8 | Márquez, Ivaney | 32 – 17 Mar 1983 | 1.79 m (5 ft 10 in) |
| SF | 9 | Wallen, Daniela | 20 – 4 Apr 1995 | 1.77 m (5 ft 10 in) |
| F | 10 | Ortega, Lusiana | 25 – 22 Sep 1989 | 1.73 m (5 ft 8 in) |
| PG | 11 | Durán, Mariana | 22 – 12 May 1993 | 1.68 m (5 ft 6 in) |
| F | 12 | Blanco Piñango, Cleyder Oderlin | 25 – 12 Jan 1990 | 1.83 m (6 ft 0 in) |
| PF | 13 | Garate, Marielka | 20 – 7 Feb 1995 | 1.83 m (6 ft 0 in) |
| PG | 14 | Pérez, Waleska | 21 – 17 Feb 1994 | 1.79 m (5 ft 10 in) |
| F | 32 | Polanco Áñez, Cynthia Maria | 29 – 20 Nov 1985 | 1.83 m (6 ft 0 in) |

Head coach

- Óscar Silva

Legend

- Age – as of 15 July 2015
- Club – before start of Games
