= 2021 Centrobasket Women =

Women's basketball tournament

2021 FIBA Women's Centrobasket
22nd Women's Central American and Caribbean Basketball Championship

Tournament details
- Host country: El Salvador
- City: San Salvador
- Dates: 24–28 March
- Teams: 5 (from 1 confederation)
- Venue: 1 (in 1 host city)

Final positions
- Champions: Puerto Rico (3rd title)
- Runners-up: Virgin Islands
- Third place: Dominican Republic

Tournament statistics
- MVP: (Puerto Rico) Pamela Rosado
- Top scorer: (United States Virgin Islands) Anisha George (20.0)
- Top rebounds: (United States Virgin Islands) Anisha George (13.3)
- Top assists: (United States Virgin Islands) Imani Tate (9.0)
- PPG (Team): Puerto Rico (81.5)
- RPG (Team): Virgin Islands (55.8)
- APG (Team): Puerto Rico (19.8)

Official website
- www.fiba.basketball

The 2021 Centrobasket Women was the 22nd edition of the women's Centrobasket. The tournament was held in the city of San Salvador, El Salvador, from 24 to 28 March 2021. Puerto Rico won their third overall title.

Originally, six teams were about to feature but Cuba withdrew because of the COVID-19 pandemic.

The top four teams qualified for the 2021 FIBA Women's AmeriCup.

== Final standings ==
Pos	Team	Pld	W	L	PF	PA	PD	Pts	Qualification
1st place, gold medalist(s)	Puerto Rico	4	4	0	326	231	+95	8	2021 FIBA Women's AmeriCup
2nd place, silver medalist(s)	Virgin Islands	4	3	1	311	268	+43	7	2021 FIBA Women's AmeriCup
3rd place, bronze medalist(s)	Dominican Republic	4	2	2	316	301	+15	6	2021 FIBA Women's AmeriCup
4	El Salvador	4	1	3	243	316	−73	5	2021 FIBA Women's AmeriCup
5	Costa Rica	4	0	4	232	312	−80	4	

Source: FIBA
Rules for classification: 1) points; 2) head-to-head points; 3) head-to-head points difference; 4) head-to-head number of points scored.

== Match results ==
All times are local (Central Standard Time – UTC-6).

24 March 2021
16:00

Boxscore

Puerto Rico	73–69	Virgin Islands
Scoring by quarter: 21–19, 12–20, 17–13, 23–17
Pts: Rosado 18; Rebs: Lozada-Cabbage 10; Asts: Rosado 8		Pts: George 30; Rebs: George 15; Asts: Tate 9

Gimnasio Nacional José Adolfo Pineda, San Salvador
Referees: Julio Anaya (PAN), Mario Granados (SLV), Shandera Gardiner (BAH)

24 March 2021
19:00

Boxscore

Costa Rica	79–84	El Salvador
Scoring by quarter: 15–24, 22–21, 16–21, 26–18
Pts: Betancourt 29; Rebs: Quesada 8 Asts: Alvarado 6		Pts: Funes 22; Rebs: Villalobos 11; Asts: Funes 5

Gimnasio Nacional José Adolfo Pineda, San Salvador
Referees: Ricardo Hayles (JAM), Natalia Cuello (DOM), Carol García (COL)

25 March 2021
16:00

Boxscore

Virgin Islands	81–51	Costa Rica
Scoring by quarter: 18–20, 26–9, 14–6, 23–16
Pts: Jones 25; Rebs: George 12; Asts: Tate 7		Pts: Gálvez 12; Rebs: Betancourt 6 Asts: Alvarado 3

Gimnasio Nacional José Adolfo Pineda, San Salvador
Referees: Natalia Cuello (DOM), Rebeca Davila (PUR), Shandera Gardiner (BAH)

25 March 2021
19:00

Boxscore

Dominican Republic	90–99	Puerto Rico
Scoring by quarter: 17–25, 23–21, 24–24, 26–29
Pts: Colomé 25; Rebs: Monsac 10; Asts: Evangelista, Morton 5		Pts: Stinson 25; Rebs: Lozada-Cabbage 6 Asts: Rosado 11

Gimnasio Nacional José Adolfo Pineda, San Salvador
Referees: Julio Anaya (PAN), Mauricio Chinchilla (CRC), Carol García (COL)

26 March 2021
16:00

Boxscore

Dominican Republic	76–81	Virgin Islands
Scoring by quarter: 29–23, 17–19, 20–22, 10–17
Pts: Colomé 17; Rebs: Jiménez 6 Asts: Morton 5		Pts: Tate 20; Rebs: Tate 14; Asts: Tate 12

Gimnasio Nacional José Adolfo Pineda, San Salvador
Referees: Ricardo Hayles (JAM), Mario Granados (SLV), Rebeca Davila (PUR)

26 March 2021
19:00

Boxscore

El Salvador	33–75	Puerto Rico
Scoring by quarter: 9–14, 10–24, 6–28, 8–9
Pts: Cubias 10; Rebs: Villalobos 8 Asts: Méndez 3		Pts: Stinson 14; Rebs: González 10; Asts: four players 2

Gimnasio Nacional José Adolfo Pineda, San Salvador
Referees: Julio Anaya (PAN), Natalia Cuello (DOM), Mauricio Chinchilla (PUR)

27 March 2021
16:00

Boxscore

Costa Rica	39–79	Puerto Rico
Scoring by quarter: 17–23, 9–23, 11–20, 2–13
Pts: Quesada 10; Rebs: Jiménez, Mora 6 Asts: Alvarado, Jiménez 2		Pts: Quiñones 17; Rebs: Quiñones 10; Asts: Stinson 4

Gimnasio Nacional José Adolfo Pineda, San Salvador

27 March 2021
19:00

Boxscore

Dominican Republic	82–58	El Salvador
Scoring by quarter: 19–13, 21–13, 21–14, 21–18
Pts: Morton 15; Rebs: Rodríguez 9 Asts: Evangelista 4		Pts: Funes 16; Rebs: Villalobos 14; Asts: Funes, Villalobos 3

Gimnasio Nacional José Adolfo Pineda, San Salvador

28 March 2021
16:00

Boxscore

Costa Rica	63–68	Dominican Republic
Scoring by quarter: 12–20, 15–19, 16–16, 20–13
Pts: Gálvez 17; Rebs: Mora 8 Asts: Betancourt 6		Pts: Morton 22; Rebs: Evangelista 8 Asts: Colomé 3

Gimnasio Nacional José Adolfo Pineda, San Salvador

28 March 2021
19:00

Boxscore

El Salvador	68–80	Virgin Islands
Scoring by quarter: 23–23, 10–21, 22–20, 13–16
Pts: Tévez 25; Rebs: Villalobos 12; Asts: Méndez 4		Pts: George 22; Rebs: George 14; Asts: Tate 8

Gimnasio Nacional José Adolfo Pineda, San Salvador

== Awards ==
The MVP and all-star team was announced on 29 March 2021.

All-Star Team
Guards	Center
(Dominican Republic) Elemy Colomé (United States Virgin Islands) Imani Tate (Puerto Rico) Pamela Rosado (Puerto Rico) Jada Stinson	(United States Virgin Islands) Anisha George
MVP: (Puerto Rico) Pamela Rosado
