= Universidad Modelo =

Private university in Mérida, Yucatán, Mexico

Coordinates: 21.0285°N 89.5678°W

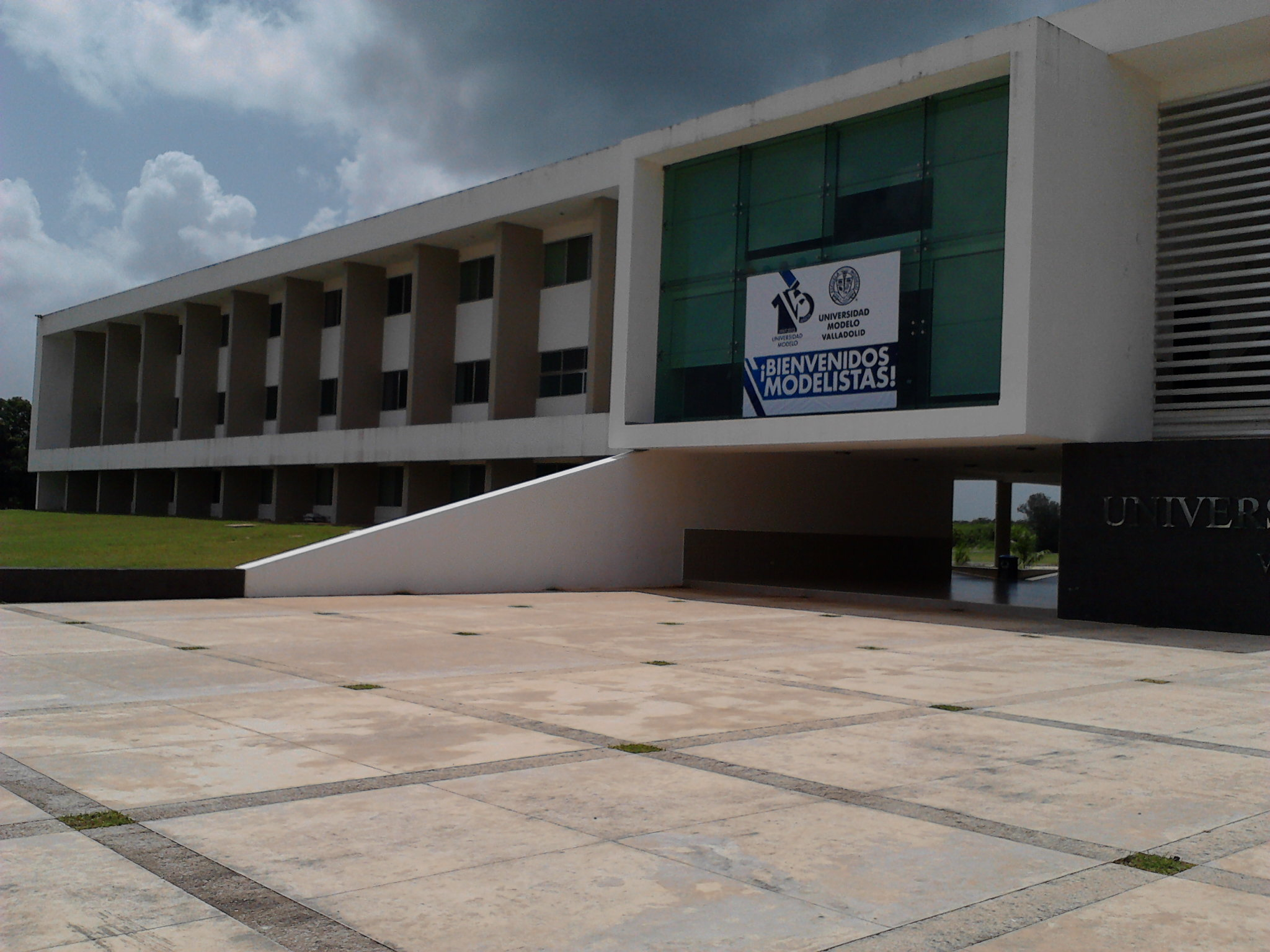
- Motto: Para sí, para todos
- Motto in English: For one's self, for everyone
- Type: Private
- Established: September 1, 1997; 28 years ago
- Founders: Gonzalo Cámara Zavala
- Rector: Carlos Sauri Duch
- Location: Mérida, Yucatán, Mexico
- Colors: Blue and White
- Website: www.unimodelo.edu.mx

The Universidad Modelo is a private institution of higher education in Yucatán, Mexico, with its central campus located in Mérida. It offers 27 courses at the undergraduate level, 22 postgraduate Master's degrees, 19 diplomas and 3 specialization courses. The university also has campuses in Chetumal and Valladolid.

== History ==
The institution was originally founded on 18 May 1910 as "Escuela Modelo" and inaugurated on 15 September of the same year by the president of the "Liga de Acción Social", Gonzalo Cámara Zavala. Gonzalo's project was inspired by Rousseau's Emile, or On Education, searching for an education close to nature, open spaces and green areas, a first on Mérida. Founded as one of the first primary education schools of Yucatán, the Escuela Modelo slowly grew to cover secondary and higher education on 1933 and 1962, respectively.

In 1912, American lawyer Henry Ralph Rindge introduced baseball to the institution education. Through the Escuela Modelo, Rindge also introduced basketball to Yucatán. The institution (and later the University's) logo was also designed by Henry Rindge. On 1941, the Escuela Modelo became the first mixed-sex School in Yucatán.

The university was founded in 1997, following the humanitarian philosophies of its predecessor.

In 2016, on the eve of the school's anniversary, the Universidad Modelo opened a building for its faculty of health sciences.

On 8 November 2019, the university premiered "Los días de otoño", a film written, filmed and edited by students of Communication.

In 2021, the Universidad Modelo opened a building for its engineering school.

== Campuses ==
The Universidad Modelo contains two campuses in Yucatán and one in Quintana Roo.

=== Mérida Campus ===
- Business School
- Law School
- Design school
- School of Humanities
- School of Architecture
- School of Health
- Engineering school

=== Valladolid Campus ===
- Business School
- School of Health
- School of Architecture
- School of Humanities
- Law School
- Design school

=== Chetumal Campus ===
- School of Health
- Law School
- School of Humanities
- Design school
- Business School

== Accreditation ==
The university has national and international accreditations from various institutions.

- ANDPADEH: Acreditación Nacional de Programas de Arquitectura y Disciplinas del Espacio Habitable
- CACEI: Council for Accreditation of Engineering Education
- CNEIP: Consejo Nacional para la Enseñanza e Investigación en Psicología
- CONAC: Consejo de Acreditación de la Comunicación y las Ciencias Sociales

== International relations ==
The Universidad Modelo offers to their students various opportunities of academic exchange to educational institutions outside of Mexico. The following institutions currently offer academic exchange programs with the Universidad Modelo: University of Seville, University of the Basque Country, University of Insubria, Pontificia Universidad Católica de Paraná, Universidad Ramón Llull, and Pompeu Fabra University.

== See also ==
- Education in Mexico
