= Han Eom-ji =

South Korean basketball player

No. 2 – Incheon Shinhan Bank S-Birds
- Position: Forward
- League: WKBL

Personal information
- Born: November 10, 1998 (age 28) Sacheon, South Gyeongsang

Career information
- Playing career: 2017–present

Career history
- 2017–present: Incheon Shinhan Bank S-Birds

- Han Eom-ji
- Hangul: 한엄지
- RR: Han Eomji
- MR: Han Ŏmji

Han Eom-ji (Korean: 한엄지; born November 10, 1998) is a South Korean professional basketball forward currently playing for the Incheon Shinhan Bank S-Birds of the Women's Korean Basketball League. She competed in the 2020 Summer Olympics.
