= Joice Rodrigues =

Brazilian basketball player (born 1986)

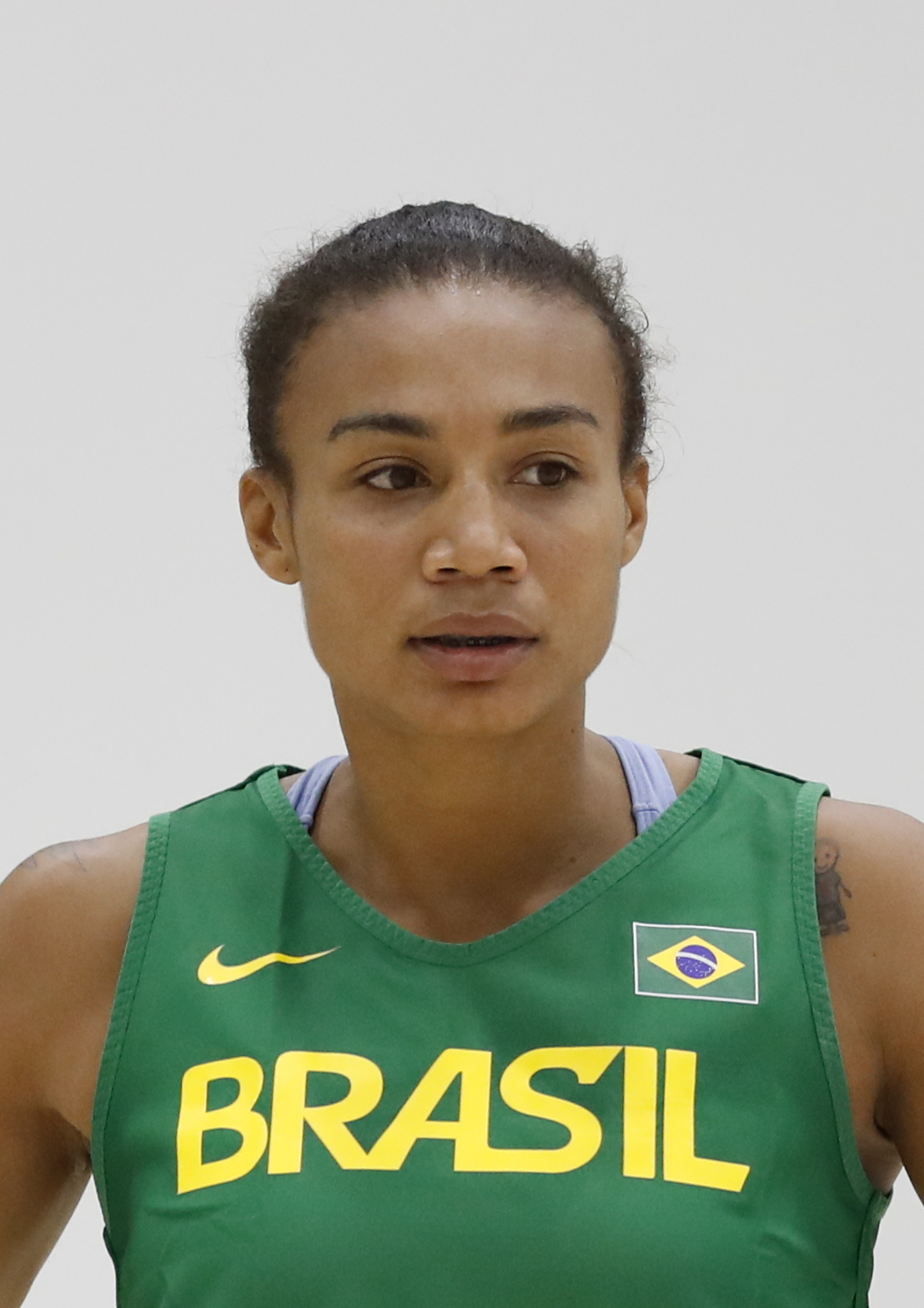

Corinthians/Americana
- Position: Point guard
- League: LBF

Personal information
- Born: September 6, 1986 (age 38); Bauru, Brazil
- Listed height: 5 ft 6 in (1.68 m)

Joice Cristina de Souza Rodrigues (born September 6, 1986) is a Brazilian female basketball player. At the 2012 Summer Olympics, she competed for the Brazil women's national basketball team in the women's event. She is 5 ft 9 in (1.75 m) tall.
