= Jada Stinson =

Puerto Rican basketball player

No. 0 – Illinois State Redbirds
- Position: Guard
- League: MVC

Personal information
- Born: September 28, 1999 (age 27) Fayetteville, North Carolina, U.S.
- Listed height: 5 ft 8 in (1.73 m)

Career information
- High school: Elizabethtown (Elizabethtown, Kentucky)
- College: Memphis (2017–2019); Arkansas State (2020–2021); Illinois State (2021–present)
Medals
Women's basketball
Representing Puerto Rico
FIBA Women's AmeriCup
Silver medal – second place	2021 San Juan
Centrobasket
Gold medal – first place	2021 San Salvador

Jada Shanice Stinson (born September 28, 1999) is a Puerto Rican basketball player.

Stinson plays for the Puerto Rican national team. She participated at the 2021 Centrobasket Women's Championship. Stinson played for the Puerto Rican team at the 2020 Tokyo Olympics for the team's debut Olympics appearance.

== Life ==
Stinson is a native of Fayetteville, North Carolina. She attended Elizabethtown High School in Elizabethtown, Kentucky.

She plays college basketball for the Illinois State Redbirds. She previously played for the Memphis Tigers and Arkansas State Red Wolves.
