= Celia Fiorotto =

Argentine basketball player

No. 9 – Quimsa
- Position: Power forward
- League: LNB

Personal information
- Born: 2 June 1992 (age 33); Entre Rios, Argentina
- Listed height: 6 ft 1 in (1.85 m)
- Listed weight: 172 lb (78 kg)

Career information
- WNBA draft: 2014: undrafted

Celia Noemi Fiorotto (born 2 June 1992) is an Argentine basketball player for Quimsa and the Argentina women's national basketball team.

She defended Argentina at the 2018 FIBA Women's Basketball World Cup.
