= Sabrina Lozada-Cabbage =

American basketball player (born 1997)

Personal information
- National team: Puerto Rico
- Born: January 3, 1997 (age 29)
- Home town: Santa Fe, New Mexico
- Education: Wichita State University
- Height: 187 cm (74 in)

Sport
- Sport: Women's basketball
- University team: Wichita State Shockers

Sabrina Lozada-Cabbage (born January 3, 1997) is an American women's basketball player. She played for the Wichita State Shockers women's basketball team and also represented Puerto Rico at the 2020 Summer Olympics.

Lozada-Cabbage was born in Santa Fe, New Mexico to two deaf parents. As a result, she grew up with American Sign Language as her first language. She began signing at six months old. She graduated from Santa Fe High School in 2015.

She attended Wichita State University and played on their women's basketball team from 2015 to 2019. She averaged 8.6 points and 6.0 rebounds as a senior. Because her maternal grandparents were born in Puerto Rico, Lozada-Cabbage qualified to play for the Puerto Rico women's basketball team in the 2020 Summer Olympics women's basketball tournament. The team placed twelfth in the tournament.

Lozada-Cabbage has a degree in sports management. She is LGBTQ.
