= Marie Plácido =

Puerto Rican basketball player

No. 14 – Cangrejeras de Santurce
- Position: Forward
- League: BSN

Personal information
- Born: August 18, 1987 (age 39) Ponce, Puerto Rico
- Listed height: 6 ft 0 in (1.83 m)

Career information
- WNBA draft: 2009: undrafted
Medals
Women's basketball
Representing Puerto Rico
Central American and Caribbean Games
Bronze medal – third place	2018 Barranquilla	Team

Marie Plácido Morales (Note: In this Spanish name, the first or paternal surname is Plácido and the second or maternal family name is Morales.) (born August 18, 1987), also known as Mari Plácido, is a Puerto Rican basketball player for Cangrejeras de Santurce and the Puerto Rican national team.

She participated in the 2018 FIBA Women's Basketball World Cup.
