= Allison Gibson =

Puerto Rican basketball player

No. 9 – Santeras de Aguada
- Position: Shooting guard
- League: BSN

Personal information
- Born: March 27, 1993 (age 33) Stockton, California, United States
- Listed height: 5 ft 11 in (1.80 m)

Career information
- College: Oregon State (2011–2015)
- WNBA draft: 2015: undrafted
Medals
Women's basketball
Representing Puerto Rico
FIBA AmeriCup
Silver medal – second place	2021 San Juan
Bronze medal – third place	2017 Buenos Aires
Pan American Games
Bronze medal – third place	2019 Lima	Team
Central American and Caribbean Games
Bronze medal – third place	2018 Barranquilla	Team

Allison Gibson (born March 27, 1993) is an American basketball player for the Puerto Rican national team.

== Career ==
Ali played NCAA college basketball for Oregon State from 2011 to 2015.

She made the All-star Team for the 2017 FIBA Women's AmeriCup where the Puerto Rican Nation team won a bronze medal and secured a bid to the 2018 FIBA Women's Basketball World Cup.

== Oregon State statistics ==
Legend
GP	Games played	GS	Games started	MPG	Minutes per game
FG%	Field goal percentage	3P%	3-point field goal percentage	FT%	Free throw percentage
RPG	Rebounds per game	APG	Assists per game	SPG	Steals per game
BPG	Blocks per game	PPG	Points per game	**Bold**	Career high

Year	Team	GP	Points	FG%	3P%	FT%	RPG	APG	SPG	BPG	PPG
2011–12	Oregon State	33	**387**	41.6%	**34.8%**	**76.8%**	3.8	2.3	**2.0**	0.4	**11.7**
2012–13	Oregon State	31	282	35.6%	27.6%	62.5%	**4.1**	1.9	1.7	**0.4**	9.1
2013–14	Oregon State	**35**	316	**42.3%**	33.3%	63.9%	3.3	1.9	1.4	0.2	9.0
2014–15	Oregon State	32	277	40.6%	34.5%	60.4%	2.9	**2.4**	1.3	0.3	8.7
Career		131	1262	40.0%	32.5%	66.4%	3.5	2.1	1.6	0.3	9.6
