= Macarena Rosset =

Argentine basketball player

No. 4 – San Giovanni Valdarno
- Position: Shooting guard
- League: A1

Personal information
- Born: 23 February 1991 (age 34); Buenos Aires, Argentina
- Listed height: 5 ft 10 in (1.78 m)
- Listed weight: 150 lb (68 kg)

Career information
- WNBA draft: 2013: undrafted

Macarena Rosset (born 23 February 1991) is an Argentine basketball player for San Giovanni Valdarno and the Argentina women's national basketball team.

She defended Argentina at the 2018 FIBA Women's Basketball World Cup.
