= Michelle González (basketball) =

Puerto Rican basketball player

No. 91 – Cangrejeras de santurce
- Position: Guard
- League: BSN

Personal information
- Born: August 3, 1989 (age 37) San Juan, Puerto Rico
- Listed height: 5 ft 6 in (1.68 m)

Career information
- College: FIU (2011)
- WNBA draft: 2011: undrafted
Medals
Women's basketball
Representing Puerto Rico
FIBA AmeriCup
| Silver medal – second place | 2021 San Juan |
Pan American Games
| Gold medal – first place | 2011 Guadalajara | Team |
Central American and Caribbean Games
| Bronze medal – third place | 2018 Barranquilla | Team |

Michelle González (born August 3, 1989) is a Puerto Rican Professional basketball player for Cangrejeras de Santurce and for the Puerto Rican national team. She participated at the 2018 FIBA Women's Basketball World Cup.

== Florida International statistics ==
Legend
| GP | Games played | GS | Games started | MPG | Minutes per game |
| FG% | Field goal percentage | 3P% | 3-point field goal percentage | FT% | Free throw percentage |
| RPG | Rebounds per game | APG | Assists per game | SPG | Steals per game |
| BPG | Blocks per game | PPG | Points per game | **Bold** | Career high |

| Year | Team | GP | Points | FG% | 3P% | FT% | RPG | APG | SPG | BPG | PPG |
|---|---|---|---|---|---|---|---|---|---|---|---|
| 2008-09 | Florida International | 30 | 279 | 34.2% | 32.6% | 73.3% | 2.6 | **4.1** | 2.1 | **0.3** | 9.3 |
| 2009-10 | Florida International | 30 | **352** | **35.2%** | 31.7% | 75.8% | 2.4 | 3.4 | 2.0 | 0.1 | **11.7** |
| 2010-11 | Florida International | **32** | 351 | 30.8% | **34.8%** | **81.9%** | **3.1** | 4.1 | **2.3** | 0.1 | 11.0 |
| Career | | 92 | 982 | 33.4% | 33.1% | 78.1% | 2.7 | 3.9 | 2.1 | 0.1 | 10.7 |
