= Pamela Rosado =

Puerto Rican basketball player

No. 3 – Montañeras de Morovis
- Position: Point guard
- League: BSN

Personal information
- Born: April 30, 1986 (age 40) Arecibo, Puerto Rico
- Listed height: 5 ft 5 in (1.65 m)

Career information
- WNBA draft: 2008: undrafted
- Coaching career: 2021–present

Career history

Coaching
- 2021–present: Puerto Rico U16

Career highlights
- Centrobasket MVP (2021)
Medals
Women's basketball
Representing Puerto Rico
FIBA AmeriCup
Silver medal – second place	2021 San Juan
Pan American Games
Gold medal – first place	2011 Guadalajara	Team
Bronze medal – third place	2019 Lima	Team
Central American and Caribbean Games
Gold medal – first place	2010 Mayagüez	Team
Silver medal – second place	2006 Cartagena	Team
Bronze medal – third place	2018 Barranquilla	Team
Bronze medal – third place	2023 San Salvador	Team

Pamela Zoe Rosado Román (Note: In this Spanish name, the first or paternal surname is Rosado and the second or maternal family name is Román.) (born April 30, 1986) is a Puerto Rican basketball player for Montañeras de Morovis and the Puerto Rican national team.

She participated at the 2018 FIBA Women's Basketball World Cup. and at the 2020 Summer Olympic Games, which were held in 2021 because of the COVID-19 pandemic in 2020.
