= Basketball at the 2019 Pan American Games – Women's team rosters =

This article shows the rosters of all participating teams at the women's basketball tournament at the 2019 Pan American Games in Lima, Peru.

== Argentina ==
Argentina women's basketball team roster
Players
Coaches

Pos.	No.	Name	Age – Date of birth	Height	Club	Ctr.
G/F	7	Julieta Ale	23 – 29 September 1995	1.68 m (5 ft 6 in)	Vélez Sarsfield	(Argentina)
G/F	8	Andrea Boquete	28 – 24 September 1990	1.80 m (5 ft 11 in)	Obras Sanitarias	(Argentina)
C	10	Agostina Burani	27 – 4 October 1991	1.85 m (6 ft 1 in)	Obras Sanitarias	(Argentina)
G	5	Macarena D'Urso	27 – 16 December 1991	1.70 m (5 ft 7 in)	CB Almería	(Spain)
C	9	Celia Fiorotto	27 – 2 June 1992	1.84 m (6 ft 0 in)	Quimsa	(Argentina)
G/F	13	Débora González (C)	29 – 10 January 1990	1.66 m (5 ft 5 in)	Dike Napoli	(Italy)
G	11	Melisa Gretter	26 – 24 January 1993	1.65 m (5 ft 5 in)	Vera Cruz Campinas	(Brazil)
F	6	Victoria Llorente	23 – 5 June 1996	1.84 m (6 ft 0 in)	Gernika KESB	(Spain)
C	15	Mara Marchizotti	25 – 16 June 1994	1.92 m (6 ft 4 in)	CB Adareva Tenerife	(Spain)
F/C	19	Julieta Mungo	22 – 6 August 1997	1.91 m (6 ft 3 in)	Quimsa	(Argentina)
F	22	Natacha Pérez	28 – 30 March 1991	1.80 m (5 ft 11 in)	Deportivo Berazategui	(Argentina)
F/C	12	Ornella Santana	28 – 17 September 1990	1.83 m (6 ft 0 in)	CB Almería	(Spain)

Head coach

- (Argentina) Leonardo Costa

Assistant coach(es)

- (Argentina) Juan Pablo Boadaz

Legend

- (C) Team captain
- Club – describes current club
- Age – describes age
  on 6 August 2019

== Brazil ==
Brazil women's basketball team roster
Players
Coaches

Pos.	No.	Name	Age – Date of birth	Height	Club	Ctr.
SG	3	Isabela Lyra	25 – 23 January 1994	1.80 m (5 ft 11 in)	Uninassau Basquette	(Brazil)
SF	5	Raphaella Monteiro	24 – 28 January 1995	1.81 m (5 ft 11 in)	Sampaio Basquete	(Brazil)
SG	7	Patrícia Teixeira	28 – 28 September 1990	1.80 m (5 ft 11 in)	Vera Cruz Campinas	(Brazil)
PG	8	Tainá Paixão	27 – 29 November 1991	1.73 m (5 ft 8 in)	Sampaio Basquete	(Brazil)
PG	9	Lays da Silva	20 – 11 September 1998	1.65 m (5 ft 5 in)	Basquete Blumenau	(Brazil)
SF	10	Tatiane Pacheco	28 – 16 October 1990	1.81 m (5 ft 11 in)	Sampaio Basquete	(Brazil)
PF	11	Clarissa dos Santos (C)	31 – 10 March 1988	1.86 m (6 ft 1 in)	Sampaio Basquete	(Brazil)
PF	12	Aline Cezário	22 – 4 July 1997	1.85 m (6 ft 1 in)	SESI Araraquara	(Brazil)
C	14	Érika de Souza	37 – 9 March 1982	1.96 m (6 ft 5 in)	Uninassau Basquette	(Brazil)
PG	18	Débora Costa	27 – 12 August 1991	1.64 m (5 ft 5 in)	SESI Araraquara	(Brazil)
C	24	Stephanie Soares	19 – 17 April 2000	1.98 m (6 ft 6 in)	The Master's University	(United States)
SG	77	Izabella Sangalli	24 – 31 March 1995	1.82 m (6 ft 0 in)	Ituano Basquete	(Brazil)

Head coach

- (Brazil) José Neto

Assistant coach(es)

- (Brazil) Virgil Lopez

Legend

- (C) Team captain
- Club – describes current club
- Age – describes age
  on 6 August 2019

== Canada ==
Canada women's basketball team roster
Players
Coaches

Pos.	No.	Name	Age – Date of birth	Height	Club	Ctr.
G/F	4	Samantha Hill	24 – 22 November 1994	1.77 m (5 ft 10 in)	WWK Donau-Ries Nördlingen	(Germany)
G	5	Shaina Pellington	20 – 1 June 1999	1.70 m (5 ft 7 in)	University of Arizona	(United States)
G/F	6	Aislinn Konig	21 – 20 May 1998	1.75 m (5 ft 9 in)	North Carolina State University	(United States)
F	7	Alyssa Jerome	19 – 1 December 1999	1.91 m (6 ft 3 in)	Stanford University	(United States)
F	8	Hailey Brown	20 – 16 June 1999	1.85 m (6 ft 1 in)	University of Michigan	(United States)
G	9	Cassandra Nofuente	25 – 24 October 1993	1.70 m (5 ft 7 in)	SISU Copenhagen	(Denmark)
G	10	Hanna Hall	20 – 17 March 1999	1.60 m (5 ft 3 in)	University at Buffalo	(United States)
F	11	Alexandria Kiss-Rusk	25 – 27 December 1993	1.94 m (6 ft 4 in)	BC Marburg	(Germany)
G/F	12	Jamie Scott (C)	24 – 9 August 1994	1.75 m (5 ft 9 in)	Dynamo Novosibirsk	(Russia)
G/F	13	Cassandra Brown	27 – 16 June 1992	1.88 m (6 ft 2 in)	Dafni Agioy	(Greece)
C	14	Ruth Hamblin	25 – 24 June 1994	1.99 m (6 ft 6 in)	BC Castors Braine	(Belgium)
C	15	Emily Potter	23 – 10 October 1995	1.96 m (6 ft 5 in)	Gdańsk University of Technology	(Poland)

Head coach

- (Canada) Steve Baur

Assistant coach(es)

- (Canada) Joseph McKenzie

Legend

- (C) Team captain
- Club – describes current club
- Age – describes age
  on 6 August 2019

== Colombia ==
Colombia women's basketball team roster
Players
Coaches

Pos.	No.	Name	Age – Date of birth	Height	Club	Ctr.
G	4	Manuela Ríos	22 – 25 January 1997	1.64 m (5 ft 5 in)
C	5	Diana Prens	23 – 6 September 1995	1.87 m (6 ft 2 in)
C	6	Yuliany Paz	19 – 20 June 2000	1.91 m (6 ft 3 in)
F	7	Mayra Caicedo	19 – 12 February 2000	1.58 m (5 ft 2 in)
G	8	Carolina López	20 – 18 August 1998	1.67 m (5 ft 6 in)
G	9	María Palacio	34 – 30 April 1985	1.67 m (5 ft 6 in)
F	10	Mabel Martínez	32 – 28 October 1986	1.75 m (5 ft 9 in)
C	11	Yanet Arias (C)	36 – 14 October 1982	1.81 m (5 ft 11 in)
F	12	Jenifer Muñoz	28 – 1 February 1991	1.75 m (5 ft 9 in)
C	14	Marlyn Venté	24 – 8 July 1995	1.84 m (6 ft 0 in)
C	15	Narlyn Mosquera	29 – 15 December 1989	1.94 m (6 ft 4 in)
F	17	María Álvarez	18 – 29 January 2001	1.73 m (5 ft 8 in)

Head coach

- (Colombia) Luis Miguel Cuenca

Assistant coach(es)

- (Colombia) Ricardo Pinzón

Legend

- (C) Team captain
- Club – describes current club
- Age – describes age
  on 6 August 2019

== Paraguay ==
Paraguay women's basketball team roster
Players
Coaches

Pos.	No.	Name	Age – Date of birth	Height	Club	Ctr.
G/F	3	Marta Peralta	25 – 16 July 1994	1.73 m (5 ft 8 in)
C	4	Ilda Peña	35 – 9 January 1984	1.80 m (5 ft 11 in)
G/F	5	Paola Ferrari (C)	33 – 16 September 1985	1.78 m (5 ft 10 in)
G	6	Melina Pérez	33 – 26 January 1986	1.65 m (5 ft 5 in)
F/C	7	Astrid Hutteman	27 – 4 April 1992	1.78 m (5 ft 10 in)
F	8	Natalia Quevedo	21 – 13 January 1998	1.75 m (5 ft 9 in)
C	9	Patricia Rojas	31 – 26 October 1987	1.75 m (5 ft 9 in)
F/C	10	Tamara Insfrán	30 – 26 July 1989	1.75 m (5 ft 9 in)
C	11	María Caraves	27 – 31 May 1992	1.74 m (5 ft 9 in)
F/C	12	Andrea Gómez	29 – 28 January 1990	1.73 m (5 ft 8 in)
F	13	Paloma Niz	20 – 18 January 1999	1.72 m (5 ft 8 in)
F/C	14	Ximena Ibarra	17 – 11 October 2001	1.72 m (5 ft 8 in)

Head coach

- (Paraguay) Juan Pablo Feliú

Assistant coach(es)

- (Paraguay) Alberto Cano

Legend

- (C) Team captain
- Club – describes current club
- Age – describes age
  on 6 August 2019

== Puerto Rico ==
Puerto Rico women's basketball team roster
Players
Coaches

Pos.	No.	Name	Age – Date of birth	Height	Club	Ctr.
G	0	Jennifer O'Neill	29 – 19 April 1990	1.68 m (5 ft 6 in)
F	2	Tayra Meléndez	25 – 29 October 1993	1.88 m (6 ft 2 in)
F	3	Anushka Maldonado	23 – 29 September 1995	1.88 m (6 ft 2 in)
G	5	Pamela Rosado (C)	33 – 30 April 1986	1.63 m (5 ft 4 in)
F	9	Allison Gibson	26 – 27 March 1993	1.80 m (5 ft 11 in)
C	11	Sofía Roma	22 – 21 November 1996	1.88 m (6 ft 2 in)
G	12	Dayshalee Salamán	29 – 17 March 1990	1.63 m (5 ft 4 in)
F	14	Gileysa Penzo	22 – 12 June 1997	1.84 m (6 ft 0 in)
F	20	Deanna Kuzmanic	22 – 11 September 1996	1.80 m (5 ft 11 in)
F	24	Jazmon Gwathmey	26 – 24 January 1993	1.88 m (6 ft 2 in)
C	25	Isalys Quiñones	21 – 23 October 1997	1.88 m (6 ft 2 in)
C	33	India Pagán	20 – 1 July 1999	1.88 m (6 ft 2 in)

Head coach

- (Puerto Rico) Jerry Batista

Assistant coach(es)

- (Puerto Rico) Ángel Pagán

Legend

- (C) Team captain
- Club – describes current club
- Age – describes age
  on 6 August 2019

== United States ==
United States women's basketball team roster
Players
Coaches

Pos.	No.	Name	Age – Date of birth	Height	Club	Ctr.
G	4	Kiana Williams	20 – 9 April 1999	1.73 m (5 ft 8 in)	Stanford University	(United States)
G	5	Taylor Mikesell	19 – 30 September 1999	1.80 m (5 ft 11 in)	University of Maryland	(United States)
G	6	Tyasha Harris	21 – 1 May 1998	1.78 m (5 ft 10 in)	University of South Carolina	(United States)
G	7	Kathleen Doyle	21 – 11 June 1998	1.75 m (5 ft 9 in)	University of Iowa	(United States)
G	8	Chennedy Carter	20 – 14 November 1998	1.70 m (5 ft 7 in)	Texas A&M University	(United States)
G	9	Mikayla Pivec	21 – 18 November 1997	1.78 m (5 ft 10 in)	Oregon State University	(United States)
F	10	Lindsey Pulliam	19 – 9 August 1999	1.78 m (5 ft 10 in)	Northwestern University	(United States)
F	11	Peyton Williams	21 – 27 April 1998	1.93 m (6 ft 4 in)	Kansas State University	(United States)
F	12	Beatrice Mompremier	22 – 8 August 1996	1.93 m (6 ft 4 in)	University of Miami	(United States)
C	13	Brittany Brewer	21 – 6 November 1997	1.96 m (6 ft 5 in)	Texas Tech University	(United States)
F	14	Bella Alarie	21 – 23 April 1998	1.96 m (6 ft 5 in)	Princeton University	(United States)
F	15	Michaela Onyenwere	19 – 10 August 1999	1.83 m (6 ft 0 in)	UCLA	(United States)

Head coach

- (United States) Suzy Merchant

Assistant coach(es)

- (United States) Victor Schaefer

Legend

- (C) Team captain
- Club – describes current club
- Age – describes age
  on 6 August 2019

== Virgin Islands ==
U.S. Virgin Islands women's basketball team roster
Players
Coaches

Pos.	No.	Name	Age – Date of birth	Height	Club	Ctr.
F	2	Breyanna Roberts	17 – 14 September 2001	1.76 m (5 ft 9 in)
G	4	Brittney Matthew	26 – 8 July 1993	1.70 m (5 ft 7 in)
G	5	Tanecka Carey	28 – 17 August 1990	1.80 m (5 ft 11 in)
G	6	Kadesha Barry	24 – 26 July 1995	1.73 m (5 ft 8 in)
F	7	Natalie Day	29 – 23 July 1990	1.82 m (6 ft 0 in)
G	8	Sedeja Fieulleteau	17 – 6 November 2001	1.76 m (5 ft 9 in)
G	9	Lanese Bough (C)	25 – 7 December 1993	1.79 m (5 ft 10 in)
G/F	10	Victoria Hamilton	28 – 8 July 1991	1.55 m (5 ft 1 in)
F	11	Cheyenne Hedrington	26 – 10 May 1993	1.55 m (5 ft 1 in)
G	12	Imani Tate	24 – 12 July 1995	1.80 m (5 ft 11 in)
F/C	14	Anisha George	21 – 26 May 1998	1.89 m (6 ft 2 in)

Head coach

- (Puerto Rico) William Colón

Assistant coach(es)

- (United States) Clint Williams

Legend

- (C) Team captain
- Club – describes current club
- Age – describes age
  on 6 August 2019
