= 2019 FIBA Women's AmeriCup squads =

This article displays the rosters for the teams competing at the 2019 FIBA Women's AmeriCup. Each team had to submit 12 players.

Age and club as of 22 September 2019.

== Group A ==
=== Canada ===
A 16-player squad was announced on 8 September 2019.

Canada women's national basketball team roster
Players
Coaches

Pos.	No.	Name	Age – Date of birth	Height	Club	Ctr.
G	4	Sami Hill	24 – 22 November 1994	1.78 m (5 ft 10 in)	BG Donau-Ries	(Germany)
G	6	Bridget Carleton	22 – 22 May 1997	1.85 m (6 ft 1 in)	Townsville Fire	(Australia)
F	7	Nayo Raincock-Ekunwe	27 – 15 September 1992	1.88 m (6 ft 2 in)	Nadezhda Orenburg	(Russia)
G	8	Kim Gaucher	35 – 7 May 1984	1.86 m (6 ft 1 in)	USO Mondeville	(France)
F	9	Miranda Ayim	31 – 6 May 1988	1.91 m (6 ft 3 in)	Basket Landes	(France)
G	10	Miah-Marie Langlois	28 – 21 September 1991	1.72 m (5 ft 8 in)	Dynamo Novosibirsk	(Russia)
G	12	Jamie Scott	25 – 9 August 1994	1.78 m (5 ft 10 in)	Dynamo Novosibirsk	(Russia)
G	13	Shay Colley	23 – 6 January 1996	1.76 m (5 ft 9 in)	Michigan State Spartans	(United States)
C	14	Kayla Alexander	28 – 5 January 1991	1.93 m (6 ft 4 in)	Çukurova Basketbol	(Turkey)
F	15	Aaliyah Edwards	17 – 9 July 2002	1.91 m (6 ft 3 in)	Crestwood Preparatory College	(United States)
C	22	Ruth Hamblin	25 – 24 June 1994	1.99 m (6 ft 6 in)	Dynamo Novosibirsk	(Russia)
F	23	Quinn Dornstauder	24 – 16 August 1995	1.93 m (6 ft 4 in)	CD Zamarat	(Spain)

Head coach

- (Canada) Lisa Thomaidis

Assistant coach(es)

- (Canada) Steve Baur
- (Canada) Carly Clarke

Legend

- Club – describes last
  club before the tournament
- Age – describes age
  on 22 September 2019

=== Cuba ===
Cuba women's national basketball team roster
Players
Coaches

Pos.	No.	Name	Age – Date of birth	Height	Club	Ctr.
G	0	Anilegna Colas	24 – 15 February 1995	1.60 m (5 ft 3 in)	Capitalinos de La Habana	(Cuba)
G	2	Lisdeyvi Martínez	30 – 23 September 1988	1.75 m (5 ft 9 in)	Capitalinos de La Habana	(Cuba)
SG	3	Lisandra Vargas	23 – 15 September 1996	1.78 m (5 ft 10 in)	Ciego de Ávila	(Cuba)
G	9	Yamara Amargo	34 – 28 June 1985	1.80 m (5 ft 11 in)	Santi Espiritu	(Cuba)
C	10	Anay García	25 – 27 April 1994	1.90 m (6 ft 3 in)	Pinar del Río	(Cuba)
PF	15	Suchitel Ávila	37 – 1 September 1982	1.83 m (6 ft 0 in)	Capitalinos de La Habana	(Cuba)
PF	17	Isabela Jourdain	15 – 28 November 2003	1.88 m (6 ft 2 in)	Capitalinos de La Habana	(Cuba)
C	20	Leanyi Becquer	22 – 15 January 1997	1.95 m (6 ft 5 in)	Capitalinos de La Habana	(Cuba)
F	21	Klavdia Calvo	36 – 5 March 1983	1.85 m (6 ft 1 in)	Mexico City Aztecas	(Mexico)
G	55	Dairis Tornell	27 – 18 April 1992	1.76 m (5 ft 9 in)	Capitalinos de La Habana	(Cuba)
G	56	Anisleidy Galindo	30 – 29 January 1989	1.80 m (5 ft 11 in)	Pinar del Río	(Cuba)
C	80	Enriqueta Neyra	22 – 3 January 1997	1.87 m (6 ft 2 in)	Santi Espiritu	(Cuba)

Head coach

- (Cuba) Margarito Pedroso

Legend

- Club – describes last
  club before the tournament
- Age – describes age
  on 22 September 2019

=== Dominican Republic ===
Dominican Republic women's national basketball team roster
Players
Coaches

Pos.	No.	Name	Age – Date of birth	Height	Club	Ctr.
G	1	Cheisy Hernández	25 – 12 September 1994	1.67 m (5 ft 6 in)	Club San Làzaro	(Dominican Republic)
SF	2	María Marte	29 – 28 August 1990	1.83 m (6 ft 0 in)	Club Deportivo Yeyeo	(Dominican Republic)
G	4	Julady Zapata	26 – 23 June 1993	1.65 m (5 ft 5 in)	Club del Sur	(Dominican Republic)
G	5	Yohanna Morton	31 – 12 December 1987	1.55 m (5 ft 1 in)	Club De Hostos	(Dominican Republic)
F	6	Jennifer Estrella	32 – 3 December 1986	1.82 m (6 ft 0 in)	Club Dosa	(Dominican Republic)
G	7	Genesis Evangelista	26 – 25 February 1993	1.80 m (5 ft 11 in)	Mauricio Báez BC	(Dominican Republic)
G	8	Charlenny Frias	34 – 5 November 1984	1.70 m (5 ft 7 in)	Club Los Mina	(Dominican Republic)
PF	9	Marlem Cáceres	30 – 29 December 1988	1.79 m (5 ft 10 in)	Club Dosa	(Dominican Republic)
PG	10	Nicole Guerrero	22 – 16 June 1997	1.61 m (5 ft 3 in)	Club Calero	(Dominican Republic)
F	12	Flor Jones	21 – 5 May 1998	1.84 m (6 ft 0 in)	Club San Làzaro	(Dominican Republic)
C	13	Giocelis Reynoso	23 – 11 December 1995	1.90 m (6 ft 3 in)	Club Calero	(Dominican Republic)
C	15	Sugeiry Monsac	38 – 26 February 1981	1.85 m (6 ft 1 in)	Águilas de Guachupita	(Dominican Republic)

Head coach

- (Dominican Republic) Juana Durán

Assistant coach(es)

- (Dominican Republic) Miguel Reyes
- (Dominican Republic) Eudys Reynoso

Legend

- Club – describes last
  club before the tournament
- Age – describes age
  on 22 September 2019

=== Mexico ===
Mexico women's national basketball team roster
Players
Coaches

Pos.	No.	Name	Age – Date of birth	Height	Club	Ctr.
PF	3	Daniela Soto	23 – 4 December 1995	1.78 m (5 ft 10 in)	Aztecas CDMX	(Mexico)
PG	4	Daniela Pardo	25 – 16 July 1994	1.60 m (5 ft 3 in)	Aztecas CDMX	(Mexico)
C	5	Jacqueline Luna-Castro	26 – 22 January 1993	1.90 m (6 ft 3 in)	Cangrejeros	(Puerto Rico)
F	6	Gladys Ávila	24 – 27 November 1994	1.77 m (5 ft 10 in)	Aztecas CDMX	(Mexico)
PG	8	Paola Beltran	25 – 8 August 1994	1.64 m (5 ft 5 in)	Mexcaltecas de Nayarit	(Mexico)
SG	9	Jacqueline Ramírez	24 – 25 March 1995	1.63 m (5 ft 4 in)	UANL	(Mexico)
PF	10	Irlanda Castañeda	21 – 6 February 1998	1.87 m (6 ft 2 in)	UACJ	(Mexico)
SG	11	Casandra Asencio	28 – 15 January 1991	1.69 m (5 ft 7 in)	Gamos CDMX	(Mexico)
SG	12	Paola Estrada	26 – 11 January 1993	1.72 m (5 ft 8 in)	Mineras de Zacatecas	(Mexico)
C	13	Carolina Romo	25 – 19 October 1993	1.85 m (6 ft 1 in)	Mexcaltecas de Nayarit	(Mexico)
PF	14	Jazmin Valenzuela	30 – 7 March 1989	1.87 m (6 ft 2 in)	Mexcaltecas de Nayarit	(Mexico)
SF	50	Kimberly Taylor	22 – 15 February 1997	1.81 m (5 ft 11 in)	TEC de Monterrey	(Mexico)

Head coach

- (Mexico) Tomas Rafael Canizalez Moreno

Assistant coach(es)

- (Mexico) Jesus Aragon Vazquez
- (Mexico) Felipe De Jesus Terrazas Arredondo

Legend

- Club – describes last
  club before the tournament
- Age – describes age
  on 22 September 2019

=== Puerto Rico ===
Puerto Rico women's national basketball team roster
Players
Coaches

Pos.	No.	Name	Age – Date of birth	Height	Club	Ctr.
PG	0	Jennifer O'Neill (C)	29 – April 19, 1990	5 ft 5 in (1.65 m)		(Russia)
F	2	Tayra Meléndez	25 – October 29, 1993	5 ft 7 in (1.7 m)		(Puerto Rico)
G	3	Anushka Maldonado	23 – September 25, 1995	6 ft 1 in (1.85 m)		(Puerto Rico)
PG	5	Pamela Rosado	33 – April 30, 1986	5 ft 5 in (1.65 m)		(Puerto Rico)
SG	9	Allison Gibson	26 – March 27, 1993	6 ft 3 in (1.91 m)		(Puerto Rico)
PF	11	Sofía Roma	22 – November 21, 1996	6 ft 2 in (1.88 m)		(Puerto Rico)
G	12	Dayshalee Salamán	29 – August 17, 1990	5 ft 5 in (1.65 m)		(Puerto Rico)
G	20	Deanna Kuzmanic	23 – September 11, 1996	5 ft 9 in (1.75 m)		(Puerto Rico)
G	22	Daneishka Canales	22 – June 12, 1997	5 ft 11 in (1.8 m)		(Puerto Rico)
SG	24	Jazmon Gwathmey	26 – January 24, 1993	6 ft 2 in (1.88 m)		(Spain)
PF	25	Isalys Quiñones	21 – October 23, 1997	6 ft 3 in (1.91 m)	Dartmouth Big Green	(United States)
C	33	India Pagán	20 – January 7, 1999	6 ft 2 in (1.88 m)	Stony Brook Seawolves	(United States)

Head coach

- (Puerto Rico) Jerry Batista

Legend

- (C) Team captain
- Club field describes current or most recent club
- Age – describes age
  on September 22, 2019

== Group B ==
=== Argentina ===
A 20-player squad was announced on 9 September 2019.

Argentina women's national basketball team roster
Players
Coaches

Pos.	No.	Name	Age – Date of birth	Height	Club	Ctr.
F	1	Luciana de La Barba	22 – 29 March 1997	1.67 m (5 ft 6 in)	Berazategui	(Argentina)
G	5	Macarena D'Urso	27 – 16 December 1991	1.62 m (5 ft 4 in)	CB Almeria	(Spain)
F	6	Victoria Llorente	23 – 5 June 1996	1.80 m (5 ft 11 in)	Vélez Sarsfield	(Argentina)
PG	7	Julieta Ale	23 – 29 September 1995	1.76 m (5 ft 9 in)	Vélez Sarsfield	(Argentina)
F	8	Andrea Boquete	28 – 24 September 1990	1.83 m (6 ft 0 in)	Berazategui	(Argentina)
F	9	Celia Fiorotto	27 – 2 June 1992	1.86 m (6 ft 1 in)	Berazategui	(Argentina)
C	10	Agostina Burani	27 – 4 October 1991	1.86 m (6 ft 1 in)	Lanús	(Argentina)
G	11	Melisa Gretter	26 – 24 January 1993	1.67 m (5 ft 6 in)	Union Florida	(Argentina)
G	13	Debora González	29 – 10 January 1990	1.70 m (5 ft 7 in)	Napoli	(Italy)
F	14	Sofia Aispurua	24 – 18 February 1995	1.90 m (6 ft 3 in)	Obras Sanitarias	(Spain)
C	15	Mara Marchizotti	25 – 16 June 1994	1.92 m (6 ft 4 in)	Rocamora	(Argentina)
G/F	22	Natacha Pérez	28 – 30 March 1991	1.76 m (5 ft 9 in)	Lanús	(Argentina)

Head coach

- (Argentina) Christian Santander

Assistant coach(es)

- (Argentina) Sebastian Silva
- (Argentina) Juan Ferreira Martinez

Legend

- Club – describes last
  club before the tournament
- Age – describes age
  on 22 September 2019

=== Brazil ===
A 18-player squad was announced on 26 August 2019.

Brazil women's national basketball team roster
Players
Coaches

Pos.	No.	Name	Age – Date of birth	Height	Club	Ctr.
SG	3	Isabela Ramona	25 – 23 January 1994	1.80 m (5 ft 11 in)	Uninassau	(Brazil)
SF	5	Rapha Monteiro	24 – 28 January 1995	1.81 m (5 ft 11 in)	Sampaio Basquete	(Brazil)
SG	7	Patrícia Teixeira	28 – 28 September 1990	1.75 m (5 ft 9 in)	Vera Cruz Campinas	(Brazil)
G	8	Tainá Paixão	27 – 29 November 1991	1.73 m (5 ft 8 in)	Sampaio Basquete	(Brazil)
SF	10	Tatiane Pacheco	28 – 16 October 1990	1.81 m (5 ft 11 in)	Sampaio Basquete	(Brazil)
PF	11	Clarissa dos Santos	31 – 10 March 1988	1.86 m (6 ft 1 in)	ASVEL Féminin	(France)
F	12	Damiris Dantas	26 – 17 November 1992	1.92 m (6 ft 4 in)	Minnesota Lynx	(United States)
C	14	Érika de Souza	37 – 9 March 1982	1.96 m (6 ft 5 in)	Perfumerias Avenida Salamanca	(Spain)
PG	18	Débora Costa	28 – 12 August 1991	1.64 m (5 ft 5 in)	Sesi Araraquara	(Brazil)
PG	23	Alana Gonçalo	24 – 23 September 1994	1.66 m (5 ft 5 in)	Basketball Santo André	(Brazil)
C	31	Nádia Colhado	30 – 25 February 1989	1.94 m (6 ft 4 in)	Carolo basket	(France)
PF	97	Mari Dias	21 – 12 October 1997	1.86 m (6 ft 1 in)	Vera Cruz Campinas	(Brazil)

Head coach

- (Brazil) José Neto

Assistant coach(es)

- (Brazil) João Camargo
- (Brazil) Virgil Lopez

Legend

- Club – describes last
  club before the tournament
- Age – describes age
  on 22 September 2019

=== Colombia ===
Colombia women's national basketball team roster
Players
Coaches

Pos.	No.	Name	Age – Date of birth	Height	Club	Ctr.
PG	4	Manuela Ríos	22 – 25 January 1997	1.65 m (5 ft 5 in)	Politécnico	(Mexico)
PF	5	Wendy Coy	21 – 17 February 1998	1.80 m (5 ft 11 in)	Guerreros de Bogotá	(Colombia)
C	6	Yuliany Paz	19 – 20 June 2000	1.97 m (6 ft 6 in)	Arrieros de Antioquia	(Colombia)
PG	7	Mayra Caicedo	19 – 12 January 2000	1.60 m (5 ft 3 in)	Northern New Mexico College	(United States)
PG	8	Carolina López	21 – 18 August 1998	1.65 m (5 ft 5 in)	Universidad de Medellin	(Colombia)
PG	9	María Palacio	34 – 30 April 1985	1.63 m (5 ft 4 in)	Club Panamericanos	(Colombia)
F	10	Mabel Martínez	32 – 28 October 1986	1.72 m (5 ft 8 in)	Quimsa	(Argentina)
PF	11	Yaneth Arias	36 – 14 October 1982	1.80 m (5 ft 11 in)	Copacabana de Antioquia	(Colombia)
SG	12	Jenifer Muñoz	28 – 1 February 1991	1.75 m (5 ft 9 in)	Universidad de Medellin	(Colombia)
C	14	Marlyn Venté	24 – 8 July 1995	1.80 m (5 ft 11 in)	Club Panamericanos	(Colombia)
PF	19	Daniela González	17 – 28 July 2002	1.80 m (5 ft 11 in)	Cali Valle	(Colombia)

Head coach

- (Colombia) Luis Miguel Cuenca

Assistant coach(es)

- (Colombia) Sandra Carvajal
- (Colombia) Ricardo Pinzon

Legend

- Club – describes last
  club before the tournament
- Age – describes age
  on 22 September 2019

=== Paraguay ===
Paraguay women's national basketball team roster
Players
Coaches

Pos.	No.	Name	Age – Date of birth	Height	Club	Ctr.
SG	3	Marta Peralta	25 – 16 July 1994	1.71 m (5 ft 7 in)	Unami Club Deportivo	(Spain)
C	4	Ilda Peña	35 – 9 January 1984	1.80 m (5 ft 11 in)	Club Félix Pérez	(Paraguay)
SF	5	Paola Ferrari	34 – 16 September 1985	1.78 m (5 ft 10 in)	Alter Enersun Al-Qázeres Extremadura	(Spain)
F	7	Astrid Hutteman	27 – 4 April 1992	1.78 m (5 ft 10 in)	Club Libertad	(Paraguay)
F	8	Natalia Quevedo	21 – 13 January 1998	1.70 m (5 ft 7 in)	Club Sol de América	(Paraguay)
C	9	Patricia Rojas	31 – 26 October 1987	1.83 m (6 ft 0 in)	Club Sol de América	(Paraguay)
G	10	Johanna Ghiringhelli	33 – 2 January 1986	1.67 m (5 ft 6 in)	Club Sol de América	(Paraguay)
G	11	María Caraves	27 – 31 May 1992	1.69 m (5 ft 7 in)	Club Sol de América	(Paraguay)
SF	12	Andrea Gómez	29 – 28 January 1990	1.78 m (5 ft 10 in)	Club Sol de América	(Paraguay)
F	13	Paloma Niz	20 – 18 January 1999	1.75 m (5 ft 9 in)	Club Libertad	(Paraguay)
G	14	Ximena Ibarra	17 – 11 October 2001	1.72 m (5 ft 8 in)	Club Félix Pérez	(Paraguay)
PG	20	María Pérez	20 – 23 January 1999	1.65 m (5 ft 5 in)	Club Libertad	(Paraguay)

Head coach

- (Paraguay) Juan Pablo Feliu

Assistant coach(es)

- (Paraguay) Andres Gustavo Gomez Argana
- (Paraguay) Christian Viveros

Legend

- Club – describes last
  club before the tournament
- Age – describes age
  on 22 September 2019

=== United States ===
The squad was announced on 19 September 2019.

United States women's national basketball team roster roster
Players
Coaches

Pos.	No.	Name	Age – Date of birth	Height	Club	Ctr.
C	13	Sylvia Fowles	33 – 6 October 1985	1.98 m (6 ft 6 in)	Minnesota Lynx	(United States)
C	14	Tina Charles	30 – 5 December 1988	1.93 m (6 ft 4 in)	New York Liberty	(United States)
G	20	Brittney Sykes	25 – 7 February 1994	1.75 m (5 ft 9 in)	Atlanta Dream	(United States)
G	21	Jordin Canada	24 – 11 August 1995	1.68 m (5 ft 6 in)	Seattle Storm	(United States)
F	22	Diamond DeShields	24 – 5 March 1995	1.85 m (6 ft 1 in)	Chicago Sky	(United States)
F	24	Napheesa Collier	22 – 23 September 1996	1.88 m (6 ft 2 in)	Minnesota Lynx	(United States)
F/C	30	Elizabeth Williams	26 – 23 June 1993	1.91 m (6 ft 3 in)	Atlanta Dream	(United States)
F/C	31	Stefanie Dolson	27 – 8 January 1992	1.96 m (6 ft 5 in)	Chicago Sky	(United States)
G/F	33	Katie Lou Samuelson	22 – 13 June 1997	1.91 m (6 ft 3 in)	Chicago Sky	(United States)
G	34	Arike Ogunbowale	22 – 2 March 1997	1.80 m (5 ft 11 in)	Dallas Wings	(United States)
G	41	Khadijah Sessions	25 – 2 November 1993	1.73 m (5 ft 8 in)	Kouvot	(Finland)
F	42	Olivia Nelson-Ododa	19 – 17 August 2000	1.96 m (6 ft 5 in)	UConn Huskies	(United States)

Head coach

- (United States) Dawn Staley

Assistant coach(es)

- (United States) Dan Hughes
- (United States) Cheryl Reeve

Legend

- Club – describes last
  club before the tournament
- Age – describes age
  on 22 September 2019
