= Basketball at the 2019 Pan American Games =

- Basketball pictogram
- Venue: Coliseo Eduardo Dibos
- Dates: July 27 – August 10, 2019
- Competitors: 240 from 12 nations

Basketball competitions at the 2019 Pan American Games in Lima, Peru began on July 27 and continue through August 10. The competitions are taking place at the Coliseo Eduardo Dibos.

This was the Pan American Games debut of 3x3 basketball for both men and women, bringing the total number of basketball events on the program to four. This was done after the International Olympic Committee added the events to the program of the 2020 Summer Olympics in Tokyo, Japan. A total of eight men's and eight women's teams (each consisting of up to twelve athletes) competed in each five-a-side tournament respectively, and six teams competed in each 3x3 tournament (with four athletes per team). This means a total of 240 athletes are scheduled to compete.

== Medal table ==
Rank	Nation	Gold	Silver	Bronze	Total
1	United States	2	1	1	4
2	Argentina	1	1	0	2
3	Brazil	1	0	0	1
4	Puerto Rico	0	2	1	3
5	Dominican Republic	0	0	2	2
Totals (5 entries)		4	4	4	12

== Medalists ==
Event	Gold	Silver	Bronze
Men's tournament	Argentina; Agustín Caffaro; Luca Vildoza; Luis Scola; Facundo Campazzo; Nicolás Laprovíttola; Nicolás Brussino; Máximo Fjellerup; Marcos Delía; Gabriel Deck; Lucio Redivo; Patricio Garino; Tayavek Gallizzi	Puerto Rico; Christian Pizarro; Joseph Soto; Devon Collier; Isaiah Manderson; Iván Gandía; Benito Santiago Jr. Justin Reyes; Emmanuel Ándujar; Isaac Sosa; Gilberto Clavell; Derek Reese; Christopher Brady	United States; Collin Gillespie; Andre Reeves; Willie Mack; Ty-Shon Alexander; Myles Cale; David Duke Jr. Mustapha Heron; Jermaine Samuels Jr. Myles Powell; Alpha Diallo; Tyler Wideman; Junathaen Watson; Geoffrey Groselle
Women's tournament	Brazil; Isabela Ramona; Raphaella Monteiro; Patrícia Teixeira; Tainá Paixão; Lays da Silva; Tatiane Pacheco; Clarissa dos Santos; Aline Cezário; Érika de Souza; Débora Costa; Stephanie Soares; Izabella Sangalli	United States; Kiana Williams; Taylor Mikesell; Tyasha Harris; Kathleen Doyle; Chennedy Carter; Mikayla Pivec; Lindsey Pulliam; Peyton Williams; Beatrice Mompremier; Brittany Brewer; Isabella Alarie; Michaela Onyenwere	Puerto Rico; Jennifer O'Neill; Tayra Meléndez; Anushka Maldonado; Pamela Rosado; Allison Gibson; Sofía Roma; Dayshalee Salamán; Gileysa Penzo; Deanna Kuzmanic; Jazmon Gwathmey; Isalys Quiñones; India Pagan
Men's 3x3 tournament	United States; Sheldon Jeter; Dominique Jones; Kareem Maddox; Jonathan Octeus	Puerto Rico; Gilberto Clavell; Josue Erazo; Tjader Fernández; Ángel Matías	Dominican Republic; Reyson Beato; Adonis Núñez; Bryan Piantini; Henry Valdez
Women's 3x3 tournament	United States; Ruth Hebard; Sabrina Ionescu; Olivia Nelson-Ododa; Christyn Williams	Argentina; Andrea Boquete; Melisa Gretter; Victoria Llorente; Natacha Pérez	Dominican Republic; Carolay Hernández; Sugeiry Monsac; Giocelis Reynoso; Nelsy Sentil

== Participating nations ==
A total of twelve countries qualified basketball teams. The number of athletes is in parentheses.

- Argentina (32 athletes)
- Brazil (20)
- Canada (12)
- Colombia (12)
- Dominican Republic (20)
- Mexico (12)
- Paraguay (12)
- Puerto Rico (28)
- United States (32)
- Uruguay (16)
- Venezuela (20)
- Virgin Islands (21)

== Qualification ==
A total of eight men's teams and eight women's teams qualified to compete at the games in the five-a-side tournaments. For the men's event, the top seven teams at the 2017 FIBA AmeriCup, have qualified to compete. In the women's event, the Olympic Champions the United States, have qualified to compete as well as the top six nations at the 2017 FIBA Women's AmeriCup. This is a new system of qualification implemented by FIBA Americas. For each 3x3 tournament, the top five teams in each gender in the world rankings as of November 1, 2018 qualified. Host nation Peru was barred from participating by FIBA, following sanctions imposed on the Peruvian Basketball Federation.

=== Men's five-a-side ===
Event	Date	Location	Vacancies	Qualified
Host Nation	—N/a	—N/a	~~1~~ 0	~~Peru~~
2017 FIBA AmeriCup	August 25 – September 3	Various	~~7~~ 8	United States; Argentina; Mexico; Virgin Islands; Puerto Rico; Uruguay; Dominican Republic; Venezuela
Total			8	

- Both the defending gold and silver medallists (Brazil and Canada respectively) failed to qualify.
- Peru was banned from the competition and was replaced with Venezuela. Canada as the next best team, declined the reallocated spot.

=== Women's five-a-side ===
Both Paraguay and the Virgin Islands qualified for the women's tournament for the first time.

Event	Date	Location	Vacancies	Qualified
Host Nation	—N/a	—N/a	~~1~~ 0	~~Peru~~
Olympic Champions	—N/a	—N/a	1	United States
2017 FIBA Women's AmeriCup	August 6–13	(Argentina) Buenos Aires	~~6~~ 7	Canada; Argentina; Puerto Rico; Brazil; Virgin Islands; Paraguay; Colombia
Total			8	

- Peru was barred from the competition and was replaced with the next best team not qualified, Colombia.

=== Men's 3x3 ===
Event	Date	Vacancies	Qualified
Host Nation	—N/a	~~1~~ 0	~~Peru~~
FIBA Rankings	November 1, 2018	6	United States; Brazil; Puerto Rico; Argentina; Dominican Republic; Venezuela
Total		6	

=== Women's 3x3 ===
Event	Date	Vacancies	Qualified
Host Nation	—N/a	~~1~~ 0	~~Peru~~
FIBA Rankings	November 1, 2018	6	Brazil; Venezuela; United States; Argentina; Uruguay; Dominican Republic
Total		6	

== See also ==
- Basketball at the 2020 Summer Olympics
