= 2009 FIBA Under-19 World Championship for Women =

- Official logo of the FIBA Under-19 World Championship for Women 2009

Tournament details
- Host country: Thailand
- City: Bangkok
- Dates: 23 July – 2 August
- Teams: 16 (from 5 confederations)
- Venue: 1 (in 1 host city)

Final positions
- Champions: United States (4th title)

Tournament statistics
- MVP: (Spain) Marta Xargay
- Top scorer: (Australia) Cambage (20.4)
- Top rebounds: (Mali) Coulibaly (11.5)
- Top assists: (China) Qiu (4.6)
- PPG (Team): United States (86.6)
- RPG (Team): United States (45.7)
- APG (Team): Australia(12.8)

Official website
- Official website

The 2009 FIBA Under-19 World Championship for Women (Thai: บาสเกตบอลหญิงชิงแชมป์โลกรุ่นอายุไม่เกิน 19 ปี 2009) was hosted by Thailand from July 23 until August 2, 2009. Teams played a round robin schedule, with the top four teams of the eighth-final four advancing to the knockout stage.

== Overview ==
The United States won their fourth title. The other medalists in the tournament were Spain (silver) and Argentina (bronze). Spain's Marta Xargay was chosen as the tournaments MVP with an average of 15.4 PPG. Australia also had a strong tournament led by Elizabeth Cambage and had a solid 8-1 record at the end of the tournament. Unfortunately they dropped the one match by one point to Canada in the Quarter-Finals. Eventually they finished 5th.

In the Gold Medal Game, the United States defeated Spain 87-71 despite losing the previous time they met at the tournament 86-90. In the Bronze Medal Match Argentina slipped a victory against the Canadians 58-51.

The host nation Thailand suffered in the tournament despite the home crowd finishing 16th in the 16 team tournament. They finished with a final record of 0-5.

== Venues ==
The tournament was played in one venue. It was held at the Thai-Japanese bangkok Youth Center. The center had two arenas.

== Competing nations ==
FIBA Africa (2)

- Mali
- Tunisia

FIBA Asia (4)

- China
- Japan
- South Korea
- Thailand (Host Nation)

FIBA Americas (4)

- Argentina
- Brazil
- Canada
- United States

FIBA Oceania (1)

- Australia

FIBA Europe (5)

- France
- Russia
- Spain
- Lithuania
- Czech Republic

== Groups ==
Group A	Group B	Group C	Group D
Argentina; Australia; France; South Korea	Brazil; Czech Republic; Lithuania; Thailand	Canada; Japan; Russia; Tunisia	China; Mali; Spain; United States

== Preliminary Round ==
Times given below are in Thailand Standard Time

=== Group A ===
Team	Pld	W	L	PF	PA	PD	Pts
Australia	3	3	0	240	149	+91	6
Argentina	3	2	1	184	196	-12	5
France	3	1	2	204	173	+31	4
South Korea	3	0	3	151	261	−110	3

July 23
11:30

Report

France	89–47	South Korea
Scoring by quarter: 21-14, 26-12, 16-16, 26-5
Pts: Thizy 14; Rebs: Vernerey 8 Asts: Konaté 5		Pts: Kim 12; Rebs: S. Lee 9 Asts: S. Lee 1

Bangkok Thai-Japan Youth Center 1, Bangkok

July 23
13:45

Report

Argentina	51–75	Australia
Scoring by quarter: 12-18, 16-18, 11-17, 12-22
Pts: Santana 11; Rebs: Santana 4 Asts: Gonzalez 2		Pts: Cambage 20; Rebs: Cambage 8 Asts: Jarry 2

Bangkok Thai-Japan Youth Center 1, Bangkok

July 24
13:00

Report

Australia	66–57	France
Scoring by quarter: 12-13, 12-16, 22-7, 20-21
Pts: Cambage 38; Rebs: Cambage 10; Asts: Harrington 4		Pts: Okou Zouzouo 14; Rebs: Vernerey 5 Asts: Medenou 1

Bangkok Thai-Japan Youth Center 1, Bangkok

July 24
15:15

Report

South Korea	63–73	Argentina
Scoring by quarter: 18-21, 5-11, 26-14, 14-27
Pts: Ahn 16; Rebs: S. Lee 8 Asts: S. Lee 2		Pts: Kraft 18; Rebs: Burani 10; Asts: Pavicich 3

Bangkok Thai-Japan Youth Center 1, Bangkok

July 25
13:00

Report

France	58–60	Argentina
Scoring by quarter: 15-17, 16-20, 11-13, 16-10
Pts: Vernerey 12; Rebs: Medenou 10; Asts: Vernerey 2		Pts: Burani 13; Rebs: Burani 6 Asts: Flores 3

Bangkok Thai-Japan Youth Center 1, Bangkok

July 25
15:15

Report

Australia	99–41	South Korea
Scoring by quarter: 28-6, 16-17, 31-9, 24-9
Pts: Jarry 24; Rebs: Tippett 8 Asts: Farley 4		Pts: J. Lee 12; Rebs: S. Lee 5 Asts: Kim 2

Bangkok Thai-Japan Youth Center 1, Bangkok

=== Group B ===
Team	Pld	W	L	PF	PA	PD	Pts
Brazil	3	2	1	255	190	+65	5
Czech Republic	3	2	1	257	203	+54	5
Lithuania	3	2	1	230	184	+46	5
Thailand	3	0	3	124	290	−66	3

July 23
17:00

Report

Thailand	45–104	Brazil
Scoring by quarter: 13-23, 7-25, 5-32, 20-24
Pts: Sangtad 15; Rebs: Doksaiyud 7 Asts: Sangtad 3		Pts: Teixeira 24; Rebs: Da Silva Nascimento 11; Asts: Paixao 2

Bangkok Thai-Japan Youth Center 1, Bangkok

July 23
19:15

Report

Czech Republic	84–72	Lithuania
Scoring by quarter: 21-24, 22-12, 22-17, 19-19
Pts: Brezinová 16; Rebs: Stará 7 Asts: Stará 2		Pts: Siksniute 21; Rebs: Paugaite 8 Asts: Solopova 4

Bangkok Thai-Japan Youth Center 1, Bangkok

July 24
17:30

Report

Lithuania	89–34	Thailand
Scoring by quarter: 34-3, 17-10, 16-7, 2-14
Pts: Solopova 20; Rebs: Alminaite 8 Asts: Zintikaite 3		Pts: Doksaiyud 11; Rebs: Phuko 5

Bangkok Thai-Japan Youth Center 1, Bangkok

July 24
19:45

Report

Brazil	86–76	Czech Republic
Scoring by quarter: 20-6, 24-21, 23-19, 19-27
Pts: Costa 18; Rebs: Da Silva Nascimento 6 Asts: Zabani 2		Pts: Hanusová 17; Rebs: Bartonová 6 Asts: Stará 2

Bangkok Thai-Japan Youth Center 1, Bangkok

July 25
17:30

Report

Thailand	45–97	Czech Republic
Scoring by quarter: 8-23, 13-15, 18-28, 6-31
Pts: Napasri 10; Rebs: Sangtad 8 Asts: Promrat 2		Pts: Brezinová 19; Rebs: Bartonová 11; Asts: Bartonová 4

Bangkok Thai-Japan Youth Center 1, Bangkok

July 25
19:45

Report

Lithuania	69–65	Brazil
Scoring by quarter: 18-12, 19-13, 17-18, 15-22
Pts: Solopova 31; Rebs: Paugaite 11; Asts: Pikciute 2		Pts: Pacheco 15; Rebs: Da Silva Nascimento 10; Asts: Teixeira 2

Bangkok Thai-Japan Youth Center 1, Bangkok

=== Group C ===
Team	Pld	W	L	PF	PA	PD	Pts
Russia	3	3	0	230	151	+79	6
Canada	3	2	1	206	131	+75	5
Japan	3	1	2	200	220	-20	4
Tunisia	3	0	3	131	265	−134	3

July 23
12:00

Report

Tunisia	64–85	Japan
Scoring by quarter: 11-27, 19-18, 24-18, 10-22
Pts: Inoubli 18; Rebs: Inoubli 9 Asts: Ben Mechlia 1		Pts: Motoyama 25; Rebs: Mamiya 12; Asts: Kito 2

Bangkok Thai-Japan Youth Center 2, Bangkok

July 23
17:00

Report

Russia	54–46	Canada
Scoring by quarter: 9-11, 13-17, 16-8, 16-10
Pts: Kiryanova 12; Rebs: Tarasova 9		Pts: Achonwa 15; Rebs: Alexander 14; Asts: Achonwa 1

Bangkok Thai-Japan Youth Center 2, Bangkok

July 24
13:00

Report

Canada	87–26	Tunisia
Scoring by quarter: 26-9, 27-3, 16-6, 18-8
Pts: Alexander 13; Rebs: Alexander 10; Asts: Jobin 2		Pts: Inoubli 12; Rebs: Inoubli 4 Asts: Ben Mechlia 1

Bangkok Thai-Japan Youth Center 2, Bangkok

July 24
15:15

Report

Japan	64–83	Russia
Scoring by quarter: 12-24, 18-15, 9-22, 25-22
Pts: Fukano 13 (2ast); Rebs: Fukano 7 Asts: Yodono 2		Pts: Petrushina 15; Rebs: Tarasova 9 Asts: Loginova 2

Bangkok Thai-Japan Youth Center 2, Bangkok

July 25
13:00

Report

Tunisia	41–93	Russia
Scoring by quarter: 8-16, 4-25, 11-29, 18-23
Pts: Inoubli 18; Rebs: Benchickh 7 Asts: Inoubli 3		Pts: Ostroukhova 13; Rebs: Tarasova 8 Asts: Grigoreva 4

Bangkok Thai-Japan Youth Center 2, Bangkok

July 25
15:15

Report

Canada	73–51	Japan
Scoring by quarter: 22-13, 20-10, 16-7, 15-21
Pts: Plouffe 14; Rebs: Alexander 16; Asts: Clarke 2		Pts: Mamiya 15; Rebs: Yodono 6 Asts: Fukano 2

Bangkok Thai-Japan Youth Center 2, Bangkok

=== Group D ===
Team	Pld	W	L	PF	PA	PD	Pts
Spain	3	3	0	256	196	+60	6
United States	3	2	1	274	181	+93	5
China	3	1	2	214	225	-11	4
Mali	3	0	3	133	275	−142	3

July 23
17:00

Report

Spain	90–86	United States
Scoring by quarter: 22-12, 24-20, 13-29, 31-25
Pts: Rodriguez 23; Rebs: Gimeno Martinez 6 Asts: Ouviña 1		Pts: Ogwumike 16; Rebs: Johnson 9 Asts: Prahalis 4

Bangkok Thai-Japan Youth Center 2, Bangkok

July 23
12:00

Report

China	86–60	Mali
Scoring by quarter: 14-19, 17-16, 26-15, 29-10
Pts: Ding 17; Rebs: Lu 6 Asts: Qiu 6		Pts: Mariko 15; Rebs: Dabo 12; Asts: Maiga 2

Bangkok Thai-Japan Youth Center 2, Bangkok

July 24
17:30

Report

Mali	35–89	Spain
Scoring by quarter: 6-23, 4-16, 10-35, 15-15
Pts: Mariko 14; Rebs: Mariko 12; Asts: Coulibaly 1		Pts: Xargay 12; Rebs: Blé Ossepe 13; Asts: Rodriguez 3

Bangkok Thai-Japan Youth Center 2, Bangkok

July 24
12:00

Report

United States	88–53	China
Scoring by quarter: 23-15, 17-10, 26-16, 22-12
Pts: Ogwumike 18; Rebs: Ogwumike 14; Asts: Diggins 6		Pts: Zhao 12; Rebs: Zheng 6 Asts: Qiu 4

Bangkok Thai-Japan Youth Center 2, Bangkok

July 25
17:30

Report

Spain	77–75	China
Scoring by quarter: 15-21, 25-21, 17-16, 12-11
Pts: Xargay 24; Rebs: Blé Ossepe 8 Asts: Xargay 4		Pts: Lu 24; Rebs: Lu 9 Asts: Qiu 3

Bangkok Thai-Japan Youth Center 2, Bangkok

July 25
19:45

Report

Mali	38–100	United States
Scoring by quarter: 6-25, 13-30, 13-22, 6-23
Pts: Djibo 18; Rebs: Dabo 8 Asts: Dabo 1		Pts: Faris 13; Rebs: Williams 8 Asts: Faris 3

Bangkok Thai-Japan Youth Center 2, Bangkok

== Eighth-final round ==
=== Group E ===
Team	Pld	W	L	PF	PA	PD	Pts
Australia	6	6	0	473	318	+155	12
Argentina	6	4	2	375	371	+4	10
France	6	3	3	378	333	+45	9
Lithuania	6	3	3	394	355	+39	9
Czech Republic	6	3	3	452	428	+24	9
Brazil	6	2	4	400	391	+9	8

27 July 2009
15:15

Report

Czech Republic	72–60	Argentina
Scoring by quarter: 16–15, 24–14, 20–17, 12–14
Pts: Hanušová 20; Rebs: Bartonová 7 Asts: Stará 2		Pts: Boquete 12; Rebs: Gonzalez 6 Asts: Gonzalez 2

Bangkok Thai-Japan Youth Center-Arena 1, Bangkok

27 July 2009
17:30

Report

Lithuania	53–69	Australia
Scoring by quarter: 14–18, 9–16, 10–21, 20–14
Pts: Pikciute 15; Rebs: Paugaite 7 Asts: Paugaite 2		Pts: Cambage 20; Rebs: Jarry 11; Asts: Farley 3

Bangkok Thai-Japan Youth Center-Arena 1, Bangkok

27 July 2009
19:45

Report

Brazil	48–59	France
Scoring by quarter: 17–16, 7–19, 11–6, 13–18
Pts: Tati 16; Rebs: Caetano de Souza 11; Asts: Tati 2		Pts: Plagnard 15; Rebs: Medenou 10; Asts: Datchy 2

Bangkok Thai-Japan Youth Center-Arena 1, Bangkok
Attendance: 2000

28 July 2009
15:15

Report

Australia	92–65	Czech Republic
Scoring by quarter: 24–11, 23–17, 26–15, 19–22
Pts: Jarry 17; Rebs: Jarry 10; Asts: Ireland 3		Pts: Skutilová 14; Rebs: Brezinová 4 Asts: Bartonová 1

Bangkok Thai-Japan Youth Center-Arena 1, Bangkok

28 July 2009
17:30

Report

France	42–54	Lithuania
Scoring by quarter: 8–5, 17–14, 9–15, 8–20
Pts: Konteh 13; Rebs: Vernerey 7 Asts: Plagnard 3		Pts: Solopova 21; Rebs: Paugaite 13; Asts: Solopova 4

Bangkok Thai-Japan Youth Center-Arena 1, Bangkok

28 July 2009
19:45

Report

Argentina	70–46	Brazil
Scoring by quarter: 25–9, 9–15, 15–14, 21–8
Pts: Gonzalez 19; Rebs: Santana 8 Asts: Flores 2		Pts: Zabani 9 Rebs: Zabani 9 Asts: Tati 1

Bangkok Thai-Japan Youth Center-Arena 1, Bangkok
Attendance: 2000

29 July 2009
13:00

Report

Czech Republic	58–73	France
Scoring by quarter: 23–15, 17–14, 9–22, 9–22
Pts: Bartonová 16; Rebs: Brezinová 8 Asts: Bartonová 4		Pts: Okou Zouzouo; Rebs: Minte 11; Asts: Plagnard 5

Bangkok Thai-Japan Youth Center-Arena 1, Bangkok

29 July 2009
15:15

Report

Lithuania	57–61	Argentina
Scoring by quarter: 11–5, 10–17, 20–13, 16–26
Pts: Siksniute 18; Rebs: Paugaite 9 Asts: Zintikaite 6		Pts: Burani 12; Rebs: Burani 7

Bangkok Thai-Japan Youth Center-Arena 1, Bangkok

29 July 2009
17:30

Report

Brazil	51–72	Australia
Scoring by quarter: 15–22, 12–21, 4–17, 20–12
Pts: Tati 12; Rebs: Ferreira 5 Asts: Teixeira 1		Pts: Cambage 20; Rebs: Moult 10; Asts: Cumming 3

Bangkok Thai-Japan Youth Center-Arena 1, Bangkok

=== Group F ===
Team	Pld	W	L	PF	PA	PD	Pts
Spain	6	6	0	479	363	+116	12
United States	6	5	1	522	355	+167	11
Russia	6	4	2	407	358	+49	10
Canada	6	3	3	387	334	+53	9
Japan	6	2	4	403	480	−77	8
China	6	1	5	413	445	−32	7

27 July 2009
15:15

Report

United States	64–50	Canada
Scoring by quarter: 20–12, 19–14, 15–11, 10–13
Pts: Prahalis 14; Rebs: Ogwumike 12; Asts: Prahalis 4		Pts: Alexander 12; Rebs: Wicijowski 16; Asts: Jobin 3

Bangkok Thai-Japan Youth Center-Arena 2, Bangkok

27 July 2009
17:30

Report

China	62–67	Russia
Scoring by quarter: 19–17, 18–22, 9–16, 16–12
Pts: Ding 16; Rebs: Zhang 7 Asts: Qiu 3		Pts: Logunova 17; Rebs: Logunova 13; Asts: Loginova 2

Bangkok Thai-Japan Youth Center-Arena 2, Bangkok

27 July 2009
19:45

Report

Spain	81–57	Japan
Scoring by quarter: 19–12, 14–13, 23–15, 25–17
Pts: Xargay 23; Rebs: Xargay 11; Asts: Menendez Antoli 5		Pts: Mamiya 15; Rebs: Mamiya 10; Asts: Ito 1

Bangkok Thai-Japan Youth Center-Arena 2, Bangkok

28 July 2009
15:15

Report

Russia	56–75	United States
Scoring by quarter: 17–23, 15–17, 18–15, 6–20
Pts: Shilova; Rebs: Logunova 9 Asts: Dorosheva 1		Pts: Ogwumike 12; Rebs: Ogwumike 13; Asts: Prahalis 7

Bangkok Thai-Japan Youth Center-Arena 2, Bangkok

28 July 2009
15:45

Report

Japan	78–70	China
Scoring by quarter: 19–19, 19–14, 19–19, 21–18
Pts: Mamiya 18; Rebs: Mamiya 8 Asts: Fukano 2		Pts: Zheng 19; Rebs: Zhao 10; Asts: Qiu 4

Bangkok Thai-Japan Youth Center-Arena 2, Bangkok

28 July 2009
19:45

Report

Canada	56–72	Spain
Scoring by quarter: 20–22, 15–21, 10–21, 11–8
Pts: Achonwa 14; Rebs: Achonwa 9 Asts: Vaughan 3		Pts: Ouviña 17; Rebs: Blé Ossepe 8 Asts: Ouviña 3

Bangkok Thai-Japan Youth Center-Arena 2, Bangkok

29 July 2009
13:00

Report

United States	109–68	Japan
Scoring by quarter: 33–16, 25–19, 24–17, 27–16
Pts: Spani 15; Rebs: Johnson 7 Asts: Prahalis 4		Pts: Fukano 15; Rebs: Mamiya 6 Asts: Fukano 3

Bangkok Thai-Japan Youth Center-Arena 2, Bangkok

29 July 2009
15:45

Report

China	67–75	Canada
Scoring by quarter: 19–12, 15–34, 15–13, 18–16
Pts: Lu 20; Rebs: Qiu 8 Asts: Qiu 6		Pts: Wicijowski 20; Rebs: Wicijowski 13; Asts: Vaughan 3

Bangkok Thai-Japan Youth Center-Arena 2, Bangkok

29 July 2009
18:00

Report

Spain	70–54	Russia
Scoring by quarter: 13–10, 17–13, 10–15, 30–16
Pts: Gimeno Martinez 17; Rebs: Blé Ossepe 10; Asts: Ouviña 3		Pts: Petrushina 13; Rebs: Petrushina 5 Asts: Petrushina 2

Bangkok Thai-Japan Youth Center-Arena 2, Bangkok

== Knockout stage ==
=== Bracket ===
Quarter-finals
July 31
Australia	49
Canada	50
July 31
France	75
United States	88
July 31
Argentina	67
Russia	65
July 31
Lithuania	47
Spain	79

Semi-finals
August 1
Canada	51
United States	82
August 1
Argentina	49
Spain	67

Final
August 2
United States	87
Spain	71
Third place
August 2
Canada	51
Argentina	58

5th place bracket

Semi-finals
August 1
Australia	71
France	53
August 1
Russia	65
Lithuania	62

Fifth place
August 2
Australia	78
Russia	38
Seventh place
August 2
France	65
Lithuania	56

9th place bracket

Semi-finals
July 31
Czech Republic	76
China	70
July 31
Brazil	65
Japan	56

Ninth place
August 1
Czech Republic	70
Brazil	75
Eleventh place
August 1
China	76
Japan	59

13th place bracket

Semi-finals
July 27
South Korea	66
Thailand	55
July 27
Tunisia	35
Mali	53

Thirteenth place
July 28
South Korea	68
Mali	52
Fifteenth place
July 28
Thailand	65
Tunisia	80

=== Quarterfinals ===
31 July 2009
13:00

Report

Australia	49–50	Canada
Scoring by quarter: 15-15, 11–14, 9–11, 14–10
Pts: Cambage 26; Rebs: Cambage 10; Asts: Madgen 4		Pts: Achonwa 16; Rebs: Alexander 15; Asts: Vaughan 2

Bangkok Thai-Japan Youth Center-Arena 1, Bangkok

31 July 2009
15:15

Report

France	75–88	United States
Scoring by quarter: 22–16, 14–20, 23–27, 16–25
Pts: Datchy 17; Rebs: Minte 7 Asts: Plagnard 2		Pts: Ogwumike 16; Rebs: Ogwumike 9 Asts: Prahalis 7

Bangkok Thai-Japan Youth Center-Arena 1, Bangkok

31 July 2009
17:30

Report

Argentina	67–65	Russia
Scoring by quarter: 20–15, 13–15, 6–13, 20–16
Pts: Boquete 18; Rebs: Boquete 10; Asts: Flores 3		Pts: Logunova 14; Rebs: Logunova 11; Asts: Petrushina 1

Bangkok Thai-Japan Youth Center-Arena 1, Bangkok

31 July 2009
21:00

Report

Lithuania	47–79	Spain
Scoring by quarter: 18–23, 13–12, 8–19, 8–25
Pts: Paugaite 15; Rebs: Paugaite 11; Asts: Siksniute 3		Pts: Ouviña 19; Rebs: Blé Ossepé 9 Asts: Ouviña 3

Bangkok Thai-Japan Youth Center-Arena 1, Bangkok

=== Classification 13–16 ===
27 July 2009
11:00

Report

South Korea	66–55	Thailand
Scoring by quarter: 16–9, 15–22, 18–9, 32–26
Pts: Lee 21; Rebs: Heo 10; Asts: Ahn 4		Pts: Sangtad 15; Rebs: Promrat 9 Asts: Sangtad 10

Bangkok Thai-Japan Youth Center-Arena 1, Bangkok

27 July 2009
13:00

Report

Tunisia	35–53	Mali
Scoring by quarter: 7–19, 8–18, 12–11, 8–5
Pts: Arami 19; Rebs: Arami 10; Asts: Kachouri 4		Pts: Coulibaly 13; Rebs: Coulibaly 15; Asts: Maiga 2

Bangkok Thai-Japan Youth Center-Arena 2, Bangkok

=== Classification 9–12 ===
31 July 2009
13:00

Report

Czech Republic	76–70	China
Scoring by quarter: 18–26, 23–13, 13–20, 22–11
Pts: Bartonová 16; Rebs: Hanusová 13; Asts: Bartonová 16		Pts: Zheng 12; Rebs: Lu 5 Asts: Qiu 2

Bangkok Thai-Japan Youth Center-Arena 2, Bangkok

31 July 2009
15:15

Report

Brazil	62–56	Japan
Scoring by quarter: 14–22, 12–11, 20–14, 16–9
Pts: Pacheco 20; Rebs: Da Silva Nascimento 15; Asts: Teixeira 4		Pts: Mamiya 18; Rebs: Mamiya 14; Asts: Kito 5

Bangkok Thai-Japan Youth Center-Arena 2, Bangkok

=== Classification 5–8 ===
1 August 2009
13:00

Report

Australia	71–53	France
Scoring by quarter: 18–12, 20–12, 22–16, 11–13
Pts: Cambage 23; Rebs: Cambage 8 Asts: Cumming 3		Pts: Medenou 14; Rebs: Medenou 7 Asts: Konaté 2

Bangkok Thai-Japan Youth Center-Arena 1, Bangkok

1 August 2009
15:15

Report

Russia	65–62	Lithuania
Scoring by quarter: 16–12, 18–19, 14–13, 17–18
Pts: Logunova 14; Rebs: Logunova 12; Asts: Kiryanova 2		Pts: Paugaite 14; Rebs: Paugaite 17; Asts: Solopova 4

Bangkok Thai-Japan Youth Center-Arena 1, Bangkok

=== Semifinals ===
1 August 2009
17:30

Report

Canada	51–82	United States
Scoring by quarter: 6–27, 12–23, 18–17, 15–15
Pts: Alexander 12; Rebs: Alexander 9 Asts: Colley 1		Pts: Bone 16; Rebs: Williams 7 Asts: Diggins 3

Bangkok Thai-Japan Youth Center-Arena 1, Bangkok

1 August 2009
19:45

Report

Argentina	49–67	Spain
Scoring by quarter: 3–19, 21–12, 12–22, 13–14
Pts: Boquete 21; Rebs: Budini 6 Asts: Boquete 2		Pts: Tudanca Acedo 18; Rebs: Blé Ossepe 10; Asts: Ouviña 2

Bangkok Thai-Japan Youth Center-Arena 1, Bangkok

=== Fifteenth place game ===
28 July 2009
11:00

Report

Thailand	65–80	Tunisia
Scoring by quarter: 11–21, 20–17, 23–17, 11–25
Pts: Sawatong 16; Rebs: Doksaiyud 10; Asts: Promrat 2		Pts: Inoubli 26; Rebs: Mefteh 13; Asts: Ben Mechlia 4

Bangkok Thai-Japan Youth Center-Arena 1, Bangkok

=== Thirteenth place game ===
28 July 2009
13:00

Report

South Korea	68–52	Mali
Scoring by quarter: 18–11, 13–14, 18–12, 19–15
Pts: Kim 24; Rebs: Lee 11; Asts: Park 2		Pts: Coulibaly 17; Rebs: Coulibaly 12; Asts: Traoré 4

Bangkok Thai-Japan Youth Center-Arena 2, Bangkok

=== Eleventh place game ===
1 August 2009
13:00

Report

China	76–59	Japan
Scoring by quarter: 25–16, 8–11, 23–13, 20–19
Pts: Zheng 18; Rebs: Qiu 11; Asts: Qiu 6		Pts: Abe 27; Rebs: Mamiya 13; Asts: Fukano 2

Bangkok Thai-Japan Youth Center-Arena 2, Bangkok

=== Ninth place game ===
30 July 2011
11:15

Report

Czech Republic	70–75	Brazil
Scoring by quarter: 11–23, 9–16, 15–11, 27–16
Pts: Brezinová 20; Rebs: Brezinová 12; Asts: Bartonová 3		Pts: Pacheco 18; Rebs: Caetano de Souza 16; Asts: Costa 3

Bangkok Thai-Japan Youth Center-Arena 2, Bangkok

=== Seventh place game ===
2 August 2009
11:15

Report

France	65–56	Lithuania
Scoring by quarter: 18–22, 17–9, 18–9, 12–16
Pts: Datchy 13; Rebs: Vernerey 15; Asts: Konaté 5		Pts: Solopova 21; Rebs: Paugaite 6 Asts: Solopova 1

Bangkok Thai-Japan Youth Center-Arena 1, Bangkok

=== Fifth place game ===
2 August 2009
13:30

Report

Australia	78–38	Russia
Scoring by quarter: 15–7, 15–13, 28–9, 20–9
Pts: Jarry 19; Rebs: Jarry 9 Asts: Madgen 5		Pts: Tarasova 9 Rebs: Tarasova 6 Asts: Ostroukhova 2

Bangkok Thai-Japan Youth Center-Arena 1, Bangkok

=== Third place game ===
2 August 2009
15:45

Report

Canada	51–58	Argentina
Scoring by quarter: 11–11, 13–16, 8–18, 19–13
Pts: Alexander 18; Rebs: Alexander 14; Asts: Vaughan 3		Pts: Gonzalez 14; Rebs: Burani 6 Asts: Santana 1

Bangkok Thai-Japan Youth Center-Arena 1, Bangkok

=== Final ===
2 August 2009
18:00

Report

United States	87–71	Spain
Scoring by quarter: 33–16, 16–14, 18–24, 20–17
Pts: Ogwumike 22; Rebs: Ogwumike 20; Asts: Johnson 3		Pts: Rodriguez 21; Rebs: Blé Ossepe 8 Asts: Ouviña 7

Bangkok Thai-Japan Youth Center-Arena 1, Bangkok

== Final standings ==
Rank	Team
1st place, gold medalist(s)	United States
2nd place, silver medalist(s)	Spain
3rd place, bronze medalist(s)	Argentina
4th	Canada
5th	Australia
6th	Russia
7th	France
8th	Lithuania
9th	Brazil
10th	Czech Republic
11th	China
12th	Japan
13th	South Korea
14th	Mali
15th	Tunisia
16th	Thailand

== Awards ==
2009 Under-19 World Championship for Women winner

United States
Fourth title

Most Valuable Player
(Spain) Marta Xargay

All-Tournament Team

- (Lithuania) Marina Solopova
- (Australia) Elizabeth Cambage
- (United States) Nneka Ogwumike
- (Spain) Marta Xargay
- (Spain) Cristina Ouviña
