= 2020 FIBA Women's Olympic Qualifying Tournaments – Bourges =

2020 FIBA World Olympic Qualifying Tournament for Women
Bourges, France

Tournament details
- Host country: France
- Dates: 6–9 February
- Teams: 4 (from 3 federations)
- Venue: 1 (in 1 host city)

Final positions
- Champions: France

Tournament statistics
- MVP: (France) Sandrine Gruda
- Top scorer: (Australia) Cambage (26.3)
- Top rebounds: (Australia) Cambage (11.0)
- Top assists: (Brazil) Costa (6.7)
- PPG (Team): France (83.3)
- RPG (Team): Australia (42.3)
- APG (Team): France (24.3)

Official website
- WOQT France

The 2020 FIBA Women's Olympic Qualifying Tournament in Bourges was one of four 2020 FIBA Women's Olympic Qualifying Tournaments. The tournament was held in Bourges, France, from 6 to 9 February 2020.

France, Australia and Puerto Rico qualified for the Olympics.

== Teams ==
Team	Qualification	Date of qualification	FIBA World Ranking
France	2nd at the EuroBasket Women 2019	4 July 2019	5th
Australia	2nd at the Asia/Oceania pre-qualifying tournaments–Group B	16 November 2019	2nd
Brazil	2nd at the Americas pre-qualifying tournaments–Group B	17 November 2019	15th
Puerto Rico	2nd at the Americas pre-qualifying tournaments–Group A	17 November 2019	23rd

== Venue ==
Bourges	2020 FIBA Women's Olympic Qualifying Tournaments – Bourges (France)
Palais des sports du Prado	2020 FIBA Women's Olympic Qualifying Tournaments – Bourges (France)
Capacity: 5,000	2020 FIBA Women's Olympic Qualifying Tournaments – Bourges (France)

== Standings ==
Pos	Team	Pld	W	L	PF	PA	PD	Pts	Qualification
1	France (H)	3	3	0	250	186	+64	6	Summer Olympics
2	Australia	3	2	1	249	218	+31	5	Summer Olympics
3	Puerto Rico	3	1	2	216	278	−62	4	Summer Olympics
4	Brazil	3	0	3	233	266	−33	3	

Source: FIBA
Rules for classification: 1) Points; 2) Head-to-head results; 3) Points difference; 4) Points scored.
(H) Hosts

== Results ==
All times are local (UTC+1).

6 February 2020
18:00

Boxscore

Puerto Rico	91–89 (OT)	Brazil
Scoring by quarter: 18–20, 18–22, 19–21, 28–20, Overtime: 8–6
Pts: O'Neill 30; Rebs: Gwathmey 8 Asts: Meléndez 5		Pts: Dantas 26; Rebs: Dantas 15; Asts: Costa 9

Palais des sports du Prado, Bourges
Referees: Yu Jung (TPE), Maripier Malo (CAN), Dariusz Zapolski (POL)

6 February 2020
20:30

Boxscore

France	72–63	Australia
Scoring by quarter: 14–11, 22–19, 18–19, 18–14
Pts: Gruda 16; Rebs: Gruda 11; Asts: Hartley 8		Pts: Allen 20; Rebs: Cambage 20; Asts: Allen 4

Palais des sports du Prado, Bourges
Referees: Luis Castillo (ESP), Maj Forsberg (DEN), Ahmed Al-Shuwaili (IRQ)

8 February 2020
18:00

Boxscore

Australia	100–74	Puerto Rico
Scoring by quarter: 26–15, 29–24, 24–16, 21–19
Pts: Cambage 31; Rebs: George 8 Asts: Mitchell 7		Pts: Gwathmey 30; Rebs: three players 5 Asts: O'Neill 3

Palais des sports du Prado, Bourges
Referees: Luis Castillo (ESP), Maj Forsberg (DEN), Virginia Peruchini (ARG)

8 February 2020
20:30

Boxscore

Brazil	72–89	France
Scoring by quarter: 15–22, 12–16, 19–22, 26–29
Pts: Pacheco 15; Rebs: three players 4 Asts: three players 2		Pts: Gruda 26; Rebs: Gruda 8 Asts: Époupa, Johannès 5

Palais des sports du Prado, Bourges
Referees: Yu Jung (TPE), Maripier Malo (CAN), Zhang Xiao (CHN)

9 February 2020
14:00

Boxscore

Brazil	72–86	Australia
Scoring by quarter: 18–21, 15–18, 27–22, 12–25
Pts: Dantas 21; Rebs: De Souza 9 Asts: Costa 10		Pts: Cambage 29; Rebs: Cambage, Magbegor 7 Asts: Ebzery 5

Palais des sports du Prado, Bourges
Referees: Luis Castillo (ESP), Maripier Malo (CAN), Ahmed Al-Shuwaili (IRQ)

9 February 2020
16:30

Boxscore

France	89–51	Puerto Rico
Scoring by quarter: 19–6, 31–14, 16–14, 23–17
Pts: Gruda 20; Rebs: Gruda 10; Asts: Michel 7		Pts: Quiñones 17; Rebs: O'Neill 5 Asts: Rosado 4

Palais des sports du Prado, Bourges
Referees: Yu Jung (TPE), Dariusz Zapolski (POL), Virginia Peruchini (ARG)

== Statistics and awards ==
=== Statistical leaders ===
Players

Points

Name	PPG
(Australia) Liz Cambage	26.3
(France) Sandrine Gruda	20.7
(Brazil) Damiris Dantas	18.0
(Puerto Rico) Jazmon Gwathmey	17.0
(Puerto Rico) Jennifer O'Neill	16.7

Rebounds

Name	RPG
(Australia) Liz Cambage	11.0
(France) Sandrine Gruda	9.7
(Brazil) Damiris Dantas	8.3
(Brazil) Érika de Souza	7.0
(Puerto Rico) Jazmon Gwathmey	5.3
(Puerto Rico) Jennifer O'Neill	5.3

Assists

Name	APG
(Brazil) Débora Costa	6.7
(Australia) Leilani Mitchell	4.7
(France) Bria Hartley	4.7
(France) Marine Johannès	4.0
(France) Olivia Époupa	3.7
(France) Sarah Michel	3.7

Blocks

Name	BPG
(Australia) Liz Cambage	2.3
(Australia) Cayla George	1.0
(France) Sandrine Gruda	1.0
(France) Iliana Rupert	1.0
(Brazil) Érika de Souza	0.7
(France) Endéné Miyem	0.7

Steals

Name	SPG
(Brazil) Débora Costa	3.0
(France) Bria Hartley	2.3
(Puerto Rico) Jazmon Gwathmey	2.3
(Puerto Rico) Ali Gibson	2.0
(Australia) Rebecca Allen	1.7
(Brazil) Patty Teixeira	1.7

Teams

Points

Team	PPG
France	83.3
Australia	83.0
Brazil	77.7
Puerto Rico	72.0

Rebounds

Name	RPG
Australia	42.3
France	41.3
Brazil	34.3
Puerto Rico	34.0

Assists

Name	APG
France	24.3
Australia	21.7
Brazil	15.7
Puerto Rico	10.7

Blocks

Name	BPG
Australia	4.0
France	3.7
Brazil	1.0
Puerto Rico	0.7

Steals

Name	SPG
Brazil	8.3
France	8.3
Puerto Rico	6.7
Australia	5.0

=== Awards ===
The all star-teams and MVP were announced on 9 February 2020.

All-Star Team
Guards	Forwards	Center
(France) Bria Hartley (Puerto Rico) Jazmon Gwathmey	(Australia) Rebecca Allen (France) Sandrine Gruda	(Australia) Liz Cambage
MVP: (France) Sandrine Gruda
