= Aminata Konaté =

Aminata Konaté may refer to:

- Aminata Konaté (basketball) (born 1990), French basketball player
- Aminata Konaté (sprinter) (born 1968), Guinean sprinter
