= Astan Dabo =

Malian basketball player (born 1992)

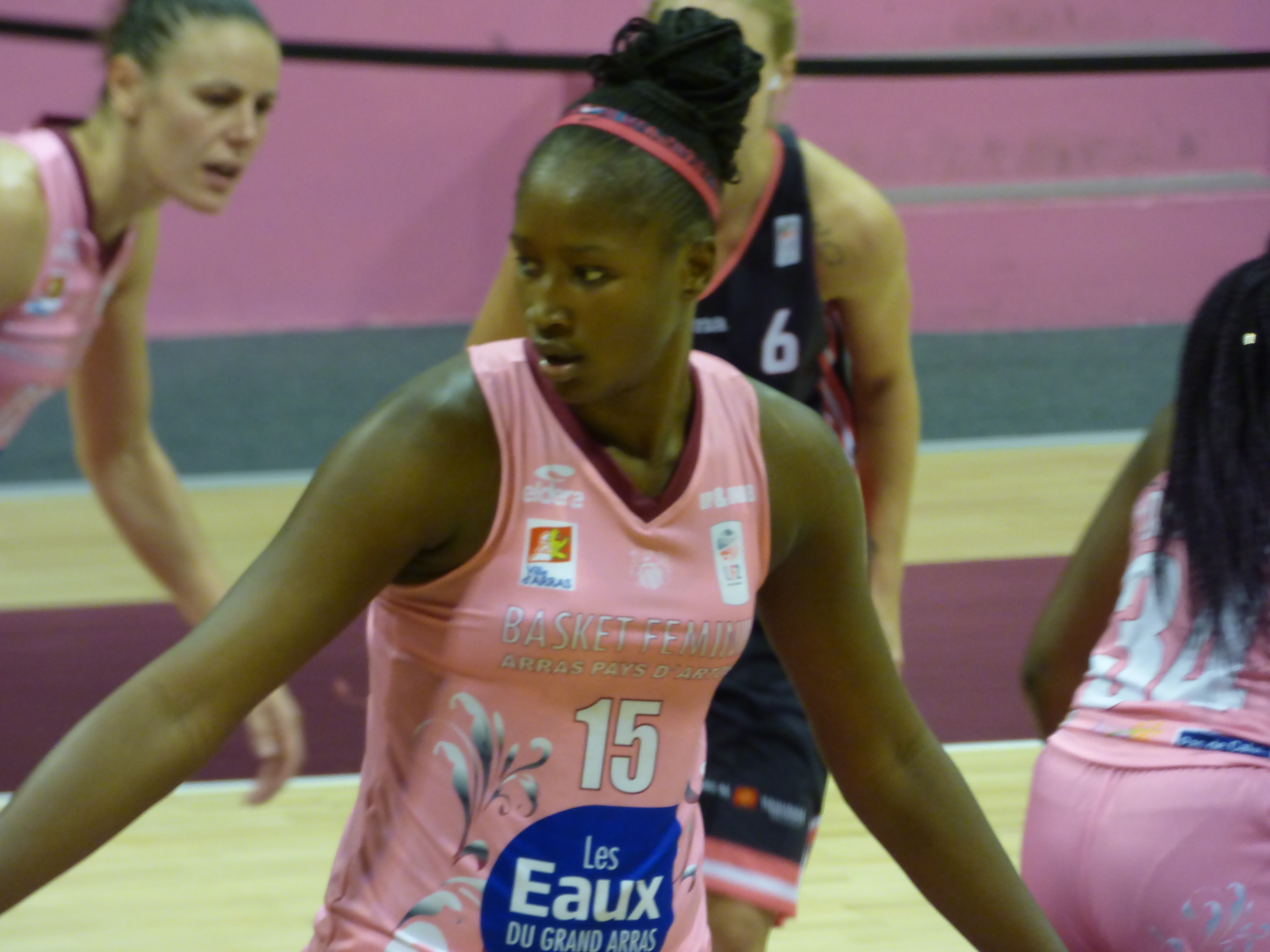

Personal information
- Born: May 30, 1992 (age 34) Songoniko, Mali
- Listed height: 6 ft 8 in (2.03 m)

Career information
- WNBA draft: 2012: 1st round, 9th overall pick
- Drafted by: Connecticut Sun
- Playing career: 2012–present
- Position: Center
- Stats at Basketball Reference

Astan Dabo (born May 30, 1992) is a Malian basketball center, drafted by the Connecticut Sun of the Women's National Basketball Association. She has played in France and has represented Mali at 2010 World Championships.

== WNBA ==
She was selected in the first round of the 2012 WNBA draft (9th overall) by the Connecticut Sun.
