= Peyton Williams =

American basketball player (born 1998)

Personal information
- Born: April 27, 1998 (age 28)
- Listed height: 6 ft 3 in (1.91 m)
- Listed weight: 185 lb (84 kg)

Career information
- High school: Cair Paravel (Topeka, Kansas)
- College: Kansas State (2016–2020)
- Playing career: 2022–present
- Position: Forward

Career history
- 2024–2026: Wuhan Shengfan
- 2026: Phoenix Mercury
- Stats at Basketball Reference
Medals
Women's basketball
Representing the United States
Pan American Games
Silver medal – second place	2019 Peru	Team

Peyton Williams (born April 27, 1998) is an American professional basketball player. She played college basketball at Kansas State.

== College career ==
Williams played college basketball at Kansas State. During the 2019–20 season, in her senior year, she started 28 games and averaged 15.4 points, 11.0 rebounds, and 3.1 assists per game. She became the third player in program history to record a double-double for an entire season, and the first to accomplish this since Kendra Wecker during the 2004–05 season. She became the first player in program history with 1,500 or more career points, 950 or more career rebounds, 200 or more career assists, 150 or more steals and 100 or more career blocks. She ranked third in career rebounds (967), third in career double-doubles (33), fifth in career blocks (119), and ninth in career point (1,553).

== Professional career ==
Following her collegiate career, Williams played professionally in Russia, France, Hungary and China. On October 30, 2024, she signed with Wuhan Shengfan of the Women's Chinese Basketball Association. During the 2024–25 season she averaged 15.0 points, 9.0 rebounds, 2.1 assists and 2.1 steals per game. During the 2025–26 season, she averaged 12.0 points, 7.1 rebounds, 1.6 steals and 1.5 assists in 29.9 minutes per game.

On April 15, 2026, Williams signed a free agent contract with the Portland Fire of the WNBA. She was waived by the Fire on May 1, 2026. On May 3, 2026, she was claimed off waivers by the Phoenix Mercury. She made the Mercury's opening day roster.

== National team career ==
Williams represented the United States at the 2019 Pan American Games where she averaged 3.0 points and 2.8 rebounds per game and won a silver medal.
