= Mara Marchizotti =

Argentine basketball player

No. 15 – Tomás de Rocamora
- Position: Center
- League: LNB

Personal information
- Born: 16 June 1994 (age 32) Buenos Aires, Argentina
- Listed height: 6 ft 4 in (1.93 m)
- Listed weight: 187 lb (85 kg)

Career information
- College: Bishop's (2018)
- WNBA draft: 2018: undrafted

Mara Lis Marchizotti (born 16 June 1994) is an Argentine basketball player for Tomás de Rocamora and the Argentine national team.

She participated at the 2018 FIBA Women's Basketball World Cup.
