= Aminata Konaté (basketball) =

French basketball player

Aminata Konate
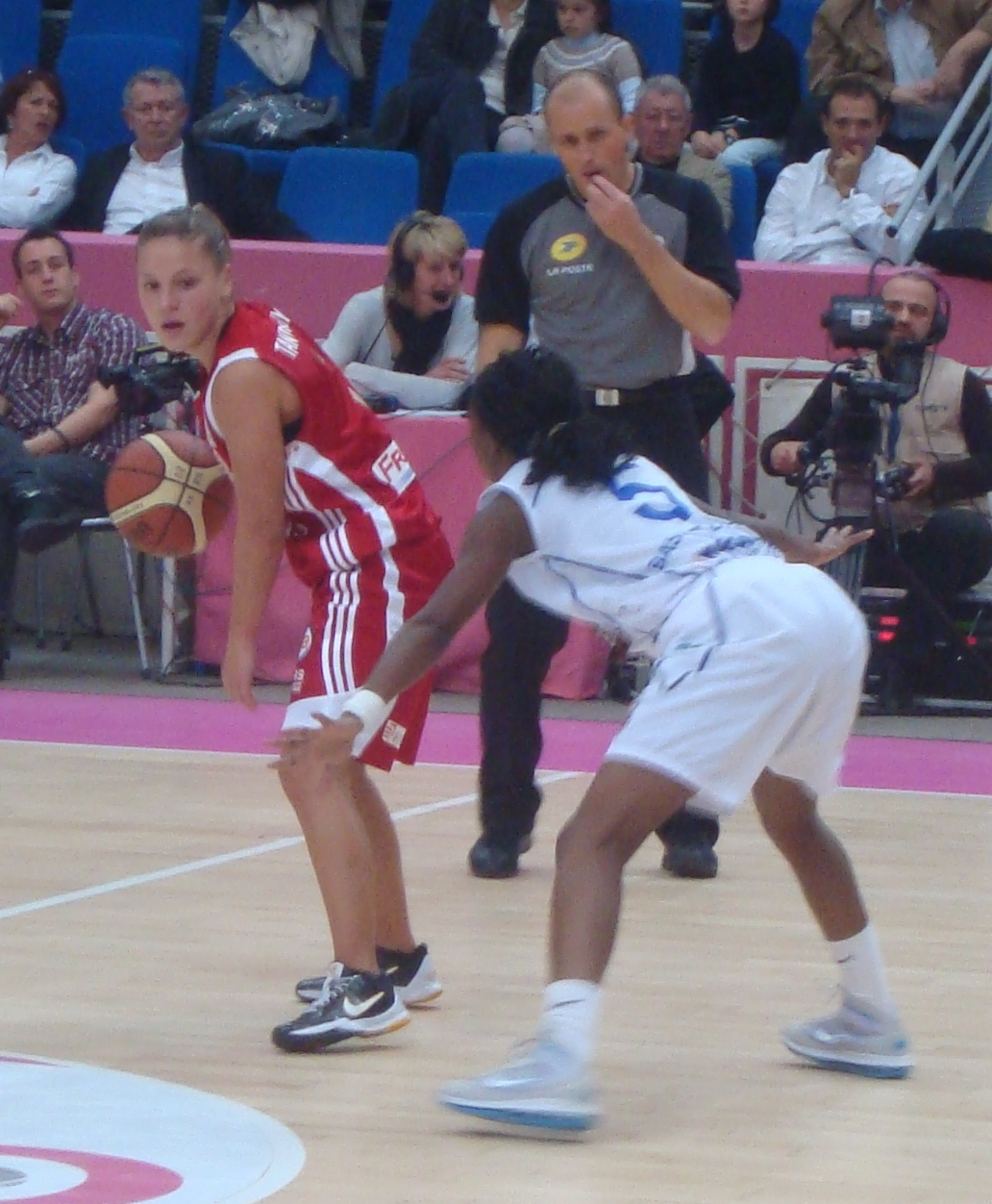
- Aminata Konate playing basketball
- Born: 24 October 1990 (age 35); Paris
- Occupation: Basketball player

Aminata Konate (born 24 October 1990) is a French basketball player who plays for club Cavigal Nice of the League feminine de basket the top league of basketball for women in France.
