= Natacha Pérez =

Argentine basketball player

No. 22 – Almería, España
- Position: Small forward
- League: LNB

Personal information
- Born: 30 March 1991 (age 35) Godoy Cruz, Argentina
- Listed height: 5 ft 9 in (1.75 m)
- Listed weight: 180 lb (82 kg)

Career information
- WNBA draft: 2013: undrafted
Medals
Women's basketball
Representing Argentina
Pan American Games
Silver medal – second place	2019 Lima	National 3x3 team

Natacha Estefania Pérez (born 30 March 1991) is an Argentine basketball player for Las Heras Mendoza and the Argentina women's national basketball team.

She defended Argentina at the 2018 FIBA Women's Basketball World Cup.
