= Anushka Maldonado =

Puerto Rican basketball player

No. 3 – San Sebastián
- Position: Guard
- League: BSN

Personal information
- Born: September 25, 1995 (age 31) Roy, Washington, U.S.
- Listed height: 6 ft 1 in (1.85 m)

Career information
- College: UTRGV (2016)
- WNBA draft: 2017: undrafted
Medals
Women's basketball
Representing Puerto Rico
Pan American Games
Bronze medal – third place	2019 Lima	Team
Central American and Caribbean Games
Bronze medal – third place	2018 Barranquilla	Team

Anushka Maldonado (born September 29, 1995) is a Puerto Rican basketball player for San Sebastián and the Puerto Rican national team.

She participated at the 2018 FIBA Women's Basketball World Cup.
