= Dayshalee Salamán =

Puerto Rican basketball player

No. 12 – Obras Sanitarias
- Position: Guard
- League: LNB

Personal information
- Born: August 17, 1990 (age 36) Carolina, Puerto Rico
- Listed height: 5 ft 5 in (1.65 m)

Career information
- College: Lincoln Memorial (2010)
- WNBA draft: 2012: undrafted
Medals
Women's basketball
Representing Puerto Rico
FIBA AmeriCup
Silver medal – second place	2021 San Juan
Pan American Games
Bronze medal – third place	2019 Lima	Team
Central American and Caribbean Games
Silver medal – second place	2014 Veracruz	Team
Bronze medal – third place	2018 Barranquilla	Team

Dayshalee Salamán (born August 17, 1990) is a Puerto Rican basketball player for Obras Sanitarias and the Puerto Rican national team.

She participated at the 2018 FIBA Women's Basketball World Cup. She is openly lesbian.
