= Patrícia Teixeira =

Brazilian basketball player (born 1990)

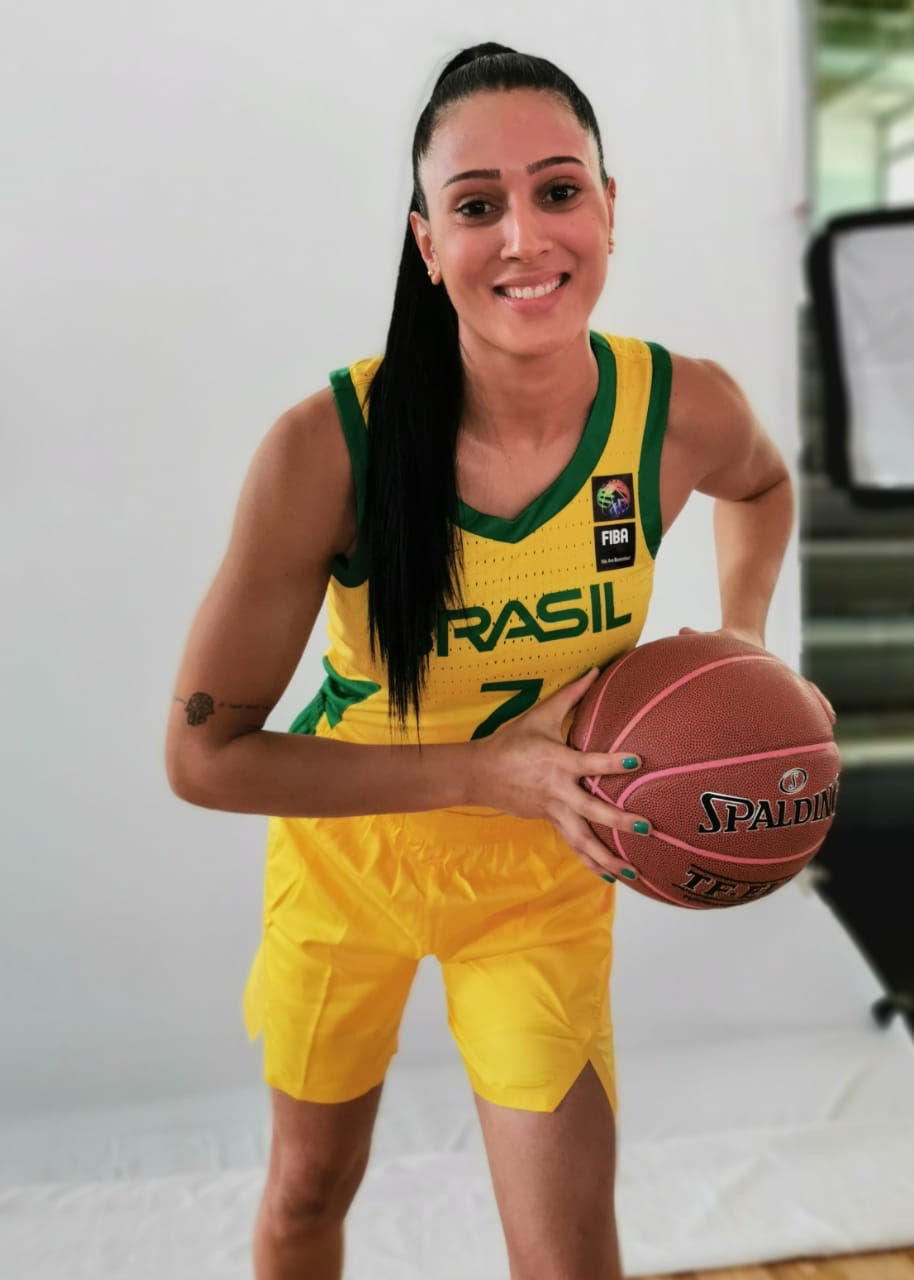

São José Desportivo
- Position: Guard
- League: Brazilian League

Personal information
- Born: September 28, 1990 (age 36)
- Listed height: 5 ft 10 in (1.78 m)
Medals
Women's basketball
Representing Brazil
Pan American Games
Gold medal – first place	2019 Lima	Team
FIBA AmeriCup
Bronze medal – third place	2021 San Juan
South American Championship
Gold medal – first place	2022 Argentina	Team

Patrícia Teixeira (born 28 September 1990) is a Brazilian basketball player for São José Desportivo and the Brazilian women's national team, where she participated at the 2014 FIBA World Championship.

She was also a member of the Brazil women's national basketball team which competed at the 2015 Pan American Games.
