= Tatiane Pacheco =

Brazilian basketball player (born 1990)

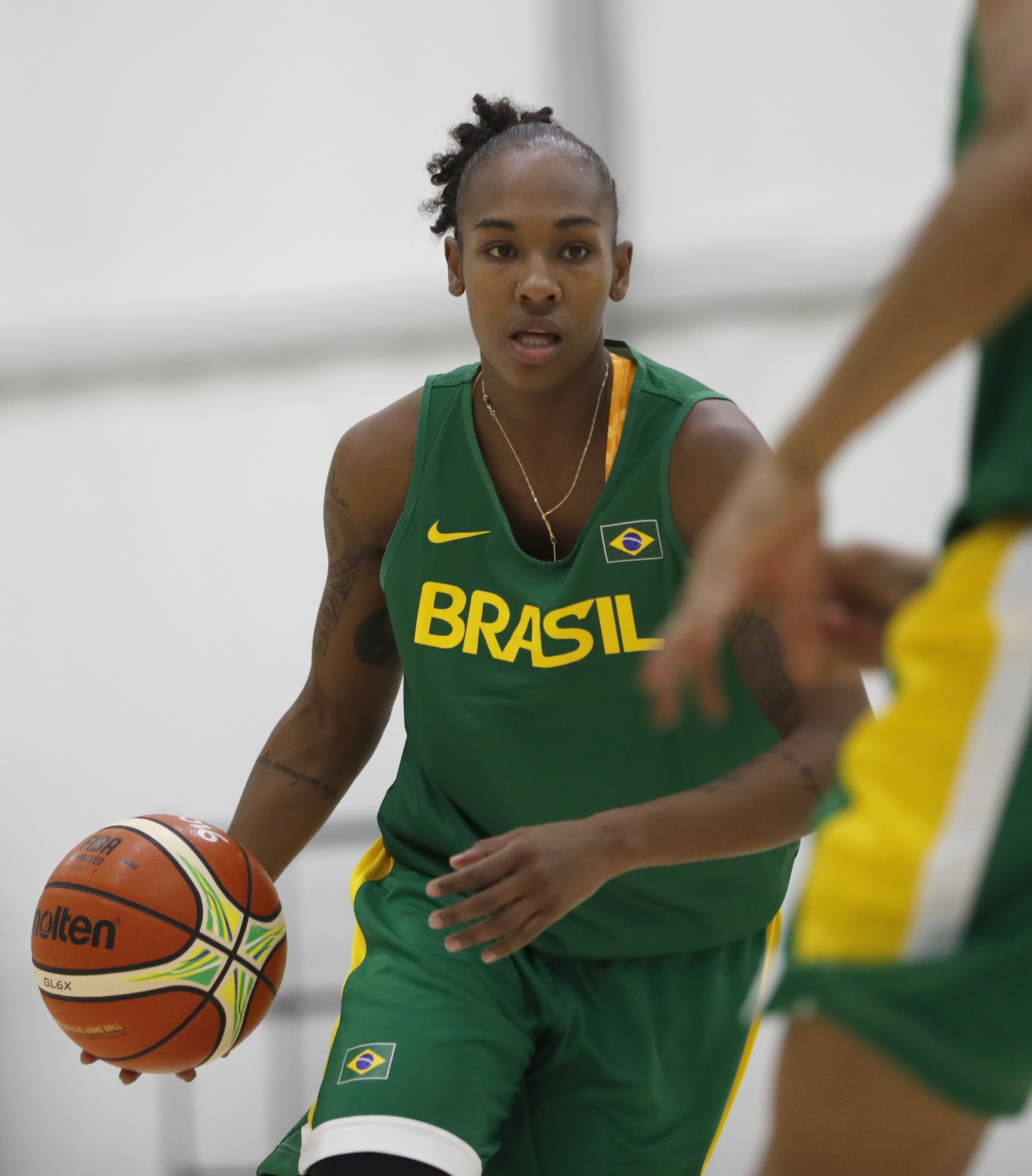

No. 10 – América Basquete
- Position: Shooting guard
- League: LBF

Personal information
- Born: October 16, 1990 (age 36) São Paulo, Brazil
- Listed height: 1.81 m (5 ft 11 in)
Medals
Women's basketball
Representing Brazil
Pan American Games
Gold medal – first place	2019 Lima	Team
Americas Championship
Bronze medal – third place	2013 Xalapa	Team
South American Championship
Gold medal – first place	2013 Mendoza	Team
Gold medal – first place	2014 Ambato	Team
Gold medal – first place	2016 Barquisimeto	Team
Americas U-18 Championship
Bronze medal – third place	2008 Argentina	Team

Tatiane Nascimento Pacheco (born October 16, 1990) is a Brazilian basketball player for América Basquete Recife and the Brazilian national team. She began in the sport at the age 9, and six years later was already in the junior squads of the national team. Pacheco started playing for the adult team in 2013, where she won the South American Championship and a bronze medal at Americas Championship, earning her and the Brazilian team a spot at the 2014 FIBA World Championship.

While Pacheco was listed for the 2016 Summer Olympics, the day she would debut at the women's tournament she reported an indisposure and went to the medical staff. Following examinations at the Olympic Village medical post, Pacheco was diagnosed with mumps, and had to be cut out of the roster.
