= Débora Costa =

Brazilian basketball player (born 1991)

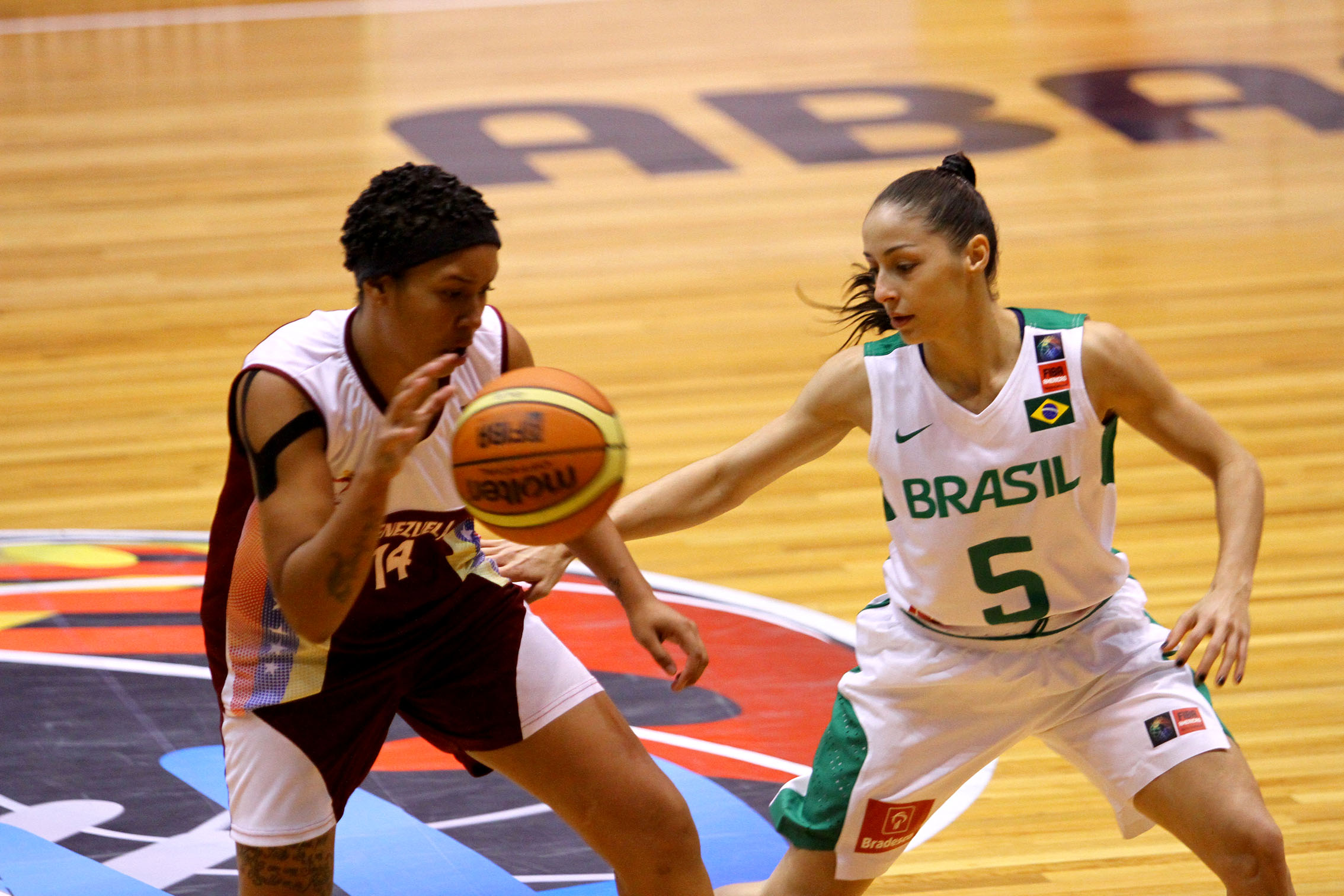
- Débora Costa (right) guards Waleska Perez of Venezuela

No. 5 – América de Recife
- Position: Guard
- League: Brazilian League

Personal information
- Born: August 12, 1991 (age 35) Americana, São Paulo, Brazil
- Listed height: 1.64 m (5 ft 5 in)
- Listed weight: 59 kg (130 lb)
Medals
Women's basketball
Representing Brazil
Pan American Games
Gold medal – first place	2019 Lima	Team
FIBA AmeriCup
Gold medal – first place	2023 León
Bronze medal – third place	2013 Xalapa
Bronze medal – third place	2021 San Juan
South American Championship
Gold medal – first place	2014 Ambato
Gold medal – first place	2013 Mendoza
Gold medal – first place	2022 Argentina	Team
Americas U-18 Championship
Bronze medal – third place	2008 Argentina

Débora Fernandes da Costa (12 August 1991) is a Brazilian basketball player for Sesi Araraquara and the Brazilian national team.

== Career ==
=== Club ===
She started practicing the sport at the age of 8, growing an interest due to her sister training basketball and the fact they living in a city with a traditional club, ADCF Americana. Costa thrived despite her short stature - she began at basketball measuring 1.4 metres (4.6 ft), and grew to only 1.64 metres (5.4 ft) - drawing inspiration from a national team player with the same height, Adriana Moisés Pinto, and focusing on having a fast game. Playing for Americana, she won the Brazilian championship twice, in 2011 and 2013.

=== International ===
After many years in the youth Brazilian teams, Costa was given a chance at the senior squad once Americana coach Luiz Augusto Zanon assumed the Brazilian national team in 2013. As part of the rotation replacing her idol Adrianinha, Costa won two South American Championships and a bronze at the 2013 FIBA Americas Championship for Women, and competed at the 2014 FIBA World Championship, and the 2015 Pan American Games.
