= Gintarasiella =

Scientific classification
- Kingdom: Fungi
- Division: Ascomycota
- Class: Lecanoromycetes
- Order: Teloschistales
- Family: Teloschistaceae
- Genus: Gintarasiella; S.Y.Kondr. & Hur (2017)
- Species: G. aggregata

Binomial name
- Gintarasiella aggregata (Kantvilas & S.Y.Kondr.) S.Y.Kondr. & Hur (2017)
- Holotype: Windmill Bay, Kangaroo Island

Synonyms
- Caloplaca aggregata Kantvilas & S.Y.Kondr. (2016)

Single-species genus of lichen

Gintarasiella is a single-species genus in the fungal family Teloschistaceae. It contains the species Gintarasiella aggregata, a saxicolous (rock-dwelling), crustose lichen that is found in Australia. The lichen forms uneven, pillow-like patches up to 30 mm across, distinguished by its yellow-orange areoles that are tightly packed or spread out and soon covered by many apothecia. These fruiting bodies start as zeorine in form (with a thalline margin) and later become biatorine (lacking a thalline margin), ranging from 0.3 to 1 mm wide and often appearing distorted due to their dense clustering.

== Taxonomy ==
The lichen was first formally described as new to science in 2016 by the lichenologists Gintaras Kantvilas and Sergey Kondratyuk; they classified it in the genus Caloplaca. The type specimen was collected in September, 2012, by the first author from South Australia, specifically at Windmill Bay on Kangaroo Island. This specimen was found growing on outcropping limestone situated within a coastal pasture. The species epithet refers to the tight clustering of the apothecia (fruiting bodies) on the thallus. In 2017, Kondratyuk transferred the taxon to the newly proposed genus Gintarasiella. The genus name honours Kantvilas, "in acknowledgement of his enormous contributions to the taxonomy of the Tasmanian and Australian lichens".

Based on molecular phylogenetics analyses, both independent and combined, Gintarasiella was placed within the subfamily Teloschistoideae of the family Teloschistaceae. Within this subfamily, it establishes a distinct and robust branch in the clade containing Sirenophila-Teloschistopsis-Halophila, positioning itself as the most distinct outgroup to this particular subgroup. Kondratyuk's reclassification of the species was not followed in a later paper by Kantvilas.

== Description ==
The genus Gintarasiella is distinguished within the subfamily Teloschistoideae by its cushion-like form, apothecia (fruiting bodies) densely packed to the extent they almost hide the thallus, and both the hymenium and subhymenium being densely filled with inclusions, along with relatively small ascospores.

Gintarasiella aggregata is a crustose lichen that forms irregular, cushion-like patches up to 30 mm wide, characterised by areoles that are yellow-orange and range from 0.2 to 0.5 mm wide. The areoles are either scattered or contiguous, quickly becoming covered by numerous apothecia (fruiting bodies), which are initially zeorine but become more biatorine as they mature. The apothecia, measuring 0.3 to 1 mm in diameter, are tightly clustered and range in shape from round to distorted-rhomboid due to crowding. The disc of the apothecia is a deeper orange than the thallus, matte, and epruinose (without a powdery coating).

The proper margin of the apothecia is glossy and similar in colour to the disc, becoming less noticeable in older specimens. The subhymenium is hyaline (translucent) and heavily inspersed with oil droplets, while the hymenium, also hyaline, contains oil droplets and a band of golden-yellow crystals. Paraphyses in the hymenium are slender and sparsely branched, widening at the tips. The asci contain eight spores, with the ascospores being polaribilocular and ellipsoid. No pycnidia (asexual reproductive structures) have been found in this species.

=== Similar species ===
Dijigiella subaggregata closely resembles Gintarasiella aggregata, yet it is distinguishable by several key features. It has a thinner thallus and smaller, flatter apothecia. Unlike G. aggregata, the hymenium and subhymenium of D. subaggregata lack oil droplets. Additionally, its ascospores are smaller with wider septa. Another significant difference is its corticolous habit, growing on bark, as opposed to G. aggregata, which grows on rocks.

== Habitat and distribution ==
Gintarasiella aggregata is known to occur only at the type locality on Kangaroo Island. Other lichen species it often associates with include Buellia albula, B. xantholeuca, Caloplaca johnwhinrayi, Cerothallia yorkensis, Flavoplaca kantvilasii, F. mereschkowskiana, and Lecania turicensis.
