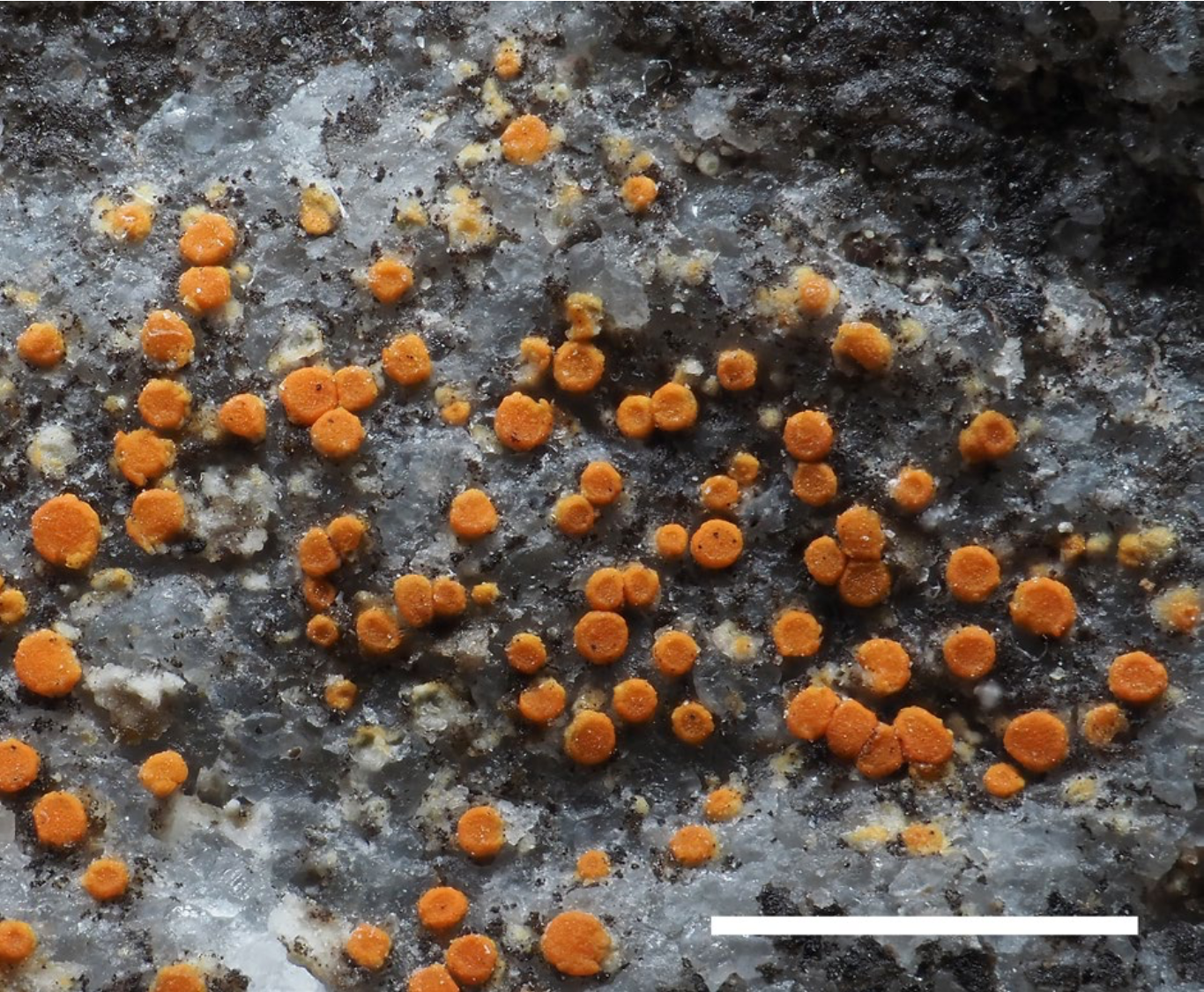
- Transdrakea alacalufes; scale bar = 2 mm

Scientific classification
- Domain: Eukaryota
- Kingdom: Fungi
- Division: Ascomycota
- Class: Lecanoromycetes
- Order: Teloschistales
- Family: Teloschistaceae
- Genus: Transdrakea; Søchting & Arup (2023)

Type species
- Transdrakea alacalufes Søchting, Sancho & Arup (2023)

Species
- T. alacalufes T. schofieldii

= Transdrakea =

Genus of lichens

Transdrakea is a small genus of lichen-forming fungi in the family Teloschistaceae. It comprises two species of crustose lichens that grow on rocks. The genus is characterised by its poorly developed thallus, zeorine apothecia (fruiting bodies), and small ascospores with thin septa. Chemically, Transdrakea species contain anthraquinones, particularly parietin.

== Taxonomy ==
The genus was circumscribed in 2023 by the lichenologists Ulrik Søchting and Ulf Arup. The genus name alludes to its distribution on both sides of the Drake Passage, which separates South America from Antarctica. Transdrakea is closely related to the genus Gondwania, with both genera belonging to a clade of predominantly Southern Hemisphere taxa within the subfamily Xanthorioideae of the family Teloschistaceae. Molecular phylogenetic analyses place Transdrakea as sister to Gondwania, with both genera forming a well-supported clade distinct from other related genera such as Austroplaca and Cerothallia.

== Description ==
Transdrakea lichens are characterised by their crustose growth form, meaning they grow closely adhered to their substrate, typically rocks. The thallus, which is the main body of the lichen, is poorly developed and often inconspicuous. The most prominent features of Transdrakea are its reproductive structures, the apothecia. These are small, disc-shaped fruiting bodies that contain the fungal spores. In Transdrakea, the apothecia are zeorine, which means they have two distinct margins: an inner proper margin composed of fungal tissue, and an outer thalline margin that contains algal cells. The apothecia are typically yellow to orange in colour and can be up to 0.4 mm in diameter.

Under a microscope, the internal structure of the apothecia reveals several features. The hymenium, the spore-producing layer, is relatively thin at 50–60 μm high. The paraphyses, sterile filaments between the spore-producing cells, are simple or slightly branched at the tips and only slightly enlarged at their apices. The ascospores, which are the reproductive spores produced in sacs called asci, are a key diagnostic feature of Transdrakea. They are relatively small, typically measuring around 10–11 μm long by 4–5 μm wide. A distinctive characteristic is their very thin septum, the internal wall that divides the spore into two cells, which is usually only about 1.5 μm thick.

Chemically, Transdrakea lichens contain anthraquinone pigments, with parietin being the dominant compound. This places them in what lichenologists refer to as chemosyndrome A, a classification based on the proportions of different anthraquinones present in the lichen.

== Species ==
Two species are recognised in Transdrakea:

- Transdrakea alacalufes Søchting, Sancho & Arup – The type species of the genus, found in Patagonia and the Falkland Islands.
- Transdrakea schofieldii (C.W.Dodge) Søchting, Sancho & Arup – Originally described as Caloplaca schofieldii, this species occurs in Antarctica, southern Chile, and the Falkland Islands.

The two Transdrakea species can be distinguished by their growth patterns and geographical distributions. T. alacalufes typically has numerous, dispersed apothecia, while T. schofieldii tends to have apothecia aggregated in rock crevices.
