= Sir James Cockburn, 9th Baronet =

British military officer and colonial administrator (1771–1852)

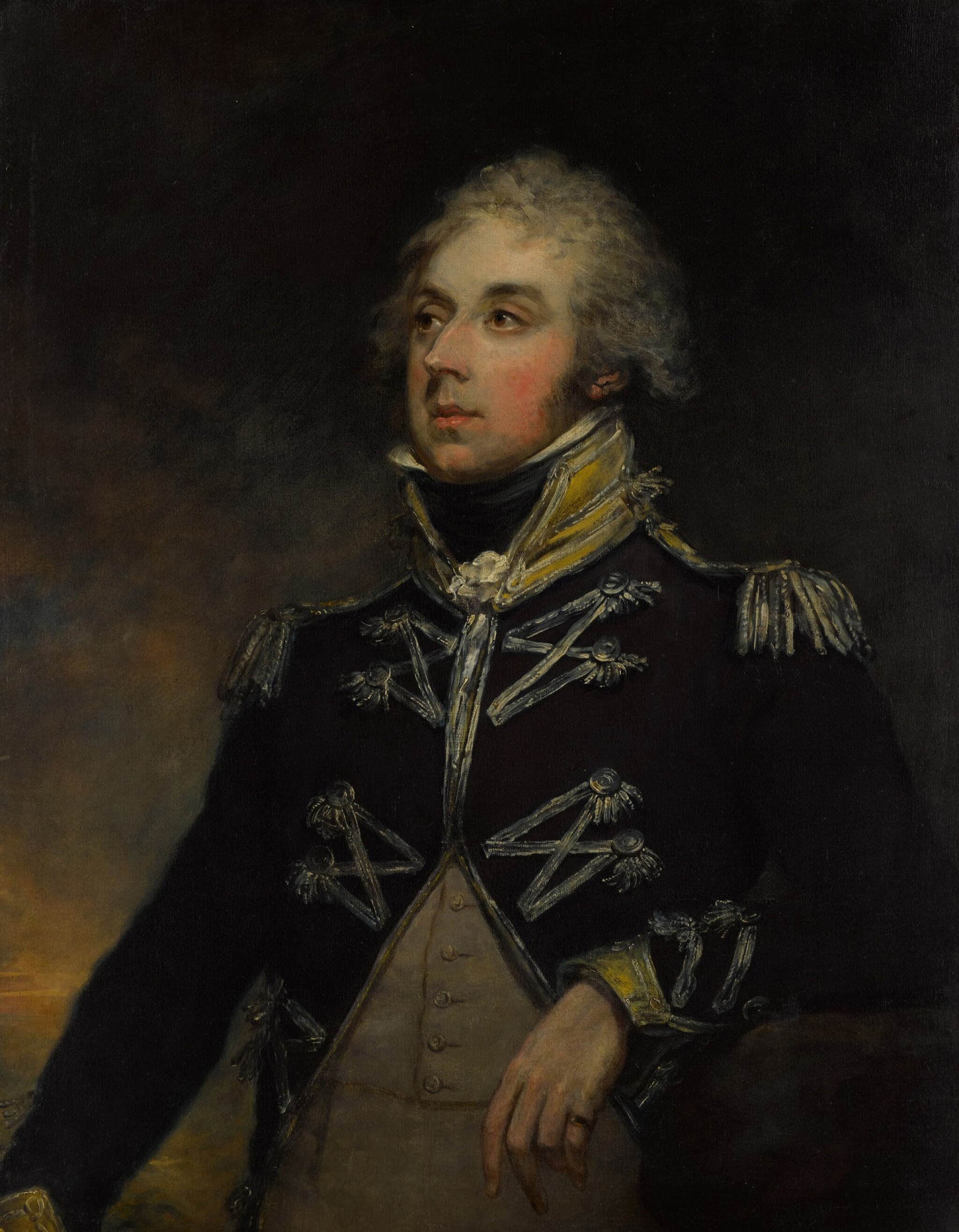
c. 1791–1796 portrait of Cockburn by Arthur William Devis

Major-General Sir James Cockburn, 9th Baronet (21 March 1771 – 26 February 1852) was a British military officer and colonial administrator who thrice served as the governor of Bermuda between 1811 and 1819. He was the eldest son of Sir James Cockburn, 8th Baronet (1729–1804) and his second wife Augusta Anne Ayscough. His maternal grandfather was Francis Ayscough, Dean of Bristol.

His younger brothers were:

- Sir George Cockburn, 10th Baronet (1772–1853), MP and Admiral of the Fleet of the United Kingdom;
- Sir William Cockburn, 11th Baronet (1773–1858), Dean of York; and
- Alexander Cockburn (1776–1852) served as British consul to Hamburg and envoy extraordinary and minister plenipotentiary to Württemberg and the Columbia District. He married Yolande de Vignier, daughter of the vicomte de Vignier, of Santo Domingo, and parented:
  - Sir Alexander Cockburn, 12th Baronet, Lord Chief Justice of England.

Cockburn was commissioned into the British Army's 19th Light Dragoons in 1791 at the rank of cornet. He was soon promoted to lieutenant and served in the regiment for five years until disappearing from the Army List in 1796. On 14 October 1801 Cockburn married Marianna Devereux, a daughter of George Devereux, 13th Viscount Hereford by his wife and possible distant relative Marianna Devereux. They had a daughter, Marianna Augusta Cockburn, who married Sir James Hamilton, 2nd Baronet. Cockburn also served as Paymaster and Inspector General of Marines from 1819 to 1831 and was promoted to major general in 1831. He was appointed the High Sheriff of Carmarthenshire for 1847.

== Sources ==
- Leigh Rayment's list of baronets
- A listing of the Cockburn family.

Government offices
Preceded by Samuel Trott	Governor of Bermuda; 1811–1812	Succeeded by William Smith
Preceded by George Horsford	Governor of Bermuda; 1814–1816	Succeeded by William Smith
Preceded by William Smith	Governor of Bermuda; 1817–1819	Succeeded by William Smith
Political offices
Preceded by E. Cooke	Under-Secretary of State for War and the Colonies with Sir George Shee, Bt; 1806–1807	Succeeded by E. Cooke; Charles Stewart
Baronetage of Nova Scotia
Preceded by James Cockburn	Baronet (of Langton); 1804–1852	Succeeded by George Cockburn
