= Governor Cockburn =

Governor Cockburn may refer to:

- Sir James Cockburn, 9th Baronet (1771–1852), Governor of Bermuda from 1811 to 1812, from 1814 to 1816 and from 1817 to 1819
- Francis Cockburn (1780–1868), Governor of the Bahamas from 1837 to 1844
