= Alexander Cockburn (disambiguation) =

Alexander Cockburn was a political journalist.

Alexander Cockburn may also refer to:

- Sir Alexander Cockburn, 12th Baronet (1802–1880), Scottish lawyer, politician, and judge
- Sir Alexander Cockburn, 6th Baronet (1710–1739) of the Cockburn baronets
- Sir Alexander Cockburn, 7th Baronet (1739–1745) of the Cockburn baronets
- Alexander de Cockburn, Great Seal of Scotland
- Alexander Peter Cockburn (1837–1905), Ontario businessman and political figure

== See also ==
- Alex Coburn, fictional character
- Cockburn (surname)
- Cockburn baronets#Ancestors of the Cockburn baronets
