= George Askew =

George Askew may refer to:

- George Edward Askew (died 1779), English dramatist
- George Askew (Radium line) tugboat built and operated by the Radium line

== See also ==
- George Ayscue (c. 1616–1671), English naval officer
