= Sir Alexander Cockburn, 12th Baronet =

British jurist and politician (1802–1880)

The Right Honourable Sir Alexander Cockburn Bt GCB
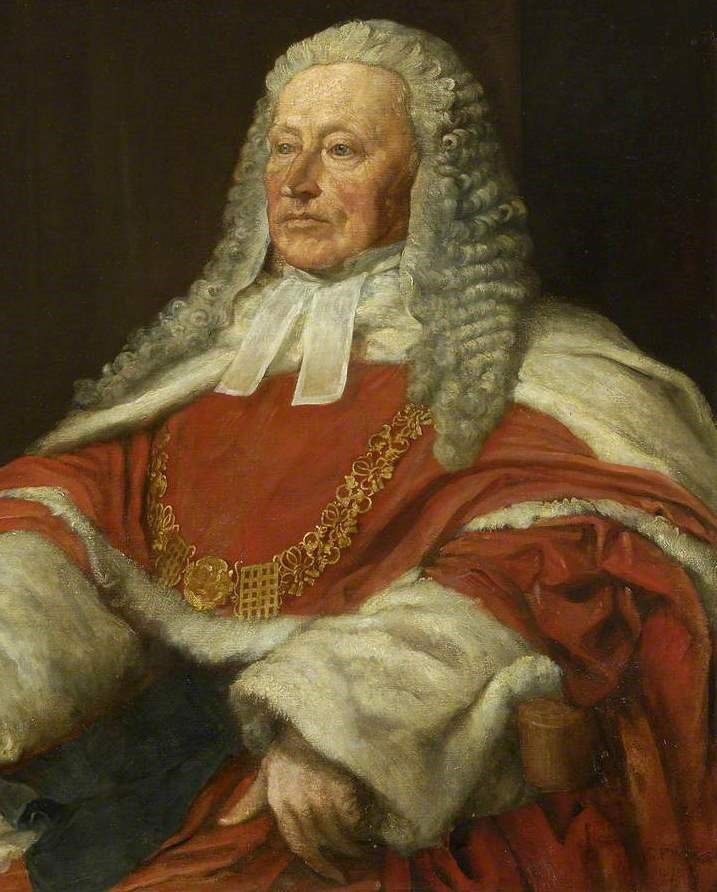
- Portrait by George Frederic Watts

Lord Chief Justice of the Queen's Bench
- In office 24 June 1859 – 20 November 1880
- Monarch: Queen Victoria
- Preceded by: The Lord Campbell
- Succeeded by: The Lord Coleridge; Lord Chief Justice of England

Chief Justice of the Common Pleas
- In office November 1856 – 24 June 1859
- Monarch: Queen Victoria
- Preceded by: Sir John Jervis
- Succeeded by: Sir William Erle

Personal details
- Born: Alexander James Edmund Cockburn; 24 December 1802 Altona, Hamburg; Kingdom of Prussia
- Died: 20 November 1880 (aged 77) 40 Hertford Street, Mayfair, London; United Kingdom
- Resting place: Kensal Green Cemetery; Brent, Greater London; United Kingdom
- Spouse: Amelia (Emily) Godfrey (marriage not found)
- Children: Louisa Charlotte Cockburn; Alexander Dalton Cockburn
- Education: Trinity Hall, Cambridge
- Occupation: Barrister, judge

Sir Alexander James Edmund Cockburn, 12th Baronet GCB (24 December 1802 – 20 November 1880) was a British jurist and politician who served as the Lord Chief Justice for 21 years. He heard some of the leading causes célèbres of the nineteenth century.

In 1847, he decided to stand for parliament, and was elected unopposed as Liberal Member of Parliament for Southampton. His speech in the House of Commons on behalf of the government in the Don Pacifico dispute with Greece commended him to Lord John Russell, who appointed him Solicitor-General in 1850 and Attorney General in 1851, a post which he held till the resignation of the ministry in February 1852.

== Early life and career ==
Cockburn was born in Altona, in what is now Germany and was then part of Brandenburg, to Alexander Cockburn and his wife Yolande, daughter of René Michel de Vignier de La Saline, vicomte de Vignier, of Santo Domingo. His father served as British Consul to Hamburg and the Hanse towns and later as envoy extraordinary and minister plenipotentiary to Württemberg and the Republic of Colombia; he was the fourth son of Sir James Cockburn, 8th Baronet (born c.1729, died July 1804), his three elder brothers having succeeded to the baronetcy, but died without heirs.

He was initially educated largely abroad and became fluent in French and familiar with German, Italian and Spanish. He was educated at Trinity Hall, Cambridge, gaining a first in Civil law in 1824–5 and graduating in 1829 with an LL.B. degree, and also being elected a fellow, and afterwards an honorary fellow. He entered the Middle Temple in 1825, and was called to the bar in 1829. He joined the western circuit and built up a substantial practice though he was sufficiently diffident about his success in London to devote little of his energies there, not even keeping his Chambers open.

== As advocate (1832–1847) ==
Three years after his call, the Reform Bill was passed. Cockburn started to practise in election law, including acting for Henry Lytton Bulwer and Edward Ellice. In 1833, with William Rowe, he published a parliamentary brief on the decisions of election committees. In 1834, Ellice recommended Cockburn as member of the commission to enquire into the state of the corporations of England and Wales. Through his parliamentary work Cockburn met Joseph Parkes and himself became interested in politics as a profession in itself, not simply as a pretext for legal argument. Cockburn had become ambitious and in 1838 he turned down the offer of a judicial appointment in India with the sentiment "I am going in for something better than that". He became Recorder of Southampton and from that point started to reduce his election and parliamentary work in favour of more publicly notorious cases. In 1841 he was made a Q.C.

- Trial of Dr Cockburn: In 1841 a charge of simony, brought against his uncle, William, Dean of York, enabled Cockburn to appear conspicuously in a case which attracted considerable public attention, the proceedings taking the form of a motion for prohibition duly obtained against the ecclesiastical court, which had deprived Dr Cockburn of his office.
- Daniel McNaghten: Sir Robert Peel's secretary, Edward Drummond, was shot by Daniel McNaghten in 1843. Cockburn, briefed on behalf of the assassin, made a speech which helped to establish the insanity defence in Britain for the next century. At the trial, Cockburn had made extensive and effective use of Isaac Ray's Treatise on the Medical Jurisprudence of Insanity. Cockburn quoted extensively from the book which rejected traditional views of the insanity defence based on the defendant's ability to distinguish "right from wrong" in favour of a broader approach based on causation. Cockburn displayed a mastery of the scientific evidence and was an innovator in exploiting forensic science in court.
- The winner of the 1844 Derby: In 1844, he appeared in Wood v. Peel to determine the winner of a bet (the Gaming Act 1845 deemed bets unenforceable in law) as to whether the Derby winner Running Rein was a four-year-old or a three-year-old. Running Rein could not be produced when the judge, Baron Alderson, demanded, and as a result Cockburn lost the case, while his strenuous advocacy of his client's cause had led him into making, in his opening speech, strictures on Lord George Bentinck's conduct in the case which should have been held back.
- Lieutenant Henry Hawkey: In 1846 Hawkey, an officer of the Royal Marines, was tried for murder at Winchester assizes after shooting James Alexander Seton in a duel; Cockburn secured Hawkey's acquittal. James Seton was the last British person to be killed in a duel in the United Kingdom.
- The Achilli trial: During the short administration of Lord Derby, Cockburn was engaged against Sir Frederic Thesiger Attorney General at the time, and for John Henry Newman, in the case of a friar named Giacinto Achilli who had accused Newman of libel. The jury who heard the case under Lord Campbell found that Newman's plea of justification was not proved except in one particular, a verdict which, together with the methods of the judge and the conduct of the audience, attracted considerable comment.

== As law officer of the Crown (1850–1856) ==
Lord John Russell appointed Cockburn as Solicitor-General in 1850, and as Attorney General in 1851, which latter post he held until the resignation of the ministry in February 1852. In December 1852, under Lord Aberdeen's ministry, Cockburn again became Attorney General, and remained so until 1856, taking part in many celebrated trials. In 1854 Cockburn was made Recorder of Bristol.

In 1854, Cockburn was appointed to the Royal Commission for Consolidating the Statute Law, a royal commission to consolidate existing statutes and enactments of English law.

Cockburn shepherded through Parliament the Common Law Procedure Act 1852 and the Common Law Procedure Act 1854.

- William Palmer: In his tenure as Attorney General from 1852 to 1856, he led for the crown in the trial of William Palmer of Rugeley in Staffordshire, an ex-medical man who poisoned a friend named Cook with strychnine in order to steal from his estate. Cockburn made an exhaustive study of the medical aspects of the case and won a conviction after a twelve-day trial, again demonstrating his skill with forensic science.
- The Hopwood will case (1855).
- The Swynfen will case (1856).

== As judge (1856–1880) ==
In 1856, he became Chief Justice of the Common Pleas. He inherited the baronetcy in 1858. In 1859, Lord Campbell became Lord Chancellor, and Cockburn became Lord Chief Justice of the Queen's Bench.

Cockburn always sought out the most sensational cases and was astute in rearranging his diary so that he could sit in any trial likely to attract the attention of the press.

Several Prime Ministers offered to nominate Cockburn for a peerage, and he finally accepted the offer in 1864. However, Queen Victoria refused, noting that "this peerage has been more than once previously refused upon the ground of the notoriously bad moral character of the Chief Justice".

In 1875, the three English common law courts (the Queen's Bench, the Court of Common Pleas, and the Court of the Exchequer) merged to become divisions of the new High Court of Justice. The head of each court (Lord Chief Justice Cockburn, Chief Justice of the Common Pleas Lord Coleridge, and Chief Baron of the Exchequer Sir Fitzroy Kelly) continued in post. After the deaths of Kelly and Cockburn in 1880, the three divisions were merged into a single division, with Lord Coleridge as Lord Chief Justice of England.

- Martin v. Mackonachie: Cockburn sitting in the Queen's Bench division granted a writ to quash Lord Penzance's suspension of Alexander Heriot Mackonochie from his clerical office for breach of the Public Worship Regulation Act 1874. Cockburn's decision was overturned by the Court of Appeal.
- The Tichborne Case: Cockburn presided over the civil case in which Arthur Orton attempted to establish his identity as the missing baronet Sir Roger Tichborne. This trial collapsed after 103 days, the longest civil trial on record. Cockburn then presided over the subsequent trial of Orton for perjury, a famous trial that lasted 188 days, setting a record for criminal trials, of which Cockburn CJ's summing-up occupied eighteen.
- R v. Hicklin: He developed the Hicklin test for obscenity.
- The Alabama claims: He also played a role in the arbitration of the Alabama claims at Geneva in 1872, in which he represented the British government. He dissented from the majority view as to British liability for the actions of British-built privateer ships. He prepared the English translation of the arbitrators' award and published a controversial dissenting opinion in which he admitted British liability for the actions of the CSS Alabama, though not on the grounds given in the award, and discounted liability for the CSS Florida and CSS Shenandoah.
- The Overend-Gurney fraud trial: the trial of the partners of Overend & Gurney, a bank that had collapsed in spectacular circumstances following precarious risks taken by the managers. In his summing up, Cockburn expressed the view that the defendants had been guilty of nothing more than "grave error".
- Woodley v. Metropolitan District Railway Co.: Woodley was set to repair a wall in a darkened railway tunnel in which trains continued to run, without warning or dedicated lookout, and with barely sufficient clearance between train and wall for the workman to make himself safe when a train passed. Woodley was seriously injured when he reached across the rail for a tool and was struck by a passing train. Cockburn CJ held that the employer was not liable, invoking the principle of volenti non fit injuria.
- Lavinia Ryves's claim to be the daughter of Prince Henry, Duke of Cumberland and Strathearn, a claim that ultimately failed after Cockburn CJ told the jury in summing up that Ryves's evidence comprised "outrages on all probability".
- The trial of Michael Barrett for the Clerkenwell explosion.
- The trial of Boulton and Park for transvestism and "conspiring and inciting persons to commit an unnatural offence".
- The trial of Henry Wainwright for murder. The crime, in which Wainwright was arrested in possession of the dismembered body of his victim, was given more publicity at the time than those of Jack the Ripper.
- The Eastbourne manslaughter

== Personality ==
In personal appearance Cockburn was of small stature with a large head, but possessed a very dignified manner. He enjoyed yachting and other sport, and writing (he wrote an unpublished novel). Something of an adventurer in his youth, he was fond of socialising and womanising, fathering two illegitimate children. He "was also throughout his life addicted to frivolities not altogether consistent with advancement in a learned profession, or with the positions of dignity which he successively occupied." He lived for many years in some state at Wakehurst Place in Sussex. In his later years, he reminisced, "Whatever happens, I have had my whack". He once had to escape through the window of the robing room at Rougemont Castle, Exeter, to evade bailiffs. Shortly before he became Chief Justice of the Common Pleas, Cockburn was walking in London's Haymarket with fellow barrister William Ballantine when he saw a police constable roughly handling a woman. The pair stopped to protest but found themselves accused of obstructing a constable in the execution of his duty, arrested by the constable and conveyed to Vine Street Police Station. At the station they met an acquaintance who explained to the inspector who they were and they were released.

He was a champion of the proper role of the advocate and on the occasion of a reception for Antoine Pierre Berryer in Middle Temple Hall, said:

The arms which an advocate wields he ought to use as a warrior, not as an assassin. He ought to uphold the interests of his clients per fas, not per nefas. He ought to know how to reconcile the interests of his clients with the eternal interests of truth and justice.

— The Times, 9 November 1864

As a judge he did not have the highest reputation, with a joke within the legal profession being that he became a first rate judge only because he sat with Lord Blackburn. Charles Francis Adams, Sr., a fellow judge on the Geneva tribunal to resolve the Alabama claims issue, felt that Sir Alexander's temper was so short that he seemed mentally unbalanced.

== Family and death ==
Although Cockburn never married, he had one acknowledged illegitimate son and one illegitimate daughter by the unmarried Amelia (Emily) Godfrey (17 September 1818, baptised 11 October 1818 All Saints' Church, Epping), the daughter of William Daniel Leake Godfrey (1788–1868) and his wife Louisa Hannah (née Dalley, 1791–1852):

1. Louisa Charlotte Cockburn (3 August 1838 Stratford, Essex baptised 16 June 1839 All Saints' Church, West Ham, Essex – Isle of Wight 25 April 1869), who married at Chelsea, London, on 25 June 1863 to the Rev. Charles William Cavendish (Chiswick 24 September 1822 – Ryde, Isle of Wight 21 December 1890), rector of Little Casterton, Rutland, later a Catholic convert who became secretary of the Society for the Propagation of the Faith, and a grandson of George Cavendish, 1st Earl of Burlington, with issue:
  1. Louis Francis John Charles Raphael Cavendish (24 October 1864 – 31 December 1890), who never married
2. Alexander Cockburn Dalton or Alexander Dalton (Alex) Cockburn (Sydenham bapt 10 Sep 1845 – Westminster 16 July 1887 ), Capt. 2nd Regt Life Guards, who never married and to whom Cockburn left the majority of his fortune. His son did not succeed him as Baronet of Langton, which became dormant.

Cockburn died on 20 November 1880, of angina pectoris at his house at 40 Hertford Street, Mayfair, London; he had continued working up until his death despite three heart attacks and warnings from his doctor. As he never married, he produced no legitimate heirs, despite having a surviving male child. As a result, the baronetcy became dormant upon his death. His remains were deposited in Catacomb A of Kensal Green Cemetery.

== Ancestors ==
Ancestors of Sir Alexander Cockburn, 12th Baronet

32. Archibald Cockburn, 4th Bart (died 1705)
16. Alexander Cockburn, 6th Bart (died 1739)
33. Marion Sinclair
8. William Cockburn
17. Mary Ancrum
4. James Cockburn, 8th Bart (1729–1804)
32.
18. James Cockburn (died 1718)
33.
9. Frances Cockburn
2. Alexander Cockburn (1776–1852)
20. Gabriel Ayscough
10. Francis Ayscough (1701–1763)
21. Mary
5. Augusta Anne Ayscough (1749–1837)
44. Charles Lyttelton, 3rd Bart (1628–1716)
22. Thomas Lyttelton, 4th Bart (1686–1751)
45. Anne Temple (died 1718)
11. Anne Lyttelton (1714–1776)
46. Richard Temple, 3rd Bart (1634–1697)
23. Christian Temple
47. Mary Knapp (died 1726)
1. Alexander Cockburn, 12th Bart (1802–1880)
6. René Michel de Vignier de La Saline, vicomte de Vignier
3. Yolande de Vignier (1780–1810)

== Arms ==
Coat of arms of Sir Alexander Cockburn, 12th Baronet

Crest
A cock Proper.
Escutcheon
Quarterly 1st & 4th Gules six mascles Or three two and one 2nd & 3rd Argent three cocks Gules.
Supporters
On either side a lion Gules the sinister guardant.
Motto
Vigilans Et Audax

== Bibliography ==
- Leigh Rayment's Historical List of MPs – Constituencies beginning with "S" (part 3)
- Leigh Rayment's list of baronets – Baronetcies beginning with "C" (part 3)
- Obituaries:
  - The Times, 22 November 1880; 26 November 1880
  - Law Times, 27 November 1880, 68–9
  - Solicitors' Journal, 25 (1880–81), 76–7
- Bucknill, J. C. (1881). "The Late Lord Chief Justice of England on Lunacy". Brain. 4 (1): 1–26. doi:10.1093/brain/4.1.1.
- Diamond, B. L. (1956). "Isaac Ray and the trial of Daniel M'Naghten". American Journal of Psychiatry. 112 (8): 651–656. doi:10.1176/ajp.112.8.651. PMID 13292555.
- Diamond, Michael (2004). Victorian Sensation: Or, the Spectacular, the Shocking and the Scandalous in Nineteenth-Century Britain. Anthem Press. ISBN 1-84331-150-X.
- Foulkes, N. (2010). Gentlemen and Blackguards: Gambling Mania and Plot to Steal the Derby of 1844. London: Weidenfeld & Nicolson. p. Ch.17–19. ISBN 978-0-297-84459-4.
- Hamilton, John Andrew (1887). "Cockburn, Alexander James Edmund" . In Stephen, Leslie (ed.). Dictionary of National Biography. Vol. 11. London: Smith, Elder & Co.
- Kingston, C. (1923). Famous Judges and Famous Trials. London: Stanley Paul & Co. p. Ch.9. ISBN 0-8377-2336-1.
- Lobban, M. (2004) "Cockburn, Sir Alexander James Edmund, twelfth baronet (1802–1880)", Oxford Dictionary of National Biography, Oxford University Press, accessed 24 July 2007 (subscription, Wikipedia Library access or UK public library membership required)
- Russell, C. (1894). "Reminiscences of Lord Chief Justice Coleridge". North American Review: September.
- Veeder, Van Vechten (1900). "Sir Alexander Cockburn". Harvard Law Review. 14 (2). Harvard Law Review, Vol. 14, No. 2: 79–97. doi:10.2307/1323051. JSTOR 1323051.

Parliament of the United Kingdom
Preceded by Humphrey Mildmay; George William Hope	Member of Parliament for Southampton; 1847 – 1857; With: Brodie Willcox	Succeeded by Thomas Matthias Weguelin; Brodie Willcox
Legal offices
Preceded by Sir John Romilly	Solicitor General; 1850–1851	Succeeded by Sir William Page Wood
Preceded by Sir John Romilly	Attorney General; 1851–1852	Succeeded by Sir Frederic Thesiger
Preceded by Sir Frederic Thesiger	Attorney General; 1852–1856	Succeeded by Sir Richard Bethell
Preceded by Sir John Jervis	Chief Justice of the Common Pleas; 1856–1859	Succeeded by Sir William Erle
Preceded by The Lord Campbell	Lord Chief Justice of the Queen's Bench; 1859–1880	Succeeded by The Lord Coleridge as Lord Chief Justice of England
Baronetage of Nova Scotia
Preceded by William Cockburn	Baronet (of Langton); 1858–1880	Dormant
