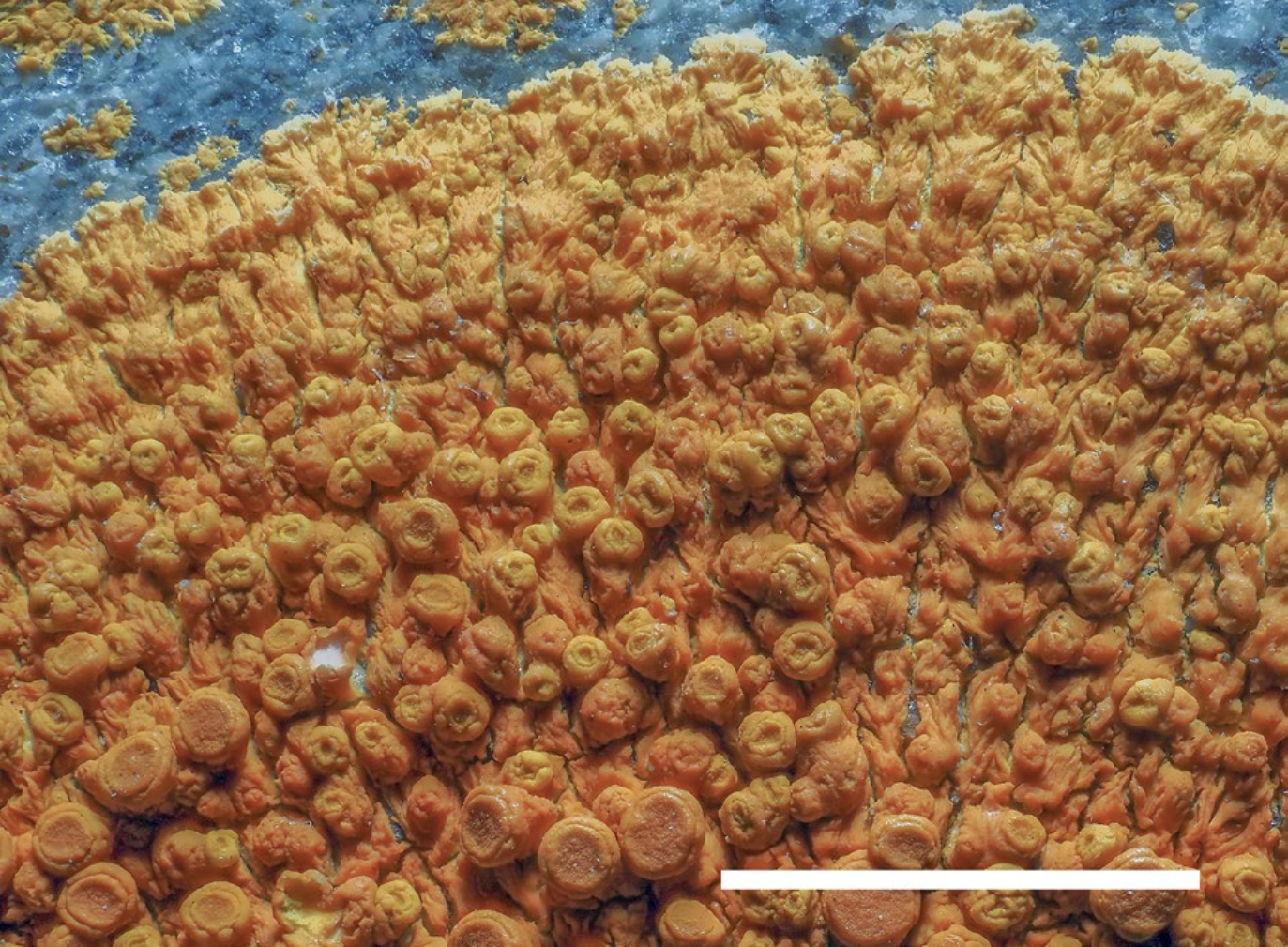
- Gondwania joannae; scale bar = 2 mm

Scientific classification
- Domain: Eukaryota
- Kingdom: Fungi
- Division: Ascomycota
- Class: Lecanoromycetes
- Order: Teloschistales
- Family: Teloschistaceae
- Genus: Gondwania; Søchting, Frödén & Arup (2013)

Type species
- Gondwania cribrosa (Hue) Søchting, Frödén & Arup (2013)

Species
- G. cribrosa G. inclinans G. joannae G. sejongensis G. sublobulata

Synonyms
- Diblastia Trevis. (1857)

= Gondwania =

Genus of lichens

Gondwania is a genus of lichen-forming fungi in the subfamily Xanthorioideae of the family Teloschistaceae. It comprises five species of crustose lichens.

== Taxonomy ==
The genus was circumscribed by the lichenologists Ulrik Søchting, Patrik Frödén, and Ulf Arup in 2013. The type species is G. cribrosa, a species that was first named Polycauliona cribrosa by Auguste-Marie Hue in 1909. The genus name refers to the ancestral supercontinent Gondwana, reflecting the predominantly Southern Hemisphere distribution of the genus.

Gondwania belongs to the subfamily Xanthorioideae within the family Teloschistaceae. Molecular phylogenetics analyses place Gondwania in a clade with several other Southern Hemisphere genera, including Austroplaca, Cerothallia, and Transdrakea. Within this clade, Gondwania forms a well-supported monophyletic group.

== Description ==
Gondwania species are grow on rock, with one exception that is corticolous (growing on bark). They exhibit a variety of growth forms: lobate, somewhat fruticose, or crustose. The thalli of some species feature pseudocyphellae, which are small pores in the upper cortex that appear as slightly paler spots on the surface. Apothecia (fruiting bodies) in Gondwania are typically lecanorine to zeorine in form, ranging from 0.5 to 6 mm in diameter. The disc colour varies from orange to brownish-orange. The margin is often well-developed and can be pseudocyphellate in some species.

Microscopically, Gondwania species have asci of the Teloschistes-type, each containing eight spores. The ascospores are polaridiblastic (with two cells divided by a septum) and generally ellipsoid. Spore sizes and septum widths vary among species and can be diagnostic features.

Species contain lichen products characteristic of chemosyndrome A, with parietin being the dominant anthraquinone (comprising 92–95% of the total). All yellow, orange or reddish-pigmented parts of the lichen turn purple when exposed to potassium hydroxide solution (K+ purple reaction).

Cerothallis, Austroplaca, and Transdrakea are closely related genera in the Teloschistaceae. Gondwania has a Southern Hemisphere distribution, occurring in Antarctica, southern Australia (particularly Tasmania), New Zealand, and Patagonia, including the Falkland Islands. This distribution pattern suggests an origin in the ancient Gondwana supercontinent, with subsequent diversification following the breakup of the landmass.

== Species ==
- Gondwania cribrosa (Hue) Søchting, Frödén & Arup (2013) – Tasmania; New Zealand
- Gondwania inclinans (Stirton) Søchting (2023) – New Zealand
- Gondwania joannae (Hue) Søchting, Sancho & Arup (2023) – Antarctica
- Gondwania sejongensis S.Y.Kondr. & Hur (2014)
- Gondwania sublobulata (Nyl.) S.Y.Kondr., Kärnefelt, Elix, A.Thell, Jung Kim, M.H.Jeong, N.N.Yu, A.S.Kondr. & Hur (2014) – South America

The proposed taxon Gondwania regalis (Vain.) Søchting, Frödén & Arup (2013) has since been transferred to a different genus and is now known as Polycauliona regalis.
