= Austroplaca thisbe =

Scientific classification
- Domain: Eukaryota
- Kingdom: Fungi
- Division: Ascomycota
- Class: Lecanoromycetes
- Order: Teloschistales
- Family: Teloschistaceae
- Genus: Austroplaca
- Species: A. thisbe

Binomial name
- Austroplaca thisbe Søchting, Sancho & Arup (2023)

Species of lichen

Austroplaca thisbe is a twig-growing species of lichen native to southern Patagonia. This species belongs to the family Teloschistaceae, which was critically studied in the 2010s. A. thisbe is a small (0.2–0.5 mm) vivid yellow flat disc-shaped lichen with a constricted base. Twig lichen, and the Teloschistaceae family in particular, suffer greatly from poor air quality, therefore the clean air of Patagonia, and specifically Tierra del Fuego of the Falkland Islands have become a haven for many species of lichen not normally seen in more polluted environments.
