= Austroplaca hookeri =

Scientific classification
- Domain: Eukaryota
- Kingdom: Fungi
- Division: Ascomycota
- Class: Lecanoromycetes
- Order: Teloschistales
- Family: Teloschistaceae
- Genus: Austroplaca
- Species: A. hookeri

Binomial name
- Austroplaca hookeri (C.W.Dodge) Søchting, Frödén & Arup (2013)

Synonyms
- Gasparrinia hookeri C.W.Dodge (1965); Caloplaca hookeri (C.W.Dodge) Søchting, Øvstedal & Sancho (2004)

Species of lichen

Austroplaca hookeri is a species of saxicolous (rock-dwelling), crustose lichen in the family Teloschistaceae. It was originally described by Carroll William Dodge in 1965, as Gasparrinia hookeri. The type specimen was originally collected by British botanist and explorer Joseph Dalton Hooker on Cockburn Island; the species is named in his honour. The taxon was transferred to the large genus Caloplaca in 2004, and again to the genus Austroplaca in 2013 as part of a restructuring of the family Teloschistaceae.

The lichen forms rosettes up to 2.5 cm (1 in) in diameter. Its thallus is typically orange, although the colour is yellow in shaded areas. The lobes at the margins of the thallus are up to 1.5 mm long and 0.5 mm wide. Austroplaca hookeri occurs on rocky seashores of the Antarctic Peninsula, Falkland Islands, and South Shetland Islands in maritime Antarctica.
