= Cerothallia yorkensis =

Scientific classification
- Kingdom: Fungi
- Division: Ascomycota
- Class: Lecanoromycetes
- Order: Teloschistales
- Family: Teloschistaceae
- Genus: Cerothallia
- Species: C. yorkensis

Binomial name
- Cerothallia yorkensis (S.Y.Kondr. & Kärnefelt) Arup, Frödén & Søchting (2013)

Synonyms
- Caloplaca yorkensis S.Y.Kondr. & Kärnefelt (2011)

Species of lichen

Cerothallia yorkensis is a species of crustose lichen in the family Teloschistaceae. Originally described in 2004 under the name Caloplaca yorkensis, it was later moved to the genus Cerothallia in 2013 based on genetic and structural studies. The lichen forms thin, greyish crusts on limestone rocks and produces small, bright yellow-orange reproductive discs. It is found exclusively in southern Australia, growing on coastal limestone outcrops from Western Australia to Tasmania.

== Taxonomy ==
The lichen now known as Cerothallia yorkensis was first described in 2004 as Caloplaca yorkensis by Sergey Kondratyuk and Ingvar Kärnefelt, from material gathered on limestone outcrops near Edithburgh on South Australia's Yorke Peninsula—hence the specific epithet. Molecular and morphological studies later demonstrated that many grey-thallus, yellow-apotheciate members of Caloplaca form a separate lineage; in 2013 Arup, Frödén and Søchting transferred these species to the newly erected genus Cerothallia, placing C. yorkensis among them. Within the genus the species is distinctive for its thin, largely immersed thallus, small biatorine apothecia and especially narrow one-septate ascospores only 3.5–5.5 micrometres (μm) wide. These features separate it from limestone-dwelling allies such as C. lactea and C. brachyspora, both of which possess broader spores and a more strongly developed thallus.

== Description ==
Cerothallia yorkensis forms inconspicuous crusts that range from a few millimetres to two centimetres across, often coalescing into larger colonies. The thallus blends with the rock surface: at the margins it is almost endolithic, while towards the centre it becomes a plane to slightly convex mosaic of grey or grey-brown areoles up to about 0.7 mm wide and 0.3 mm thick. Scattered across these areoles are numerous dull yellow-orange apothecia, each 0.3–0.6 mm in diameter. The apothecia are biatorine, meaning they lack a thalline rim and are bordered only by a pale yellow proper margin that soon recedes; the disc itself is plane to gently domed and may age to brownish orange. In section the true exciple is 30–50 μm thick laterally and up to 70 μm at the base, merging into a colourless hymenium 50–60 μm high. Paraphyses are thread-like, swelling to 4–5 μm at the tips, and the asci commonly contain fewer than eight spores. Mature ascospores are ellipsoid, 9–12 μm long, with a single thin septum 2–4 μm wide and only a slight swelling at the septum. A potassium hydroxide test on the epihymenium produces a crimson-purple flush, indicating the presence of parietin and related anthraquinones.

== Habitat and distribution ==
The species is restricted to southern Australia, with confirmed records from coastal and near-coastal limestone in Western Australia, South Australia, Victoria and Tasmania. It favours well-lit, wind-exposed outcrops, colonising both level pavements and the vertical faces of low cliffs. The thallus anchors firmly to the weathered surface and often grows intermingled with other teloschistoid crusts such as Caloplaca johnwhinrayi. It has also been recorded from Kangaroo Island, often growing near Flavoplaca mereschkowskiana and Xanthocarpia jerramungupensis.
