= Lady Cockburn and Her Three Eldest Sons =

Painting by Joshua Reynolds

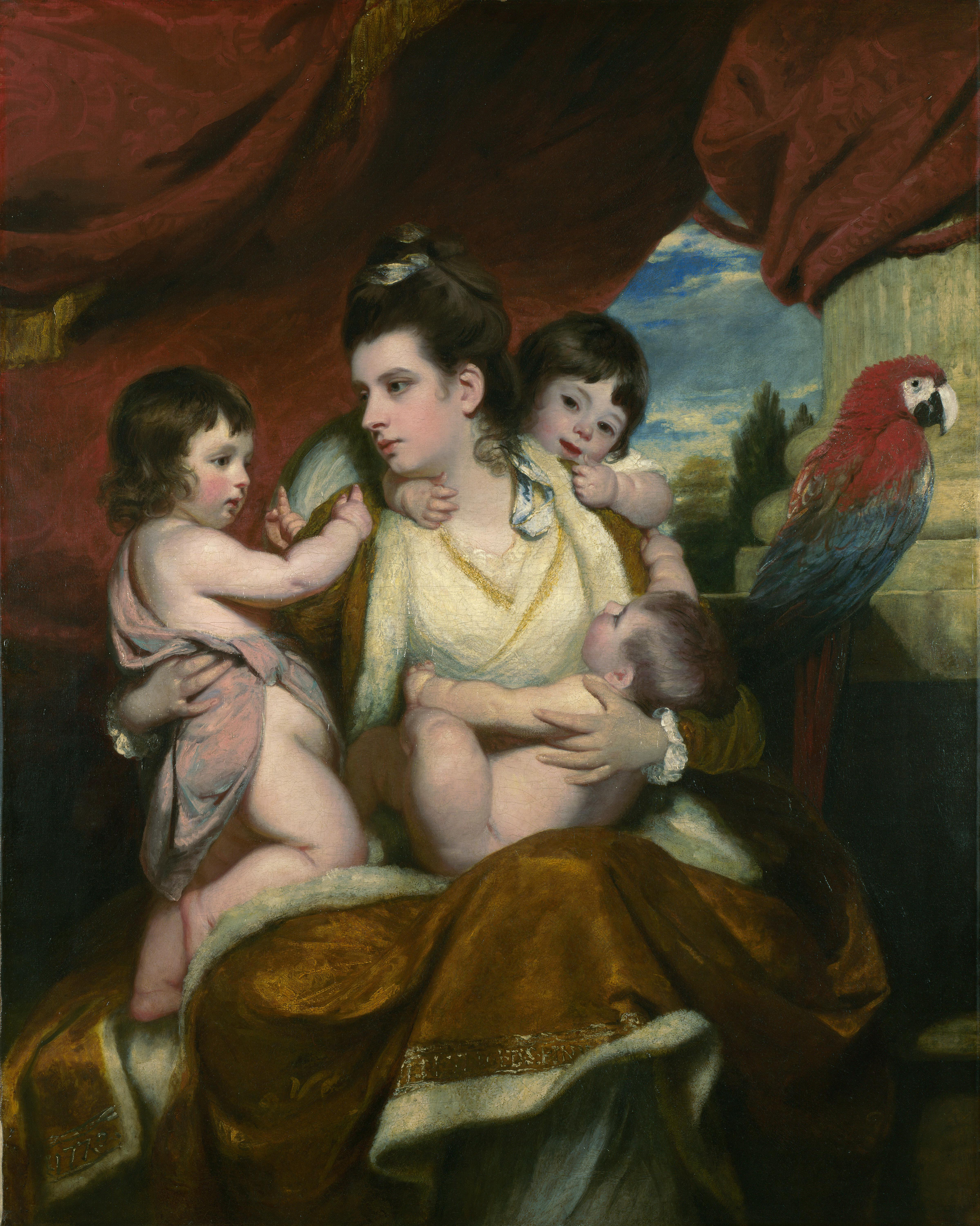
- Artist: Joshua Reynolds
- Year: 1773–1775
- Medium: oil on canvas
- Dimensions: 141.5 cm × 113 cm (55.7 in × 44 in)
- Location: National Gallery, London

Lady Cockburn and Her Three Eldest Sons (1775) is an oil on canvas portrait by Joshua Reynolds. Work began on the picture in 1773, and, in Grand Manner fashion, Reynolds exploited two classical paintings: the attitude of the child on the left was modelled on Cupid in Velázquez's Toilet of Venus whilst the general composition was inspired by Anthony van Dyck's Charity. The painting passed to Mister Cockburn's son George, and then to his daughter, Mrs Hamilton, the wife of Sir James Hamilton. It was bequeathed to London's National Gallery in 1906. The painting is one of the few signed by Reynolds: Lady Cockburn's dress bears his signature and the year 1775.

Lady Cockburn (Augusta Anne Ayscough, 1749–1837) was the daughter of Francis Ayscough and his wife Anne. She married Sir James Cockburn (/ˈkoʊbərn/, Scottish English: [ˈkobʌɾn]), the 8th Baronet of Langton, and became Lady Cockburn of Langton in Berwick in 1769. The marriage was made as the result of a large marriage settlement of twenty thousand pounds which was arranged by her maternal uncle, Sir George Lyttlelton, her widowed mother, and her brother George Edward Ayscough. The money was raised on her father's estate and included three houses in London and two farms.

Lady Cockburn's first three sons are depicted in the portrait painted by Joshua Reynolds titled "Lady Cockburn and Her Three Eldest Sons". The first son, James (b. 1771), became the 9th baronet and Governor of Bermuda (1811–19), and her second son, George (b. 1772) became an Admiral of the Fleet and the 10th Baronet. Her third son, William (b. 1773) became the Dean of York, and her fourth son, Alexander (b. 1776), became British envoy extraordinary and minister plenipotentiary to Württemberg and the Columbia District whilst her fifth son, Francis, (b. 1776) became a general after being involved in the early history of Canada as a colony and serving in diplomatic positions in the Bahamas and British Honduras. Lady Cockburn's daughter, Augusta, was wed in 1807.

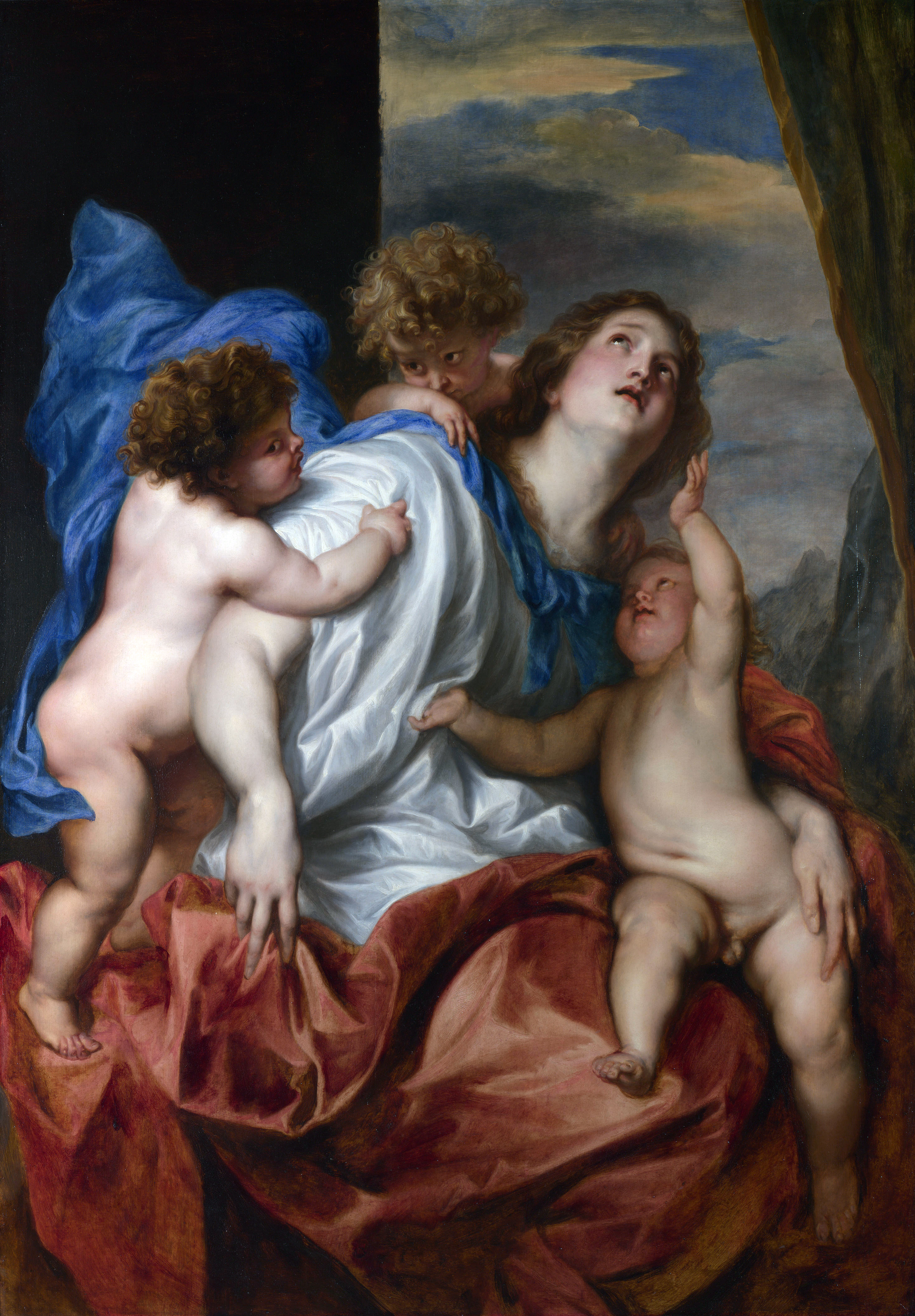
Charity (1627–28) by Anthony van Dyck
