= Austroplaca soropelta =

Scientific classification
- Domain: Eukaryota
- Kingdom: Fungi
- Division: Ascomycota
- Class: Lecanoromycetes
- Order: Teloschistales
- Family: Teloschistaceae
- Genus: Austroplaca
- Species: A. soropelta

Binomial name
- Austroplaca soropelta (E.S.Hansen, Poelt & Søchting) Søchting, Frödén & Arup (2013)

Synonyms
- Caloplaca citrina var. soropelta E.S.Hansen (1987); Caloplaca soropelta (E.S.Hansen, Poelt & Søchting) Søchting (1992)

Species of lichen

Austroplaca soropelta is a species of saxicolous and muscicolous (rock- and moss-dwelling), crustose lichen in the family Teloschistaceae. It has a bipolar distribution, meaning it occurs in polar areas of both the Northern and Southern Hemispheres.

== Taxonomy ==
The lichen was first formally described in 1987 by the lichenologists Eric-Steen Hansen, Josef Poelt, and Ulrik Søchting in 1987; they initially classified it as a variety of Caloplaca citrina, a lichen now known as Flavoplaca citrina. The type specimen was collected from Greenland, specifically on the rocky slopes northeast of the Arctic Station Godhavn in Disko Island. The specimen was found growing on basalt, within the south-facing protected crevices of a bird cliff, at an elevation of about 20 m (66 ft). In 1992, Søchting promoted it to species status as Caloplaca soropelta. A little more than two decades later, Søchting and colleagues transferred it to the genus Austroplaca following a molecular phylogenetics-informed restructuring of the family Teloschistaceae.

== Description ==
Austroplaca soropelta is a species of lichen that forms crust-like structures, ranging up to 2 cm in size, on mosses or rocks. The thallus, which is the main body of the lichen, can either be shield-like (peltate) or scale-like (squamulose). The scale-like parts, or squamules, are typically regular in shape and sometimes have broad lobes, measuring up to 1.2 mm. These squamules often start out highly convex and later become flat or slightly concave. They have an orange-yellow colour, with the edges frequently curled upwards.

A distinctive feature of Austroplaca soropelta is the presence of soralia, which are specialised propagules for asexual reproduction. These soralia are lip-shaped and merge, forming along the lower sides of the squamules. They expose golden-yellow soredia, which are granular clusters of algal cells and fungal filaments. In some instances, this lichen can develop into a uniformly sorediate (covered in soredia) crust. The soredia are sized between 25 and 35 μm in diameter. Pycnidia, which are flask-shaped structures producing asexual spores, have not been observed in this species.

Secondary metabolites (lichen products) that occur in this species are parietin as a major substance, and smaller concentrations of emodin, fallacinal, parietinic acid, and teloschistin. This suite of chemicals corresponds to the chemosyndrome A as previously elaborated by Søchting.

== Habitat and distribution ==
In terms of ecology, Austroplaca soropelta has varied growth patterns depending on its location. On the Antarctic continent, this species predominantly grows on strongly convex moss cushions. There, it is commonly found in the company of Gallowayella borealis and Caloplaca flava, and often alongside Austroplaca darbishirei. In contrast, in Tierra del Fuego and the Northern Hemisphere, Austroplaca soropelta adopts a saxicolous (rock-dwelling) habit, preferring the shelter of crevices. In these environments, it anchors its squamules using hyphal strands.

The species was initially described from Greenland and has subsequently been identified in other Arctic locations such as Svalbard and Iceland. More recent discoveries have extended its known range to Antarctica, specifically in Victoria Land. There have been also a few collections from the southernmost regions of Argentina and Chile.
