= Christian Advocate (University of Cambridge) =

Christian Advocate was a term used to refer to the University of Cambridge's Hulsean Lecturer until 1860. The Hulsean Preacher is charged with the annual task of delivering an address to answer objections against Christianity. The post was inaugurated in 1803 with William Cockburn as the first holder. The Hulsean sermon was instituted by John Hulse of Cheshire in 1777.
