= Francis Cockburn =

British military officer (1780–1868)

Lieutenant-General Sir Francis Cockburn (/ˈkoʊkbərn/; 10 November 1780 – 24 August 1868) was a British colonial administrator who served in the British Army, and played an important role in the early settlement of eastern Canada.

== Early life and marriage ==
Cockburn was born in England in 1780. He was the fifth and last son of Sir James Cockburn, 8th Baronet (1729–1804) and his second wife Augusta Anne Ayscough. His maternal grandfather was Francis Ayscough, Dean of Bristol and Royal tutor.

On 19 November 1804, at Harbledown, Kent, England, he married Alicia Arabella (1782–1854), daughter of Richard Sandys, a descendant of Archbishop Sandys.

== Military and colonial career ==
He had first joined the 7th Dragoon Guards at the age of 19 and served in South America and the Iberian Peninsula. Following his marriage, he was sent to Canada in 1811 as a captain in the Canadian Fencibles and fought in the War of 1812 against the United States. He served with the Quartermaster-General for Upper Canada at York and Kingston. In 1815, he became assistant quartermaster-general for Upper Canada and assisted in settling immigrants near Perth in the Bathurst District.

In 1818, he became deputy quartermaster-general for Upper and Lower Canada. He helped establish military settlements at Perth, Richmond, Lanark, the Bay of Quinte, Glengarry County and on the Saint-François River in Lower Canada. He also founded a village at Franktown, Ontario. In 1819, he accompanied the Duke of Richmond on the tour of Perth and Richmond which led to the Duke's death.

He returned to England in 1823. During his time there, he helped establish the price of lands for properties in Upper Canada and provided advice on the best locations for settlement in the region.

He served as superintendent of British Honduras from 1830 to 1837 and Governor of the Bahamas from 1837 to 1844. Cockburn Town, the largest settlement on San Salvador Island in the Bahamas, was named after him, as was Cockburn Island in Ontario and Cockburn Town, the capital of the Turks and Caicos Islands.

Cockburn was knighted by Letters Patent on 8 Sept 1841. He was promoted to the rank of Lieutenant-General in 1860.

== Death ==
Cockburn died in 1868 and was buried at Harbledown, Kent, where he had married, on 29 August 1868.

Government offices
Preceded by Alexander MacDonald	Superintendent of British Honduras; 1830–1837	Succeeded by Alexander MacDonald
Preceded by William Macbean George Colebrooke	Governor of the Bahamas; 1837–1844	Succeeded by George Mathew
Military offices
Preceded by Sir John Bell	Colonel of the 95th (Derbyshire) Regiment of Foot; 1853–1868	Succeeded by John ffolliott Crofton
