= Austroplaca =

Scientific classification
- Kingdom: Fungi
- Division: Ascomycota
- Class: Lecanoromycetes
- Order: Teloschistales
- Family: Teloschistaceae
- Genus: Austroplaca; Søchting, Frödén & Arup (2013)

Type species
- Austroplaca ambitiosa (Darb.) Søchting, Frödén & Arup (2013)

Genus of lichen-forming fungi

Austroplaca is a genus of lichen-forming fungi in the family Teloschistaceae. It comprises 13 species. These lichens are found primarily in the coldest regions of the Southern Hemisphere, including Antarctica, sub-Antarctic islands, and the southern tips of South America. Most species grow on rocks in harsh, windswept environments.

== Taxonomy ==
The genus was circumscribed in 2013 by Ulrik Søchting, Patrik Frödén, and Ulf Arup, with Austroplaca ambitiosa assigned as the type species. The generic name means "southern disc". Molecular and morphological evidence indicate that Austroplaca is monophyletic; that is, its species form a single evolutionary lineage. It appears most closely related to two other Southern Hemisphere genera, Gondwania and Cerothallia. Gondwania chiefly shows a southern circumpolar distribution, in contrast to the Antarctic–Subantarctic–Patagonian range typical of Austroplaca, but the three genera otherwise span similar morphological and anatomical variation. Cerothallia differs in having spores with a short internal cross-wall (septum) and a poorly developed, grey, crustose thallus.

Across analyses, these taxa do not consistently form a single, well-supported clade, and they cannot be united without also absorbing Xanthopeltis, Caloplaca altoandina, and several undescribed species. The authors considered that option but judged it would erase useful information carried by current genus names: for example, that Cerothallia comprises species with short-septate spores and weakly developed thalli, whereas Xanthopeltis sensu stricto has an umbilicate thallus (attached at one central point), immersed apothecia (sunken fruiting bodies), and narrow, one-septate, S-shaped spores. They therefore preferred to retain at least four genera rather than collapse them into one.

== Description ==
Most species of Austroplaca form low, circular rosettes with somewhat lobed edges. A minority are microfruticose: minute, shrubby thalli with tiny upright bumps (papillae), as in A. erecta. Others are crustose with a radiating, lobed outline (effigurate), or break into small, shield-like plates (peltate areoles) that often grow on moss or plant debris, for example A. darbishirei. The upper surface (thallus cortex) commonly shows pseudocyphellae—fine pores or cracks that appear as pale specks and promote gas exchange. Only a few species produce soredia, the powdery propagules used for vegetative reproduction; examples include A. darbishirei and the high-latitude, bipolar A. soropelta (occurring in both polar regions).

The fruiting bodies are apothecia of the zeorine type: small discs edged by a margin formed from both the lichen thallus and the inner apothecial wall. The ascospores are typically two-celled, separated by a medium to broad cross-wall (septum). Chemically, species fall into chemosyndrome A or A3, indicating a characteristic, genus-typical suite of secondary metabolites used in Teloschistaceae classification.

== Species ==
As of September 2025, Species Fungorum (in the Catalogue of Life) accept 11 species of Austroplaca.

- Austroplaca ambitiosa (Darb.) Søchting, Frödén & Arup (2013)
- Austroplaca cirrochrooides (Vain.) Søchting, Frödén & Arup (2013)
- Austroplaca darbishirei (C.W.Dodge & G.E.Baker) Søchting, Frödén & Arup (2013)
- Austroplaca erecta (Arup & H.Mayrhofer) Søchting, Frödén & Arup (2013)
- Austroplaca frigida Søchting & Garrido-Ben. (2014) – Antarctica
- Austroplaca hookeri (C.W.Dodge) Søchting, Frödén & Arup (2013)
- Austroplaca imperialis Søchting, Sancho & Arup (2023)
- Austroplaca johnstonii (C.W.Dodge) Søchting, Frödén & Arup (2013)
- Austroplaca lucens (Nyl.) Søchting, Frödén & Arup (2013)
- Austroplaca millegrana (Müll.Arg.) Søchting, Frödén & Arup (2013)
- Austroplaca sibirica (H.Magn.) Søchting & Arup (2021)
- Austroplaca soropelta (E.S.Hansen, Poelt & Søchting) Søchting, Frödén & Arup (2013)
- Austroplaca thisbe Søchting, Sancho & Arup (2023) – Argentina
