= Cerothallia yarraensis =

Scientific classification
- Kingdom: Fungi
- Division: Ascomycota
- Class: Lecanoromycetes
- Order: Teloschistales
- Family: Teloschistaceae
- Genus: Cerothallia
- Species: C. yarraensis

Binomial name
- Cerothallia yarraensis (S.Y.Kondr. & Kärnefelt) S.Y.Kondr., Kärnefelt, Elix, A.Thell, Jung Kim, M.H.Jeong, N.N.Yu, A.S.Kondr. & Hur (2014)

Synonyms
- Caloplaca yarraensis S.Y. Kondr. & Kärnefelt (2009)

Species of lichen

Cerothallia yarraensis is a species of corticolous (bark-dwelling), crustose lichen in the family Teloschistaceae. Found in Australia, it was formally described as a new species in 2009 by lichenologists Sergey Kondratyuk and Ingvar Kärnefelt, as Caloplaca yarraensis. Kondratyuk and colleagues transferred it to the genus Cerothallia in 2014.

The lichen has a small, indistinct grey to dark grey thallus measuring 2–9 mm in diameter, raised apothecia, and a well-developed thalline exciple. The type specimen was collected on the eastern edge of Yarra Yarra Lake near Carnamah; the species epithet yarraensis refers to this location. At the type locality, the lichen was found growing on twigs of the plant Halsarcia. It has also been recorded growing on Banksia and Leucopogon parviflorus. Associated lichen species include Caloplaca wilsonii and C. kaernefeltii. Cerothallia yarraensis occurs in a few localities in Western Australia, Tasmania, and Victoria.
