= Sir James Cockburn, 8th Baronet =

British politician (1729-1804)

Sir James Cockburn, 8th Baronet (1729 – 26 July 1804) was a British politician who represented Linlithgow Burghs in the House of Commons of Great Britain from 1772 to 1784. He was also a director of the East India Company.

== Family ==
He was a son of William Cockburn of Berwickshire and his wife and first cousin Frances Cockburn. His paternal grandparents were Sir Alexander Cockburn, 6th Baronet and his wife Mary Ancrum. His maternal grandfather was Dr James Cockburn of Jamaica.

Alexander and Dr James Cockburn were brothers. They were both sons of Sir Archibald Cockburn, 4th Baronet and his wife Marion Sinclair.

Marion Sinclair was a daughter of John Sinclair and Isabel Boyd. Her paternal grandfather was John Sinclair (d. 1649) and his wife Marion McCath.

== Career ==
Cockburn joined the London firm of Henry Douglas, a wealthy merchant and his future father in law. He was a commissary to the Army in Germany during the Seven Years' War and appointed Commissary General in 1762, after which he returned to London and became involved in the purchase of West Indian slave plantations and in East India politics. In 1767 he was elected a Director of the East India Company (until 1769). He was re-elected in 1770 and in the following two years. In 1772 he was also elected to Parliament to represent Linlithgow, a seat he retained until 1784. He had bought the heritable position of Principal Usher of the White Rod in Scotland in 1766.

== Baronetcy ==
His paternal grandfather Sir Alexander Cockburn, 6th Baronet died in May, 1739. Having survived his oldest son Archibald Cockburn, Alexander was succeeded by the eldest son of Archibald as Sir Alexander Cockburn, 7th Baronet.

The 7th Baronet died childless in 1745. James was his closest surviving male relative and thus succeeded his first cousin as the 8th Baronet.

== Marriages and children ==
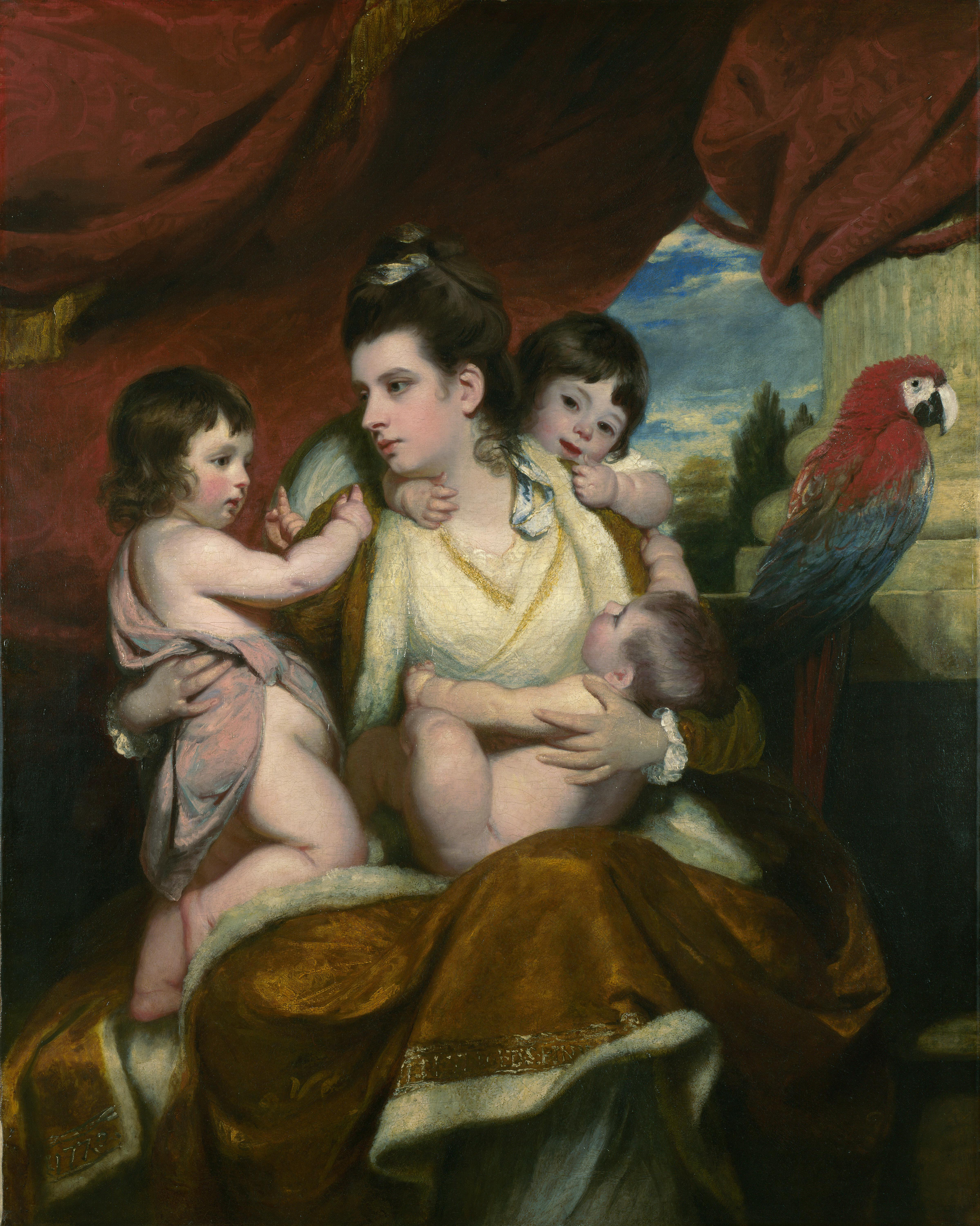
Portrait of Lady Cockburn and her Three Eldest Sons , by Joshua Reynolds.

In 1755 James married his first wife Mary Douglas, the daughter of his business partner Henry Douglas of Friarshaw. They had three daughters:

- Frances Cockburn.
- Harriet Jane Cockburn, who married James Nicholas Duntze, son of Sir John Duntze, Baronet
- Mary Cockburn.

His first wife died on 5 April 1766. He remained a widower for three years. On 10 October 1769), Cockburn married his second wife Augusta Anne Ayscough. She was a daughter of Francis Ayscough, Dean of Bristol and Royal tutor. They had six children:

- Sir James Cockburn, 9th Baronet (1771–1852), Governor of Bermuda.
- Sir George Cockburn, 10th Baronet (1772–1853), MP, Rear-Admiral of the United Kingdom, Admiral of the Fleet and First Sea Lord.
- Sir William Cockburn, 11th Baronet (1773–1858), Dean of York, who married Elizabeth (died 1828), daughter of Sir Robert Peel.
- Alexander Cockburn (1776–1852) served as British Consul to Hamburg and the Hanse towns and later as envoy extraordinary and minister plenipotentiary to Württemberg and the Republic of Colombia. He married Yolande, daughter of the René Michel de Vignier de La Saline, vicomte de Vignier, of Santo Domingo.
- Sir Francis Cockburn (1780–1868), a Lieutenant-General in the Army.
- Anna Augusta Cockburn. Married Charles Hawkins, Rector of Kelston and Prebendary of York.

== Bibliography ==
- Leigh Rayment's list of baronets
- A listing of the Cockburn family.
- Pedigree of the Cockburn family.

Parliament of Great Britain
Preceded by James Dickson	Member of Parliament for Lanark Burghs; 1772 – 1784	Succeeded by John Moore
Baronetage of Nova Scotia
Preceded by Alexander Cockburn	Baronet (of Langton); 1745–1804	Succeeded by James Cockburn
