= Cerothallia subluteoalba =

Scientific classification
- Kingdom: Fungi
- Division: Ascomycota
- Class: Lecanoromycetes
- Order: Teloschistales
- Family: Teloschistaceae
- Genus: Cerothallia
- Species: C. subluteoalba

Binomial name
- Cerothallia subluteoalba (S.Y.Kondr. & Kärnefelt) Arup, Frödén & Søchting (2013)
- Holotype site: Port Fairy, Victoria

Synonyms
- Caloplaca subluteoalba S.Y.Kondr. & Kärnefelt (2009)

Species of lichen

Cerothallia subluteoalba is a species of corticolous (bark-dwelling), crustose lichen in the family Teloschistaceae. Found in Australia, it was described as a new species in 2009. This species is distinguished by its numerous bright yellow to soft yellow-orange apothecia (fruiting bodies), tiny spores with slim dividers (septa), and a barely distinguishable thallus that either fades away or grows inside its host.

== Taxonomy ==
The lichen was formally described as a new species in 2009 by the lichenologists Sergey Kondratyuk and Ingvar Kärnefelt. The type specimen was collected by the second author from the western part of the shore of Port Fairy (Victoria), where it was found growing on shrubs above the shore. The species epithet alludes to its similarity to Caloplaca luteoalba. The taxon was transferred to the genus Cerothallia in 2013 as part of a major molecular phylogenetics-informed restructuring of the family Teloschistaceae.

== Description ==
Cerothallia subluteoalba has a diffuse, barely noticeable growth pattern, which can either blend into the surface it grows on or be completely absent. When visible, it appears as tiny whitish, greenish-grey, or dark greyish spots. It does not form distinct raised areas or nodules on the surface.

The fruiting bodies, or apothecia, of this lichen are typically numerous, ranging in size from 0.2 to 0.7 mm in diameter, and can be up to 0.25 mm thick. They tend to be either round or irregularly shaped and are initially embedded in the thallus before becoming slightly elevated. The apothecia lack a distinct outer thalline margin. The true exciple of the apothecia is a dull to bright yellow or orange colour, very narrow (about 0.03 to 0.05 mm wide) and slightly rises above the hymenium (the spore-producing layer). The disc of the apothecia is a dull brownish-yellow or greyish-orange colour. The hymenium itself is 40–50 μm high, and the layer beneath it (subhymenium) is clear and measures 20–25 μm thick. The supporting structures within the hymenium (paraphyses) are heavily branched and tend to swell at the tips, often containing brownish, lamp-shaped oil cells.

The asci (spore-bearing cells), typically contain four to eight spores. These spores are polarilocular, clear, and ellipsoid in shape, with slightly expanded areas at the septa (divisions within the spore) and pointed ends. The spores are quite variable in size, one of the cells may have a somewhat wrinkled surface, and they measure about 7 to 11 μm in length and 3 to 5.5 μm in width. The septa of the spores are about 1.5 to 3 μm thick.

In chemical tests, the top layer of the hymenium (epithecium) and the outermost layers of the true exciple react by turning brownish purple to crimson-purple, and sometimes partly blackish-purple, becoming paler over time. Cerothallia subluteoalba contains the substance parietin as a major lichen product.

== Habitat and distribution ==
Cerothallia subluteoalba is found predominantly on the bark of shrubs in coastal regions. This species is relatively rare and has been identified in only a few locations. Its presence has been recorded in Western and South Australia, Victoria, and Tasmania.
