= Ramicolous lichen =

A ramicolous lichen is one that lives on branches.
