= Cockburn baronets =

Baronetcy in the Baronetage of Nova Scotia

There have been two Cockburn baronetcies in the Baronetage of Nova Scotia.

The dates given are the dates from accession to the title, to death. Where three dates are shown, the first is a date of birth.

== Cockburn baronets of Langton, Berwick ==
- Sir William Cockburn of Langton, 1st Baronet (22 November 1627 (NS) – 1628)
- Sir William Cockburn of Langton, 2nd Baronet (1628–1650)
- Sir William Cockburn of Langton, 3rd Baronet (1650–1657)
- Sir Archibald Cockburn of Langton, 4th Baronet (1657–1705)
- Sir Archibald Cockburn of Langton, 5th Baronet (15 Nov 1687-1705–1710)
- Sir Alexander Cockburn of Langton, 6th Baronet (1710–1739)
- Sir Alexander Cockburn of Langton, 7th Baronet (1739–1745 at Fontenoy) Ensign in the First Regiment of Foot Guards
- Sir James Cockburn of Langton, 8th Baronet (c.1729-1745–1804) Member of Parliament for Linlithgow Burghs
- Sir James Cockburn of Langton, 9th Baronet (21 Mar 1771-1804–1852) Governor of Bermuda
- Sir George Cockburn of Langton, 10th Baronet (1772-1852–1853) Admiral of the Fleet and First Sea Lord
- Sir William Cockburn of Langton, 11th Baronet (1853–1858) Dean of York
- Sir Alexander James Edmund Cockburn of Langton, 12th Baronet (1858–1880) Lord Chief Justice of England and Wales

On his death the Cockburn of Langton baronetcy became dormant until now. The heir apparent has recently been found out to be Euan Alexander Cockburn Bell, born 1993.

== Cockburn baronets of Cockburn ==
- Sir James Cockburn of that Ilk, 1st Baronet (1671–1703)
- Sir William Cockburn of that Ilk, 2nd Baronet (1704–1751)
- Sir James Cockburn of that Ilk, 3rd Baronet (1751–1780)
- Sir William James Cockburn of that Ilk, 4th Baronet (1780–1800)
- Sir James Cockburn of that Ilk, 5th Baronet (1800–1809)
- Sir William Cockburn of that Ilk, 6th Baronet (1809–1835)
- Sir William Sarsfield Rossiter Cockburn of that Ilk, 7th Baronet (1835–1858)
- Sir Edward Cludde Cockburn of that Ilk, 8th Baronet (1858–1903)
- Sir Robert Cockburn of that Ilk, 9th Baronet (1903–1938)
- Sir James Stanhope Cockburn of that Ilk, 10th Baronet (1867–1947)
- Sir John Brydges Cockburn of that Ilk, 11th Baronet (1870–1949)
- Sir John Elliot Cockburn of that Ilk, 12th Baronet (1925–2015)
- Sir Charles Christopher Cockburn of that Ilk, 13th Baronet (born 1950)

The heir apparent is the current holder's elder son, Christopher Samuel Alexander Cockburn (born 1986).

== Ancestors of the Cockburn baronets ==
- Sir Alexander de Cokburne, Baron of Langton, Carriden, Bolton and Skirling (c. 1310 – c. 1370)
- unknown Cockburn
- Sir Alexander de Cockburn, Baron of Carriden (born 1358). Keeper of the Great Seal of Scotland, 1389–96.
- unknown Cockburn
- Alexander de Cockburn, Keeper of the Great Seal of Scotland. Became the Heritable Usher of the White Rod of the Parliament of Scotland on 10 February 1473.
- unknown Cockburn
- unknown Cockburn
- Sir William Cockburn, Baron of Langton (died 1513 at Flodden)
- William Cockburn of that Ilk (late 15th century – 1564)
- Alexander Cockburn of that Ilk (died 1583)
- William Cockburn of that Ilk (died 1600)
- William Cockburn of that Ilk (died 1659)
- John Cockburn of that Ilk (1598 – after 1628), father of Sir James Cockburn of that Ilk, 1st Baronet

== Bibliography ==
- Leigh Rayment's list of baronets – Baronetcies beginning with "C" (part 3)
