= Flavoplaca mereschkowskiana =

Scientific classification
- Kingdom: Fungi
- Division: Ascomycota
- Class: Lecanoromycetes
- Order: Teloschistales
- Family: Teloschistaceae
- Genus: Flavoplaca
- Species: F. mereschkowskiana

Binomial name
- Flavoplaca mereschkowskiana (S.Y.Kondr. & Kärnefelt) Arup, Frödén & Søchting (2013)

Synonyms
- Caloplaca mereschkowskiana S.Y.Kondr. & Kärnefelt (2011)

Species of lichen

Flavoplaca mereschkowskiana is a species of crustose lichen in the family Teloschistaceae. This small orange-brown lichen grows on limestone and other calcium-rich rocks across southern Australia, including Western Australia, South Australia, Victoria, and Tasmania. It was originally described in 2011 and named after the Russian biologist Konstantin Mereschkowski. The species was later moved to the genus Flavoplaca in 2013 following genetic studies that reorganized the classification of orange crustose lichens.

== Taxonomy ==
Flavoplaca mereschkowskiana was first described in 2011 as Caloplaca mereschkowskiana by Sergey Kondratyuk and Ingvar Kärnefelt, based on material collected from calcareous rock north of Northampton in Western Australia. The authors placed it in the Caloplaca lactea species complex, whose members share a pale thallus and yellow to orange fruiting bodies with small spores. The specific epithet honours the Russian biologist Konstantin Mereschkowski, one of the earliest proponents of symbiosis in evolution (symbiogenesis).

A broader molecular and morphological revision of the family Teloschistaceae in 2013 showed that several lineages formerly lumped in Caloplaca form a coherent clade now recognised as the genus Flavoplaca. Subsequently, Ulf Arup, Patrik Frödén, and Ulrik Søchting transferred C. mereschkowskiana to this genus.

== Description ==
The lichen forms patchy crusts 0.5–2 cm across, often merging into larger colonies so densely studded with fruiting bodies that the surface appears dull orange-brown at a glance. Toward the growing edge the thallus is almost level with the rock and hard to discern; nearer the centre it becomes a low mosaic of whitish-yellow areoles up to 0.8 mm wide and about 0.4 mm thick.

Apothecia (fruiting bodies) are abundant, initially sunken but soon sitting on the surface, one or two per areole. They are small (0.2–0.5 mm in diameter), round and usually well spaced, with a flat to slightly domed disc coloured orange to brown-orange that may carry a dusting of whitish crystals. In vertical section the margin is biatorine—built only from fungal tissue—and may eventually recede, leaving the disc appearing rimless. The colourless hymenium is 50–60 μm high and capped by an orange epihymenium. Paraphyses are capped by oil droplets, and the asci frequently contain fewer than the usual eight ascospores, often just two or four. These spores are broadly ellipsoid, 10–13 μm long, with a noticeably thickened central wall (septum). Chemical spot tests show a K+ (purple) reaction due to parietin, with minor amounts of parietinic acid, fallacinal and teloschistin also present.

== Habitat and distribution ==
Flavoplaca mereschkowskiana is confined to calcareous substrates—limestone outcrops, weathered shells or other calcium-rich rocks—in southern Australia. Verified collections span Western Australia, South Australia, Victoria and Tasmania, including the Nullarbor Plain and Bass Strait islands, and Kangaroo Island. It favours well-lit but not overly exposed surfaces, forming part of the orange lichen mosaic typical of semi-arid limestone landscapes. It is locally common where suitable calcareous rock is available, often growing intermixed with Cerothallia yorkensis and other teloschistoid crusts.
