= Caloplaca johnwhinrayi =

Scientific classification
- Domain: Eukaryota
- Kingdom: Fungi
- Division: Ascomycota
- Class: Lecanoromycetes
- Order: Teloschistales
- Family: Teloschistaceae
- Genus: Caloplaca
- Species: C. johnwhinrayi

Binomial name
- Caloplaca johnwhinrayi S.Y.Kondr. & Kärnefelt (2009)

Species of lichen

Caloplaca johnwhinrayi is a species of saxicolous (rock-dwelling), crustose lichen in the family Teloschistaceae. Found in Australia, it was formally described as a new species in 2009 by lichenologists Sergey Kondratyuk and Ingvar Kärnefelt.

== Taxonomy ==
The type specimen was collected from West Sister Island in the Furneaux Group, where it was found growing on small rocks and outcrops, often alongside Caloplaca kantvilasii and C. jerammungupensis. The species epithet honours Australian botanist John Whinray, who collected the type in 1966.

== Distribution ==
The lichen has been documented from Western Australia, South Australia, Victoria, and Tasmania, and in 2023 was identified at Te Whanga Lagoon on the Chatham Islands, New Zealand.

== See also ==
- List of Caloplaca species
