= Cockburn Island (Antarctica) =

Island of Antarctica

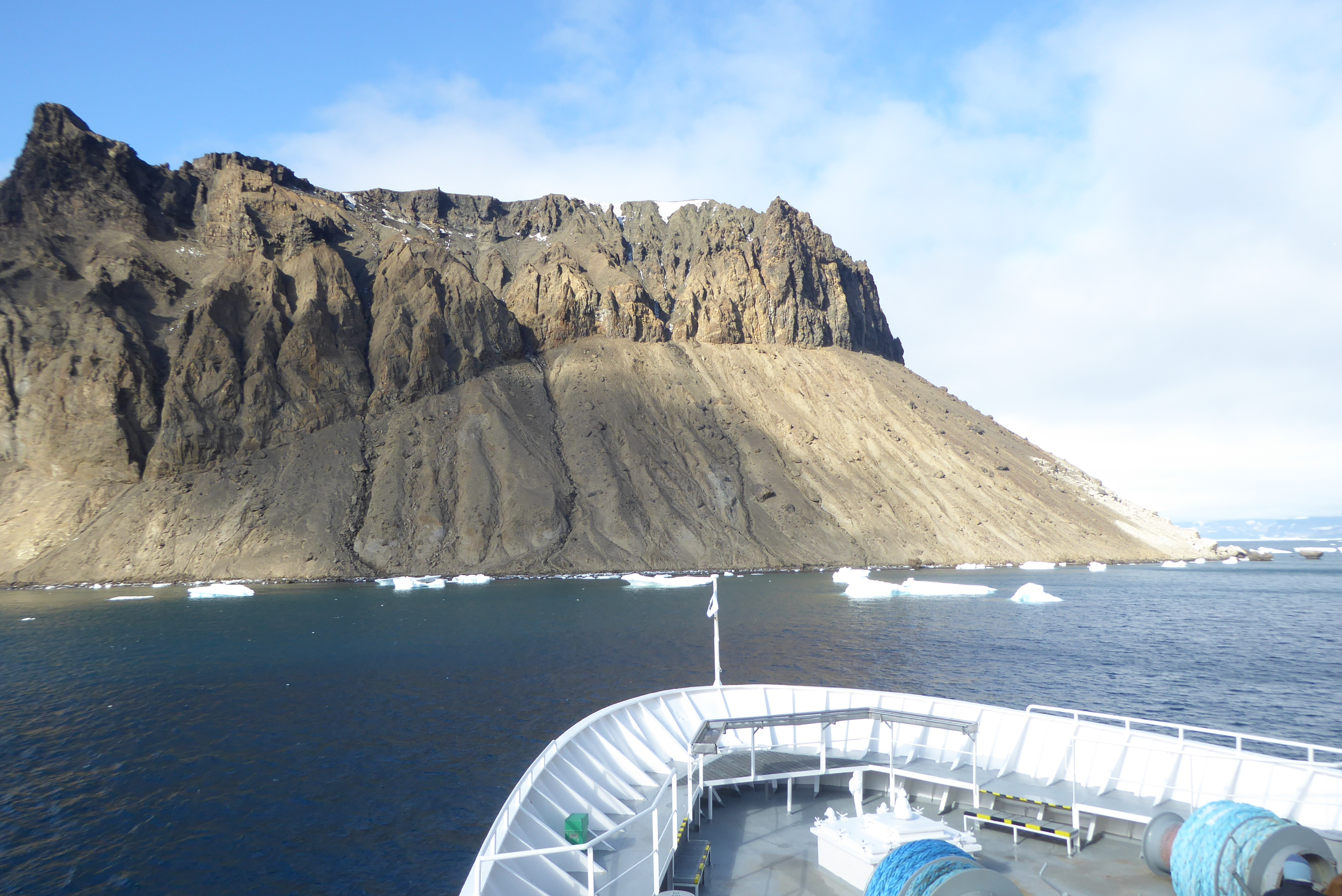

- Location of Cockburn Island

- Location in Antarctica

Geography
- Location: Antarctica
- Coordinates: 64°12′S 56°51′W
- Length: 2.7 km (1.68 mi)
- Width: 2.0 km (1.24 mi)
- Highest elevation: 450 m (1480 ft)

Administration
- Administered under the Antarctic Treaty System

Demographics
- Population: Uninhabited

Cockburn Island is an oval island 2.7 kilometres (1.7 mi) long, consisting of a high plateau with steep slopes surmounted on the northwest side by a pyramidal peak 450 m (1,476 ft) high, lying in the north-east entrance to Admiralty Sound, south of the north-east end of the Antarctic Peninsula. It was discovered by a British expedition (1839–43) led by Captain James Clark Ross, who named it for Admiral Sir George Cockburn, then serving as First Naval Lord (commander-in-chief of the Royal Navy).

== Geology ==
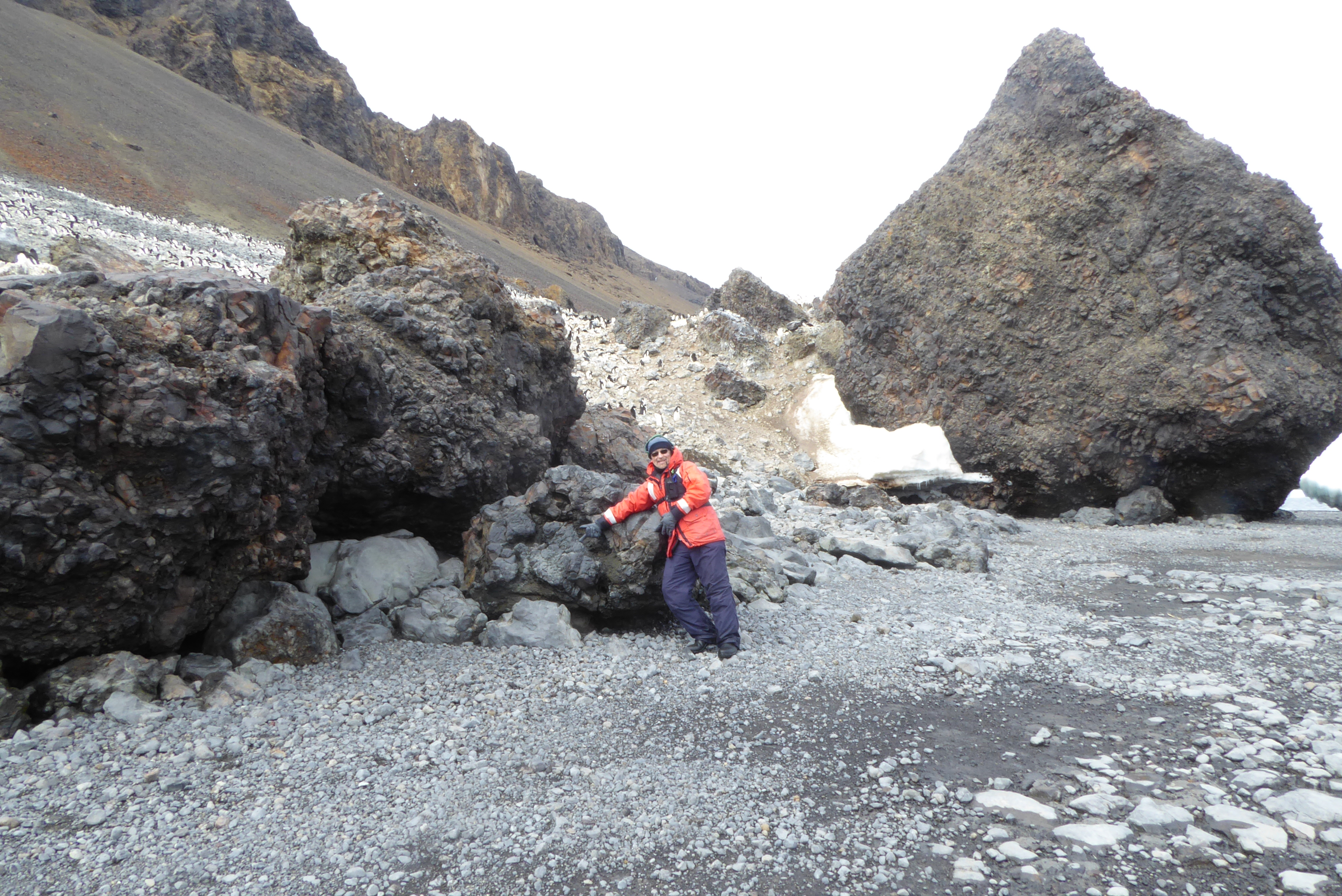

Geologically, the area makes up the Cockburn Island Formation, which was studied extensively in the late 1990s by H. A. Jonkers. Rocks found on the island are volcanic, and the island is characterized by its "precipitous cliffs". A "Pecten conglomerate" from the late Pliocene or early Pleistocene period has been identified on the island, situated on a wave-cut platform at 720–820 ft. The island is a rare volcano type called a tuya, or moberg, which was formed by a three-stage eruption sequence below an ice cap. The first stage was a subglacial hyaloclastic eruption under a thick ice cap, which shattered the lava into glass, ash and sand, which has since weathered to yellow palagonite layers. The second phase was a lava eruption into a meltwater glacial lake contained in the ice cap, which resulted in volcanic breccia and basalt pillow lava (boulders of this can be seen along the shore). The final phase was subaerial basalt lava flows on top of the previous volcanic deposits after the lake drained or boiled away.

== Wildlife ==
The island has been identified as an Important Bird Area (IBA) by BirdLife International because it supports a breeding colony of about 800 pairs of Antarctic shags, as well as about 16,000 breeding pairs of Adélie penguins (estimated from 2011 satellite imagery. Snow petrel nests were reported from the island in 1901; it is not known whether they continue to breed there. Joseph Dalton Hooker, at the time a junior naturalist stationed aboard HMS Erebus, made a series of botanical collections on the island in 1843.

== See also ==
- Composite Antarctic Gazetteer
- List of Antarctic and sub-Antarctic islands
- List of Antarctic islands south of 60° S
- SCAR
- Territorial claims in Antarctica
