= George Edward Ayscough =

English dramatist and traveller

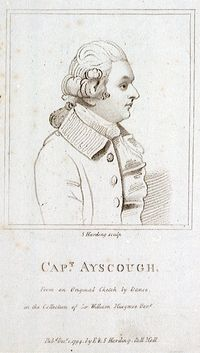
George Edward Ayscough

George Edward Ayscough (died 14 October 1779) was an English dramatist and traveller.

== Life ==
Ayscough was the son of Dr. Francis Ayscough, dean of Bristol, by a sister of the first Lord Lyttelton. For some time he held a commission in the Guards.

In 1776, he produced at Drury Lane Theatre a play, a version of the Semiramis of Voltaire, Richard Yates representing the chief character; an epilogue was provided by Richard Brinsley Sheridan. The tragedy had eleven representations, and the English author enjoyed three benefits on account of it. On the first performance Captain Ayscough's brother officers attended in great force and secured the success of Semiramis. In the Biographia Dramatica, Ayscough is described as "a fool of fashion," "a parasite of Lord Lyttelton;" and his tragedy is condemned as contemptible.

He left England on account of his failing health, and afterwards published some account of his travels in Italy. He was the editor of the Miscellaneous Works of his uncle, Lord Lyttelton, published in 1774.
