= Sir George Cockburn, 10th Baronet =

Royal Navy Admiral of the Fleet and politician (1772–1853)

Admiral of the Fleet The Right Honourable Sir George Cockburn GCB Bt FRS
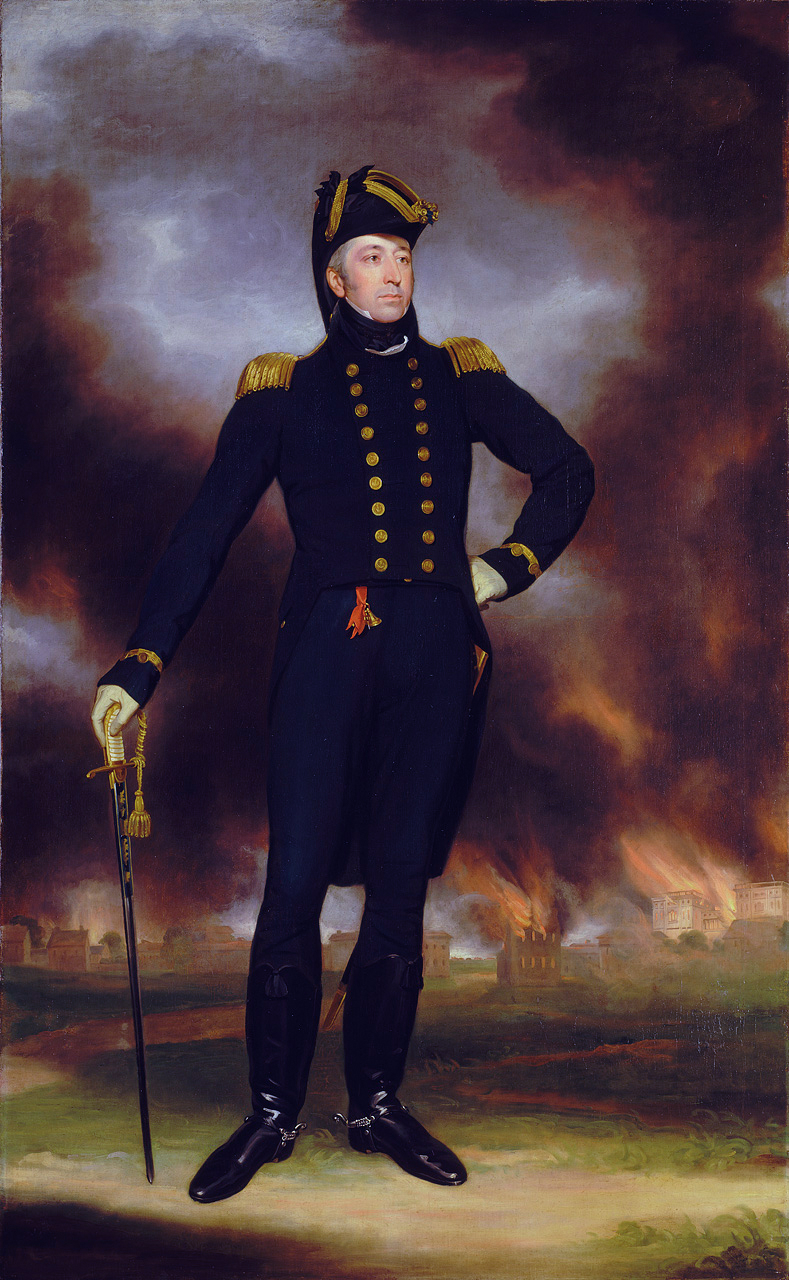
- Portrait of George Cockburn by John James Halls, 1817
- Born: 22 April 1772; London, England
- Died: 19 August 1853 (aged 81); Leamington Spa, England
- Burial place: Kensal Green Cemetery, London
- Military career
- Allegiance: Great Britain; United Kingdom
- Branch: Royal Navy
- Service years: 1786–1846
- Rank: Admiral of the Fleet
- Commands: HMS Speedy; HMS Inconstant; HMS Minerve; HMS Meleager; HMS Phaeton; HMS Captain; HMS Pompée; HMS Implacable; Cape of Good Hope Station; North American Station
- Conflicts: French Revolutionary Wars; Napoleonic Wars; War of 1812
- Awards: Knight Grand Cross of the Order of the Bath

Admiral of the Fleet Sir George Cockburn, 10th Baronet, GCB, PC, FRS (22 April 1772 – 19 August 1853) was a Royal Navy officer and politician. As a captain, he was present at the Battle of Cape St Vincent in February 1797 during the French Revolutionary Wars. He commanded the naval support at the invasion of Martinique in February 1809 during the Napoleonic Wars.

He also directed the capture and Burning of Washington on 24 August 1814 as an advisor to Major General Robert Ross during the War of 1812. He went on to be First Naval Lord and in that capacity sought to improve the standards of gunnery in the fleet, forming a gunnery school at Portsmouth; later he ensured that the Navy had the latest steam and screw technology and put emphasis on the ability to manage seamen without the need to resort to physical punishment.

== Naval career ==
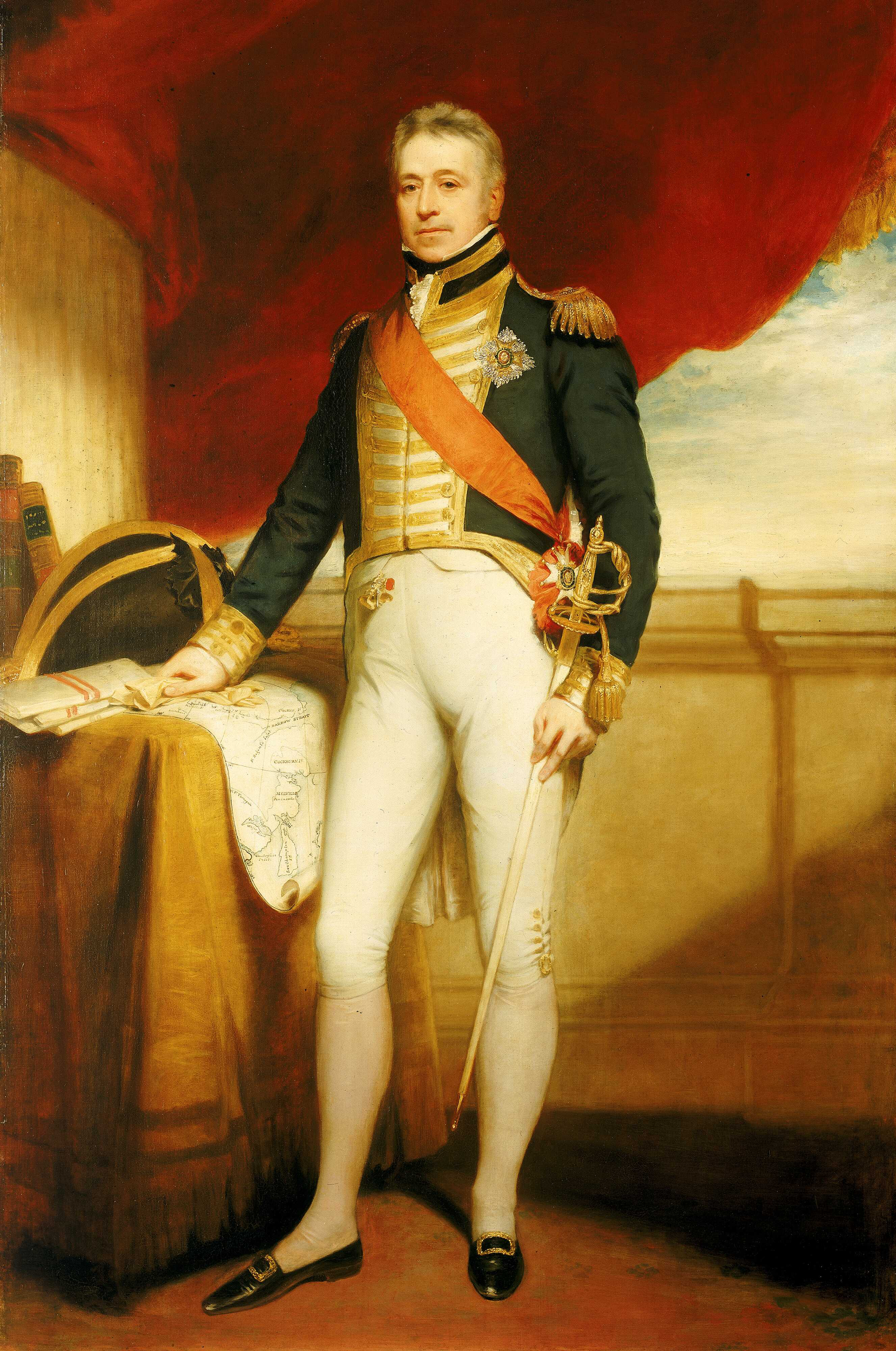
Portrait of George Cockburn an 1820 portrait of Cockburn by William Beechey

Cockburn was born the second son of Sir James Cockburn, 8th Baronet and his second wife, Augusta Anne Ayscough. He was educated at the Royal Navigational School and joined the Royal Navy in March 1781 as a Captain's servant in the sixth-rate HMS Resource. He joined the sloop HMS Termagant in 1787, transferred to the sloop HMS Ariel under the Commander-in-Chief, East Indies in 1788, and then became midshipman in the fifth-rate HMS Hebe in the Channel Squadron in 1791. He joined the fourth-rate HMS Romney in the Mediterranean Fleet later in 1791 and then became acting lieutenant in the fifth-rate HMS Pearl in 1792. He was promoted to the substantive rank of lieutenant on 2 January 1793, and became lieutenant on the brig-sloop HMS Orestes later that month before transferring to the first-rate HMS Britannia in the Mediterranean Fleet in February 1793 and then to the first-rate HMS Victory, Flagship of the Mediterranean Fleet, in June 1793. He became the sloop commander HMS Speedy in October 1793 and acting captain of the fifth-rate HMS Inconstant in January 1794.

Cockburn was promoted to the substantive rank of captain on 10 February 1794 and given command of the fifth-rate HMS Meleager in the Mediterranean Fleet later that month. He took part in the blockade of Livorno in March 1795 and was given command of the frigate HMS Minerve in August 1796, having been mentioned in despatches in May 1796. He fought a gallant action with the Spanish frigate Santa Sabina in January 1797 and was present at the battle of Cape St Vincent in February 1797 during the French Revolutionary Wars.

In company with those of the frigate HMS Lively, Minerve's boats' crews successfully cut out the French ship Mutine at Santa Cruz, Tenerife in May 1797.

Cockburn commanded the fifth-rate HMS Phaeton on the East Indies Station in July 1803, the third-rate HMS Captain in July 1806, and the third-rate HMS Pompée in March 1808. He commanded the naval support at the reduction of Martinique in February 1809 during the Napoleonic Wars, for which he received the thanks of Parliament.

Cockburn commanded a squadron of warships for the landings in Walcheren in July 1809 during the Walcheren Campaign. He took command of the third-rate HMS Implacable off the coast of Spain in January 1810 and sailed to Quiberon Bay with a small squadron whose mission was to arrange the escape of the King of Spain, whom the French had imprisoned at the Château de Valençay. The mission failed when Ferdinand refused to have anything to do with the British. Cockburn was promoted to commodore, hoisting his broad pennant in the fourth-rate HMS Grampus in November 1811.

=== War of 1812 ===
Cockburn was promoted to rear admiral on 12 August 1812, and hoisted his flag in the third-rate HMS Marlborough as commander of a squadron of ships off Cádiz. He was reassigned in November 1812 to the North American Station, where he played a major role in the War of 1812 as second-in-command to Admiral Sir John Warren until the end of March 1814, and then to Warren's successor, Admiral Sir Alexander Cochrane, for the rest of the war.

He led forces cruising up and down the Chesapeake Bay and other parts of the Atlantic coast in 1813 and 1814, seizing American merchant shipping, disrupting U.S. commerce, and raiding local ports. Warren "had been waging a pretty tepid campaign on the Atlantic seaboard, and the Admiralty decided he could use an aggressive subordinate." Cockburn's prior military experience made him a suitable candidate for the role in the eyes of the Admiralty. Historian Steve Vogel compared Cockburn's raids on U.S. interests along the Eastern Seaboard to Sherman's March to the Sea during the American Civil War.

The most important of Cockburn's involvements during the War was his role in the capture and burning of Washington on 24 August 1814, undertaken as an advisor to Major General Robert Ross. The plan to attack Washington had been formulated by Cockburn, who accurately predicted that "within a short period, with enough force, we could easily have at our mercy the capital." A CBC News article described General Ross as less optimistic than Cockburn, having "never dreamt for one minute that an army of 3,500 men with 1,000 marines reinforcement, with no cavalry, hardly any artillery, could march 50 miles inland and capture an enemy capital."

Cockburn had reached Benedict, Maryland, via the Patuxent River with his warships; the troops then disembarked and marched to Washington to mount the attack. The 4,500 troops, commanded by Ross, successfully captured the capital on 24 August 1814. Cockburn accompanied Ross and recommended burning the entire city. Ross decided instead to put only public buildings to the torch, including the White House and the United States Capitol, while sparing nearly all privately owned properties.

Following the battle, Cockburn oversaw the destruction of the National Intelligencer newspaper's offices and printing house by his soldiers; he famously stated: "Be sure that all the C's are destroyed, so that the rascals cannot any longer abuse my name."

He was appointed a Knight Commander of the Order of the Bath on 4 January 1815.

=== Subsequent years ===
In August 1815, Cockburn was given the job of conveying Napoleon in the third-rate HMS Northumberland to Saint Helena. Cockburn remained there for months as governor of the island and Commander-in-Chief of the Cape of Good Hope Station. He was advanced to Knight Grand Cross of the Order of the Bath on 20 February 1818, and promoted to vice-admiral on 12 August 1819. He was elected a Fellow of the Royal Society on 21 December 1820.

== Political career ==
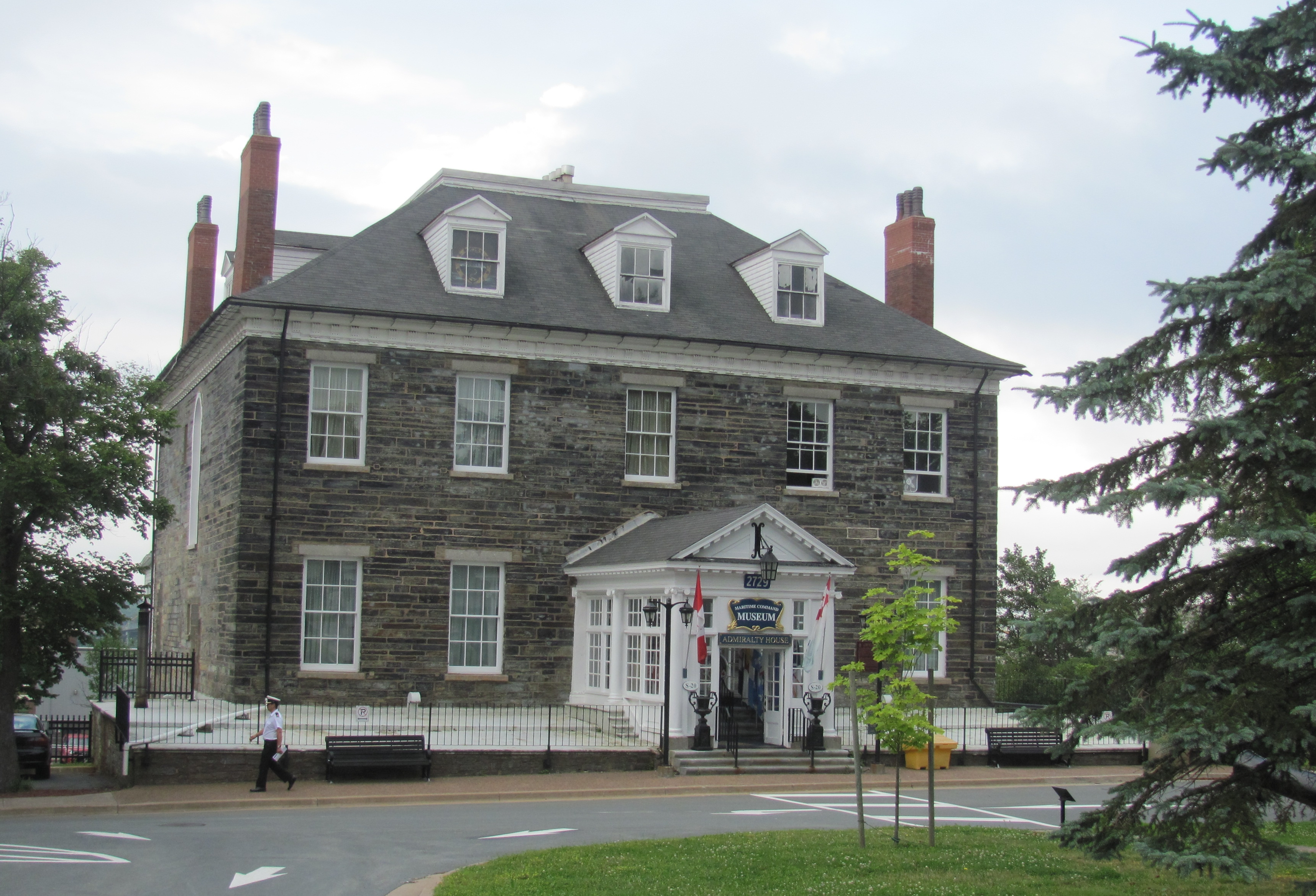
The Admiralty House in Halifax, Nova Scotia, was Cockburn's residence while Commander-in-Chief, North American Station

Entering politics, Cockburn was elected Tory Member of Parliament for Portsmouth at the 1818 general election and was appointed a Junior Naval Lord in the Liverpool ministry in April 1818. He became Tory Member of Parliament for Weobly at the 1820 general election and, having become Major-General of the Royal Marine Forces on 5 April 1821 and a member of the Privy Council on 30 April 1827, he was elected Tory Member of Parliament for Plymouth at a by-election in June 1828. While serving as a Junior Naval Lord, he forced the resignation of the Duke of Clarence as Lord High Admiral in September 1828 for acting without the authority of the Board of the Admiralty. Cockburn was elevated to First Naval Lord in the Wellington ministry in September 1828 and in that capacity sought to improve the standards of gunnery in the fleet, forming a gunnery school at Portsmouth. He resigned when the Government fell from power in November 1830, but remained active in Parliamentary affairs, including leading the opposition to the abolition of the Navy Board in 1832. After losing his seat in Parliament at the 1832 general election, he returned to sea and became Commander-in-Chief of the North America and West Indies Station, hoisting his flag in the fourth-rate HMS Vernon, in December 1832.

Cockburn became First Naval Lord briefly again in the First Peel ministry in December 1834 but resigned when the Government fell from power in April 1835. He returned to his old post as Commander-in-Chief of the North America and West Indies Station. Promoted to full admiral on 10 January 1837, he was elected Conservative Member of Parliament for Ripon at a by-election in September 1841 and became First Naval Lord again in the Second Peel ministry later that month. As First Sea Lord he ensured that the Navy had latest steam and screw technology and put emphasis of the ability to manage seamen without the need to resort to physical punishment. He resigned when the Government fell from power in July 1846, became Rear-Admiral of the United Kingdom on 10 August 1847 and was promoted to Admiral of the Fleet on 1 July 1851. He inherited the family baronetcy from his elder brother in February 1852 and died at Leamington Spa on 19 August 1853. He is buried in Kensal Green Cemetery.

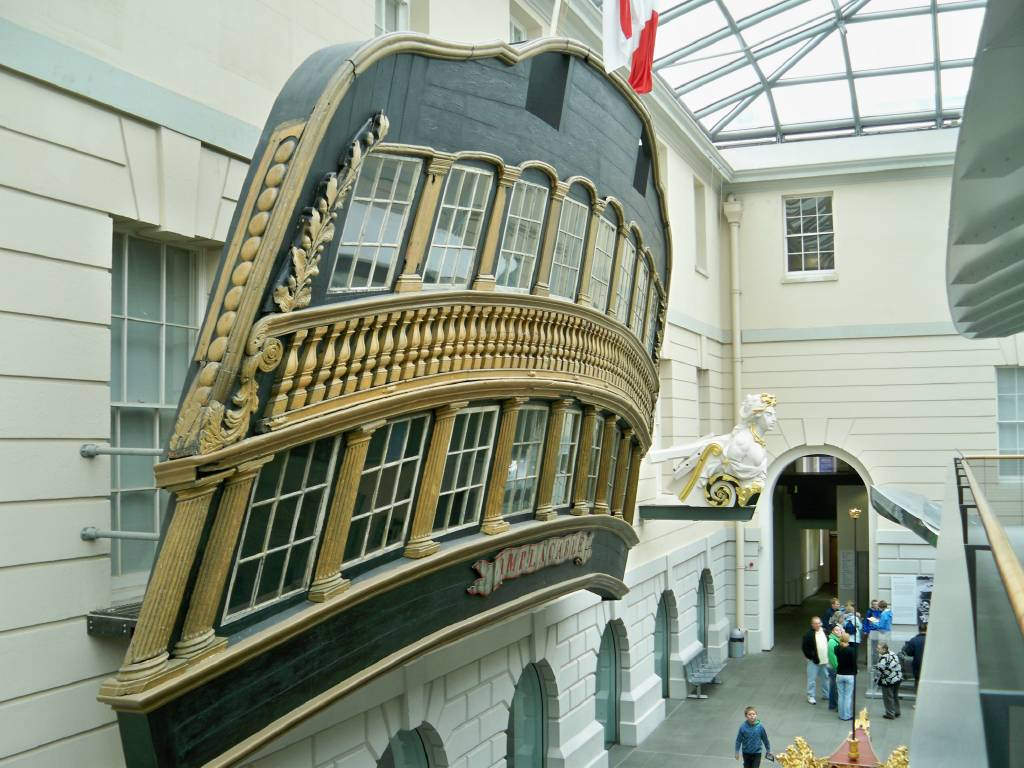
The Stern of the third-rate HMS Implacable, which Cockburn commanded during the Walcheren Campaign

Cockburn Sound in Western Australia was named after him by Captain James Stirling in 1827. Subsequently, the City of Cockburn also adopted the name. At the tip of the Antarctic Peninsula, Cockburn Island was named for him by Sir James Clark Ross during his Antarctic expedition between 1839 and 1843. Cape Cockburn and Cockburn Bay on Nelson Island on the west coast of Canada were named after him.

== Family ==
In 1809, Cockburn married his cousin Mary Cockburn. The couple had one surviving daughter, Augusta Harriot Mary Cockburn (d. 1869), who married Captain John Cochrane Hoseason.

== Sources ==
- Gresham, John D. Military Heritage, February 2002, Volume 3, No. 4.
- Heathcote, Tony (2002). The British Admirals of the Fleet 1734 - 1995. Pen & Sword Ltd. ISBN 0-85052-835-6.
- Chisholm, Hugh, ed. (1911). "Cockburn, Sir George" . Encyclopædia Britannica. Vol. 6 (11th ed.). Cambridge University Press. p. 624.
- Laughton, John Knox (1887). "Cockburn, George (1772-1853)" . In Stephen, Leslie (ed.). Dictionary of National Biography. Vol. 11. London: Smith, Elder & Co.

Parliament of the United Kingdom
Preceded by John Markham; John Bonham-Carter	Member of Parliament for Portsmouth; 1818–1820; With: John Bonham-Carter	Succeeded by John Markham; John Bonham-Carter
Preceded by Viscount Weymouth; Lord Frederick Cavendish-Bentinck	Member of Parliament for Weobley; 1820–1828; With: Lord Frederick Cavendish-Bentinck to 1824; Lord Henry Thynne 1824–26; Lord William Thynne 1826–31	Succeeded by Lord Henry Thynne; Lord William Thynne
Preceded by Sir William Congreve; Sir Thomas Byam Martin	Member of Parliament for Plymouth; 1828–1832; With: Sir Thomas Byam Martin	Succeeded by John Collier; Thomas Beaumont Bewes
Preceded by Sir Edward Sugden; Thomas Pemberton	Member of Parliament for Ripon; 1841–1847; With: Thomas Pemberton 1835–43; Thomas Cusack-Smith 1843–46; Edwin Lascelles 1846–57	Succeeded by Sir James Graham, 2nd Baronet; Edwin Lascelles
Military offices
Preceded by Charles Tyler	Commander-in-Chief, Cape of Good Hope Station; 1815–1816	Succeeded by Robert Plampin
Preceded by The Duke of Clarence and St Andrews (Lord High Admiral)	First Naval Lord; 1828–1830	Succeeded by Sir Thomas Hardy
Preceded by Sir Edward Colpoys	Commander-in-Chief, North America and West Indies Station; 1832 – December 1834	Vacant Title next held by himself
Preceded by Sir Charles Adam	First Naval Lord; December 1834 – April 1835	Succeeded by Sir Charles Adam
Vacant Title last held by himself	Commander-in-Chief, North America and West Indies Station; April 1835 – 1836	Succeeded by Sir Peter Halkett
Preceded by Sir Charles Adam	First Naval Lord; 1841–1846	Succeeded by Sir William Parker
Honorary titles
Preceded by Sir Thomas Byam Martin	Rear-Admiral of the United Kingdom; 1847–1853	Succeeded by Sir William Hall Gage
Baronetage of Nova Scotia
Preceded by James Cockburn	Baronet (of Langton); 1852–1853	Succeeded by William Cockburn
