= Flavoplaca kantvilasii =

Scientific classification
- Kingdom: Fungi
- Division: Ascomycota
- Class: Lecanoromycetes
- Order: Teloschistales
- Family: Teloschistaceae
- Genus: Flavoplaca
- Species: F. kantvilasii

Binomial name
- Flavoplaca kantvilasii (S.Y.Kondr. & Kärnefelt) Arup, Frödén & Søchting (2013)
- Holotype: Cape Burney, Western Australia

Synonyms
- Caloplaca kantvilasii S.Y.Kondr. & Kärnefelt (2007)

Species of lichen

Flavoplaca kantvilasii is a species of saxicolous (rock-dwelling), crustose lichen in the family Teloschistaceae. Found in Australia, it was formally described as a new species in 2007.

== Taxonomy ==
The lichen was formally described by the lichenologists Sergey Kondratyuk and Ingvar Kärnefelt in 2007; they initially classified it in the genus Caloplaca. The type specimen was collected from Western Australia, specifically at Cape Burney near the mouth of the Greenough River. This specimen, collected in January, 2004, was found growing on sandy limestone surfaces. The species epithet honours Tasmanian lichenologist Gintaras Kantvilas. Ulf Arup and colleagues transferred the taxon to the genus Flavoplaca in 2013 as part of a large-scale reorganisation of the family Teloschistaceae.

== Description ==
Flavoplaca kantvilasii features a rosette-like thallus, typically 1–4 mm wide, with radiating areoles that initially measure 0.8–1.2 mm in length. These areoles expand to form indistinct, dull, white-brownish orange spots. The areoles are quite thick, ranging from 0.5 to 1.8 mm in width and up to 1.3 mm in thickness. They are convex and separated by narrow cracks, occasionally forming rosettes up to 2 mm wide. The terminal and peripheral parts of the areoles tend to be undulating or dissected and expand towards the tips. Some areoles have a thin, whitish pruina at the centre and are covered in a richly blastidious margin that eventually becomes enveloped in a soredious mass.

The upper surface of the areoles varies in colour, ranging from bright yellow to brownish yellow, and sometimes with shades of whitish yellow, brownish, or dull rose with white pruina. This contrasts with the narrow yellow-orange blastidious zone along the margins or the bright yellow to brownish-greenish-orange soredious mass. The areoles have a cortex about 15–25 μm thick and an algal layer of approximately 60–70 μm, with a medullar zone around 0.6 mm thick in the central portion.

The apothecia of Flavoplaca kantvilasii are small, measuring 0.2–0.7 mm in diameter, and are lecanorine in type. The thalline margin is thick and eroded at the sides, often with 1 to 5 apothecia per areole. The disc is brownish-reddish-orange, and the thalline margin has a cortex around 10–15 μm thick. The hymenium stands 60–70 μm high, with a subhymenium up to 70 μm thick, containing numerous oil droplets. The paraphyses contain small oil droplets and widen towards the tips. The ascospores vary in shape and size, with a septum thickness of 2–8 μm. The thallus and apothecia (K+) (red), and the cortex K+ (dark brown-reddish). Key chemical components include parietin, fallacinal, parietinic acid, and teloschistin.

== Similar species ==
Flavoplaca kantvilasii shares similarities with C. citrina, yet it can be distinguished by its notably thicker and more convex areoles or squamules. Additionally, F. kantvilasii features smaller blastidia and larger conblastidia, and its asci contain a varied number of ascospores that exhibit a broader size range. In contrast to another sorediate species, C. cranfieldii, which is also discussed in this study, F. kantvilasii is characterized by its thick and highly convex areoles or squamules, which uniquely have margins that curve upwards. This species also stands out due to its larger blastidia and conblastidia, the presence of lecanorine apothecia, and longer ascospores.

== Habitat and distribution ==
Flavoplaca kantvilasii is commonly found growing on natural calcareous rocks and granite outcrops. Its habitats range from coastal areas to subalpine regions and dry inland sites. This species is also adaptable to artificial environments, thriving on man-made materials such as building blocks and asbestos sheeting.

In terms of its distribution, Flavoplaca kantvilasii is a widely distributed species across Australia. It has been recorded in various regions, including Western Australia, New South Wales, the Australian Capital Territory, South Australia, Victoria, and Tasmania.
