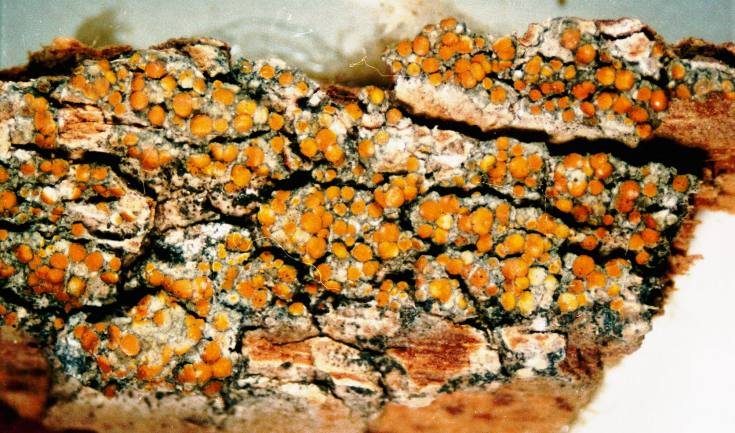
- Cerothallia luteoalba

Scientific classification
- Domain: Eukaryota
- Kingdom: Fungi
- Division: Ascomycota
- Class: Lecanoromycetes
- Order: Teloschistales
- Family: Teloschistaceae
- Genus: Cerothallia; Arup, Frödén & Søchting (2013)

Type species
- Cerothallia luteoalba (Turner) Arup, Frödén & Søchting (2013)

Species
- C. luteoalba C. subluteoalba C. yarraensis C. yorkensis

= Cerothallia =

Genus of lichens

Cerothallia is a genus of crustose lichens in the family Teloschistaceae. It has four species, all of which occur in the Southern Hemisphere. The genus was circumscribed in 2013 by Ulf Arup, Patrik Frödén, and Ulrik Søchting, with Cerothallia luteoalba assigned as the type species. The type is more widely distributed, as it is also found in Europe and North America. The generic name Cerothallia means "with waxy thallus".

== Species ==
- Cerothallia luteoalba (Turner) Arup, Frödén & Søchting (2013)
- Cerothallia subluteoalba (S.Y.Kondr. & Kärnefelt) Arup, Frödén & Søchting (2013)
- Cerothallia yarraensis (S.Y.Kondr. & Kärnefelt) S.Y.Kondr., Kärnefelt, Elix, A.Thell, Jung Kim, M.H.Jeong, N.N.Yu, A.S.Kondr. & Hur (2014)
- Cerothallia yorkensis (S.Y.Kondr. & Kärnefelt) Arup, Frödén & Søchting (2013)
