= Francis Ayscough =

British tutor (1701–1763)

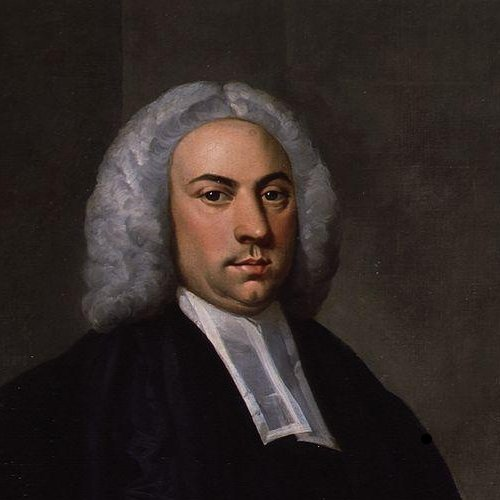
- Ayscough by Richard Wilson, c. 1749
- Born: 19 December 1701; Surrey, England
- Died: 16 August 1763 (aged 61); Bristol, England
- Occupation: Tutor

Francis Ayscough (19 December 1701 – 16 August 1763) was an English tutor who taught George III and Clerk of the Closet to George's father Frederick, Prince of Wales and later Dean of Bristol Cathedral.

== Biography ==
Francis was born in the English county of Surrey on 19 December 1701, and baptised on 25 December in St Olave's Church, Southwark. He was educated at Winchester College, where he gained a scholarship in 1715, (Note: The Winchester register incorrectly has Ayscough continuing to Balliol College, Oxford and graduating B.A. in 1723: this was Ayscough's brother, Gabriel) and at Corpus Christi College, Oxford, where he matriculated in 1717, graduating B.A. 1720, M.A. 1723, B.D. 1731, D.D. 1735. He was initially rejected for a fellowship at Oxford, but was admitted after the intercession of the Bishop of Winchester, Richard Willis, who threatened to sack all of those involved if Ayscough was not appointed in 15 minutes.

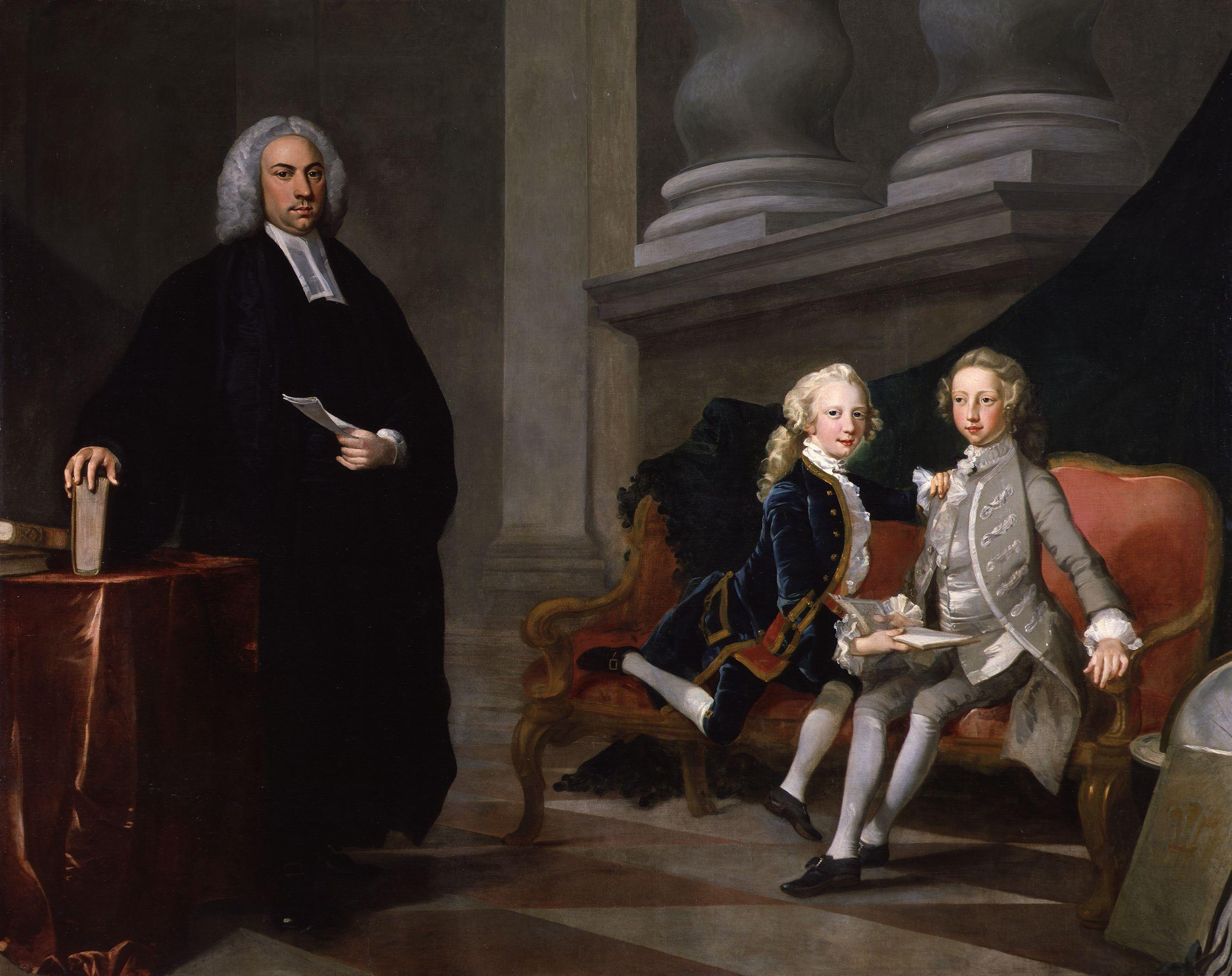
Francis Ayscough, Dean of Bristol and tutor to George III with his pupils. By Richard Wilson, c. 1749.

He was appointed as the first tutor to George who was to be the future King George III of Great Britain. Reportedly Ayscough was appointed by the intercession of Sir George Lyttlelton, who had some influence with George's father. Ayscough had married Anne Lyttleton who was George's sister.

In 1735, it was Ayscough as Chaplain to the Prince of Wales who was called on to give a sermon to the House of Commons to commemorate the "martyrdom of Charles I".

The boy's father retained Francis' services, but in 1749 he made a further appointment of an assistant to Ayscough. The new assistant, Lewis Scott, was a mathematician and a member of the Royal Society and it was through him that George III became the first British monarch to have a scientific education.

On the death of Frederick in 1751, Ayscough and North were both replaced by the Whig politicians. Ayscough was replaced by the Bishop of Norwich, Thomas Hayter.

In 1754, he officiated at the wedding of William Pitt and Hester Grenville. In 1755, he had a sermon published on the wrongs of "self murder".

In 1756, Ayscough became the Canon (of 12th prebend) for Winchester Cathedral, 1756–1763, Ayscough was also appointed to be the Dean of Bristol in 1761, a post that he also held until his death which took place in Bristol on 16 August 1763; he was buried in Bristol Cathedral three days later. Anne, his wife, outlived him and died in their house in London, on 16 August 1776, aged 64. Ayscough's children included Anne Augusta who became Lady Cockburn, and George Edward Ayscough who was a Guards officer and sometime dramatist.
