= Ainscough =

Family name

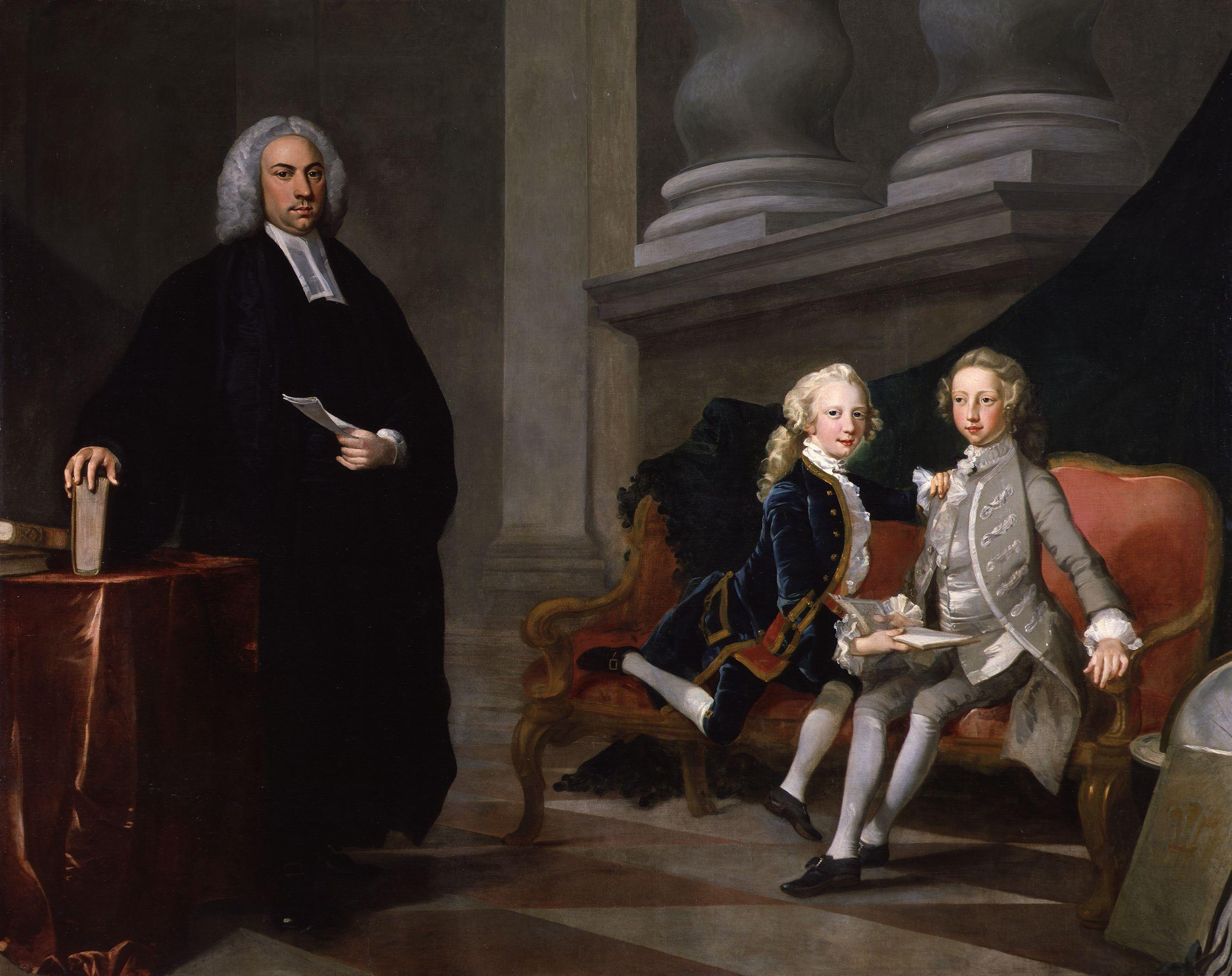
Francis Ayscough, Dean of Bristol and tutor to George III of Great Britain with his pupils. By Richard Wilson, circa 1749.

Ainscough is an Old Norse, Scandinavian surname, also spelled Ayscough, Aiskew, Askew, Ascough and Aynscough.

== Origins and variants ==
It is thought that the name is derived from the Norse words "ask skog", although other sources suggest that Aiskew is a corruption of the words "Eiki Skogr" translating to Oak Wood. An alternative Swedish translation for the name "enskog" is "juniper forest". The "en" part of the word meaning juniper, "skog" meaning wood or forest. Today the name is pronounced /ˈeɪnzkoʊ/.

Other suggestions indicate that the name Ainscough is of French origin. When William the Conqueror invaded England, he brought his army of knights. These knights from Normandy were given land for their effort during the invasion and were placed as his head of government in each Shire. Wikipedia has information about a plaque placed in Normandy Cathedral before leaving for England. This plaque has a list of knights. There are two knights listed as "Ansgot" which would have been the French spelling for Ainscough. However, further evidence is required to support this translation of the name.

Name variations are: Ainscough, Ayscough, Ayscue, Ascough, Askew, Anscow, Askow, Ascow, Ascoe, Arscow, Anescoe, Aniscoe, Anscow, Ascoughe, Aynstowe, Askoes, Asckoe, Askoe, Askowes, Aynscow, Ainscow, Ainscowe, Ainscoe, Asque, Eskew, Escue and Insker.

== Notable Ainscoughs ==
Mediaeval alabaster of Sir Edward Ayscough (1612) & wife, Stallingborough. Image: Barbara Ainscough 2007.

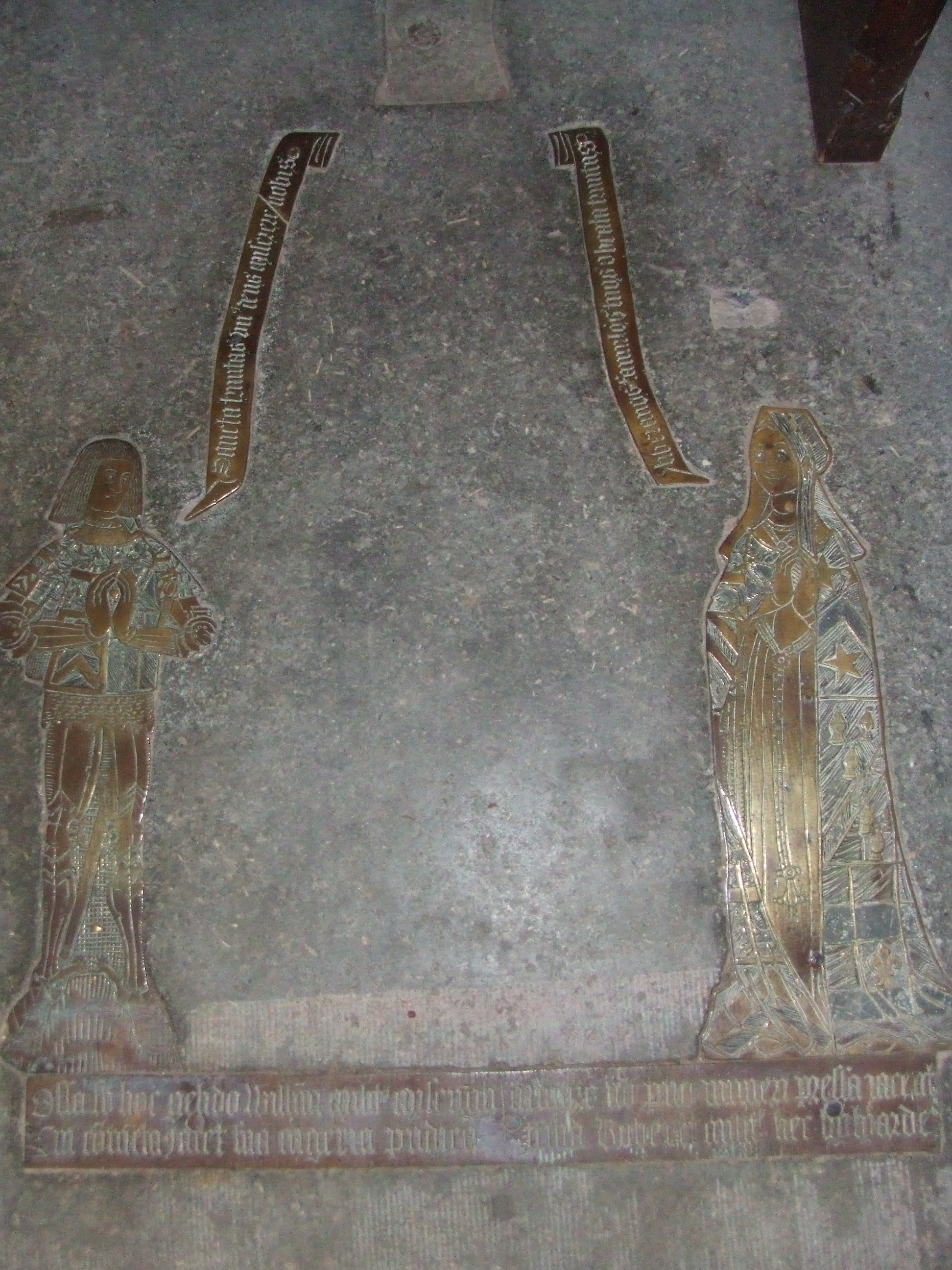
Mediaeval brass of Sir William Ayscough of Stallingborough. Image: Barbara Ainscough 2007.

- William Ayscough (or Aiscough; died 1450), Bishop of Salisbury and Confessor to King Henry VI – of the Bedale/Lincolnshire Ayscough line. He was nominated on 11 February 1438 and consecrated on 20 July 1438. Murdered at Edington, Wiltshire, on 29 June 1450 by an angry mob during Jack Cade's Rebellion.
- Anne Askew (Ayscough) Kyme (1521–1546), English Anabaptist, daughter of Sir William of Stallingborough, Lincolnshire. In 1546, Anne was arrested three times for heresy, committed to the Tower, subjected to the rack, and burnt at Smithfield 16 July 1546.
- Sir William Ayscough of Stallingborough (1497–1541), knighted in 1513 by Henry VIII at the siege of Tournai. Alabaster busts and brasses dated circa 1612 of Sir Edward, Sir Francis and Sir William can be found in the church of Ss Peter & Paul, Stallingborough.
- Sir Francis Ayscough (c. 1509-1564), son of Sir William, was knighted "at the winning of Boulogne", Sheriff of Lincoln in 1545, 1549 and 1554. Buried at St Mary's Church, South Kelsey, Lincolnshire.
- Sir Edward Ayscough (died 1558), youngest son of Sir William, and cup-bearer to Henry VIII from 1539 to 1547. Buried at Keelby, Lincolnshire.
- Hannah Ayscough (1623–1679), mother of Sir Isaac Newton (1642–1727). Hannah was born in Market Overton in Rutland in 1623. Her father was James Ayscough. Isaac Newton the elder (1606–1642) married Hannah Ayscough in April 1642 in Woolsthorpe, a hamlet within the Parish of Colsterworth.
- Francis Ayscough (1700–1763), Dean of Bristol; tutor to George III. In 1756, Ayscough became the Canon for Winchester Cathedral (1756–1763). Ayscough's children included Augusta (Lady Cockburn) and George Edward, a Guards officer.
- Augusta Anne Ayscough (1749–1837), the daughter of Francis Ayscough. The second wife of Sir James Cockburn and became Lady Cockburn of Langton in 1769.
- James Ayscough (died 1759) scientist and optician, an English designer and maker of scientific instruments. He became known for his microscopes. His shop was in London between 1740 and 1759. In 1752, he designed the first spectacles with double-hinged side pieces.

== Lancashire Ainscoughs ==
Recent research shows that there are references to Ainscoughs in the Ormskirk area as early as the 13thC – William of Ainscough was a beneficiary to the church in Ormskirk; and there is a reference in 'The Cartulary of Burscough Priory' (1199-c. 1230) to a piece of land in the Scarisbrick estate called Aykescogh (Oak Wood) in the 12thC. In the same document the spelling of the name changes, in 1199 this is referred to as a place called 'Ayscogh', but then changes just 50 years later to 'Aykescogh' (1245-c. 1260).

Some genealogical sources give the English-Scottish borders as the origin of the family, others claim Cumberland as the source. Given the various theories on the derivation of the name, it is possible that there were other, independent lineages with the same surname.

Ralph Ainscough (b. 1899 in Horwich) recorded his grandfather Ralph (b. 1841 in Aspull) telling him that older generations of the Ainscoughs – e.g. William (b. 1816 in Blackrod) had pronounced the name as "Ainsker". There is some documentary evidence for this as William's younger brother Charles (b. 1818 in Blackrod) gave his name as "Insker" on moving to Staffordshire in the 1840s. Some Yorkshire names acquired an internal "n" when crossing the Pennines into Lancashire. "Ainsker" may well have originated as "Aisker" – which is not far removed from the Anglo-Saxon "Aiks keogh" or oak wood. Given the common nature of places as surname origins, it is possible that there was more than one distinct line with the same surname.

Evidence of origin from the International Genealogical Index (IGI) is mixed and inconclusive. The IGI itself is a valuable but flawed resource. The current online database – which I shall term "IGI 2" – contains records contributed by members of the Church of Jesus Christ of Latter-day Saints (LDS), many of which are questionable. The original pass through Britain's parish records by LDS members was free of personal contributions and was available on microfiches in such centres as the library of the Society of Genealogists. I shall term this database "IGI 1". This original database excluded many Catholic records, owing to the reluctance of Catholic priests to allow their records being transcribed by the LDS. It also failed to record some nonconformist register entries. Given these caveats, an examination of the 1,623 records of Ainscoughs in Lancashire in the original IGI 1 shows that the earliest recorded event was the christening of Thomas Ainscough – son of John – on 27 April 1549 in Chorley. The next was the marriage of Kateryn Aynscow to John Brindill (Katherine Ainscough & John Brindle) on 17 January 1550 in the parish of Chorley. In the same year, on 20 January and in the same parish, Richard Aynscow married "Jone Leeds". John, Katherine and Richard may have been siblings and quite possibly were born in the 1520s. The records in IGI 1 are drawn almost exclusively from Anglican records, but these three Ainscoughs may well have come from the Lincolnshire connection.

== Notable Lancashire Ainscoughs ==
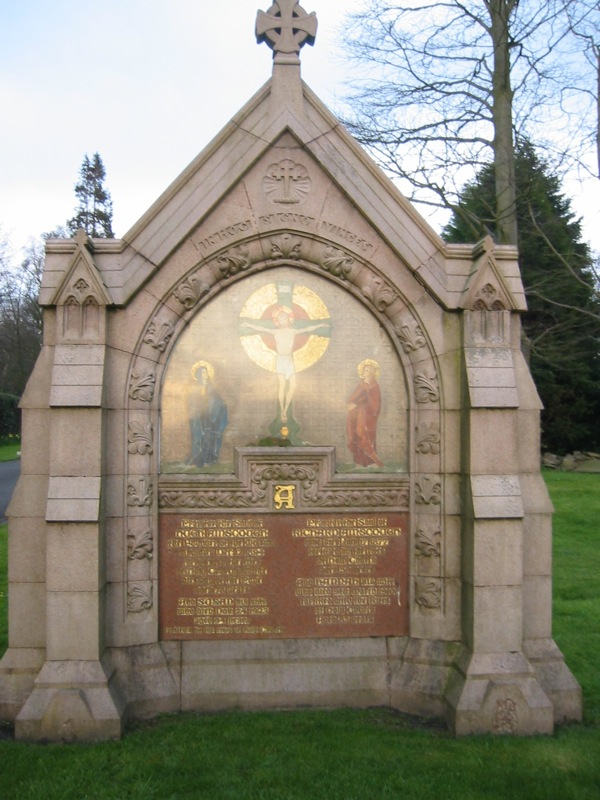
Memorial to Hugh and Richard Ainscough (H&R), Parbold churchyard. Image:Barbara Ainscough 2007

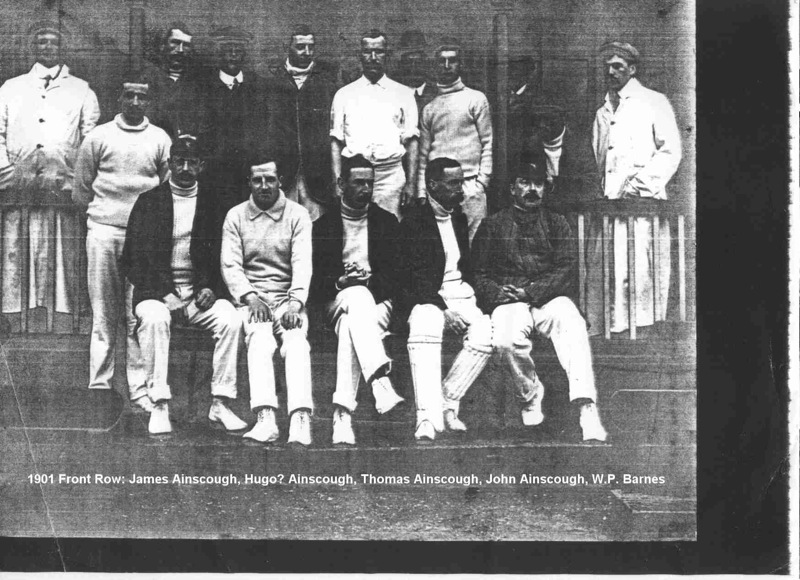
Thomas Ainscough, Lancashire Cricketer, OCC Team Photo 1901. Permission: Mary Ainscough 2007

- Hugh Ainscough (1816–1894) & Richard Ainscough (1818–1877), prosperous corn merchants, owners of two flour mills, Burscough (OS grid reference SD4411). Benefactors of Our Ladys and All Saints RC church, founded in 1884 (OS grid reference SD494109) and of the Catholic school in Parbold.
- Thomas Ainscough (1865–1927) first class cricketer. Major team Lancashire. Batting style Left-hand bat. Born 23 February 1865, at Lancaster House, Parbold. Died 20 November 1927. Captain of the Second Eleven and a member of the committee. Many times he appeared in big matches for Liverpool and District teams, and in games against Yorkshire made scores of 61 not out, 50 and 61. 7th child of Hugh AINSCOUGH (1816–1894) and Susan (FAIRCLOUGH) AINSCOUGH (1830–1923).
- Sir Thomas Martland Ainscough KBE (1886–1976), Colonial administrator. A native of Wigan, and son of a former Mayor of the Borough. 37 years of public service in the Department of Overseas Trade, the last 26 of them as H.M. Senior Trade Commissioner for India, Burma, and Ceylon. His parents were James and Margaret Ainscough, of Parbold, Mayor and Mayoress of Wigan in 1922–23. Sir Thomas married Marjorie Jones, who became Lady Ainscough, they remained married until his death, Lady Ainscough died in 1981, Her grandson Simon Martin resides quietly on the Isle of Wight.
- Captain Cyril Ainscough (1893–1915), 5th Bn, Manchester Regiment (Territorial), was killed in action in the Dardanelles on 7 August 1915 age 22 at Cape Helles Gallipoli, Turkey. Family home: Fairhurst Hall Parbold, Wigan. Listed in Burke's Landed Gentry Vol 2, 1969 pages 5 & 6.
- Anthony Lawrence Ainscough (1906–1986), Roman Catholic priest, later Prior of Ampleforth College. Born at Woodlands in Parbold, Wigan on 10 May 1906, he was the third and youngest son of Thomas and Jane Ainscough.
- Gerald Ainscough (1919–1985) – Founded Ainscough Crane Hire in 1976, Standish, Wigan, a crane hire company which employs 1,000 people.
- Martin Ainscough CBE (born 1952) – businessman who grew Ainscough Crane Hire until its sale in 2007 and the chairman of the Ainscough Group. The High Sheriff of Greater Manchester in 2025 and Deputy Lieutenant for the metropolitan county.
- John Whitwell Ainscough (1908–1992) engineer and Director of H&R Ainscough
- Major Oswald Whitwell Ainscough (1906–1995) of Casterton Hall, Kirkby Lonsdale, Westmorland, served in World War II 1939–45 as Major, 1st and 8th Bn Kings Regt in India and Burma. Director H. & R. Ainscough Ltd 1936–64; Director Liverpool Corn Trade Associate 1953–55; and Grain Contract Insurance Co 1953–55; Vice-Pres L.C.TA 1962; member Council N.F.C.TA 1962; Director Palace Hotel Co Southport 1934–50; and Casterton Estates Ltd from 1965;
- Gerry Ainscough born Wigan 1964, played Rugby Union for Orrell (1983 to 1992 and 1993 to 1995), Leicester (1992/93) and Leeds Tykes (1996 to 1998). Represented Lancashire, North of England, England 'B' and England VII's. Made history in 1988 when he played Rugby Union at Twickenham (County Championship Final) after first playing Rugby League at Wembley (under 11's schoolboy "curtain-raiser" to the 1975 Challenge Cup Final).
- Shaun Ainscough (born 27 November 1989 in Higher End, England) is an English professional rugby league player, currently playing for the Wigan Warriors Super League. Ainscough started his professional career playing for the Wigan club.

== Lincolnshire Ayscoughs (also known as Askews) ==
The following theory was put forward by researchers in the 1970s but seems unlikely, since earlier evidence has been found showing Ainscoughs existed in Lancashire prior to a possible migration from Lincolnshire.

The Lincolnshire Ayscough family originated from Bedale and owned estates around Stallingborough, Ashby, South Kelsey, Basford, Nuthall and Spalding. Ayscoughfee Hall, now a preserved manor house in Spalding, was originally built by the rich wool merchant, Richard Alwyn in 1420 and then it was owned by the Lincolnshire Ayscough family in the early part of the 16th century. The grant of land at Spalding was made to Sir William Ayscough (b.1490-d.1541) by Henry VIII. E.H. Gooch writes about "Ayscoughfee Hall" in his book "The History of Spalding", 1940.

In the 15th century the Ayscoughs had supported the Lancastrian side during the Wars of the Roses and later held posts at the Courts of Henry VII and Henry VIII. Sir William Askew of Stallingborough was knighted in 1513 during the reign of Henry VIII, his eldest son Sir Francis Ayscough was knighted "at the winning of Boulogne" and was Sheriff of Lincoln in 1545, 1549 and 1554. He died in 1564 and is buried at St Mary's Church, South Kelsey, Lincolnshire. Sir William's youngest son Edward Ayscough (d.1558) was cup-bearer to Henry VIII from 1539 to 1547. Anne Askew (Ayscough) Kyme (1521–1546), the English Protestant and persecuted heretic was also the daughter of Sir William. Unfortunately for Anne her zealousness led to her execution and she was burned at the stake for heresy in 1546. Reluctantly, the Ayscough family got caught up in the Lincolnshire Rising in 1536, a Catholic uprising against Henry VIII of England, against the dissolution of the monasteries. Sir William had ridden to Louth to keep the peace and uphold the law but instead found himself taken 'prisoner' by the rebels and was expected to represent their cause. Following this the Ayscough family fell out of favour with Henry VIII. However, Sir Francis continued to prosper by his own volition taking every opportunity to acquire land and so add to his estates. He died a convinced Protestant, clearly shown by the wording of his will. It is claimed (evidence required) that over the period which followed many of the Lincolnshire Ayscough family lost their estates, they migrated west to Lancashire, where they settled in the area around Mawdesley, near Croston, bleak wastes in the 16thC, as Farmers and Millers. However it does not seem possible to find specific evidence for this link, and without evidence the Lincolnshire origin seems increasingly tenuous. Researchers are requested to continue to investigate.

Sir Isaac Newton is also from an Ayscough family line, Hannah Ayscough his mother and possibly James Ascough born 1585, Ormskirk, Lancashire, his grandfather.

== Gloucestershire and Middlesex Askews ==
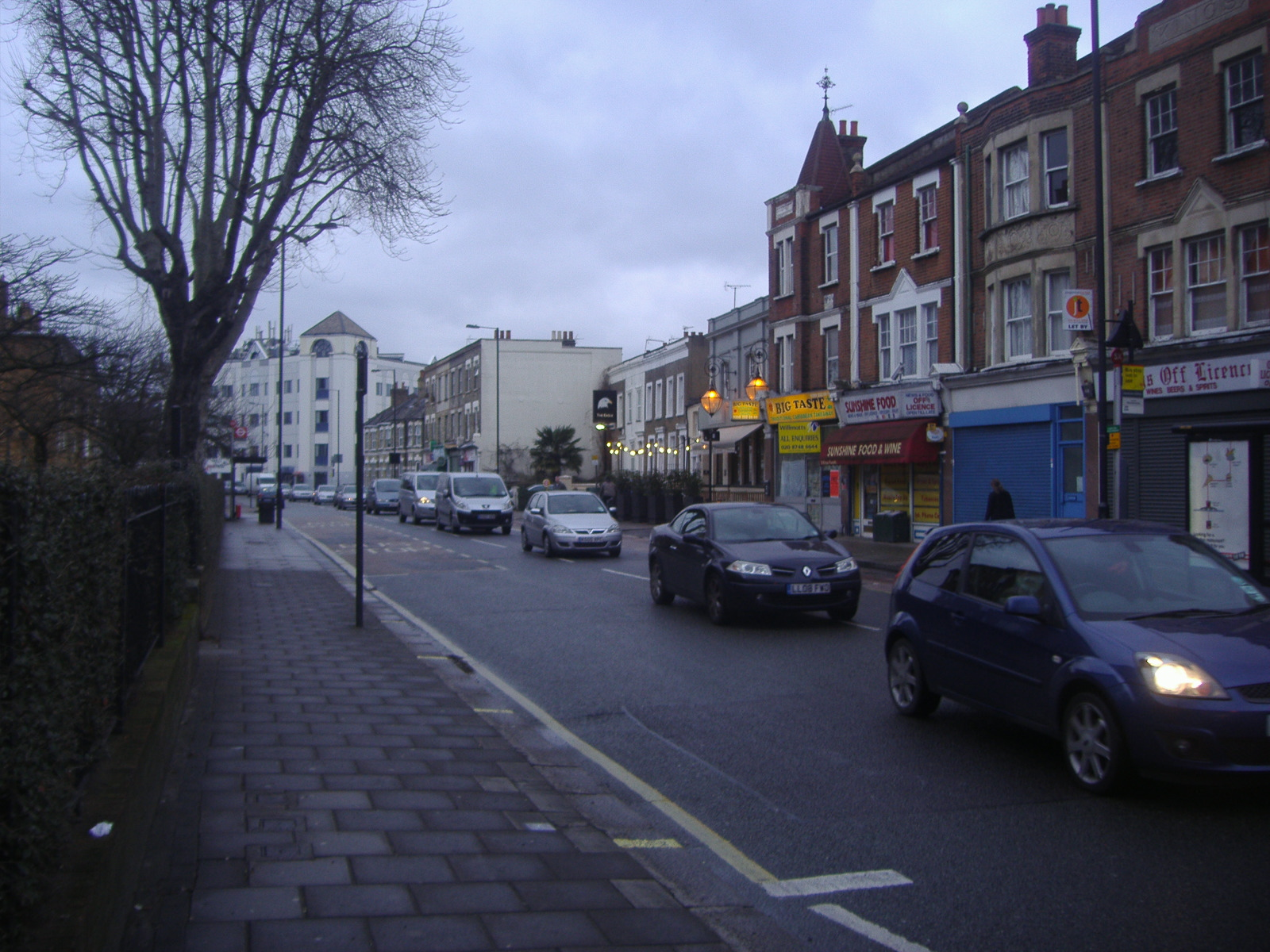
Askew Road, Shepherd's Bush

Another Askew family, from Gloucestershire, also owned land in Hammersmith, near Shepherd's Bush, historically part of Middlesex. Once the area was built up in the 19th century, a formerly rural road west of Shepherd's Bush, previously called Starch Green, was named Askew Road, while another nearby road was named Askew Crescent, both after the family. There was also once a pub at the north end of Askew Road called The Askew Arms, which is now an Irish pub.

== Expansion, employment and trade ==
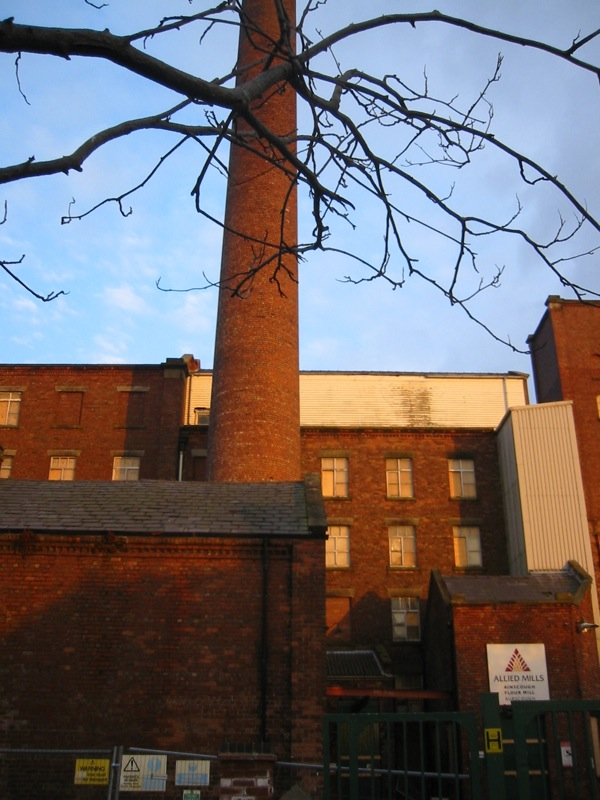
Derelict flour mill – H&R Millers, Burscough. Image: Barbara Ainscough 2007.

Early records come from the Churches of Croston, Ormskirk and Standish in Lancashire. Many Lancashire Ainscough families were Yeoman farmers and some of the family continued farming until the period of industrialisation. The Milling company of H & R Ainscough (Hugh and Richard of Parbold) established a successful business at Burscough and Southport. Branches of the family developed around Blackrod, and by the 19thC, across the whole of Lancashire. As industrialisation came to Lancashire, the women took work in cotton mills and the men on the railways, particularly the L&YR and the LMS.

In the early 19th century, most male – and some female – Ainscoughs in the villages of Blackrod, Haigh, Aspull were coal miners. They started as drawers, pulling coal carts, at the age of ten (until this was stopped by legislation), graduating to miners at around the age of sixteen. The area was rich in cannel coal, a high-grade, rich but volatile coal, and many mines were on the estate of the Earl of Crawford and Balcarres who lived at Haigh Hall. All but one of the five sons of Ralph (b.1782 in Blackrod) were miners – and nearly all male descendants of these Ainscoughs were also miners, as censuses from 1841 to 1901 attest. In the 1850s and 1860s, some of the Ainscough miners moved further afield to Westhoughton, Pemberton, Hindley and Ince, with some members of their families going into the silk and cotton weaving industries.

In 2006 several Ainscoughs featured in the Sunday Times Rich List.

== Catholic tradition ==
Many branches of the family maintained the Catholic tradition after the Reformation, for 300 years until religious tolerance eased in the 19th century, members of the family being charged with recusancy, as recorded in "Return of the Papists". Many became priests, most prominently Anthony Ainscough, Prior of Ampleforth Abbey. Business men H&R Ainscough Hugh and Richard Ainscough were the benefactors of the Catholic church, Our Lady & All Saints, Parbold founded 1884 and also the local Catholic primary school.

The Catholicism or otherwise of the Lancashire Ainscoughs in general is also open to speculation. Prior to the Reformation, of course, all English people were Catholic by default. Evidence suggests that the Lincolnshire-based line Ayscough families turned away from Catholicism and towards Lutheran beliefs through the turbulent Reformation and Tudor religious periods. Many other Lancashire Ainscoughs were baptised in the Anglican churches of St. Katherine in Blackrod, and St. Peter in Bolton-le-Moors (now modern Bolton). Wesleyan Methodism also appealed to many working-class people in the mid-19th century, who saw the Anglican church as a bastion of the upper, ruling class, and there were Wesleyan chapels in many towns – such as Chorley – in Lancashire – where Ainscoughs were married.

== Notable Australian Ainscoughs ==
- Roy Ainscough (b. 1943), who emigrated to Adelaide, South Australia to play semi-professional football for U.S.C.Lion in 1969, died on 9 October 2007 aged 64. Since his arrival in South Australia Roy had been involved will football (soccer) at all levels, mostly as a coach. Roy also represented South Australia on several occasions including a game against an English FA representative side.

Mr Ainscough was brought up in Rawmarsh and Parkgate and went on to become a hard tackling defender and midfielder for several top local sides. He died in the lakeside town of Barmera, South Australia, where he emigrated to in 1969 after leaving his job at the Parkgate Iron and Steel Company. His wife Carleen telephoned former Denaby United secretary Barrie Dalby with the sad news at the weekend. Beginning his footballing career at Wath Wanderers, Mr Ainscough moved to Rawmarsh Welfare in the Yorkshire League under the tutelage of former Rotherham United goalkeeper George Warnes. He then jumped into the Midland League with Denaby United under another former Football League shot stopper, ex-Barnsley keeper Harry Hough. Mr Ainscough was thrilled to be handed the opportunity to line up beside one of his idols, Millers legend Jack Grainger, who was playing on the wing for Denaby at the time. He also played for Mexborough Town who were an emerging force in the Yorkshire League but returned to Denaby's Tickhill Square ground which he always considered his true football home. The demise of the club greatly saddened Mr Ainscough and he was said to have never understood the reasons given by those responsible for what he saw as depriving the area of part of its heritage. On the day of the club's final match – 4 May 2002 – he made a poignant telephone call which was greatly appreciated by the team and officials. Despite being on the other side of the world he continued his keen interest in the fortunes of Rotherham United and was always proud of his South Yorkshire roots. He and his wife last visited the county in the autumn of 2000 and he stopped in at Tickhill Square to watch his old club and was delighted to meet up with former playing colleague Trevor Whittaker to reminisce about their time in the red and black. Mr and Mrs Ainscough had planned on coming over again earlier this year but unfortunately he was diagnosed with his illness. One of his regrets in his final months was the realisation that he would be unable to visit England again.

- Jamie Ainscough (b. 1972 Sydney), an Australian rugby league player for the Western Suburbs Magpies, Newcastle Knights, St George Illawarra Dragons, New South Wales and for the Australian national rugby league team. Ainscough played for Super League club Wigan Warriors.
- David Ainscough (b. 1958) Was an Australian business manager having completed his master's degree in business administration with the University of Adelaide in 1999. David also held a Graduate Diploma in Occupational Health and Safety Management from the University of South Australia. Mr Ainscough was born at the Glenelg Community Hospital and continued to reside in the City of Holdfast Bay region until his death on 13 June 2018, aged 59. At the height of his career he was employed as the Senior Manager Human Resources (Asia/Pacific Region) for global mining giant, Newmont Mining Corporation.

== Notable American Ainscoughs ==
- Thomas Lee Ainscough (b. 1936, d. 2026), is an American architect, interior designer, and writer. Having completed his teaching degree in art from Edinboro University of Pennsylvania. Thomas went on to study architecture at Carnegie Mellon University. In later years he started an architecture firm with Dan Dills called Dills, Ainscough & Associates. Later they added Daniel Duff and renamed the firm Dills, Ainscough, Duff & Associates. DAD designed buildings worldwide including many revolutionary schools. Thomas married Carolyn Martha Jones of Erie, Pennsylvania and lives in Utah. He served two missions for the Church of Jesus Christ of Latter-Day Saints in California and Florida.
