= Million Dollar Baby (disambiguation) =

Million Dollar Baby is a 2004 American sports drama film directed by Clint Eastwood.

Million Dollar Baby may also refer to:

- Million Dollar Baby (1934 film)
- Million Dollar Baby (1941 film)
- "Million Dollar Baby" (Ava Max song)
- "Million Dollar Baby" (Tommy Richman song)
- Million Dollar Baby (album), a 2024 album by Pixey

== See also ==
- Million Dollar Babies, 1994 television film
