= John Rigby (martyr) =

English Roman Catholic martyr

Saint John Rigby
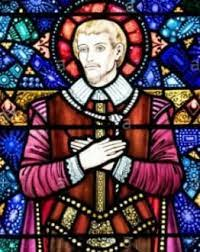

Martyr
- Born: ca. 1570; Eccleston, Lancashire
- Died: 21 June 1600 (aged 29 - 30); St. Thomas Waterings, England
- Venerated in: Roman Catholic Church
- Beatified: 15 December 1929, Rome by Pope Pius XI
- Canonized: 25 October 1970, Rome by Pope Paul VI
- Feast: 21 June, 25 October
- Attributes: noose in neck, martyr's palm, shackles in ankles
- Patronage: bachelors, torture victims

John Rigby (ca. 1570 – 21 June 1600) was an English Roman Catholic layman who was executed during the reign of Elizabeth I. He is one of the Forty Martyrs of England and Wales. (He is called "Thomas" Rigby in The Autobiography of a Hunted Priest, a story about the Jesuit priest John Gerard.)

== Life ==
Rigby was born circa 1570 at Harrock Hall, Wrightington, Lancashire (near Chorley, Lancashire), the fifth or sixth son of Nicholas Rigby, by his wife Mary (née Breres).

In 1600 Rigby was working as a steward for Sir Edmund Huddleston. Sir Edmund sent him to the sessions house of the Old Bailey to plead illness for the absence of his daughter, the widow Mrs. Fortescue, who had been summoned on a charge of recusancy. A commissioner then questioned Rigby about his own religious beliefs. Rigby acknowledged that he was Catholic, and was sent to Newgate. The next day, the feast day of St Valentine, he signed a confession saying that since he had been reconciled to the Roman Catholic faith by Saint John Jones, a Franciscan priest, in the Clink some two or three years previously, he had not attended Anglican services. He was sent back to Newgate and later transferred to the White Lion. Twice he was given the chance to recant, but twice refused. He told the judge that his sentence for treason "is the thing which I desire".

His sentence was carried out. He gave the executioner who helped him up to the cart a piece of gold, saying, "Take this in token that I freely forgive thee and others that have been accessory to my death." Rigby was hanged, drawn and quartered at St Thomas Waterings on 21 June 1600. Cut down too soon, he landed on his feet, but was thrown down and held while he was disembowelled. According to Challoner, "The people, going away, complained very much of the barbarity of the execution."

== Canonization ==
He was canonized in 1970; his feast day is 25 October. John Jones, the priest who had reconciled Rigby, had died at the same place Rigby had died, St Thomas Waterings, two years earlier, on 12 July 1598.

== Legacy ==
St John Rigby Roman Catholic Sixth Form College in Orrell, Metropolitan Borough of Wigan, Greater Manchester is named after John Rigby. One of its buildings, Harrock House, is named after Rigby's birthplace.

There are stained glass windows of Rigby in the following churches:

- Our Lady & All Saints Church, Parbold
