= Listed buildings in Parbold =

Parbold is a civil parish in the West Lancashire district of Lancashire, England. It contains 15 buildings that are recorded in the National Heritage List for England as designated listed buildings. Of these, two are at Grade II*, the middle grade, and the others are at Grade II, the lowest grade. The parish contains the large village of Parbold and the surrounding countryside. The Leeds and Liverpool Canal passes through the parish and the listed buildings associated with this are four bridges, two milestones, and a lock. The other listed buildings are houses, a farm building, a former windmill, a railway signal box, and two churches.

== Key ==
Grade	Criteria
II*	Particularly important buildings of more than special interest
II	Buildings of national importance and special interest

== Buildings ==
Name and location	Photograph	Date	Notes	Grade
Manor Cottage; 53.59219°N 2.75853°W	—	17th century	Originally a farmhouse with an attached shippon, later converted into one dwelling, and is in sandstone. The house has a stone-slate roof, is in two storeys, and the left part is gabled. The gable contains a re-set inscribed stone. In the right part is a mullioned window, and a window in a blocked doorway with an inscribed lintel. The former shippon to the left has a slate roof, and is in one storey with an attic. It has two windows in the ground floor, a dormer in the attic, and a doorway above which is a re-set datestone.	II
Barn, Fairhurst Hall; 53.59878°N 2.77170°W	—	Early 18th century	The barn is in sandstone with a stone-slate roof. In the south wall are a cart entrance with a segmental head and a hood mould, windows with plain reveals, external steps leading to a first-floor doorway, and a timber platform. The east gable wall contains a doorway with a segmental head, a hood mould with scrolled ends, and a central finial. There are also circular windows with keystones, and a circular owl hole.	II*
Parbold Hall; 53.59079°N 2.73932°W	—	1745 (possible)	A Georgian country house incorporating part of a house dating from about 1600. It is in sandstone with a hipped slate roof, and has two and three storeys. The entrance front has seven bays and is pedimented. In the centre is a portico that has a Venetian-style doorway with Doric features, and a fanlight rising into the pediment. Above the doorway is a window, also in Venetian style but with Ionic features. The other windows are sashes that have architraves with stepped keystones. At the rear are nine bays, the outer two bays on each side projecting forward.	II*
Alder Lane Bridge (No 38); 53.58823°N 2.76577°W		Early 1770s (probable)	The bridge carries Alder Lane (A5209 road) over the Leeds and Liverpool Canal. It is in sandstone and consists of a single elliptical arch. The bridge has a band below a parapet with coping.	II
Chapel Lane Bridge (No 39); 53.58627°N 2.75900°W		Early 1770s (probable)	The bridge carries Chapel Lane over the Leeds and Liverpool Canal. It is in sandstone and consists of a single elliptical arch. The bridge has a band below a parapet with coping.	II
Bridge No. 40; 53.58411°N 2.74556°W		Early 1770s (probable)	An accommodation bridge over the Leeds and Liverpool Canal, it is in sandstone. The bridge consists of a single elliptical arch, and has a band below a parapet with coping.	II
Hand Lane Bridge (No 41); 53.58301°N 2.73763°W		Early 1770s (probable)	An accommodation bridge over the Leeds and Liverpool Canal, it is in sandstone. The bridge consists of a single elliptical arch, and has a band below a parapet with coping.	II
Greystones; 53.59638°N 2.76692°W	—	c. 1800	A sandstone house with a stone-slate roof in two storeys and three bays. The doorway in the middle bay has a plain surround, and above it is a re-set inscribed plaque. The windows nave stone sills and lintels and plain reveals. All but one have a horizontal sliding sash.	II
Parbold Mill; 53.58856°N 2.77022°W		c. 1800	Originally a windmill, later converted into other uses. It is in sandstone, and has tapering walls and an embattled parapet. There are five storeys, most of the windows are casements, and in the ground floor is a doorway.	II
Western lock, Appley Locks; 53.58146°N 2.73311°W	—	Early 19th century (probable)	The lock is one of a pair on the northern by-pass channel of Appley Locks. Its chamber is lined with sandstone, there are double gates, a footbridge across the western end, and a spillway on the northern side.	II
Canal milestone 53.58640°N 2.76011°W	—	19th century	The milestone is by the towpath of the Leeds and Liverpool Canal. It is in cast iron with a triangular plan, and has plates inscribed with the distances in miles to Leeds and to Liverpool.	II
Canal milestone 53.58248°N 2.73672°W	—	19th century	The milestone is by the towpath of the Leeds and Liverpool Canal. It is in cast iron with a triangular plan, and has plates inscribed with the distances in miles to Leeds and to Liverpool.	II
Christ Church; 53.59065°N 2.75327°W		1875	The church stands on an elevated site, and was designed by Myres, Veevers and Myres. It is in sandstone with slate roofs, and consists of a nave with a south porch, a north aisle, a chancel with a north vestry, and a steeple to the south of the chancel. The steeple has a tower with angle buttresses, a south window, and an octagonal broach spire with lucarnes. At the west end of the nave are three lancet windows with a wheel window above. The east window contains Geometrical tracery.	II
Parbold Cabin Signal Box; 53.59078°N 2.77023°W		1877	The signal box was built for the Wigan to Southport line on the Lancashire and Yorkshire Railway, and is a Saxby and Farmer Type 9 box. The lower part and the north wall are in brick, the upper part is timber-framed, and there is a hipped slate roof. In the lower part of the south wall are three windows with segmental arches. Above there are rows of glazing, including horizontal sash windows. On the east side are external timber steps.	II
Church of Our Lady and All Saints; 53.59129°N 2.76393°W		1878–84	A Roman Catholic church by Edmund Kirby, it is in sandstone with slate roofs. The church consists of a tall west steeple, a nave with a clerestory, aisles, a south porch, a north transept, and a chancel with a south chapel and a south vestry. The steeple has a tower with angle buttresses, a west window, corner pinnacles, and a spire with lucarnes. Most of the windows are lancets, and there is a large east rose window.	II
