= Parish register =

Register with details of baptisms, marriages and burials

A parish register, alternatively known as a parochial register, is a handwritten volume, normally kept in the parish church of an ecclesiastical parish in which certain details of religious ceremonies marking major events such as baptisms (together with the dates and often names of the parents), marriages (with the names of both partners), and burials (within the parish) are recorded. Along with these events, church goods, the parish's business, and notes on various happenings in the parish may also be recorded. These records exist in England because they were required by law and for the purpose of preventing bigamy and consanguineous marriage.

The information recorded in registers was also considered significant for secular governments' own recordkeeping, resulting in the churches supplying the state with copies of all parish register entries. A good register permits the family structure of the community to be reconstituted as far back as the sixteenth century. Thus, these records can be distilled for the definitive study of the history of several nations' populations. They also provide insight into the lives and interrelationships of parishioners. Historically, a parish's churchwarden was responsible for certifying the parish register and submitting it alongside the churchwarden's accounts for annual examination by the bishop.

== History ==
=== England and Wales ===
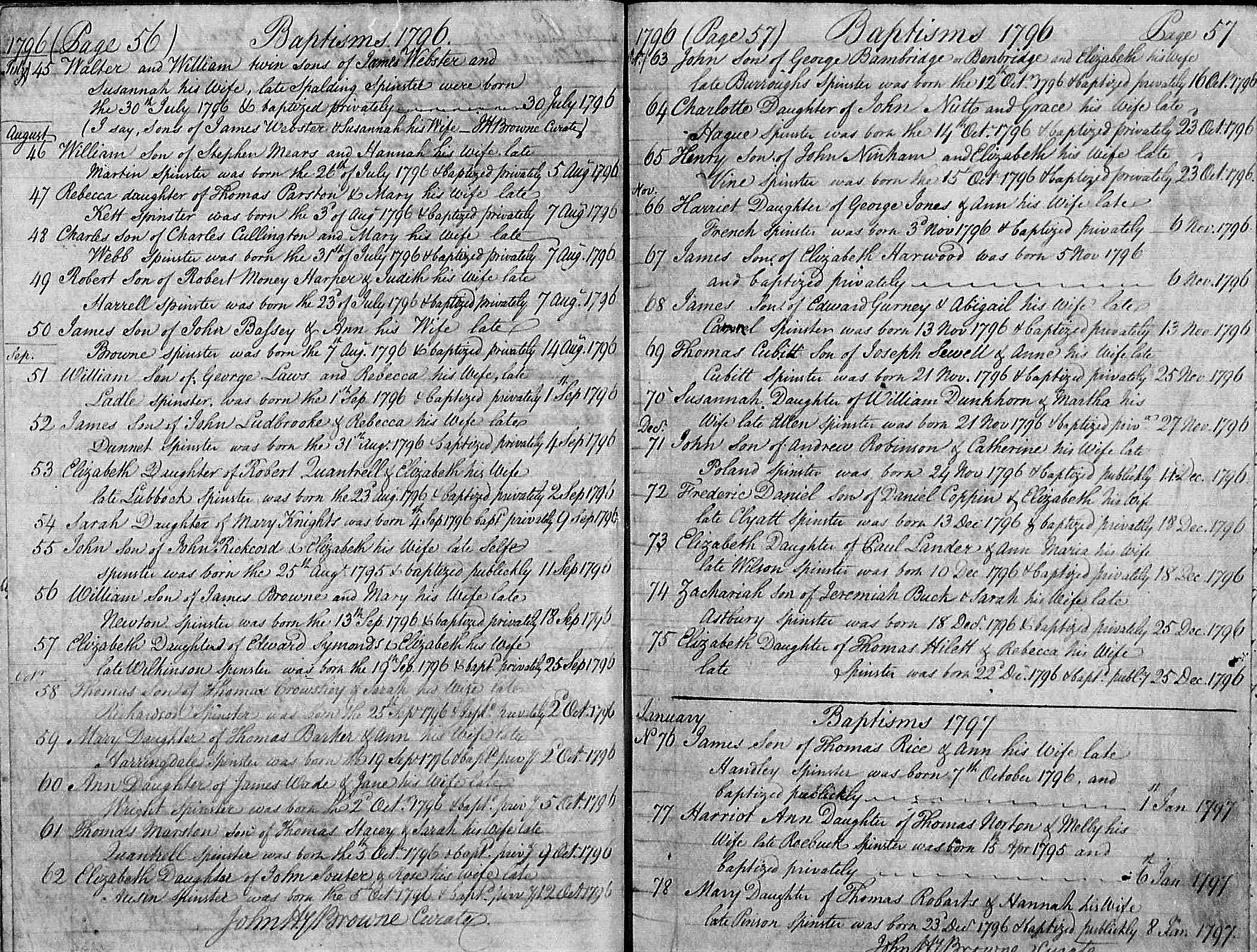
Baptismal register for St Stephen's Church, Norwich, open to show entries for baptisms between July 1796 and January 1797. Among them (third entry on right hand page, on 23 October 1796) is that for Henry Ninham, later an artist.

Parish registers were formally introduced in England and Wales on 5 September 1538 shortly after the formal split with Rome in 1534, when Thomas Cromwell, chief minister to Henry VIII, acting as his Vicar General, issued an injunction requiring that in each parish of the Church of England registers of all baptisms, marriages, and burials be kept. Before this, a few Roman Catholic religious houses and parish priests had kept informal notes on the baptisms, marriages, and burials of the prominent local families and obituaries of holy persons. This injunction was addressed to the rector or vicar of every church parish in England. By contrast, surviving Roman Catholic communities were discouraged from keeping similar records, as they needed their names to remain hidden in a country now hostile to the Church of Rome. Cromwell's order had, however, nothing to do with religious doctrine or the papacy, but rather indicated the desire of the central government to have better knowledge of the population of the country. Church historian Diarmaid MacCulloch has suggested that the measure may have been introduced as a means to identify infiltration into England by members of the outlawed Anabaptist sects: their adherents did not baptise infants, due to their doctrine that only active believers could be baptised, thereby excluding "dumb" or "unmindful" children. The book was to be kept in a "sure coffer" with two locks and keys, one held by the parish priest and one by the churchwardens. A fine of 3 shillings, 4 pence was to be levied for failure to comply. Many parishes ignored this order as it was commonly thought that it presaged a further tax.

Finally, in 1597, both Queen Elizabeth I and the Church of England's Convocation reaffirmed the injunction, adding that the registers were of permagnus usus and must be kept in books of parchment leaves. They mandated the keeping of duplicate registers or bishop's transcripts, ordering that annually copies of every parish's records of baptism, marriage, and burial be sent into the diocesan bishop's registrar. These records survive sporadically from this date and may make up for some gaps in the regular parish register due to war, carelessness, and loss due to other causes (fire, etc.). At the same time, all previous parish records (most found in a less durable form) had to be copied into the new sturdier books. The parish clerk was paid to copy the old records into a new parchment book in order to keep the record up to date.

During the English Civil War (1643–1647), and in the following periods of the Commonwealth and Protectorate, when the Church of England was suppressed and bishops abolished and replaced by Calvinist ministers under the Directory, records were poorly kept and many went missing after being destroyed (bored by beetles, chewed by rats or rendered illegible by damp) or hidden by the displaced Anglican clergy. Instead, for a brief period a civil official, confusingly also called the parish register, was elected locally and approved by two local justices of the peace. Often a semi-literal layman of Puritan hue, he was charged with keeping civil records of birth, marriage, and death in each parish for the balance of the Interregnum, and, in some cases, he even wrote his records into the old parish register. In the course of this passage from Anglican safekeeping to civil hands, however, many records were lost. The old format was re-adopted by the restored Church of England when the monarchy was restored in May 1660. Centuries later, this parsimony and neglect was belatedly remedied by depositing the surviving registers in county record offices where they were better safeguarded, conserved, and made accessible mostly on microfilm as that technology became available. On the other hand, the accurate parish registers of New France were rarely damaged by external events such as war, revolution, and fire. Thus, 300,000 entries were available for the time period 1621 to 1760.

In England, the Parochial Registers Act 1812 (52 Geo. 3. c. 146), an "Act for the better regulating and preserving Parish and other Registers of Birth, Baptisms, Marriages, and Burials, in England" was passed It stated that "amending the Manner and Form of keeping and of preserving Registers of Baptisms, Marriages, and Burials of His Majesty's Subjects in the several Parishes and Places in England, will greatly facilitate the Proof of Pedigrees of Persons claiming to be entitled to Real or Personal Estates, and otherwise of great public Benefit and Advantage". Separate, printed registers were to be supplied by the King's Printer, and used for baptisms, marriages and burials. These are more or less unchanged to this day.

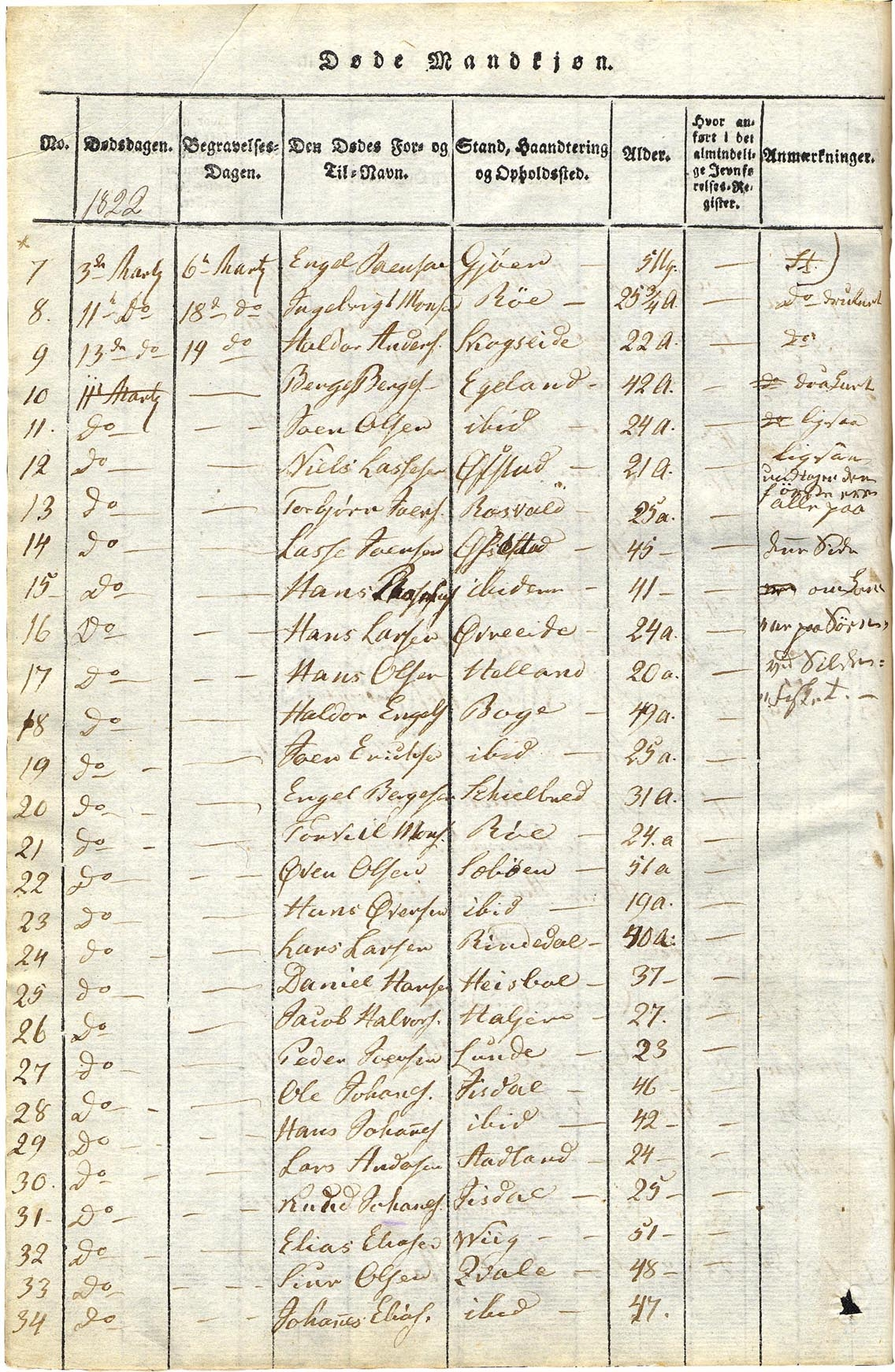
Church register at Os Parish in Hordaland, Norway, of March 1822

=== United States ===
In the United States, at least the parishes in the Roman Catholic dioceses maintained a similar practice of recording baptisms, marriages, burials, and often also confirmations and first communions. From the earliest pioneer churches ministered by itinerant priests, the records were written in ecclesiastical Latin. But after the Second Vatican Council and its reforms that included translating the Mass into local languages, most register entries gradually came to be written in English. In Protestant communions with stronger similarities to Roman Catholicism, parish registers are also important sources that document baptisms, marriages, and funerals. In Protestant and Evangelical churches, individual ministers often kept records of faith-related events among the congregation, but under much less guidance from any central governing body.

=== Italy ===
The parish register became mandatory in Italy for baptisms and marriages in 1563 after the Council of Trent and in 1614 for burials when its rules of compilation were as well normalised by the Church. Prior to 1563, the oldest registers of baptisms are preserved since 1379 in Gemona del Friuli, 1381 in Siena, 1428 in Florence or 1459 in Bologna.

=== France ===
In France, parish registers have been in use since the Middle Ages. The oldest surviving registers date back to 1334 and are posted in Givry. Other existing registers prior to orders of civil legislation in 1539 reside in Roz-Landrieux 1451, Paramé 1453, Lanloup 1467, Trans-la-Forêt 1479 and Signes 1500.

The parish register became mandatory in France for baptisms with the Ordinance of Villers-Cotterêts signed into law by Francis I of France on August 10, 1539, then for marriages and burials with the Ordinance of Blois in 1579. They had to be sent every year to the bailiwick or sénéchaussée in the south of France. In April 1667, the Ordinance of Saint-Germain-en-Laye ordered a copy to be kept by the parish clergy as before the ordinance. By decree of the National Assembly of September 20, 1792, the keeping of the civil registers was given to mayors and the old parish registers went then to the public records of the archives communales, and the old bailiwick registers to the archives departementales created in 1796. But from 1795, the parish again kept some private registers, like the registres de catholicité for the Catholic Church which are also made in duplicate, one for the parish and one for the diocesan archives. The legalization of these documents, functioning both as a means of census as well as civil documentation, has in some cases been used to restore official acts of civil status such as after the downfall of the Paris commune and the reconstruction of Le Palais de Justice after the fires of 1871.

=== New France ===
The first Europeans to settle in North America continued the practice of establishing parish registers. Shortly after the establishment of Habitation, the arrival of Jesuit priests in 1615 facilitated the earliest beginnings of the parish register in New France.These earliest accounts entered into the register were recorded primarily within the Jesuits personal logs, and accounted exclusively for the number of deaths in the early settlement period of Quebec. However, over time the growing French population propagated the development and detailing of the parish register. Entries detailing births, marriages, baptisms and deaths were recorded and kept in the church of Notre Dame-de-la-Recouvrance. Unfortunately, in 1640 the church burned along with all parish records from 1620 to 1640. After the church burned, the parish priest commissioned at Notre Dame-de-la-Recouverance reconstructed the destroyed register entries from memory by recording the rather limited number of births, baptisms and marriages to take place within the colony during this 20-year period. Deaths however, were not recorded in the reconstructed registers and as a consequence there is no recorded account of the death of Samuel de Champlain who died in 1635.

Although the creating and maintaining parish registers in Europe had been in practice since the Middle Ages, legislation regarding the widespread and legal use of parish registers in France was officially passed into law with the signing of the Ordnance of Villers-Cotterets in 1539. However, it was not until 1666 where after perceiving the immense advantages to be gained through civil registration that King Louis XIV revitalized the parish registration system in France and her colonies. This edict, set forth by the king, made it compulsory for individuals to register within their parish communities. Moreover, in 1667 the king revealed the Ordonnance de Saint Germain en Laye, a piece of legislation which required parish priests to produce a duplicate of all registers so that all copies may be stored in emerging records offices. In New France, these duplicates were stored in Quebec and Montreal's Courts of Justice official records office and listed New France's Roman Catholic population exclusively. It was only until after cession and the British conquest of New France in 1760 that parish registers began to more openly include Protestants within the registry, and as civil subjects of Quebec.

=== Sweden ===
Parish registers have been kept for each parish by the Church of Sweden for some Swedish counties (Västmanland and Dalarna) since the 1620s, and generally for the whole Sweden since the 1670s. The church was ordered to keep even more detailed church books in king Charles XI's Church Law from 1686. The primary motivation was to keep track of the number of soldiers that were taken out from each parish, and that were financed by each parish, through the allotment system that was introduced in 1682. Another motivation was to keep track of religious knowledge, literacy and health among the population. The church books constitute of birth, death, marriage and moving in/out records, all of which were linked to the parish catechetical book, which was replaced in 1895 by the parish book. In country side parishes, each village or industrial town had its own section in the catechetical book, each farmyard its own page, and each person its own row. For city parishes, the book was divided into districts. The majority of church records are still preserved in the state archives, and available electronically over the Internet.

== Contents and examples from England ==
The contents have changed over time, not being standardised in England until the Acts of 1753 and 1812. The following are among what you can expect to find in later registers, though in the earlier ones it is quite common to find only names recorded. Early entries will be in some form of Latin, often abbreviated.

=== Baptisms ===
- Date of baptism
- Date of birth (but this is often not recorded)
- Child's forename
- Child's surname (though normally omitted as father's name is assumed)
- Father's name — blank if illegitimate
- Mother's name (but this is often not recorded)
- Father's occupation or rank
- Place of birth (for large parishes)
- Examples:
1. Baptised 21 August 1632 William son of Francis Knaggs
2. Baptism 5 January 1783 Richard son of Thomas Knaggs, farmer, and his wife Mary, born 6 December 1782

=== Marriages ===
- Date of marriage
- For both man and woman
  - Forename and Surname
  - Whether bachelor or spinster, widower or widow
  - Age
  - Whether of-this-parish or of some other place
  - Occupation (normally man only)
  - Father's forename, surname and occupation or rank
  - Signature
- Whether by Banns or by Licence
- Witness(es) signature(s)
- Note: from 1837, the information contained in parish records is the same as that on a civil marriage certificate.
- Examples:
1. Married 2 May 1635 Francis Ducke and Anne Knaggs
2. Married 16 May 1643 Leonard Huntroids yeoman of Brafferton and Lucy Knaggs widow of this parish
3. [1643 Marriages] Alexander Mackree et Anna Hancocke undecimo die men(sis) Julii nupti fuerent Annoq(ue) predicto
4. Married 11 August 1836 Richard Knaggs the younger, age 20, bachelor, farmer of Kilham and Elizabeth Wilson, age 25, spinster of this parish, by licence and with the consent of those whose consent is required

=== Burials ===
- Date of burial
- Name of deceased
- Age of deceased
- Occupation, rank or relationship of deceased
- Normal place of abode of deceased
- Examples:
1. Buried 6 January 1620 Richard Knags
2. Buried 4 November 1653 stillborn daughter of Raiph Knaggs of Ugthorpe
3. Buried 25th Dec 1723 Mr George Knaggs, gent of Pollington, aged 74
4. Buried 19 July 1762 Thomas Knaggs, son of Thomas tailor of Byers Green and Elizabeth, age 13, drowned, double fees

=== Dade and Barrington registers ===
Dade and Barrington registers are detailed registers that contain more information than standard contemporary baptism and burial registers. They usually commence in the late eighteenth century, but come to an end in 1812, when they were superseded by the requirements of George Rose's Parochial Registers Act 1812, which required more information to be recorded than in normal registers, but actually required less information to be recorded than in Dade and Barrington registers. There are examples of a few parishes continuing to keep Dade or Barrington registers after 1813. In some cases, two registers were kept, for example in the County Durham parish of Whickham both Barrington and Rose registers were kept for the period 1813–1819, after which the former were discontinued.

==== Dade registers ====
William Dade, a Yorkshire clergyman of the 18th century, was ahead of his time, in seeing the value of including as much information on individuals in the parish register as possible. In 1777 Archbishop William Markham decided that Dade's scheme of registration forms should be introduced throughout his diocese. The resulting registers, and some that are related, are now known as "Dade registers". The baptismal registers were to include child's name, seniority (e.g. first son), father's name, profession, place of abode and descent (i.e. names, professions and places of abode of the father's parents), similar information about the mother, and mother's parents, the infant's date of birth and baptism. Registers of this period are a gold-mine for genealogists, but the scheme was so much work for the parish priests that it did not last long.

In 1770 Dade wrote in the parish register of St. Helen's, York: "This scheme if properly put in execution will afford much clearer intelligence to the researches of posterity than the imperfect method hitherto generally pursued." His influence spread and the term Dade register has come to describe any parish registers that include more detail than expected for the time.

The application of this system was somewhat haphazard and many clergymen, particularly in more populated areas, resented the extra work involved in making these lengthy entries. The thought of duplicating them for the Bishop's Transcripts put many of them off and some refused to follow the new rules.

==== Barrington registers ====
From about 1783, as Lord Bishop of Salisbury, the Rt Rev. Shute Barrington instigated a similar system somewhat simpler than Dade's, and followed this in Northumberland and Durham from 1798, when he was transferred to the diocese of Durham.

== Transcriptions and indices ==
Most registers in the world have been deposited in diocesan archives or county record offices. Where these have been filmed, copies are available to scan from the Church of Jesus Christ of Latter-day Saints through the Family History Library. Microfiche copies of parish registers, along with transcriptions, are usually available at larger local libraries and county record offices.

=== England ===
Since Victorian times, amateur genealogists have transcribed and indexed parish registers. Some societies have also produced printed transcripts and indexes – notably the Parish Register Society, the Harleian Society and Phillimore & Co. The Society of Genealogists, in London, has a very large selection of such transcripts and indexes. The Family History Library in Salt Lake City also has a vast collection of films of original registers.

The Church of Jesus Christ of Latter-day Saints has also produced an index (the IGI), of very many register entries – mostly baptisms and marriages. The IGI is available as an online database and on microform matter at local "Family History Centers". Like all transcripts and indexes, the IGI should be used with caution, as errors can occur in legibility of the original or microfilm of the original, in reading the original handwriting, and in entering the material to the transcription. "Batch entries" are generally more reliable than "individual submissions."

== See also ==
- Civil registry
- Family register
- Nonconformist register
- Parish and Civil Registers in Paris

== Bibliography ==
Delsalle, Paul. 2009. Histoires de familles: les registres paroissiaux et d'état civil, du Moyen Âge à nos jours : démographie et généalogie. Besançon: Presses universitaires de Franche-Comté.

Greer, Allan. 1997. The People of New France. Toronto: University of Toronto Press.

Isbled, Bruno. "Le Premier Registre de Baptemes de France: Roz-Landrieux (1451)”. Place Public. April 2011. http://www.placepublique-rennes.com/article/Le-premier-registre-de-baptemes-de-France-Roz-Landrieux-1451-

Law, James Thomas. "The ecclesiastical statutes at large, extr. and arranged by J.T. Law."

Milza, Pierre. 2009. "L'année terrible". [2], [2]. "L'année Terrible". Paris: Perrin.

Pounds, N.J.G., 2000. A History of the English Parish: The Culture of Religion from Augustine to Victoria. Cambridge University.

"Parochial Registers". Catholic Encyclopedia. New York: Robert Appleton Company. 1913.

Parrot, Paul. "History of Civil Registration in Quebec". Canadian Public Health Journal 21, no. 11 (1930) 529 –40.

R.B. Outhwaite, Clandestine Marriage in England, 1500–1850". 1998. Tijdschrift Voor Rechtsgeschiedenis / Revue D'Histoire Du Droit / The Legal History Review. 66 (1–2): 191–192.

Rose's Act http://freepages.genealogy.rootsweb.ancestry.com/~framland/acts/1812Act.htm

Sheils, William Joseph. "Dade, William". Oxford Dictionary of National Biography (online ed.). Oxford University Press.
