= Pixey =

English musician (born 1995)

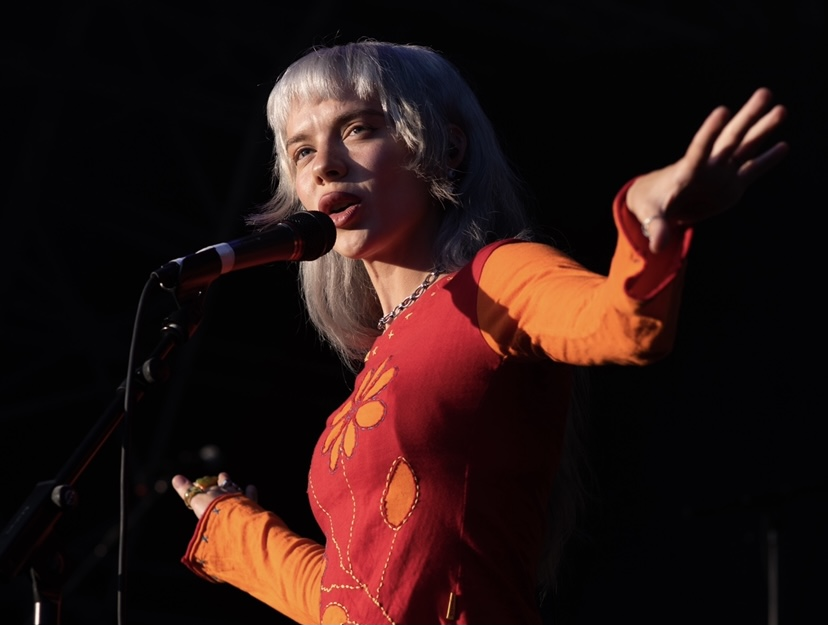
- Pixey performing at Dreamland Margate in 2022

Background information
- Born: Elizabeth Sinead Hillesdon; 12 March 1995 (age 31); Ormskirk, West Lancashire, England
- Genres: Indie pop; alternative pop; synth-pop
- Instruments: Vocals; guitar; piano; bass guitar; synthesiser; drums
- Years active: 2016–present
- Label: Chess Club
- Website: www.pixeymusic.bandcamp.com

Elizabeth Sinead Hillesdon (born 12 March 1995), known professionally as Pixey, is an English singer-songwriter, multi-instrumentalist and producer. She began recording and releasing demos in 2016, and made her professional debut in 2020.

== Early life ==
Elizabeth Sinead Hillesdon was born on 12 March 1995 in Ormskirk, West Lancashire and grew up in Parbold, attending school in Liverpool. Although surrounded by the music of Kate Bush and Björk growing up, Pixey did not begin to play music herself until recovering from a life-threatening viral infection at the age of twenty. Then, teaching herself guitar and learning how to produce using Ableton Live, she began making music with a DIY approach inspired by that of Mac DeMarco.

== Career ==
Pixey self-released "Hometown" and "Young" to Spotify in 2016, and the latter won attention from BBC Radio 1 and received regular airplay. She recruited musicians from the Liverpool Institute for Performing Arts and performed regularly at local Liverpool venues such as the Jacaranda. After a brief tenure with Liverpool-based independent label Modern Sky, Pixey self-released her debut EP, Colours, in 2019, which featured "Young" and a re-recorded version of "Hometown".

During the COVID-19 lockdown of 2020, Pixey signed to London-based independent record label Chess Club, and released her professional debut single, "Just Move". This was followed by two further singles, "Free to Live in Colour" and "Electric Dream", which both received widespread radio and press attention.

Pixey was included in the 2021 NME 100, a list of "essential emerging artists for 2021".

Following the release of the three singles, Pixey's Chess Club debut EP, Free to Live in Colour, was released on 23 March 2021. Shortly after, she announced a second EP, Sunshine State, co-produced by Pete Robertson of the Vaccines. Released on 29 October 2021, it was promoted by three singles: "Sunshine State", "Life in Stereo", and "Take Me On". In December 2021, she released the documentary Pixey - In a Sunshine State to YouTube. Directed by Marieke Macklon, it documented the making of the Sunshine State EP and featured performance footage of Pixey and her live band.

In March 2022, Pixey embarked on a tour of the UK supporting labelmate Alfie Templeman. This was followed by a sold-out headline show at The Windmill, Brixton. Throughout the year she performed at festivals such as Tramlines, Y Not, LIMF, and Truck, and supported DMA's, Tom Grennan, the Libertines, and Miles Kane.

In June 2022, Pixey released "Come Around (Sunny Day)" and hinted that it was the first single of an upcoming project. In July, she announced that her mini-album, Dreams, Pains & Paper Planes, would be set for release in September, and dropped another single, "Recycled Paper Planes". A third single, "I'm Just High", was premiered on Clara Amfo's BBC Radio 1 Future Sounds show, and Dreams, Pains & Paper Planes was released on 30 September. Pixey performed songs from the mini-album live at Maida Vale Studios for Jack Saunders' BBC Radio 1 Future Artists show. A fourth, promotional single, "Melody (From You to Me)", was premiered on Dean & Vicky’s daytime BBC Radio 1 show on 3 November.

Pixey's collaboration with Mint Royale on a cover of the Charlatans' "One to Another" was the theme song for the BT Sport 2022–23 Premier League season.

In 2023, "Just Move" was used as the theme song for both the Liverpool FC 2023/24 kit launch and the BBC broadcast of the FIFA Women's World Cup. In August she supported Ellie Goulding for the AIG Women's Open.

Pixey’s debut album, Million Dollar Baby, was released on 2 August 2024 to positive critical reception, reaching number five on the UK Independent Chart, number seven on the UK vinyl chart, and number 54 on the Scottish Album Chart.

== Musical style and influences ==
Pixey’s music is characterised by breakbeats, reverb-laden guitar, and sampling. Her musical style has primarily been described as indie pop, alternative pop, pop rock, and dream pop. In various specified songs, critics have also noted elements of indie rock, psychedelic pop, bubblegum pop, sampledelia, breakbeat hardcore, and '90s baggy.

Pixey cites George Harrison, De La Soul, Nick Drake, William Onyeabor, Kate Bush, Björk, Grimes, the Verve, the Prodigy, Fatboy Slim, Beck, and the Beatles as musical influences, as well as the ‘90s Madchester scene.

== Discography ==
Studio albums

- Million Dollar Baby (2024)

Mini-albums

- Dreams, Pains & Paper Planes (2022)

EPs

- Colours (2019)
- Free to Live in Colour (2021)
- Sunshine State (2021)

Singles

- "Hometown" (demo) (2016)
- "Young" (2016)
- "Supersonic Love" (2019)
- "Young" / "Supersonic Love (Summer Version)" (2020, vinyl-only)
- "Just Move" (2020)
- "Free to Live in Colour" (2020)
- "Electric Dream" (2021)
- "Electric Dream (Piano Version)" (2021)
- "Sunshine State" (2021)
- "Life in Stereo" (2021)
- "Take Me On" (2021)
- "Come Around (Sunny Day)" (2022)
- "One to Another" (with Mint Royale) (2022)
- "Recycled Paper Planes" (2022)
- "I'm Just High" (2022)
- "Daisy Chain" (with Tayo Sound) (2023)
- "The Thrill of It" (2024)
- "Million Dollar Baby" (2024)
- "Bring Back the Beat" (2024)
- "Give a Little of Your Love" (2024)
- "Cherry Bomb" (2025)

As featured artist

- Blondes – "Coming of Age (End Credits Version)" (2023)
- Abbie Ozard – "Miss American Dream" (2024)
- Courteeners - "First Name Terms" (2024)

Music videos

- "Just Move"
- "Electric Dream"
- "The Mersey Line"
- "Sunshine State"
- "Take Me On"
- "Heaven"
- "Come Around (Sunny Day)"
- "I'm Just High"
- "Daisy Chain" (Lullaby Version)
- "The Thrill of It"
- Abbie Ozard feat. Pixey - "Miss American Dream"
- "Million Dollar Baby"
- "Bring Back the Beat"
- "Cherry Bomb"
