= William Askew =

English politician

Sir William Askew (also spelled Ascough or Ainscough or Ascue; 1490–1540 or 1541) was a gentleman at the court of Henry VIII of England. He was one of the jurors in the trial of Anne Boleyn and was the father of Anne Askew, one of only two women to be tortured at the Tower of London, along with Margaret Cheyne.

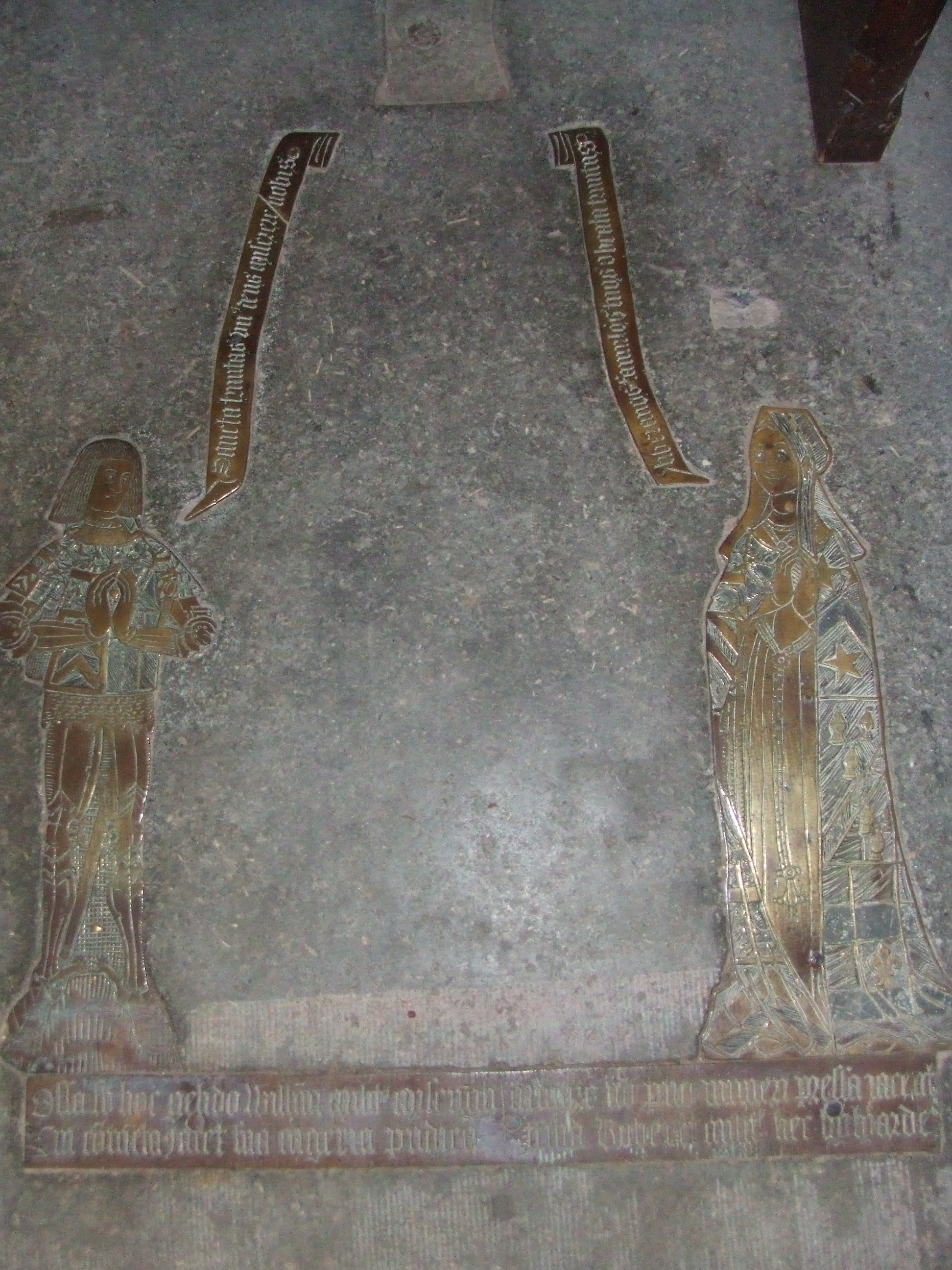
Medieval brass of Ayscough and his wife, Stallingborough church

He was born the eldest son of Sir William Askew of Stallingborough, Lincolnshire, who he succeeded in 1510.

He was knighted at Tournai in 1513 when serving on the French campaign and in 1520 accompanied King Henry VIII, together with other knights, to the famous meeting with King Francis I of France at the Field of the Cloth of Gold.

He was a Member of the Parliament of England in 1529 for Great Grimsby.

He married three times; first in 1508 to Elizabeth, the daughter of Thomas Wrottesley of Wrottesley, Staffordshire, with whom he had two sons and three daughters, second to the daughter of a Struxley or Streichley of Nottinghamshire and third in 1522 to Elizabeth, the daughter of John Hutton of Tudhoe and the widow of Sir William Hansard of South Kelsey, Lincolnshire, with whom he had two sons.

He was described as a welcome guest in Mary's household in 1536, His daughter, Anne Askew, married Thomas Kyme. Her repudiation of this marriage and her disbelief in the doctrine of transubstantiation led to her torture and execution, burnt at the stake in 1546.

William Askew died in 1541, five years before his daughter's execution. He was buried at Stallingborough.
