= Society of Genealogists =

United Kingdom educational charity

- Society of Genealogists' badge
- Abbreviation: SoG
- Formation: 1911
- Headquarters: 40 Wharf Road, Islington, London
- Members: 6,654
- Website: www.sog.org.uk

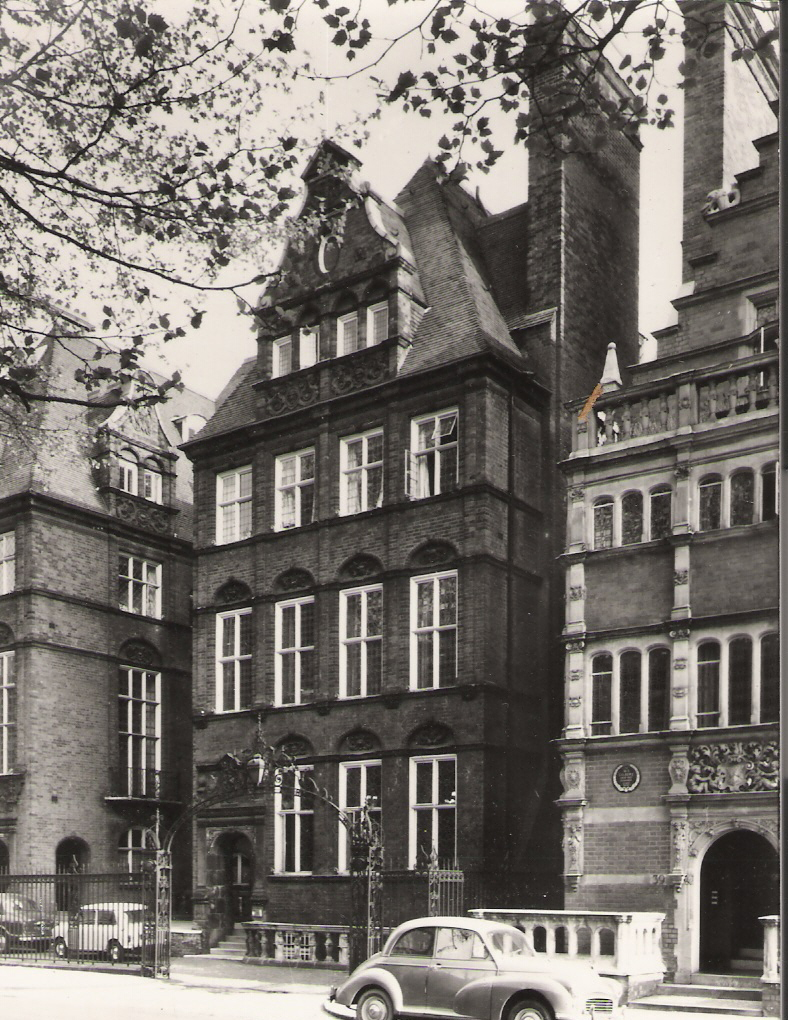
Before moving to north London, the SoG owned & operated from this building at 37 Harrington Gardens, near Gloucester Road tube station SW7.

The Society of Genealogists (SoG) is a UK-based educational charity, founded in 1911 to "promote, encourage and foster the study, science and knowledge of genealogy". The Society's Library is the largest specialist genealogical library outside North America. Membership is open to any adult who agrees to abide by the Society's rules and who pays the annual subscription. At the end of 2023, it had 6,654 members.

== History ==
The society was founded in 1911 by George Sherwood, Charles Bernau, Gerald Fothergill, Edgar Francis Briggs and Dr William Bradbrook.

It was the Hertfordshire antiquary, William Blyth Gerish, who suggested the foundation of the Society and his proposal, made in a letter to Notes & Queries, was taken up by Charles Bernau, the author of The Genealogy of the Submerged, a meeting was held, further invitations were sent out, and fifty interested people provided a fund to incorporate the Society. The document is dated 8 May 1911.

The object of the early members, who met in Sherwood's office at 227 The Strand, was to transcribe and index original material and to make it readily available in one place. The group's committees intended to form pressure groups to obtain easier access to records of all kinds.

An early rapid growth in the collections, amongst them 43 volumes compiled by Mrs Vernona Smith on the West Indies, and 51 volumes of Berkshire material bequeathed by Frederick Simon Snell, necessitated the first move to larger premises from The Strand to the first floor of 5 Bloomsbury Square, in 1914.

In October 1911 a committee, chaired by Fothergill, had been appointed to communicate with the Registrar General and others with a view to gaining access to the Census Returns of 1841 and 1851 but although the Registrar General replied in January 1912 that 'administrative difficulties prevent their being thrown open as desired', the Public Record Office (now The National Archives) wrote on 6 June 1912 to say that the Secretary of State had authorised the production of the records at the Record Office of the Enumeration Schedules of both censuses 'on payment of the fees fixed by the Master of the Rolls, viz. 1s. for one piece, and 2s.6d. for each set of 10 pieces' and in 1952 the PRO was responsible for getting the Home Office and the Treasury to agree to the abolition of the fees for the inspections of both returns.

In 1916 the first monthly lecture was held and in 1919, whilst Lord Raglan was President, Queen Mary accepted patronage of the Society. In 1922 under the long Presidency of Lord Farrer work started on the transcription and indexing of the Apprentices of Great Britain (1710-1774), which Fothergill had recently discovered at Somerset House, and the society received from W.H. Welply eighteen volumes of abstracts of Irish wills and pleadings, following the destruction of the Irish Record Office that year. On 12 September 1924 by Special Resolution of an Extraordinary Meeting the Society of Genealogists of London, with permission of the Board of Trade, the Society omitted the 'of London' from its name. In April 1925, following the demise of the periodical The Genealogist, the Society began its own quarterly journal The Genealogists' Magazine, and Percival Boyd started work on the Marriage Index which bears his name. By the time of his death in 1955, Boyd had indexed the marriages in most transcribed English parish registers and the index contained over six million entries. The long secretaryship, 1930-50, of Mrs Kathleen Blomfield gave stability to the Society. In 1932 a debate on the 'Companions of the Conqueror' was held, with contributions by the Librarian Dr T.R. Thomson, Geoffrey White and others, Thomson having produced the first edition of his A Catalogue of British Family Histories in 1928.

In 1933 the second move took place, this time to a large room at Chaucer House, Malet Place, leased from the Library Association. In 1934 the Corporation of Trinity House gave the Society its large collection of petitions from the wives and children of distressed seamen, 1780-1854, and in 1935 Kathleen Blomfield organised the publication of the first edition of The Genealogist's Handbook. An important Silver Jubilee Exhibition was arranged for 1936 though, owing to the death of the King, it was delayed until 29 June-2 July 1937 and Queen Mary was unable to attend. An attractive Exhibition Catalogue, the cover designed by Claire G.M. Evans, and to which many experts contributed, listed some 273 exhibits and records and gave detailed explanations of their uses. One major section of exhibits was provided by The Eugenics Society.

The collection of parish register copies was always a priority for the Society and in 1924 it had published the first catalogue of the transcripts in its possession. In 1937 Kathleen Blomfield and Kendal Percy Smith revised this catalogue and two years later, with funds from the Pilgrim Trust, the Society published their National Index of Parish Register Copies listing 4,000 transcripts in other libraries. The balance of the funds were used in a vigorous campaign to microfilm parish registers under threat during the Second World War.

At the commencement of the war in 1939, Percival Boyd started compiling his 'unit sheets' on former inhabitants of London, writing 59,389 in the next fifteen years. The former judge Viscount Mersey was elected President in 1942 and helped to steer the Society through the difficult war years when the membership was less than a thousand. There was a considerable improvement in the 1950s. John Beach Whitmore's A Genealogical Guide (the second standard list of printed pedigrees) was published in 1953, and two years later Arthur Willis had produced the first of the modern guides to ancestry tracing, Genealogy for Beginners. The Society had taken a lease on a fine Victorian house (with the income from three flats above) at 37 Harrington Gardens, Kensington, in 1954, and on the death of Lord Mersey in 1956, Lord Mountbatten was elected President in 1957 and began to take an active interest in its affairs. George Sherwood, who was still tending the Document Collection, died in 1958, his wife continuing to do so for several further years.

Anthony Wagner's English Genealogy came out in 1960, when the membership had grown to 1,658, and a new era began with the fiftieth anniversary exhibition 'The Ancestry of the Common Man' in the panelled lounge in 1961. That year pressure was successfully brought to obtain the release of the 1861 Census Returns. A full-time Director of Research was appointed in 1962 when Mrs Cecil Mackay became the Society's Secretary, a post she held for fourteeen years. With John Sims as Librarian a more active programme of publications was commenced. In 1965 the first weekend course in genealogy was held under the sponsorship of the Society at Missenden Abbey in Buckinghamshire and in 1966 the Society began to publish a revision of the National Index of Parish Registers in many volumes, under the editorship of Donald Steel. Three years later the Society gave its active support to the foundation of the Association of Genealogists and Record Agents, and in 1975 joined the Federation of Family History Societies, it being one of the hosts of the 13th International Congress of Genealogical and Heraldic Sciences held in London the following year. The exhibition catalogue became a guide to the Society's library which as Using the Library of the Society of Genealogists subsequently went through many editions. Alex Haley's Roots was published that year. The character of the Society had rapidly changed and the great modern movement in 'grass roots' genealogy was well under way. Following an appeal in 1968 the freehold of the house at 37 Harrington Gardens was purchased.

The Society had organised the opposition to the proposed removal of the Registar General's records from London in 1974, and the committee then formed developed into an influential Record Users Group. Both were actively involved in the discussion leading up to the important Records and Registers Measure regarding parish documents which was passed by the Synod in 1978. In another important field the Society had in 1975 obtained the co-operation of the Church of England in providing notification of threatened churches and churchyards so that their inscriptions might be copied.

In 1975 the Society had also sponsored the first of the English Genealogical Congresses organised by Stella Colwell with a small committee of members and the first of a very successfulk series of bi-annual day conferences had also taken place in London. The first Congresses had been at St Catharine's College, Cambridge, and that in 1984 was at the University of York. The library and collections continued to grow, the foundation of local family history societies in the mid-1970s doing much to increase the rate of transcription of parish registers and monumental inscriptons. Part of the work of the Genealogical Society of Utah too became available in the form of the International Genealogical Index which was first acquired in 1977 and which attracted many new searchers to the rooms.

In the 1970s the Society had taken an active part in the lobbying leading to the Parochial Registers and Records Measure passed by the Synod in 1978 which drew on the network of record offices being established across the country and the Local Government (Records) Act 1962 which allowed local authority record offices to acquire and care for records of local significance. The Measure required each diocese of the Church of England to designate one or more record offices in which all non-current registers and record over 100 years old must be deposited as well as all registers in which the arliest entry was 150 years old. The Measure also specified the exact conditions in which undeposited registers were to be held and made them subject to five year ly inspections by inspectors appointed by the bishop. The deposited books of baptisms and burials had to be available for research within reasonable working hours.

On 27 June 1979 by Special Resolution at the AGM, the name of the Society was confirmed as 'Society of Genealogists'. In 1981 it organised the first of a series of lecture tours to America and the following year a quarterly newsletter Computers in Genealogy was first published, regular meetings of computer enthusiasts taking place.

Lord Mountbatten had resigned as President to become Patron in 1978, when H.R.H. Prince Michael of Kent was elected in his stead. The investment in Harrington Gardens had proved a valuable one and a long search for larger alternative premises was rewarded when that freehold was exchanged for 14 Charterhouse Buildings, a strong building which had formerly housed rolls of silk, to which the Society moved in July 1984. Here there was a further rapid expansion in the collections and membership. In 1986 the latter was about 8,500 and an average of a hundred persons was using the Society's rooms every day.

In 1984 the Fellows of the Society suggested that it would be appropriate to mark the 75th anniversary of the Society's foundation by petitioning for a Grant of Arms and a grant was eventually made by Letters Patent signed and sealed on 8 May 1986; Garter King of Arms, Sir Colin Cole (a Vice-President of the Society) presented the Letters Patent granting Armorial Bearings and a Badge to the Society on 26 June 1986. The preliminary sketches, the Patent, and the line drawings were executed by Henry Gray, one of the Herald Painters at the College of Arms and a member of the Society, a lion's share of the fees being provided by the Fellows.

The Society's 75th Anniversary Conference at Balliol, St John's and Trinity Colleges, Oxford, 6-14 September 1986, was organised by Stella Colwell and the committee which had organised the English Genealogical Congresses, chaired by Brian Fitzgerald-Moore. It was attended by approximately 400 delegates, many of whom were from overseas.

The Society's Director appointed in 1979 now in December 1998 (after a forty year involvement) gave a year's notice of his intention to resign and in September 1997 an advertisement appeared in the Genealogists' Magazine for someone who had 'a considerable experience with genealogical matters and working in a management role'. Two trustees applied for the position, which explained why discussion of a possible deputy to the Director, which would have eased the pressures on him and ensured some continuity, had not made any headway.

The person appointed as Director on 5 January 1998, Robert Ian Neilson Gordon (1952-2017), was a forceful solicitor and borough councilor at Watford who for ten years had been trying to enter national politics. At that time the Society's Standing Orders, authorised by the Executive Committee under the powers given by its articles of Association, related to almost every aspect of the Society's work and embodied years of practical experience, the checks and balances which they ensured proving most effective. Last revised in July 1991, the Orders were well known to the Society's staff and to the members of its various committees. These Orders could only be altered by resolution of the Executive Committee duly confirmed at its next meeting. The Members of the Executive Committee, as trustees of the charity, could not be paid for any of their services.

On 17 September 1996 it was announced that the Society would receive a grant of £152,000 from the Heritage Lottery Fund to cover 75% of the cost of computerising the Society's Library Catalogue and providing online public access. The work, which entailed the employment of three professional cataloguers, would take three years. Partnership funding was provided by volunteer members with similar skills equivalent to funding of about £36,000. The application for the grant and the subsequent work was organised by the Society's Librarian, Mrs Susan Gibbons, who reckoned that there had been about 27,000 visits to the Library by members and 4,000 by fee payers in 1995.

In 1996 the Society had been exploring ideas for a more active presence on the Internet and the possibility of making source material available there at variable rates for members and non-members [Annual Report, 1996, page 12]. In 1998 Peter Christian had developed a website for the Society so that it could be contacted via e-mail [Annual Report, 1998, page 3] and two electronic mailing lists were established by Geoffrey Stone. The bookshop went online in September 1998 and offered a secure credit card facility.

Gordon, commencing work as Director on 5 January 1998, was chosen in the belief that he would act in the Society's lobbying for access to records and their preservation but, as he later admitted, he had no experience or interest in those fields. Finding that the Society's need for larger premises, preferably in the same area of London, was unlikely to be fulfilled, he concentrated on 'streamlining' the Society's legal framework but effectively dismantling all the checks and balances then in place.

Now in the 'dot-com boom', Gordon embarked on a refurbishment of the building, claiming that the Society would soon have, from online marketing, 'More money than it knew what to do with'. On his advice the General Regulations of the Society were, at the Annual General Meeting, on 29 June 1999, substantially altered to give greater powers to the Executive Committee. On 21 December 1999 a new company "Society of Genealogists Enterprises Limited" was formed to deal with book and software publishing and archives activities [Company Number 03899591].

At that time the Society had a Development Fund of £330,786 [Annual Report, 1998, page 24] and the posibility of an upward expansion of the building was being considered, but in the autumn of 2000 extra space was rented at nearby 9 Dallington Street, EC1, for those of the Society's staff dealing with finance, membership and publishing. This would cost the Society £52,000 a year.

On 5 May 2000 an agreement was signed with Origins.net (which had been operating the Scots Origins service since early 1998), set to start on 1 September 2000, and which went live on 2 January 2001 as EnglishOrigins.net, hosting a large group of the Society's Major indexes. The income from Origins in 2001 was a remarkable £71,819 with expenses of only £72; in 2002 the income was £110,316 with expenditure of £23,775; and in 2003 the income was £43,020 with expenditure of £494. However, the contract had guaranteed a monthly income of £5,000 for the Society and a minimum income of £100,000 in 2002. A new agreement was reached at the end of 2002 of which no details were published. A considerable time had, of course, been given by staff and volunteers to digitising library material for inclusion on the site. The figures were considered 'far short of expectations' and certainly failed to compensate for the loss of investment income caused by the Refurbishment Project. The site's name was changed to British Origins.net in 2005 and it was absorbed into Findmypast on 16 March 2015.

In November 2000 a 'design and build' contract for Charterhouse Buildings had been agreed, the work on this 'Refurbishment Project' taking place until 6 March 2002 [described in 'New Developments at The Society of Genealogists' in Robert Blatchford, ed. The Genealogical Services Directory: The Family and Local History Handbook (2002) pages 111-12.

On 24 July 2000 a trustee who had for some years received regular payments as editor of the Society's magazine and knew that the stuation was irregular was obliged by the Charity Commission to retire as a trustee.

At the end of the year 2000 the Society's accounts showed a deficit of £169,000 with capital commitments of £28,544 for fixtures and fittings, and a further £309,4000 for the refurbishment then taking place [Annual Report, 2000, page 37]. The total cost of the refurbishment had been £504,475 of which £48,875 was spent in 2000 [AR 2000 page 29] and £455,600 in 2001 [AR 2001 page 29]. These spendings included an unprecedented bequest of 'more than £200,000' from Eileen Amy Brock, of Stapleford Tawney, Essex, who died 3 October 2000 (and is remembered for her donation of personal items to the Museum of Childhood in Bethnal Green), 'to be used for the copying of parish registers and monumental inscriptions and for the general purposes of the Society', and whose will had been proved on 27 November 2000, as well as an unrestricted bequest of 'about £25,000' under the will of Derek Milledge. of Bracknell, who died on 26 July 2000 and whose will was proved 13 November 2000 [AR 2000, page 10].

On 31 December 2000 Robert Gordon resigned as the Society's Company Secretary and Mrs June Marie Perrin, who had been working locally at the YMCA was appointed in his stead, though the members were not formally told of this until it was mentioned by the Chairman of the Executive Committee, at the AGM on 19 June 2001. Gordon had in fact been elected Leader of Hertfordshire County Council on 7 June 2001.

On 12 October 2001 the Society was obliged to agree a debenture of mortgage or charge with HSBC Bank plc securing all its money and liabilities whatever, whenever and howsoever incurred, then or in the future. Short particulars of this were posted that day at Companies House. The Annual Meeting on 19 June 2001 was highly critical of the actions of the Executive Committee. The Minutes of the Meeting, printed in the Genealogists' Magazine for September 2001, were also criticised and eventually replaced by a 'Fuller Account' made available in 2002. By the end of 2001 there was a bank overdraft of £62,979 which increased to £71,822 in 2002 and to £113,279 in 2003. Two members of the Executive Committee made interest free loans to the Society totaling £50,000 in 2001 and one continued his loan of £10,000 through 2002 and 2003 [Annual Reports].

On 13 April 2002 by Special Resolution passed at the Annual General Meeting of the Federation of Family History Societies. held at the University of Warwick, at Coventry, the Society's valued status as a Nominating Member with its right to nominate a member to the Federation's Executive Committee, held since 1974, was terminated. The Society withdrew from membership of the Federation on financial grounds in 2009. The company Society of Genealogists Enterprises Limited was not dissolved until 28 February 2023.

At the Annual General Meeting on 28 June 2005 the Society's Memorandum of Association and Articles of Association were both altered by Special Resolution, the Society's name now being altered to 'Society of Genealogists' and whereas previously the 'directors' of the Society had been (in company law) the Members of the Executive Committee, the latter now became the Trustees of the Society and the Board of Trustees became the governing body of the Society, they serving three-year terms with a maximum of two consecutive terms (their chairman being elected for two years instead of one); their number was now fixed as 12 instead of 16, and their quorum as six. The alterations also allowed for postal ballots, the provision of indemnity insurance for trustees, nominations for Fellowship now needed six (not four) signatees, and the quorum for AGMs now being increased from 12 to 30 members personally present.

At this AGM on 28 June 2005 it was announced that HRH Prince Michael of Kent (the Society's President) had been appointed the Society's new Patron and Patric Dickinson, Richmond Herald, was now elected President in his stead.

It was reported in Family Tree Magazine for June 2008 [vol.24, no. 8, page 7] that the Society had been awarded a grant of £60,000 to pay for an Open Access Community Officer over the next three years, to encourage more people to explore their family histories and take advantage of records in its library, a new officer helping to run talks and courses to help budding genealogists.

At the AGM on 30 June 2009 the Society's Articles of Association were altered so that the votes of members at AGMs might be exercisable in person or by postal ballot; also that the Board of Trustees should consist of not more than 12 persons (instead of sixteen) who had been members throughout the twelve months prior to their election.

At the AGM on 24 June 2014 the Society's Articles of Association were altered so that a member elected to the Board of Trustees did not need to have been a member prior to election to the Board.

In July 2018 the Society received a bequest of about £190,000, under the will of Talbot Kersey Green, of Wokingham (1934-2018), a Member who had supported several historical societies and was latterly the archivist of The Mills Archive Trust at Reading.

The Society's freehold land and building at 14 Charterhouse Buildings had in February 2019 been worth an estimated £6,000,000 and it was sold on 8 October 2020 for £6,300,000 [HM Land Registry, Property Register, 15 December 2024] but the registered estate being subject to the abovementioned Charge, created in 2001, the Society's net gain on the disposal was £3,265,334 [Annual Report, 2020, page 25; Genealogists' Magazine, December 2020, vol 33, page 253].

The Society was closed to visitors in July 2021 and moved to temporary offices at the Resource for London, Centre, Holloway Road, but in December 2023, it opened new premises, its "Research Hub", in Islington, at 40 Wharf Road, London N1 7GS.

The Society's Articles of Association were altered by Special Resolution of its AGM on 1 December 2021 and amended on 2 July 2022, an explanatory note being filed at Companies House on 8 July 2022.

== Facilities ==
The Society possesses the largest family history research library in the United Kingdom, accessible to all members without charge and available to be used by the general public on payment of a fee. Society holdings include thousands of parish register and nonconformist register copies on microfilm or microfiche or in manuscript, typescript or published form, along with tombstone inscriptions, will, marriage licence and census transcripts and indexes, trade and residential directories and poll books (lists of voters), family histories, biographical dictionaries, works on apprentices and occupations, the armed forces, school and university registers and histories, genealogical journals and many other related works. The library catalogue is available on the Society's web site.

In 2000, the Society made a number of its genealogical datasets available online on the commercial service British Origins, with some free access for Society members. This material is now hosted commercially by Findmypast with a separate free service to members run by the Society itself on its own web site using the Frontis Archive Publishing System.

== Activities ==
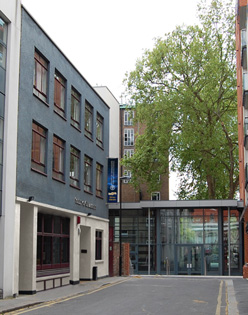
The previous home of the Society of Genealogists in Charterhouse Buildings off Goswell Road, London

The emphasis is on British, British Empire and Commonwealth sources, but the Society has some sources for most parts of the world.

The Society's Internet suite offers free access to major genealogical websites including Ancestry and Findmypast.

The society runs a programme of lectures, visits, and courses every year, and publishes textbooks, indexes, and a quarterly journal, Genealogists' Magazine. The latter is currently edited by Michael Gandy.

== Prince Michael of Kent Award ==
The society's patron is Prince Michael of Kent, after whom the Society has named a prestigious award (created in 2000), granted periodically to a person or organisation which has made an outstanding contribution to genealogy.

=== Recipients ===
Year	Recipient
2000	Family Records Centre
2004	ABM Publishing Ltd
2006	Genealogical Society of Utah
2007	FreeBMD
2011	Alex Graham, CEO Wall to Wall
2018	Cyndi Ingle, of Cyndi's List

Years not listed means no one was awarded.
