= George Sherwood (genealogist) =

English geneologist (1867-1958)

George Frederick Tudor Sherwood (22 December 1867 – 22 February 1958) was an English genealogist. He played a leading part in the foundation of the Society of Genealogists.
