= Thomas Ainscough =

English cricketer

Cricket information
- Batting: Left-handed

Career statistics
Competition	First-class
Matches	5
Runs scored	194
Batting average	24.25
100s/50s	0/2
Top score	61*
Catches/stumpings	3/–
- Source: CricketArchive, 9 September 2022

Thomas Ainscough (23 February 1865 – 20 November 1927) was an English first-class cricketer. He was born and died at Lancaster House, Parbold, Lancashire.

A left-handed batsman, he played for Lancashire County Cricket Club in two matches, one each in 1894 and 1906. He also played first-class cricket for Liverpool and District between 1891 and 1894. He scored two first-class half-centuries, with a best of 61 not out against Yorkshire.
