= Million Dollar Baby (album) =

Studio album by Pixey
- Released: 2 August 2024
- Recorded: 2023–2024
- Genre: Indie pop; synth-pop; alternative pop
- Length: 34:15
- Label: Chess Club
- Producer: Pixey; Richard Turvey; Will Bloomfield; Tom McFarland

Pixey chronology
Dreams, Pains & Paper Planes (2022)	Million Dollar Baby (2024)

Singles from Million Dollar Baby
- 1. "The Thrill of It" Released: 30 January 2024; 2. "Million Dollar Baby" Released: 30 April 2024; 3. "Bring Back the Beat" Released: 18 June 2024; 4. "Give a Little of Your Love" Released: 16 July 2024

Million Dollar Baby is the debut album by English singer-songwriter Pixey. The album was released on 2 August 2024 through Chess Club Records.

== Background and release ==
Million Dollar Baby was preceded by four singles. The lead single, "The Thrill of It", was released on 30 January 2024. The second single was the title track and premiered on BBC Radio 1 on 30 April. The third, "Bring Back the Beat" was released on 18 June, and was followed up on 16 July by "Give a Little of Your Love". The album was then released through Chess Club Records on 2 August. It is her debut full-length album; its predecessor, Dreams, Pains & Paper Planes, was promoted by Pixey as a "mini LP".

The "Dinked Edition" of the album, pressed on transparent red vinyl, includes a bonus 7-inch single featuring solo piano versions of two songs: "Million Dollar Baby" and "Oxygen".

Among the album's artistic influences, Pixey cites Swedish pop singer Robyn, indie groups TV Girl and the Go! Team, and Nigerian composer William Onyeabor.

Pixey released the singles "The Thrill of It", "Million Dollar Baby", "Bring Back the Beat" and "Give a Little of Your Love". She also released music videos for the first 3 singles.

== Critical reception ==
Professional ratings
Review scores
Source	Rating
The Line of Best Fit	8/10 stars
Dork	4/5 stars
Clash	8/10 stars
The Times	(positive)
The Telegraph	(positive)
Far Out	3.5/5 stars
DIY	3.5/5 stars
Financial Times	3/5 stars

The album was well received by critics, who praised Pixey's DIY approach and pop songwriting. It received glowing reviews from The Times, opining "pure sugar-rush pop perfection", and The Daily Telegraph, writing that "Pixey sets herself up as the heir to Charli XCX". Clash and The Line of Best Fit both awarded it 8/10, Kelly Scanlon for Far Out gave it 3.5/5 stars, and Arwa Haider of the Financial Times gave it 3/5 stars, observing "snappy hook(s)". DIY awarded the album 3.5/5 and complimented the album's stylistic range, noting 1980s synthesisers, psychedelic rock, Northern soul-inspired horns, and alt-pop.

== Track listing ==
All songs are written by Pixey, except where noted.

Million Dollar Baby track listing
No.	Title	Writer(s)	Length
1.	"Man Power"	Pixey; Richard Turvey	3:12
2.	"Million Dollar Baby"	Pixey; Dan Disgrace; Turvey	3:21
3.	"The Thrill of It"		3:16
4.	"Best Friend"		4:36
5.	"Damage"	Pixey; Edward Haslam	3:06
6.	"Give a Little of Your Love"		3:30
7.	"Love Like Heaven"		3:06
8.	"Bring Back the Beat"	Pixey; Turvey; Tom McFarland	3:14
9.	"Oxygen"	Pixey; Turvey	2:43
10.	"The War in My Mind"	Pixey; Turvey	4:18
Total length:			34:15

"Dinked Edition" bonus 7-inch single
No.	Title	Length
1.	"Million Dollar Baby (Piano Version)"	4:00
2.	"Oxygen (Piano Version)"	3:08
Total length:		7:08

- "Million Dollar Baby" interpolates "Commission" by Dan Disgrace.

== Personnel ==
=== Musicians ===
- Pixey – vocals, guitars, bass guitar, keyboards, drum programming, piano
- Tige Burns – additional bass guitar (track 5)
- Ed Haslam – drums (tracks 5, 7)
- Raymond Lester – violin, viola (track 10)

=== Technical ===
- Pixey – production
- Richard Turvey – co-production (tracks 1, 2, 7, 9, 10), additional production (tracks 4, 8)
- Tom McFarland – co-production (track 8)
- Will Bloomfield – additional production (track 7)
- Kevin Tuffy – mastering
- Jon Gilmore – mixing (tracks 2, 3, 9)
- Tucan – mixing (tracks 1, 4–8, 10)

=== Artwork ===
- Marieke Macklon – photography
- Cameron JL West – design

== Charts ==
Chart performance for Million Dollar Baby
Chart (2024)	Peak position
Scottish Albums (Official Charts)	54
UK Independent Albums (Official Charts)	5
