= Our Lady and All Saints Church, Parbold =

Coordinates: 53.5913°N 2.7639°W

Our Lady and All Saints Church
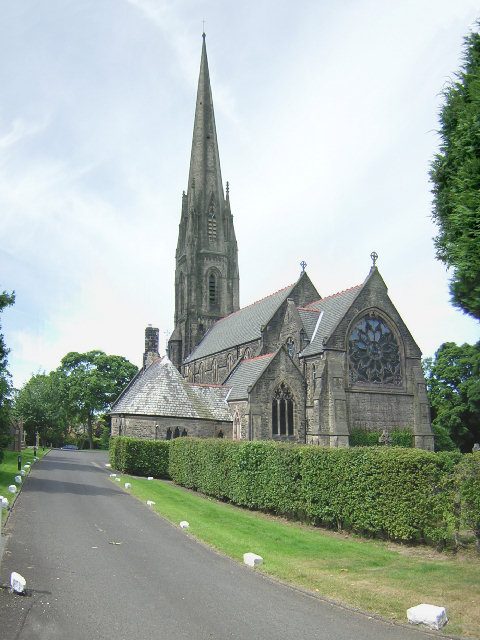
- Our Lady and All Saints Church
- OS grid reference: SD495107
- Location: Parbold
- Country: England
- Denomination: Roman Catholic
- Website: OurLadysParbold.org.uk

History
- Status: Active
- Founder: Ainscough family
- Dedication: Saint Mary, All Saints

Architecture
- Functional status: Parish church
- Heritage designation: Grade II listed
- Designated: 19 August 1988
- Architect: Edmund Kirby
- Style: Gothic Revival
- Groundbreaking: 1878
- Completed: 1884
- Construction cost: £12,000

Administration
- Province: Liverpool
- Archdiocese: Liverpool
- Deanery: West Lancashire
- Parish: Parbold

Our Lady and All Saints Church is a Catholic parish church in Parbold, Lancashire, UK. It was built from 1878 to 1884, and paid for by the Ainscough family. The architect was Edmund Kirby, who designed the church in the Gothic Revival style. According to Christopher Martin in his book A Glimpse of Heaven, the church is "a large and sophisticated exercise in Victorian Gothic which would more than hold its own in Manchester or Preston". It is located on Lancaster Lane in the village. It is a Grade II listed building.

== History ==
=== Origin ===
After the English Reformation, during the time of recusancy, and before the Roman Catholic Relief Act 1829, Catholics were recorded as living in Parbold. Saint John Rigby (1570–1600) came from nearby Wrightington. In 1804, the Anglican vicar in Douglas reported that there were "67 Papists" in the area and priests were residing in and celebrating Mass in "Wrightington Hall, Parbold Hall and Fairhurst Hall".

=== Construction ===
The Ainscough family resided in Lancaster House in Parbold. They had remained Catholics during the time of recusancy, suffering financially because it. However, at the time of the foundation of the church, Hugh Ainscough (1816–1894) and Richard Ainscough (1818–1877) had become successful businessmen, owning H&R Millers, which sold flour. They were the main benefactors of the church. In 1878, construction started. Land for the church was given by them from the estate of Lancaster House. The church was completed in 1884, and the total cost was £12,000. The architect was Edmund Kirby, who had trained under Edward Pugin and came from Liverpool. He also designed the reredos, which takes up the central eastern wall of the church. He was told by Hugh Ainscough to design a spire taller than the one on Christ Church in the same village. Benedictine monks from Ampleforth Abbey were invited to serve the parish. When the church was consecrated in 1884, twenty Benedictine monks were present to sing in the choir.

== Parish ==
After 1927, Lancaster House was leased and then given to the Sisters of Notre Dame de Namur, and became Notre Dame Convent. In 2021, they left and the building was sold. In 2019, the Benedictines returned to Ampleforth Abbey and handed over administration to the Archdiocese of Liverpool, who continue to serve the parish. The church has its own parish, it has not been merged with another. There is one school in the parish, Our Lady and All Saints Catholic Primary School in Parbold. The church has one Sunday Mass at 10:30 am.

== Exterior ==
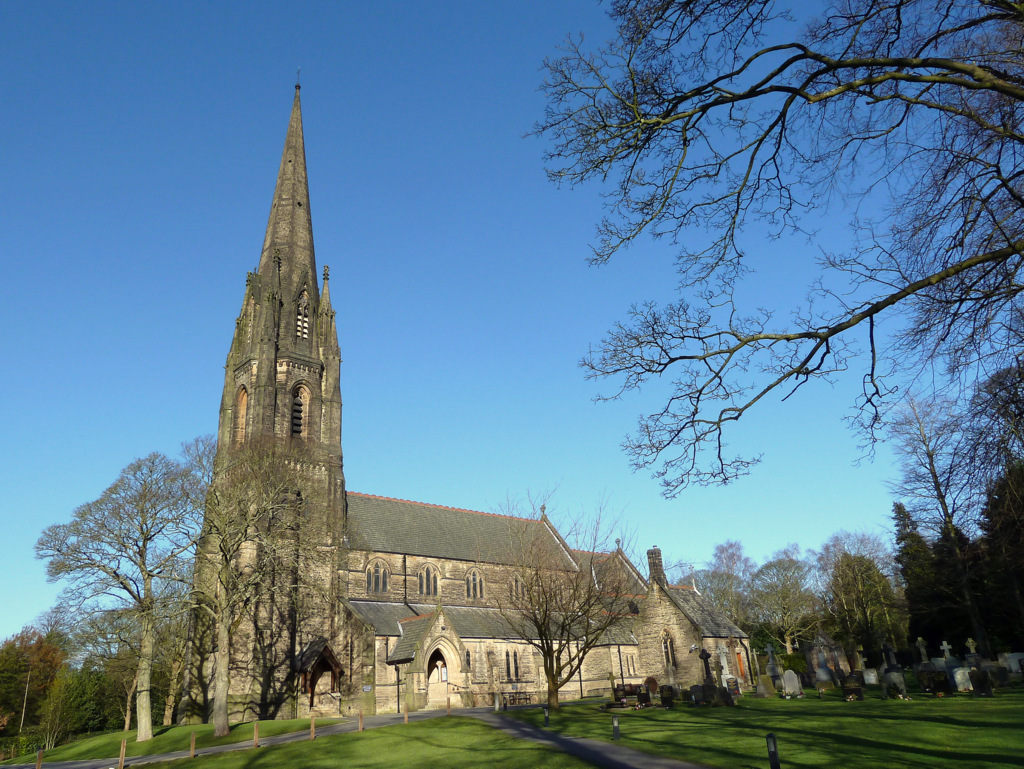
Side of church

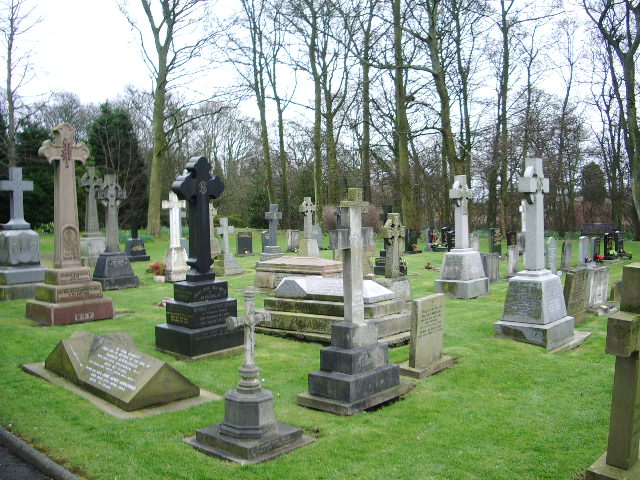
Graveyard

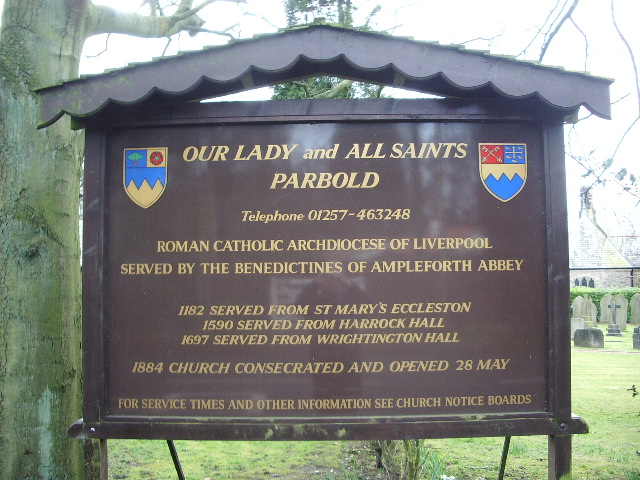
Parish sign

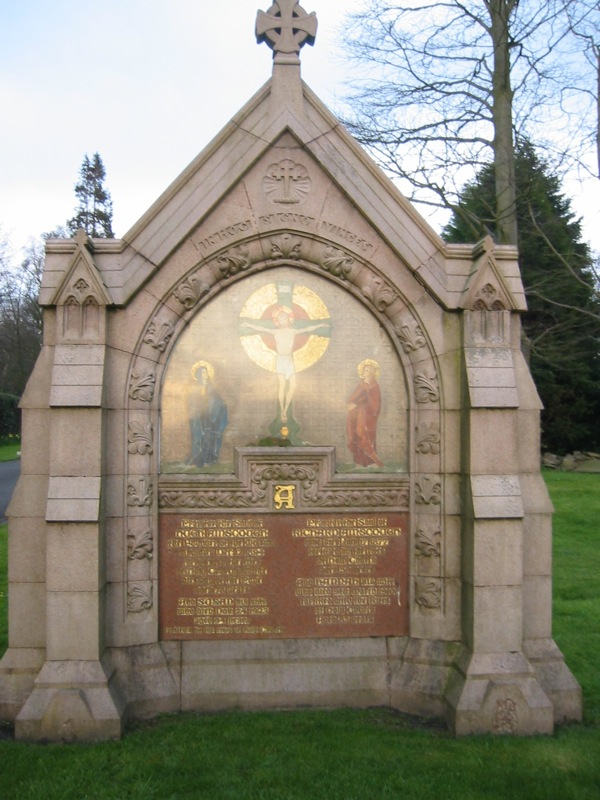
Memorial to Hugh and Richard Ainscough

== See also ==
- List of works by Edmund Kirby
