= R.B. Outhwaite =

R.B. (Brian) Outhwaite (1935–2005) was a social, legal and economic historian. For the last 31 years of his life, he was a member of Gonville and Caius College, Cambridge, where he was, latterly, Director of Studies.

== Publications ==
- Clandestine Marriage in England, 1500–1850
- Inflation in Tudor and Early Stuart England
- Dearth, Public Policy and Social Disturbance in England 1550–1800
- Scandal in the Church: Dr Edward Drax Free, 1764–1843
- The Rise and Fall of the English Ecclesiastical Courts, 1500–1860
