= Nonconformist register =

A Nonconformist register is broadly similar to a parish register, but deriving from a nonconformist church or chapel.

Nonconformist churches do not conform to the doctrines of the Church of England. In other words, these Protestant churches dissent from the established church. Examples include the Baptist, Methodist, Presbyterian, and Unitarian denominations, and the Quakers (formally, the Society of Friends).

Following the Marriage Act 1753, all English and Welsh marriages (except those of Quakers and Jews) had to take place in a Church of England parish church. However, any baptisms and burials (or equivalent ceremonies) from other denominations might take place within their own churches and chapels, and these were often recorded in their own nonconformist registers. Nevertheless, it is worth remembering that there was no legal obligation for them to record any such events. A significant number of early nonconformist chapels never maintained any such registers, or they maintained them only sporadically. In earlier centuries such omissions might sometimes be partly due to fear of persecution. Occasionally marriages in places of worship elsewhere might also be recorded (sometimes involving more than one ceremony), although such entries originally had no strict legal status.

Registers of baptisms, marriages and burials of many nonconformist churches were collected and validated by the British government in 1837. These may be viewed at the Public Record Office in series RG 4. This followed long pressure for such unofficial registers to be given a measure of legal recognition. It had already resulted in an earlier system of limited registration for dissenters being established at Dr Williams's Library in London. Some local chapels promptly abandoned keeping their own registers, at least for a while, after this date (which coincided with the start of civil registration in England and Wales). However a second tranche of nonconformist registers was transferred to London after 1857, following a further report by a government commission.

After the Marriage Act 1836 marriages could take place in many other licensed nonconformist chapels, provided that the local Superintendent Registrar was in attendance. Eventually the Marriage Act 1898 enabled some of these chapels to dispense with this requirement, provided that they designated an Appointed Person (usually the minister or priest), who would be responsible for maintaining an official marriage register.

Many nonconformist registers have now been deposited in approved repositories, such as the local county record office. However different churches operate different policies, and it will often be found that rates of creation and survival for such records are less good than for other types of parish register. A number of such registers have also started to appear online.
