= Parbold =

Village in Lancashire, England

Coordinates: 53.593°N 2.764°W

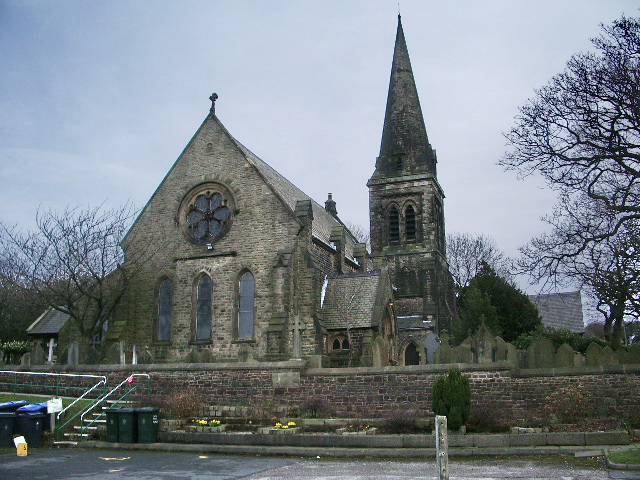
- Christ Church

- Location in West Lancashire Location within Lancashire
- Population: 2,582 (settlement) 3,784(ward) (2011 census)
- OS grid reference: SD495115
- Civil parish: Parbold
- District: West Lancashire
- Shire county: Lancashire
- Region: North West
- Country: England
- Sovereign state: United Kingdom
- Post town: WIGAN
- Postcode district: WN8
- Dialling code: 01257
- Police: Lancashire
- Fire: Lancashire
- Ambulance: North West
- UK Parliament: West Lancashire

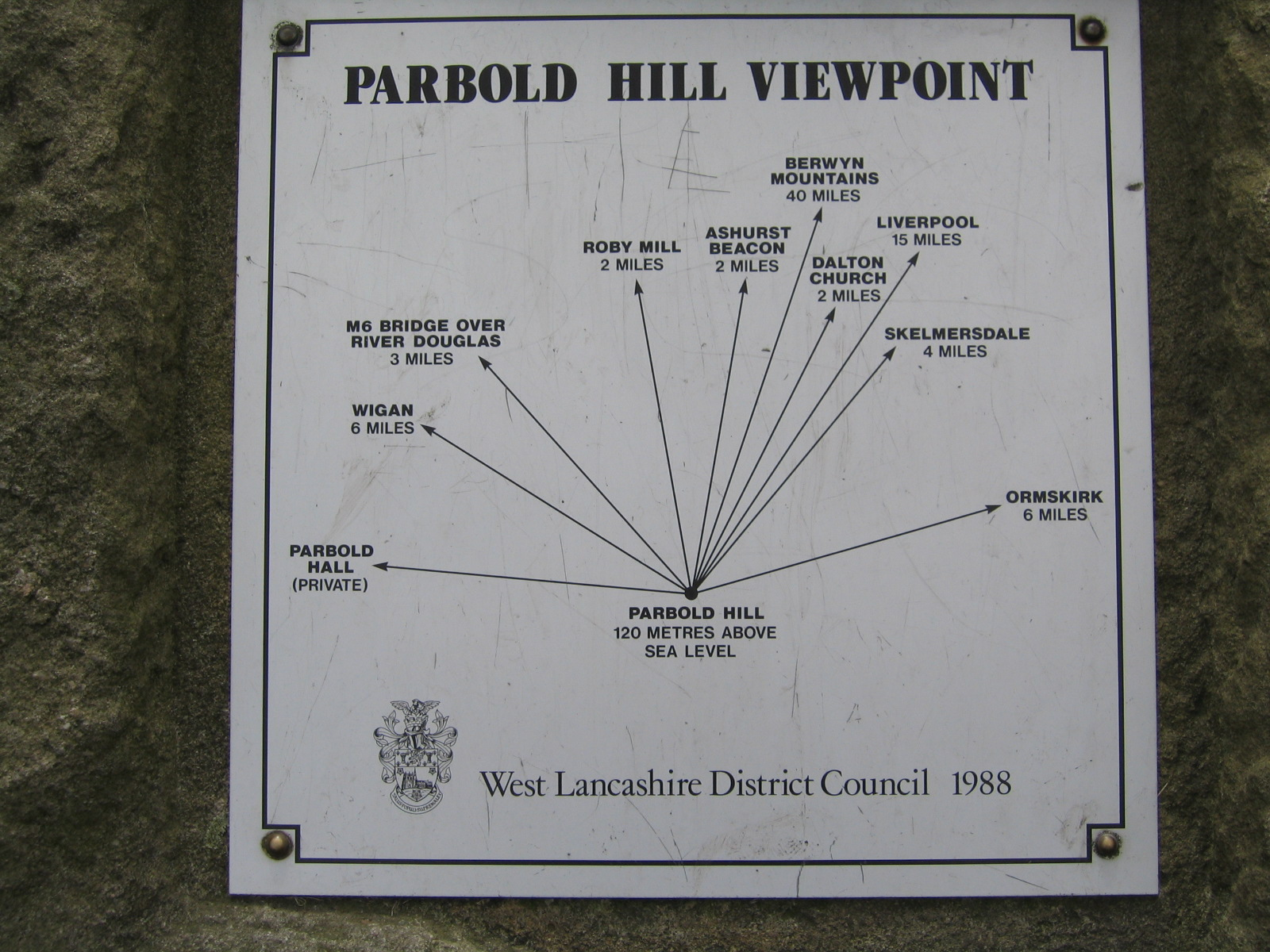
Sign at the top of Parbold Hill showing which landmarks can be seen in different directions

Parbold is a village and civil parish in West Lancashire, England.

== Local government ==
Parbold had a population of 2,582 at the 2011 Census.

West Lancashire is divided into 19 parish councils, the first tier of local government. Parbold is bordered by Hilldale to the north, Wrightington to the east, Dalton to the south and Newburgh to the west.

From 1894 to 1974 Parbold was part of the Wigan Rural District, along with Dalton, Haigh, Shevington, Worthington and Wrightington.

== Location ==
Parbold lies in the valley of the River Douglas, at the bottom of the western side of Parbold Hill. The village centre is about 3 mi (4.8 km) west of junction 27 of the M6 motorway on the A5209.

The village can also be reached by rail on the line from Manchester to Southport. Close to the village centre the Leeds and Liverpool Canal passes over the River Douglas. The nearest sizable towns are Skelmersdale (about 5 miles away), Ormskirk (7 miles), and Wigan (9 miles).

The village is dominated by Parbold Hill which rises to 400 feet above sea level, the top of which is approximately 1 mile to the east of the village. The top of the hill overlooks the West Lancashire plain and the North West of England across to Liverpool, Manchester and Wales. Wood Lane, just off the main road, is also known for its views of the surrounding countryside.

== History ==
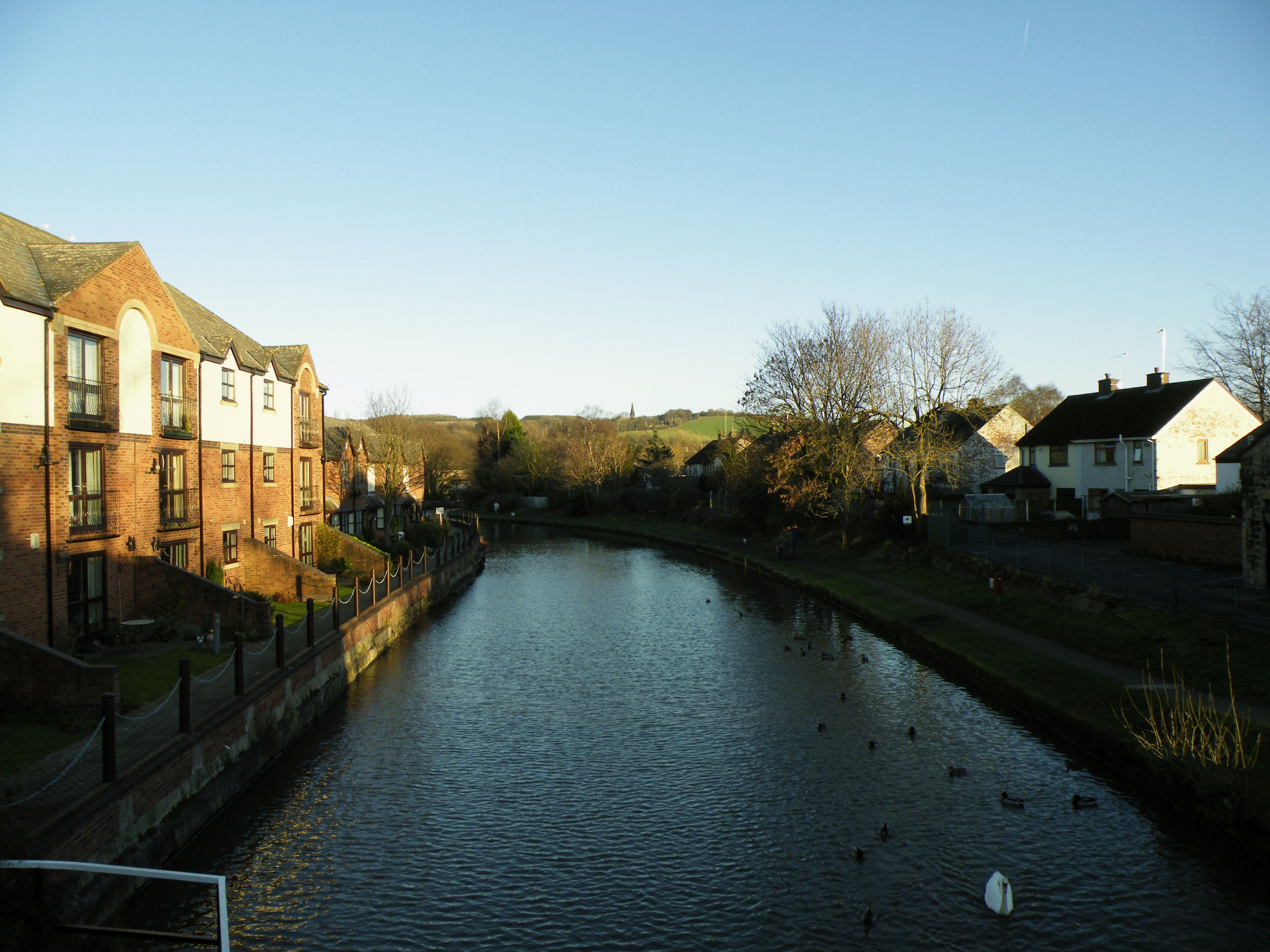
View of the Leeds and Liverpool Canal through the village. Parbold Hill can be seen in the background.

The earliest known reference to Parbold is in the late 12th century, where grants of land were made to nearby Burscough Priory (pronounced Bursk-owe). After the Norman Conquest, Parbold was part of the Barony of Manchester. Little development occurred from this time to the mid 18th century. Parbold became a civil parish in 1894.

During the 18th and 19th centuries, a number of coal mines worked nearby, rather meagre, seams; hard sandstone was also quarried. Both coal and sandstone could be exported over the waterways; boatbuilding was a minor economic activity in Parbold around this time.

Stone from the quarry was once widely used for local construction projects, including the building of Haigh Hall. During the late 20th century, the site underwent a period of landfilling. Today, the quarry stands empty, gradually reclaimed by surrounding woodland.

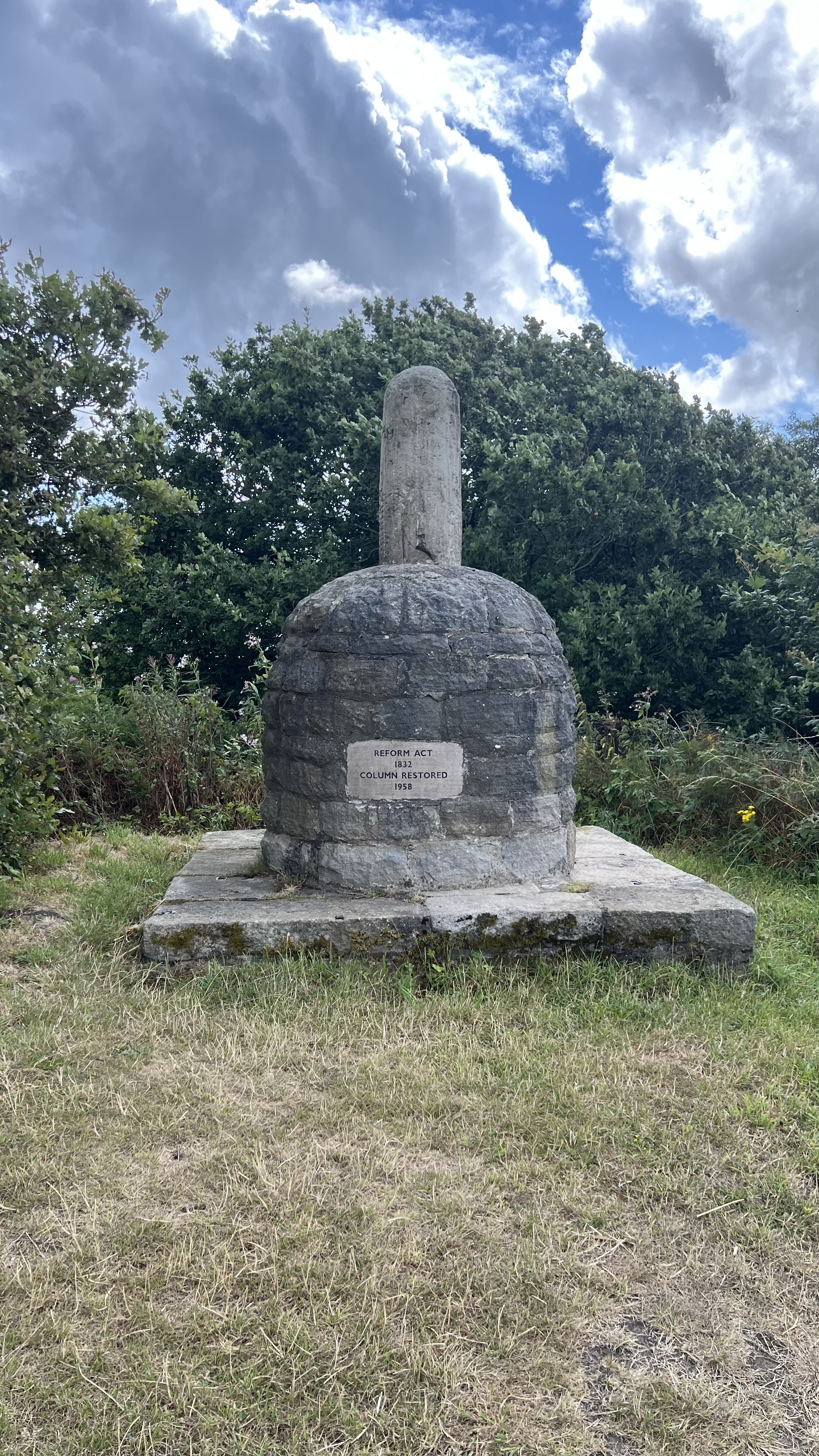
The Parbold Bottle Monument

On the slope of Parbold Hill stands the Parbold Bottle, a monument first known as the Reform Pillar, built in 1832 to commemorate the passing of the Great Reform Act. Originally positioned on a “large plinth” at the summit of Parbold Hill, it could once be seen for miles around. It later earned the nickname Parbold Bottle due to its resemblance to a Georgian port bottle. After falling into disrepair, the structure was rebuilt in 1958 through public subscription, this time lower down the hillside, where it remains today. The monument is still accessible via a gate along the main Parbold Hill road.

The old windmill that is located next to the canal replaced an earlier water cornmill which once stood on Alder Lane, and was in use until 1985.

Parbold railway station, built in the mid 19th century by the Lancashire and Yorkshire Railway, radically altered the village; it allowed middle class workers to live in Parbold and commute to urban areas throughout the north-west. In recent years a direct hourly service has operated to Manchester Airport railway station giving quick access (less than 1 hour and 15 minutes journey time) to flights from Manchester Airport. The railway station also provided a natural centre for the village which it still is today.

Parbold's war memorial is in the local Anglican church, Christ Church, near the top of Parbold Hill. The village's other church – Our Lady and All Saints – was consecrated by Bishop Robert Cornthwaite on 28 May 1884.

== Amenities ==
Parbold has two churches, two primary schools and a nursery, a library built in 1989, a purpose-built village hall which doubles as a cinema and community centre, a telephone exchange, a doctor's surgery, a sub post office and a number of other shops including a pharmacy, a newsagent, an estate agent, three hairdressers and both Chinese and Indian takeaways plus a greengrocery. There are two pubs along the main road through the centre of the village along with a steakhouse and a brew pub. The windmill in the village was built in 1794 but has not milled since about 1850 and is now a gallery for James Bartholomew.

== Events ==
Parbold Village Show is an annual community event held in the village of Parbold, Lancashire, England. The show is a traditional village fête featuring competitive exhibits, family entertainment, and live music, and is organised by local volunteers. It takes place on the second weekend of July and is open to residents and visitors from the surrounding area.

Parbold Village Show has its origins in local agricultural and horticultural exhibitions, reflecting the rural heritage of Parbold and the surrounding West Lancashire area. While the exact date of its founding is not formally recorded, the show has developed over time into a broader community celebration, incorporating crafts, photography, baking, and children’s activities alongside traditional produce competitions.

In recent years, the show has adopted annual themes that highlight aspects of local history and culture. One such theme focused on celebrating 250 years of the local canal network, acknowledging the historical importance of the Leeds and Liverpool Canal to the village’s development.

The show is organised and run by volunteers from the local community. Planning and delivery are supported by local groups, businesses, and sponsors. Proceeds from the event are reinvested into future shows or community initiatives.

== Sport ==
=== Football ===
Two semi-professional football clubs are based nearby: Skelmersdale United (Northern Premier League Division One North) and Burscough (Conference North). Shevington Sharks ARLFC youth teams train and play on the Alder Lane Playing Fields.

=== Running ===
An annual fell race is run over Parbold Hill.

=== Tour De France 2027 ===
In 2027, the 114th edition of the Tour de France will pass through Parbold.

== Notable people ==
- Margaret Swain (1909–2002), English embroidery and textile historian
- Hugh Wood (1932–2021), composer
- Justine Curran (born ca.1965), retired British police officer, brought up locally, was Chief Constable of Humberside Police 2013 to 2017
- Elizabeth Sinead Hillesdon (born 1995), known as Pixey, English singer-songwriter and multi-instrumentalist

== See also ==
- Listed buildings in Parbold
