= Cockburn (surname) =

Scottish surname

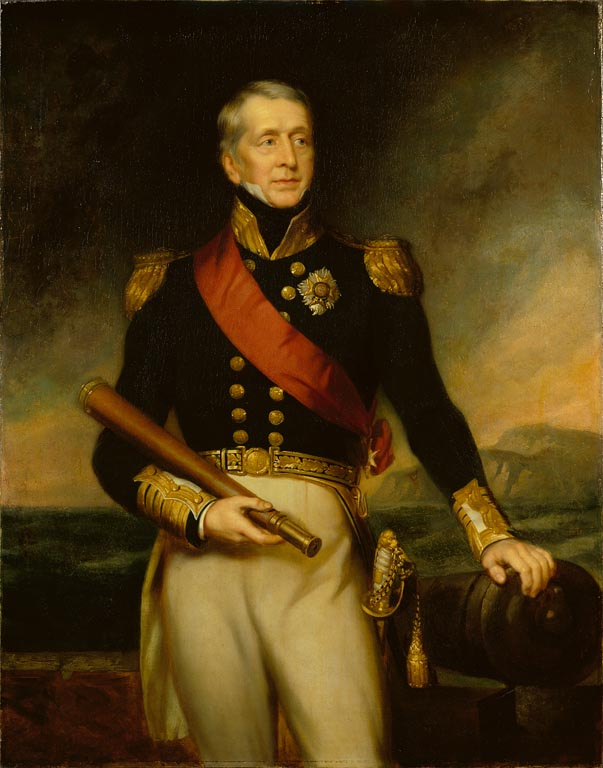
Admiral Sir George Cockburn, 10th Baronet, of the Royal Navy. He famously oversaw the destruction of newspaper offices and printing houses during the War of 1812 to ensure that "the rascals cannot any longer abuse my name."

Cockburn (/ˈkoʊbərn/ KOH-bərn, Scots: [ˈkobʌɾn]) is a Scottish surname that originated with Clan Cockburn, from region of the Scottish Lowlands. It is famously noted for its spelling which leads to the humorous, incorrect pronunciation of "Cock-burn" (/kɒkbərn/).

== Origins ==
The name is thought to have originated from the juxtaposition of cock, derived from the Old English word cocc meaning 'moor-cock', 'wild bird' or 'hill', with burn derived from the old word burna meaning 'brook' or 'stream'.

Other origins may include a possible geographical name including: a former Cokoueburn district in early medieval Roxburghshire; a place called Calkesburne that was mentioned in a charter from 1162 to 1190 that awarded the land of Hermanston in East Lothian; the hill called Cockburn Law, north of present-day Duns in Berwickshire, which was fortified in Iron Age times; and the town of Cockburnspath, originally known as Kolbrand's Path, on the eastern coast of Scotland. There are several Cockburn placenames that are located near Cockburn Law along Whiteadder Water including Cockburn farm, Cockburn Mill, and the now ruined farm Cockburn East.

== Alternative spellings ==
Historically there have been many alternative spellings of the family name. Early medieval spellings included Cokburne, Cokeburne, Kokeburne and other variations. In Scotland, the spelling of the family name had stabilized to Cockburn by the late 17th century, and this is the spelling most commonly used today in British Commonwealth countries. In the United States, most branches of the same family have adopted the simplified spelling Coburn; other branches have altered the name slightly to Cogburn. The French branch of the family uses the spelling de Cockborne, with the middle ck being pronounced.

In Cumberland, England, the Cockbain family emerged from Scottish Cockburn ancestors. A branch of the family was established in France in the 16th century by mercenary soldiers under the terms of the Auld Alliance. In 1494, a Thomas Cocquebourne was serving as an archer in the Garde Écossaise, which was the personal bodyguard of the King of France. Many more Cockburn mercenaries served the Kings of France in this elite unit over the next century. Another French branch of the family used the name Cokborgne and formed part of the nobility of Champagne.

The early-17th-century mercenary leader Samuel Cockburn used the spelling Cobron while working for the King of Sweden. In the late 17th century, a Cockburn merchant established a German branch of the family, which adopted the surname Kabrun in the Hanseatic port of Danzig. A great-grandson of this Scottish-German Kabrun was the wealthy merchant and renowned book collector, art collector and philanthropist Jacob Kabrun Jr. (1759–1814).

== Wordplay ==
The surname is noted for its humorous spelling, leading to it often being mispronounced as "cock burn", sometimes intentionally for humour. This has led to many people changing the spelling of their name to "Coburn" to ensure it is pronounced properly.

During the War of 1812 Admiral George Cockburn, after the burning of Washington, oversaw the destruction of the offices and printing houses of the National Intelligencer by his soldiers; he famously stated: "Be sure that all the C's are destroyed, so that the rascals cannot any longer abuse my name."

In 2004, a Scottish man named Craig Cockburn reported that he was unable to use his surname with Hotmail due to the slang word "cock" being part of his name. He had a similar issue in 2010, while registering on the BBC website, where again the first four characters of his surname caused a problem for the content filter.

== Notable people with the surname ==
Notable people with the surname Cockburn include:

- Adam Cockburn of Ormiston, Lord Ormiston (1656–1735), Scottish judge and Lord Justice Clerk
- Adam Cockburn (actor), Australian actor and DJ
- Alexander de Cokburne, Sir Alexander de Cokburne, Baron of Langton, Carriden, Bolton and Skirling, (c. 1310 – c. 1370), prominent landowner in the Scottish Lowlands
- Sir Alexander Cockburn, 12th Baronet (1802–1880), the 12th Baronet Cockburn of Langton and Lord Chief Justice
- Alexander Cockburn (1941–2012), Irish-American journalist
- Alison Cockburn (1712–1794), Scottish poet
- Alistair Cockburn, American computer scientist
- Andrew Cockburn (ornithologist), Australian ornithologist
- Andrew Cockburn (1947–), Irish-American journalist
- Archibald Cockburn (1738–1820), Scottish judge
- Bill Cockburn (1937–1995), English footballer
- Bronte Cockburn (born 1941), Australian basketball player
- Bruce Cockburn (1945–), Canadian singer-songwriter
- Catherine Trotter Cockburn (1679 – c. 1749), British writer
- Cherrie Ann Crichlow-Cockburn, Trinidad and Tobago politician
- Claud Cockburn (1904–1981), British journalist
- Claudia Cockburn (1933–1998), British activist for the disabled
- David Cockburn, Scottish coffee planter and District Collector in early 19th century Tamil Nadu, India
- David Cockburn (1941–), British philosopher
- Don Cockburn (1930–2017) Irish journalist, presenter and newsreader
- Sir Francis Cockburn (1780–1868), British officer and colonial administrator
- George Cockburne (died 1770), British captain and Comptroller of the Navy from 1756 to 1770
- Sir George Cockburn (1772–1853), the 10th Baronet Cockburn of Langton and British naval admiral
- George Bertram Cockburn, British chemist and pioneer aviator
- Hampden Cockburn (1867–1913), Canadian Army officer and recipient of the Victoria Cross
- Henry Cockburn (bishop) (died 1476), 15th century Scottish bishop
- Henry Thomas Cockburn (1779–1854), Scottish Whig, writer, lawyer, judge, Solicitor General for Scotland
- Henry Cockburn (consul) (1859–1927), British consul
- Henry Cockburn (footballer), English (soccer) footballer
- Hermione Cockburn, British presenter
- Jack Cockburn, Australian Rules footballer
- James Cockburn of Skirling, supporter of Mary, Queen of Scots
- James Cockburn (Royal Navy officer) (1817–1872), commanded ships during the Crimean War and then Commander-in-Chief, East Indies Station
- James Cockburn (politician, born 1819) (1819–1883), Canadian politician and a Father of the Canadian Confederation of 1867
- James Cockburn (minister) (1882–1973), Scottish scholar and Church of Scotland clergyman
- James Pattison Cockburn (1779–1847), British artillery officer and important painter of watercolors in Upper and Lower Canada
- John Cockburn of Ormiston, 16th-century Scottish landowner
- John Cockburn (Scottish officer) (c. 1620 – c. 1680), 17th-century Scottish Governor of Stirling Castle and Hume Castle
- John Cockburn (Scottish politician), John Cockburn of Ormiston (c. 1685 – 1758), Scottish politician, landowner and agricultural reformer
- John Cockburn (Australian politician) (1850–1929), Australian politician
- John Cockburn (test pilot) (1937–2017), British test pilot of English Electric "Lightning"
- Karen Cockburn (1980–), Canadian gymnast
- Kofi Cockburn (born 1999), Jamaican basketball player
- Leslie Cockburn (1952–), American writer and filmmaker
- Martin Cockburn (1731–1818), Jamaican-born American planter (Fairfax County, Virginia). Neighbor and close friend of George Mason.
- Ninian Cockburn (died 1579), 16th-century intriguer
- Olivia Wilde (born Olivia Cockburn in 1984), American actress
- Patrick Cockburn (1950–), Irish journalist
- Peter Cockburn, president of the Royal Philatelic Society London
- Richard Cockburn of Clerkington (c. 1565 – 1627), Keeper of the Privy Seal of Scotland
- Richard Cockburn Maclaurin, American educator and physicist
- Robert Cockburn (diplomat), Scottish bishop and diplomat during the Renaissance
- Robert Cockburn (wine merchant) (1781–1844), soldier, wine merchant and founder of Cockburn's Port House
- Robert Cockburn (physicist) (1909–1994), British physicist and key developer of electronic countermeasures during WWII
- Rodney Cockburn (1877–1932), author of a book on South Australian place names
- Sally Cockburn, Canadian-American mathematician
- Sarah Cockburn (1939–2000), barrister and writer who used the pseudonym Sarah Caudwell
- Samuel Cockburn (mercenary leader) (1574–1621), Scottish soldier who served in the Swedish army
- Samuel Cockburn (physician and homeopath) (1823–1915), outspoken Scottish advocate for homeopathy
- Stewart Cockburn (1921–2009), South Australian journalist and author, son of Rodney Cockburn
- William Cockburn (cavalry officer) (c. 1605 – 1683), Scottish Royalist cavalry officer who led operations against Covenanter leaders in Ayrshire and Galloway
- William Cockburn (physician) (1669–1739), Scottish physician who sold to the British Royal Navy a purported cure for dysentery

== See also ==
- Cockburn (disambiguation)
- Coburn (disambiguation)
