= William Cockburn =

William Cockburn may refer to:

- Sir William Cockburn, 1st Baronet (1627–1628), of the Cockburn baronets, and shire commissioner of Berwickshire
- Sir William Cockburn, 2nd Baronet (1628–1650), of the Cockburn baronets
- Sir William Cockburn, 3rd Baronet (1650–1657), of the Cockburn baronets
- William Cockburn (physician) (1669–1739), Scottish doctor
- William Cockburn (cavalry officer) (died 1683), Royalist Scottish cavalry officer who led operations against Covenanter leaders in Ayrshire and Galloway in the 1670s
- Sir William Cockburn, 11th Baronet (1773–1858), Dean of York
- William Cockburn (priest), an 18th-century Anglican priest who was Archdeacon of Ossory
- Sir William Cockburn (banker) (1891–1957), Scottish banker and cricketer, manager of the Chartered Bank 1940–55
- William Cockburn (footballer) (1889–?), English footballer
- William Cockburn (ice hockey) (1902–1975), Canadian ice hockey player
- William Cockburn (Australian cricketer) (1916–2004), Australian cricketer
- Bill Cockburn (1937–1995), English footballer

== See also ==
- Cockburn (surname)
- Clan Cockburn
