= Cobain (surname) =

Cobain is an Irish surname originating in County Tyrone, Ulster. The family descended from French Huguenots who arrived in Ireland in 1640, originally carrying the name De Gobienne. The Cobain family mostly settled in Aughnacloy, Ballygawley and Skey in Carnteel, before spreading out to Carrickmore around 1800. They have also spelled their name Cobane, Qubain, Cobaine, Cabane, Cabine, Qubein, Qubean and Cabeans.

Notable people with the surname include:

- Kurt Cobain (1967–1994), American musician, frontman of the grunge band Nirvana
  - Frances Bean Cobain (born 1992), Cobain's daughter with wife Courtney Love
- Arez Cobain (born 1988), American rapper
- Arthur Cobain (1880–1941), Australian rules footballer
- Fred Cobain (born 1946), Unionist politician from Northern Ireland
- Garry Cobain (born 1967), English electronic musician
- Ian Cobain (born 1960), British journalist
- Rod Cobain (born 1946), Australian rules footballer

Notable people with the nickname:

- Black Cobain (born 1986), stage name of American rapper Marcus Gloster
- Cash Cobain (born 1998), stage name of American rapper Cashmere Small

== See also ==
- "Clout Cobain", a 2018 song by American rapper Denzel Curry
- Edward de Cobain (1840–1908), Irish Conservative politician
- Cockbain, a surname for two Australian brothers
