= John Cockburn =

John Cockburn may refer to:

- John Cockburn of Ormiston (died 1583), supporter of the Scottish Reformation
- John Cockburn (died 1623), Scottish landowner and lawyer
- Colonel John Cockburn (c1620–c1680), 17th-century Scottish officer
- John Cockburn (theologian) (1652–1729)
- John Cockburn (Scottish politician) (died 1758)
- John Cockburn (Australian politician) (1850–1929)
- Jack Cockburn (1911–1990), Australian Rules footballer
- John Cockburn (test pilot) (1937–2017)

== See also ==
- John Coburn (disambiguation)
