= Michael Alford (athletic director) =

American college sports administrator

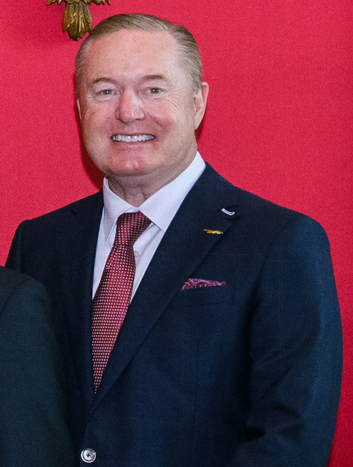
- Alford in 2026

Biographical details
- Born: 1969 (age 56–57)
- Education: UAB

Administrative career (AD unless noted)
- 2012–2017: Oklahoma (associate athletics director)
- 2017–2020: Central Michigan
- 2021–2026: Florida State

Michael Alford (born 1969) is the former athletic director for Florida State. Alford was previously the athletic director for Central Michigan.

== Education ==
Alford first attended Mississippi State University but then transferred to the University of Alabama at Birmingham. While at UAB, Alford received his bachelor's degree in communication. Later, Alford received his master's degree in athletic administration from the University of Arkansas.

== Athletic director ==
=== Central Michigan ===
Alford became the athletic director for Central Michigan University following marketing positions for Alabama, the Dallas Cowboys, and Oklahoma. While at Central Michigan, Alford hired eight head coaches for various departments and guided Central Michigan to a 600% revenue increase.

=== Florida State ===
After briefly serving as the CEO for Seminoles Boosters, Alford was named the athletic director for Florida State University. Alford replaced David Coburn who retired days earlier.

During his tenure, Alford hired head coaches including Luke Loucks (men's basketball), Link Jarrett (baseball), Brian Pensky (soccer), Brooke Wyckoff (women's basketball), and Sara Tisdale (lacrosse), along with overseeing the launch of a women's lacrosse program in 2025. He also led football facility projects costing more than $400 million, including a renovation of the west side of Doak Campbell Stadium and a football-only facility that opened in October 2025.

On September 14, 2026, Florida State fired Alford, effective immediately. University president Richard D. McCullough said the move was a "first step" toward building revenue and reviewing the administration the athletics department needs, and board of trustees chairman Peter Collins described it as the start of "the next phase of restructuring." Senior associate athletics director Bruce Warwick was named interim athletic director while the university conducted a national search.
