= Coburn (surname) =

Coburn is a surname, and may refer to:

- Abner Coburn, Governor of Maine from 1863 to 1865
- Alvin Langdon Coburn, American photographer
- Berthold C. Coburn (1899–1956), American politician
- Bob Coburn, host of the nationally syndicated radio program Rockline
- Braydon Coburn, Canadian hockey player
- Carroll L. Coburn, American farmer and politician
- Catherine Amanda Coburn (1839–1913), American journalist, newspaper editor
- Charles Coburn, American actor
- D. L. Coburn (1938–2025), American Pulitzer-winning dramatist
- David Coburn (athletic director), College athletic director
- Donald S. Coburn (1939–2024), politician and judge from New Jersey
- Dorothy Coburn (1905–1978), American actress
- Foster Dwight Coburn, Secretary of Agriculture, Kansas
- Frank P. Coburn (1858–1932), United States House of Representatives from Wisconsin
- George Coburn (1920–2009), Irish politician
- J. A. Coburn (1868–1943), American minstrel performer, troupe manager
- James Coburn, American film actor
- James Coburn (criminal), executed in 1964 in Alabama, United States
- Jo Coburn, BBC political correspondent
- John Coburn (disambiguation)
- Josh Coburn, English professional footballer
- Keondre Coburn (born 2000), American football player
- Louise Helen Coburn (1856–1949), American writer and co-founder of Sigma Kappa sorority from Maine
- Maria Coburn (born 2001), American diver
- Norman Coburn (born 1937), Australian actor
- Pamela Coburn (born 1959), American soprano
- Sara Coburn, BBC business correspondent
- Sarah Coburn (born 1977), American opera singer
- Stephen Coburn, United States Representative from Maine in the 19th century
- Thomas B. Coburn, American religious scholar and writer
- Tom Coburn (1948–2020), American medical doctor, United States Representative and later Senator from Oklahoma

== See also ==
- Cockburn (surname), with the same pronunciation
- Cobourn, similar spelled surname
- Colburn (surname), alternate branch of same family in the U.S.
- Coburn (disambiguation), other uses of the name Coburn
