= David Coburn =

David Coburn may refer to:

- David Coburn (actor) (born 1969), American actor, voice actor, and singer
- David Coburn (politician) (born 1959), British politician, and businessman
- David Coburn (athletic director), former American athletic director
