= William Schaw (physician) =

Scottish physician

- Born: 1714? Scotland
- Died: 1757
- Occupation: Physician

William Schaw (1714?–1757) was a Scottish physician.

== Biography ==
Schaw born in Scotland about 1714, was educated at Edinburgh, and graduated M.D. there, 27 June 1735, reading a thesis on diseases due to mental emotion. He was a friend of Jonathan Swift's physician, Dr. William Cockburn, to whom he dedicated ‘A Dissertation on the Stone in the Bladder,’ which was published during the discussions in the House of Commons on granting money for the purchase of a solvent for stone in the bladder. A second edition appeared in 1739. The dissertation states the method of formation of such stones, the qualities which a solvent must have, and shows that the proposed solvents probably do not possess these qualities. He became a licentiate of the College of Physicians of London, 23 March 1752, and was created M.D. at Cambridge by royal mandate in 1753. He was elected a fellow of the College of Physicians, 8 April 1754. His only other work was ‘A Scheme of Lectures on the Animal Œconomy,’ also published in London in 1739. He died in 1757.
