= Cogburn =

Cogburn is a surname. Notable people with the surname include:

- Cameron Cogburn (born 1986), American cyclist
- Max O. Cogburn Jr. (born 1951), American judge

Fictional characters:

- Rooster Cogburn (character)
- Rooster Cogburn (film)

== See also ==
- Coburn (surname)
