= Cobourn =

Cobourn is a surname. Notable people with the surname include:

- Frederick Lee Cobourn (1885–1962), American politician and judge from Maryland
- Harold E. Cobourn (died 1938), American politician from Maryland

== See also ==
- Coburn (surname)
