= Cobain (disambiguation) =

Kurt Cobain (1967–1994) was an American musician, best known as the frontman of the rock band Nirvana.

Cobain may also refer to:

- Cobain (film), a 2018 Dutch film directed by Nanouk Leopold
- Cobain (surname), a list of people with the surname
