= Jacob Kabrun Jr. =

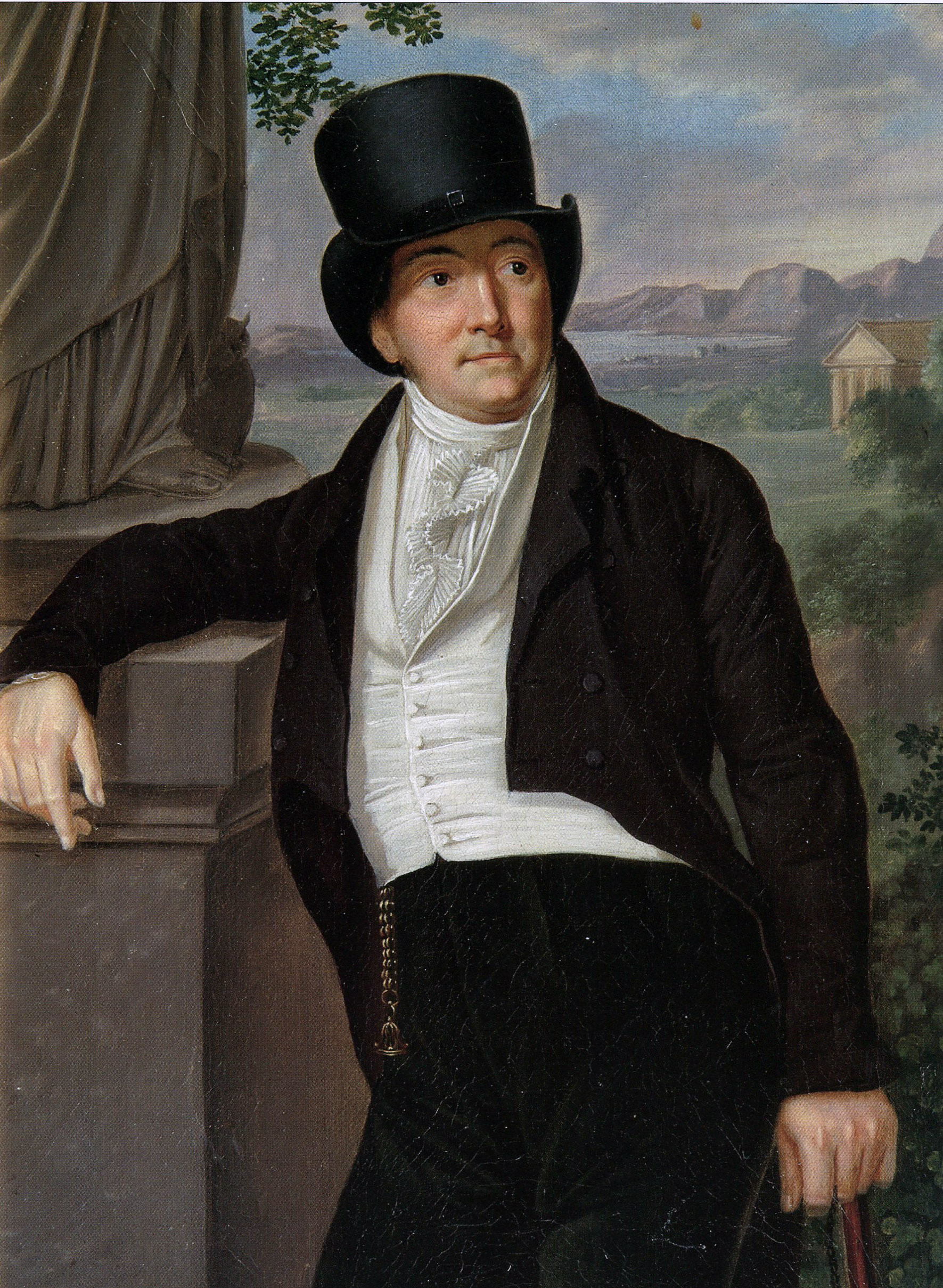
Jacob Kabrun Jr. (artist unknown)

Jacob Kabrun Jr. (9 January 1759, Danzig – 24 October 1814, Danzig) was a wealthy merchant, book and art collector, and philanthropist who lived in Danzig (present-day Gdańsk in Poland).

== Life ==
In the late 17th century, a Scottish merchant named Cockburn established a German branch of the family, which adopted the Germanized surname 'Kabrun', in the Hanseatic port of Danzig. Jacob Kabrun Jr. was the great-grandson of the Scottish founder of the successful Kabrun merchant trading house. From September to December 1804 the future philosopher Arthur Schopenhauer gained business experience working for Kabrun's firm. Kabrun was friends with Schopenhauer's father, a member of another Danzig merchant family.

Kabrun built up and maintained an extensive collection containing books and several thousand valuable drawings, paintings and prints. By the time that he bequeathed his collection to the city of Danzig it contained 339 oil paintings, 1950 watercolors and drawings, and 10883 engravings and woodcuts.

The surviving collection is now held in the National Museum, Gdańsk. Many works from the original collection were unfortunately looted or destroyed during the Second World War. The collection of Far Eastern art and the collection of antique coins had disappeared entirely by the end of the war. Kabrun also bequeathed 100000 florins to establish a Business Academy in Danzig.
