= Cockburn =

Cockburn (/ˈkoʊbərn/ KOH-bərn, Scots: [ˈkobʌɾn]) may refer to:

== People ==
- Clan Cockburn, Scottish lowlands clan
  - Cockburn (surname), a surname of Scottish origin

== Places ==
=== Australia ===
- City of Cockburn, Local Government Area of Western Australia, named after Admiral Sir George Cockburn
- Electoral district of Cockburn, seat in the Western Australian parliament
- Cockburn, South Australia, a locality on the NSW-SA state border
- Cockburn River, tributary of the Namoi River, NSW
- Cockburn Central, Western Australia, in the southern suburbs of Perth
- Cockburn Sound, an inlet in Western Australia

=== Canada ===
- Cockburn Island (Ontario), a 120-square-mile (310 km^{2}) island in Lake Huron
- Cape Cockburn (Nunavut), a cape at the southern end of Bathurst Island in Nunavut
- Cockburn River (Nunavut), a river in north-central Baffin Island in Nunavut

=== Caribbean ===
- Cockburn Gardens, a district in the eastern part of Kingston, Jamaica
- Cockburn Harbour, a settlement in the Turks and Caicos Islands
- Cockburn Town, the capital city of the Turks and Caicos Islands
- Cockburn Town, Bahamas on San Salvador Island in the Bahamas, named after Sir Francis Cockburn

=== Other places ===
- Cockburn Island (Antarctica)
- Cockburn Island (Polynesia), the name given by the British to Fangataufa atoll in French Polynesia
- Cockburn School, a secondary school in Leeds, West Yorkshire, England
- Cockburn Channel, a 64 km long sea channel in Tierra del Fuego

== Other uses ==
- Cockburn Collection, a collection of tartan patterns
- Cockburn's Port, a brand of port wine produced by Symington Family Estates

== See also ==
- Coburn (disambiguation), pronounced the same as Cockburn
