= Clan Cockburn =

Scottish lowlands clan

- Crest: A cock crowing Proper
- Motto: ACCENDIT CANTU [from Latin: "He rouses us with song"].

Profile
- Region: Scottish Borders
- Animal: Cockerel
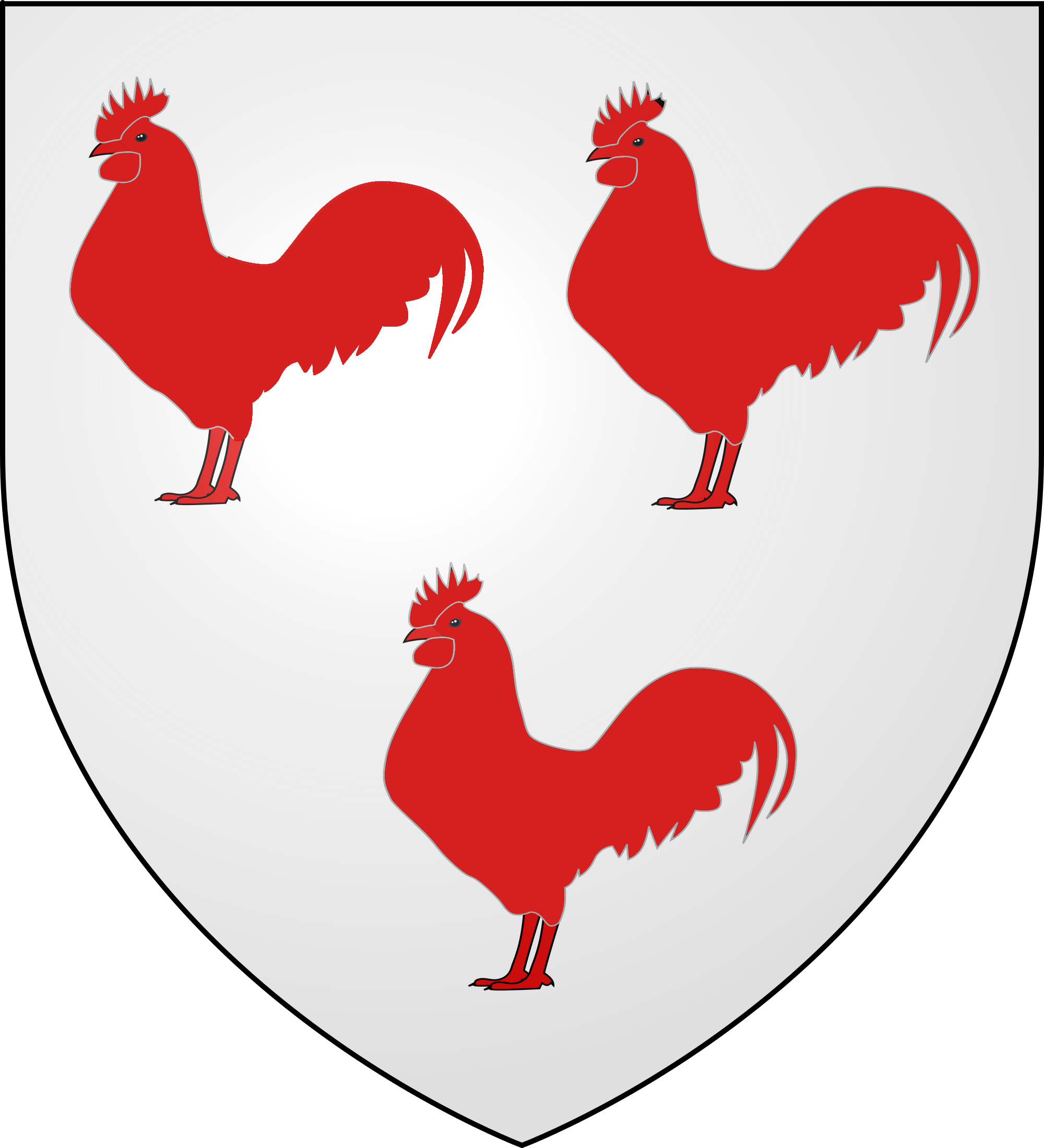
- Clan Cockburn no longer has a chief, and is an armigerous clan
- Seat: Langton
- Historic seat: Cockburn

Clan Cockburn (/ˈkoʊbərn/ KOH-bərn, Scots: [ˈkobʌɾn]) is a Scottish clan that originated in the Borders region of the Scottish Lowlands.

== Family origins ==
The Cockburn surname had appeared by the early 13th century when it was employed to identify individuals from a district or location called Cockburn (modern spelling). The name Cockburn has been viewed as originating from the juxtaposition of 'Cock', derived from the Old English word 'cocc' meaning 'moor-cock', 'wild bird' or 'hill', with 'burn' derived from the old word 'burna' meaning 'brook' or 'stream'. Other origins include a placename near the present-day Duns in Berwickshire, though this remains unclear.

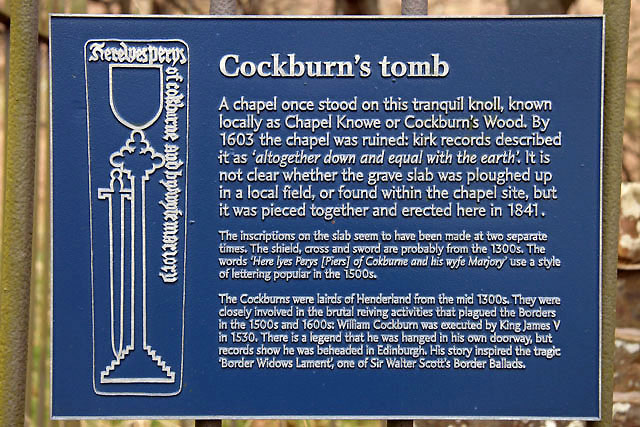
Modern-day plaque marking the tomb of Perys de Cokburne and his wife Marjory at the site of the now lost Chapel Knowe. The heavily weathered tomb is believed to date from the 14th or 15th centuries. A branch of the Cockburns were lairds of nearby Henderland in Selkirkshire starting in the mid-14th century.

In perhaps the first recorded mention of a Cockburn, a Petro de Cokburne witnessed a charter in the "Register of the House of Soltre" that described a gift of arable land in Lempitlaw, just east of Kelso in Roxburghshire in about 1190–1220, during the reign of King William "the Lion" (1165–1214). However, the dating of this document has been recently revised to 1251–1274. A Robert de Cockburn is mentioned as a ‘serviens’ (servant or sergeant) in a charter, dating from 1232 to 1242, in which land is granted to the Chapel of St. Nicholas, next to a bridge over the River Spey in Moray. The knight Sir Roberto de Cokeburn (perhaps the same Robert) is mentioned in a charter that was prepared in Chirnside on 4 November 1261 during the reign of Patrick III, Earl of Dunbar (1248–1270). Sir Roberto de Cokeburne is mentioned in another charter (dated to 1269–1289) as being the constable of the royal burgh of Roxburgh. A Petro de Kokeburne is mentioned on a document, dated from 15 May 1285, that records the sale of land to Kelso Abbey, near Roxburgh. In the mid 13th century, the landowner Johannes de Kocburn (John de Cockburn) granted land near his property at Collessie in Fife to Lindores Abbey. In the summer of 1296, along with the bulk of the Scottish nobility and senior clergy, Pieres de Cokeburn and Thomas de Cokeburn 'del counte de Rokesburgh' signed the Ragman Roll pledging their allegiance to King Edward I of England. However, it appears that at least one other Cockburn landowner incurred the disfavor of Longshanks at about this time. In a charter dated March 20, 1312, King Edward II restored to Nigel de Cockburn his former land in Megget (likely the same land, along the Megget Water now in Selkirkshire, that later became known as Henderland). This land had been awarded to another man by the previous English king because Nigel had been declared a rebel. Possibly Nigel de Cockburn had chosen to avoid signing the Ragman Roll back in 1296. Perhaps Edward II was attempting to secure new Scottish allies prior to his next invasion of Scotland because in the same charter the king restored land to eleven other former Scottish rebels.

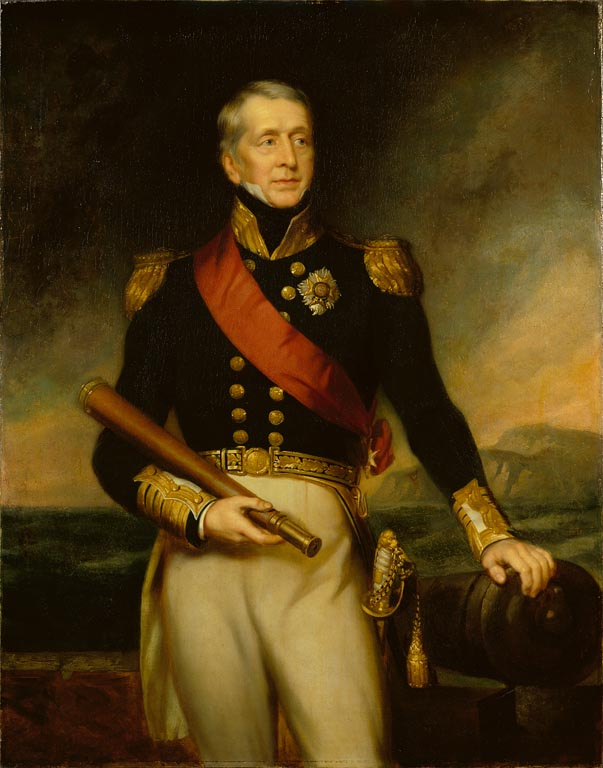
Admiral Sir George Cockburn, 10th Baronet Cockburn of Langton

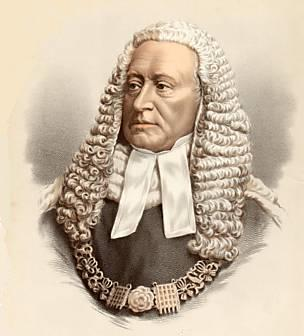
Sir Alexander Cockburn, Lord Chief Justice, 12th Baronet Cockburn of Langton

The Cockburn name was well known in the English possessions of the Caribbean from the 17th century onwards. By the early 18th century, Cockburns were living in the Bahamas, Barbados and Jamaica. Cockburn Town, the capital of the Turks and Caicos Islands, was founded in 1681 by salt traders from the Bahamas. Dr. James Cockburn (b. c. 1659 in Langton, Scotland – d. 1718 in Jamaica), Dr. Thomas Cockburn (1700-c. 1769) and Dr. James Cockburn (c. 1770-1798) were three generations of medical doctors from the same Cockburn family in Jamaica. The first doctor in this line was the third son of Sir Archibald Cockburn, 2nd Baronet of Langton. Admiral Sir George Cockburn led successful naval operations against the French and Spanish in the Caribbean during the Napoleonic Wars. Sir Francis Cockburn was a colonial administrator in both the British Honduras (1830–37) and the Bahamas (1837–4). Cockburn Town, the administrative center of San Salvador Island in the Bahamas, was named after Sir Francis. Some Scottish Cockburn men settled in the area and married Caribbean women, and their descendants live today in Trinidad and Tobago and elsewhere in the Caribbean and North America.

== The rise and fall of the Cockburn landowners ==
In 13th-century written charters, several Cockburns appear as landowners in Roxburghshire and Fifeshire. The land around Cockburn Law in Berwickshire was possibly the location of the residence of the 13th-century Pieres de Cokeburn; however, the nearby land may have been held by Cockburns as vassals of a more powerful land-owning family, such as the Dunbars. Cockburn Tower, a small fortified house (now a ruin) that occupied a site on the southern slope Cockburn Law overlooking the Whiteadder Water, was the seat of the Cockburns of that Ilk from about 1527 to 1696. The surrounding land was purchased in about 1527 by William Cockburn from Alexander Lindsay, 4th Earl of Crawford. The Tower and surrounding land were auctioned off in 1696 to pay off the debts of Sir James Cockburn of that Ilk.

In 1330, Sir Alexander de Cokburne became the Baron of Langton (in Berwickshire), Carriden (in West Lothian) and Bolton (in East Lothian) following his marriage to the wealthy Anglo-Norman heiress Mariota de Veteriponte (also known as Maria de Vipont). The Langton estate was located to the southwest of Duns, about 6 km from Cockburn Tower. Sir Alexander's second marriage to the heiress Maria de Monfode added the estate of Skirling (in Peeblesshire). The greatly enlarged Cockburn lands were split up among Sir Alexander's three sons; however, the barony of Langton and Carriden remained with the eldest son Alexander. For the next 400 years, the Cockburns of Langton were prominent landowners in Berwickshire. Other branches of the family acquired estates in Ormiston and Clerkington (just southwest of Haddington) in East Lothian. The Cockburns of Henderland held land in Megget then in southern Peeblesshire, while the Cockburns of Skirling held land in the western part of Peebleshire.

William Cockburn of Henderland was a notorious border reiver in early part of the 16th century. His well-known thievery and his purported close connections with his English counterparts just south of the border made him a target for the young King James V, who wished to clearly establish his authority over the more lawless parts of his kingdom. William Cockburn was arrested in 1530, taken to Edinburgh, tried, convicted of treason and beheaded. His lands and property were forfeited to the Crown. His son, also a William, succeeded in regaining his family's estate following an appeal in 1542 to the Regent, James, 2nd Earl of Arran. However, his great-great-grandson, Samuel Cockburn, found it necessary to sell the Henderland estate in 1634.

By the middle of the 18th century, as a result of financial difficulties, the Langton and Ormiston branches of the Cockburn family lost most of their land holdings. Sir Archibald Cockburn, 4th Baronet of Langton borrowed increasing sums of money, primarily from the Cockburn of Cockburn branch of the family, to help finance ambitious agricultural reforms on his Langton estate. These financial difficulties were not resolved by the three succeeding baronets of Langton. At time of the death of Sir Alexander Cockburn, 7th Baronet at Fontenoy in 1745, the financial situation of the Langton branch had become critical. In 1747, his heir, Sir James Cockburn, 8th Baronet, was unable to fend off the claims of his creditors, which included Sir James Cockburn, 3rd Baronet Cockburn of that Ilk, Thomas Hay, and others. The decision of the Lords of Session in Scotland in favor of the creditors was appealed to the House of Lords in London, but the earlier decision was upheld. The resulting bankruptcy led to the auctioning off of the Estate of Langton, which was purchased in 1757 by David Gavin. Despite the loss of their land, the Langton branch of the Cockburn family would continue to be prominent in Great Britain well into the 19th century, but now in the military and judicial arenas. The Cockburn of Langton baronetcy went dormant in 1880 when the 12th Baronet, Sir Alexander Cockburn, died without legitimate issue.

The Ormiston branch of the Cockburn family stems from the marriage in 1370 of John Cokburne, second son of Sir Alexander de Cokburne, to Johanetta de Lyndessay, an heiress who owned the estate of Ormiston in East Lothian. John Cockburn of Ormiston and his brother Ninian Cockburn were Protestant supporters of the Scottish Reformation and came to support the English cause in 1548 during the war of the Rough Wooing. John Cockburn of Ormiston was another enthusiastic proponent for the modernization of Scottish agricultural practice. The financial consequences of his plans were as ruinous to the Ormiston branch of the Cockburns as they were to the Langton branch. He attempted to demonstrate the benefits of his reforms in a model community at Ormiston. His ambitious schemes ran into financial difficulties and he was required to sell the estate of Ormiston in 1747 to John Hope, 2nd Earl of Hopetoun.

== Cockburn baronetcies ==
There have been two Cockburn Baronetcies in the Baronetage of Nova Scotia.

- The Cockburn baronets of Langton; it has been dormant since the death of Sir Alexander Cockburn, 12th Baronet, Lord Chief Justice.
- The Cockburn baronets of Cockburn, which is still extant.

== See also ==
- Cockburn (disambiguation)
  - Cockburn (surname), for a list of people with the surname, as well as history of the surname.
