= Coburn =

Coburn may refer to:

== Places ==
- Coburn, Pennsylvania, a census-designated place, United States
- Coburn, West Virginia, an unincorporated community, United States
- Coburn Mountain (Maine), United States
- Coburn Hill, Yellowstone County, Montana, United States
- Coburn, Western Australia, a heavy mineral sand deposit, Australia

== Other uses ==
- Coburn (surname)
- Coburn (band), an electronic music band from the United Kingdom
- Coburn Classical Institute, a former college preparatory school in Waterville, Maine
- O.W. Coburn School of Law

== See also ==
- Cockburn (disambiguation), with the same pronunciation
- Cobain (disambiguation)
