= John Cockburn (theologian) =

Scottish theologian (1652–1729)

John Cockburn (20 April 1652 – 20 November 1729) was a Scottish theologian.

== Early life ==
He was the son of John Cockburn, a gentleman of some estate in the north of Scotland, who married a sister of Patrick Scougal of Salton, afterwards bishop of Aberdeen. In 1666 he was entered at Edinburgh University, but was taken thence by his uncle the bishop, and entered in November 1668 at King's College, Aberdeen, as "Joh. Cobron, Edinb.", pursuing his studies under Scougall's eye, and graduating A.M. on 20 June 1671. In 1673 he became tutor to Lord Keith, son of George, Earl Marischal, and remained in this situation till 1675, when he was ordained by his uncle, who presented him on 14 February 1676 to the living of Udny, Aberdeenshire. He was instituted on 21 (or 31) May, but not without "great tumult", the laird of Udny claiming the right to present.

In the following August (before the 15th) his cousin Cockburn, laird of Langton, Berwickshire (a Presbyterian whom the bishop of Edinburgh had much difficulty in getting to present any "orderly person"), presented him to the living of Langton, but he did not accept. He was translated from Udny to Old Deer (a parish partly in Aberdeenshire, partly in Banffshire), between 10 August and 7 September 1681, on the presentation of George, earl Marischall. On 31 August the Test Act was passed, compelling the holders of all offices, civil and ecclesiastical, to swear adherence to the confession of faith of 1560, and to pledge themselves to support the existing government of church and state. Cockburn refused the test (of which his uncle the bishop was one of the strongest opponents), but early next year (1682) he complied with the act, being among the last of the clergy of Aberdeen diocese to do so. On 13 June 1683 he was translated to the living of Onniston, Haddingtonshire, of which Sir A. Cockburn was patron. This living had been vacant since the deprivation of John Sinclair in December 1682 for refusing the test.

During his occupancy Cockburn, though assiduous in the duties of his charge, got into many difficulties. He was obnoxious to the Presbyterians, and could not until 25 November get any of his parishioners to act as elders and "keep session with him". Robert Wodrow states that the Scottish bishops issued blank warrants to their clergy for the appointment of elders, leaving them to fill in the names of men who, it was known, would not serve, for the purpose of mulcting them in the courts. As a specimen he prints a warrant from John Paterson, bishop of Edinburgh, to Cockburn, dated 20 May 1685, which had never been filled up. Cockburn's first literary enterprise was a spirited project of a monthly magazine of literature; but the first number (for January 1688) contained passages unpalatable to members of the Catholic Church, which was now tolerated by the king's proclamation, and the publication was stopped.

== Deprivation and service abroad ==
After the Glorious Revolution, Cockburn was not prepared to transfer his allegiance to William of Orange. In August 1689 he was "cited before the privie council at the desyre of some within the paroch, to witt, Alexander Wight and Alexander Ramsay, for not reading the proclamation which forfaulted King James". This he should have done on 21 April. The privy council deprived him on 29 August, and he lay in prison "upwards of half a year". On his release he bade farewell to his native land; indeed, he is said to have been banished, and went to London, which he was obliged to leave "for writing of pamphlets". He crossed to France and attended the court of King James at St. Germain; but here he was importuned to change his religion, and declining to do so was sent off as a dangerous man. From France he proceeded to Rotterdam, where, according to the account of his representatives, he "set on foot" the English episcopal church.

It is possible that Cockburn started the movement for erecting St. Mary's English church (of which the records date from 1699). He seems to have been in London in 1697, and had by this time earned the degree of D.D.; he returned to Rotterdam early in 1698. From Rotterdam he removed to Amsterdam, where he was appointed by Henry Compton, bishop of London, English episcopal chaplain in 1698 (after April). In 1708 he obtained from the burgomasters for the English chaplain the privilege of celebrating marriages according to the English form. He left Amsterdam in 1709, and during the next five years he was probably in London. The account of his representatives is that "upon the troubles of those times ceasing by the revolution taking place" he had been presented to two livings in Somersetshire. But it must have been after swearing allegiance to Anne that he obtained these preferments. As he was "preparing to take up his residence at one of them", the vicarage of Northolt, Middlesex (then called Northall), fell vacant, and at the instance of Queen Anne, John Robinson, bishop of London, the patron, presented Cockburn, somewhat unwillingly, on 8 June 1714.

== Last years ==
Anne designed him as one of the bishops for the American colonies, had the scheme of an episcopate for America been carried out. As a parish clergyman Cockburn was businesslike and diligent, compiling in a register (begun 22 April 1715) a very exact account of the state and history of the parish; and providing during his life for the education of ten boys and six girls of his parishioners. His efforts were not seconded as he expected. He died on 20 November 1729, and was buried in the chancel of St. Mary's, Northolt. He married first, on 15 November 1677, a daughter of Alexander Gairden or Garden, minister of Forgue, and sister of James Garden, D.D., professor of divinity, and of George Garden, D.D., minister at Aberdeen, and had by her nine children, of whom Patrick was the eldest (a daughter Marie was baptised on 3 December 1681 at Old Deer); secondly, during his residence abroad, he married a daughter of Sir J. Littlepage of Buckinghamshire, and had by her also nine children (a daughter Esther was buried on 14 March 1728 at Northolt).

== Works ==
- Jacob's Vow (Edinburgh, 1686).
- Bibliotheca Universalis, or an Historical Accompt of Books and Transactions of the Learned World begun Anno Dom. M.D.C.LXXXVIII. (Edinburgh, 1688).
- Eight Sermons (Edinburgh, 1691).
- An Enquiry into the Nature, Necessity, and Evidence of Christian Faith pt. i. (1696); pt. ii. (1697); 2nd ed., both parts, (1699).
- Fifteen Sermons (1697).
- Bourignianism detected . . . Narrative I (1698).
- Bourignianism detected . . . Narrative II (1698).
- A Letter ... giving an Account, why the other Narratives ... are not yet published (1698).
- Right Notions of God and Religion (1708).
- The Dignity and Duty of a Married State (1708), 8vo; 2nd edit. n. d. (sermon at Amsterdam from Heb. xiii. 4, on occasion of the first marriage celebrated in the English form).
- A Discourse of Self-murder (1716).
- Answers to Queries concerning some important points of Religion (1717).
- A ... Review of the Bishop of Bangor's Sermon (1718).
- An History and Examination of Duels (1720).
- A Specimen of some free and impartial Remarks on publick Affairs and particular Persons, especially relating to Scotland, occasioned by Dr. Burnet's "History of his own Times" [1724].
- A Defence of Dr. Cockburn against ... A Vindication of the late Bishop Burnet (1724).
