= Langton Castle =

Castle in Scottish Borders, Scotland

Coordinates: 55.7660°N 2.3823°W

Langton Castle is a now destroyed medieval fortress at Langton, near the burgh of Duns, Berwickshire, Scotland. Little remains of the structure.

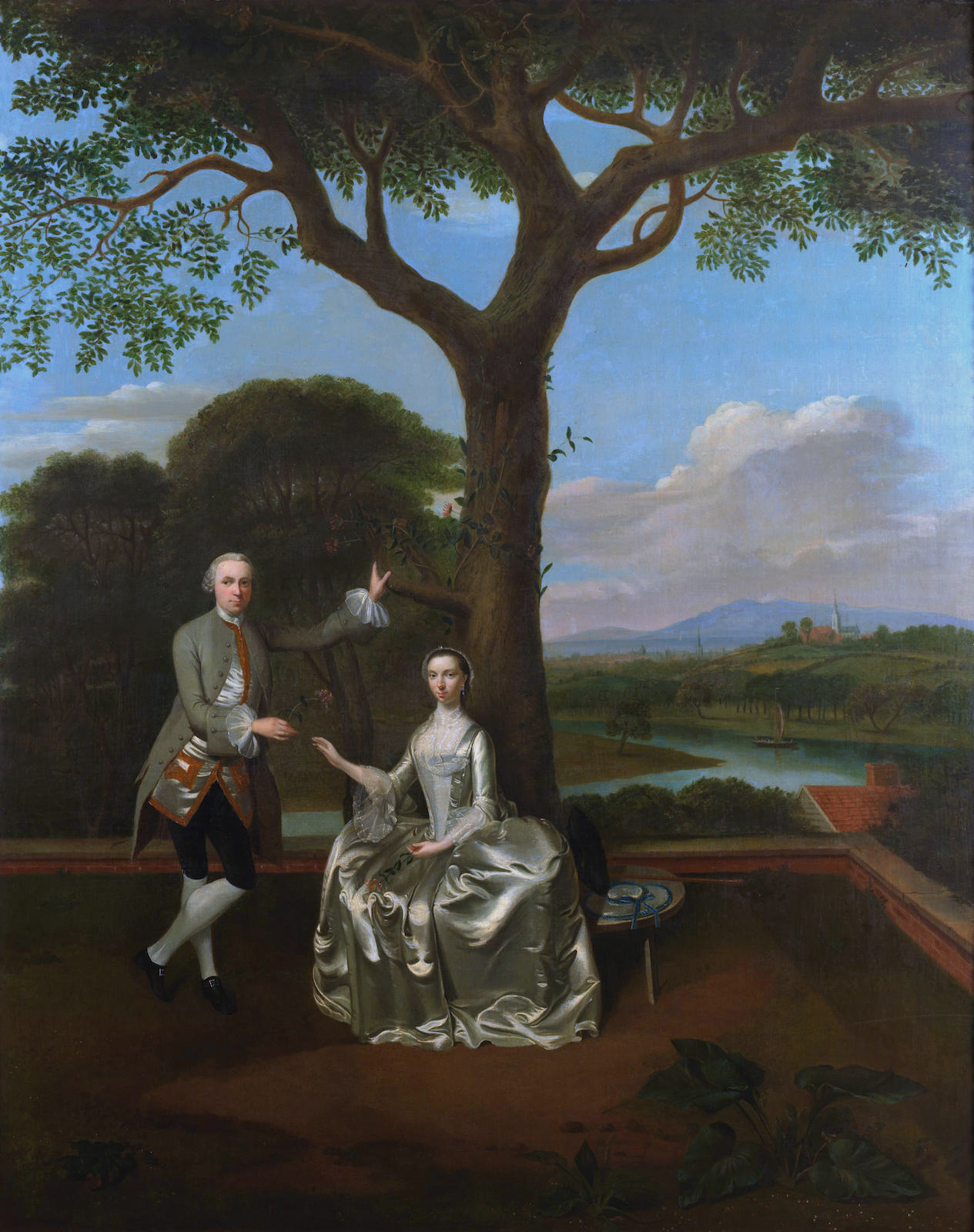
David Gavin of Gavinton and his first wife, Christine (Edward Haytley)

== History ==
Originally belonging to the Viponts, the castle and its estate passed to the Clan Cockburn in 1330 upon the marriage of Sir Alexander de Cokburne and the heiress Maria de Vipont. The castle was then the caput of the Cockburns of Langton until 1745.

From 1389 to 1396, Sir Alexander Cockburn of Langton was the Keeper of the Great Seal of Scotland.

In a dispute over succession to the estate, the castle was besieged by William Cockburn and his brother in law, David Home of Wedderburn in 1517. Antoine d'Arces, Sieur de la Bastie, the French deputy for Regent Albany, summoned Cockburn and Home to resolve the dispute. They in turn broke off the siege and ambushed Bastie near Preston, there they slew him and displayed his head at the Mercat cross of Duns.

Mary, Queen of Scots visited the castle in 1566. In 1745, Cockburn of Langton was killed at the Battle of Fontenoy and the estate was bought by a Mr David Gavin in 1758, whereafter the castle and the village of Langton were demolished to make way for a new mansion house. The villagers of Langton were relocated to the new village of Gavinton. Gavin married Lady Elizabeth Maitland, daughter of James Maitland, 7th Earl of Lauderdale, their daughter Mary married John Campbell, 1st Marquess of Breadalbane whose descendant demolished the house and built a final Langton House in 1886 designed by David Bryce. This last house was demolished in 1950 and only a decorative gateway remains.
