= John Coburn =

John Coburn may refer to:

- John Coburn (silversmith) (1724–1803), silversmith in Boston, Massachusetts
- John Coburn (Kentucky judge) (1762–1823), Kentucky pioneer, circuit court judge, and territory judge
- John P. Coburn (1811–1873), Boston African-American abolitionist
- John Coburn (Indiana politician) (1825–1908), American Civil War general, congressman, and judge
- John Bowen Coburn (1914–2009), bishop of the Episcopal Diocese of Massachusetts
- John Coburn (painter) (1925–2006), Australian painter
- John G. Coburn (born 1941), U.S. Army general

== See also ==
- John Cockburn (disambiguation)
