= Margaret Bushby Lascelles Cockburn =

British-Indian ornithologist and artist (1829–1928)

Margaret Cockburn
- Born: Margaret Bushby Lascelles Cockburn; 2 July 1829; Salem, Madras Presidency, British India (now in Tamil Nadu, India)
- Died: 26 March 1928 (aged 98)
- Resting place: Kotagiri, Nilgiris District, Tamil Nadu, India

Margaret Bushby Lascelles Cockburn (2 July 1829 – 26 March 1928) was an artist and amateur ornithologist who lived in the Nilgiris in Tamil Nadu, India.

== Early life ==
She was born in Salem (then in Madras Presidency, British India) to M. D. Cockburn, who at that time was the Collector of Salem district. The family initially visited Kotagiri in summer but settled permanently around 1855 at "Hope Park".

== Career ==
Cockburn experimented on tea planting at Alports Estate and made numerous observations on local natural history and many of these were reported in the works of Allan Octavian Hume. She also made paintings of local birds and flora. The Natural History Museum, London, produced a diary in 2002 with illustrations made by her of the fauna and flora of the Kotagiri region. A collection of butterflies was also bequeathed to the Natural History Museum.

She set up the first school for Badagas and contributed towards the construction of a church at Kotagiri in 1867 which was later taken over by the Basel Mission.

== Death ==
She died on 26 March 1929.

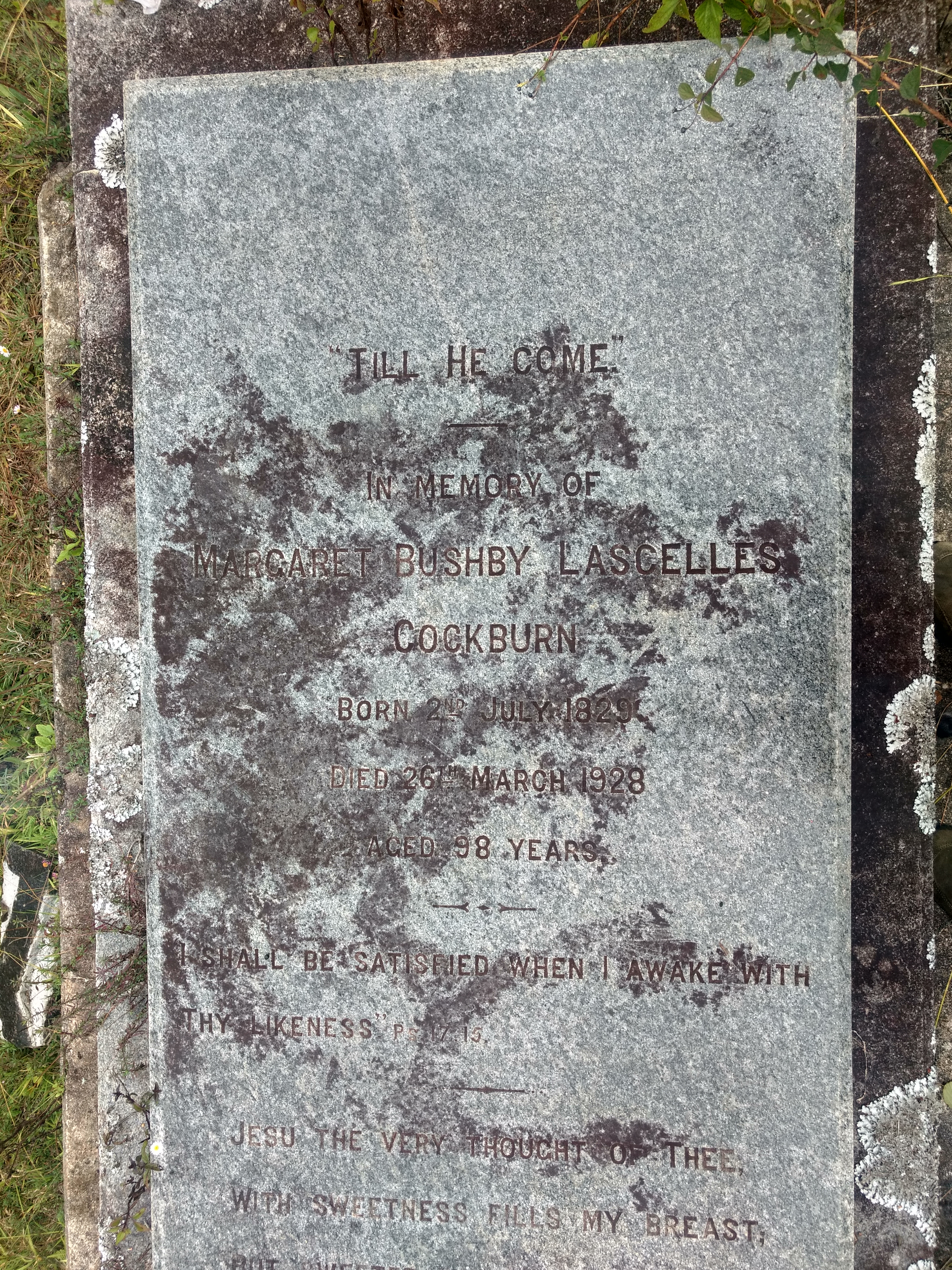
Margaret Bushby Lascelles Cockburn's grave at Kotagiri, India

== Legacy ==
A subspecies of Anthus similis from the Nilgiri region was named after her, but this is no longer considered valid.

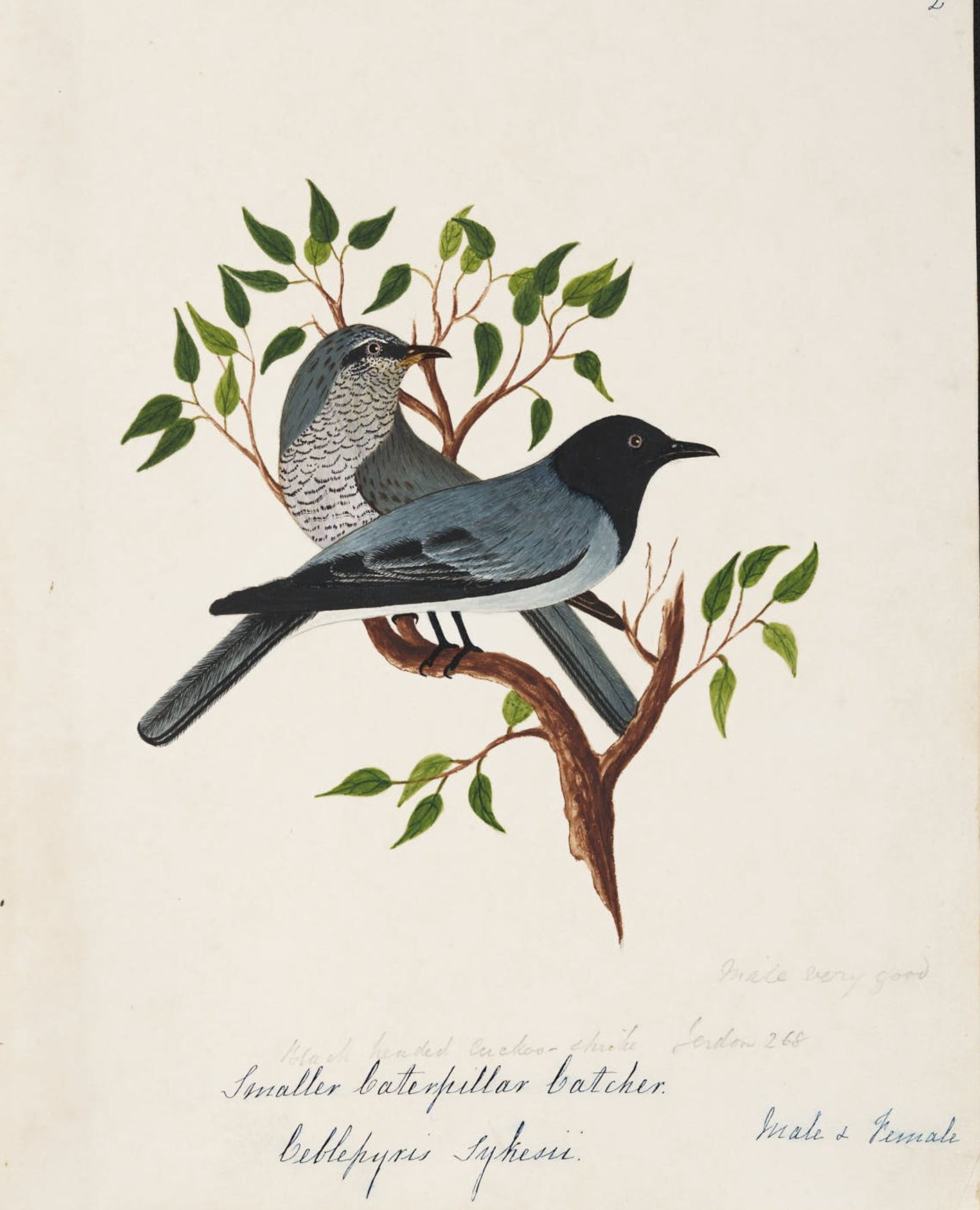
Lalage melanoptera

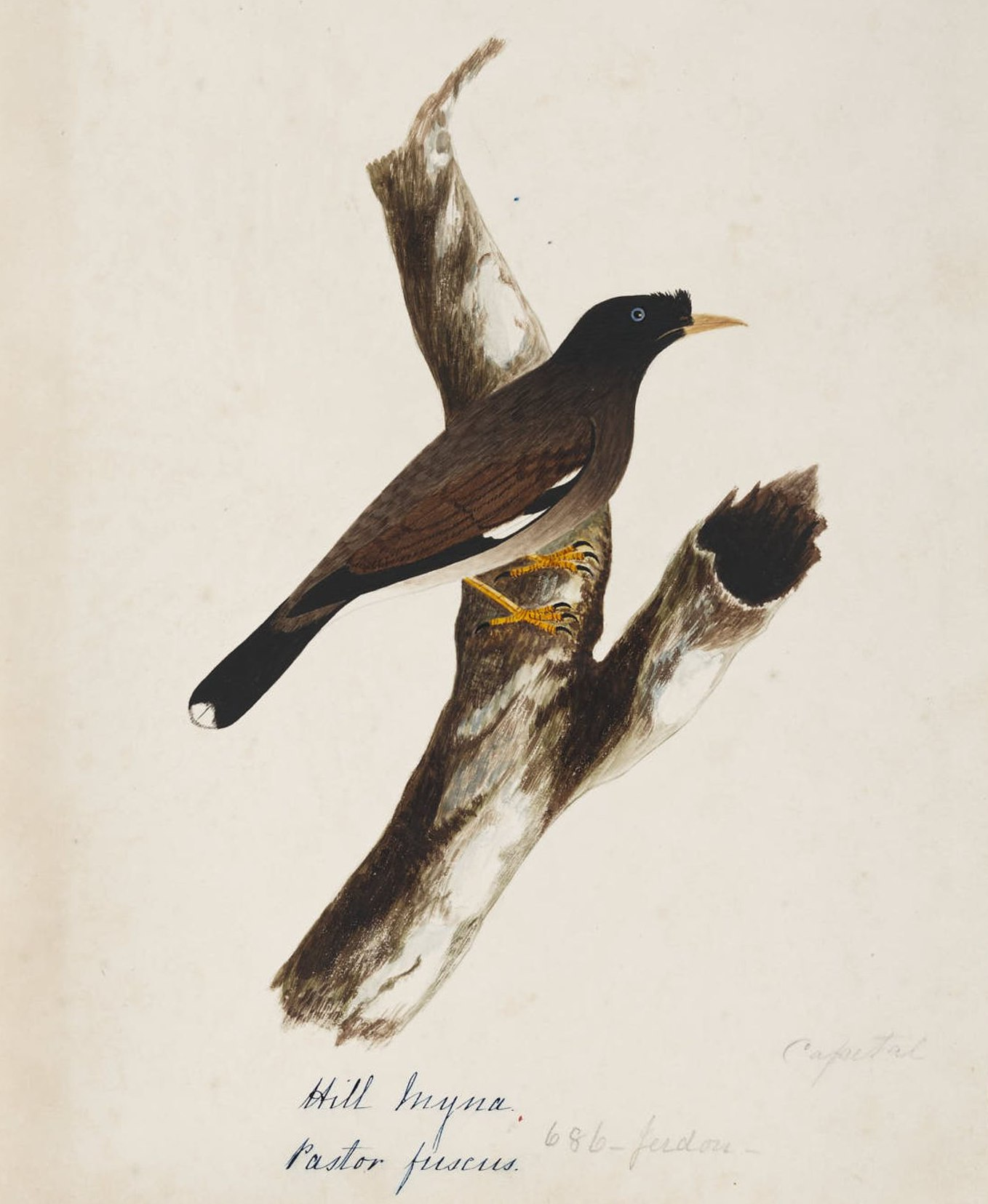
Acridotheres fuscus

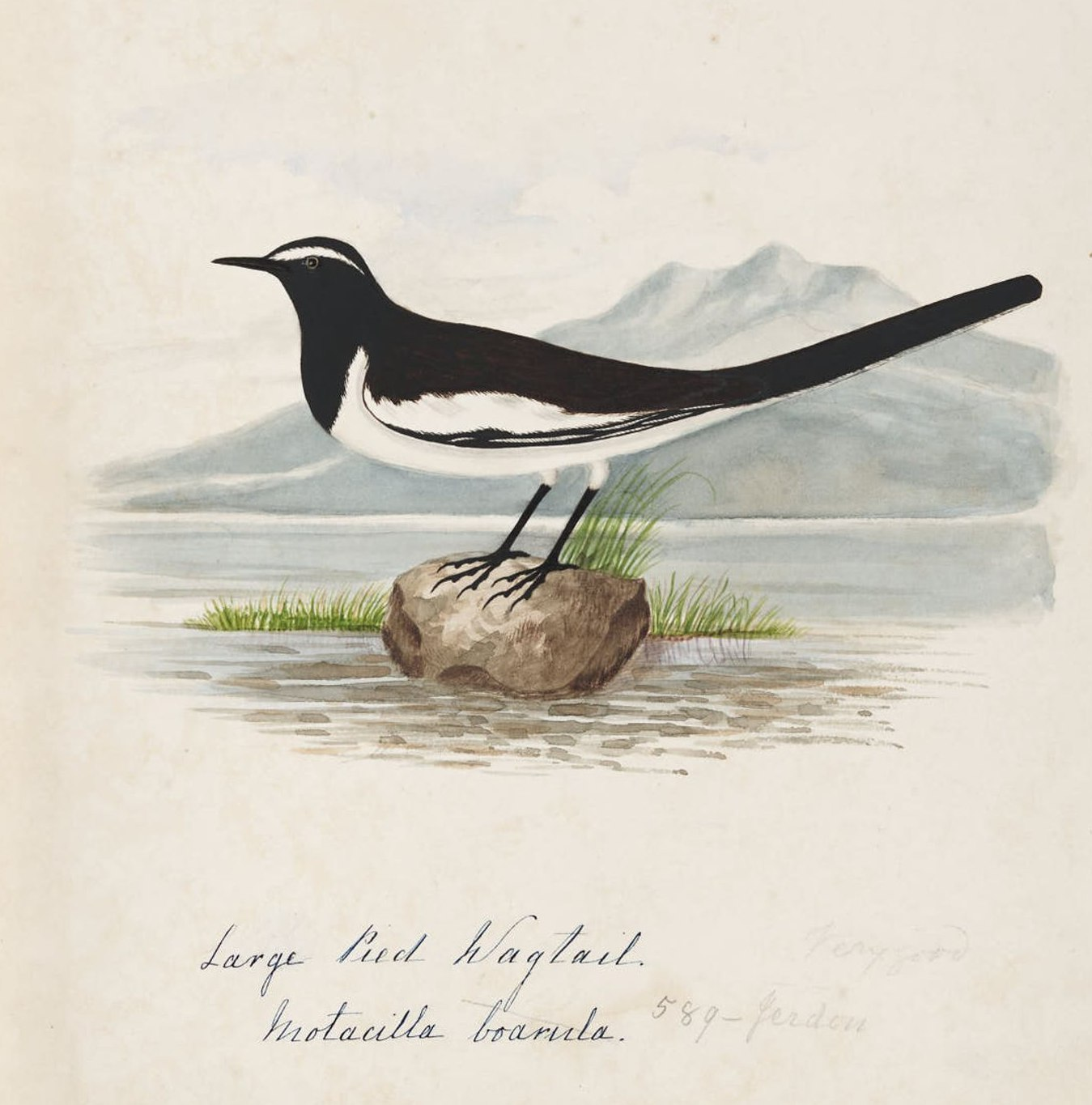
Motacilla maderaspatensis

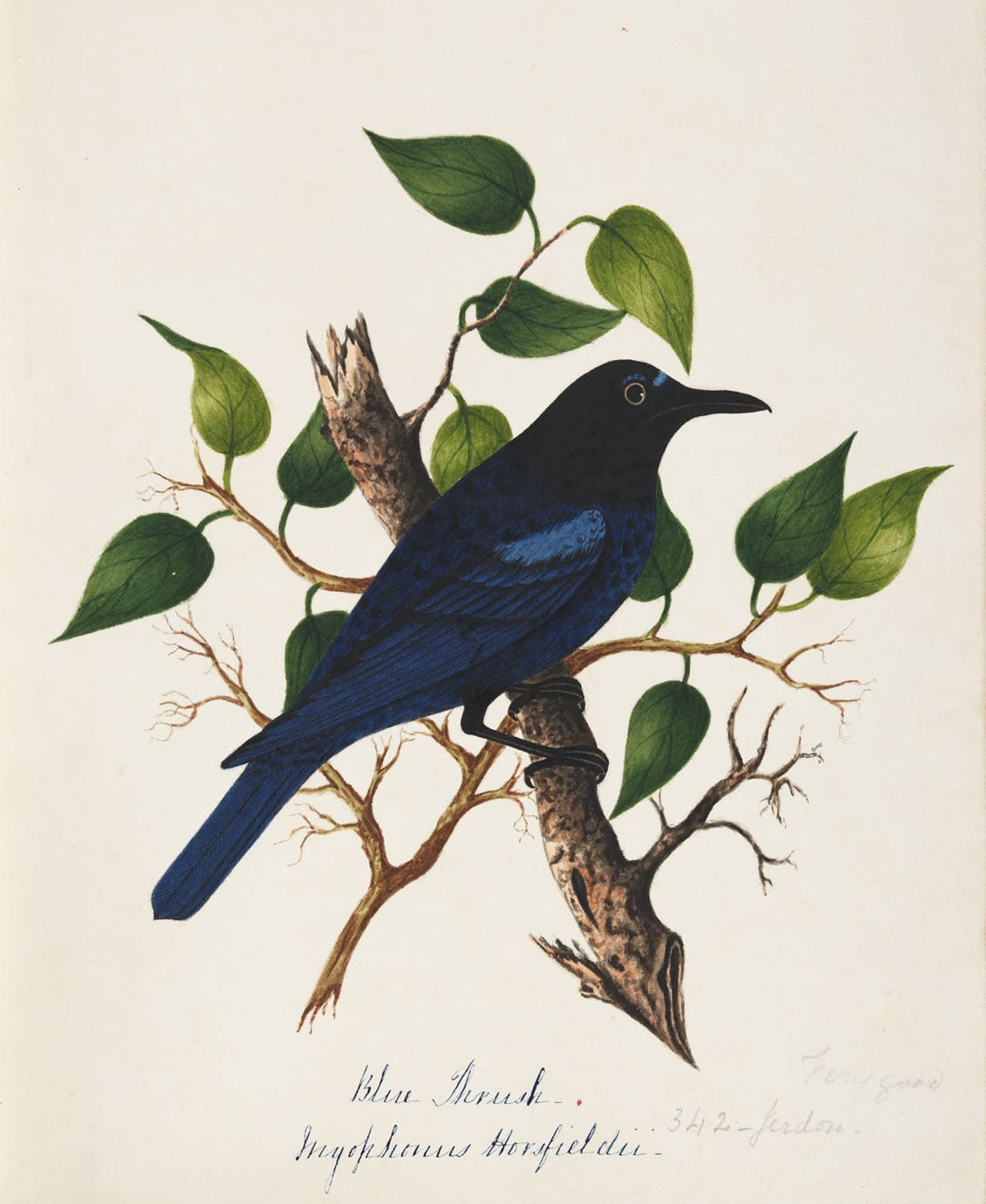
Myophonus horsfieldii

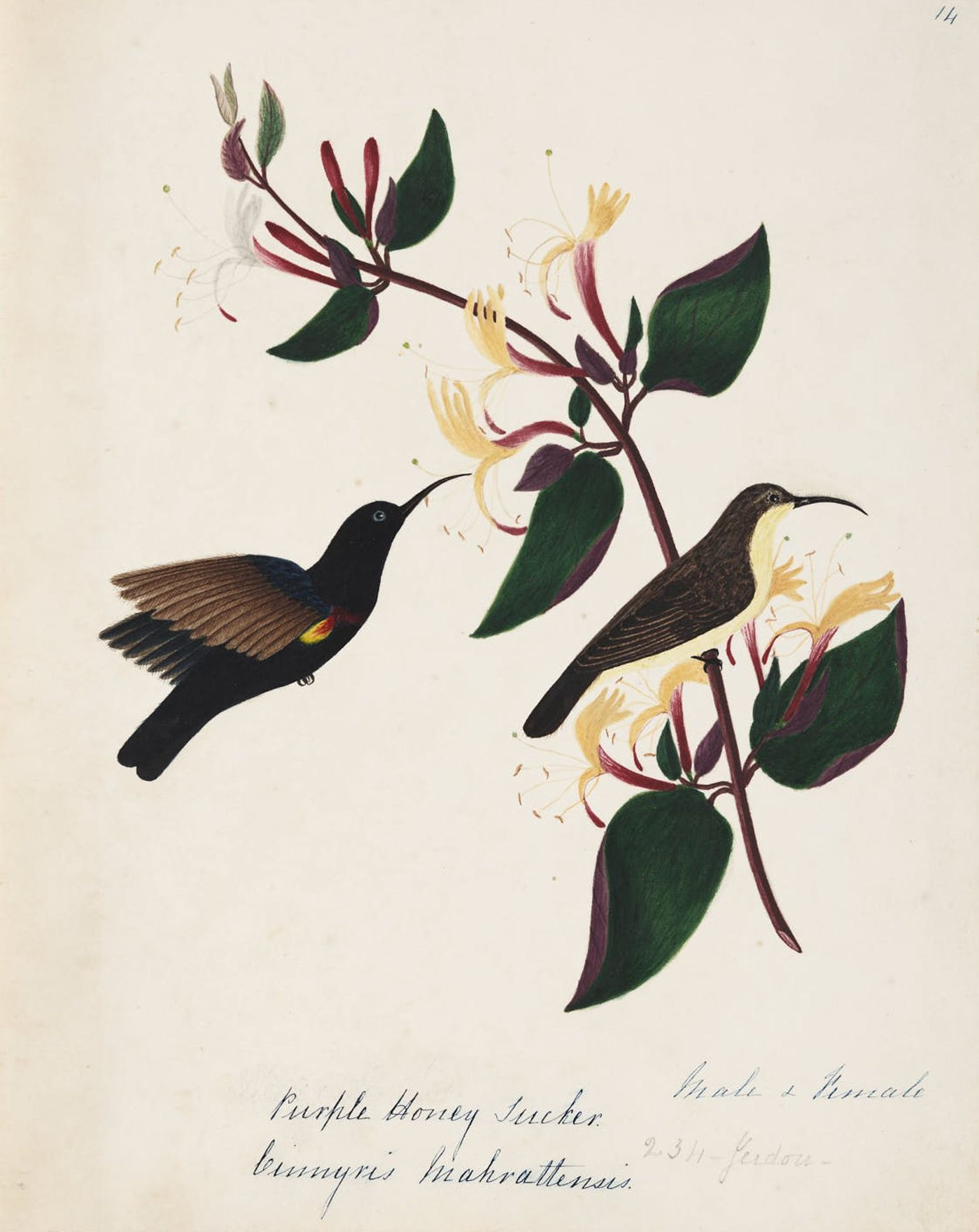
Cinnyris asiaticus

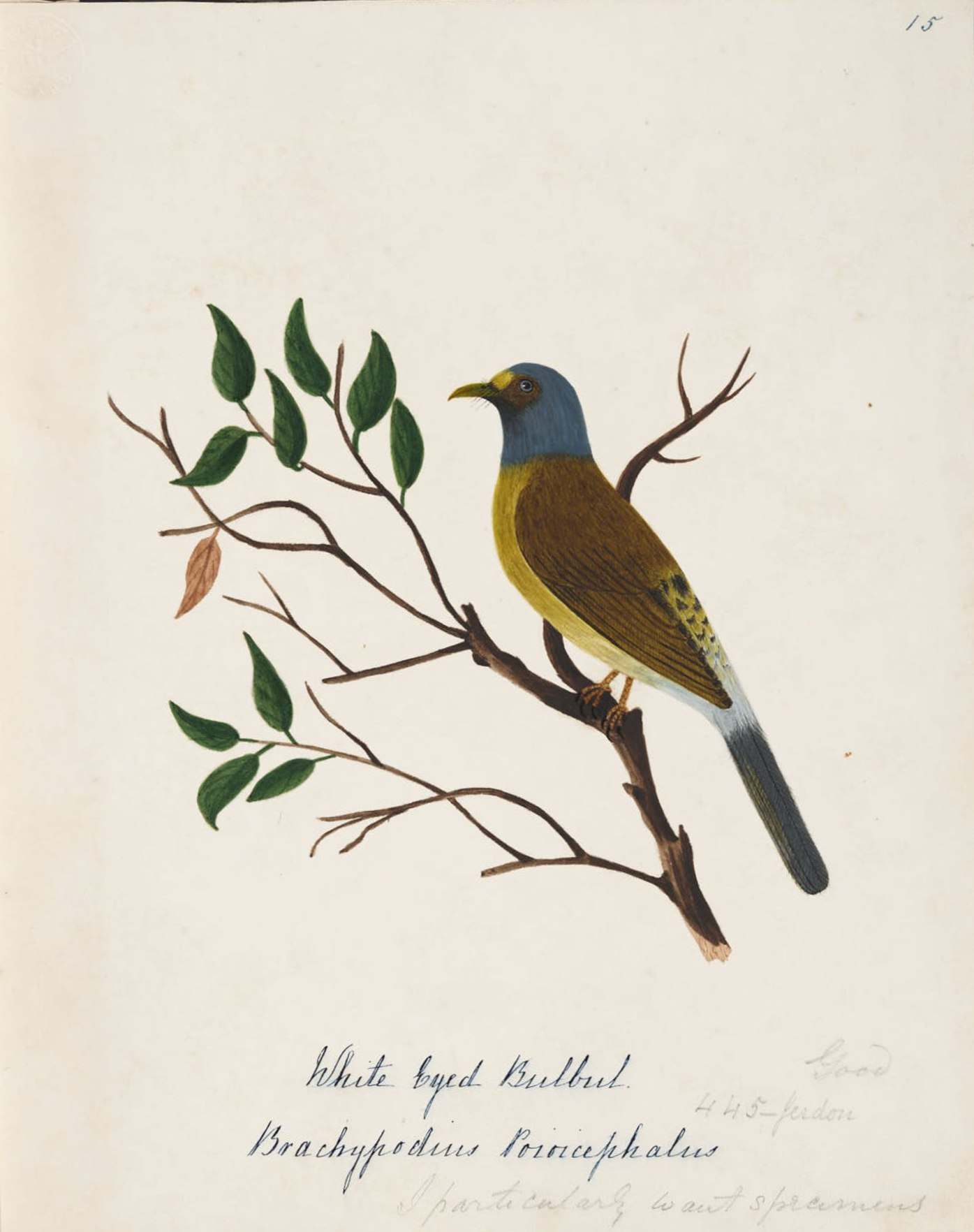
Brachypodius priocephalus

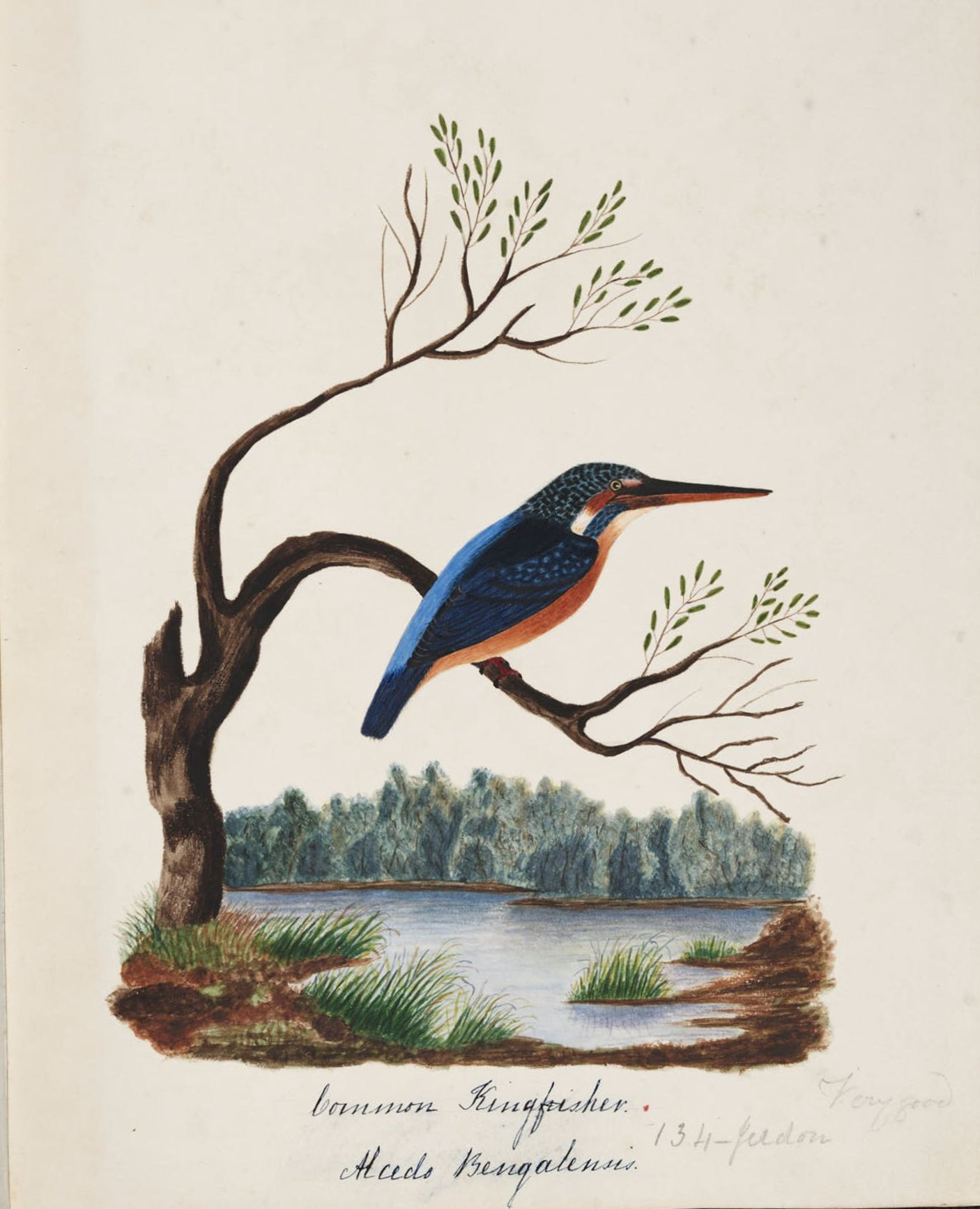
Alcedo atthis

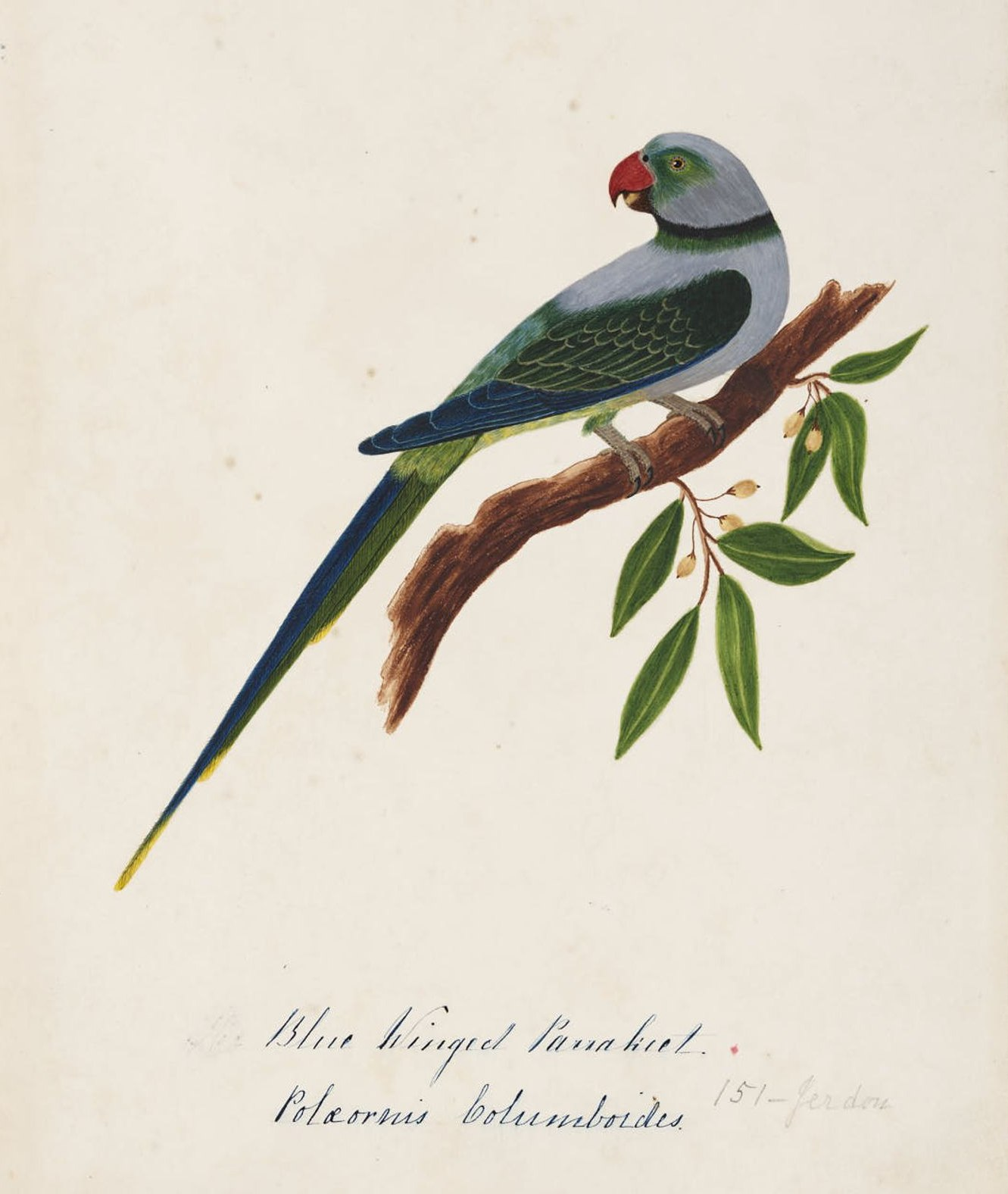
Psittacula columboides

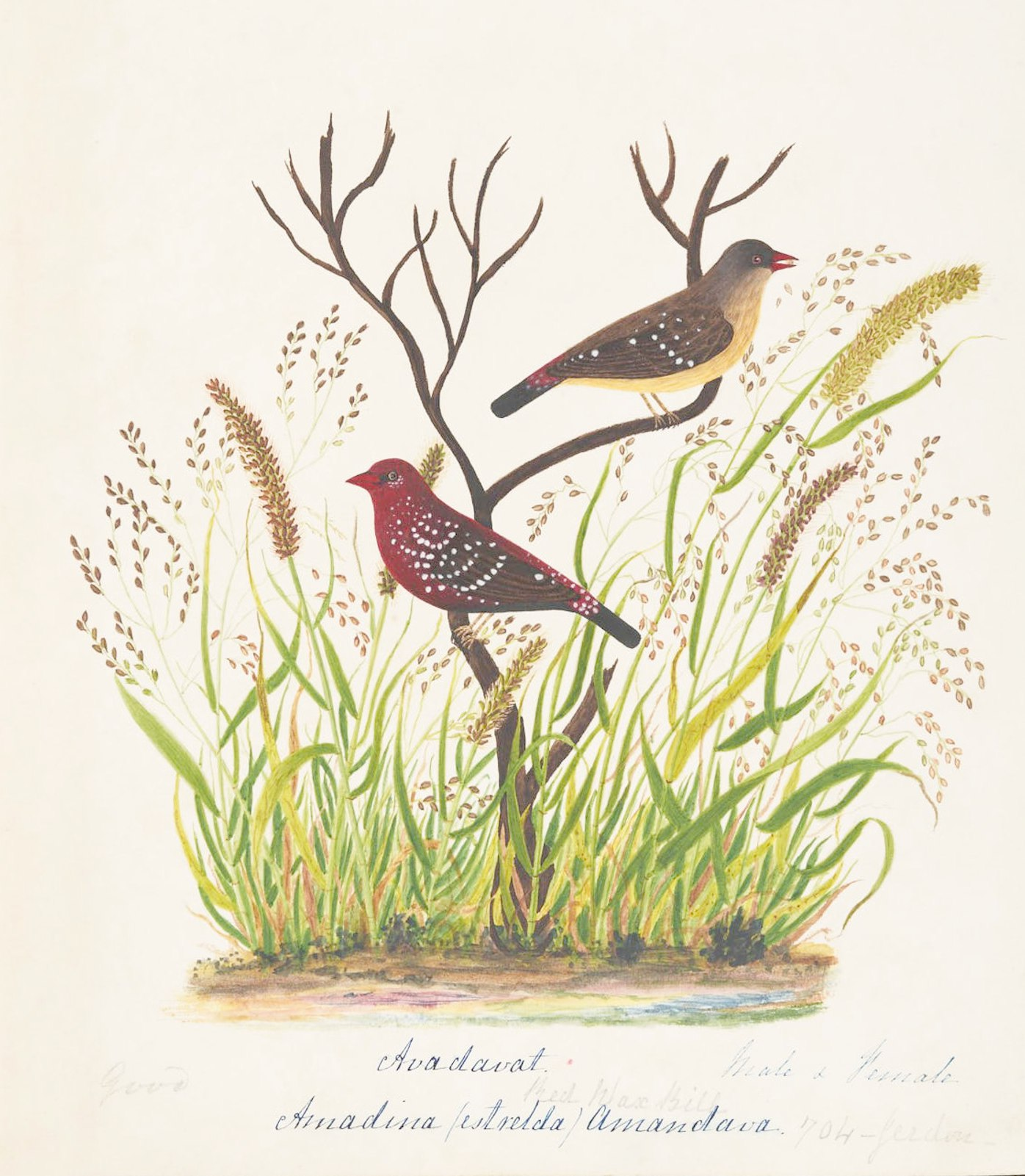
Estrilda amandava

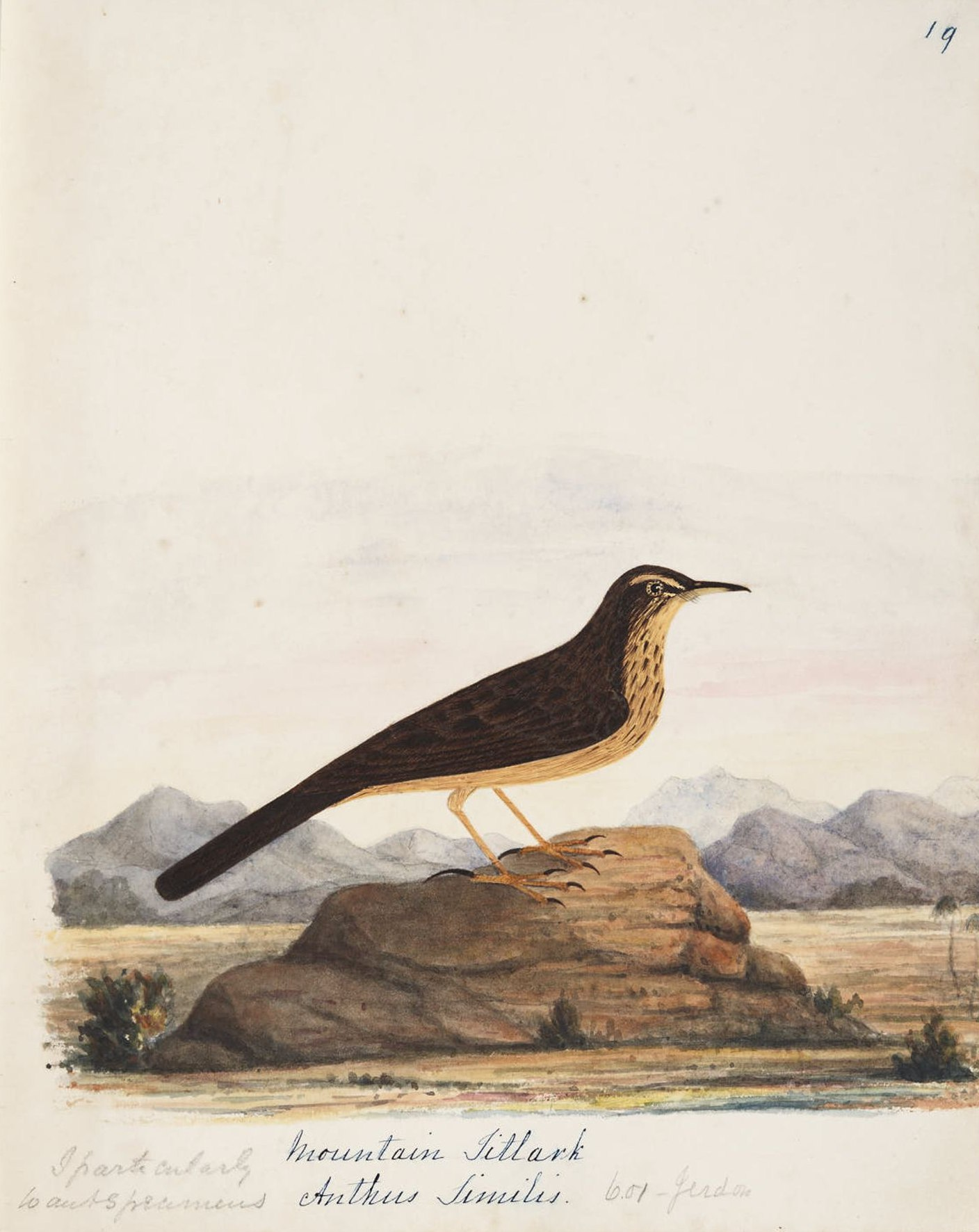
Anthus similis
