= David Cockburn =

British philosopher (born 1949)

David Cockburn (born 12 October 1949) studied philosophy at St Andrews and Oxford, and taught at Swansea, the Open University, and, latterly, the University of Wales, Lampeter and its successor institution the University of Wales Trinity Saint David. He taught courses on the philosophy of mind, Spinoza, Wittgenstein among others. He held a British Academy Readership in 1994–96, during which he wrote Other Times. He also holds a deep interest and involvement in the human rights group Amnesty International.

== Publications ==
for a complete list visit Lampeter's website

=== As author ===
- An Introduction to the Philosophy of Mind (Palgrave, 2001)
- Other Times: Philosophical perspectives on past, present and future (Cambridge University Press, 1997)
- Other Human Beings (Macmillan, 1990)
- Hume (Open University Press, 1983)

=== As editor ===
- Death and the Meaning of Life (Trivium 27, 1992)
- Human Beings (Proceedings of the Royal Institute of Philosophy Conference, Cambridge University Press, 1991)
