= Alexander de Cokburne =

Scottish nobleman and early ancestor of Clan Cockburn

Sir Alexander de Cokburne (b. c1310, d. c1370) was born into a mid-level landowning family in the Scottish Borders. Through his two marriages, Sir Alexander amassed considerable wealth and power in the Lowland Scottish counties of Berwickshire, West Lothian, East Lothian and Peeblesshire. For the five centuries following Sir Alexander, the Clan Cockburn was, through its significant landholdings and political connections, an influential force in Scottish affairs.

Sir Alexander's parentage is unclear from the surviving record; however, his marriages to two prominent heiresses suggest that he was from a well-known branch of the Cockburn family. In the summer of 1296, along with the bulk of the Scottish nobility and senior clergy, Pieres de Cokeburn and Thomas de Cokeburn 'del counte de Rokesburgh' signed the Ragman Roll pledging their allegiance to King Edward I of England. It seems likely that Sir Alexander was related to Pieres and Thomas, and might very well have been the son of one of them.

In 1330, Sir Alexander de Cokburne became the Baron of Langton (in Berwickshire), Carriden (in West Lothian) and Bolton (in East Lothian) following his marriage to the wealthy Anglo-Norman heiress Mariota de Veteriponte (also known as Maria de Vipont). Mariota's father, Sir William de Veteriponte, had fallen at the Battle of Bannockburn in 1314. The barony of Langton was located to the southwest of Duns, and about 6 km away from Cockburn Tower on the southern slope of Cockburn Law. Sir Alexander's second marriage to the heiress Maria de Monfode added the barony of Skirling (in Peeblesshire).

The greatly enlarged Cockburn lands were split up among Sir Alexander's three sons upon his death. The baronies of Langton and Carriden remained with the eldest son Alexander. John, the second oldest son from his first marriage, received the barony of Bolton. William, the eldest son from his second marriage, received the barony of Skirling. For the next 400 years, the Cockburns of Langton were prominent landowners in Berwickshire. Other branches of the family acquired estates at Ormiston and Clerkington (just southwest of Haddington) in East Lothian.
