= Cockburn Tower =

Building in Berwickshire, Scotland

Coordinates: 55.8248°N 2.3688°W

Cockburn Tower was a small fortified house in Berwickshire, Scotland. Now little more than the outline of a foundation, it occupied a site on the southern slope of Cockburn Law overlooking the Whiteadder Water. The foundations of the Tower trace a roughly square outline measuring 12.8 metres (42 ft) by 11.6 metres (38 ft), according to a survey conducted in 1980.

== History ==
The land surrounding Cockburn Tower belonged to the powerful Dunbar family in the early 15th century. In 1425 Sir David de Dunbar of Cockburn, brother of the ill-fated 11th and last Earl of Dunbar and March, bestowed this land to his daughter Marjorie/Margaret upon her marriage to Alexander Lindsay, 2nd Earl of Crawford. In about 1527, William Cockburn purchased the land from Alexander Lindsay, 4th Earl of Crawford. William Cockburn was the second son of Sir William Cockburn, Baron of Langton, who fell at the Battle of Flodden in 1513. From 1527 until 1698 Cockburn Tower was the seat of the Cockburns of that Ilk. However, in 1696 the Tower and surrounding land were auctioned off to pay the debts of Sir James Cockburn of that Ilk, 1st Baronet. It seems that the Tower fell into disuse soon thereafter, and by 1820 it was already a roofless ruin, although significant portions of the walls remained standing. It seems likely that much of the stone of Cockburn Tower was used to build the farmhouse and outbuildings of nearby Cockburn Farm.

== See also ==
- Clan Cockburn
