= Rod Cobain =

Australian rules footballer

Personal information
- Full name: Rod Cobain
- Born: 21 July 1946 (age 80)
- Original team: Reservoir
- Height: 183 cm (6 ft 0 in)
- Weight: 83 kg (183 lb)

Playing career^{1}
Years	Club	Games (Goals)
1966–69	Fitzroy	27 (18)
- ^{1} Playing statistics correct to the end of 1969.

Rod Cobain (born 21 July 1946) is a former Australian rules footballer who played with Fitzroy in the Victorian Football League (VFL).
