= Cockbain =

Cockbain is a surname shared by Australia's rugby-playing brothers, of which Matt is the oldest:

- Brent Cockbain
- Matt Cockbain

It is also the surname shared by the English cricket-playing father and son:

- Ian Cockbain Sr.
- Ian Cockbain Jr.
