= Gavinton =

Village in Scottish Borders, Scotland, UK

Coordinates: 55.763°N 2.369°W

Gavinton is a small settlement in the Scottish Borders area of Scotland, 2 kilometres (1.2 mi) south-west of Duns, the former county town of Berwickshire. The hamlet sits on a minor road off the A6105 Duns to Greenlaw road at grid reference NT767521.

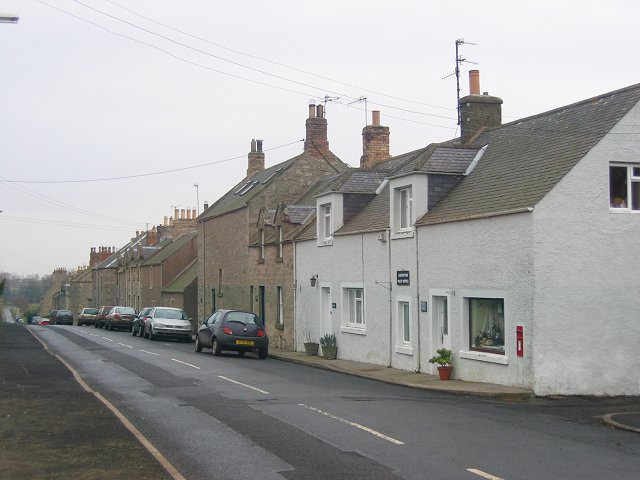
Gavinton in Berwickshire

== History ==
Gavinton is a relatively new settlement, having been established as a planned estate village in 1759 when David Gavin, the local landowner, decided to demolish the village and the church of Langton, which were situated on his estate, and rebuild them outwith the walls on Crimson Hill.

The first records of the area came in the reign of David I of Scotland when Roger d'Eu, the king's retainer, was in possession of lands and church of Langton. Richard was succeeded at Langton by William de Veteriponte (Vipont) and that family were the lairds until 1314 when Sir William, Lord of Langton, died at the Battle of Bannockburn in 1314. The lordship at Langton Tower passed to Sir Alexander Cockburn when he married Mary, the Vipont heiress.

In 1496, King James IV of Scotland sent his artillery to Langton to prepare for an English incursion. Mary Queen of Scots was believed to have spent a night at Langton Tower during a survey of the border lands. The old village of Langton, so called because of its straggling layout (Longtown), was attacked and razed to the ground in 1558 by Sir Henry Percy, Earl of Northumberland.

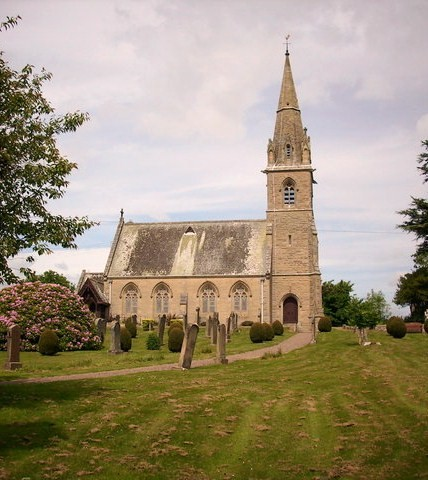
Parish Church of Langton

Sir Alexander Cockburn, 7th. Baronet of Langton, died at the Battle of Fontenoy in 1745 and another chapter of the Langton story came to an end.

In 1758 David Gavin bought Langton and wasted no time in demolishing the historic old tower and building a new house. David married the daughter of the Earl of Lauderdale and their daughter married the Earl of Breadalbane.

In 1886 another Earl of Breadalbane bought Langton House and immediately set about building a magnificent new home. The Breadalbanes lived there until 1920 when they decided to abandon it. The roof was removed and the house was partially demolished in 1930. The house was finally demolished in 1950 though the farm buildings remain and are still used. Like the ancient tower, church and village, Langton House has disappeared below the fields. The name, Langton, though lives on in the parish and the church.

== See also ==
- Crosshall cross
- List of places in the Scottish Borders
- List of places in Scotland
