= Arthur Cobain =

Australian rules footballer

Personal information
- Full name: Arthur John Cobain
- Born: 2 November 1880; St Kilda, Victoria
- Died: 29 August 1941 (aged 60); Heidelberg, Victoria
- Original team: Railways

Playing career^{1}
Years	Club	Games (Goals)
1909	St Kilda	1 (0)
- ^{1} Playing statistics correct to the end of 1909.

Arthur John Cobain (2 November 1880 – 29 August 1941) was an Australian rules footballer who played for the St Kilda Football Club in the Victorian Football League (VFL).
