= John Coburn (silversmith) =

American silversmith

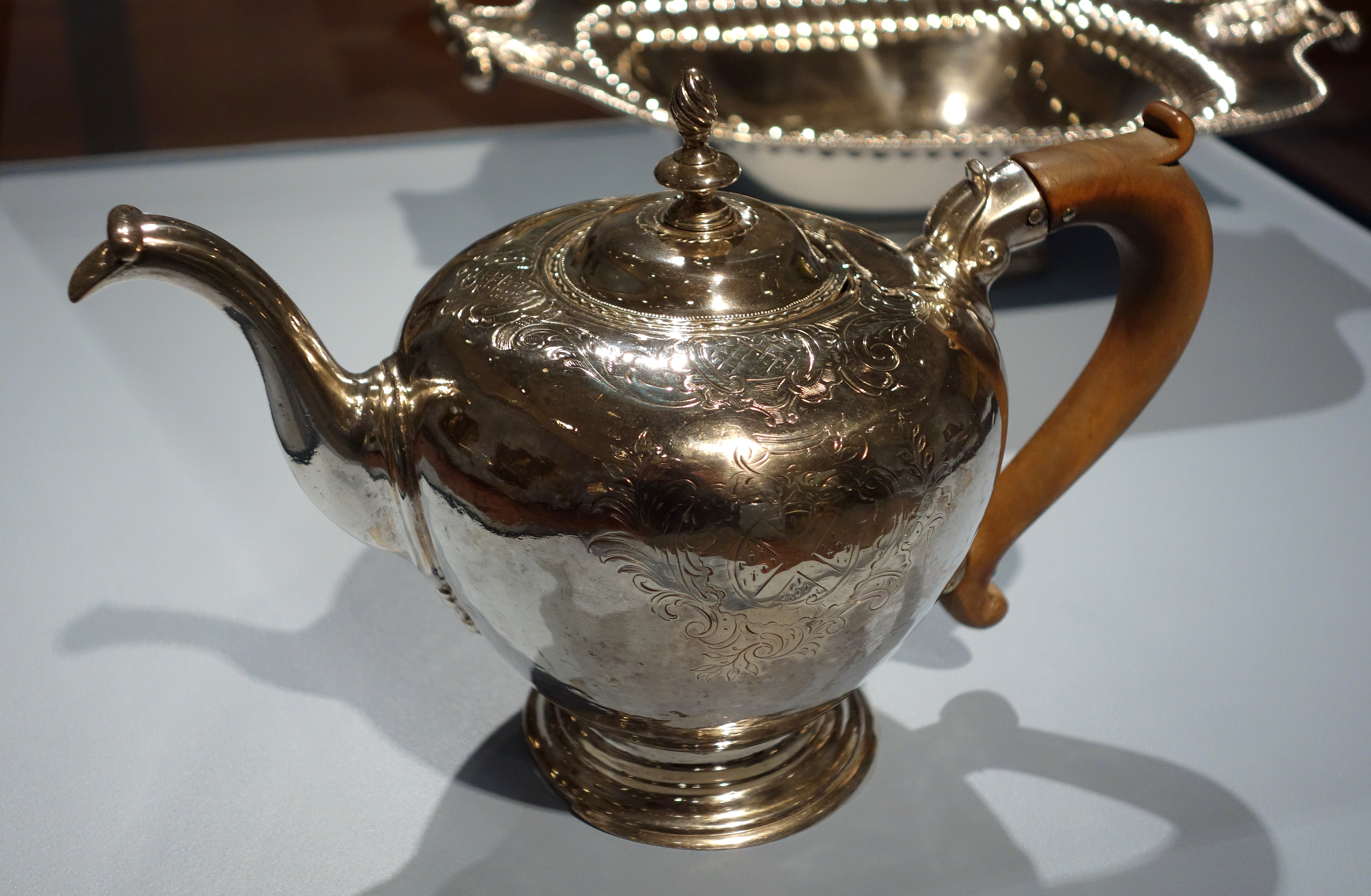
Teapot by John Coburn, c. 1750

John Coburn (May 25, 1724 – January 20, 1803) was a noted silversmith active from about 1745 to 1790 in Boston, Massachusetts. Coburn was born in York, Massachusetts (now in Maine) and apprenticed circa 1737 to John Edwards in Boston. He is best known for his tea-serving items, and also for silver objects for churches in Massachusetts, Connecticut, and Maine. His work is collected in the Museum of Fine Arts, Boston, and the Yale University Art Gallery.
