= M. D. Cockburn =

8th Collector of Salem District
- In office 15 February 1820 – 11 May 1829
- Preceded by: S. Smith
- Succeeded by: R. Nelson

Personal details
- Born: Montague Dundas Cockburn; 31 January 1789
- Died: 28 September 1869 (aged 80)
- Resting place: Kotagiri, Nilgiris District, Tamil Nadu, India
- Spouse: Catherine Jane Lascelles (died 1879)
- Children: Margaret Cockburn

Montague Dundas Cockburn (/ˈkoʊbərn/ KOH-bərn; 31 January 1789 – 28 September 1869) was a Scottish coffee planter, and Collector of Salem district (in Madras Presidency, British India) between 1820 and 1829. He was the father of ornithologist and painter Margaret Cockburn.

Cockburn is known as the "Father of Yercaud" for developing the resources of the Shevaroy Hills, and for introducing the cultivation of coffee, pears and apples into most of the hill stations of Madras Presidency, particularly in Yercaud, a small hill station in Salem District.

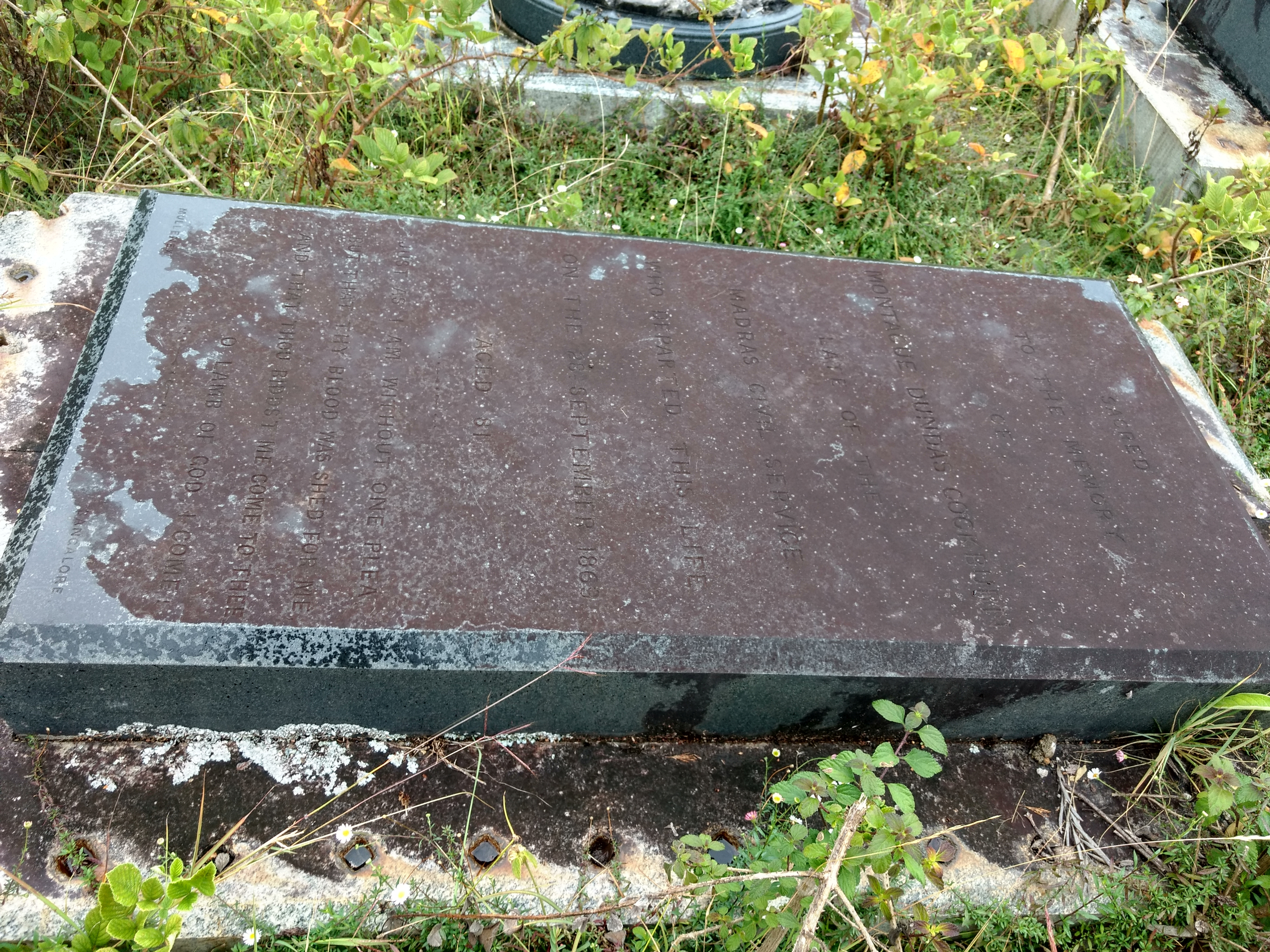
Grave in Kotagiri

Cockburn helped in improving the coffee plantations in Tamil Nadu. While he was collector of Salem, he visited many hill stations, like Yercaud and Kotagiri, and it was when he visited Yercaud in 1820 that he introduced coffee plants from Arabia. Cockburn erected a small hut which is now known as Grange Estate. During the Indian Rebellion of 1857, the building was fortified to form a castle-like structure, and is an important landmark today. The first coffee estate in Kotagiri was planted by Cockburn in 1843, in Kanhutty. Catherine Falls, located 7 km from Kotagiri, is sometimes claimed to be named after his wife, Catherine Jane Lascelles (died 30 August 1879) although the name of St. Catherine's Falls is recorded from 1852.
