= William Cockburn (cavalry officer) =

Scottish Royalist cavalry leader (c. 1605–1683)

Major William Cockburn (c.1605–1683) was the son of William Cockburn (late of Skirling) and Joneta Hamilton, the daughter of Sir James Hamilton of Libberton. Major Cockburn is best known for his role as a Scottish Royalist cavalry leader during the Restoration, when the government of King Charles II sought to forcibly re-impose episcopacy on the Church of Scotland, in violation of the Treaty of Breda that was signed by Charles with the Covenanters in 1650. In the 1670s Major Cockburn was placed in charge of pursuing and capturing Covenanter leaders. Most notably, in June 1673 he captured Alexander Peden at Knockdow near Ballantrae, Ayrshire.

Major William's father had been the laird of the Barony of Skirling, but likely financial difficulties required him to sell the property in 1621. The Cockburns of Skirling had a long military tradition going back hundreds of years.

According to his epitaph, Major Cockburn had military experience in Germany and France. His career spanned the period of both the Thirty Years' War in Europe and the English Civil Wars, but it is not known if he fought at home during that tumultuous period. He likely was a member of the Scottish Royalist force that defeated Covenanters at the Battle of Rullion Green in November 1666. In the late 1660s Major Cockburn led dragoons in Southwestern Scotland. In September 1667 he was a lieutenant in the Laird of Hatton's troop, which was raised in 1666 and based in Hawick. Later, he was appointed Under-Lieutenant to the Troop of Life Guards, commanded by the Earl of Newburgh and based in Dumfries. In September, 1668 he was ordered to pursue Covenanters in Galloway and nearby regions. This he did with vigor and notable success. He retired from the Life Guards in 1681, with the honorary rank of lieutenant colonel.

William Cockburn married Marie Melrose and they had one son William and five daughters Elizabeth, Jane, Francisina, Marie and Sarah. Evidently the son followed the family's military tradition: he was referred to as a lieutenant in 1692 when he was retoured heir to his father. Lieutenant Cockburn apparently did not have any male descendants, and so he appears to have been the last of the Cockburns of Skirling.

Lieutenant-Colonel Cockburn died at Stonie-fle (Standenflat, Aberdeenshire) on 6 June 1683. His poetic epitaph, which was considered sufficiently noteworthy to be included in a bound collection of Scottish elegiac verse, was as follows:

Here lyes an honest heart, a valiant hand,
Knew both how to obey and to command,
A loving father, and an husband kind,
A souldier both in body and in mind;
So stout that to the pale beholder's wonder
He durst encounter the amazing thunder.
And did the honour of the Scots advance;
By Prowess both through Germany and France;
His valour and his loyalty was seen
Against the rebels at the Rullzion Green.
He Hector and Ulysses both in one,
Knew to match valour with discretion;
In point of honour when his spleen did rise,
He quell'd his foes by lightning from his eyes.
His martial frown it could at once controul,
And cure the lethargie of a coward's soul.
Nor did his worth alone consist in warrs,
In him Minerva joyned was with Mars;
He owed a breast to which it did appeare,
Valour and Vertue native tenants were;
Yea vertue sway'd her sceptre there, for both
He fear and baseness equally did loath.
And in his heart, which was a sign of grace,
God, and the Church, and King, had chiefest place;
As King and Church did gratefully regard him,
So God hath call'd him home now to reward him.
Therefore let's modestly bewail our crosse,
Heaven's gain and his can never be our losse.
