= Bill Cockburn =

English footballer

Personal information
- Full name: William Robb Cockburn
- Date of birth: 3 April 1937
- Date of death: 24 August 1995 (aged 58)

Senior career*
Years	Team	Apps	(Gls)
1955–1960	Burnley	0	(0)
1960	Gillingham	62	(1)
- * Club domestic league appearances and goals

William Robb Cockburn (3 May 1937 – August 1995) was an English professional footballer. After a five-year stint at Burnley without ever playing for the first team, he joined Gillingham in 1960 and went on to make 62 appearances in the Football League before dropping out of the professional game.
