= John Cockburn (test pilot) =

Scottish test pilot

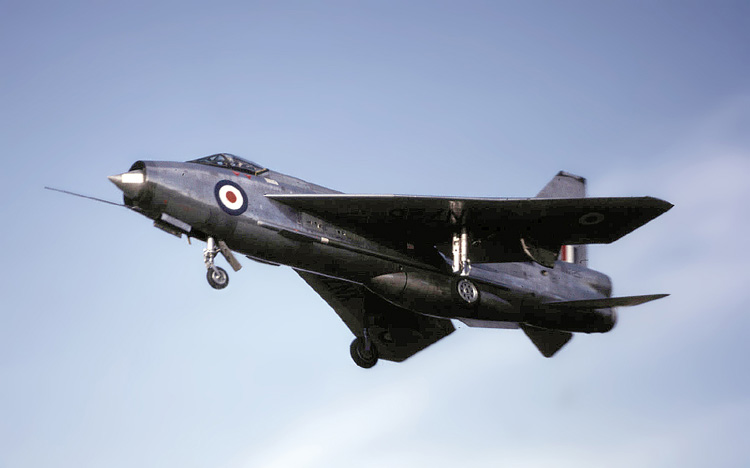
A Lightning F.3 in 1964

John Jeremy Cockburn OBE (14 October 1937 – 3 April 2017) was a Scottish test pilot known for his flights in the English Electric Lightning.

== Early life ==
John Cockburn was born on 14 October 1937 at Greenlaw, Berwickshire, the son of a farmer. He was educated at the Loretto School, Musselbrough. He was a keen horseman, his uncle was the trainer Stewart Wright, and he won the Berwickshire point-to-point steeplechase in 1960 and 1964.

== Marriage ==
In 1964 he married Amy Thompson, known as Judy, after they met water-skiing at Hoselaw Loch. They had a son and two daughters.

== Death ==
Cockburn died on 3 April 2017. He was survived by his wife and children. He received obituaries in The Times, The Daily Telegraph, and The Scotsman.
