= William Cockburn (physician) =

Scottish physician (1669–1739)

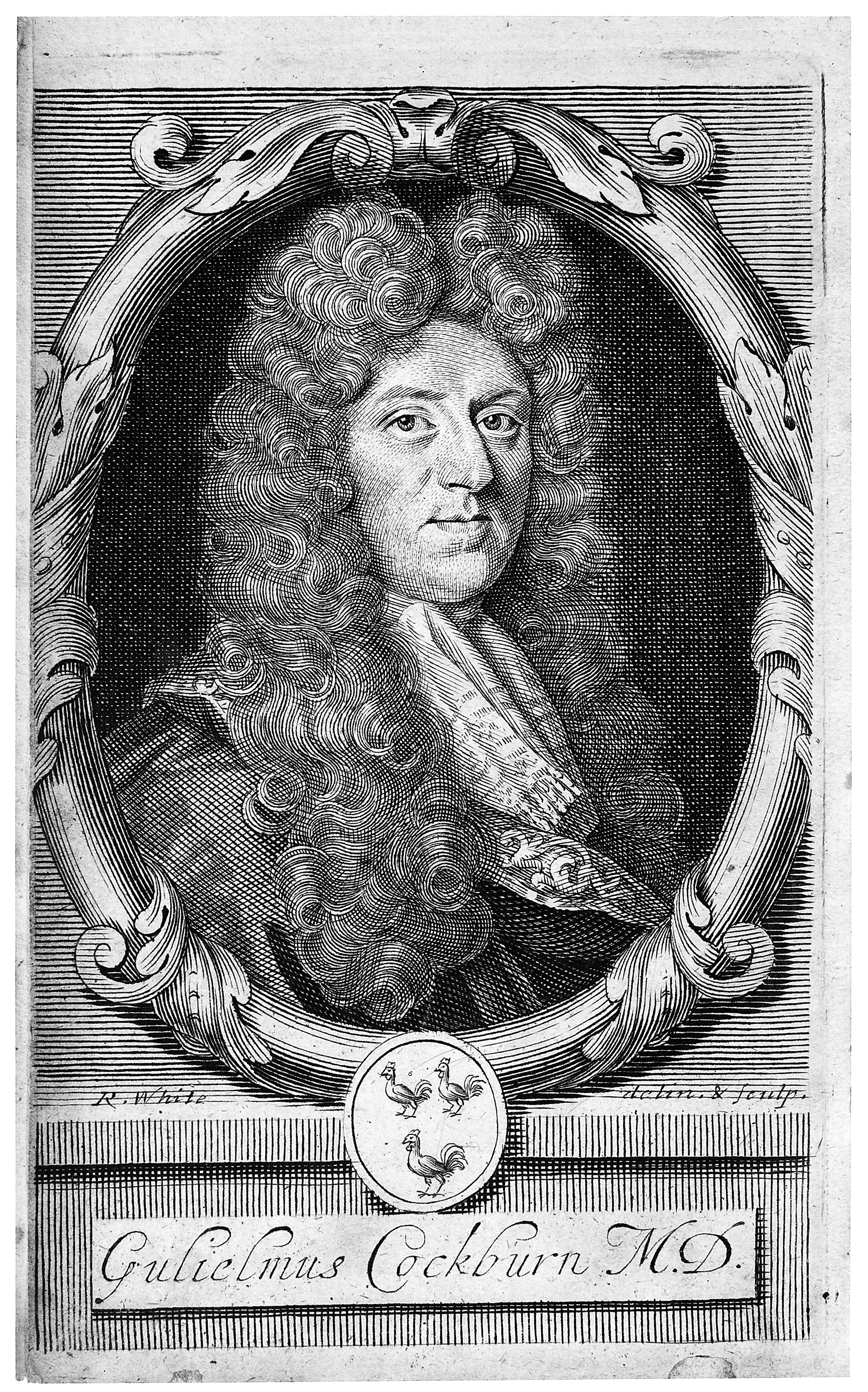
Portrait of William Cockburn. Credit: Wellcome Library

William Cockburn M.D. (1669–1739) was a Scottish physician, known for his dysentery remedy and as Jonathan Swift's doctor.

== Life ==
Cockburn proceeded M.A. at the University of Edinburgh. His name occurs in the register of the University of Leyden as a student of medicine on 29 May 1691, and there heard the lectures of Archibald Pitcairne, a continuing influence on his writings. On 2 April 1694 he became a licentiate of the College of Physicians of London, and about the same time was appointed physician to the Blue squadron of the fleet.

Through his connection with the fleet Cockburn was able to introduce his secret remedy for dysentery, which made his fortune. One account given is that in July 1696 he was dining on board one of the ships in the company of Lord Berkeley of Stratton, when it was remarked to him that "there was nothing farther wanting but a better method of curing fluxes". Cockburn replied that he thought he could be of use. A trial was made next day on 70 patients on board HMS Sandwich, and proved successful. The result was reported to the admiralty board by Sir Clowdisley Shovell, who was directed to purchase a quantity of the electuary for the use of the Mediterranean squadron. Cockburn supplied the fleet with his electuary for 40 years.

The date of Cockburn's moving in London as a physician is not known exactly. He had a large private practice, and in 1731 became physician to Greenwich Hospital. When Jonathan Swift came to London in September 1710, on his three years' visit chronicled in the Journal to Stella, the first of his recorded dinners was with Cockburn. Although Swift preferred the society of other doctors—John Arbuthnot, John Freind, and Samuel Garth—he chose Cockburn as his medical adviser.

Cockburn died in November 1739, aged 70, and was buried in the middle aisle of Westminster Abbey.

== Works ==
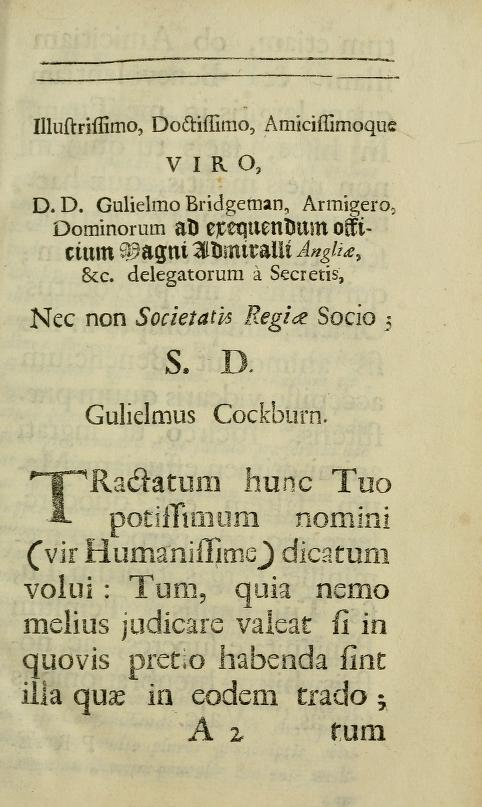
Dedication of Œconomia Corporis Animalis (1695) by William Cockburn

Cockburn's first book, Œconomia Corporis Animalis, was published in 1695. It was a sort of scheme of general pathology, or first principles of physic, showed the influence of Pitcairne's mechanistic theories, and was dedicated to William Bridgeman of the Admiralty. The context was an absence of maritime health literature. In 1696 he brought out a small work on the Nature and Cure of Distempers of Seafaring People, with Observations on the Diet of Seamen in H.M.'s Navy, a record of his two years' experience as ship's doctor on the home station.

Other writings were on venereal diseases: Lues venerea, and on the Symptoms, Nature, and Cure of a Gonorrhoea (four editions, and was translated). In the same class of writings was his Account of the Nature and Cure of Looseness, 2nd ed. 1710.

In 1699 Cockburn contributed a paper on the "Operation of a Blister" to the Philosophical Transactions of the Royal Society, of which he became fellow. His other writings were pamphlets related to his secret remedy. One of these, The Present Uncertainty in the Knowledge of Medicines, 1703, was a letter to the physicians in the commission for sick and wounded seamen, in which he reproves their narrowness of view. Another on The Danger of Improving Physick (1730) was against physician opponents, particularly to Freind who had turned against him in his History of Physick (1725) after being on good terms for twenty years.

Cockburn translated the De morbis acutis infantum of Walter Harris into English, published in 1693.

== Family ==
Cockburn was twice married: first, in 1698, to Mary de Baudisson, a widow, who died on 6 July 1728, aged 64; and again on 5 April 1729 to Lady Mary Fielding, eldest daughter of Basil Feilding, 4th Earl of Denbigh, a patient. A contemporary account of the courtship was that he found her in tears at the prospect of having to leave London for financial reasons, and said, "Madam, if fifty thousand pounds and the heart of an old man will console you, they are at your service".

== Notes ==
Attribution

This article incorporates text from a publication now in the public domain: Stephen, Leslie, ed. (1887). "Cockburn, William (1669-1739)". Dictionary of National Biography. Vol. 11. London: Smith, Elder & Co.
