= David Coburn (athletic director) =

American college sports administrator

Biographical details
- Education: Florida State

Administrative career (AD unless noted)
- 2018–2021: Florida State

David K. Coburn is a former American college athletics administrator. He was named athletic director in May 2019 after being the interim athletic director.

== Education ==
Coburn is a triple alumnus of Florida State University, receiving his Juris Doctor degree from the Florida State College of Law. Since 2012, Coburn has also taught political science and law classes for Florida State.

== Athletic director ==
=== Florida State ===
Coburn was named the 12th athletic director of Florida State in May 2019 after being the interim athletic director for the previous 8 months. It was announced that Coburn would retire in 2022 with his explanation being that Florida State needed a younger athletic director to oversee Florida State during new, unprecedented times.
