= Katherine Washington =

American basketball player (1933–2019)

No. 5, 8 – Nashville Business College
- Position: Guard
- League: Amateur Athletic Union

Personal information
- Born: Murfreesboro, Tennessee, U.S.
- Listed height: 5 ft 9 in (1.75 m)
- Listed weight: 125 lb (57 kg)
- Women's Basketball Hall of Fame
Medals
Women's basketball
Representing the United States
World Championship
Gold medal – first place	1953 Chile	Team competition
Gold medal – first place	1957 Brazil	Team competition
Pan American
Gold medal – first place	1959 Chicago	Team competition

Katherine Washington (June 24, 1933 – September 19, 2019) was an American women's basketball player who played on the first two U.S. women's national teams, earning world championships in 1953 and 1957. Washington played for the Nashville Business College team of the Amateur Athletic Union, and later for Wayland Baptist College, earning All-American honors six times. Washington was inducted into the Women's Basketball Hall of Fame in 2000.

== AAU ==
Washington played for the Nashville Business College AAU team, one of the dominant teams of the 1950s and 1960s. She joined the team in 1952 while still a high school senior and was the only player on the team at the time to earn All-American status. Washington transferred to the Wayland Baptist team, which won the AAU National championship in 1959.

== USA Basketball ==
The first World Championship for women was organized in 1953. AAU teams had been holding national tournaments for years, but this event, held in Santiago, Chile in March 1953, was the first major international tournament for women. The team sent by the US was composed largely of players from the Nashville Business College(NBC) AAU team, including coach John L. Head. Washington was one of the seven NBC players on the team, as well as the youngest at the age of 20. Traveling in South America was an adventure at the time. The team visited Panama and Cuba on their way to the event, and played a scrimmage against the Cuban national team. There were plans to visit Ecuador and Nicaragua, but the visit was cancelled due to riots. Fans occasionally threw rocks at the players, and some of the bench players had to find refuge under the stand. When a player for the host team, Chile, fouled out during the third quarter, the game had to be temporarily stopped due to demonstrations by the 30,000 fans in attendance.

With no international experience, it wasn't clear how well the US team was expected to compete. However, while the team lost an early round game to Brazil, they won the remaining games, including the gold medal game against Chile 49–36, to claim the gold medal, and the first World Championship. Washington was voted MVP.

Washington continued to play for the US National team in the 1957 World Championships, held in Rio de Janeiro, Brazil. The team was more balanced this time. There were four NBC players, including Nera White, but there were eight other players from five other teams, such as Joan Crawford who played for Clarendon Junior College (although would go on to play for NBC). The team lost a close game to Czechoslovakia in preliminary play 53–50, but would avenge the game in a rematch later in the tournament. Overall, the team had eight wins against the single loss. The US team played USSR in the title game, representing the first time these two teams played each other. White, one the US team's best players, was kneed in the mouth in the first half of the game, and could not return to play. The USSR led most of the game, but the US team came back late and took the lead. The USA emerged victorious, winning the game 51–48, and earning the gold medal, and the title of World Champion.

In 1959, the US national team was made up of players from several teams, but seven were from 1952, the Flying Queens team, which represented Wayland Baptist. The coach of the US team was Harley Redin who coached the Flying Queens. Washington was one of the Wayland Baptist players. The team represented the US at the Pan American Games, which were held in Chicago, Illinois, the first time the event had been held in the US. The US team won all eight games, earning the gold medal. Washington averaged 4.8 points per game.

In 1967, Washington was inducted into the Helms Athletic Foundation Hall of Fame as a six-time All-American (1952, 1956–1960).

Inducted into the Martin Methodist Hall of Fame - 1998.

Other Honors:

All-American Fast Pitch - 1968

600 Club Bowling - 1968

Murfreesboro, Tennessee city tennis singles champion - 1952
