= Jack Cockburn =

Australian rules footballer

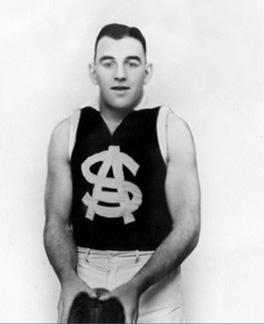

Personal information
- Born: 26 December 1911
- Died: 21 September 1990 (aged 78)
- Original team: Blyth
- Height: 5 ft 11 in (180 cm)
- Weight: 12 st 11 lb (81 kg)
- Position: Half-back line

Playing career^{1}
Years	Club	Games (Goals)
1934–43, 1946–47	South Adelaide	151 (52)
1942–43	South Adelaide-Sturt	16 (7)
1943–44	Essendon	10 (2)
- ^{1} Playing statistics correct to the end of 1947.

Career highlights
- Magarey Medal: 1935; SANFL Hall of Fame: 2003; South Adelaide's 'Team of the Century'; South Adelaide's Best & Fairest: 1935, 1941; Fryar Medal: 1929, 1930 & 1932

Jack Cockburn (26 December 1911 – 21 September 1990) was an Australian rules footballer who played for South Adelaide in the South Australian National Football League (SANFL) and briefly for Essendon in the Victorian Football League (VFL) and Williamstown in the Victorian Football Association (VFA).

Cockburn started his SANFL career with South Adelaide in 1934, having previously played for Blyth as a teenager and young man in the Stanley Football Association, where he won the A. E. Fryar Medal a record three times. He was a member of South Adelaide premiership teams in 1935 and 1938. The 1935 season also saw him win a Magarey Medal for the league's best and fairest player. By the time he retired in 1947 he had played 167 SANFL games and represented South Australia seven times at interstate football. He is a half back flanker in South Adelaide's official 'Team of the Century' and was inducted into the South Australian Football Hall of Fame in 2003.

During World War II he was stationed in Melbourne and in 1943 was signed up by Essendon. He played in Essendon's five-point Grand Final loss to Richmond that year. After playing for Essendon again in 1944, he transferred to Williamstown in the VFA (Note: The VFA did not play its senior competition in 1942, 1943 and 1944, though it resumed its seconds (reserves) competition in the last of those years.) and was ruck-rover in the 1945 premiership side, playing 15 games and kicking 8 goals in his sole season with the Seagulls. Cockburn returned to South Australia in 1946.

Cockburn's daughter, Bronte Cockburn, played basketball for Australia women's national basketball team at the 1957 World Championship held in Brazil.
