= Joan Crawford (disambiguation) =

Joan Crawford (c. 1904–1977) was an American film actress.

Joan Crawford may also refer to:

- Joan Crawford (basketball) (born 1937), American basketball player
- "Joan Crawford" (song), a 1981 song by Blue Öyster Cult
