= NEFL =

NEFL may refer to:

- Neurofilament light polypeptide
- North Eastern Football League, an Australian rules football competition in South Australia
- New England Football League, a semi-professional American football league based in Salisbury, Massachusetts
- Nueva Ecija Rice Vanguards, a Philippine basketball team formerly known as Nueva Ecija ForestLake
