= Agnes Baldwin Webb =

American basketball player (1926–2001)

Agnes Louise Baldwin Webb
No. 11 – Nashville Business College
- Position: Guard
- League: Amateur Athletic Union

Personal information
- Born: March 24, 1926 Cross Plains, Tennessee, U.S.
- Died: June 7, 2001 (aged 75)
- Listed height: 5 ft 9 in (1.75 m)
- Listed weight: 125 lb (57 kg)

Career information
- College: Nashville Business College
Medals
World Championship
Representing the United States
Gold medal – first place	1953 Chile	Team competition

Agnes Louise Baldwin Webb (March 24, 1926 – June 7, 2001) was an American women's basketball player, who played on the first United States women's national basketball team. Baldwin played basketball at Nashville Business College, which was a perennial powerhouse in the Amateur Athletic Union. Baldwin was part of the national team which won the first women's world basketball championship.

Webb died on June 7, 2001, at the age of 75.
