= Stanley Flat, South Australia =

Stanley Flat South Australia
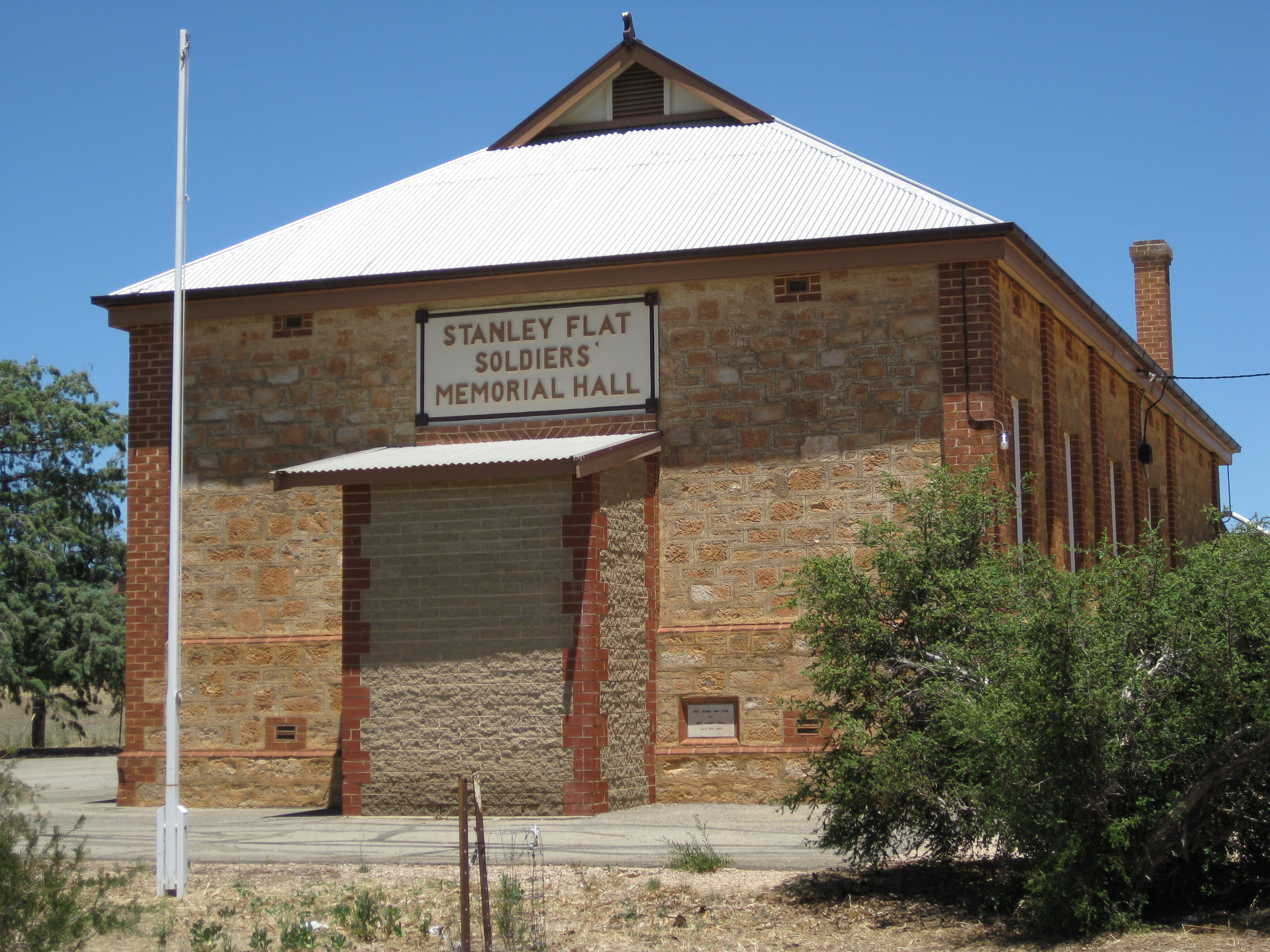
- Stanley Flat Soldiers' Memorial Hall

- Coordinates: 33°47′0″S 138°35′0″E
- Population: 401 (SAL 2021)
- Established: 1850s
- Postcode(s): 5453
- Location: 141 km (88 mi) north of Adelaide; 6 km (4 mi) north of Clare
- LGA(s): District Council of Clare and Gilbert Valleys
- Region: Mid North
- State electorate(s): Frome
- Federal division(s): Grey
- Footnotes: Postcode

Stanley Flat is a locality in the Mid North region of South Australia about 6 kilometres (3.7 mi) north of Clare along the Horrocks Highway. It is where the Clare Racecourse is situated, as well as an institute hall.

== Governance ==
Stanley Flat is governed at the local level by the Clare and Gilbert Valleys Council, located within the state electoral district of Frome and the federal electoral division of Grey.

== See also ==
- Albert Fryar
- County of Stanley
- List of cities and towns in South Australia
- Stanley Football Association
