= Clare Valley Racecourse =

Horse racing venue in South Australia

Coordinates: 33°47′20″S 138°35′32″E

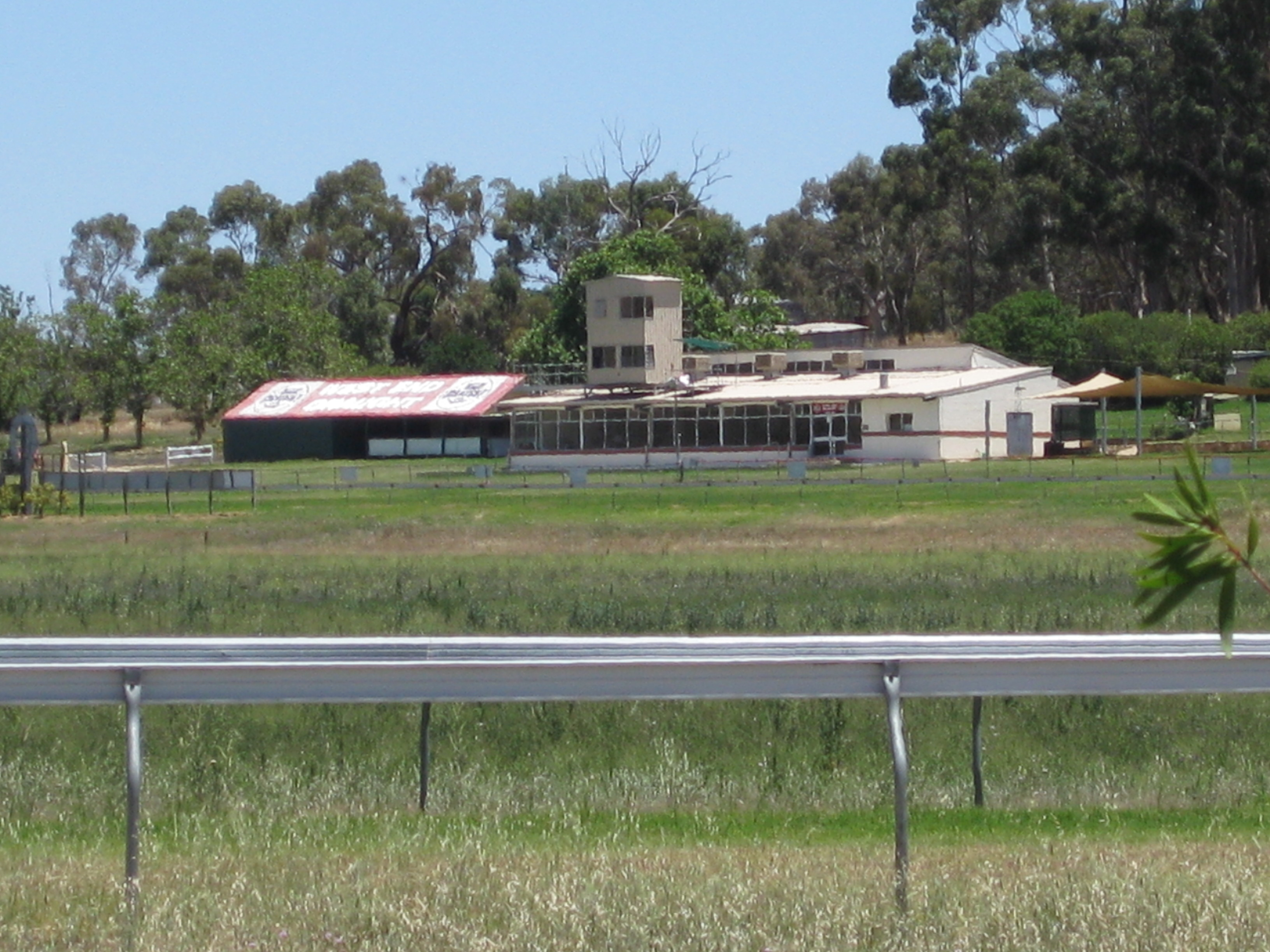
- Interactive map of Clare Valley Racecourse
- Location: Stanley Flat, Clare Valley
- Owner: Clare Valley Racing Club
- Operator: Clare Valley Racing Club
- Surface: Grass

The Clare Valley Racecourse is a racecourse near Stanley Flat, South Australia.

In the early 1880s an annual New Year's Day race meeting took place on a number of local properties in the Clare Valley. Since then, the Clare Valley Racing Club has increased its race dates to three or four annually.

Regular events include Clare Valley Easter Races, April Clare Cup, and races in November.
