= Nancy Hill (basketball) =

Australian basketball player

Personal information
- Born: 21 October 1934 (age 92) Gulgong, New South Wales
- Position: Forward

Nancy May Hill (born 21 October 1934) is a retired Australian women's basketball player.

== Biography ==
Hill played for the Australia women's national basketball team at the 1957 World Championship held in Brazil. She started playing basketball for Lithgow in the early fifties and her talents were soon recognised. Hill played for the New South Wales open Women's team in 1955, 1956, 1958, 1959, 1960, 1961, 1963 and 1964 and captained her State twice.

After retirement from playing, Hill was a major force in the development of the game of basketball in the Lithgow region and at various times held the positions of president, coach and referee in the Lithgow Basketball Association. In 2007, Hill became a Member of the Lithgow Sporting Hall of Fame in the legend category.
