= Stanley Football Association =

The Stanley Football Association was an Australian rules football competition based in the Clare Valley region of South Australia, Australia. It operated between 1915 and 1936 with breaks in 1916-17 and 1919 due to World War I.

== Brief history ==
The Stanley Football Association was formed in 1915 and featured teams (at times) from North Clare, South Clare, Blyth, Stanley Flat, Sevenhill, Farrell Flat, Watervale, Kybunga and Snowtown. The three foundation clubs were North Clare, South Clare and Blyth, all located in the cadastral County of Stanley, a historic administrative area, centred on Clare, from which the association drew its name. The association joined the Mid North Association following the 1936 season. The three original foundation clubs now compete in the North Eastern Football League.

== Clubs ==
=== Final ===
Club	Colours	Nickname	Home Ground	Former League	Est.	Years in SFA	SFA Senior Premierships		Fate
Club	Colours	Nickname	Home Ground	Former League	Est.	Years in SFA	Total	Years	Fate
Blyth		Roosters	Blyth Oval, Blyth	BFA	1900	1915, 1918, 1924-1936	6	1925, 1928, 1930, 1931, 1933, 1935	Played in Broughton FA between 1919-23. Recess between 1937-44, re-formed in Broughton FA in 1945
Farrell Flat		Magpies	Duncan Park, Farrell Flat	KFA	1910	1923-1924, 1926-1927, 1931-1936	2	1934, 1936	Played in Kooringa FA in 1925 and 1928. Moved to Mid North FA in 1937
North Clare			Clare Oval, Clare	–	1915	1915-1918, 1920-1923, 1925-1936	5	1915, 1918, 1922, 1929, 1932	Recess in 1924. Merged with South Clare to re-form Clare in Mid North FA in 1919 and 1937
South Clare		Demons	Clare Oval, Clare	–	1915	1915-1918, 1920-1936	5	1920, 1921, 1924, 1926, 1927	Merged with North Clare to re-form Clare in Mid North FA in 1919 and 1937
Watervale			Watervale Oval, Watervale	MNFA	1875	1921-1936	1	1923	Returned to Mid North FA in 1937

=== Former ===
Club	Colours	Nickname	Home Ground	Former League	Est.	Years in SFA	SFA Senior Premierships		Fate
Club	Colours	Nickname	Home Ground	Former League	Est.	Years in SFA	Total	Years	Fate
Armagh				–	1893	1894	0	-	Folded after 1894 season
Clare		Demons	Clare Oval, Clare	–	1873	1894	0	-	Joined Mid North FA in 1910
Donnybrook Rovers				–	1894	1894	0	-	Folded after 1894 season
Kybunga				–	1924	1924-1929	0	-	Moved to Wakefield FA in 1930
Stanley Flat				–	1920	1920-1925	0	-	Absorbed by North Clare in 1926

== Awards ==
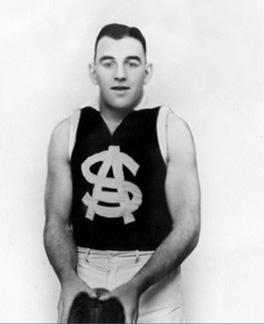
Jack Cockburn, c. 1935

The premiers of the competition won the Stanley Shield. It was first awarded in 1921.

The "A. E. Fryar" medal, was awarded to the player judged (by umpire votes) the fairest and most brilliant footballer during the regular season. The award was given by Albert Fryar, a well-known philatelist and sportsman originally from Clare and first awarded in 1926.

Jack Cockburn won the Fryar Medal a record three times (1929, 1930 & 1932). He would go on to win the Magarey Medal for the fairest and most brilliant player in the South Australian National Football League (SANFL) in 1935. He was also inducted into the SANFL Hall of Fame in 2003.

Year	Premiers	A. E. Fryar Medal	References
1915	North Clare	No award	
1916	No competition	No award	
1917	No competition	No award	
1918	North Clare	No award	
1919	No competition	No award	
1920	South Clare	No award	
1921	South Clare	No award	
1922	North Clare	No award	
1923	Watervale	No award	
1924	South Clare	No award	
1925	Blyth	No award	
1926	South Clare	G. V. Tilbrook (North Clare)	
1927	South Clare	R. Banwell (South Clare)	
1928	Blyth	W. Hogan (South Clare)	
1929	Blyth	Jack Cockburn (Blyth)	
1930	Blyth	Jack Cockburn (Blyth)	
1931	Blyth	Walter Blight (South Clare)	
1932	North Clare	Jack Cockburn (Blyth)	
1933	Blyth	Percy Abbott (Farrell Flat)	
1934	Farrell Flat	Fred Steinhardt (Blyth)	
1935	Blyth	Len Monaghan (Farrell Flat)	
1936	Farrell Flat	Syd Cockburn (Blyth)	

== See also ==
- List of former South Australian regional football leagues
