= 1953 FIBA World Championship for Women =

1st FIBA World Championship for Women

Tournament details
- Host country: Chile
- Dates: 7–22 March
- Teams: 10
- Venue: 1 (in 1 host city)

Final positions
- Champions: United States (1st title)

Tournament statistics
- Top scorer: (France) Colchen 19.2
- PPG (Team): France 48.2

The 1953 FIBA World Championship for Women (Spanish: 1953 Campeonato Mundial FIBA Femenino) was the first edition of the FIBA Women's Basketball World Cup. It was held in Chile from 7 March to 22 March 1953. Ten national teams entered the event under the auspices of FIBA, the sport's governing body. The city of Santiago hosted the tournament. The United States won its first title.

== Venues ==
All games were played at the Estadio Nacional de Chile.

Santiago
Estadio Nacional de Chile

== Format ==
- In the preliminary round, each team played a single game, with the winner advancing to the final round. The losing teams played in the first repass round, while the losing team with the worst point margin played in the second repass round.
- In the first repass round, four teams were paired again and played a single game where the winners advanced to the second repass round and the losing teams to the classification round. In the second repass round, a round-robin group of three teams was formed, where the top team advanced to the final round and the other two teams to the classification round.
- In the final round, a six-team round-robin group was formed to compete for the championship and second through sixth places in the final standings.
- In the classification round another round-robin group of four teams was formed to define seventh through tenth place in the final standings.

== Preliminary round ==
Winners qualify to the final round. Losing teams to the first repass round, and the losing team with the largest point margin to the second repass round.

Times given below are in Chile Standard Time (UTC−4).

7 March
20:30

Boxscore

Peru	22–62	France
Scoring by half: 10–28, 12–34
Pts: Bedregal, Espinoza 6		Pts: Colchen 21

Estadio Nacional de Chile, Santiago

8 March

Boxscore

Cuba	31–50	Brazil
Scoring by half: 16–21, 15–29
Pts: Buergo 11		Pts: Ferrari 19

Estadio Nacional de Chile, Santiago

8 March
19:30

Boxscore

Paraguay	28–60	United States
Scoring by half: 14–25, 14–35
Pts: Escudero 9		Pts: Baldwin 13

Estadio Nacional de Chile, Santiago

10 March

Boxscore

Argentina	39–34	Mexico
Scoring by half: 18–8, 21–26
Pts: Pastorino 9		Pts: Alfaro 8

Estadio Nacional de Chile, Santiago

10 March
22:30

Boxscore

Chile	37–28	Switzerland
Scoring by half: 18–15, 19–13
Pts: Reyes 11		Pts: Girod 12

Estadio Nacional de Chile, Santiago

== Repass round ==
=== First round ===
11 March
21:00

Boxscore

Mexico	33–41	Paraguay
Scoring by half: 16–15, 17–26
Pts: Gamborino 8		Pts: Bataglia 11

Estadio Nacional de Chile, Santiago

11 March
22:30

Boxscore

Cuba	32–28	Switzerland
Scoring by half: 10–14, 22–14
Pts: Suárez 8		Pts: Bartschi 9

Estadio Nacional de Chile, Santiago

=== Second round ===
Qualified for the final round

Team	Pld	W	L	PF	PA	PD	Pts
Paraguay	2	2	0	111	89	+22	4
Cuba	2	1	1	101	98	+3	3
Peru	2	0	2	59	84	−25	2

13 March
21:00

Boxscore

Peru	29–42	Cuba
Scoring by half: 17–28, 12–13
Pts: Bedregal 13		Pts: Gonzales 10

Estadio Nacional de Chile, Santiago

14 March
21:00

Boxscore

Peru	30–42	Paraguay
Scoring by half: 11–19, 19–24
Pts: de Balbuena 14		Pts: López 12

Estadio Nacional de Chile, Santiago

15 March
17:00

Boxscore

Cuba	59–69 (OT)	Paraguay
Scoring by half: 15–17, 28–26 Overtime: 8–8, 8–18
Pts: Aldao, Soler 11		Pts: Escudero 18

Estadio Nacional de Chile, Santiago

== Classification round ==
Team	Pld	W	L	PF	PA	PD	Pts
Peru	3	3	0	106	73	+33	6
Mexico	3	2	1	98	94	+4	5
Switzerland	3	1	2	68	79	−11	4
Cuba	3	0	3	53	79	−26	3

18 March
21:40

Boxscore

Peru	31–20	Cuba
Scoring by half: 13–6, 18–14
Pts: Bedregal 9		Pts: Suárez 9

Estadio Nacional de Chile, Santiago

18 March
22:55

Boxscore

Switzerland	25–40	Mexico
Scoring by half: 9–20, 16–20
Pts: Girod 10		Pts: Alfaro 11

Estadio Nacional de Chile, Santiago

19 March

Boxscore

Peru	34–26	Switzerland
Scoring by half: 20–14, 14–12
Pts: de Balbuena 9		Pts: Girod 11

Estadio Nacional de Chile, Santiago

19 March
23:05

Boxscore

Cuba	28–31 (OT)	Mexico
Scoring by half: 9–7, 13–15 Overtime: 6–9
Pts: Aldao 11		Pts: Alfaro, Gómez 8

Estadio Nacional de Chile, Santiago

20 March

Boxscore

Mexico	27–41	Peru
Scoring by half: 13–26, 14–15
Pts: Alfaro 11		Pts: Bedregal 16

Estadio Nacional de Chile, Santiago

20 March
21:35

Boxscore

Switzerland	17–5	Cuba
Scoring by half: 11–2, 6–3
Pts: Pochon 5		Pts: Morales 3

Estadio Nacional de Chile, Santiago

== Final round ==
Team	Pld	W	L	PF	PA	PD	Pts
United States	5	4	1	188	155	+33	9
Chile	5	3	2	227	207	+20	8
France	5	3	2	227	176	+51	8
Brazil	5	3	2	183	186	−3	8
Paraguay	5	1	4	170	237	−67	6
Argentina	5	1	4	159	193	−34	6

13 March
22:30

Boxscore

France	37–41	United States
Scoring by half: 16–20, 21–21
Pts: Biny 13		Pts: Washington 12

Estadio Nacional de Chile, Santiago

14 March
22:30

Boxscore

Argentina	36–40	Brazil
Scoring by half: 14–11, 22–29
Pts: Pastorino 12		Pts: Ferrari 10

Estadio Nacional de Chile, Santiago

15 March
18:30

Boxscore

Chile	38–44	Argentina
Scoring by half: 10–23, 28–21
Pts: Hurtado 16		Pts: Reyes 16

Estadio Nacional de Chile, Santiago

16 March
21:00

Boxscore

Brazil	37–49	France
Scoring by half: 17–18, 20–31
Pts: Giogio 9		Pts: Colchen 25

Estadio Nacional de Chile, Santiago

16 March
22:30

Boxscore

Chile	67–42	Paraguay
Scoring by half: 24–19, 43–23
Pts: Hurtado 27		Pts: Escobar 10

Estadio Nacional de Chile, Santiago

17 March
22:00

Boxscore

Argentina	22–34	United States
Scoring by half: 15–16, 7–18
Pts: Medrano, Reyes 5		Pts: Bowden 14

Estadio Nacional de Chile, Santiago

18 March
21:00

Boxscore

Paraguay	27–58	France
Scoring by half: 15–21, 12–37
Pts: López 8		Pts: Colchen 18

Estadio Nacional de Chile, Santiago

18 March
22:30

Boxscore

United States	23–29	Brazil
Scoring by half: 7–18, 16–11
Pts: Washington 10		Pts: Ferrari 14

Estadio Nacional de Chile, Santiago

19 March
21:00

Boxscore

Argentina	31–33	Paraguay
Scoring by half: 12–13, 19–20
Pts: Reyes 12		Pts: Escobar 7

Estadio Nacional de Chile, Santiago

19 March
22:30

Boxscore

Chile	45–35	France
Scoring by half: 19–21, 26–14
Pts: Reyes 24		Pts: Kloeck 13

Estadio Nacional de Chile, Santiago

21 March
21:00

Boxscore

Paraguay	31–41	United States
Scoring by half: 6–21, 25–20
Pts: Escobar 11		Pts: Washington 13

Estadio Nacional de Chile, Santiago

21 March
22:30

Boxscore

Chile	41–37	Brazil
Scoring by half: 25–18, 16–19
Pts: Reyes 17		Pts: Ulbrich 10

Estadio Nacional de Chile, Santiago

22 March
18:30

Boxscore

Paraguay	37–40	Brazil
Scoring by half: 15–20, 22–20
Pts: Bataglia 11		Pts: Ulbrich 10

Estadio Nacional de Chile, Santiago

22 March
19:30

Boxscore

France	48–26	Argentina
Scoring by half: 25–13, 23–13
Pts: Colchen 30		Pts: Pastorino 10

Estadio Nacional de Chile, Santiago

22 March
20:30

Boxscore

Chile	36–49	United States
Scoring by half: 19–26, 17–23
Pts: Hurtado 11		Pts: Bowden 17

Estadio Nacional de Chile, Santiago

== Final standings ==
Rank	Team	Record
1st place, gold medalist(s)	United States	5–1
2nd place, silver medalist(s)	Chile	4–2
3rd place, bronze medalist(s)	France	4–2
4	Brazil	4–2
5	Paraguay	4–5
6	Argentina	2–4
7	Peru	3–3
8	Mexico	2–3
9	Switzerland	1–4
10	Cuba	2–5
