= North Eastern Football League =

Australian rules football competition

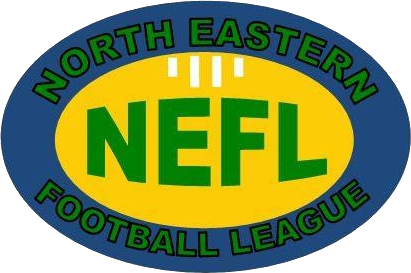
- Formerly: Booborowie & Districts Football Association (1945); North Eastern Football Association (1946-1958)
- Sport: Australian rules football
- Founded: 1945; 81 years ago
- No. of teams: 8
- Country: Australia
- Confederation: SANFL
- Most recent champion: Mintaro-Manoora (7th premiership) (2026)
- Most titles: Booborowie, BSR Tigers (14 premierships)

The North Eastern Football League is an Australian rules football competition based in the Mid North region of South Australia, Australia. It is an affiliated member of the South Australian National Football League.

== Clubs ==
=== Locations ===
Locations of the North East FL clubs

=== Current ===
Club	Jumper	Nickname	Home Ground	Former League	Est.	Years in NEFL	NEFL Senior Premierships	
Club	Jumper	Nickname	Home Ground	Former League	Est.	Years in NEFL	Total	Years
Blyth-Snowtown	(1988–92)(1993-)	Cats	Blyth Oval, Blyth and Snowtown Oval, Snowtown	–	1988	1988-	5	2006, 2007, 2010, 2013, 2019
Brinkworth Spalding Redhill (BSR)		Tigers	Brinkworth Oval, Brinkworth; Spalding Oval, Spalding and Redhill Oval, Redhill	–	1987	1987-	14	1988, 1989, 1990, 1993, 1999, 2000, 2017, 2018, 2020, 2021, 2022, 2023, 2024, 2025
Burra Booborowie Hallett (BBH)	(1986–2019) (2021-)	Rams	Burra Sporting Complex, Burra	–	1986	1986-2019, 2021-	2	2009, 2011
Eudunda-Robertstown		Southern Saints	Eudunda Oval, Eudunda and Robertstown Oval, Robertstown	–	2010	2010-2019, 2021-	0	-
Mintaro Manoora (Min-Man)	(1976–85, 1994–98)(1986–93)(1999–2011) (2012–19)(2020–24) (2025-)	Eagles	Mintaro Oval, Mintaro and Centenary Park, Manoora	MNFL	1969	1976-	7	1977, 1978, 1979, 2004, 2008, 2012, 2026
North Clare	(?-1980)(1980–90)(2000–21)(1991–99, 2022-)	Roosters	Clare Oval, Clare	MNFL	1960	1964-	8	1980, 1981, 1982, 1991, 1992, 1994, 1995, 1997
Riverton Saddleworth Marrabel United (RSMU)		Hawks	Riverton Oval, Riverton	BLGFA	1976	1998-	6	1998, 2001, 2003, 2014, 2015, 2016
South Clare	(1971–84)(1985-)	Demons	Clare Oval, Clare	MNFL	1960	1964-	8	1971, 1972, 1973, 1983, 1986, 1996, 2002, 2005

=== Former ===
Club	Jumper	Nickname	Home Ground	Former League	Est.	Years in NEFL	NEFL Senior Premierships		Fate
Club	Jumper	Nickname	Home Ground	Former League	Est.	Years in NEFL	Total	Years	Fate
Blyth	(1972–80)(1981–87)	Roosters	Blyth Oval, Blyth	BFA	1900	1972-1987	3	1974, 1984, 1987	Merged with Snowtown to form Blyth-Snowtown in 1988
Booborowie			Booborowie Sporting Complex, Booborowie	BFA	1899	1945-1969	14	1946, 1952, 1953, 1954, 1958, 1959, 1961, 1962, 1963, 1964, 1965, 1966, 1967, 1969	Merged with Hallett to form Booborowie-Hallett in 1970
Booborowie-Hallett		Saints	Booborowie Sporting Complex, Booborowie and Hallett Oval, Hallett	–	1970	1970-1985	0	-	Merged with Burra to form Burra-Booborowie-Hallett in 1986
Brinkworth-Yacka		Magpies	Brinkworth Oval, Brinkworth	BFA	1972	1978-1984	0	-	Merged with Spalding to form Brinkworth-Yacka-Spalding in 1985
Brinkworth-Yacka-Spalding		Black Panthers	Brinkworth Oval, Brinkworth; Spalding Oval, Spalding	–	1985	1985-1986	1	1985	Merged with Gulnare-Redhill to form Brinkworth-Spalding-Redhill in 1987
Burra		Eagles	Burra Sporting Complex, Burra	BFA	1879	1945-1985	6	1956, 1960, 1968, 1970, 1975, 1976	Merged with Booborowie-Hallett to form Burra-Booborowie-Hallett in 1986
Eudunda	(1993–99)(2000–09)	Roosters	Eudunda Oval, Eudunda	BLGFA	1893	1992-2009	0	-	Merged with Robertstown to form Eudunda Robertstown in 2010
Gulnare-Redhill	(1979)(1980–86)	Bombers	Redhill Oval, Redhill	BFA	1967	1979-1986	0	-	Merged with Brinkworth-Yacka-Spalding to form Brinkworth-Spalding-Redhill in 1987
Hallett			Hallett Oval, Hallett	BFA	1907	1946-1969	5	1948, 1949, 1950, 1955, 1957	Merged with Booborowie to form Booborowie-Hallett in 1970
Leighton		Black and Golds	Leighton Sports Ground, Leighton	BFA	1940	1945–1946, 1949–1960	0	-	Folded after 1960 season
Snowtown		Double Blues	Snowtown Oval, Snowtown	BFA	1881	1979-1987	0	-	Merged with Blyth to form Blyth-Snowtown in 1988
Spalding	(1945–81)(1982–84)	Panthers	Spalding Oval, Spalding	BFA	1882	1945-1984	2	1945, 1947	Merged with Brinkworth-Yacka to form Brinkworth-Yacka-Spalding in 1985
Terowie		Redlegs	Terowie Oval ("The Quarry"), Terowie	NEFA	1881	1951-1954	1	1951	Returned to North Eastern FA in 1954

== History ==
Burra was one of the earliest country areas playing football on a regular basis, with the first recorded match played in the 1870s. Burra Football Club was formed in 1879 and played their first outside match when they travelled to Clare and were soundly beaten. From then, Burra played regular challenge matches against nearby towns and were known to travel long distances as far as Broken Hill in 1892. Aberdeen and Kooringa both formed clubs in 1891 although there was evidence of them playing each other from 1888.

As the town of Burra grew, more local teams from around the town and district were formed and in April 1905 Aberdeen Football Club sent out invitations to Kooringa and Ramblers Football Clubs inviting them to form an association. The Burra Football Association was formed consisting of Aberdeen, Kooringa and Ramblers. Aberdeen dominated early proceedings, winning premierships in 1905, 1906 1908, 1910, four premierships in succession from 1912 to 1915 and 1921. Kooringa won premierships in 1907, 1909 1919 and 1920, and Ramblers in 1911. By 1911 Farrell Flat, Hallett and Terowie had joined the competition.

The Burra Association reformed in 1919 after World War 1 and included Mount Bryan. There was considerable coming and going and for a time. Booborowie and Booborowie South appeared in 1922, with Booborwie South winning three consecutive premierships from 1922 to 1924. A lack of interest towards football in the Burra district in 1925 forced the Association to fall into recess. Finally in May 1925 with winter approaching, Burra footballers decided they did want to play football after all and formed the Kooringa Football Association. The new Association featured the Aberdeen, Kooringa and Ramblers Clubs.

With the Burra Association going into recess and neighbouring Spalding Association only interested in forming a local association, Booborowie and Booborowie South decided on forming their own association. Originally consisting of North, South and Central Booborowie, it grew to eventually include Spalding in 1929 and Hallett in 1930.

At the 1928 annual general meeting of the Kooringa Association, it was moved to change the name to the Burra Association. However the original Burra Association that existed before the 1925 season still claimed ownership of the title and maintained an elected committee in the hope of resurrecting that association once more. The Burra Football Association title was restored in 1932.

North and South Booborowie amalgamated in 1933 and were successful in applying for entry into the Burra Association. Spalding joined Burra Association in 1934. Booborowie won premiership flags in 1933, 1934, 1935, 1936 and 1939, Kooringa in 1932, 1937 and 1938, and Hallett in 1940.

The Burra Association went into recess after 1940 for World War 2, as was the case in most areas. Football resumed in the area in 1945 under the title Booborowie & Districts Football Association. The founding clubs included Booborowie, Burra, Leighton and Spalding. With Hallett joining a year later in 1946, the association became the North Eastern Football Association. The competition was renamed the North Eastern Football League in 1959.

Terowie joined the competition in 1951, winning the premiership in that year. Terowie's time in the NEFA was brief and they left the competition at the end of the 1954 season.

In 1964 North Clare and South Clare were admitted to the NEFL. This was at a time when Booborowie dominated the competition winning seven successive flags from 1961 to 1967 also taking the 1969 pennant. In 1970 Booborowie and Hallett merged forming Booborowie Hallett FC.

The disbandment of Mid North Football League in 1975 and Broughton Football League in 1980 gave rise to the movements of clubs. In 1972 Blyth became the first of four clubs to leave the Broughton League to join the NEFL during the 1970s. In 1976 Mintaro Manoora had joined the NEFL from the Mid North Football League and they soon tasted success winning three consecutive A Grade flags from 1977 to 1979. Brinkworth Yacka joined in 1977 from the Broughton Football League followed by Gulnare Redhill and Snowtown, both joining in 1979. By 1979 the NEFL had ten clubs in the competition.

The 1980s saw some amalgamations occur. After struggling at the bottom of the ladder for some years Spalding and Brinkworth Yacka joined forces in 1985, to form Brinkworth Yacka Spalding (BYS), winning the A Grade and B Grade flags in this first year. Burra and Booborowie Hallett joined forces in 1986, forming Burra Booborowie Hallett (BBH). In 1987 BYS and Gulnare Redhill amalgamated despite BYS having been formed from an amalgamation only two years previous to form the Brinkworth Spalding Redhill FC (BSR). By 1988 Blyth and Snowtown had decided to join forces forming the Blyth Snowtown FC. By 1988 the NEFL had become a six club competition.

The NEFL welcomed Barossa Light & Gawler Football Association club Eudunda in 1992, followed by Riverton Saddleworth Marrabel United (RSMU) in 1998. RSMU had also left the BLGFA, becoming NEFL Premiers in their inaugural year.

Prior to the 2010 Season, after much speculation, the Eudunda Football Club merged with the Robertstown Football Club from the recently defunct Mid Murray Football Association to become the Southern Saints. The merger was not as promising as expected, with the senior side winless in their debut season.

=== Premierships ===
Year	A Grade (A.L. Collins Memorial Shield)	Reserves (Maurice Vandeleur Shield)	Senior Colts (Under 17) (Old Ashrose Shield)	Junior Colts (Under 14) (Sir Richard Hawker Shield)	Venue
1945	Spalding 7.10 (52) d. Booborowie 7.8 (50)				
1946	Booborowie 9.12 (66) d. Spalding 3.9 (27)				
1947	Spalding 11.11 (77) d. Booborowie 11.10 (76)				
1948	Hallett 13.12 (90) d. Burra 12.12 (84)				
1949	Hallett 9.12 (66) d. Booborowie 9.9 (63)				
1950	Hallett 14.22 (106) d. Burra 11.6 (72)				
1951	Terowie 10.12 (72) d. Hallett 9.8 (62)				
1952	Booborowie 14.11 (95) d. Hallett 12.10 (82)				
1953	Booborowie 9.11 (65) d. Hallett 4.9 (33)				
1954	Booborowie 11.11 (77) d. Hallett 8.6 (54)				
1955	Hallett 12.13 (85) d. Burra 8.8 (56)				
1956	Burra 16.6 (102) d. Hallett 12.15 (87)				
1957	Hallett 5.13 (43) d. Booborowie 2.10 (22)				
1958	Booborowie 12.7 (79) d. Hallett 8.7 (55)				
1959	Booborowie 13.10 (88) d. Burra 7.9 (51)				
1960	Burra 16.7 (103) d. Booborowie 11.17 (83)				
1961	Booborowie 17.16 (118) d. Spalding 9.6 (60)				
1962	Booborowie 13.16 (94) d. Hallett 6.11 (47)	Spalding			
1963	Booborowie 15.25 (115) d. Burra 8.7 (55)	Booborowie			
1964	Booborowie 16.12 (108) d. North Clare 10.17 (77)	Hallett	South Clare		
1965	Booborowie 21.12 (138) d. Burra 9.10 (64)	Spalding	South Clare		
1966	Booborowie 12.11 (83) d. Hallett 8.7 (55)	Burra	South Clare		
1967	Booborowie 14.12 (96) d. Burra 13.6 (84)	South Clare			
1968	Burra 15.4 (104) d. Hallett 13.10 (88)	Burra	South Clare		
1969	Booborowie 9.5 (59) d. Burra 7.12 (54)	Burra	Spalding		
1970	Burra 13.13 (91) d. Booborowie 11.8 (74)	Burra			
1971	South Clare 14.19 (93) d. Burra 15.9 (99)	South Clare	North Clare	South Clare	
1972	South Clare 20.8 (128) d. Booborowie/Hallett 16.21 (117)	North Clare	North Clare		
1973	South Clare 11.18 (84) d. North Clare 10.12 (72)	South Clare	North Clare	South Clare	
1974	Blyth 21.9 (135) d. Burra 15.14 (104)	Blyth	Spalding	Burra	
1975	Burra 20.24 (144) d. South Clare 21.8 (134)	South Clare	Burra	South Clare	
1976	Burra 19.13 (127) d. North Clare 14.9 (93)	Burra	Mintaro/Manoora	Blyth	
1977	Mintaro/Manoora 14.17 (101) d. Burra 13.16 (94)	South Clare	Mintaro/Manoora	Booborowie/Hallett	
1978	Mintaro/Manoora 17.19 (121) d. Booborowie/Hallett 11.7 (73)	Burra	South Clare	North Clare	
1979	Mintaro/Manoora 16.17 (113) d. Booborowie/Hallett 11.12 (78)	Brinkworth	North Clare	North Clare	
1980	North Clare 17.9 (111) d. Burra 12.9 (81)	South Clare	North Clare		
1981	North Clare 12.13 (85) d. South Clare 9.12 (66)	North Clare	North Clare	North Clare	
1982	North Clare 16.11 (107) d. South Clare 10.13 (73)	South Clare	North Clare	North Clare	
1983	South Clare 17.14 (116) d. Blyth 13.8 (86)	Blyth	Booborowie/Hallett	South Clare	
1984	Blyth 20.20 (140) d. South Clare 8.12 (50)	Blyth	Booborowie/Hallett	North Clare	
1985	Brinkworth/Yacka/Spalding 21.12 (138) d. South Clare 19.13 (127)	Brinkworth/Yacka/Spalding	Booborowie/Hallett	North Clare	
1986	South Clare 18.13 (121) d. Blyth 15.4 (94)	BBH Rams	BBH Rams	North Clare	
1987	Blyth 9.9 (63) d. North Clare 8.7 (55)	BSR Tigers	North Clare	North Clare	
1988	BSR Tigers 9.10 (64) d. BBH Rams 7.10 (52)	North Clare	North Clare	North Clare	
1989	BSR Tigers 16.16 (112) d. North Clare 11.7 (73)	North Clare	North Clare	Blyth/Snowtown	
1990	BSR Tigers 17.18 (120) d. Blyth/Snowtown 7.15 (57)	North Clare	BSR Tigers	South Clare	
1991	North Clare 23.10 (148) d. Blyth/Snowtown 15.10 (100)	North Clare	BSR Tigers	South Clare	
1992	North Clare 23.14 (152) d. BSR Tigers 14.11 (95)	North Clare	South Clare	Blyth/Snowtown	
1993	BSR Tigers 13.15 (93) d. South Clare 11.16 (82)	BSR Tigers	South Clare	BBH Rams	
1994	North Clare 17.14 (116) d. Eudunda 6.10 (46)	North Clare	North Clare	South Clare	
1995	North Clare 11.12 (78) d. BSR Tigers 7.11 (53)	North Clare	South Clare	BSR Tigers	
1996	South Clare 23.13 (151) d. Mintaro/Manoora 6.11 (47)	North Clare	BBH Rams	Eudunda	
1997	North Clare 13.10 (88) d. South Clare 12.10 (82)	Eudunda	Blyth/Snowtown	South Clare	
1998	RSMU Hawks 14.7 (91) d. BSR Tigers 7.12 (54)	RSMU Hawks	Eudunda	RSMU Hawks	
1999	BSR Tigers 21.18 (144) d. South Clare 6.6 (42)	South Clare	South Clare	BBH Rams	
2000	BSR Tigers 17.9 (111) d. South Clare 16.6 (102)	RSMU Hawks	South Clare	South Clare	
2001	RSMU Hawks 16.13 (109) d. South Clare 12.12 (84)	South Clare	RSMU Hawks	RSMU Hawks	
2002	South Clare 10.12 (72) d. BSR Tigers 8.14 (62)	BSR Tigers	Blyth/Snowtown	BBH Rams	
2003	RSMU Hawks 18.12 (120) d. Mintaro/Manoora 18.10 (118)	North Clare	South Clare	South Clare	
2004	Mintaro/Manoora 19.19 (133) d. Blyth/Snowtown 12.6 (78)	BSR Tigers	Mintaro/Manoora	RSMU Hawks	
2005	South Clare 17.13 (115) d. Mintaro/Manoora 11.11 (87)	South Clare	Mintaro/Manoora	RSMU Hawks	Mintaro
2006	Blyth/Snowtown 21.11 (137) d. South Clare 13.9 (87)	North Clare	South Clare	RSMU Hawks	Clare
2007	Blyth/Snowtown 12.9 (81) d. Mintaro/Manoora 8.12 (60)	Blyth/Snowtown	Mintaro/Manoora	RSMU Hawks	Blyth
2008	Mintaro/Manoora 14.8 (92) d. RSMU Hawks 9.4 (58)	North Clare	RSMU Hawks	Eudunda	Redhill
2009	BBH Rams 10.17 (77) d. Blyth/Snowtown 7.8 (50	Mintaro/Manoora	RSMU Hawks	South Clare	Riverton
2010	Blyth/Snowtown 17.11 (113) d. Mintaro/Manoora 16.11 (107)	RSMU Hawks 6.3 (39) d. Mintaro/Manoora 4.13 (37)	Southern Saints 8.14 (62) d. RSMU 7.7 (49)	BSR Tigers 8.9 (57) d. Southern Saints 1.1 (7)	Clare
2011	BBH Rams 10.12 (72) d. Blyth/Snowtown 8.10 (58)	Southern Saints 7.8 (50) d. RSMU Hawks 4.10 (34)	Southern Saints 15.18 (108) d. BSR Tigers 3.6 (24)	North Clare 9.12 (66) d. BSR Tigers 4.5 (29)	Burra
2012	Mintaro/Manoora 15.14 (104) d. RSMU Hawks 9.13 (67)	Southern Saints 10.11 (71) d. Blyth/Snowtown 7.5 (47)	Southern Saints 7.11 (53) d. RSMU Hawks 7.8 (50)	BSR Tigers 8.6 (54) d. RSMU Hawks 7.8 (50)	Eudunda
2013	Blyth/Snowtown 13.12 (90) d. Mintaro/Manoora 7.14 (56)	BSR Tigers 8.8 (56) d. RSMU Hawks 6.13 (49)	BSR Tigers 13.13 (91) d. North Clare 7.10 (52)	Southern Saints 4.4 (28) d. South Clare 1.3 (9)	Mintaro
2014	RSMU Hawks 12.9 (81) d. Southern Saints 7.6 (48)	Blyth/Snowtown 13.4 (82) d. South Clare 7.9 (51)	North Clare 14.11 (95) d. South Clare 9.7 (61)	North Clare 9.11 (65) d. Southern Saints 4.1 (25)	Clare
2015	RSMU Hawks 14.13 (97) d. Southern Saints 8.15 (63)	Southern Saints 9.6 (60) d. South Clare 3.12 (30)	RSMU Hawks 11.15 (81) d. North Clare 8.7 (55)	South Clare 20.7 (127) d. Mintaro/Manoora 5.8 (38)	Snowtown
2016	RSMU Hawks 10.25 (85) d. Mintaro/Manoora 3.3 (21)	Southern Saints 15.10 (100) d. Blyth Snowtown 6.4 (40)	South Clare 14.10 (94) d. Mintaro/Manoora 9.8 (62)	Southern Saints 7.6 (48) d. RSMU Hawks 5.2 (32)	Brinkworth
2017	BSR Tigers 7.11 (53) d. RSMU Hawks 8.4 (52)	BSR Tigers 8.10 (58) d. South Clare 4.6 (30)	South Clare 9.9 (63) d. North Clare 8.10 (58)	Mintaro/Manoora 5.5 (35) d. North Clare 3.4 (22)	Riverton
2018	BSR Tigers 8.10 (58) d. Blyth/Snowtown 4.7 (31)	BSR Tigers 11.9 (75) d. BBH Rams 4.3 (27)	Southern Saints 11.5 (71) d. RSMU Hawks 5.7 (37)	North Clare 9.6 (60) d. Minatro/Manoora 0.5 (5)	Clare
2019	Blyth/Snowtown 7.4 (46) d. BSR Tigers 4.11 (35)	BSR Tigers 7.12 (54) d. Blyth/Snowtown 5.3 (33)	Southern Saints 12.6 (78) d. Mintaro/Manoora 6.5 (41)	North Clare 7.8 (50) d. Blyth/Snowtown 0.1 (1)	Burra
2020	BSR Tigers 10.12 (82) d. South Clare 9.4 (58)	BSR Tigers 5.4 (34) d. North Clare 4.8 (32)	Mintaro/Manoora 9.13 (67) d. North Clare 4.0 (24)	North Clare 6.6 (42) d. Mintaro/Manoora 5.1 (31)	Clare
2021	BSR Tigers 11.11 (77) d. RSMU Hawks 6.6 (42)	Southern Saints 8.9 (57) d. BBH Rams 7.6 (48)	Mintaro/Manoora 7.6 (48) d. North Clare 6.7 (43)	Mintaro/Manoora 10.6 (66) d. South Clare 2.3 (15)	Eudunda
2022	BSR Tigers 15.4 (94) d. Mintaro/Manoora 9.10 (64)	Blyth/Snowtown 6.9 (45) d. BSR Tigers 5.9 (39)	Mintaro/Manoora 12.14 (86) d. North Clare 8.4 (52)	Mintaro/Manoora 13.11 (89) d. North Clare 1.2 (8)	Mintaro
2023	BSR Tigers 10.15 (75) d. Southern Saints 4.7 (31)	BSR Tigers 10.9 (69) d. South Clare 6.9 (45)	South Clare 7.4 (46) d. Mintaro/Manoora 4.15 (39)	North Clare 8.9 (57) d. Mintaro/Manoora 7.3 (45)	Clare
2024	BSR Tigers 10.5 (65) d. Southern Saints 5.7 (37)	Southern Saints 16.8 (104) d. South Clare 4.9 (33)	South Clare 14.11 (95) d. North Clare 6.7 (43)	Blyth/Snowtown 5.5 (35) d. RSMU Hawks 1.5 (11)	Blyth
2025	BSR Tigers 10.11 (71) d. Mintaro/Manoora 8.11 (59)	Mintaro/Manoora 10.9 (69) d. BSR Tigers 9.10 (64)	North Clare 12.5 (77) d. Mintaro/Manoora 11.9 (75)	BBH Rams 16.13 (109) d. BSR Tigers 3.2 (20)	Spalding
2026	Mintaro/Manoora 18.16 (124) d. BSR Tigers10.7 (67)	Blyth/Snowtown 6.13 (49) d. BSR Tigers 4.8 (32)	Mintaro/Manoora 12.9 (81) d. BSR Tigers 4.9 (41)	Mintaro/Manoora 6.9 (45) d. Blyth/Snowtown 5.5 (35)	Riverton

=== Mail Medalists ===
Year	A Grade Mail Medalist	Club	A Grade Runner Up	Club	Reserves Best and Fairest	Club
1949	Ron Thompson	Booborowie	Gordon Collins	Spalding		
1950	Ray James	Burra	Ron Thompson	Booborowie		
1951	Ray James	Burra	Nick Burton	Terowie		
1952	Dave Edwards	Burra	Colin Hancock	Spalding		
1953	Frank Cousins	Booborowie	Cletis Furst	Hallett		
1954	Frank Cousins	Booborowie	Kevin Kleinig	Leighton		
1955	Ray James	Burra	Kevin Cousins	Booborowie		
1956	Keith Warrior	Hallett	Kevin Cousins	Booborowie		
1957	Joe Furst Kevin Cousins	Hallett Booborowie				
1958	Kevin Cousins	Booborowie	Kevin Lawrence	Leighton		
1959	Frank Cousins	Spalding	John Dewhirst	Booborowie		
1960	Don Lloyd	Leighton	Peter Sullivan	Booborowie		
1961	Keith Warrior	Hallett	John Dewhirst	Booborowie		
1962	Mike Brooks	Hallett	Keith Warrior	Hallett		
1963	Don Villis	Burra	Barry Eberhand	Burra	R James	Burra
1964	Kevin Cousins	Booborowie	Kevin Coulter	North Clare	R James	Burra
1965	Don Villis	Booborowie	Rex Smith	South Clare	C Borlace	South Clare
1966	Barry Eberhand	Burra	Don Villis	Booborowie	Roger Sanders	South Clare
1967	Barry Eberhand	Burra	Don Villis	Booborowie	R Brandt	Burra
1968	Don Villis	Booborowie	Barry Eberhand	Burra	Don Coulter	North Clare
1969	Barry Eberhand	Burra	Don Villis	Booborowie	A Day	Burra
1970	Russell Nicholls	Burra	Brendon Kluska	South Clare	Roger Sanders	South Clare
1971	Darryl Field	Burra	Rob Ashby	Hallett	M Allen	Burra
1972	Ian Roberts	Blyth	Paul McCarthy	South Clare	M Allen	Burra
1973	Don Sommerville	North Clare	Mike Wanganeen	Blyth	Jim Jolly	South Clare
1974	Brendon Kluska Ian Roberts	South Clare Blyth	Don Sommerville	North Clare	Ken May	North Clare
1975	John Wallace	South Clare	Mike Wanganeen	Blyth	C Hall	Booborowie/Hallett
1976	Don Sommerville	North Clare	Ian Roberts	Blyth	C Hall	Booborowie/Hallett
1977	Ian Roberts	Blyth	Don Sommerville	North Clare	C Hall	Booborowie/Hallett
1978	Lyall Ackland Colin Baker	Mintaro/Manoora Burra	Ian Roberts	Blyth	B Weckert	Brinkworth/Yacka
1979	Peter Vandeleur	South Clare	Lyall Ackland	Mintaro/Manoora	I Burgess	Gulnare/Redhill
1980	Ashley Smart Peter Vandeleur	North Clare South Clare	Bruce Hicks Colin Baker	Burra Booborowie/Hallett	S Taylor	Burra
1981	Ian Roberts Neville Wilsden	Blyth Spalding	Peter Vandeleur	South Clare	Lindsay Victor	North Clare
1982	Robbie Olsen	Blyth	David Pearce	North Clare	Steve Jolly	South Clare
1983	John Redden Peter Kelly Chris Guthrie	Burra Gulnare/Redhill Booborowie/Hallett			L James	Burra
1984	Daryl Andriske	Blyth	Tony Brooks	Booborowie/Hallett	A Clark	Blyth
1985	Chris Guthrie	Booborowie/Hallett	David Smith	South Clare	Gary Tiss J Burgess	North Clare Gulnare/Redhill
1986	David Smith	South Clare	Dennis Weckert	Brinkworth/Yacka/Spalding	R Possingham	North Clare
1987	David Smith	South Clare	Michael Soulsby	BBH Rams	N Page	BBH Rams
1988	Peter Cook	North Clare	Andrew Jaeschke	North Clare	D Willmott	Mintaro/Manoora
1989	Dennis Weckert	BSR Tigers	David Smith	South Clare	Rodney Mitchell	North Clare
1990	Dennis Weckert	BSR Tigers	Peter Cook	North Clare	Gary Zweck	Blyth/Snowtown
1991	Mark Kemp Tony Brooks	North Clare BBH Rams	Darren Longbottom	BSR Tigers	Rodney Mitchell	North Clare
1992	Mark Kemp	North Clare	Dennis Weckert	BSR Tigers	Rodney Mitchell	North Clare
1993	Rob Stephens	BBH Rams	David Smith	South Clare	T Ashby	BSR Tigers
1994	Ashley Nicholls	Mintaro/Manoora	David Smith	South Clare	Scott Willis	North Clare
1995	Brett Matthews	Blyth/Snowtown	Matt Scott	Mintaro/Manoora	David Kuss	North Clare
1996	Dennis Weckert	BSR Tigers	Daniel Ross	Mintaro/Manoora	Mick Fisher	South Clare
1997	David Smith	South Clare	Jarrod Courtney	South Clare	A Schiller	Eudunda
1998	Craig Griffiths	RSMU Hawks	Dennis Weckert	BSR Tigers	D Clook Rickey Clark	Mintaro/Manoora Blyth/Snowtown
1999	David Smith	South Clare	Jason Branson	RSMU Hawks	D Prior	Eudunda
2000	Kym Eyers	BSR Tigers	Don Williams	RSMU Hawks	S Ball	RSMU Hawks
2001	Ian Phillips	BSR Tigers	Brad Nordhausen	South Clare	Ben Otterspoor	South Clare
2002	Kimberley Hart	RSMU Hawks	Brad Nordhausen	South Clare	John Nickolai	North Clare
2003	Luke Hocking	Mintaro/Manoora	Jason Degabrielle	Blyth/Snowtown	Jamie Clapp	BSR Tigers
2004	Steve Baraglia	Mintaro/Manoora	Kimberley Hart	RSMU Hawks	D Benson	BSR Tigers
2005	Ric Giles	BBH Rams	James Slattery	Mintaro/Manoora	Kerry Warner	Blyth/Snowtown
2006	Sam Schmidt	Mintaro/Manoora	Ryan Darling	Blyth/Snowtown	Jamie Van Den Ham	Eudunda
2007	Ryan McDermid	Mintaro/Manoora	Kimberly Hart	RSMU Hawks	Shayne Wilmott	RSMU Hawks
2008	Andrew Purchase	BBH Rams	Ryan McDermid	Mintaro/Manoora	Phillip Bigg	Blyth/Snowtown
2009	Ryan Darling	Blyth/Snowtown	Aaron Spicer	BBH Rams	Scott Camilleri	Mintaro/Manoora
2010	Brodie Murphy	South Clare	Ryan Darling	Blyth/Snowtown	Paul Meyer Jake Nicholls	BSR Tigers Mintaro/Manoora
2011	Zack Hier	RSMU Hawks	Ryan Darling	Blyth/Snowtown	Barry Sweetman	North Clare
2012	Ryan Darling	Blyth/Snowtown	William Sandow Zack Hier	Mintaro/Manoora RSMU Hawks	Stephen Giester	Southern Saints
2013	Marcus Hall	BBH Rams	Ryan McDermid	Mintaro/Manoora	Stephen Tohl	BBH Rams
2014	James Vandeleur	RSMU Hawks	Rowan Prior	Southern Saints	Tim Siv	North Clare
2015	Clinton Voigt	Southern Saints	Sam Heinjus	BSR Tigers	Alex Smart	BSR Tigers
2016	Sam Heinjus	BSR Tigers	Caleb Lloyd	Blyth/Snowtown	Michael Young	Mintaro/Manoora
2017	Patrick Clark	RSMU Hawks	Gareth Ottens	Blyth/Snowtown	Kimberley Hart	RSMU Hawks
2018	Gareth Ottens	Blyth/Snowtown	Justin Schahinger	RSMU Hawks	Matthew Norman	RSMU Hawks
2019	Caleb Lloyd	Blyth/Snowtown	Justin Schahinger William Sandow Matthew Allen Matthew Longbottom	RSMU Hawks Mintaro/Manoora South Clare BSR Tigers	Scott Kuerschner	North Clare
2020	William Sandow	Mintaro/Manoora	Jack Haarsma	BSR Tigers	Brodie Paige	North Clare
2021	Matthew Longbottom	BSR Tigers	Blake Launer	Southern Saints	William Jenner	Mintaro/Manoora
2022	Charles Riggs	Mintaro/Manoora	Alex Morgan William Pratt Chris Schmidt	BSR Tigers Blyth/Snowtown Southern Saints	Adam MacKenzie	BSR Tigers
2023	Alex Morgan	BSR Tigers	William Sandow	Mintaro/Manoora	Casey Cooper	BBH Rams
2024	Blake Launer	Southern Saints	Matthew Longbottom	BSR Tigers	Gareth Ottens	Blyth/Snowtown
2025	Matthew Longbottom	BSR Tigers	Ryan Bruce	RSMU Hawks	Casey Cooper Henry Durrant	BBH Rams BSR Tigers
2026	Ryan Bruce	RSMU Hawks	Matthew Longbottom	BSR Tigers	Archie Smith	North Clare

== Notable players From NEFL ==
BBH Rams

- Scott Lycett

BSR Tigers

- Jack Hayes

Mintaro/Manoora

- Nick Smith
- Harry Schoenberg
- Charlie Nicholls

South Clare

- Luke Dunstan
- Riley Knight
- Lachlan McNeil

== 2006 Ladder ==
North Eastern	Wins	Byes	Losses	Draws	For	Against	%	Pts	Final	Team	G	B	Pts	Team	G	B	Pts
Blyth/Snowtown	14	0	3	0	1904	1000	65.56%	28	1st Semi	Mintaro/Manoora	18	12	120	RSMU Hawks	9	6	60
South Clare	14	0	3	0	1933	1030	65.24%	28	2nd Semi	South Clare	17	9	111	Blyth/Snowtown	10	7	67
Mintaro/Manoora	12	0	4	1	1744	1087	61.60%	25	Preliminary	Blyth/Snowtown	15	5	95	Mintaro/Manoora	8	15	63
RSMU Hawks	7	0	10	0	1270	1702	42.73%	14	Grand	Blyth/Snowtown	21	11	137	South Clare	13	9	87
BSR Tigers	6	0	10	1	1217	1835	39.88%	13									
North Clare	6	0	10	1	1209	1528	44.17%	13									
Eudunda	6	0	11	0	1505	1518	49.78%	12									
BBH Rams	1	0	15	1	1058	2140	33.08%	3									

== 2007 Ladder ==
North Eastern	Wins	Byes	Losses	Draws	For	Against	%	Pts	Final	Team	G	B	Pts	Team	G	B	Pts
Blyth/Snowtown	14	0	4	0	1997	1344	59.77%	28	1st Semi	Mintaro/Manoora	12	13	85	South Clare	9	9	63
RSMU Hawks	13	0	5	0	1659	1109	59.93%	26	2nd Semi	Blyth/Snowtown	16	7	103	RSMU Hawks	8	7	55
Mintaro/Manoora	12	0	6	0	1897	1131	62.65%	24	Preliminary	Mintaro/Manoora	18	14	122	RSMU Hawks	9	9	63
South Clare	12	0	6	0	1731	1724	50.10%	24	Grand	Blyth/Snowtown	12	9	81	Mintaro/Manoora	8	12	60
Eudunda	10	0	8	0	1542	1563	49.66%	20									
BBH Rams	5	0	13	0	1542	1854	45.41%	10									
BSR Tigers	3	0	15	0	1344	2068	39.39%	6									
North Clare	3	0	15	0	1164	2083	35.85%	6									

== 2008 Ladder ==
North Eastern	Wins	Byes	Losses	Draws	For	Against	%	Pts	Final	Team	G	B	Pts	Team	G	B	Pts
Mintaro/Manoora	15	0	2	0	1685	904	65.08%	30	1st Semi	RSMU Hawks	20	9	129	North Clare	12	1	73
Blyth/Snowtown	11	0	6	0	1673	1225	57.73%	22	2nd Semi	Mintaro/Manoora	11	8	74	Blyth/Snowtown	9	8	62
North Clare	11	0	6	0	1463	1474	49.81%	22	Preliminary	RSMU Hawks	16	15	111	Blyth/Snowtown	10	5	65
RSMU Hawks	10	0	7	0	1737	1106	61.10%	20	Grand	Mintaro/Manoora	14	8	92	RSMU	9	4	58
BBH Rams	10	0	7	0	1478	1270	53.78%	20									
South Clare	8	0	9	0	1282	1475	46.50%	16									
BSR Tigers	3	0	14	0	977	1632	37.45%	6									
Eudunda	0	0	17	0	866	2075	29.45%	0									

== 2009 Ladder ==
North Eastern	Wins	Byes	Losses	Draws	For	Against	%	Pts	Final	Team	G	B	Pts	Team	G	B	Pts
BBH Rams	16	0	1	0	1814	1030	63.78%	32	1st Semi	Blyth/Snowtown	15	16	106	RSMU Hawks	10	13	73
Mintaro/Manoora	14	0	3	0	1672	946	63.87%	28	2nd Semi	BBH Rams	23	9	147	Mintaro/Manoora	10	6	66
Blyth/Snowtown	11	0	6	0	1601	1216	56.83%	22	Preliminary	Blyth/Snowtown	20	15	135	Mintaro/Manoora	15	9	99
RSMU Hawks	9	0	8	0	1403	1272	52.45%	18	Grand	BBH Rams	10	17	77	Blyth/Snowtown	7	8	50
North Clare	8	0	9	0	1398	1415	49.70%	16									
South Clare	7	0	10	0	1164	1422	45.01%	14									
Eudunda	2	0	15	0	948	1608	37.09%	4									
BSR Tigers	1	0	16	0	852	1943	30.48%	2									

== 2010 Ladder ==
North Eastern	Wins	Byes	Losses	Draws	For	Against	%	Pts	Final	Team	G	B	Pts	Team	G	B	Pts
Blyth/Snowtown	15	0	3	0	2075	1063	66.12%	30	1st Semi	BBH Rams	11	12	78	RSMU Hawks	12	4	76
Mintaro/Manoora	15	0	3	0	1761	1108	61.38%	30	2nd Semi	Mintaro/Manoora	1	5	11	Blyth/Snowtown	0	5	5
RSMU Hawks	13	0	5	0	1486	988	60.06%	26	Preliminary	Blyth/Snowtown	15	12	102	BBH Rams	12	13	85
BBH Rams	10	0	8	0	1551	1452	51.65%	20	Grand	Blyth/Snowtown	17	11	113	Mintaro/Manoora	16	11	107
North Clare	9	0	9	0	1425	1478	49.09%	18									
South Clare	7	0	11	0	1541	1468	51.21%	14									
BSR Tigers	3	0	15	0	889	1905	31.82%	6									
Eudunda/Robertson	0	0	18	0	930	2196	29.75%	0									

== 2011 Ladder ==
North Eastern	Wins	Byes	Losses	Draws	For	Against	%	Pts	Final	Team	G	B	Pts	Team	G	B	Pts
Blyth/Snowtown	17	0	0	0	1942	954	67.06%	34	1st Semi	Mintaro/Manoora	15	9	99	RSMU Hawks	12	6	78
BBH Rams	13	0	4	0	1674	948	63.84%	26	2nd Semi	BBH Rams	16	9	105	Blyth/Snowtown	11	6	72
Mintaro/Manoora	12	0	5	0	1614	1175	57.87%	24	Preliminary	Blyth/Snowtown	10	11	71	Mintaro/Manoora	5	3	33
RSMU Hawks	9	0	8	0	1355	1287	51.29%	18	Grand	BBH Rams	10	12	72	Blyth/Snowtown	8	10	58
Eudunda/Robertson	8	0	9	0	1452	1526	48.76%	16									
South Clare	7	0	10	0	1088	1738	38.50%	14									
North Clare	1	0	16	0	1060	1834	36.63%	2									
BSR Tigers	1	0	16	0	962	1685	36.34%	2									

== 2012 Ladder ==
North Eastern	Wins	Byes	Losses	Draws	For	Against	%	Pts	Final	Team	G	B	Pts	Team	G	B	Pts
Mintaro/Manoora	15	0	3	0	1936	1064	64.53%	30	1st Semi	Blyth/Snowtown	18	11	119	BBH Rams	14	10	94
RSMU Hawks	14	0	3	1	1835	1235	59.77%	29	2nd Semi	Mintaro/Manoora	14	12	96	RSMU Hawks	10	11	71
BBH Rams	12	0	5	1	1749	1354	56.36%	25	Preliminary	RSMU Hawks	23	7	145	Blyth/Snowtown	13	17	95
Blyth/Snowtown	12	0	6	0	1681	1184	58.67%	24	Grand	Mintaro/Manoora	15	14	104	RSMU Hawks	9	13	67
South Clare	8	0	10	0	1370	1467	48.29%	16									
North Clare	4	0	14	0	1082	1900	36.28%	8									
Eudunda/Robertson	3	0	15	0	1245	1811	40.74%	6									
BSR Tigers	3	0	15	0	1077	1960	35.46%	6									

== 2013 Ladder ==
North Eastern	Wins	Byes	Losses	Draws	For	Against	%	Pts	Final	Team	G	B	Pts	Team	G	B	Pts
RSMUHawks	13	0	3	0	1401	862	61.91%	26	1st Semi	Mintaro/Manoora	16	16	112	South Clare	8	7	55
Blyth/Snowtown	13	0	3	0	1744	825	67.89%	26	2nd Semi	Blyth/Snowtown	13	10	88	RSMU Hawks	9	7	61
South Clare	12	0	4	0	1371	1017	57.41%	24	Preliminary	RSMU Hawks	14	9	93	Mintaro/Manoora	11	6	72
Mintaro/Manoora	10	0	6	0	1410	903	60.96%	20	Grand	Blyth/Snowtown	13	12	90	Mintaro/Manoora	7	14	56
BBH Rams	6	0	10	0	1069	1443	42.56%	12									
Eudunda/Robertson	5	0	11	0	1031	1301	44.21%	10									
BSR Tigers	4	0	12	0	941	1495	38.63%	8									
North Clare	1	0	15	0	684	1805	27.48%	2									

== 2014 Ladder ==
North Eastern	Wins	Byes	Losses	Draws	For	Against	%	Pts	Final	Team	G	B	Pts	Team	G	B	Pts
RSMU Hawks	15	0	1	0	1641	700	70.10%	30	1st Semi	Eudunda/Robertson	18	13	121	Blyth/Snowtown	14	5	89
Mintaro/Manoora	13	0	3	0	1363	1021	57.17%	26	2nd Semi	RSMU Hawks	12	9	81	Mintaro/Manoora	9	11	65
Blyth/Snowtown	11	0	5	0	1425	1052	57.53%	22	Preliminary	Eudunda/Robertson	15	6	96	Mintaro/Manoora	9	12	66
Eudunda/Robertson	8	0	8	0	1372	1223	52.87%	16	Grand	RSMU Hawks	12	9	81	Eudunda/Robertson	7	6	48
North Clare	5	0	11	0	1233	1750	41.33%	10									
BSR Tigers	5	0	11	0	1085	1723	38.64%	10									
BBH Rams	4	0	12	0	1130	1572	41.82%	8									
South Clare	3	0	13	0	1214	1422	46.05%	6									

== 2015 Ladder ==
North Eastern	Wins	Byes	Losses	Draws	For	Against	%	Pts	Final	Team	G	B	Pts	Team	G	B	Pts
RSMU Hawks	15	0	1	0	1641	649	71.66%	30	1st Semi	Eudunda/Robertson	18	13	121	Blyth/Snowtown	14	5	89
Mintaro/Manoora	13	0	3	0	1363	1021	57.17%	26	2nd Semi	RSMU Hawks	12	9	81	Mintaro/Manoora	9	11	65
Blyth/Snowtown	11	0	5	0	1426	1097	56.52%	22	Preliminary	Eudunda/Robertson	15	6	96	Mintaro/Manoora	9	12	66
Eudunda/Robertson	8	0	8	0	1372	1223	52.87%	16	Grand	RSMU Hawks	12	9	81	Eudunda/Robertson	7	6	48
North Clare	5	0	11	0	1233	1750	41.33%	10									
BSR Tigers	5	0	11	0	1079	1723	38.51%	10									
BBH Rams	4	0	12	0	1130	1573	41.81%	8									
South Clare	3	0	13	0	1214	1422	46.05%	6									

== 2016 Ladder ==
North Eastern	Wins	Byes	Losses	Draws	For	Against	%	Pts	Final	Team	G	B	Pts	Team	G	B	Pts
RSMU Hawks	16	0	0	0	1998	771	72.16%	32	1st Semi	Mintaro/Manoora	18	10	118	Blyth/Snowtown	15	11	101
Southern Saints	11	0	5	0	1534	1054	59.27%	22	2nd Semi	RSMU Hawks	16	14	110	Southern Saints	6	13	49
Mintaro/Manoora	11	0	5	0	1418	1143	55.37%	22	Preliminary	Mintaro/Manoora	12	9	81	Southern Saints	11	6	72
Blyth/Snowtown	10	0	6	0	1296	1143	53.14%	20	Grand	RSMU Hawks	10	25	85	Mintaro/Manoora	3	3	21
South Clare	7	0	9	0	1408	1388	50.36%	14									
BBH Rams	4	0	12	0	891	1542	36.62%	8									
BSR Tigers	3	0	13	0	875	1678	34.27%	6									
North Clare	2	0	14	0	909	1610	36.09%	4									

== 2017 Ladder ==
North Eastern	Wins	Byes	Losses	Draws	For	Against	%	Pts	Final	Team	G	B	Pts	Team	G	B	Pts
RSMU Hawks	16	0	1	0	2044	678	75.09%	32	1st Semi	South Clare	16	15	111	North Clare	10	6	66
BSR Tigers	16	0	1	0	1623	800	66.98%	32	2nd Semi	RSMU Hawks	10	11	71	BSR Tigers	7	8	50
South Clare	9	0	8	0	1385	1323	51.14%	18	Preliminary	BSR Tigers	16	12	108	South Clare	6	5	41
North Clare	8	0	9	0	1466	1386	51.40%	16	Grand	BSR Tigers	7	11	53	RSMU Hawks	8	4	52
Blyth/Snowtown	7	0	10	0	1053	1222	46.29%	14									
BBH Rams	5	0	12	0	886	1672	34.64%	10									
Mintaro/Manoora	4	0	13	0	899	1793	33.40%	8									
Southern Saints	3	0	14	0	1081	1563	40.89%	6									

== 2018 Ladder ==
North Eastern	Wins	Byes	Losses	Draws	For	Against	%	Pts	Final	Team	G	B	Pts	Team	G	B	Pts
BSR Tigers	15	0	2	0	1814	584	75.65%	30	1st Semi	RSMU Hawks	18	12	120	North Clare	10	5	65
Blyth/Snowtown	14	0	3	0	1698	717	70.31%	28	2nd Semi	BSR Tigers	15	2	92	Blyth/Snowtown	6	7	43
RSMU Hawks	13	0	4	0	1431	963	59.77%	26	Preliminary	Blyth/Snowtown	12	12	84	RSMU Hawks	8	5	53
North Clare	9	0	8	0	1429	1318	52.02%	18	Grand	BSR Tigers	8	10	58	Blyth/Snowtown	4	7	31
South Clare	6	0	11	0	1129	1489	43.12%	12									
BBH Rams	6	0	11	0	1038	1450	41.72%	12									
Southern Saints	4	0	13	0	854	1681	33.69%	8									
Mintaro/Manoora	1	0	16	0	735	1926	27.62%	2									

== 2019 Ladder ==
North Eastern	Wins	Byes	Losses	Draws	For	Against	%	Pts	Final	Team	G	B	Pts	Team	G	B	Pts
Blyth/Snowtown	13	0	3	0	1379	721	65.67%	26	1st Semi	BSR	12	17	89	North Clare	9	11	65
South Clare	11	0	5	0	1389	893	60.87%	22	2nd Semi	Blyth/Snowtown	15	6	96	South Clare	12	5	77
BSR Tigers	11	0	5	0	1330	912	59.32%	22	Preliminary	BSR Tigers	12	7	89	South Clare	5	6	36
North Clare	10	0	6	0	1397	1145	54.96%	20	Grand	Blyth/Snowtown	7	4	46	BSR Tigers	4	11	35
RSMU Hawks	9	0	7	0	1280	1106	53.65%	18									
Southern Saints	8	0	8	0	1012	1181	46.15%	16									
BBH Rams	1	0	15	0	720	1580	31.30%	2									
Mintaro/Manoora	1	0	15	0	654	1623	28.72%	2									

== 2020 Ladder ==
North Eastern	Wins	Byes	Losses	Draws	For	Against	%	Pts	Final	Team	G	B	Pts	Team	G	B	Pts
BSR Tigers	8	0	2	0	825	497	72.41%	16	1st Semi	Mintaro/Manoora	12	5	77	RSMU Hawks	8	10	58
South Clare	6	0	4	0	789	621	55.96%	12	2nd Semi	BSR Tigers	18	12	120	South Clare	6	6	42
RSMU Hawks	6	0	4	0	727	633	53.46%	12	Preliminary	South Clare	6	16	52	Mintaro/Manoora	4	8	32
Mintaro/Manoora	6	0	4	0	621	690	47.37%	12	Grand	BSR Tigers	12	10	82	South Clare	9	4	58
Blyth/Snowtown	3	0	7	0	546	769	41.52%	6									
North Clare	1	0	9	0	468	766	37.93%	2									

== 2021 Ladder ==
North Eastern	Wins	Byes	Losses	Draws	For	Against	%	Pts	Final	Team	G	B	Pts	Team	G	B	Pts
Southern Saints	11	0	2	1	1368	661	67.42%	23	1st Semi	RSMU Hawks	6	8	44	Mintaro/Manoora	6	7	43
BSR Tigers	11	0	2	1	1324	670	66.40%	23	2nd Semi	BSR Tigers	11	7	73	Southern Saints	5	5	35
RSMU Hawks	10	0	4	0	1266	872	59.21%	20	Preliminary	RSMU Hawks	11	7	73	Southern Saints	9	9	63
Mintaro/Manoora	8	0	6	0	944	777	56.13%	16	Grand	BSR Tigers	11	11	77	RSMU Hawks	6	6	42
North Clare	6	0	8	0	969	1132	46.12%	14									
Blyth/Snowtown	5	0	9	0	874	1225	41.64%	10									
BBH Rams	3	0	11	0	806	1531	34.49%	6									
South Clare	1	0	13	0	766	1499	43.82%	2									

== 2022 Ladder ==
North Eastern	Wins	Byes	Losses	Draws	For	Against	%	Pts	Final	Team	G	B	Pts	Team	G	B	Pts
BSR Tigers	14	0	0	0	1132	601	65.32%	28	1st Semi	Southern Saints	13	10	88	RSMU Hawks	4	7	31
Mintaro/Manoora	12	0	2	0	1378	566	70.88%	24	2nd Semi	Mintaro/Manoora	14	13	97	BSR Tigers	10	4	64
RSMU Hawks	8	0	6	0	823	831	49.75%	16	Preliminary	BSR Tigers	13	7	85	Southern Saints	6	9	45
Southern Saints	7	0	7	0	857	720	54.34%	14	Grand	BSR Tigers	15	4	94	Mintaro/Manoora	9	10	94
BBH Rams	6	0	8	0	897	867	50.85%	12									
North Clare	4	0	10	0	748	985	43.16%	8									
South Clare	3	0	11	0	642	1209	35.06%	8									
Blyth/Snowtown	2	0	12	0	628	1326	32.13%	4									

== 2023 Ladder ==
North Eastern	Wins	Byes	Losses	Draws	For	Against	%	Pts	Final	Team	G	B	Pts	Team	G	B	Pts
BSR Tigers	14	0	0	0	1568	407	79.39%	28	1st Semi	Mintaro/Manoora	11	9	75	RSMU Hawks	5	7	37
Southern Saints	10	0	4	0	1147	642	64.11%	20	2nd Semi	BSR Tigers	8	14	62	Southern Saints	1	7	13
RSMU Hawks	9	0	5	0	910	606	60.02%	18	Preliminary	Southern Saints	9	10	64	Mintaro.Manoora	6	8	44
Mintaro/Manoora	9	0	5	0	940	701	57.28%	18	Grand	BSR Tigers	10	15	75	Southern Saints	4	7	31
North Clare	8	0	6	0	1158	935	55.32%	16									
BBH Rams	4	0	10	0	645	1132	36.29%	8									
South Clare	1	0	13	0	616	1542	28.54%	2									
Blyth/Snowtown	1	0	13	0	476	1495	24.15%	2									

== 2024 Ladder ==
North Eastern	Wins	Byes	Losses	Draws	For	Against	%	Pts	Final	Team	G	B	Pts	Team	G	B	Pts
Southern Saints	15	0	1	0	1563	609	71.96%	30	1st Semi	North Clare	11	17	83	RSMU Hawks	6	13	49
BSR Tigers	14	0	2	0	1748	452	79.45%	28	2nd Semi	Southern Saints	9	7	61	BSR Tigers	9	5	59
North Clare	10	0	6	0	1295	1007	56.25%	20	Preliminary	BSR Tigers	25	7	157	North Clare	6	6	42
RSMU Hawks	8	0	8	0	1141	1018	52.84%	16	Grand	BSR Tigers	10	5	65	Southern Saints	5	7	37
Mintaro/Manoora	6	0	10	0	939	1393	40.26%	12									
Blyth/Snowtown	6	0	10	0	904	1493	37.71%	12									
South Clare	4	0	12	0	904	1481	37.90%	8									
BBH Rams	1	0	15	0	765	1806	29.75%	2									

== 2025 Ladder ==
North Eastern	Wins	Byes	Losses	Draws	For	Against	%	Pts	Final	Team	G	B	Pts	Team	G	B	Pts
BSR Tigers	15	0	1	0	1651	508	76.47%	30	1st Semi	Southern Saints	10	17	77	RSMU Hawks	10	7	67
Mintaro/Manoora	12	0	4	0	1418	866	62.08%	24	2nd Semi	Mintaro/Manoora	10	9	69	BSR Tigers	10	3	63
Southern Saints	11	0	5	0	1147	904	55.92%	22	Preliminary	BSR Tigers	15	12	102	Southern Saints	5	4	34
RSMU Hawks	8	0	8	0	1067	834	56.12%	16	Grand	BSR Tigers	10	11	71	Mintaro/Manoora	8	11	59
Blyth/Snowtown	7	0	8	1	957	985	49.27%	15									
North Clare	8	0	8	1	970	1322	42.32%	15									
South Clare	2	0	14	0	776	1720	31.08&	4									
BBH Rams	1	0	15	0	543	1490	28.09&	2									

== See also ==
- Stanley Football Association
- Albert Fryar
