= Bronte Cockburn =

Australian basketball player

Personal information
- Born: 14 June 1941 (age 85) Fullarton, Adelaide, South Australia, Australia
- Position: Guard

Bronte Cockburn (born 14 June 1941) is a retired Australian women's basketball player.

== Biography ==
Cockburn played for the Australia women's national basketball team at the 1957 World Championship held in Brazil. She was only 16 years-old when she travelled with the team to compete in the Championship. Cockburn was captain of the South Australian junior school girls team which won the Australian trophy in 1954. She was named to the All-Australian schoolgirls team the same year. At 13 years-old, Cockburn was already playing top grade women's basketball in Adelaide.

Cockburn is the daughter of Jack Cockburn, who won the 1935 Magarey Medal for the South Australian National Football Leagues best and fairest player.
