= Joan Crawford (basketball) =

American basketball player (born 1937)

Medal record

Women's basketball

Representing the United States

FIBA World Championship
Gold medal – first place	1957 Brazil	Team competition

Pan American Games
Gold medal – first place	1959 Chicago	Team competition
Gold medal – first place	1963 São Paulo	Team competition

Joan Crawford (born August 22, 1937) is an American former basketball player and member of the Naismith Memorial Basketball Hall of Fame (enshrined in 1997), Women's Basketball Hall of Fame (enshrined in 1999), and Amateur Athletic Union Hall of Fame.

== Early life ==
Crawford was born to Monroe Crawford and Iris(Blan) Crawford. She was one of five children; she had two brothers and two sisters. Crawford became interested in basketball when she was only in fifth grade. She learned many of the fundamentals of the game from her brother Robert.

She learned enough about the game and was skilled enough to be invited onto the senior team in high school while only a freshman in Van Buren, AR. Crawford and the Van Buren Pointerettes won a state championship in her sophomore, junior and senior season. She was the team captain for the Pointerettes and was selected All-State and All-District all 3 years. She was inducted into the VBHS Hall of Honor in 2000.

== College and AAU ==
Crawford attended Clarendon Junior College on a basketball scholarship. She graduated two years later, after helping Clarendon advance to the quarterfinals of the AAU national tournament in 1957. Her performance earned her AAU All-America honors.

Crawford was offered a scholarship to Wayland Baptist University, one of the basketball powerhouses of the era, but chose to go to Nashville Business College, where Nera White, one of the outstanding players of the era, played. Crawford originally was enrolled in the school's business program, but dropped that and worked as a supervisor in the mail room. As an AAU team, the players did not have to be enrolled as students.

Over the next twelve seasons, the Nashville team would win the National AAU Championship ten times, and Crawford was named to the All-America team in every year. In 1962, the Nashville team was especially dominant, winning every game in the post-season tournament by at least 14 points, and winning the championship game over Wayland 63–35. She would go on to win the MVP of the 1963 and 1964 AAU National Tournaments.

Crawford played with Nera White for on the Nashville team for eleven years. Crawford noted, "We knew almost what each other was going to do. We didn't have to look or aim. A lot of times, in a fast break, I'd just throw it down to Nera, she'd just throw it down to me."

== USA Basketball ==
With the US National team, Crawford won the World Championship in 1957, and the 1959 and 1963 Pan American Games. The World Championship game was against the USSR, the first time the USA had faced the USSR in a major competition. The USA came into the final with a single loss to Czechoslovakia, while the USSR was undefeated. The USA team was down by three points at the half, but came back in the second half to win the championship 51–48. Crawford scored a game high 27 points in the championship game against Brazil.
