= Nera White =

American basketball player (1935–2016)

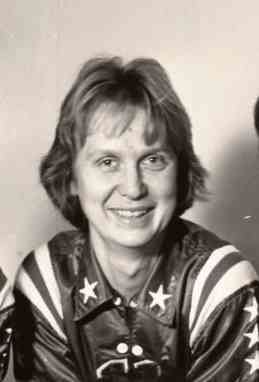
- White in 1965

Personal information
- Born: November 15, 1935 Macon County, Tennessee, U.S.
- Died: April 13, 2016 (aged 80) Gallatin, Tennessee, U.S.
- Listed height: 6 ft 1 in (185 cm)
- Basketball Hall of Fame
- Women's Basketball Hall of Fame
Medals
Women's basketball
Representing the United States
Gold medal – first place	1957 Brazil	Team competition

Nera D. White (November 15, 1935 – April 13, 2016) was an American basketball player. White played in the AAU national tournaments for the Nashville Business College team while completing her education at George Peabody College for Teachers, which did not field a team. Later, she led the United States national women's basketball team to their victory in the 1957 FIBA World Championship. Throughout her career, she was awarded numerous accolades, including her induction to the Naismith Memorial Basketball Hall of Fame and the Women's Basketball Hall of Fame. Playing at a time when there were no major professional women's basketball leagues in the U.S., White distinguished herself, receiving many accolades as one of the greatest female players in history. Talented in multiple sports, she also was distinguished as an All-World player by the Amateur Softball Association.

== Early life and education ==
White was born in Macon County, Tennessee, to Horace White, a teacher, coach and farmer, and his wife, the former Lois Birdean. White attended the George Peabody College for Teachers (now part of Vanderbilt University), along with Sue Gunter and Doris Rogers, both of whom went on to play for the United States women's national basketball team. She completed all of the undergraduate requirements for a degree in education except for the student teaching requirement, which she was unable to complete due to shyness. George Peabody did not have a women's basketball team, so she played for the Amateur Athletic Union (AAU) team in Nashville sponsored by Nashville Business College.

== Basketball career ==
White was named AAU All-American for 15 years in a row from 1955 to 1969, and she led the Nashville Business College team to ten AAU national championships during that period. White was named the MVP of the AAU National Tournament nine times. While she played for Nashville Business college, the team once had a stretch of 92 games where they won 91. White was "widely acknowledged as the greatest woman ever to play the game". In 1966, Harley Redin (head coach of the Wayland Baptist Flying Queens, the dominant team of the 1950s) called her the "greatest woman basketball player in history".

I've coached two Olympic teams and I've seen the best players in the world. Nera White is the best of them all.

— Sue Gunter

Hall of Fame player and coach Sue Gunter said that White was the best of the best.

In addition to her basketball prowess, White was also an accomplished softball player. She was honored as All-World in 1959 and 1965 for the ASA Fast Pitch softball team. She played centerfield, shortstop and pitcher. White was the first woman to ever circle the bases in ten seconds.

=== US national team ===
In 1957 White led the US national team to winning the World Championship. The World Championship game was against the USSR, the first time the USA had faced the USSR in a major competition. The USA came into the final with a single loss to Czechoslovakia, while the USSR was undefeated. The USA team was down by three points at the half, but came back in the second half to win the championship 51–48. White was the leading scorer on the USA team, averaging 14.1 points per game. White was named the MVP of the tournament, and voted the Best Woman Player in the World. She was referred to as the "best female basketball player in the world that year".

== Legacy ==
White was enshrined in the Naismith Memorial Basketball Hall of Fame in 1992 and in the Women's Basketball Hall of Fame in 1999. White is one of only two players inducted into the Naismith Hall of Fame based on AAU accomplishments, the other being Joan Crawford.

At the turn of the century, Sports Illustrated for Women identified the century's greatest sportswomen. Nera White was named 51st on the list of all sports, and is the sixth highest basketball player on the list, behind Cheryl Miller, Teresa Edwards, Ann Meyers, Nancy Lieberman and Anne Donovan.

The high school gym in her hometown, Lafayette, Tennessee, is named after White.

A local highway (State Route 10 North) has been renamed Nera White Highway.

== Death ==
White died on April 13, 2016, at a hospital in Gallatin, Tennessee, from complications of pneumonia, at the age of 80.
