= 1957 FIBA World Championship for Women =

Basketball championship

2nd FIBA World Championship for Women

Tournament details
- Host country: Brazil
- Dates: 13–26 October
- Teams: 12
- Venue: 1 (in 1 host city)

Final positions
- Champions: United States (2nd title)

Tournament statistics
- Top scorer: (Paraguay) Nuñez 23.4
- PPG (Team): Czechoslovakia 67.7

The 1957 FIBA World Championship for Women (Portuguese:Campeonato Mundial Feminino da Fiba de 1957) was the second FIBA World Championship for Women basketball championship held by FIBA. It was held in Brazil between 13 October and 26 October 1957. Twelve national teams entered the event under the auspices of FIBA, the sport's governing body. The city of Rio de Janeiro hosted the tournament. The United States won its second title after finishing in first place in the second round.

== Format ==
- In the preliminary round teams were split into three round-robin groups, two of four teams and one of three teams. The top two teams from each group advanced to the final round. Hosts Brazil advanced to the final round directly.
- The teams that did not reach the final round, played in the classification round, which consisted of a round-robin group of five teams to define eighth through twelfth places in the final standings.
- In the final, a seven-team round-robin group was formed to compete for the championship and second through seventh places in the final standings.

== Preliminary round ==
Qualified for the final round

Times given below are in Brasília time (UTC−3).

=== Group A ===
Team	Pld	W	L	PF	PA	PD	Pts
Czechoslovakia	3	3	0	215	120	+95	6
United States	3	2	1	189	129	+60	5
Argentina	3	1	2	138	183	−45	4
Peru	3	0	3	108	218	−110	3

13 October
20:00

Boxscore

United States	75–37	Peru
Scoring by half: 41–12, 34–25
Pts: Sipes 19		Pts: Barrenechea 11

Rio de Janeiro

13 October
21:30

Boxscore

Czechoslovakia	76–42	Argentina
Scoring by half: 41–15, 35–27
Pts: Dubska 24		Pts: Bonetti 11

Rio de Janeiro

14 October
20:00

Boxscore

Czechoslovakia	86–28	Peru
Scoring by half: 40–15, 46–13
Pts: Dubska 15		Pts: Fulgosi 7

Rio de Janeiro

14 October
21:30

Boxscore

United States	64–39	Argentina
Scoring by half: 35–15, 29–24
Pts: White 22		Pts: Bonetti 11

Rio de Janeiro

15 October
20:00

Boxscore

Argentina	57–43	Peru
Scoring by half: 29–21, 28–22
Pts: Pietrapina 18		Pts: Cantina 13

Rio de Janeiro

15 October
21:30

Boxscore

United States	50–53	Czechoslovakia
Scoring by half: 20–23, 30–30
Pts: Crawford 14		Pts: Mubalokova 16

Rio de Janeiro

=== Group B ===
Team	Pld	W	L	PF	PA	PD	Pts
Soviet Union	2	2	0	140	83	+57	4
Paraguay	2	1	1	116	101	+15	3
Australia	2	0	2	63	135	−72	2

13 October
21:30

Boxscore

Soviet Union	70–32	Australia
Scoring by half: 29–13, 41–19
Pts: Kostikova 24		Pts: Cockburn 11

Rio de Janeiro

14 October
22:00

Boxscore

Soviet Union	70–51	Paraguay
Scoring by half: 35–33, 35–18
Pts: Kostikova 20		Pts: Nuñez 22

Rio de Janeiro

15 October
19:00

Boxscore

Paraguay	65–31	Australia
Scoring by half: 38–15, 27–16
Pts: Nuñez 32		Pts: Hill 9

Rio de Janeiro

=== Group C ===
Team	Pld	W	L	PF	PA	PD	Pts
Hungary	3	3	0	244	153	+91	6
Chile	3	2	1	180	161	+19	5
Mexico	3	1	2	154	190	−36	4
Cuba	3	0	3	130	204	−74	3

13 October

Boxscore

Chile	53–65	Hungary
Scoring by half: 27–28, 26–37
Pts: Velasquez 27		Pts: Koren, Matay 16

Rio de Janeiro

13 October
20:00

Boxscore

Cuba	39–49	Mexico
Scoring by half: 21–30, 18–19
Pts: Thaureaux 12		Pts: Concepsión 10

Rio de Janeiro

14 October
19:00

Boxscore

Chile	62–51	Mexico
Scoring by half: 39–22, 23–29
Pts: Pauchard 27		Pts: Concepsión 22

Rio de Janeiro

14 October
20:30

Boxscore

Hungary	90–46	Cuba
Scoring by half: 42–24, 48–22
Pts: Matay 22		Pts: Pauchard 16

Rio de Janeiro

15 October
20:30

Boxscore

Chile	65–45	Cuba
Scoring by half: 33–12, 32–33
Pts: Pauchard 26		Pts: Thaureaux 18

Rio de Janeiro

15 October
22:00

Boxscore

Mexico	54–89	Hungary
Scoring by half: 20–45, 34–44
Pts: Concepsión 22		Pts: Schneider 18

Rio de Janeiro

== Classification round ==
Team	Pld	W	L	PF	PA	PD	Pts
Mexico	4	4	0	197	173	+24	8
Argentina	4	3	1	228	188	+40	7
Australia	4	2	2	170	171	−1	6
Peru	4	1	3	167	180	−13	5
Cuba	4	0	4	170	220	−50	4

18 October
20:00

Boxscore

Cuba	50–58	Mexico
Scoring by half: 23–25, 27–33
Pts: Thaureaux 9		Pts: Sánchez 14

Rio de Janeiro

18 October
21:30

Boxscore

Australia	44–52	Argentina
Scoring by half: 24–24, 20–28
Pts: Cockburn 9		Pts: Bonetti 21

Rio de Janeiro

20 October
20:00

Boxscore

Mexico	45–38	Australia
Scoring by half: 23–21, 22–17
Pts: Rivera 9		Pts: Cockburn 11

Rio de Janeiro

20 October
21:30

Boxscore

Peru	49–66	Argentina
Scoring by half: 16–31, 33–35
Pts: Flechele 21		Pts: Lorenzo 17

Rio de Janeiro

21 October
20:00

Boxscore

Cuba	43–50	Australia
Scoring by half: 26–26, 17–24
Pts: Thaureaux 13		Pts: Cockburn, Macquire 13

Rio de Janeiro

21 October
21:30

Boxscore

Mexico	45–36	Peru
Scoring by half: 17–18, 28–19
Pts: Sánchez 9		Pts: Flechele 11

Rio de Janeiro

22 October
20:00

Boxscore

Argentina	62–46	Cuba
Scoring by half: 25–27, 37–19
Pts: Lorenzo, Pietrapina 12		Pts: Thaureaux 14

Rio de Janeiro

22 October
21:30

Boxscore

Australia	38–31	Peru
Scoring by half: 16–20, 22–11
Pts: Macquire 13		Pts: Barrenechea 14

Rio de Janeiro

23 October
20:00

Boxscore

Mexico	49–48	Argentina
Scoring by half: 23–24, 26–24
Pts: García 19		Pts: Lorenzo 17

Rio de Janeiro

23 October
21:30

Boxscore

Cuba	31–50	Peru
Scoring by half: 23–23, 8–27
Pts: Thaureaux, Buergo 6		Pts: Barrenechea 15

Rio de Janeiro

== Final round ==
Team	Pld	W	L	PF	PA	PD	Pts
United States	6	6	0	366	280	+86	12
Soviet Union	6	5	1	365	292	+73	11
Czechoslovakia	6	4	2	394	319	+75	10
Brazil	6	3	3	324	365	−41	9
Hungary	6	2	4	297	317	−20	8
Paraguay	6	1	5	274	338	−64	7
Chile	6	0	6	287	396	−109	6

17 October
20:00

Boxscore

Chile	46–76	Czechoslovakia
Scoring by half: 19–30, 27–46
Pts: Pauchard 20		Pts: Mubalokova 22

Rio de Janeiro

17 October
21:30

Boxscore

Brazil	48–46	Paraguay
Scoring by half: 25–27, 23–19
Pts: Ramos 11		Pts: Nuñez 22

Rio de Janeiro

18 October
20:00

Boxscore

Soviet Union	67–38	Chile
Scoring by half: 36–19, 31–19
Pts: Kostikova 22		Pts: Pauchard 15

Rio de Janeiro

18 October
21:30

Boxscore

United States	51–46	Hungary
Scoring by half: 27–29, 24–17
Pts: Sipes 15		Pts: Parti 16

Rio de Janeiro

19 October
20:00

Boxscore

Czechoslovakia	68–47	Paraguay
Scoring by half: 30–22, 38–25
Pts: Mazlova-Adamirova 25		Pts: Nuñez 18

Rio de Janeiro

19 October
21:30

Boxscore

Brazil	44–67	United States
Scoring by half: 21–33, 23–34
Pts: Bento 9		Pts: White 28

Rio de Janeiro

20 October
19:00

Boxscore

Soviet Union	69–49	Paraguay
Scoring by half: 36–22, 33–27
Pts: Maksimelenova 15		Pts: Nuñez 24

Rio de Janeiro

20 October
20:00

Boxscore

Czechoslovakia	57–61	Soviet Union
Scoring by half: 28–30, 29–31
Pts: Mazlova-Adamirova 14		Pts: Maksimelenova 19

Rio de Janeiro

20 October
20:30

Boxscore

Brazil	66–64	Chile
Scoring by half: 36–30, 30–34
Pts: Bento 26		Pts: Velasquez 29

Rio de Janeiro

20 October
22:00

Boxscore

Hungary	34–55	Czechoslovakia
Scoring by half: 13–25, 21–30
Pts: Matay 8		Pts: Mazlova-Adamirova 18

Rio de Janeiro

21 October
20:00

Boxscore

Paraguay	46–43	Chile
Scoring by half: 22–23, 24–20
Pts: Nuñez 21		Pts: Velasquez 17

Rio de Janeiro

21 October
21:30

Boxscore

Hungary	53–64	Soviet Union
Scoring by half: 26–32, 27–32
Pts: Schneider 25		Pts: Jarosevskaya 14

Rio de Janeiro

22 October
20:00

Boxscore

United States	76–47	Chile
Scoring by half: 40–17, 36–30
Pts: White 18		Pts: Velasquez 17

Rio de Janeiro

22 October
21:30

Boxscore

Brazil	44–56	Soviet Union
Scoring by half: 24–20, 20–36
Pts: Cardozo 10		Pts: Maksimelenova 19

Rio de Janeiro

23 October
20:00

Boxscore

Paraguay	46–50	Hungary
Scoring by half: 25–28, 21–22
Pts: Nuñez 27		Pts: Parti 17

Rio de Janeiro

23 October
21:30

Boxscore

United States	61–55	Czechoslovakia
Scoring by half: 30–24, 31–31
Pts: Crawford 15		Pts: Mubalokova 21

Rio de Janeiro

24 October
21:30

Boxscore

Brazil	52–49	Hungary
Scoring by half: 25–24, 27–25
Pts: Campos 21		Pts: Schneider 10

Rio de Janeiro

25 October
20:00

Boxscore

Paraguay	40–60	United States
Scoring by half: 8–36, 23–24
Pts: Nuñez 21		Pts: Sipes 27

Rio de Janeiro

25 October
21:30

Boxscore

Chile	49–65	Hungary
Scoring by half: 30–36, 19–29
Pts: Silva 15		Pts: Schneider 23

Rio de Janeiro

26 October
20:00

Boxscore

United States	51–48	Soviet Union
Scoring by half: 24–27, 27–21
Pts: Sipes 18		Pts: Jarosevskaya 15

Rio de Janeiro

26 October
21:30

Boxscore

Brazil	70–83	Czechoslovakia
Scoring by half: 33–28, 37–55
Pts: Bento 27		Pts: Mazlova-Adamirova 26

Rio de Janeiro

== Final standings ==
Rank	Team	Record
1st place, gold medalist(s)	United States	8–1
2nd place, silver medalist(s)	Soviet Union	7–1
3rd place, bronze medalist(s)	Czechoslovakia	7–2
4	Brazil	3–3
5	Hungary	5–4
6	Paraguay	2–6
7	Chile	2–7
8	Mexico	5–2
9	Argentina	4–3
10	Australia	2–4
10	Peru	1–6
10	Italy	0–7
