= Albert Fryar =

South Australian philatelist and sportsman (1875–1944)

Albert Edmund Fryar
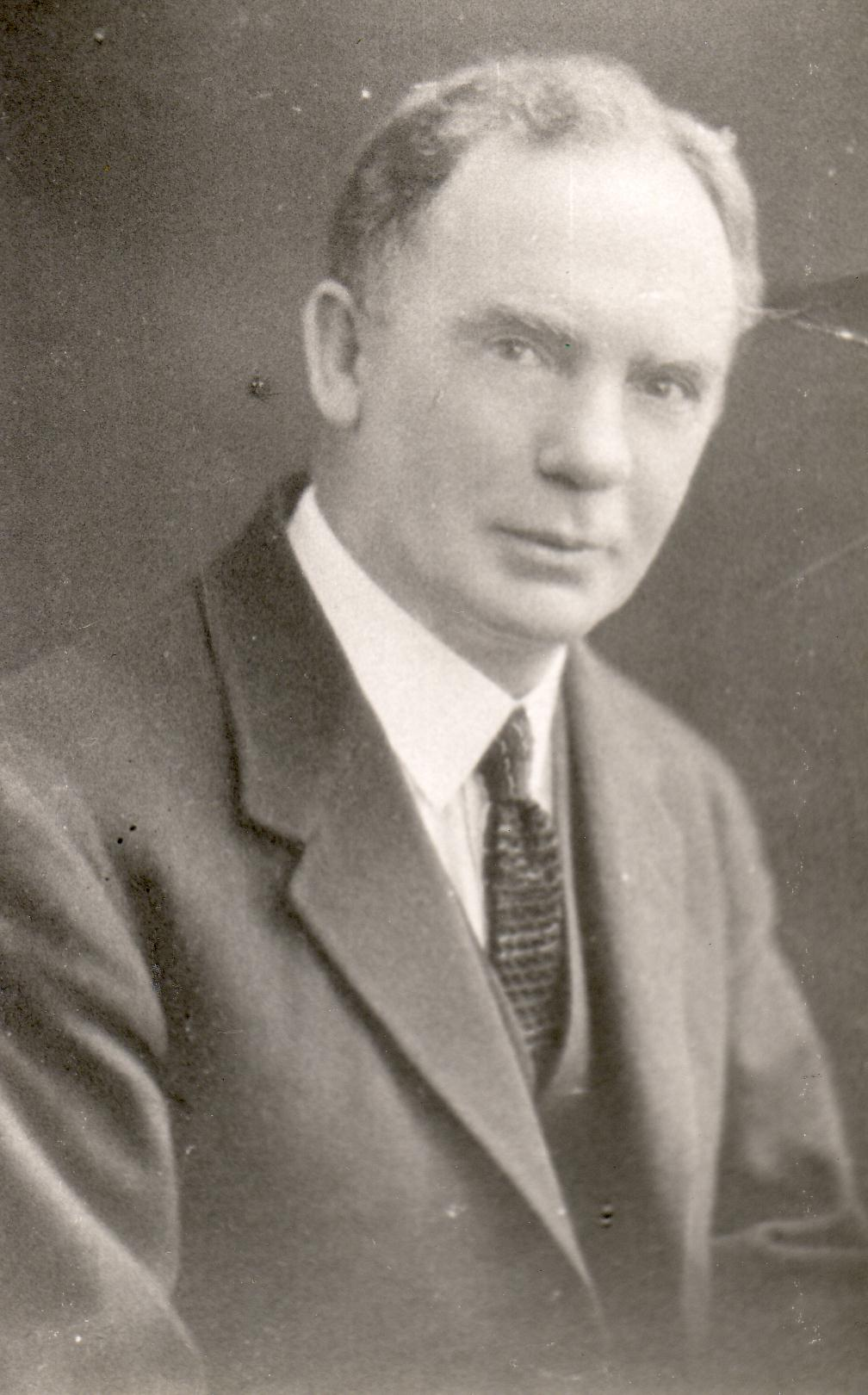
- Born: 2 December 1875; Stanley Flat, South Australia
- Died: 23 July 1944 (aged 68); Rose Park, South Australia
- Resting place: Clare General Cemetery, Clare, South Australia
- Occupation: Land broker
- Employer: Elders Smith & Co
- Spouse: Wanda Elsa née Von Sanden
- Children: Colin Thomas Fryar (1917–1975), Donald "Rocky" Fryar (1919–2011), Bruce Edmund "Bill" Fryar (1922–1997)
- Parent(s): Joseph Fryar (1847–1928) and Isabella née Carey (1839–1913)

Albert Edmund Fryar (2 December 1875 – 23 July 1944) was a South Australian philatelist and sportsman.

== Family and education ==
Fryar was born on 2 December 1875 and raised in Stanley Flat, South Australia a small rural town about 6 km north of Clare, to Irish immigrant parents Joseph Fryar (1847–1928) and Isabella née Carey (1839–1913). He attended the Stanley Flat public school, and following private tuition, graduated from the University of Adelaide in September 1891. After completing school, Fryar was employed by Mr Magnus Badger Solicitor in Clare, where he worked for 18 years as a clerk. He then moved to North Adelaide to work for Elders Smith & Co as a land broker and Justice of the Peace. He was eventually promoted to lands department manager of the company.

On 3 May 1916, he married Wanda Elsa Von Sanden, daughter of Bernhard Von Sanden (1850–1924) and Alice Emily née Spencer (1860–1930) at North Adelaide. They lived at Rose Park in South Australia. Together they had three sons; Colin Thomas Fryar, Donald (Rocky) Fryar and Bruce Edmund (Bill) Fryar.

Fryar died at his residence on 23 July 1944 following a long illness and was buried at the Clare General Cemetery.

== Philately ==
Fryar began collecting stamps as a boy. His specific interest was South Australian stamps. At the International Philatelic Exhibition held in Melbourne in November 1928, Fryar secured the championship of Australia trophy and gold medal for his collection of South Australian stamps. His collection comprised 15 albums and contained practically a complete set since the first issue of postage stamps in 1855, the first year postage stamps were issued in South Australia. An outstanding feature of his collection was the "fourpenny blue error", the only one in Australia.

Fryar also owned a number of other rare stamps including a Western Australian stamp in which—through faulty printing—the swan appeared upside down. It was reported that there were only two copies; one owned by Fryar and the other by King George V. Another rarity in his collection was a South Australian shilling violet stamp. This was a stamp that was prepared in England about 1855, but on arrival in South Australia were mislaid, and did not get into circulation. At the time, it was valued around £50.

At the fifth Australian Philateic Exhibition held in Sydney in April 1942, Fryar's collection took four awards, including the exhibition championship trophy (gold medal). Two of Fryar's sons, Colin and Rocky also won awards at the same exhibition.

Fryar's stamp collection also helped solve a controversy about the correct name of a small town in South Australia. For many years during the 1930s and 1940s, it was unclear whether the correct title of the name of the town of Sevenhill was Sevenhill, or Sevenhill(s). Fryar provided conclusive evidence (cuttings from envelopes and postal cancellations) that the correct title was indeed Sevenhill.

== Sports ==
Fryar was a prominent footballer, cricketer, and cyclist. He was regarded as the most accomplished, all-round sportsman and athlete to have been produced from the Clare region. In May 1899, he broke the South Australian road record for 100 miles unpaced cycling by 44 minutes, with a time of 6 hours and 12 minutes. This record remained unbroken for 28 years. Although slow compared to subsequent times, the record-breaking ride was over some of the hilliest country in the state and when roads were in a poor condition.

As a cricketer, Fryar was described as a daring, hard-hitting batsman who topped the century on several occasions. He also regularly opened the bowling and averaged about 50 wickets per season. Leaving Clare well after his prime, Fryar played for the Wallaby Cricket Club in the Adelaide and Suburban Cricket Association for over 30 years. For many years he organised cricket teams from Adelaide to play in Clare, with one team including his three sons. As a sports administrator, Fryar was treasurer of the South Australian Athletic League for over 21 years and was president of the Adelaide and Suburban Cricket Association and the vice president of the South Australian Junior Cricket Union. For his services to cricket as both a player and administrator, Fryar was awarded Life Membership to the Adelaide and Suburban Cricket Association in 1937.

As a footballer, Fryar was regarded as the best goal-sneak outside of Adelaide. He played for the Clare club for many years and for a long time he was captain. In a game against Sevenhill, Fryar kicked nine of Clare's ten goals. In later years, Fryar was a frequent visitor back to his hometown of Clare where he presented the "A. E. Fryar medal", an annual award for the fairest and most brilliant footballer in the Stanley Association.
