= John L. Head =

American basketball coach (1915–1980)

Biographical details
- Born: July 22, 1915
- Died: May 4, 1980 (aged 64)

Coaching career (HC unless noted)
- 1948–1969: Nashville Business College

Head coaching record
- Overall: 689–94

Accomplishments and honors

Championships
- 1950 AAU National Championship; 1958 AAU National Championship; 1960 AAU National Championship; 1962 AAU National Championship; 1963 AAU National Championship; 1964 AAU National Championship; 1965 AAU National Championship; 1966 AAU National Championship; 1967 AAU National Championship; 1968 AAU National Championship; 1969 AAU National Championship; 1953 World Championship; 1957 World Championship; 1963 Pan American Games Championship
- Women's Basketball Hall of Fame
Medal record
Head coach for women's basketball
United States
Pan American Games
Gold medal – first place	1963 São Paulo	Team
FIBA World Championship for Women
Gold medal – first place	1953 Santiago	Team
Gold medal – first place	1957 Rio de Janeiro	Team

John L. Head (July 22, 1915 – May 8, 1980) was an American basketball coach. He was the head coach of the Nashville Business College women's basketball team from 1948 to 1969. Over the course of 21 seasons, his teams won the national championship eleven times and finished in second place four times. Head was inducted in the inaugural class at the Women's Basketball Hall of Fame in 1999.

== Early years ==
Head played basketball and baseball at Coopertown High School in Coopertown, Tennessee, where he graduated in 1934. He played basketball and football in college, attending both Lambuth College and Union University in Jackson, Tennessee. His first introduction to coaching was in 1936, when he was coached an intramural sorority team. After college he coached high school teams for twelve years, coaching girls and boys basketball as well as football and baseball.

== Nashville Business College ==
In 1948 he accepted a position as head coach of the Nashville Business College (NBC) team. Although the team was associated with a school, it was an AAU team; players did not have to be enrolled at the school to play for the team. NBC was a well-respected team, with fourth-place finishes in 1945 and 1948, but had not won a national championship. In Head's first year, the team would finish in second place to another Nashville team, the Goldblumes, but would go on to defeat the Goldblumes in 1950, for their first national championship.

The NBC team also finished second in 1956. From 1958 to 1961, the NBC team finished first or second, with Wayland Baptist in the other position. The NBC first-place finishes were 1958 and 1960. Then, in 1962, NBC reeled off eight consecutive national championships. The last of these championships was in 1969, at which time the sponsor of the team withdrew the sponsorship, and Head retired.

Head's approach to basketball was described by Sue Gunter as a "quiet disciplinarian". The teams' repertoire of plays was quite limited, consisted only of "two defenses, two offenses and two breaks". However, as Gunter explained, "Everybody that we played knew exactly what we were going to do when we came into the gym...But they couldn't beat it, because of the execution." Head stressed practice, but not just practice. He emphasized that you had to practice the right things. One of his All-American players, Doris Rogers, remembers his lesson,"If you keep practicing the same thing wrong you will never get any better. I have never forgotten that."

== USA basketball ==
Head was asked to be the head coach of the USA basketball team for the very first World Championships for women, held in Santiago, Chile in 1953. The team was composed largely of NBC players, along with players from two other schools. The USA would lose one game to Brazil, but ended up with a 5–1 record and the gold medal to take the first World Championship title.

Head was asked to continue as head coach for the Second World Championships held in Rio de Janeiro, Brazil in 1957. While this team had several NBC players, there were representatives from five different organizations. The team lost an early match against Czechoslovakia, trailed Hungary at the half, but held on to win, then won a rematch with Czechoslovakia. The title game was against the unbeaten USSR, the first time the two squads had met in a major competition. The USA team was behind by three points at the half, but came from behind to win 51–48 and win the 1957 World Championship.

Head also served as the head coach of the USA basketball team at the 1963 Pan American Games, held in Sao Paulo, Brazil. The USA team won several games easily, but with 30,000 fans cheering on the home squad, Chile beat the USA team 85–48 in their second match-up. This ended a 21-game winning streak by the USA team. They would also meet Brazil in the title game, but the result would be quite different. The USA team held the Brazilians scoreless for eleven minutes, and cruised to an easy 59–43 win to take the gold medal and the 1963 Pan American Championship.

== Awards and honors ==
Head was inducted into the Women's Basketball Hall of Fame as a coach as part of the first class of Inductees in 1999.
